= 2012–13 Dallas Mavericks season =

NBA professional basketball team season

- Head coach: Rick Carlisle
- President: Donnie Nelson
- General manager: Donnie Nelson
- Owner: Mark Cuban
- Arena: American Airlines Center

Results
- Record: 41–41 (.500)
- Place: Division: 4th (Southwest); Conference: 10th (Western)
- Playoff finish: Did not qualify
- Stats at Basketball Reference

Local media
- Television: FS Southwest; KTXA
- Radio: KESN

The 2012–13 Dallas Mavericks season was the 33rd season of the franchise in the National Basketball Association (NBA). This for first time since 2003–04 season Jason Terry was not on the opening day roster and for first time since 2006-07 season Jason Kidd was not on the opening day roster. The Mavericks failed to qualify for the playoffs for the first time since 2000.

== Key dates ==
- June 28: The 2012 NBA draft took place at the Prudential Center in Newark, New Jersey.
- July 1: Free agency starts and players are allowed to sign contracts with new or their old teams.
- July 26: Schedule announced for new season.

== Draft picks ==
Round	Pick	Player	Position	Nationality	College
1	17	Tyler Zeller (traded to Cleveland)	C	United States	North Carolina
2	55	Darius Johnson-Odom (traded to the LA Lakers)	SG	United States	Marquette

On draft night, the Mavericks sent Tyler Zeller and Kelenna Azubuike to Cleveland for their 24th, 33rd and 34th picks, Jared Cunningham, Bernard James and Jae Crowder. Darius Johnson-Odom was sent to Los Angeles for cash considerations.

== Offseason ==
The Mavericks had several players coming into the free agency. Brandan Wright's option for another year was exercised on June 23. On July 1, 2012, the Mavs exercised the option on Vince Carter to sign him for the season.

Their main target was signing Deron Williams, who was under contract with Brooklyn until last year. They met with Williams on July 2, but he signed a five-year extension later with Brooklyn.

Jason Terry signed a three-year deal worth $15 million with Boston, while Jason Kidd agreed to a deal with the New York Knicks.

On July 11, Chris Kaman signed a one-year deal with the Mavs. It was also announced that they would amnesty Brendan Haywood. Ian Mahinmi was sent to Indiana in a sign and trade for Darren Collison and Dahntay Jones.

The Mavericks won the bidding process for Elton Brand on July 13 with $2.1 million.

The Mavs signed O. J. Mayo on July 16.

The Mavs signed their draft picks Jae Crowder on July 20, and Jared Cunningham a day later.

On July 24, Delonte West agreed to re-sign with the Mavericks.

Bernard James, their third draft pick, was signed to a contract on July 25.

Eddy Curry was claimed off waivers on October 25, 2012.

== Season recap ==
=== Preseason ===
The Mavericks played in the 2012 NBA Europe Live Tour. On October 6 they faced German club Alba Berlin and three days later they played against FC Barcelona. They wrapped up the European tour with a record of 1–1. Against the Houston Rockets the Mavs won, thanks to a 20–0 run at the beginning of the third quarter, 123–104. They lost against the Phoenix Suns and the record fell to 2–2. The Mavs ended their preseason with a record of 4–4 after a win over the Charlotte Bobcats.

=== Regular season ===
The Mavs started their regular season at the Los Angeles Lakers and their new formed team. They took the lead in the second quarter and never looked back, at the end it was a 99–91 victory and the season started off the right foot. Despite leading by eight at the break, the Mavericks fell in their first back-to-back this season to the Jazz 94–113. In their home opener against the Charlotte Bobcats, the Mavericks blew them out by 27 with O. J. Mayo scoring 30 and the team going 16 of 25 from behind the arc. Mayo added another 30+ game and Darren Collison got his second straight double-double in a blowout win against Portland. Without Elton Brand, who was with his wife for the birth of his child, the Mavs won against the Toronto Raptors 109–104 with Chris Kaman starting for the first time and scoring 22, the same point amount that Mayo had. The Mavs fell, with Brand and Beaubois, to the New York Knicks who improved to a league-best 4–0 record. On the next night, the Mavs lost to Charlotte who defeated the Mavericks for the first time in 17 tries. The Mavs lost their first game at home and third straight game to the hands of the Minnesota Timberwolves. Against the winless Washington Wizards the Mavs took care of business and won by six, while putting up 40 points in the second quarter. Their next back-to-back started at the Indiana Pacers, who played without Danny Granger, but got the win in blowout fashion by 20. On the second night they took on the Cleveland Cavaliers and squeezed out a win by eight, 103–95. The Golden State Warriors came to town and defeated the Mavs after Overtime 105–101. Two days later, Jason Kidd and Tyson Chandler returned to Dallas with the New York Knicks. In a high scoring affair the Mavs closed it out and won by three, 114–111. The Lakers were next up to the Mavs on their home floor and got out there with a big win by 27. After a two-point loss against the Philadelphia 76ers the Mavs fell, for the first time this season, under .500. Without Collison the Mavericks failed on the second night of a back-to-back by losing to the Chicago Bulls. In the first game of Derek Fisher, which he started, the Mavs defeated the Detroit Pistons comfortably 92–77. When facing the Los Angeles Clippers, the Mavs got blown out by 22, the same number of turnovers they had for the game. On the next night, they won at the Phoenix Suns by three, after O. J. Mayo put them ahead late in the game. The Mavericks took on the Houston Rockets and it was a duel between James Harden and Mayo, who scored 39 and 40 points respectively. Mayo had the better on his side as the Mavs won by seven. Next up, the Mavs took care of the Sacramento Kings and blew them out 119–96. In the first game against ex-Maverick Jason Terry and his Boston Celtics the Mavs fell after double overtime. The Mavs moved to Canada to take on Toronto and got blown out badly. It also ended the streak of at least one three pointer in a game after 1,108 games, last time it happened was in 1999. On the next night they faced Minnesota and lost by eight after overtime, which moved their overtime record to 0–3. After being back on their home floor, the Mavs won against the 76ers, and split the season series against them. Without Fisher, Brand and Brandan Wright the Mavs lost by 15 to the Miami Heat. With Wright back, the Mavs fell to the Memphis Grizzlies by ten. Dirk Nowitzki returned against the San Antonio Spurs, but the Mavs still lost by 38. The game at the Oklahoma City Thunder went into overtime, and the Mavs again fell short, this time by six. In Nowitzki's home debut, the Mavericks lost to the Denver Nuggets by 21. In the last game in 2012, Vince Carter made his starting debut for the season, but could not prevent the Mavs from losing to the Spurs by 25. On New Year's Day the Mavs took on Washington and were able to win by nine, after being down by as much as 14 in the second quarter. In yet another overtime game, the Mavs fell to Miami by 10, which leads the Mavericks still winless in overtime games this season (0–6). Nowitzki made his first start in a game against the New Orleans Hornets, which marked the 15th different starting lineup this year for the Mavs. The Hornets meanwhile got out with a win in Overtime with Eric Gordon scoring eight points in the extra period, which marked the tenth consecutive loss for the Mavs in overtime. Back on the road, the Mavs lost to the Utah Jazz, which marked their 12th loss in the last 14 games. At LA, against the Clippers the Mavs failed to convert a 5-point lead going into the fourth quarter, to lose by six. Against the Kings, in the second night of a back-to-back, the Mavs won after overtime by five. The Mavs blew Memphis out back on their homecourt, by 21. Against Minnesota, who were without Kevin Love and coach Rick Adelman, the Mavs were able ton their third straight game, this time by 15. In another must-win game against Houston, the Mavs escaped with a five-point victory after being up by 11 in the fourth quarter. In yet another Overtime game against Oklahoma City, Kevin Durant scored 52 points (21 from the line) to help the Thunder win it. Mayo made a three to tie the game in regulation but Carter missed a chance to send it to double-overtime. At Orlando the Mavs had several double-digit leads before winning it by five in the end. Against the Sours, their third meeting, it looked like another 25+ loss, but the Mavs were able to cut it down late, to lose by six. Bernard James made his first career-start against Phoenix, with both Brand and Kaman coming off the bench. The Mavs were able to win comfortably by 15, in a game where Nowitzki moved past Allen Iverson in the all-time scoring list, now placed at 18th. In a rematch of Game 4 of the 2011 playoffs between Dallas and Portland, the Trail Blazers erased a 21-point deficit and won at the buzzer after a LaMarcus Aldridge shot. Without Nowitzki, against Golden State the Mavs lost another nailbiter, by three at the end. The Mavs were able to turn a fourth quarter in their favour and defeating the Suns for the third time this season. The Mavs lost their league-"best" ninth game by 20+ points against Oklahoma. Back home, the Mavs faced a must-win five-game homestand. They rallied back from 10+ points and won the game against Portland by 6 by just allowing 38 points in the second half after giving up 61 before the break. The Mavericks avoided being swept by Golden State in the season series by beating them by 25 points. Against the Atlanta Hawks the Mavs lost by four, which shrunk their playoff hopes to a minimum. The last game before the all-star break was successful against Sacramento. Carter scored 17 points in the third quarter, surpassing Larry Bird on the all-time scoring leader list and made his 1,600 three pointer of his career. The Mavs started the post all-star season with a win against Orlando. At New Orleans, the Mavericks needed two late threes by Mike James and Carter to escape with a four-point victory. On a marquee matchup with playoff intense, the Mavs lost to the LA Lakers by four. On a back-2-back, the Mavs lost at home to Milwaukee and at Memphis, shrinking their playoff hopes to a minimum. After three straight losses the Mavericks won at Brooklyn by 8, after being up by 20 in the fourth quarter. At Houston, the Mavericks got blown out badly, 103–136. Three days later, in the second straight game against Houston, this time at home, the Mavericks squeezed out a win. At Detroit, the Mavericks were able to win by three, after being up by 15 in the third quarter. Their third straight win came at Minnesota, where they won easily by 23. At Milwaukee, the Mavs were able to extend their winning streak to four. At San Antonio, the Mavericks had a chance to win the game but Carter missed a three at the buzzer. Back home and having eight of their next nine games at home, the Mavs defeated Cleveland by ten, after being down by double digits midway through the third quarter. In their last season matchup against OKC, the Mavs lost another nailbiter, by six at the end. This game marked the return of Brand into the starting lineup. At Atlanta, the Mavs wrapped up their last road game against an eastern conference team with a victory, 127–113. When Brooklyn came to town, the Mavs were unable to contain a ten-point lead from the first quarter. They lost eventually by 17 at the end. When Jason Terry returned to Dallas, he received a standing ovation by his first check-in into the game. However, the Mavs defeated Boston by ten. In another pivotal matchup, against Utah this time, the Mavs were able to win by five in the end, with the fourth quarter being safely in their hands. The Mavericks stretched their winning streak to three after an overtime victory over the Clippers. With a chance to get back to .500, the Mavs got blown out by Indiana. The Mavs ended their homestand with a hard-fought victory against the Bulls. They were down double-digits multiple times but Nowitzki managed to carry them when he hit the go-ahead three-pointer with 2.9 seconds to go. At the Lakers the Mavericks were not able to hang with them and lost by 20. At Denver, where the Nuggets held a 33–3 record, the Mavericks felt short by one when Andre Iguodala made a game winning layup with 2.8 seconds to go. At Sacramento, the Mavericks scored 41 points in the second quarter en route to a victory. At Portland, the Mavericks got a victory which put them one game under .500. After a home loss to Phoenix, the Mavericks were eliminated for the playoffs for the first time since 2000. The Mavs won an overtime game against Denver 108–105. After winning New Orleans, the Mavs reached the .500 mark for the first time since December 12 (121 days) and were able to shave their beards with Nowitzki scoring the 25,000th point during his career. Against Memphis, the Mavericks lost by six. Their last game of the season, against New Orleans, was won, so the Mavs ended the season at .500 (41–41).

== Roster ==
2012–13 Dallas Mavericks roster
Players

Pos.	No.	Player	Height	Weight	DOB	From
G	10	Josh Akognon	5 ft 11 in (1.80 m)	185 lb (84 kg)	1986–02–10	Cal State Fullerton
G	3	Rodrigue Beaubois	6 ft 2 in (1.88 m)	185 lb (84 kg)	1988–02–24	France
F/C	42	Elton Brand	6 ft 9 in (2.06 m)	254 lb (115 kg)	1979–03–11	Duke
G/F	25	Vince Carter	6 ft 6 in (1.98 m)	220 lb (100 kg)	1977–01–26	North Carolina
G	4	Darren Collison	6 ft 0 in (1.83 m)	175 lb (79 kg)	1987–08–23	UCLA
F	9	Jae Crowder	6 ft 6 in (1.98 m)	235 lb (107 kg)	1990–04–06	Marquette
G	1	Jared Cunningham	6 ft 4 in (1.93 m)	195 lb (88 kg)	1991–05–22	Oregon State
C	5	Bernard James	6 ft 10 in (2.08 m)	240 lb (109 kg)	1985–02–07	Florida State
G	13	Mike James	6 ft 2 in (1.88 m)	190 lb (86 kg)	1975–06–23	Duquesne
C	35	Chris Kaman	7 ft 0 in (2.13 m)	265 lb (120 kg)	1982–04–28	Central Michigan
F	0	Shawn Marion	6 ft 7 in (2.01 m)	228 lb (103 kg)	1978–05–07	UNLV
G	32	O. J. Mayo	6 ft 4 in (1.93 m)	210 lb (95 kg)	1987–11–05	USC
G	23	Anthony Morrow	6 ft 5 in (1.96 m)	210 lb (95 kg)	1985–09–27	Georgia Tech
F	41	Dirk Nowitzki	7 ft 0 in (2.13 m)	245 lb (111 kg)	1978–06–19	Germany
F/C	34	Brandan Wright	6 ft 10 in (2.08 m)	210 lb (95 kg)	1987–10–05	North Carolina

Coaches
Head coach
- Rick Carlisle
Assistant(s)
- Darrell Armstrong
- Tony Brown
- Brad Davis
- Monte Mathis
- Jim O'Brien
- Mike Shedd

Legend
- (DP) Unsigned draft pick
- (FA) Free agent
- (S) Suspended
- (DL) On assignment to D-League affiliate
- Injured

Roster
Updated: 2013–04–04

== Pre-season ==
2012 pre-season game log
Pre-season: 4–4 (home: 3–1; road: 1–3)

Game	Date	Team	Score	High points	High rebounds	High assists	Location Attendance	Record
1	October 6	@ Alba Berlin	W 89–84	three players (14)	Shawn Marion (11)	Darren Collison (9)	O2 World; 14,504	1–0
2	October 9	@ FC Barcelona	L 85–99	Chris Kaman (15)	Chris Kaman (10)	Darren Collison (4)	Palau Blaugrana; 16,236	1–1
3	October 15	Houston	W 123–104	O. J. Mayo; Jae Crowder (20)	Chris Kaman (11)	Darren Collison (8)	American Airlines Center; 17,245	2–1
4	October 17	Phoenix	L 94–100	Chris Kaman (16)	Vince Carter (7)	Darren Collison (6)	American Airlines Center; 17,049	2–2
5	October 20	@ Atlanta	L 94–110	Jae Crowder (15)	Elton Brand (10)	Darren Collison (5)	Philips Arena; 9,935	2–3
6	October 22	New Orleans	W 87–74	O. J. Mayo (13)	Shawn Marion (12)	Darren Collison (7)	American Airlines Center; 16,982	3–3
7	October 24	Oklahoma City	L 76–88	Jae Crowder (21)	Jae Crowder (9)	Dominique Jones (4)	Intrust Bank Arena; 15,004	3–4
8	October 26	Charlotte	W 99–82	Shawn Marion (24)	Shawn Marion (12)	O. J. Mayo (9)	American Airlines Center; 19,239	4–4

2012–13 season schedule

== Regular season ==
=== Standings ===
Southwest Division	W	L	PCT	GB	Home	Road	Div	GP
y-San Antonio Spurs	58	24	.707	–	35–6	23–18	12–4	82
x-Memphis Grizzlies	56	26	.683	2	32–9	24–17	10–6	82
x-Houston Rockets	45	37	.549	13	29–12	16–25	6–10	82
Dallas Mavericks	41	41	.500	17	24–17	17–24	7–9	82
New Orleans Hornets	27	55	.329	31	16–25	11–30	5–11	82

Western Conference
#	Team	W	L	PCT	GB	GP
1	c-Oklahoma City Thunder *	60	22	.732	–	82
2	y-San Antonio Spurs *	58	24	.707	2.0	82
3	x-Denver Nuggets *	57	25	.695	3.0	82
4	y-Los Angeles Clippers	56	26	.683	4.0	82
5	x-Memphis Grizzlies	56	26	.683	4.0	82
6	x-Golden State Warriors	47	35	.573	13.0	82
7	x-Los Angeles Lakers	45	37	.549	15.0	82
8	x-Houston Rockets	45	37	.549	15.0	82
9	Utah Jazz	43	39	.524	17.0	82
10	Dallas Mavericks	41	41	.500	19.0	82
11	Portland Trail Blazers	33	49	.402	27.0	82
12	Minnesota Timberwolves	31	51	.378	29.0	82
13	Sacramento Kings	28	54	.341	32.0	82
14	New Orleans Hornets	27	55	.329	33.0	82
15	Phoenix Suns	25	57	.305	35.0	82

=== Schedule ===
2012–13 game log
Total: 41–41 (Home: 24–17; Road: 17–24)
October: 1–1 (home: 0–0; road: 1–1)

Game	Date	Team	Score	High points	High rebounds	High assists	Location Attendance	Record
1	October 30	@ LA Lakers	W 99–91	Darren Collison (17)	Elton Brand (11)	Rodrigue Beaubois (5)	Staples Center; 18,997	1–0
2	October 31	@ Utah	L 94–113	Darren Collison (17)	Shawn Marion (11)	Darren Collison (7)	EnergySolutions Arena; 17,634	1–1

November : 6–8 (home: 5–3; road: 1–5)

Game	Date	Team	Score	High points	High rebounds	High assists	Location Attendance	Record
3	November 3	Charlotte	W 126–99	O. J. Mayo (30)	Shawn Marion (9)	Darren Collison (10)	American Airlines Center; 19,490	2–1
4	November 5	Portland	W 114–91	O. J. Mayo (32)	Shawn Marion (7)	Darren Collison (13)	American Airlines Center; 19,521	3–1
5	November 7	Toronto	W 109–104	Chris Kaman; O. J. Mayo (22)	Bernard James (9)	O. J. Mayo (6)	American Airlines Center; 19,763	4–1
6	November 9	@ New York	L 94–104	O. J. Mayo (23)	four players (7)	Darren Collison (8)	Madison Square Garden; 19,033	4–2
7	November 10	@ Charlotte	L 97–101	O. J. Mayo (22)	Brandan Wright (8)	Darren Collison (6)	Time Warner Cable Arena; 15,763	4–3
8	November 12	Minnesota	L 82–90	Darren Collison (21)	three players (5)	Rodrigue Beaubois (7)	American Airlines Center; 19,322	4–4
9	November 14	Washington	W 107–101	O. J. Mayo (25)	Elton Brand (12)	Darren Collison (5)	American Airlines Center; 19,560	5–4
10	November 16	@ Indiana	L 83–103	O. J. Mayo (19)	Chris Kaman (12)	Darren Collison (4)	Bankers Life Fieldhouse; 15,110	5–5
11	November 17	@ Cleveland	W 103–95	O. J. Mayo (19)	Shawn Marion (10)	Darren Collison (8)	Quicken Loans Arena; 18,633	6–5
12	November 19	Golden State	L 101–105	O. J. Mayo (27)	Chris Kaman (17)	Vince Carter; Darren Collison (5)	American Airlines Center; 20,034	6–6
13	November 21	New York	W 114–111	O. J. Mayo (27)	Elton Brand (8)	Darren Collison (7)	American Airlines Center; 20,157	7–6
14	November 24	LA Lakers	L 89–115	Vince Carter (16)	Shawn Marion (8)	Rodrigue Beaubois (6)	American Airlines Center; 20,423	7–7
15	November 27	@ Philadelphia	L 98–100	Chris Kaman (20)	Elton Brand; Shawn Marion (8)	O. J. Mayo (7)	Wells Fargo Center; 15,107	7–8
16	November 28	@ Chicago	L 78–101	Shawn Marion (18)	Elton Brand (6)	Dominique Jones (5)	United Center; 21,575	7–9

December : 5–10 (home: 3–3; road: 2–7)

Game	Date	Team	Score	High points	High rebounds	High assists	Location Attendance	Record
17	December 1	Detroit	W 92–77	O. J. Mayo (27)	Elton Brand (12)	Darren Collison (8)	American Airlines Center; 20,285	8–9
18	December 5	@ LA Clippers	L 90–112	Vince Carter (16)	Elton Brand (9)	O. J. Mayo (7)	Staples Center; 19,060	8–10
19	December 6	@ Phoenix	W 97–94	O. J. Mayo (23)	Elton Brand; Chris Kaman (7)	O. J. Mayo (5)	US Airways Center; 17,517	9–10
20	December 8	@ Houston	W 116–109	O. J. Mayo (40)	O. J. Mayo (8)	Darren Collison; Derek Fisher (5)	Toyota Center; 15,726	10–10
21	December 10	Sacramento	W 119–96	O. J. Mayo (19)	O. J. Mayo (7)	Derek Fisher (6)	American Airlines Center; 19,737	11–10
22	December 12	@ Boston	L 115–117	O. J. Mayo (24)	Shawn Marion (11)	Shawn Marion (7)	TD Garden; 18,624	11–11
23	December 14	@ Toronto	L 74–95	Chris Kaman (15)	Shawn Marion (13)	Derek Fisher (5)	Air Canada Centre; 18,624	11–12
24	December 15	@ Minnesota	L 106–114	Derek Fisher; O. J. Mayo (20)	Shawn Marion (10)	O. J. Mayo (6)	Target Center; 18,173	11–13
25	December 18	Philadelphia	W 107–100	O. J. Mayo (26)	Shawn Marion (9)	O. J. Mayo (8)	American Airlines Center; 20,162	12–13
26	December 20	Miami	L 95–110	Jae Crowder (15)	Bernard James; Shawn Marion (9)	Dominique Jones (7)	American Airlines Center; 20,160	12–14
27	December 21	@ Memphis	L 82–92	Vince Carter; Shawn Marion (14)	Shawn Marion (11)	Dominique Jones (7)	FedExForum; 17,677	12–15
28	December 23	@ San Antonio	L 91–129	Darren Collison (15)	Dirk Nowitzki (6)	O. J. Mayo (6)	AT&T Center; 18,581	12–16
29	December 27	@ Oklahoma City	L 105–111	Darren Collison (32)	Shawn Marion (9)	Shawn Marion (7)	Chesapeake Energy Arena; 18,203	12–17
30	December 28	Denver	L 85–106	O. J. Mayo (15)	Chris Kaman (8)	Darren Collison (4)	American Airlines Center; 20,439	12–18
31	December 30	San Antonio	L 86–111	Darren Collison (18)	Elton Brand (10)	Darren Collison (8)	American Airlines Center; 19,928	12–19

January : 7–8 (home: 4–3; road: 3–5)

Game	Date	Team	Score	High points	High rebounds	High assists	Location Attendance	Record
32	January 1	@ Washington	W 103–94	Vince Carter (23)	Shawn Marion (14)	Darren Collison (8)	Verizon Center; 14,456	13–19
33	January 2	@ Miami	L 109–119	O. J. Mayo (30)	Chris Kaman (10)	O. J. Mayo (6)	American Airlines Arena; 20,102	13–20
34	January 5	New Orleans	L 96–99	Dirk Nowitzki (20)	Shawn Marion (9)	Dirk Nowitzki; O. J. Mayo (5)	American Airlines Center; 18,600	13–21
35	January 7	@ Utah	L 94–100	Dirk Nowitzki (20)	three players (9)	Darren Collison (5)	EnergySolutions Arena; 20,338	13–22
36	January 9	@ LA Clippers	L 93–99	Darren Collison (22)	Shawn Marion (7)	Darren Collison (6)	Staples Center; 19,362	13–23
37	January 10	@ Sacramento	W 117–112	O. J. Mayo (24)	Shawn Marion; O. J. Mayo (10)	Jae Crowder; O. J. Mayo (5)	New Sacramento arena 14,011	14–23
38	January 12	Memphis	W 104–83	Shawn Marion (20)	Elton Brand (9)	Darren Collison (6)	American Airlines Center; 19,984	15–23
39	January 14	Minnesota	W 113–98	Darren Collison (23)	Shawn Marion (8)	Darren Collison; O. J. Mayo (9)	American Airlines Center; 19,486	16–23
40	January 16	Houston	W 105–100	Dirk Nowitzki (19)	Elton Brand (10)	O. J. Mayo (8)	American Airlines Center; 20,147	17–23
41	January 18	Oklahoma City	L 114–117	Vince Carter (29)	Elton Brand (13)	O. J. Mayo (7)	American Airlines Center; 20,434	17–24
42	January 20	@ Orlando	W 111–105	Shawn Marion (20)	Shawn Marion (10)	Darren Collison (9)	Amway Center; 18,192	18–24
43	January 25	San Antonio	L 107–113	Rodrigue Beaubois (19)	Elton Brand (13)	O. J. Mayo (7)	American Airlines Center; 19,884	18–25
44	January 27	Phoenix	W 110–95	Shawn Marion; Dirk Nowitzki (18)	Shawn Marion (9)	O. J. Mayo (6)	American Airlines Center; 20,305	19–25
45	January 29	@ Portland	L 104–106	Dirk Nowitzki (26)	Shawn Marion (9)	Darren Collison; O. J. Mayo (9)	Rose Garden; 18,888	19–26
46	January 31	@ Golden State	L 97–100	O. J. Mayo (25)	Shawn Marion (17)	Darren Collison (7)	Oracle Arena; 19,596	19–27

February : 6–5 (home: 4–3; road: 2–2)

Game	Date	Team	Score	High points	High rebounds	High assists	Location Attendance	Record
47	February 1	@ Phoenix	W 109–99	O. J. Mayo (20)	Shawn Marion (11)	Darren Collison (6)	US Airways Center; 16,304	20–27
48	February 4	@ Oklahoma City	L 91–112	Shawn Marion (23)	Elton Brand; Brandan Wright (7)	O. J. Mayo (6)	Chesapeake Energy Arena; 18,203	20–28
49	February 6	Portland	W 105–99	O. J. Mayo (28)	Elton Brand; Shawn Marion (10)	Darren Collison (7)	American Airlines Center; 19,746	21–28
50	February 9	Golden State	W 116–91	Shawn Marion (26)	Elton Brand; Shawn Marion (11)	O. J. Mayo (9)	American Airlines Center; 20,355	22–28
51	February 11	Atlanta	L 101–105	Dirk Nowitzki (24)	Dirk Nowitzki (7)	Darren Collison (10)	American Airlines Center; 19,654	22–29
52	February 13	Sacramento	W 123–100	Vince Carter (26)	Shawn Marion (9)	Darren Collison (9)	American Airlines Center; 19,892	23–29
All-Star Break
53	February 20	Orlando	W 111–96	Elton Brand; Shawn Marion (17)	Dirk Nowitzki (9)	Darren Collison (9)	American Airlines Center; 19,965	24–29
54	February 22	@ New Orleans	W 104–100	Dirk Nowitzki (25)	Vince Carter (9)	O. J. Mayo (9)	New Orleans Arena; 16,538	25–29
55	February 24	LA Lakers	L 99–103	Dirk Nowitzki (30)	Dirk Nowitzki (13)	Darren Collison; Mike James (4)	American Airlines Center; 20,440	25–30
56	February 26	Milwaukee	L 90–95	Dirk Nowitzki (21)	Dirk Nowitzki (20)	Darren Collison (8)	American Airlines Center; 19,870	25–31
57	February 27	@ Memphis	L 84–90	Shawn Marion (16)	Shawn Marion (8)	Darren Collison (6)	FedExForum; 16,017	25–32

March : 11–5 (home: 6–3; road: 5–2)

Game	Date	Team	Score	High points	High rebounds	High assists	Location Attendance	Record
58	March 1	@ Brooklyn	W 98–90	Vince Carter; Dirk Nowitzki (20)	Dirk Nowitzki (8)	three players (3)	Barclays Center; 17,732	26–32
59	March 3	@ Houston	L 103–136	O. J. Mayo (18)	Shawn Marion (8)	O. J. Mayo; Dirk Nowitzki (4)	Toyota Center; 18,123	26–33
60	March 6	Houston	W 112–108	Shawn Marion; Dirk Nowitzki (22)	Vince Carter (7)	O. J. Mayo (12)	American Airlines Center; 20,344	27–33
61	March 8	@ Detroit	W 102–99	O. J. Mayo (22)	Dirk Nowitzki; Vince Carter (7)	Darren Collison (8)	The Palace of Auburn Hills; 19,504	28–33
62	March 10	@ Minnesota	W 100–77	Vince Carter (22)	Elton Brand (12)	Darren Collison (8)	Target Center; 15,209	29–33
63	March 12	@ Milwaukee	W 115–108	Vince Carter (23)	Dirk Nowitzki (11)	Mike James (7)	BMO Harris Bradley Center; 14,154	30–33
64	March 14	@ San Antonio	L 91–92	Dirk Nowitzki (21)	Dirk Nowitzki (11)	Mike James (5)	AT&T Center; 18,581	30–34
65	March 15	Cleveland	W 96–86	Rodrigue Beaubois (18)	Jae Crowder (14)	Rodrigue Beaubois; Darren Collison (5)	American Airlines Center; 20,482	31–34
66	March 17	Oklahoma City	L 101–107	Dirk Nowitzki (23)	Jae Crowder; Brandan Wright (7)	Mike James (4)	American Airlines Center; 20,284	31–35
67	March 18	@ Atlanta	W 127–113	Darren Collison (24)	Brandan Wright (8)	Darren Collison; Dirk Nowitzki (5)	Philips Arena; 14,505	32–35
68	March 20	Brooklyn	L 96–113	Dirk Nowitzki (16)	Dirk Nowitzki (6)	Mike James (7)	American Airlines Center; 19,962	32–36
69	March 22	Boston	W 104–94	Brandan Wright (23)	Shawn Marion (13)	O. J. Mayo (9)	American Airlines Center; 20,387	33–36
70	March 24	Utah	W 113–108	Mike James (19)	Dirk Nowitzki; Shawn Marion (6)	Darren Collison; Mike James (9)	American Airlines Center; 19,821	34–36
71	March 26	LA Clippers	W 109–102	Dirk Nowitzki (33)	Dirk Nowitzki (9)	Mike James (6)	American Airlines Center; 20,291	35–36
72	March 28	Indiana	L 78–103	Dirk Nowitzki (21)	Elton Brand (8)	Darren Collison (8)	American Airlines Center; 20,037	35–37
73	March 30	Chicago	W 100–98	Dirk Nowitzki (35)	Brandan Wright (13)	Mike James (7)	American Airlines Center; 20,502	36–37

April : 5–4 (home: 2–2; road: 3–2)

Game	Date	Team	Score	High points	High rebounds	High assists	Location Attendance	Record
74	April 2	@ LA Lakers	L 81–101	Chris Kaman (14)	Shawn Marion (7)	Darren Collison; Dirk Nowitzki (6)	Staples Center; 18,997	36–38
75	April 4	@ Denver	L 94–95	Brandan Wright (16)	Chris Kaman (9)	Vince Carter; O. J. Mayo (6)	Pepsi Center; 19,155	36–39
76	April 5	@ Sacramento	W 117–108	Shawn Marion (25)	Shawn Marion (12)	Vince Carter; Darren Collison (8)	New Sacramento arena 13,903	37–39
77	April 7	@ Portland	W 96–91	Chris Kaman (26)	Chris Kaman (11)	Darren Collison (8)	Rose Garden; 20,228	38–39
78	April 10	Phoenix	L 91–102	Shawn Marion (22)	Shawn Marion (9)	O. J. Mayo (6)	American Airlines Center; 19,725	38–40
79	April 12	Denver	W 108–105	Vince Carter; Dirk Nowitzki (22)	Vince Carter (12)	Vince Carter (7)	American Airlines Center; 20,368	39–40
80	April 14	@ New Orleans	W 107–89	Shawn Marion (21)	three players (7)	Shawn Marion (6)	New Orleans Arena; 17,246	40–40
81	April 15	Memphis	L 97–103	Dirk Nowitzki (26)	Shawn Marion (8)	Vince Carter; Darren Collison (4)	American Airlines Center; 19,833	40–41
82	April 17	New Orleans	W 99–87	Darren Collison (25)	Dirk Nowitzki (9)	three players (4)	American Airlines Center; 19,833	41–41

2012–13 season schedule

== Player statistics ==
=== Regular season ===
Player	POS	GP	GS	MP	REB	AST	STL	BLK	PTS	MPG	RPG	APG	SPG	BPG	PPG
O. J. Mayo	SG	82	82	2,913	291	361	93	23	1,255	35.5	3.5	4.4	1.1	.3	15.3
Darren Collison	PG	81	47	2,372	219	415	100	8	972	29.3	2.7	5.1	1.2	.1	12.0
Vince Carter	SF	81	3	2,093	334	194	74	44	1,088	25.8	4.1	2.4	.9	.5	13.4
Jae Crowder	SF	78	16	1,353	187	94	63	17	392	17.3	2.4	1.2	.8	.2	5.0
Elton Brand	C	72	18	1,527	430	70	50	90	518	21.2	6.0	1.0	.7	1.3	7.2
Shawn Marion	PF	67	67	2,010	525	163	75	47	812	30.0	7.8	2.4	1.1	.7	12.1
Chris Kaman	C	66	52	1,363	372	51	29	52	693	20.7	5.6	.8	.4	.8	10.5
Brandan Wright	C	64	16	1,149	260	38	26	76	541	18.0	4.1	.6	.4	1.2	8.5
Dirk Nowitzki	PF	53	47	1,661	363	132	38	37	917	31.3	6.8	2.5	.7	.7	17.3
Dahntay Jones^{†}	SF	50	15	635	70	28	10	5	174	12.7	1.4	.6	.2	.1	3.5
Bernard James	C	46	11	457	131	6	12	38	131	9.9	2.8	.1	.3	.8	2.8
Mike James	PG	45	23	862	72	139	26	3	273	19.2	1.6	3.1	.6	.1	6.1
Rodrigue Beaubois	PG	45	0	549	57	84	19	4	181	12.2	1.3	1.9	.4	.1	4.0
Dominique Jones	PG	29	3	338	45	83	14	2	116	11.7	1.6	2.9	.5	.1	4.0
Anthony Morrow^{†}	SG	17	0	82	4	4	1	0	39	4.8	.2	.2	.1	.0	2.3
Troy Murphy	PF	14	1	256	49	7	10	6	65	18.3	3.5	.5	.7	.4	4.6
Derek Fisher^{†}	PG	9	9	229	15	31	5	2	77	25.4	1.7	3.4	.6	.2	8.6
Jared Cunningham	SG	8	0	26	3	1	1	0	16	3.3	.4	.1	.1	.0	2.0
Chris Douglas-Roberts	SG	6	0	63	5	4	2	0	17	10.5	.8	.7	.3	.0	2.8
Josh Akognon	PG	3	0	9	1	1	0	0	5	3.0	.3	.3	.0	.0	1.7
Chris Wright	SG	3	0	4	0	0	0	0	2	1.3	.0	.0	.0	.0	.7
Eddy Curry	C	2	0	25	4	0	0	0	9	12.5	2.0	.0	.0	.0	4.5
Justin Dentmon	PG	2	0	4	0	0	0	0	0	2.0	.0	.0	.0	.0	.0

- ^{†} Denotes player spent time with another team in the season. Stats reflect time with the Mavericks only.

== Injuries ==
During the first preseason game at Berlin, Rodrigue Beaubois injured his left foot. Dirk Nowitzki sat out the second game of the preseason because of a right knee effusion. Both missed the next two preseason games against Houston and Phoenix.

On October 19, 2012, it was announced that Nowitzki underwent arthroscopic surgery on his right knee and missed games until late December.

Chris Kaman had a strained calf and missed the preseason games against Atlanta, the New Orleans and the rest of preseason action. He was also out the first two games of the regular season.

Brandan Wright was out against Charlotte due to a twisted ankle.

Beaubois missed the games against Charlotte, Portland and Toronto because he twisted his left ankle during practice.

Shawn Marion suffered a sprained MCL in the game against Portland in his left knee and missed the next three games.

Troy Murphy started the game against New York but was unable to play in the second half due to an illness.

Darren Collison had a sprained right middle finger and missed the game against Chicago.

Marion missed the game at Houston due to a strained groin and Sacramento.

Dominique Jones was ill and was not able to play against Sacramento.

Elton Brand was out against Philadelphia due to a sore groin.

Derek Fisher left the game against Philadelphia after five minutes with a right patellar tendon strain and missed the games against Miami, Memphis and San Antonio.

Brand (groin) and Wright (ankle) missed the game against Miami. Brand also missed the game against Memphis, while Wright was back.

Kaman missed the games against Portland, Golden State and Phoenix.

Nowitzki was out against Golden State and Phoenix.

Marion was out late in the year and missed some games due to a calf injury.

Beaubois fractured the second metacarpal in his left hand during a game against Oklahoma. He successfully underwent surgery on 20 March and will miss the remainder of the season.

Brand missed three games late in the season and Nowitzki sat out the fourth quarter at Portland.

== Transactions ==
=== Trades ===
June 28, 2012	To Dallas Mavericks Draft rights to Jared Cunningham (from Cavaliers); Draft rights to Bernard James(from Cavaliers); Draft rights to Jae Crowder (from Cavaliers)	To Cleveland Cavaliers Kelenna Azubuike; Draft rights to Tyler Zeller (from Mavericks)
June 29, 2012	To Dallas Mavericks Cash considerations	To Los Angeles Clippers Lamar Odom
July 11, 2012	To Dallas Mavericks Darren Collison; Dahntay Jones	To Indiana Pacers Ian Mahinmi
February 21, 2013	To Dallas Mavericks Anthony Morrow	To Atlanta Hawks Dahntay Jones

=== Free agents ===
==== Additions ====
Player	Signed	Former Team
Chris Kaman	Signed 1-year contract worth $8 million	New Orleans Hornets
Elton Brand	Signed 1-year contract worth $2.1 million	Philadelphia 76ers
O. J. Mayo	Signed 2-year contract worth $8 million	Memphis Grizzlies
Delonte West	Signed 1-year contract	Dallas Mavericks
Eddy Curry	Signed 1-year contract	Miami Heat
Troy Murphy	Signed 1-year contract	Los Angeles Lakers
Derek Fisher		Oklahoma City Thunder
Chris Douglas-Roberts		Texas Legends
Mike James	Signed 1-year contract	Texas Legends
Chris Wright	Signed 10-day contract	Iowa Energy
Justin Dentmon	Signed 10-day contract	Texas Legends
Josh Akognon	Signed 1-year contract	Liaoning Dinosaurs

==== Subtractions ====
Player	Reason Left	New Team
Jason Kidd	Signed 3-year contract worth $9 Million	New York Knicks
Jason Terry	Signed 3-year contract worth $15 Million	Boston Celtics
Brendan Haywood	Amnestied	Charlotte Bobcats
Delonte West	Waived	
Eddy Curry	Waived	Zhejiang Golden Bulls
Troy Murphy	Waived	
Derek Fisher	Released	
Chris Douglas-Roberts	Waived	
Dominique Jones	Waived	

=== Milestones ===
- On December 27, Shawn Marion appeared in his 1,000th career regular-season game against the Phoenix Suns.
- On February 13, Vince Carter recorded his 1,600th made three-pointer during a game against the Sacramento Kings.
- On March 6, Shawn Marion moved to 25th place on the NBA's all-time steals list during a game against the Houston Rockets.
- On March 18, Vince Carter recorded his 22,000th point during a game against the Atlanta Hawks.
- On March 20, Dirk Nowitzki recorded his 9,000th rebound during a game against the Brooklyn Nets.
- On April 14, Dirk Nowitzki recorded his 25,000th point during a game against the New Orleans Hornets.
- On April 15, Vince Carter moved to 27th place on the NBA's all-time scoring list during a game against the Memphis Grizzlies.
