= Darren Collison =

American basketball player (born 1987)

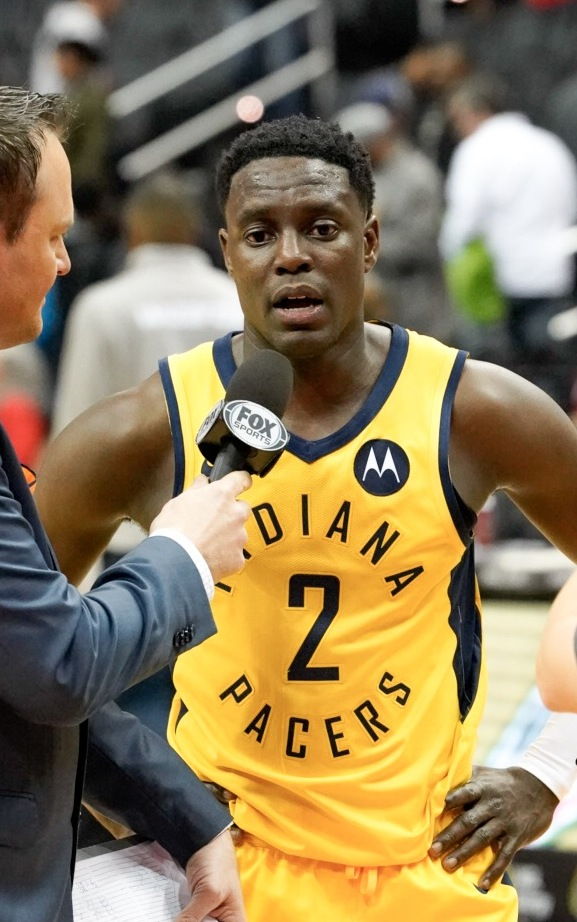
- Collison with the Indiana Pacers in 2019

Personal information
- Born: August 23, 1987 (age 39) Rancho Cucamonga, California, U.S.
- Listed height: 6 ft 0 in (1.83 m)
- Listed weight: 160 lb (73 kg)

Career information
- High school: Etiwanda (Rancho Cucamonga, California)
- College: UCLA (2005–2009)
- NBA draft: 2009: 1st round, 21st overall pick
- Drafted by: New Orleans Hornets
- Playing career: 2009–2019, 2021–2022
- Position: Point guard
- Number: 2, 4, 7, 21

Career history
- 2009–2010: New Orleans Hornets
- 2010–2012: Indiana Pacers
- 2012–2013: Dallas Mavericks
- 2013–2014: Los Angeles Clippers
- 2014–2017: Sacramento Kings
- 2017–2019: Indiana Pacers
- 2021–2022: Los Angeles Lakers
- 2022: South Bay Lakers

Career highlights
- NBA All-Rookie First Team (2010); Third-team All-American – NABC (2009); Third-team All-American – AP (2008); Frances Pomeroy Naismith Award (2009); 2× First-team All-Pac-10 (2007, 2009); Second-team All-Pac-10 (2008); Fourth-team Parade All-American (2005)

Career NBA statistics
- Points: 8,857 (12.5 ppg)
- Rebounds: 1,885 (2.7 rpg)
- Assists: 3,543 (5.0 apg)
- Stats at NBA.com
- Stats at Basketball Reference

Darren Michael Collison (born August 23, 1987) is an American former professional basketball player who played in the National Basketball Association (NBA). Collison played four seasons of college basketball for the UCLA Bruins. He earned All-Pac-10 conference honors three times, and won the Frances Pomeroy Naismith Award his senior year as the top college player standing 6 feet 0 inches (1.83 m) or under. He was drafted by the New Orleans Hornets in the first round with the 21st overall pick of the 2009 NBA draft. Collison also played for the Indiana Pacers, Dallas Mavericks, Los Angeles Clippers, Sacramento Kings, and Los Angeles Lakers.

== Early life ==
Collison was born in Rancho Cucamonga, California to parents Dennis and June Griffith, who were both elite track and field athletes for Guyana. As a senior at Etiwanda High School under coach Dave Kleckner, Collison was named a fourth-team Parade All-American.

Considered a four-star recruit by Rivals.com, Collison was listed as the No. 16 point guard and the No. 100 player in the nation in 2005.

== College career ==
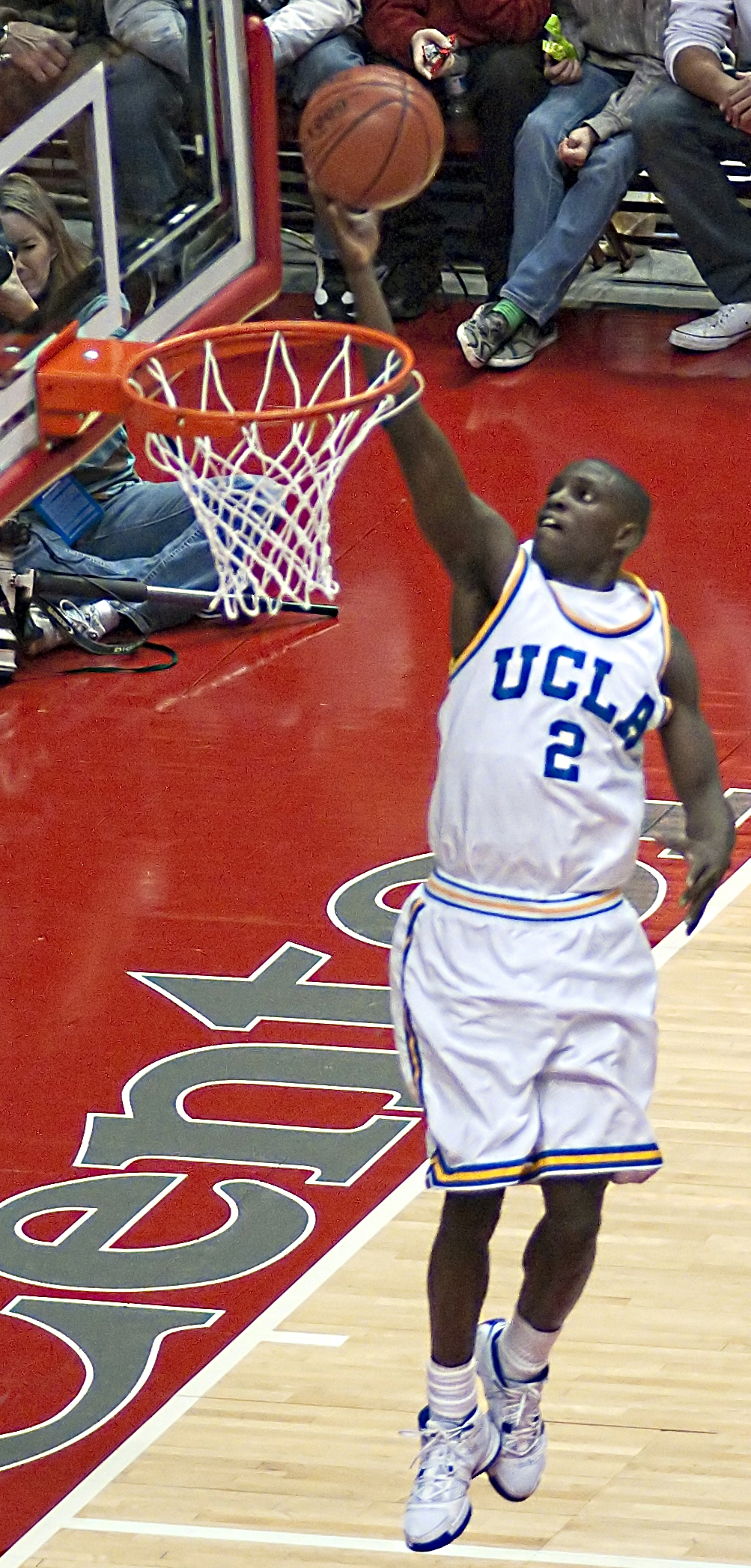
Collison with UCLA in 2008

He was a backup to Jordan Farmar in the Bruins' 2005–06 season, becoming the starting point guard the following season. He was awarded the MVP of the Maui Invitational Tournament in December 2006 and was named the Pacific-10 Conference Player of the Week on December 4, 2006, and again on February 18, 2007. During the 2006–07 season, Collison averaged 2.2 steals per game—the most in the Pacific-10 Conference. He also averaged 5.7 assists (2nd in the Pac-10), as well as a three-point field goal percentage of 44.7 percent.

Collison returned to UCLA for his junior and senior years and ended up playing in a total of 142 games at UCLA, tied for the most ever. In his senior year in 2008–09, he was named to the All-Pac-10 team after averaging 14.4 points, 4.7 assists, and 1.6 steals per game. He led the conference in free throw percentage, and was third in assists, steals, and assists-to-turnover ratio. Collison won the Frances Pomeroy Naismith Award that year, awarded to the best college player 6 ft 0 in (1.83 m) or shorter. He was also named the Bruins' co-Most Valuable Player (MVP) along with Josh Shipp. Collison and fellow senior teammates Shipp and Alfred Aboya finished their careers as the winningest class in UCLA history with 123 wins. The distinction was relative, as John Wooden's legendary teams played shorter seasons and freshmen were ineligible.

== Professional career ==
=== New Orleans Hornets (2009–2010) ===
Collison was widely considered to be one of the top point guard prospects in the 2009 NBA Draft coming out of UCLA. He was selected in the first round with the 21st overall pick by the New Orleans Hornets.

With Chris Paul out for months at two separate times during the 2009–10 season, Collison became the starting point guard. Collison handed out a Hornets rookie-record 18 assists and scored 17 points on January 30, 2010, when New Orleans ended Memphis's 11-game home winning streak with a 113–111 overtime victory. Later on March 8, 2010, Collison broke his own record with a Hornets rookie-record 20 assists (along with 16 points) in a 135–131 victory over the Golden State Warriors. In a game against the Indiana Pacers on February 19, 2010, Collison became only the second rookie of the 2009–10 season to get a triple-double with 18 points, 13 rebounds, and 12 assists. He finished 4th in the NBA Rookie of the Year voting and averaged 18.8 points and 9.1 assists in the 37 games as a starter, but had four turnovers a contest as a starter in his first NBA season.

=== Indiana Pacers (2010–2012) ===
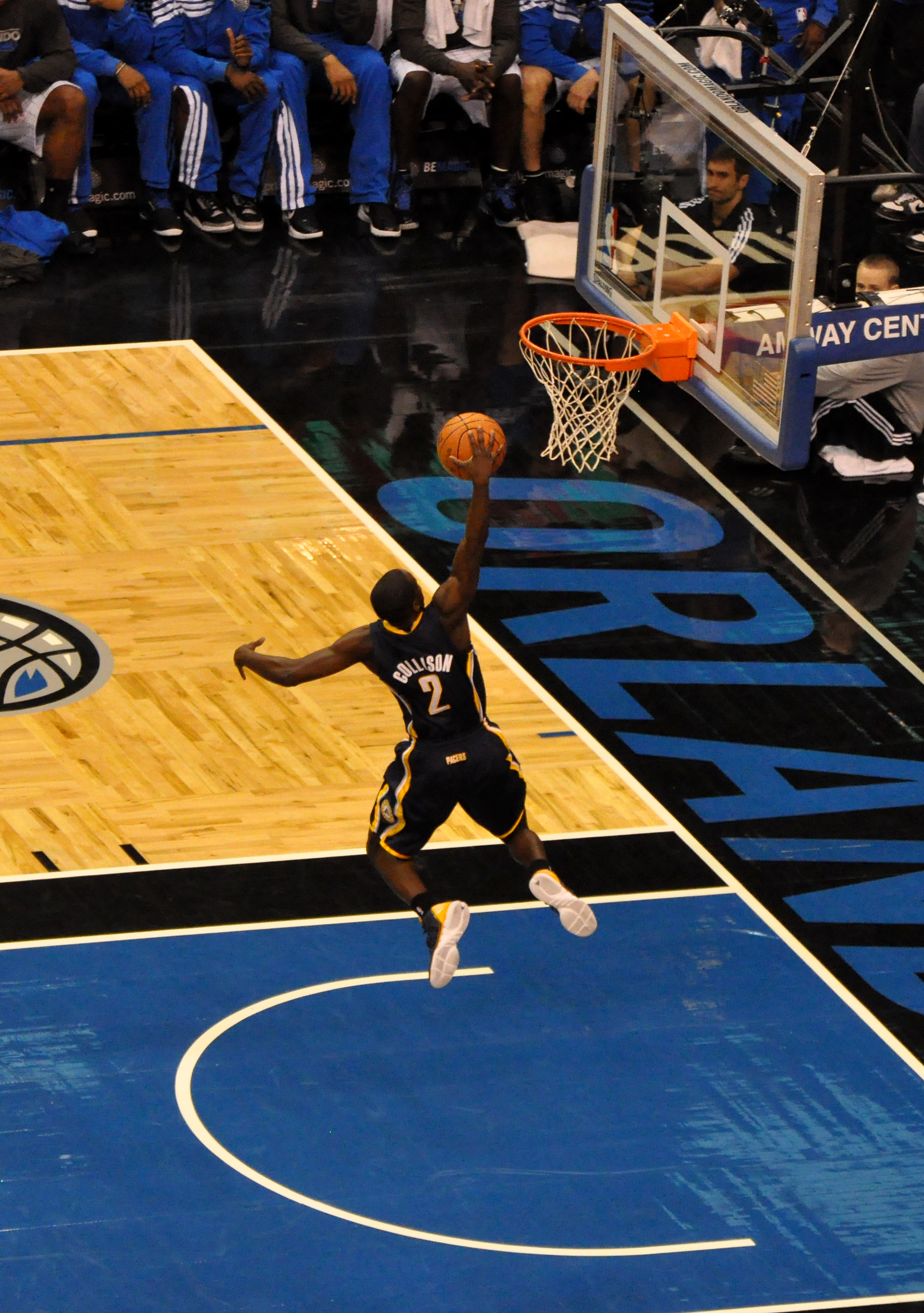
Collison with the Pacers in May 2012

On August 11, 2010, the Hornets traded Collison and James Posey to the Indiana Pacers in a four-team, five-player deal that also sent Troy Murphy to the New Jersey Nets, Trevor Ariza to the New Orleans Hornets and Courtney Lee to the Houston Rockets.

=== Dallas Mavericks (2012–2013) ===
On July 12, 2012, Collison and Dahntay Jones were traded to the Dallas Mavericks for Ian Mahinmi. Collison became the Mavericks' starting point guard, replacing Jason Kidd who left as a free agent. Collison was a key player in Dallas' 4–1 start in 2012–13, but he struggled as they lost 8 of their next 11. After starting the team's first 14 games, Collison came off the bench for one game. He missed the next game with a sprained right middle finger, prompting Dallas to sign Derek Fisher. Fisher started in his first game with the Mavericks, while Collison remained a reserve. 14 games later, on December 27, 2012, he regained the starting job.

=== Los Angeles Clippers (2013–2014) ===
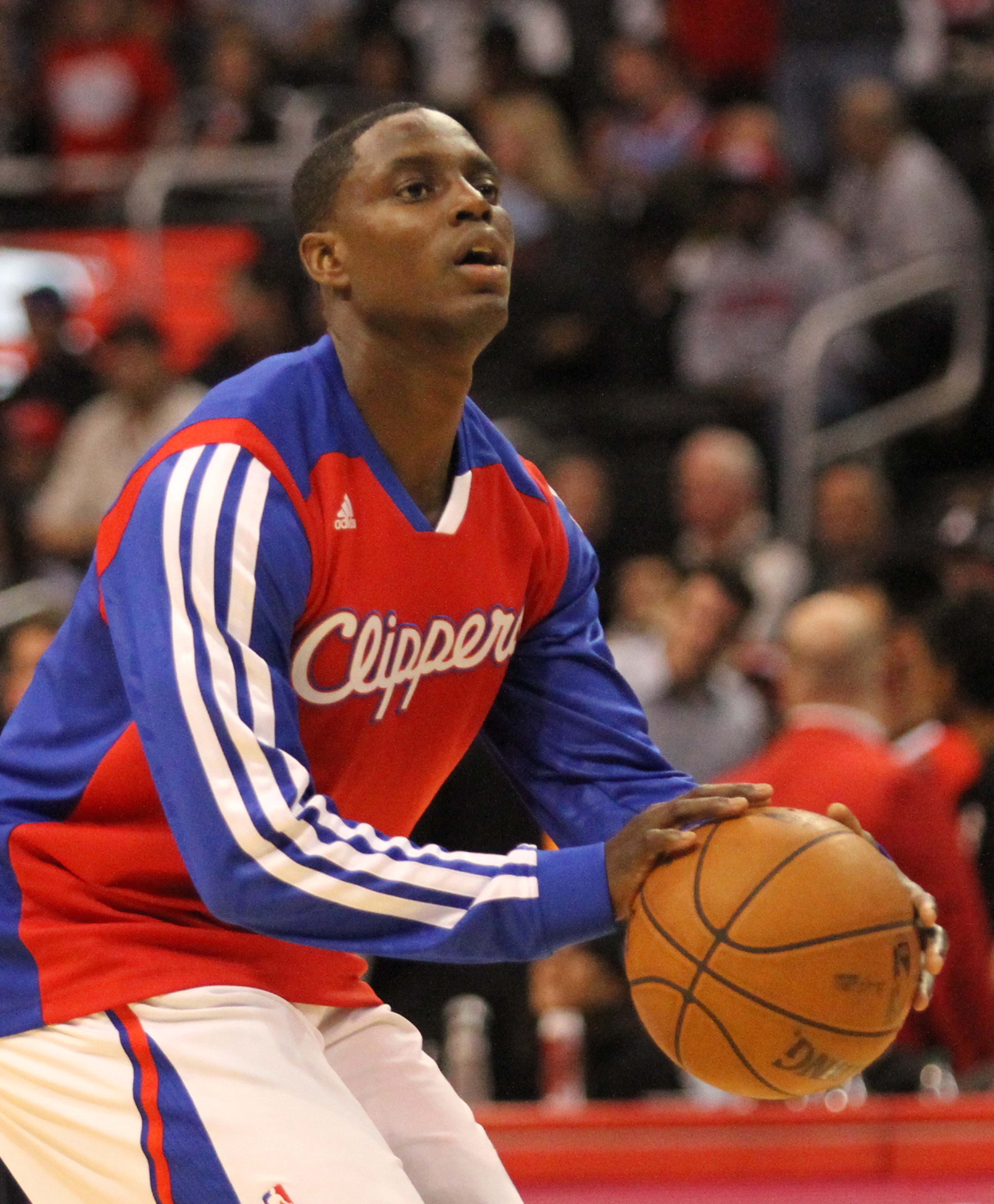
Collison with the Clippers in 2013

On July 10, 2013, Collison signed a deal with the Los Angeles Clippers. He again backed up Chris Paul, who was also on the Clippers. When Paul was out 18 games with an injured shoulder, Collison started and averaged 13.3 points and 6.5 assists in 32.6 minutes. The Clippers went 12–6 in that span, and coach Doc Rivers said the team "weathered the storm" without their All-Star point guard; he called Collison's play "the key." In Game 4 of the second round of the 2014 NBA Playoffs against the Oklahoma City Thunder, the Clippers overcame a 22-point deficit to tie the series at 2–2, as Collison scored 12 of his 18 points in the final quarter to help lead the team to a 101–99 win.

=== Sacramento Kings (2014–2017) ===
On July 12, 2014, Collison signed a three-year, $16 million deal with the Sacramento Kings. The Kings offered him a starting job at point guard, and the Clippers were unable to match either the deal or the playing time.

On December 27, 2014, Collison had a season-best game with 27 points and 10 assists in a 135–129 overtime win over the New York Knicks. On February 26, 2015, he was ruled out for three to six weeks with a right hip flexor. Collison was suspended for the first eight games of the 2016–17 season after pleading guilty on a misdemeanor charge of domestic battery.

=== Return to Indiana (2017–2019) ===
On July 7, 2017, Collison signed with the Indiana Pacers, returning to the franchise for a second stint. He had knee surgery in early February 2018, returning to the Pacers' line-up in mid-March. After gradually improving his three-point shooting throughout his career, Collison led the league with a career-best 47% 3-point percentage in 2017–18.

On December 10, 2018, in a 109–101 win over the Washington Wizards, Collison had 17 assists, his highest single-game total with Indiana. He ended the 2018–19 season with averages of 11 points and six assists.

On June 28, 2019, Collison announced his retirement from the NBA. As a Jehovah's Witness, he cited religious reasons for retiring. He had been expected to draw multiple contract offers for around $10 million per season.

=== Los Angeles Lakers (2021–2022) ===
On December 24, 2021, Collison came out of retirement, signing a 10-day contract with the Los Angeles Lakers.

=== South Bay Lakers (2022) ===
On March 24, 2022, Collison signed with the South Bay Lakers.

== Career statistics ==
Legend
GP	Games played	GS	Games started	MPG	Minutes per game
FG%	Field goal percentage	3P%	3-point field goal percentage	FT%	Free throw percentage
RPG	Rebounds per game	APG	Assists per game	SPG	Steals per game
BPG	Blocks per game	PPG	Points per game	**Bold**	Career high

*	Led the league

=== NBA ===
==== Regular season ====
Year	Team	GP	GS	MPG	FG%	3P%	FT%	RPG	APG	SPG	BPG	PPG
2009–10	New Orleans	76	37	27.8	.477	.400	.851	2.5	5.7	1.0	.1	12.4
2010–11	Indiana	79	**79**	29.9	.457	.331	.871	2.8	5.1	1.1	.2	13.2
2011–12	Indiana	60	56	31.3	.440	.362	.830	3.1	4.8	.8	.2	10.3
2012–13	Dallas	**81**	47	29.3	.471	.353	.880	2.7	5.1	1.2	.1	12.0
2013–14	L.A. Clippers	80	35	25.9	.467	.376	.857	2.4	3.7	1.2	.2	11.4
2014–15	Sacramento	45	45	**34.8**	.473	.373	.788	**3.2**	5.6	**1.5**	**.3**	**16.1**
2015–16	Sacramento	74	15	30.0	.486	.401	.858	2.3	4.3	1.0	.1	14.0
2016–17	Sacramento	68	63	30.3	.476	.417	.860	2.2	4.6	1.0	.1	13.2
2017–18	Indiana	69	64	29.2	**.495**	**.468***	**.882**	2.6	5.3	1.3	.2	12.4
2018–19	Indiana	76	76	28.2	.467	.407	.832	3.1	**6.0**	1.4	.1	11.2
2021–22	L.A. Lakers	3	0	12.3	.286	.000	–	1.3	.7	.3	.0	1.3
Career		711	518	29.3	.471	.394	.853	2.7	5.0	1.2	.1	12.5

==== Playoffs ====
Year	Team	GP	GS	MPG	FG%	3P%	FT%	RPG	APG	SPG	BPG	PPG
2011	Indiana	5	5	29.2	.391	**.667**	.636	2.6	4.0	1.0	**.4**	9.4
2012	Indiana	11	0	18.6	**.514**	.364	.870	1.3	3.0	**1.3**	.0	8.7
2014	L.A. Clippers	**13**	0	19.2	.389	.083	.867	2.1	2.4	.5	.1	8.5
2018	Indiana	7	**7**	**30.6**	.456	.348	.750	**3.0**	**4.7**	1.0	.0	11.3
2019	Indiana	4	4	29.3	.422	.364	**1.000**	**3.0**	4.0	.5	.0	**12.0**
Career		36	12	22.6	.438	.327	.824	2.1	3.3	.9	.1	9.2

=== College ===
Year	Team	GP	GS	MPG	FG%	3P%	FT%	RPG	APG	SPG	BPG	PPG
2005–06	UCLA	**39**	2	19.2	.402	.328	.784	1.8	2.3	.9	**.1**	5.5
2006–07	UCLA	35	**35**	33.0	.478	.447	.810	2.3	**5.7**	**2.2**	**.1**	12.7
2007–08	UCLA	33	32	**34.7**	.481	**.525**	.872	**2.6**	3.8	1.8	**.1**	**14.5**
2008–09	UCLA	35	**35**	31.5	**.509**	.394	**.897**	2.4	4.7	1.6	**.1**	14.4
Career		142	104	29.2	.475	.435	.851	2.3	4.1	1.6	.1	11.5

== Personal life ==
Collison is the son of June and Dennis Collison. His parents were elite track and field athletes. His mother represented Guyana at the 1984 Summer Olympics in Los Angeles.

On May 31, 2016 Collison was arrested for domestic violence after his girlfriend was found visibly injured.

Collison is the founder and CEO of ProsVision, an Orange County-based basketball training facility.

== Awards and recognition ==
- NBA 3-point field goal percentage leader (2018)
- 2004 CIF Southern Section I-AA Player of the Year
- 2005 CIF Southern Section I-AA Player of the Year
- 2007 All-Pac-10 First Team
- 2008 All-Pac-10 Second Team
- 2008 Pac-10 Conference tournament Most Valuable Player
- 2008 Associated Press Third Team All-American
- 2008 Collegeinsider.com All-Defensive Team (along with teammate Russell Westbrook)
- 2009 All-Pac-10 First Team
- 2009 honorable mention in the AP All-America basketball teams.
- 2009 UCLA Bruins co-MVP (along with Josh Shipp)

== See also ==
- List of NBA annual three-point field goal percentage leaders
- List of people banned or suspended by the NBA
