= 2012–13 Portland Trail Blazers season =

NBA professional basketball team season

- Head coach: Terry Stotts
- General manager: Neil Olshey
- Owners: Paul Allen
- Arena: Rose Garden

Results
- Record: 33–49 (.402)
- Place: Division: 4th (Northwest); Conference: 11th (Western)
- Playoff finish: Did not qualify
- Stats at Basketball Reference

Local media
- Television: CSN Northwest; KGW
- Radio: KEX

The 2012–13 Portland Trail Blazers season was the 43rd season of the franchise in the National Basketball Association (NBA). The off-season saw the team draft a pair of first-round draft picks, future All-Star Damian Lillard was taken sixth overall and Meyers Leonard was taken 11th overall. Despite the team finishing in 11th place in the Western Conference with a mediocre 33–49 record including a 13-game losing streak to finish, Lillard enjoyed a stellar rookie season, winning Rookie of the Year honors for his efforts.

The Trail Blazers would not miss the playoffs again until 2022.

== Key dates ==
- June 28: The 2012 NBA draft took place at Prudential Center in Newark, New Jersey.
- July 1: Free agency started and players were allowed to negotiate contracts with new or their old teams.
- July 11: Ten-day moratorium ended; players were allowed to sign contracts with new or their old teams and teams were allowed to resume making trades.

== Draft ==
Round	Pick	Player	Position	Nationality	School
1	6	Damian Lillard	PG	United States	Weber State
1	11	Meyers Leonard	C	United States	Illinois
2	40	Will Barton	SG	United States	Memphis
2	41	Tyshawn Taylor (traded to Brooklyn)	PG	United States	Kansas

== Roster ==
2012–13 Portland Trail Blazers roster
Players

Pos.	No.	Player	Height	Weight	DOB	From
F/C	12	LaMarcus Aldridge	6 ft 11 in (2.11 m)	240 lb (109 kg)	1985–07–19	Texas
F	8	Luke Babbitt	6 ft 9 in (2.06 m)	225 lb (102 kg)	1989-06-20	Nevada
G	5	Will Barton	6 ft 5 in (1.96 m)	170 lb (77 kg)	1991–01–06	Memphis
G/F	88	Nicolas Batum	6 ft 8 in (2.03 m)	200 lb (91 kg)	1988–12–14	France
F	18	Víctor Claver	6 ft 9 in (2.06 m)	224 lb (102 kg)	1988–08–30	Spain
F/C	19	Joel Freeland	6 ft 10 in (2.08 m)	225 lb (102 kg)	1987–02–07	United Kingdom
F/C	21	J. J. Hickson	6 ft 9 in (2.06 m)	242 lb (110 kg)	1988–09–04	NC State
F/C	1	Jared Jeffries	6 ft 11 in (2.11 m)	240 lb (109 kg)	1981–11–25	Indiana
C	11	Meyers Leonard	7 ft 1 in (2.16 m)	245 lb (111 kg)	1992–02–27	Illinois
G	0	Damian Lillard	6 ft 3 in (1.91 m)	195 lb (88 kg)	1990–07–15	Weber State
G/F	2	Wesley Matthews	6 ft 5 in (1.96 m)	220 lb (100 kg)	1986–10–14	Marquette
G	6	Eric Maynor	6 ft 3 in (1.91 m)	175 lb (79 kg)	1987–06–11	VCU
G/F	3	Sasha Pavlović	6 ft 7 in (2.01 m)	235 lb (107 kg)	1983–11–15	Montenegro
G	4	Nolan Smith	6 ft 2 in (1.88 m)	185 lb (84 kg)	1988–07–25	Duke
G	9	Elliot Williams	6 ft 5 in (1.96 m)	180 lb (82 kg)	1989–06–20	Memphis

Coaches
Head coach
- Terry Stotts
Assistant(s)
- Kaleb Canales
- Kim Hughes
- Dale Osbourne
- Jay Triano
- David Vanterpool

Legend
- (DP) Unsigned draft pick
- (FA) Free agent
- (S) Suspended
- (DL) On assignment to D-League affiliate
- Injured

Roster
Updated: 2012–09–01

== Pre-season ==
2012 pre-season game log
Pre-season: 3–4 (home: 2–1; road: 1–3)

Game	Date	Team	Score	High points	High rebounds	High assists	Location Attendance	Record
1	October 10	@ L. A. Lakers	W 93–75	LaMarcus Aldridge, Damian Lillard (14)	LaMarcus Aldridge (8)	Damian Lillard (7)	Citizens Business Bank Arena; 10,500	1–0
2	October 12	@ Phoenix	L 93–104	Damian Lillard (15)	LaMarcus Aldridge (10)	Damian Lillard (5)	US Airways Center; 10,698	1–1
3	October 15	@ Sacramento	L 100–117	Damian Lillard (20)	LaMarcus Aldridge, J. J. Hickson (7)	Nicolas Batum (5)	Power Balance Pavilion; 9,328	1–2
4	October 17	Denver	W 97–80	Wesley Matthews (19)	Joel Freeland (8)	Nolan Smith (8)	Rose Garden; 17,856	2–2
5	October 19	Golden State	L 97–101	LaMarcus Aldridge (18)	Meyers Leonard (6)	Damian Lillard (7)	Rose Garden; 19,109	2–3
6	October 22	Utah	W 120–114	Nicolas Batum (27)	J. J. Hickson (8)	Damian Lillard (8)	Rose Garden; 19,150	3–3
7	October 25	@ Utah	L 91–97	Wesley Matthews (24)	LaMarcus Aldridge (11)	Damian Lillard (5)	EnergySolutions Arena; 18,247	3–4

2012–13 season schedule

== Regular season ==
=== Standings ===
Northwest Division	W	L	PCT	GB	Home	Road	Div	GP
c-Oklahoma City Thunder	60	22	.732	–	34–7	26–15	10–6	82
x-Denver Nuggets	57	25	.695	3	38–3	19–22	11–5	82
Utah Jazz	43	39	.524	17	30–11	13–28	9–7	82
Portland Trail Blazers	33	49	.402	27	22–19	11–30	6–10	82
Minnesota Timberwolves	31	51	.378	29	20–21	11–30	4–12	82

Western Conference
#	Team	W	L	PCT	GB	GP
1	c-Oklahoma City Thunder *	60	22	.732	–	82
2	y-San Antonio Spurs *	58	24	.707	2.0	82
3	x-Denver Nuggets *	57	25	.695	3.0	82
4	y-Los Angeles Clippers	56	26	.683	4.0	82
5	x-Memphis Grizzlies	56	26	.683	4.0	82
6	x-Golden State Warriors	47	35	.573	13.0	82
7	x-Los Angeles Lakers	45	37	.549	15.0	82
8	x-Houston Rockets	45	37	.549	15.0	82
9	Utah Jazz	43	39	.524	17.0	82
10	Dallas Mavericks	41	41	.500	19.0	82
11	Portland Trail Blazers	33	49	.402	27.0	82
12	Minnesota Timberwolves	31	51	.378	29.0	82
13	Sacramento Kings	28	54	.341	32.0	82
14	New Orleans Hornets	27	55	.329	33.0	82
15	Phoenix Suns	25	57	.305	35.0	82

=== Game log ===
2012–13 game log
Total: 33–49 (Home: 22–19; Road: 11–30)
October: 1–0 (home: 1–0; road: 0–0)

Game	Date	Team	Score	High points	High rebounds	High assists	Location Attendance	Record
1	October 31	L. A. Lakers	W 116–106	Nicolas Batum (26)	J. J. Hickson (10)	Damian Lillard (11)	Rose Garden; 20,401	1–0

November : 5–10 (home: 3–3; road: 2–7)

Game	Date	Team	Score	High points	High rebounds	High assists	Location Attendance	Record
2	November 2	@ Oklahoma City	L 92–106	LaMarcus Aldridge (22)	LaMarcus Aldridge (15)	Damian Lillard (7)	Chesapeake Energy Arena; 18,203	1–1
3	November 3	@ Houston	W 95–85	LaMarcus Aldridge (27)	J. J. Hickson (12)	Damian Lillard (9)	Toyota Center; 18,140	2–1
4	November 5	@ Dallas	L 91–114	Aldridge & Matthews (20)	J. J. Hickson (11)	Damian Lillard (5)	American Airlines Center; 19,521	2–2
5	November 8	L. A. Clippers	L 90–103	Nicolas Batum (23)	Nicolas Batum (9)	Batum & Aldridge (5)	Rose Garden; 20,425	2–3
6	November 10	San Antonio	L 109–112	Nicolas Batum (35)	J. J. Hickson (14)	LaMarcus Aldridge (7)	Rose Garden; 20,447	2–4
7	November 12	Atlanta	L 87–95	Batum & Hickson (19)	J. J. Hickson (18)	LaMarcus Aldridge (8)	Rose Garden; 19,095	2–5
8	November 13	@ Sacramento	W 103–86	Damian Lillard (22)	J. J. Hickson (13)	Damian Lillard (9)	Sleep Train Arena; 10,153	3–5
9	November 16	Houston	W 119–117	Nicolas Batum (35)	Meyers Leonard (8)	Lillard & Matthews (5)	Rose Garden; 20,382	4–5
10	November 18	Chicago	W 102–94	Batum & Matthews (21)	LaMarcus Aldridge (13)	Ronnie Price (5)	Rose Garden; 20,242	5–5
11	November 21	@ Phoenix	L 87–114	Damian Lillard (24)	LaMarcus Aldridge (7)	Nicolas Batum (4)	US Airways Center; 14,263	5–6
12	November 23	Minnesota	W 103–95	Wesley Matthews (30)	J. J. Hickson (13)	Damian Lillard (8)	Rose Garden; 20,555	6-6
13	November 25	@ Brooklyn	L 85–98	Wesley Matthews (20)	J. J. Hickson (10)	Damian Lillard (7)	Barclays Center; 16,542	6–7
14	November 26	@ Detroit	L 101–108	LaMarcus Aldridge (32)	Batum & Aldridge (10)	Damian Lillard (7)	The Palace of Auburn Hills; 10,212	6–8
15	November 28	@ Washington	L 82–84	Batum & Lillard (20)	J. J. Hickson (19)	Damian Lillard (5)	Verizon Center; 14,114	6–9
16	November 30	@ Boston	L 78–96	LaMarcus Aldridge (23)	LaMarcus Aldridge (8)	Will Barton (4)	TD Garden; 18,624	6–10

December : 9–4 (home: 7–1; road: 2–3)

Game	Date	Team	Score	High points	High rebounds	High assists	Location Attendance	Record
17	December 1	@ Cleveland	W 118–117	Damian Lillard (24)	LaMarcus Aldridge (9)	Damian Lillard (11)	Quicken Loans Arena; 16,624	7–10
18	December 3	@ Charlotte	W 118–112	LaMarcus Aldridge (25)	Batum & Aldridge (13)	Damian Lillard (9)	Time Warner Cable Arena; 12,640	8–10
19	December 5	@ Indiana	L 92–99	Damian Lillard (23)	J. J. Hickson (12)	Damian Lillard (6)	Bankers Life Fieldhouse; 11,569	8–11
20	December 8	Sacramento	L 80–99	LaMarcus Aldridge (17)	J. J. Hickson (15)	Damian Lillard (9)	Rose Garden; 19,454	8–12
21	December 10	Toronto	W 92–74	LaMarcus Aldridge (30)	LaMarcus Aldridge (12)	Damian Lillard (6)	Rose Garden; 16,863	9–12
22	December 13	San Antonio	W 98–90	Damian Lillard (29)	J. J. Hickson (12)	Nicolas Batum (8)	Rose Garden; 19,118	10–12
23	December 16	New Orleans	W 95–94	J. J. Hickson (24)	J. J. Hickson (16)	Nicolas Batum (10)	Rose Garden; 18,772	11–12
24	December 20	Denver	W 101–93	Nicolas Batum (22)	J. J. Hickson (18)	Damian Lillard (10)	Rose Garden; 19,982	12-12
25	December 22	Phoenix	W 96–93	Damian Lillard (25)	J. J. Hickson (15)	Nicolas Batum (8)	Rose Garden; 19,746	13–12
26	December 23	@ Sacramento	L 96–108	LaMarcus Aldridge (22)	Hickson & Aldridge (11)	Nicolas Batum (8)	Sleep Train Arena; 13,244	13-13
27	December 26	Sacramento	W 109–91	LaMarcus Aldridge (28)	J. J. Hickson (14)	Damian Lillard (11)	Rose Garden; 20,545	14–13
28	December 28	@ L. A. Lakers	L 87–104	LaMarcus Aldridge (26)	J. J. Hickson (8)	Nicolas Batum (8)	Staples Center; 18,997	14-14
29	December 29	Philadelphia	W 89–85	Nicolas Batum (22)	J. J. Hickson (13)	Nicolas Batum (8)	Rose Garden; 20,569	15–14

January : 8–8 (home: 5–3; road: 3–5)

Game	Date	Team	Score	High points	High rebounds	High assists	Location Attendance	Record
30	January 1	@ New York	W 105–100	Nicolas Batum (26)	LaMarcus Aldridge (14)	Batum & Lillard (6)	Madison Square Garden; 19,033	16–14
31	January 2	@ Toronto	L 79–102	Damian Lillard (18)	LaMarcus Aldridge (10)	Damian Lillard (7)	Air Canada Centre; 18,117	16–15
32	January 4	@ Memphis	W 86–84	Wesley Matthews (21)	LaMarcus Aldridge (12)	Damian Lillard (8)	FedExForum; 15,823	17–15
33	January 5	@ Minnesota	W 102–97	Batum & Matthews (26)	J. J. Hickson (11)	Aldridge & Lillard (6)	Target Center; 16,220	18–15
34	January 7	Orlando	W 125–119	LaMarcus Aldridge (27)	J. J. Hickson (15)	Batum & Lillard (10)	Rose Garden; 19,560	19–15
35	January 10	Miami	W 92–90	Nicolas Batum (28)	LaMarcus Aldridge (15)	Damian Lillard (8)	Rose Garden; 20,536	20–15
36	January 11	@ Golden State	L 97–103	Damian Lillard (37)	J. J. Hickson (12)	LaMarcus Aldridge (5)	Oracle Arena; 19,596	20–16
37	January 13	Oklahoma City	L 83–87	LaMarcus Aldridge (33)	LaMarcus Aldridge (11)	Damian Lillard (9)	Rose Garden; 20,423	20–17
38	January 15	@ Denver	L 111–115	LaMarcus Aldridge (28)	J. J. Hickson (13)	Nicolas Batum (7)	Pepsi Center; 15,521	20–18
39	January 16	Cleveland	L 88–93	Nicolas Batum (23)	Nicolas Batum (12)	Damian Lillard (7)	Rose Garden; 18,880	20–19
40	January 19	Milwaukee	L 104–110	Damian Lillard (26)	LaMarcus Aldridge (14)	Damian Lillard (10)	Rose Garden; 20,487	20-20
41	January 21	Washington	L 95–98	Damian Lillard (18)	LaMarcus Aldridge (12)	Nicolas Batum (11)	Rose Garden; 17,366	20–21
42	January 23	Indiana	W 100–80	LaMarcus Aldridge (27)	J. J. Hickson (13)	Batum & Lillard (8)	Rose Garden; 18,934	21-21
43	January 26	L. A. Clippers	W 101–100	Batum & Lillard (20)	Nicolas Batum (10)	Nicolas Batum (12)	Rose Garden; 20,672	22–21
44	January 27	@ L. A. Clippers	L 83–96	LaMarcus Aldridge (21)	LaMarcus Aldridge (11)	Batum & Matthews (8)	Staples Center; 19,060	22-22
45	January 29	Dallas	W 106–104	LaMarcus Aldridge (29)	J. J. Hickson (15)	Damian Lillard (8)	Rose Garden; 18,888	23–22

February : 3–9 (home: 2–2; road: 1–7)

Game	Date	Team	Score	High points	High rebounds	High assists	Location Attendance	Record
46	February 1	@ Utah	L 77–86	Damian Lillard (26)	LaMarcus Aldridge (10)	Damian Lillard (5)	EnergySolutions Arena; 19,512	23-23
47	February 2	Utah	W 105–99	Damian Lillard (23)	Aldridge & Hickson (11)	Nicolas Batum (9)	Rose Garden; 20,376	24–23
48	February 4	@ Minnesota	W 100–98	LaMarcus Aldridge (25)	LaMarcus Aldridge (13)	Damian Lillard (6)	Target Center; 13,446	25–23
49	February 6	@ Dallas	L 99–105	LaMarcus Aldridge (27)	Aldridge & Hickson (10)	Batum & Lillard (6)	American Airlines Center; 19,746	25–24
50	February 8	@ Houston	L 103–118	LaMarcus Aldridge (31)	LaMarcus Aldridge (11)	Damian Lillard (6)	Toyota Center; 15,655	25-25
51	February 10	@ Orlando	L 102–110	LaMarcus Aldridge (25)	Nicolas Batum (8)	Damian Lillard (12)	Amway Center; 17,966	25–26
52	February 12	@ Miami	L 104–117	Damian Lillard (33)	Wesley Matthews (6)	Nicolas Batum (4)	American Airlines Arena; 20,032	25–27
53	February 13	@ New Orleans	L 63–99	Damian Lillard (12)	Víctor Claver (6)	Nicolas Batum (6)	New Orleans Arena; 11,656	25–28
All-Star Break
54	February 19	Phoenix	L 98–102	J. J. Hickson (25)	J. J. Hickson (16)	Damian Lillard (7)	Rose Garden; 20,499	25–29
55	February 22	@ L. A. Lakers	L 107–111	Nicolas Batum & J. J. Hickson (22)	J. J. Hickson (11)	Wesley Matthews (8)	Staples Center; 18,997	25–30
56	February 24	Boston	W 92–86	Wesley Matthews (24)	J. J. Hickson (11)	Damian Lillard (6)	Rose Garden; 20,484	26–30
57	February 27	Denver	L 109–111	Damian Lillard (26)	J. J. Hickson (14)	Nicolas Batum (9)	Rose Garden; 20,077	26–31

March : 7–9 (home: 4–3; road: 3–6)

Game	Date	Team	Score	High points	High rebounds	High assists	Location Attendance	Record
58	March 2	Minnesota	W 109–94	Damian Lillard (24)	J. J. Hickson (16)	Eric Maynor (12)	Rose Garden; 20,390	27–31
59	March 4	Charlotte	W 122–105	LaMarcus Aldridge (23)	LaMarcus Aldridge (14)	Damian Lillard (7)	Rose Garden; 18,330	28–31
60	March 6	@ Memphis	L 85–91	Damian Lillard (20)	J. J. Hickson (13)	LaMarcus Aldridge (6)	FedExForum; 16,214	28–32
61	March 8	@ San Antonio	W 136–106	Damian Lillard (35)	J. J. Hickson (11)	Damian Lillard (9)	AT&T Center; 18,581	29–32
62	March 10	@ New Orleans	L 96–98	Wesley Matthews (24)	J. J. Hickson (14)	Damian Lillard (8)	New Orleans Arena; 15,036	29–33
63	March 12	Memphis	L 97–102	LaMarcus Aldridge (28)	Nicolas Batum (10)	Damian Lillard (7)	Rose Garden; 18,754	29–34
64	March 14	New York	W 105–90	Damian Lillard (26)	J. J. Hickson (16)	Damian Lillard (10)	Rose Garden; 20,636	30–34
65	March 16	Detroit	W 112–101	LaMarcus Aldridge (31)	J. J. Hickson (15)	Damian Lillard (7)	Rose Garden; 20,161	31–34
66	March 18	@ Philadelphia	L 100–101	LaMarcus Aldridge (32)	LaMarcus Aldridge (14)	Damian Lillard (7)	Wells Fargo Center; 15,623	31–35
67	March 19	@ Milwaukee	L 95–102	Wesley Matthews (24)	LaMarcus Aldridge (15)	Damian Lillard (11)	BMO Harris Bradley Center; 14,397	31–36
68	March 21	@ Chicago	W 99–89	LaMarcus Aldridge (28)	J. J. Hickson (21)	Damian Lillard (7)	United Center; 21,946	32–36
69	March 22	@ Atlanta	W 104–93	Wesley Matthews (28)	LaMarcus Aldridge (13)	Nicolas Batum (7)	Philips Arena; 16,348	33–36
70	March 24	@ Oklahoma City	L 83–103	Damian Lillard (19)	LaMarcus Aldridge (12)	Nicolas Batum (8)	Chesapeake Energy Arena; 18,203	33–37
71	March 27	Brooklyn	L 93–111	LaMarcus Aldridge (24)	Meyers Leonard (9)	Nicolas Batum (6)	Rose Garden; 20,127	33–38
72	March 29	Utah	L 95–105	Damian Lillard (24)	J. J. Hickson (14)	Damian Lillard (7)	Rose Garden; 19,527	33–39
73	March 30	@ Golden State	L 98–125	Meyers Leonard (22)	J. J. Hickson (10)	Nicolas Batum (9)	Oracle Arena; 19,596	33–40

April : 0–9 (home: 0–6; road: 0–3)

Game	Date	Team	Score	High points	High rebounds	High assists	Location Attendance	Record
74	April 1	@ Utah	L 102–112	Wesley Matthews (23)	J. J. Hickson (7)	Eric Maynor (8)	EnergySolutions Arena; 18,336	33–41
75	April 3	Memphis	L 76–94	J. J. Hickson (17)	J. J. Hickson (9)	Eric Maynor (10)	Rose Garden; 19,275	33–42
76	April 5	Houston	L 98–116	LaMarcus Aldridge (32)	LaMarcus Aldridge (13)	Damian Lillard (7)	Rose Garden; 20,400	33–43
77	April 7	Dallas	L 91–96	Will Barton (22)	Will Barton (13)	Maynor & Barton (6)	Rose Garden; 20,228	33–44
78	April 10	L. A. Lakers	L 106–113	Damian Lillard (38)	LaMarcus Aldridge (16)	Damian Lillard (9)	Rose Garden; 20,598	33–45
79	April 12	Oklahoma City	L 90–106	Will Barton (18)	J. J. Hickson (7)	Damian Lillard (8)	Rose Garden; 20,577	33–46
80	April 14	@ Denver	L 109–118	Damian Lillard (30)	Hickson & Barton (9)	Hickson & Lillard (6)	Pepsi Center; 19,155	33–47
81	April 16	@ L. A. Clippers	L 77–93	Will Barton (17)	Hickson, Barton & Freeland (6)	Damian Lillard (8)	Staples Center; 19,183	33–48
82	April 17	Golden State	L 88–99	LaMarcus Aldridge (30)	LaMarcus Aldridge (21)	Eric Maynor (6)	Rose Garden; 20,261	33–49

2012–13 season schedule

== Awards and records ==
On December 5, 2012, Damian Lillard was named Western Conference Rookie of the Month for November, making him the third rookie in Blazers history to earn the honor, following Arvydas Sabonis (1994) and Brandon Roy (2007). When asked about the honor, Lillard stated "I’m happy that I can get it, but I think all that it says is that I played good for one month. My mind has been focused on being consistent for the whole season, so ... it's a big deal to win the award, but it's not a big deal for the season. I’ll be happy about it and then it’ll be gone. It's a new month already."

== Injuries ==
Reserve guard Elliot Williams tore his left Achilles tendon during a team workout on September 9. He was out for the season.

== Player statistics ==
Legend
GP	Games played	GS	Games started	MPG	Minutes per game
FG%	Field-goal percentage	3P%	3-point field-goal percentage	FT%	Free-throw percentage
RPG	Rebounds per game	APG	Assists per game	SPG	Steals per game
BPG	Blocks per game	PPG	Points per game

=== Regular season ===
Portland Trail Blazers statistics
Player	GP	GS	MPG	FG%	3P%	FT%	RPG	APG	SPG	BPG	PPG
Damian Lillard	82	82	38.6	.429	.368	.844	3.1	6.5	.9	.2	19.0
JJ Hickson	80	80	29.0	.562	.000	.679	10.4	1.1	.6	.6	12.7
LaMarcus Aldridge	74	74	37.7	.484	.143	.810	9.1	2.6	.8	1.2	21.1
Nicolas Batum	73	73	38.5	.423	.372	.848	5.6	4.9	1.2	1.1	14.3
Will Barton	73	5	12.2	.382	.138	.769	2.0	.8	.5	.1	4.0
Wesley Matthews	69	69	34.8	.436	.398	.797	2.8	2.5	1.3	.3	14.8
Meyers Leonard	69	9	17.5	.545	.429	.809	3.7	.5	.2	.6	5.5
Luke Babbitt	62	0	11.8	.368	.348	.769	2.2	.5	.2	.1	3.9
Joel Freeland	51	1	9.4	.408		.667	2.3	.3	.3	.2	2.6
Víctor Claver	49	16	16.6	.392	.287	.467	2.4	.9	.5	.2	3.8
Nolan Smith	40	0	7.2	.368	.214	.714	.7	.9	.2	.0	2.8
Aleksandar Pavlović	39	1	13.5	.353	.300	.167	1.4	.8	.6	.1	2.6
Ronnie Price	39	0	13.1	.325	.256	.708	1.1	1.9	.7	.1	2.7
Jared Jeffries	38	0	9.2	.296	.000	.522	1.6	.4	.2	.2	1.2
Eric Maynor^{†}	27	0	21.2	.422	.380	.683	1.0	4.0	.4	.0	6.9

- ^{†} Denotes player spent time with another team in the season. Stats reflect time with the Trail Blazers only.

== Transactions ==
=== Overview ===
Players added

Via draft

- Damian Lillard
- Meyers Leonard
- Will Barton

Via free agency

- Víctor Claver
- Joel Freeland
- Demonte Harper ^{[a]}
- Justin Holiday ^{[a]}
- Coby Karl ^{[a]}
- Dallas Lauderdale ^{[a]}
- Adam Morrison ^{[a]}
- Ronnie Price

Via trade

- Dan Gadzuric ^{[a]}
- Jared Jeffries
- Sasha Pavlović
Players lost

Via trade

- Raymond Felton
- Kurt Thomas

Via free agency

- Jamal Crawford
- Jonny Flynn
- Joel Przybilla
- Craig Smith
- Hasheem Thabeet

- ^{a} Waived during the pre-season.

=== Trades ===
June 28, 2012 (draft day)	To Portland Trail Blazers Cash considerations	To Brooklyn Nets Draft rights to Tyshawn Taylor
July 16, 2012	To Portland Trail Blazers Jared Jeffries (sign and trade); Dan Gadzuric; Draft rights to Kostas Papanikolaou; Draft rights to Georgios Printezis; Future second-round pick	To New York Knicks Raymond Felton (sign and trade); Kurt Thomas
July 20, 2012 (three-team trade)	To Portland Trail Blazers Sasha Pavlović (sign and trade from Boston); Two 2013 second-round picks (from Boston); Cash considerations (from Boston)	To Houston Rockets Draft rights to Jon Diebler

=== Free agents ===
Additions
Player	Date signed	Former team
J. J. Hickson	July 13	Portland Trail Blazers (re-signed)
Nicolas Batum	July 18	Portland Trail Blazers (re-signed)
Ronnie Price	July 18	Phoenix Suns

Subtractions
Player	Date signed	New team
Jamal Crawford	July 11	Los Angeles Clippers
Hasheem Thabeet	July 11	Oklahoma City Thunder
Joel Przybilla	August 9	Milwaukee Bucks
Craig Smith	August 11	Hapoel Jerusalem (Israel)
Jonny Flynn	October 1	Detroit Pistons
