= 2012–13 San Antonio Spurs season =

- Conference champions
- Division champions
- Head coach: Gregg Popovich
- President: Gregg Popovich
- General manager: R. C. Buford
- Owner: Peter Holt
- Arena: AT&T Center

Results
- Record: 58–24 (.707)
- Place: Division: 1st (Southwest); Conference: 2nd (Western)
- Playoff finish: NBA Finals (lost to Heat 3–4)
- Stats at Basketball Reference

Local media
- Television: FS Southwest; KENS; KMYS
- Radio: WOAI; KCOR (in Spanish)

The 2012–13 San Antonio Spurs season was the 46th season of the franchise, 40th in San Antonio and 37th in the National Basketball Association (NBA). The Spurs finished the regular season with a 58–24 record as the 2nd seed in the Western Conference.

In the playoffs, the Spurs swept the Los Angeles Lakers in the first round in four games, defeated the Golden State Warriors in the semifinals in six games, and swept the Memphis Grizzlies in the conference finals in four games, advancing to the NBA Finals for the fifth time in franchise history and the first time since 2007. In the end they would come short of winning a fifth title, losing to the Miami Heat in a tough seven-game series, marking their first defeat in the NBA Finals.

== Key dates ==
- June 28, 2012: The 2012 NBA draft takes place at Prudential Center in Newark, New Jersey.
- November 21, 2012: The Spurs signed James Anderson.
- December 20, 2012: The Spurs waived James Anderson.
- January 22, 2013: The Spurs signed Aron Baynes.
- March 14, 2013: With a 92–91 defeat of rival Dallas Mavericks the Spurs extended their NBA record to 14 consecutive 50+ win seasons, also clinching a playoff spot, their 16th straight postseason appearance, their 33rd overall.
- April 6, 2013: With a 99–97 defeat of the Atlanta Hawks, the Spurs won the Southwest Division for the sixth time (the fourth in five years), the 19th overall division title in 37 years of play in the NBA.
- April 12, 2013: The Spurs waived Stephen Jackson.
- April 17, 2013: The Spurs signed Tracy McGrady.

== Draft picks ==
Round	Pick	Player	Position	Nationality	School/club team
2	59	Marcus Denmon	Guard	American	Missouri

== Roster ==
2012–13 San Antonio Spurs roster
Players

Pos.	No.	Player	Height	Weight	DOB	From
C	16	Aron Baynes	6 ft 10 in (2.08 m)	260 lb (118 kg)	1986-12-09	Washington State
PF	45	DeJuan Blair	6 ft 7 in (2.01 m)	270 lb (122 kg)	1989-04-22	Pittsburgh
PF	15	Matt Bonner	6 ft 10 in (2.08 m)	235 lb (107 kg)	1980-04-05	Florida
SG	25	Nando de Colo	6 ft 5 in (1.96 m)	200 lb (91 kg)	1987-06-23	France
PF	33	Boris Diaw	6 ft 8 in (2.03 m)	235 lb (107 kg)	1982-04-16	France
C	21	Tim Duncan	6 ft 11 in (2.11 m)	255 lb (116 kg)	1976-04-25	Wake Forest
SG	20	Manu Ginóbili	6 ft 6 in (1.98 m)	205 lb (93 kg)	1977-07-28	Argentina
SG	4	Danny Green	6 ft 6 in (1.98 m)	210 lb (95 kg)	1987-06-22	North Carolina
PG	5	Cory Joseph	6 ft 3 in (1.91 m)	185 lb (84 kg)	1991-08-20	Texas
SF	2	Kawhi Leonard	6 ft 7 in (2.01 m)	225 lb (102 kg)	1991-06-29	San Diego State
SF	1	Tracy McGrady	6 ft 8 in (2.03 m)	225 lb (102 kg)	1979-05-24	Mt. Zion HS (NC)
PG	8	Patty Mills	6 ft 0 in (1.83 m)	185 lb (84 kg)	1988-08-11	Saint Mary's
SG	14	Gary Neal	6 ft 4 in (1.93 m)	210 lb (95 kg)	1984-10-03	Towson
PG	9	Tony Parker	6 ft 2 in (1.88 m)	185 lb (84 kg)	1982-05-17	France
PF	22	Tiago Splitter	6 ft 11 in (2.11 m)	240 lb (109 kg)	1985-01-01	Brazil

Coaches
Head coach
- Gregg Popovich
Assistant(s)
- Mike Budenholzer
- Brett Brown
- Chip Engelland
- Chad Forcier
- Ime Udoka

Legend
- (DP) Unsigned draft pick
- (FA) Free agent
- (S) Suspended
- Injured

Roster
Updated: April 16, 2013

== Regular season ==
=== Standings ===
Southwest Division	W	L	PCT	GB	Home	Road	Div	GP
y-San Antonio Spurs	58	24	.707	–	35–6	23–18	12–4	82
x-Memphis Grizzlies	56	26	.683	2	32–9	24–17	10–6	82
x-Houston Rockets	45	37	.549	13	29–12	16–25	6–10	82
Dallas Mavericks	41	41	.500	17	24–17	17–24	7–9	82
New Orleans Hornets	27	55	.329	31	16–25	11–30	5–11	82

Western Conference
#	Team	W	L	PCT	GB	GP
1	c-Oklahoma City Thunder *	60	22	.732	–	82
2	y-San Antonio Spurs *	58	24	.707	2.0	82
3	x-Denver Nuggets *	57	25	.695	3.0	82
4	y-Los Angeles Clippers	56	26	.683	4.0	82
5	x-Memphis Grizzlies	56	26	.683	4.0	82
6	x-Golden State Warriors	47	35	.573	13.0	82
7	x-Los Angeles Lakers	45	37	.549	15.0	82
8	x-Houston Rockets	45	37	.549	15.0	82
9	Utah Jazz	43	39	.524	17.0	82
10	Dallas Mavericks	41	41	.500	19.0	82
11	Portland Trail Blazers	33	49	.402	27.0	82
12	Minnesota Timberwolves	31	51	.378	29.0	82
13	Sacramento Kings	28	54	.341	32.0	82
14	New Orleans Hornets	27	55	.329	33.0	82
15	Phoenix Suns	25	57	.305	35.0	82

=== Game log ===
2012–13 game log
Total: 58–24 (home: 35–6; road: 23–18)
October: 1–0 (home: 0–0; road: 1–0)

Game	Date	Team	Score	High points	High rebounds	High assists	Location Attendance	Record
1	October 31	@ New Orleans	W 99–95	Tim Duncan (24)	Tim Duncan (11)	Boris Diaw, Tony Parker (6)	New Orleans Arena; 15,358	1–0

November : 12–4 (home: 4–2; road: 8–2)

Game	Date	Team	Score	High points	High rebounds	High assists	Location Attendance	Record
2	November 1	Oklahoma City	W 86–84	Tim Duncan (20)	Tim Duncan (8)	Tony Parker (11)	AT&T Center; 18,581	2–0
3	November 3	Utah	W 110–100	Tony Parker (24)	Tim Duncan (11)	Tony Parker (10)	AT&T Center; 18,581	3–0
4	November 5	Indiana	W 101–79	Gary Neal (17)	Tim Duncan, DeJuan Blair (11)	Manu Ginóbili, Tony Parker (7)	AT&T Center; 17,158	4–0
5	November 7	@ L. A. Clippers	L 84–106	Danny Green (12)	DeJuan Blair (7)	Tony Parker (6)	Staples Center; 19,060	4–1
6	November 9	@ Sacramento	W 97–86	Tim Duncan (23)	Tim Duncan (12)	Tony Parker (6)	Sleep Train Arena; 13,505	5–1
7	November 10	@ Portland	W 112–109	Gary Neal (27)	Tim Duncan (9)	Patrick Mills, Manu Ginóbili (4)	Rose Garden; 20,447	6–1
8	November 13	@ L. A. Lakers	W 84–82	Tony Parker (19)	Tim Duncan, Tiago Splitter (9)	Tony Parker (7)	Staples Center; 18,997	7–1
9	November 15	New York	L 100–104	Tony Parker (19)	Tim Duncan (14)	Tony Parker (12)	AT&T Center; 18,581	7–2
10	November 17	Denver	W 126–100	Manu Ginóbili (20)	Stephen Jackson (9)	Tony Parker (6)	AT&T Center; 18,581	8–2
11	November 19	L. A. Clippers	L 87–92	Tim Duncan (20)	Tim Duncan (14)	Tony Parker (6)	AT&T Center; 17,920	8–3
12	November 21	@ Boston	W 112–100	Tony Parker (26)	Tim Duncan (15)	Tony Parker (6)	TD Garden; 18,624	9–3
13	November 23	@ Indiana	W 104–97	Tony Parker (33)	Tim Duncan (17)	Tony Parker (10)	Bankers Life Fieldhouse; 17,082	10–3
14	November 25	@ Toronto	W 111–106 (2OT)	Tony Parker (32)	Danny Green (9)	Tim Duncan (6)	Air Canada Centre; 19,800	11–3
15	November 26	@ Washington	W 118–92	Boris Diaw (16)	Tiago Splitter (12)	Tiago Splitter (7)	Verizon Center; 13,879	12–3
16	November 28	@ Orlando	W 110–89	Manu Ginóbili (20)	Boris Diaw (7)	Tony Parker (8)	Amway Center; 17,271	13–3
17	November 29	@ Miami	L 100–105	Gary Neal (20)	Matt Bonner (10)	Gary Neal (7)	American Airlines Arena; 19,703	13–4

December : 12–4 (home: 9–0; road: 3–4)

Game	Date	Team	Score	High points	High rebounds	High assists	Location Attendance	Record
18	December 1	Memphis	W 99–95 (OT)	Tony Parker (30)	Tim Duncan (15)	Tony Parker, Manu Ginóbili (6)	AT&T Center; 18,581	14–4
19	December 5	Milwaukee	W 110–99	Gary Neal, Tony Parker (22)	Matt Bonner (12)	Tony Parker (10)	AT&T Center; 18,349	15–4
20	December 7	Houston	W 114–92	Tony Parker (17)	Tim Duncan (12)	Tony Parker (7)	AT&T Center; 18,581	16–4
21	December 8	@ Charlotte	W 132–102	Danny Green (23)	Nando de Colo (8)	Tony Parker (9)	Time Warner Cable Arena; 17,321	17–4
22	December 10	@ Houston	W 134–126 (OT)	Gary Neal (29)	Tim Duncan (13)	Tony Parker (12)	Toyota Center; 13,959	18–4
23	December 12	@ Utah	L 96–99	Tony Parker, Tim Duncan (22)	Tim Duncan (21)	Tony Parker (7)	EnergySolutions Arena; 18,710	18–5
24	December 13	@ Portland	L 90–98	Tony Parker (21)	Tiago Splitter (7)	Manu Ginóbili (7)	Rose Garden; 19,118	18–6
25	December 15	Boston	W 103–88	Tony Parker (22)	Tim Duncan (12)	Tony Parker (8)	AT&T Center; 18,759	19–6
26	December 17	@ Oklahoma City	L 93–107	Tony Parker, Nando de Colo (14)	DeJuan Blair (6)	Tony Parker (7)	Chesapeake Energy Arena; 18,203	19–7
27	December 18	@ Denver	L 106–112	Tim Duncan (31)	Tim Duncan (18)	Tim Duncan, Manu Ginóbili (6)	Pepsi Center; 17,092	19–8
28	December 21	New Orleans	W 99–94	Tony Parker (25)	Tim Duncan (10)	Manu Ginóbili (7)	AT&T Center; 17,943	20–8
29	December 23	Dallas	W 129–91	Danny Green (25)	Tiago Splitter (7)	Manu Ginóbili (9)	AT&T Center; 18,581	21–8
30	December 26	Toronto	W 100–80	Tim Duncan (15)	Kawhi Leonard (10)	Tony Parker (7)	AT&T Center; 18,581	22–8
31	December 28	Houston	W 122–116	Tony Parker (31)	Tiago Splitter (6)	Tony Parker (10)	AT&T Center; 18,581	23–8
32	December 30	@ Dallas	W 111–86	Tony Parker (21)	Tim Duncan (10)	Tony Parker (9)	American Airlines Center; 19,928	24–8
33	December 31	Brooklyn	W 104–73	Tony Parker (20)	Boris Diaw (6)	Tony Parker (6)	AT&T Center; 18,581	25–8

January : 12–3 (home: 8–0; road: 4–3)

Game	Date	Team	Score	High points	High rebounds	High assists	Location Attendance	Record
34	January 2	@ Milwaukee	W 117–110	Tim Duncan (28)	Tim Duncan (13)	Tony Parker (11)	BMO Harris Bradley Center; 15,084	26–8
35	January 3	@ New York	L 83–100	Gary Neal (12)	Tim Duncan (6)	Tony Parker (6)	Madison Square Garden; 19,033	26–9
36	January 5	Philadelphia	W 109–86	Tony Parker (20)	Tiago Splitter (10)	Tony Parker (5)	AT&T Center; 18,581	27–9
37	January 7	@ New Orleans	L 88–95	Manu Ginóbili (21)	Tim Duncan (8)	Manu Ginóbili (4)	New Orleans Arena; 11,599	27–10
38	January 9	L. A. Lakers	W 108–105	Tony Parker (24)	Tiago Splitter (14)	Tony Parker (6)	AT&T Center; 18,581	28–10
39	January 11	@ Memphis	L 98–101 (OT)	Tony Parker (30)	Tim Duncan (11)	Tony Parker, Manu Ginóbili (5)	FedExForum; 17,685	28–11
40	January 13	Minnesota	W 106–88	Tony Parker (20)	Tim Duncan (9)	Tony Parker (6)	AT&T Center; 18,144	29–11
41	January 16	Memphis	W 103–82	Tim Duncan (19)	Tiago Splitter (9)	Tony Parker (11)	AT&T Center; 18,581	30–11
42	January 18	Golden State	W 95–88	Tony Parker (25)	Tim Duncan (10)	Tony Parker (8)	AT&T Center; 18,581	31–11
43	January 19	@ Atlanta	W 98–93	Tony Parker (23)	DeJuan Blair, Tiago Splitter (7)	Tony Parker (17)	Philips Arena; 18,255	32–11
44	January 21	@ Philadelphia	W 90–85	Tim Duncan (24)	Tim Duncan (17)	Tony Parker (8)	Wells Fargo Center; 15,346	33–11
45	January 23	New Orleans	W 106–102	Tiago Splitter (25)	Tiago Splitter, Danny Green (7)	Tony Parker (13)	AT&T Center; 17,511	34–11
46	January 25	@ Dallas	W 113–107	Tony Parker (23)	Tiago Splitter (12)	Tony Parker (10)	American Airlines Center; 19,884	35–11
47	January 26	Phoenix	W 108–99	Tony Parker (31)	Tiago Splitter (8)	Tony Parker (7)	AT&T Center; 18,581	36–11
48	January 30	Charlotte	W 102–78	Tony Parker (22)	Aron Baynes (9)	Tony Parker (7)	AT&T Center; 18,581	37–11

February : 8–3 (home: 1–1; road: 7–2)

Game	Date	Team	Score	High points	High rebounds	High assists	Location Attendance	Record
49	February 2	Washington	W 96–86	Tony Parker (19)	Kawhi Leonard (11)	Tony Parker (12)	AT&T Center; 18,581	38–11
50	February 6	@ Minnesota	W 104–94	Tony Parker (31)	Kawhi Leonard (10)	Tony Parker (8)	Target Center; 15,224	39–11
51	February 8	@ Detroit	L 109–119	Tony Parker (31)	DeJuan Blair (10)	Tony Parker (8)	The Palace of Auburn Hills; 17,266	39–12
52	February 10	@ Brooklyn	W 111–86	Tony Parker (29)	Tiago Splitter (9)	Tony Parker (11)	Barclays Center; 17,014	40–12
53	February 11	@ Chicago	W 103–89	Kawhi Leonard (26)	Danny Green (6)	Nando de Colo (7)	United Center; 21,955	41–12
54	February 13	@ Cleveland	W 96–95	Tony Parker (24)	Kawhi Leonard (10)	Tony Parker (7)	Quicken Loans Arena; 12,162	42–12
All-Star Break
55	February 19	@ Sacramento	W 108–102	Tony Parker (30)	Tim Duncan (14)	Tony Parker (11)	Power Balance Pavilion; 14,940	43–12
56	February 21	@ L. A. Clippers	W 116–90	Tony Parker (31)	Tim Duncan (5)	Tony Parker, Danny Green (7)	Staples Center; 19,343	44–12
57	February 22	@ Golden State	L 101–107 (OT)	Danny Green (20)	Tim Duncan (13)	Tim Duncan, Kawhi Leonard, Tony Parker (3)	Oracle Arena; 19,596	44–13
58	February 24	@ Phoenix	W 97–87	Kawhi Leonard & Patty Mills (16)	Kawhi Leonard (9)	Manu Ginóbili (6)	US Airways Center; 14,923	45–13
59	February 27	Phoenix	L 101–105	Tony Parker (22)	Tim Duncan (11)	Tony Parker (8)	AT&T Center; 17,573	45–14

March : 10–4 (home: 10–2; road: 0–2)

Game	Date	Team	Score	High points	High rebounds	High assists	Location Attendance	Record
60	March 1	Sacramento	W 130–102	DeJuan Blair (16)	Tiago Splitter (11)	Manu Ginóbili (15)	AT&T Center; 18,581	46–14
61	March 3	Detroit	W 114–75	Manu Ginóbili (17)	Tim Duncan (11)	Tim Duncan, Stephen Jackson (6)	AT&T Center; 18,581	47–14
62	March 6	Chicago	W 101–83	Tim Duncan, Manu Ginóbili (18)	Tim Duncan, Tiago Splitter (10)	Manu Ginóbili (9)	AT&T Center; 18,581	48–14
63	March 8	Portland	L 106–136	Tim Duncan (18)	Tim Duncan (8)	Tiago Splitter, Cory Joseph, Stephen Jackson, Manu Ginóbili, Tim Duncan, Boris Diaw (3)	AT&T Center; 18,581	48–15
64	March 11	Oklahoma City	W 105–93	Tiago Splitter (21)	Tiago Splitter (10)	Gary Neal (6)	AT&T Center; 18,581	49–15
65	March 12	@ Minnesota	L 83–107	Cory Joseph (15)	Tiago Splitter (11)	Patrick Mills (6)	Target Center; 14,219	49–16
66	March 14	Dallas	W 92–91	Tim Duncan (28)	Tim Duncan (19)	Manu Ginóbili (9)	AT&T Center; 18,581	50–16
67	March 16	Cleveland	W 119–113	Tim Duncan (30)	Kawhi Leonard (13)	Manu Ginóbili (10)	AT&T Center; 18,581	51–16
68	March 20	Golden State	W 104–93	Tim Duncan (25)	Tim Duncan (13)	Manu Ginóbili (7)	AT&T Center; 17,751	52–16
69	March 22	Utah	W 104–97	Tony Parker (22)	Tim Duncan (16)	Tony Parker, Tim Duncan (5)	AT&T Center; 18,581	53–16
70	March 24	@ Houston	L 95–96	Tony Parker (23)	Tim Duncan (7)	Tony Parker (7)	Toyota Center; 18,245	53–17
71	March 27	Denver	W 100–99	Tim Duncan (23)	Tim Duncan (14)	Tony Parker (11)	AT&T Center; 18,581	54–17
72	March 29	L. A. Clippers	W 104–102	Tim Duncan (34)	Tim Duncan (11)	Tony Parker (8)	AT&T Center; 18,581	55–17
73	March 31	Miami	L 86–88	Tim Duncan, Kawhi Leonard (17)	Tim Duncan (12)	Tony Parker (8)	AT&T Center; 18,581	55–18

April : 3–6 (home: 3–1; road: 0–5)

Game	Date	Team	Score	High points	High rebounds	High assists	Location Attendance	Record
74	April 1	@ Memphis	L 90–92	Tony Parker (25)	Tiago Splitter (11)	Tony Parker, DeJuan Blair (4)	FedExForum; 16,642	55–19
75	April 3	Orlando	W 98–84	Danny Green (20)	Tiago Splitter (9)	Nando de Colo (6)	AT&T Center; 18,581	56–19
76	April 4	@ Oklahoma City	L 88–100	Tim Duncan, Kawhi Leonard (24)	Kawhi Leonard (14)	Kawhi Leonard (6)	Chesapeake Energy Arena; 18,203	56–20
77	April 6	Atlanta	W 99–97	Tim Duncan (31)	Tim Duncan (14)	Kawhi Leonard (4)	AT&T Center; 18,581	57–20
78	April 10	@ Denver	L 86–96	Tim Duncan, Gary Neal (17)	Kawhi Leonard (11)	Tiago Splitter, Nando De Colo, Cory Joseph, Patty Mills (4)	Pepsi Center; 16,651	57–21
79	April 12	Sacramento	W 108–101	Tony Parker (22)	Tiago Splitter (12)	Tony Parker (10)	AT&T Center; 18,581	58–21
80	April 14	@ L. A. Lakers	L 86–91	Tim Duncan (23)	Tim Duncan, Tiago Splitter (10)	Tony Parker (8)	Staples Center; 18,997	58–22
81	April 15	@ Golden State	L 106–116	Gary Neal (25)	Tiago Splitter (7)	Nando de Colo (9)	Oracle Arena; 19,596	58–23
82	April 17	Minnesota	L 95–108	Tim Duncan, Gary Neal (17)	Tim Duncan (14)	Tony Parker (8)	AT&T Center; 18,581	58–24

2012–13 season schedule

== Playoffs ==
=== Game log ===
2013 playoff game log
First Round: 4–0 (home: 2–0; road: 2–0)

Game	Date	Team	Score	High points	High rebounds	High assists	Location Attendance	Series
1	April 21	L. A. Lakers	W 91–79	Tony Parker, Manu Ginóbili (18)	Kawhi Leonard (11)	Tony Parker (8)	AT&T Center; 18,581	1–0
2	April 24	L. A. Lakers	W 102–91	Tony Parker (28)	Kawhi Leonard (7)	Tony Parker, Manu Ginóbili (7)	AT&T Center; 18,581	2–0
3	April 26	@ L. A. Lakers	W 120–89	Tim Duncan (26)	Tim Duncan (9)	Tony Parker (7)	Staples Center; 18,997	3–0
4	April 28	@ L. A. Lakers	W 103–82	Tony Parker (23)	Kawhi Leonard (7)	Manu Ginóbili, Cory Joseph (6)	Staples Center; 18,997	4–0

Conference Semifinals: 4–2 (home: 2–1; road: 2–1)

Game	Date	Team	Score	High points	High rebounds	High assists	Location Attendance	Series
1	May 6	Golden State	W 129–127 (2OT)	Tony Parker (28)	Tim Duncan (11)	Manu Ginóbili (11)	AT&T Center; 18,581	1–0
2	May 8	Golden State	L 91–100	Tim Duncan (23)	Kawhi Leonard (12)	Manu Ginóbili (4)	AT&T Center; 18,581	1–1
3	May 10	@ Golden State	W 102–92	Tony Parker (32)	Tim Duncan (10)	Tony Parker (5)	Oracle Arena; 19,596	2–1
4	May 12	@ Golden State	L 87–97 (OT)	Manu Ginóbili (21)	Tim Duncan (15)	Tony Parker, Tiago Splitter, Manu Ginóbili, Boris Diaw (3)	Oracle Arena; 19,596	2–2
5	May 14	Golden State	W 109–91	Tony Parker (25)	Tim Duncan (1)	Tony Parker (10)	AT&T Center; 18,581	3–2
6	May 16	@ Golden State	W 94–82	Tim Duncan (19)	Kawhi Leonard (10)	Manu Ginóbili (11)	Oracle Arena; 19,596	4–2

Conference Finals: 4–0 (home: 2–0; road: 2–0)

Game	Date	Team	Score	High points	High rebounds	High assists	Location Attendance	Series
1	May 19	Memphis	W 105–83	Tony Parker (20)	Tim Duncan (10)	Tony Parker (9)	AT&T Center; 18,581	1–0
2	May 21	Memphis	W 93–89 (OT)	Tim Duncan (17)	Tim Duncan, Kawhi Leonard (9)	Tony Parker (18)	AT&T Center; 18,581	2–0
3	May 25	@ Memphis	W 104–93 (OT)	Tony Parker (26)	Kawhi Leonard (11)	Tim Duncan, Tony Parker, Manu Ginóbili (5)	FedExForum; 18,119	3–0
4	May 27	@ Memphis	W 93–86	Tony Parker (37)	Tim Duncan (8)	Manu Ginóbili, Tony Parker (6)	FedExForum; 18,119	4–0

NBA Finals: 3–4 (home: 2–1; road: 1–3)

Game	Date	Team	Score	High points	High rebounds	High assists	Location Attendance	Series
1	June 6	@ Miami	W 92–88	Tony Parker (21)	Tim Duncan (14)	Tony Parker (6)	American Airlines Arena; 19,775	1–0
2	June 9	@ Miami	L 84–103	Danny Green (17)	Kawhi Leonard (14)	Tony Parker (5)	American Airlines Arena; 19,900	1–1
3	June 11	Miami	W 113–77	Danny Green (27)	Tim Duncan (14)	Tony Parker (8)	AT&T Center; 18,581	2–1
4	June 13	Miami	L 93–109	Tim Duncan (20)	Kawhi Leonard (9)	Tony Parker (7)	AT&T Center; 18,581	2–2
5	June 16	Miami	W 114–104	Tony Parker (26)	Tim Duncan (12)	Manu Ginóbili (10)	AT&T Center; 18,581	3–2
6	June 18	@ Miami	L 100–103 (OT)	Tim Duncan (30)	Tim Duncan (17)	Tony Parker (8)	American Airlines Arena; 19,900	3–3
7	June 20	@ Miami	L 88–95	Tim Duncan (24)	Kawhi Leonard (16)	Manu Ginóbili (5)	American Airlines Arena; 19,900	3–4

2013 playoff schedule

== Player statistics ==
=== Regular season ===
Player	POS	GP	GS	MP	REB	AST	STL	BLK	PTS	MPG	RPG	APG	SPG	BPG	PPG
Tiago Splitter	PF	81	58	1,997	515	130	63	64	838	24.7	6.4	1.6	.8	.8	10.3
Danny Green	SG	80	80	2,201	244	141	92	54	838	27.5	3.1	1.8	1.2	.7	10.5
Boris Diaw	PF	75	20	1,709	254	180	52	27	435	22.8	3.4	2.4	.7	.4	5.8
Nando de Colo	SG	72	6	920	138	138	41	6	276	12.8	1.9	1.9	.6	.1	3.8
Tim Duncan	C	69	69	2,078	686	184	50	183	1,227	30.1	9.9	2.7	.7	2.7	17.8
Gary Neal	SG	68	17	1,484	143	129	30	2	645	21.8	2.1	1.9	.4	.0	9.5
Matt Bonner	PF	68	4	909	129	36	17	19	288	13.4	1.9	.5	.3	.3	4.2
Tony Parker	PG	66	66	2,174	198	499	54	6	1,341	32.9	3.0	7.6	.8	.1	20.3
DeJuan Blair	PF	61	16	851	230	45	37	10	328	14.0	3.8	.7	.6	.2	5.4
Manu Ginóbili	SG	60	0	1,393	201	274	80	13	705	23.2	3.4	4.6	1.3	.2	11.8
Kawhi Leonard	SF	58	57	1,810	346	93	97	32	689	31.2	6.0	1.6	1.7	.6	11.9
Patty Mills	PG	58	2	656	50	62	26	4	294	11.3	.9	1.1	.4	.1	5.1
Stephen Jackson	SF	55	6	1,075	155	80	37	14	341	19.5	2.8	1.5	.7	.3	6.2
Cory Joseph	PG	28	9	388	52	53	15	4	126	13.9	1.9	1.9	.5	.1	4.5
Aron Baynes	C	16	0	141	32	5	1	6	43	8.8	2.0	.3	.1	.4	2.7
James Anderson^{†}	SF	10	0	94	14	9	3	2	34	9.4	1.4	.9	.3	.2	3.4

- ^{†} Denotes player spent time with another team in the season. Stats reflect time with the Spurs only.

=== Playoffs ===
Player	POS	GP	GS	MP	REB	AST	STL	BLK	PTS	MPG	RPG	APG	SPG	BPG	PPG
Kawhi Leonard	SF	21	21	775	190	22	37	11	284	36.9	9.0	1.0	1.8	.5	13.5
Tony Parker	PG	21	21	765	68	146	24	3	432	36.4	3.2	7.0	1.1	.1	20.6
Tim Duncan	C	21	21	735	214	40	18	34	381	35.0	10.2	1.9	.9	1.6	18.1
Danny Green	SG	21	21	669	87	32	22	23	233	31.9	4.1	1.5	1.0	1.1	11.1
Manu Ginóbili	SG	21	3	560	78	105	24	6	242	26.7	3.7	5.0	1.1	.3	11.5
Gary Neal	SG	21	0	390	45	15	3	1	143	18.6	2.1	.7	.1	.0	6.8
Matt Bonner	PF	20	1	267	39	6	5	5	81	13.4	2.0	.3	.3	.3	4.1
Cory Joseph	PG	20	0	192	31	24	6	2	59	9.6	1.6	1.2	.3	.1	3.0
Tiago Splitter	PF	19	15	388	58	23	15	14	116	20.4	3.1	1.2	.8	.7	6.1
Boris Diaw	PF	16	1	273	40	28	4	3	65	17.1	2.5	1.8	.3	.2	4.1
DeJuan Blair	PF	12	0	76	24	7	5	1	47	6.3	2.0	.6	.4	.1	3.9
Patty Mills	PG	9	0	31	3	2	0	0	12	3.4	.3	.2	.0	.0	1.3
Tracy McGrady	SF	6	0	31	8	7	2	3	0	5.2	1.3	1.2	.3	.5	.0
Nando de Colo	SG	5	0	14	4	2	0	0	4	2.8	.8	.4	.0	.0	.8
Aron Baynes	C	4	1	23	5	0	0	0	8	5.8	1.3	.0	.0	.0	2.0
