= 2012–13 Golden State Warriors season =

NBA professional basketball team season

- Head coach: Mark Jackson
- General manager: Bob Myers
- Owners: Peter Guber; Joe Lacob
- Arena: Oracle Arena

Results
- Record: 47–35 (.573)
- Place: Division: 2nd (Pacific); Conference: 6th (Western)
- Playoff finish: Conference Semifinals (lost to Spurs 2–4)
- Stats at Basketball Reference

The 2012–13 Golden State Warriors season was the 67th season of the franchise in the National Basketball Association (NBA), and the 51st anniversary of their time in the San Francisco Bay Area.

The team finished with a record of 47–35 (.573), and finished the season as the number-six seed, clinching a playoff berth for the first time since 2007. The team had a winning record for the first time since 2008. This season included the first playoff series victory for the first time since 2007, as most of the squad experienced postseason play for the first time. The season began a streak of 7 straight winning records.

The Warriors had four draft picks in the 2012 NBA draft, a decisive draft year that was vital for a potential future for the team. The picks included Harrison Barnes with the 7th pick, Festus Ezeli with the 30th pick, Draymond Green with the 35th pick, and Ognjen Kuzmic with the 52nd pick. With Brandon Rush and his season-ending injury, Barnes was placed in the starting lineup and became crucial in bringing the team back to the playoffs for the first time in six years. Another injury mid-season from Andrew Bogut also affected the team with the lack of a true center for a majority of the season.

The season was marked by significant highlights, such as Stephen Curry surpassing the existing record for the most three-point field goals made in a single season; Curry's 272 three-pointers beat the 269 shot by Ray Allen in the 2005–06 season. During the 2014-15 season in which what would turn out to be the Warriors' breakout season, Curry and Klay Thompson would ascend to preeminence in the NBA. Ultimately establishing themselves as one of the most prolific duos in NBA history for their exceptional three-point shooting skills, earning the nickname "Splash Brothers" for their remarkable proficiency in shooting from beyond the three-point line in record-breaking numbers. A seven-game Eastern Conference road trip featured a 6–1 record, including a close win against the defending champion Miami Heat. David Lee was named as an All-Star in the 2013 NBA All-Star Game in Houston, and thus became the first Warrior since Latrell Sprewell in 1997 to be named an All-Star. Lee also led the league in double-doubles. The Warriors returned to the playoffs for the first time in six years; for most players the first time experiencing postseason play except Bogut. After a 4–2 series win against the number-three seed Denver Nuggets in the first round, the Warriors won a playoff series for the first time since 2007. In the conference semi-final, the Warriors faced the number two-seed San Antonio Spurs. Curry scored 44 points in a double-overtime loss in Game 1, but the team pulled off a 100-91 Game 2 win, which was the first Warriors victory, playoff or regular season, in San Antonio since February 1997 and did not occur again until April 10, 2016 (when the same Warriors' team also defeated the same Spurs' team in their only home loss of the 2016 season which tied the 1985–86 Boston Celtics home record for most wins at home during the regular season at 40–1), to tie the series at one game apiece. However, despite the willingness to fight, the inexperience and youth of the Warrior squad resulted in defeat as the Warriors lost to the eventual Western Conference Champion Spurs in six games.

== Draft ==
Round	Pick	Player	Position	Nationality	School / club team
1	7	Harrison Barnes	SF	United States	North Carolina (So.)
1	30	Festus Ezeli	C	Nigeria	Vanderbilt (Sr.)
2	35	Draymond Green	PF	United States	Michigan State (Sr.)
2	52	Ognjen Kuzmić	C	Serbia	Clinicas Rincón (Spain)

== Pre-season ==
2012 pre-season game log
Pre-season: 6–2 (home: 3–0; road: 3–2)

Game	Date	Team	Score	High points	High rebounds	High assists	Location Attendance	Record
1	October 7	@ L. A. Lakers	W 110–83	David Lee (19)	David Lee (7)	Charles Jenkins (7)	Save Mart Center; 12,015	1–0
2	October 8	Utah	W 83–80	David Lee (19)	David Lee (14)	Stephen Curry (6)	Oracle Arena; 14,571	2–0
3	October 11	Maccabi Haifa	W 108–100	Carl Landry (24)	Ezeli, Landry (8)	Stephen Curry (10)	Oracle Arena; 8,237	3–0
4	October 15	@ Denver	L 98–104	Stephen Curry (25)	Klay Thompson (6)	Jarrett Jack (5)	Pepsi Center; 11,621	3–1
5	October 17	@ Sacramento	W 98–88	Stephen Curry (19)	David Lee (14)	Jarrett Jack (8)	Power Balance Pavilion; 10,708	4–1
6	October 19	@ Portland	W 101–97	David Lee (24)	David Lee (8)	Jarrett Jack (9)	Rose Garden; 19,109	5–1
7	October 22	@ L. A. Clippers	L 71–88	Jarrett Jack (14)	David Lee (9)	Jarrett Jack (5)	Staples Center; 14,143	5–2
8	October 23	Phoenix	W 107–92	Barnes, Lee (16)	Harrison Barnes (7)	Jarrett Jack (9)	Oracle Arena; 17,427	6–2

2012–13 season schedule

== Regular season ==
=== Standings ===
==== Division ====
Pacific Division	W	L	PCT	GB	Home	Road	Div	GP
y-Los Angeles Clippers	56	26	.683	–	32–9	24–17	11–5	82
x-Golden State Warriors	47	35	.573	9	28–13	19–22	9–7	82
x-Los Angeles Lakers	45	37	.549	11	29–12	16–25	8–8	82
Sacramento Kings	28	54	.341	28	20–21	8–33	7–9	82
Phoenix Suns	25	57	.305	31	17–24	8–33	5–11	82

==== Conference ====
Western Conference
#	Team	W	L	PCT	GB	GP
1	c-Oklahoma City Thunder *	60	22	.732	–	82
2	y-San Antonio Spurs *	58	24	.707	2.0	82
3	x-Denver Nuggets *	57	25	.695	3.0	82
4	y-Los Angeles Clippers	56	26	.683	4.0	82
5	x-Memphis Grizzlies	56	26	.683	4.0	82
6	x-Golden State Warriors	47	35	.573	13.0	82
7	x-Los Angeles Lakers	45	37	.549	15.0	82
8	x-Houston Rockets	45	37	.549	15.0	82
9	Utah Jazz	43	39	.524	17.0	82
10	Dallas Mavericks	41	41	.500	19.0	82
11	Portland Trail Blazers	33	49	.402	27.0	82
12	Minnesota Timberwolves	31	51	.378	29.0	82
13	Sacramento Kings	28	54	.341	32.0	82
14	New Orleans Hornets	27	55	.329	33.0	82
15	Phoenix Suns	25	57	.305	35.0	82

=== Game log ===
2012–13 game log
Total: 47–35 (home: 28–13; road: 19–22)
October: 1–0 (home: 0–0; road: 1–0)

Game	Date	Team	Score	High points	High rebounds	High assists	Location Attendance	Record
1	October 31	@ Phoenix	W 87–85	Carl Landry (17)	David Lee (9)	Jarrett Jack (7)	US Airways Center; 15,678	1–0

November : 8–6 (home: 5–2; road: 3–4)

Game	Date	Team	Score	High points	High rebounds	High assists	Location Attendance	Record
2	November 2	Memphis	L 94–104	Stephen Curry (26)	David Lee (7)	Stephen Curry (7)	Oracle Arena; 19,596	1–1
3	November 3	@ L. A. Clippers	W 114–110	Curry, Landry (23)	David Lee (12)	Jarrett Jack (7)	Staples Center; 19,060	2–1
4	November 5	@ Sacramento	L 92–94	Klay Thompson (22)	Klay Thompson (7)	Stephen Curry (8)	Power Balance Pavilion; 17,317	2–2
5	November 7	Cleveland	W 106–96	David Lee (22)	David Lee (14)	Stephen Curry, Lee (6)	Oracle Arena; 18,124	3–2
6	November 9	@ L. A. Lakers	L 77–101	Stephen Curry (18)	David Lee (12)	Stephen Curry (5)	Staples Center; 18,997	3–3
7	November 10	Denver	L 101–107 (2OT)	Klay Thompson (23)	Landry, Lee (9)	Jack, Lee (5)	Oracle Arena; 19,596	3–4
8	November 14	Atlanta	W 92–88	Harrison Barnes (19)	Harrison Barnes (13)	Stephen Curry (7)	Oracle Arena; 18,107	4–4
9	November 16	@ Minnesota	W 106–98	Barnes, Lee (18)	David Lee (13)	Stephen Curry (6)	Target Center; 16,013	5–4
10	November 18	@ Oklahoma City	L 109–119	Stephen Curry (22)	David Lee (10)	Stephen Curry (6)	Chesapeake Energy Arena; 18,203	5–5
11	November 19	@ Dallas	W 105–101 (OT)	Stephen Curry (31)	David Lee (19)	Stephen Curry (9)	American Airlines Center; 20,034	6–5
12	November 21	Brooklyn	W 102–93	Stephen Curry (25)	David Lee (13)	Jarrett Jack (9)	Oracle Arena; 18,374	7–5
13	November 23	@ Denver	L 91–102	David Lee (21)	Ezeli, Lee (10)	Jack, Landry (4)	Pepsi Center; 18,523	7–6
14	November 24	Minnesota	W 96–85	Klay Thompson (24)	Harrison Barnes (11)	Stephen Curry (6)	Oracle Arena; 19,084	8–6
15	November 29	Denver	W 106–105	David Lee (31)	Lee, Thompson (9)	Stephen Curry (10)	Oracle Arena; 17,627	9–6

December : 12–4 (home: 5–2; road: 7–2)

Game	Date	Team	Score	High points	High rebounds	High assists	Location Attendance	Record
16	December 1	Indiana	W 103–92	Klay Thompson (22)	David Lee (12)	Stephen Curry (11)	Oracle Arena; 18,623	10–6
17	December 3	Orlando	L 94–102	Stephen Curry (25)	Carl Landry (10)	Stephen Curry (11)	Oracle Arena; 18,117	10–7
18	December 5	@ Detroit	W 104–97	Klay Thompson (27)	David Lee (11)	Stephen Curry (10)	The Palace of Auburn Hills; 11,128	11–7
19	December 7	@ Brooklyn	W 109–102	David Lee (30)	David Lee (15)	Jarrett Jack (8)	Barclays Center; 17,732	12–7
20	December 8	@ Washington	W 101–97	David Lee (24)	David Lee (17)	Curry, Thompson (5)	Verizon Center; 15,176	13–7
21	December 10	@ Charlotte	W 104–96	Stephen Curry (27)	David Lee (11)	Stephen Curry (7)	Time Warner Cable Arena; 13,169	14–7
22	December 12	@ Miami	W 97–95	Klay Thompson (27)	David Lee (13)	Stephen Curry (7)	American Airlines Arena; 19,600	15–7
23	December 14	@ Orlando	L 85–99	Stephen Curry (25)	David Lee (15)	Jarrett Jack (6)	Amway Center; 17,040	15–8
24	December 15	@ Atlanta	W 115–93	David Lee (20)	David Lee (11)	Stephen Curry (11)	Philips Arena; 15,145	16–8
25	December 18	New Orleans	W 103–96	David Lee (26)	David Lee (9)	Jarrett Jack (10)	Oracle Arena; 19,596	17–8
26	December 19	@ Sacramento	L 127–131	Stephen Curry (32)	David Lee (8)	Lee, Thompson (5)	Sleep Train Arena; 12,885	17–9
27	December 21	Charlotte	W 115–100	Stephen Curry (27)	David Lee (11)	David Lee (11)	Oracle Arena; 19,596	18–9
28	December 22	L. A. Lakers	L 115–118 (OT)	Jarrett Jack (29)	David Lee (11)	Jarrett Jack (11)	Oracle Arena; 19,596	18–10
29	December 26	@ Utah	W 94–83	Stephen Curry (23)	Andris Biedriņš (12)	Stephen Curry (7)	EnergySolutions Arena; 19,404	19–10
30	December 28	Philadelphia	W 96–89	David Lee (25)	David Lee (12)	Curry, Jack (6)	Oracle Arena; 19,596	20–10
31	December 29	Boston	W 101–83	Stephen Curry (22)	Harrison Barnes (8)	Stephen Curry (9)	Oracle Arena; 19,596	21–10

January : 8–7 (home: 5–2; road: 3–5)

Game	Date	Team	Score	High points	High rebounds	High assists	Location Attendance	Record
32	January 2	L. A. Clippers	W 115–94	Stephen Curry (31)	David Lee (13)	Stephen Curry (8)	Oracle Arena; 19,596	22–10
33	January 5	@ L. A. Clippers	L 89–115	Klay Thompson (14)	Draymond Green (8)	Stephen Curry (5)	Staples Center; 19,323	22–11
34	January 9	Memphis	L 87–94	Stephen Curry (24)	David Lee (10)	Klay Thompson (7)	Oracle Arena; 19,596	22–12
35	January 11	Portland	W 103–97	David Lee (24)	David Lee (10)	Stephen Curry (12)	Oracle Arena; 19,596	23–12
36	January 13	@ Denver	L 105–116	Stephen Curry (29)	David Lee (13)	Jarrett Jack (8)	Pepsi Center; 15,861	23–13
37	January 16	Miami	L 75–92	Jarrett Jack (16)	David Lee (11)	Kent Bazemore (5)	Oracle Arena; 19,596	23–14
38	January 18	@ San Antonio	L 88–95	David Lee (22)	Harrison Barnes (8)	Jarrett Jack (10)	AT&T Center; 18,581	23–15
39	January 19	@ New Orleans	W 116–112	Klay Thompson (29)	Carl Landry (11)	Jarrett Jack (12)	New Orleans Arena; 15,472	24–15
40	January 21	L. A. Clippers	W 106–99	Stephen Curry (28)	David Lee (11)	Jarrett Jack (10)	Oracle Arena; 19,596	25–15
41	January 23	Oklahoma City	W 104–99	Stephen Curry (31)	David Lee (12)	Jarrett Jack (8)	Oracle Arena; 19,596	26–15
42	January 25	@ Chicago	L 87–103	David Lee (23)	Klay Thompson (8)	Jarrett Jack (5)	United Center; 21,756	26–16
43	January 26	@ Milwaukee	L 102–109	Stephen Curry (26)	David Lee (15)	Jarrett Jack (10)	BMO Harris Bradley Center; 16,937	26–17
44	January 28	@ Toronto	W 114–102	David Lee (21)	David Lee (12)	David Lee (7)	Air Canada Centre; 15,914	27–17
45	January 29	@ Cleveland	W 108–95	Klay Thompson (32)	David Lee (13)	Jarrett Jack (12)	Quicken Loans Arena; 13,939	28–17
46	January 31	Dallas	W 100–97	Klay Thompson (27)	David Lee (20)	Jack, Lee (9)	Oracle Arena; 19,596	29–17

February : 4–8 (home: 3–1; road: 1–7)

Game	Date	Team	Score	High points	High rebounds	High assists	Location Attendance	Record
47	February 2	Phoenix	W 113–93	Stephen Curry (29)	David Lee (12)	Stephen Curry (8)	Oracle Arena; 19,596	30–17
48	February 5	@ Houston	L 109–140	Jarrett Jack (20)	Andrew Bogut (9)	Stephen Curry (9)	Toyota Center; 15,453	30–18
49	February 6	@ Oklahoma City	L 98–119	Barnes, Thompson (19)	David Lee (11)	Stephen Curry (11)	Chesapeake Energy Arena; 18,203	30–19
50	February 8	@ Memphis	L 93–99	Stephen Curry (32)	Harrison Barnes (7)	Stephen Curry (8)	FedExForum; 16,701	30–20
51	February 9	@ Dallas	L 91–116	Stephen Curry (18)	Draymond Green (9)	Stephen Curry (4)	American Airlines Center; 20,355	30–21
52	February 12	Houston	L 107–116	Stephen Curry (27)	Bogut, Lee (12)	Stephen Curry (6)	Oracle Arena; 19,596	30–22
All-Star Break
53	February 19	@ Utah	L 101–115	Stephen Curry (29)	David Lee (9)	Jarrett Jack (9)	EnergySolutions Arena; 18,231	30–23
54	February 20	Phoenix	W 108–98	Klay Thompson (28)	Bogut, Lee (11)	Stephen Curry (11)	Oracle Arena; 19,596	31–23
55	February 22	San Antonio	W 107–101 (OT)	Jarrett Jack (30)	David Lee (22)	Jarrett Jack (10)	Oracle Arena; 19,596	32–23
56	February 24	@ Minnesota	W 100–99	Jarrett Jack (23)	David Lee (13)	Jarrett Jack (8)	Target Center; 18,033	33–23
57	February 26	@ Indiana	L 97–108	Stephen Curry (38)	David Lee (12)	Curry, Jack (4)	Bankers Life Fieldhouse; 14,426	33–24
58	February 27	@ New York	L 105–109	Stephen Curry (54)	Stephen Curry (6)	Stephen Curry (7)	Madison Square Garden; 19,033	33–25

March : 9–7 (home: 7–4; road: 2–3)

Game	Date	Team	Score	High points	High rebounds	High assists	Location Attendance	Record
59	March 1	@ Boston	L 86–94	Stephen Curry (25)	David Lee (19)	Stephen Curry (6)	TD Garden; 18,624	33–26
60	March 2	@ Philadelphia	L 97–104	Stephen Curry (30)	David Lee (16)	Stephen Curry (8)	Wells Fargo Center; 17,929	33–27
61	March 4	Toronto	W 125–118	David Lee (29)	David Lee (11)	Stephen Curry (12)	Oracle Arena; 19,596	34–27
62	March 6	Sacramento	W 87–83	Klay Thompson (20)	David Lee (10)	Stephen Curry (8)	Oracle Arena; 19,596	35–27
63	March 8	Houston	L 88–94	Stephen Curry (24)	Andrew Bogut (11)	Stephen Curry (8)	Oracle Arena; 19,596	35–28
64	March 9	Milwaukee	L 93–103	Carl Landry (18)	Carl Landry (10)	Stephen Curry (10)	Oracle Arena; 19,596	35–29
65	March 11	New York	W 92–63	Stephen Curry (26)	Andrew Bogut (11)	David Lee (8)	Oracle Arena; 19,596	36–29
66	March 13	Detroit	W 105–97	Stephen Curry (31)	David Lee (15)	Stephen Curry (8)	Oracle Arena; 19,596	37–29
67	March 15	Chicago	L 95–113	Jarrett Jack (20)	David Lee (8)	Stephen Curry (4)	Oracle Arena; 19,596	37–30
68	March 17	@ Houston	W 108–78	Stephen Curry (29)	Andrew Bogut (12)	Stephen Curry (11)	Toyota Center; 18,219	38–30
69	March 18	@ New Orleans	W 93–72	Stephen Curry (30)	David Lee (11)	Bogut, Jack (5)	New Orleans Arena; 11,844	39–30
70	March 20	@ San Antonio	L 93–104	Stephen Curry (24)	David Lee (12)	Jarrett Jack (7)	AT&T Center; 17,751	39–31
71	March 23	Washington	W 101–92	Stephen Curry (35)	David Lee (15)	Stephen Curry (8)	Oracle Arena; 19,596	40–31
72	March 25	L. A. Lakers	W 109–103	Stephen Curry (25)	David Lee (12)	Stephen Curry (10)	Oracle Arena; 19,596	41–31
73	March 27	Sacramento	L 98–105	David Lee (20)	David Lee (10)	Stephen Curry (12)	Oracle Arena; 19,596	41–32
74	March 30	Portland	W 125–98	Stephen Curry (39)	Carl Landry (10)	Curry, Jack (6)	Oracle Arena; 19,596	42–32

April : 5–3 (home: 3–2; road: 2–1)

Game	Date	Team	Score	High points	High rebounds	High assists	Location Attendance	Record
75	April 3	New Orleans	W 98–88	David Lee (23)	David Lee (16)	Stephen Curry (9)	Oracle Arena; 19,596	43–32
76	April 5	@ Phoenix	W 111–107	Klay Thompson (25)	David Lee (14)	Stephen Curry (15)	US Airways Center; 18,422	44–32
77	April 7	Utah	L 90–97	Stephen Curry (22)	David Lee (13)	Jarrett Jack (6)	Oracle Arena; 19,596	44–33
78	April 9	Minnesota	W 105–86	Klay Thompson (30)	Andrew Bogut (14)	Stephen Curry (10)	Oracle Arena; 19,596	45–33
79	April 11	Oklahoma City	L 97–116	Stephen Curry (22)	David Lee (11)	Stephen Curry (7)	Oracle Arena; 19,596	45–34
80	April 12	@ L. A. Lakers	L 116–118	Stephen Curry (47)	David Lee (8)	Stephen Curry (9)	Staples Center; 18,997	45–35
81	April 15	San Antonio	W 116–106	Stephen Curry (35)	Festus Ezeli (13)	Jarrett Jack (12)	Oracle Arena; 19,596	46–35
82	April 17	@ Portland	W 99–88	Klay Thompson (24)	Barnes, Lee (10)	Curry, Jack (5)	Rose Garden; 20,261	47–35

2012–13 season schedule

== Playoffs ==
=== Game log ===
2013 playoff game log
Total: 6–6 (home: 4–2; road: 2–4)
First Round: 4–2 (home: 3–0; road: 1–2)

Game	Date	Team	Score	High points	High rebounds	High assists	Location Attendance	Series
1	April 20	@ Denver	L 95–97	Klay Thompson (28)	David Lee (13)	Jarrett Jack (5)	Pepsi Center; 19,155	0–1
2	April 23	@ Denver	W 131–117	Stephen Curry (30)	Andrew Bogut (8)	Stephen Curry (13)	Pepsi Center; 19,155	1–1
3	April 26	Denver	W 110–108	Stephen Curry (29)	Andrew Bogut (9)	Stephen Curry (11)	Oracle Arena; 19,596	2–1
4	April 28	Denver	W 115–101	Stephen Curry (31)	Draymond Green (6)	Jarrett Jack (9)	Oracle Arena; 19,596	3–1
5	April 30	@ Denver	L 100–107	Harrison Barnes (23)	Harrison Barnes (9)	Stephen Curry (8)	Pepsi Center; 19,155	3–2
6	May 2	Denver	W 92–88	Stephen Curry (22)	Andrew Bogut (21)	Stephen Curry (8)	Oracle Arena; 19,596	4–2

Conference Semifinals: 2–4 (home: 1–2; road: 1–2)

Game	Date	Team	Score	High points	High rebounds	High assists	Location Attendance	Series
1	May 6	@ San Antonio	L 127–129 (2OT)	Stephen Curry (44)	Andrew Bogut (15)	Stephen Curry (11)	AT&T Center; 18,581	0–1
2	May 8	@ San Antonio	W 100–91	Klay Thompson (34)	Klay Thompson (14)	Draymond Green (5)	AT&T Center; 18,581	1–1
3	May 10	San Antonio	L 92–102	Klay Thompson (17)	Andrew Bogut (12)	Stephen Curry (8)	Oracle Arena; 19,596	1–2
4	May 12	San Antonio	W 97–87 (OT)	Harrison Barnes (26)	Andrew Bogut (18)	3 players tied (4)	Oracle Arena; 19,596	2–2
5	May 14	@ San Antonio	L 91–109	Harrison Barnes (25)	Harrison Barnes (7)	Stephen Curry (8)	AT&T Center; 18,581	2–3
6	May 16	San Antonio	L 82–94	Stephen Curry (22)	Bogut, Ezeli (7)	Stephen Curry (6)	Oracle Arena; 19,596	2–4

2013 playoff schedule

== Roster ==
2012–13 Golden State Warriors roster
Players

Pos.	No.	Player	Height	Weight	DOB	From
F	40	Harrison Barnes	6 ft 8 in (2.03 m)	210 lb (95 kg)	1992-05-30	North Carolina
G	20	Kent Bazemore	6 ft 5 in (1.96 m)	201 lb (91 kg)	1989-07-01	Old Dominion
C	15	Andris Biedriņš	7 ft 0 in (2.13 m)	242 lb (110 kg)	1986-04-02	Latvia
C	12	Andrew Bogut	7 ft 0 in (2.13 m)	260 lb (118 kg)	1984-11-28	Utah
G	30	Stephen Curry	6 ft 3 in (1.91 m)	185 lb (84 kg)	1988-03-14	Davidson
C	31	Festus Ezeli	6 ft 11 in (2.11 m)	255 lb (116 kg)	1989-10-21	Vanderbilt
F	23	Draymond Green	6 ft 7 in (2.01 m)	230 lb (104 kg)	1990-03-04	Michigan State
G	2	Jarrett Jack	6 ft 3 in (1.91 m)	197 lb (89 kg)	1983-10-28	Georgia Tech
F	44	Richard Jefferson	6 ft 7 in (2.01 m)	230 lb (104 kg)	1980-06-21	Arizona
F/C	27	Dwayne Jones	6 ft 11 in (2.11 m)	250 lb (113 kg)	1983-06-09	Saint Joseph's
F	7	Carl Landry	6 ft 9 in (2.06 m)	248 lb (112 kg)	1983-09-19	Purdue
F/C	10	David Lee	6 ft 9 in (2.06 m)	240 lb (109 kg)	1983-04-29	Florida
G/F	4	Brandon Rush	6 ft 6 in (1.98 m)	210 lb (95 kg)	1985-07-07	Kansas
G/F	11	Klay Thompson	6 ft 7 in (2.01 m)	205 lb (93 kg)	1990-02-08	Washington State

Coaches
Head coach
- Mark Jackson
Assistant(s)
- Michael Malone
- Pete Myers
- Darren Erman
- Bob Beyer
- Jerry DeGregorio
- Kris Weems (player development)
- Kyle Barbour (strength and conditioning)

Legend
- (DP) Unsigned draft pick
- (FA) Free agent
- (S) Suspended
- (DL) On assignment to D-League affiliate
- Injured

Roster
Updated: April 28, 2013

== Player statistics ==
Legend
GP	Games played	GS	Games started	MPG	Minutes per game
FG%	Field-goal percentage	3P%	3-point field-goal percentage	FT%	Free-throw percentage
RPG	Rebounds per game	APG	Assists per game	SPG	Steals per game
BPG	Blocks per game	PPG	Points per game

=== Regular season ===
Player	GP	GS	MPG	FG%	3P%	FT%	RPG	APG	SPG	BPG	PPG
Klay Thompson	82	82	35.8	.422	.401	.841	3.7	2.2	1.0	.5	16.6
Harrison Barnes	81	81	25.4	.439	.359	.758	4.1	1.2	.6	.2	9.2
Carl Landry	81	2	23.2	.540	.333	.817	6.0	.8	.4	.4	10.8
David Lee	79	79	36.8	.519	.000	.797	11.2	3.5	.8	.3	18.5
Jarrett Jack	79	4	29.7	.452	.404	.843	3.1	5.6	.8	.1	12.9
Draymond Green	79	1	13.4	.327	.209	.818	3.3	.7	.5	.3	2.9
Stephen Curry	78	78	38.2	.451	.453	.900	4.0	6.9	1.6	.2	22.9
Festus Ezeli	78	41	14.4	.438		.531	4.0	.3	.3	.9	2.4
Kent Bazemore	61	0	4.4	.371	.294	.614	.4	.4	.3	.1	2.0
Richard Jefferson	56	1	10.1	.456	.311	.717	1.5	.6	.3	.1	3.1
Andris Biedriņš	53	9	9.3	.476		.308	2.9	.3	.3	.8	.5
Charles Jenkins^{†}	47	0	6.2	.422	.500	.556	.4	.6	.2	.0	1.7
Andrew Bogut	32	32	24.6	.451	1.000	.500	7.7	2.1	.6	1.7	5.8
Jeremy Tyler^{†}	20	0	3.2	.375		.667	.9	.1	.1	.1	1.1
Malcolm Thomas^{†}	5	0	4.2	.000		.750	1.0	.4	.0	.2	.6
Brandon Rush	2	0	12.5	.667	.000	.667	.5	1.0	.0	.0	7.0

=== Playoffs ===
Player	GP	GS	MPG	FG%	3P%	FT%	RPG	APG	SPG	BPG	PPG
Stephen Curry	12	12	41.4	.434	.396	.921	3.8	8.1	1.7	.2	23.4
Klay Thompson	12	12	41.3	.437	.424	.833	4.6	1.8	1.0	.6	15.2
Harrison Barnes	12	12	38.4	.444	.365	.857	6.4	1.3	.6	.4	16.1
Andrew Bogut	12	12	27.3	.582		.348	10.9	1.8	.5	1.5	7.2
Jarrett Jack	12	4	35.5	.506	.292	.896	4.4	4.7	.9	.3	17.2
Carl Landry	12	3	20.5	.520		.731	5.2	1.4	.6	.2	11.8
Festus Ezeli	12	3	11.2	.462		.571	2.5	.2	.3	.6	2.0
Draymond Green	12	1	18.6	.429	.391	.765	4.3	1.6	.5	.8	5.8
Kent Bazemore	9	0	1.8	.125	.000	.000	.6	.2	.1	.0	.2
Richard Jefferson	7	0	5.6	.444	.667	.333	1.0	.1	.1	.1	1.9
David Lee	6	1	10.8	.394		.667	4.7	.8	.5	.2	5.0
Scott Machado	5	0	1.6	.500		.500	.2	.2	.0	.0	.6
Andris Biedriņš	3	0	5.7				2.3	.3	.0	.7	.0
Dwayne Jones	2	0	1.0				.0	.0	.0	.0	.0

- ^{†} Denotes player spent time with another team in the season. Stats reflect time with the Warriors only.

== Transactions ==
=== Trades ===
July 11, 2012	To Golden State Warriors • (United States) Jarrett Jack (from New Orleans)	To New Orleans Pelicans • Draft rights to (Bosnia and Herzegovina) Edin Bavčić (2006 56th pick) (from Philadelphia)	To Philadelphia 76ers • (United States) Daryl Watkins (from New Orleans) • (United States) Dorell Wright (from Golden State)

=== Free agency ===
==== Re-signed ====
Player	Signed
(United States) Brandon Rush	2-year contract worth $8 million
(United States) Stephen Curry	4-year contract extension worth $44 million

==== Additions ====
Player	Signed	Former team
(United States) Kent Bazemore	2-year contract worth $1.2 million	Old Dominion University (Undrafted)
(United States) Carl Landry	2-year contract worth $8 million	New Orleans Pelicans
(United States) Dwayne Jones		Texas Legends (NBA D-League)
(Brazil) Scott Machado		Santa Cruz Warriors (NBA D-League)

==== Subtractions ====
Player	Reason left	New team
(United States) Nate Robinson	1-year contract worth $1.1 million	Chicago Bulls
(United States) Mickell Gladness	—	Miami Heat
(United States) Dominic McGuire	—	Toronto Raptors
(United States) Chris Wright	—	Toronto Raptors
(United States) Keith Benson	—	Atlanta Hawks
(United States) Mikki Moore	—	Philadelphia 76ers
