= 2012–13 Los Angeles Clippers season =

NBA professional basketball team season

- Division champions
- Head coach: Vinny Del Negro
- General manager: Gary Sacks
- Owner: Donald Sterling
- Arena: Staples Center

Results
- Record: 56–26 (.683)
- Place: Division: 1st (Pacific); Conference: 4th (Western)
- Playoff finish: First Round (lost to Grizzlies 2–4)
- Stats at Basketball Reference

Local media
- Television: Fox Sports West and Prime Ticket
- Radio: KFWB

The 2012–13 Los Angeles Clippers season was the 43rd season of the franchise in the National Basketball Association (NBA), their 35th season in Southern California, and their 29th season in Los Angeles. During the offseason, the Clippers signed seven-time all-star Grant Hill and re-acquired Lamar Odom from the Dallas Mavericks. They increased upon their 40–26 record from their previous season, which was affected by the 2011 NBA lockout, to finish 56–26, and they won their first Pacific Division title in franchise history. The title was clinched after defeating the Los Angeles Lakers on April 7, which also completed a season sweep of their crosstown rivals, 4–0. The franchise had not swept the Lakers since 1974–75, when the Clippers were the Buffalo Braves. It was also the first time in 20 years since 1992–93 that the Clippers won the season series against the Lakers. Although this was enough to net them home-court advantage in a playoff series for the first time since 2005–06, they lost their first-round series to the Memphis Grizzlies in six games. Following the season, Hill and Odom both retired and Chauncey Billups re-signed as a free agent with the Detroit Pistons, where he would spend his last season in.

This was the last time a Pacific Division champion got eliminated in the first round until 2023, when the 2022–23 Sacramento Kings lost to the 2022–23 Golden State Warriors in seven games.

== Key dates ==
- June 28, 2012: The 2012 NBA draft takes place at Prudential Center in Newark, New Jersey.
- December 30, 2012: With a 107–96 victory over the Utah Jazz the Clippers complete only the third 16-0 month in NBA history, after the 1971–72 Los Angeles Lakers and the 1995–96 San Antonio Spurs.
- April 3, 2013: With a 126–101 victory over the Phoenix Suns, the Clippers notch the first 50-win season in franchise history.
- April 7, 2013: The Clippers clinch their first division title in franchise history (in Buffalo, San Diego or Los Angeles) with a 109–95 victory over the Lakers. It also guarantees them home-court advantage in the first round for only the second time ever (since the division champions are guaranteed no worse than the fourth seed).

== Draft picks ==
Round	Pick	Player	Position	Nationality	College/Team
2	53	Furkan Aldemir	PF	Turkey	Turkey

== Future draft picks ==
=== Credits ===
2016 second-round draft pick from Brooklyn The L.A. Clippers had the right to swap their own 2016 second-round pick with Brooklyn's 2016 second-round pick provided the Clippers' second-round pick was 31–55. If the Clippers' pick was 56–60, Brooklyn's obligations to the Clippers shall be extinguished. (Brooklyn-L.A. Clippers, 7/11/2012)

=== Debits ===
2013 second-round draft pick to Detroit The L.A. Clippers' own 2013 second-round pick to Detroit (top-55 protected in the 2013 Draft). If the Clippers' own 2013 second-round pick was in the top 55 picks, then the Clippers' obligations to Detroit shall be extinguished. [Detroit – L.A. Clippers, February 16, 2009]

2014 second-round draft pick to San Antonio The L.A. Clippers' own 2014 second-round pick to San Antonio via New Orleans (top-55 protected in the 2014 draft). If the L.A. Clippers' own 2014 second-round pick was in the top 55 picks, then the L.A. Clippers' obligations to San Antonio via New Orleans shall be extinguished. [L.A. Clippers – New Orleans, 1/26/2010 and then New Orleans – San Antonio, October 18, 2010]

2015 second-round draft pick to Houston The L.A. Clippers' own 2015 second-round pick to Houston via Toronto (if pick is 51–55). If the Clippers' own 2015 second-round pick was not among the 51st through 55th picks, then the Clippers' obligations to Houston shall be extinguished. [L.A. Clippers – Toronto, 1/7/2009 and then Houston – Toronto, July 28, 2010]

2015 second-round draft pick to Denver The Clippers' own 2015 second-round pick to Denver (top-55 protected in the 2015 draft). If the Clippers' own 2015 second-round pick was in the top 55 picks, then the Clippers' obligations to Denver shall be extinguished. [Denver – L.A. Clippers, 1/5/2009]

2016 second-round draft pick to New Orleans The Clippers' own 2016 second-round pick to New Orleans (top-55 protected in the 2016 Draft). If the Clippers' own 2016 second-round pick was in the top 55 picks, then the Clippers' obligations to New Orleans shall be extinguished. [L.A. Clippers – New Orleans, 8/12/2009]

== Roster ==
Los Angeles Clippers roster
Players

Pos.	No.	Player	Height	Weight	DOB	From
SF	22	Matt Barnes	6 ft 7 in (2.01 m)	226 lb (103 kg)		UCLA
PG	1	Chauncey Billups	6 ft 3 in (1.91 m)	210 lb (95 kg)		Colorado
PG	12	Eric Bledsoe	6 ft 1 in (1.85 m)	195 lb (88 kg)		Kentucky
SF	5	Caron Butler	6 ft 7 in (2.01 m)	228 lb (103 kg)		Connecticut
SG	11	Jamal Crawford	6 ft 5 in (1.96 m)	200 lb (91 kg)		Michigan
PG	34	Willie Green	6 ft 3 in (1.91 m)	201 lb (91 kg)		Detroit Mercy
PF	32	Blake Griffin	6 ft 10 in (2.08 m)	251 lb (114 kg)		Oklahoma
SF	33	Grant Hill	6 ft 8 in (2.03 m)	225 lb (102 kg)		Duke
C	15	Ryan Hollins	7 ft 0 in (2.13 m)	240 lb (109 kg)		UCLA
C	6	DeAndre Jordan	6 ft 11 in (2.11 m)	265 lb (120 kg)		Texas A&M
SF	7	Lamar Odom	6 ft 10 in (2.08 m)	230 lb (104 kg)		Rhode Island
PG	3	Chris Paul	6 ft 0 in (1.83 m)	175 lb (79 kg)		Wake Forest
SF	35	DaJuan Summers	6 ft 8 in (2.03 m)	240 lb (109 kg)		Georgetown
PF	21	Ronny Turiaf	6 ft 10 in (2.08 m)	249 lb (113 kg)		Gonzaga
PG	2	Maalik Wayns	6 ft 1 in (1.85 m)	195 lb (88 kg)		Villanova

Coaches
Head coach
- Vinny Del Negro (NC State)
Assistant(s)
- Marc Iavaroni (Virginia)
- Dean Demopoulos (West Chester)
- Robert Pack (USC)

Legend
- (DP) Unsigned draft pick
- (FA) Free agent
- (S) Suspended
- Injured

=== Roster notes ===
- Forward Lamar Odom becomes the 18th former Laker to play with the crosstown rival Clippers. This also marks his second tour of duty with the Clippers. He played for the team from 1999 to 2003
- Forward Matt Barnes becomes the 19th former Laker to play with the crosstown rival Clippers. He also makes his second tour of duty with the Clippers. He played for the team in 2004.
- Forward/Center Ronny Turiaf becomes the 20th former Laker to play with the crosstown rival Clippers.

== Pre-season ==
2012 pre-season game log
Pre-season: 5–3 (home: 3–2; road: 2–1)

Game	Date	Team	Score	High points	High rebounds	High assists	Location Attendance	Record
1	October 6	Denver	L 104–106	Eric Bledsoe (25)	Eric Bledsoe (8)	Eric Bledsoe (6)	Mandalay Bay Events Center; 6,748	0–1
2	October 11	Miami	L 80–94	Blake Griffin (19)	Four players (8)	Eric Bledsoe (5)	MasterCard Center; 17,006	0–2
3	October 14	@ Miami	W 99–89	DeAndre Jordan (18)	Blake Griffin (10)	Chris Paul (6)	Mercedes-Benz Arena; 17,292	1–2
4	October 17	Utah	W 96–94	Blake Griffin (23)	DeAndre Jordan (16)	Chris Paul (9)	Staples Center; 14,617	2–2
5	October 20	@ Utah	L 91–99	Matt Barnes (22)	Ronny Turiaf (10)	Chris Paul (8)	EnergySolutions Arena; 18,741	2–3
6	October 22	Golden State	W 88–71	DeAndre Jordan (18)	DeAndre Jordan (12)	Chris Paul (9)	Staples Center; 14,143	3–3
7	October 24	L. A. Lakers	W 97–91	Eric Bledsoe (22)	DeAndre Jordan (7)	Eric Bledsoe (11)	Staples Center; 19,060	4–3
8	October 25	@ Denver	W 106–94	Blake Griffin (25)	Blake Griffin (11)	Chris Paul (12)	Pepsi Center; 13,406	5–3

2012–13 season schedule

== Regular season ==
=== Game log ===
2012–13 game log
Total: 56–26 (home: 32–9; road: 24–17)
October: 1–0 (home: 1–0; road: 0–0)

Game	Date	Team	Score	High points	High rebounds	High assists	Location Attendance	Record
1	October 31	Memphis	W 101–92	Jamal Crawford (29)	Griffin & Jordan (7)	Chris Paul (12)	Staples Center; 19,060	1–0

November : 8–6 (home: 5–3; road: 3–3)

Game	Date	Team	Score	High points	High rebounds	High assists	Location Attendance	Record
2	November 2	@ L. A. Lakers	W 105–95	Jamal Crawford (18)	Blake Griffin (8)	Chris Paul (15)	Staples Center; 18,997	2–0
3	November 3	Golden State	L 110–114	Crawford & Paul (27)	Blake Griffin (11)	Chris Paul (10)	Staples Center; 19,060	2–1
4	November 5	Cleveland	L 101–108	Blake Griffin (20)	Matt Barnes (8)	Chris Paul (9)	Staples Center; 19,060	2–2
5	November 7	San Antonio	W 106–84	Blake Griffin (22)	DeAndre Jordan (11)	Chris Paul (12)	Staples Center; 19,060	3–2
6	November 8	@ Portland	W 103–90	Jamal Crawford (25)	Blake Griffin (10)	Chris Paul (6)	Rose Garden; 20,425	4–2
7	November 11	Atlanta	W 89–76	Blake Griffin (16)	Matt Barnes (7)	Chris Paul (8)	Staples Center; 19,060	5–2
8	November 14	Miami	W 107–100	Jamal Crawford (22)	Blake Griffin (14)	Chris Paul (10)	Staples Center; 19,146	6–2
9	November 17	Chicago	W 101–80	Blake Griffin (26)	Blake Griffin (10)	Chris Paul (10)	Staples Center; 19,060	7–2
10	November 19	@ San Antonio	W 92–87	Chris Paul (19)	Blake Griffin (12)	Chris Paul (8)	AT&T Center; 17,920	8–2
11	November 21	@ Oklahoma City	L 111–117	Blake Griffin (23)	DeAndre Jordan (10)	Chris Paul (9)	Chesapeake Energy Arena; 18,203	8–3
12	November 23	@ Brooklyn	L 76–86	Griffin & Paul (14)	DeAndre Jordan (13)	Chris Paul (9)	Barclays Center; 17,732	8–4
13	November 24	@ Atlanta	L 93–104	Blake Griffin (22)	Blake Griffin (11)	Griffin & Paul (7)	Philips Arena; 16,024	8–5
14	November 26	New Orleans	L 98–105	Caron Butler (33)	Matt Barnes (8)	Chris Paul (8)	Staples Center; 19,060	8–6
15	November 28	Minnesota	W 101–95	Chris Paul (23)	Griffin, Barnes & Jordan (6)	Chris Paul (11)	Staples Center; 19,060	9–6

December : 16–0 (home: 9–0; road: 7–0)

Game	Date	Team	Score	High points	High rebounds	High assists	Location Attendance	Record
16	December 1	Sacramento	W 116–81	Jamal Crawford (17)	Blake Griffin (9)	Jamal Crawford (6)	Staples Center; 19,060	10–6
17	December 3	@ Utah	W 105–104	Blake Griffin (30)	Blake Griffin (11)	Chris Paul (9)	EnergySolutions Arena; 19,067	11–6
18	December 5	Dallas	W 112–90	Jamal Crawford (20)	Blake Griffin (13)	Chris Paul (13)	Staples Center; 19,060	12–6
19	December 8	Phoenix	W 117–99	Blake Griffin (20)	Griffin, Odom & Barnes (8)	Chris Paul (11)	Staples Center; 19,060	13–6
20	December 9	Toronto	W 102–83	Blake Griffin (19)	DeAndre Jordan (10)	Eric Bledsoe (6)	Staples Center; 19,060	14–6
21	December 11	@ Chicago	W 94–89	Blake Griffin (22)	Griffin & Jordan (10)	Jamal Crawford (5)	United Center; 21,571	15–6
22	December 12	@ Charlotte	W 100–94	Barnes, Griffin & Paul (19)	Lamar Odom (9)	Chris Paul (10)	Time Warner Cable Arena; 16,786	16–6
23	December 15	@ Milwaukee	W 111–85	Matt Barnes (21)	Griffin & Jordan (11)	Chris Paul (13)	BMO Harris Bradley Center; 13,691	17–6
24	December 17	@ Detroit	W 88–76	Griffin & Crawford (15)	Lamar Odom (11)	Chris Paul (7)	The Palace of Auburn Hills; 13,560	18–6
25	December 19	New Orleans	W 93–77	Blake Griffin (18)	Lamar Odom (6)	Chris Paul (12)	Staples Center; 19,188	19–6
26	December 21	Sacramento	W 97–85	Chris Paul (24)	Blake Griffin (13)	Chris Paul (13)	Staples Center; 19,060	20–6
27	December 23	@ Phoenix	W 103–77	Blake Griffin (23)	Blake Griffin (11)	Chris Paul (13)	US Airways Center; 14,741	21–6
28	December 25	Denver	W 112–100	Jamal Crawford (22)	Lamar Odom (10)	Chris Paul (8)	Staples Center; 19,346	22–6
29	December 27	Boston	W 106–77	Matt Barnes (21)	Lamar Odom (13)	Chris Paul (11)	Staples Center; 19,552	23–6
30	December 28	@ Utah	W 116–114	Chris Paul (29)	Blake Griffin (13)	Chris Paul (6)	EnergySolutions Arena; 19,911	24–6
31	December 30	Utah	W 107–96	Caron Butler (29)	Blake Griffin (7)	Chris Paul (9)	Staples Center; 19,111	25–6

January : 9–7 (home: 5–2; road: 4–5)

Game	Date	Team	Score	High points	High rebounds	High assists	Location Attendance	Record
32	January 1	@ Denver	L 78–92	Griffin & Bledsoe (12)	DeAndre Jordan (11)	Chris Paul (6)	Pepsi Center; 19,155	25–7
33	January 2	@ Golden State	L 94–115	Jamal Crawford (24)	Lamar Odom (9)	Chris Paul (6)	Oracle Arena; 19,596	25–8
34	January 4	L. A. Lakers	W 107–102	Chris Paul (30)	DeAndre Jordan (9)	Chris Paul (13)	Staples Center; 20,179	26–8
35	January 5	Golden State	W 115–89	Chris Paul (27)	Jordan & Barnes (8)	Chris Paul (9)	Staples Center; 19,323	27–8
36	January 9	Dallas	W 99–93	Paul & Barnes (19)	Blake Griffin (13)	Chris Paul (16)	Staples Center; 19,362	28–8
37	January 12	Orlando	L 101–104	Blake Griffin (30)	Blake Griffin (8)	Chris Paul (16)	Staples Center; 19,060	28–9
38	January 14	@ Memphis	W 99–73	Crawford & Barnes (16)	Matt Barnes (8)	Blake Griffin (5)	FedExForum; 15,837	29–9
39	January 15	@ Houston	W 117–109	Jamal Crawford (30)	Lamar Odom (11)	Blake Griffin (8)	Toyota Center; 16,823	30–9
40	January 17	@ Minnesota	W 90–77	Jamal Crawford (22)	Lamar Odom (12)	Lamar Odom (6)	Target Center; 16,198	31–9
41	January 19	Washington	W 94–87	Chris Paul (22)	Blake Griffin (11)	Chris Paul (11)	Staples Center; 19,188	32–9
42	January 21	@ Golden State	L 99–106	Blake Griffin (26)	Blake Griffin (13)	Chris Paul (9)	Oracle Arena; 19,596	32–10
43	January 22	Oklahoma City	L 97–109	Blake Griffin (31)	Blake Griffin (11)	Blake Griffin (5)	Staples Center; 19,451	32–11
44	January 24	@ Phoenix	L 88–93	Jamal Crawford (21)	Lamar Odom (11)	Crawford & Odom(4)	US Airways Center; 16,017	32–12
45	January 26	@ Portland	L 100–101	Blake Griffin (24)	Eric Bledsoe (9)	Blake Griffin (10)	Rose Garden; 20,672	32–13
46	January 27	Portland	W 96–83	Blake Griffin (23)	Lamar Odom (13)	Blake Griffin (9)	Staples Center; 19,060	33–13
47	January 30	@ Minnesota	W 96–90	Blake Griffin (26)	Blake Griffin (13)	Eric Bledsoe (10)	Target Center; 15,312	34–13

February : 8–5 (home: 3–1; road: 5–4)

Game	Date	Team	Score	High points	High rebounds	High assists	Location Attendance	Record
48	February 1	@ Toronto	L 73–98	Blake Griffin (17)	Griffin & Jordan (9)	Jamal Crawford (5)	Air Canada Centre; 19,800	34–14
49	February 3	@ Boston	L 104–106	Bledsoe & Crawford (23)	Blake Griffin (11)	Eric Bledsoe (10)	TD Garden; 18,624	34–15
50	February 4	@ Washington	L 90–98	Jamal Crawford (28)	DeAndre Jordan (22)	Eric Bledsoe (9)	Verizon Center; 16,246	34–16
51	February 6	@ Orlando	W 86–76	Eric Bledsoe (27)	DeAndre Jordan (14)	Lamar Odom (4)	Amway Center; 17,995	35–16
52	February 8	@ Miami	L 89–111	DeAndre Jordan (17)	DeAndre Jordan (6)	Eric Bledsoe (6)	American Airlines Arena; 19,902	35–17
53	February 10	@ New York	W 102–88	Jamal Crawford (27)	Blake Griffin (12)	Chris Paul (7)	Madison Square Garden; 19,033	36–17
54	February 11	@ Philadelphia	W 107–90	Chris Paul (21)	DeAndre Jordan (10)	Chris Paul (11)	Wells Fargo Center; 17,550	37–17
55	February 13	Houston	W 106–96	Blake Griffin (20)	Blake Griffin (11)	Chris Paul (11)	Staples Center; 19,251	38–17
56	February 14	@ L. A. Lakers	W 125–101	Chris Paul (24)	DeAndre Jordan (12)	Chris Paul (13)	Staples Center; 18,997	39–17
All-Star Break
57	February 21	San Antonio	L 90–116	Matt Barnes (18)	Blake Griffin (8)	Jamal Crawford (6)	Staples Center; 19,343	39–18
58	February 23	Utah	W 107–94	Caron Butler (21)	DeAndre Jordan (12)	Chris Paul (7)	Staples Center; 19,165	40–18
59	February 26	Charlotte	W 106–84	Blake Griffin (24)	Caron Butler (7)	Chris Paul (13)	Staples Center; 19,060	41–18
60	February 28	@ Indiana	W 99–91	Chris Paul (29)	Blake Griffin (14)	Chris Paul (8)	Bankers Life Fieldhouse; 18,165	42–18

March : 7–7 (home: 5–2; road: 2–5)

Game	Date	Team	Score	High points	High rebounds	High assists	Location Attendance	Record
61	March 1	@ Cleveland	W 105–89	Jamal Crawford (24)	Blake Griffin (11)	Chris Paul (15)	Quicken Loans Arena; 20,562	43–18
62	March 3	Oklahoma City	L 104–108	Chris Paul (26)	Blake Griffin (9)	Chris Paul (8)	Staples Center; 19,371	43–19
63	March 6	Milwaukee	W 117–101	Jamal Crawford (25)	Blake Griffin (11)	Blake Griffin (11)	Staples Center; 19,060	44–19
64	March 7	@ Denver	L 92–107	Matt Barnes (19)	Lamar Odom (10)	Chris Paul (10)	Pepsi Center; 18,857	44–20
65	March 10	Detroit	W 129–97	Blake Griffin (22)	Blake Griffin (8)	Chris Paul (14)	Staples Center; 19,344	45–20
66	March 13	Memphis	L 85–96	Chris Paul (24)	Lamar Odom (8)	Chris Paul (9)	Staples Center; 19,316	45–21
67	March 17	New York	W 93–80	Chris Paul (20)	Blake Griffin (12)	Chris Paul (8)	Staples Center; 19,412	46–21
68	March 19	@ Sacramento	L 101–116	Blake Griffin (26)	DeAndre Jordan (9)	Chris Paul (15)	Power Balance Pavilion; 13,563	46–22
69	March 20	Philadelphia	W 101–72	Chris Paul (16)	Blake Griffin (8)	Chris Paul (7)	Staples Center; 19,187	47–22
70	March 23	Brooklyn	W 101–95	Chris Paul (29)	DeAndre Jordan (12)	Chris Paul (11)	Staples Center; 19,506	48–22
71	March 26	@ Dallas	L 102–109 (OT)	Chris Paul (33)	DeAndre Jordan (11)	Chris Paul & Jamal Crawford (5)	American Airlines Center; 20,291	48–23
72	March 27	@ New Orleans	W 105–91	Blake Griffin (19)	DeAndre Jordan (11)	Chris Paul (9)	New Orleans Arena; 15,128	49–23
73	March 29	@ San Antonio	L 102–104	Blake Griffin (18)	DeAndre Jordan (8)	Chris Paul (12)	AT&T Center; 18,581	49–24
74	March 30	@ Houston	L 81–98	Chris Paul (19)	Ryan Hollins (8)	Chris Paul (7)	Toyota Center; 18,303	49–25

April : 7–1 (home: 4–1; road: 3–0)

Game	Date	Team	Score	High points	High rebounds	High assists	Location Attendance	Record
75	April 1	Indiana	L 106–109	Jamal Crawford (25)	Lamar Odom (10)	Chris Paul (8)	Staples Center; 19,384	49–26
76	April 3	Phoenix	W 126–101	DeAndre Jordan (20)	DeAndre Jordan (12)	Chris Paul (12)	Staples Center; 19,137	50–26
77	April 7	L. A. Lakers	W 109–95	Paul & Griffin (24)	DeAndre Jordan (13)	Chris Paul (12)	Staples Center; 19,768	51–26
78	April 10	Minnesota	W 111–95	Blake Griffin (19)	Lamar Odom (13)	Chris Paul (11)	Staples Center; 19,060	52–26
79	April 12	@ New Orleans	W 96–93	Blake Griffin (20)	Matt Barnes (10)	Chris Paul (14)	New Orleans Arena; 15,206	53–26
80	April 13	@ Memphis	W 91–87	DeAndre Jordan (16)	DeAndre Jordan (12)	Chris Paul (5)	FedExForum; 18,119	54–26
81	April 16	Portland	W 93–77	Caron Butler (22)	Lamar Odom (12)	Chris Paul (11)	Staples Center; 19,183	55–26
82	April 17	@ Sacramento	W 112–108	Chris Paul (25)	DeAndre Jordan (10)	Chris Paul (11)	Sleep Train Arena; 17,317	56–26

2012–13 season schedule

== Playoffs ==
=== Game log ===
2013 playoff game log
Total: 2–4 (home: 2–1; road: 0–3)
First Round: 2–4 (home: 2–1; road: 0–3)

Game	Date	Team	Score	High points	High rebounds	High assists	Location Attendance	Series
1	April 20	Memphis	W 113–91	Chris Paul (23)	DeAndre Jordan (8)	Chris Paul (7)	Staples Center; 19,339	1–0
2	April 22	Memphis	W 93–91	Mike Conley Jr. (28)	Tony Allen (10)	Chris Paul (9)	Staples Center; 19,570	2–0
3	April 25	@ Memphis	L 82–94	Zach Randolph (27)	Zach Randolph (11)	Mike Conley Jr. (10)	FedExForum; 19,596	2–1
4	April 27	@ Memphis	L 83–104	Zach Randolph (24)	Marc Gasol (13)	Mike Conley Jr. (13)	FedExForum; 19,596	2–2
5	April 30	Memphis	L 93–103	Chris Paul (35)	Zach Randolph (11)	Mike Conley Jr. (6)	Staples Center; 19,657	2–3
6	May 3	@ Memphis	L 105–118	Matt Barnes (30)	Matt Barnes (10)	Chris Paul (8)	FedExForum; 19,596	2–4

2013 playoff schedule

=== Standings ===
Pacific Division	W	L	PCT	GB	Home	Road	Div	GP
y-Los Angeles Clippers	56	26	.683	–	32–9	24–17	11–5	82
x-Golden State Warriors	47	35	.573	9	28–13	19–22	9–7	82
x-Los Angeles Lakers	45	37	.549	11	29–12	16–25	8–8	82
Sacramento Kings	28	54	.341	28	20–21	8–33	7–9	82
Phoenix Suns	25	57	.305	31	17–24	8–33	5–11	82

Western Conference
#	Team	W	L	PCT	GB	GP
1	c-Oklahoma City Thunder *	60	22	.732	–	82
2	y-San Antonio Spurs *	58	24	.707	2.0	82
3	x-Denver Nuggets *	57	25	.695	3.0	82
4	y-Los Angeles Clippers	56	26	.683	4.0	82
5	x-Memphis Grizzlies	56	26	.683	4.0	82
6	x-Golden State Warriors	47	35	.573	13.0	82
7	x-Los Angeles Lakers	45	37	.549	15.0	82
8	x-Houston Rockets	45	37	.549	15.0	82
9	Utah Jazz	43	39	.524	17.0	82
10	Dallas Mavericks	41	41	.500	19.0	82
11	Portland Trail Blazers	33	49	.402	27.0	82
12	Minnesota Timberwolves	31	51	.378	29.0	82
13	Sacramento Kings	28	54	.341	32.0	82
14	New Orleans Hornets	27	55	.329	33.0	82
15	Phoenix Suns	25	57	.305	35.0	82

== Player statistics ==
Legend
GP	Games played	GS	Games started	MPG	Minutes per game
FG%	Field-goal percentage	3P%	3-point field-goal percentage	FT%	Free-throw percentage
RPG	Rebounds per game	APG	Assists per game	SPG	Steals per game
BPG	Blocks per game	PPG	Points per game

=== Regular season ===
Player	GP	GS	MPG	FG%	3P%	FT%	RPG	APG	SPG	BPG	PPG
DeAndre Jordan	82	82	24.5	.643		.386	7.2	.3	.6	1.4	8.8
Lamar Odom	82	2	19.7	.399	.200	.476	5.9	1.7	.8	.7	4.0
Blake Griffin	80	80	32.5	.538	.179	.660	8.3	3.7	1.2	.6	18.0
Matt Barnes	80	4	25.7	.462	.342	.744	4.6	1.5	1.0	.8	10.3
Caron Butler	78	78	24.1	.424	.388	.833	2.9	1.0	.7	.1	10.4
Eric Bledsoe	76	12	20.4	.445	.397	.791	3.0	3.1	1.4	.7	8.5
Jamal Crawford	76	0	29.3	.438	.376	.871	1.7	2.5	1.0	.2	16.5
Willie Green	72	60	16.5	.461	.428	.719	1.3	.8	.4	.2	6.3
Chris Paul	70	70	33.4	.481	.328	.885	3.7	9.7	2.4	.1	16.9
Ronny Turiaf	65	0	10.8	.505		.365	2.3	.5	.3	.5	1.9
Ryan Hollins	60	0	11.1	.614		.750	2.3	.2	.1	.6	3.4
Grant Hill	29	0	15.1	.388	.273	.583	1.7	.9	.4	.2	3.2
Chauncey Billups	22	22	19.0	.402	.367	.938	1.5	2.2	.5	.0	8.4
Maalik Wayns^{†}	6	0	6.2	.438	.333	1.000	.3	1.2	.5	.0	3.3
DaJuan Summers	2	0	3.5	.250			1.0	.5	.0	.0	1.0

=== Playoffs ===
Player	GP	GS	MPG	FG%	3P%	FT%	RPG	APG	SPG	BPG	PPG
Chris Paul	6	6	37.3	.533	.316	.892	4.0	6.3	1.8	.0	22.8
DeAndre Jordan	6	6	24.0	.455		.222	6.3	.2	.2	1.7	3.7
Caron Butler	6	6	22.7	.478	.250	1.000	2.7	.0	.3	.3	8.5
Chauncey Billups	6	6	19.2	.306	.353	.818	2.0	1.0	.2	.2	6.2
Blake Griffin	6	5	26.3	.453		.808	5.5	2.5	.0	.8	13.2
Lamar Odom	6	1	17.8	.367	.357	.500	3.8	1.8	.8	.8	5.0
Matt Barnes	6	0	27.0	.545	.412	.842	5.0	.5	.7	.3	11.8
Jamal Crawford	6	0	26.8	.387	.273	1.000	2.0	1.7	.5	.2	10.8
Eric Bledsoe	6	0	16.2	.500	.111	.667	2.5	3.0	.3	.5	6.5
Ronny Turiaf	5	0	11.8	.700		.500	1.6	.0	.2	.6	3.2
Ryan Hollins	5	0	7.4	.556		.500	1.0	.4	.0	.4	2.2
Willie Green	3	0	6.7	.667	.000	1.000	1.0	.7	.3	.0	2.0
Grant Hill	1	0	20.0	.500			4.0	2.0	.0	.0	4.0

- ^{†} Denotes player spent time with another team in the season. Stats reflect time with the Clippers only.

== Injuries and surgeries ==
Player	Injury Date	Injury Type
Trey Thompkins	October 31, 2012	Bone bruise on left knee (out for the season)

== Transactions ==
=== Trades ===
June 29, 2012
To Los Angeles Clippers

Lamar Odom (from Dallas)

To Dallas Mavericks

Draft rights to Tadija Dragićević (from Utah)

Cash considerations (from Houston)

To Utah Jazz

Mo Williams (from Los Angeles)

To Houston Rockets

Draft rights to Furkan Aldemir (from Los Angeles)

July 11, 2012
To Los Angeles Clippers

Two 2016 second-round draft picks

To Brooklyn Nets

Reggie Evans

July 30, 2012
To Los Angeles Clippers

Willie Green

To Atlanta Hawks

Draft rights to Sofoklis Schortsanitis

=== Free agents ===
==== Re-signed ====
Player	Signed	Contract
Blake Griffin	July 11, 2012	5-year contract extension
Reggie Evans	July 11, 2012	3-year deal (Sign & trade with Nets)
Chauncey Billups	July 13, 2012	One-year deal

==== Additions ====
Player	Signed	Former Team
Jamal Crawford	July 11, 2012	Portland Trail Blazers
Grant Hill	July 17, 2012	Phoenix Suns
Ryan Hollins	July 21, 2012	Boston Celtics
Ronny Turiaf	July 27, 2012	Miami Heat
Matt Barnes	September 14, 2012	Los Angeles Lakers
Maalik Wayns	March 9, 2013	Rio Grande Valley Vipers (NBDL)
DaJuan Summers	March 15, 2013	Maine Red Claws (NBDL)

==== Subtractions ====
Player	Reason left	New team
Bobby Simmons	Free agency, July 1, 2012	Ball Hogs (BIG3)
Nick Young	Free agency, July 12, 2012	Philadelphia 76ers
Ryan Gomes	Waived, July 17, 2012	Artland Dragons (BBL)
Randy Foye	Free agency, July 25, 2012	Utah Jazz
Travis Leslie	Waived, October 30, 2012	Santa Cruz Warriors (NBDL)
Kenyon Martin	Free agency, February 21, 2013	New York Knicks
Trey Thompkins	Waived, March 14, 2013	BC Nizhny Novgorod (VTB United League)
