= Dean Demopoulos =

American professional basketball coach

Personal information
- Born: March 29, 1954 (age 72) Philadelphia, Pennsylvania, U.S.
- Coaching career: 1983–present

Career history

Coaching
- 1983–2000: Temple (assistant)
- 2000–2001: UMKC
- 2001–2005: Seattle SuperSonics (assistant)
- 2005–2010: Portland Trail Blazers (assistant)
- 2010–2013: Los Angeles Clippers (assistant)
- 2015–2017: Melbourne United
- 2018–2019: Grand Rapids Drive (assistant)
- 2022–2023: Saskatchewan Rattlers

Dean Demopoulos (born March 29, 1954) is an American professional basketball coach.

== Early life ==
Demopoulos was born in Philadelphia, Pennsylvania, and graduated from West Chester State in 1977 with a degree in comprehensive social sciences. He began his coaching career at Kennett High School in Kennett Square, Pennsylvania.

== College coaching career ==
In 1983, Demopoulos became an assistant to John Chaney at Temple University, a post he held until 2000. During that span, the Owls became a national basketball powerhouse, amassing a 393–151 (72.2%) record and making it to the NCAA Tournament 16 times and to the Elite Eight on four occasions.

For the 2000–01 college season, Demopoulos served as head coach of the UMKC Kangaroos team. In his one season as coach, the Roos were ranked in the top 10 nationally in several statistical categories, including fewest turnovers (9.5 per game) and scoring defense (60.5 points per game).

== Professional coaching career ==
=== NBA (2001–2013) ===
Between 2001 and 2005, Demopoulos served as an assistant to Nate McMillan at the Seattle SuperSonics in the NBA. With McMillan's move to the Portland Trail Blazers in 2005, Demopoulos joined him and again served as his lead assistant. After five seasons with the Trail Blazers, Demopoulos was hired as an assistant to Vinny Del Negro at the Los Angeles Clippers in 2010. He served under Del Negro for all three of his seasons, with Demopoulos leaving the Clippers in 2013.

=== Melbourne United (2015–2017) ===
In April 2015, Demopoulos was hired by Australian NBL club Melbourne United to be head coach on a two-year deal. He guided United to a 9–0 record to begin the 2015–16 season, which saw him set the best start to a debut head coaching season in league history. He was subsequently named NBL Coach of the Month for October 2015. Melbourne finished the regular season in first place with an 18–10 record, but went on to lose 2–0 to the fourth-seeded New Zealand Breakers in the semi-finals.

In 2016–17, Melbourne failed to make the finals despite boasting a bevy of stars. They entered the final round of the season in third place but lost both of their games, which saw them finish in sixth place with a 13–15 record. His contract was subsequently not renewed following the 2016–17 season.

=== Grand Rapids Drive (2018–2019) ===
Demopoulos spent the 2018–19 season as an assistant to Ryan Krueger at the Grand Rapids Drive of the NBA G League.

=== Saskatchewan Rattlers (2022–2023) ===
On January 19, 2022, Demopoulos was announced as the new head coach of the Saskatchewan Rattlers of the Canadian Elite Basketball League (CEBL). However, he was fired on July 4, 2023.

== Head coaching record ==
Record table
Season	Team	Overall	Conference	Standing	Postseason
UMKC Kangaroos (Mid-Continent Conference) (2000–2001)
2000–01	UMKC	14–16	9–7	4th	
UMKC:		14–16 (.467)	9–7 (.563)		
Total:		14–16 (.467)			
National champion Postseason invitational champion Conference regular season champion Conference regular season and conference tournament champion Division regular season champion Division regular season and conference tournament champion Conference tournament champion
