= 2010–11 Los Angeles Clippers season =

NBA professional basketball team season

- Head coach: Vinny Del Negro
- General manager: Neil Olshey
- Owners: Donald Sterling
- Arena: Staples Center

Results
- Record: 32–50 (.390)
- Place: Division: 4th (Pacific); Conference: 13th (Western)
- Playoff finish: Did not qualify
- Stats at Basketball Reference

Local media
- Television: Prime Ticket, Fox Sports West
- Radio: KFWB

The 2010–11 Los Angeles Clippers season was the 41st season of the franchise in the National Basketball Association (NBA), and the 27th in Los Angeles.

This was Blake Griffin's first year in the league. He was named an All-Star, becoming the first rookie to do so since Yao Ming in 2003. Despite the team's mediocre record, Griffin was named Rookie of the Year at season's end.

On February 24, 2011, the Clippers traded away Baron Davis and their first-round pick to the Cleveland Cavaliers for fellow point guard Mo Williams and forward Jamario Moon, in a move to clear cap space in advance of free agency. The pick, which would have been the 8th based on record, reached #1 overall in the Lottery after starting at just 2.8% odds. Cleveland selected future 8x All-Star Kyrie Irving with the Clippers selection.

As of 2026, this was the last time the Clippers finished with a losing season.

== Key dates ==
- June 24 – The 2010 NBA draft was held in New York City.
- July 1 – The free agency period begun.

== Draft picks ==
Round	Pick	Player	Position	Nationality	College/Team
1	8	Al-Farouq Aminu	SF	United States	Wake Forest
2	54	Willie Warren	PG	United States	Oklahoma

== Roster ==
2010–11 Los Angeles Clippers roster
Players

Pos.	No.	Player	Height	Weight	DOB	From
SF	3	Al-Farouq Aminu	6 ft 9 in (2.06 m)	215 lb (98 kg)	1990-09-21	Wake Forest
PG	12	Eric Bledsoe	6 ft 1 in (1.85 m)	195 lb (88 kg)	1989-12-09	Kentucky
PF	34	Brian Cook	6 ft 9 in (2.06 m)	250 lb (113 kg)	1980-12-04	Illinois
PF	50	Ike Diogu	6 ft 9 in (2.06 m)	250 lb (113 kg)	1983-09-11	Arizona State
SG	4	Randy Foye	6 ft 4 in (1.93 m)	213 lb (97 kg)	1983-09-24	Villanova
SF	15	Ryan Gomes	6 ft 7 in (2.01 m)	245 lb (111 kg)	1982-09-01	Providence
SG	10	Eric Gordon	6 ft 3 in (1.91 m)	222 lb (101 kg)	1988-12-25	Indiana
PF	32	Blake Griffin	6 ft 9 in (2.06 m)	251 lb (114 kg)	1989-03-16	Oklahoma
C	9	DeAndre Jordan	6 ft 11 in (2.11 m)	250 lb (113 kg)	1988-07-21	Texas A&M
C	35	Chris Kaman	7 ft 0 in (2.13 m)	265 lb (120 kg)	1982-04-28	Central Michigan
SF	8	Jamario Moon	6 ft 8 in (2.03 m)	205 lb (93 kg)	1980-06-13	Meridian CC
PF	1	Craig Smith	6 ft 7 in (2.01 m)	250 lb (113 kg)	1983-11-10	Boston College
PG	13	Willie Warren (DL)	6 ft 4 in (1.93 m)	205 lb (93 kg)	1989-10-22	Oklahoma
PG	25	Mo Williams	6 ft 1 in (1.85 m)	195 lb (88 kg)	1982-12-19	Alabama

Coaches
Head coach
- Vinny Del Negro
Assistant(s)
- Dean Demopoulos
- Marc Iavaroni
- Robert Pack
- Dave Severns
- Howard Eisley
- Jasen Powell (trainer)

Legend
- (DP) Unsigned draft pick
- (FA) Free agent
- (S) Suspended
- (DL) On assignment to D-League affiliate
- Injured

Roster
Updated: April 11, 2011

=== Roster notes ===
- Forward Brian Cook becomes the 16th former Laker to play with the crosstown rival Clippers.

== Pre-season ==
=== Game log ===
2010 pre-season game log
Pre-season: 1–7 (home: 0–5; road: 1–2)

Game	Date	Team	Score	High points	High rebounds	High assists	Location Attendance	Record
1	October 5	@ Portland	L 86–115	Chris Kaman (14)	Chris Kaman, Blake Griffin (7)	Randy Foye (5)	Rose Garden; 18,209	0–1
2	October 7	@ Sacramento	W 120–88	Chris Kaman (20)	Blake Griffin (13)	Randy Foye (8)	ARCO Arena; 10,284	1–1
3	October 8	@ Golden State	L 87–127	Blake Griffin (23)	Blake Griffin (9)	Randy Foye (6)	Oracle Arena; 10,004	1–2
4	October 12	San Antonio	L 99–100	Eric Gordon (23)	Blake Griffin (17)	Baron Davis (7)	Palacio de los Deportes; 18,674	1–3
5	October 14	Denver	L 95–100	Blake Griffin (24)	Blake Griffin (14)	Baron Davis (6)	Staples Center; 10,572	1–4
6	October 16	Utah	L 91–103	Eric Gordon (23)	Blake Griffin (14)	Baron Davis (8)	Staples Center; 18,997	1–5
7	October 17	Denver	L 104–108	Brian Cook (28)	Al-Farouq Aminu (8)	Baron Davis, Eric Bledsoe (7)	Staples Center	1–6
8	October 19	Sacramento	L 94–96	Chris Kaman (21)	Chris Kaman (10)	Baron Davis (8)	Staples Center; 10,838	1–7

2010–11 season schedule

== Regular season ==
=== Standings ===
Pacific Division	W	L	PCT	GB	Home	Road	Div
y-Los Angeles Lakers	57	25	.695	–	30–11	27–14	12–4
Phoenix Suns	40	42	.488	17	23–18	17–24	9–7
Golden State Warriors	36	46	.439	21	26–15	10–31	5–11
Los Angeles Clippers	32	50	.390	25	23–18	9–32	7–9
Sacramento Kings	24	58	.293	33	11–30	13–28	7–9

#	Western Conference				
#	Team	W	L	PCT	GB
1	c-San Antonio Spurs	61	21	.744	–
2	y-Los Angeles Lakers	57	25	.695	4
3	x-Dallas Mavericks	57	25	.695	4
4	y-Oklahoma City Thunder	55	27	.671	6
5	x-Denver Nuggets	50	32	.610	11
6	x-Portland Trail Blazers	48	34	.585	13
7	x-New Orleans Hornets	46	36	.561	15
8	x-Memphis Grizzlies	46	36	.561	15
9	Houston Rockets	43	39	.524	18
10	Phoenix Suns	40	42	.488	21
11	Utah Jazz	39	43	.476	22
12	Golden State Warriors	36	46	.439	25
13	Los Angeles Clippers	32	50	.390	29
14	Sacramento Kings	24	58	.293	37
15	Minnesota Timberwolves	17	65	.207	44

=== Game log ===
2010–11 game log
Total: 32–50 (Home: 23–18; Road: 9–32)
October: 0–3 (home: 0–2; road: 0–1)

Game	Date	Team	Score	High points	High rebounds	High assists	Location Attendance	Record
1	October 27	Portland	L 88–98	Eric Gordon (22)	Blake Griffin (14)	Randy Foye (5)	Staples Center; 18,382	0–1
2	October 29	@ Golden State	L 91–109	Eric Gordon (19)	Blake Griffin (10)	Baron Davis (8)	Oracle Arena; 17,408	0–2
3	October 31	Dallas	L 83–99	Blake Griffin (16)	Chris Kaman (13)	Baron Davis (6)	Staples Center; 13,718	0–3

November: 3–12 (home: 3–5; road: 0–7)

Game	Date	Team	Score	High points	High rebounds	High assists	Location Attendance	Record
4	November 1	San Antonio	L 88–97	Eric Gordon (23)	Blake Griffin, Chris Kaman (8)	Eric Gordon (11)	Staples Center; 14,964	0–4
5	November 3	Oklahoma City	W 107–92	Eric Gordon (27)	Blake Griffin (9)	Eric Bledsoe (8)	Staples Center; 18,414	1–4
6	November 5	@ Denver	L 104–111	Blake Griffin (26)	Blake Griffin (10)	Eric Bledsoe (13)	Pepsi Center; 15,559	1–5
7	November 6	@ Utah	L 107–109 (2OT)	Eric Gordon (27)	Blake Griffin (17)	Eric Gordon (5)	EnergySolutions Arena; 19,911	1–6
8	November 9	@ New Orleans	L 82–101	Al-Farouq Aminu (20)	Al-Farouq Aminu (8)	Eric Bledsoe (8)	New Orleans Arena; 12,479	1–7
9	November 10	@ San Antonio	L 95–107	Rasual Butler (18)	Blake Griffin (8)	Eric Bledsoe, Willie Warren (6)	AT&T Center; 17,309	1–8
10	November 12	Detroit	L 107–113	Eric Gordon (28)	Blake Griffin (18)	Eric Bledsoe, Eric Gordon (5)	Staples Center; 16,960	1–9
11	November 15	New Jersey	L 96–110	Eric Gordon (30)	Eric Bledsoe, DeAndre Jordan (8)	Eric Bledsoe (6)	Staples Center; 14,516	1–10
12	November 17	@ Minnesota	L 111–113	Eric Gordon (30)	Blake Griffin (17)	Eric Gordon (7)	Target Center; 12,909	1–11
13	November 18	@ Indiana	L 80–107	Eric Gordon (19)	Al-Farouq Aminu, Eric Bledsoe, Blake Griffin (8)	Eric Bledsoe (5)	Conseco Fieldhouse; 12,459	1–12
14	November 20	New York	L 115–124	Blake Griffin (44)	Blake Griffin (15)	Blake Griffin (7)	Staples Center; 18,325	1–13
15	November 22	New Orleans	W 99–95	Eric Gordon (27)	Blake Griffin (13)	Eric Bledsoe (6)	Staples Center; 17,787	2–13
16	November 25	Sacramento	W 100–82	Eric Gordon (28)	Blake Griffin (15)	Eric Gordon (6)	Staples Center; 11,504	3–13
17	November 26	@ Phoenix	L 108–116	Eric Gordon (32)	Blake Griffin (14)	Eric Gordon (6)	US Airways Center; 17,486	3–14
18	November 28	Utah	L 97–109	Blake Griffin (35)	Blake Griffin (14)	Eric Gordon (9)	Staples Center; 17,085	3–15

December: 7–8 (home: 4–5; road: 3–3)

Game	Date	Team	Score	High points	High rebounds	High assists	Location Attendance	Record
19	December 1	San Antonio	W 90–85	Blake Griffin (31)	Blake Griffin, DeAndre Jordan (13)	Baron Davis (10)	Staples Center; 16,584	4–15
20	December 3	@ Denver	L 104–109	Eric Gordon (24)	Blake Griffin (12)	Eric Bledsoe (8)	Pepsi Center; 15,829	4–16
21	December 5	@ Portland	L 91–100	Eric Gordon (24)	Blake Griffin (15)	Baron Davis (8)	Rose Garden; 20,139	4–17
22	December 6	Sacramento	W 98–91	Eric Gordon (29)	Blake Griffin (11)	Baron Davis (8)	Staples Center; 14,964	5–17
23	December 8	L.A. Lakers	L 86–87	Eric Gordon (24)	Blake Griffin, DeAndre Jordan (11)	Eric Bledsoe (7)	Staples Center; 19,614	5–18
24	December 11	Memphis	L 83–84	Eric Gordon (25)	DeAndre Jordan (14)	Eric Bledsoe (6)	Staples Center; 14,970	5–19
25	December 12	Orlando	L 85–94	Eric Gordon (28)	Blake Griffin (16)	Eric Gordon (8)	Staples Center; 18,278	5–20
26	December 15	@ Philadelphia	L 91–105	Blake Griffin (20)	Blake Griffin (15)	Baron Davis, Blake Griffin (5)	Wells Fargo Center; 11,775	5–21
27	December 17	@ Detroit	W 109–88	Blake Griffin (24)	Blake Griffin (17)	Eric Bledsoe (8)	The Palace of Auburn Hills; 16,046	6–21
28	December 18	@ Chicago	W 100–99	Blake Griffin (29)	Blake Griffin (12)	Baron Davis (7)	United Center; 21,760	7–21
29	December 20	Minnesota	W 113–90	Eric Gordon (36)	Ryan Gomes, Blake Griffin (10)	Baron Davis (12)	Staples Center; 16,053	8–21
30	December 22	Houston	L 92–97	Blake Griffin (24)	Blake Griffin (18)	Eric Gordon (6)	Staples Center; 17,470	8–22
31	December 26	Phoenix	W 108–103	Blake Griffin (28)	Blake Griffin (12)	Baron Davis (9)	Staples Center; 19,060	9–22
32	December 27	@ Sacramento	W 100–99	Eric Gordon (31)	Blake Griffin (14)	Baron Davis (9)	ARCO Arena; 14,590	10–22
33	December 29	Utah	L 95–103	Blake Griffin (30)	Blake Griffin (12)	Baron Davis (9)	Staples Center; 19,060	10–23

January: 9–5 (home: 9–1; road: 0–4)

Game	Date	Team	Score	High points	High rebounds	High assists	Location Attendance	Record
34	January 2	Atlanta	L 98–107	Blake Griffin (31)	Blake Griffin (15)	Eric Gordon (6)	Staples Center; 16,750	10–24
35	January 5	Denver	W 106–93	Eric Gordon (28)	DeAndre Jordan (20)	Baron Davis (8)	Staples Center; 17,540	11–24
36	January 9	Golden State	W 105–91	Eric Gordon (25)	DeAndre Jordan (13)	Baron Davis (11)	Staples Center; 17,696	12–24
37	January 12	Miami	W 111–105	Eric Gordon (26)	Blake Griffin (14)	Baron Davis (9)	Staples Center; 19,803	13–24
38	January 14	@ Golden State	L 112–122	Eric Gordon, Blake Griffin (28)	Blake Griffin (13)	Eric Gordon (7)	Oracle Arena; 19,273	13–25
39	January 16	L.A. Lakers	W 99–92	Eric Gordon (30)	Blake Griffin, DeAndre Jordan (15)	Baron Davis (8)	Staples Center; 19,905	14–25
40	January 17	Indiana	W 114–107	Blake Griffin (47)	Blake Griffin (14)	Baron Davis (12)	Staples Center; 15,863	15–25
41	January 19	Minnesota	W 126–111	Blake Griffin (29)	DeAndre Jordan (12)	Blake Griffin (6)	Staples Center; 17,793	16–25
42	January 20	@ Portland	L 93–108	Eric Gordon (35)	Blake Griffin (18)	Baron Davis (6)	Rose Garden; 20,630	16–26
43	January 22	Golden State	W 113–109	Blake Griffin (30)	Blake Griffin (18)	Blake Griffin (8)	Staples Center; 19,373	17–26
44	January 25	@ Dallas	L 105–112	Blake Griffin (22)	Blake Griffin (11)	Baron Davis (6)	American Airlines Center; 20,335	17–27
45	January 26	@ Houston	L 83–96	Randy Foye (20)	DeAndre Jordan (12)	Eric Bledsoe (6)	Toyota Center; 18,147	17–28
46	January 29	Charlotte	W 103–88	Blake Griffin (24)	Blake Griffin (10)	Baron Davis (11)	Staples Center; 18,332	18–28
47	January 31	Milwaukee	W 105–98	Blake Griffin (32)	Blake Griffin (11)	Baron Davis (7)	Staples Center; 17,218	19–28

February: 2–12 (home: 0–2; road: 2–10)

Game	Date	Team	Score	High points	High rebounds	High assists	Location Attendance	Record
48	February 2	Chicago	L 88–106	Blake Griffin (32)	Blake Griffin (13)	Blake Griffin (7)	Staples Center; 19,368	19–29
49	February 4	@ Atlanta	L 100–101	Baron Davis (22)	Blake Griffin (11)	Baron Davis (13)	Philips Arena; 19,363	19–30
50	February 6	@ Miami	L 79–97	Blake Griffin (21)	Blake Griffin (16)	Baron Davis (6)	American Airlines Arena; 19,702	19–31
51	February 8	@ Orlando	L 85–101	Baron Davis (25)	Blake Griffin (12)	Baron Davis (8)	Amway Center; 18,987	19–32
52	February 9	@ New York	W 116–108	Randy Foye (24)	Eric Bledsoe, DeAndre Jordan (8)	Baron Davis (16)	Madison Square Garden; 19,763	20–32
53	February 11	@ Cleveland	L 119–126 (OT)	Blake Griffin (32)	Blake Griffin (13)	Baron Davis (7)	Quicken Loans Arena; 20,562	20–33
54	February 13	@ Toronto	L 93–98	Blake Griffin (21)	Blake Griffin (15)	Baron Davis (7)	Air Canada Centre; 19,800	20–34
55	February 14	@ Milwaukee	L 78–102	Baron Davis (22)	Blake Griffin (12)	Baron Davis, Blake Griffin (6)	Bradley Center; 13,111	20–35
56	February 16	@ Minnesota	W 98–90	Blake Griffin (29)	Eric Bledsoe, Blake Griffin, DeAndre Jordan (8)	Baron Davis, Randy Foye (6)	Target Center; 15,227	21–35
All-Star Break
57	February 22	@ Oklahoma City	L 88–111	Blake Griffin (28)	Blake Griffin (11)	Blake Griffin (8)	Oklahoma City Arena; 18,203	21–36
58	February 23	@ New Orleans	L 87–98	Blake Griffin (21)	Blake Griffin (13)	Randy Foye (9)	New Orleans Arena; 17,537	21–37
59	February 25	@ L.A. Lakers	L 95–108	Randy Foye (24)	Blake Griffin (10)	Eric Bledsoe (8)	Staples Center; 18,997	21–38
60	February 26	Boston	L 92–99	Randy Foye (32)	Blake Griffin (11)	Randy Foye (7)	Staples Center; 19,513	21–39
61	February 28	@ Sacramento	L 99–105	Blake Griffin (27)	Blake Griffin (12)	Eric Bledsoe, Mo Williams (5)	ARCO Arena; 17,317	21–40

March: 8–6 (home: 5–3; road: 3–3)

Game	Date	Team	Score	High points	High rebounds	High assists	Location Attendance	Record
62	March 2	Houston	W 106–103	Eric Gordon (24)	DeAndre Jordan (16)	Mo Williams (11)	Staples Center; 19,060	22–40
63	March 5	Denver	W 100–94	Eric Bledsoe (20)	Blake Griffin (12)	Blake Griffin (9)	Staples Center; 19,060	23–40
64	March 7	@ Charlotte	W 92–87	Blake Griffin, Mo Williams (17)	Blake Griffin (15)	Mo Williams (7)	Time Warner Cable Arena; 16,438	24–40
65	March 9	@ Boston	W 108–103	Mo Williams (28)	DeAndre Jordan (9)	Randy Foye (12)	TD Garden; 18,624	25–40
66	March 11	@ New Jersey	L 98–102 (OT)	Blake Griffin, Chris Kaman (23)	Chris Kaman (10)	Randy Foye (7)	Prudential Center; 18,711	25–41
67	March 12	@ Washington	W 122–101	Blake Griffin (26)	DeAndre Jordan (17)	Eric Bledsoe, Mo Williams (6)	Verizon Center; 20,278	26–41
68	March 14	@ Memphis	L 82–105	Eric Bledsoe (19)	Blake Griffin (9)	Eric Bledsoe (4)	FedExForum; 15,989	26–42
69	March 16	Philadelphia	L 94–104	Randy Foye (20)	DeAndre Jordan (15)	Mo Williams (8)	Staples Center; 19,060	26–43
70	March 19	Cleveland	W 100–92	Blake Griffin (30)	Blake Griffin (8)	Blake Griffin (8)	Staples Center; 19,060	27–43
71	March 20	Phoenix	L 99–108	Chris Kaman (21)	Chris Kaman (11)	Mo Williams (7)	Staples Center; 19,060	27–44
72	March 23	Washington	W 127–119 (2OT)	Blake Griffin (33)	Blake Griffin (17)	Blake Griffin, Mo Williams (10)	Staples Center; 19,060	28–44
73	March 25	@ L.A. Lakers	L 104–112	Mo Williams (30)	DeAndre Jordan (7)	Mo Williams (6)	Staples Center; 18,997	28–45
74	March 26	Toronto	W 94–90	Blake Griffin (22)	Blake Griffin (16)	Mo Williams (6)	Staples Center; 19,060	29–45
75	March 30	Dallas	L 100–106	Blake Griffin (25)	Blake Griffin (17)	Eric Gordon, Mo Williams (5)	Staples Center; 19,060	29–46

April: 3–4 (home: 2–0; road: 1–4)

Game	Date	Team	Score	High points	High rebounds	High assists	Location Attendance	Record
76	April 1	@ Phoenix	L 98–111	Eric Gordon (21)	Blake Griffin (13)	Blake Griffin (4)	US Airways Center; 18,422	29–47
77	April 2	Oklahoma City	W 98–92	Blake Griffin (26)	Blake Griffin (16)	Eric Gordon, Mo Williams (5)	Staples Center; 19,060	30–47
78	April 5	@ Memphis	W 82–81	Mo Williams (16)	Blake Griffin (14)	Randy Foye (4)	FedExForum; 15,433	31–47
79	April 6	@ Oklahoma City	L 108–112	Blake Griffin (35)	Blake Griffin (11)	Mo Williams (9)	Oklahoma City Arena; 18,203	31–48
80	April 8	@ Dallas	L 96–107	Mo Williams (29)	DeAndre Jordan (10)	Eric Gordon, Blake Griffin, Mo Williams (6)	American Airlines Center; 20,382	31–49
81	April 9	@ Houston	L 78–99	Eric Gordon (19)	DeAndre Jordan (11)	Eric Gordon (6)	Toyota Center; 18,089	31–50
82	April 13	Memphis	W 110–103	Blake Griffin (31)	Blake Griffin, DeAndre Jordan (10)	Blake Griffin (10)	Staples Center; 19,060	32–50

2010–11 season schedule

== Player statistics ==
Legend
GP	Games played	GS	Games started	MPG	Minutes per game
FG%	Field-goal percentage	3P%	3-point field-goal percentage	FT%	Free-throw percentage
RPG	Rebounds per game	APG	Assists per game	SPG	Steals per game
BPG	Blocks per game	PPG	Points per game

=== Season ===
Player	GP	GS	MPG	FG%	3P%	FT%	RPG	APG	SPG	BPG	PPG
Al-Farouq Aminu	81	14	17.9	.394	.315	.773	3.3	.7	.7	.3	5.6
Eric Bledsoe	81	25	22.7	.424	.276	.744	2.8	3.6	1.1	.3	6.7
Rasual Butler*	41	2	18.1	.323	.326	.667	1.9	.7	.2	.4	5.0
Jarron Collins*	23	0	6.8	.333	.000	.700	.7	.0	.2	.0	.7
Brian Cook	40	0	11.2	.424	.430	.625	2.4	.4	.3	.3	4.8
Baron Davis*	43	35	29.5	.416	.296	.760	2.8	7.0	1.4	.5	12.8
Ike Diogu	36	0	13.1	.561	.000	.661	3.2	.1	.1	.1	5.8
Randy Foye	63	24	24.6	.388	.327	.893	1.6	2.7	.8	.3	9.8
Ryan Gomes	76	62	27.6	.410	.341	.718	3.3	1.6	.8	.2	7.2
Eric Gordon	56	56	37.4	.450	.364	.825	2.9	4.4	1.3	.3	22.3
Blake Griffin	82	82	38.0	.506	.292	.642	12.1	3.8	.8	.5	22.5
DeAndre Jordan	80	66	25.6	.686	.000	.452	7.2	.5	.5	1.8	7.1
Chris Kaman	32	15	26.2	.471	.000	.754	7.0	1.4	.5	1.5	12.4
Jamario Moon*	19	7	14.6	.424	.393	.833	2.5	.4	.2	.3	3.5
Craig Smith	48	0	12.2	.553	.000	.735	2.4	.6	.3	.2	5.4
Willie Warren	19	0	17.1	.371	.333	.750	.6	1.4	.3	.0	1.9
Mo Williams*	22	22	32.9	.422	.398	.880	2.5	5.6	.9	.0	15.2

* – Stats with the Clippers.

== Awards, records and milestones ==
=== Awards ===
==== All-Star ====
- Blake Griffin becomes the first rookie since Tim Duncan in 1998 to be voted by league coaches as a reserve for the Western Conference All-Stars. He also becomes the first rookie since Yao Ming in 2003 to play in an All-Star Game.
- Blake Griffin also becomes the first and only NBA player to participate in three separate NBA All-Star Weekend events: As part of the Rookie Team in The T-Mobile NBA Rookie Challenge on Friday, the Slam Dunk Contest on Saturday and the NBA All-Star Game on Sunday. He won in all three events.
- Blake Griffin becomes the third Clipper to participate and the second Clipper to win the Slam Dunk Contest.
- Eric Bledsoe is also chosen to play for the Rookie Team in The T-Mobile NBA Rookie Challenge.

== Transactions ==
=== Trades ===
June 24, 2010
February 24, 2011
To Los Angeles Clippers----
- Draft rights to Eric Bledsoe
To Los Angeles Clippers----
- (United States) Mo Williams
- (United States) Jamario Moon
To Oklahoma City Thunder----
- 2012 first-round draft pick
To Cleveland Cavaliers----
- (United States) Baron Davis
- 2011 first-round draft pick

=== Free agents ===
==== Re-signed ====
Player	Signed	Contract
Craig Smith	July 20, 2010	One-year deal
Rasual Butler	July 28, 2010	One-year deal

==== Additions ====
Player	Signed	Former Team
Randy Foye	July 8, 2010	Washington Wizards
Ryan Gomes	July 8, 2010	Portland Trail Blazers
Brian Cook	July 9, 2010	Houston Rockets
Jarron Collins	September 23, 2010 waived January 3 re-signed January 5	Phoenix Suns
Ike Diogu	December 22, 2010	Detroit Pistons

==== Subtractions ====
Player	Reason Left	New Team
Steve Blake	Free agency, July 8	Los Angeles Lakers
Drew Gooden	Free agency, July 8	Milwaukee Bucks
Travis Outlaw	Free agency, July 8	New Jersey Nets
Steve Novak	Free agency, September 23	Dallas Mavericks
Bobby Brown	Free agency, September 23	Prokom Trefl Sopot (PLK)
Mardy Collins	Free agency, September 25	Washington Wizards
Brian Skinner	Free agency, September 29	Milwaukee Bucks
Jarron Collins	Contract expired, January 25	Portland Trail Blazers
Rasual Butler	Waived, February 27	Chicago Bulls
