= Eric Bledsoe =

American basketball player (born 1989)

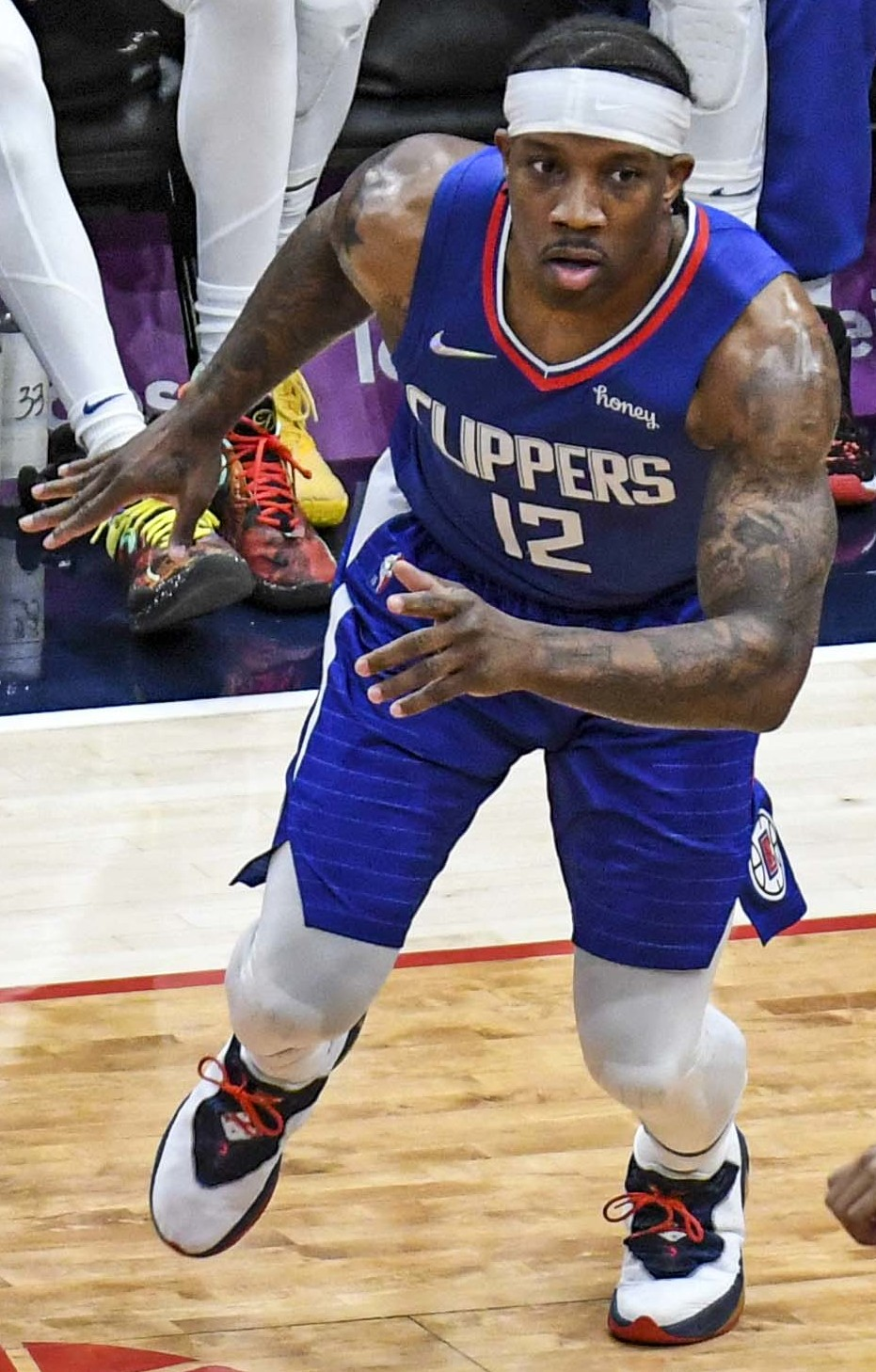
- Bledsoe with the Los Angeles Clippers in 2022

Free agent
- Position: Point guard / shooting guard

Personal information
- Born: December 9, 1989 (age 36) Birmingham, Alabama, U.S.
- Listed height: 6 ft 1 in (1.85 m)
- Listed weight: 214 lb (97 kg)

Career information
- High school: Parker (Birmingham, Alabama)
- College: Kentucky (2009–2010)
- NBA draft: 2010: 1st round, 18th overall pick
- Drafted by: Oklahoma City Thunder
- Playing career: 2010–present

Career history
- 2010–2013: Los Angeles Clippers
- 2012: →Bakersfield Jam
- 2013–2017: Phoenix Suns
- 2017–2020: Milwaukee Bucks
- 2020–2021: New Orleans Pelicans
- 2021–2022: Los Angeles Clippers
- 2022–2025: Shanghai Sharks

Career highlights
- CBA Club Cup champion (2025); CBA Club Cup Finals MVP (2025); NBA All-Defensive First Team (2019); NBA All-Defensive Second Team (2020); NBA All-Rookie Second Team (2011); SEC All-Rookie Team (2010)
- Stats at NBA.com
- Stats at Basketball Reference

Eric Bledsoe (born December 9, 1989) is an American professional basketball player who last played for the Shanghai Sharks of the Chinese Basketball Association (CBA). He plays the point guard position. After a season of college basketball with the Kentucky Wildcats, he was selected by the Oklahoma City Thunder with the 18th overall pick in the 2010 NBA draft and subsequently traded to the Los Angeles Clippers. Bledsoe had a four-year tenure with the Phoenix Suns between 2013 and 2017, before being traded to the Milwaukee Bucks.

== High school career ==
Bledsoe attended Parker High School in Birmingham, Alabama. As a senior in 2008–09, he averaged 20.3 points, 9.4 rebounds and 11.5 assists per game, and helped lead Parker to a 5A state championship runner-up finish. Considered a five-star recruit by Rivals.com, Bledsoe was listed as the No. 3 point guard and the No. 23 player in the nation in 2009.

== College career ==
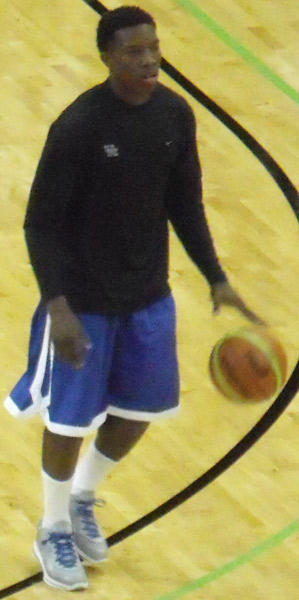
Bledsoe warming up before a game in 2010 while he was at Kentucky.

Bledsoe played one season at Kentucky in 2009–10, and averaged 11.3 points, 3.1 rebounds and 2.9 assists in 37 games (35 starts) to help the Wildcats to a 35–3 record and Elite Eight appearance. He was named to the Sporting News SEC All-Freshman Team and was a CollegeInsider.com Freshman All-American. He scored in double digits 20 times, including four games with at least 20 points. In four NCAA tournament games, he averaged 15.3 points and set a Kentucky school record of eight made three-pointers in an NCAA tournament game against East Tennessee State in scoring a career-high 29 points (9–11 FG, 8–9 3 FG). Despite being a natural point guard, Bledsoe often filled the shooting guard role playing alongside fellow freshman John Wall.

On April 7, 2010, Bledsoe declared for the NBA draft, forgoing his final three seasons of collegiate eligibility.

=== Grade controversy ===
In September 2010, it was reported that Bledsoe may have been ineligible to play his one season for Kentucky when discrepancies were found in his high school transcripts. The Alabama Public School System hired the independent law firm of White Arnold & Dowd to investigate claims that one of Bledsoe's grades was improperly changed. His algebra grade had been changed from a C to an A, thus raising his GPA high enough that he was eligible for the NCAA.

Though the investigators concluded that the instructor's reasons for changing the grade were "not credible", and that a significant number of his high school grades were written over to reflect higher grades, the school board voted to allow the grade to stand, and the NCAA declared its investigation of Bledsoe's eligibility closed the following week.

== Professional career ==
=== Los Angeles Clippers (2010–2013) ===
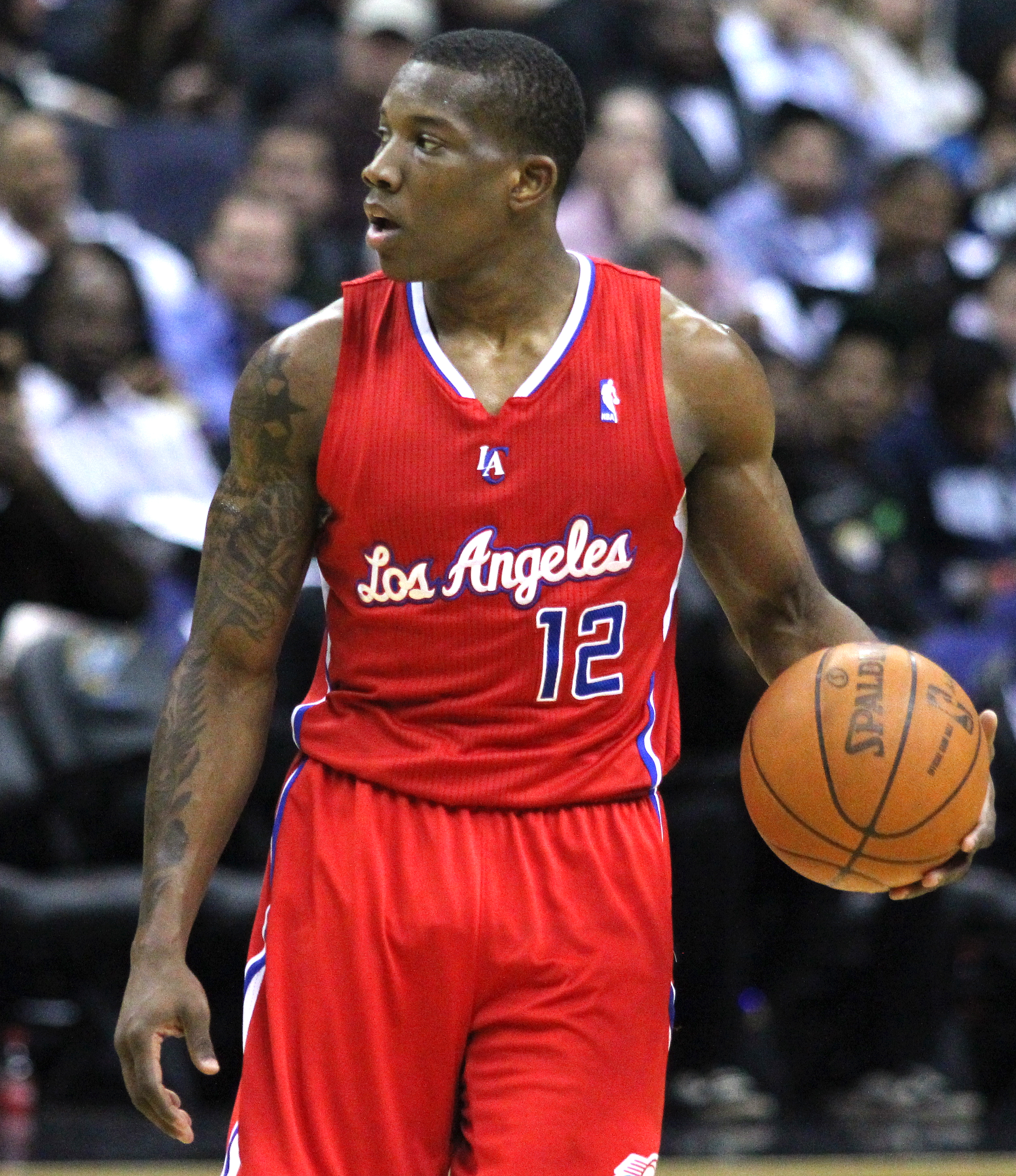
Bledsoe with the Clippers in 2011

During pre-draft workout, Bledsoe was touted for his quickness, ball handling ability, and ability to make three-point field goals. He was subsequently selected with the 18th overall pick in the 2010 NBA draft by the Oklahoma City Thunder, but was traded to the Los Angeles Clippers. In his first season, he averaged 6.7 points and 3.6 assists and started 25 games. As a result, he was named to the NBA All-Rookie Second Team. In his second season, due to the Clippers' acquisition of Chris Paul, he played only an average of 11 minutes per game, with only one start, and his stats dropped. In fact, during that season, he ended up being assigned to the Clippers' NBA Development League affiliate team, the Bakersfield Jam. However, during his third season, his statistics ended up rising in spite of still being behind Chris Paul for most of the games that he played. Bledsoe also participated in the 2013 All-Star Game's Slam Dunk Contest.

=== Phoenix Suns (2013–2017) ===
==== 2013–14 season ====
On July 10, 2013, Bledsoe was traded to the Phoenix Suns alongside teammate Caron Butler in a three-way trade with the L.A. Clippers and the Milwaukee Bucks that sent the Suns' Jared Dudley and the Bucks' JJ Redick to the Clippers with two different second round picks going to the Bucks. On his opening night debut with the Suns, Bledsoe helped the team by getting 22 points, 6 rebounds, and 7 assists in a 104–91 victory over the Portland Trail Blazers. In his second game with the Suns, Bledsoe hit his first ever game-winning shot in an 87–84 home victory over the Utah Jazz. Before the November 19, 2013, game against the Sacramento Kings, Bledsoe's shin collided with teammate P. J. Tucker during practice. He would miss six games before returning with 17 points, 6 rebounds, and 3 steals in a 112–101 victory against the Jazz on November 29, 2013. Bledsoe scored a then-career-high 28 points in a 116–107 victory against the Sacramento Kings on December 13, 2013. Bledsoe also got his first double-double with the Suns by scoring 16 points, grabbing 11 rebounds, and putting up 7 assists in a blowout 117–90 victory over the Los Angeles Lakers on December 23, 2013.

During the third quarter of the Suns' last game of 2013 against the Clippers, Bledsoe injured his left shin. What began as a shin injury eventually turned into a meniscus injury that would leave him sidelined for nearly two and a half months. His injury was a leading factor in the Suns signing former player Leandro Barbosa back onto the team for the rest of that season. Bledsoe returned to action on March 12, 2014, against the Cleveland Cavaliers. He started for the Suns again and racked up 17 points and 10 rebounds two days later in an 87–80 victory against the Boston Celtics. He continued to start for the team throughout the rest of the season. On November 14, 2019, Bledsoe scored 31 points, setting a new NBA career high, in a 124–115 victory over the Chicago Bulls.

==== 2014–15 season ====
On June 27, 2014, the Suns extended a qualifying offer to Bledsoe, thus making him a restricted free agent. After months of deliberation and rumors concerning his future, Bledsoe and the Suns reached an agreement on a new five-year, $70 million contract on September 24, 2014. In the Suns' 2014–15 season opener against the Los Angeles Lakers on October 29, 2014, Bledsoe recorded 16 points, nine assists, and six rebounds before he drew his second technical foul and was ejected with 30 seconds left in the third quarter. Despite Bledsoe's ejection, the Suns went on to win 119–99.

On December 8, 2014, Bledsoe recorded his first career triple-double with 27 points, 11 rebounds and 16 assists in the 120–121 overtime loss to his former team, the Los Angeles Clippers. On December 23, Bledsoe recorded his second career triple-double and first one without resulting in an overtime, as he recorded 16 points, 10 rebounds and 11 assists in the 124–115 win over the Dallas Mavericks. On January 21, 2015, Bledsoe recorded a career-high 33 points, along with 10 rebounds and 6 assists, in a 118–113 victory over the Portland Trail Blazers. On February 26, 2015, Bledsoe recorded a near triple-double with 28 points on 11-of-16 shooting, 13 rebounds, and 9 assists, as well as 4 blocks and a steal in a 117–113 overtime win over the Oklahoma City Thunder. In doing so, he became just the ninth player in NBA history to record similar kinds of statistics during the regular season, as well as the first point guard to record 50% shooting for 28 or more points while recording 13 or more rebounds, 9 or more assists, 4 or more blocks, and at least one steal in a game. On March 21, he scored a career-high 34 points in a 117–102 win over the Houston Rockets.

==== 2015–16 season ====
On October 31, 2015, Bledsoe was only two points shy from tying his career-high in points scored, finishing with 33 points and 6 assists in a 101–90 win over the Portland Trail Blazers. On November 12, Bledsoe was one assist shy of recording a triple-double, finishing with 26 points, 10 rebounds and 9 assists in a 118–104 win over the Los Angeles Clippers. On December 13, in a win over the Minnesota Timberwolves, Bledsoe recorded 23 points with nine assists plus four steals and tied a career-high with four blocked shots. It was the NBA's first "four-by-four" (at least four rebounds, four assists, four steals and four blocks) by a guard since Dwyane Wade did it on February 28, 2009. On December 29, he underwent successful surgery to repair a torn meniscus in his left knee and was subsequently ruled out for the remainder of the 2015–16 season. With Bledsoe out, the Suns managed just 11 more wins over the final three months of the season.

==== 2016–17 season ====
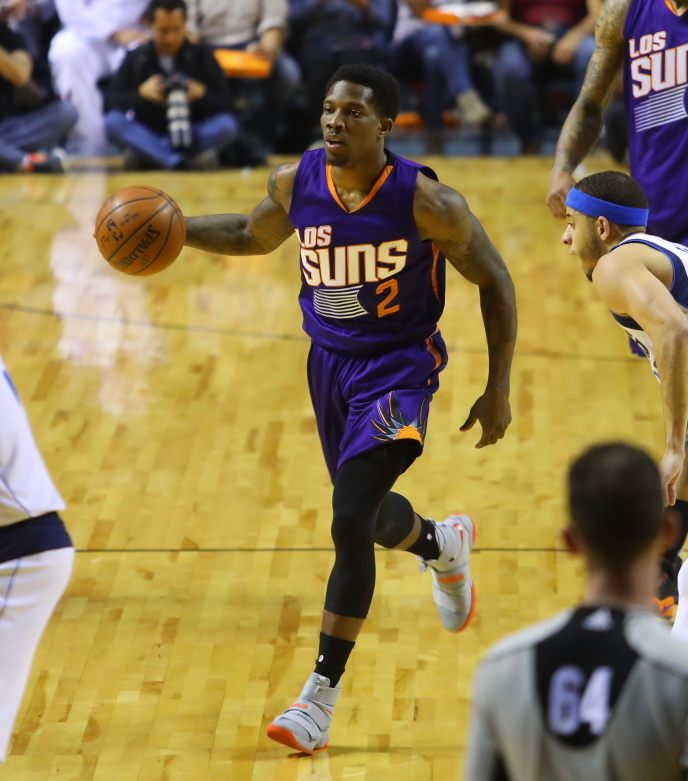
Bledsoe with the Phoenix Suns in 2017

On September 15, 2016, Bledsoe was cleared for his first five-on-five scrimmage play. He made his return to the court in the Suns' season opener on October 26 against the Sacramento Kings. In his first game since injuring his knee in December 2015, Bledsoe recorded 16 points, six rebounds, five assists and one steal in a 113–94 loss. On November 2, he scored 20 points and hit the game-winning three-pointer in overtime to give the Suns their first win of the season with a 118–115 victory over the Portland Trail Blazers. On November 27, he scored a career-high 35 points in a 120–114 loss to the Denver Nuggets. On December 13, he had a 31-point game in a 113–111 overtime win over the New York Knicks. It was his third straight 30-point game, thus becoming the first Suns player with three straight since Amar'e Stoudemire in March 2010. On December 23, Bledsoe recorded 24 points and a season-high 11 assists in a 123–116 win over the Philadelphia 76ers. On January 16, 2017, Bledsoe fell just short of his third career triple-double with 31 points, nine rebounds and nine assists in a 106–101 loss to the Utah Jazz. Six days later, he recorded a career-high 40 points and a season-high 13 assists in a 115–103 win over the Toronto Raptors. He surpassed that mark on January 28 with a 41-point effort in a 123–112 loss to Denver. Two games later on February 1, Bledsoe tied his career high with another 41-point effort in a 124–114 loss to his former team, the Los Angeles Clippers. Bledsoe's three 40-points games within 11 days is the fewest days needed to post three 40-point games in Suns history—the record was previously 13, set by Charlie Scott in 1973. In the Suns' last game before the 2017 NBA All-Star Weekend, on February 15, Bledsoe recorded his third career triple-double with 25 points, 10 rebounds, and 13 assists in a 137–101 win over the Los Angeles Lakers. On March 15, he was shut down for the remainder of the season after battling knee soreness. He finished with career highs in points and assists.

==== 2017–18 season ====
On October 22, 2017, just three games into the season, Bledsoe tweeted out "I Dont wanna be here", which Suns general manager Ryan McDonough took as a slight against the organization and dismissed him from playing with the team. Bledsoe claimed that the tweet referred to being in a hair salon. On November 5, 2017, Bledsoe was fined $10,000 by the NBA for his tweet. That same day, it was reported that Bledsoe would return to Suns team facilities to work out with staff members.

=== Milwaukee Bucks (2017–2020) ===
On November 7, 2017, Bledsoe was traded to the Milwaukee Bucks in exchange for Greg Monroe and a protected first and second-round draft pick. He made his debut for the Bucks three days later, recording 13 points and seven assists in a 94–87 win over the San Antonio Spurs. On November 22, in his return to Phoenix, Bledsoe scored 30 points in a 113–107 overtime win over the Suns. On March 30, 2018, he scored 39 points in a 124–122 overtime win over the Los Angeles Lakers. On April 9, 2018, he had his fourth career triple-double with 20 points, 12 rebounds and 11 assists in a 102–86 win over the Orlando Magic.

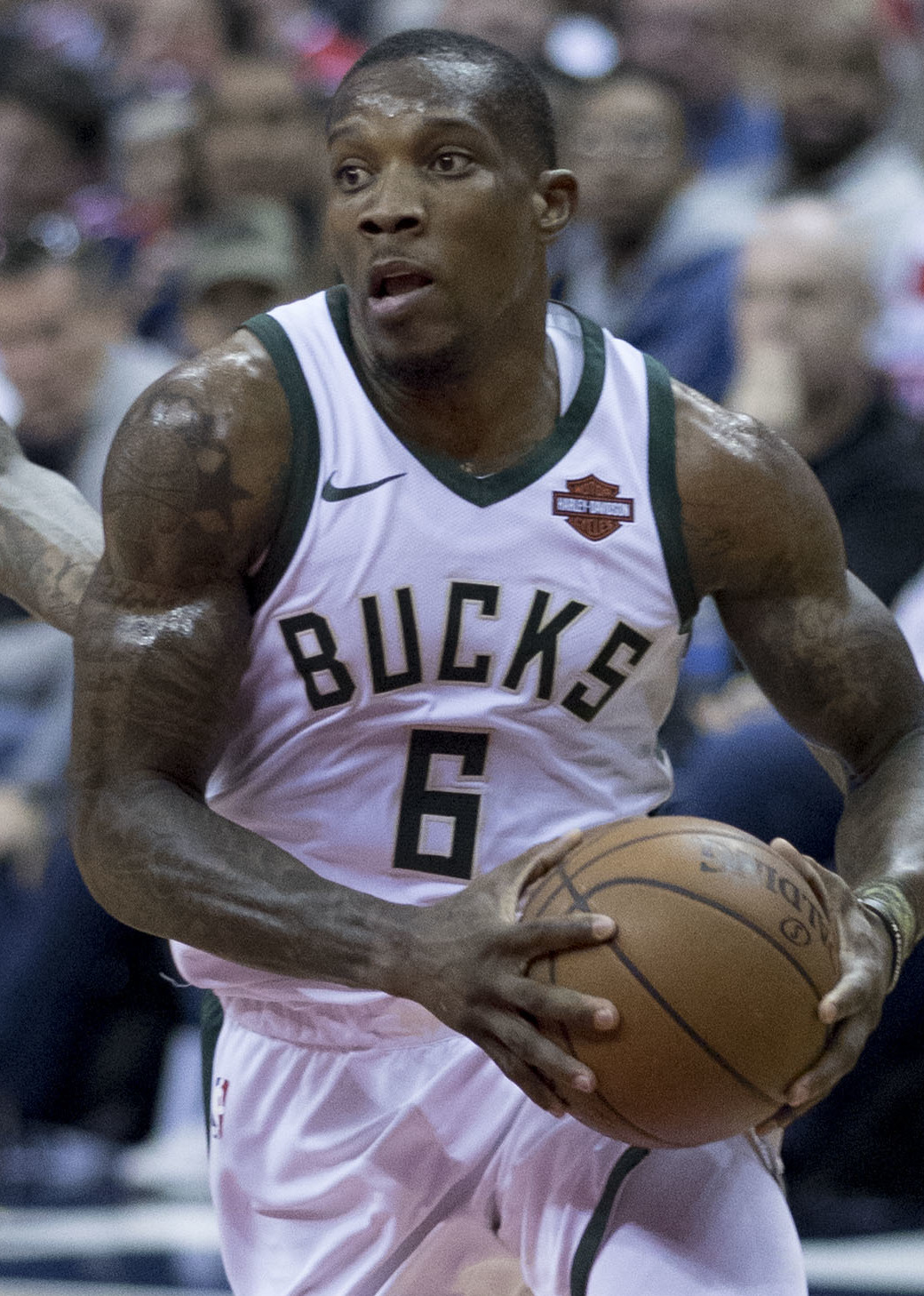
Bledsoe in January 2018.

On January 19, 2019, Bledsoe scored 30 points in a 118–108 win over the Magic. On February 27, he recorded 26 points, 13 assists and 12 rebounds in a 141–140 overtime win over the Sacramento Kings. On March 1, he scored 31 points in a 131–120 win over the Lakers. On March 4, he signed a four-year, $70 million contract extension with the Bucks. At the season's end, he was named to the NBA All-Defensive First Team. On December 14, 2019, the Milwaukee Bucks announced that Bledsoe had suffered from a right fibula avulsion fracture during a 127–114 seasons win over the Memphis Grizzlies and was expected to be sidelined for about two weeks. Bledsoe helped the Bucks capture the best record in the league for the second consecutive season, however Milwaukee once again failed to appear in the NBA Finals, losing to the eventual Eastern Conference champion Miami Heat in five games in the Semi-Finals, with Bledsoe missing Game 1 due to a hamstring injury.

=== New Orleans Pelicans (2020–2021) ===
On November 24, 2020, Bledsoe was traded, along with two future first round picks and two pick swap rights, to the New Orleans Pelicans for Jrue Holiday as part of a deal also involving the Oklahoma City Thunder and Denver Nuggets. In his debut with the Pelicans, Bledsoe recorded 18 points, two rebounds and six assists in a 113–99 win over the Toronto Raptors.

=== Return to Los Angeles (2021–2022) ===
On August 7, 2021, Bledsoe was traded along with Steven Adams, the draft rights to Ziaire Williams and Jared Butler, and a 2022 protected first round pick to the Memphis Grizzlies in a three team deal with the Charlotte Hornets. The Pelicans received Jonas Valančiūnas and the draft rights to Trey Murphy III and Brandon Boston Jr. from Memphis. On August 16, Bledsoe was then traded to the Los Angeles Clippers for Patrick Beverley, Rajon Rondo, and Daniel Oturu. On October 21, 2021, Bledsoe suited up as a Clipper for the first time since 2013, recording 22 points, along with 3 steals, in a 115–113 loss to the Golden State Warriors.

On February 4, 2022, Bledsoe was traded, alongside Keon Johnson, Justise Winslow and a 2025 second-round pick, to the Portland Trail Blazers in exchange for Norman Powell and Robert Covington. In Portland, he reunited with Trail Blazers coach Chauncey Billups, whom he was teammates with during the 2011–12 NBA season with the Clippers. On March 28, Bledsoe was ruled out for the remainder of the season with pain in his left Achilles tendon. He was waived on July 6, having never played a game as a member of the team.

=== Shanghai Sharks (2022–2025) ===
On November 19, 2022, Bledsoe signed with the Shanghai Sharks of the Chinese Basketball Association.

== Career statistics ==
Legend
GP	Games played	GS	Games started	MPG	Minutes per game
FG%	Field goal percentage	3P%	3-point field goal percentage	FT%	Free throw percentage
RPG	Rebounds per game	APG	Assists per game	SPG	Steals per game
BPG	Blocks per game	PPG	Points per game	**Bold**	Career high

=== NBA ===
==== Regular season ====
Year	Team	GP	GS	MPG	FG%	3P%	FT%	RPG	APG	SPG	BPG	PPG
2010–11	L.A. Clippers	**81**	25	22.7	.424	.276	.744	2.8	3.6	1.1	.3	6.7
2011–12	L.A. Clippers	40	1	11.6	.389	.200	.636	1.6	1.7	.8	.4	3.3
2012–13	L.A. Clippers	76	12	20.4	.445	**.397**	.791	3.0	3.1	1.4	**.7**	8.5
2013–14	Phoenix	43	40	32.9	.477	.357	.772	4.7	5.5	1.6	.3	17.7
2014–15	Phoenix	**81**	**81**	**34.6**	.447	.324	.800	**5.2**	6.1	1.6	.6	17.0
2015–16	Phoenix	31	31	34.2	.453	.372	.802	4.0	6.1	**2.0**	.6	20.4
2016–17	Phoenix	66	66	33.0	.434	.335	**.847**	4.8	**6.3**	1.4	.5	**21.1**
2017–18	Phoenix	3	3	27.7	.400	.308	.786	2.3	3.0	1.3	**.7**	15.7
2017–18	Milwaukee	71	71	31.5	.476	.349	.795	3.9	5.1	**2.0**	.6	17.8
2018–19	Milwaukee	78	78	29.1	**.484**	.329	.750	4.6	5.5	1.5	.4	15.9
2019–20	Milwaukee	61	61	27.0	.475	.344	.790	4.6	5.4	.9	.4	14.9
2020–21	New Orleans	71	70	29.7	.421	.341	.687	3.4	3.8	.8	.3	12.2
2021–22	L.A. Clippers	54	29	25.2	.421	.313	.761	3.4	4.2	1.3	.4	9.9
Career		756	568	27.8	.452	.336	.784	3.9	4.7	1.4	.5	13.7

==== Playoffs ====
Year	Team	GP	GS	MPG	FG%	3P%	FT%	RPG	APG	SPG	BPG	PPG
2012	L.A. Clippers	11	0	17.2	**.587**	**.429**	.625	2.4	2.1	**1.2**	.4	7.9
2013	L.A. Clippers	6	0	16.2	.500	.111	.667	2.5	3.0	.3	.5	6.5
2018	Milwaukee	7	7	**32.1**	.440	.318	.700	3.4	3.7	1.0	**.9**	13.6
2019	Milwaukee	**15**	**15**	28.3	.411	.236	.706	3.7	4.3	1.1	.4	**13.7**
2020	Milwaukee	9	9	29.7	.388	.250	**.808**	**4.6**	**5.9**	**1.2**	.7	11.7
Career		48	31	25.0	.441	.254	.712	3.4	3.8	1.0	.5	11.1

=== College ===
Year	Team	GP	GS	MPG	FG%	3P%	FT%	RPG	APG	SPG	BPG	PPG
2009–10	Kentucky	37	35	30.3	.462	.383	.667	3.1	2.9	1.4	.3	11.3

== Personal life ==
Bledsoe's mother, Maureen Reddick, worked several jobs and raised three children on her own in Birmingham, Alabama. Bledsoe has five children: sons Ethan and Emory and daughters Eriauna, Norah, and Noor.

On October 27, 2022, Bledsoe was arrested in Lost Hills, California on misdemeanor charges of domestic violence.

On June 18, 2025, Bledsoe was arrested near Los Angeles, California after allegedly striking a woman in the face.
