= Vinny Del Negro =

American basketball player and coach (born 1966)

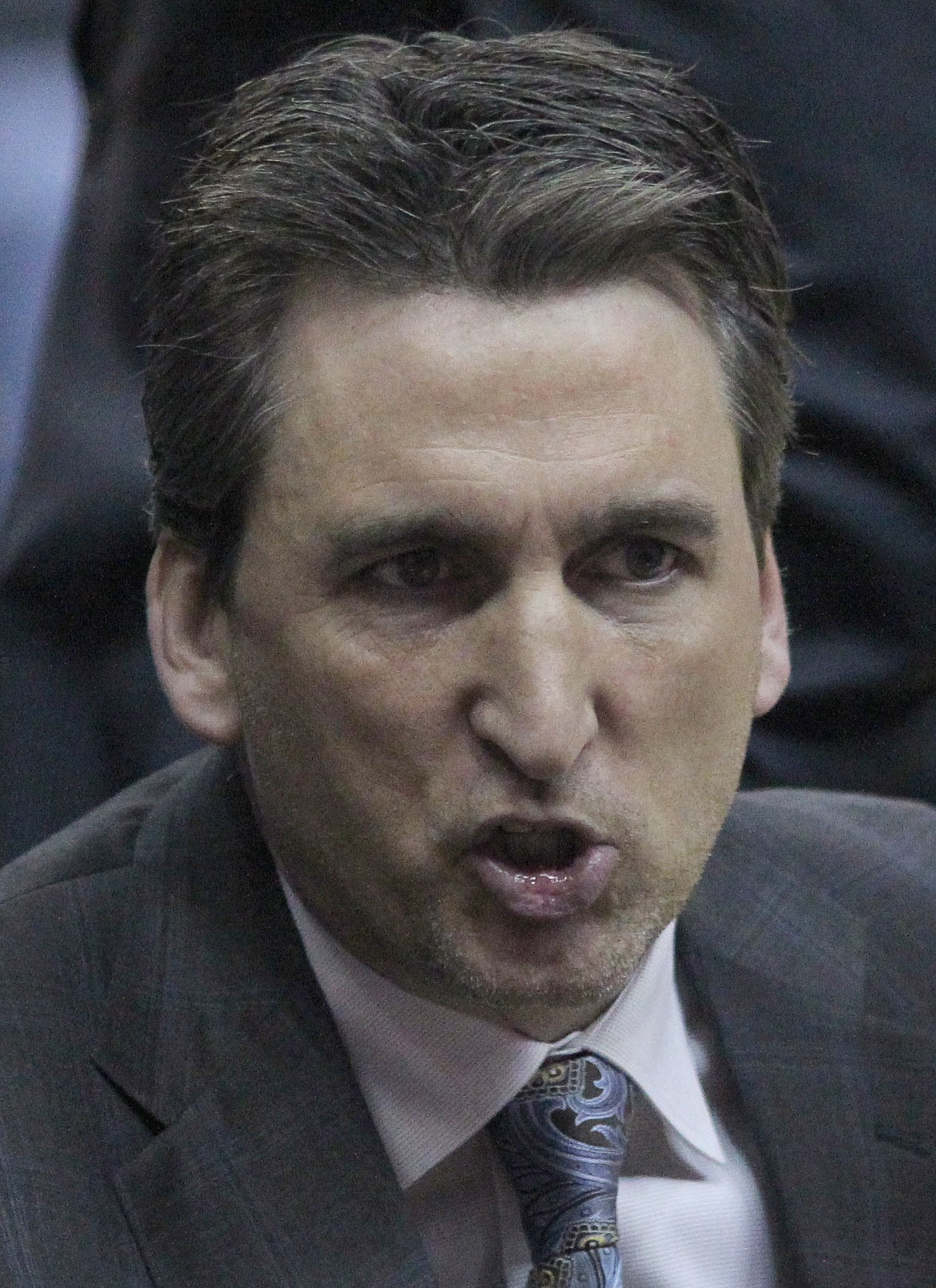
- Del Negro in 2011

Personal information
- Born: August 9, 1966 (age 60) Springfield, Massachusetts, U.S.
- Listed height: 6 ft 4 in (1.93 m)
- Listed weight: 189 lb (86 kg)

Career information
- High school: Cathedral (Springfield, Massachusetts); Suffield Academy (Suffield, Connecticut)
- College: NC State (1984–1988)
- NBA draft: 1988: 2nd round, 29th overall pick
- Drafted by: Sacramento Kings
- Playing career: 1988–2001
- Position: Point guard / shooting guard
- Number: 15, 8
- Coaching career: 2008–2013

Career history

Playing
- 1988–1990: Sacramento Kings
- 1990–1992: Benetton Treviso
- 1992–1998: San Antonio Spurs
- 1999: Teamsystem Bologna
- 1999–2000: Milwaukee Bucks
- 2000–2001: Golden State Warriors
- 2001: Phoenix Suns

Coaching
- 2008–2010: Chicago Bulls
- 2010–2013: Los Angeles Clippers

Career highlights
- Italian League champion (1992); First-team All-ACC (1988); No. 14 jersey honored by NC State Wolfpack

Career NBA statistics
- Points: 7,038 (9.1 ppg)
- Rebounds: 1,810 (2.3 rpg)
- Assists: 2,484 (3.2 apg)
- Stats at NBA.com
- Stats at Basketball Reference

Vincent Joseph Del Negro (born August 9, 1966) is an American former professional basketball player. He was the head coach of the National Basketball Association's Chicago Bulls from 2008 to 2010, and the Los Angeles Clippers from 2010 to 2013. Del Negro is currently an analyst with NBA TV.

== Early life ==
Del Negro was born on August 9, 1966, in Springfield, Massachusetts. His father, Vince, was a two-time junior college All-American, and taught his son to play basketball at a young age. Vinny made the varsity basketball team during his freshman year at Cathedral High School. He caught the attention of Dennis Kinne, the basketball coach at Suffield Academy, who persuaded him to attend Suffield Academy so that he could play basketball for them. Vinny led Suffield Academy to two New England championships. He scored 1,116 points, becoming Suffield Academy's all-time leading scorer.

== College career ==
Del Negro played for Jim Valvano at North Carolina State University. As a senior, he was selected to the All-Atlantic Coast Conference team after averaging 15.9 points, 3.6 assists and 4.9 rebounds per game. In his junior season, Del Negro led the Wolfpack to the 1987 ACC Tournament championship and was named tournament MVP.

== Professional career ==
Del Negro was selected by the Sacramento Kings with the 29th pick in the 1988 NBA draft. He would play two seasons there before leaving for Italy and Benetton Treviso for another two years (he won the Italian championship in 1992 with over 25 points per game).

Upon his return to the NBA in 1992, Del Negro joined the San Antonio Spurs where he would play for the next six years. During the 1996 NBA Playoffs, Del Negro averaged a career-high 14.3 points a game. In early 1999, he played four games in Italy for Teamsystem Bologna, before signing with the Milwaukee Bucks, where he played in the 1998–99 and 1999–2000 seasons. Del Negro was traded to the Golden State Warriors in a three-team deal that also involved the Cleveland Cavaliers in June 2000. In January 2001 he was traded to the Phoenix Suns, and was traded to the Los Angeles Clippers in a three-team deal with the Orlando Magic in November, although he would never play for them, and subsequently retired.

Del Negro's career statistics included averaging 9.1 points, 2.3 rebounds, and 3.2 assists per game, while shooting 47.5% from the field and 84.0% from the free-throw line.

== NBA career statistics ==
Legend
| GP | Games played | GS | Games started | MPG | Minutes per game |
| FG% | Field goal percentage | 3P% | 3-point field goal percentage | FT% | Free throw percentage |
| RPG | Rebounds per game | APG | Assists per game | SPG | Steals per game |
| BPG | Blocks per game | PPG | Points per game | **Bold** | Career high |
| * | Led the league |

=== Regular season ===
| Year | Team | GP | GS | MPG | FG% | 3P% | FT% | RPG | APG | SPG | BPG | PPG |
|---|---|---|---|---|---|---|---|---|---|---|---|---|
| 1988–89 | Sacramento | 80 | 2 | 19.5 | .475 | .300 | .850 | 2.1 | 2.6 | 0.8 | **0.2** | 7.1 |
| 1989–90 | Sacramento | 76 | 29 | 24.4 | .462 | .313 | .871 | 2.6 | 3.3 | 0.8 | 0.1 | 9.7 |
| 1992–93 | San Antonio | 73 | 31 | 20.9 | .507 | .250 | .863 | 2.2 | 4.0 | 0.6 | 0.0 | 7.4 |
| 1993–94 | San Antonio | 77 | 56 | 25.3 | .487 | .349 | .824 | 2.1 | **4.2** | 0.8 | 0.0 | 10.0 |
| 1994–95 | San Antonio | 75 | 71 | 31.5 | .486 | .407 | .790 | 2.6 | 3.0 | 0.8 | **0.2** | 12.5 |
| 1995–96 | San Antonio | **82** | **82*** | **33.7** | .497 | .380 | .832 | **3.3** | 3.8 | **1.0** | 0.1 | **14.5** |
| 1996–97 | San Antonio | 72 | 53 | 31.2 | .467 | .314 | .868 | 2.9 | 3.2 | 0.8 | 0.1 | 12.3 |
| 1997–98 | San Antonio | 54 | 38 | 31.9 | .441 | **.436** | .796 | 2.8 | 3.4 | 0.7 | 0.1 | 9.5 |
| 1998–99 | Milwaukee | 48 | 7 | 22.8 | .422 | .433 | .800 | 2.1 | 3.6 | 0.7 | 0.1 | 5.9 |
| 1999–00 | Milwaukee | 67 | 0 | 18.1 | .471 | .333 | .897 | 1.6 | 2.4 | 0.5 | 0.0 | 5.2 |
| 2000–01 | Golden State | 29 | 1 | 13.7 | .333 | .111 | **1.000** | 1.1 | 2.1 | 0.2 | 0.0 | 2.7 |
| 2000–01 | Phoenix | 36 | 0 | 14.6 | **.528** | .000 | .893 | 1.4 | 1.8 | 0.6 | 0.1 | 4.9 |
| 2001–02 | Phoenix | 2 | 0 | 3.0 | .250 | .000 | .000 | 0.0 | 1.0 | 0.0 | 0.0 | 1.0 |
| Career | | 771 | 370 | 24.9 | .475 | .359 | .840 | 2.3 | 3.2 | 0.7 | 0.1 | 9.1 |

=== Playoffs ===
| Year | Team | GP | GS | MPG | FG% | 3P% | FT% | RPG | APG | SPG | BPG | PPG |
|---|---|---|---|---|---|---|---|---|---|---|---|---|
| 1992–93 | San Antonio | 8 | 0 | 14.0 | .447 | .222 | **1.000** | 2.4 | 3.0 | 0.1 | 0.1 | 5.0 |
| 1993–94 | San Antonio | 4 | 4 | 23.3 | .444 | .500 | .600 | 1.8 | **4.5** | 0.3 | 0.0 | 7.3 |
| 1994–95 | San Antonio | **15** | **15** | 25.5 | .432 | .450 | .833 | 2.1 | 2.5 | 0.5 | 0.1 | 8.7 |
| 1995–96 | San Antonio | 10 | 10 | **37.9** | .460 | **.593** | .684 | 2.6 | 2.9 | **1.3** | **0.3** | **14.3** |
| 1997–98 | San Antonio | 9 | 3 | 31.4 | .481 | .200 | .941 | **2.7** | 3.2 | 0.9 | 0.0 | 10.7 |
| 1999–00 | Milwaukee | 5 | 0 | 18.6 | .433 | .000 | .000 | 1.6 | 1.8 | 0.6 | 0.0 | 5.2 |
| 2000–01 | Phoenix | 3 | 0 | 8.7 | **.571** | .000 | .000 | 0.7 | 1.7 | 0.0 | 0.0 | 2.7 |
| Career | | 54 | 32 | 25.3 | .454 | .431 | .812 | 2.2 | 2.8 | 0.6 | 0.1 | 8.8 |

== Coaching career ==
Del Negro worked as a radio commentator for the Phoenix Suns before being promoted to director of player personnel for the Suns in 2006. In 2007, the Suns promoted him to the position of assistant general manager.

=== Chicago Bulls (2008-2010) ===
On June 9, 2008, multiple media reports indicated Del Negro had agreed to become the new head coach of the Chicago Bulls. He became the favorite for the job after former Bulls' coach Doug Collins withdrew his name from consideration.

Two days later, Del Negro was officially introduced as the new head coach of the Bulls, replacing Jim Boylan and becoming the 17th head coach in Bulls' history.

Del Negro finished his first season as head coach of the Chicago Bulls with a 41–41 record, sufficient for the seventh seed in the Eastern Conference. The Bulls played a seven-game series against the Boston Celtics, featuring four overtime games with a total of a record seven overtime periods, before losing.

Del Negro finished his second season as head coach of the Chicago Bulls with a 41–41 record, sufficient for the eighth seed in the Eastern Conference. The Bulls lost the best of seven series in five games against the Cleveland Cavaliers.

The Bulls announced Del Negro's dismissal on May 4, 2010.

=== Los Angeles Clippers (2010-2013) ===
On July 6, 2010, multiple league sources confirmed that Del Negro would become the next head coach of the Los Angeles Clippers. At the end of Del Negro's first season with the Clippers, the Clippers finished with a record of 32–50, missing the playoffs. Despite missing the playoffs, the Clippers did have the NBA Rookie of the Year, Blake Griffin. Del Negro and Clippers followed up this mediocre season by acquiring All-Star point guard Chris Paul and finishing fifth in the Western Conference with a record of 40–26, one game shy of the division leading Los Angeles Lakers. The Clippers advanced to the second round of the playoffs for only the second time since they moved to Los Angeles in 1984.

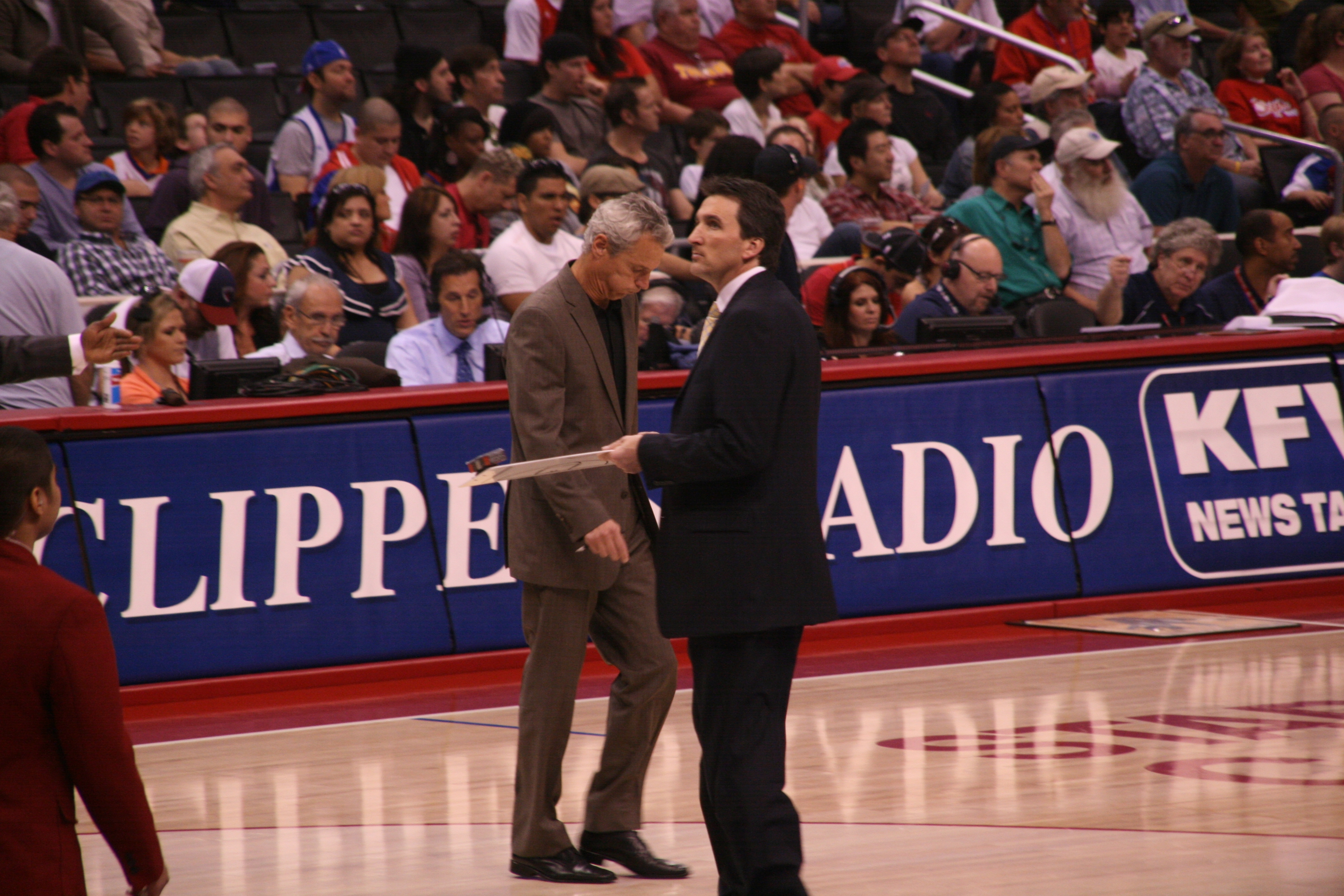
Del Negro coaching the Clippers in 2011

A year later, Del Negro led the Clippers to the best season in the franchise's 43-year history. The Clippers notched a franchise-record 17-game winning streak, including a perfect 16–0 mark in December. They won a franchise-record 56 games, their first 50-win season ever, as well as their first Pacific Division title. The title was clinched after defeating the Lakers on April 7, which also completed a season sweep of their crosstown rivals, 4–0. The franchise had not swept the Lakers since 1974–75, when the Clippers were the Buffalo Braves. It was also the first time in 20 years since 1992–93 that the Clippers won the season series against the Lakers. However, the Clippers lost in the first round of the playoffs to the Memphis Grizzlies, 4–2, after winning the first two games.

On May 21, 2013, it was announced that the Clippers would not renew Del Negro's contract after its expiration at the end of June. At times during the season, he was criticized for his player rotations. Del Negro had a 128–102 regular-season record in three seasons with the club, and his .557 winning percentage was the highest in club history. He was only the second coach to leave the Clippers with a winning record. (Note: Larry Brown was the first in 1993.) However, much of the club's success was credited to Paul and Griffin. According to Yahoo! Sports and CBSSports.com, Paul, who was scheduled to become a free agent in the offseason, did not support Del Negro's return. Del Negro felt that Paul had "a lot of say-so" in the team's decisions, and Clippers owner Donald Sterling said he needed to be supportive of the team's star players. Paul was upset that he was being blamed, and the Clippers later denied any player involvement in the coaching decision.

== Personal life ==
Del Negro is of Italian ancestry. His father, Vince, played basketball at the University of Kentucky under legendary coach Adolph Rupp. Del Negro won the 2021 American Century Championship. He is the second cousin of actor Matthew Del Negro.

== Head coaching record ==
Legend
| Regular season | G | Games coached | W | Games won | L | Games lost | W–L % | Win–loss % |
| Playoffs | PG | Playoff games | PW | Playoff wins | PL | Playoff losses | PW–L % | Playoff win–loss % |

| Team | Year | G | W | L | W–L% | Finish | PG | PW | PL | PW–L% | Result |
|---|---|---|---|---|---|---|---|---|---|---|---|
| Chicago | 2008–09 | 82 | 41 | 41 | .500 | 2nd in Central | 7 | 3 | 4 | .429 | Lost in First round |
| Chicago | 2009–10 | 82 | 41 | 41 | .500 | 3rd in Central | 5 | 1 | 4 | .200 | Lost in First round |
| L.A. Clippers | 2010–11 | 82 | 32 | 50 | .390 | 4th in Pacific | — | — | — | — | Missed playoffs |
| L.A. Clippers | 2011–12 | 66 | 40 | 26 | .606 | 2nd in Pacific | 11 | 4 | 7 | .364 | Lost in Conference semifinals |
| L.A. Clippers | 2012–13 | 82 | 56 | 26 | .683 | 1st in Pacific | 6 | 2 | 4 | .333 | Lost in First round |
| Career | | 394 | 210 | 184 | .533 | | 29 | 10 | 19 | .345 | |
