= 2012–13 Los Angeles Lakers season =

NBA professional basketball team season

- Head coach: Mike Brown (fired); Bernie Bickerstaff (interim); Mike D'Antoni
- President: Jim Buss (vice)
- General manager: Mitch Kupchak
- Owners: Jerry Buss (until February 18, his death); Jerry Buss family trust
- Arena: Staples Center

Results
- Record: 45–37 (.549)
- Place: Division: 3rd (Pacific); Conference: 7th (Western)
- Playoff finish: First Round (lost to Spurs 0–4)
- Stats at Basketball Reference

Local media
- Television: TWC SportsNet and TWC Deportes
- Radio: 710 ESPN

The 2012–13 Los Angeles Lakers season was the 65th season of the franchise, its 64th season in the National Basketball Association (NBA), and its 53rd season in Los Angeles. The Lakers acquired All-Stars Steve Nash and Dwight Howard, giving them a starting lineup of five All-Stars consisting of Kobe Bryant, Pau Gasol, Metta World Peace, Nash, and Howard, who were expected to contend for the franchise's 17th NBA championship. Instead, the Lakers struggled to qualify for the playoffs after changing head coaches and implementing multiple offenses. However, a weak defense and multiple injuries were the team's biggest problems. They exited the playoffs in the first round for the first time since 2007. Additionally, this was the first season since 2006-07 without longtime point guard Derek Fisher, who had helped the team win its last five championships. Widely regarded as a failed superteam mainly due to injuries, the Lakers started out the season as a top 2 favorite to win the championship (the other team being the defending champions Miami Heat who ended up repeating) and the Lakers were projected to win 58 games. The Lakers were also the top favorite to win the Western Conference.

The season began with head coach Mike Brown changing the Lakers offensive strategy to the Princeton offense. After an 0–8 preseason record and a 1–4 start to the regular season, Brown was fired. Assistant Bernie Bickerstaff was named the interim coach until Mike D'Antoni took over as the full-time head coach. Still, the Lakers began the season 15–21 for their worst start since the 1993–94 season. They were in jeopardy of missing the playoffs after trailing the Houston Rockets at the All-Star break by 3 1/2 games for the eighth and final playoff berth in the Western Conference. The Lakers started 8–2 after the break, gaining sole possession of a top-8 spot for the first time since December 1, and moving two games over .500 for the first time all season. After being swept by their crosstown rivals, the Los Angeles Clippers, the Lakers fell a half game behind the Utah Jazz for the final playoff spot. The Lakers again overtook Utah in the standings, but Kobe Bryant's season ended after suffering a torn Achilles tendon in the 80th game of the season. The Lakers qualified for the playoffs on the last day of the season, defeating Houston to finish 45–37 and seeded seventh in the West. Facing the San Antonio Spurs in the first round, the injury-riddled Lakers were swept in four games to the eventual Western Conference champion. It was also the second time in three years that the Lakers were swept in the playoffs, having been swept by the eventual champion Dallas Mavericks in the 2011 Conference semifinals.

This was the last season that the Lakers made the playoffs until the 2019–20 season when the franchise won its 17th championship. As a result, they would miss the playoffs for six consecutive seasons before 2020, marking their longest playoff drought in franchise history. Prior to 2013, they missed the playoffs for a total of just 5 seasons.

== Key dates ==
- June 28: The 2012 NBA draft took place at Prudential Center in Newark, New Jersey.
- July 11: The Lakers acquired two-time MVP Steve Nash for first round-picks in 2013 and 2015 and second-round picks in 2013 and 2014.
- August 10: The Lakers acquired three-time DPOY Dwight Howard, F/C Earl Clark, and PG Chris Duhon in a four-team multi-player trade also involving C Andrew Bynum, F Josh McRoberts, and G/F Christian Eyenga.
- October 21: Dwight Howard made his Laker debut in a preseason loss to the Sacramento Kings.
- October 30: The Lakers opened the 2012–13 NBA season, losing to the Dallas Mavericks 91–99.
- December 28: The Lakers retired the number 52 jersey of Jamaal Wilkes during halftime of their game against the Portland Trail Blazers. The Lakers won the game by a score of 104–87.
- April 2: The Lakers retired the number 34 jersey of Shaquille O'Neal during halftime of their game against the Dallas Mavericks. The Lakers won the game by a score of 101–81.

== Draft picks ==
Round	Pick	Player	Position	Nationality	College/Team
2	55	Darius Johnson-Odom	SG	United States	Marquette
2	60	Robert Sacre	C	Canada	Gonzaga

== Roster ==
2012–13 Los Angeles Lakers roster
Players

Pos.	No.	Player	Height	Weight	DOB	From
G	5	Steve Blake	6 ft 3 in (1.91 m)	172 lb (78 kg)	1980–02–26	Maryland
G	24	Kobe Bryant	6 ft 6 in (1.98 m)	205 lb (93 kg)	1978–08–23	Lower Merion HS (PA)
F	6	Earl Clark	6 ft 10 in (2.08 m)	225 lb (102 kg)	1988–01–17	Louisville
G	21	Chris Duhon	6 ft 1 in (1.85 m)	190 lb (86 kg)	1982–08–31	Duke
F	3	Devin Ebanks	6 ft 9 in (2.06 m)	215 lb (98 kg)	1989–10–28	West Virginia
F/C	16	Pau Gasol	7 ft 0 in (2.13 m)	250 lb (113 kg)	1980–07–06	Spain
G	0	Andrew Goudelock	6 ft 3 in (1.91 m)	200 lb (91 kg)	1988-12-07	College of Charleston
C	27	Jordan Hill	6 ft 10 in (2.08 m)	235 lb (107 kg)	1987–07–27	Arizona
C	12	Dwight Howard	6 ft 11 in (2.11 m)	265 lb (120 kg)	1985–12–08	SW Atlanta Academy (GA)
F	4	Antawn Jamison	6 ft 9 in (2.06 m)	235 lb (107 kg)	1976–06–12	North Carolina
G	20	Jodie Meeks	6 ft 4 in (1.93 m)	208 lb (94 kg)	1987–08–21	Kentucky
G	1	Darius Morris	6 ft 4 in (1.93 m)	190 lb (86 kg)	1991–01–03	Michigan
G	10	Steve Nash	6 ft 3 in (1.91 m)	178 lb (81 kg)	1974–02–07	Santa Clara
C	50	Robert Sacre	7 ft 0 in (2.13 m)	260 lb (118 kg)	1989–06–06	Gonzaga
F	15	Metta World Peace	6 ft 7 in (2.01 m)	260 lb (118 kg)	1979–11–13	St. John's

Coaches
Head coach
- Mike Brown (fired)
- Bernie Bickerstaff (interim)
- Mike D'Antoni
Assistant(s)
- Bernie Bickerstaff
- Dan D'Antoni
- Chuck Person
- Darvin Ham
- Eddie Jordan
- Steve Clifford

Legend
- (DP) Unsigned draft pick
- (FA) Free agent
- (S) Suspended
- (DL) On assignment to D-League affiliate
- Injured

Roster
Updated: 2013-04–12

== Offseason ==
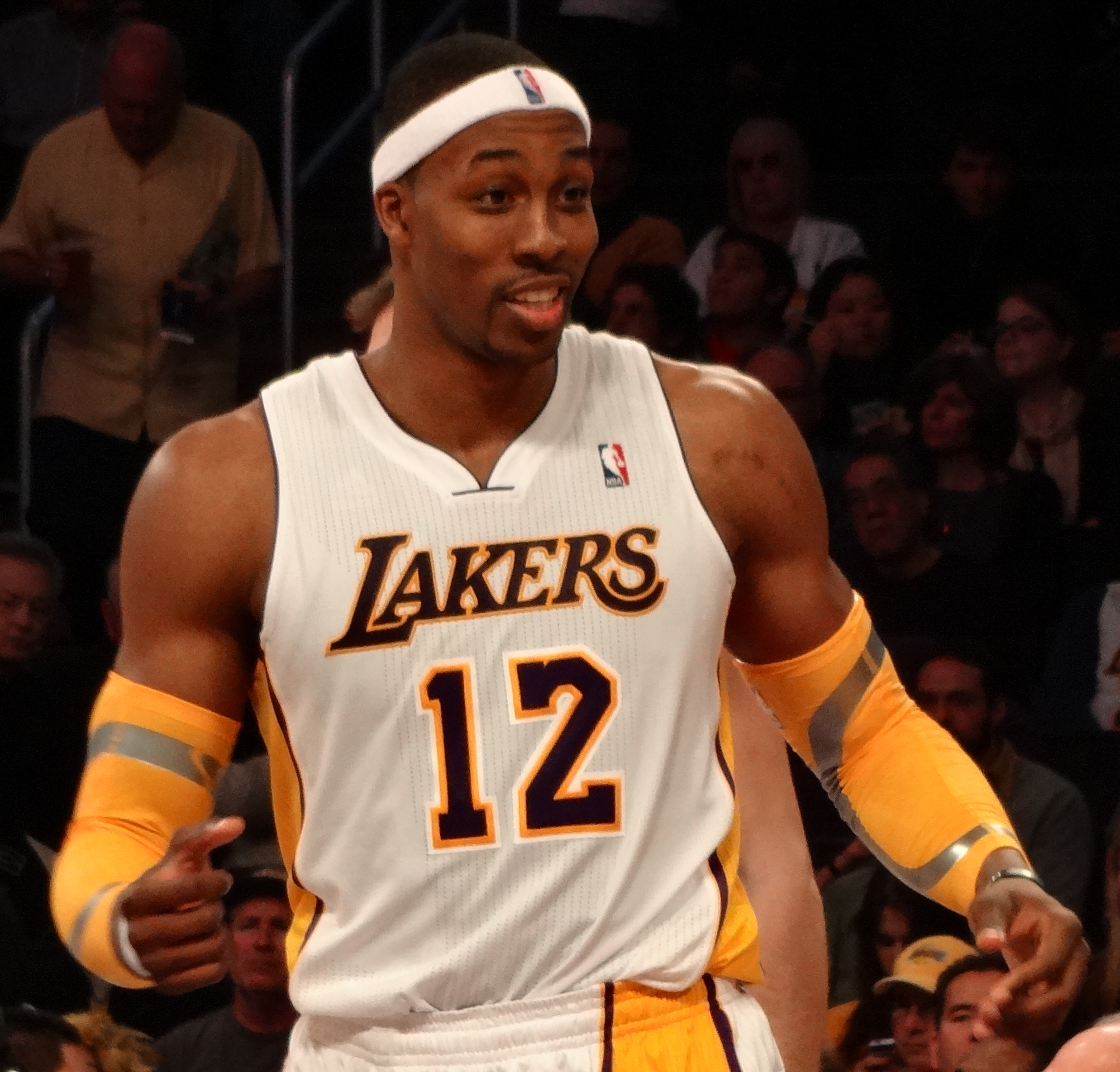
The Lakers traded for Dwight Howard before the season.

After being eliminated from the playoffs in the second round in the prior two seasons, the Lakers traded for three-time Defensive Player of the Year Dwight Howard and two-time Most Valuable Player (MVP) Steve Nash. It was the fourth time in league history that a team acquired two players with at least six All-Star selections. Both players were widely considered to be future Hall of Famers. They joined an already strong Lakers nucleus in Kobe Bryant, Pau Gasol, and Metta World Peace. The center Howard made the team younger and more athletic; his acquisition appeared to be the start of a new dynasty for the Lakers. In Nash, the Lakers had their first elite point guard in decades. The trio of Bryant, Howard, and Nash was expected to rival the defending league champion Miami Heat's combination of LeBron James, Dwyane Wade and Chris Bosh. Additionally, the Lakers re-signed key role player Jordan Hill and signed free agent veteran Antawn Jamison and shooting specialist Jodie Meeks.

Coach Mike Brown began installing the Princeton offense, a decision he made even before the July acquisition of Nash. He thought of using the offense the previous season, but the lockout impacted the schedule, making it too hectic to implement. New assistant coach Eddie Jordan was hired to install the Lakers third offense in three years after the triangle offense during coach Phil Jackson's tenure and Brown's own offense the previous season.

Despite the addition of Howard and Nash, Bryant insisted he remained the leader of the Lakers. Nash agreed that it was Bryant's team, but added the team needed to provide support. Bryant looked forward to Nash running the team's offense. Bryant envisioned that after he retired, Howard would assume the role of team leader. Howard anticipated Bryant being tough on him. "So, I'll take all the heat that he's going to give me because I know at the end of the day that's going to make me a better player and a better person and it's going to make this team better", Howard said. In 2014, Nash said that "everyone could see [the relationship between Bryant and Howard] was going to be tough from the start."

== Season summary ==
=== Struggles with Princeton offense ===
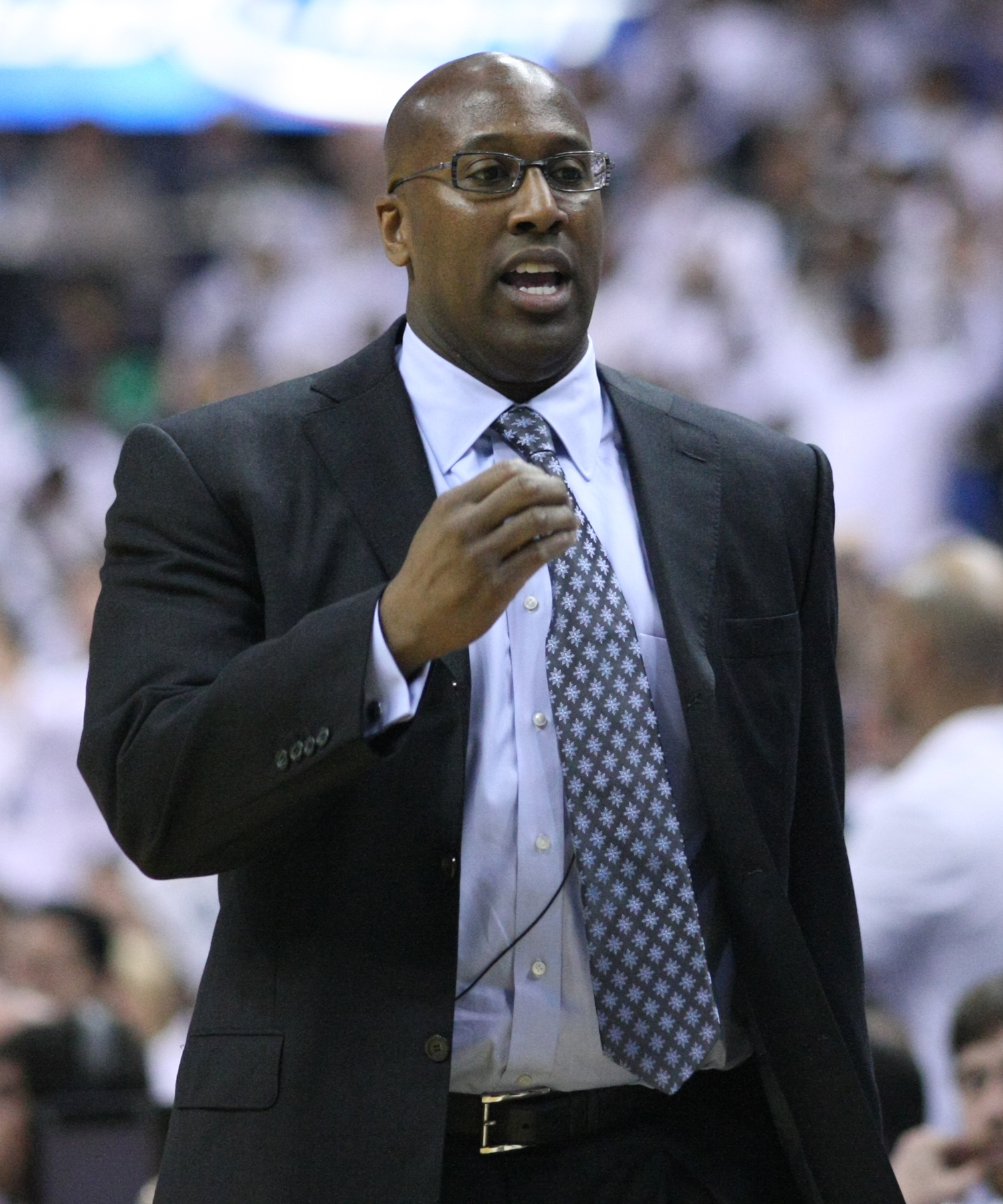
Head coach Mike Brown was fired after a 1–4 start.

Howard had back surgery earlier in April, and the Lakers had acquired him with the possibility that he might be out until December or January. He did not play basketball until training camp in October. The Lakers went a winless 0–8 in the preseason with Howard playing in just two of the games while he was still recovering. Brown estimated it could take until January for the Lakers to fully master the new offense. The Lakers starting lineup at the start of the regular season was both the league's tallest and its oldest with Nash (38 years old), Bryant (34), Gasol and World Peace (32), and Howard (26). The five All-Stars had a combined 33 All-Star appearances, and the team had the league's highest payroll at just over $100 million. The New York Times called them "one of the most talented lineups in NBA history." ESPN wrote that the Lakers were "not only expected to win the title but to do so in record-breaking fashion." Bryant cautioned that they were not "the most athletic team in the world" and could be limited in their rebounding and transition game. Howard was ready for the start of the season, but he was still recovering from his back surgery. In his Laker debut, Howard had 19 points and 10 rebounds, but he was only 3-for-14 on free throws and fouled out; the Lakers lost 99–91.

Bryant said patience was needed as the team adjusted to the Princeton offense. He endorsed the new scheme, comparing it to the triangle offense's ball-sharing principles as well as its difficult learning curve. The Lakers fell to the Los Angeles Clippers 105–95 in a "home" game, and they started the season 0–3 for the first time since 34 years ago in 1978 and just the fourth time in franchise history. Bryant scored 40 points in the loss with two steals, and he passed Magic Johnson (1,724) as the Lakers career leader in steals. Nash did not play after suffering a non-displaced fracture in his left leg in the previous game, and he was expected to miss at least a week. The Lakers beat the Detroit Pistons 108–79 for their first win, and avoided their first 0–4 start since 1957. However, after a 1–4 start, Brown was fired as head coach. The team was still adjusting to the new offense and committing a high number of turnovers; the defense, a specialty of Brown's, was also vulnerable. In addition to Nash's and Howard's ailments, Bryant had been playing with an injured foot and was unable to practice. The Lakers, however, had an urgency to win and were not compelled to wait given their aging stars, Howard's pending free agency the coming summer, and owner Jerry Buss' deteriorating health. Brown's dismissal after five games was the third-fastest coaching change in NBA history.

=== D'Antoni takes over ===
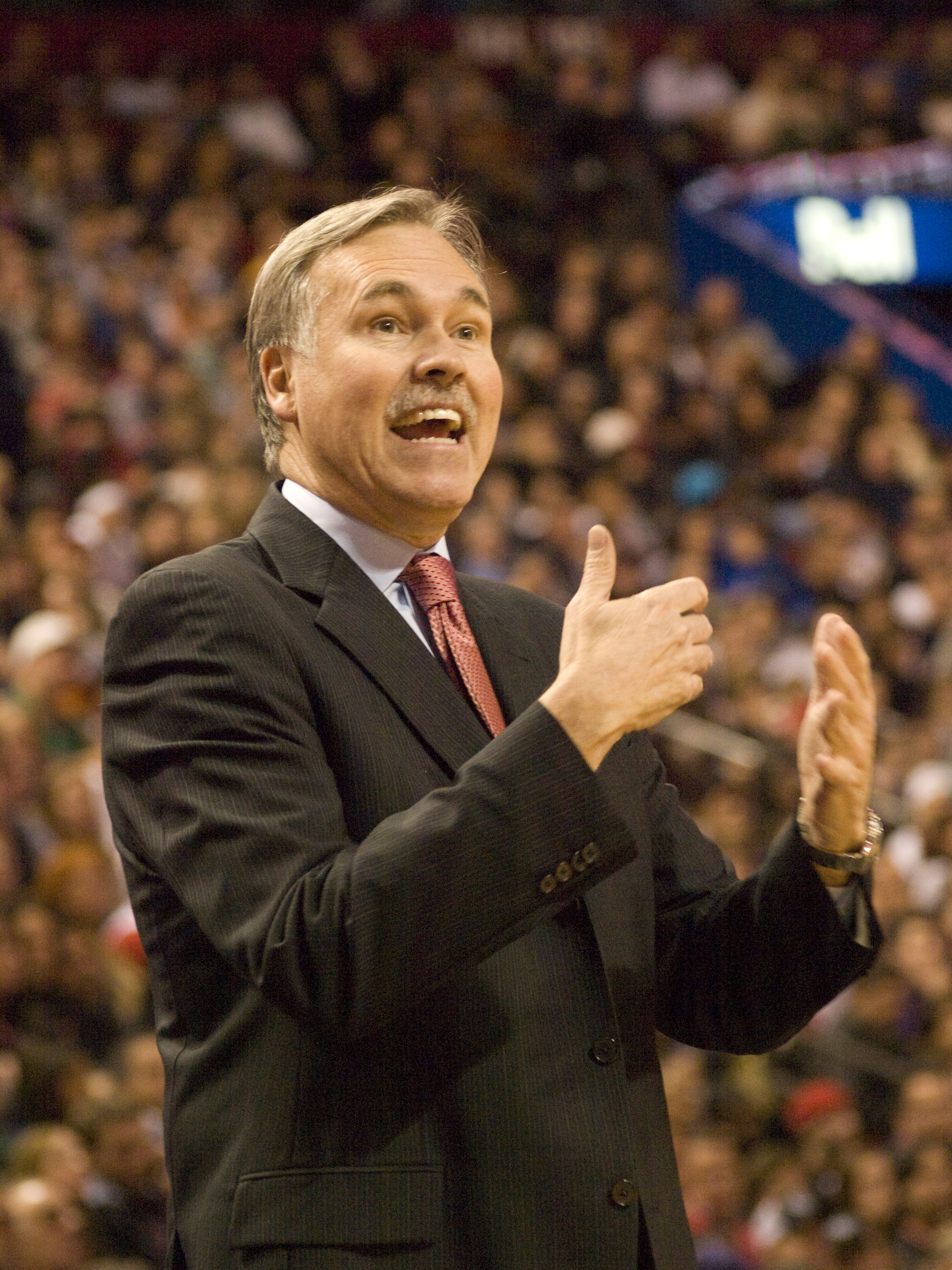
Mike D'Antoni was hired as new Lakers coach.

In the media, former Lakers coach Phil Jackson became the leading candidate to replace Brown. In the meantime, assistant coach Bernie Bickerstaff was the interim head coach. He won the first two games he coached, while the crowd at Staples Center chanted "We Want Phil" during the games. The Lakers talked with Jackson first, but he requested two days to consider the opening. He believed the Lakers would wait for his response, but the Lakers thought it was understood they would continue their search. The next day, the team talked with Mike D'Antoni and signed him to a multi-year contract in a unanimous decision by the front office. They felt that D'Antoni's fast-paced style of play made him a "great fit" for the team, more suitable than Jackson's structured triangle offense. Buss' preference had always been for the Lakers to have a wide-open offense. D'Antoni was reunited with Nash, who was a league MVP twice in four seasons under D'Antoni while with the Phoenix Suns. Bryant was also familiar with D'Antoni; Bryant as a child knew him when D'Antoni was a star in Italy and Bryant's father was also playing there. Bryant grew close with D'Antoni during their time with the United States national team.

D'Antoni's coaching debut with the Lakers was delayed as he recovered from knee replacement surgery. He had surgery weeks before on October 31, as he originally expected that he was taking a year off from coaching and would have months to recover. Bickerstaff continued to be the Lakers' interim coach; he finished with a 4–1 record, winning his last two as D'Antoni started leading team practices. Older brother Dan D'Antoni was named a new assistant coach and also assisted. In his first press conference, D'Antoni predicted that the Lakers, then 3–5 and ranked 20th in scoring with 96.5 points per game, should instead be scoring "110–115 points a game". He wanted to revive Showtime. He reiterated general manager Mitch Kupchak's belief that the Lakers were built to win an NBA championship that season. D'Antoni was glad to be back with Nash, noting his unsuccessful stint with the New York Knicks without him. On November 20, he coached his first game—nine days after he was hired—in a 95–90 win against the Brooklyn Nets. The Lakers matched their worst start on the road (0–4) since the 1995–96 season, but snapped the streak with a 115–89 win over the Dallas Mavericks; it was also their first 100-point effort in the first four games under D'Antoni.

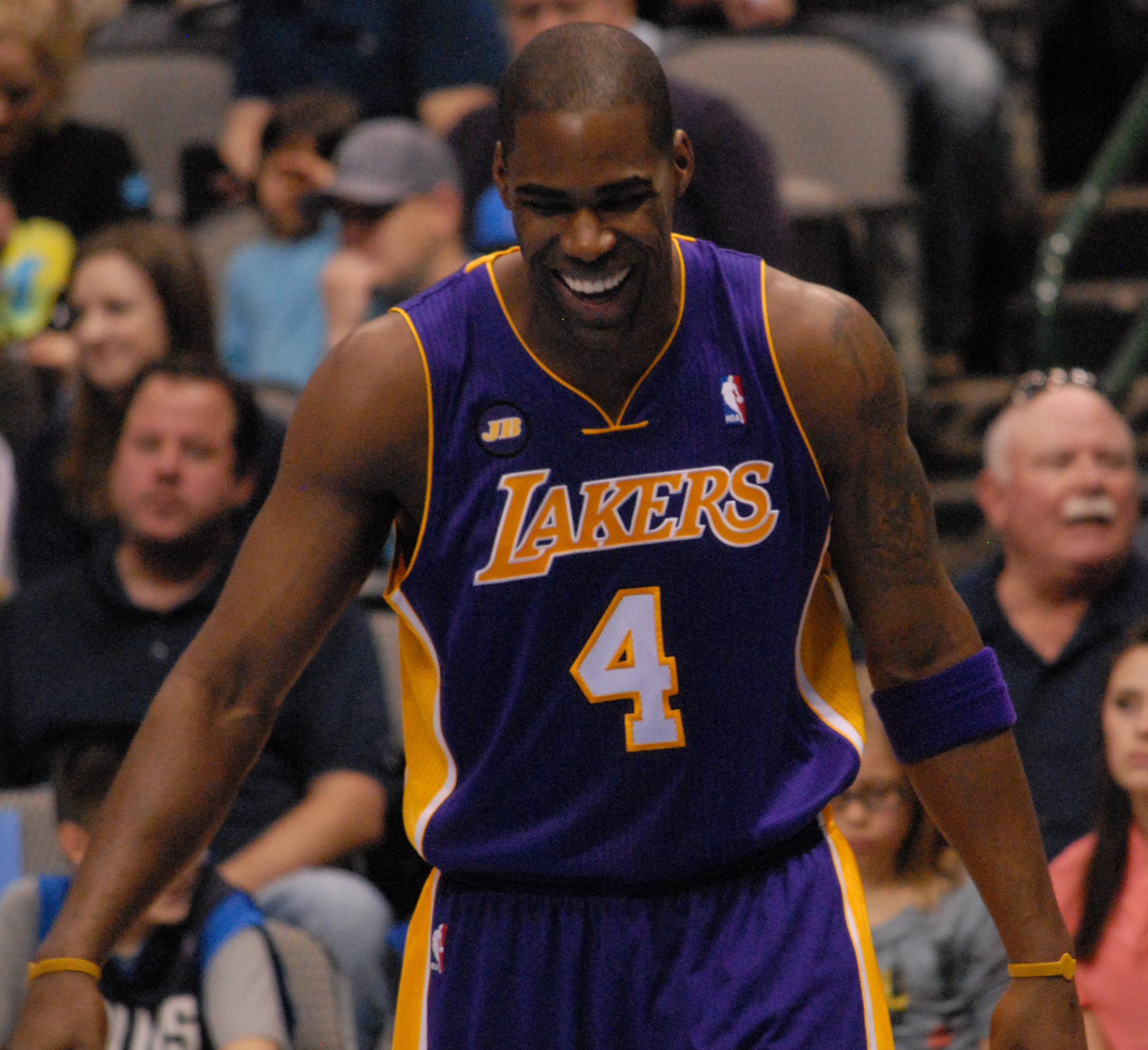
Antawn Jamison became the first Laker since 1998 to score 30 points in a game off the bench.

With Nash still out, D'Antoni started 2–3 as a Laker, a minimal improvement over Brown's 1–4 start. The team had been struggling to get the big men Gasol and Howard involved in the new offense. Bryant was also adjusting, running more screen-rolls and fewer post ups than at any time in his career. Additionally, backup point guard Steve Blake had been out since an abdominal injury on November 11, and he would not return until late January. On November 30, the Lakers made 17 three-point field goals—tying a team record for a regulation game—in a 122–103 win over the Denver Nuggets. Free agent acquisition Antawn Jamison scored 33 points, the first time a Laker had scored 30 points as a reserve since Shaquille O'Neal in 1998. Jamison also made five three-pointers, while Jodie Meeks scored 21 on a career-high seven three-pointers. Howard even added the second three-pointer of his career in addition to his 28 points and 20 rebounds. They lost 113–103 to the Orlando Magic the following home game in Howard's first matchup against his former team. He had 21 points and 15 rebounds, but he was intentionally fouled and shot only 9–for-21 on his free throws.

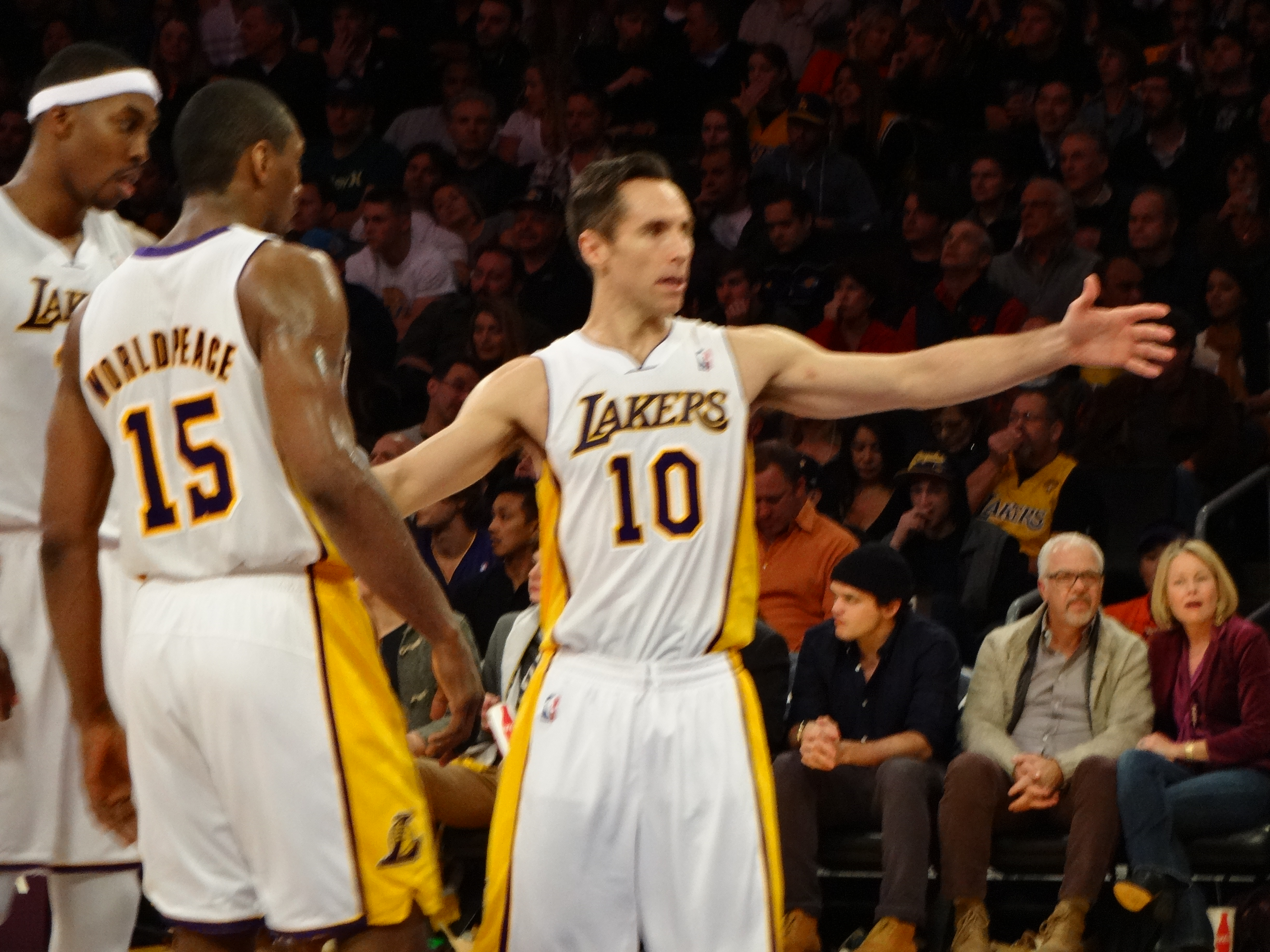
Steve Nash returned in late December after missing 24 games with a fractured left leg.

After being bothered by tendinitis in both knees since training camp, Gasol missed the next game. He was struggling after seven games under D'Antoni, averaging 10.1 points and 8.0 rebounds while shooting 38.8 percent, and he was benched in the fourth quarter in multiple games. The Lakers lost 116–107 to the Knicks in D'Antoni's first game back to New York since he left the previous season. The Lakers allowed another big quarter as they trailed 41–27 in the first quarter. Bryant scored 31, but Los Angeles fell to 1–11 when he scored 30+ points, 1–5 without Gasol, and 4–9 overall under D'Antoni. Gasol returned after an eight-game absence, contributing 10 points, nine rebounds and five assists in a 101–100 win over the lowly Charlotte Bobcats. The Lakers overcame an 18-point deficit for their third win in a row, only the second time in the season the streak had been achieved. Nash started against the Golden State Warriors after missing 24 games, and he had 12 points and nine assists in a 118–115 overtime road victory. The team was 12–12 during his absence, and won three of their first four games after his return.

=== Early 2013 struggles ===
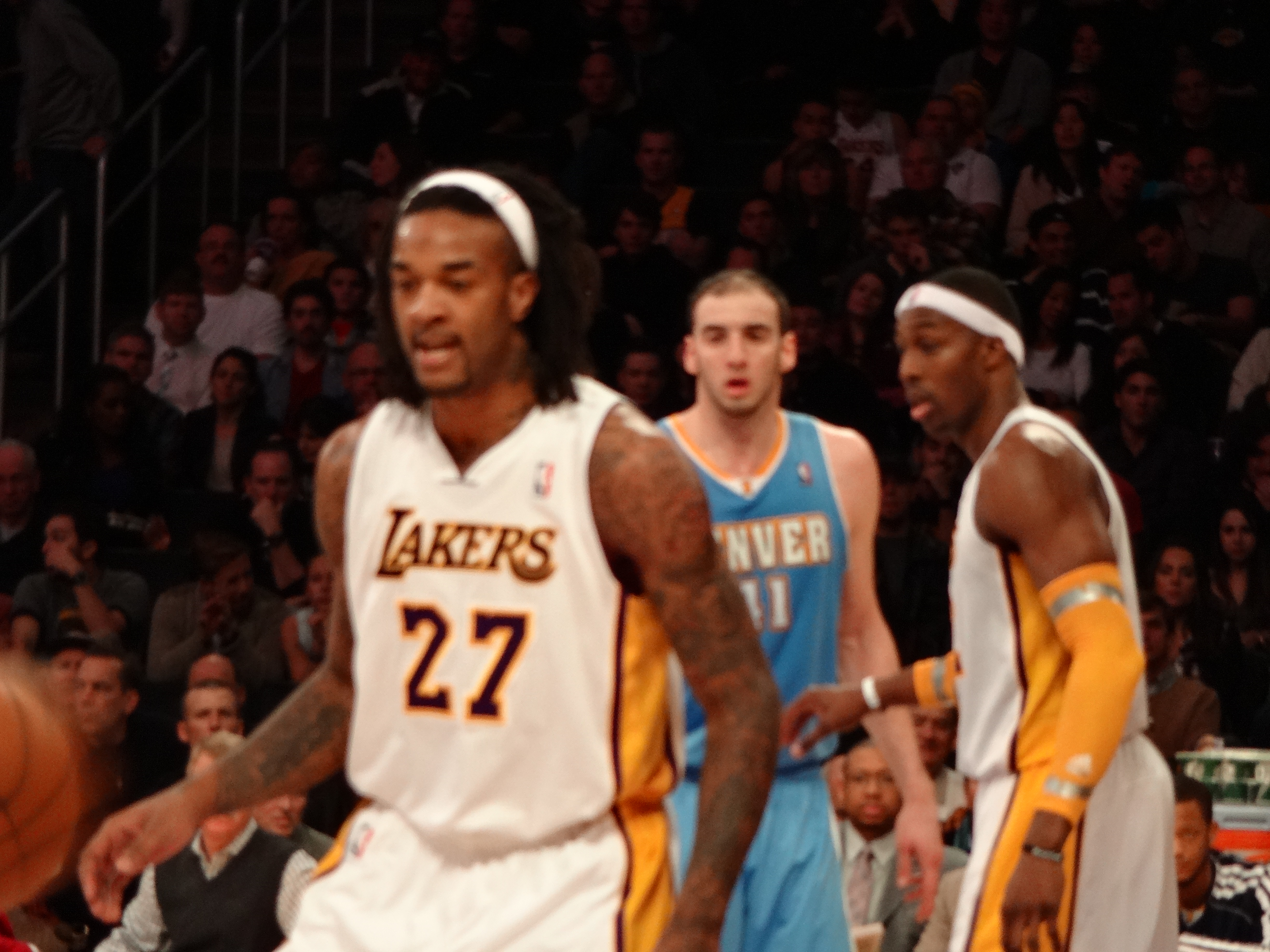
Jordan Hill (No. 27) was out for the season after a hip injury in January.

The Lakers lost on New Year's Day, and their 15–16 record matched their worst start after 31 games since the 2002–03 season. According to Bryant, the team lacked energy "because we're old as ..." Prior to their second meeting with their crosstown rivals on January 4, the Clippers were 25–8 and fighting for the best record in the league, while the Lakers were nine games behind the Clippers and looking to secure a playoff spot in the Western Conference. For only the fourth time in their prior 127 meetings since they moved to Los Angeles, the Clippers had a better record than the Lakers entering their matchup when both teams had played 30 or more games. Bryant called the Clippers "top contenders" for a championship before the Lakers lost again to the Clippers. Kupchak told Lakers season-ticket holders the team needed Gasol to be more involved, and the Lakers needed to play better defense. He did not believe that the team, whose roster's average age was 28.5, was too old to win a championship. The Lakers followed with a home loss to Denver, when Lakers fans revived the "We Want Phil" chants from two months earlier. It was their fourth loss in five games, dropping them to 15–18 and 11th place in the West, three games behind the Portland Trail Blazers for the eighth and final playoff spot. Nash estimated the Lakers would need a minimum of 45 wins to qualify for the playoffs, which would require the team go 30–19 (.612) the following 49 games after playing .455 ball in their first 33 games. After the Denver game, Howard had his right shoulder heavily wrapped in ice. He had played through an injury suffered the previous game against the Clippers, and had tied a career high with 26 rebounds against Denver. Gasol suffered a concussion in the game after receiving a blow to the face from Denver's JaVale McGee in the fourth quarter, and back-up big man Jordan Hill also injured his right hip in the game. Howard and Gasol were declared out indefinitely. Hill, who had brought hustle that was lacking in the team, required surgery that was expected to keep him out until summer.

The team had divergent viewpoints on how they would improve. Howard thought that team chemistry needed to improve. Bryant believed it was okay if the locker room was chippy. D'Antoni said that chemistry-building was overrated if the team played with maximum effort. In response to a New York Daily News report that Howard had to be restrained from going after him, Bryant posted a photo on Twitter of Howard and him jokingly squaring off as D'Antoni looks on with a shocked expression. On January 8, 2013, Nash became the fifth player in NBA history to reach 10,000 career assists; however, Los Angeles lost the game 125–112 to the Houston Rockets for their fourth consecutive loss, tying their longest streak of the season. Due to the Lakers' injuries, rookie center Robert Sacre also made his first career start against the Rockets, finishing with 10 points, four blocked shots and three rebounds; Their losing streak grew after losses to the San Antonio Spurs and Oklahoma City Thunder, dropping the Lakers to 15–21 for their worst start since the 1993–94 season. World Peace also suffered a right leg injury against the Thunder that would hamper him for two months.

Compared to the 2011–12 team that finished 41–25, the Lakers offense had improved in points per 100 possessions (108.3 vs. 106.0), but their defense underperformed. The team was lacking continuity with the projected starting lineup at the beginning of the season having played just 117 minutes together, primarily due to injuries. Howard returned the following game as the Lakers won their first game of 2013, stopping their losing streak at six with a 113–93 win over the lowly Cleveland Cavaliers (9–30). In a move to improve the team's defense, D'Antoni began having Bryant guard the opponent's best perimeter player; Bryant was the primary defender on the Cavaliers' Kyrie Irving, who was held to 15 points. Bryant acknowledged he was a more focused defender when he had a challenging defensive assignment as opposed to when he played off the ball against weaker players. His defense disrupted opponents and freed Nash from unfavorable matchups. In addition to his leg injury, World Peace also suffered an injury to his right arm that made it difficult to bend. Things got so bad, D'Antoni moved him off the perimeter on defense and had him guard power forwards instead.

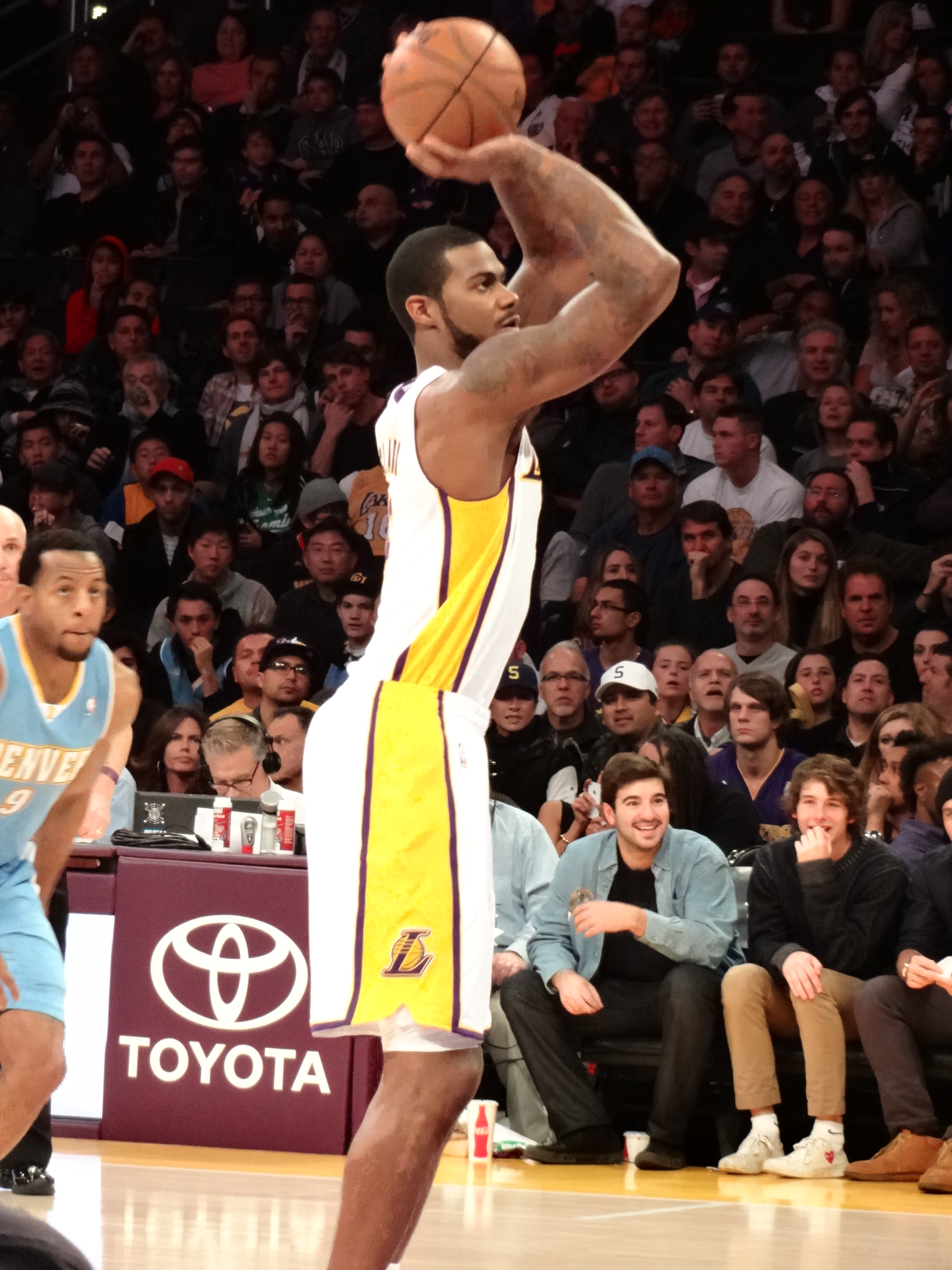
Earl Clark was added to the starting lineup for his quickness.

Gasol returned after missing five games, coming off the bench in his first game back before returning to the starting lineup. After a 95–83 road loss to the Chicago Bulls, the Lakers ninth loss in 11 games for an overall 5–14 road record, Los Angeles fell to 12th place in the West with a 17–24 record at the midpoint of the season. Calling it a permanent move, D'Antoni had benched Gasol in the game and started Earl Clark to form the faster and smaller lineup that the coach preferred. The team was already ranked No. 2 in pace. Under D'Antoni, the Lakers dropped to 12-19 while scoring an average of 103.3 points a game but surrendering 103.4. Offensively, they reached the 110-point threshold just eight times in the 31 games, going 5–3. However, D'Antoni stressed that the team's focus needed to be on its defense, not offense.

=== Another new offense ===
The Lakers struggled to run D'Antoni's fast-paced offense. Howard's back surgery was still affecting his conditioning, and he struggled with Nash to run the pick and roll, a play that D'Antoni expected would be a staple for the team. The team also lacked the shooters and speed that the offense required. Before playing the Memphis Grizzlies, the Lakers held a team meeting to clear the air; the Los Angeles Times reported that "guys went at each other a little bit." The players told D'Antoni that they needed to slow down the pace. The coach likened the Lakers to an All-Star team in which "everybody gets the ball and goes one on one and then they play no defense." He added that they "haven't learned that there's a pecking order" where stars need to know their roles. Howard, who was averaging 17.1 points, 12.3 rebounds and 2.5 blocks, said he needed to "bring it" and dominate in more ways than just scoring. Many times Howard had been upset that he was not getting the ball enough, and he felt that Bryant was shooting too much. Howard predicted the next game would be "the start of a new season"; D'Antoni had made a similar declaration a week earlier, when they won two games before losing three in a row.

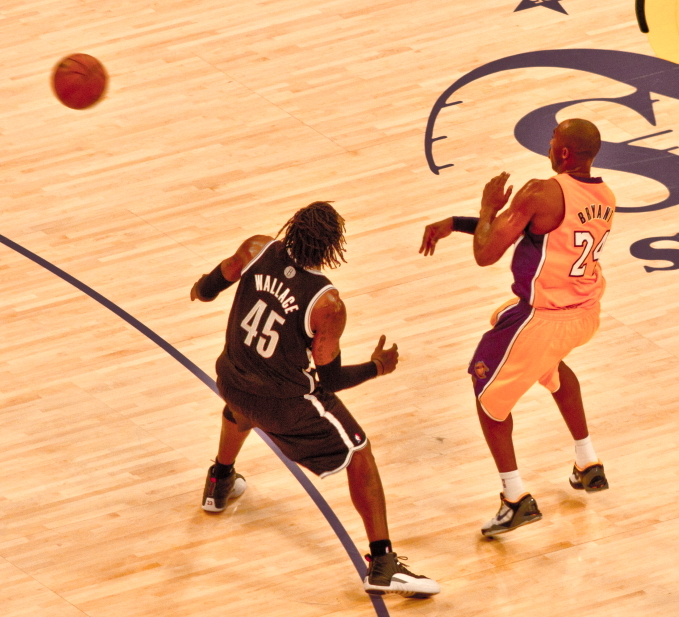
New Lakers offense made Kobe Bryant more of a facilitator.

In their first game of the second half, the Lakers lost 106–93 to Memphis. Los Angeles was four games behind eighth-place Portland, but only three games ahead of last-place Phoenix and New Orleans. Only five Western teams had ever made the playoffs after a start of 17–25 or worse, the last being Denver in 2004–05 when they went 32–8 to finish 49–33. Their defensive rating, points per 100 possessions, was ranked only 20th in the league. The Lakers won their next three home games after they dropped D'Antoni's offense and played without any system. "We play basketball. The system is move the ball, play hard defense, space the floor and who's open shoots. It's not a difficult thing", said D'Antoni. The coach moved Nash off the ball and made him more of a spot-up shooter, while Bryant became the primary facilitator on offense. The defense was also more energized. Bryant had at least 10 assists in all three wins with a three-game total of 39 assists, the most in his career. He missed a triple-double in each game with nine rebounds twice and eight in the other. Prior to the role change, Bryant had been leading the league in scoring though much of the first 42 games. Howard and Bryant credited the meeting in Memphis with bringing the team together.

The Lakers, who were 5–15 on the road, went on an important seven-game, 12-day road trip. They lost the first game of the trip to the Suns on January 30 after blowing 13-point lead in the fourth quarter. Los Angeles finished January winless in seven games on the road, the first time in franchise history they finished a calendar month 0–7 or worse. Howard left the Phoenix game early after re-aggravating his shoulder. Playing without Howard, Gasol returned to the starting lineup and the Lakers won the next two games, their first road wins in 2013 despite blowing double-digit leads in the four games since Phoenix. On February 5, they won 92–83 at Brooklyn—their sixth win in seven games and third straight without Howard—but lost Gasol for an estimated six-to-eight weeks after he tore the plantar fascia of his right foot towards the end of the game. Bryant urged Howard to return and play through the pain, saying that the center "worries too much" and was tentative to return because he "doesn't want to let anyone down". Howard mentioned that Bryant and Shaquille O'Neal needed three years to win a title together, but Bryant replied, "We don't have three years. We've got this year." Howard responded that Bryant was "not a doctor, I'm not a doctor. That's his opinion."

Howard returned the next game after missing three games, but the Lakers lost 116–95 to the Boston Celtics. They finished their road trip 4–3 after a loss to the defending NBA champion Miami Heat. The Lakers were tied at the half and trailed the Heat by only five entering the final period, but committed eight turnovers in the final 10 minutes. In their next game at home, Bryant had eight turnovers and scored only four points—his lowest since a two-point game in his second season 1998—but had nine assists in a win over a weak Phoenix team. In their last game before the All-Star break, they were outscored by the Clippers 15–0 to start the game and lost 125–101, clinching the season series for the Clippers for the first time in 20 years since 1992–93. The Lakers entered the break 25–29 after winning 8 of their last 12 games. They were represented at the All-Star Game by Bryant and Howard, who were both starters.

=== Jerry Buss' death and Post All-Star success ===
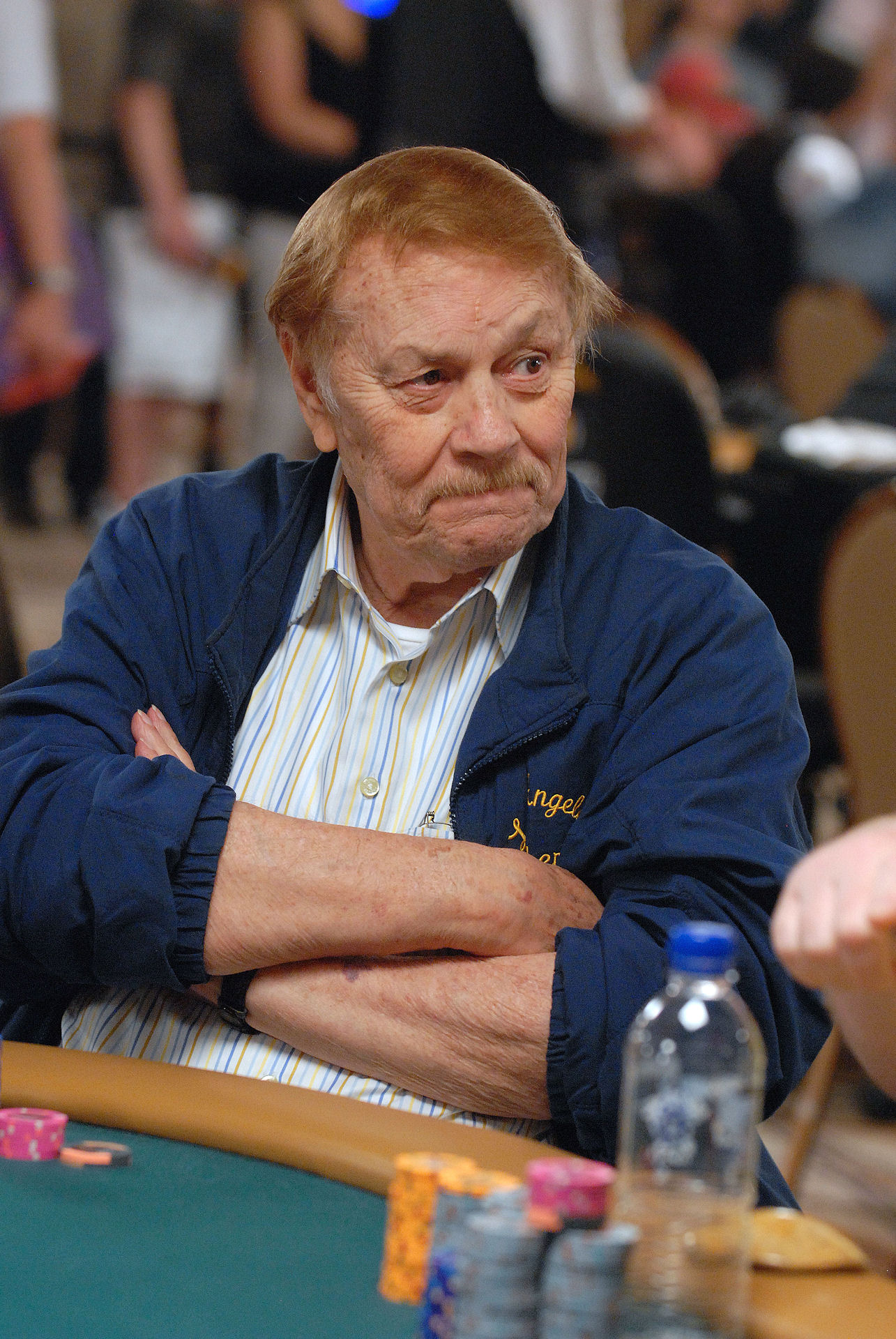
Owner Jerry Buss died over the All-Star break.

During the break, Howard committed to having a better second half. An avid candy lover, Howard adopted a healthier diet to get into better shape to anchor the Lakers' defense and run D'Antoni's preferred pick and rolls. On February 18, the day after the All-Star game, Buss died after being hospitalized for 18 months with cancer. In honor of their owner, the team wore commemorative patches with the initials "JB" on their jerseys for the remainder of the season. The Lakers entered their post-All-Star schedule with a 25–29 (.463) record, 3 1/2 games behind eighth-place Houston. D'Antoni predicted that Lakers needed at least 45 wins to qualify for the playoffs, requiring them to finish 20–8 (.714). Of the Lakers remaining 28 games, half were against teams with winning records compared to only 44% for the Rockets. In the three previous full NBA seasons, the final playoff seed in the West averaged 48 wins.

The Lakers were 3–0 in their first week back, including a win over the rival Celtics. Bryant was named the Western Conference player of the week after averaging 31.3 points, 7.7 rebounds and 6.0 assists. He scored 38 points while shooting at least 60% in consecutive games, the first time in his career; he also became the oldest player to accomplish the feat. Bryant said he was "in attack mode since the [All-Star] break", but was reacting to the defense to determine if he should score or be a playmaker. Howard was looking fresher since the break, yet still said he was "not even close" to physically being where he wanted to be. D'Antoni attributed his conditioning to his difficulty with running the pick and roll. On February 25, the Lakers lost 119–108 at Denver, failing to reach .500 for the first time since New Year's Day. Last in the NBA in points allowed off fast breaks, they were outscored by the Nuggets 33–3 on fast breaks. The Lakers' three-point shooting and turnovers contributed to their season's fast break woes. Their mediocre three-point shooting resulted in an increase in long rebounds, and they were among the worst in the league in turnovers and last in points allowed per game off turnovers. The Lakers were 9–4 in February, ending the month with a 29–30 record after entering it 20–26. Bryant was named Western Conference player of the month after averaging 23.9 points with 6.6 assists and 6.7 rebounds a game.

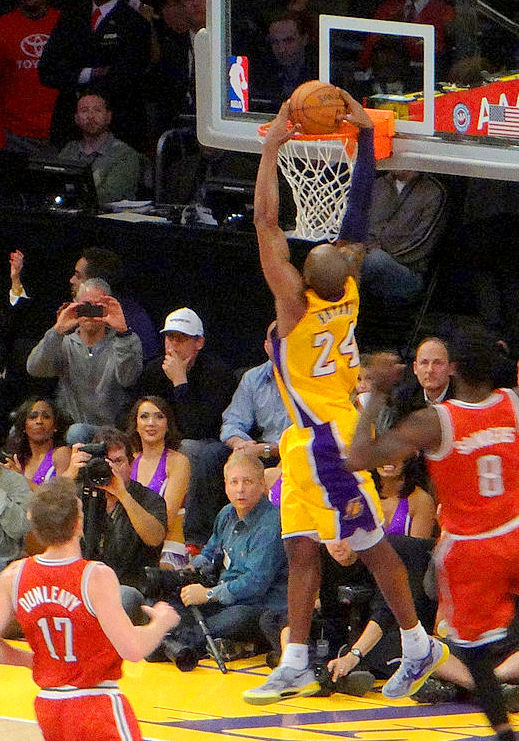
Bryant won Western Conference Player of the Week honors after the Lakers climbed to eighth place.

On March 3, the Lakers won 99–98 against a quality opponent in the Atlanta Hawks, and they reached .500 for the first time since December 28. They blew a 16-point lead in the second half, but Bryant scored the Lakers' final six points, including the game-winner with nine seconds left in the game. There were four lead changes in the final minute. The Lakers improved to 13–5, the fourth best record in the NBA, since their team meeting in Memphis. They also gained 1 1/2 games on the final playoff seed during that span. However, they dropped below .500 again after a 122–105 loss at Oklahoma City. The Lakers fell to 10–20 on the road and 2–13 against the top five teams in the Western Conference. They won their next two games with 25- and 15-point comebacks over New Orleans and Toronto, respectively. Bryant scored at least 40 points and had at least 10 assists in both games, becoming the first Laker to accomplish the feat since Jerry West in 1970. On March 10, Los Angeles beat Chicago 90–81 and moved 1/2 game ahead of the Utah Jazz for the final playoff spot in the West. It was the first time they owned sole possession of a top-8 spot since December 1, and the first time they were two games above .500 all season. After the 3–0 week in which he averaged 33 points, 8.8 assists and 5.8 rebounds, Bryant was again named Western Conference Player of the Week. The Lakers were 8–2 since the All-Star break, and Howard had 10 straight games with 12 or more rebounds while averaging 15.5 points, 14.8 rebounds, and 2.6 blocks. In Howard's first return to Orlando on March 12, he scored a season-high 39 points and had 16 rebounds in a 106–97 Lakers win. It was only the second time Los Angeles had won four straight all season. Booed throughout the game, Howard made 25-of-39 free throws, setting Lakers records for free throws made and attempted while tying his NBA record for attempts. (Note: The previous Lakers records were held by Bryant, who made 23 twice—most recently in 2006 against New York—while Shaquille O'Neal attempted 31 in 1999 against Chicago.) He made 16-of-20 free throws when he was fouled intentionally by the Magic.

=== More injuries ===
The Lakers lost their next game at Atlanta, 96–92, as Bryant severely sprained his left ankle. He was declared out indefinitely after landing on the Hawks' Dahntay Jones' foot. Bryant suggested that Jones intentionally put his foot under him, which Jones denied. Bryant said it was his worst sprain since he landed on Jalen Rose's foot in Game 2 of the 2000 NBA Finals, which Rose later admitted was on purpose. The Lakers failed for the 13th time to win both games played on back-to-back nights, and they fell to 12–21 on the road and 2–16 against teams above .500. Bryant gutted out 12 minutes of play in the next game against the Indiana Pacers, which the Lakers won 99–93; Bryant was scoreless for only the 15th time in his 17-year NBA career. However, he sat out the next two games due to his ankle sprain. The Lakers went 1–1, failing to win back-to-back games again after losing the second night at Phoenix. The Suns were tied with New Orleans for the West's worst record, but the Lakers scored a season low in the 99–76 loss.

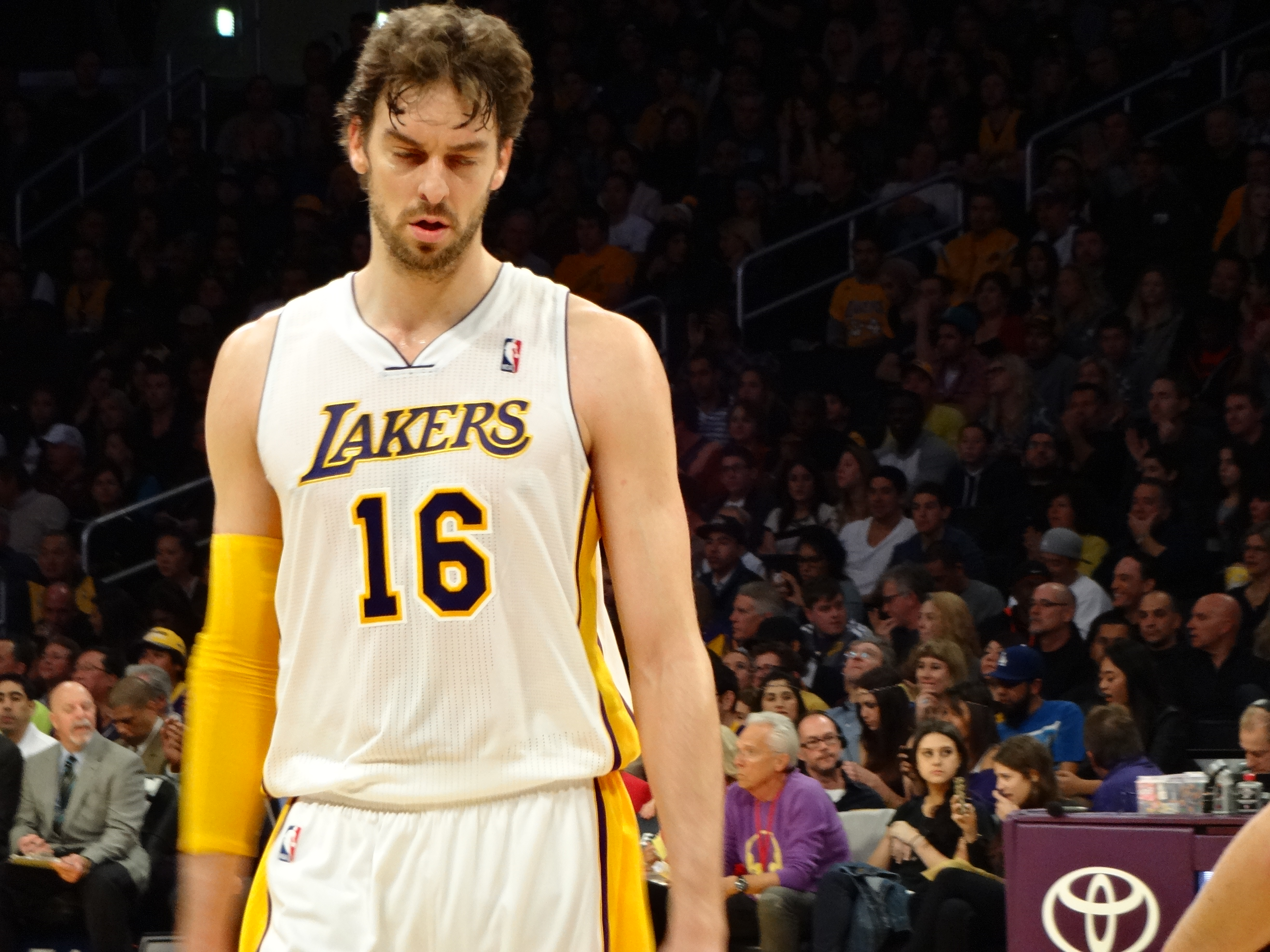
Pau Gasol replaced Clark as a starter in March.

Bryant returned against the Washington Wizards along with Gasol, who played for the first time in over six weeks, but the Lakers lost 103–100 at home after leading by 18. On March 25, the Lakers lost to the Warriors, virtually eliminating any chance of the Lakers advancing to the 6th or 7th playoffs seeds past Golden State or Houston, which seemed feasible weeks earlier. The Lakers also lost World Peace in the game after he tore the lateral meniscus in his left knee. He underwent surgery that was originally estimated to sideline him for six weeks. The Lakers' three-game losing streak was partially attributed to D'Antoni reintegrating Gasol into the starting lineup over Clark, making the team taller but slower. After winning the next game against Minnesota, the Lakers failed to win on consecutive nights for the 15th time, losing 113–103 to the Milwaukee Bucks. Nash sat out the end of the game due to hip and hamstring issues. Bothered by a bone spur in his left foot, Bryant also left the game. The Lakers fell behind Utah in the standings. Both Bryant and Nash played in the next game, a 103–98 win over the Sacramento Kings, but Nash left the game after less than two minutes with a strained hamstring.

Nash remained out, but the Lakers won their next two games to pull ahead of Utah by a half game. Bryant had a triple-double with 23 points, 11 rebounds and 11 assists against Dallas, followed by 24 points and nine assists in a win over Memphis. Playing most of the game at the elbow on offense, Gasol added 19 points, nine rebounds, and three assists. "We're using him the right way", Bryant said. On April 7, the Lakers lost 109–95 to the Clippers, who clinched their first Pacific Division title in franchise history. The Lakers had won 23 of the previous 42 division titles. The loss also completed a season sweep by the Clippers, 4–0. The franchise had not swept the Lakers since 1974–75, when they were the Buffalo Braves. The defeat coupled with a Jazz win dropped the Lakers (40–37) a half game behind Utah (41–37), who would win in the event of a tie after winning the season series 2–1. The Jazz would finish ahead of the Lakers if they won the remaining four games on their schedule.

=== Fight for playoffs ===
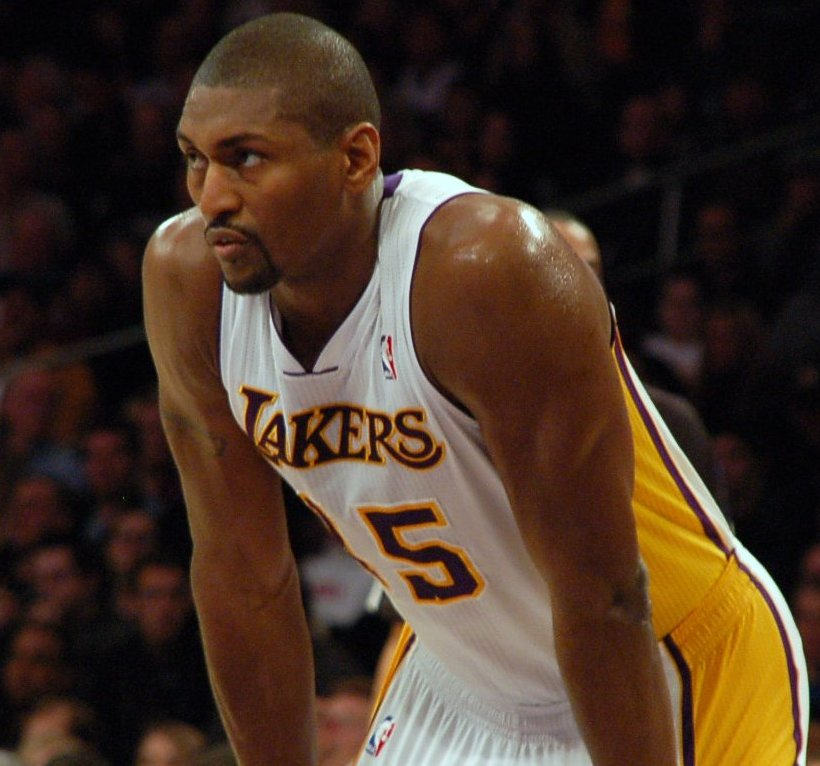
Metta World Peace returned 12 days after surgery after initial estimates of six weeks.

On April 9, Utah lost to Oklahoma City, while Los Angeles defeated New Orleans 104–96 to regain a half-game lead for eighth place. Bryant scored 23 of his 30 points in the fourth quarter, and Gasol had 22 points, 11 rebounds, four assists and three blocks. World Peace played 15 minutes in the game, returning 12 days after his surgery though initial estimates were six weeks. In his absence, D'Antoni was using a reduced seven-man rotation with Bryant playing close to all 48 minutes each game. The next night, the Lakers played in Portland, where they had lost 12 of their previous 14, and 17 of 21 since 2002. Portland appeared vulnerable without three starters and starting four rookies, but they led 95–90 in the fourth quarter. The Lakers came back to win, 113–106, as Bryant scored 47 points while playing all 48 minutes. It was the Lakers' first sweep in back-to-back games after 16 attempts during the season. Gasol also had 23 points, seven rebounds and nine assists, while Howard contributed 20 points and 10 rebounds. Bryant, Gasol, and Howard combined for 90 points, their highest of the season. The Lakers moved a full game ahead of the Jazz with three games remaining, all at home, against playoff-bound Golden State, San Antonio and Houston.

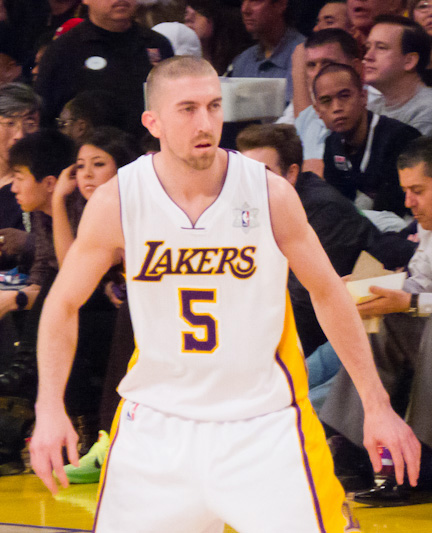
Steve Blake averaged 23.5 points in final two games without Bryant.

On April 12, the Lakers beat the Warriors 118–116, but Bryant left with a torn Achilles tendon that ended his season and was expected to sideline him for six to nine months. Bryant had injured both of his knees after collisions with the Warriors' Festus Ezeli in the third quarter, but he played every minute before leaving with 3:06 left in the game. He finished with 34 points, and Gasol had 26 points, 11 rebounds and 10 assists for his sixth career triple-double. Howard had 28 points, making 14 of 22 free throws. Bryant's injury came while he was playing seven consecutive quarters and at least 40 minutes for seven consecutive games. He was averaging his most minutes (38.6) in six years, and only Portland rookie Damian Lillard was averaging more minutes. Kupchak had spoken to Bryant about his extensive playing time 10 days earlier, but Bryant insisted the minutes needed to continue given the Lakers' playoff push. Frustrated by his injury, Bryant expressed a range of emotions while ranting on Facebook in the middle of the night.

In their first game without Bryant, the Lakers won 91–88 against the Spurs. Howard had 26 points and 17 rebounds and Blake added 23 points. The Lakers went 4–0 that week, and Bryant won Player of the Week honors for the third time despite missing the San Antonio game. He led the league in scoring that week (37.0), ranked second in the Western Conference in steals (2.67 per game), and averaged 6.3 rebounds and 5.0 assists. On the last day of the season, the Lakers still risked missing the playoffs, but they qualified after a loss by the Jazz. The Lakers then defeated the Rockets 99–95 in overtime, and moved past them into the seventh seed in the West. Gasol had another triple double with 17 points, 20 rebounds, and 11 assists. Blake added 24 points, while Howard had 16 points and 18 rebounds. Nash missed his eighth straight game.

D'Antoni was named Western Conference Coach of the Month after the Lakers went 7–1 in April. They finished the season 28–12 after dropping to 17–25 in January the day of their team meeting in Memphis. Their defense also improved to 13th during that span, finishing the season 18th at 103.6 points per 100 possessions. The Lakers expected starting five of Bryant, Nash, Howard, Gasol and World Peace started together just seven times all season and without registering a win. "The Lakers didn't help things by making the coaching change and putting (D'Antoni) in that situation, which he was glad to take. But I think it was a little bit tougher than he thought it would be", Kupchak said.

=== First-round playoff exit ===
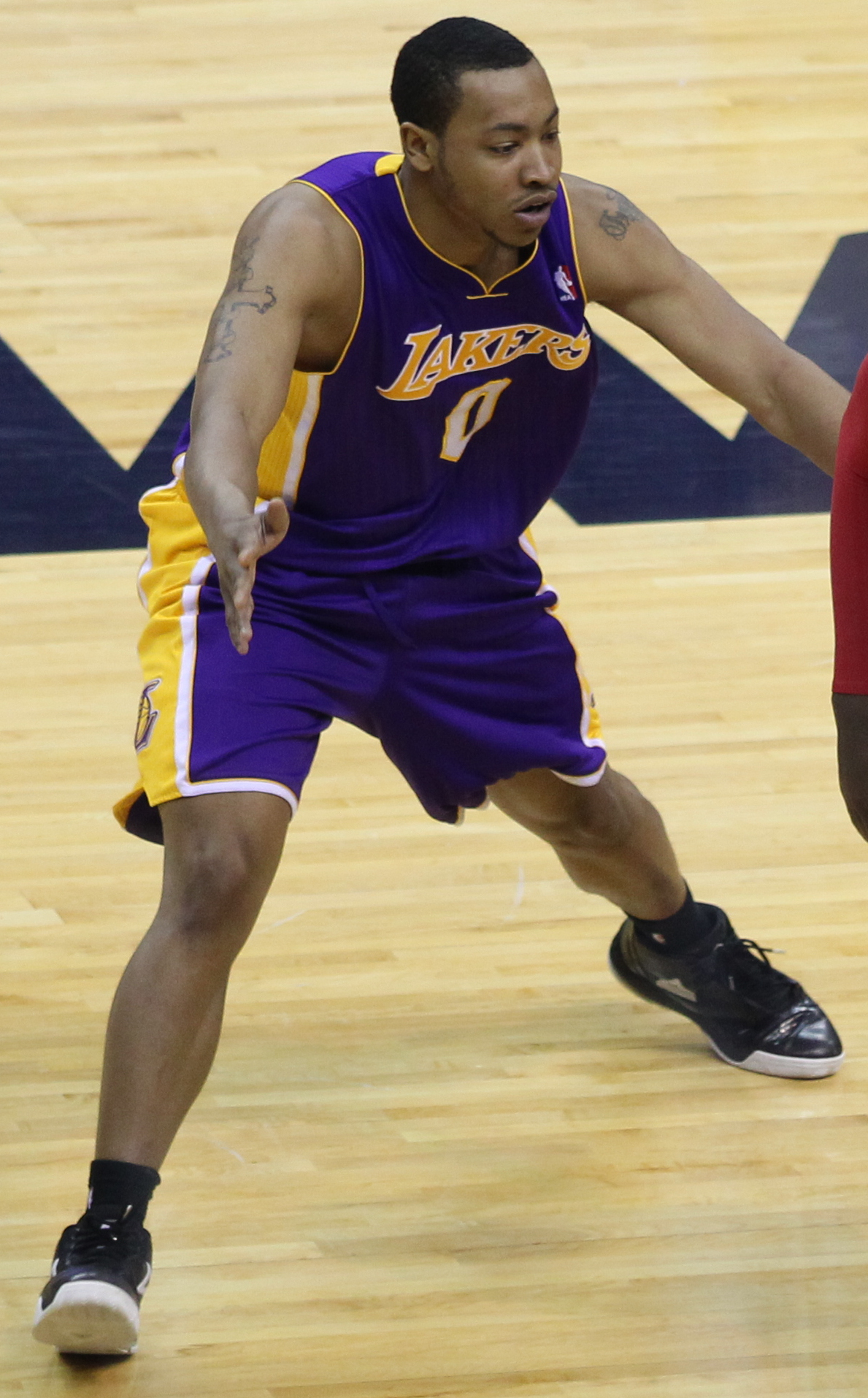
Andrew Goudelock scored a career-high 20 points in his first playoff start.

The Lakers faced San Antonio in the first round of the playoffs. In Game 1, Howard had 20 points and 15 rebounds, and Gasol added 16 points and 16 rebounds, but the Lakers did not take full advantage of their inside game and lost 91–79. Nash returned after missing nine games and scored 16 points. Meeks sprained his ankle in the game and missed Game 2. The Lakers shot better, but so did the Spurs as Los Angeles lost 102–91. Jordan Hill returned and played for the first time since his injury in January. However, Blake left the game after injuring his right hamstring and was declared out indefinitely. Nash also re-injured his hamstring but continued to play in the game;

With Nash and Blake out in Game 3, the Lakers instead started second-year guards Darius Morris and Andrew Goudelock. In his first playoff start, Goudelock scored a career-high 20 points, but the Lakers lost 120–89 at Staples for their worst home playoff loss in franchise history. (Note: Previous mark was a 29-point home loss to Portland on May 22 in the 2000 playoffs.) Gasol added his third triple-double in six games. Due to the Lakers' other injuries, World Peace played in spite of running with discomfort after having fluid drained from a cyst behind his surgically repaired left knee. He was ruled out of Game 4 along with Nash, Blake, and Meeks. They were swept by the Spurs after losing Game 4, 103–82. Howard was ejected from the game with over nine minutes left in the third quarter after receiving his second technical foul. Shortly after, the quiet home crowd roared as Bryant hobbled to the bench, making his first appearance on the court since tearing his Achilles. Gasol received a standing ovation when he left the game with 3:08 remaining. The Lakers exited in the opening round of the playoffs for the first time since 2007, and suffered their first opening-round sweep since 1967.

== Standings ==
Pacific Division	W	L	PCT	GB	Home	Road	Div	GP
y-Los Angeles Clippers	56	26	.683	–	32–9	24–17	11–5	82
x-Golden State Warriors	47	35	.573	9	28–13	19–22	9–7	82
x-Los Angeles Lakers	45	37	.549	11	29–12	16–25	8–8	82
Sacramento Kings	28	54	.341	28	20–21	8–33	7–9	82
Phoenix Suns	25	57	.305	31	17–24	8–33	5–11	82

Western Conference
#	Team	W	L	PCT	GB	GP
1	c-Oklahoma City Thunder *	60	22	.732	–	82
2	y-San Antonio Spurs *	58	24	.707	2.0	82
3	x-Denver Nuggets *	57	25	.695	3.0	82
4	y-Los Angeles Clippers	56	26	.683	4.0	82
5	x-Memphis Grizzlies	56	26	.683	4.0	82
6	x-Golden State Warriors	47	35	.573	13.0	82
7	x-Los Angeles Lakers	45	37	.549	15.0	82
8	x-Houston Rockets	45	37	.549	15.0	82
9	Utah Jazz	43	39	.524	17.0	82
10	Dallas Mavericks	41	41	.500	19.0	82
11	Portland Trail Blazers	33	49	.402	27.0	82
12	Minnesota Timberwolves	31	51	.378	29.0	82
13	Sacramento Kings	28	54	.341	32.0	82
14	New Orleans Hornets	27	55	.329	33.0	82
15	Phoenix Suns	25	57	.305	35.0	82

Notes

- c – Clinched home court advantage for the conference playoffs
- y – Clinched division title
- x – Clinched playoff spot
- o – Eliminated from playoff contention

== Game log ==
=== Preseason ===
2012 preseason game log
Total: 0–8 (home: 0–7; road: 0–1)
Preseason: 0–8 (home: 0–7; road: 0–1)

Game	Date	Team	Score	High points	High rebounds	High assists	Location Attendance	Record
1	October 7	Golden State	L 83-110	3 players tied (10)	Clark & Gasol (7)	4 players tied (3)	Save Mart Arena (Fresno, CA); 12,015	0–1
2	October 10	Portland	L 75-93	Steve Nash (13)	Antawn Jamison (7)	Gasol & Nash (4)	Citizens Business Bank Arena (Ontario, CA); 10,500	0–2
3	October 13	Utah	L 86-99	Kobe Bryant (18)	Robert Sacre (10)	Bryant & Nash (5)	Staples Center; 18,372	0–3
4	October 16	Utah	L 80-114	Kobe Bryant (31)	Reeves Nelson (7)	Steve Blake (4)	Honda Center (Anaheim, CA); 13,896	0–4
5	October 19	Sacramento	L 98-103	Kobe Bryant (22)	Metta World Peace (8)	Steve Nash (6)	Thomas & Mack Center (Las Vegas, NV); 17,792	0–5
6	October 21	Sacramento	L 92-99	Kobe Bryant (21)	Dwight Howard (12)	Gasol & Nash (5)	Staples Center; 18,997	0–6
7	October 24	@ L. A. Clippers	L 91-97	Pau Gasol (17)	Gasol & Hill (8)	Steve Nash (7)	Staples Center; 19,060	0–7
8	October 25	Sacramento	L 82-94	Devin Ebanks (14)	Jordan Hill (9)	Jordan Hill (5)	Valley View Casino Center (San Diego, CA); 11,200	0–8

2012–13 season schedule

=== Regular season ===
2012–13 game log
Total: 45–37 (home: 29–12; road: 16–25)
October: 0–2 (home: 0–1; road: 0–1)

Game	Date	Team	Score	High points	High rebounds	High assists	Location Attendance	Record
1	October 30	Dallas	L 91-99	Pau Gasol (23)	Pau Gasol (13)	Blake & Gasol (6)	Staples Center; 18,997	0–1
2	October 31	@ Portland	L 106-116	Dwight Howard (33)	Dwight Howard (14)	Dwight Howard (5)	Rose Garden; 20,401	0–2

November: 8–6 (home: 7–3; road: 1–3)

Game	Date	Team	Score	High points	High rebounds	High assists	Location Attendance	Record
3	November 2	LA Clippers	L 95-105	Kobe Bryant (40)	Pau Gasol (14)	Gasol & World Peace (3)	Staples Center; 18,997	0–3
4	November 4	Detroit	W 108-79	Dwight Howard (28)	3 players tied (7)	Kobe Bryant (8)	Staples Center; 18,997	1–3
5	November 7	@ Utah	L 86-95	Kobe Bryant (29)	Jordan Hill (12)	Kobe Bryant (4)	EnergySolutions Arena; 19,911	1–4
6	November 9	Golden State	W 101-77	Kobe Bryant (27)	Pau Gasol (16)	Kobe Bryant (7)	Staples Center; 18,997	2–4
7	November 11	Sacramento	W 103-90	Dwight Howard (23)	Dwight Howard (18)	Kobe Bryant (6)	Staples Center; 18,997	3–4
8	November 13	San Antonio	L 82-84	Kobe Bryant (28)	Dwight Howard (15)	Kobe Bryant (8)	Staples Center; 18,997	3–5
9	November 16	Phoenix	W 114-102	Kobe Bryant (31)	Dwight Howard (12)	Bryant & Morris (6)	Staples Center; 18,997	4–5
10	November 18	Houston	W 119-108	Dwight Howard (28)	Dwight Howard (13)	Kobe Bryant (11)	Staples Center; 18,997	5–5
11	November 20	Brooklyn	W 95-90	Kobe Bryant (25)	Dwight Howard (15)	Pau Gasol (7)	Staples Center; 18,997	6–5
12	November 21	@ Sacramento	L 97-113	Kobe Bryant (38)	Gasol & Howard (9)	Pau Gasol (4)	Sleep Train Arena; 15,249	6–6
13	November 23	@ Memphis	L 98-106	Kobe Bryant (30)	Antawn Jamison (7)	Kobe Bryant (4)	FedEx Forum; 18,119	6–7
14	November 24	@ Dallas	W 115-89	3 players tied (19)	Antawn Jamison (15)	Kobe Bryant (5)	American Airlines Center; 20,423	7–7
15	November 27	Indiana	L 77-79	Kobe Bryant (40)	Metta World Peace (12)	Metta World Peace (4)	Staples Center; 18,997	7–8
16	November 30	Denver	W 122-103	Antawn Jamison (33)	Dwight Howard (20)	3 players tied (8)	Staples Center; 18,997	8–8

December : 7–7 (home: 3–2; road: 4–5)

Game	Date	Team	Score	High points	High rebounds	High assists	Location Attendance	Record
17	December 2	Orlando	L 103–113	Kobe Bryant (34)	Dwight Howard (15)	Bryant & World Peace (5)	Staples Center; 18,997	8–9
18	December 4	@ Houston	L 105–107	Kobe Bryant (39)	Dwight Howard (12)	Chris Duhon (7)	Toyota Center; 18,052	8–10
19	December 5	@ New Orleans	W 103–87	Kobe Bryant (29)	Metta World Peace (9)	Chris Duhon (10)	New Orleans Arena; 18,449	9–10
20	December 7	@ Oklahoma City	L 108–114	Kobe Bryant (35)	Dwight Howard (18)	Kobe Bryant (7)	Chesapeake Energy Arena; 18,203	9–11
21	December 9	Utah	L 110–117	Kobe Bryant (34)	Dwight Howard (16)	Chris Duhon (11)	Staples Center; 18,997	9–12
22	December 11	@ Cleveland	L 94–100	Kobe Bryant (42)	Dwight Howard (20)	Dwight Howard (3)	Quicken Loans Arena; 19,172	9–13
23	December 13	@ New York	L 107–116	Kobe Bryant (31)	Kobe Bryant (10)	Kobe Bryant (6)	Madison Square Garden; 19,033	9–14
24	December 14	@ Washington	W 102–96	Kobe Bryant (30)	Dwight Howard (14)	Kobe Bryant (7)	Verizon Center; 20,308	10–14
25	December 16	@ Philadelphia	W 111–98	Kobe Bryant (34)	Metta World Peace (16)	Kobe Bryant (6)	Wells Fargo Center; 20,338	11–14
26	December 18	Charlotte	W 101–100	Kobe Bryant (30)	Dwight Howard (18)	Kobe Bryant (7)	Staples Center; 18,997	12–14
27	December 22	@ Golden State	W 118–115 (OT)	Kobe Bryant (34)	Bryant & Gasol (10)	Steve Nash (9)	Oracle Arena; 19,596	13–14
28	December 25	New York	W 100–94	Kobe Bryant (34)	Dwight Howard (12)	Steve Nash (11)	Staples Center; 18,997	14–14
29	December 26	@ Denver	L 114–126	Kobe Bryant (40)	Jordan Hill (9)	Steve Nash (8)	Pepsi Center; 19,155	14–15
30	December 28	Portland	W 104–87	Kobe Bryant (27)	Dwight Howard (14)	Steve Nash (10)	Staples Center; 18,997	15–15

January : 5–11 (home: 5–4; road: 0–7)

Game	Date	Team	Score	High points	High rebounds	High assists	Location Attendance	Record
31	January 1	Philadelphia	L 99–103	Kobe Bryant (36)	Dwight Howard (14)	Steve Nash (10)	Staples Center; 18,997	15–16
32	January 4	@ LA Clippers	L 102–107	Kobe Bryant (38)	Dwight Howard (15)	Steve Nash (10)	Staples Center; 20,179	15–17
33	January 6	Denver	L 105–112	Kobe Bryant (29)	Dwight Howard (26)	Steve Nash (13)	Staples Center; 18,997	15–18
34	January 8	@ Houston	L 112–125	Metta World Peace (24)	Earl Clark (9)	Steve Nash (10)	Toyota Center; 18,135	15–19
35	January 9	@ San Antonio	L 105–108	Kobe Bryant (27)	Earl Clark (13)	Steve Nash (9)	AT&T Center; 18,581	15–20
36	January 11	Oklahoma City	L 101–116	Kobe Bryant (28)	Clark & Jamison (10)	Steve Nash (7)	Staples Center; 18,997	15–21
37	January 13	Cleveland	W 113–93	Kobe Bryant (23)	Dwight Howard (14)	Steve Nash (9)	Staples Center; 18,997	16–21
38	January 15	Milwaukee	W 104–88	Bryant & Howard (31)	Dwight Howard (16)	Steve Nash (11)	Staples Center; 18,997	17–21
39	January 17	Miami	L 90–99	Kobe Bryant (22)	Dwight Howard (16)	Steve Nash (7)	Staples Center; 18,997	17–22
40	January 20	@ Toronto	L 103–108	Kobe Bryant (26)	Earl Clark (14)	Steve Nash (9)	Air Canada Centre; 19,800	17–23
41	January 21	@ Chicago	L 83–95	Steve Nash (18)	Pau Gasol (12)	Steve Nash (6)	United Center; 22,550	17–24
42	January 23	@ Memphis	L 93–106	Kobe Bryant (29)	Earl Clark (9)	Steve Nash (8)	FedEx Forum; 17,984	17–25
43	January 25	Utah	W 102–84	Howard & World Peace (17)	Dwight Howard (13)	Kobe Bryant (14)	Staples Center; 18,997	18–25
44	January 27	Oklahoma City	W 105–96	Kobe Bryant (21)	Howard & World Peace (10)	Kobe Bryant (14)	Staples Center; 18,997	19–25
45	January 29	New Orleans	W 111–106	Dwight Howard (24)	Earl Clark (12)	Kobe Bryant (11)	Staples Center; 18,997	20–25
46	January 30	@ Phoenix	L 86–92	Kobe Bryant (17)	Dwight Howard (14)	Kobe Bryant (9)	US Airways Center; 17,184	20–26

February : 9–4 (home: 4–1; road: 5–3)

Game	Date	Team	Score	High points	High rebounds	High assists	Location Attendance	Record
47	February 1	@ Minnesota	W 111–100	Pau Gasol (22)	Bryant & Gasol (12)	Kobe Bryant (8)	Target Center; 18,547	21–26
48	February 3	@ Detroit	W 98–97	Pau Gasol (23)	Clark & Gasol (10)	Steve Nash (10)	The Palace of Auburn Hills; 18,157	22–26
49	February 5	@ Brooklyn	W 92–83	Kobe Bryant (21)	Earl Clark (12)	Steve Nash (8)	Barclays Center; 17,732	23–26
50	February 7	@ Boston	L 95–116	Kobe Bryant (27)	Dwight Howard (9)	Steve Nash (5)	TD Garden; 18,624	23–27
51	February 8	@ Charlotte	W 100–93	Kobe Bryant (20)	Dwight Howard (11)	Kobe Bryant (8)	Time Warner Cable Arena; 19,624	24–27
52	February 10	@ Miami	L 97–107	Kobe Bryant (28)	Clark & Howard (9)	Kobe Bryant (9)	American Airlines Arena; 20,300	24–28
53	February 12	Phoenix	W 91–85	Dwight Howard (19)	Dwight Howard (18)	Kobe Bryant (9)	Staples Center; 18,997	25–28
54	February 14	LA Clippers	L 101–125	Kobe Bryant (20)	Dwight Howard (8)	Kobe Bryant (11)	Staples Center; 18,997	25–29
All–Star Break
55	February 20	Boston	W 113–99	Dwight Howard (24)	Earl Clark (16)	Bryant & Nash (7)	Staples Center; 18,997	26–29
56	February 22	Portland	W 111–107	Kobe Bryant (40)	Dwight Howard (16)	Steve Nash (6)	Staples Center; 18,997	27–29
57	February 24	@ Dallas	W 103–99	Kobe Bryant (38)	Dwight Howard (13)	Kobe Bryant (7)	American Airlines Center; 20,440	28–29
58	February 25	@ Denver	L 108–119	Kobe Bryant (29)	Dwight Howard (14)	Kobe Bryant (9)	Pepsi Center; 19,155	28–30
59	February 28	Minnesota	W 116–94	Kobe Bryant (33)	Dwight Howard (13)	Steve Nash (7)	Staples Center; 18,997	29–30

March: 9–6 (home: 4–1; road: 5–5)

Game	Date	Team	Score	High points	High rebounds	High assists	Location Attendance	Record
60	March 3	Atlanta	W 99–98	Kobe Bryant (34)	Dwight Howard (15)	Steve Nash (10)	Staples Center; 18,997	30–30
61	March 5	@ Oklahoma City	L 105–122	Kobe Bryant (30)	Dwight Howard (16)	Steve Nash (4)	Chesapeake Energy Arena; 18,203	30–31
62	March 6	@ New Orleans	W 108–102	Kobe Bryant (42)	Dwight Howard (15)	Kobe Bryant (12)	New Orleans Arena; 16,019	31–31
63	March 8	Toronto	W 118–116 (OT)	Kobe Bryant (41)	Dwight Howard (13)	Kobe Bryant (12)	Staples Center; 18,997	32–31
64	March 10	Chicago	W 90–81	Kobe Bryant (19)	Dwight Howard (21)	Kobe Bryant (9)	Staples Center; 18,997	33–31
65	March 12	@ Orlando	W 106–97	Dwight Howard (39)	Dwight Howard (16)	Kobe Bryant (8)	Amway Center; 19,287	34–31
66	March 13	@ Atlanta	L 92–96	Kobe Bryant (31)	Dwight Howard (16)	Steve Nash (7)	Philips Arena; 19,163	34–32
67	March 15	@ Indiana	W 99–93	Dwight Howard (20)	Dwight Howard (12)	Steve Nash (9)	Bankers Life Fieldhouse; 18,165	35–32
68	March 17	Sacramento	W 113–102	Antawn Jamison (27)	Dwight Howard (17)	Steve Nash (12)	Staples Center; 18,997	36–32
69	March 18	@ Phoenix	L 76–99	Steve Nash (19)	Dwight Howard (11)	Nash & Blake (4)	US Airways Center; 17,102	36–33
70	March 22	Washington	L 100–103	Kobe Bryant (21)	Dwight Howard (15)	Kobe Bryant (11)	Staples Center; 18,997	36–34
71	March 25	@ Golden State	L 103–109	Kobe Bryant (36)	Dwight Howard (15)	Steve Nash (7)	Oracle Arena; 19,596	36–35
72	March 27	@ Minnesota	W 120–117	Kobe Bryant (31)	Dwight Howard (16)	Steve Nash (8)	Target Center; 18,029	37–35
73	March 28	@ Milwaukee	L 103–113	Kobe Bryant (30)	Dwight Howard (15)	Steve Nash (6)	BMO Harris Bradley Center; 16,884	37–36
74	March 30	@ Sacramento	W 103–98	Dwight Howard (24)	Dwight Howard (15)	Kobe Bryant (14)	Sleep Train Arena; 17,317	38–36

April : 7–1 (home: 6–0; road: 1–1)

Game	Date	Team	Score	High points	High rebounds	High assists	Location Attendance	Record
75	April 2	Dallas	W 101–81	Dwight Howard (24)	Howard & Clark (12)	Kobe Bryant (11)	Staples Center; 18,997	39–36
76	April 5	Memphis	W 86–84	Kobe Bryant (24)	Dwight Howard (10)	Kobe Bryant (9)	Staples Center; 18,997	40–36
77	April 7	@ LA Clippers	L 95–109	Howard & Bryant (25)	Pau Gasol (13)	Kobe Bryant (10)	Staples Center; 19,768	40–37
78	April 9	New Orleans	W 104–96	Kobe Bryant (30)	Pau Gasol (11)	Bryant & Blake (6)	Staples Center; 18,997	41–37
79	April 10	@ Portland	W 113–106	Kobe Bryant (47)	Dwight Howard (10)	Pau Gasol (9)	Rose Garden; 20,598	42–37
80	April 12	Golden State	W 118–116	Kobe Bryant (34)	Pau Gasol (11)	Pau Gasol (10)	Staples Center; 18,997	43–37
81	April 14	San Antonio	W 91–88	Dwight Howard (26)	Dwight Howard (17)	Blake, Meeks, & Morris (4)	Staples Center; 18,997	44–37
82	April 17	Houston	W 99–95 (OT)	Steve Blake (24)	Pau Gasol (20)	Pau Gasol (11)	Staples Center; 18,997	45–37

2012–13 season schedule

=== Playoffs ===
2013 playoff game log
Total: 0–4 (home: 0–2; road: 0–2)
First Round: 0–4 (home: 0–2; road: 0–2)

Game	Date	Team	Score	High points	High rebounds	High assists	Location Attendance	Series
1	April 21	@ San Antonio	L 79–91	Dwight Howard (20)	Pau Gasol (16)	Pau Gasol (6)	AT&T Center; 18,581	0–1
2	April 24	@ San Antonio	L 91–102	Blake & Howard (16)	Gasol & Howard (9)	Steve Nash (6)	AT&T Center; 18,581	0–2
3	April 26	San Antonio	L 89–120	Dwight Howard (25)	Pau Gasol (13)	Pau Gasol (10)	Staples Center; 18,997	0–3
4	April 28	San Antonio	L 82–103	Pau Gasol (16)	Gasol & Howard (8)	Chris Duhon (7)	Staples Center; 18,997	0–4

2013 playoff schedule

== Player statistics ==
Legend
GP	Games played	GS	Games started	MPG	Minutes per game
FG%	Field-goal percentage	3P%	3-point field-goal percentage	FT%	Free-throw percentage
RPG	Rebounds per game	APG	Assists per game	SPG	Steals per game
BPG	Blocks per game	PPG	Points per game

=== Regular season ===
Player	GP	GS	MPG	FG%	3P%	FT%	RPG	APG	SPG	BPG	PPG
Steve Blake	45	13	26.1	.422	.421	.771	2.9	3.8	.8	.1	7.3
Kobe Bryant	78	78	38.6	.463	.324	.839	5.6	6.0	1.4	.3	27.3
Earl Clark	59	36	23.1	.440	.337	.697	5.5	1.1	.6	.7	7.3
Chris Duhon	46	9	17.8	.382	.363	.462	1.5	2.9	.4	.0	2.9
Devin Ebanks	19	3	10.4	.329	.273	.786	2.2	.5	.2	.1	3.4
Pau Gasol	49	42	33.8	.466	.286	.702	8.6	4.1	.5	1.2	13.7
Andrew Goudelock	1	0	6.0	.000	.	.	1.0	.0	.0	.0	.0
Jordan Hill	29	1	15.8	.497	.000	.656	5.7	.4	.3	.7	6.7
Dwight Howard	76	76	35.8	.578	.167	.492	12.4	1.4	1.1	2.4	17.1
Josh McRoberts	50	6	14.4	.475	.429	.639	3.4	1.0	.3	.4	2.8
Antawn Jamison	76	6	21.5	.464	.361	.691	4.8	.7	.4	.3	9.4
Darius Johnson-Odom	4	0	1.5	.000	.000	.	1.0	.3	.0	.0	.0
Jodie Meeks	78	10	21.3	.387	.357	.896	2.2	.9	.7	.1	7.9
Darius Morris	48	17	14.2	.388	.364	.649	1.2	1.6	.4	.0	4.0
Steve Nash	50	50	32.5	.497	.438	.922	2.8	6.7	.6	.1	12.7
Robert Sacre	32	3	6.3	.375	.	.636	1.1	.2	.0	.3	1.3
Metta World Peace	75	66	33.7	.403	.342	.734	5.0	1.5	1.6	.6	12.4

=== Playoffs ===
Player	GP	GS	MPG	FG%	3P%	FT%	RPG	APG	SPG	BPG	PPG
Steve Blake	2	2	37.5	.393	.417	1.000	4.0	2.5	2.0	1.5	14.0
Earl Clark	4	1	20.5	.368	.000	.	3.0	.3	.3	.3	3.5
Chris Duhon	2	0	34.0	.364	.375	.	1.5	3.5	1.0	.5	5.5
Pau Gasol	4	4	36.5	.481	.	.545	11.5	6.5	.5	.8	14.0
Andrew Goudelock	3	2	26.7	.444	.200	1.000	1.7	1.0	1.7	.0	12.0
Jordan Hill	3	0	10.3	.500	.	.	3.7	.3	.0	.7	3.3
Dwight Howard	4	4	31.5	.619	.	.444	10.8	1.0	.5	2.0	17.0
Antawn Jamison	4	0	19.8	.435	.417	.667	1.8	.3	.3	.5	7.3
Jodie Meeks	1	0	20.0	.250	.000	1.000	2.0	.0	1.0	.0	4.0
Darius Morris	4	2	26.3	.457	.333	.778	1.3	3.0	.5	.0	10.5
Steve Nash	2	2	30.5	.435	.000	1.000	2.5	4.5	.0	.0	12.5
Robert Sacre	2	0	2.0	.000	.	.	1.0	.0	.5	.0	.0
Metta World Peace	3	3	28.0	.250	.143	1.000	3.7	1.7	.7	.3	6.0

== Awards, records and milestones ==
=== Awards ===
==== Week/Month ====
Western Conference Player of the Week
Week	Winner	Ref.
Feb. 19 – Feb. 24	Kobe Bryant (1/3)	
Mar. 4 – Mar. 10	Kobe Bryant (2/3)	
Apr. 8 – Apr. 14	Kobe Bryant (3/3)	

Western Conference Player of the Month
Month	Winner	Ref.
February	Kobe Bryant	

Western Conference Coach of the Month
Month	Winner	Ref.
April	Mike D'Antoni	

==== All-Star ====
- Kobe Bryant was voted as an All-Star starter for the 15th consecutive time.
- Dwight Howard made his seventh consecutive All-Star appearance at the 2013 NBA All-Star Game held in Houston.

==== All-NBA ====
Bryant was named All-NBA First Team for the 11th time in his career, his 15th overall selection. Howard was named to the Third Team.

=== Records ===
- In a March 12, 2013 game against his former team, the Orlando Magic, Dwight Howard tied his own NBA record of 39 free throw attempts. He made 25 of the 39 attempts. He had previously set the league mark with 39 free throw attempts in a game while playing for the Orlando Magic vs. the Golden State Warriors on January 12, 2012.
- Dwight Howard led the league in defensive rebounds for the sixth consecutive season and sixth season overall in his career, both league records. He led the NBA in defensive rebounds every season starting with the 2007–08 season.

=== Milestones ===
- November 18: Pau Gasol scored his 15,000th career point in a game against the Houston Rockets.
- December 5: Kobe Bryant scored his 30,000th career point in a win against the New Orleans Hornets.
- December 5: Metta World Peace became the 6th player to record 12,000 points, 4,000 rebounds, 1,500 steals, and 1,000 3-pointers made in a win against New Orleans.
- January 8, 2013: Steve Nash became the fifth player in NBA history to reach 10,000 career assists.
- January 20: Dwight Howard recorded his 1,000th career assist in a loss against the Toronto Raptors.
- March 30: Bryant passed Wilt Chamberlain's career point total of 31,419 in a win against the Sacramento Kings to become the fourth-highest scorer in NBA history.
- April 17: Howard became the youngest player in NBA history to reach 9,000 career rebounds in a win against the Houston Rockets.

== Transactions ==
=== Overview ===
Players added

Via draft

- Darius Johnson-Odom
- Robert Sacre

Via free agency

- Antawn Jamison
- Jodie Meeks

Via trade

- Steve Nash
- Dwight Howard
- Earl Clark
- Chris Duhon
Players lost

Via trade

- Andrew Bynum
- Josh McRoberts
- Christian Eyenga

Via free agency

- Ramon Sessions
- Matt Barnes

Waived

=== Additions ===
Additions
Player	Date acquired	Reason acquired	Former team
Steve Nash	July 11	Sign-and-trade	Phoenix Suns
Jordan Hill	July 25	Re-signed	Los Angeles Lakers
Antawn Jamison	July 25	Free Agency	Cleveland Cavaliers
Dwight Howard	August 10	Trade	Orlando Magic
Chris Duhon	August 10	Trade	Orlando Magic
Earl Clark	August 10	Trade	Orlando Magic
Jodie Meeks	August 13	Free Agency	Philadelphia 76ers
Devin Ebanks	August 13	Re-signed	Los Angeles Lakers
Greg Somogyi	September 5	Undrafted	Santa Barbara Breakers (WCBL)
Reeves Nelson	September 5	Free Agency	Žalgiris Kaunas (Lithuania)
Robert Sacre	September 7	Draft Pick	Gonzaga (Sr.)
Darius Johnson-Odom	September 15	Draft Pick	Marquette (Sr.)
Ronnie Aguilar	September 26	Undrafted	Bakersfield Jam (NBA Development League)
Chris Douglas-Roberts	October 1	Free Agent	Virtus Bologna (Italy)
Andrew Goudelock	April 14	Free Agent	Rio Grande Valley Vipers (D-League)

=== Subtractions ===
Subtractions
Player	Reason left	Date left	New team
Troy Murphy	Free Agency	July 1	N/A
Ramon Sessions	Free Agency	July 13	Charlotte Bobcats
Andrew Bynum	Trade	August 10	Philadelphia Sixers
Josh McRoberts	Trade	August 10	Orlando Magic
Christian Eyenga	Trade	August 10	Orlando Magic
Matt Barnes	Free Agency	September 14	Los Angeles Clippers
Ronnie Aguilar	Waived	October 20	N/A
Reeves Nelson	Waived	October 20	N/A
Chris Douglas-Roberts	Waived	October 22	Texas Legends(D-League)
Greg Somogyi	Waived	October 22	CB Coruña(LEB Plata)
Andrew Goudelock	Waived	October 27	Sioux Falls Skyforce(D-League)
Darius Johnson-Odom	Waived	January 7	BC Spartak Saint Petersburg(PBL)

=== Trades ===
June 28, 2012
To Los Angeles Lakers

- Rights to Darius Johnson-Odom
To Dallas Mavericks

- Cash Considerations
July 11, 2012
To Los Angeles Lakers

- Steve Nash
To Phoenix Suns

- Lakers 2015 first-round pick (top 5 protected)
- Lakers 2014 second-round pick
- Denver's 2013 second-round pick
August 10, 2012
To Los Angeles Lakers

- Dwight Howard
- Earl Clark
- Chris Duhon
To Orlando Magic

- Josh McRoberts
- Christian Eyenga
- Lakers 2017 first-round pick
To Philadelphia 76ers

- Andrew Bynum

==== Future draft picks ====
===== Credits =====
2013 second-round draft pick from Memphis

Memphis' own 2013 second-round pick to the L.A. Lakers (top 55 protected in the 2013 Draft). If Memphis' own 2013 second-round pick is in the top 55 picks, then Memphis' obligations to the L.A. Lakers shall be extinguished. [L.A. Lakers – Memphis, February 18, 2009]

===== Debits =====
2013 first round draft pick to Phoenix

The L.A. Lakers will send the least favorable of their own 1st round pick (top-14 protected), Cleveland's own 2013 1st round pick, Sacramento's own 1st round pick (top-13 protected) and Miami's 2013 1st round pick to Phoenix. If the L.A. Lakers' 1st round pick is within the top-14 selections, Phoenix will automatically receive the L.A. Lakers' 1st round pick. [L.A. Lakers-Phoenix, 7/11/2012]

2013 first round draft pick to Cleveland

Cleveland has the right to swap the least favorable of their own 2013 1st round pick, Miami's own 2013 1st round pick (top-10 protected) and Sacramento's own 2013 1st round pick (top-13 protected) with the L.A. Lakers own 2013 first round pick (top-14 protected). If the L.A. Lakers own 2013 first round pick is #1-#14, then the L.A. Lakers' obligation to Cleveland shall be extinguished. [Cleveland-L.A. Lakers, 3/15/2012]

2013 second round draft pick to Dallas

Dallas has the right to swap their own 2013 2nd round pick with the L.A. Lakers' own 2013 2nd round pick. [Dallas-L.A. Lakers, 12/11/2011]

2014 second round draft pick to Minnesota

The L.A. Lakers' own 2014 2nd round pick to Minnesota via Phoenix. [L.A. Lakers-Phoenix, 7/11/2012 and then Minnesota-New Orleans-Phoenix, 7/27/2012]

2015 first round draft pick to Phoenix

The L.A. Lakers own 2015 1st round pick to Phoenix. [L.A. Lakers-Phoenix, 7/11/2012]

2015 second round draft pick to Orlando

The L.A. Lakers' own 2015 2nd round draft pick to Orlando (Top-40 Protected). If The L.A. Lakers' own 2015 2nd round pick is within the top-40 selections, then The L.A. Lakers' obligation to Orlando shall be extinguished. [Denver – L.A. Lakers – Orlando – Philadelphia, 8/10/2012]

2017 first round draft pick to Orlando

The L.A. Lakers' own 2017 1st round draft pick to Orlando (Top-5 Protected). If The L.A. Lakers' own 2017 1st round pick is within the top-5 selections, then the L.A. Lakers will convey their own second round picks in 2017 and 2018 to Orlando. [L.A. Lakers – Orlando, 8/10/2012]
