= Sports in Orange County, California =

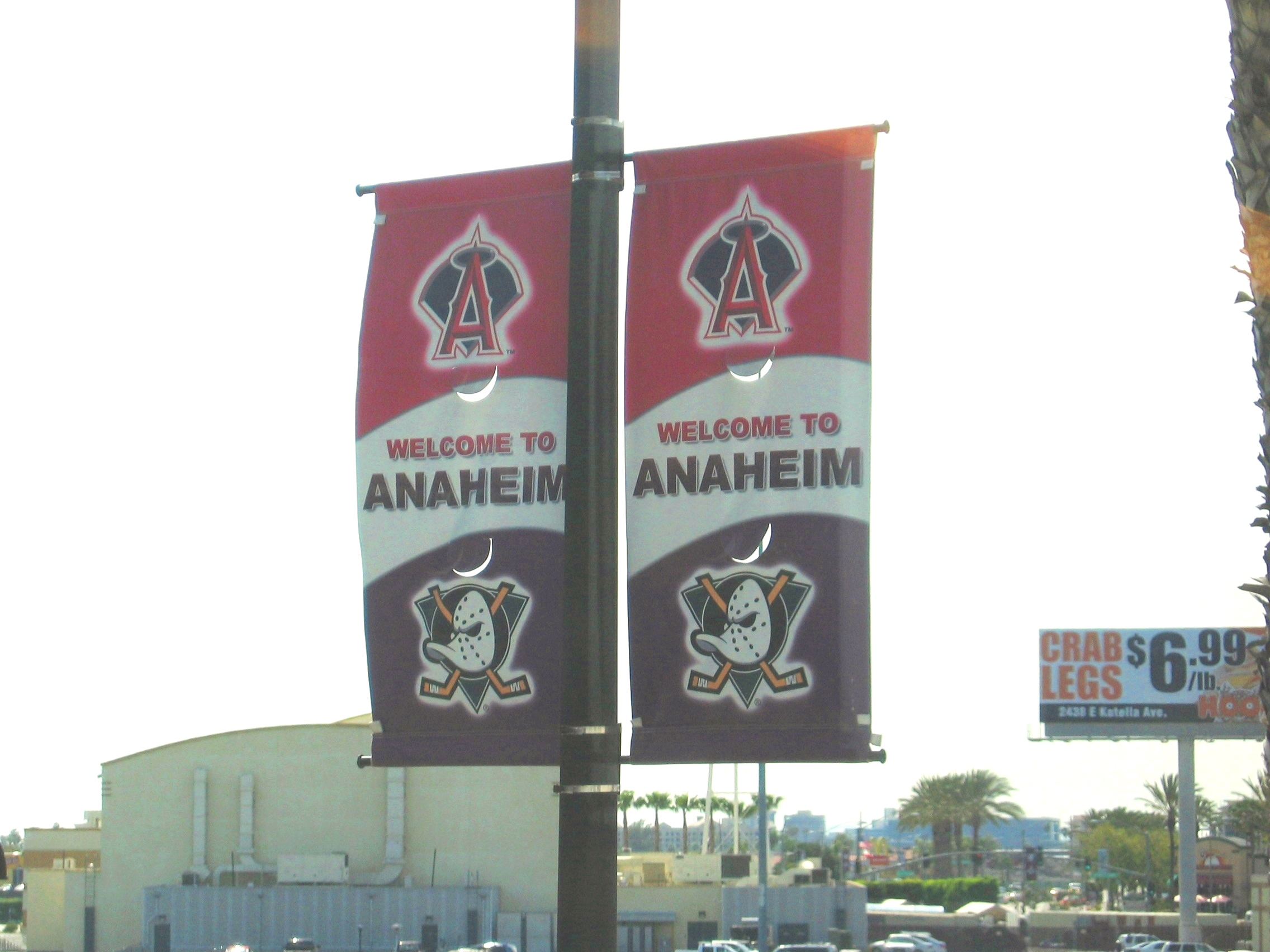
Street banners promoting the county's two major league teams, the Ducks and the Angels.

Sports in Orange County, California includes a number of sports teams and sports competitions. Within Orange County, the city of Anaheim currently hosts two major league sports teams — MLB's Los Angeles Angels and the NHL's Anaheim Ducks — and used to host two others.

== Major league sports teams ==
The Major League Baseball team in Orange County is the Los Angeles Angels. After playing its first six seasons in Los Angeles, the team, at the time known as the California Angels, began playing at the new Anaheim Stadium where they have remained ever since. Changing their name to the Anaheim Angels, the club won its first American League pennant in 2002, then defeated the San Francisco Giants in the World Series under manager Mike Scioscia. In 2005, new owner Arte Moreno wanted to change the name to "Los Angeles Angels" in order to better tap into the Los Angeles media market, the second-largest in the country. However, the standing agreement with the city of Anaheim demanded that they have "Anaheim" in the name, so they became the Los Angeles Angels of Anaheim. This name change was hotly disputed by the city of Anaheim, prompting a lawsuit by the city of Anaheim against Angels owner Arte Moreno, won by Moreno. By the 2016 season, the club dropped Anaheim from its name and reverted to its original name the Los Angeles Angels though the team often doesn't refer to any geographic identifier in marketing or merchandise.

The county's National Hockey League team, the Anaheim Ducks, first began play in 1993 as an expansion team. Owned first by the Disney Corporation, the club was first known as the Anaheim Mighty Ducks (in honor of the popular Disney film The Mighty Ducks) and first made the NHL playoffs during the 1996-97 season. The Mighty Ducks earned their first conference championship in the 2002-03 season and came close to winning the Stanley Cup finals, losing 4-3 in a hard-fought seven-game series against the New Jersey Devils. For the 2006-07 season, the club changed its name to the Anaheim Ducks and went on to win its first (and to date, only) Stanley Cup beating the Ottawa Senators 4-1. From 1996-97 to 2017-18, the Ducks franchise reached the NHL playoffs 14 times in 21 seasons. In 2025-26, the club made their return to the playoffs for the first time after a seven season drought. Throughout its history, the Ducks have played at the Honda Center, previously known as the Arrowhead Pond of Anaheim from 1993 to 2006.

The Los Angeles Rams of the National Football League played in Anaheim Stadium from 1980 until 1995 when the team left the county after relocating to St. Louis. However, upon the Chargers relocation to Los Angeles a year after the Rams' return to Southern California in 2017, they established headquarters in Costa Mesa, despite playing across the county line in Los Angeles County until 2024 when they moved their headquarters to El Segundo.

The Los Angeles Clippers played some home games at The Arrowhead Pond, now known as the Honda Center, from 1994 to 1999, before moving to Staples Center, which they shared with the Los Angeles Lakers from 1999 to 2024 after which they moved into their own arena, Intuit Dome.

== Competitions ==
Huntington Beach annually plays host to the U.S. Open of Surfing, AVP Pro Beach Volleyball and Vans World Championship of Skateboarding. It was also the shooting location for Pro Beach Hockey. USA Water Polo, Inc. has moved its headquarters offices to Huntington Beach. Orange County's active outdoor culture is home to many surfers, skateboarders, mountain bikers, triathletes, cyclists, climbers, hikers, kayaking, sailing and sand volleyball.

The Hoag Classic (formerly the Toshiba Classic), the only PGA Champions Tour event in the area, is held each March at The Newport Beach Country Club. Past champions include Fred Couples (2010 and 2014), Hale Irwin (1998 and 2002), Nick Price (2011), Bernhard Langer (2008), and Jay Haas (2007 and 2016). The tournament benefits the Hoag Hospital Foundation and raised over $16 million in its first 16 years.

Several cities and venues were used throughout the 1984 Los Angeles XXIII Summer Olympic Games, including the running of the Olympic torch throughout the county as it made its way up to Los Angeles for the games.

- Mission Viejo, Orange County, California – cycling (individual road race)
- Fairbanks Ranch Country Club, Rancho Santa Fe, California, California – equestrian sports (eventing endurance)
- Titan Gymnasium, California State University, Fullerton, Fullerton, California – handball
- Coto de Caza, Orange County, California – modern pentathlon (fencing, riding, running, shooting)
- Anaheim Convention Center, Anaheim, California – wrestling

Multiple cities and venues are also planned to be used for the 2028 Los Angeles XXXIV Summer Olympic Games.

- Honda Center, Anaheim– volleyball
- Trestles, south San Clemente – surfing

== Other sports teams ==
Orange County SC, formerly known as Orange County Blues FC, is a United Soccer League team and is the only professional soccer club in Orange County. They currently play at Championship Soccer Stadium located at in Irvine. The team's first season was in 2011 and it was successful as Charlie Naimo's team made it to the quarter-finals of the playoffs. Former and current Blues players include Walter Gaitan, Bright Dike, Maykel Galindo, Carlos Borja, and goalkeeper Amir Abedzadeh.

Orange County Riptide, a semi-professional collegiate summer baseball team plays in the California Collegiate League. They play their home games at Championship Baseball Stadium at Irvine's Great Park. The team was founded in 2015 and began play in 2016. Since then, five Riptide alumni have debuted in Major League Baseball: Caleb Kilian, Dominic Fletcher, Trey Lipscomb, Hunter Bigge, and Eric Wagaman.

In 2027, a new team is set to enter the independent, MLB-partnered Pioneer League playing at Championship Baseball Stadium at Great Park. The currently unnamed team is set to feature "a ballpark experience drawing on the stadium cultures of Nippon Professional Baseball in Japan and the Korea Baseball Organization in South Korea."

Since 2006, the Orange County Roller Derby, a flat track league, has been competing against teams from up and down the great state of California and across the Country. In 2010 they built the 9th banked track to compete at the Anaheim Convention Center Arena. They currently play their home matches at The Rinks, Irvine.

On June 24, 2026, the United States Hockey League announced the addition of six new West Coast markets targeted to launch teams by the 2027-28 season, along with the owners of the teams. One of the teams, owned by John Moreland and former Anaheim Duck and Hockey Hall of Famer Teemu Selanne, is set to play in Orange County.

== Former and defunct sports teams ==
=== Baseball ===
In 1910, the Santa Ana Walnut Growers joined the short-lived Class D Southern California Trolley League, competing in eleven games before the league ultimately folded. The team was briefly revived in 1929 as the Santa Ana Orange Countians in the third iteration of the California State League before that league also disbanded. Both teams played at Hawley Park.

Professional baseball made brief appearances in Orange County during the 1940s in minor league ball when the Anaheim Aces played a single season in 1941 in the then new California League. They played their home games at La Palma Park in Anaheim. The Anaheim Valencias of the Class C Sunset League played the 1947 and 1948 seasons, also at La Palma Park. Future Fullerton High School baseball coach Bud Dawson was the Vals' shortstop. The stadium was also used by the Philadelphia Athletics (1940-1942) and St. Louis Browns (1946) as a Spring training home.

In 1997 and 1998, the Mission Viejo Vigilantes competed in the independent Western Baseball League and played their games at Saddleback College. The team was managed by longtime MLB manager Buck Rodgers.

The Fullerton Flyers played in Orange County from 2005 - 2012. Over the years, the Flyers were managed by local and notable former Major League Baseball players including Gary Templeton, Gary Carter, Phil Nevin and Paul Abbott.

The Orange County Pioneers and California Mariners/Sharks/Storm of Irvine and Newport Beach, were semi-pro collegiate baseball teams in the 1990s and 2000s.

=== Basketball ===
The Anaheim Arsenal were an NBA D-League team from the 2006 to 2009. They played their home games at the Anaheim Convention Center. The team would later relocate to become the Springfield Armor in Springfield, Massachusetts.

Anaheim was also the home of the prior American Basketball Association franchise known as the Anaheim Amigos in the mid-sixties. They played their home games at the Anaheim Convention Center.

The county was home of the Southern California Surf American Basketball Association (ABA) basketball team from 2001 to 2002 in Anaheim. The Orange County Crush/Orange County Buzz American Basketball Association basketball team played in Orange County from 2004 to 2006. The Crush/Buzz played their home games at the Fairgrounds Grandstand Arena in Costa Mesa.

The Orange County Gladiators were also an American Basketball Association (ABA) expansion team starting in November 2007 until 2009. The team also played in the West Coast Pro Basketball League. They played their home games at Fieldhouse Gym at JSerra in San Juan Capistrano and at Aliso Niguel High School in Aliso Viejo, California.

The Newport Beach Surf played in Anaheim at the American Sports Centers from 2008 to 2013 in the West Coast Pro Basketball League.

The California Dreams played in the Women's Professional Basketball League from 1979 to 1980 at the Anaheim Convention Center.

=== Football ===
In the late 1950s (c.1957–59) the Orange County Rhinos, a semi-pro football team, played their home games at La Palma Park in Anaheim.

The Anaheim Piranhas were an Arena Football League team in 1996–97, but folded due to team board financial problems.

The Southern California Sun was an American football team based out of Anaheim that played in the World Football League in 1974 and 1975. Their records were 13–7 in 1974 and 7–5 in 1975. Their home stadium was Anaheim Stadium.

The Orange County Ramblers were a professional football team that competed in the Continental Football League from 1967 to 1968. The Ramblers played their home games in Anaheim (Anaheim Stadium). The team was coached both seasons by Homer Beatty, who had won a small college national title at Santa Ana College in 1962.

The Santa Ana Winds, a women's professional football team played in Santa Ana College and later Chapman College in Orange in the 2000s.

=== Soccer ===
The California Surf played in the North American Soccer League from 1978 to 1981. The club called Anaheim Stadium home.

Another soccer franchise, the California Sunshine of the American Soccer League in the late 1970s played games in Orange and Anaheim (Anaheim Stadium). Their team office was in Villa Park.

The Los Angeles Salsa played at Cal State Fullerton's Titan Stadium in 1993–94 in the American Professional Soccer League (APSL), at the time the top soccer league in the U.S. The Salsa, whose general manager was former Cosmos star Ricky Davis and its coach former Brazil star Rildo Menezes, also played some games at East Los Angeles College in Monterey Park, California, and Trabuco Hills High School, Mission Viejo, California attempting a season in Mexico's second-tier Primera A Division. That attempt was cancelled after several games when FIFA and CONCACAF ruled a club could not play in two leagues in separate countries. The Salsa lost to the Colorado Foxes in the 1993 APSL final at Cal State Fullerton.

The Orange County Blue Star, affiliated with MLS's Los Angeles Galaxy, played soccer at Santa Ana Stadium (also known as Santa Ana Bowl) and Orange Coast College from 1997 to 2000.

The Anaheim Splash was a soccer team that played in the Continental Indoor Soccer League from 1993 to 1997.

A semi-pro Mexican Soccer franchise, the Santa Ana-Anaheim Aztecas played in Santa Ana College in the 2000s.

=== Other sports ===
The Anaheim Storm was a member of the National Lacrosse League. They folded in 2005 due to low attendance.

The Anaheim Bullfrogs were a Roller Hockey International team that lasted from 1993 to 1999 and were briefly revived in 2001.

In December 2015, the Orange County Breakers of Mylan World TeamTennis announced they would be returning to Newport Beach after moving to Austin, Texas and playing as the Austin Aces for two seasons. The Breakers were, at the time, the only form of professional tennis in the greater Orange County and Los Angeles metropolitan areas. The franchise, which won the 2004 Mylan WTT Championship, boasted a rich player history that included former world #1 players such as Maria Sharapova, Pete Sampras, Lindsay Davenport and the Bryan brothers. The Breakers, who were coached by nine-time Grand Slam Champion and former world #1 doubles player Rick Leach, played their home matches at Newport Beach Tennis Club and Palisades Tennis Club. The team ceased operations when the league folded in 2021.
