= Tony Farmer (basketball, born 1970) =

American basketball player

Personal information
- Born: January 3, 1970 (age 56) Los Angeles, California, U.S.
- Listed height: 6 ft 9 in (2.06 m)
- Listed weight: 244 lb (111 kg)

Career information
- High school: Artesia (Lakewood, California)
- College: San Jose State (1987–1989); Nebraska (1990–1991)
- NBA draft: 1991: undrafted
- Playing career: 1991–2013
- Position: Center / power forward
- Number: 22, 8

Career history
- 1991–1992: Sioux Falls Skyforce
- 1992: Columbus Horizon
- 1992–1993: Rochester Renegade
- 1993: CB Breogán
- 1993: Pau Orthez
- 1993: Fort Wayne Fury
- 1993: Dinamo Sassari
- 1994: Sioux Falls Skyforce
- 1994–1995: Cholet Basket
- 1995–1996: Besançon BCD
- 1996–1997: Florida Beach Dogs
- 1997: CB Murcia
- 1997: Vaqueros de Bayamón
- 1997–1998: Charlotte Hornets
- 1998: Criollos de Caguas
- 1998–1999: Atenas Córdoba
- 1999: BC Oostende
- 1999: Leones de Ponce
- 1999–2000: Golden State Warriors
- 2000: Leones de Ponce
- 2000: Iraklis Thessaloniki
- 2000–2001: Los Angeles Stars
- 2001: Besançon BCD
- 2001: Criollos de Caguas
- 2001–2002: Lokomotiv Kuban
- 2003: Maratonistas de Coamo
- 2004–2005: Utah Snowbears
- 2005–2007: Tijuana Dragons
- 2007–2009: Galgos de Tijuana
- 2009–2010: Las Vegas Aces
- 2010: Orange County Gladiators
- 2010–2011: California Beach Ballers
- 2011: Newport Beach Surf
- 2012: Long Beach Rockets
- 2012–2013: Los Angeles Slam
- Stats at NBA.com
- Stats at Basketball Reference

Anthony Todd Farmer (born January 3, 1970) is an American former basketball player in the National Basketball Association (NBA).

A 6'9 forward born in Los Angeles, California and from the University of Nebraska–Lincoln, Farmer appeared in 304 games in the NBA between 1996 and 2000. He was a member of the Charlotte Hornets and Golden State Warriors, and averaged a career-high 6.3 points and four rebounds per game during the 1999–2000 season with Golden State. In the 2000–01 season Farmer played for Iraklis Thessaloniki, averaging 13.8 points and 9.0 rebounds per game in the SuproLeague. Farmer has also played in the CBA, ABA, France, Italy, and Russia. In June 2007, he was signed as a player-coach by the Orange County Gladiators of the ABA. He played in France, Italy, Greece, Spain, and Russia. He also played with the Miami Heat in 1996–97. Farmer played in Puerto Rico as well and was voted to the All DecadeTeam as one of the best imports to ever play in the BSN League. He won a championship in France with Besançon BBC
