= Robert Sacre =

American-Canadian basketball player (born 1989)

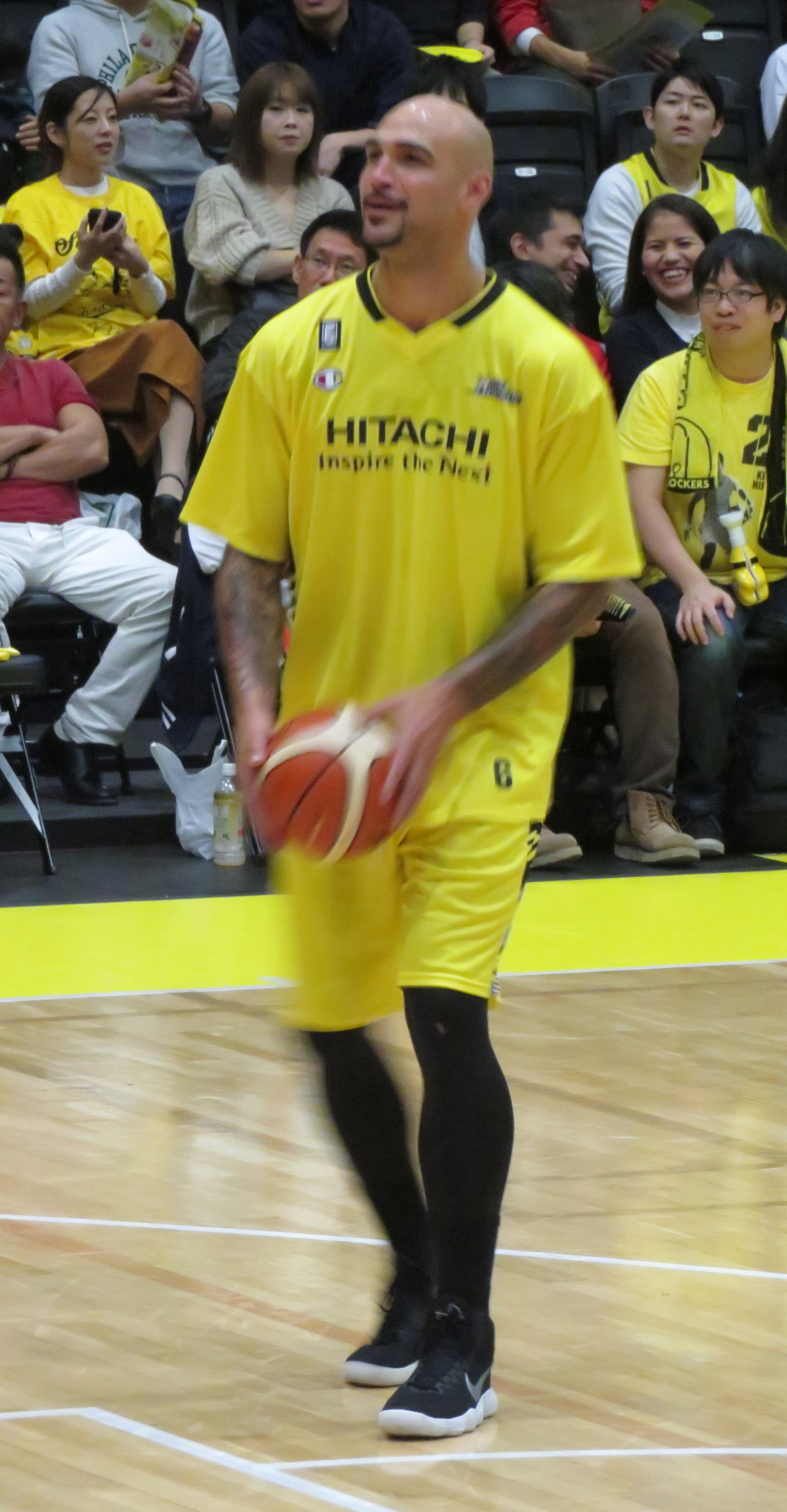
- Sacre with the Sun Rockers in 2018

Vancouver Bandits
- Title: Assistant general manager
- League: CEBL

Personal information
- Born: June 6, 1989 (age 37) Baton Rouge, Louisiana, U.S.
- Listed height: 7 ft 0 in (2.13 m)
- Listed weight: 270 lb (122 kg)

Career information
- High school: Handsworth Secondary School (North Vancouver, British Columbia)
- College: Gonzaga (2007–2012)
- NBA draft: 2012: 2nd round, 60th overall pick
- Drafted by: Los Angeles Lakers
- Playing career: 2012–2019
- Position: Center
- Number: 50, 6

Career history
- 2012–2016: Los Angeles Lakers
- 2012–2013: →Los Angeles D-Fenders
- 2017–2019: Hitachi SunRockers Tokyo-Shibuya

Career highlights
- 2× First-team All-WCC (2011, 2012); WCC Defensive Player of the Year (2012)
- Stats at NBA.com
- Stats at Basketball Reference
Medals
Men's basketball
Representing Canada
FIBA AmeriCup
Bronze medal – third place	2015 Mexico City

Robert Sacre (born June 6, 1989) is a Former American-Canadian professional basketball player who is the assistant general manager for the Vancouver Bandits of the Canadian Elite Basketball League (CEBL). A dual citizen of the United States and Canada, he has played for the Canadian national basketball team. After playing college basketball for the Gonzaga Bulldogs, he was selected by the Los Angeles Lakers with the last overall pick in the second round of the 2012 NBA draft. He played four seasons with the Lakers and three seasons with the Sun Rockers Shibuya in Japan.

== Early life ==
Sacre was born in the United States in Baton Rouge, Louisiana to former National Football League player Greg LaFleur and former LSU Lady Tigers college basketball player Leslie Sacre. His mother, a Canadian, moved back to Canada when Sacre was seven, and raised her son as a single mother. Sacre grew up in North Vancouver, British Columbia, and he was 6 feet 8 inches (2.03 m) by the eighth grade. Leslie only insisted that he learn to swim, and she did not push him to play basketball.

Sacre was one of the top high school players in Canada. In his junior year, he led Handsworth Secondary School to the British Columbia Provincial Championship; he was named MVP of the title game after scoring 17 points, grabbing 12 rebounds, and blocking four shots. In that same year he was selected to play for the Canadian Junior National team at the 2005 Global Games and the 2006 World Championship qualifiers. In his senior year he averaged 25 points, 12 rebounds, and four and a half blocks per game.

Considered a four-star recruit by Rivals.com, Sacre was listed as the No. 10 center and the No. 102 player in the nation in 2007.

== College career ==
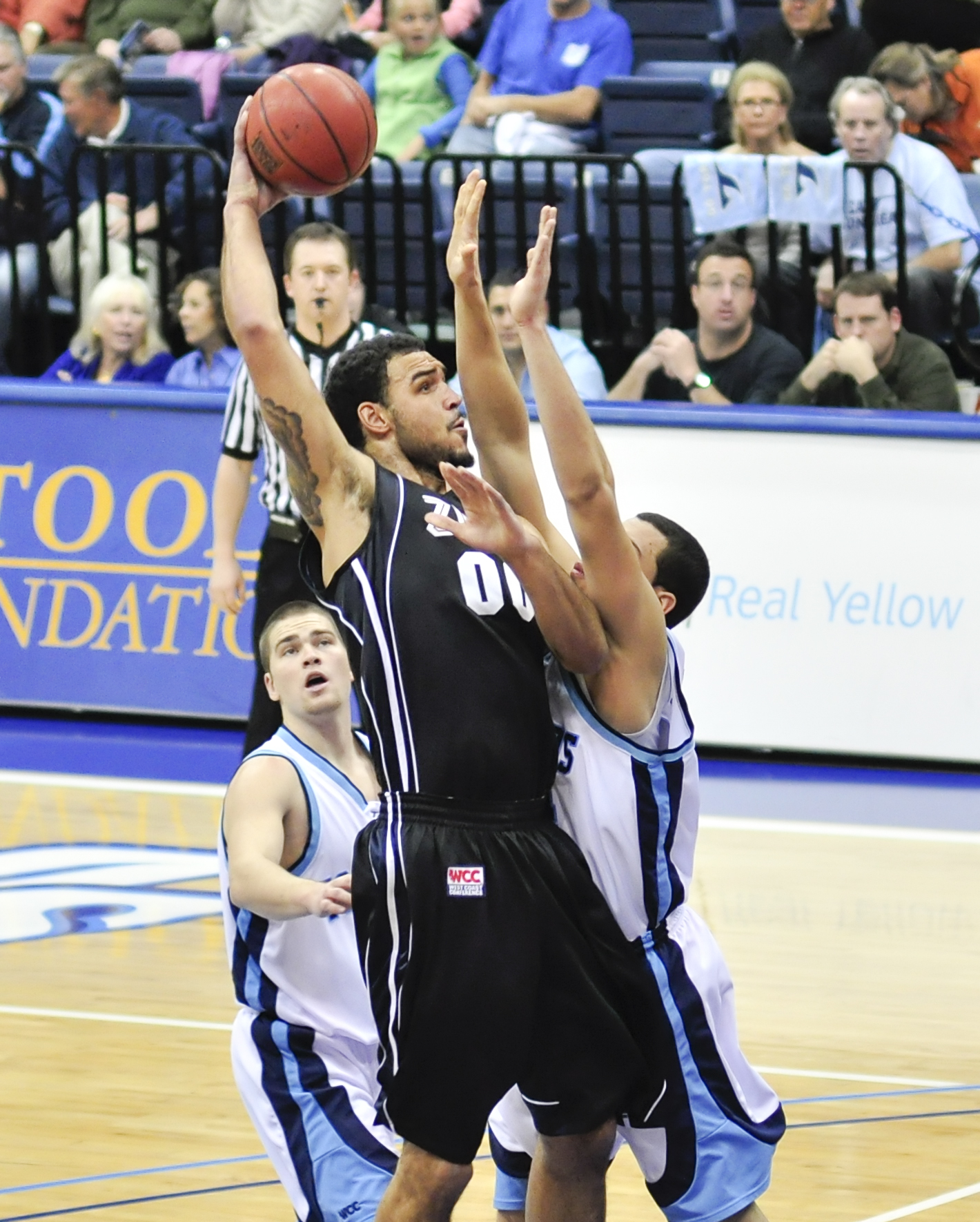
Sacre takes a hook shot while playing for Gonzaga

Sacre committed to NCAA Division I squad Gonzaga University prior to the 2007–08 season. He came off the bench in his freshman season, averaging nine minutes of action per game in 2007–08. In 2008–09, he broke his foot three games into the season and was later granted a medical redshirt.

Sacre came back strong in the 2009–10 season, averaging 10.3 points, 5.4 rebounds, and 1.9 blocks per game as the Bulldogs' starting centre.

In 2012, Sacre finished his career with 1,270 points. He also grabbed 679 career rebounds and had 186 career blocks.

== Professional career ==
=== Los Angeles Lakers (2012–2016) ===
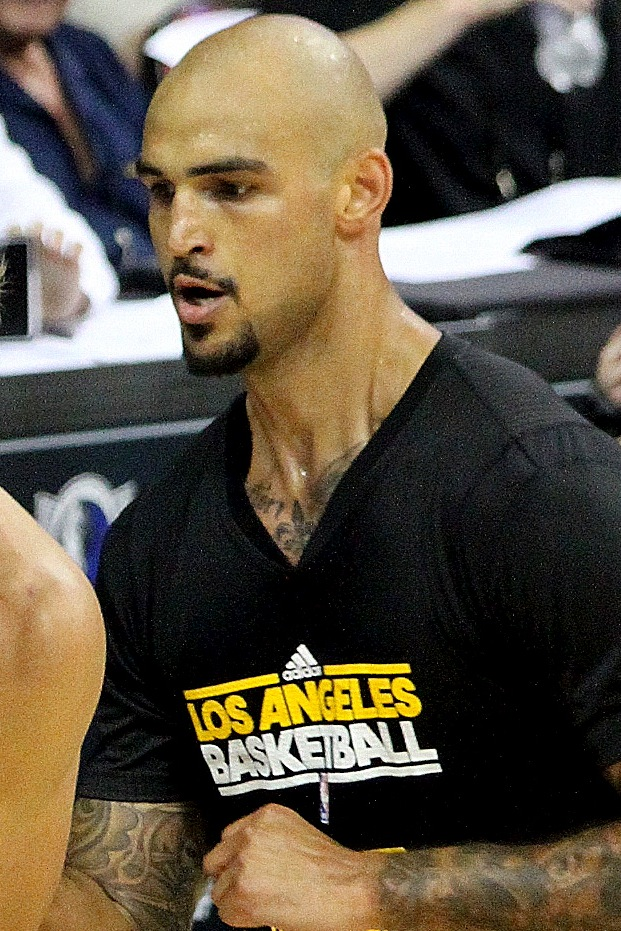
Sacre during the 2013 NBA Summer League

On June 28, 2012, the Los Angeles Lakers selected Sacre with the last pick (60th) in the 2012 NBA draft. After joining the Lakers for the 2012 NBA Summer League, he signed with the Lakers on September 7. On October 31, he made his NBA debut against the Portland Trail Blazers, playing 49 seconds in a 116–106 loss. He scored his first points on November 4, 2012, in a victory against the Detroit Pistons. On January 8, 2013, Sacre made his first career start, finishing with 10 points, four blocked shots and three rebounds in a 125–112 loss to the Houston Rockets. During his rookie season, he had multiple assignments with the Los Angeles D-Fenders of the NBA Development League.

On July 10, 2013, Sacre re-signed with the Lakers to a three-year deal and joined them for the 2013 NBA Summer League. On February 5, 2014, Sacre was involved in a bizarre game after receiving his sixth foul during a game against the Cleveland Cavaliers. The Lakers had dressed eight players, losing guards Jordan Farmar and Nick Young to injury during the course of the game. With Chris Kaman having already fouled out and coach Mike D'Antoni electing not to play Steve Nash, the Lakers roster had been trimmed down to four eligible players after Sacre committed his sixth foul. In accordance to league rules, Sacre was allowed to stay in the game after being assessed a technical foul on top of the sixth personal foul he committed.

On September 22, 2016, Sacre signed with the New Orleans Pelicans. However, he was later waived by the Pelicans on October 21 after appearing in one preseason game.

=== Sun Rockers Shibuya (2017–2019) ===
On January 7, 2017, Sacre signed with Hitachi SunRockers Tokyo-Shibuya of the Japanese B.League.

== Executive career ==
On March 11, 2021, Sacre was announced as the assistant general manager for the Fraser Valley Bandits of the Canadian Elite Basketball League (CEBL).

== National team career ==
Sacre played several tournaments for the Canadian junior team. He averaged 9 points, 8.2 rebounds, and 3 blocks per game at the 2006 FIBA Americas Under-18 Championship, helping the Canadians to a fourth-place finish in the tournament. Sacre was called to the senior national team for the first time to participate at the 2010 FIBA World Championship in Turkey. He also played at the 2015 FIBA Americas Championship in Mexico.

== Career statistics ==
Legend
GP	Games played	GS	Games started	MPG	Minutes per game
FG%	Field goal percentage	3P%	3-point field goal percentage	FT%	Free throw percentage
RPG	Rebounds per game	APG	Assists per game	SPG	Steals per game
BPG	Blocks per game	PPG	Points per game	**Bold**	Career high

=== NBA ===
==== Regular season ====
Year	Team	GP	GS	MPG	FG%	3P%	FT%	RPG	APG	SPG	BPG	PPG
2012–13	L.A. Lakers	32	3	6.3	.375	.000	.636	1.1	.2	.0	.3	1.3
2013–14	L.A. Lakers	65	13	16.8	**.477**	.000	**.681**	**3.9**	.8	.4	**.7**	**5.4**
2014–15	L.A. Lakers	**67**	**18**	**16.9**	.412	.000	.671	3.5	.8	.4	.6	4.6
2015–16	L.A. Lakers	25	1	12.8	.413	.000	.658	2.9	.6	.2	.4	3.5
Career		189	35	14.5	.436	.000	.671	3.1	.7	.3	.6	4.2

==== Playoffs ====
Year	Team	GP	GS	MPG	FG%	3P%	FT%	RPG	APG	SPG	BPG	PPG
2013	L.A. Lakers	2	0	2.0	.000	.000	.000	1.0	.0	.5	.0	.0
Career		2	0	2.0	.000	.000	.000	1.0	.0	.5	.0	.0

=== B.League ===
Year	Team	GP	GS	MPG	FG%	3P%	FT%	RPG	APG	SPG	BPG	PPG
2016–17	Shibuya	32	32	29.4	.431	.000	.787	8.8	1.3	.9	.7	15.0
2017–18	Shibuya	60	58	26.4	.482	.308	.750	7.5	1.4	.7	.7	16.5
2018–19	Shibuya	60	60	33.9	.518	.250	.781	9.2	1.5	.8	.9	19.4

=== College ===
Year	Team	GP	GS	MPG	FG%	3P%	FT%	RPG	APG	SPG	BPG	PPG
2007–08	Gonzaga	28	10	9.6	.444		.634	1.9	.3	.3	.2	2.9
2008–09	Gonzaga	5	0	8.8	**.714**		.625	2.8	.0	.2	.4	3.0
2009–10	Gonzaga	34	33	25.2	.526	**1.000**	.629	5.4	.6	.7	**1.9**	10.3
2010–11	Gonzaga	**35**	**35**	25.9	.488	.000	**.823**	**6.3**	**1.1**	**.8**	1.9	**12.5**
2011–12	Gonzaga	33	33	**26.3**	.511	.000	.761	6.3	.7	.4	1.4	11.6
Career		135	111	21.8	.503	.250	.734	5.0	.7	.5	1.4	9.4

== See also ==
- List of Canadians in the National Basketball Association
