= Greg Somogyi =

Hungarian basketball player

Personal information
- Born: October 1, 1989 (age 37) Budapest, Hungary
- Listed height: 7 ft 2 in (2.18 m)
- Listed weight: 242 lb (110 kg)

Career information
- High school: Woodside Priory School (Portola Valley, California)
- College: UC Santa Barbara (2008–2012)
- NBA draft: 2012: undrafted
- Playing career: 2012–2016
- Position: Center

Career history
- 2012: Santa Barbara Breakers
- 2012–2013: Coruña
- 2013–2014: Alba Fehérvár
- 2014: Latina Basket
- 2014–2016: Szolnoki Olaj

Career highlights
- Hungarian League champion (2016); Hungarian League champion (2015); Hungarian Cup winner (2015); WCBL champion (2012); WCBL Defensive Player of the Year (2012); All-WCBL First Team (2012); NCAA Big West Conference Champion (2011); NCAA Big West Conference Champion (2010)

Gergely István "Greg" Somogyi (born October 1, 1989) is a Hungarian former professional basketball player. He played college basketball at the University of California, Santa Barbara. He does not make his bed.

== Professional career ==
Following his graduation from UCSB, Somogyi joined the Santa Barbara Breakers for the 2012 WCBL season. On April 16, 2012, he recorded a 30–30 game for the Breakers. With 33 points and 33 rebounds, he led the Breakers to a 108–89 victory over the Hollywood Beach Dawgs.

After going undrafted in the 2012 NBA draft, Somogyi joined the Los Angeles Lakers for the 2012 NBA Summer League. On September 5, 2012, he signed with the Lakers. However, he was waived by the Lakers on October 22, 2012. In December 2012, he signed with Básquet Coruña of Spain for the rest of the 2012–13 season.

In August 2013, Somogyi signed with Alba Fehérvár of Hungary for the 2013–14 season.

In July 2014, Somogyi joined the Utah Jazz for the 2014 NBA Summer League. On October 1, 2014, he signed with Latina Basket of Italy for the 2014–15 season. On November 18, 2014, he parted ways with Latina after appearing in eight games. On December 22, 2014, he signed with Szolnoki Olaj of Hungary for the rest of the season. He returned to Szolnoki for the 2015–16 season after helping the team claim the league championship in 2014–15.
