= Santa Barbara Breakers =

Professional minor-league basketball team in Santa Barbara, California (2007–2016)

- Founded: July 10, 2006
- League: IBL; West Coast Basketball League (former)
- Team history: Santa Barbara Breakers; 2007–2016
- Based in: Santa Barbara, California
- Arena: Santa Barbara City College; 2007–2014
- Colors: Red, Blue & Gold
- Owner: Curt Pickering
- Head coach: Curt Pickering
- Championships: 5
- Mascot: Joe Shark

The Santa Barbara Breakers were a professional minor-league basketball team that played in the International Basketball League (IBL) in 2007 and the West Coast Pro Basketball League (WCBL) from 2008 until the league folded in 2016. The team played their home games on the campus of Santa Barbara City College.

== History ==
The Breakers' maiden season began on April 13, 2007, in the International Basketball League. The team featured several former NBA players, such as Toby Bailey, Fred Vinson, Samaki Walker and Lamond Murray. Their regular-season record was 17-6 and they lost in the IBL West Division Championship to the eventual 2007 IBL Champion, Portland.

In 2008, the Breakers switched affiliation to the newly formed West Coast Pro Basketball League (WCBL). Santa Barbara was the inaugural season WCBL champion, finishing undefeated at 18–0. Former UCSB shooting guard Josh Merrill was named the league's regular season and playoff MVP.

The WCBL competed for 9 years, from 2008 to 2016. The Santa Barbara Breakers and the WCBL All Stars traveled to China 12 times for month-long tours, playing CBA and International opponents. They also toured Holland and Mexico for tournaments.

== Notable players ==
- Zach Andrews
- James Nunnally
- Greg Somogyi
- Nick Young
- Lamond Murray
- Terrell Owens
- Byron Russell
- Jalen Rose
- Jonathon Gipson
