= Fairgrounds Grandstand Arena =

Multi-purpose arena in the United States

Coordinates: 33.668°N 117.899°W

The Fairgrounds Grandstand Arena is a 7,000-seat multi-purpose arena at the OC Fair & Event Center in Costa Mesa, California.

It was home to the Orange County Buzz basketball team of the American Basketball Association. It is also a concert venue, including several residencies of Weird Al Yankovic.
