= Newport Beach Surf =

Defunct minor league basketball team based in Pasadena, California

- Founded: 2008
- League: West Coast Pro Basketball League
- Team history: Newport Beach Surf; 2008–2013
- Based in: Anaheim, California
- Arena: American Sports Center, 1500 Anaheim Blvd, Anaheim, California
- Colors: Blue, Red and White
- Head coach: Kirk Turner

The Newport Beach Surf were a minor league basketball team that played in the former West Coast Pro Basketball League. They were based in the American Sports Center located in Anaheim, California.

== Final roster ==
- (United States) Kirk Turner Head Coach
- (United States) Doug Cherry Assistant Coach
- (United States) Rick Darnell Assistant Coach
- (United States) Norm Nixon Team Consultant
- (United States) Marcel Jackson
- (United States) James Renyolds
- (United States) Jushay Rockett
- (United States) Tez Banks
- (United States) Mike Martin
- (United States) Terrell Hendricks
- (United States) Vince Camper
- (United States) Jean Regis
- (United States) Kyle Brucculeri
- (United States) Jason Harris
