= West Coast Pro Basketball League =

West Coast Professional Basketball League (WCBL)
- Logo WCBL
- Sport: Basketball
- Founded: 2007
- Folded: 2013
- CEO: Jim Parks
- No. of teams: 8
- Country: USA
- Continent: FIBA Americas (Americas)
- Last champion: Santa Barbara Breakers (2009)
- Website: http://www.westcoastprobasketball.com

The West Coast Professional Basketball League, often abbreviated to the WCBL, was an American professional men's spring basketball minor league featuring teams from the West Coast of the United States. It operated from 2007 to 2013.

== Teams ==
=== Final operational clubs ===
- Long Beach Rockets
- Hollywood Beach Dawgs
- Santa Monica Jump
- West LA Advantage
- Nationwide All-Stars
- Central Coast Surf
- Santa Barbara Breakers
- High Desert Spartans

=== Other teams ===
- Carlsbad Beach Dawgs (2008)
- High Desert Rattlers (2008)
- Hollywood Shooting Stars/Hollywood Jammers (2008–2009)
- Orange County Gladiators (2008–2009)
- Pasadena Slam (2008–2009)
- Newport Beach Surf (2008–2013)
- Ventura County Jets (2008–2013)
- Beijing Aoshen Olympians (2009–2010)
- Long Beach Lights Out (2010)
- Los Angeles Buzz (2010)
- Marina Del Rey Advantage (2010–2013)
- Hollywood Aztecs (2011–2013)
- Los Angeles Loop (2011–2013)
- Venice Beach Ninjas (2011–2013)
