= 2012–13 Utah Jazz season =

NBA professional basketball team season

- Head coach: Tyrone Corbin
- General manager: Dennis Lindsey
- Owner: Gail Miller
- Arena: EnergySolutions Arena

Results
- Record: 43–39 (.524)
- Place: Division: 3rd (Northwest); Conference: 9th (Western)
- Playoff finish: Did not qualify
- Stats at Basketball Reference

Local media
- Television: Root Sports Utah
- Radio: KFNZ; KBEE

The 2012–13 Utah Jazz season was the franchise's 39th season in the National Basketball Association (NBA), and the 34th season of the franchise in Salt Lake City. Despite a 43–39 record, the Jazz missed the playoffs. Had the Jazz been in the weaker eastern conference, they would have been the 7th seed over the 41-40 Boston Celtics and the 38-44 Milwaukee Bucks.

== Key dates ==
- June 28:The NBA draft took place at the Prudential Center in Newark, New Jersey.

== Draft picks ==
Round	Pick	Player	Position	Nationality	College
2	47	Kevin Murphy	SG	United States	Tennessee Tech

== Roster ==
2012–13 Utah Jazz roster
Players

Pos.	No.	Player	Height	Weight	DOB	From
SG	10	Alec Burks	6 ft 6 in (1.98 m)	202 lb (92 kg)	1991-07-20	Colorado
SF	3	DeMarre Carroll	6 ft 8 in (2.03 m)	212 lb (96 kg)	1986-07-27	Missouri
PF	40	Jeremy Evans	6 ft 9 in (2.06 m)	194 lb (88 kg)	1987-10-24	Western Kentucky
PF	15	Derrick Favors	6 ft 10 in (2.08 m)	248 lb (112 kg)	1991-07-15	Georgia Tech
SG	8	Randy Foye	6 ft 4 in (1.93 m)	213 lb (97 kg)	1983-09-24	Villanova
SF	20	Gordon Hayward	6 ft 8 in (2.03 m)	210 lb (95 kg)	1990-03-23	Butler
C	25	Al Jefferson	6 ft 10 in (2.08 m)	289 lb (131 kg)	1985-01-04	Prentiss HS (MS)
C	0	Enes Kanter	6 ft 11 in (2.11 m)	267 lb (121 kg)	1992-05-20	Turkey
PF	24	Paul Millsap	6 ft 8 in (2.03 m)	253 lb (115 kg)	1985-02-10	Louisiana Tech
SG	55	Kevin Murphy	6 ft 6 in (1.98 m)	185 lb (84 kg)	1990-03-06	Tennessee Tech
PG	6	Jamaal Tinsley	6 ft 3 in (1.91 m)	197 lb (89 kg)	1978-02-28	Iowa State
PG	11	Earl Watson	6 ft 1 in (1.85 m)	199 lb (90 kg)	1979-06-12	UCLA
SF	2	Marvin Williams	6 ft 9 in (2.06 m)	237 lb (108 kg)	1986-06-19	North Carolina
PG	5	Mo Williams	6 ft 1 in (1.85 m)	198 lb (90 kg)	1982-12-19	Alabama

Coaches
Head coach
- Tyrone Corbin
Assistant(s)
- Jeff Hornacek
- Sidney Lowe
- Mark McKown
- Mike Sanders

Legend
- (DP) Unsigned draft pick
- (FA) Free agent
- (S) Suspended
- Injured

Roster
Updated: March 27, 2013

== Preseason ==
2012 pre-season game log
Pre-season: 5–3 (home: 3–0; road: 2–3)

Game	Date	Team	Score	High points	High rebounds	High assists	Location Attendance	Record
1	October 8	@ Golden State	L 80–83	Marvin Williams, Paul Millsap (13)	Enes Kanter (11)	Mo Williams, Jamaal Tinsley (6)	Oracle Arena; 14,571	0–1
2	October 12	Oklahoma City	W 97–81	Mo Williams (15)	Enes Kanter (12)	Al Jefferson (3)	Energy Solutions Arena; 17,786	1–1
3	October 13	@ L.A Lakers	W 99–86	Marvin Williams, Enes Kanter (14)	Enes Kanter (14)	Mo Williams (7)	Staples Center; 18,372	2–1
4	October 16	@ L.A Lakers	W 114–80	Gordon Hayward (14)	Al Jefferson, Paul Millsap (7)	Derrick Favors, DeMarre Carroll (4)	Honda Center; 13,896	3–1
5	October 17	@ L.A. Clippers	L 94–96	Randy Foye (17)	Enes Kanter (9)	Jamaal Tinsley (7)	Staples Center; 14,617	3–2
6	October 20	L.A. Clippers	W 99–91	Marvin Williams (18)	Paul Millsap (9)	Mo Williams (8)	Energy Solutions Arena; 18,741	4–2
7	October 22	@ Portland	L 114–120	Enes Kanter (18)	three players (6)	Mo Williams (7)	Rose Garden; 19,150	4–3
8	October 25	Portland	W 97–91	Enes Kanter; Derrick Favors (21)	Enes Kanter (12)	Jamaal Tinsley (6)	EnergySolutions Arena; 18,247	5–3

2012–13 season schedule

== Regular season ==
=== Standings ===
Northwest Division	W	L	PCT	GB	Home	Road	Div	GP
c-Oklahoma City Thunder	60	22	.732	–	34–7	26–15	10–6	82
x-Denver Nuggets	57	25	.695	3	38–3	19–22	11–5	82
Utah Jazz	43	39	.524	17	30–11	13–28	9–7	82
Portland Trail Blazers	33	49	.402	27	22–19	11–30	6–10	82
Minnesota Timberwolves	31	51	.378	29	20–21	11–30	4–12	82

Western Conference
#	Team	W	L	PCT	GB	GP
1	c-Oklahoma City Thunder *	60	22	.732	–	82
2	y-San Antonio Spurs *	58	24	.707	2.0	82
3	x-Denver Nuggets *	57	25	.695	3.0	82
4	y-Los Angeles Clippers	56	26	.683	4.0	82
5	x-Memphis Grizzlies	56	26	.683	4.0	82
6	x-Golden State Warriors	47	35	.573	13.0	82
7	x-Los Angeles Lakers	45	37	.549	15.0	82
8	x-Houston Rockets	45	37	.549	15.0	82
9	Utah Jazz	43	39	.524	17.0	82
10	Dallas Mavericks	41	41	.500	19.0	82
11	Portland Trail Blazers	33	49	.402	27.0	82
12	Minnesota Timberwolves	31	51	.378	29.0	82
13	Sacramento Kings	28	54	.341	32.0	82
14	New Orleans Hornets	27	55	.329	33.0	82
15	Phoenix Suns	25	57	.305	35.0	82

=== Game log ===
2012–13 game log
Total: 43–39 (Home: 30–11; Road: 13–28)
October: 1–0 (home: 1–0; road: 0–0)

Game	Date	Team	Score	High points	High rebounds	High assists	Location Attendance	Record
1	October 31	Dallas	W 113–94	Marvin Williams, Mo Williams (21)	Paul Millsap (15)	Mo Williams (6)	Energy Solutions Arena; 17,634	1–0

November : 8–8 (home: 5–0; road: 3–8)

Game	Date	Team	Score	High points	High rebounds	High assists	Location Attendance	Record
2	November 2	@ New Orleans	L 86–88	Randy Foye (20)	Derrick Favors (9)	Jamaal Tinsley (6)	New Orleans Arena; 14,147	1–1
3	November 3	@ San Antonio	L 100–110	Mo Williams (29)	Paul Millsap (10)	Mo Williams (9)	AT&T Center; 18,581	1–2
4	November 5	@ Memphis	L 94–103	Gordon Hayward (19)	Al Jefferson (10)	Mo Williams (8)	FedExForum; 17,401	1–3
5	November 7	L. A. Lakers	W 95–86	Al Jefferson (18)	Al Jefferson (10)	Mo Williams (7)	Energy Solutions Arena; 19,911	2–3
6	November 9	@ Denver	L 84–104	Gordon Hayward (15)	Favors & Jefferson (11)	Jamaal Tinsley (7)	Pepsi Center; 15,523	2–4
7	November 10	Phoenix	W 94–81	Al Jefferson (27)	Al Jefferson (14)	Jamaal Tinsley (14)	Energy Solutions Arena; 19,100	3–4
8	November 12	@ Toronto	W 140–133 (3OT)	Paul Millsap (34)	Al Jefferson (17)	Mo Williams (14)	Air Canada Centre; 18,230	4-4
9	November 14	@ Boston	L 93–98	Paul Millsap (20)	Al Jefferson (14)	Mo Williams (5)	TD Garden; 18,624	4–5
10	November 16	@ Philadelphia	L 93–99	Paul Millsap (22)	Al Jefferson (9)	Jamaal Tinsley (6)	Wells Fargo Center; 15,851	4–6
11	November 17	@ Washington	W 83–76	Al Jefferson (21)	Al Jefferson (13)	Mo Williams (6)	Verizon Center; 16,210	5–6
12	November 19	Houston	W 102–91	Gordon Hayward (15)	Al Jefferson (16)	Jamaal Tinsley (11)	Energy Solutions Arena; 19,197	6-6
13	November 23	Sacramento	W 104–102	Gordon Hayward (23)	Derrick Favors (14)	Jamaal Tinsley (12)	Energy Solutions Arena; 18,000	7–6
14	November 24	@ Sacramento	L 97–108	Randy Foye (17)	Paul Millsap (8)	Jamaal Tinsley (7)	Sleep Train Arena; 12,239	7-7
15	November 26	Denver	W 105–103	Al Jefferson (28)	Derrick Favors (7)	Jamaal Tinsley (6)	Energy Solutions Arena; 18,776	8–7
16	November 28	@ New Orleans	W 96–84	Al Jefferson (19)	Favors & Millsap (8)	Jamaal Tinsley (5)	New Orleans Arena; 10,693	9–7
17	November 30	@ Oklahoma City	L 94–106	Enes Kanter (18)	Al Jefferson (11)	Earl Watson (8)	Chesapeake Energy Arena; 18,203	9–8

December : 6–9 (home: 3–4; road: 3–5)

Game	Date	Team	Score	High points	High rebounds	High assists	Location Attendance	Record
18	December 1	@ Houston	L 116–124	Gordon Hayward (21)	Paul Millsap (11)	Mo Williams (7)	Toyota Center; 14,432	9-9
19	December 3	L. A. Clippers	L 104–105	Mo Williams (20)	Al Jefferson (10)	Mo Williams (12)	EnergySolutions Arena; 19,067	9–10
20	December 5	Orlando	W 87–81	Al Jefferson (31)	Al Jefferson (15)	Mo Williams (7)	EnergySolutions Arena; 18,078	10-10
21	December 7	Toronto	W 131–99	Paul Millsap (20)	Paul Millsap (10)	Mo Williams (10)	EnergySolutions Arena; 18,069	11–10
22	December 9	@ L. A. Lakers	W 117–110	Paul Millsap (24)	Al Jefferson (11)	Mo Williams (9)	Staples Center; 18,997	12–10
23	December 12	San Antonio	W 99–96	Paul Millsap (24)	Paul Millsap (12)	Gordon Hayward (6)	EnergySolutions Arena; 18,710	13–10
24	December 14	@ Phoenix	L 84–99	Al Jefferson (14)	Al Jefferson (11)	Mo Williams (7)	US Airways Center; 14,182	13–11
25	December 15	Memphis	L 86–99	Al Jefferson (21)	Al Jefferson (8)	Mo Williams (7)	EnergySolutions Arena; 18,183	13–12
26	December 18	@ Brooklyn	W 92–90	Mo Williams (19)	Al Jefferson (11)	Mo Williams (6)	Barclays Center; 15,835	14–12
27	December 19	@ Indiana	L 84–104	Derrick Favors (16)	Favors, Kanter & Millsap (9)	Earl Watson (4)	Bankers Life Fieldhouse; 13,559	14–13
28	December 22	@ Miami	L 89–105	Marvin Williams (16)	Al Jefferson (11)	Watson & Mo Williams (4)	American Airlines Arena; 20,087	14-14
29	December 23	@ Orlando	W 97–93	Paul Millsap (18)	Al Jefferson (9)	Earl Watson (8)	Amway Center; 17,721	15–14
30	December 26	Golden State	L 83–94	Al Jefferson (18)	Al Jefferson (10)	Jamaal Tinsley (4)	EnergySolutions Arena; 19,404	15-15
31	December 28	L. A. Clippers	L 114–116	Randy Foye (28)	Al Jefferson (8)	Jamaal Tinsley (5)	EnergySolutions Arena; 19,911	15–16
32	December 30	@ L. A. Clippers	L 96–107	Al Jefferson (30)	Carroll & Jefferson (8)	Jamaal Tinsley (11)	Staples Center; 19,111	15–17

January : 10–4 (home: 7–1; road: 3–3)

Game	Date	Team	Score	High points	High rebounds	High assists	Location Attendance	Record
33	January 2	Minnesota	W 106–84	Gordon Hayward (17)	Enes Kanter (8)	Earl Watson (9)	EnergySolutions Arena; 19,120	16–17
34	January 4	@ Phoenix	W 87–80	Al Jefferson (21)	Paul Millsap (10)	Earl Watson (8)	US Airways Center; 14,874	17-17
35	January 5	@ Denver	L 91–110	Paul Millsap (15)	Al Jefferson (8)	Jamaal Tinsley (5)	Pepsi Center; 19,155	17–18
36	January 7	Dallas	W 100–94	Gordon Hayward (27)	Al Jefferson (11)	Jamaal Tinsley (6)	EnergySolutions Arena; 18,600	18-18
37	January 9	@ Charlotte	W 112–102	Al Jefferson (26)	Al Jefferson (8)	Jamaal Tinsley (8)	Time Warner Cable Arena; 13,347	19–18
38	January 11	@ Atlanta	L 95–103	Randy Foye (25)	Paul Millsap (13)	Jamaal Tinsley (9)	Philips Arena; 12,064	19-19
39	January 12	@ Detroit	W 90–87	Al Jefferson (20)	Al Jefferson (10)	Earl Watson (6)	The Palace of Auburn Hills; 18,441	20–19
40	January 14	Miami	W 104–97	Al Jefferson (23)	Al Jefferson (11)	Jamaal Tinsley (7)	EnergySolutions Arena; 19,911	21–19
41	January 19	Cleveland	W 109–98	Randy Foye (20)	Al Jefferson (11)	Earl Watson (9)	EnergySolutions Arena; 19,911	22–19
42	January 23	Washington	W 92–88	Paul Millsap (16)	Paul Millsap (15)	Jamaal Tinsley (6)	EnergySolutions Arena; 18,158	23–19
43	January 25	@ L. A. Lakers	L 84–102	Derrick Favors (14)	Al Jefferson (7)	Jamaal Tinsley (6)	Staples Center; 18,997	23–20
44	January 26	Indiana	W 114–110 (OT)	Al Jefferson (25)	Al Jefferson (6)	Jamaal Tinsley (9)	EnergySolutions Arena; 19,201	24–20
45	January 28	Houston	L 80–125	Randy Foye (20)	Al Jefferson (6)	Alec Burks (4)	EnergySolutions Arena; 18,387	24–21
46	January 30	New Orleans	W 104–99	Paul Millsap (25)	Paul Millsap (10)	Randy Foye (8)	EnergySolutions Arena; 17,490	25–21

February : 6–6 (home: 5–3; road: 1–3)

Game	Date	Team	Score	High points	High rebounds	High assists	Location Attendance	Record
47	February 1	Portland	W 86–77	Al Jefferson (21)	Derrick Favors (12)	Earl Watson (7)	EnergySolutions Arena; 19,512	26–21
48	February 2	@ Portland	L 99–105	Randy Foye (23)	Paul Millsap (8)	Jamaal Tinsley (6)	Rose Garden; 20,376	26–22
49	February 4	Sacramento	W 98–91 (OT)	Randy Foye (20)	Al Jefferson (12)	Randy Foye (6)	EnergySolutions Arena; 17,742	27–22
50	February 6	Milwaukee	W 100–86	Jefferson & Millsap (19)	Favors & Jefferson (11)	Millsap & Tinsley (5)	EnergySolutions Arena; 18,571	28–22
51	February 8	Chicago	L 89–93	Al Jefferson (32)	Al Jefferson (13)	Foye & Tinsley (6)	EnergySolutions Arena; 19,911	28–23
52	February 9	@ Sacramento	L 109–120	Alec Burks (24)	Favors & Millsap (8)	Tinsley & Watson (5)	Sleep Train Arena; 16,193	28–24
53	February 12	Oklahoma City	W 109–94	Al Jefferson (23)	Paul Millsap (10)	Tinsley & Millsap (6)	EnergySolutions Arena; 18,552	29–24
54	February 13	@ Minnesota	W 97–93	Paul Millsap (21)	Al Jefferson (11)	Alec Burks (7)	Target Center; 13,117	30–24
All-Star Break
55	February 19	Golden State	W 115–101	Al Jefferson (24)	Paul Millsap (9)	Tinsley & Watson (5)	EnergySolutions Arena; 18,231	31–24
56	February 23	@ L. A. Clippers	L 94–107	Gordon Hayward (23)	Derrick Favors (8)	Earl Watson (8)	Staples Center; 19,165	31–25
57	February 25	Boston	L 107–110 (OT)	Gordon Hayward (26)	Al Jefferson (11)	Paul Millsap (5)	EnergySolutions Arena; 19,911	31-26
58	February 27	Atlanta	L 91–102	Al Jefferson (26)	Derrick Favors (15)	Earl Watson (5)	EnergySolutions Arena; 19,267	31–27

March : 7–9 (home: 6–1; road: 1–8)

Game	Date	Team	Score	High points	High rebounds	High assists	Location Attendance	Record
59	March 1	Charlotte	W 98–68	Enes Kanter (23)	Enes Kanter (22)	Jamaal Tinsley (5)	EnergySolutions Arena; 17,691	32–27
60	March 4	@ Milwaukee	L 108–109 (OT)	Derrick Favors (23)	Derrick Favors (15)	Gordon Hayward (5)	BMO Harris Bradley Center; 13,926	32–28
61	March 6	@ Cleveland	L 101–104	Gordon Hayward (25)	Derrick Favors (12)	Gordon Hayward (7)	Quicken Loans Arena; 12,124	32–29
62	March 8	@ Chicago	L 88–89	Al Jefferson (23)	Derrick Favors (10)	Jamaal Tinsley (5)	United Center; 21,842	32–30
63	March 9	@ New York	L 84–113	Alec Burks (14)	Marvin Williams (7)	Marvin Williams (4)	Madison Square Garden; 19,033	32–31
64	March 11	Detroit	W 103–90	Marvin Williams (20)	Al Jefferson (10)	Marvin Williams (6)	EnergySolutions Arena; 18,568	33–31
65	March 13	@ Oklahoma City	L 87–110	Gordon Hayward (20)	Paul Millsap (7)	Earl Watson (6)	Chesapeake Energy Arena; 18,203	33–32
66	March 16	Memphis	W 90–84	Gordon Hayward (17)	Gordon Hayward (8)	Marvin Williams (6)	EnergySolutions Arena; 17,122	34–32
67	March 18	New York	L 83–90	Gordon Hayward (17)	Derrick Favors (13)	Marvin Williams (5)	EnergySolutions Arena; 18,494	34–33
68	March 20	@ Houston	L 93–100	Gordon Hayward (27)	Al Jefferson (11)	Marvin Williams (6)	Toyota Center; 15,739	34-34
69	March 22	@ San Antonio	L 97–104 (OT)	Mo Williams (23)	Al Jefferson (13)	Mo Williams (8)	AT&T Center; 18,581	34–35
70	March 24	@ Dallas	L 108–113	Enes Kanter (17)	Paul Millsap (9)	Mo Williams (8)	American Airlines Center; 19,821	34–36
71	March 25	Philadelphia	W 107–91	Randy Foye (20)	Derrick Favors (13)	Mo Williams (8)	EnergySolutions Arena; 17,336	35–36
72	March 27	Phoenix	W 103–88	Gordon Hayward (25)	Derrick Favors (13)	Mo Williams (10)	EnergySolutions Arena; 16,949	36-36
73	March 29	@ Portland	W 105–95	Mo Williams (28)	Paul Millsap (10)	Gordon Hayward (8)	Rose Garden; 19,527	37–36
74	March 30	Brooklyn	W 116–107	Randy Foye (26)	Derrick Favors (9)	Paul Millsap (9)	EnergySolutions Arena; 18,008	38–36

April : 5–3 (home: 3–2; road: 2–1)

Game	Date	Team	Score	High points	High rebounds	High assists	Location Attendance	Record
75	April 1	Portland	W 112–102	Al Jefferson (24)	Al Jefferson (10)	Mo Williams (9)	EnergySolutions Arena; 18,336	39–36
76	April 3	Denver	L 96–113	Gordon Hayward (18)	Al Jefferson (9)	Mo Williams (7)	EnergySolutions Arena; 17,654	39–37
77	April 5	New Orleans	W 95–83	Gordon Hayward (23)	Mo Williams & Favors (10)	Millsap & Tinsley (7)	EnergySolutions Arena; 18,023	40–37
78	April 7	@ Golden State	W 97–90	Mo Williams (25)	Derrick Favors (13)	Gordon Hayward (6)	Oracle Arena; 19,596	41–37
79	April 9	Oklahoma City	L 80–90	Mo Williams (19)	Al Jefferson (11)	Mo Williams (6)	EnergySolutions Arena; 19,610	41–38
80	April 12	Minnesota	W 107–100	Al Jefferson (40)	Al Jefferson (13)	Al Jefferson (6)	EnergySolutions Arena; 19,609	42–38
81	April 15	@ Minnesota	W 96–80	Al Jefferson (22)	Millsap & Jefferson (8)	Mo Williams (7)	Target Center; 17,009	43–38
82	April 17	@ Memphis	L 70–86	Al Jefferson (22)	Al Jefferson (16)	Mo Williams & Favors (3)	FedExForum; 16,777	43–39

2012–13 season schedule

== Player statistics ==
Legend
GP	Games played	GS	Games started	MPG	Minutes per game
FG%	Field-goal percentage	3P%	3-point field-goal percentage	FT%	Free-throw percentage
RPG	Rebounds per game	APG	Assists per game	SPG	Steals per game
BPG	Blocks per game	PPG	Points per game

=== Regular season ===
Player	GP	GS	MPG	FG%	3P%	FT%	RPG	APG	SPG	BPG	PPG
Randy Foye	82	72	27.4	.397	.410	.819	1.5	2.0	.8	.3	10.8
Al Jefferson	78	78	33.1	.494	.118	.770	9.2	2.1	1.0	1.1	17.8
Paul Millsap	78	78	30.4	.490	.333	.742	7.1	2.6	1.3	1.0	14.6
Derrick Favors	77	8	23.2	.482	.000	.688	7.1	1.0	.9	1.7	9.4
Marvin Williams	73	51	23.7	.423	.325	.778	3.6	1.1	.5	.5	7.2
Gordon Hayward	72	27	29.2	.435	.415	.827	3.1	3.0	.8	.5	14.1
Enes Kanter Freedom	70	2	15.4	.544	1.000	.795	4.3	.4	.4	.5	7.2
Jamaal Tinsley	66	32	18.5	.368	.307	.692	1.7	4.4	1.0	.2	3.5
DeMarre Carroll	66	12	16.8	.460	.286	.765	2.8	.9	.9	.4	6.0
Alec Burks	64	0	17.8	.420	.359	.713	2.3	1.4	.5	.2	7.0
Earl Watson	48	4	17.3	.308	.179	.680	1.8	4.0	.8	.2	2.0
Mo Williams	46	46	30.8	.430	.383	.882	2.4	6.2	1.0	.2	12.9
Jeremy Evans	37	0	5.8	.614	.000	.636	1.6	.3	.2	.4	2.0
Kevin Murphy	17	0	3.1	.250	.200		.2	.1	.1	.0	.9

== Transactions ==
=== Overview ===
Players Added

Via draft

- Kevin Murphy

Via trade

- Marvin Williams
- Mo Williams

Via free agency

- Randy Foye
Players Lost

Via trade

- Devin Harris

Via free agency

- Blake Ahearn
- C. J. Miles

=== Trades ===
June 29, 2012 (4-team trade)	To Utah Jazz Mo Williams (from L. A. Clippers); Draft rights to Shan Foster (from Dallas)	To Dallas Mavericks Draft rights to Tadija Dragićević
July 11, 2012	To Utah Jazz Marvin Williams	To Atlanta Hawks Devin Harris

=== Free agents ===
Additions
Player	Date signed	Former team
Jeremy Evans	July 11	Utah Jazz (re-signed)
Randy Foye	July 25	Los Angeles Clippers

Subtractions
Player	Date left	New team
C. J. Miles	August 8	Cleveland Cavaliers
Blake Ahearn	September 6	Indiana Pacers
