= 2012–13 Oklahoma City Thunder season =

NBA professional basketball team season

- Division champions
- Head coach: Scott Brooks
- General manager: Sam Presti
- Owners: Professional Basketball Club LLC
- Arena: Chesapeake Energy Arena

Results
- Record: 60–22 (.732)
- Place: Division: 1st (Northwest); Conference: 1st (Western)
- Playoff finish: Conference Semifinals (lost to Grizzlies 1–4)
- Stats at Basketball Reference

Local media
- Television: Fox Sports Oklahoma
- Radio: KWPN; WWLS-FM

The 2012–13 Oklahoma City Thunder season was the 5th season of the franchise in Oklahoma City and the 47th in the National Basketball Association (NBA). After their trip to the NBA Finals, despite losing the Finals to the Miami Heat in five games, the Thunder improved on last season's output, winning 60 games, earning them the top seed in the Western Conference and second overall. The first round pitted the Thunder against the eight-seeded Houston Rockets, led by James Harden, a former Thunder player. Despite a season-ending injury to Russell Westbrook in Game 2, the Thunder still managed to breeze past the Rockets in six games, to advance to the next round, where they faced the Memphis Grizzlies. The absence of Westbrook, however, affected the Thunder and they would end up losing to the Grizzlies in five games.

== Previous season ==
The Thunder finished the 2011–12 season 47–19 in the lockout shortened season to finish in first place in the Northwest Division, second in the Western Conference and qualified for the playoffs. The Thunder made it to the 2012 NBA Finals but were defeated 4–1 against the Miami Heat. Last season featured Kevin Durant's third consecutive scoring title, Durant being named the MVP of the 2012 NBA All-Star Game, All-Star appearances for Durant and Russell Westbrook, James Harden being awarded the NBA Sixth Man of the Year Award and an All-Defensive First-Team selection for Serge Ibaka.

== Offseason ==
=== Draft picks ===
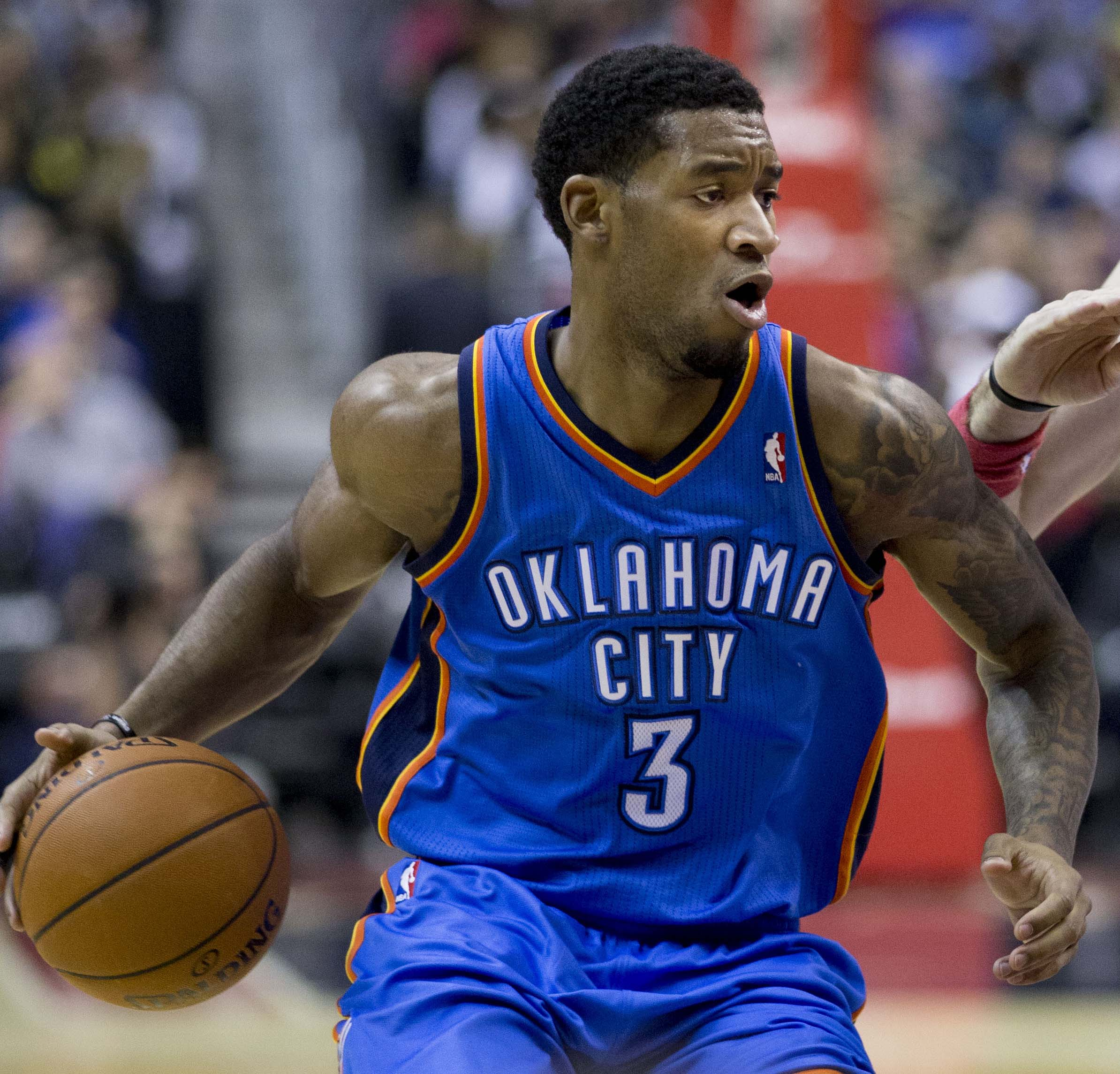
Perry Jones was selected 28th overall by the Oklahoma City Thunder.

Round	Pick	Player	Position	Nationality	College
1	28	Perry Jones	SF	United States	Baylor

The Thunder had only their own first-round pick entering the draft. The Thunder traded their 2012 second-round pick in the Robert Vaden trade to the Minnesota Timberwolves back in 2011. The Thunder ended 2012 NBA draft night with Baylor forward Perry Jones.

=== Trades ===
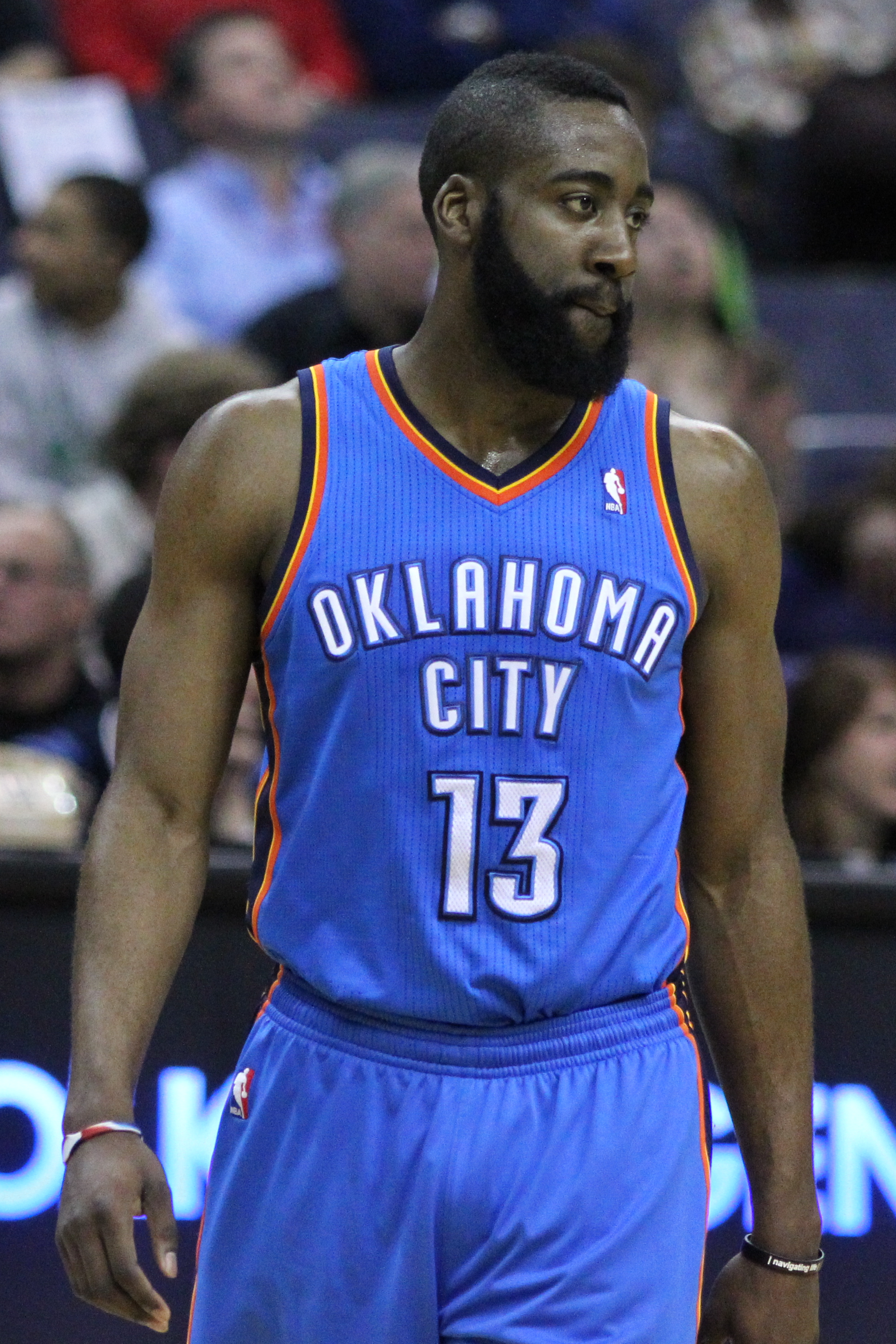
James Harden was traded to the Houston Rockets after three seasons with the Thunder.

On October 27, the Thunder traded reigning sixth man of the year James Harden, Cole Aldrich, Daequan Cook and Lazar Hayward to the Houston Rockets in exchange for Kevin Martin, Jeremy Lamb, a 2013 first-round pick, a 2013 second-round pick and a 2014 first-round pick. Harden was set to hit restricted free agency following the 2012-13 season and was unable to work out an extension. The Thunder offered a four-year, $55 million extension which was $4.5 million less than the max contract that Harden coveted. Due to the NBA's luxury tax, the Thunder were unwilling to offer a max extension to Harden in order to avoid paying hefty taxes.

We wanted to sign James to an extension, but at the end of the day, these situations have to work for all those involved. Our ownership group again showed their commitment to the organization with several significant offers. We were unable to reach a mutual agreement, and therefore executed a trade that capitalized on the opportunity to bring in a player of Kevin's caliber, a young talent like Jeremy and draft picks, which will be important to our organizational goal of a sustainable team. We appreciate James, Cole, Daequan and Lazar’s contributions to the Thunder organization and this community and wish them the best in the future.

— Sam Presti

Two years later, Harden reiterated the point that he would still be with the Thunder had money not been an issue.

I felt like I already made a sacrifice coming off the bench and doing whatever it takes to help the team, and they weren’t willing to help me,

— James Harden

In exchange for Harden, the Thunder received Kevin Martin and Jeremy Lamb. Martin came off the 2011-12 season as the leading scorer for the Rockets, averaging 17.1 points. Martin, who since been a starter since 2006, became the Thunder's new sixth man. Lamb, a rookie out of UConn was also sent to the Thunder. Lamb was originally selected 12th overall in the 2012 NBA draft coming off two seasons with the Huskies with career averages of 14.1 points.

=== Free agency ===
For this offseason, free agency began on July 1, 2012, while the July moratorium ended on July 11. Derek Fisher, Royal Ivey and Nazr Mohammed were set to hit unrestricted free agency. On July 27, Royal Ivey and Nazr Mohammed signed with the Philadelphia 76ers and the Chicago Bulls respectively. On November 28, Derek Fisher signed a one-year deal with the Dallas Mavericks.

On July 11, Hasheem Thabeet signed a contract with the Thunder. Thabeet was originally selected 2nd overall in the 2009 NBA draft that saw James Harden go 3rd overall. Thabeet spent the 2011-12 season with the Houston Rockets and Portland Trail Blazers. On September 12, DeAndre Liggins signed a contract with the Thunder. Liggins was originally selected 53rd overall in the 2011 NBA draft spending only one season with the Orlando Magic last year. On October 31, Daniel Orton signed a contract with the Thunder. Orton, who also spent last season with the Orlando Magic, was originally selected 29th overall in the 2010 NBA draft.

On August 18, Serge Ibaka agreed to a four-year, $48 million contract extension to stay with the Thunder.

=== Front office and coaching changes ===
On October 12, the Thunder announced Mike Wilks as a pro scout. Wilks joins the Thunder after playing seven seasons in the league, including a stint with the Thunder during the 2008-09 season.

== Roster ==
2012–13 Oklahoma City Thunder roster
Players

Pos.	No.	Player	Height	Weight	DOB	From
SF	8	Ronnie Brewer	6 ft 7 in (2.01 m)	225 lb (102 kg)	1985-03-20	Arkansas
C	4	Nick Collison	6 ft 10 in (2.08 m)	255 lb (116 kg)	1980-10-26	Kansas
SF	35	Kevin Durant	6 ft 9 in (2.06 m)	230 lb (104 kg)	1988-09-29	Texas
SG	6	Derek Fisher	6 ft 1 in (1.85 m)	210 lb (95 kg)	1974-08-09	Little Rock
PF	9	Serge Ibaka	6 ft 10 in (2.08 m)	235 lb (107 kg)	1989-09-18	Spain
PG	15	Reggie Jackson	6 ft 3 in (1.91 m)	208 lb (94 kg)	1990-04-16	Boston College
SF	3	Perry Jones III	6 ft 11 in (2.11 m)	235 lb (107 kg)	1991-09-24	Baylor
SF	11	Jeremy Lamb	6 ft 5 in (1.96 m)	180 lb (82 kg)	1992-05-30	Connecticut
SG	25	DeAndre Liggins	6 ft 6 in (1.98 m)	209 lb (95 kg)	1988-03-31	Kentucky
SG	23	Kevin Martin	6 ft 7 in (2.01 m)	185 lb (84 kg)	1983-02-01	Western Carolina
C	33	Daniel Orton	6 ft 10 in (2.08 m)	255 lb (116 kg)	1990-08-06	Kentucky
C	5	Kendrick Perkins	6 ft 10 in (2.08 m)	267 lb (121 kg)	1984-11-10	Clifton J. Ozen HS (TX)
SG	2	Thabo Sefolosha	6 ft 7 in (2.01 m)	215 lb (98 kg)	1984-05-02	Switzerland
C	34	Hasheem Thabeet	7 ft 3 in (2.21 m)	263 lb (119 kg)	1987-02-16	Connecticut
PG	0	Russell Westbrook	6 ft 3 in (1.91 m)	187 lb (85 kg)	1988-11-12	UCLA

Coaches
Head coach
- Scott Brooks
Assistant(s)
- Mark Bryant
- Maurice Cheeks
- Rex Kalamian
- Brian Keefe

Legend
- (DP) Unsigned draft pick
- (FA) Free agent
- (S) Suspended
- (DL) On assignment to D-League affiliate
- Injured

Roster
Updated: April 20, 2013

== Standings ==
=== Conference ===
Western Conference
#	Team	W	L	PCT	GB	GP
1	c-Oklahoma City Thunder *	60	22	.732	–	82
2	y-San Antonio Spurs *	58	24	.707	2.0	82
3	x-Denver Nuggets *	57	25	.695	3.0	82
4	y-Los Angeles Clippers	56	26	.683	4.0	82
5	x-Memphis Grizzlies	56	26	.683	4.0	82
6	x-Golden State Warriors	47	35	.573	13.0	82
7	x-Los Angeles Lakers	45	37	.549	15.0	82
8	x-Houston Rockets	45	37	.549	15.0	82
9	Utah Jazz	43	39	.524	17.0	82
10	Dallas Mavericks	41	41	.500	19.0	82
11	Portland Trail Blazers	33	49	.402	27.0	82
12	Minnesota Timberwolves	31	51	.378	29.0	82
13	Sacramento Kings	28	54	.341	32.0	82
14	New Orleans Hornets	27	55	.329	33.0	82
15	Phoenix Suns	25	57	.305	35.0	82

=== Division ===
Northwest Division	W	L	PCT	GB	Home	Road	Div	GP
c-Oklahoma City Thunder	60	22	.732	–	34–7	26–15	10–6	82
x-Denver Nuggets	57	25	.695	3	38–3	19–22	11–5	82
Utah Jazz	43	39	.524	17	30–11	13–28	9–7	82
Portland Trail Blazers	33	49	.402	27	22–19	11–30	6–10	82
Minnesota Timberwolves	31	51	.378	29	20–21	11–30	4–12	82

== Game log ==
=== Preseason ===
2012 pre-season game log
Pre-season: 4–3 (home: 4–0; road: 0–3)

Game	Date	Team	Score	High points	High rebounds	High assists	Location Attendance	Record
1	October 7	@ Houston	L 105–107	Russell Westbrook (19)	Cole Aldrich (11)	Reggie Jackson (5)	Toyota Center; 5,198	0–1
2	October 12	@ Utah	L 81–97	Perry Jones III (14)	Cole Aldrich (10)	Eric Maynor (5)	EnergySolutions Arena; 17,786	0–2
3	October 16	Charlotte	W 120–98	Andy Rautins (20)	Serge Ibaka (10)	Kevin Durant, Eric Maynor (7)	Chesapeake Energy Arena; 18,203	1–2
4	October 19	Phoenix	W 107–97	Kevin Durant (22)	Serge Ibaka (8)	Russell Westbrook (12)	BOK Center; 18,233	2–2
5	October 21	Denver	W 108–101	Three players (16)	Cole Aldrich (7)	Russell Westbrook (9)	Chesapeake Energy Arena; 18,203	3–2
6	October 23	@ Chicago	L 89–94	Serge Ibaka (24)	Hasheem Thabeet (10)	James Harden (7)	United Center; 21,532	3–3
7	October 24	Dallas	W 88–76	Kevin Durant (18)	Kevin Durant, Serge Ibaka (7)	Russell Westbrook (6)	Intrust Bank Arena; 15,004	4–3

2012–13 season schedule

=== Regular season ===
2012–13 game log
Total: 60–22 (home: 34–7; road: 26–15)
November: 13–4 (home: 9–2; road: 4–2)

Game	Date	Team	Score	High points	High rebounds	High assists	Location Attendance	Record
1	November 1	@ San Antonio	L 84–86	Kevin Durant (23)	Kevin Durant (14)	Durant, Westbrook & Martin (5)	AT&T Center; 18,581	0–1
2	November 2	Portland	W 106–92	Russell Westbrook (32)	Kevin Durant (17)	Kevin Durant (7)	Chesapeake Energy Arena; 18,203	1–1
3	November 4	Atlanta	L 95–104	Kevin Martin (28)	Kevin Durant (12)	Russell Westbrook (9)	Chesapeake Energy Arena; 18,203	1–2
4	November 6	Toronto	W 108–88	Russell Westbrook (19)	Kendrick Perkins (9)	Russell Westbrook (8)	Chesapeake Energy Arena; 18,203	2–2
5	November 8	@ Chicago	W 97–91	Kevin Durant (24)	Serge Ibaka (9)	Russell Westbrook (12)	United Center; 21,737	3–2
6	November 9	Detroit	W 105–94	Durant & Ibaka (24)	Kevin Durant (13)	Westbrook & Perkins (6)	Chesapeake Energy Arena; 18,203	4–2
7	November 11	Cleveland	W 106–91	Russell Westbrook (27)	Kevin Durant (8)	Russell Westbrook (10)	Chesapeake Energy Arena; 18,203	5–2
8	November 12	@ Detroit	W 92–90	Russell Westbrook (33)	Russell Westbrook (10)	Russell Westbrook (4)	The Palace of Auburn Hills; 12,784	6–2
9	November 14	Memphis	L 97–107	Kevin Durant (34)	Kevin Durant (10)	Russell Westbrook (13)	Chesapeake Energy Arena; 18,203	6–3
10	November 16	@ New Orleans	W 110–95	Durant & Martin (27)	Durant & Thabeet (9)	Russell Westbrook (12)	New Orleans Arena; 15,458	7–3
11	November 18	Golden State	W 119–109	Russell Westbrook (30)	Kevin Durant (13)	Kevin Durant (10)	Chesapeake Energy Arena; 18,203	8–3
12	November 21	L. A. Clippers	W 117–111	Kevin Durant (35)	Serge Ibaka (12)	Russell Westbrook (9)	Chesapeake Energy Arena; 18,203	9–3
13	November 23	@ Boston	L 100–108	Kevin Durant (29)	Serge Ibaka (13)	Russell Westbrook (8)	TD Garden; 18,624	9–4
14	November 24	@ Philadelphia	W 116–109	Kevin Durant (37)	Serge Ibaka (9)	Russell Westbrook (9)	Wells Fargo Center; 19,611	10–4
15	November 26	Charlotte	W 114–69	Kevin Durant (18)	Hasheem Thabeet (10)	Russell Westbrook (11)	Chesapeake Energy Arena; 18,203	11–4
16	November 28	Houston	W 120–98	Kevin Durant (37)	Serge Ibaka (9)	Russell Westbrook (9)	Chesapeake Energy Arena; 18,203	12–4
17	November 30	Utah	W 106–94	Kevin Durant (25)	Russell Westbrook (13)	Russell Westbrook (8)	Chesapeake Energy Arena; 18,203	13–4

December : 11–2 (home: 7–0; road: 4–2)

Game	Date	Team	Score	High points	High rebounds	High assists	Location Attendance	Record
18	December 1	@ New Orleans	W 100–79	Kevin Durant (20)	Kevin Durant (8)	Russell Westbrook (10)	New Orleans Arena; 14,547	14–4
19	December 4	@ Brooklyn	W 117–111	Kevin Durant (32)	Kendrick Perkins (7)	Russell Westbrook (9)	Barclays Center; 17,732	15–4
20	December 7	L. A. Lakers	W 114–108	Kevin Durant (36)	Kevin Durant (9)	Russell Westbrook (8)	Chesapeake Energy Arena; 18,203	16–4
21	December 9	Indiana	W 104–93	Kevin Durant (27)	Ibaka & Perkins (9)	Russell Westbrook (6)	Chesapeake Energy Arena; 18,203	17–4
22	December 12	New Orleans	W 92–88	Kevin Durant (35)	Kevin Durant (9)	Russell Westbrook (9)	Chesapeake Energy Arena; 18,203	18–4
23	December 14	Sacramento	W 113–103	Kevin Durant (31)	Serge Ibaka (11)	Russell Westbrook (13)	Chesapeake Energy Arena; 18,203	19–4
24	December 17	San Antonio	W 107–93	Serge Ibaka (25)	Serge Ibaka (17)	Russell Westbrook (9)	Chesapeake Energy Arena; 18,203	20–4
25	December 19	@ Atlanta	W 100–92	Kevin Durant (41)	Serge Ibaka (14)	Russell Westbrook (11)	Philips Arena; 16,284	21–4
26	December 20	@ Minnesota	L 93–99	Kevin Durant (33)	Russell Westbrook (11)	Russell Westbrook (9)	Target Center; 17,114	21–5
27	December 25	@ Miami	L 97–103	Kevin Durant (33)	Russell Westbrook (11)	Durant & Westbrook (3)	American Airlines Arena; 20,300	21–6
28	December 27	Dallas	W 111–105	Kevin Durant (40)	Serge Ibaka (17)	Russell Westbrook (10)	Chesapeake Energy Arena; 18,203	22–6
29	December 29	@ Houston	W 124–94	Russell Westbrook (28)	Ibaka & Collison (10)	Russell Westbrook (8)	Toyota Center; 18,460	23–6
30	December 31	Phoenix	W 114–96	Kevin Durant (30)	Nick Collison (9)	Russell Westbrook (9)	Chesapeake Energy Arena; 18,203	24–6

January : 11–5 (home: 4–1; road: 7–4)

Game	Date	Team	Score	High points	High rebounds	High assists	Location Attendance	Record
31	January 2	Brooklyn	L 93–110	Kevin Durant (27)	Kendrick Perkins (11)	Russell Westbrook (10)	Chesapeake Energy Arena; 18,203	24–7
32	January 4	Philadelphia	W 109–85	Russell Westbrook (27)	Serge Ibaka (10)	Russell Westbrook (5)	Chesapeake Energy Arena; 18,203	25–7
33	January 6	@ Toronto	W 104–92	Russell Westbrook (23)	Ibaka & Collison (8)	Durant & Westbrook (7)	Air Canada Centre; 17,634	26–7
34	January 7	@ Washington	L 99–101	Kevin Durant (29)	Ibaka & Perkins (11)	Durant & Westbrook (8)	Verizon Center; 16,917	26–8
35	January 9	Minnesota	W 106–84	Kevin Durant (26)	Durant & Westbrook (8)	Russell Westbrook (8)	Chesapeake Energy Arena; 18,203	27–8
36	January 11	@ L. A. Lakers	W 116–101	Kevin Durant (42)	Perkins & Collison (9)	Russell Westbrook (10)	Staples Center; 18,997	28–8
37	January 13	@ Portland	W 87–83	Kevin Durant (33)	Kendrick Perkins (12)	Russell Westbrook (9)	Rose Garden; 20,423	29–8
38	January 14	@ Phoenix	W 102–90	Kevin Durant (41)	Kendrick Perkins (13)	Russell Westbrook (5)	US Airways Center; 14,951	30–8
39	January 16	Denver	W 117–97	Russell Westbrook (32)	Ibaka & Jackson (6)	Reggie Jackson (7)	Chesapeake Energy Arena; 18,203	31–8
40	January 18	@ Dallas	W 117–114 (OT)	Kevin Durant (52)	Serge Ibaka (14)	Russell Westbrook (6)	American Airlines Center; 20,434	32–8
41	January 20	@ Denver	L 118–121 (OT)	Kevin Durant (37)	Russell Westbrook (8)	Russell Westbrook (9)	Pepsi Center; 19,155	32–9
42	January 22	@ L. A. Clippers	W 109–97	Kevin Durant (32)	Serge Ibaka (9)	Kevin Durant (7)	Staples Center; 19,451	33–9
43	January 23	@ Golden State	L 99–104	Kevin Durant (33)	Kendrick Perkins (6)	Kevin Durant (9)	Oracle Arena; 19,596	33–10
44	January 25	@ Sacramento	W 105–95	Durant & Martin (24)	Kevin Durant (11)	Russell Westbrook (14)	Sleep Train Arena; 15,022	34–10
45	January 27	@ L. A. Lakers	L 96–105	Kevin Durant (35)	Russell Westbrook (9)	Russell Westbrook (13)	Staples Center; 18,997	34–11
46	January 31	Memphis	W 106–89	Kevin Durant (27)	Russell Westbrook (9)	Durant & Westbrook (6)	Chesapeake Energy Arena; 18,203	35–11

February : 7–4 (home: 6–1; road: 1–3)

Game	Date	Team	Score	High points	High rebounds	High assists	Location Attendance	Record
47	February 2	@ Cleveland	L 110–115	Kevin Durant (32)	Serge Ibaka (12)	Westbrook & Perkins (5)	Quicken Loans Arena; 20,562	35–12
48	February 4	Dallas	W 112–91	Russell Westbrook (24)	Kevin Durant (10)	Russell Westbrook (7)	Chesapeake Energy Arena; 18,203	36–12
49	February 6	Golden State	W 119–98	Kevin Durant (25)	Kendrick Perkins (11)	Reggie Jackson (6)	Chesapeake Energy Arena; 18,203	37–12
50	February 8	Phoenix	W 127–96	Kevin Durant (21)	Kendrick Perkins (9)	Russell Westbrook (6)	Chesapeake Energy Arena; 18,203	38–12
51	February 10	@ Phoenix	W 97–69	Russell Westbrook (24)	Durant & Jackson (7)	Russell Westbrook (6)	US Airways Center; 16,773	39–12
52	February 12	@ Utah	L 94–109	Kevin Durant (33)	Kevin Durant (6)	Durant & Westbrook (5)	EnergySolutions Arena; 18,552	39–13
53	February 14	Miami	L 100–110	Kevin Durant (40)	Kevin Durant (8)	Russell Westbrook (10)	Chesapeake Energy Arena; 18,203	39–14
All-Star Break
54	February 20	@ Houston	L 119–122	Westbrook & Sefolosha (28)	Kevin Durant (12)	Kevin Durant (11)	Toyota Center; 18,224	39–15
55	February 22	Minnesota	W 127–111	Russell Westbrook (37)	Durant, Ibaka, Perkins & Westbrook (7)	Russell Westbrook (9)	Chesapeake Energy Arena; 18,203	40–15
56	February 24	Chicago	W 102–72	Russell Westbrook (23)	Kevin Durant (16)	Kevin Durant (6)	Chesapeake Energy Arena; 18,203	41–15
57	February 27	New Orleans	W 119–74	Russell Westbrook (29)	Kevin Durant (11)	Kevin Durant (10)	Chesapeake Energy Arena; 18,203	42–15

March : 12–5 (home: 6–1; road: 6–4)

Game	Date	Team	Score	High points	High rebounds	High assists	Location Attendance	Record
58	March 1	@ Denver	L 103–105	Russell Westbrook (38)	Kevin Durant (14)	Thabo Sefolosha (5)	Pepsi Center; 19,521	42–16
59	March 3	@ L. A. Clippers	W 108–104	Kevin Durant (35)	Kevin Durant (9)	Russell Westbrook (10)	Staples Center; 19,371	43–16
60	March 5	L. A. Lakers	W 122–105	Russell Westbrook (37)	Russell Westbrook (10)	Durant, Martin, & Westbrook (5)	Chesapeake Energy Arena; 18,203	44–16
61	March 7	@ New York	W 95–94	Kevin Durant (34)	Serge Ibaka (9)	Kevin Durant (6)	Madison Square Garden; 19,033	45–16
62	March 8	@ Charlotte	W 116–94	Kevin Durant (19)	Hasheem Thabeet (8)	Kevin Durant (7)	Time Warner Cable Arena; 18,870	46–16
63	March 10	Boston	W 91–79	Kevin Durant (23)	Kevin Durant (11)	Kendrick Perkins (5)	Chesapeake Energy Arena; 18,203	47–16
64	March 11	@ San Antonio	L 93–105	Kevin Durant (26)	Serge Ibaka (16)	Russell Westbrook (6)	AT&T Center; 18,581	47–17
65	March 13	Utah	W 110–87	Kevin Durant (23)	Kevin Durant (10)	Russell Westbrook (9)	Chesapeake Energy Arena; 18,203	48–17
66	March 15	Orlando	W 117–104	Kevin Durant (26)	Kendrick Perkins (12)	Russell Westbrook (6)	Chesapeake Energy Arena; 18,046	49–17
67	March 17	@ Dallas	W 107–101	Russell Westbrook (35)	Serge Ibaka (16)	Russell Westbrook (6)	American Airlines Center; 20,284	50–17
68	March 19	Denver	L 104–114	Kevin Durant (34)	Kendrick Perkins (11)	Russell Westbrook (6)	Chesapeake Energy Arena; 18,203	50–18
69	March 20	@ Memphis	L 89–90 (OT)	Kevin Durant (32)	Kendrick Perkins (16)	Durant & Westbrook (4)	FedExForum; 18,119	50–19
70	March 22	@ Orlando	W 97–89	Kevin Durant (25)	Serge Ibaka (13)	Russell Westbrook (9)	Amway Center; 17,429	51–19
71	March 24	Portland	W 103–83	Kevin Durant (24)	Kevin Durant (10)	Russell Westbrook (9)	Chesapeake Energy Arena; 18,203	52–19
72	March 27	Washington	W 103–80	Russell Westbrook (21)	Kendrick Perkins (11)	Kevin Durant (6)	Chesapeake Energy Arena; 18,203	53–19
73	March 29	@ Minnesota	L 93–101	Kevin Durant (36)	Serge Ibaka (11)	Russell Westbrook (9)	Target Center; 18,121	53–20
74	March 30	@ Milwaukee	W 109–99	Kevin Durant (30)	Russell Westbrook (13)	Russell Westbrook (10)	BMO Harris Bradley Center; 17,578	54–20

April : 6–2 (home: 2–2; road: 4–0)

Game	Date	Team	Score	High points	High rebounds	High assists	Location Attendance	Record
75	April 4	San Antonio	W 100–88	Russell Westbrook (27)	Serge Ibaka (11)	Russell Westbrook (7)	Chesapeake Energy Arena; 18,203	55–20
76	April 5	@ Indiana	W 97–75	Kevin Durant (34)	Kevin Durant (9)	Russell Westbrook (9)	Bankers Life Fieldhouse; 18,165	56–20
77	April 7	New York	L 120–125	Russell Westbrook (37)	Russell Westbrook (11)	Russell Westbrook (8)	Chesapeake Energy Arena; 18,203	56–21
78	April 9	@ Utah	W 90–80	Russell Westbrook (25)	Kevin Durant (12)	Kevin Durant (9)	EnergySolutions Arena; 19,610	57–21
79	April 11	@ Golden State	W 116–97	Kevin Durant (31)	Kevin Durant (10)	Russell Westbrook (9)	Oracle Arena; 19,596	58–21
80	April 12	@ Portland	W 106–90	Russell Westbrook (33)	Ronnie Brewer (7)	Kevin Durant (6)	Rose Garden; 20,577	59–21
81	April 15	Sacramento	W 104–95	Kevin Durant (29)	Ronnie Brewer (13)	Durant & Westbrook (8)	Chesapeake Energy Arena; 18,203	60–21
82	April 17	Milwaukee	L 89–95	Reggie Jackson (23)	Perry Jones III (9)	Reggie Jackson (5)	Chesapeake Energy Arena; 18,203	60–22

2012–13 season schedule

=== Playoffs ===
2013 playoff game log
First Round: 4–2 (home: 2–1; road: 2–1)

Game	Date	Team	Score	High points	High rebounds	High assists	Location Attendance	Series
1	April 21	Houston	W 120–91	Kevin Durant (24)	Russell Westbrook (8)	Russell Westbrook (10)	Chesapeake Energy Arena; 18,203	1–0
2	April 24	Houston	W 105–102	Durant & Westbrook (29)	Serge Ibaka (11)	Kevin Durant (9)	Chesapeake Energy Arena; 18,203	2–0
3	April 27	@ Houston	W 104–101	Kevin Durant (41)	Kevin Durant (11)	Kevin Durant (4)	Toyota Center; 18,163	3–0
4	April 29	@ Houston	L 103–105	Kevin Durant (38)	Kevin Durant (8)	Kevin Durant (6)	Toyota Center; 18,081	3–1
5	May 1	Houston	L 100–107	Kevin Durant (36)	Serge Ibaka (9)	Kevin Durant (7)	Chesapeake Energy Arena; 18,203	3–2
6	May 3	@ Houston	W 103–94	Kevin Durant (27)	Nick Collison (9)	Reggie Jackson (8)	Toyota Center; 18,357	4–2

Conference Semifinals: 1–4 (home: 1–2; road: 0–2)

Game	Date	Team	Score	High points	High rebounds	High assists	Location Attendance	Series
1	May 5	Memphis	W 93–91	Kevin Durant (35)	Kevin Durant (15)	Kevin Durant (6)	Chesapeake Energy Arena; 18,203	1–0
2	May 7	Memphis	L 93–99	Kevin Durant (36)	Kevin Durant (11)	Mike Conley Jr. (9)	Chesapeake Energy Arena; 18,203	1–1
3	May 11	@ Memphis	L 81–87	Kevin Durant (25)	Kevin Durant (11)	Mike Conley Jr. (6)	FedExForum; 18,119	1–2
4	May 13	@ Memphis	L 97–103 (OT)	Kevin Durant (27)	Serge Ibaka (14)	Reggie Jackson (8)	FedExForum; 18,119	1–3
5	May 15	Memphis	L 84–88	Zach Randolph (28)	Zach Randolph (14)	Mike Conley Jr. (11)	Chesapeake Energy Arena; 18,203	1–4

2013 playoff schedule

== Player statistics ==
Legend
GP	Games played	GS	Games started	MPG	Minutes per game
FG%	Field goal percentage	3P%	3-point field goal percentage	FT%	Free throw percentage
RPG	Rebounds per game	APG	Assists per game	SPG	Steals per game
BPG	Blocks per game	PPG	Points per game	**Bold**	Career high

=== Regular season ===
Oklahoma City Thunder statistics
Player	GP	GS	MPG	FG%	3P%	FT%	RPG	APG	SPG	BPG	PPG
Ronnie Brewer ^{≠}	14	0	10.1	26.1%	20.0%	-	2.9	0.7	0.6	0.0	0.9
Nick Collison	81	2	19.5	59.5%	0.0%	76.9%	4.1	1.5	0.6	0.4	5.1
Kevin Durant	81	81	38.5	51.0%	41.6%	90.5%	7.9	4.6	1.4	1.3	28.1
Derek Fisher ^{≠}	24	0	14.4	33.3%	35.1%	93.3%	0.9	0.7	0.6	0.0	4.1
Serge Ibaka	80	80	31.1	57.3%	35.1%	74.9%	7.7	0.5	0.4	3.0	13.2
Reggie Jackson	70	0	14.2	45.8%	23.1%	83.9%	2.4	1.7	0.4	0.2	5.2
Perry Jones	38	1	7.4	39.4%	0.0%	66.7%	1.6	0.3	0.1	0.2	2.3
Jeremy Lamb	23	0	6.4	35.3%	30.0%	100%	0.8	2.2	0.1	0.1	3.1
DeAndre Liggins	39	1	7.4	44.7%	36.8%	50.0%	1.4	0.4	0.5	0.1	1.5
Kevin Martin	77	0	27.7	45.0%	42.6%	89.0%	2.3	1.4	0.9	0.1	14.0
Eric Maynor ^{†}	37	0	10.6	31.3%	32.6%	81.0%	0.5	2.0	0.3	0.0	2.8
Daniel Orton	13	0	8.0	46.2%	-	52.9%	2.0	0.3	0.3	0.2	2.5
Kendrick Perkins	78	78	25.1	45.7%	0.0%	61.1%	6.0	1.4	0.6	1.1	4.2
Thabo Sefolosha	81	81	27.5	48.1%	41.9%	82.6%	3.9	1.5	1.3	0.5	7.6
Hasheem Thabeet	66	4	11.7	60.4%	-	60.4%	3.0	0.2	0.5	0.9	2.4
Russell Westbrook	82	82	34.9	43.8%	32.3%	80.0%	5.2	7.4	1.8	0.3	23.2

Led team in statistic

After all games.
^{‡} Waived during the season
^{†} Traded during the season
^{≠} Acquired during the season

=== Playoffs ===
Oklahoma City Thunder statistics
Player	GP	GS	MPG	FG%	3P%	FT%	RPG	APG	SPG	BPG	PPG
Ronnie Brewer	1	0	8.0	-	-	-	1.0	0.0	0.0	0.0	0.0
Nick Collison	11	0	16.2	46.8%	-	91.7%	4.6	1.1	0.5	1.0	5.0
Kevin Durant	11	11	44.1	45.5%	31.4%	83.0%	9.0	6.3	1.3	1.1	30.8
Derek Fisher	11	0	23.7	45.7%	47.1%	66.7%	1.5	0.7	0.6	0.1	8.7
Serge Ibaka	11	11	33.3	43.7%	44.4%	79.2%	8.4	0.7	0.0	3.0	12.8
Reggie Jackson	11	9	33.5	47.9%	30.2%	89.7%	4.9	3.6	0.5	0.5	13.9
Perry Jones	1	0	5.0	0.0%	-	-	1.0	0.0	0.0	0.0	0.0
DeAndre Liggins	8	0	8.5	33.3%	20.0%	25.0%	1.8	0.5	0.1	0.1	1.0
Kevin Martin	11	0	29.4	38.0%	37.0%	90.7%	3.1	1.3	0.6	0.3	14.0
Kendrick Perkins	11	11	19.1	26.3%	0.0%	100%	3.7	0.6	0.7	0.5	2.2
Thabo Sefolosha	11	11	27.3	34.4%	31.6%	81.8%	4.5	2.1	1.1	0.5	5.7
Hasheem Thabeet	4	0	6.5	50.0%	-	-	1.5	0.0	0.3	0.0	0.5
Russell Westbrook	2	2	34.0	41.5%	22.2%	85.7%	6.5	7.0	3.0	0.0	24.0

Led team in statistic

After all games.

=== Individual game highs ===
Category	Player	Statistic
Points	Kevin Durant	52 vs Mavericks on January 18, 2013
Rebounds	Kevin Durant; Serge Ibaka; Serge Ibaka	17 vs Trail Blazers on November 2, 2012; 17 vs Spurs on December 17, 2012; 17 vs Mavericks on December 27, 2012
Assists	Russell Westbrook	14 vs Kings on January 25, 2013
Steals	Russell Westbrook	7 vs Jazz on November 30, 2012
Blocks	Serge Ibaka	8 vs Bucks on March 30, 2013
Minutes	Kevin Durant	49:40 vs Mavericks on January 18, 2013

Category	Player	Statistic
Field goals made	Kevin Durant	16 vs Lakers on January 11, 2013
Threes made	Kevin Martin; Kevin Martin; Thabo Sefolosha	6 vs Hawks on November 4, 2012; 6 vs Hornets on November 16, 2012; 6 vs Rockets on February 20, 2013
Free throws made	Kevin Durant	21 vs Mavericks on January 18, 2013
Double-doubles	Russell Westbrook	23
Triple-doubles	Kevin Durant	3

== Awards and records ==
=== Awards ===
Date	Player	Award
November 19, 2012	Kevin Durant (1/4)	November 12–18 Player of the Week
December 3, 2012	Kevin Durant (2/4)	November 26-December 2 Player of the Week
December 6, 2012	Kevin Durant (1/2)	October/November Player of the Month
January 14, 2013	Kevin Durant (3/4)	January 7–13 Player of the Week
January 21, 2013	Kevin Durant (4/4)	January 14–20 Player of the Week
February 11, 2013	Russell Westbrook (1/1)	February 4–10 Player of the Week
April 5, 2013	Kevin Durant (2/2)	March Player of the Month
May 13, 2013	Serge Ibaka	All-Defensive First Team
May 23, 2013	Kevin Durant	All-NBA First Team
May 23, 2013	Russell Westbrook	All-NBA Second Team

== Transactions ==
=== Overview ===
Players Added

Via draft

- Perry Jones

Via trade

- Jeremy Lamb
- Kevin Martin

Via free agency

- Daniel Orton
- Hasheem Thabeet
Players Lost

Via trade

- Cole Aldrich
- Daequan Cook
- James Harden
- Lazar Hayward

Via free agency

- Derek Fisher
- Royal Ivey
- Nazr Mohammed

=== Trades ===
October 27, 2012	To Oklahoma City Thunder Jeremy Lamb; Kevin Martin; 2013 first-round pick 2013 second-round pick 2014 first-round pick	To Houston Rockets Cole Aldrich; Daequan Cook; James Harden; Lazar Hayward
February 21, 2013	To Oklahoma City Thunder Ronnie Brewer	To New York Knicks 2014 second-round pick Cash considerations
February 21, 2013	To Oklahoma City Thunder Draft rights to Georgios Printezis	To Portland Trail Blazers Eric Maynor

=== Free agency ===
==== Re-signed ====
Date	Player	Contract
August 18, 2012	Serge Ibaka	Multi-Year Extension

==== Additions ====
Date	Player	Contract	Former team
July 11, 2012	Hasheem Thabeet	Standard	Portland Trail Blazers
September 12, 2012	DeAndre Liggins	Standard	Orlando Magic
October 31, 2012	Daniel Orton	Standard	Orlando Magic
In-Season Additions
February 25, 2012	Derek Fisher	Standard	Dallas Mavericks

==== Subtractions ====
Date	Player	Reason left	New team
July 27, 2012	Royal Ivey	Free Agent	Philadelphia 76ers
July 27, 2012	Nazr Mohammed	Free Agent	Chicago Bulls
November 28, 2012	Derek Fisher	Free Agent	Dallas Mavericks
