= 2012–13 New Orleans Hornets season =

NBA basketball season

- Head coach: Monty Williams
- General manager: Dell Demps
- Owner: Tom Benson
- Arena: New Orleans Arena

Results
- Record: 27–55 (.329)
- Place: Division: 5th (Southwest); Conference: 14th (Western)
- Playoff finish: Did not qualify
- Stats at Basketball Reference

Local media
- Television: Fox Sports New Orleans
- Radio: WWL-FM

The 2012–13 New Orleans Hornets season was the 11th (Note: At the time, this season was considered the 25th season in franchise history, being viewed as a relocation from Charlotte. In 2014, after this team was rebranded as the Pelicans, the name and the statistical history of the original team was reclaimed by the present day Charlotte Hornets, who had begun play in 2004 as an expansion team known as the Charlotte Bobcats.) season of the franchise in the National Basketball Association (NBA). It was also the final season the New Orleans franchise played with the Hornets name; the team would change their name to the New Orleans Pelicans shortly after the conclusion of the regular season.

After finishing with the second-worst record in the league the previous season, the Hornets held the first overall pick in the 2012 NBA draft and selected Anthony Davis. The Hornets finished the season with a 27–55 record, a six-game improvement over the previous season; however, they missed the playoffs.

== Key dates ==
- May 30: The 2012 NBA Draft Lottery took place at Prudential Center in Newark, New Jersey. The New Orleans Hornets won the 1st and 10th overall picks in the draft.
- June 28: The 2012 NBA draft took place at Prudential Center in Newark, New Jersey.

== Draft picks ==
Round	Pick	Player	Position	Nationality	College/Team
1	1	Anthony Davis	PF/C	United States	Kentucky
1	10	Austin Rivers	PG/SG	United States	Duke
2	46	Darius Miller	SF	United States	Kentucky

The Hornets entered the draft with two first-round selections and one second-round selection. The first overall pick is their original selection, while the rest were acquired through previous trades. They had traded their original second-round selection to the Miami Heat, who then traded the pick to the Cleveland Cavaliers as part of the 2010 LeBron James sign-and-trade deal. This was the franchise's last draft appearance under the New Orleans Hornets name as they would be renamed as the Pelicans the following year.

== Roster ==
2012–13 New Orleans Hornets roster
Players

Pos.	No.	Player	Height	Weight	DOB	From
SF	0	Al-Farouq Aminu	6 ft 9 in (2.06 m)	215 lb (98 kg)	1990-09-21	Wake Forest
PF	17	Lou Amundson	6 ft 9 in (2.06 m)	225 lb (102 kg)	1982-12-07	UNLV
PF	33	Ryan Anderson	6 ft 10 in (2.08 m)	240 lb (109 kg)	1988-05-06	California
PF	23	Anthony Davis	6 ft 10 in (2.08 m)	220 lb (100 kg)	1993-03-11	Kentucky
SG	10	Eric Gordon	6 ft 3 in (1.91 m)	215 lb (98 kg)	1988-12-25	Indiana
SG	12	Terrel Harris	6 ft 4 in (1.93 m)	190 lb (86 kg)	1987-08-10	Oklahoma State
SF	4	Xavier Henry	6 ft 6 in (1.98 m)	220 lb (100 kg)	1991-03-15	Kansas
C	15	Robin Lopez	7 ft 0 in (2.13 m)	255 lb (116 kg)	1988-04-01	Stanford
SG	8	Roger Mason	6 ft 5 in (1.96 m)	205 lb (93 kg)	1980-09-10	Virginia
SF	2	Darius Miller (DL)	6 ft 8 in (2.03 m)	235 lb (107 kg)	1990-03-21	Kentucky
SG	25	Austin Rivers	6 ft 4 in (1.93 m)	200 lb (91 kg)	1992-08-01	Duke
PG	22	Brian Roberts	6 ft 1 in (1.85 m)	180 lb (82 kg)	1985-12-03	Dayton
C	14	Jason Smith	7 ft 0 in (2.13 m)	240 lb (109 kg)	1986-03-02	Colorado State
SF	42	Lance Thomas	6 ft 8 in (2.03 m)	225 lb (102 kg)	1988-04-24	Duke
PG	21	Greivis Vásquez	6 ft 6 in (1.98 m)	211 lb (96 kg)	1987-01-16	Maryland

Coaches
Head coach
- Monty Williams
Assistant(s)
- Dave Hanners
- Fred Vinson
- Bryan Gates
- Jon Ishop (trainer)

Legend
- (DP) Unsigned draft pick
- (FA) Free agent
- (S) Suspended
- (DL) On assignment to D-League affiliate
- Injured

Roster
Updated: March 12, 2013

== Pre-season ==
2012 pre-season game log
Pre-season: 4–4 (home: 2–2; road: 2–2)

Game	Date	Team	Score	High points	High rebounds	High assists	Location Attendance	Record
1	October 7	Orlando	W 85–80	Brian Roberts (17)	Davis & Anderson (8)	Greivis Vásquez (6)	Mexico City Arena; 18,133	1–0
2	October 9	Charlotte	W 97–82	Anthony Davis (22)	Robin Lopez (13)	Greivis Vásquez (11)	New Orleans Arena; 9,264	2–0
3	October 11	@ Charlotte	W 90–87	Brian Roberts (16)	Anthony Davis (9)	Brian Roberts (8)	North Charleston Coliseum -	3–0
4	October 12	@ Houston	L 75–95	Al Farouq Aminu (15)	Lopez & Thomas (8)	Greivis Vásquez (5)	Toyota Center; 10,718	3–1
5	October 18	@ Atlanta	L 68–97	Anthony Davis (19)	Davis & Anderson (7)	Greivis Vásquez (7)	Philips Arena; 8,563	3–2
6	October 22	@ Dallas	L 74–87	Lopez & Anderson (14)	Anthony Davis (17)	Greivis Vásquez (5)	American Airlines Center; 16,982	3-3
7	October 24	Houston	L 90–97	Ryan Anderson (23)	Davis, Lopez & Anderson (8)	Greivis Vásquez (11)	New Orleans Arena; 9,278	3–4
8	October 26	@ Miami	W 96–89	Anthony Davis (24)	Anthony Davis (11)	Greivis Vásquez (10)	American Airlines Arena; 19,600	4-4

2012–13 season schedule

== Regular season ==
=== Game log ===
2012–13 game log
Total: 27–55 (Home: 16–25; Road: 11–30)
October: 0–1 (home: 0–1; road: 0–0)

Game	Date	Team	Score	High points	High rebounds	High assists	Location Attendance	Record
1	October 31	San Antonio	L 95–99	Anthony Davis (21)	Robin Lopez (9)	Greivis Vásquez (13)	New Orleans Arena; 15,358	0–1

November : 4–9 (home: 2–4; road: 2–5)

Game	Date	Team	Score	High points	High rebounds	High assists	Location Attendance	Record
2	November 2	Utah	W 88–86	Anderson & Lopez (19)	Al Farouq Aminu (8)	Greivis Vásquez (10)	New Orleans Arena; 14,147	1-1
3	November 3	@ Chicago	W 89–82	Greivis Vásquez (18)	Ryan Anderson (13)	Greivis Vásquez (6)	United Center; 21,758	2–1
4	November 7	Philadelphia	L 62–77	Al Farouq Aminu (10)	Al Farouq Aminu (16)	Greivis Vásquez (7)	New Orleans Arena; 12,988	2-2
5	November 9	Charlotte	W 107–99	Ryan Anderson (25)	Anthony Davis (11)	Greivis Vásquez (8)	New Orleans Arena; 12,668	3–2
6	November 14	@ Houston	L 96–100	Greivis Vásquez (24)	Ryan Anderson (12)	Greivis Vásquez (9)	Toyota Center; 14,535	3-3
7	November 16	Oklahoma City	L 95–110	Ryan Anderson (15)	Anthony Davis (11)	Roberts & Vasquez (7)	New Orleans Arena; 15,458	3–4
8	November 17	@ Milwaukee	L 113–117	Anthony Davis (28)	Anthony Davis (11)	Greivis Vásquez (11)	BMO Harris Bradley Center; 14,731	3–5
9	November 20	New York	L 80–102	Ryan Anderson (15)	Ryan Anderson (8)	Greivis Vásquez (6)	New Orleans Arena; 13,705	3–6
10	November 21	@ Indiana	L 107–115	Robin Lopez (21)	Robin Lopez (13)	Greivis Vásquez (8)	Bankers Life Fieldhouse; 12,633	3–7
11	November 23	@ Phoenix	L 108–111	Ryan Anderson (34)	Ryan Anderson (11)	Greivis Vásquez (14)	US Airways Center; 14,020	3–8
12	November 25	@ Denver	L 84–102	Brian Roberts (17)	Darius Miller (8)	Rivers & Vasquez (6)	Pepsi Center; 15,402	3–9
13	November 26	@ L.A. Clippers	W 105–98	Greivis Vásquez (25)	Aminu & Anderson (9)	Greivis Vásquez (10)	Staples Center; 19,060	4–9
14	November 28	Utah	W 96–84	Lopez & Vasquez (18)	Jason Smith (9)	Greivis Vásquez (8)	New Orleans Arena; 10,693	4–10

December : 3–13 (home: 1–7; road: 2–6)

Game	Date	Team	Score	High points	High rebounds	High assists	Location Attendance	Record
15	December 1	Oklahoma City	L 79–100	Ryan Anderson (21)	Ryan Anderson (10)	Greivis Vásquez (7)	New Orleans Arena; 14,547	4–11
16	December 3	Milwaukee	W 102–81	Ryan Anderson (22)	Ryan Anderson (7)	Greivis Vásquez (9)	New Orleans Arena; 12,321	5–11
17	December 5	L.A. Lakers	L 87–103	Ryan Anderson (31)	Al Farouq Aminu (10)	Greivis Vásquez (9)	New Orleans Arena; 18,449	5–12
18	December 7	Memphis	L 89–96	Anderson, Rivers & Roberts (15)	Jason Smith (5)	Greivis Vásquez (8)	New Orleans Arena; 13,698	5–13
19	December 8	@ Miami	L 90–106	Ryan Anderson (24)	Robin Lopez (8)	Greivis Vásquez (7)	American Airlines Arena; 19,600	5–14
20	December 11	Washington	L 70–77	Ryan Anderson (17)	Ryan Anderson (11)	Greivis Vásquez (5)	New Orleans Arena; 10,076	5–15
21	December 12	@ Oklahoma City	L 88–92	Ryan Anderson (14)	Robin Lopez (8)	Anderson & Vásquez (5)	Chesapeake Energy Arena; 18,203	5–16
22	December 14	Minnesota	L 102–113	Austin Rivers (27)	Al Farouq Aminu (8)	Greivis Vásquez (17)	New Orleans Arena; 14,671	5–17
23	December 16	@ Portland	L 94–95	Ryan Anderson (26)	Greivis Vásquez (8)	Greivis Vásquez (11)	Rose Garden; 18,772	5–18
24	December 18	@ Golden State	L 96–103	Ryan Anderson (28)	Anthony Davis (16)	Greivis Vásquez (11)	Oracle Arena; 19,596	5–19
25	December 19	@ L.A. Clippers	L 77–93	Robin Lopez (22)	Robin Lopez (9)	Greivis Vásquez (10)	Staples Center; 19,188	5-20
26	December 21	@ San Antonio	L 94–99	Anthony Davis (18)	Anthony Davis (11)	Greivis Vásquez (4)	AT&T Center; 17,943	5-21
27	December 22	Indiana	L 75–81	Robin Lopez (24)	Robin Lopez (11)	Greivis Vásquez (8)	New Orleans Arena; 15,042	5-22
28	December 26	@ Orlando	W 97–94	Robin Lopez (29)	Anthony Davis (11)	Greivis Vásquez (8)	Amway Center; 18,846	6-22
29	December 28	Toronto	L 97–104	Anthony Davis (25)	Ryan Anderson (12)	Greivis Vásquez (14)	New Orleans Arena; 13,968	6-23
30	December 29	@ Charlotte	W 98–95	Eric Gordon (24)	Anthony Davis (10)	Greivis Vásquez (8)	Time Warner Cable Arena; 18,110	7–23

January : 8–8 (home: 4–3; road: 4–5)

Game	Date	Team	Score	High points	High rebounds	High assists	Location Attendance	Record
31	January 1	Atlanta	L 86–95	Ryan Anderson (23)	Anthony Davis (13)	Greivis Vásquez (10)	New Orleans Arena; 12,712	7-24
32	January 2	@ Houston	L 92–104	Ryan Anderson (18)	Aminu & Lopez (8)	Greivis Vásquez (14)	Toyota Center; 18,198	7-25
33	January 5	@ Dallas	W 99–96	Greivis Vásquez (25)	Al Farouq Aminu (13)	Greivis Vásquez (9)	American Airlines Center; 20,338	8-25
34	January 7	San Antonio	W 95–88	Eric Gordon (24)	Al Farouq Aminu (10)	Greivis Vásquez (11)	New Orleans Arena; 11,599	9-25
35	January 9	Houston	W 88–79	Mason Jr., Smith, & Vásquez (17)	Aminu & Smith (10)	Greivis Vásquez (11)	New Orleans Arena; 11,453	10–25
36	January 11	Minnesota	W 104–92	Greivis Vásquez (18)	Al-Farouq Aminu (13)	Greivis Vásquez (13)	New Orleans Arena; 13,538	11–25
37	January 13	@ New York	L 87–100	Eric Gordon (22)	Al-Farouq Aminu (11)	Greivis Vásquez (6)	Madison Square Garden; 19,033	11–26
38	January 15	@ Philadelphia	W 111–99	Greivis Vásquez (23)	Ryan Anderson (9)	Greivis Vásquez (9)	Wells Fargo Center; 17,304	12–26
39	January 16	@ Boston	W 90–78	Al-Farouq Aminu (18)	Greivis Vásquez (11)	Greivis Vásquez (4)	TD Garden; 18,624	13–26
40	January 19	Golden State	L 112–116	Eric Gordon (23)	Anthony Davis (12)	Greivis Vásquez (15)	New Orleans Arena; 15,472	13–27
41	January 21	Sacramento	W 114–105	Ryan Anderson (27)	Al-Farouq Aminu (11)	Greivis Vásquez (11)	New Orleans Arena; 10,880	14–27
42	January 23	@ San Antonio	L 102–106	Eric Gordon (17)	Al-Farouq Aminu (12)	Greivis Vásquez (11)	AT&T Center; 17,511	14–28
43	January 25	Houston	L 82–100	Eric Gordon (20)	Anthony Davis (7)	Greivis Vásquez (6)	New Orleans Arena; 15,302	14–29
44	January 27	@ Memphis	W 91–83	Ryan Anderson (22)	Al-Farouq Aminu (12)	Greivis Vásquez (11)	FedExForum; 16,277	15–29
45	January 29	@ L.A. Lakers	L 106–111	Eric Gordon (25)	Robin Lopez (9)	Greivis Vásquez (15)	Staples Center; 18,997	15–30
46	January 30	@ Utah	L 99–104	Greivis Vásquez (17)	Al-Farouq Aminu (13)	Greivis Vásquez (13)	EnergySolutions Arena; 17,490	15–31

February : 5–8 (home: 3–3; road: 2–5)

Game	Date	Team	Score	High points	High rebounds	High assists	Location Attendance	Record
47	February 1	@ Denver	L 98–113	Ryan Anderson (21)	Anthony Davis (10)	Greivis Vásquez (9)	Pepsi Center; 17,221	15–32
48	February 2	@ Minnesota	L 86–115	Anthony Davis (18)	Greivis Vásquez (6)	Greivis Vásquez (7)	Target Center; 16,289	15–33
49	February 6	Phoenix	W 93–84	Greivis Vásquez (19)	Al-Farouq Aminu (11)	Greivis Vásquez (12)	New Orleans Arena; 12,148	16–33
50	February 8	@ Atlanta	W 111–100	Eric Gordon (27)	Greivis Vásquez (11)	Greivis Vásquez (12)	Philips Arena; 14,022	17–33
51	February 10	@ Toronto	L 89–102	Robin Lopez (19)	Greivis Vásquez (7)	Greivis Vásquez (6)	Air Canada Centre; 17,177	17–34
52	February 11	@ Detroit	W 105–86	Ryan Anderson (31)	Al-Farouq Aminu (14)	Greivis Vásquez (13)	The Palace of Auburn Hills; 10,177	18–34
53	February 13	Portland	W 99–63	Anthony Davis (21)	Anthony Davis (11)	Greivis Vásquez (8)	New Orleans Arena; 11,656	19–34
All-Star Break
54	February 19	Chicago	L 87–96	Eric Gordon (20)	Anthony Davis (10)	Greivis Vásquez (10)	New Orleans Arena; 13,612	19–35
55	February 20	@ Cleveland	L 100–105	Brian Roberts (17)	Al-Farouq Aminu (10)	Greivis Vásquez (8)	Quicken Loans Arena; 16,103	19–36
56	February 22	Dallas	L 100–104	Eric Gordon (23)	Ryan Anderson (12)	Greivis Vásquez (11)	New Orleans Arena; 16,538	19–37
57	February 24	Sacramento	W 110–95	Anthony Davis (20)	Ryan Anderson (9)	Greivis Vásquez (13)	New Orleans Arena; 12,788	20–37
58	February 26	Brooklyn	L 97–101	Greivis Vásquez (20)	Greivis Vásquez (8)	Greivis Vásquez (7)	New Orleans Arena; 12,651	20–38
59	February 27	@ Oklahoma City	L 74–119	Ryan Anderson (14)	Al-Farouq Aminu (7)	Greivis Vásquez (7)	Chesapeake Energy Arena; 18,203	20–39

March : 6–9 (home: 6–5; road: 0–4)

Game	Date	Team	Score	High points	High rebounds	High assists	Location Attendance	Record
60	March 1	Detroit	W 100–95	Greivis Vásquez (25)	Al-Farouq Aminu (14)	Greivis Vásquez (9)	New Orleans Arena; 14,189	21–39
61	March 4	Orlando	L 102–105	Anthony Davis (17)	Anthony Davis (15)	Greivis Vásquez (8)	New Orleans Arena; 11,050	21–40
62	March 6	L.A. Lakers	L 102–108	Eric Gordon (18)	Al-Farouq Aminu (16)	Greivis Vásquez (12)	New Orleans Arena; 16,019	21–41
63	March 9	@ Memphis	L 85–96	Anthony Davis (20)	Anthony Davis (18)	Greivis Vásquez (8)	FedEx Forum; 17,501	21–42
64	March 10	Portland	W 98–96	Greivis Vásquez (20)	Ryan Anderson (13)	Brian Roberts (9)	New Orleans Arena; 15,036	22–42
65	March 12	@ Brooklyn	L 98–108	Eric Gordon (24)	Anthony Davis (11)	Greivis Vásquez (14)	Barclays Center; 17,732	22–43
66	March 15	@ Washington	L 87–96	Eric Gordon (20)	Al-Farouq Aminu (8)	Greivis Vásquez (9)	Verizon Center; 14,942	22–44
67	March 17	@ Minnesota	L 95–97	Greivis Vásquez (24)	Robin Lopez (11)	Greivis Vásquez (5)	Target Center; 14,246	22–45
68	March 18	Golden State	L 72–93	Ryan Anderson (21)	Ryan Anderson (9)	Greivis Vásquez (9)	New Orleans Arena; 11,844	22–46
69	March 20	Boston	W 87–86	Ryan Anderson (21)	Al-Farouq Aminu (9)	Greivis Vásquez (6)	New Orleans Arena; 14,740	23–46
70	March 22	Memphis	W 90–83	Robin Lopez (23)	Anthony Davis (15)	Greivis Vásquez (9)	New Orleans Arena; 16,494	24–46
71	March 25	Denver	W 110–86	Ryan Anderson (23)	Ryan Anderson (9)	Brian Roberts (18)	New Orleans Arena; 11,185	25–46
72	March 27	L.A. Clippers	L 91–105	Eric Gordon (24)	Anthony Davis (9)	Greivis Vásquez (4)	New Orleans Arena; 15,128	25–47
73	March 29	Miami	L 89–108	Ryan Anderson (20)	Al-Farouq Aminu (16)	Brian Roberts (5)	New Orleans Arena; 18,647	25–48
74	March 31	Cleveland	W 112–92	Greivis Vásquez (25)	Anthony Davis (13)	Greivis Vásquez (9)	New Orleans Arena; 11,008	26–48

April : 1–7 (home: 0–2; road: 1–5)

Game	Date	Team	Score	High points	High rebounds	High assists	Location Attendance	Record
75	April 3	@ Golden State	L 88–98	Eric Gordon (21)	Anthony Davis (9)	Greivis Vásquez (9)	Oracle Arena; 19,596	26–49
76	April 5	@ Utah	L 83–95	Anthony Davis (24)	Anthony Davis (12)	Greivis Vásquez (9)	EnergySolutions Arena; 18,023	26–50
77	April 7	@ Phoenix	W 95–92	Anthony Davis (20)	Aminu & Anderson (10)	Greivis Vásquez (7)	US Airways Center; 16,780	27–50
78	April 9	@ L.A. Lakers	L 96–104	Eric Gordon (22)	Anthony Davis (14)	Greivis Vásquez (9)	Staples Center; 18,997	27–51
79	April 10	@ Sacramento	L 110–121	Eric Gordon (23)	Anthony Davis (10)	Eric Gordon (7)	Sleep Train Arena; 14,275	27–52
80	April 12	L.A. Clippers	L 93–96	Eric Gordon (25)	Robin Lopez (12)	Brian Roberts (11)	New Orleans Arena; 15,206	27–53
81	April 14	Dallas	L 89–107	Ryan Anderson (20)	Robin Lopez (13)	Brian Roberts (6)	New Orleans Arena; 17,246	27–54
82	April 17	@ Dallas	L 87–99	Aminu & Gordon (16)	Al-Farouq Aminu (20)	Brian Roberts (6)	American Airlines Center; 19,973	27–55

2012–13 season schedule

=== Standings ===
Southwest Division	W	L	PCT	GB	Home	Road	Div	GP
y-San Antonio Spurs	58	24	.707	–	35–6	23–18	12–4	82
x-Memphis Grizzlies	56	26	.683	2	32–9	24–17	10–6	82
x-Houston Rockets	45	37	.549	13	29–12	16–25	6–10	82
Dallas Mavericks	41	41	.500	17	24–17	17–24	7–9	82
New Orleans Hornets	27	55	.329	31	16–25	11–30	5–11	82

Western Conference
#	Team	W	L	PCT	GB	GP
1	c-Oklahoma City Thunder *	60	22	.732	–	82
2	y-San Antonio Spurs *	58	24	.707	2.0	82
3	x-Denver Nuggets *	57	25	.695	3.0	82
4	y-Los Angeles Clippers	56	26	.683	4.0	82
5	x-Memphis Grizzlies	56	26	.683	4.0	82
6	x-Golden State Warriors	47	35	.573	13.0	82
7	x-Los Angeles Lakers	45	37	.549	15.0	82
8	x-Houston Rockets	45	37	.549	15.0	82
9	Utah Jazz	43	39	.524	17.0	82
10	Dallas Mavericks	41	41	.500	19.0	82
11	Portland Trail Blazers	33	49	.402	27.0	82
12	Minnesota Timberwolves	31	51	.378	29.0	82
13	Sacramento Kings	28	54	.341	32.0	82
14	New Orleans Hornets	27	55	.329	33.0	82
15	Phoenix Suns	25	57	.305	35.0	82

== Player statistics ==
Legend
GP	Games played	GS	Games started	MPG	Minutes per game
FG%	Field-goal percentage	3P%	3-point field-goal percentage	FT%	Free-throw percentage
RPG	Rebounds per game	APG	Assists per game	SPG	Steals per game
BPG	Blocks per game	PPG	Points per game

=== Regular season ===
Player	GP	GS	MPG	FG%	3P%	FT%	RPG	APG	SPG	BPG	PPG
Robin Lopez	82	82	26.0	.534		.778	5.6	.8	.4	1.6	11.3
Ryan Anderson	81	22	30.9	.423	.382	.844	6.4	1.2	.5	.4	16.2
Greivis Vásquez	78	78	34.4	.433	.342	.805	4.3	9.0	.8	.1	13.9
Brian Roberts	78	5	17.0	.417	.386	.909	1.2	2.8	.5	.0	7.1
Al-Farouq Aminu	76	71	27.2	.475	.211	.737	7.7	1.4	1.2	.7	7.3
Roger Mason Jr.	69	13	17.7	.433	.415	.907	1.9	1.1	.4	.2	5.3
Anthony Davis	64	60	28.8	.516	.000	.751	8.2	1.0	1.2	1.8	13.5
Austin Rivers	61	26	23.2	.372	.326	.546	1.8	2.1	.4	.1	6.2
Lance Thomas	59	9	10.9	.500		.729	1.9	.3	.2	.1	2.5
Darius Miller	52	2	13.3	.407	.393	1.000	1.5	.8	.3	.2	2.3
Jason Smith	51	0	17.2	.490	.000	.843	3.6	.7	.3	.9	8.2
Xavier Henry	50	2	12.5	.410	.364	.630	1.8	.3	.3	.1	3.9
Eric Gordon	42	40	30.1	.402	.324	.842	1.8	3.3	1.1	.2	17.0
Lou Amundson^{†}	18	0	11.6	.429		.500	3.2	.4	.5	.3	2.4
Terrel Harris^{†}	13	0	8.3	.105	.000	.500	1.3	.5	.2	.2	.4
Dominic McGuire^{†}	9	0	16.1	.429		.500	3.1	1.0	.9	.3	2.1
Donald Sloan^{†}	3	0	2.0				.0	.3	.0	.0	.0
Henry Sims	2	0	2.5	.667			1.0	.0	.0	.0	2.0
Hakim Warrick^{†}	1	0	7.0	.500		1.000	.0	.0	1.0	.0	4.0

- ^{†} Denotes player spent time with another team in the season. Stats reflect time with the Hornets only.

== Transactions ==
=== Trades ===
June
June 20	To Washington Wizards: Trevor Ariza; Emeka Okafor	To New Orleans Pelicans: Rashard Lewis; 2012 46th pick

July
July 8	To Orlando Magic: Gustavo Ayon	To New Orleans Pelicans: Ryan Anderson

July
July 13	To Minnesota Timberwolves: 2017 Pelicans Protected 2nd Round Pick	To New Orleans Pelicans: Brad Miller (retired); 2013 Brooklyn Nets 2nd Round Pick; 2016 Minnesota Timberwolves 2nd Round Pick

July
July 27	To Phoenix Suns: Jerome Dyson; Brad Miller; Wesley Johnson; Conditional Minnesota Timberwolves 1st Round Pick	To Minnesota Timberwolves: 2013 Brooklyn Nets 2nd Round Pick; 2014 Los Angeles Lakers 2nd Round Pick; 2016 Minnesota Timberwolves 2nd Round Pick	To New Orleans Pelicans: Robin Lopez; Hakim Warrick; Cash Considerations

=== Free agents ===
Player	Date Signed	Former Team
Eric Gordon	July 14	New Orleans Hornets
Roger Mason	August 4	Washington Wizards
