= 2012–13 Denver Nuggets season =

NBA professional basketball team season

- Head coach: George Karl
- Arena: Pepsi Center

Results
- Record: 57–25 (.695)
- Place: Division: 2nd (Northwest); Conference: 3rd (Western)
- Playoff finish: First Round (lost to Warriors 2–4)
- Stats at Basketball Reference

Local media
- Television: Altitude Sports and Entertainment
- Radio: KCKK

The 2012–13 Denver Nuggets season was the 46th season of the franchise, and its 37th season in the National Basketball Association (NBA). They finished the regular season with 57 wins and 25 losses, the franchise's best record since joining the NBA in 1976. The Nuggets, however, were unable to defeat the 6th seeded Golden State Warriors in a six-game first round series.

The team was able to acquire Andre Iguodala in the off-season. It was his only season in a Nuggets uniform before being sent to the Warriors at the end of the season.

Following the season, George Karl was fired as Nuggets head coach despite winning Coach of the Year.

The Nuggets would not make the playoffs again until 2019.

== Key dates ==
- June 28: The 2012 NBA draft took place at Prudential Center in Newark, New Jersey.
- November 25: Before their 102–84 win over the New Orleans Hornets, the team honored the participants of the 2012 Olympics who live in the Denver area.
- January 3: Andre Miller reached 15,000 career points.
- March 19: With a 114–104 win on the road over the Oklahoma City Thunder, the Denver Nuggets set a team record for consecutive wins with 13 in a row.
- March 25: Losing on the road 86–110 to the New Orleans Hornets, the Denver Nuggets ended a team record of 15 consecutive wins in a row.
- April 10: With their 96–86 home victory over the San Antonio Spurs, the Nuggets set a team record with 21 straight home wins and tie a record of 36 overall home wins and 54 total wins.
- April 14: With a 118–109 home win over the Portland Trail Blazers, the Nuggets set a franchise record with 55 total wins.
- May 2: The Nuggets were eliminated from the 2013 NBA Playoffs by the Golden State Warriors 4–2 with an 88–92 loss on the road.

== Draft ==
Round	Pick	Player	Position	Nationality	School/Club team
1	20	Evan Fournier	SG	France	Poitiers Basket 86
2	38	Quincy Miller ^{[1]}	PF	United States	Baylor University
2	50	İzzet Türkyılmaz	PF	Turkey	Banvit B.K.

- ^{1} Acquired from the Golden State Warriors.

== Roster ==
2012–13 Denver Nuggets roster
Players

Pos.	No.	Player	Height	Weight	DOB	From
PG	24	Andre Miller	6 ft 2 in (1.88 m)	200 lb (91 kg)	1976-03-19	Utah
PG	10	Julyan Stone	6 ft 6 in (1.98 m)	200 lb (91 kg)	1988-12-07	UTEP
SF	1	Jordan Hamilton	6 ft 7 in (2.01 m)	220 lb (100 kg)	1990-10-06	Texas
PG	3	Ty Lawson	5 ft 11 in (1.80 m)	195 lb (88 kg)	1987–11–03	North Carolina
C	34	JaVale McGee	7 ft 0 in (2.13 m)	237 lb (108 kg)	1988–01–19	Nevada
SF	13	Corey Brewer	6 ft 9 in (2.06 m)	185 lb (84 kg)	1986–03–05	Florida
SG	9	Andre Iguodala	6 ft 6 in (1.98 m)	207 lb (94 kg)	1984-01-28	Arizona
C	41	Kosta Koufos	7 ft 0 in (2.13 m)	265 lb (120 kg)	1989–02–24	Ohio State
PF	35	Kenneth Faried	6 ft 8 in (2.03 m)	228 lb (103 kg)	1989–18–11	Morehead State
PF	15	Anthony Randolph	6 ft 10 in (2.08 m)	205 lb (93 kg)	1989-07-15	LSU
PF	21	Wilson Chandler	6 ft 8 in (2.03 m)	220 lb (100 kg)	1987-05-10	DePaul
PF	30	Quincy Miller	6 ft 9 in (2.06 m)	210 lb (95 kg)	1992-11-18	Baylor
SG	94	Evan Fournier	6 ft 7 in (2.01 m)	205 lb (93 kg)	1992-10-29	France
SF	8	Danilo Gallinari	6 ft 10 in (2.08 m)	225 lb (102 kg)	1988–08–08	Italy
C	25	Timofey Mozgov	7 ft 1 in (2.16 m)	250 lb (113 kg)	1986–07–16	Russia

Coaches
Head coach
- George Karl
Assistant(s)
- Melvin Hunt
- John Welch
- Chad Iske

Legend
- (DP) Unsigned draft pick
- (FA) Free agent
- (S) Suspended
- Injured

== Pre-season ==
2012 pre-season game log
Pre-season: 3–4 (home: 1–1; road: 2–3)

Game	Date	Team	Score	High points	High rebounds	High assists	Location Attendance	Record
1	October 6	@ L. A. Clippers	W 106–104	Kenneth Faried (18)	Kosta Koufos (8)	Anthony Carter (8)	Mandalay Bay Events Center; 6,748	1–0
2	October 12	@ San Antonio	W 97–91	Corey Brewer (24)	Kosta Koufos (11)	Anthony Carter, Ty Lawson (4)	AT&T Center; 17,948	2–0
3	October 15	Golden State	W 104–98	Danilo Gallinari (18)	Kosta Koufos (13)	Andre Iguodala (7)	Pepsi Center; 11,621	3–0
4	October 17	@ Portland	L 80–97	Kenneth Faried (17)	Kenneth Faried (11)	Anthony Carter, Andre Miller (4)	Rose Garden; 17,856	3–1
5	October 21	@ Oklahoma City	L 101–108	Danilo Gallinari (26)	Andre Iguodala (10)	Ty Lawson (11)	Chesapeake Energy Arena; 18,203	3–2
6	October 25	L. A. Clippers	L 94–106	Corey Brewer (15)	Kenneth Faried, Kosta Koufos (10)	Andre Iguodala (7)	Pepsi Center; 13,406	3–3
7	October 26	@ Phoenix	L 72–88	Jordan Hamilton (15)	Jordan Hamilton (10)	Andre Miller (9)	US Airways Center; 11,976	3–4

2012–13 season schedule

== Regular season ==
=== Game log ===
2012–13 game log
Total: 57–25 (home: 38–3; road: 19–22)
October: 0–1 (home: 0–0; road: 0–1)

Game	Date	Team	Score	High points	High rebounds	High assists	Location Attendance	Record
1	October 31	@ Philadelphia	L 75–84	Ty Lawson (16)	Kosta Koufos (9)	Ty Lawson (7)	Wells Fargo Center; 19,101	0–1

November: 8–8 (home: 4–1; road: 4–7)

Game	Date	Team	Score	High points	High rebounds	High assists	Location Attendance	Record
2	November 2	@ Orlando	L 89–102	Danilo Gallinari (23)	Gallinari, Iguodala (8)	Ty Lawson (7)	Amway Center; 18,846	0–2
3	November 3	@ Miami	L 116–119	Faried & Iguodala (22)	Kenneth Faried (12)	Ty Lawson (6)	American Airlines Arena; 20,104	0–3
4	November 6	Detroit	W 109–97	Andre Iguodala (17)	Andre Iguodala (10)	Ty Lawson (9)	Pepsi Center; 19,155	1–3
5	November 7	@ Houston	W 93–87	Ty Lawson (21)	Kenneth Faried (16)	Ty Lawson (8)	Toyota Center; 13,372	2–3
6	November 9	Utah	W 104–84	Corey Brewer (20)	Faried & Koufos (10)	Lawson & Miller (7)	Pepsi Center; 15,523	3-3
7	November 10	@ Golden State	W 107–101	Danilo Gallinari (21)	Kenneth Faried (17)	Ty Lawson (10)	Oracle Arena; 19,596	4–3
8	November 12	@ Phoenix	L 100–110	Andre Iguodala (17)	Kenneth Faried (11)	Ty Lawson (8)	US Airways Center; 14,060	4-4
9	November 15	Miami	L 93–98	Andre Miller (19)	Kenneth Faried (20)	Ty Lawson (8)	Pepsi Center; 19,155	4–5
10	November 17	@ San Antonio	L 100–126	Danilo Gallinari (15)	JaVale McGee (8)	Ty Lawson (5)	AT&T Center; 18,581	4–6
11	November 19	@ Memphis	W 97–92	Danilo Gallinari (26)	Kenneth Faried (13)	Andre Miller (8)	FedExForum; 15,111	5–6
12	November 21	@ Minnesota	W 101–94	Danilo Gallinari (19)	Kenneth Faried (14)	Ty Lawson (9)	Target Center; 16,879	6-6
13	November 23	Golden State	W 102–91	Andre Iguodala (29)	Kenneth Faried (11)	Ty Lawson (9)	Pepsi Center; 18,523	7–6
14	November 25	New Orleans	W 102–84	Andre Iguodala (23)	Kenneth Faried (12)	Andre Miller (7)	Pepsi Center; 15,402	8–6
15	November 26	@ Utah	L 103–105	Kenneth Faried (21)	Faried & Koufos (9)	Ty Lawson (9)	EnergySolutions Arena; 18,776	8–7
16	November 29	@ Golden State	L 105–106	Andre Iguodala (22)	Danilo Gallinari (9)	Ty Lawson (9)	Oracle Arena; 17,627	8–8
17	November 30	@ L. A. Lakers	L 103–122	Danilo Gallinari (19)	Jordan Hamilton (8)	Ty Lawson (5)	Staples Center; 18,997	8–9

December: 9–6 (home: 5–0; road: 4–6)

Game	Date	Team	Score	High points	High rebounds	High assists	Location Attendance	Record
18	December 3	Toronto	W 113–110	Corey Brewer (19)	Faried & Koufos (10)	Andre Iguodala (8)	Pepsi Center; 15,221	9-9
19	December 5	@ Atlanta	L 104–108	Ty Lawson (32)	Timofey Mozgov (13)	Ty Lawson (7)	Philips Arena; 14,101	9–10
20	December 7	@ Indiana	W 92–89	Brewer & McGee (20)	JaVale McGee (8)	Gallinari & Miller (8)	Bankers Life Fieldhouse; 15,289	10-10
21	December 9	@ New York	L 106–112	Ty Lawson (23)	Danilo Gallinari (9)	Ty Lawson (6)	Madison Square Garden; 19,033	10–11
22	December 11	@ Detroit	W 101–94	Ty Lawson (26)	Andre Iguodala (8)	Lawson & Miller (7)	The Palace of Auburn Hills; 10,265	11-11
23	December 12	@ Minnesota	L 105–108	Kenneth Faried (26)	Kenneth Faried (14)	Ty Lawson (11)	Target Center; 16,444	11–12
24	December 14	Memphis	W 99–94	Andre Iguodala (20)	Kenneth Faried (10)	Andre Iguodala (7)	Pepsi Center; 16,367	12-12
25	December 16	@ Sacramento	W 122–97	JaVale McGee (19)	Faried & Iguodala (8)	Andre Iguodala (8)	Power Balance Pavilion; 13,327	13–12
26	December 18	San Antonio	W 112–106	Danilo Gallinari (28)	Kosta Koufos (14)	Andre Miller (7)	Pepsi Center; 17,092	14–12
27	December 20	@ Portland	L 93–101	Brewer, Iguodala, & Lawson (13)	Brewer, Koufos, & Miller (9)	Ty Lawson (8)	Rose Garden; 19,982	14–13
28	December 22	Charlotte	W 110–88	Kosta Koufos (16)	Kenneth Faried (9)	Iguodala & Miller (8)	Pepsi Center; 17,555	15–13
29	December 25	@ L. A. Clippers	L 100–112	Hamilton & Koufos (16)	Kosta Koufos (10)	Andre Miller (6)	Staples Center; 19,346	15–14
30	December 26	L. A. Lakers	W 126–114	Corey Brewer (27)	Kenneth Faried (15)	Ty Lawson (14)	Pepsi Center; 19,155	16–14
31	December 28	@ Dallas	W 106–85	Danilo Gallinari (39)	Kenneth Faried (19)	Andre Miller (9)	American Airlines Center; 20,439	17–14
32	December 29	@ Memphis	L 72–81	Brewer, Iguodala, & McGee (12)	JaVale McGee (9)	Andre Iguodala (5)	FedExForum; 17,707	17–15

January: 11–3 (home: 9–2; road: 2–1)

Game	Date	Team	Score	High points	High rebounds	High assists	Location Attendance	Record
33	January 1	L. A. Clippers	W 92–78	Danilo Gallinari (17)	Kenneth Faried (11)	Andre Miller (12)	Pepsi Center; 19,155	18–15
34	January 3	Minnesota	L 97–101	Koufos & Lawson (16)	Iguodala & Koufos (7)	Andre Miller (10)	Pepsi Center; 16,921	18–16
35	January 5	Utah	W 110–91	Danilo Gallinari (26)	Kosta Koufos (13)	Andre Miller (6)	Pepsi Center; 19,155	19–16
36	January 6	@ L. A. Lakers	W 112–105	Ty Lawson (21)	Kosta Koufos (7)	Lawson & Miller (10)	Staples Center; 18,997	20–16
37	January 9	Orlando	W 108–105	Faried & Lawson (19)	Kenneth Faried (19)	Ty Lawson (8)	Pepsi Center; 15,084	21–16
38	January 11	Cleveland	W 98–91	Danilo Gallinari (23)	Faried & Iguodala (11)	Ty Lawson (8)	Pepsi Center; 16,445	22–16
39	January 13	Golden State	W 116–105	Danilo Gallinari (21)	Kenneth Faried (10)	Andre Miller (8)	Pepsi Center; 15,861	23–16
40	January 15	Portland	W 115–111	Danilo Gallinari (25)	Kenneth Faried (11)	Ty Lawson (12)	Pepsi Center; 15,521	24–16
41	January 16	@ Oklahoma City	L 97–117	Kosta Koufos (16)	Kosta Koufos (9)	Andre Miller (10)	Chesapeake Energy Arena; 18,203	24–17
42	January 18	Washington	L 108–112	Ty Lawson (29)	Kosta Koufos (7)	Ty Lawson (6)	Pepsi Center; 16,523	24–18
43	January 20	Oklahoma City	W 121–118	Corey Brewer (26)	Kosta Koufos (11)	Ty Lawson (9)	Pepsi Center; 19155	25–18
44	January 23	@ Houston	W 105–95	Ty Lawson (21)	Chandler, Faried, Gallinari, Iguodala & Koufos (6)	Ty Lawson (7)	Toyota Center; 16,867	26–18
45	January 26	Sacramento	W 121–93	Ty Lawson (26)	Kenneth Faried (9)	Andre Miller (9)	Pepsi Center; 17,651	27–18
46	January 28	Indiana	W 102–101	Danilo Gallinari (27)	Kosta Koufos (11)	Lawson & Iguodala (7)	Pepsi Center; 16,032	28–18
47	January 30	Houston	W 118–110	Danilo Gallinari (27)	Kenneth Faried (9)	Andre Iguodala (6)	Pepsi Center; 17,399	29–18

February: 8–4 (home: 5–0; road: 3–4)

Game	Date	Team	Score	High points	High rebounds	High assists	Location Attendance	Record
48	February 1	New Orleans	W 113–98	Andre Iguodala (24)	Kenneth Faried (9)	Ty Lawson (13)	Pepsi Center; 17,221	30–18
49	February 5	Milwaukee	W 112–104	Gallinari & Lawson (22)	Chandler & Faried (10)	Andre Miller (9)	Pepsi Center; 15,272	31–18
50	February 7	Chicago	W 128–96	Wilson Chandler (24)	Kenneth Faried (12)	Ty Lawson (12)	Pepsi Center; 19,325	32–18
51	February 9	@ Cleveland	W 111–103	Danilo Gallinari (19)	Gallinari & Koufos (9)	Andre Iguodala (7)	Quicken Loans Arena; 20,562	33–18
52	February 10	@ Boston	L 114–118 (3OT)	Ty Lawson (29)	Kenneth Faried (12)	Ty Lawson (9)	TD Garden; 18,624	33–19
53	February 12	@ Toronto	L 108–109	Ty Lawson (29)	Kenneth Faried (11)	Ty Lawson (9)	Air Canada Centre; 16,738	33–20
54	February 13	@ Brooklyn	L 108–119	Ty Lawson (26)	Chandler & Koufos (7)	Andre Miller (10)	Barclays Center; 17,251	33–21
All-Star Break
55	February 19	Boston	W 97–90	Gallinari & Lawson (26)	Kenneth Faried (16)	Andre Iguodala (7)	Pepsi Center; 19,155	34–21
56	February 22	@ Washington	L 113–119	Ty Lawson (27)	Kosta Koufos (7)	Ty Lawson (12)	Verizon Center; 16,527	34–22
57	February 23	@ Charlotte	W 113–99	Ty Lawson (20)	Kosta Koufos (6)	Andre Iguodala (10)	Time Warner Cable Arena; 18,481	35–22
58	February 25	L. A. Lakers	W 119–108	Wilson Chandler (23)	Kenneth Faried (10)	Andre Iguodala (12)	Pepsi Center; 19,155	36–22
59	February 27	@ Portland	W 111–109	Ty Lawson (30)	Kenneth Faried (8)	Andre Miller (10)	Rose Garden; 20,077	37–22

March: 13–2 (home: 9–0; road: 4–2)

Game	Date	Team	Score	High points	High rebounds	High assists	Location Attendance	Record
60	March 1	Oklahoma City	W 105–103	Wilson Chandler (35)	Kosta Koufos (13)	Lawson and Miller (7)	Pepsi Center; 19,521	38–22
61	March 4	Atlanta	W 104–88	Corey Brewer (22)	Kenneth Faried (13)	Andre Miller (9)	Pepsi Center; 17,554	39–22
62	March 5	@ Sacramento	W 120–113	Ty Lawson (24)	Kenneth Faried (12)	Andre Iguodala (7)	Power Balance Pavilion; 11,923	40–22
63	March 7	L. A. Clippers	W 107–92	Ty Lawson (21)	Kenneth Faried (10)	Ty Lawson (11)	Pepsi Center; 18,857	41–22
64	March 9	Minnesota	W 111–88	Ty Lawson (32)	Kenneth Faried (11)	Danilo Gallinari (6)	Pepsi Center; 18,823	42–22
65	March 11	@ Phoenix	W 108–93	Kosta Koufos (22)	Kosta Koufos (10)	Andre Iguodala (7)	US Airways Center; 15,597	43–22
66	March 13	New York	W 117–94	Wilson Chandler (24)	Kenneth Faried (10)	Ty Lawson (7)	Pepsi Center; 19,155	44–22
67	March 15	Memphis	W 87–80	Kosta Koufos (18)	Kosta Koufos (16)	Andre Iguodala (7)	Pepsi Center; 19,408	45–22
68	March 18	@ Chicago	W 119–118 (OT)	Wilson Chandler (35)	Andre Iguodala (10)	Wilson Chandler (4)	United Center; 22,138	46–22
69	March 19	@ Oklahoma City	W 114–104	Ty Lawson (25)	Kenneth Faried (15)	Andre Miller (9)	Chesapeake Energy Arena; 18,203	47–22
70	March 21	Philadelphia	W 101–100	Corey Brewer (29)	Kosta Koufos (8)	Andre Miller (8)	Pepsi Center; 19,155	48–22
71	March 23	Sacramento	W 101–95	Danilo Gallinari (19)	Kenneth Faried (9)	Andre Iguodala (8)	Pepsi Center; 19,155	49–22
72	March 25	@ New Orleans	L 86–110	Danilo Gallinari (24)	Kenneth Faried (7)	Andre Miller (6)	New Orleans Arena; 11,185	49–23
73	March 27	@ San Antonio	L 99–100	JaVale McGee (21)	JaVale McGee (11)	Andre Miller (8)	AT&T Center; 18,581	49–24
74	March 29	Brooklyn	W 109–87	Evan Fournier (19)	Kosta Koufos (9)	Andre Iguodala (8)	Pepsi Center; 19,155	50–24

April: 7–1 (home: 5–0; road: 2–1)

Game	Date	Team	Score	High points	High rebounds	High assists	Location Attendance	Record
75	April 3	@ Utah	W 113–96	Danilo Gallinari (21)	Kosta Koufos (13)	Andre Iguodala (6)	EnergySolutions Arena; 17,654	51–24
76	April 4	Dallas	W 95–94	Corey Brewer (23)	Kenneth Faried (19)	Andre Iguodala (8)	Pepsi Center; 19,155	52–24
77	April 6	Houston	W 132–114	Corey Brewer (22)	Koufos & Iguodala & Randolph (7)	Andre Iguodala (14)	Pepsi Center; 19,155	53–24
78	April 10	San Antonio	W 96–86	Wilson Chandler (29)	Andre Iguodala (13)	Andre Iguodala (10)	Pepsi Center; 16,651	54–24
79	April 12	@ Dallas	L 105–108 (OT)	Chandler, Iguodala & Brewer (18)	Kenneth Faried (10)	Andre Miller (8)	American Airlines Center; 20,368	54–25
80	April 14	Portland	W 118–109	Andre Iguodala (28)	Andre Iguodala (7)	Ty Lawson (10)	Pepsi Center; 19,155	55–25
81	April 15	@ Milwaukee	W 112–111	Ty Lawson (26)	JaVale McGee (17)	Lawson & Iguodala (7)	BMO Harris Bradley Center; 16,517	56–25
82	April 17	Phoenix	W 118–98	Wilson Chandler (21)	Anthony Randolph (14)	Ty Lawson (7)	Pepsi Center; 17,539	57–25

2012–13 season schedule

=== Standings ===
Northwest Division	W	L	PCT	GB	Home	Road	Div	GP
c-Oklahoma City Thunder	60	22	.732	–	34–7	26–15	10–6	82
x-Denver Nuggets	57	25	.695	3	38–3	19–22	11–5	82
Utah Jazz	43	39	.524	17	30–11	13–28	9–7	82
Portland Trail Blazers	33	49	.402	27	22–19	11–30	6–10	82
Minnesota Timberwolves	31	51	.378	29	20–21	11–30	4–12	82

Western Conference
#	Team	W	L	PCT	GB	GP
1	c-Oklahoma City Thunder *	60	22	.732	–	82
2	y-San Antonio Spurs *	58	24	.707	2.0	82
3	x-Denver Nuggets *	57	25	.695	3.0	82
4	y-Los Angeles Clippers	56	26	.683	4.0	82
5	x-Memphis Grizzlies	56	26	.683	4.0	82
6	x-Golden State Warriors	47	35	.573	13.0	82
7	x-Los Angeles Lakers	45	37	.549	15.0	82
8	x-Houston Rockets	45	37	.549	15.0	82
9	Utah Jazz	43	39	.524	17.0	82
10	Dallas Mavericks	41	41	.500	19.0	82
11	Portland Trail Blazers	33	49	.402	27.0	82
12	Minnesota Timberwolves	31	51	.378	29.0	82
13	Sacramento Kings	28	54	.341	32.0	82
14	New Orleans Hornets	27	55	.329	33.0	82
15	Phoenix Suns	25	57	.305	35.0	82

== Playoffs ==
2013 playoff game log
First Round: 2–4 (home: 2–1; road: 0–3)

Game	Date	Team	Score	High points	High rebounds	High assists	Location Attendance	Series
1	April 20	Golden State	W 97–95	Andre Miller (28)	Wilson Chandler (13)	Andre Iguodala (8)	Pepsi Center; 19,155	1–0
2	April 23	Golden State	L 117–131	Corey Brewer; Ty Lawson (19)	Wilson Chandler (6)	Ty Lawson (12)	Pepsi Center; 19,155	1–1
3	April 26	@ Golden State	L 108–110	Ty Lawson (35)	Wilson Chandler (9)	Ty Lawson (10)	Oracle Arena; 19,596	1–2
4	April 28	@ Golden State	L 101–115	Ty Lawson (26)	Kenneth Faried (12)	Ty Lawson (6)	Oracle Arena; 19,596	1–3
5	April 30	Golden State	W 107–100	Andre Iguodala (25)	Andre Iguodala (12)	Ty Lawson (10)	Pepsi Center; 19,155	2–3
6	May 2	@ Golden State	L 88–92	Andre Iguodala (24)	Kenneth Faried (11)	Andre Iguodala; Ty Lawson (6)	Oracle Arena	2–4

2013 playoff schedule

== Player statistics ==
Legend
GP	Games played	GS	Games started	MPG	Minutes per game
FG%	Field-goal percentage	3P%	3-point field-goal percentage	FT%	Free-throw percentage
RPG	Rebounds per game	APG	Assists per game	SPG	Steals per game
BPG	Blocks per game	PPG	Points per game

=== Regular season ===
Player	GP	GS	MPG	FG%	3P%	FT%	RPG	APG	SPG	BPG	PPG
Corey Brewer	82	2	24.4	.425	.296	.690	2.9	1.5	1.44	.28	12.1
Wilson Chandler	43	8	25.1	.462	.413	.793	5.1	1.3	1.05	.28	13.0
Kenneth Faried	80	80	28.1	.552	.000	.613	9.2	1.0	1.01	1.04	11.5
Evan Fournier	38	4	11.3	.493	.407	.769	.9	1.2	.5	.03	5.3
Danilo Gallinari	71	71	32.5	.418	.373	.822	5.2	2.5	.9	.51	16.2
Jordan Hamilton	40	1	9.9	.418	.370	.500	2.4	.6	.38	.2	5.2
Andre Iguodala	80	80	34.7	.451	.317	.574	5.3	5.4	1.74	.65	13.0
Kosta Koufos	81	81	22.4	.581	.000	.558	6.9	.4	.54	1.27	8.0
Ty Lawson	73	71	34.4	.461	.366	.756	2.7	6.9	1.47	.11	16.7
JaVale McGee	79	0	18.1	.575	1.000	.591	4.8	.3	.38	1.99	9.1
Andre Miller	82	11	26.2	.479	.266	.840	2.9	5.9	.89	.13	9.6
Quincy Miller	7	0	3.7	.333	.000	.500	.3	.4	.14	.00	1.3
Timofey Mozgov	41	1	8.9	.506	.000	.769	2.6	.2	.15	.44	2.6
Anthony Randolph	39	0	8.4	.491	.000	.689	2.4	.3	.49	.54	3.7
Julyan Stone	4	0	7.0	1.000	.000	.750	.8	.5	.25	.00	1.8

^{a} Statistics with the Denver Nuggets.

=== Playoffs ===
Player	GP	GS	MPG	FG%	3P%	FT%	RPG	APG	SPG	BPG	PPG
Corey Brewer	6	0	24.3	.309	.250	.670	1.8	1.2	1.00	.17	10.8
Wilson Chandler	6	6	34.2	.355	.310	.750	5.5	1.3	1.33	.50	12.0
Kenneth Faried	5	4	29.0	.625	.000	.730	8.4	0.2	1.00	.20	10.2
Evan Fournier	4	4	13.3	.353	.000	.880	.00	1.0	.5	.00	4.8
Jordan Hamilton	1	0	2.0	.000	.000	.000	.00	.00	.00	.00	0.0
Andre Iguodala	6	6	40.5	.500	.483	.720	8.0	5.3	2.00	.33	18.0
Kosta Koufos	6	2	16.7	.368	1.000	.830	3.5	.5	.50	.67	3.3
Ty Lawson	6	6	39.3	.440	.190	.850	3.3	8.0	1.67	.00	21.3
JaVale McGee	6	2	18.7	.581	.000	.390	5.2	.00	.67	1.00	7.2
Andre Miller	6	0	25.7	.420	.455	.780	3.3	3.8	.33	.00	14.0
Anthony Randolph	5	0	6.0	.818	.000	.730	1.2	.00	.40	.00	5.2
Julyan Stone	2	0	6.5	.000	.000	1.000	.00	.5	.00	.00	1.0

== Transactions ==
=== Overview ===
Players Added

Via draft

- Evan Fournier
- Quincy Miller

Via free agency

- Anthony Carter ^{[a]}
- Anthony Randolph
- Ben Uzoh ^{[a]}

Via trade

- Andre Iguodala
Players Lost

Via trade

- Arron Afflalo
- Al Harrington

Via free agency

- Rudy Fernández

Waived

- Chris Andersen

- ^{[a]} Cut from the roster during training camp.

=== Trades ===
August 10, 2012 (4-team trade)	To Denver Nuggets Andre Iguodala	To Orlando Magic Arron Afflalo; Al Harrington; 2013 second-round pick 2014 first-round pick (from Denver or New York)

=== Free agents ===
Additions
Player	Date signed	Former team
Andre Miller	July 11	Denver Nuggets (re-signed)
JaVale McGee	July 18	Denver Nuggets (re-signed)
Anthony Randolph	July 20	Minnesota Timberwolves
Anthony Carter	October 1	Toronto Raptors
Ben Uzoh	October 1	Toronto Raptors

Subtractions
Player	Date left	New team
Rudy Fernández	July 4	Real Madrid (Spain)
