= 2012–13 Sacramento Kings season =

NBA professional basketball team season

- Head coach: Keith Smart
- General manager: Geoff Petrie
- Owners: Maloof family
- Arena: Sleep Train Arena

Results
- Record: 28–54 (.341)
- Place: Division: 4th (Pacific); Conference: 13th (Western)
- Playoff finish: Did not qualify
- Stats at Basketball Reference

Local media
- Television: Comcast Sports Net California
- Radio: Sports Radio 1140 The Fan

The 2012–13 Sacramento Kings season was the 68th season of the franchise, and the 64th season in the National Basketball Association (NBA), and its 28th in Sacramento.

== Key dates ==
- June 28: The 2012 NBA draft took place at Prudential Center in Newark, New Jersey.

== Draft picks ==
Round	Pick	Player	Position	Nationality	College
1	5	Thomas Robinson	Forward	United States	Kansas
2	36	Orlando Johnson	Guard	United States	UC Santa Barbara

== Roster ==
2012–13 Sacramento Kings roster
Players

Pos.	No.	Player	Height	Weight	DOB	From
C	45	Cole Aldrich	6 ft 11 in (2.11 m)	245 lb (111 kg)	1988-10-31	Kansas
C	15	DeMarcus Cousins	6 ft 11 in (2.11 m)	270 lb (122 kg)	1990–08–13	Kentucky
G	0	Toney Douglas	6 ft 2 in (1.88 m)	185 lb (84 kg)	1986-03-16	Florida State
G/F	13	Tyreke Evans	6 ft 6 in (1.98 m)	220 lb (100 kg)	1989–09–19	Memphis
G	7	Jimmer Fredette	6 ft 2 in (1.88 m)	195 lb (88 kg)	1989–02–25	BYU
F/C	42	Chuck Hayes	6 ft 6 in (1.98 m)	250 lb (113 kg)	1983–06–11	Kentucky
F	52	James Johnson	6 ft 9 in (2.06 m)	248 lb (112 kg)	1987–02–20	Wake Forest
F	25	Travis Outlaw	6 ft 9 in (2.06 m)	207 lb (94 kg)	1984–09–18	Starkville HS (MS)
PF/C	9	Patrick Patterson	6 ft 9 in (2.06 m)	235 lb (107 kg)	1989-03-14	Kentucky
G/F	5	John Salmons	6 ft 6 in (1.98 m)	207 lb (94 kg)	1979–12–12	Miami (FL)
G	22	Isaiah Thomas	5 ft 9 in (1.75 m)	185 lb (84 kg)	1989–02–07	Washington
F/C	34	Jason Thompson	6 ft 11 in (2.11 m)	250 lb (113 kg)	1986–07–21	Rider
G	23	Marcus Thornton	6 ft 4 in (1.93 m)	205 lb (93 kg)	1987–06–05	LSU

Coaches
Head coach
- Keith Smart
Assistant(s)
- Jim Eyen
- Alex English
- Clifford Ray
- Bobby Jackson

Legend
- (DP) Unsigned draft pick
- (FA) Free agent
- (S) Suspended
- (DL) On assignment to D-League affiliate
- Injured

Roster
Updated: 2013–01–12

== Pre-season ==
2012 pre-season game log
Pre-season: 5–2 (home: 2–1; road: 3–1)

Game	Date	Team	Score	High points	High rebounds	High assists	Location Attendance	Record
1	October 10	Phoenix	W 102–96	DeMarcus Cousins (21)	DeMarcus Cousins (9)	Four players (4)	Power Balance Pavilion; 9,633	1–0
2	October 15	Portland	W 117–100	Marcus Thornton (23)	DeMarcus Cousins, Chuck Hayes (7)	Chuck Hayes, Isaiah Thomas (4)	Power Balance Pavilion; 9,328	2–0
3	October 17	Golden State	L 88–98	Isaiah Thomas (13)	DeMarcus Cousins (9)	Three players (2)	Power Balance Pavilion; 10,708	2–1
4	October 19	@ L. A. Lakers	W 103–98	Marcus Thornton (19)	DeMarcus Cousins (10)	Isaiah Thomas (10)	Thomas & Mack Center; 17,792	3–1
5	October 21	@ L. A. Lakers	W 99–92	Aaron Brooks, DeMarcus Cousins (16)	Chuck Hayes (7)	James Johnson (3)	Staples Center; 18,997	4–1
6	October 22	@ Phoenix	L 88–103	Thomas Robinson (17)	Thomas Robinson (8)	Aaron Brooks, Isaiah Thomas (4)	US Airways Center; 9,071	4–2
6	October 25	@ L. A. Lakers	W 94–82	DeMarcus Cousins, Isaiah Thomas (20)	DeMarcus Cousins (13)	Tyreke Evans (5)	Valley View Casino Center; 11,200	5–2

2012–13 season schedule

== Regular season ==
=== Game log ===
2012–13 game log
Total: 28–54 (Home: 20–21; Road: 8–33)
October: 0–1 (home: 0–0; road: 0–1)

Game	Date	Team	Score	High points	High rebounds	High assists	Location Attendance	Record
1	October 31	@ Chicago	L 87–93	Tyreke Evans (21)	Evans & Thompson (8)	Evans & Hayes (3)	United Center; 21,313	0–1

November : 4–10 (home: 4–6; road: 0–4)

Game	Date	Team	Score	High points	High rebounds	High assists	Location Attendance	Record
2	November 2	@ Minnesota	L 80–92	Isaiah Thomas (20)	Chuck Hayes (11)	Tyreke Evans (4)	Target Center; 19,356	0–2
3	November 3	@ Indiana	L 98–106	Marcus Thornton (26)	DeMarcus Cousins (13)	Evans, Thornton and Hayes (4)	Bankers Life Fieldhouse; 18,165	0–3
4	November 5	Golden State	W 94–92	DeMarcus Cousins (23)	DeMarcus Cousins (15)	Marcus Thornton (3)	Sleep Train Arena; 17,317	1–3
5	November 7	Detroit	W 105–103	DeMarcus Cousins (21)	DeMarcus Cousins (11)	Aaron Brooks (4)	Sleep Train Arena; 10,185	2–3
6	November 9	San Antonio	L 86–97	Thompson and Thornton (17)	DeMarcus Cousins (9)	Cousins, Evans, Thornton and Hayes (3)	Sleep Train Arena; 13,505	2–4
7	November 11	@ L. A. Lakers	L 90–103	Jimmer Fredette (18)	Jason Thompson (10)	Tyreke Evans (4)	Staples Center; 18,997	2–5
8	November 13	Portland	L 86–103	James Johnson (16)	Jason Thompson (11)	Fredette & Hayes (6)	Sleep Train Arena; 10,153	2–6
9	November 16	Atlanta	L 96–112	Jason Thompson (19)	DeMarcus Cousins (16)	DeMarcus Cousins (7)	Sleep Train Arena; 11,814	2–7
10	November 18	Brooklyn	L 90–99	DeMarcus Cousins (29)	Jason Thompson (8)	Isaiah Thomas (4)	Sleep Train Arena; 11,965	2–8
11	November 21	L. A. Lakers	W 113–97	Marcus Thornton (23)	Jason Thompson (10)	Tyreke Evans (6)	Sleep Train Arena; 15,249	3–8
12	November 23	@ Utah	L 102–104	Tyreke Evans (19)	DeMarcus Cousins (7)	Tyreke Evans (5)	EnergySolutions Arena; 18,000	3–9
13	November 24	Utah	W 108–97	Tyreke Evans (27)	Cousins & Thompson (9)	Tyreke Evans (5)	Sleep Train Arena; 12,239	4–9
14	November 27	Minnesota	L 89–97	Evans & Cousins (20)	Tyreke Evans (7)	Tyreke Evans (6)	Sleep Train Arena; 10,741	4–10
15	November 30	Indiana	L 92–97	DeMarcus Cousins (19)	DeMarcus Cousins (16)	Salmons, Fredette & Hayes (3)	Sleep Train Arena; 12,544	4–11

December : 7–8 (home: 6–1; road: 1–7)

Game	Date	Team	Score	High points	High rebounds	High assists	Location Attendance	Record
16	December 1	@ L. A. Clippers	L 81–116	Marcus Thornton (20)	Jason Thompson (12)	Salmons, Thompson & Hayes (4)	Staples Center; 19,060	4–12
17	December 5	Toronto	W 107–100	DeMarcus Cousins (25)	DeMarcus Cousins (13)	John Salmons (7)	Sleep Train Arena; 12,476	5–12
18	December 7	Orlando	W 91–82	Cousins & Thomas (17)	DeMarcus Cousins (14)	Cousins & Thomas (4)	Sleep Train Arena; 16,305	6–12
19	December 8	@ Portland	W 99–80	Salmons & Cousins (19)	DeMarcus Cousins (12)	John Salmons (11)	Rose Garden; 19,454	7–12
20	December 10	@ Dallas	L 96–119	Cousins & García (25)	Jason Thompson (12)	John Salmons (7)	American Airlines Center; 19,737	7–13
21	December 12	@ Milwaukee Bucks	L 85–98	Tyreke Evans (17)	Jason Thompson (15)	Aaron Brooks (6)	BMO Harris Bradley Center; 11,491	7–14
22	December 14	@ Oklahoma City	L 103–113	Isaiah Thomas (26)	DeMarcus Cousins (7)	Jason Thompson (4)	Chesapeake Energy Arena; 18,203	7–15
23	December 16	Denver	L 97–122	Isaiah Thomas (20)	DeMarcus Cousins (11)	Isaiah Thomas (4)	Sleep Train Arena; 13,327	7–16
24	December 17	@ Phoenix	L 90–101	Jimmer Fredette (22)	DeMarcus Cousins (10)	Brooks, Thomas & Hayes (3)	US Airways Center; 13,068	7–17
25	December 19	Golden State	W 131–127	DeMarcus Cousins (24)	Jason Thompson (15)	Salmons, Cousins & Brooks (5)	Sleep Train Arena; 12,885	8–17
26	December 21	@ L. A. Clippers	L 85–97	Jimmer Fredette (16)	Jason Thompson (8)	John Salmons (4)	Staples Center; 19,060	8–18
27	December 23	Portland	W 108–96	Marcus Thornton (22)	John Salmons (7)	John Salmons (7)	Sleep Train Arena; 13,244	9–18
28	December 26	@ Portland	L 91–109	John Salmons (19)	Chuck Hayes (9)	Isaiah Thomas (6)	Rose Garden; 20,545	9–19
29	December 28	New York	W 106–105	Marcus Thornton (18)	DeMarcus Cousins (10)	DeMarcus Cousins (5)	Sleep Train Arena; 16,407	10–19
30	December 30	Boston	W 118–96	Isaiah Thomas (27)	DeMarcus Cousins (10)	DeMarcus Cousins (10)	Sleep Train Arena; 15,305	11–19

January : 6–11 (home: 2–5; road: 4–6)

Game	Date	Team	Score	High points	High rebounds	High assists	Location Attendance	Record
31	January 1	@ Detroit	L 97–103	DeMarcus Cousins (21)	DeMarcus Cousins (14)	John Salmons (6)	The Palace of Auburn Hills; 12,175	11–20
32	January 2	@ Cleveland	W 97–94	Jason Thompson (19)	DeMarcus Cousins (16)	DeMarcus Cousins (6)	Quicken Loans Arena; 12,331	12–20
33	January 4	@ Toronto	W 105–96	DeMarcus Cousins (31)	DeMarcus Cousins (20)	Isaiah Thomas (6)	Air Canada Centre; 17,824	13–20
34	January 5	@ Brooklyn	L 93–113	DeMarcus Cousins (28)	DeMarcus Cousins (11)	Aaron Brooks (4)	Barclays Center; 17,732	13–21
35	January 7	Memphis	L 81–113	John Salmons (17)	Thomas Robinson (12)	Isaiah Thomas (4)	Sleep Train Arena; 11,531	13–22
36	January 10	Dallas	L 112–117	DeMarcus Cousins (29)	Thomas Robinson (10)	Salmons, Cousins & Thomas (4)	Sleep Train Arena; 14,011	13–23
37	January 12	Miami	L 99–128	Isaiah Thomas (34)	Thomas Robinson (10)	Isaiah Thomas (5)	Sleep Train Arena; 14,367	13–24
38	January 14	Cleveland	W 124–118	DeMarcus Cousins (26)	DeMarcus Cousins (14)	Cousins & Thomas (6)	Sleep Train Arena; 12,194	14–24
39	January 16	Washington	W 95–94	Cousins, Evans & Salmons (21)	DeMarcus Cousins (16)	Tyreke Evans (8)	Sleep Train Arena; 11,611	15–24
40	January 18	@ Memphis	L 69–85	DeMarcus Cousins (22)	DeMarcus Cousins (12)	Isaiah Thomas (5)	FedExForum; 15,910	15–25
41	January 19	@ Charlotte	W 97–93	Marcus Thornton (17)	DeMarcus Cousins (10)	Isaiah Thomas (7)	Time Warner Cable Arena; 17,012	16–25
42	January 21	@ New Orleans	L 105–114	DeMarcus Cousins (29)	DeMarcus Cousins (13)	Evans & Salmons (4)	New Orleans Arena; 10,880	16–26
43	January 23	Phoenix	L 96–106	Tyreke Evans (16)	DeMarcus Cousins (15)	Isaiah Thomas (7)	Sleep Train Arena; 12,741	16–27
44	January 25	Oklahoma City	L 95–105	Tyreke Evans (16)	Cousins & Salmons (8)	James Johnson (4)	Sleep Train Arena; 15,022	16–28
45	January 26	@ Denver	L 93–121	Aaron Brooks (16)	Thomas Robinson (10)	DeMarcus Cousins (4)	Pepsi Center; 17,651	16–29
46	January 28	@ Washington	W 96–94	Isaiah Thomas (22)	Evans, Hayes & Thompson (5)	Isaiah Thomas (7)	Verizon Center; 13,422	17–29
47	January 30	@ Boston	L 81–99	Tyreke Evans (19)	Tyreke Evans (11)	DeMarcus Cousins (4)	TD Garden; 18,624	17–30

February : 3–9 (home: 2–1; road: 1–8)

Game	Date	Team	Score	High points	High rebounds	High assists	Location Attendance	Record
48	February 1	@ Philadelphia	L 80–89	Tyreke Evans (29)	DeMarcus Cousins (12)	Isaiah Thomas (5)	Wells Fargo Center; 17,927	17–31
49	February 2	@ New York	L 81–120	DeMarcus Cousins (25)	DeMarcus Cousins (9)	Isaiah Thomas (6)	Madison Square Garden; 19,033	17–32
50	February 4	@ Utah	L 91–98	Jason Thompson (23)	Jason Thompson (10)	Evans & Thomas (3)	EnergySolutions Arena; 17,742	17–33
51	February 9	Utah	W 120–109	Isaiah Thomas (25)	DeMarcus Cousins (11)	Cousins & Evans (25)	Sleep Train Arena; 16,193	18–33
52	February 10	Houston	W 117–111	Salmons & Thomas (23)	Chuck Hayes (12)	Salmons & Thomas (6)	Sleep Train Arena; 15,526	19–33
53	February 12	@ Memphis	L 101–108	DeMarcus Cousins (23)	Cousins & Evans (7)	Cousins & Brooks (4)	FedExForum; 14,722	19–34
54	February 13	@ Dallas	L 100–123	Tyreke Evans (23)	DeMarcus Cousins (13)	James Johnson (4)	American Airlines Center; 19,892	19–35
All-Star Break
55	February 19	San Antonio	L 102–108	Isaiah Thomas (22)	Cousins & Thompson (8)	Cousins & Thomas (4)	Sleep Train Arena; 14,940	19–36
56	February 22	@ Atlanta	L 108–122	Isaiah Thomas (30)	DeMarcus Cousins (13)	Isaiah Thomas (9)	Philips Arena; 15,031	19–37
57	February 24	@ New Orleans	L 95–110	John Salmons (18)	DeMarcus Cousins (10)	Isaiah Thomas (5)	New Orleans Arena; 12,788	19–38
58	February 26	@ Miami	L 129–141 (2OT)	Marcus Thornton (36)	DeMarcus Cousins (15)	Isaiah Thomas (9)	American Airlines Arena; 19,734	19–39
59	February 27	@ Orlando	W 125–101	John Salmons (21)	Marcus Thornton (8)	Tyreke Evans (7)	Amway Center; 16,722	20–39

March : 7–8 (home: 5–4; road: 2–4)

Game	Date	Team	Score	High points	High rebounds	High assists	Location Attendance	Record
60	March 1	@ San Antonio	L 102–130	Marcus Thornton (25)	DeMarcus Cousins (7)	Marcus Thornton (5)	AT&T Center; 18,581	20–40
61	March 3	Charlotte	W 119–83	John Salmons (22)	Jason Thompson (14)	Isaiah Thomas (7)	Sleep Train Arena; 14,555	21–40
62	March 5	Denver	L 113–120	Marcus Thornton (32)	DeMarcus Cousins (13)	Isaiah Thomas (8)	Sleep Train Arena; 11,923	21–41
63	March 6	@ Golden State	L 83–87	Jason Thompson (17)	Jason Thompson (8)	Tyreke Evans (6)	Oracle Arena; 19,596	21–42
64	March 8	Phoenix	W 121–112	Isaiah Thomas (27)	DeMarcus Cousins (14)	DeMarcus Cousins (7)	Sleep Train Arena; 13,501	22–42
65	March 10	Milwaukee	L 113–115	DeMarcus Cousins (24)	DeMarcus Cousins (10)	Isaiah Thomas (9)	Sleep Train Arena; 14,761	22–43
66	March 13	Chicago	W 121–79	Tyreke Evans (26)	Patrick Patterson (9)	Tyreke Evans (7)	Sleep Train Arena; 14,426	23–43
67	March 17	@ L. A. Lakers	L 102–113	Isaiah Thomas (26)	Thompson & Hayes (7)	Tyreke Evans (7)	Staples Center; 18,997	23–44
68	March 19	L. A. Clippers	W 116–101	Marcus Thornton (25)	DeMarcus Cousins (11)	Toney Douglas (7)	Sleep Train Arena; 13,563	24–44
69	March 21	Minnesota	W 101–98	Isaiah Thomas (24)	DeMarcus Cousins (14)	Isaiah Thomas (6)	Sleep Train Arena; 12,176	25–44
70	March 23	@ Denver	L 95–101	DeMarcus Cousins (24)	DeMarcus Cousins (15)	Isaiah Thomas (9)	Pepsi Center; 19,155	25–45
71	March 24	Philadelphia	L 103–117	Isaiah Thomas (25)	DeMarcus Cousins (9)	Tyreke Evans (8)	Sleep Train Arena; 14,647	25–46
72	March 27	@ Golden State	W 105–98	Isaiah Thomas (31)	Patterson & Thompson (9)	Isaiah Thomas (7)	Oracle Arena; 19,596	26–46
73	March 28	@ Phoenix	W 117–103	DeMarcus Cousins (34)	DeMarcus Cousins (14)	Isaiah Thomas (8)	US Airways Center; 15,086	27–46
74	March 30	L. A. Lakers	L 98–103	Tyreke Evans (21)	DeMarcus Cousins (11)	Tyreke Evans (6)	Sleep Train Arena; 17,317	27–47

April: 1–7 (home: 1–4; road: 0–3)

Game	Date	Team	Score	High points	High rebounds	High assists	Location Attendance	Record
75	April 3	Houston	L 102–112	Tyreke Evans (22)	Jason Thompson (15)	John Salmons (5)	Sleep Train Arena; 12,377	27–48
76	April 5	Dallas	L 108–117	Isaiah Thomas (29)	Jason Thompson (16)	Tyreke Evans (6)	Sleep Train Arena; 13,903	27–49
77	April 7	Memphis	L 87–89	DeMarcus Cousins (22)	Cousins & Hayes (9)	Isaiah Thomas (8)	Sleep Train Arena; 15,205	27–50
78	April 10	New Orleans	W 121–110	John Salmons (22)	Jason Thompson (8)	Toney Douglas (6)	Sleep Train Arena; 14,275	28–50
79	April 12	@ San Antonio	L 101–108	DeMarcus Cousins (19)	DeMarcus Cousins (12)	Toney Douglas (7)	AT&T Center; 18,581	28–51
80	April 14	@ Houston	L 100–121	Travis Outlaw (15)	Cole Aldrich (12)	Isaiah Thomas (10)	Toyota Center; 18,138	28–52
81	April 15	@ Oklahoma City	L 95–104	Isaiah Thomas (16)	Cole Aldrich (13)	Salmons, Outlaw, & Thornton (3)	Chesapeake Energy Arena; 18,203	28–53
82	April 17	L. A. Clippers	L 108–112	DeMarcus Cousins (36)	DeMarcus Cousins (22)	Isaiah Thomas (10)	Sleep Train Arena; 17,317	28–54

2012–13 season schedule

=== Standings ===
Pacific Division	W	L	PCT	GB	Home	Road	Div	GP
y-Los Angeles Clippers	56	26	.683	–	32–9	24–17	11–5	82
x-Golden State Warriors	47	35	.573	9	28–13	19–22	9–7	82
x-Los Angeles Lakers	45	37	.549	11	29–12	16–25	8–8	82
Sacramento Kings	28	54	.341	28	20–21	8–33	7–9	82
Phoenix Suns	25	57	.305	31	17–24	8–33	5–11	82

Western Conference
#	Team	W	L	PCT	GB	GP
1	c-Oklahoma City Thunder *	60	22	.732	–	82
2	y-San Antonio Spurs *	58	24	.707	2.0	82
3	x-Denver Nuggets *	57	25	.695	3.0	82
4	y-Los Angeles Clippers	56	26	.683	4.0	82
5	x-Memphis Grizzlies	56	26	.683	4.0	82
6	x-Golden State Warriors	47	35	.573	13.0	82
7	x-Los Angeles Lakers	45	37	.549	15.0	82
8	x-Houston Rockets	45	37	.549	15.0	82
9	Utah Jazz	43	39	.524	17.0	82
10	Dallas Mavericks	41	41	.500	19.0	82
11	Portland Trail Blazers	33	49	.402	27.0	82
12	Minnesota Timberwolves	31	51	.378	29.0	82
13	Sacramento Kings	28	54	.341	32.0	82
14	New Orleans Hornets	27	55	.329	33.0	82
15	Phoenix Suns	25	57	.305	35.0	82

== Player statistics ==
Legend
GP	Games played	GS	Games started	MPG	Minutes per game
FG%	Field-goal percentage	3P%	3-point field-goal percentage	FT%	Free-throw percentage
RPG	Rebounds per game	APG	Assists per game	SPG	Steals per game
BPG	Blocks per game	PPG	Points per game

=== Regular season ===
Player	GP	GS	MPG	FG%	3P%	FT%	RPG	APG	SPG	BPG	PPG
Jason Thompson	82	81	27.9	.502	.000	.694	6.7	1.0	.6	.7	10.9
Isaiah Thomas	79	62	26.9	.440	.358	.882	2.0	4.0	.8	.0	13.9
John Salmons	76	72	30.0	.399	.371	.773	2.7	3.0	.7	.3	8.8
DeMarcus Cousins	75	74	30.5	.465	.182	.738	9.9	2.7	1.4	.7	17.1
Chuck Hayes	74	1	16.3	.442	.000	.625	4.0	1.5	.4	.2	2.7
Marcus Thornton	72	8	24.0	.429	.372	.881	2.5	1.3	.8	.1	12.7
Jimmer Fredette	69	0	14.0	.421	.417	.859	1.0	1.3	.4	.0	7.2
Tyreke Evans	65	61	31.0	.478	.338	.775	4.4	3.5	1.4	.4	15.2
James Johnson	54	11	16.3	.413	.095	.597	2.7	1.1	.8	.9	5.1
Thomas Robinson^{†}	51	0	15.9	.424		.577	4.7	.7	.5	.4	4.8
Aaron Brooks^{†}	46	20	20.8	.459	.378	.769	1.7	2.3	.6	.2	8.0
Francisco García^{†}	40	15	17.8	.376	.367	.857	1.7	1.1	.8	.8	5.2
Travis Outlaw	38	2	11.7	.418	.280	.731	1.6	.6	.3	.2	5.3
Patrick Patterson^{†}	24	3	23.2	.494	.444	.786	4.8	1.3	.5	.5	8.0
Toney Douglas^{†}	22	0	17.1	.430	.389	1.000	2.2	2.6	1.4	.0	6.1
Cole Aldrich^{†}	15	0	11.7	.568		.727	4.2	.2	.1	.9	3.3
Tyler Honeycutt	9	0	3.6	.273	.000	1.000	1.1	.2	.0	.1	.9

- ^{†} Denotes player spent time with another team in the season. Stats reflect time with the Kings only.

== Transactions ==
=== Overview ===
Players Added

Via draft

- Thomas Robinson

Via trade

- James Johnson

Via free agency

- Aaron Brooks
Players Lost

Via free agency

- Terrence Williams

Waived

- Hassan Whiteside

=== Trades ===
June 28, 2012 (Draft day)	To Sacramento Kings Cash considerations	To Indiana Pacers Draft rights to Orlando Johnson
July 16, 2012	To Sacramento Kings James Johnson	To Toronto Raptors 2014 second-round pick
February 20, 2013	To Sacramento Kings Patrick Patterson, Toney Douglas, & Cole Aldrich	To Houston Rockets Thomas Robinson, Francisco García, Tyler Honeycutt

=== Free agents ===
Additions
Player	Date signed	Former team
Jason Thompson	July 11	Sacramento Kings (re-signed)
Aaron Brooks	July 16	Guangdong Southern Tigers (China)

Subtractions
Player	Date left	New team
Terrence Williams	October 1	Detroit Pistons
