= Tony Allen (basketball) =

American basketball player (born 1982)

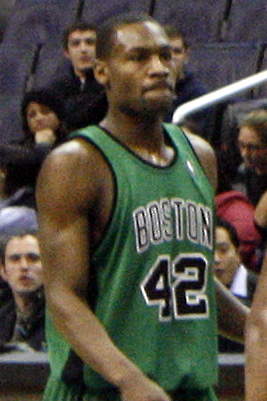
- Allen with the Boston Celtics in 2008

Personal information
- Born: January 11, 1982 (age 44) Chicago, Illinois, U.S.
- Listed height: 6 ft 4 in (1.93 m)
- Listed weight: 213 lb (97 kg)

Career information
- High school: Crane (Chicago, Illinois)
- College: Butler County CC (2000–2001); Wabash Valley (2001–2002); Oklahoma State (2002–2004)
- NBA draft: 2004: 1st round, 25th overall pick
- Drafted by: Boston Celtics
- Playing career: 2004–2018
- Position: Shooting guard / small forward
- Number: 42, 9, 24

Career history
- 2004–2010: Boston Celtics
- 2010–2017: Memphis Grizzlies
- 2017–2018: New Orleans Pelicans

Career highlights
- NBA champion (2008); 3× NBA All-Defensive First Team (2012, 2013, 2015); 3× NBA All-Defensive Second Team (2011, 2016, 2017); No. 9 retired by Memphis Grizzlies; Big 12 Player of the Year (2004); First-team All-Big 12 (2004); Big 12 Newcomer of the Year (2003); Big 12 tournament MVP (2004)

Career NBA statistics
- Points: 6,654 (8.1 ppg)
- Rebounds: 2,884 (3.5 rpg)
- Steals: 1,158 (1.4 spg)
- Stats at NBA.com
- Stats at Basketball Reference

Anthony Allen (born January 11, 1982) is an American former professional basketball player. Allen played for 14 seasons in the National Basketball Association (NBA), primarily for the Boston Celtics and Memphis Grizzlies. Nicknamed "the Grindfather", he is a six-time member on the NBA All-Defensive Team, including three first-team selections. Allen won an NBA championship with the Boston Celtics in 2008. Known for his suffocating on-ball pressure, he is widely regarded as one of the best defenders in NBA history.

== College career ==
=== Junior college (2000–2002) ===
Allen attended Crane High School in Chicago, where he played alongside fellow future NBA player Will Bynum. As a college freshman in 2000–01, Allen averaged 16.5 points, 6.1 rebounds, and 2.8 steals in 32 games (31 starts) for Butler County Community College. He was subsequently named Second Team All-Jayhawk West Conference and the Jayhawk West Freshman of the Year.

As a sophomore, Allen averaged 14.5 points and 5.3 rebounds in 38 games for Wabash Valley College. He led Wabash Valley to a 32–6 record and a fourth-place finish at the NJCAA Championships. He was subsequently named Second Team All-Region XXIV.

=== Oklahoma State (2002–2004) ===
For his junior season, Allen transferred to Oklahoma State University, where he averaged 14.4 points and 5.4 rebounds in 32 games (28 starts) in 2002–03. He subsequently earned Big 12 Newcomer of the Year honors.

As a senior in 2003–04, Allen led Oklahoma State in scoring and guided the Cowboys to the 2004 NCAA Final Four; he recorded 13 points, 4 rebounds, and 4 assists in Oklahoma State's Final Four loss to Georgia Tech on April 3, 2004. He was subsequently named Big 12 Player of the Year and earned an Honorable Mention All-America by the Associated Press. By the end of the 2003–04 season, Allen had become the first player in Cowboys history to surpass the 1,000 career point threshold in only two seasons.

== Professional career ==
=== Boston Celtics (2004–2010) ===
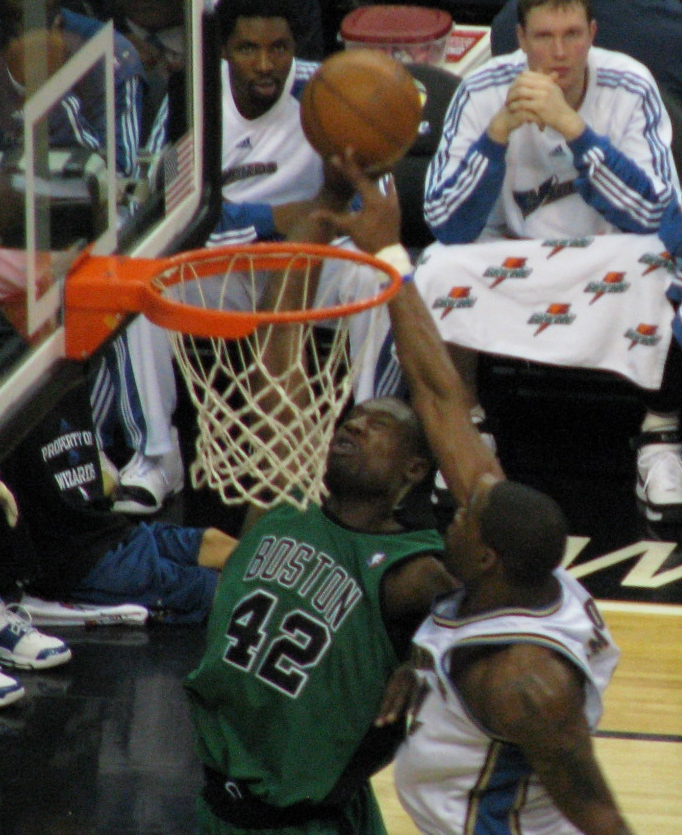
Allen being fouled by Antawn Jamison in 2008

Allen was drafted by the Boston Celtics in the first round (25th overall) of the 2004 NBA draft on June 24, 2004, and signed a multi-year contract with the Celtics on July 3, 2004. As a rookie in the 2004–05 season, he averaged 6.4 points, 2.9 rebounds, and 0.99 steals in 16.4 minutes over 77 games (34 starts). He scored 20 points in his first career start on January 22, 2005, against the Atlanta Hawks. He later participated in the Rookie Challenge at the 2005 NBA All-Star Weekend, scoring a team-high 17 points.

In his first game of his 2006 campaign, Allen recorded 9 points, 7 rebounds, and 2 steals during a home game loss to the Hawks. On March 20, 2006, Allen recorded a season-high 18 points and 4 steals in a home loss to the Los Angeles Lakers. He tied his season-high 18 points on April 9, which came in a loss to the New York Knicks. Eight days later, he broke his season-high as he scored 23 points to go along with 4 rebounds and 3 steals in a home game loss to the Cleveland Cavaliers. Allen went on to average 7.2 points, 2.2 rebounds, 1.3 assists, and 1.0 steal in 19.2 minutes in 51 games (nine starts) in his sophomore season with the Celtics.

On December 4, 2006, Allen scored a season-high of 20 points during a loss to the Chicago Bulls. Two games later, he posted 18 points, 7 rebounds, and 5 steals in a loss to the Suns, with 6 of his 7 rebounds being offensive rebounds. On December 15, 2006, against the Denver Nuggets, Allen scored a career-high 30 points to go with 8 rebounds. On January 7, 2007, Allen recorded 21 points, 9 rebounds, and 7 steals in a road loss to the Orlando Magic. In a contest against the Indiana Pacers on January 10, 2007, Allen suffered a season-ending tear of the anterior cruciate ligament (ACL) and medial collateral ligament (MCL) of his left knee; Allen hurt the knee when he landed awkwardly after an uncontested dunk attempt after the whistle in the final minutes of the 97–84 loss. In his third season, Allen averaged career-highs of 11.5 points, 3.8 rebounds, 1.7 assists, and 1.5 steals per game.

Allen recovered in time for the start of the 2007–08 season. In his first game after the injury, Allen scored 4 points and grabbed 5 rebounds during a victory over the visiting Washington Wizards. In his first double-digit scoring output since the injury, Allen recorded 13 points in a win over the New Jersey Nets on November 14. He scored a season-high 20 points in a home game win versus the Memphis Grizzlies. Almost four weeks later, Allen tied his season high during a road victory over the Miami Heat. Allen scored 18 points to go along with 4 rebounds in a February 20 road loss to the Golden State Warriors. At the end of the regular season, he averaged 6.6 points, 2.2 rebounds, and 1.5 assists in 18.3 minutes over 75 games (11 starts). He substantially contributed to the Celtics' successful playoff run that led to an NBA Finals berth, where they claimed the 2008 NBA Championship after defeating the Los Angeles Lakers in six games.

In July 2008, Allen re-signed with the Celtics after agreeing to a two-year guaranteed deal paying $2.5 million each year. Allen went on to average 7.8 points, 2.3 rebounds, 1.4 assists, and 1.17 steals in 19.3 minutes in 46 games (two starts) in his fifth season with the Celtics.

Allen played a pivotal defensive role for the Eastern Conference champion Celtics during the 2009–10 season, averaging 6.1 points, 2.7 rebounds, 1.3 assists, and 1.07 steals in 16.5 minutes in 77 games (eight starts). He recorded his first career double-double with 10 points and 10 rebounds on December 27, 2009, against the Los Angeles Clippers. During the 2010 playoffs, Allen played in all 24 games and averaged 5.1 points and 1.04 steals in 16.3 minutes. The Celtics reached the 2010 NBA Finals, where they were defeated 4–3 by the Lakers.

=== Memphis Grizzlies (2010–2017) ===
==== 2010–11 season ====
On July 13, 2010, Allen signed a three-year contract with the Memphis Grizzlies, reportedly worth $9.7 million. Two weeks after signing with the Grizzlies, Allen revealed he felt 'overshadowed' in Boston by teammates Paul Pierce, Rajon Rondo, and Ray Allen.

Allen emerged as one of the league's premier perimeter defenders in his first season with Memphis, averaging 1.79 steals and helping the Grizzlies lead the NBA in steals and forced turnovers. Allen was subsequently named to the 2010–11 NBA All-Defensive Second Team, marking his first and the Grizzlies' first selection to an All-Defensive Team and finished fourth in the voting for Defensive Player of the Year. He averaged 4.14 steals per 48 minutes, the highest rate by an NBA player since Nate McMillan in 1993–94. Allen averaged 8.9 points, 2.7 rebounds, and 1.4 assists on .510 shooting in 20.8 minutes in 72 games (31 starts). He went on to help the Grizzlies advance to the Western Conference Semifinals for the first time in franchise history.

==== 2011–12 season ====
In the lockout-shortened 2011–12 season, Allen averaged 9.8 points, 4.0 rebounds, and 1.4 assists on .469 shooting in 26.3 minutes over 58 games (57 starts). He recorded a franchise record and set a career high when he made 8 steals on April 23, 2012, against the Cleveland Cavaliers. He was subsequently named to the 2011–12 NBA All-Defensive First Team after placing fifth in the NBA in steals per game (career-high 1.79) and third in steals per 48 minutes (3.27). He also finished sixth in voting for the 2011–12 NBA Defensive Player of the Year, the highest for any guard. In January 2012, he was voted the best perimeter defender in the NBA by the league's general managers.

==== 2012–13 season ====
In 2012–13, Allen led all players receiving votes for the NBA All-Defensive teams, marking his second-straight First Team All-Defense honor and third consecutive NBA All-Defense selection. He finished fifth in balloting for 2012–13 Defensive Player of the Year after averaging a career-high 4.6 rebounds and 1.51 steals in 26.7 minutes in a career-high 79 games (all starts). During the 2013 playoffs, Allen averaged playoff career highs across the board with 10.3 points, 6.1 rebounds, 1.8 assists, and 2.0 steals in 28.1 minutes in 15 postseason games, helping Memphis advance to the Western Conference Finals for the first time in franchise history.

==== 2013–14 season ====
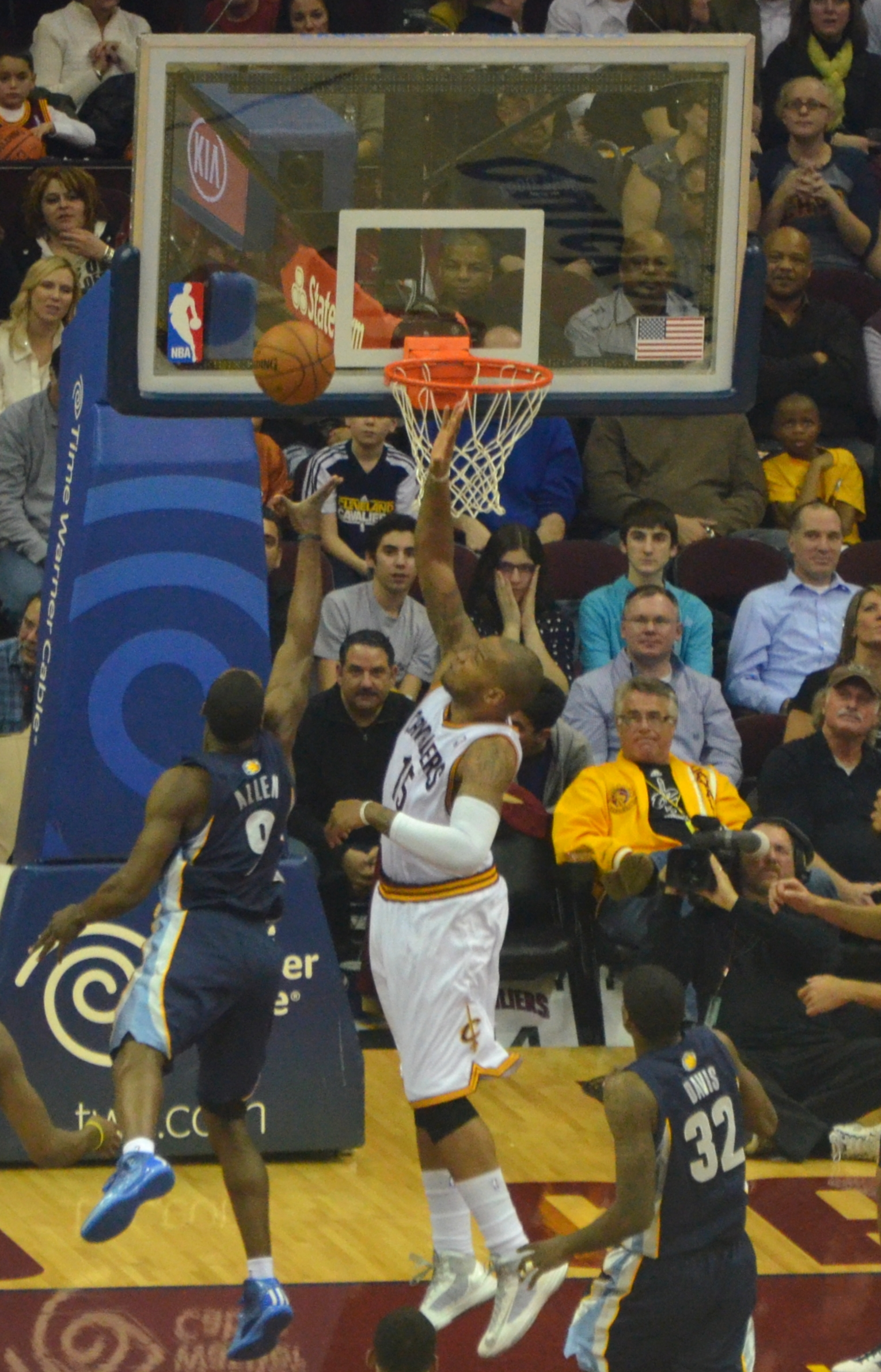
Allen (left) attempting a layup in 2013

On July 15, 2013, Allen re-signed with the Grizzlies on a four-year contract worth $20 million. Allen concluded his fourth season in Memphis and 10th in the NBA with averages of 9.0 points, 3.8 rebounds, and 1.64 steals on .494 shooting in 23.2 minutes in 55 games (28 starts). He missed 27 games due to injury, illness, or league suspension.

The Grizzlies entered the playoffs as the seventh seed and faced the Oklahoma City Thunder. Allen recorded 10 offensive rebounds in Game 4 against the Thunder, becoming the sixth reserve to record 10+ offensive rebounds in a postseason game since the 1986 Playoffs, joining centers John Salley, Roy Tarpley, Jayson Williams, Greg Ostertag, and Jeff Foster. He finished Game 4 with 14 points and 13 rebounds, becoming the second Grizzlies reserve to register a double‐double in a playoff game, joining Lorenzen Wright (10 points, 10 rebounds on April 29, 2006). The Grizzlies were ultimately eliminated by the Thunder in seven games.

==== 2014–15 season ====
In 2014–15, Allen continued to be a defensive stalwart while guarding the opposing team's best offensive talent. He made his third NBA All-Defensive First Team (and fourth career All-Defense accolade) after ranking fourth in the league in steals per game (2.0) while playing 26.2 minutes per game. Allen was the only player in 2014–15 to record at least three games with six or more steals.

==== 2015–16 season ====
In May 2016, Allen was named to the NBA All-Defensive Second Team for the 2015–16 season, marking the fifth career All-Defensive selection for Allen in six seasons with the Grizzlies. Allen averaged 8.4 points, 4.6 rebounds, 1.1 assists, and 1.72 steals in 25.3 minutes in 64 games (57 starts) for Memphis in 2015–16. He was tied for the NBA lead with Minnesota's Ricky Rubio in steals per 48 minutes (3.3) among players with a minimum of 1,500 total minutes played. The Grizzlies' defensive rating was 2.2 points better with Allen on the floor (104.1) than with him off the floor (106.3). In addition, Allen led the team with 1.7 steals per game.

==== 2016–17 season ====
On June 26, 2017, Allen was named to the NBA All-Defensive Second Team for the 2016–17 season, marking the sixth career All-Defensive selection for Allen, having now been recognized on the NBA All-Defensive Teams six times in his seven seasons with the Grizzlies. Allen appeared in 71 games (66 starts) for Memphis in 2016–17, averaging 9.1 points, 5.5 rebounds, 1.4 assists, and a team-leading 1.62 steals in 27 minutes per game. He led the league in steal percentage (3.1), his second time to lead the league in the category (4.1 in 2014–15).

On October 12, 2017, the Grizzlies announced they will retire Allen's No. 9 jersey when he retires.

=== New Orleans Pelicans (2017–2018) ===
On September 15, 2017, Allen signed with the New Orleans Pelicans. On November 1, 2017, he had a season-high 10 points in 19 minutes off the bench in a 104–98 loss to the Minnesota Timberwolves. On December 10, 2017, against the Philadelphia 76ers, Allen suffered a fractured left fibula. He was nearing a return in mid-January, but on January 15, he was sidelined for another two to four weeks after suffering a setback during his recovery.

On February 1, 2018, Allen was traded, along with Ömer Aşık, Jameer Nelson, and a protected first-round pick, to the Chicago Bulls in exchange for Nikola Mirotić and a 2018 second-round pick. In addition, Chicago will have the right to swap its 2021 second-round pick with New Orleans' own 2021 second-round pick. Allen was waived by the Bulls eight days later before appearing in a game for them.

== NBA career statistics ==
Legend
GP	Games played	GS	Games started	MPG	Minutes per game
FG%	Field goal percentage	3P%	3-point field goal percentage	FT%	Free throw percentage
RPG	Rebounds per game	APG	Assists per game	SPG	Steals per game
BPG	Blocks per game	PPG	Points per game	**Bold**	Career high
†	Won an NBA championship

=== Regular season ===
Year	Team	GP	GS	MPG	FG%	3P%	FT%	RPG	APG	SPG	BPG	PPG
2004–05	Boston	77	34	16.4	.475	**.387**	.737	2.9	.8	1.0	.3	6.4
2005–06	Boston	51	9	19.2	.471	.324	.746	2.2	1.3	1.0	.4	7.2
2006–07	Boston	33	18	24.4	**.514**	.242	.784	3.8	**1.7**	1.5	.4	**11.5**
2007–08†	Boston	75	11	18.3	.434	.316	.762	2.2	1.5	.8	.3	6.6
2008–09	Boston	46	2	19.3	.482	.222	.725	2.3	1.4	1.2	.5	7.8
2009–10	Boston	54	8	16.5	.510	.000	.605	2.7	1.3	1.1	.4	6.1
2010–11	Memphis	72	31	20.8	.510	.174	.753	2.7	1.4	1.8	**.6**	8.9
2011–12	Memphis	58	57	26.3	.469	.308	**.800**	4.0	1.4	1.8	**.6**	9.8
2012–13	Memphis	**79**	**79**	26.7	.445	.125	.717	4.6	1.2	1.5	**.6**	8.9
2013–14	Memphis	55	28	23.2	.494	.234	.628	3.8	**1.7**	1.6	.3	9.0
2014–15	Memphis	63	41	26.2	.495	.345	.627	4.4	1.4	**2.0**	.5	8.6
2015–16	Memphis	64	57	25.3	.458	.357	.652	4.6	1.1	1.7	.3	8.4
2016–17	Memphis	71	66	**27.0**	.461	.278	.615	**5.5**	1.4	1.6	.4	9.1
2017–18	New Orleans	22	0	12.4	.484	.333	.524	2.1	.4	.5	.1	4.7
Career		820	441	22.0	.475	.282	.709	3.5	1.3	1.4	.4	8.1

=== Playoffs ===
Year	Team	GP	GS	MPG	FG%	3P%	FT%	RPG	APG	SPG	BPG	PPG
2005	Boston	7	3	12.9	.444	.000	.429	1.7	.3	.4	.3	2.7
2008†	Boston	15	0	4.3	**.563**	.000	.400	.2	.2	.1	.0	1.3
2009	Boston	10	0	6.0	.500	.000	**1.000**	.9	.3	.2	.0	.9
2010	Boston	**24**	0	16.3	.480	.000	.778	1.7	.7	1.0	.6	5.1
2011	Memphis	13	13	26.9	.426	.143	.659	2.9	1.5	1.9	.4	8.8
2012	Memphis	7	7	24.3	.400	.000	.706	3.1	.7	1.3	1.0	6.9
2013	Memphis	15	**15**	28.1	.432	**.250**	.759	6.1	**1.8**	2.0	.3	10.3
2014	Memphis	7	1	**32.9**	.486	.000	.762	**7.7**	1.3	1.7	.1	**12.3**
2015	Memphis	10	9	27.9	.491	.143	.750	5.2	1.5	**2.4**	**1.1**	6.6
2016	Memphis	4	2	23.5	.303	.143	.692	2.8	.8	1.3	.5	7.5
Career		112	50	19.2	.447	.106	.716	3.0	.9	1.2	.4	6.0

== Player profile ==
Standing at 6 feet 4 inches tall (1.93 m) and weighing 213 pounds (97 kg), Allen played both the shooting guard and small forward positions. Allen was known as an elite, all-purpose defender and was often assigned to defend high-scoring swingmen, making it uncomfortable for players to score against him. Allen was named to the NBA All-Defensive Team six out of seven times from 2011 to 2017.

On February 26, 2016, in a game against the Los Angeles Lakers, Kobe Bryant presented Allen with an autographed pair of shoes that read, "To Tony, the best defender I ever faced!" Both players were inactive for the game.

As a Boston Celtic, Allen was given the nickname "Gucci" by his teammates. With the Grizzlies, he earned the nickname "Grindfather."

== Personal life ==
Allen is the son of Ella Allen. He has two sisters, Ebony and Dominique, and a brother, Ryan, who played on the Grizzlies' 2012 Summer League squad following a four-year collegiate career at Wisconsin-Milwaukee.

=== Legal issues ===
In November 2005, Allen was indicted on three counts of aggravated battery following a fight which led to a shooting in August 2005 in Chicago. He was found not guilty at trial in April 2007.

On October 7, 2021, Allen was indicted for insurance fraud in the Southern District of New York for allegedly defrauding the NBA's health and welfare benefit plan. On August 8, 2023, Allen was sentenced to three years of probation and community service with supervision, avoiding prison altogether, due to him paying back most of the $420,000 he had taken illegally before being arrested. The arrest in 2021 was considered the biggest reason for why Allen's #9 wasn't retired during the 2021–22 season alongside teammate Zach Randolph and instead was delayed until March 15, 2025, against the Miami Heat.

On November 28, 2021, Allen was charged with domestic assault, domestic vandalism, and interference with emergency calls in connection with an incident involving his wife. In January 2022, the charges were dismissed.

On November 5, 2025 Allen was arrested in Arkansas and charged with multiple drug offenses. According to police, Allen was a passenger in a vehicle when the Poinsett County Sheriff's Department stopped it on Interstate 555 near Memphis. During a search of the vehicle, police found controlled substances and drug paraphernalia. Both Allen and the driver were arrested.
