= 2012–13 Memphis Grizzlies season =

- Head coach: Lionel Hollins
- General manager: Chris Wallace
- Owners: Robert Pera
- Arena: FedExForum

Results
- Record: 56–26 (.683)
- Place: Division: 2nd (Southwest); Conference: 5th (Western)
- Playoff finish: Western Conference Finals (lost to Spurs 0–4)
- Stats at Basketball Reference

Local media
- Television: Fox Sports Tennessee; Fox Sports Southeast
- Radio: WRBO

The 2012–13 Memphis Grizzlies season was the 18th season of the franchise in the National Basketball Association (NBA), and the 12th for the franchise in Memphis.

The season saw the Grizzlies make the conference finals for the first time in franchise history. Prior to making the conference finals, the Grizzlies defeated the Los Angeles Clippers in six games in the first round, and defeated the top-seeded defending runner-up Oklahoma City Thunder in five games in the semifinals. However, a four-game sweep to the experienced San Antonio Spurs ended the Grizzlies' season and playoff run. Head coach Lionel Hollins was fired at the conclusion of the season.

Led by Marc Gasol, the Defensive Player of the Year, the 2013 Grizzlies held opponents to 89.3 points per game. This is the last time a team allowed under 90 points per game in an NBA season.

As of 2026, this remains the only season where the Grizzlies have advanced to the Western Conference Finals.

== Key dates ==
- June 28: The 2012 NBA draft took place at Prudential Center in Newark, New Jersey.

== Draft picks ==
Round	Pick	Player	Position	Nationality	School
1	25	Tony Wroten	SG	United States	Washington

== Roster ==
2012–13 Memphis Grizzlies roster
Players

Pos.	No.	Player	Height	Weight	DOB	From
SG	9	Tony Allen	6 ft 4 in (1.93 m)	213 lb (97 kg)	1982–01–11	Oklahoma State
PF	00	Darrell Arthur	6 ft 9 in (2.06 m)	235 lb (107 kg)	1988–03–25	Kansas
G	7	Jerryd Bayless	6 ft 3 in (1.91 m)	200 lb (91 kg)	1988–08–20	Arizona
PG	11	Mike Conley Jr.	6 ft 1 in (1.85 m)	185 lb (84 kg)	1987–10–11	Ohio State
F/C	32	Ed Davis	6 ft 10 in (2.08 m)	225 lb (102 kg)	1989–06–05	North Carolina
F	5	Austin Daye	6 ft 11 in (2.11 m)	200 lb (91 kg)	1988–06–05	Gonzaga
G	55	Keyon Dooling	6 ft 3 in (1.91 m)	195 lb (88 kg)	1980–05–08	Missouri
C	33	Marc Gasol	7 ft 1 in (2.16 m)	265 lb (120 kg)	1985–01–29	Lausanne CS (TN)
F	13	Donté Greene	6 ft 11 in (2.11 m)	226 lb (103 kg)	1988–02–21	Syracuse
PF	30	Jon Leuer	6 ft 10 in (2.08 m)	228 lb (103 kg)	1989–05–14	Wisconsin
G/F	20	Quincy Pondexter	6 ft 6 in (1.98 m)	225 lb (102 kg)	1988–03–10	Washington
SF	21	Tayshaun Prince	6 ft 9 in (2.06 m)	215 lb (98 kg)	1980–02–28	Kentucky
F/C	50	Zach Randolph	6 ft 9 in (2.06 m)	260 lb (118 kg)	1981–07–16	Michigan State
F/C	3	Willie Reed	6 ft 10 in (2.08 m)	220 lb (100 kg)	1990–05–16	Saint Louis
SG	1	Tony Wroten	6 ft 6 in (1.98 m)	205 lb (93 kg)	1993–04–13	Washington

Coaches
Head coach
- Lionel Hollins
Assistant(s)
- Henry Bibby
- Dave Joerger
- Barry Hecker
- Bob Thornton

Legend
- (DP) Unsigned draft pick
- (FA) Free agent
- (S) Suspended
- (DL) On assignment to D-League affiliate
- Injured

Roster
Updated: 2013–05–27

== Regular season ==
=== Standings ===
Southwest Division	W	L	PCT	GB	Home	Road	Div	GP
y-San Antonio Spurs	58	24	.707	–	35–6	23–18	12–4	82
x-Memphis Grizzlies	56	26	.683	2	32–9	24–17	10–6	82
x-Houston Rockets	45	37	.549	13	29–12	16–25	6–10	82
Dallas Mavericks	41	41	.500	17	24–17	17–24	7–9	82
New Orleans Hornets	27	55	.329	31	16–25	11–30	5–11	82

Western Conference
#	Team	W	L	PCT	GB	GP
1	c-Oklahoma City Thunder *	60	22	.732	–	82
2	y-San Antonio Spurs *	58	24	.707	2.0	82
3	x-Denver Nuggets *	57	25	.695	3.0	82
4	y-Los Angeles Clippers	56	26	.683	4.0	82
5	x-Memphis Grizzlies	56	26	.683	4.0	82
6	x-Golden State Warriors	47	35	.573	13.0	82
7	x-Los Angeles Lakers	45	37	.549	15.0	82
8	x-Houston Rockets	45	37	.549	15.0	82
9	Utah Jazz	43	39	.524	17.0	82
10	Dallas Mavericks	41	41	.500	19.0	82
11	Portland Trail Blazers	33	49	.402	27.0	82
12	Minnesota Timberwolves	31	51	.378	29.0	82
13	Sacramento Kings	28	54	.341	32.0	82
14	New Orleans Hornets	27	55	.329	33.0	82
15	Phoenix Suns	25	57	.305	35.0	82

=== Game log ===
2012–13 game log
Total: 56–26 (home: 32–9; road: 24–17)
October: 0–1 (home: 0–0; road: 0–1)

Game	Date	Team	Score	High points	High rebounds	High assists	Location Attendance	Record
1	October 31	@ L. A. Clippers	L 92–101	Rudy Gay (25)	Zach Randolph (16)	Conley & Gasol (5)	Staples Center; 19,060	0–1

November : 12–1 (home: 8–1; road: 4–0)

Game	Date	Team	Score	High points	High rebounds	High assists	Location Attendance	Record
2	November 2	@ Golden State	W 104–94	Conley & Gasol (21)	Zach Randolph (14)	Mike Conley Jr. (7)	Oracle Arena; 19,596	1–1
3	November 5	Utah	W 103–94	Marc Gasol (22)	Zach Randolph (18)	Marc Gasol (8)	FedExForum; 17,401	2–1
4	November 7	@ Milwaukee	W 108–90	Randolph & Speights (18)	Zach Randolph (13)	Mike Conley Jr. (12)	BMO Harris Bradley Center; 11,465	3–1
5	November 9	Houston	W 93–85	Rudy Gay (21)	Zach Randolph (14)	Mike Conley Jr. (4)	FedExForum; 16,087	4–1
6	November 11	Miami	W 104–86	Wayne Ellington (25)	Zach Randolph (12)	Mike Conley Jr. (9)	FedExForum; 18,119	5–1
7	November 14	@ Oklahoma City	W 107–97	Rudy Gay (28)	Zach Randolph (11)	Mike Conley Jr. (7)	Chesapeake Energy Arena; 18,203	6–1
8	November 16	New York	W 105–95	Marc Gasol (24)	Zach Randolph (15)	Mike Conley Jr. (8)	FedExForum; 17,516	7–1
9	November 17	@ Charlotte	W 94–87	Mike Conley Jr. (20)	Zach Randolph (12)	Marc Gasol (7)	Time Warner Cable Arena; 16,541	8–1
10	November 19	Denver	L 92–97	Rudy Gay (22)	Zach Randolph (13)	Mike Conley Jr. (8)	FedExForum; 15,111	8–2
11	November 23	L. A. Lakers	W 106–98	Rudy Gay (21)	Zach Randolph (12)	Marc Gasol (8)	FedExForum; 18,119	9–2
12	November 26	Cleveland	W 84–78	Gasol & Randolph (19)	Zach Randolph (8)	Jerryd Bayless (6)	FedExForum; 13,485	10–2
13	November 28	Toronto	W 103–82	Marreese Speights (18)	Zach Randolph (13)	Zach Randolph (6)	FedExForum; 14,603	11–2
14	November 30	Detroit	W 90–78	Rudy Gay (18)	Marc Gasol (11)	Mike Conley Jr. (5)	FedExForum; 16,732	12–2

December : 7–7 (home: 5–2; road: 2–5)

Game	Date	Team	Score	High points	High rebounds	High assists	Location Attendance	Record
15	December 1	@ San Antonio	L 95–99	Marc Gasol (20)	Zach Randolph (15)	Mike Conley Jr. (12)	AT&T Center; 18,581	12–3
16	December 4	Phoenix	W 108–98	Zach Randolph (38)	Zach Randolph (22)	Marc Gasol (4)	FedExForum; 14,481	13–3
17	December 7	@ New Orleans	W 96–89	Rudy Gay (28)	Marc Gasol (9)	Mike Conley Jr. (9)	New Orleans Arena; 13,698	14–3
18	December 8	Atlanta	L 83–93	Gasol & Randolph (18)	Zach Randolph (13)	Marc Gasol (5)	FedExForum; 17,612	14–4
19	December 12	@ Phoenix	L 80–82	Rudy Gay (21)	Rudy Gay (11)	Mike Conley Jr. (6)	US Airways Center; 13,093	14–5
20	December 14	@ Denver	L 94–99	Rudy Gay (21)	Marc Gasol (9)	Jerryd Bayless (11)	Pepsi Center; 16,367	14–6
21	December 15	@ Utah	W 99–86	Zach Randolph (25)	Zach Randolph (16)	Mike Conley Jr. (8)	EnergySolutions Arena; 18,183	15–6
22	December 17	Chicago	W 80–71	Mike Conley Jr. (17)	Zach Randolph (15)	Mike Conley Jr. (4)	FedExForum; 17,305	16–6
23	December 19	Milwaukee	W 90–80	Zach Randolph (15)	Zach Randolph (17)	Mike Conley Jr. (6)	FedExForum; 16,007	17–6
24	December 21	Dallas	W 92–82	Rudy Gay (26)	Zach Randolph (13)	Mike Conley Jr. (11)	FedExForum; 17,677	18–6
25	December 22	@ Houston	L 96–121	Mike Conley Jr. (16)	Zach Randolph (10)	Mike Conley Jr. (6)	Toyota Center; 18,029	18–7
26	December 26	Philadelphia	L 89–99	Zach Randolph (23)	Zach Randolph (9)	Marc Gasol (8)	FedExForum; 16,055	18–8
27	December 29	Denver	W 81–72	Rudy Gay (19)	Marreese Speights (10)	Mike Conley Jr. (6)	FedExForum; 17,707	19–8
28	December 31	@ Indiana	L 83–88	Zach Randolph (21)	Zach Randolph (15)	Mike Conley Jr. (7)	Bankers Life Fieldhouse; 14,979	19–9

January : 10–7 (home: 4–4; road: 6–3)

Game	Date	Team	Score	High points	High rebounds	High assists	Location Attendance	Record
29	January 2	@ Boston	W 93–83	Mike Conley Jr. (23)	Zach Randolph (8)	Mike Conley Jr. (9)	TD Garden; 18,624	20–9
30	January 4	Portland	L 84–86	Marreese Speights (22)	Marreese Speights (13)	Conley & Gasol (3)	FedExForum; 15,823	20–10
31	January 6	@ Phoenix	W 92–81	Zach Randolph (21)	Marc Gasol (12)	Mike Conley Jr. (9)	US Airways Center; 13,197	21–10
32	January 7	@ Sacramento	W 113–81	Wayne Ellington (26)	Zach Randolph (7)	Mike Conley Jr. (8)	Sleep Train Arena; 11,531	22–10
33	January 9	@ Golden State	W 94–87	Zach Randolph (19)	Zach Randolph (12)	Bayless & Gay (6)	Oracle Arena; 19,596	23–10
34	January 11	San Antonio	W 101–98	Rudy Gay (23)	Zach Randolph (10)	Mike Conley Jr. (5)	FedExForum; 17,685	24–10
35	January 12	@ Dallas	L 83–104	Rudy Gay (12)	Darrell Arthur (9)	Jerryd Bayless (5)	American Airlines Center; 19,984	24–11
36	January 14	L. A. Clippers	L 73–99	Zach Randolph (15)	Zach Randolph (12)	Tony Allen (4)	FedExForum; 15,837	24–12
37	January 16	@ San Antonio	L 82–103	Rudy Gay (17)	Rudy Gay (8)	Mike Conley Jr. (3)	AT&T Center; 18,581	24–13
38	January 18	Sacramento	W 85–69	Mike Conley Jr. (19)	Marc Gasol (10)	Tony Allen (6)	FedExForum; 15,910	25–13
39	January 19	@ Chicago	W 85–82	Marc Gasol (19)	Zach Randolph (19)	Mike Conley Jr. (9)	United Center; 22,124	26–13
40	January 21	Indiana	L 81–82	Wayne Ellington (17)	Rudy Gay (8)	Jerryd Bayless (5)	FedExForum; 17,508	26–14
41	January 23	L. A. Lakers	W 106–93	Darrell Arthur (20)	Rudy Gay (11)	Mike Conley Jr. (6)	FedExForum; 17,984	27–14
42	January 25	Brooklyn	W 101–77	Marc Gasol (20)	Gasol & Randolph (9)	Jerryd Bayless (8)	FedExForum; 16,911	28–14
43	January 27	New Orleans	L 83–91	Zach Randolph (20)	Zach Randolph (13)	Jerryd Bayless (5)	FedExForum; 16,277	28–15
44	January 28	@ Philadelphia	W 103–100	Marc Gasol (27)	Zach Randolph (12)	Jerryd Bayless (9)	Wells Fargo Center; 15,448	29–15
45	January 31	@ Oklahoma City	L 89–106	Jerryd Bayless (23)	Zach Randolph (19)	Jerryd Bayless (6)	Chesapeake Energy Arena; 18,203	29–16

February : 9–2 (home: 6–1; road: 3–1)

Game	Date	Team	Score	High points	High rebounds	High assists	Location Attendance	Record
46	February 1	Washington	W 85–76	Mike Conley Jr. (18)	Marc Gasol (15)	Mike Conley Jr. (6)	FedExForum; 15,017	30–16
47	February 5	Phoenix	L 90–96	Jerryd Bayless (29)	Zach Randolph (13)	Mike Conley Jr. (5)	FedExForum; 14,933	30–17
48	February 6	@ Atlanta	L 92–103	Zach Randolph (20)	Marc Gasol (10)	Mike Conley Jr. (8)	Philips Arena; 13,198	30–18
49	February 8	Golden State	W 99–93	Marc Gasol (20)	Zach Randolph (12)	Mike Conley Jr. (10)	FedExForum; 16,701	31–18
50	February 10	Minnesota	W 105–88	Tayshaun Prince (18)	Marc Gasol (9)	Conley & Gasol (8)	FedExForum; 16,023	32–18
51	February 12	Sacramento	W 108–101	Marc Gasol (24)	Marc Gasol (12)	Mike Conley Jr. (7)	FedExForum; 14,722	33–18
All-Star Break
52	February 19	@ Detroit	W 105–91	Mike Conley Jr. (19)	Zach Randolph (10)	Jerryd Bayless (10)	The Palace of Auburn Hills; 13,481	34–18
53	February 20	@ Toronto	W 88–82	Randolph & Conley (17)	Zach Randolph (18)	Mike Conley Jr. (6)	Air Canada Centre; 19,800	35–18
54	February 22	Orlando	W 88–82	Marc Gasol (19)	Zach Randolph (14)	Mike Conley Jr. (7)	FedExForum; 17,669	36–18
55	February 24	@ Brooklyn	W 76–72	Zach Randolph (16)	Zach Randolph (14)	Mike Conley Jr. (7)	Barclays Center; 17,098	37–18
56	February 27	Dallas	W 90–84	Zach Randolph (22)	Marc Gasol (12)	Mike Conley Jr. (6)	FedExForum; 16,017	38–18

March : 11–6 (home: 6–0; road: 5–6)

Game	Date	Team	Score	High points	High rebounds	High assists	Location Attendance	Record
57	March 1	@ Miami	L 91–98	Marc Gasol (24)	Zach Randolph (9)	Mike Conley Jr. (8)	American Airlines Arena; 20,128	38–19
58	March 3	@ Orlando	W 108–82	Tayshaun Prince (14)	Ed Davis (10)	Marc Gasol (11)	Amway Center; 16,020	39–19
59	March 6	Portland	W 91–85	Marc Gasol (23)	Marc Gasol (12)	Mike Conley Jr. (6)	FedExForum; 16,214	40–19
60	March 8	@ Cleveland	W 103–92	Marc Gasol (22)	Ed Davis (9)	Mike Conley Jr. (11)	Quicken Loans Arena; 17,032	41–19
61	March 9	New Orleans	W 96–85	Mike Conley Jr. (22)	Ed Davis (9)	Mike Conley Jr. (8)	FedExForum; 17,501	42–19
62	March 12	@ Portland	W 102–97	Marc Gasol (20)	Zach Randolph (10)	Mike Conley Jr. (15)	Rose Garden; 18,754	43–19
63	March 13	@ L. A. Clippers	W 96–85	Marc Gasol (21)	Zach Randolph (8)	Mike Conley Jr. (11)	Staples Center; 19,316	44–19
64	March 15	@ Denver	L 80–87	Zach Randolph (18)	Zach Randolph (18)	Marc Gasol (5)	Pepsi Center; 19,408	44–20
65	March 16	@ Utah	L 84–90	Jerryd Bayless (24)	Zach Randolph (9)	Mike Conley Jr. (4)	EnergySolutions Arena; 17,122	44–21
66	March 18	Minnesota	W 92–77	Mike Conley Jr. (20)	Tayshaun Prince (14)	Mike Conley Jr. (6)	FedExForum; 16,378	45–21
67	March 20	Oklahoma City	W 90–89 (OT)	Mike Conley Jr. (24)	Zach Randolph (18)	Mike Conley Jr. (5)	FedExForum; 18,119	46–21
68	March 22	@ New Orleans	L 83–90	Mike Conley Jr. (20)	Zach Randolph (9)	Marc Gasol (4)	New Orleans Arena; 16,494	46–22
69	March 23	Boston	W 110–106	Jerryd Bayless (30)	Zach Randolph (11)	Mike Conley Jr. (10)	FedExForum; 18,119	47–22
70	March 25	@ Washington	L 94–107	Mike Conley Jr. (23)	Zach Randolph (7)	Mike Conley Jr. (7)	Verizon Center; 17,868	47–23
71	March 27	@ New York	L 101–108	Mike Conley Jr. (26)	Tony Allen (10)	Mike Conley Jr. (6)	Madison Square Garden; 19,033	47–24
72	March 29	Houston	W 103–94	Zach Randolph (21)	Zach Randolph (12)	Mike Conley Jr. (10)	FedExForum; 18,119	48–24
73	March 30	@ Minnesota	W 99–86	Marc Gasol (21)	Marc Gasol (8)	Jerryd Bayless (7)	Target Center; 13,680	49–24

April : 7–2 (home: 3–1; road: 4–1)

Game	Date	Team	Score	High points	High rebounds	High assists	Location Attendance	Record
74	April 1	San Antonio	W 92–90	Mike Conley Jr. (23)	Zach Randolph (10)	Prince & Gasol (4)	FedExForum; 16,642	50–24
75	April 3	@ Portland	W 94–76	Mike Conley Jr. (20)	Ed Davis (10)	Jerryd Bayless (7)	Rose Garden; 19,275	51–24
76	April 5	@ L. A. Lakers	L 84–86	Mike Conley Jr. (21)	Marc Gasol (8)	Marc Gasol (7)	Staples Center; 18,997	51–25
77	April 7	@ Sacramento	W 89–87	Mike Conley Jr. (25)	Marc Gasol (10)	Conley & Gasol (4)	Power Balance Pavilion; 15,205	52–25
78	April 9	Charlotte	W 94–75	Mike Conley Jr. (20)	Zach Randolph (13)	Mike Conley Jr. (7)	FedExForum; 16,591	53–25
79	April 12	@ Houston	W 82–78	Randolph & Gasol (15)	Marc Gasol (12)	Conley & Gasol (5)	Toyota Center; 18,163	54–25
80	April 13	L. A. Clippers	L 87–91	Marc Gasol (18)	Marc Gasol (15)	Marc Gasol (7)	FedExForum; 18,119	54–26
81	April 15	@ Dallas	W 103–97	Jerryd Bayless (19)	Ed Davis (11)	Marc Gasol (6)	American Airlines Center; 19,833	55–26
82	April 17	Utah	W 86–70	Zach Randolph (25)	Zach Randolph (19)	Mike Conley Jr. (5)	FedExForum; 16,777	56–26

2012–13 season schedule

== Playoffs ==
=== Game log ===
2013 playoff game log
First Round: 4–2 (home: 3–0; road: 1–2)

Game	Date	Team	Score	High points	High rebounds	High assists	Location Attendance	Series
1	April 20	@ L.A. Clippers	L 91–112	Jerryd Bayless (19)	Ed Davis (6)	Marc Gasol (7)	Staples Center; 19,373	0–1
2	April 22	@ L.A. Clippers	L 91–93	Mike Conley Jr. (28)	Tony Allen (10)	Mike Conley Jr. (9)	Staples Center; 19,373	0–2
3	April 25	L.A. Clippers	W 94–82	Zach Randolph (27)	Zach Randolph (11)	Mike Conley Jr. (10)	FedExForum; 18,119	1–2
4	April 27	L.A. Clippers	W 104–83	Gasol, Randolph (24)	Marc Gasol (13)	Mike Conley Jr. (13)	FedExForum; 18,119	2–2
5	April 30	@ L.A. Clippers	W 103–93	Zach Randolph (25)	Zach Randolph (11)	Mike Conley Jr. (6)	Staples Center; 19,384	3–2
6	May 3	L.A. Clippers	W 118–105	Conley, Randolph (23)	Allen. Gasol (7)	Mike Conley Jr. (7)	FedExForum; 18,119	4–2

Conference Semifinals: 4–1 (home: 2–0; road: 2–1)

Game	Date	Team	Score	High points	High rebounds	High assists	Location Attendance	Series
1	May 5	@ Oklahoma City	L 91–93	Marc Gasol (20)	Zach Randolph (10)	Three Players (3)	Chesapeake Energy Arena; 18,203	0–1
2	May 7	@ Oklahoma City	W 99–93	Mike Conley Jr. (26)	Mike Conley Jr. (10)	Mike Conley Jr. (9)	Chesapeake Energy Arena; 18,203	1–1
3	May 11	Oklahoma City	W 87–81	Marc Gasol (20)	Zach Randolph (10)	Mike Conley Jr. (6)	FedExForum; 18,119	2–1
4	May 13	Oklahoma City	W 103–97 (OT)	Mike Conley Jr. (24)	Zach Randolph (12)	Conley, Prince (5)	FedExForum; 18,119	3–1
5	May 15	@ Oklahoma City	W 88–84	Zach Randolph (28)	Zach Randolph (14)	Mike Conley Jr. (11)	Chesapeake Energy Arena; 18,203	4–1

Conference Finals: 0–4 (home: 0–2; road: 0–2)

Game	Date	Team	Score	High points	High rebounds	High assists	Location Attendance	Series
1	May 19	@ San Antonio	L 83–105	Quincy Pondexter (17)	Gasol, Randolph (7)	Mike Conley Jr. (8)	AT&T Center; 18,581	0–1
2	May 21	@ San Antonio	L 89–93 (OT)	Bayless, Conley (18)	Zach Randolph (18)	Conley, Gasol (4)	AT&T Center; 18,581	0–2
3	May 25	San Antonio	L 93–104 (OT)	Mike Conley Jr. (20)	Zach Randolph (15)	Marc Gasol (5)	FedExForum; 18,119	0–3
4	May 27	San Antonio	L 86–93	Quincy Pondexter (22)	Allen, Randolph (8)	Mike Conley Jr. (7)	FedExForum; 18,119	0–4

2013 playoff schedule

== Player statistics ==
=== Regular season ===
Player	POS	GP	GS	MP	REB	AST	STL	BLK	PTS	MPG	RPG	APG	SPG	BPG	PPG
Marc Gasol	C	80	80	2,796	622	318	80	139	1,127	35.0	7.8	4.0	1.0	1.7	14.1
Mike Conley Jr.	PG	80	80	2,757	225	487	174	24	1,168	34.5	2.8	6.1	2.2	.3	14.6
Jerryd Bayless	PG	80	4	1,765	176	264	59	17	693	22.1	2.2	3.3	.7	.2	8.7
Tony Allen	SG	79	79	2,109	363	98	119	44	705	26.7	4.6	1.2	1.5	.6	8.9
Zach Randolph	PF	76	75	2,607	854	108	61	31	1,169	34.3	11.2	1.4	.8	.4	15.4
Darrell Arthur	PF	59	3	970	169	33	24	33	362	16.4	2.9	.6	.4	.6	6.1
Quincy Pondexter	SF	59	1	1,243	132	61	35	6	375	21.1	2.2	1.0	.6	.1	6.4
Rudy Gay^{†}	SF	42	42	1,541	249	108	56	31	723	36.7	5.9	2.6	1.3	.7	17.2
Wayne Ellington^{†}	SG	40	4	676	52	42	16	1	218	16.9	1.3	1.1	.4	.0	5.5
Marreese Speights^{†}	C	40	2	579	189	18	10	27	262	14.5	4.7	.5	.3	.7	6.6
Tayshaun Prince^{†}	SF	37	36	1,174	155	85	27	12	325	31.7	4.2	2.3	.7	.3	8.8
Ed Davis^{†}	PF	36	4	544	160	8	13	47	185	15.1	4.4	.2	.4	1.3	5.1
Tony Wroten	SG	35	0	272	28	43	8	4	91	7.8	.8	1.2	.2	.1	2.6
Austin Daye^{†}	SF	31	0	328	60	21	9	14	125	10.6	1.9	.7	.3	.5	4.0
Jon Leuer^{†}	PF	19	0	96	24	3	4	0	34	5.1	1.3	.2	.2	.0	1.8
Hamed Haddadi^{†}	C	13	0	87	24	4	1	6	15	6.7	1.8	.3	.1	.5	1.2
Josh Selby	PG	10	0	59	5	4	2	0	20	5.9	.5	.4	.2	.0	2.0
Chris Johnson	SF	8	0	102	11	2	4	0	29	12.8	1.4	.3	.5	.0	3.6
Keyon Dooling	PG	7	0	82	1	8	1	0	31	11.7	.1	1.1	.1	.0	4.4
Dexter Pittman^{†}	C	7	0	20	5	0	0	0	2	2.9	.7	.0	.0	.0	.3

- ^{†} Denotes player spent time with another team in the season. Stats reflect time with the Grizzlies only.

=== Playoffs ===
Player	POS	GP	GS	MP	REB	AST	STL	BLK	PTS	MPG	RPG	APG	SPG	BPG	PPG
Marc Gasol	C	15	15	609	127	48	13	33	258	40.6	8.5	3.2	.9	2.2	17.2
Mike Conley Jr.	PG	15	15	575	71	107	26	5	255	38.3	4.7	7.1	1.7	.3	17.0
Zach Randolph	PF	15	15	554	150	24	10	7	261	36.9	10.0	1.6	.7	.5	17.4
Tayshaun Prince	SF	15	15	454	57	29	7	5	105	30.3	3.8	1.9	.5	.3	7.0
Tony Allen	SG	15	15	422	91	27	30	5	154	28.1	6.1	1.8	2.0	.3	10.3
Quincy Pondexter	SF	15	0	357	38	11	11	2	133	23.8	2.5	.7	.7	.1	8.9
Jerryd Bayless	PG	15	0	320	30	32	7	5	139	21.3	2.0	2.1	.5	.3	9.3
Darrell Arthur	PF	15	0	175	38	6	2	4	58	11.7	2.5	.4	.1	.3	3.9
Keyon Dooling	PG	14	0	114	5	4	1	0	27	8.1	.4	.3	.1	.0	1.9
Ed Davis	PF	8	0	48	11	0	0	1	13	6.0	1.4	.0	.0	.1	1.6
Tony Wroten	SG	6	0	17	4	2	1	0	8	2.8	.7	.3	.2	.0	1.3
Jon Leuer	PF	5	0	11	3	0	1	1	2	2.2	.6	.0	.2	.2	.4
Austin Daye	SF	4	0	20	1	0	0	1	7	5.0	.3	.0	.0	.3	1.8
