= 2013–14 Memphis Grizzlies season =

- Head coach: Dave Joerger
- General manager: Chris Wallace
- Owners: Robert Pera
- Arena: FedExForum

Results
- Record: 50–32 (.610)
- Place: Division: 3rd (Southwest); Conference: 7th (Western)
- Playoff finish: First Round (lost to Thunder 3–4)
- Stats at Basketball Reference

Local media
- Television: Fox Sports Tennessee; Fox Sports Southeast
- Radio: WRBO

The 2013–14 Memphis Grizzlies season was the 19th season of the franchise in the NBA and their 13th in Memphis. It was their first season under new head coach Dave Joerger.

In the playoffs, the Grizzlies faced the Oklahoma City Thunder, the team they defeated in last season's Semifinals in five games, in the First Round and lost in seven games.

== Key dates ==
- June 27: The 2013 NBA draft took place at Barclays Center in Brooklyn, New York.
- February 8: The Grizzlies set an NBA record for fewest free-throws scored by a team in a single game when they shot a single free-throw in a win against the Atlanta Hawks.

== Draft picks ==
Round	Pick	Player	Position	Nationality	School
2	41	Jamaal Franklin	SG	United States	San Diego State

== Roster ==
2013–14 Memphis Grizzlies roster
Players

Pos.	No.	Player	Height	Weight	DOB	From
G/F	9	Tony Allen	6 ft 4 in (1.93 m)	213 lb (97 kg)	1982–01–11	Oklahoma State
G	12	Nick Calathes	6 ft 6 in (1.98 m)	213 lb (97 kg)	1989–02–07	Florida
G	11	Mike Conley Jr.	6 ft 1 in (1.85 m)	185 lb (84 kg)	1987–10–11	Ohio State
F	32	Ed Davis	6 ft 10 in (2.08 m)	225 lb (102 kg)	1989–06–05	North Carolina
G	22	Jamaal Franklin	6 ft 5 in (1.96 m)	191 lb (87 kg)	1991–07–21	San Diego State
C	33	Marc Gasol	7 ft 1 in (2.16 m)	265 lb (120 kg)	1985–01–29	Lausanne Collegiate School (TN)
F	3	James Johnson	6 ft 9 in (2.06 m)	248 lb (112 kg)	1987–02–20	Wake Forest
C	41	Kosta Koufos	7 ft 0 in (2.13 m)	265 lb (120 kg)	1989–02–24	Ohio State
G/F	5	Courtney Lee	6 ft 5 in (1.96 m)	200 lb (91 kg)	1985–10–03	Western Kentucky
F	30	Jon Leuer	6 ft 10 in (2.08 m)	228 lb (103 kg)	1989–05–14	Wisconsin
G/F	13	Mike Miller	6 ft 8 in (2.03 m)	218 lb (99 kg)	1980–02–19	Florida
G/F	20	Quincy Pondexter	6 ft 6 in (1.98 m)	225 lb (102 kg)	1988–03–10	Washington
F	21	Tayshaun Prince	6 ft 9 in (2.06 m)	215 lb (98 kg)	1980–02–28	Kentucky
F	50	Zach Randolph	6 ft 9 in (2.06 m)	260 lb (118 kg)	1981–07–16	Michigan State
G	19	Beno Udrih	6 ft 3 in (1.91 m)	210 lb (95 kg)	1982–07–05	Slovenia

Coaches
Head coach
- Dave Joerger
Assistant(s)
- Elston Turner
- Bob Thornton
- Duane Ticknor
- Shawn Respert

Legend
- (DP) Unsigned draft pick
- (FA) Free agent
- (S) Suspended
- (DL) On assignment to D-League affiliate
- Injured

Roster
Updated: 2014–05–04

== Pre-season ==
2013 pre-season game log
Total: 4–4 (home: 2–2; road: 2–2)
Pre-season: 4–4 (home: 2–2; road: 2–2)

Game	Date	Team	Score	High points	High rebounds	High assists	Location Attendance	Record
1	October 7	@ Chicago	L 87–106	Jerryd Bayless (15)	Jon Leuer & Ed Davis (5)	Nick Calathes (8)	Scottrade Center; 13,497	0–1
2	October 9	Dallas	L 90–95	Jon Leuer (17)	Jon Leuer & Ed Davis (10)	Jon Leuer (5)	FedExForum; 11,459	0–2
3	October 13	Haifa	W 116–70	Tony Allen (19)	Kosta Koufos (12)	Randolph & Franklin (5)	FedExForum; 11,459	1–2
4	October 15	Milwaukee	W 102–99	Quincy Pondexter (24)	Ed Davis (10)	Marc Gasol (7)	FedExForum; 11,164	2–2
5	October 18	@ Orlando	W 97–91	Mike Miller (19)	Mike Miller (11)	Nick Calathes (5)	Amway Center; 13,041	3–2
6	October 20	@ Atlanta	W 90–82	Jerryd Bayless (22)	Ed Davis (8)	Nick Calathes (10)	Philips Arena; 8,731	4–2
7	October 23	@ Toronto	L 72–108	Leuer & Davis (11)	Ed Davis (9)	Marc Gasol (6)	Air Canada Centre; 14,421	4–3
8	October 23	Houston	L 73–92	Marc Gasol (17)	Zach Randolph (10)	Pondexter & Davis (3)	FedExForum; 12,271	4–4

2013–14 season schedule

== Regular season ==
Southwest Division	W	L	PCT	GB	Home	Road	Div	GP
z-San Antonio Spurs	62	20	.756	–	32‍–‍9	30‍–‍11	12–4	82
x-Houston Rockets	54	28	.659	8.0	33‍–‍8	21‍–‍20	11–5	82
x-Memphis Grizzlies	50	32	.610	12.0	27‍–‍14	23‍–‍18	4–12	82
x-Dallas Mavericks	49	33	.598	13.0	26‍–‍15	23‍–‍18	9–7	82
New Orleans Pelicans	34	48	.415	28.0	22‍–‍19	12‍–‍29	4–12	82

Western Conference
#	Team	W	L	PCT	GB	GP
1	z-San Antonio Spurs *	62	20	.756	–	82
2	y-Oklahoma City Thunder *	59	23	.720	3.0	82
3	y-Los Angeles Clippers *	57	25	.695	5.0	82
4	x-Houston Rockets	54	28	.659	8.0	82
5	x-Portland Trail Blazers	54	28	.659	8.0	82
6	x-Golden State Warriors	51	31	.622	11.0	82
7	x-Memphis Grizzlies	50	32	.610	12.0	82
8	x-Dallas Mavericks	49	33	.598	13.0	82
9	Phoenix Suns	48	34	.585	14.0	82
10	Minnesota Timberwolves	40	42	.488	22.0	82
11	Denver Nuggets	36	46	.439	26.0	82
12	New Orleans Pelicans	34	48	.415	28.0	82
13	Sacramento Kings	28	54	.341	34.0	82
14	Los Angeles Lakers	27	55	.329	35.0	82
15	Utah Jazz	25	57	.305	37.0	82

=== Game log ===
2013–14 game log
Total: 50–32 (home: 27–14; road: 23–18)
October: 0–1 (home: 0–0; road: 0–1)

Game	Date	Team	Score	High points	High rebounds	High assists	Location Attendance	Record
1	October 30	@ San Antonio	L 94–101	Mike Conley Jr. (14)	Marc Gasol (9)	Mike Conley Jr. (8)	AT&T Center; 18,581	0–1

November : 8–7 (home: 3–5; road: 5–2)

Game	Date	Team	Score	High points	High rebounds	High assists	Location Attendance	Record
2	November 1	Detroit	W 111–108 (OT)	Tony Allen (22)	Zach Randolph (10)	Marc Gasol (5)	FedExForum; 18,119	1–1
3	November 2	@ Dallas	L 99–111	Mike Conley (24)	Zach Randolph (14)	Mike Conley (8)	American Airlines Center; 20,262	1–2
4	November 4	Boston	W 95–88	Zach Randolph, Mike Conley, & Jerryd Bayless (15)	Marc Gasol (8)	Mike Conley (8)	FedExForum; 15,872	2–2
5	November 6	New Orleans	L 84–99	Mike Conley (26)	Mike Miller (6)	Marc Gasol (4)	FedExForum; 15,209	2–3
6	November 9	Golden State	W 108–90	Zach Randolph (23)	Zach Randolph (11)	Mike Conley (6)	FedExForum; 16,989	3–3
7	November 11	@ Indiana	L 79–95	Marc Gasol (15)	Ed Davis (7)	Nick Calathes (6)	Bankers Life Fieldhouse; 13,130	3–4
8	November 13	Toronto	L 87–103	Mike Conley (29)	Zach Randolph & Marc Gasol (10)	Mike Conley (5)	FedExForum; 15,971	3–5
9	November 15	@ L.A. Lakers	W 89–86	Zach Randolph (28)	Zach Randolph (11)	Marc Gasol (8)	Staples Center; 18,997	4–5
10	November 17	@ Sacramento	W 97–86	Zach Randolph (22)	Zach Randolph (10)	Marc Gasol (9)	Sleep Train Arena; 15,630	5–5
11	November 18	@ L.A. Clippers	W 106–102	Zach Randolph (26)	Zach Randolph (15)	Marc Gasol (8)	Staples Center; 19,060	6–5
12	November 20	@ Golden State	W 88–81 (OT)	Zach Randolph (21)	Zach Randolph (12)	Mike Conley & Marc Gasol (4)	Oracle Arena; 19,596	7–5
13	November 22	San Antonio	L 86–102	Mike Conley (28)	Zach Randolph (10)	Tony Allen (4)	FedExForum; 17,109	7–6
14	November 25	Houston	L 86–93	Tayshaun Prince (16)	Kosta Koufos (13)	Mike Conley (10)	FedExForum; 15,246	7–7
15	November 27	@ Boston	W 100–93	Jerryd Bayless (22)	Kosta Koufos (13)	Mike Conley (9)	TD Garden; 17,319	8–7
16	November 30	Brooklyn	L 88–97	Quincy Pondexter (22)	Kosta Koufos (11)	Mike Conley (10)	FedExForum; 17,012	8–8

December : 5–9 (home: 4–6; road: 1–3)

Game	Date	Team	Score	High points	High rebounds	High assists	Location Attendance	Record
17	December 3	Phoenix	W 110–91	Jon Leuer (23)	Ed Davis (12)	Mike Conley (13)	FedExForum; 15,069	9–8
18	December 5	L.A. Clippers	L 81–101	Kosta Koufos (17)	Zach Randolph (12)	Quincy Pondexter (5)	FedExForum; 15,112	9–9
19	December 7	Golden State	L 82–108	Mike Miller (16)	Kosta Koufos (16)	Zach Randolph (4)	FedExForum; 15,088	9–10
20	December 9	Orlando	W 94–85	Zach Randolph (19)	Zach Randolph (12)	Nick Calathes (8)	FedExForum; 13,511	10–10
21	December 11	Oklahoma City	L 100–116	Mike Conley (20)	Zach Randolph (8)	Mike Conley (9)	FedExForum; 16,345	10–11
22	December 13	@ New Orleans	L 98–104	Jon Leuer (19)	Zach Randolph (10)	Mike Conley (7)	New Orleans Arena; 15,516	10–12
23	December 15	Minnesota	L 93–101	Mike Conley (28)	Zach Randolph (12)	Zach Randolph (5)	FedExForum; 15,417	10–13
24	December 17	L.A. Lakers	L 92–96	Zach Randolph (18)	Zach Randolph (16)	Zach Randolph (5)	FedExForum; 17,217	10–14
25	December 18	@ Dallas	L 91–105	Tony Allen (16)	Tony Allen (11)	Jerryd Bayless (6)	American Airlines Center; 19,425	10–15
26	December 21	@ New York	W 95–87	Zach Randolph (25)	Zach Randolph (15)	Mike Conley (8)	Madison Square Garden; 19,812	11–15
27	December 23	Utah	W 104–94	Zach Randolph (22)	Zach Randolph (10)	Zach Randolph (7)	FedExForum; 16,665	12–15
28	December 26	@ Houston	L 92–100	Zach Randolph (23)	Zach Randolph (17)	Mike Conley (6)	Toyota Center; 18,201	12–16
29	December 28	Denver	W 120–99	Zach Randolph (20)	Kosta Koufos (12)	James Johnson (6)	FedExForum; 17,017	13–16
30	December 30	Chicago	L 91–95	Mike Conley (26)	Zach Randolph (10)	Mike Conley (9)	FedExForum; 17,688	13–17

January : 12–3 (home: 5–2; road: 7–1)

Game	Date	Team	Score	High points	High rebounds	High assists	Location Attendance	Record
31	January 2	@ Phoenix	W 99–91	Zach Randolph (20)	Zach Randolph (15)	Mike Conley (6)	US Airways Center; 14,844	14–17
32	January 3	@ Denver	L 108–111	Zach Randolph (25)	Zach Randolph (13)	Mike Conley (8)	Pepsi Center; 17,608	14–18
33	January 5	@ Detroit	W 112–84	Jon Leuer (23)	Zach Randolph (16)	Mike Conley (6)	The Palace of Auburn Hills; 14,134	15–18
34	January 7	San Antonio	L 108–110 (OT)	Mike Conley (30)	Jon Leuer (9)	Mike Conley & James Johnson (5)	FedExForum; 15,916	15–19
35	January 10	Phoenix	W 104–99	Mike Conley (31)	Ed Davis (17)	Zach Randolph (7)	FedExForum; 15,916	16–19
36	January 12	Atlanta	W 108–101	Mike Conley (21)	Zach Randolph (12)	Mike Conley (13)	FedExForum; 16,841	17–19
37	January 14	Oklahoma City	W 90–87	Courtney Lee (24)	Zach Randolph (13)	Mike Conley (7)	FedExForum; 17,177	18–19
38	January 15	@ Milwaukee	W 82–77	Mike Conley (15)	Ed Davis (9)	Mike Conley (5)	BMO Harris Bradley Center; 11,379	19–19
39	January 17	Sacramento	W 91–90	Mike Conley (25)	Zach Randolph (9)	Mike Conley (6)	FedExForum; 17,212	20–19
40	January 20	New Orleans	L 92–95	Zach Randolph (23)	Zach Randolph (20)	Marc Gasol (4)	FedExForum; 17,485	20–20
41	January 24	@ Houston	W 88–87	Courtney Lee (19)	Zach Randolph (8)	James Johnson (5)	Toyota Center; 16,998	21–20
42	January 25	Houston	W 99–81	Mike Conley (17)	Zach Randolph (17)	James Johnson (8)	FedExForum; 17,512	22–20
43	January 28	@ Portland	W 98–81	Zach Randolph (23)	Zach Randolph (10)	Mike Conley (7)	Moda Center; 19,385	23–20
44	January 29	@ Sacramento	W 99–89	Mike Conley (27)	Zach Randolph (7)	Mike Conley (10)	Sleep Train Arena; 15,195	24–20
45	January 31	@ Minnesota	W 94–90	Zach Randolph (26)	Zach Randolph (12)	Mike Conley (8)	Target Center; 17,429	25–20

February : 7–5 (home: 5–1; road: 2–4)

Game	Date	Team	Score	High points	High rebounds	High assists	Location Attendance	Record
46	February 1	Milwaukee	W 99–90	Zach Randolph (23)	Zach Randolph (10)	Courtney Lee (7)	FedExForum; 17,017	26–20
47	February 3	@ Oklahoma City	L 77–86	Zach Randolph (13)	Zach Randolph (13)	Tayshaun Prince (5)	Chesapeake Energy Arena; 18,203	26–21
48	February 5	Dallas	L 96–110	Zach Randolph (25)	Zach Randolph (9)	Marc Gasol (5)	FedExForum; 16,188	26–22
49	February 8	@ Atlanta	W 79–76	Zach Randolph (20)	Marc Gasol (8)	Marc Gasol (7)	Philips Arena; 15,190	27–22
50	February 9	@ Cleveland	L 83–91 (OT)	Nick Calathes (17)	Marc Gasol (9)	Nick Calathes (6)	Quicken Loans Arena; 16,484	27–23
51	February 11	Washington	W 92–89	Marc Gasol & Nick Calathes (18)	Zach Randolph (10)	Nick Calathes (6)	FedExForum; 15,613	28–23
52	February 12	@ Orlando	W 86–81	Zach Randolph (20)	Courtney Lee (6)	Nick Calathes (6)	Amway Center; 15,310	29–23
All-Star Break
53	February 18	New York	W 98–93	Mike Conley (22)	Zach Randolph (8)	Nick Calathes (5)	FedExForum; 17,317	30–23
54	February 20	L.A. Clippers	W 102–96	Zach Randolph (21)	Zach Randolph (11)	Mike Conley (6)	FedExForum; 17,963	31–23
55	February 22	@ Charlotte	L 89–92	Mike Conley (16)	Zach Randolph (11)	Mike Conley (5)	Time Warner Cable Arena; 18,317	31–24
56	February 26	L.A. Lakers	W 108–103	Courtney Lee (18)	Marc Gasol (12)	Marc Gasol (5)	FedExForum; 16,989	32–24
57	February 28	@ Oklahoma City	L 107–113	Mike Miller (19)	Zach Randolph (10)	Mike Conley (9)	Chesapeake Energy Arena; 18,203	32–25

March : 12–5 (home: 6–0; road: 6–5)

Game	Date	Team	Score	High points	High rebounds	High assists	Location Attendance	Record
58	March 1	Cleveland	W 110–96	Zach Randolph (23)	Zach Randolph (14)	Mike Conley (7)	FedExForum; 17,011	33–25
59	March 3	@ Washington	W 110–104	Tayshaun Prince (21)	Zach Randolph (10)	Marc Gasol (8)	Verizon Center; 14,065	34–25
60	March 5	@ Brooklyn	L 94–103	Jon Leuer (19)	Kosta Koufos (8)	Nick Calathes (5)	Barclays Center; 17,053	34–26
61	March 7	@ Chicago	W 85–77	Marc Gasol (18)	Zach Randolph (11)	Mike Conley (7)	United Center; 21,318	35–26
62	March 8	Charlotte	W 111–89	Mike Conley (20)	Kosta Koufos (10)	Allen & Conley (4)	FedExForum; 17,298	36–26
63	March 11	Portland	W 109–99	Marc Gasol (19)	Zach Randolph (12)	Nick Calathes (9)	FedExForum; 17,391	37–26
64	March 12	@ New Orleans	W 90–88	Mike Conley (16)	Gasol & Randolph (9)	Nick Calathes (7)	Smoothie King Center; 16,513	38–26
65	March 14	@ Toronto	L 86–99	Zach Randolph (16)	Calathes & Randolph (8)	Mike Conley (6)	Air Canada Centre; 18,465	38–27
66	March 15	@ Philadelphia	W 103–77	Mike Conley (19)	Ed Davis (11)	Gasol & Calathes (6)	Wells Fargo Center; 15,164	39–27
67	March 19	Utah	W 96–86	Zach Randolph (21)	Zach Randolph (11)	Mike Conley (7)	FedExForum; 17,011	40–27
68	March 21	@ Miami	L 86–91	Zach Randolph (25)	Zach Randolph (14)	Mike Conley (6)	American Airlines Arena; 20,007	40–28
69	March 22	Indiana	W 82–71	Mike Conley (21)	Zach Randolph (13)	Mike Conley (4)	FedExForum; 18,119	41–28
70	March 24	Minnesota	W 109–92	Mike Conley (23)	Marc Gasol (12)	Mike Conley (6)	FedExForum; 17,784	42–28
71	March 26	@ Utah	W 91–87	Zach Randolph (22)	Zach Randolph (13)	Mike Conley (6)	EnergySolutions Arena; 19,081	43–28
72	March 28	@ Golden State	L 93–100	Zach Randolph (21)	Gasol & Randolph (7)	Mike Conley (6)	Oracle Arena; 19,596	43–29
73	March 30	@ Portland	L 98–105	Zach Randolph (21)	Zach Randolph (7)	Mike Conley (9)	Moda Center; 19,994	43–30
74	March 31	@ Denver	W 94–92	Zach Randolph (20)	Zach Randolph (11)	Randolph, Calathes & Lee (3)	Pepsi Center; 14,570	44–30

April : 6–2 (home: 4–0; road: 2–2)

Game	Date	Team	Score	High points	High rebounds	High assists	Location Attendance	Record
75	April 2	@ Minnesota	L 88–102	Marc Gasol (18)	Marc Gasol (7)	Mike Conley (8)	Target Center; 12,009	44–31
76	April 4	Denver	W 100–92	Marc Gasol (24)	Zach Randolph (15)	Randolph & Conley (4)	FedExForum; 17,011	45–31
77	April 6	@ San Antonio	L 92–112	James Johnson (20)	Gasol & Randolph (6)	Mike Conley Jr. (6)	AT&T Center; 18,581	45–32
78	April 9	Miami	W 107–102	Mike Conley Jr. (26)	Marc Gasol (14)	Mike Conley Jr. (6)	FedExForum; 18,119	46–32
79	April 11	Philadelphia	W 117–95	Marc Gasol (21)	Zach Randolph (11)	Mike Conley Jr. (8)	FedExForum; 17,456	47–32
80	April 13	@ L.A. Lakers	W 102–90	Mike Conley Jr. (24)	Marc Gasol (15)	Mike Conley Jr. (8)	Staples Center; 18,997	48–32
81	April 14	@ Phoenix	W 97–91	Zach Randolph (32)	Zach Randolph (9)	Mike Conley Jr. (7)	US Airways Center; 18,422	49–32
82	April 16	Dallas	W 106–105 (OT)	Zach Randolph (27)	Zach Randolph (14)	Marc Gasol (9)	FedExForum; 17,323	50–32

2013–14 season schedule

== Playoffs ==
=== Game log ===
2014 playoff game log
Total: 3–4(home: 1–2; road: 2–2)
First Round: 3–4 (home: 1–2; road: 2–2)

Game	Date	Team	Score	High points	High rebounds	High assists	Location Attendance	Series
1	April 19	@ Oklahoma City	L 86–100	Zach Randolph (21)	Zach Randolph (11)	Mike Conley Jr. (11)	Chesapeake Energy Arena; 18,203	0–1
2	April 21	@ Oklahoma City	W 111–105 (OT)	Zach Randolph (25)	Tony Allen (8)	Mike Conley (12)	Chesapeake Energy Arena; 18,203	1–1
3	April 24	Oklahoma City	W 98–95 (OT)	Mike Conley Jr. (20)	Zach Randolph (10)	Zach Randolph (6)	FedExForum; 18,119	2–1
4	April 26	Oklahoma City	L 89–92 (OT)	Marc Gasol (23)	Tony Allen (13)	Mike Conley Jr. (10)	FedExForum; 18,119	2–2
5	April 29	@ Oklahoma City	W 100–99 (OT)	Mike Miller (21)	Marc Gasol (15)	Gasol, Lee & Conley (4)	Chesapeake Energy Arena; 18,203	3–2
6	May 1	Oklahoma City	L 84–104	Marc Gasol (17)	Zach Randolph (8)	Mike Conley Jr. (6)	FedExForum; 18,119	3–3
7	May 3	@ Oklahoma City	L 109–120	Marc Gasol (24)	Jon Leuer (7)	Mike Conley Jr. (9)	Chesapeake Energy Arena; 18,203	3–4

2014 playoff schedule

== Player statistics ==
=== Ragular season ===
Player	POS	GP	GS	MP	REB	AST	STL	BLK	PTS	MPG	RPG	APG	SPG	BPG	PPG
Mike Miller	SF	82	4	1,707	207	130	26	5	579	20.8	2.5	1.6	.3	.1	7.1
Kosta Koufos	C	80	22	1,349	418	39	32	71	514	16.9	5.2	.5	.4	.9	6.4
Zach Randolph	PF	79	79	2,705	795	200	54	23	1,372	34.2	10.1	2.5	.7	.3	17.4
Tayshaun Prince	SF	76	76	1,948	234	119	39	19	454	25.6	3.1	1.6	.5	.3	6.0
Mike Conley Jr.	PG	73	73	2,446	213	441	110	13	1,256	33.5	2.9	6.0	1.5	.2	17.2
Nick Calathes	SG	71	7	1,173	137	207	66	8	347	16.5	1.9	2.9	.9	.1	4.9
Ed Davis	PF	63	4	956	260	27	17	43	357	15.2	4.1	.4	.3	.7	5.7
Marc Gasol	C	59	59	1,970	424	215	59	76	859	33.4	7.2	3.6	1.0	1.3	14.6
Tony Allen	SG	55	28	1,278	208	94	90	19	495	23.2	3.8	1.7	1.6	.3	9.0
James Johnson	SF	52	4	956	166	111	42	57	384	18.4	3.2	2.1	.8	1.1	7.4
Courtney Lee^{†}	SG	49	47	1,469	138	83	45	19	540	30.0	2.8	1.7	.9	.4	11.0
Jon Leuer	PF	49	0	642	158	20	18	13	302	13.1	3.2	.4	.4	.3	6.2
Jerryd Bayless^{†}	PG	31	5	650	59	66	20	5	250	21.0	1.9	2.1	.6	.2	8.1
Jamaal Franklin	SG	21	0	161	23	6	4	2	39	7.7	1.1	.3	.2	.1	1.9
Quincy Pondexter	SG	15	2	270	26	20	5	1	94	18.0	1.7	1.3	.3	.1	6.3
Beno Udrih^{†}	SG	10	0	55	2	6	1	1	27	5.5	.2	.6	.1	.1	2.7
Darius Morris^{†}	PG	5	0	66	8	8	3	0	15	13.2	1.6	1.6	.6	.0	3.0
Seth Curry^{†}	PG	1	0	4	0	0	0	0	0	4.0	.0	.0	.0	.0	.0

- ^{†} Denotes player spent time with another team in the season. Stats reflect time with the Grizzlies only.

=== Playoffs ===
Player	POS	GP	GS	MP	REB	AST	STL	BLK	PTS	MPG	RPG	APG	SPG	BPG	PPG
Marc Gasol	C	7	7	299	54	31	12	6	121	42.7	7.7	4.4	1.7	.9	17.3
Mike Conley Jr.	PG	7	7	267	32	55	14	1	111	38.1	4.6	7.9	2.0	.1	15.9
Courtney Lee	SG	7	7	224	14	11	5	2	70	32.0	2.0	1.6	.7	.3	10.0
Tayshaun Prince	SF	7	6	113	10	6	1	0	21	16.1	1.4	.9	.1	.0	3.0
Tony Allen	SG	7	1	230	54	10	12	1	86	32.9	7.7	1.4	1.7	.1	12.3
Mike Miller	SF	7	1	173	26	9	6	0	51	24.7	3.7	1.3	.9	.0	7.3
Beno Udrih	SG	7	0	115	12	12	3	0	55	16.4	1.7	1.7	.4	.0	7.9
Kosta Koufos	C	7	0	45	15	2	2	3	18	6.4	2.1	.3	.3	.4	2.6
Ed Davis	PF	7	0	25	15	0	1	3	6	3.6	2.1	.0	.1	.4	.9
Zach Randolph	PF	6	6	234	52	14	5	1	109	39.0	8.7	2.3	.8	.2	18.2
James Johnson	SF	3	0	28	6	0	1	0	19	9.3	2.0	.0	.3	.0	6.3
Jon Leuer	PF	3	0	23	8	2	1	0	9	7.7	2.7	.7	.3	.0	3.0
Jamaal Franklin	SG	2	0	4	1	0	0	0	1	2.0	.5	.0	.0	.0	.5
