= Mike Conley (basketball) =

American basketball player (born 1987)

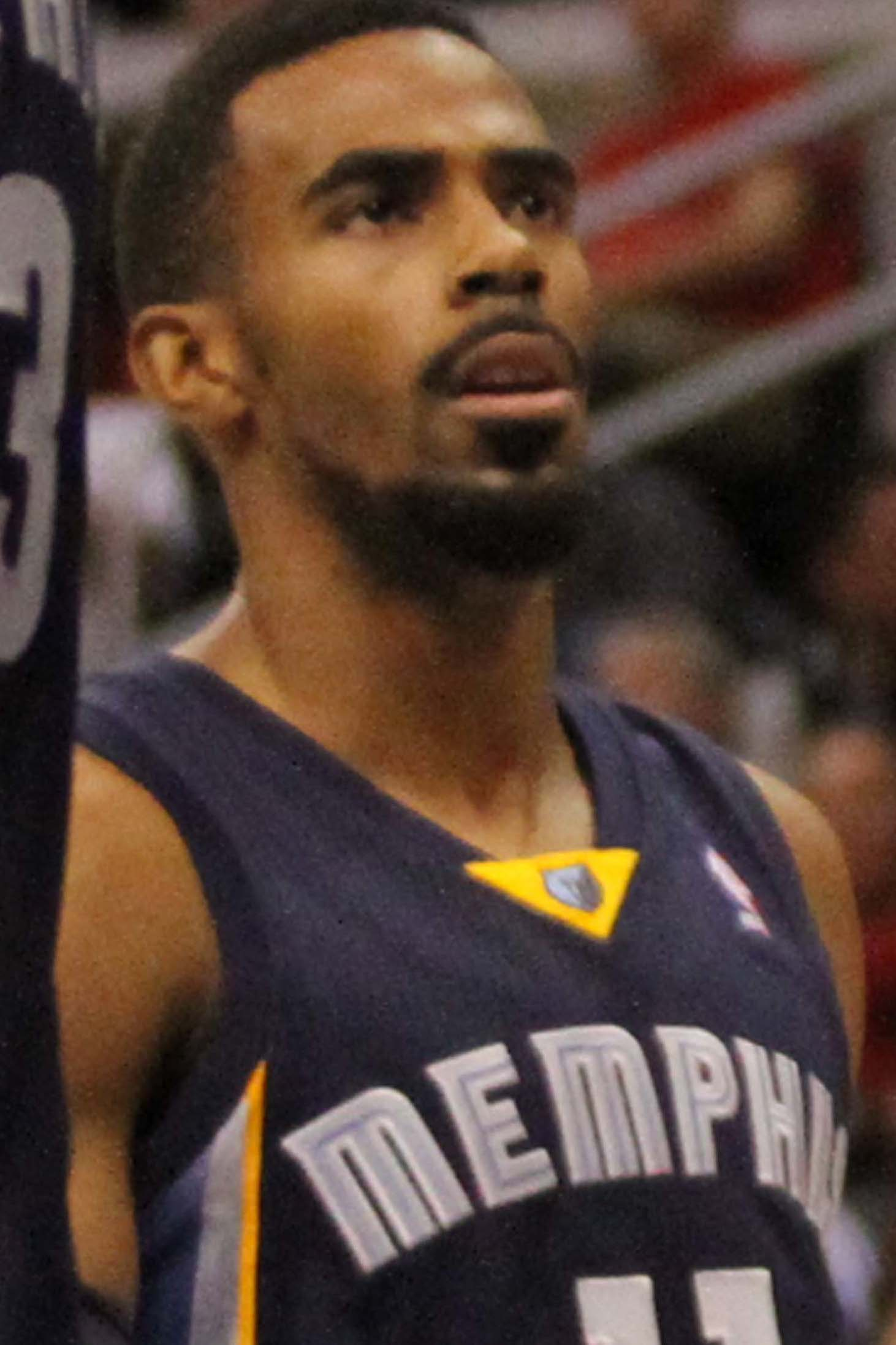
- Conley with the Memphis Grizzlies in 2013

No. 45 – Boston Celtics
- Position: Point guard
- League: NBA

Personal information
- Born: October 11, 1987 (age 39) Fayetteville, Arkansas, U.S.
- Listed height: 6 ft 0 in (1.83 m)
- Listed weight: 182 lb (83 kg)

Career information
- High school: Lawrence North (Indianapolis, Indiana)
- College: Ohio State (2006–2007)
- NBA draft: 2007: 1st round, 4th overall pick
- Drafted by: Memphis Grizzlies
- Playing career: 2007–present

Career history
- 2007–2019: Memphis Grizzlies
- 2019–2023: Utah Jazz
- 2023–2026: Minnesota Timberwolves
- 2026–present: Boston Celtics

Career highlights
- NBA All-Star (2021); NBA All-Defensive Second Team (2013); First-team All-Big Ten (2007); McDonald's All-American (2006); Third-team Parade All-American (2006)
- Stats at NBA.com
- Stats at Basketball Reference

Michael Alexander Conley Jr. (born October 11, 1987) is an American professional basketball player for the Boston Celtics of the National Basketball Association (NBA). He was drafted as the fourth overall pick in the 2007 NBA draft by the Memphis Grizzlies.

Mike Conley Jr. played basketball for Lawrence North High School in Indianapolis. Conley played alongside Greg Oden, a future Ohio State teammate and NBA first-overall draft pick. The duo won three state championships and 103 games during their four years at high school. Conley spent 12 seasons with the Grizzlies and became the team's all-time leading scorer before being traded to the Utah Jazz in 2019, where he would make his first All-Star Game in 2021, before being traded again to the Minnesota Timberwolves in 2023, where he played for three seasons. Conley has the most NBA Sportsmanship Awards of all time, with four selections. On July 7, 2026, Conley signed with the Boston Celtics.

== College career ==
In his freshman year at Ohio State, Conley averaged 11.3 points and led the Big Ten Conference in assists with 6.1 per game. Conley and fellow freshman star Greg Oden led the Buckeyes to a Big Ten conference championship and a runner-up finish in the NCAA Tournament.

On the road to the championship game, the Buckeyes defeated Central Connecticut State, Xavier, Tennessee, Memphis, and Georgetown. They lost the championship game to the repeat national champion Florida. Conley's best performance in the tournament was in the game against Xavier. He recorded 21 points, 4 assists, 2 steals, and 3 blocks as Ohio State defeated the Musketeers in overtime. Oden fouled out in regulation, and Conley scored 11 of his 21 points in the extra period.

Ending the season with totals of 441 points and 238 assists, Conley was named to the All-Big Ten First Team.

After his freshman year, Conley announced his intention to enter the 2007 NBA draft, as did Oden. To preserve his eligibility to withdraw from the draft, he initially did not sign with an agent, but he signed with his father several weeks before the draft.

== Professional career ==
=== Memphis Grizzlies (2007–2019) ===
==== 2007–2010: early years ====
Conley joined fellow Buckeyes Greg Oden and Daequan Cook in declaring for the 2007 NBA draft; both Conley and Oden were represented by Conley's father, whom the NBA certified as an agent earlier in the year. The Memphis Grizzlies drafted Conley as the fourth overall pick after Oden, Kevin Durant, and Al Horford.

Conley had his first major appearances in January 2008. In his first five career games, he scored 5, 10, 11, 11, and 15 points, respectively. He scored a season-high 20 points with 7 assists in a 134–124 loss to the Cleveland Cavaliers. Conley finished his rookie year with averages of 9.4 points and 4.2 assists per game.

Conley started his sophomore campaign competing with Kyle Lowry for minutes. On January 25, 2009, the Grizzlies made Lionel Hollins the head coach after Marc Iavaroni was fired. On February 19, 2009, Lowry was traded to the Houston Rockets, which put Conley in the starting lineup. He averaged 10.8 points and 4.3 assists per game for the year.

Conley cemented his role as a full-time starter for the Grizzlies in 2009. He posted a season high of 25 points on March 31, 2010, during a 106–102 loss to the Dallas Mavericks. He averaged 12.0 points and 5.3 assists on the season.

==== 2010–2014: All-Defensive Team selection and Conference finals ====
On November 30, 2010, Conley put up a season-high 28 points in a 98–96 victory over the Los Angeles Lakers. He averaged 13.7 and 6.5 assists on the year to help the Grizzlies make the playoffs for the first time in five years. Entering with the eighth seed in the Western Conference, they defeated the top-seeded San Antonio Spurs in six games in the first round, making NBA history as only the second eighth-seeded team to defeat a first seed in a seven-game series. They then lost to the Oklahoma City Thunder in seven games in the semifinals.

In the shortened lockout season, Conley played 62 of the Grizzlies' 66 games, during which he averaged 12.7 points and 6.5 assists. The Grizzlies made the playoffs but fell in the first round to the Los Angeles Clippers in seven games.

That year, Conley averaged 14.6 points, 6.1 assists, and 2.8 rebounds per game as the Grizzlies made the playoffs once again. They eliminated the Los Angeles Clippers and the Oklahoma City Thunder to reach the Western Conference Finals for the first time in franchise history. They then lost to the San Antonio Spurs in four games. Conley was named to the NBA All-Defensive Second Team for the first time.

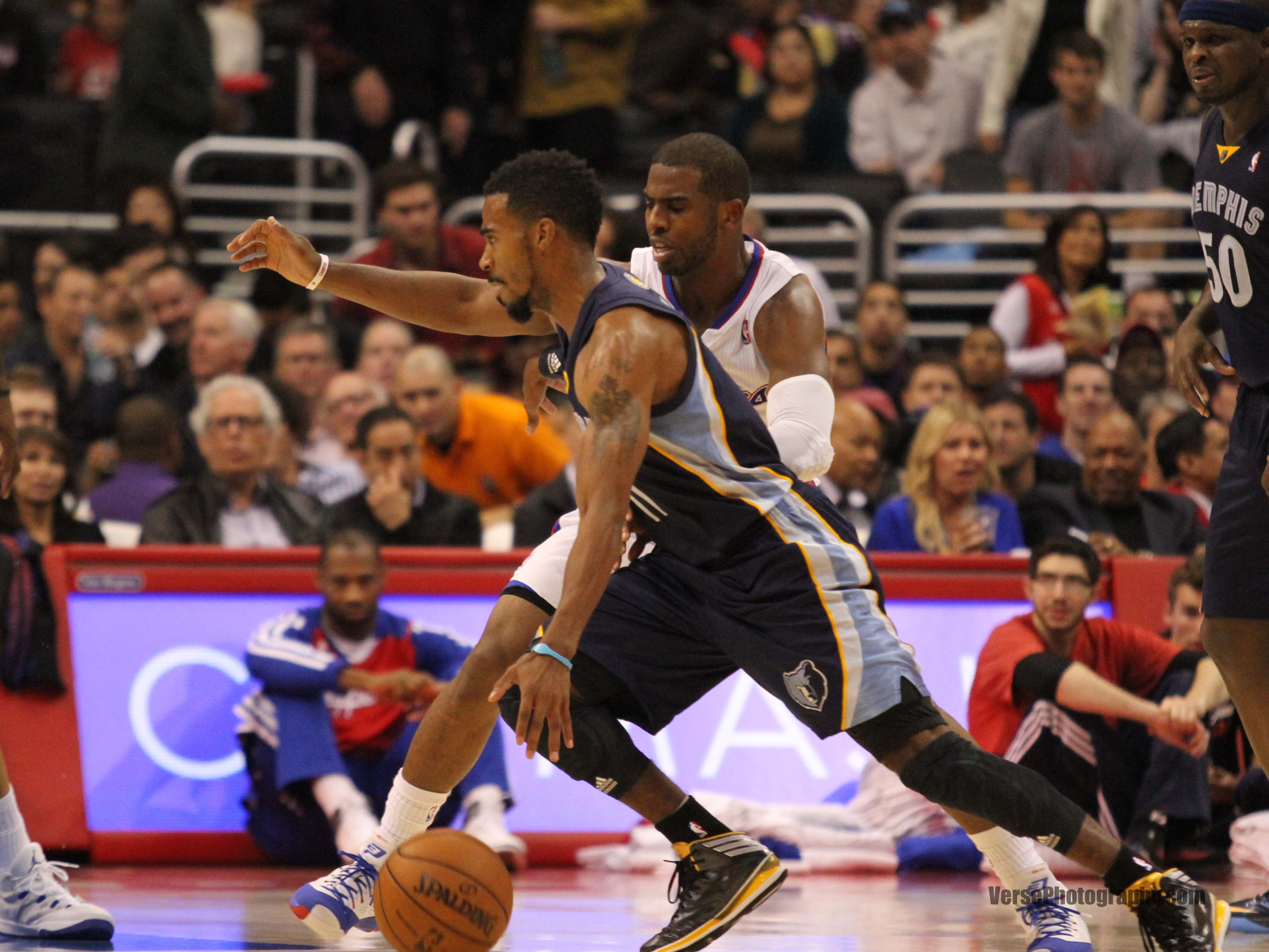
Conley driving past Chris Paul in a game in November 2013

Conley averaged a career-high 17.2 points, 6.0 assists, and 2.9 rebounds per game on the year as the Grizzles made the playoffs for the fourth consecutive season. They were eliminated in the first round by the Oklahoma City Thunder in a seven-game series. Conley received the NBA Sportsmanship Award.

==== 2014–2019: playoff disappointment ====
On December 13, 2014, Conley scored a career-high 36 points to help the Grizzlies defeat the Philadelphia 76ers, 120–115, in overtime. The Grizzlies finished the season as the fifth seed in the Western Conference, making the playoffs once again. They defeated the Portland Trail Blazers in the first round in five games. Near the end of game 3, Conley suffered a facial fracture, which forced him to miss the rest of the first round. He also missed game 1 of the semifinals against the Golden State Warriors. Conley returned in game 2 of the series and, while wearing a protective mask, scored 21 points to lead Memphis to a victory. Memphis eventually lost to the Warriors in six games.

In 2014, Conley received what would have been the first technical foul of his NBA career, but it was overturned by league officials the next day; as of May 2025 he has yet to record a technical in over 34,000 minutes played, having by far the longest streak without one of any NBA player.

On October 31, 2015, Conley surpassed Shareef Abdur-Rahim (7,801) for third on the Grizzlies' career scoring list. He scored 22 points against the Brooklyn Nets to finish the game with 7,821 career points. On January 18, 2016, Conley returned to the lineup after missing six games with a sore left Achilles and recorded his third double-double of the season with 15 points and 10 assists, helping the Grizzlies defeat the New Orleans Pelicans 101–99. Earlier that day, he was named one of the 30 finalists for the 2016 U.S. Olympic team. On March 12, he was ruled out for three to four weeks with a left foot injury. He was later ruled out for the rest of the season on April 4 after a reevaluation by team doctors, and hoped to return for the playoffs. The injury-riddled Grizzlies finished seventh in the Western Conference, and without Conley and Marc Gasol, were swept by the San Antonio Spurs in the first round of the playoffs. On April 23, Conley received the NBA Sportsmanship Award for the second time.

On July 14, 2016, Conley re-signed with the Grizzlies. His reported five-year, $153 million deal was the greatest contract by total value in NBA history at the time. On November 16, 2016, he scored 30 points and hit a career-high-tying seven three-pointers in a 111–107 win over the Los Angeles Clippers. On November 29, he was ruled out for six to eight weeks with a fractured vertebra. He returned to action on December 16 after missing nine games. In the Grizzlies' 96–92 loss to the Sacramento Kings, Conley passed Pau Gasol to become the all-time leading scorer in Grizzlies history. On January 30, 2017, he scored 38 points in a 115–98 win over the Phoenix Suns. Conley matched his career best with seven three-pointers (in 10 attempts) and made 12 of 18 shots overall in his fourth 30-point game of the season—he previously had five over his entire career. On February 15 against New Orleans, Conley passed Mike Miller for the most three-pointers in franchise history with 845. On March 29, he matched his career-high with seven three-pointers on his way to 36 points, helping the Grizzlies rout the Indiana Pacers, 110–97.

On April 22, 2017, Conley scored a franchise postseason record 35 points in a 110–108 overtime win over the Spurs. The win tied the first-round series at 2–2.

Conley appeared in 12 of the Grizzlies' first 13 games of the 2017–18 season before suffering a left Achilles injury. On January 27, 2018, he was ruled out for the rest of the season after requiring surgery to smooth a small bone protrusion in his left heel.

In the Grizzlies' season opener on October 17, 2018, Conley made his first regular season appearance since November 2017 after missing 70 games. He played nearly 29 minutes, scored 11 points, and had three assists and one steal in a 111–83 loss to the Indiana Pacers. On November 2, he scored a season-high 28 points in a 110–100 win over the Utah Jazz. On November 10, he set a new season high with 32 points in a 112–106 overtime win over the Philadelphia 76ers. On November 30, Conley improved his season-high scoring to 37 points and also made 10 assists in a 131–125 double-overtime win over the Brooklyn Nets. On March 5, 2019, he scored a career-high 40 points in a Grizzlies' 120–111 win over the Portland Trail Blazers. He was scoreless in the first quarter and scored 19 points in the fourth. On March 11, he was named Western Conference Player of the Week for games played from March 4 to March 10. It marked his first career Player of the Week award. On March 27, in a 118–103 loss to the Golden State Warriors, Conley passed Marc Gasol to become the Grizzlies' all-time leader in career points.

=== Utah Jazz (2019–2023) ===
==== 2019–2021: first All-Star selection ====
On July 6, 2019, Conley was traded to the Utah Jazz in exchange for Grayson Allen, Jae Crowder, Kyle Korver, the draft rights to Darius Bazley, and a protected first-round pick. He made his Jazz debut on October 23, recording five points and five assists in a 100–95 win over the Thunder. On October 30, he scored a season-high 29 points, alongside five assists and two steals, in a 110–96 win over the Los Angeles Clippers. In 2020, due to the suspension of the NBA season because of the COVID-19 pandemic, the NBA produced a televised event in which NBA and WNBA players participated in a virtual H–O–R–S–E competition while quarantining at their respective homes. The NBA raised $200,000 for charities as Conley won the first virtual NBA H–O–R–S–E Competition, becoming the inaugural "H.O.R.S.E Champion".

On August 21, 2020, during the first round of the playoffs, Conley recorded 27 points and a playoff career-high seven 3-pointers in a 124–87 win over the Denver Nuggets in Game 3. He had missed the first two games of the series after being quarantined. Two days later, Conley logged 26 points, four assists and two steals in a 129–127 win in Game 4. Despite taking a 3–1 series lead, the Jazz lost in seven games to the Nuggets. After the 2019–20 season, Conley declined to exercise the early termination option on his contract, and was owed $34.5 million in the fifth and final year of his contract in 2020–21.

On January 1, 2021, Conley scored a season-high 33 points and added seven assists, two rebounds, and one steal in a 106–100 win over the Clippers. He was named an All-Star for the first time in his career as it was announced that he would be a reserve for the 2021 NBA All-Star Game, replacing the injured Devin Booker. His 14-year wait is the longest ever for a first time All-Star. He recorded three points, one rebound, and two assists in 12 minutes in the game. Conley was also announced as Booker's replacement in the Three-Point Contest, where he competed against teammate Donovan Mitchell. Conley lost in the final round to Stephen Curry, 28–27.

On May 29, during the first round of the playoffs, Conley scored 27 points and matched his playoff career-high of seven 3-pointers in a 121–111 win over the Grizzlies in game 3. He missed the first five games of the Jazz's second-round series versus the Los Angeles Clippers due to a strained right hamstring. Conley returned to the lineup in game 6, logging five points and three assists in a 131–119 loss that eliminated the Jazz from the playoffs.

==== 2021–2023: first-round exit and roster retool ====
On August 6, 2021, Conley re-signed with the Jazz on a reported three-year, $72.5 million contract. On November 2, he scored a season-high 30 points in a 119–113 win over the Sacramento Kings. The Jazz were eliminated in the first round of the playoffs by the Dallas Mavericks, with Conley averaging only 9.2 points and 4.8 assists per game during the 2–4 series defeat.

After the 2021–22 season, the Jazz retooled, trading away their franchise players, All-Stars Donovan Mitchell and Rudy Gobert. Conley said he expected to be moved: "I was just like everybody else. I was waiting to get the phone call that I was going somewhere else." But he stayed in Utah to start off the 2022–23 season. Conley made his season debut on October 19, recording 13 points, eight assists and two steals in a 123–102 win over the Nuggets. Before being traded to Minnesota he averaged nearly 11 points per game.

=== Minnesota Timberwolves (2023–2026) ===
On February 9, 2023, Conley was traded to the Minnesota Timberwolves in a three-team trade involving the Los Angeles Lakers, with the Jazz acquiring Russell Westbrook, Juan Toscano-Anderson, and Damian Jones, the Lakers acquiring Jarred Vanderbilt, Malik Beasley, and D'Angelo Russell, and the Timberwolves acquiring Conley and Nickeil Alexander-Walker; the trade reunited Conley with his former Grizzlies teammate Kyle Anderson and Jazz teammate Rudy Gobert. He made his Timberwolves debut a day later, recording nine points, three assists and two steals in a 128–107 loss to the Grizzlies. On February 23, 2024, he signed a contract extension through the 2025–26 season and on May 1, he was again named NBA Teammate of the Year.

On February 3, 2026, Conley was traded to the Chicago Bulls as part of a three team trade that also included the Detroit Pistons. The next day, Conley and Coby White were traded to the Charlotte Hornets in exchange for Ousmane Dieng, Collin Sexton and multiple second-round draft picks. On February 5, he was waived by the Hornets. Upon clearing waivers, Conley officially re-signed with the Timberwolves on February 17.

=== Boston Celtics (2026–present) ===
On July 7, 2026, Conley signed a one-year, $3.9 million contract with the Boston Celtics.

== Career statistics ==
Legend
| GP | Games played | GS | Games started | MPG | Minutes per game |
| FG% | Field goal percentage | 3P% | 3-point field goal percentage | FT% | Free throw percentage |
| RPG | Rebounds per game | APG | Assists per game | SPG | Steals per game |
| BPG | Blocks per game | PPG | Points per game | **Bold** | Career high |
| * | Led the league |

=== NBA ===
==== Regular season ====
| Year | Team | GP | GS | MPG | FG% | 3P% | FT% | RPG | APG | SPG | BPG | PPG |
|---|---|---|---|---|---|---|---|---|---|---|---|---|
| 2007–08 | Memphis | 53 | 46 | 26.1 | .428 | .330 | .732 | 2.6 | 4.2 | .8 | .0 | 9.4 |
| 2008–09 | Memphis | **82*** | 61 | 30.6 | .442 | .406 | .817 | 3.4 | 4.3 | 1.1 | .1 | 10.9 |
| 2009–10 | Memphis | 80 | 80 | 32.1 | .445 | .387 | .743 | 2.4 | 5.3 | 1.4 | .2 | 12.0 |
| 2010–11 | Memphis | 81 | **81** | **35.5** | .444 | .369 | .733 | 3.0 | 6.5 | 1.8 | .2 | 13.7 |
| 2011–12 | Memphis | 62 | 61 | 35.1 | .433 | .377 | .861 | 2.5 | 6.5 | **2.2** | .2 | 12.7 |
| 2012–13 | Memphis | 80 | 80 | 34.5 | .440 | .362 | .830 | 2.8 | 6.1 | **2.2** | **.3** | 14.6 |
| 2013–14 | Memphis | 73 | 73 | 33.5 | .450 | .361 | .815 | 2.9 | 6.0 | 1.5 | .2 | 17.2 |
| 2014–15 | Memphis | 70 | 70 | 31.8 | .446 | .386 | .859 | 3.0 | 5.4 | 1.3 | .2 | 15.8 |
| 2015–16 | Memphis | 56 | 56 | 31.4 | .422 | .363 | .834 | 2.9 | 6.1 | 1.2 | **.3** | 15.3 |
| 2016–17 | Memphis | 69 | 68 | 33.2 | .459 | .407 | .859 | **3.5** | 6.3 | 1.3 | **.3** | 20.5 |
| 2017–18 | Memphis | 12 | 12 | 31.1 | .381 | .312 | .803 | 2.3 | 4.1 | 1.0 | **.3** | 17.1 |
| 2018–19 | Memphis | 70 | 70 | 33.5 | .438 | .364 | .845 | 3.4 | 6.4 | 1.3 | **.3** | **21.1** |
| 2019–20 | Utah | 47 | 41 | 29.0 | .409 | .375 | .827 | 3.2 | 4.4 | .8 | .1 | 14.4 |
| 2020–21 | Utah | 51 | 51 | 29.4 | .444 | .412 | .852 | **3.5** | 6.0 | 1.4 | .2 | 16.2 |
| 2021–22 | Utah | 72 | 72 | 28.6 | .435 | .408 | .796 | 3.0 | 5.3 | 1.3 | **.3** | 13.7 |
| 2022–23 | Utah | 43 | 42 | 29.7 | .408 | .362 | .813 | 2.5 | **7.7** | 1.0 | .2 | 10.7 |
| 2022–23 | Minnesota | 24 | 24 | 31.4 | **.460** | .420 | .863 | 3.1 | 5.0 | 1.2 | .2 | 14.0 |
| 2023–24 | Minnesota | 76 | 76 | 28.9 | .457 | **.442** | **.911** | 2.9 | 5.9 | 1.2 | .2 | 11.4 |
| 2024–25 | Minnesota | 71 | 64 | 24.7 | .400 | .410 | .900 | 2.6 | 4.5 | 1.1 | .2 | 8.2 |
| 2025–26 | Minnesota | 54 | 15 | 18.4 | .335 | .337 | .900 | 1.7 | 2.9 | .6 | .3 | 4.5 |
| Career | | 1,226 | 1,143 | 30.7 | .436 | .387 | .826 | 2.9 | 5.5 | 1.3 | .2 | 13.6 |
| All-Star | | 1 | 0 | 12.3 | .167 | .200 | — | 1.0 | 2.0 | 1.0 | .0 | 3.0 |

==== Playoffs ====
| Year | Team | GP | GS | MPG | FG% | 3P% | FT% | RPG | APG | SPG | BPG | PPG |
|---|---|---|---|---|---|---|---|---|---|---|---|---|
| 2011 | Memphis | 13 | 13 | 39.0 | .388 | .297 | .830 | 3.8 | 6.4 | 1.1 | .2 | 15.2 |
| 2012 | Memphis | 7 | 7 | **39.5** | .421 | .500 | .750 | 3.3 | 7.1 | .9 | .0 | 14.1 |
| 2013 | Memphis | **15** | **15** | 38.3 | .384 | .281 | .763 | **4.7** | 7.1 | 1.7 | .3 | 17.0 |
| 2014 | Memphis | 7 | 7 | 38.1 | .431 | .111 | .769 | 4.6 | **7.9** | **2.0** | .1 | 15.9 |
| 2015 | Memphis | 8 | 8 | 30.4 | .427 | .303 | .821 | 1.1 | 5.0 | 1.4 | .0 | 14.4 |
| 2017 | Memphis | 6 | 6 | 37.3 | .485 | .447 | .838 | 3.3 | 7.0 | 1.7 | **.5** | **24.7** |
| 2020 | Utah | 5 | 5 | 33.0 | .484 | **.529** | .864 | 2.8 | 5.2 | 1.6 | **.5** | 19.8 |
| 2021 | Utah | 6 | 6 | 29.3 | .426 | .486 | **1.000** | 3.5 | 7.7 | .2 | .2 | 15.3 |
| 2022 | Utah | 6 | 6 | 29.0 | .333 | .200 | .800 | 3.2 | 4.8 | .8 | .3 | 9.2 |
| 2023 | Minnesota | 5 | 5 | 36.6 | .476 | .455 | .909 | 2.6 | 6.4 | .6 | .0 | 12.0 |
| 2024 | Minnesota | **15** | **15** | 31.6 | .428 | .395 | .714 | 3.9 | 5.7 | 1.4 | .2 | 11.6 |
| 2025 | Minnesota | **15** | **15** | 23.7 | .302 | .333 | .923 | 2.9 | 3.3 | .6 | .2 | 6.0 |
| 2026 | Minnesota | 12 | 5 | 14.0 | **.500** | .500 | **1.000** | 1.3 | 2.7 | .7 | .0 | 4.4 |
| Career | | 120 | 113 | 31.6 | .412 | .367 | .809 | 3.2 | 5.7 | 1.1 | .2 | 12.9 |

=== College ===
| Year | Team | GP | GS | MPG | FG% | 3P% | FT% | RPG | APG | SPG | BPG | PPG |
|---|---|---|---|---|---|---|---|---|---|---|---|---|
| 2006–07 | Ohio State | 39 | 39 | 31.6 | .518 | .304 | .694 | 3.4 | 6.1 | 2.2 | .3 | 11.3 |
| Career | | 39 | 39 | 31.6 | .518 | .304 | .694 | 3.4 | 6.1 | 2.2 | .3 | 11.3 |

== Personal life ==
Conley is a Christian and has spoken about his faith, saying, "Jesus means the world. Jesus means everything."

Conley's father is Mike Conley Sr., an Olympic gold and silver medalist in the triple jump. He is also the nephew of former American football linebacker Steve Conley.

On July 5, 2014, Conley married Mary Peluso, whom he met at Ohio State. They have three sons.

On September 18, 2024, while Conley was in Minneapolis for a Minnesota Vikings home game, his home was targeted by burglars.

Conley and Trey Alexander are cousins.

== See also ==
- 2006 high school boys basketball All-Americans
- List of NBA franchise career scoring leaders
- List of NBA career assists leaders
- List of NBA career steals leaders
- List of NBA career 3-point scoring leaders
