= Zach Randolph =

American basketball player (born 1981)

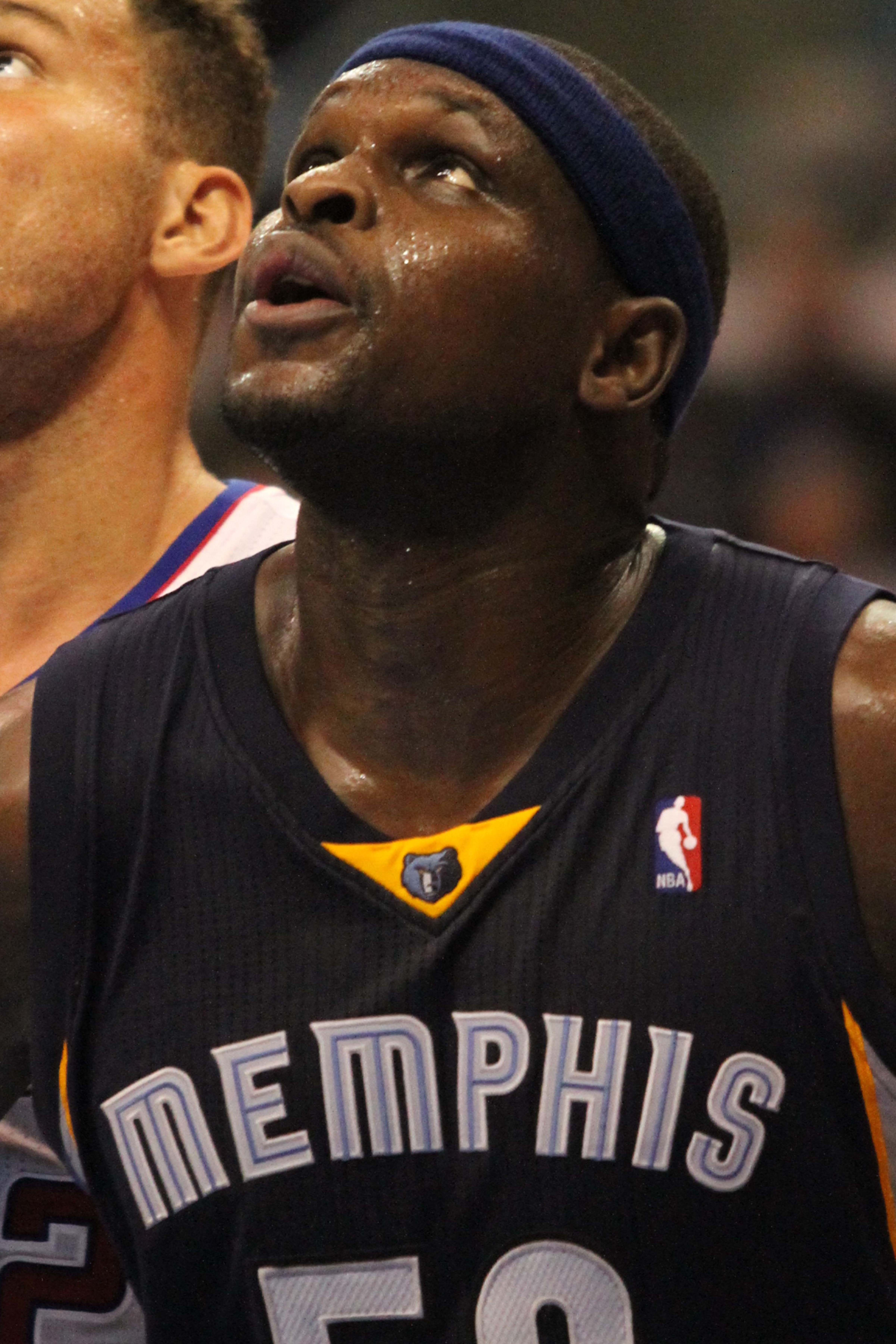
- Randolph with the Memphis Grizzlies in 2013

Personal information
- Born: July 16, 1981 (age 45) Marion, Indiana, U.S.
- Listed height: 6 ft 9 in (2.06 m)
- Listed weight: 250 lb (113 kg)

Career information
- High school: Marion (Marion, Indiana)
- College: Michigan State (2000–2001)
- NBA draft: 2001: 1st round, 19th overall pick
- Drafted by: Portland Trail Blazers
- Playing career: 2001–2019
- Position: Power forward / center
- Number: 50

Career history
- 2001–2007: Portland Trail Blazers
- 2007–2008: New York Knicks
- 2008–2009: Los Angeles Clippers
- 2009–2017: Memphis Grizzlies
- 2017–2019: Sacramento Kings

Career highlights
- 2× NBA All-Star (2010, 2013); All-NBA Third Team (2011); NBA Most Improved Player (2004); No. 50 retired by Memphis Grizzlies; First-team Parade All-American (2000); McDonald's All-American MVP (2000)

Career statistics
- Points: 18,578 (16.6 ppg)
- Rebounds: 10,208 (9.1 rpg)
- Assists: 2,049 (1.8 apg)
- Stats at NBA.com
- Stats at Basketball Reference

Zachary McKenley Randolph (born July 16, 1981) is an American former professional basketball player. Nicknamed "Z-Bo", the 2-time NBA All-Star played college basketball for the Michigan State Spartans before being drafted in the 2001 NBA draft by the Portland Trail Blazers. He played for five teams over the course of his professional career, winning the NBA Most Improved Player award with the Portland Trail Blazers and making the All-NBA Third Team in 2011 with the Memphis Grizzlies. He also played with the New York Knicks, Los Angeles Clippers and Sacramento Kings before retiring in December 2019.

== High school career ==
Randolph grew up in Marion, Indiana, and attended Marion High School, where his coach was Moe Smedley. As a sophomore, he helped lead the Marion Giants to the 1998 Indiana Class 4A Championship Game. As a senior, he again led his team to the state championship game in which Marion High School won its seventh state basketball championship. He finished second in Indiana's "Mr. Basketball" voting that year behind Jared Jeffries, who played for the team the Giants beat in the state championship game and would later become Randolph's teammate with the Knicks. During the 2000 McDonald's All-American Game, Randolph was named MVP, finishing with 23 points and 15 rebounds.

== College career ==
After high school, Randolph attended and played basketball for Michigan State University coached by Tom Izzo. His teammates at MSU included Jason Richardson and Charlie Bell. In his single season at Michigan State, he averaged 10.8 points and 6.7 rebounds per game over 33 games, with a team that finished with a 28–5 record and advanced to its third straight NCAA Final Four. After his freshman season, he entered the 2001 NBA draft.

== Professional career ==
=== Portland Trail Blazers (2001–2007) ===
He was drafted by the Blazers in the first round (19th overall) in 2001. Continuing on from his college career, he remained in the power forward position. Randolph's tenure on the Trail Blazers proved tumultuous, and included off-court incidents such as being arrested for underage drinking in 2002 and on-court incidents such as punching teammate Ruben Patterson after arguing with teammate Qyntel Woods in 2003. Randolph was not the only member of the Trail Blazers with well-documented outbursts, as the team's reputation as being full of trouble makers was so notable that they were dubbed the Jail Blazers.

In the 2003 NBA Playoffs, Randolph averaged 13.9 points and 8.7 rebounds in a seven-game series loss to the Dallas Mavericks, during which he twice recorded the highest single game rebound totals of any players on either team. In 2004, he won the NBA's Most Improved Player award, after which he signed a 6-year, $84-million extension with the Blazers.

Randolph averaged 23.6 points and 10.1 rebounds per game in the 2006–07 season, which was cut short in March 2007 due to a hand injury. In what would turn out to be his final game as a Trail Blazer, he accumulated a career high 43 points and 17 rebounds. In his six seasons with Portland, he averaged 16.0 points and 7.7 rebounds per game.

=== New York Knicks (2007–2008) ===
On June 28, 2007, Randolph, along with Dan Dickau, Fred Jones and the draft rights to Demetris Nichols, was traded to the New York Knicks in a draft day deal for Steve Francis, Channing Frye, and a 2008 2nd-round draft pick. On July 2, 2007, Randolph was introduced at a press conference in New York, where he revealed he would wear the jersey #50. He played 69 games with the Knicks during the 2007–08 season, averaging a double-double, with 17.6 points and 10.3 rebounds per game. Randolph then played only 11 games in New York the next year, before being traded to the Clippers early in the 2008–09 season. In his time in New York, Randolph averaged 18.0 points and 10.6 rebounds per game.

=== Los Angeles Clippers (2008–2009) ===
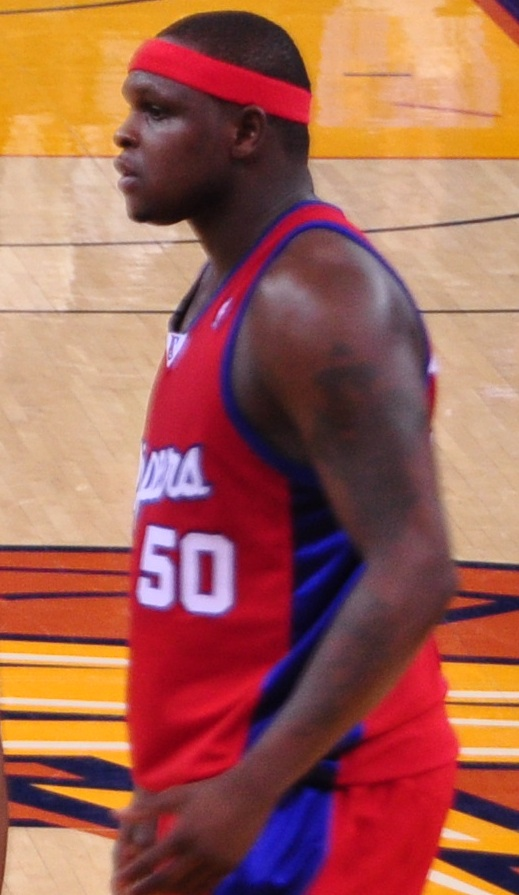
Randolph with the Clippers in 2009

On November 21, 2008, after playing 11 games with the Knicks in the 2008–09 season, Randolph was traded to the Los Angeles Clippers along with Mardy Collins in exchange for Cuttino Mobley and Tim Thomas. During a game against the Phoenix Suns on February 17, 2009, Randolph was ejected, and subsequently suspended two games, for punching Louis Amundson in the jaw. Randolph finished the 2008–09 season with the Clippers before being traded again. In his 39 games with the Clippers, he averaged 20.9 points and 9.4 rebounds per game.

=== Memphis Grizzlies (2009–2017) ===
On July 17, 2009, he was traded to the Memphis Grizzlies in exchange for Quentin Richardson. Randolph was selected for his first NBA All Star Game in 2010 and helped the Grizzlies improve despite failing to make it to the 2010 playoffs.

The Grizzlies made the playoffs in 2011 as the eighth seed and eliminated the top-seeded San Antonio Spurs in the first round, just the second time the eighth seed defeated the first seed since the league expanded to a seven-game first-round series. The series marked the first four wins in franchise playoff history for the Grizzlies and the first time the franchise won a playoff series. In the decisive sixth game, Randolph scored a then playoff career-high 31 points, including 17 in the fourth quarter.

On April 18, 2011, Randolph agreed to a four-year extension with the Grizzlies worth $71 million, with $66 million guaranteed. Later, Randolph was named to the All-NBA Third Team for the first time in his career.

Randolph then led the Grizzlies to an opening game win in their second-round playoff series, posting a playoff-career-high 34 points as the Grizzlies defeated the Oklahoma City Thunder 114–101; however, the Grizzlies fell in the second round after losing game 7 to the Thunder, 105–90.

In 2012, Randolph and the Grizzlies faced the Los Angeles Clippers in the first round of the playoffs. The Grizzlies lost the series in seven games.

Randolph was named to his second All-Star game during the 2012–13 season. On May 15, 2013, Randolph helped lead the Grizzlies to victory over Oklahoma City to advance for the first time in franchise history to the Western Conference Finals. In the close out game against the Thunder, Randolph scored a team-high 28 points and grabbed 14 rebounds.

In the Western Conference Finals, the Grizzlies were swept in four games by the San Antonio Spurs.

In the 2013–14 season, the Grizzlies finished as the seventh seed in the West. Their first round playoff match-up was once again Kevin Durant and the Oklahoma City Thunder. The Grizzlies went on to lose the series in seven games. Randolph was suspended for Game 7 after punching Steven Adams in the jaw midway through the fourth quarter of game 6.

On June 30, 2014, Randolph exercised his player option for the 2014–15 season and signed a two-year, $20 million contract extension with the Grizzlies. The Grizzlies advanced past Portland in the first round of the playoffs, but fell to eventual NBA champions, the Golden State Warriors, in the Conference Semifinals.

On March 19, 2016, Randolph recorded his first career triple-double with 28 points, 11 rebounds, and 10 assists in a 113–102 win over the Los Angeles Clippers. The Grizzlies again qualified for the playoffs in 2016, but were swept out of the first round by the San Antonio Spurs.

On November 2, 2016, in a win over the New Orleans Pelicans, Randolph passed Pau Gasol (3,324) to become the Grizzlies' all-time leader in made field goals. On November 23, 2016, in a win over the Philadelphia 76ers, Randolph passed Vlade Divac for 46th on the NBA's all-time leading rebounding list. On December 6, 2016, he played in his 1,000th career game, becoming the 121st NBA player to reach that mark. He returned to the team to face the Philadelphia 76ers after missing seven games following the death of his mother, Mae, on November 24. On January 6, 2017, Randolph scored 27 points off the bench in a 128–119 overtime win over the Golden State Warriors. It was his highest total scored off the bench since 2006. On January 28, 2017, Randolph scored a season-high 28 points in a 102–95 win over the Utah Jazz.

=== Sacramento Kings (2017–2019) ===
On July 10, 2017, Randolph signed a two-year, $24 million contract with the Sacramento Kings. Prior to Randolph's signing with the Kings, the Grizzlies announced that #50 would never be worn again by another Grizzly, and would eventually be retired in the future. On December 8, 2017, he recorded a season-high 35 points and 13 rebounds in a 116–109 overtime win over the New Orleans Pelicans. He made two of his career-high five 3-pointers to start overtime. On December 20, 2017, Randolph had 21 points and eight rebounds against the Brooklyn Nets, surpassing 10,000 career rebounds.

Randolph fell out of the rotation in 2018–19 due to the Kings' youth movement and the arrival of rookie Marvin Bagley III. He did not play for the team in his second season with the Kings and was later traded, along with Justin Jackson, to the Dallas Mavericks in exchange for Harrison Barnes on February 6, 2019. After acquiring Randolph, the Mavericks' president of basketball operations Donnie Nelson said that there were no expectations for Randolph playing for the team, and he was waived by the Mavericks two days later.

Randolph's final NBA game was played on March 19, 2018, in a 90–106 loss to the Detroit Pistons where he recorded 4 points, 3 assists and 2 rebounds as the Kings' starting Center.

=== Retirement ===
On December 27, 2019, Randolph announced his retirement from professional basketball. In a ceremony at FedExForum on December 11, 2021, Randolph's #50 jersey was retired by the Memphis Grizzlies, the team with which he enjoyed his greatest success. It marked the first time the franchise has retired a number.

== Career statistics ==
Legend
GP	Games played	GS	Games started	MPG	Minutes per game
FG%	Field goal percentage	3P%	3-point field goal percentage	FT%	Free throw percentage
RPG	Rebounds per game	APG	Assists per game	SPG	Steals per game
BPG	Blocks per game	PPG	Points per game	**Bold**	Career high

=== NBA ===
==== Regular season ====
Year	Team	GP	GS	MPG	FG%	3P%	FT%	RPG	APG	SPG	BPG	PPG
2001–02	Portland	41	0	5.8	.449	.000	.667	1.7	.3	.2	.1	2.8
2002–03	Portland	77	11	16.9	**.513**	.000	.758	4.5	.5	.5	.2	8.4
2003–04	Portland	**81**	80	**37.9**	.485	.200	.761	10.5	2.0	.8	**.5**	20.1
2004–05	Portland	46	37	34.8	.448	.000	.815	9.6	1.9	.7	.4	18.9
2005–06	Portland	74	71	34.4	.436	.291	.714	8.0	1.9	.8	.2	18.0
2006–07	Portland	68	67	35.7	.467	.292	.819	10.1	2.2	.8	.2	**23.6**
2007–08	New York	69	68	32.5	.459	.275	.772	10.3	2.0	.9	.2	17.6
2008–09	New York	11	11	35.3	.434	.292	**.821**	**12.5**	1.4	**1.2**	.3	20.5
2008–09	L.A. Clippers	39	34	35.1	.487	.342	.701	9.4	2.3	.8	.3	20.9
2009–10	Memphis	**81**	**81**	37.7	.488	.288	.778	11.7	1.8	1.0	.4	20.8
2010–11	Memphis	75	74	36.3	.503	.186	.758	12.2	2.2	.8	.3	20.1
2011–12	Memphis	28	8	26.3	.463	.250	.659	8.0	1.7	.8	.1	11.6
2012–13	Memphis	76	75	34.3	.460	.087	.750	11.2	1.4	.8	.4	15.4
2013–14	Memphis	79	79	34.2	.467	.100	.742	10.1	**2.5**	.7	.3	17.4
2014–15	Memphis	71	71	32.5	.487	**.350**	.765	10.5	2.2	1.0	.2	16.1
2015–16	Memphis	68	53	29.6	.475	.231	.796	7.8	2.1	.6	.2	15.3
2016–17	Memphis	73	5	24.5	.449	.223	.731	8.2	1.7	.5	.1	14.1
2017–18	Sacramento	59	57	25.6	.473	.347	.785	6.7	2.2	.7	.2	14.5
Career		1,116	882	31.0	.471	.273	.764	9.1	1.8	.7	.3	16.6
All-Star		2	0	16.0	.438	.000	.000	5.5	1.0	1.0	.0	7.0

==== Playoffs ====
Year	Team	GP	GS	MPG	FG%	3P%	FT%	RPG	APG	SPG	BPG	PPG
2002	Portland	1	0	1.0	.000	.000	.000	.0	.0	.0	.0	.0
2003	Portland	7	4	29.3	**.525**	.000	**.892**	8.7	1.6	.4	.3	13.9
2011	Memphis	13	13	**39.6**	.446	**.250**	.821	**10.8**	**2.4**	**1.1**	**.8**	**22.2**
2012	Memphis	7	7	35.4	.420	.000	.629	9.9	.9	1.0	.6	13.7
2013	Memphis	**15**	**15**	36.9	.460	.000	.670	10.0	1.6	.7	.5	17.4
2014	Memphis	6	6	39.0	.404	.000	.610	8.7	2.3	.8	.2	18.2
2015	Memphis	11	11	34.7	.423	.200	.879	8.5	2.1	.5	.0	15.6
2016	Memphis	4	4	30.0	.371	.000	.857	8.8	1.8	.3	.0	13.0
2017	Memphis	6	4	31.8	.422	.143	.727	8.2	.7	.8	.3	13.2
Career		70	64	35.0	.437	.154	.750	9.3	1.7	.7	.4	16.5

=== College ===
Year	Team	GP	GS	MPG	FG%	3P%	FT%	RPG	APG	SPG	BPG	PPG
2000–01	Michigan State	33	8	19.8	.587	.000	.635	6.7	1.0	.7	.7	10.8

== See also ==
- List of NBA franchise career scoring leaders
- List of NBA career rebounding leaders
