= Jon Leuer =

American basketball player (born 1989)

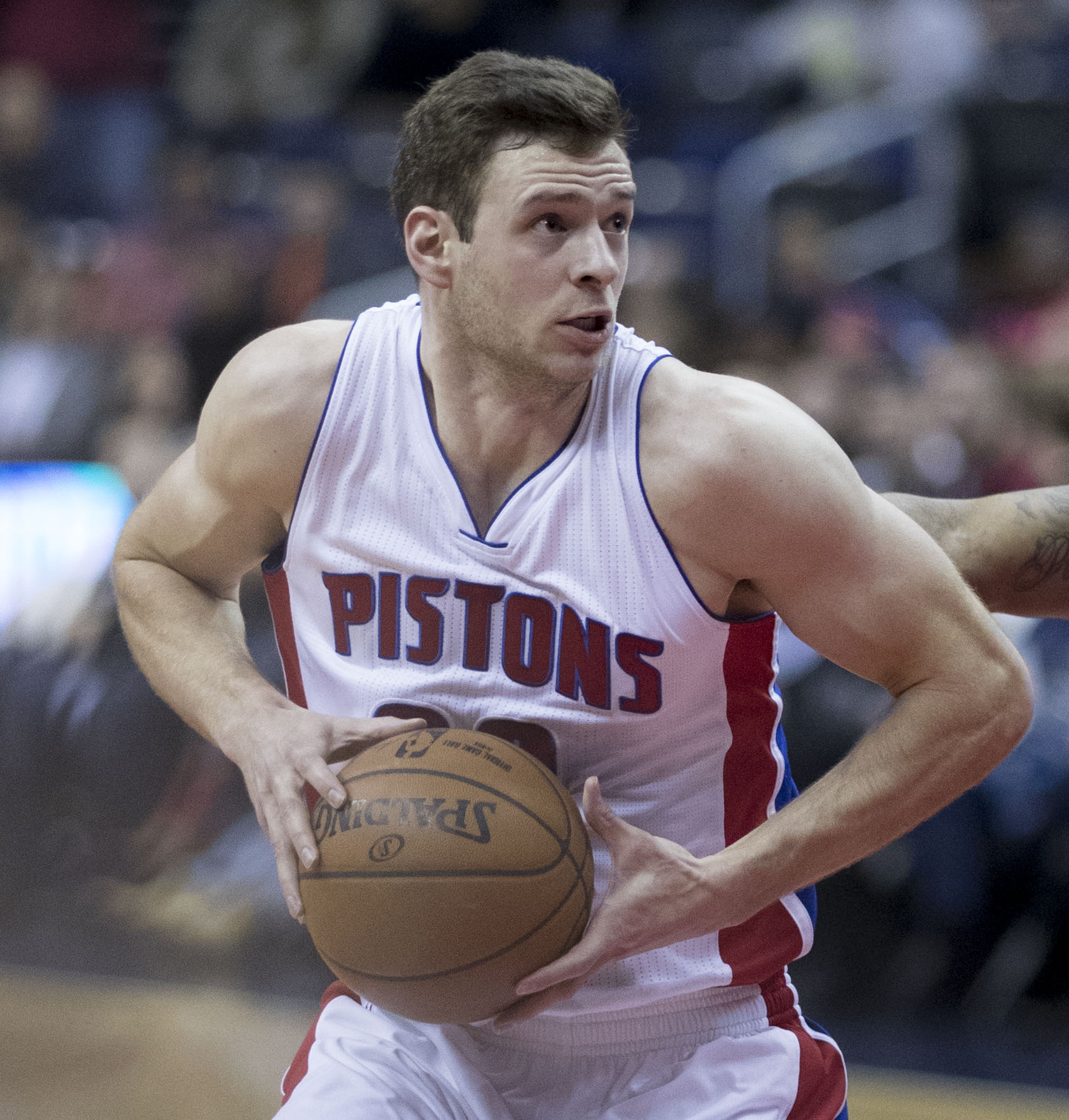
- Leuer with the Detroit Pistons in 2016

Personal information
- Born: May 14, 1989 (age 37) Long Lake, Minnesota, U.S.
- Listed height: 6 ft 10 in (2.08 m)
- Listed weight: 228 lb (103 kg)

Career information
- High school: Orono (Long Lake, Minnesota)
- College: Wisconsin (2007–2011)
- NBA draft: 2011: 2nd round, 40th overall pick
- Drafted by: Milwaukee Bucks
- Playing career: 2011–2019
- Position: Power forward / center
- Number: 30

Career history
- 2011: Skyliners Frankfurt
- 2011–2012: Milwaukee Bucks
- 2012–2013: Cleveland Cavaliers
- 2012–2013: →Canton Charge
- 2013–2015: Memphis Grizzlies
- 2015–2016: Phoenix Suns
- 2016–2019: Detroit Pistons

Career highlights
- AP Honorable mention All-American (2011); First-team All-Big Ten – Coaches (2011); Second-team All-Big Ten – Media (2011)
- Stats at NBA.com
- Stats at Basketball Reference

Jon Leuer (born May 14, 1989) is an American former professional basketball player. He was selected by the Milwaukee Bucks with the 40th overall pick in the 2011 NBA draft. During his National Basketball Association (NBA) career, he also played for the Cleveland Cavaliers, Memphis Grizzlies, Phoenix Suns, and Detroit Pistons.

== High school career ==
Leuer was born in Long Lake, Minnesota and attended Orono High School in Long Lake, where he was ranked the 82nd-best college recruit in the nation from the class of 2007. One scouting report read: "At 6-foot-10, 228-pounds, Leuer definitely needs some time to fill out his frame for high-major competition. Nonetheless, he is a pure shooter with good overall skills with the ball. He can knock down a jump hook and can play off the dribble. He moves well up and down the court, but has a ways to go defensively and as a rebounder. Could be an impact player with his size and unique skill set if he does get stronger."

Another one stated: "Flew under the radar prior to the spring of 2006. Excellent player from behind the stripe, especially when you consider that he pushes 6 ft 1 in. Face up four man will need to add strength to reach his potential. Could be an Andrew Brackman type of forward."

In his junior year, he averaged 18 points and 8 rebounds per game and earned honorable mention all-state and first-team all-conference honors. He averaged 23.2 points and 12.0 rebounds per game as a senior and was selected to Minnesota State All-star game while landing second-team all-state and first-team all-conference honors. He ended up with 35 double digit scoring games and a career high of 37.

He played AAU basketball with the Minnesota Magic. Leuer had originally entered high school as a guard, but had a 10-inch growth spurt before his senior year.

== College career ==
=== Freshman season (2007–2008) ===
Leuer never started, but played in 32 games during the 2007–2008 season for the Wisconsin Badgers. The most points he scored during the non-conference season was 12, but he exploded for 25 (on 8 of 9 shooting) against the Michigan Wolverines in the Big Ten opener. However, after scoring 7 in the follow-up game, Leuer would only score 9 points for the remainder of the season. Much of this spoke to Wisconsin's great depth, as the Badgers would go on to win both the Big Ten regular season, with a 16–2 record, and Big Ten Conference tournament. They would later advance to the Sweet Sixteen in the NCAA tournament and finished with a 31–5 record. Leuer finished the season averaging 2.9 points per game and 1.3 rebounds in 8.6 minutes.

=== Sophomore season (2008–2009) ===
Leuer played in all 33 games and started the final 12 games of the year during the 2008–2009 season. He had 13 double digit scoring games including 17 in a victory at Virginia Tech in the ACC-Big Ten Challenge. He had a season high of 19 points against SIU-Edwardsville. He averaged 8.8 points per game and 3.8 rebounds in 21.3 minutes. The Badgers finished tied for fourth in the Big Ten with a 10–8 record, and a 20–13 record overall. They would upset the #5 seeded Florida State Seminoles in the first round of the NCAA tournament before succumbing to the Xavier Musketeers in the second round. Leuer was named to the Academic All-Big Ten Team.

=== Junior season (2009–2010) ===
The Badgers went into the 2009–2010 season picked 9th in the Big Ten. However, they upset the Arizona Wildcats and Maryland Terrapins in the Maui Invitational. On December 2, 2009, in a game on ESPN, Wisconsin shocked the #5 Duke Blue Devils (who would be the eventual National Champions). Leuer poured in 17 points on his way to scoring double digits in 13 of the first 15 games of the year. He followed up the effort against Duke with back-to-back double doubles at UW-Green Bay (a career high 26 points and 10 rebounds) and against Marquette University (24 points, 12 rebounds). He would also score 25 against UW-Milwaukee and 21 at Michigan State. Wisconsin was off to a surprising 13–3 start (3–1 in the Big Ten) after a 73–66 upset against #4 Purdue. However, Leuer had an off night against Purdue and only scored 4 points on 2–15 shooting. It was revealed after the game that Leuer had broken his wrist in the first half, yet still played 38 of the 40 minutes in the game. Leuer was ruled out indefinitely and he ended up missing the next 9 games.

When Leuer returned, he was eased back into the lineup, scoring 4 points in his first game back, a loss against the Minnesota Golden Gophers. However, Leuer would score double digits in each of the final five games of the year, including 20 against the University of Illinois, as the Badgers went 4–1 down the stretch and finished 13–5 in the Big Ten, good enough for fourth place and a #13 national ranking. Leuer won Big Ten Player of the week for the final week of the regular season. Yet, the Badgers would lose to the Illinois Fighting Illini in the first round of the Big Ten tournament and were upset by Cornell in the second round of the NCAA tournament, despite 14 and 23 points from Leuer respectively.

Leuer ended up leading the Badgers in points per game (15.4), rebounds per game (5.8), and blocks per game (1.33). Due to the wrist injury, he only played in 24 games, starting 22 of them. His .522 field-goal percentage was the highest by a Wisconsin player since Alando Tucker's .533 mark in 2003. He earned honorable mention All-Big Ten, despite missing half of the conference games. He also made the Academic All-Big Ten team for the second straight year.

During the summer, Leuer was selected to be on the United States men's select team, a team of college players hand-picked to help the United States men's national basketball team prepare for the FIBA World Championships. Leuer went with the team to New York City to compete against the likes of Kobe Bryant, LeBron James, and Dwyane Wade. Leuer had been named to the team after impressing Team USA, and Villanova, coach, Jay Wright. When Gary Parrish of CBSSports.com asked Wright to name the best college player with the USA Basketball select team, Wright picked Leuer over Kyle Singler, Nolan Smith, Marcus Morris and others.

"He's really good," Wright told Parrish. "Maybe I haven't followed him as well because he's from the Midwest, and maybe he wouldn't surprise anybody else. But he's got great size, he puts it on the floor, he passes it, he can shoot it. He's just a ballplayer." When asked if he would be an NBA player, Wright answered "yes."

=== Senior season (2010–2011) ===
SI.com named Leuer their Big Ten preseason player of the year. About Leuer, Luke Winn wrote, "Watch out for Leuer, an ultra-efficient, 6-foot-10 forward who'll be the Badgers' clear No. 1 offensive option for the first time in his career."

On December 28, 2010, the Badgers upset then #13 ranked Minnesota Golden Gophers, 68–60. During the first half of the game, Leuer became the 36th player in Wisconsin Badgers history to score 1,000 points in a career.

On March 1, 2011, Leuer was named to the Yahoo Sports All-Big Ten 1st team.

He was picked to the Third Team All-America by Fox Sports. Leuer was named to the Yahoo Sports All-American Team Honorable Mention.

== Professional career ==
=== Skyliners Frankfurt (2011) ===
On June 23, 2011, Leuer was selected by the Milwaukee Bucks with the 40th overall pick in the 2011 NBA draft. He had a stint in Germany with Skyliners Frankfurt during the NBA lockout.

=== Milwaukee Bucks (2011–2012) ===
Leuer joined the Milwaukee Bucks for the 2011–12 season in December 2011.

=== Cleveland Cavaliers (2012–2013) ===
On June 27, 2012, Leuer was traded to the Houston Rockets along with Jon Brockman, Shaun Livingston, and the 12th pick in the 2012 NBA draft in exchange for Samuel Dalembert and the 14th pick in the 2012 NBA draft. He was waived by the Rockets on July 18.

On July 20, 2012, Leuer was claimed off waivers by the Cleveland Cavaliers. On December 7, he was sent down to the Cavaliers' D-League affiliate, the Canton Charge. Leuer was recalled on December 20, reassigned on January 3, 2013, and recalled again on January 7.

=== Memphis Grizzlies (2013–2015) ===
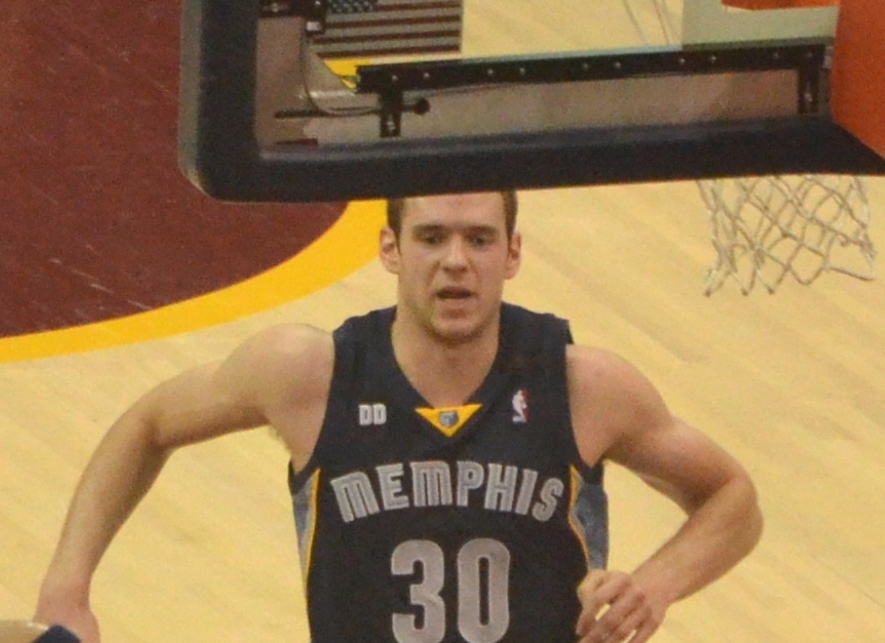
Leuer in March 2013

On January 22, 2013, Leuer was traded to the Memphis Grizzlies in exchange for Marreese Speights, Wayne Ellington, Josh Selby, and a future first-round draft pick.

On July 15, 2013, Leuer was re-signed by the Grizzlies to a three-year, $3 million contract. On December 3, Leuer recorded a career-high 23 points, along with nine rebounds and three blocks, in a 110–91 win over the Phoenix Suns. Six days later, he recorded his first career double-double with 16 points and a career-high 12 rebounds in a 94–85 win over the Orlando Magic. Leuer tied his career–high of 23 points on January 5, 2014, in a 112–84 win over the Detroit Pistons.

On December 7, 2014, Leuer had a season-best game with 20 points and career-high tying 12 rebounds in a 103–87 win over the Miami Heat.

=== Phoenix Suns (2015–2016) ===
On June 25, 2015, Leuer was traded to the Phoenix Suns in exchange for the draft rights to Andrew Harrison. He made his debut for the Suns in the team's season opener against the Dallas Mavericks on October 28, recording 14 points and seven rebounds off the bench in a 111–95 loss. On November 12, he recorded his first double-double as a Sun, recording 10 points and 11 rebounds in a 118–104 win over the Los Angeles Clippers. Two days later, he received his first starting assignment for the Suns, recording seven points and five rebounds in just under 19 minutes of action, helping the Suns defeat the Denver Nuggets 105–81. On November 25, Leuer had a then season-best game with 20 points and 12 rebounds in a loss to the New Orleans Pelicans.

On March 21, 2016, Leuer recorded his seventh double-double of the season (ninth of his career) with 13 points and 13 rebounds in a loss to his former team, the Memphis Grizzlies. Two days later, he had 22 points and a career-high 14 rebounds in a 119–107 win over the Los Angeles Lakers, recording back-to-back double-doubles for the first time in his career. In the Suns' season finale on April 13, Leuer recorded 16 points and matched his career best with 14 rebounds in a 114–105 win over the Clippers.

=== Detroit Pistons (2016–2019) ===
On July 8, 2016, Leuer signed with the Detroit Pistons. On December 30, he scored a then season-high 22 points in a 105–98 loss to the Atlanta Hawks. On February 3, 2017, Leuer scored a career-high 24 points in a 116–108 win over the Minnesota Timberwolves.

Leuer played in only eight games during the 2017–18 season due to an ankle injury, and he decided to have season-ending surgery on it in January. In August 2018, he was reported to have taken surgery on his right knee to repair his medial meniscus. On October 27, 2018, in a 109–89 loss to the Boston Celtics, Leuer made his 2018–19 season debut, his first appearance since October 31, 2017.

On June 20, 2019, Leuer was traded back to the Milwaukee Bucks in exchange for Tony Snell and the draft rights to Kevin Porter Jr. On July 9, Leuer was waived by the Bucks.

Leuer announced his retirement over Instagram on May 24, 2020, at the age of 31.

== Career statistics ==
Legend
GP	Games played	GS	Games started	MPG	Minutes per game
FG%	Field goal percentage	3P%	3-point field goal percentage	FT%	Free throw percentage
RPG	Rebounds per game	APG	Assists per game	SPG	Steals per game
BPG	Blocks per game	PPG	Points per game	**Bold**	Career high

=== NBA ===
==== Regular season ====
Year	Team	GP	GS	MPG	FG%	3P%	FT%	RPG	APG	SPG	BPG	PPG
2011–12	Milwaukee	46	12	12.1	.508	.333	.750	2.6	.5	.3	**.4**	4.7
2012–13	Cleveland	9	0	10.1	.357	.000	.333	1.4	.6	.2	.0	2.4
2012–13	Memphis	19	0	5.1	**.625**	.000	.571	1.3	.2	.2	.0	1.8
2013–14	Memphis	49	0	13.1	.492	**.469**	.787	3.2	.4	.4	.3	6.2
2014–15	Memphis	63	6	13.1	.443	.241	.627	3.3	.7	.3	.1	4.5
2015–16	Phoenix	67	27	18.7	.481	.382	.762	**5.6**	1.1	**.6**	**.4**	8.5
2016–17	Detroit	**75**	**34**	**25.9**	.480	.293	**.867**	5.4	**1.5**	.4	.3	**10.2**
2017–18	Detroit	8	0	17.0	.417	.000	**.867**	4.0	.6	.1	**.4**	5.4
2018–19	Detroit	41	1	9.8	.584	.091	.742	2.4	.3	.3	.1	3.8
Career		377	80	15.8	.484	.328	.767	3.8	.8	.4	.3	6.4

==== Playoffs ====
Year	Team	GP	GS	MPG	FG%	3P%	FT%	RPG	APG	SPG	BPG	PPG
2013	Memphis	**5**	0	2.2	**.500**	–	–	.6	.0	.2	**.2**	.4
2014	Memphis	3	0	**7.7**	.429	**.500**	**1.000**	**2.7**	**.7**	**.3**	.0	**3.0**
2015	Memphis	4	0	2.3	**.500**	–	–	1.3	.0	.0	.0	1.0
2019	Detroit	1	0	5.0	**.500**	–	.000	.0	.0	.0	.0	2.0
Career		13	0	3.7	.467	.500	.667	1.2	.2	.2	.1	1.3

=== College ===
Year	Team	GP	GS	MPG	FG%	3P%	FT%	RPG	APG	SPG	BPG	PPG
2007–08	Wisconsin	32	0	8.6	.472	**.462**	.483	1.3	.4	.1	.1	2.9
2008–09	Wisconsin	33	12	21.3	.466	.296	.605	3.8	.8	**.5**	.6	8.8
2009–10	Wisconsin	24	22	28.8	**.522**	.391	.720	5.8	**1.6**	**.5**	**1.3**	15.4
2010–11	Wisconsin	**34**	**34**	**33.5**	.470	.370	**.843**	**7.2**	**1.6**	**.5**	.9	**18.3**
Career		123	68	22.8	.482	.368	.723	4.5	1.1	.4	.7	11.2

== Personal life ==
Leuer is the son of Mike and Holly Leuer, has two older sisters, Maren and Katie, and is married to Keegan Billick, the daughter of longtime Baltimore Ravens head coach Brian Billick. He was majoring in history while at the University of Wisconsin.
