= List of NBA franchise career scoring leaders =

The National Basketball Association (NBA) is a professional men's basketball league, consisting of 30 teams in North America (29 in the United States and 1 in Canada). The NBA was founded in New York City on June 6, 1946, as the Basketball Association of America (BAA). It adopted the name National Basketball Association at the start of the 1949–50 NBA season when it merged with the National Basketball League (NBL). The NBA is an active member of USA Basketball, which is recognized by FIBA (a French acronym for "International Basketball Federation") as the National Governing Body (NGB) for basketball in the country. The league is considered to be one of the four major professional sports leagues of North America. There have been 15 defunct franchises in NBA history. In basketball, points are the sum of the score accumulated through free throw or field goal. The NBA introduced three-point field goals in the 1979–80 NBA season as a bonus for field goals made from a longer distance. Karl Malone scored 36,374 points with the Utah Jazz, the most points by a player for a single franchise. Kobe Bryant leads the Los Angeles Lakers, scoring the most points in the NBA while playing for only one team in an entire career. Dirk Nowitzki of the Dallas Mavericks is second behind Kobe Bryant in scoring while playing for only one team. Oscar Robertson is the leading scorer for the Sacramento Kings franchise, playing all of his games when they were known as the Cincinnati Royals.

== Regular season scoring leaders ==
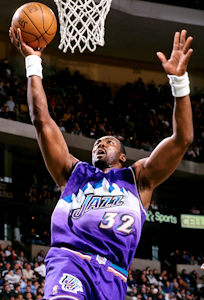
Karl Malone has scored the most points for a single team, having scored 36,374 points for the Utah Jazz.

^	Active NBA player
*	Inducted into the Naismith Memorial Basketball Hall of Fame
†	Not yet eligible for Hall of Fame consideration (Note: A player is not eligible for induction into the Naismith Memorial Basketball Hall of Fame until he has been fully retired for two calendar years.)
‡	Franchise with scoring leader on its current roster

Statistics accurate as of November 12, 2026.

Franchise (Note: This list only includes active NBA franchises.)	Player	Points	Ref
Atlanta Hawks (Note: Formerly Buffalo Bisons (1946), Tri-Cities Blackhawks (1946–1951), Milwaukee Hawks (1951–1955), St. Louis Hawks (1955–1968))	Dominique Wilkins*	23,292	
Boston Celtics	John Havlicek*	26,395	
Brooklyn Nets (Note: Formerly New Jersey Americans (1967–1968), New York Nets (1968–1977), New Jersey Nets (1977–2012))	Brook Lopez^	10,444	
Charlotte Hornets (Note: Formerly Charlotte Bobcats (2004–2014))	Kemba Walker	12,009	
Chicago Bulls	Michael Jordan*	29,277	
Cleveland Cavaliers	LeBron James^	23,119	
Dallas Mavericks	Dirk Nowitzki*	31,560	
Denver Nuggets	Alex English*	21,645	
Detroit Pistons (Note: Formerly Fort Wayne Zollner Pistons (1937–1948), Fort Wayne Pistons (1948–1957))	Isiah Thomas*	18,822	
Golden State Warriors‡ (Note: Formerly Philadelphia Warriors (1946–1962), San Francisco Warriors (1962–1971))	Stephen Curry^	26,806	
Houston Rockets (Note: Formerly San Diego Rockets (1967–1971))	Hakeem Olajuwon*	26,511	
Indiana Pacers	Reggie Miller*	25,279	
Los Angeles Clippers (Note: Formerly Buffalo Braves (1970–1978), San Diego Clippers (1978–1984))	Randy Smith	12,735	
Los Angeles Lakers (Note: Formerly Detroit Gems (1946–1947), Minneapolis Lakers (1947–1960))	Kobe Bryant*	33,643	
Memphis Grizzlies (Note: Formerly Vancouver Grizzlies (1995–2001))	Mike Conley^	11,733	
Miami Heat	Dwyane Wade*	21,556	
Milwaukee Bucks	Giannis Antetokounmpo^	21,531	
Minnesota Timberwolves	Kevin Garnett*	19,201	
New Orleans Pelicans (Note: Formerly New Orleans Hornets (2002–2005, 2007–2013), New Orleans/Oklahoma City Hornets (2005–2007))	Anthony Davis^	11,059	
New York Knicks	Patrick Ewing*	23,665	
Oklahoma City Thunder (Note: Formerly Seattle SuperSonics (1967–2008))	Russell Westbrook^{†}	18,859	
Orlando Magic	Dwight Howard*	11,435	
Philadelphia 76ers (Note: Formerly Syracuse Nationals (1946–1963))	Hal Greer*	21,586	
Phoenix Suns‡	Devin Booker^	18,401	
Portland Trail Blazers‡	Damian Lillard^	19,594	
Sacramento Kings (Note: Formerly Rochester Seagrams (1923–1942), Rochester Eber Seagrams (1942–1943), Rochester Pros (1943–1945), Rochester Royals (1945–1957), Cincinnati Royals (1957–1972), Kansas City-Omaha Kings (1972–1975), Kansas City Kings (1975–1985))	Oscar Robertson*	22,009	
San Antonio Spurs (Note: Formerly Dallas Chaparrals (1967–1970, 1971–1973), Texas Chaparrals (1970–1971))	Tim Duncan*	26,496	
Toronto Raptors	DeMar DeRozan^	13,296	
Utah Jazz (Note: Formerly New Orleans Jazz (1974–1979))	Karl Malone*	36,374	
Washington Wizards (Note: Formerly Chicago Packers (1961–1962), Chicago Zephyrs (1962–1963), Baltimore Bullets (1963–1973), Capital Bullets (1973–1974), Washington Bullets (1974–1997))	Elvin Hayes*	15,551	
