= Baylis (surname) =

Baylis is a surname. Notable people with the surname include:

- Abraham B. Baylis (1811–1882), American businessman
- Anna Baylis (born 1976), Australian mountain biker
- Charles A. Baylis (1902–1975), American philosopher
- Edward Baylis (1791–1861), British mathematician and businessman
- Evan Baylis (born 1993), American football player
- Francoise Baylis (born 1961), Canadian bioethicist
- Frank Baylis (born 1962), Canadian politician
- Geoff Baylis (1913–2003), New Zealand botanist
- Gloria Baylis (1929–2017), Barbadian-Canadian civil rights activist
- Hank Baylis (1923–1980), American baseball player
- Henry Baylis (1826–1905), Australian police magistrate
- James Baylis (died 1870), Irish theatre director
- Jearld Baylis (1962–2024), Canadian football player
- John R. Baylis (1885–1963), American chemist and engineer
- Keith Baylis (born 1947), English cricketer
- Lilian Baylis (1874–1937), British theatrical producer and manager
- Liz Baylis (born 1963), American sailor
- Maggie Baylis (1912–1997), American graphic designer
- Marc Baylis (born 1977), British actor
- Matthew Baylis (born 1971), British novelist and screenwriter
- Myrtle Baylis (1920–2014), Australian cricket and netball international
- Nadine Baylis (1940–2017), British stage and costume designer
- Thomas Baylis (disambiguation), several people
- Trevor Baylis (1937–2018), English inventor
- William Baylis (born 1962), American sailor
