= Bayless =

Bayless is a surname. Notable people with the surname include:

- Becky Bayless (born 1982), American professional wrestler
- Betsey Bayless, American politician who was the Secretary of State of Arizona from 1997 to 2003
- Charles E. Bayless (born 1942), American university president
- Howard Bayless, American healthcare professional and politician
- Kenny Bayless, professional boxing referee
- Rick Bayless (born 1953), American chef, owner of Frontera Grill in Chicago and star of Mexico: One Plate at a Time
- Rick Bayless (American football) (born 1964), American football player
- Jerryd Bayless (born 1988), American basketball player
- Skip Bayless (born 1951), American television sports commentator for ESPN networks
- William F. Bayless (died 1873), American politician

Other uses

- Bayless Markets, a supermarket chain
- Bayless School District, a small public school district in urban St. Louis, Missouri, includes Bayless Senior High School
- US v. Bayless, 921 F. Supp. 211 (S.D.N.Y. 1996), controversial evidentiary ruling by Judge Harold Baer Jr.

== See also ==
- Baylis, a surname
- Bayliss, a surname
