= Baylis =

Baylis may refer to:

== Places ==
- Baylis, Illinois, a village in Pike County, Illinois, United States
- Baylis House, a manor house in Slough, England
- Baylis Road, a road in Lambeth, London, England
- Baylis & Harding, the handwash company based in Redditch, England
- Baylis Street, one of the main shopping streets in Wagga Wagga, New South Wales, Australia
- Baylis Court School, a girls' school in Slough, Berkshire, England

== Other uses ==
- Baylis (surname)
- Baylis–Hillman reaction, a reaction of an aldehyde and an α,β-unsaturated electron-withdrawing group catalyzed by DABCO (1,4-diazabicyclo[2.2.2]octane) to give an allylic alcohol
- Aza-Baylis–Hillman reaction, the reaction of an α,β-unsaturated carbonyl compound with an imine in the presence of a nucleophile

== See also ==
- Bayless, a surname
- Bayliss, a surname
