= Taylor Griffin =

American basketball player

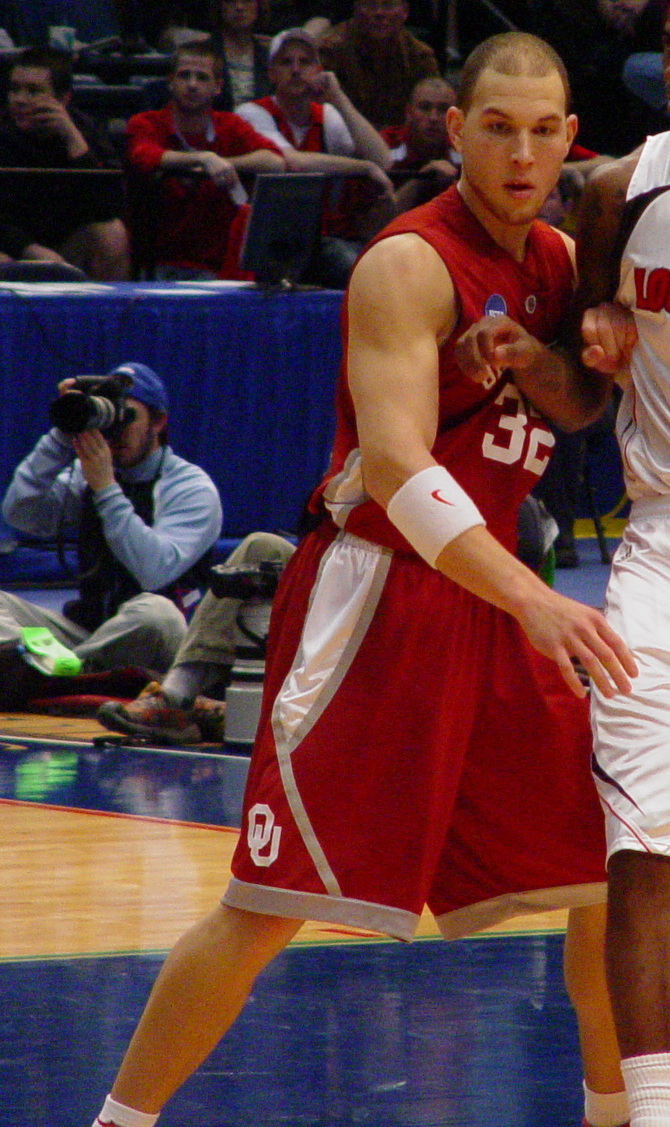

Personal information
- Born: April 18, 1986 (age 40) Oklahoma City, Oklahoma, U.S.
- Listed height: 6 ft 8 in (2.03 m)
- Listed weight: 231 lb (105 kg)

Career information
- High school: Oklahoma Christian School (Edmond, Oklahoma)
- College: Oklahoma (2005–2009)
- NBA draft: 2009: 2nd round, 48th overall pick
- Drafted by: Phoenix Suns
- Playing career: 2009–2016
- Position: Small forward / power forward

Career history
- 2009–2010: Phoenix Suns
- 2009–2010: →Iowa Energy
- 2010–2011: Liège Basket
- 2012: Dakota Wizards
- 2012–2015: Santa Cruz Warriors
- 2015–2016: Pallacanestro Trapani

Career highlights
- NBA D-League champion (2015)
- Stats at NBA.com
- Stats at Basketball Reference

Taylor Drew Griffin (born April 18, 1986) is an American former professional basketball player. He played college basketball for the Oklahoma Sooners and is the older brother of Blake Griffin.

== Early years ==
Taylor Griffin was born on April 18, 1986, in Oklahoma City, Oklahoma, to Tommy Griffin, who is of Haitian descent, and to Gail Griffin, who is white. His father was a basketball center and track standout at NAIA Northwestern Oklahoma State University. Griffin and his younger brother, Blake Griffin, were home-schooled by their mother from first grade until Taylor was in the tenth grade and Blake was in eighth.

Blake and Taylor Griffin played at Oklahoma Christian School under their father, who was the head coach. The brothers played together during the 2003–04 and 2004–05 high school seasons, winning two Oklahoma 2A state high school basketball championships.

Considered a three-star recruit by Rivals.com, Griffin was listed as the No. 34 power forward and the No. 141 player in the nation in 2005.

== College career ==
With his brother Blake, Taylor Griffin helped lead Oklahoma to the Elite Eight of the 2009 NCAA men's basketball tournament. As a senior, he averaged 9.6 points, 5.8 rebounds, and 1.3 steals a game with 53.6% field goal shooting, and 35.7% three-point field goal shooting.

== Professional career ==
=== Phoenix Suns (2009–2010) ===
Griffin was selected by the Phoenix Suns with the 48th overall pick of the 2009 NBA draft. His younger brother Blake was taken as the 1st pick by the Los Angeles Clippers. He joined the Suns for the 2009 NBA Summer League. On August 17, 2009, he signed his first professional contract with the Suns. Griffin was assigned multiple times to the Iowa Energy during his rookie season.

Griffin re-joined the Suns for the 2010 NBA Summer League. On July 26, 2010, he was waived by the Suns.

=== Belgacom Liège Basket (2010–2011) ===
In August 2010, Griffin signed with Belgacom Liège Basket of Belgium.

=== Dakota Wizards (2012) ===
On December 10, 2011, Griffin signed with the Charlotte Bobcats. However, he was waived by the Bobcats on December 23. On January 9, 2012, he was acquired by the Dakota Wizards.

=== Santa Cruz Warriors (2012–2015) ===
In November 2012, Griffin was acquired by the Santa Cruz Warriors. In November 2013, he was reacquired by the Warriors. On January 3, 2014, he was waived by the Warriors due to a season-ending injury. On November 3, 2014, he was again reacquired by the Warriors. On April 26, 2015, he won the D-League championship with the Warriors. He was selected to play on the NBA D-League Select team during the 2015 NBA Summer League in Las Vegas, NV.

=== Pallacanestro Trapani (2015–2016) ===
On August 13, 2015, Griffin signed with Pallacanestro Trapani of the Italian Serie A2.

== Career statistics ==
Legend
| GP | Games played | GS | Games started | MPG | Minutes per game |
| FG% | Field goal percentage | 3P% | 3-point field goal percentage | FT% | Free throw percentage |
| RPG | Rebounds per game | APG | Assists per game | SPG | Steals per game |
| BPG | Blocks per game | PPG | Points per game | **Bold** | Career high |

=== NBA ===
==== Regular season ====
| Year | Team | GP | GS | MPG | FG% | 3P% | FT% | RPG | APG | SPG | BPG | PPG |
|---|---|---|---|---|---|---|---|---|---|---|---|---|
| 2009–10 | Phoenix | 8 | 0 | 4.0 | .400 | .000 | .500 | .3 | .1 | .0 | .3 | 1.3 |

=== NBA D-League ===
==== Regular season ====
| Year | Team | GP | GS | MPG | FG% | 3P% | FT% | RPG | APG | SPG | BPG | PPG |
|---|---|---|---|---|---|---|---|---|---|---|---|---|
| 2009–10 | Iowa | 12 | 11 | **28.9** | .435 | .235 | .705 | 6.2 | **2.2** | **1.3** | .4 | 9.6 |
| 2011–12 | Dakota | 30 | 5 | 18.3 | .382 | .327 | .623 | 4.5 | .8 | .8 | .3 | 6.2 |
| 2012–13 | Santa Cruz | **48** | **44** | 25.6 | .426 | .347 | .669 | **6.5** | 1.9 | 1.2 | **.5** | **10.7** |
| 2014–15 | Santa Cruz | 46 | 21 | 23.7 | **.444** | **.370** | **.819** | 5.7 | 1.6 | .7 | **.5** | 9.7 |
| Career | | 136 | 81 | 23.6 | .426 | .346 | .701 | 5.7 | 1.6 | 1.0 | .5 | 9.3 |

==== Playoffs ====
| Year | Team | GP | GS | MPG | FG% | 3P% | FT% | RPG | APG | SPG | BPG | PPG |
|---|---|---|---|---|---|---|---|---|---|---|---|---|
| 2010 | Iowa | 3 | 2 | 29.0 | .318 | .000 | .357 | **9.3** | 1.0 | 1.0 | .3 | 6.3 |
| 2012 | Dakota | 2 | 0 | 11.5 | .333 | .000 | .750 | 2.5 | 1.0 | .0 | .0 | 2.5 |
| 2013 | Santa Cruz | 6 | **6** | 21.0 | .414 | .400 | **.833** | 5.3 | 1.2 | 1.2 | .2 | 6.0 |
| 2015 | Santa Cruz | **7** | **6** | **30.6** | **.480** | **.462** | .808 | 5.0 | **2.6** | **1.6** | **.6** | **14.1** |
| Career | | 18 | 14 | 25.0 | .434 | .400 | .696 | 5.6 | 1.7 | 1.2 | .3 | 8.8 |
