= 2007 McDonald's All-American Boys Game =

American high school basketball game

West	East
114	112
	1st half	2nd half	Total
West	68	46	114
East	57	55	112
- Date: March 28, 2007
- Venue: Freedom Hall, Louisville, Kentucky
- MVP: Michael Beasley
- Referees: Eric Ballenger; Scott Johnson; Alfred Smith
- Attendance: 11,632
- National anthem: Patrick Henry Hughes
- Halftime show: Timbaland
- Network: ESPN

McDonald's All-American

The 2007 McDonald's All-American Boys Game was an All-star basketball game played on Wednesday, March 28, 2007, at Freedom Hall in Louisville, Kentucky, home of the University of Louisville Cardinals. The game's rosters featured the best and most highly recruited high school boys graduating in 2007. The game was the 30th annual version of the McDonald's All-American Game first played in 1978.

The 48 players were selected from 2,500 nominees by a committee of basketball experts. They were chosen not only for their on-court skills, but for their performances off the court as well. Coach Morgan Wootten, who had more than 1,200 wins as head basketball coach at DeMatha High School, was chairman of the selection committee. Legendary UCLA coach John Wooden, who has been involved in the McDonald's All American Games since its inception, served as chairman of the Games and as an advisor to the selection committee.

Proceeds from the 2007 McDonald's All American High School Basketball Games went to Ronald McDonald House Charities (RMHC) of Kentuckiana and its Ronald McDonald House program.

== 2007 game ==
The game was telecast live by ESPN. Record-producer Timbaland performed a halftime performance with the All American girls.

JJ Hickson scored a team-high 14 points, while shooting 78% from the field, for the East squad. Naismith Sportsmanship Award winner Gani Lawal recorded a double-double with 12 points and 12 rebounds. Nick Calathes contributed with a solid performance, as he scored 13 points (3-3 from beyond the arc), grabbed 5 rebounds and dished out 6 assists.

The West Team was led by Michael Beasley, as he tallied 23 points and 12 rebounds. Both of those totals place Beasley in the record books and for that he was crowned the John R. Wooden MVP of the game. Wootten Award winner Kevin Love proved he was deserving of the honor, as he added 13 points and 6 rebounds. Long-range specialist Jerryd Bayless added 11 points and was a perfect 2–2 from three-point range.

Shooting 54% from the field and 42% from three-point land, the West team took an 11-point lead into the locker room. A strong defensive effort by the East team in the second half helped keep the game close. The West squad was limited to just one three-point basket and three free throws in the second half. Held scoreless from the 2:31 mark on, the West relied on solid defense and an errant shot by O. J. Mayo at the buzzer to escape with the 114–112 victory.

=== 2007 West roster ===
ESPN 100 Rank	Name	Height (ft–in)	Weight (lb)	Position	Hometown	High school	College choice
13	Cole Aldrich	6–10	245	C	Bloomington, MN	Bloomington Jefferson High School	Kansas
24	James Anderson	6–5	190	SF	Junction City, AR	Junction City High School	Oklahoma State
39	Jerryd Bayless	6–3	190	SG	Phoenix, AZ	St. Mary's High School	Arizona
8	Michael Beasley	6–9	235	PF	Upper Marlboro, MD	Notre Dame Preparatory School	Kansas State
2	Eric Gordon	6–5	205	SG	Indianapolis, IN	North Central High School	Indiana
18	Blake Griffin	6–9	230	PF	Edmond, OK	Oklahoma Christian School	Oklahoma
21	James Harden	6–5	190	SG	Lakewood, CA	Artesia High School	Arizona State
16	Taylor King	6–7	225	SF	Santa Ana, CA	Mater Dei High School	Duke
1	Kevin Love	6–9	255	C	Lake Oswego, OR	Lake Oswego High School	UCLA
19	Jai Lucas	5–10	165	PG	Bellaire, TX	Bellaire High School	Florida
5	Derrick Rose	6–4	195	PG	Chicago, IL	Simeon Career Academy	Memphis
4	Kyle Singler	6–8	215	SF	Medford, OR	South Medford High School	Duke

=== 2007 East Roster ===
ESPN 100 Rank	Name	Height (ft–in)	Weight (lb)	Position	Hometown	High school	College choice
10	Nick Calathes	6–5	185	SG	Winter Park, FL	Lake Howell High School	Florida
23	Jonny Flynn	6–0	170	PG	Niagara Falls, NY	Niagara Falls High School	Syracuse
7	Austin Freeman	6–3	185	SG	Hyattsville, MD	DeMatha Catholic High School	Georgetown
17	Donté Greene	6–8	215	PF	Baltimore, MD	Towson Catholic High School	Syracuse
14	JJ Hickson	6–8	235	PF	Marietta, GA	Wheeler High School	N.C. State
12	Kosta Koufos	7–1	250	C	Canton, OH	GlenOak High School	Ohio State
22	Gani Lawal	6–8	225	PF	Norcross, GA	Norcross High School	Georgia Tech
3	O. J. Mayo	6–4	195	SG	Huntington, WV	Huntington High School	USC
9	Patrick Patterson	6–8	245	PF	Huntington, WV	Huntington High School	Kentucky
6	Nolan Smith	6–4	185	SG	Upper Marlboro, MD	Oak Hill Academy	Duke
15	Corey Stokes	6–6	215	SG	Bayonne, NJ	Saint Benedict's Preparatory School	Villanova
26	Chris Wright	6–0	190	SG	Washington, D.C.	St. John's College High School	Georgetown
8	Andy Miller	5-11	180	PG	Spartanburg, SC	Spartanburg High School	University of North Carolina

(* = starting line-up)

=== Coaches ===
The West team was coached by:

- Head Coach Derrick Taylor of William Howard Taft High School (Woodland Hills, California)
- Asst Coach Yutaka Shimizu of William Howard Taft High School (Woodland Hills, California)
- Asst Coach Jacob Pollon of William Howard Taft High School (Woodland Hills, California)

The East team was coached by:

- Co-Head Coach Gary Forrest of Oldham County High School (Buckner, Kentucky)
- Co-Head Coach Steve Wright of South Laurel High School (London, Kentucky)
- Asst Coach Mike Listerman of Covington Catholic High School (California, Kentucky)

=== Boxscore ===
==== Visitors: West ====
##	Player	FGM/A	3PM/A	FTM/A	Points	Off Reb	Def Reb	Tot Reb	PF	Ast	TO	BS	ST	Min
22	*Eric Gordon	5/13	1/ 5	2/ 2	13	2	1	3	2	2	2	0	1	22
25	*Derrick Rose	2/ 5	0/ 1	1/ 2	5	2	4	6	1	5	3	0	0	22
30	*Michael Beasley	10/13	2/ 3	1/ 2	23	6	6	12	3	2	5	0	1	20
33	*Kyle Singler	4/ 7	0/ 3	2/ 2	10	2	2	4	0	1	0	0	0	17
42	*Kevin Love	6/10	1/ 2	0/ 0	13	3	3	6	2	3	0	0	1	20
5	Jai Lucas	3/ 8	1/ 2	1/ 2	8	0	0	0	1	3	2	0	1	15
13	James Harden	4/ 7	0/ 2	0/ 0	8	0	1	1	1	1	0	0	1	13
15	Blake Griffin	2/ 3	0/ 0	0/ 0	4	3	2	5	1	1	1	0	0	16
24	James Anderson	1/ 4	0/ 1	3/ 4	5	1	2	3	0	0	0	0	0	11
31	Taylor King	3/ 9	2/ 5	0/ 0	8	1	1	2	0	0	1	0	1	13
32	Jerryd Bayless	3/ 7	2/ 2	3/ 4	11	0	1	1	0	0	2	1	0	16
45	Cole Aldrich	3/ 4	0/ 0	0/ 0	6	3	5	8	3	1	1	4	0	15
	TOTALS	46/90	9/26	13/18	114	25	29	54	14	19	17	5	6	200

==== Home: East ====
##	Player	FGM/A	3PM/A	FTM/A	Points	Off Reb	Def Reb	Tot Reb	PF	Ast	TO	BS	ST	Min
4	*Jonny Flynn	3/ 7	1/ 3	2/ 2	9	2	0	2	0	6	2	0	1	20
20	*Donté Greene	4/ 7	1/ 4	1/ 2	10	1	1	2	1	1	1	0	1	17
31	*Kosta Koufos	3/ 5	1/ 1	2/ 2	9	2	0	2	2	0	0	0	0	11
32	*O. J. Mayo	4/17	1/ 9	3/ 4	12	1	2	3	1	1	3	1	3	23
54	*Patrick Patterson	4/ 5	0/ 0	0/ 0	8	1	4	5	1	2	0	3	2	20
1	Chris Wright	0/ 3	0/ 2	0/ 2	0	0	2	2	0	4	1	0	0	11
2	J.J. Hickson	7/ 9	0/ 1	0/ 2	14	5	1	6	2	0	0	0	0	16
3	Austin Freeman	4/ 7	1/ 3	0/ 0	9	1	3	4	0	2	0	0	1	16
22	Nolan Smith	3/ 8	0/ 0	2/ 2	8	2	0	2	2	1	0	1	1	13
24	Corey Stokes	3/ 3	2/ 2	0/ 0	8	0	1	1	2	2	1	0	1	13
30	Gani Lawal	5/12	0/ 1	2/ 5	12	8	4	12	1	2	1	0	1	18
33	Nick Calathes	5/14	0/ 4	3/ 3	13	4	1	5	0	6	1	1	2	22
08	Andy Miller	5/12	2/ 4	3/ 4	14	4	1	5	0	6	1	1	2	22
Team					0	1	1							
	TOTALS	47/97	8/30	15/24	114	27	20	47	12	27	10	6	13	202

(* = Starting Line-up)

== All-American Week ==
=== Schedule ===
- Tuesday, March 27: Powerade Jamfest
  - Slam Dunk Contest
  - Three-Point Shoot-out
  - Timed Basketball Skills Competition
- Wednesday, March 28: 30th Annual Boys All-American Game

The Powerade JamFest is a skills-competition evening featuring basketball players who demonstrate their skills in three crowd-entertaining ways. The slam dunk contest was first held in 1987, and a 3-point shooting challenge was added in 1989. This year, for the first time, a timed basketball skills competition was added to the schedule of events.

=== Contest winners ===
- The 2007 Powerade Slam Dunk contest was won by Blake Griffin.
- Chris Wright was winner of the 2007 3-point shoot-out.
- The skills competition was won by Nolan Smith.
- These events were held at Knights Hall on the campus of Louisville's Bellarmine University.

== See also ==
2007 McDonald's All-American Girls Game
