= Corey Stokes =

American basketball player (born 1988)

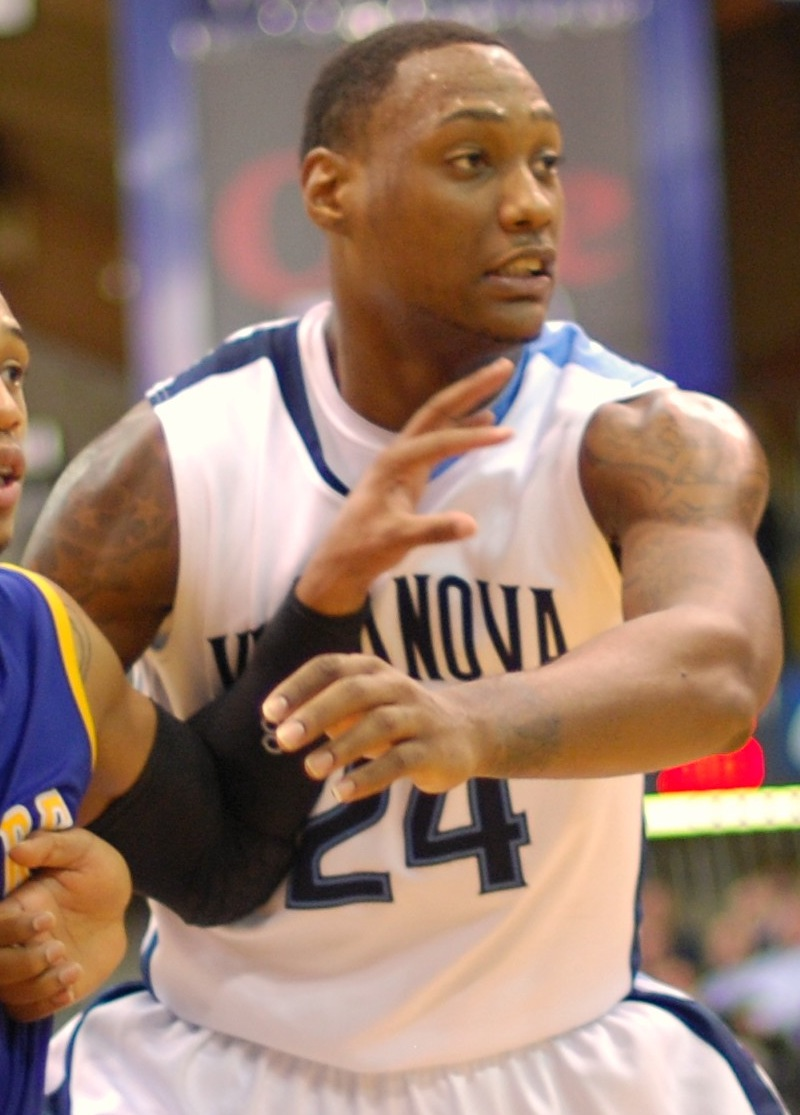

Personal information
- Born: April 24, 1988 (age 38) Jersey City, New Jersey, U.S.
- Listed height: 6 ft 5 in (1.96 m)
- Listed weight: 220 lb (100 kg)

Career information
- High school: Saint Benedict's Prep (Newark, New Jersey)
- College: Villanova (2007–2011)
- NBA draft: 2011: undrafted
- Playing career: 2011–2013
- Position: Shooting guard

Career history
- 2011–2012: BBC Bayreuth
- 2012: Maine Red Claws
- 2013: LF Basket Norrbotten
- 2013: Keravnos B.C.

Career highlights
- Third-team All-Big East (2011); Second-team Parade All-American (2007); McDonald's All-American (2007)

Corey Stokes (born April 24, 1988) is an American former professional basketball player. He played college basketball at Villanova University and was best known for his three-point shooting.

== High school ==
A native of Bayonne, New Jersey, Stokes played high school basketball for head coach Dan Hurley at St. Benedict's Prep School in Newark, New Jersey. During his four seasons with the Gray Bees, he was teammates with NBA Star J. R. Smith of the Cleveland Cavaliers, Lance Thomas of the New York Knicks, and fellow NCAA Division I basketball players, including Eugene Harvey (Seton Hall), David Cubillan (Marquette), and Samardo Samuels (Louisville), and others.

=== Freshman ===
As a freshman in 2003–04, Stokes averaged 8.2 points, 4.3 rebounds, 3.1 assists and two steals per game for a talented Gray Bees squad that finished 29–2 with a runner-up finish in the 2004 Prep A state tournament.

=== Sophomore ===
As a sophomore in 2004–05, Stokes helped lead St. Benedict's to the Prep A state title, averaging 15.2 points per game, 8.2 rebounds, 3.5 assists, and 2.3 steals. He was named the Metro Hoops Sophomore of the Year and a second team All-State pick by NJHoops.com

=== Junior ===
As a junior in 2005–06, Stokes averaged 13 points, 11 rebounds and 5 assists for the 30-2 Gray Bees, who won their second consecutive New Jersey Prep A state championship. He was a first team All-Prep selection by NJHoops.com.

=== Senior ===
As a senior in 2006–07, Stokes averaged 35.0 points, 8.8 rebounds and 4.2 assists in leading the Gray Bees to a 24–1 record. He was named to the prestigious McDonald's and Parade All-American teams, as well as being named an EA Sports All-American and first team All-New Jersey by the Newark Star-Ledger. Stokes also participated in the Roundball Classic and was invited to try out for USA Basketball's 19-and-under team following the season. Scout.com ranked Stokes as the 9th best shooting guard in the high school class of 2007 (37th overall), while Rivals.com ranked him as the 8th best small forward (28th overall).

== College ==
Stokes verbally committed to play for head coach Jay Wright at Villanova University in June 2006, selecting the Wildcats over the University of Connecticut and University of Florida, among others. He cited the desire to play alongside fellow guard Corey Fisher as one of his reasons for selecting Villanova.

=== Freshman ===
Stokes' transition to the college game in 2007–08 started slowly, as he averaged less than four points per game in limited action over the team's first 19 games. Beginning in mid-February, however, he played a major role in Villanova's late-season push to the NCAA Tournament. Stokes scored in double-figures in seven of the team's final 12 games, including a career-high 20 points versus Siena in the second round of the NCAA Tournament. He was named the Big East Conference Rookie of the Week on February 25 after scoring 16 points in a win over West Virginia and scoring 18 points, on 4-of-7 shooting from beyond the 3-point arc, in an upset victory over then No. 13 Connecticut.

Stokes was involved in one of the more controversial calls of the college basketball season when he was whistled for bumping Georgetown's Jonathan Wallace out of bounds with one-tenth of a second remaining in the February 11 match-up. The foul call was made during a tie game, nearly 70 feet away from the basket. Georgetown won the game, 55–53, on Wallace's free throws.

Stokes finished his freshman season averaging 18.3 minutes, 6.4 points, 2.4 rebounds, and 0.5 assists per game. He shot 37% from the field, including 30% from three-point territory, and 88% from the foul line.

=== Sophomore ===
In Stokes's sophomore season he averaged 22.8 minutes, 9.3 points, 3.4 rebounds, 1.0 assists. He hit numerous vital shots to propel his team to the Final Four, where they lost to North Carolina. He shot 41% from the field, 41.8% from 3-point territory, and 85% from the foul line during the season.

=== Junior ===
During Stokes's junior season, he averaged 26 minutes, 9.5 ppg, 4.0 rebounds, and 0.9 assists. He shot 41.6% from the field, 38.3% from the 3-point territory, and 87.3% from the charity stripe.

=== Senior ===
Stokes's senior season was highlighted by ESPN's College Gameday coming to campus for a game against the University of Pittsburgh. Due to turf toe injury that plagued him for most of the second half of the season he was unable to play in the game. For his senior year he averaged 14.9 ppg, 3.3 rebounds, and 1.3 assists. He declared for the 2011 NBA draft, but went undrafted and decided to explore his professional options in France, Spain and Turkey.

== Professional career ==
In September 2011, Stokes signed his first professional contract with BBC Bayreuth of the German Basketball Bundesliga. He later left Bayreuth in January 2012. In March 2012, he was acquired by the Maine Red Claws. The Red Claws waived him a week later due to injury.

In January 2013, he signed with LF Basket Norrbotten of Sweden. Later that month, he was waived due to injury after just 2 games. In February 2013, he signed with Keravnos B.C. of Cyprus.

On October 31, 2013, he was re-acquired by the Maine Red Claws. However, he was later waived on November 17.
