= Thomas Baylis =

Thomas Baylis may refer to:

- Thomas Henry Baylis (1817–1908), English barrister and judge
- Thomas Baylis (businessman) (1823–1876), British businessman
- Tom Baylis (born 1996), English cyclist
