= Gani Lawal =

Nigerian-American basketball player (born 1988)

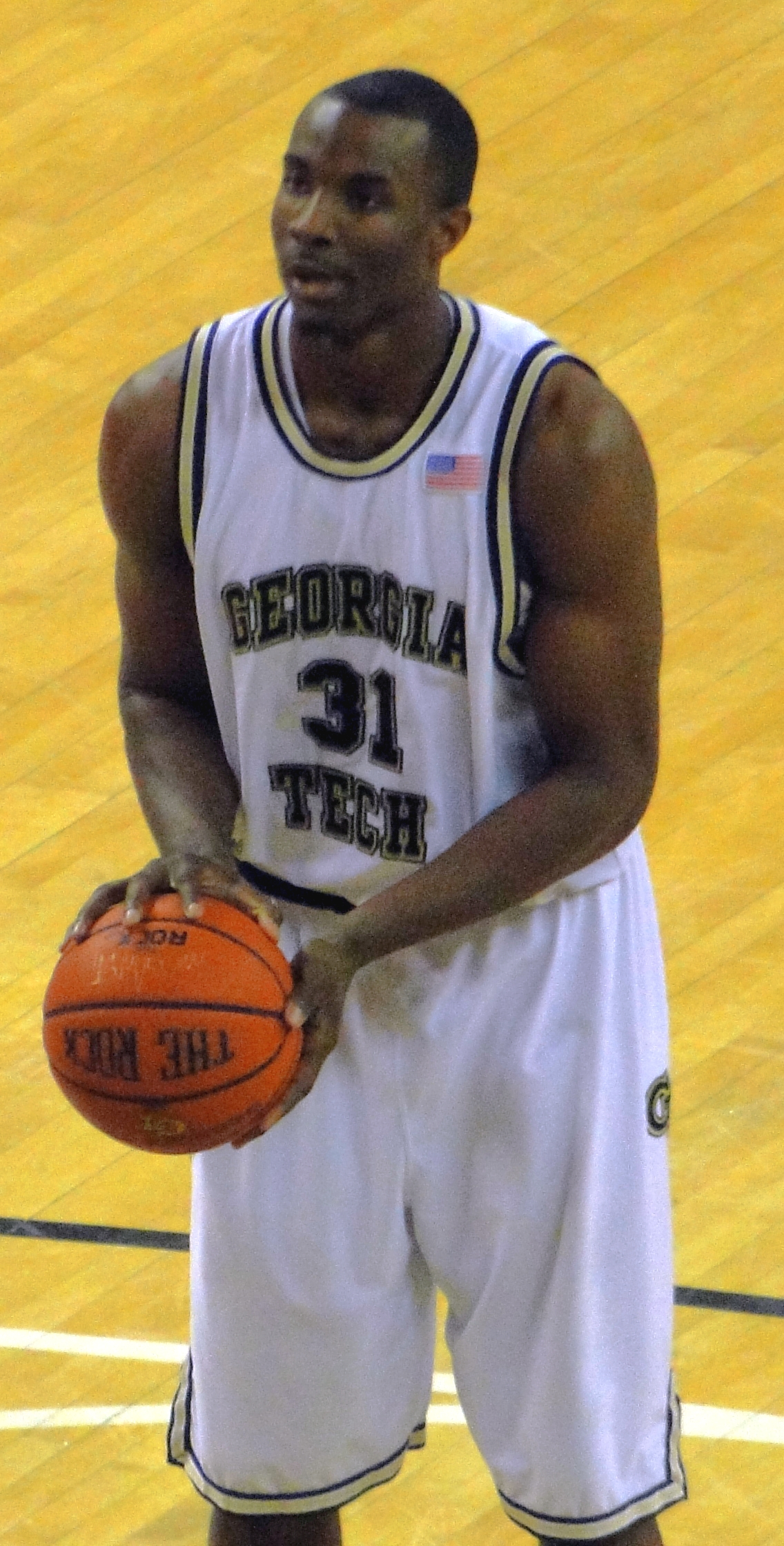
- Lawal playing for Georgia Tech in 2009

Personal information
- Born: November 7, 1988 (age 38) College Park, Georgia, U.S.
- Listed height: 6 ft 9 in (2.06 m)
- Listed weight: 234 lb (106 kg)

Career information
- High school: Norcross (Norcross, Georgia)
- College: Georgia Tech (2007–2010)
- NBA draft: 2010: 2nd round, 46th overall pick
- Drafted by: Phoenix Suns
- Playing career: 2010–2023
- Position: Power forward / center

Career history
- 2010–2011: Phoenix Suns
- 2010: →Iowa Energy
- 2011: Zastal Zielona Góra
- 2011–2012: Xinjiang Flying Tigers
- 2012: Zastal Zielona Góra
- 2012: Chorale Roanne
- 2012–2013: Virtus Roma
- 2013: Guangzhou Liu Sui
- 2013: VEF Rīga
- 2013–2014: Emporio Armani Milano
- 2014–2015: Trabzonspor
- 2015: Panathinaikos
- 2015: Emporio Armani Milano
- 2015: Delaware 87ers
- 2015–2016: Westchester Knicks
- 2016: Reno Bighorns
- 2016: Al-Ahli Dubai
- 2016: Pallacanestro Cantù
- 2016–2017: Dinamo Sassari
- 2017: Karesi Spor
- 2018: Petrochimi Bandar Imam
- 2018: San Lorenzo
- 2018–2019: Shiga Lakestars
- 2019: Meralco Bolts
- 2019: Krka
- 2020: Rizing Zephyr Fukuoka
- 2020: Iwate Big Bulls
- 2020: Ironi Ramat Gan
- 2020–2021: Al Rayyan Doha
- 2021–2022: Champagne Châlons-Reims
- 2022: Trotamundos
- 2022–2023: Runa Basket Moscow
- 2023: Plateros de Fresnillo

Career highlights
- Greek Cup winner (2015); Italian Serie A champion (2014); Italian League Rebounding Leader (2013); Italian Serie A All-Star (2013); 2× Third-team All-ACC (2009, 2010); Second-team Parade All-American (2007); McDonald's All-American (2007); Mr. Georgia Basketball (2007)
- Stats at NBA.com
- Stats at Basketball Reference

Gani Oladimeji Lawal Jr. (born November 7, 1988) is a Nigerian-American former professional basketball player. He played college basketball for Georgia Tech.

== High school career ==
During his time at Norcross High School, Lawal was named to the McDonald's All-American Team, following his senior season, and was Mr. Basketball 2007 in Georgia.

Considered a four-star recruit by Rivals.com, Lawal was listed as the No. 7 power forward and the No. 29 player in the nation in 2007.

== College career ==
As a freshman in 2007–08, Lawal scored 10 points on 5-of-6 shots, with four rebounds at Duke, snapping a streak of six games in single digits. He also had a game-high nine rebounds in a 77–64 win over Presbyterian on January 6, 2008.

As a sophomore in 2008–09, Lawal scored a career-best 34 points in an 85–83 Georgia Tech loss to Penn State, on December 3, 2008. He had a career-high 16 rebounds in a 63–58 win over Tennessee State, on December 30, 2008. He bested that mark by one rebound, when he pulled down 17 in a 70–56 home loss to Duke, on January 14, 2009.

After originally entering the NBA draft following his sophomore year, Lawal pulled out of the draft on June 14, 2009, to return to Georgia Tech for his junior year. As a junior, Lawal led the team in field-goal percentage and blocked shots.

== Professional career ==
Lawal was drafted by the Phoenix Suns with the 46th overall pick in the 2010 NBA draft. On August 1, 2010, he signed a three-year deal with the Suns. On November 16, 2010, he was assigned to the Iowa Energy of the NBA Development League. He was recalled by the Suns on December 19 and made his NBA debut on December 31, recording one foul in two minutes of action against the Detroit Pistons. His season was later ended on January 6 after he suffered a torn ACL.

During the 2011 NBA lockout, Lawal played for Zastal Zielona Góra of the Polish Basketball League. After the lockout ended, he returned to the United States. However, he was waived by the Phoenix on December 9, 2011, and three days later, signed with the San Antonio Spurs. He was waived by the Spurs on December 22 prior to the start of the regular season.

On December 27, 2011, Lawal signed with the Xinjiang Flying Tigers to replace the outgoing Kenyon Martin. He appeared in 17 games for Xinjiang before being released by the club prior to the start of the 2012 CBA Playoffs. He subsequently returned to Zastal, but lasted just three games. In April 2012, he signed with the French League club Chorale Roanne for the rest of the season.

In August 2012, Lawal joined the Italian League team Virtus Roma. In July 2013, he has a short stint with Chinese NBL club Guangzhou Liu Sui.

On August 9, 2013, Lawal signed a one-year deal with the Latvian League team VEF Rīga. However, it was reported that he chose not to travel with the team for a Euroleague qualification match on October 1, 2013. The team's coach also said that he was disappointed with Lawal's attitude. Two days later, he parted ways with VEF Rīga before appearing in a game for them.

On October 5, 2013, Lawal signed with the Philadelphia 76ers. However, he was later waived by the 76ers on October 27 after appearing in six preseason games. On November 5, 2013, he signed with the Italian team Emporio Armani Milano for the rest of the 2013–14 season.

In August 2014, Lawal signed with Trabzonspor of the Turkish Basketball League. On January 31, 2015, he left Trabzonspor and signed with the Greek powerhouse Panathinaikos. On May 11, 2015, he parted ways with Panathinaikos.

On July 14, 2015, Lawal signed a one-year deal with Emporio Armani Milan, returning to the club for a second stint. On November 27, he parted ways with Milano after appearing in three league games and five Euroleague games. On December 1, he was acquired by the Delaware 87ers of the NBA Development League. On December 12, he had a season-best game with 10 points and 10 rebounds in a loss to the Westchester Knicks. On December 30, he was traded to the Westchester Knicks in exchange for a 2016 second-round pick. On January 2, 2016, he made his debut with Westchester in a 106–97 win over Delaware, recording nine points, five rebounds, two steals and one block in 21 minutes. On February 23, he was traded again, this time to the Reno Bighorns along with a 2016 fourth-round pick, in exchange for the returning player rights to Ra'shad James and a 2016 sixth-round pick. Three days later, he made his debut for Reno in a 121–115 loss to the Santa Cruz Warriors, recording 11 points and 12 rebounds in 14 minutes. On April 15, 2016, Lawal signed with UAE basketball club Al-Ahli Dubai.

On July 6, 2016, Lawal signed with Italian club Pallacanestro Cantù for the 2016–17 season. On November 29, 2016, he parted ways with Cantù after appearing in nine games. The next day, he signed with Dinamo Sassari for the rest of the season.

On July 26, 2017, Lawal signed a one-year deal with Karesi Spor of the Turkish Basketball First League. On January 13, 2018, he moved to Petrochimi Bandar Imam of the Iranian Basketball Super League.

In May 2019, Lawal signed with the Meralco Bolts of the Philippine Basketball Association as their import for the 2019 PBA Commissioner's Cup.

On July 8, 2020, he has signed with Ironi Ramat Gan of the Liga Artzit. After playing in one preseason game, Lawal parted ways with the team on September 24.

On December 6, 2020, he has signed with Al Rayyan Sports Club of the Qatari Basketball League.

On February 21, 2021, Lawal signed with Champagne Châlons-Reims in the Pro A.

On June 16, 2022, he has signed with Trotamundos in the Venezuelan SuperLiga.

== National team career ==
Lawal has been a member of the senior men's Nigerian national basketball team, playing for the team at the 2013 FIBA Africa Championship.

== The Basketball Tournament (TBT) ==
In the summer of 2017, Lawal competed in The Basketball Tournament on ESPN for the number one-seeded FCM Untouchables. Competing for the $2 million grand prize, Lawal averaged 6.7 points, 6.7 rebounds and 1.3 steals per game while shooting 62% from the field. The Untouchables advanced to the Super 16 Round where they were defeated 85–71 by Team FOE, a Philadelphia-based team coached by NBA forwards Markieff and Marcus Morris. Lawal finished the game with 7 points and 7 rebounds in 15 minutes.

== Personal life ==
Lawal is the son of American Michelle, and Nigerian Gani Sr. He has two sisters, Khalilah and Chasitie, and one brother, Khalil.

== Career statistics ==
Legend
GP	Games played	GS	Games started	MPG	Minutes per game
FG%	Field goal percentage	3P%	3-point field goal percentage	FT%	Free throw percentage
RPG	Rebounds per game	APG	Assists per game	SPG	Steals per game
BPG	Blocks per game	PPG	Points per game	**Bold**	Career high

=== College ===
Year	Team	GP	GS	MPG	FG%	3P%	FT%	RPG	APG	SPG	BPG	PPG
2007–08	Georgia Tech	32	25	17.3	**.570**	.000	.495	3.5	.3	.4	1.0	7.2
2008–09	Georgia Tech	31	30	**29.6**	.556	.000	.559	**9.5**	**.6**	**1.0**	**1.5**	**15.1**
2009–10	Georgia Tech	**36**	**36**	25.8	.529	.000	**.572**	8.5	.4	.4	1.4	13.1
**Career**		99	91	24.2	.548	.000	.549	7.2	.5	.6	1.3	11.8

=== NBA ===
==== Regular season ====
Year	Team	GP	GS	MPG	FG%	3P%	FT%	RPG	APG	SPG	BPG	PPG
2010–11	Phoenix	1	0	2.0	–	–	–	.0	.0	.0	.0	.0
