= Bayliss =

Bayliss is a surname. Notable people with the surname include:

- Adam Bayliss, film producer
- Alfred Bayliss, American educational administrator
- Brendan Bayliss, musician
- David Bayliss, footballer
- Edward Bayliss, cricketer
- George Bayliss, Australian Rules footballer
- John Bayliss, British poet and editor
- Jonah Bayliss, baseball player
- Jonathan Bayliss, novelist and playwright
- Lisa Bayliss, field hockey player
- Mark Bayliss, Australian Rules footballer
- Mary Bayliss, English magistrate and Lord Lieutenant of the county of Berkshire
- Peter Bayliss, English actor
- Richard Bayliss, English medical doctor and Physician to the Queen
- Simon Bayliss, musician
- Trevor Bayliss, Australian cricketer
- Troy Bayliss, motorcycle racer
- William Bayliss, physiologist
- Wyke Bayliss, painter, author, and poet
- Zoe Burrell Bayliss, American college administrator
- Bayliss Levrett, racing driver

== Fictional characters ==
- Jim/Sue Bayliss, in All My Sons
- Tim Bayliss, a fictional character in TV show Homicide: Life on the Street

== See also ==
- Bayliss, California, unincorporated community in Glenn County
- Bayliss Avenue, football stadium in London
- Bayliss Effect, physiological process discovered by William Bayliss
- Baylis (disambiguation)
- Menahem Mendel Beilis
