= Douglas Baylis =

American landscape architect

Douglas G. Baylis
- Born: January 7, 1915; East Orange, New Jersey, U.S.
- Died: November 28, 1971 (aged 56); San Francisco, California, U.S.
- Occupation: Landscape architect
- Spouse: Maggie Baylis

Douglas Baylis (January 7, 1915 – November 28, 1971) was a landscape architect often credited as a founder of the "California School" of modern landscape architecture alongside contemporaries Thomas Church, Garrett Eckbo, and Robert Royston.

== Early life and education ==
Baylis was born in 1915 in East Orange, New Jersey and moved to California, where he attended high school; he graduated in 1941 from the University of California, Berkeley with a degree in landscape architecture, minoring in art and architecture. His professors at Berkeley included H. Leland Vaughan, John William Gregg, and Harry Shepherd. Baylis was the first to receive the student award from the American Society of Landscape Architects (ASLA).

Baylis met his wife, graphic designer Maggie (née Hilbiber), after she moved to California and advertised for "hands for hire"; the two were married in 1948. Doug and Maggie's strengths complemented each other and they collaborated successfully, primarily on residential gardens, throughout his career.

== Career ==
After graduation, Baylis worked for Thomas Church for approximately four years before leaving to start his own firm, working from his home office on Telegraph Hill. Baylis was retained as the supervising landscape architect for the Berkeley campus from 1956 to 1959. He served on the San Francisco Arts Commission in the late 1950s and was appointed a trustee of the ASLA in 1963.

Notable commissions include:

- Civic Center Plaza, San Francisco
- Washington Square, San Francisco (1956, with Francis J. McCarthy)
- Monterey Road
- Gardens at IBM Headquarters, San Jose (1957, with John Savage Bolles)
- Glen Park and Balboa Park stations for BART (1968–70, with Ernest Born)
- Unit-House, Hayward (in collaboration with architect Gordon Drake)

Baylis was hired and created conceptual designs for the surface level of Portsmouth Square in the late 1950s while plans were being prepared to excavate an underground parking garage, but later disavowed further work on the site.

Douglas and Maggie Baylis worked with the Douglas Fir Plywood Association in the early 1960s to develop the "Play Projects": portable wooden structural units designed for children to stack, climb, and play, including Plyform (later renamed Tri-Tower), Flying Saucer, Tippy-totter, Freeway, Climbing Tower, and Kitty Corner.

== Death and legacy ==
Baylis died in 1971 in San Francisco.

A scholarship is named for Baylis, established in 1998 by the Maggie Baylis Revocable Living Trust, for landscape architecture students studying at Cal Poly San Luis Obispo.
