= Thomas Baylis (businessman) =

British insurance company manager (1823–1876)

Thomas Hutchinson Baylis (1823–1876), was a promoter of insurance offices.

He was the son of Edward Baylis, and began life as a clerk in the Anchor, one of his father's insurance companies. In 1850 he became manager of the Trafalgar Office, also founded by his father. About 1852 he founded the Unity General Life Insurance Office and the Unity Bank. He exhibited a great deal of tact in the establishment of these companies, but he was speedily in disagreement with his colleagues in the management, and in October 1856 retired from the control. He then emigrated to Australia, and endeavoured to organise some insurance companies there, but, achieving no success, he returned to England in 1857, and founded and became managing director of the British, Foreign, and Colonial Insurance Association, which soon was in liquidation, and of the Consols Life Association, which lasted from 1858 to 1862. Into these insurance offices Baylis introduced new features, which ran counter to the ‘Lottery Acts,’ and were declared illegal. His project of ‘Consols Insurance’ engaged much attention, and was adopted in a modified form by the British Imperial Office.

In 1869 Baylis invented the ‘Positive Life Assurance,’ an ingenious form of life policy, which was adopted in 1870 by the ‘Positive Government Security Life Assurance Company, Limited,’ wherein lives exposed to tropical climates were insured at something nearly approaching ordinary rates. Baylis died in 1876, aged 53.
