= Keith Baylis =

English cricketer (born 1947)

Cricket information
- Batting: Right-handed
- Bowling: Leg-break

Career statistics
Competition	First-class
Matches	6
Runs scored	89
Batting average	14.83
100s/50s	0/0
Top score	26
Balls bowled	922
Wickets	14
Bowling average	35.35
5 wickets in innings	0
10 wickets in match	0
Best bowling	4/112
Catches/stumpings	2/–
- Source: Cricinfo, 14 April 2023

Keith Rodney Baylis (born 5 November 1947) is an English former cricketer who played six first-class games for Worcestershire in the 1960s. He was born at Redditch, Worcestershire.

After a number of appearances in the second team during 1965, Baylis made his first-class debut against Cambridge University in June 1966. He took four wickets in the match (the first being that of Rupert Roopnaraine), but it was not enough for him to keep his place in the side.

In 1967 he played five times, all in June and July, producing a career-best 4–112 against Essex and claiming 3–77 against Sussex a few days later, but John Snow's wicket in the latter game was the last he took: against Derbyshire the following week he bowled only two wicketless overs.
