= Maggie Baylis =

American graphic designer and author (1912–1997)

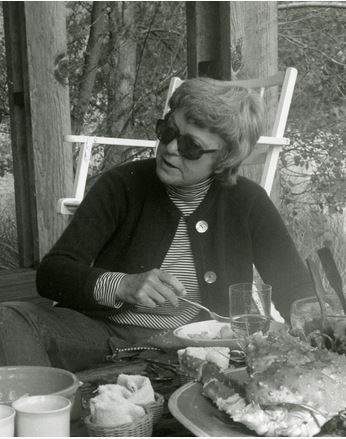
- Portrait of Maggie Baylis, circa 1955
- Born: Margaret Hilbiber; 1912; Tacoma, Washington
- Died: December 10, 1997 (aged 84–85); Sonoma, California
- Occupations: garden writer, architect, graphic designer
- Spouse: Douglas Baylis

Margaret Hilbiber Baylis (1912—December 10, 1997) was an American graphic designer, illustrator, and author of gardening books.

== Early life ==
Margaret Hilbiber was born in Tacoma, Washington in 1912. At age 16 she was accepted as an architecture student at the University of Pennsylvania, one of three women in her cohort. Two years into her studies with the onset of the Great Depression, Maggie had to drop out of the program to support her family by working as an assistant advertising manager at a department store in Tacoma.

== Career ==
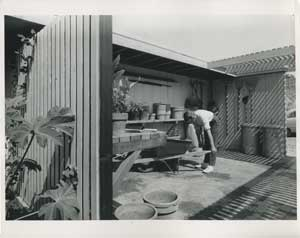
Maggie Baylis in the garden

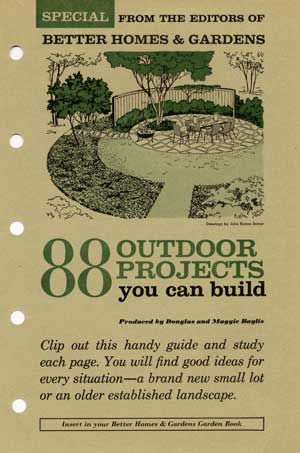
"how-to" guide created by Maggie and Douglas Baylis

During World War II, Baylis left for Hawaii where she worked as a civilian doing graphic design work for Moore Dry Dock Company In 1941 she moved to San Francisco two weeks before the attack on Pearl Harbor and began work as an assistant advertising manager at Sunset magazine, where she worked until 1951. While working for Sunset, she opened her own graphic design studio and hired Douglas Baylis, a landscape architect whom she later married, as her business partner. The Baylis' worked together for 20 years. The Baylis's contributed to Western Landscape Design, House & Garden, Better Homes & Gardens, House Beautiful. At House Beautiful, Baylis created a how-to series with detailed illustrations which were later copied by other magazines for the home gardener. Maggie Baylis was the main force behind the 1948 San Francisco Museum of Art Landscape Design catalog, credited with both the layout and design. When architect Gordon Drake was killed in a skiing accident, Maggie designed and her husband wrote a book entitled California Houses of Gordon Drake. In 1971, she turned her attention to writing and illustrating a dozen books, the most well-known being House Plants for the Purple Thumb. The book capitalized on a nationwide interest in houseplants, teaching new growers easily digestible information on the full range of care needed for success.

Throughout her life Baylis was involved in community affairs. She was on the board of trustees for the Strybing Arboretum, and involved with San Francisco Beautiful, and Telegraph Hill Dwellers. In the about the author section of her book House Plants for the Purple Thumb, Baylis described herself as a "draftsmen, delineator, bread-baker, carpenter, and house plant tender." Her career centered on creating tools for the public to create large and small changes to their built environments.

Baylis died of liver cancer on December 10, 1997.

== Douglas and Maggie Baylis collection ==
Her works were exhibited by the Sonoma League for Historic Preservation in March 2011.

== Books ==
- House Plants for the Purple Thumb. 1973.
- Plant Parenthood. 1974.
- Real Bread: A Fearless Guide to Making It. Cole Group, 1993.

== Bibliography ==
Obniski, Monica and Darrin Alfred. Serious play : design in midcentury America. New Haven: Yale University Press, 2018.
