= Edward Baylis =

British mathematician (1791–1861)

Edward Baylis (1791–1861) was a British mathematician and founder of insurance companies.

== Life ==
Baylis began his career as a clerk in the Alliance Insurance Office. He founded a series of life offices between the years 1838 and 1854, in many of which he acted as manager and actuary. In all he expected results which increasing competition made impossible; shareholders and policyholders were promised advantages which they never enjoyed. As a consequence, all Baylis's offices disappeared quite soon, except the English and Scottish Law.

He was the father of Thomas Baylis. He died in 1861, aged 70, in the Cape of Good Hope, where he had settled in his old age.

== Works ==
Baylis wrote (in 1844) a book on the Arithmetic of Annuities and Life Assurance, adapted more to students.
