= Charles A. Baylis =

American philosopher (1902–1975)

- Born: 2 April 1902; Portland, Oregon
- Died: 30 August 1975 (aged 73)

Education
- Education: University of Washington (AB & AM), Harvard University (PhD)
- Thesis: Creative Synthesis as a Philosophical Concept (1926)

Philosophical work
- Era: 21st-century philosophy
- Region: Western philosophy
- Institutions: Brown University (1927–1949), University of Maryland (1949–1952), Duke University (1952–1970)

Charles Augustus Baylis (1902–1975) was an American philosopher and professor of philosophy at Brown University (1927–1949), University of Maryland (1949–1952), Duke University (1952–1970). He was the managing editor of the Journal of Symbolic Logic.
