= Edward Bayliss =

English cricketer

Edward George Bayliss (5 January 1918 – 21 November 1989) was an English cricketer: a right-handed batsman who played a single first-class match, for Worcestershire in July 1939. He made a "pair" and took no catches. In the 1950s, he played a few times for Worcestershire's Second XI, though with little success.

Bayliss was born in Worcester; he died in Aston Fields, Bromsgrove, Worcestershire at the age of 71.
