= Jerryd Bayless =

American basketball player (born 1988)

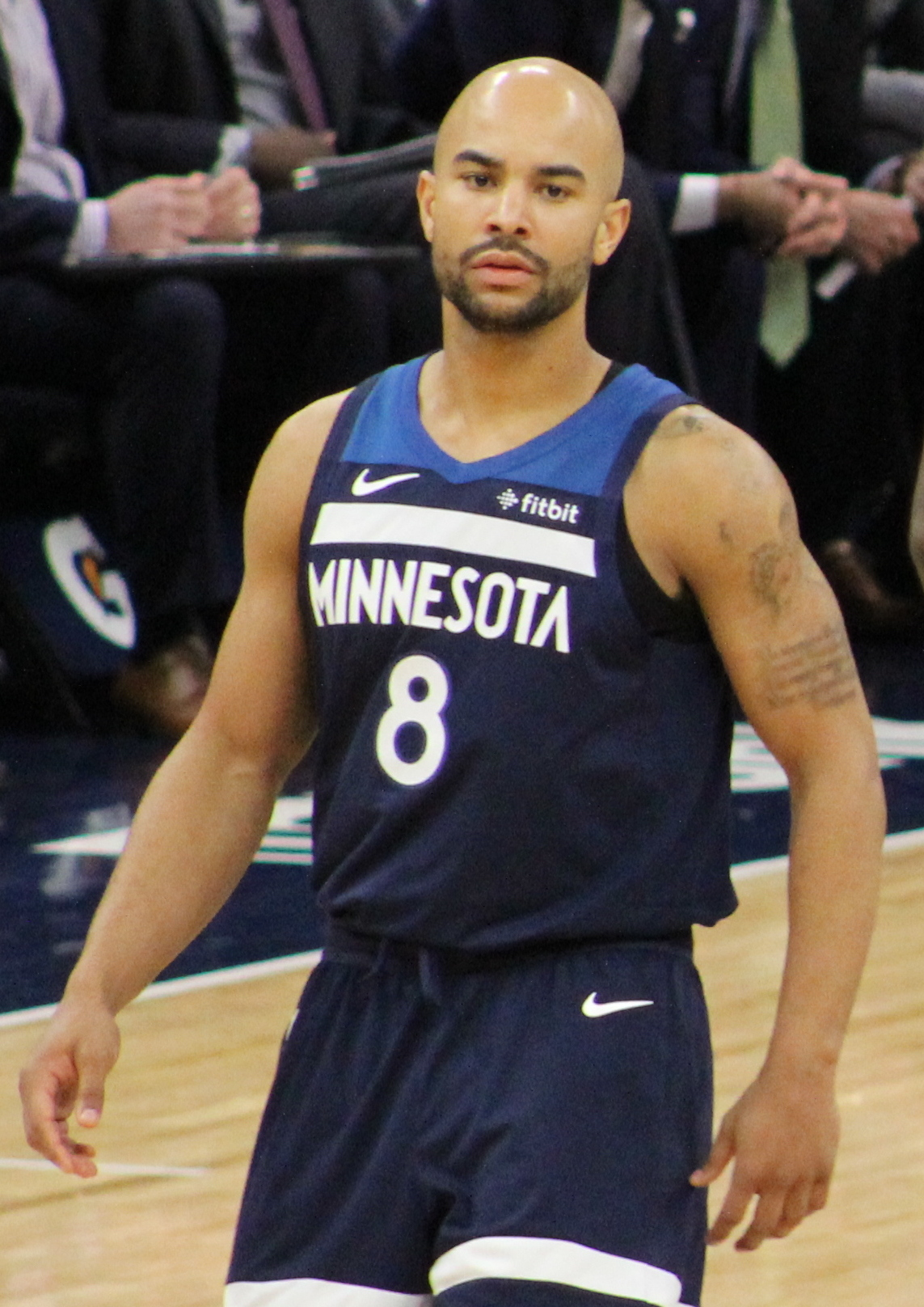
- Bayless with the Minnesota Timberwolves in 2019

Personal information
- Born: August 20, 1988 (age 38) Phoenix, Arizona, U.S.
- Listed height: 6 ft 3 in (1.91 m)
- Listed weight: 200 lb (91 kg)

Career information
- High school: St. Mary's (Phoenix, Arizona)
- College: Arizona (2007–2008)
- NBA draft: 2008: 1st round, 11th overall pick
- Drafted by: Indiana Pacers
- Playing career: 2008–2019
- Position: Point guard / shooting guard
- Number: 4, 32, 5, 7, 11, 19, 0, 8

Career history
- 2008–2010: Portland Trail Blazers
- 2010: New Orleans Hornets
- 2010–2012: Toronto Raptors
- 2012–2014: Memphis Grizzlies
- 2014: Boston Celtics
- 2014–2016: Milwaukee Bucks
- 2016–2018: Philadelphia 76ers
- 2018–2019: Minnesota Timberwolves

Career highlights
- Second-team All-Pac-10 (2008); McDonald's All-American (2007); First-team Parade All-American (2007); Fourth-team Parade All-American (2006)
- Stats at NBA.com
- Stats at Basketball Reference
Medals
Men's basketball
Representing United States
FIBA Americas U18 Championship
Gold medal – first place	2006 San Antonio	Team competition

Jerryd Andrew Bayless (born August 20, 1988) is an American former professional basketball player. He played a year of college basketball for the Arizona Wildcats after playing high school basketball at St. Mary's High School in Phoenix. He was selected 11th overall in the 2008 NBA draft by the Indiana Pacers and was then traded to the Portland Trail Blazers.

== College career ==
As a freshman at Arizona in 2007–08, Bayless led the Wildcats in scoring with average of 19.7 points per game with 45.8% shooting (40.7% 3-point shooting). He also averaged 4.0 assists and 2.7 rebounds and 35.7 minutes per game in 30 games. He became the first freshman in school history to lead Arizona in scoring, as well as the first freshman to win team MVP honors since Sean Elliott did so in 1985–86. He earned multiple awards including All-Pac-10 second team and All-Freshman honors, First Team All-District honors by the National Association of Basketball Coaches (NABC) and United States Basketball Writers Association (USBWA), named Honorable Mention All-America by The Associated Press, and was a finalist for the Wooden Award. The Wildcats finished the regular season with a 19–14 record (8–10 in the Pac-10), making it through to the first round of the NCAA tournament where they lost to West Virginia. On April 5, 2008, he declared for the NBA draft, forgoing his final three years of college eligibility.

== Professional career ==
=== Portland Trail Blazers (2008–2010) ===
Bayless was selected by the Indiana Pacers with the 11th overall pick in the 2008 NBA draft. He was subsequently traded by Indiana with Ike Diogu to the Portland Trail Blazers in exchange for Jarrett Jack, Josh McRoberts, and Brandon Rush on July 9. At the 2008 Las Vegas Summer League, he earned the Most Valuable Player award after leading the league in scoring at 29.8 points per game and leading the Trail Blazers to a 3–2 win–loss record. Bayless made 53 appearances for Portland as a rookie, tallying averages of 4.3 points, 1.1 rebounds, and 1.5 assists.

Bayless scored a career-high 31 points on December 23, 2009, against the San Antonio Spurs, setting a franchise record for points by a Trail Blazer making his first career start. He made 74 appearances (including 11 starts) for the Trail Blazers during the 2009–10 NBA season, recording averages of 8.5 points, 1.6 rebounds, and 2.3 assists.

=== New Orleans Hornets (2010) ===
Bayless was traded by the Trail Blazers to the New Orleans Hornets in exchange for a 2011 first-round draft pick that would become Tobias Harris on October 23, 2010. In 11 appearances for the Hornets, Bayless averaged 4.5 points, 1.4 rebounds, and 2.5 assists.

=== Toronto Raptors (2010–2012) ===
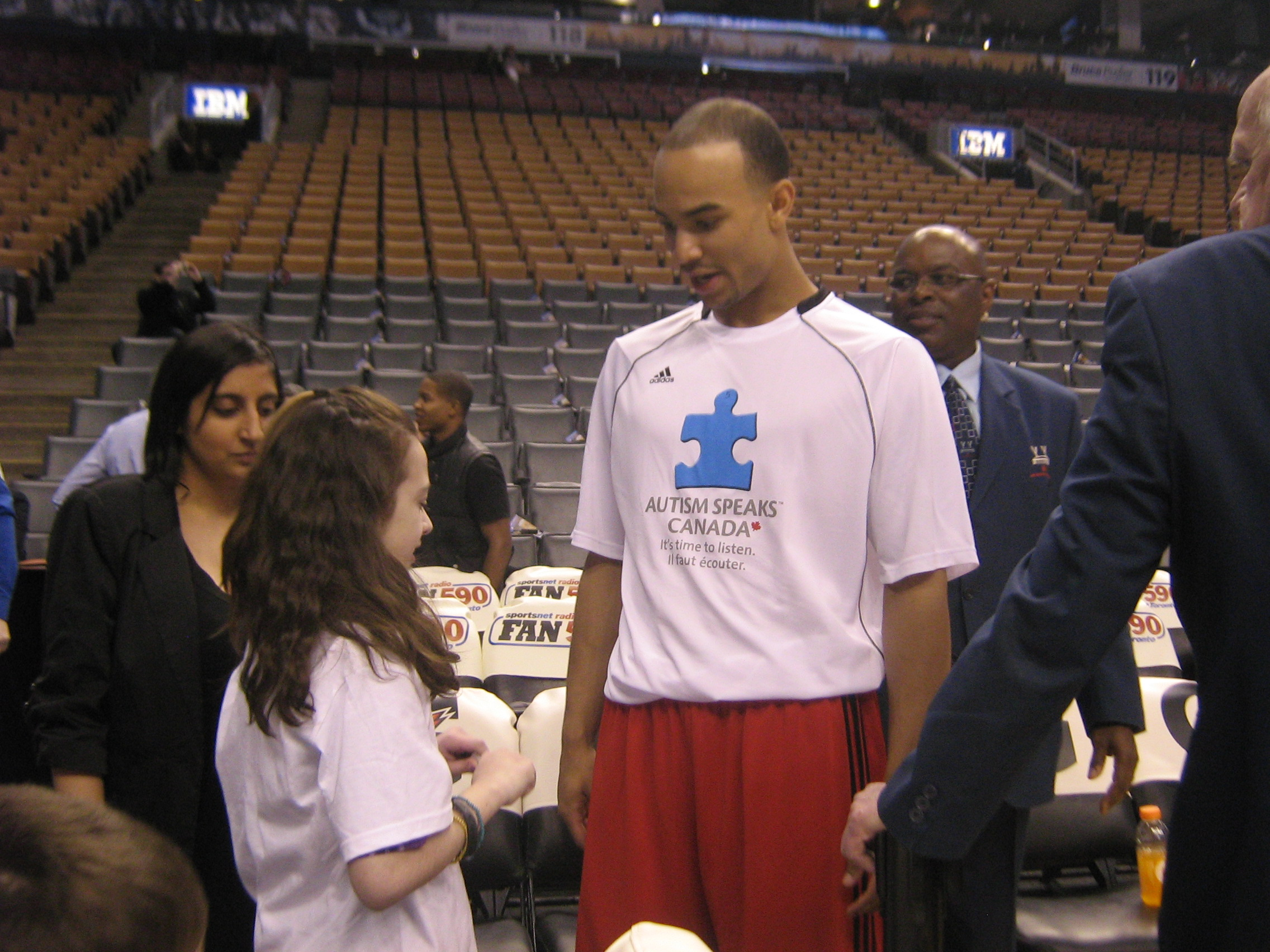
Bayless with the Toronto Raptors in 2011

Bayless was traded by New Orleans with Peja Stojaković to the Toronto Raptors in exchange for David Andersen, Marcus Banks, and Jarrett Jack on November 20, 2010. On December 11, he tied his career-high of 31 points against the Detroit Pistons. Bayless recorded a double-double with 11 points and 10 assists on February 22, 2011, against the Charlotte Bobcats, tying career-highs by shooting 11-of-12 from the free throw line, making him the first NBA player to record a points/assists double-double without a made field goal since Magic Johnson did so in 1996. Bayless made 60 appearances (including 14 starts) for Toronto during the 2010–11 season, averaging 10.0 points, 2.5 rebounds, and 4.0 assists.

In the lockout shortened 2011–12 season, Bayless set career-highs in scoring (11.4 points), assists (3.8), FG% (.424), 3P% (.423) and FT% (.852) in 31 games (11 starts).

=== Memphis Grizzlies (2012–2014) ===
On July 13, 2012, Bayless signed a two-year contract with the Memphis Grizzlies. Bayless made 80 appearances (including four starts) for Memphis during the 2012–13 season, recording averages of 8.7 points, 2.2 rebounds, and 3.3 assists.

On June 30, 2013, Bayless exercised his player option with the Grizzlies for the 2013–14 season. He made 31 appearances (five starts) for the Grizzlies, logging averages of 8.1 points, 1.9 rebounds, and 2.1 assists.

=== Boston Celtics (2014) ===
On January 7, 2014, Bayless was traded to the Boston Celtics in a three-team trade that involved the Grizzlies and the Oklahoma City Thunder. He made 41 appearances (including 14 starts) for the Celtics, recording averages of 10.1 points, 2.1 rebounds, and 3.1 assists.

=== Milwaukee Bucks (2014–2016) ===
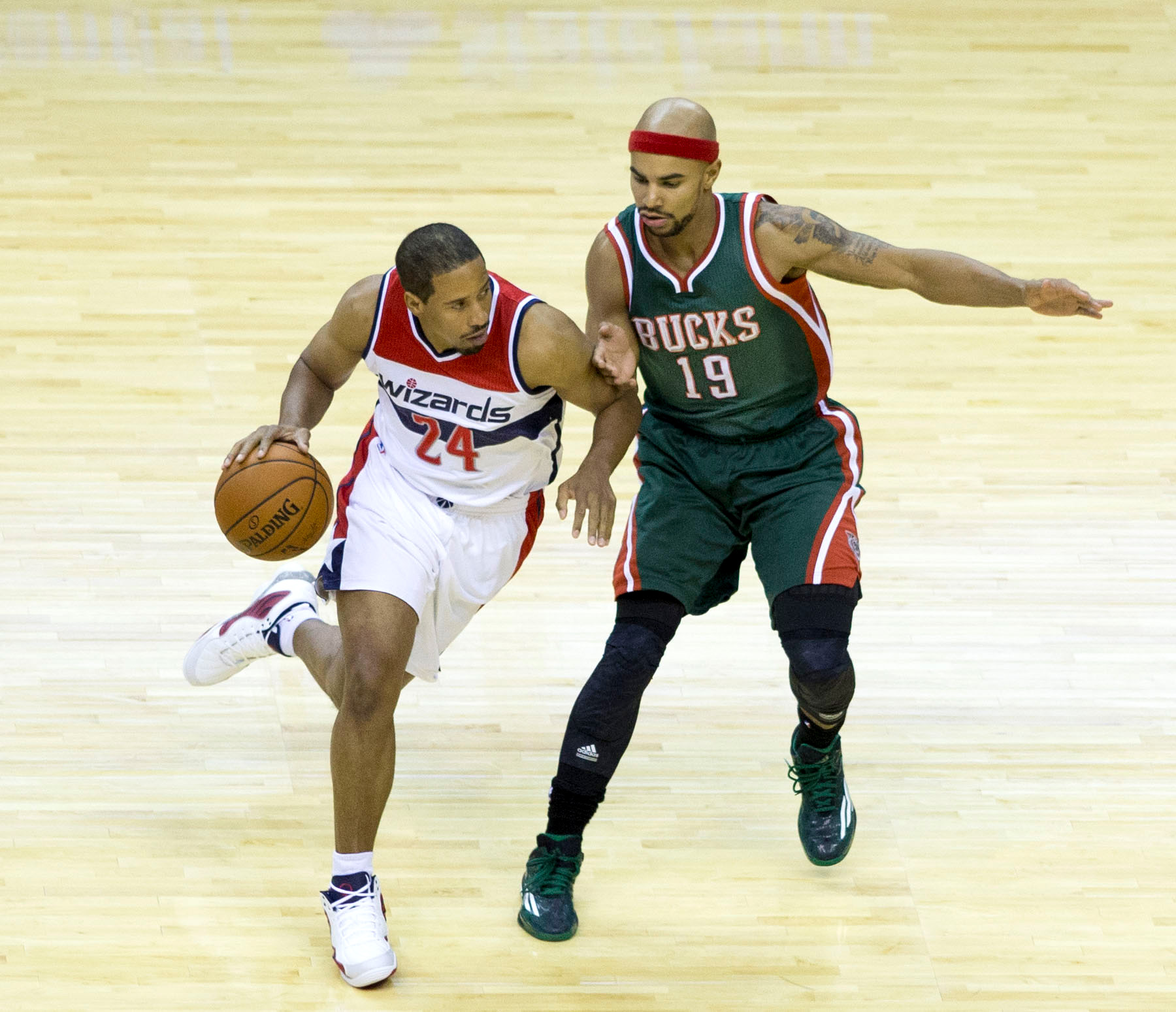
Bayless (right) with the Bucks in 2014

On July 31, 2014, Bayless signed with the Milwaukee Bucks. He had a solid first half of the 2014–15 season before his form dropped post All-Star break. During the season, Bayless was often relied upon to carry a significant load as he knew the system and head coach Jason Kidd's trust. This was especially true in the first week that followed the All-Star break, as newly acquired Michael Carter-Williams was still nursing a toe-injury. In 77 games (four starts) for the team, Bayless averaged 7.8 points, 2.7 rebounds, and 3.0 assists.

On December 28, 2015, Bayless returned to the Bucks' lineup after missing 11 games with a left ankle sprain and led Milwaukee with 19 points and seven assists off the bench in a loss to the Dallas Mavericks. Bayless made 52 appearances (including 18 starts) for Milwaukee during the 2015–16 NBA season, averaging 10.4 points, 2.7 rebounds, and 3.1 assists. In Game 4 of the 2015 playoffs against the Mavericks, Bayless hit a buzzer beater layup to win the game for the Bucks. He later missed six games in early January with the same injury, and a further five games in late February with a left knee injury.

=== Philadelphia 76ers (2016–2018) ===
On July 13, 2016, Bayless signed with the Philadelphia 76ers. Due to a left wrist injury, Bayless was assigned to the Delaware 87ers of the NBA Development League on November 14 for an injury rehabilitation assignment. He was recalled on November 16 and made his season debut for the 76ers on November 21 after missing the first 13 games of the season; he scored four points in 16 minutes against the Miami Heat. He made three appearances for the 76ers before the injury forced him to the sidelines again. On December 15, he was ruled out for the rest of the season after he underwent successful surgery to repair a torn ligament in his left wrist.

Bayless started the first seven games of the 2017–18 season before quickly lost his starting job and then had his thumb injury resurface. After missing six games, he returned to the rotation, but he struggled with his shot and defense. With the young talent that was emerging on the roster, Bayless found himself out of the rotation by mid-January.

Bayless sat out the start of the 2018–19 season to rehabilitate a hyperextended right knee.

=== Minnesota Timberwolves (2018–2019) ===
On November 12, 2018, Bayless was traded to the Minnesota Timberwolves, along with Robert Covington, Dario Šarić, and a 2022 second-round pick, in exchange for Jimmy Butler and Justin Patton. He made his season debut on December 21 against the San Antonio Spurs. On January 30, 2019, he recorded 19 points and a career-high 12 assists in a 99–97 overtime win over the Memphis Grizzlies. It was his first double-double since November 7, 2015, and just the fifth of his career. Bayless made 34 total appearances (including six starts) for the Timberwolves during the 2018–19 NBA season, recording averages of 6.1 points, 1.8 rebounds, and 3.5 assists.

== Career statistics ==
Legend
GP	Games played	GS	Games started	MPG	Minutes per game
FG%	Field goal percentage	3P%	3-point field goal percentage	FT%	Free throw percentage
RPG	Rebounds per game	APG	Assists per game	SPG	Steals per game
BPG	Blocks per game	PPG	Points per game	**Bold**	Career high

=== NBA ===
==== Regular season ====
Year	Team	GP	GS	MPG	FG%	3P%	FT%	RPG	APG	SPG	BPG	PPG
2008–09	Portland	53	0	12.4	.365	.259	.806	1.1	1.5	.3	.0	4.3
2009–10	Portland	74	11	17.6	.414	.315	.831	1.6	2.3	.4	.1	8.5
2010–11	New Orleans	11	0	13.5	.347	.214	.765	1.4	2.5	.2	.1	4.5
2010–11	Toronto	60	14	22.4	**.429**	.348	.810	2.5	4.0	.6	.1	10.0
2011–12	Toronto	31	11	22.7	.424	.423	.852	2.1	3.8	.8	.1	**11.4**
2012–13	Memphis	**80**	4	22.1	.419	.353	.836	2.2	3.3	.7	**.2**	8.7
2013–14	Memphis	31	5	21.0	.377	.301	.789	1.9	2.1	.6	**.2**	8.1
2013–14	Boston	41	14	25.3	.418	.395	.803	2.1	3.1	**1.0**	.1	10.1
2014–15	Milwaukee	77	4	22.3	.426	.308	.883	2.7	3.0	.8	**.2**	7.8
2015–16	Milwaukee	52	**18**	**28.9**	.423	**.437**	.778	2.7	3.1	.9	**.2**	10.4
2016–17	Philadelphia	3	1	23.7	.344	.400	**.900**	**4.0**	**4.3**	.0	.0	11.0
2017–18	Philadelphia	39	11	23.7	.416	.370	.795	2.1	1.4	.6	**.2**	7.9
2018–19	Minnesota	34	6	19.3	.357	.296	.571	1.8	3.5	.5	.1	6.1
Career		586	99	21.4	.411	.361	.818	2.1	2.9	.6	.1	8.4

==== Playoffs ====
Year	Team	GP	GS	MPG	FG%	3P%	FT%	RPG	APG	SPG	BPG	PPG
2009	Portland	2	0	5.5	.333	.000	.667	.5	.0	.0	**.5**	3.0
2010	Portland	6	**2**	**27.7**	**.431**	**.400**	.792	**2.7**	**3.8**	.3	.0	**13.5**
2013	Memphis	**15**	0	21.3	.358	.305	**.885**	2.0	2.1	**.5**	.3	9.3
2015	Milwaukee	6	0	20.0	.343	.286	.765	2.5	3.0	.3	.3	6.5
2018	Philadelphia	1	0	2.0	–	–	–	.0	.0	.0	.0	.0
Career		30	2	20.6	.374	.317	.814	2.1	2.4	.4	.3	8.8

=== College ===
Year	Team	GP	GS	MPG	FG%	3P%	FT%	RPG	APG	SPG	BPG	PPG
2007–08	Arizona	30	30	35.7	.458	.407	.839	2.7	4.0	1.0	.1	19.7

== Honors and awards ==
=== High school ===
- 2007 First-team Parade All-American
- Named to the 2007 USA Basketball Junior National Select Team
- Named to the 2006 USA Men's U18 National Team which went on to win a gold medal in the FIBA World Championship
- Four-time Arizona Republic All-Arizona team selection (2004, 2005, 2006 and 2007)
- 2006 Fourth-team Parade All-American
- Ranked as the No. 9 overall recruit and the No. 2 shooting guard by both Scout.com and Rivals.com.

=== College ===
- 2008 Second-team All-Pac-10
- 2018 University of Arizona Ring of Honor

== See also ==
- 2006 high school boys basketball All-Americans
