= Oklahoma Christian School =

Private school in Oklahoma

Coordinates: 35.65017162277587°N 97.41917308542513°W

Information
- Former name: Christian Center School
- Established: 1970; 56 years ago
- Website: ocssaints.org

Oklahoma Christian School (OCS) is a private Christian school located in Edmond, Oklahoma serving grades Pre K-12. It is accredited by the Association of Christian Schools International (ACSI) and fully recognized by the Oklahoma State Department of Education. OCS is a faith-based school.

== History ==
Oklahoma Christian School, originally known as the "Christian Center School", was founded in the fall of 1970 and operated as an arm of the Christian Conquest Center Church in Oklahoma City. During the 1974–75 school year, the church decided to terminate the school's operation as an arm of the church. Interested parents and teachers decided that the school must continue. The reorganized independent school was incorporated as Oklahoma Christian Schools, Inc. on January 13, 1975.

Thirteen seniors composed the Class of 1976, the school's first. In 1987, OCS moved to the MetroChurch campus in east Edmond, Oklahoma.

After renting facilities for approximately 20 years, OCS completed its first major building project in 1991–92. It included a gym complex, with ten new classrooms added in 1995. The facility also houses a band room, science laboratories, and the middle school administrative offices.

In 2000, after MetroChurch merged with Life Church (also in Edmond), the school began to convert church facilities to fully functional educational facilities.

OCS completed its multi-purpose Student Center at the end of the 2007–2008 school year. This building, the first phase in OCS's campus expansion, houses a cafeteria, band room, classrooms, concession stand, a weight room, football locker rooms, and a secondary gymnasium. The OCS Master Plan includes a long-term expansion plan that will eventually move OCS out of many of its present buildings into new facilities.

== Athletics ==
The school's sports teams are nicknamed the Saints.
