= 2012 NBA Summer League =

- League: National Basketball Association
- Sport: Basketball
- Duration: July 9–22, 2012
- Games: 80 total games Orlando Pro Summer League-20; Las Vegas Summer League-60
- Teams: Orlando-8; Las Vegas-24
- TV partner: NBA TV

Orlando Pro Summer League
- Season champions: Detroit Pistons
- Top scorer: Lance Stephenson

Las Vegas NBA Summer League
- Season champions: Golden State Warriors
- Season MVP: Damian Lillard; Josh Selby (co-MVPs)
- Top scorer: Damian Lillard

NBA Summer League seasons
- ← 2011 2013 →

The 2012 NBA Summer League was a pro basketball league run by the NBA just after the 2012 NBA draft. It took place in Orlando, Florida from July 9 to 13 and in Las Vegas, Nevada from July 13 to 22, 2012. Damian Lillard (Portland Trail Blazers) and Josh Selby (Memphis Grizzlies) won the MVP honors.

== Players ==
A list of players who participated can be viewed here

== Orlando Summer League ==
=== Teams ===
The following is a list of teams that participated in the Orlando Summer League

- Boston Celtics
- Detroit Pistons
- Oklahoma City Thunder
- Utah Jazz
- Indiana Pacers
- Orlando Magic
- Brooklyn Nets
- Philadelphia 76ers

Boxscores and recaps of each game can be viewed here

=== July 9 scores ===
- Orlando Magic beat Brooklyn Nets, 92–88
- Boston Celtics beat Oklahoma City Thunder, 73–65
- Detroit Pistons beat Utah Jazz, 76–73
- Indiana Pacers beat Philadelphia 76ers, 69–63

=== July 10 scores ===
- Utah Jazz beat Philadelphia 76ers, 84–80
- Indiana Pacers beat Oklahoma City Thunder, 78–74
- Detroit Pistons beat Orlando Magic, 79–74
- Boston Celtics beat Brooklyn Nets, 82–73

=== July 11 scores ===
- Boston Celtics beat Indiana Pacers, 85–77
- Oklahoma City Thunder beat Detroit Pistons, 83–62
- Philadelphia 76ers beat Brooklyn Nets, 79–71
- Utah Jazz beat Orlando Magic, 79–75

=== July 12 scores ===
- Detroit Pistons beat Boston Celtics, 93–79
- Oklahoma City Thunder beat Brooklyn Nets, 87–86
- Utah Jazz beat Indiana Pacers, 87–81
- Orlando Magic beat Philadelphia 76ers, 77–75

=== July 13 scores ===
- Utah Jazz beat Oklahoma City Thunder, 89–75
- Boston Celtics beat Orlando Magic, 94–73
- Detroit Pistons beat Philadelphia 76ers, 71–67
- Brooklyn Nets beat Indiana Pacers, 90–77

=== Orlando games standings ===
Team	Wins	Losses	PCT
Detroit Pistons	4	1	0.800
Boston Celtics	4	1	0.800
Oklahoma City Thunder	3	2	0.600
Utah Jazz	3	2	0.600
Indiana Pacers	2	3	0.400
Orlando Magic	2	3	0.400
Brooklyn Nets	1	4	0.200
Philadelphia 76ers	1	4	0.200

== Las Vegas Summer League ==
Box scores and recaps for each game can be viewed here

=== Teams ===
The following is a list of teams that participated in the Las Vegas Summer League.

- Golden State Warriors
- Charlotte Bobcats
- Dallas Mavericks
- Houston Rockets
- Milwaukee Bucks
- Minnesota Timberwolves
- Portland Trail Blazers
- Cleveland Cavaliers
- Miami Heat
- Washington Wizards
- NBA D-League Select
- Atlanta Hawks
- Boston Celtics
- Los Angeles Clippers
- Memphis Grizzlies
- Phoenix Suns
- Sacramento Kings
- San Antonio Spurs
- Toronto Raptors
- Chicago Bulls
- Denver Nuggets
- Los Angeles Lakers
- New Orleans Hornets
- New York Knicks

=== July 13 scores ===
Game result	Top scorer
Hawks 102, Wizards 82	Bradley Beal, 22
Rockets 93, Raptors 81	Donatas Motiejunas-25
Warriors 90, Lakers 50	Klay Thompson-24
Bobcats 121, Kings 87	Byron Mullens- 20

=== July 14 scores ===
Game result	Top scorer
Grizzlies 93, Knicks 77	Josh Selby-20
Warriors 95, Nuggets 74	Charles Jenkins-24
Kings 84, Lakers 72	Josh Akognon-25
Wizards 76, Rockets 70	Jeremy Lamb-26

=== July 15 scores ===
Game result	Top scorer
Suns 99, Knicks 74	Markieff Morris-21
Mavericks 88, Nuggets 77	Dominique Jones-32
Heat 71, Raptors 59	Ed Davis-15
Spurs 82, Hawks 76	Kawhi Leonard-23
Bobcats 68, Cavaliers 64	Tyler Zeller-14
NBA D-League 85, Wizards 78	Bradley Beal-20
Trail Blazers 85, Hornets 82	Damian Lillard-25

=== July 16 scores ===
Game result	Top scorer
Celtics 87, Hawks 69	Kris Joseph, Jared Sullinger 14
Mavs 85, Raptors 75	Ed Davis-23
Rockets 113, Kings 91	Jimmer Fredette-30
Cavs 94, NBA D-League 88	J. R. Smith-21
Heat 106, Lakers 56	Dexter Pittman-14
Wolves 73, Clippers 64	W. Johnson, T. White-16
Bucks 76, Hornets 68	Lance Thomas-22

=== July 17 scores ===
Game result	Top scorer
Nuggets 85, Knicks 81	Jordan Hamilton-21
Wizards 83, Grizzlies 77	Josh Selby-35
Spurs 92, Lakers 81	Kawhi Leonard-27
Rockets 99, Blazers 88	Damian Lillard, Nolan Smith, 27
Cavs 89, Suns 74	Markieff Morris-24
Bulls 79, Celtics 74	Jimmy Walker, E'Twaun Moore, 25
Bobcats 81, Wolves 78	Byron Mullens-33

=== July 18 scores ===
Game result	Top scorer
Wizards 78, Bucks 75	Tobias Harris-24
Rockets 96, Bulls 88	Jimmy Butler-24
Raptors 96, Kings 89	Terrence Ross-21
Hawks 67, Mavs 61	John Jenkins-21
Hornets 78, Suns 61	Brian Roberts-16
Clippers 86, Spurs 80	Adam Morrison-23
Warriors 65, Heat 62	Charles Jenkins-17

=== July 19 scores ===
Game result	Top scorer
Raptors 94, Knicks 92	Chris Copeland- 17
Blazers 84, Hawks 78	Damian Lillard-31
Kings 91, Celtics 82	Jimmer Fredette, Dionte Christmas, 19
Wolves 78, Cavs 65	Derrick Williams- 23
Lakers 75, Clippers 69	Adam Morrison, Christian Eyenga, 22
Bucks 77, NBA D-League 68	Tobias Harris-21
Bobcats 99, Nuggets 86	Jordan Hamilton-21

=== July 20 scores ===
Game result	Top scorer
Cavs 98, Knicks 64	M. Farrakhan, T. Thompson, 13
Blazers 95, Nuggets 82	Damian Lillard-23
Grizzlies 97, Bobcats 79	Josh Selby- 32
Heat 83, Spurs 78	Terrel Harris-25
Warriors 66, Bulls 57	Harrison Barnes-20
NBA D-League 89, Suns 75	Chris Daniels-20
Mavs 78, Hornets 65	Jae Crowder-18

=== July 21 scores ===
Game result	Top scorer
Blazers 81, Heat 55	Will Barton, 27
Mavs 82, Spurs 76 (OT)	Jae Crowder-21
Warriors 80, Hornets 72	Xavier Henry- 21
Wolves 86, NBA D-League 78	Wesley Johnson-28
Bulls 77, Clippers 74	Jimmy Butler-23
Suns 96, Grizzlies 87	Markieff Morris-25
Bucks 88, Celtics 87	Tobias Harris, John Henson, 22

=== July 22 scores ===
Game result	Top scorer
Bucks 113, Bulls 68	Jermaine Taylor-21
Clippers 92, Celtics 77	Adam Morrison-26
Wolves 97, Grizzlies 91	Mike Harris-22

=== Las Vegas standings ===
Team	Wins	Losses	Pct.
Golden State Warriors	5	0	1.000
Charlotte Bobcats	4	1	0.800
Dallas Mavericks	4	1	0.800
Houston Rockets	4	1	0.800
Milwaukee Bucks	4	1	0.800
Minnesota Timberwolves	4	1	0.800
Portland Trail Blazers	4	1	0.800
Cleveland Cavaliers	3	2	0.600
Miami Heat	3	2	0.600
Washington Wizards	3	2	0.600
NBA D-League Select	2	3	0.400
Atlanta Hawks	2	3	0.400
Boston Celtics	2	3	0.400
Los Angeles Clippers	2	3	0.400
Memphis Grizzlies	2	3	0.400
Phoenix Suns	2	3	0.400
Sacramento Kings	2	3	0.400
San Antonio Spurs	2	3	0.400
Toronto Raptors	2	3	0.400
Chicago Bulls	1	4	0.200
Denver Nuggets	1	4	0.200
Los Angeles Lakers	1	4	0.200
New Orleans Hornets	1	4	0.200
New York Knicks	0	5	0.000

== League leaders ==
The league leaders' stats include stats for Orlando and Las Vegas summer leagues.

=== Points ===
Player	Team	Average per game
Damian Lillard	Portland Trail Blazers	26.5
Kawhi Leonard	San Antonio Spurs	25.0
Josh Selby	Memphis Grizzlies	24.2
Jimmy Butler	Chicago Bulls	20.8
Tobias Harris	Milwaukee Bucks	20.8

=== Rebounds ===
Player	Team	Average per game
Malcolm Thomas	Chicago Bulls	12.4
Markieff Morris	Phoenix Suns	9.8
Thomas Robinson	Sacramento Kings	9.8
Ed Davis	Toronto Raptors	9.4
Bernard James	Dallas Mavericks	9.0

=== Assists ===
Player	Team	Average per game
Kendall Marshall	Phoenix Suns	6.5
Kemba Walker	Charlotte Bobcats	5.8
Eric Bledsoe	Los Angeles Clippers	5.7
Scott Machado	Houston Rockets	5.6
Aaron Miles	Milwaukee Bucks	5.6
