= Kenyon Martin =

American basketball player (born 1977)

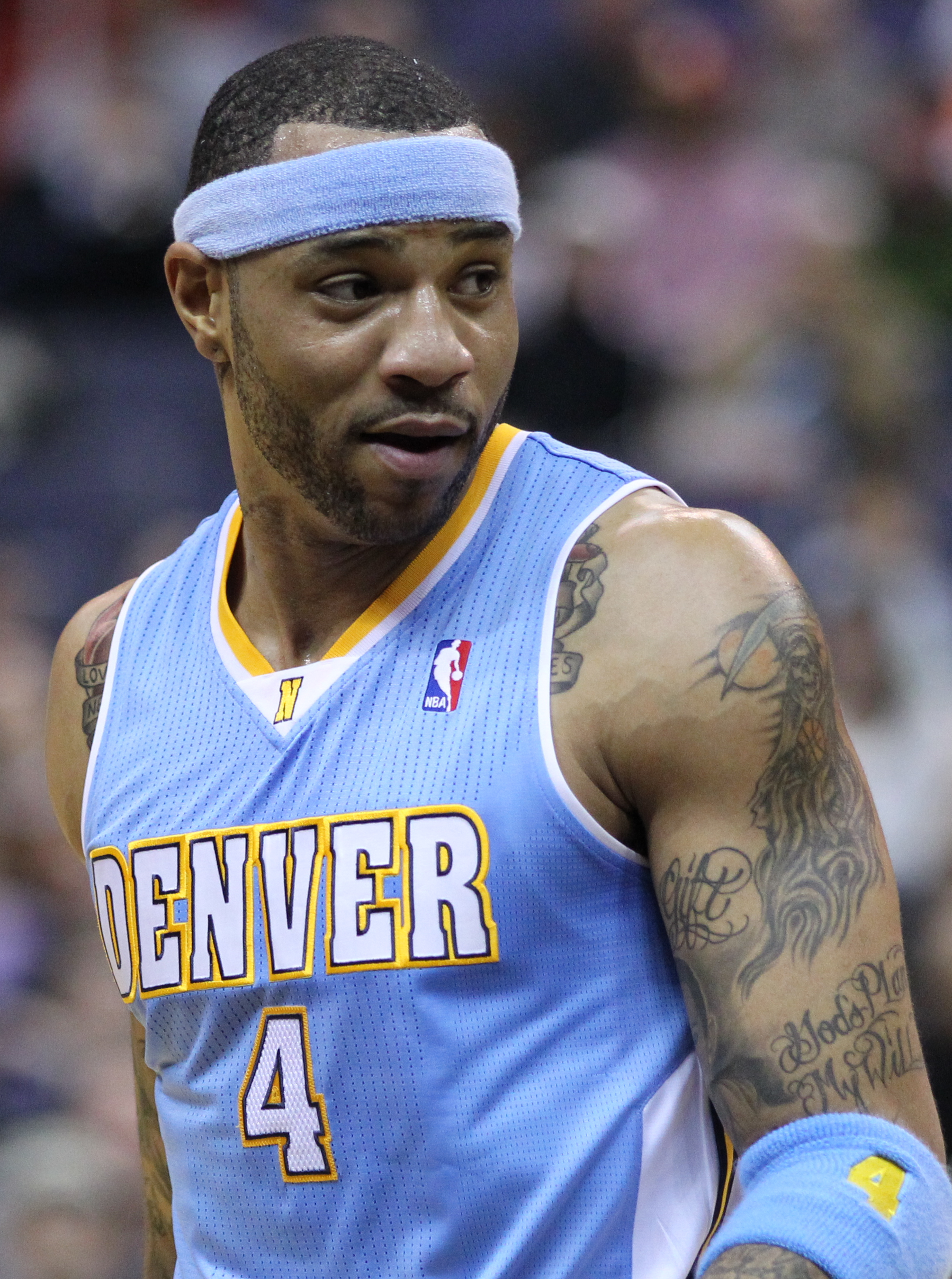
- Martin with the Denver Nuggets in 2011

Personal information
- Born: December 30, 1977 (age 48) Saginaw, Michigan, U.S.
- Listed height: 6 ft 9 in (2.06 m)
- Listed weight: 225 lb (102 kg)

Career information
- High school: Bryan Adams (Dallas, Texas)
- College: Cincinnati (1996–2000)
- NBA draft: 2000: 1st round, 1st overall pick
- Drafted by: New Jersey Nets
- Playing career: 2000–2015
- Position: Power forward
- Number: 6, 4, 2, 3

Career history
- 2000–2004: New Jersey Nets
- 2004–2011: Denver Nuggets
- 2011: Xinjiang Flying Tigers
- 2012: Los Angeles Clippers
- 2013–2014: New York Knicks
- 2015: Milwaukee Bucks

Career highlights
- NBA All-Star (2004); NBA All-Rookie First Team (2001); National college player of the year (2000); Consensus first-team All-American (2000); NABC Defensive Player of the Year (2000); Conference USA Player of the Year (2000); 2× First-team All-Conference USA (1999, 2000); No. 4 retired by Cincinnati Bearcats

Career statistics
- Points: 9,325 (12.3 ppg)
- Rebounds: 5,159 (6.8 rpg)
- Assists: 1,439 (1.9 apg)
- Stats at NBA.com
- Stats at Basketball Reference
Medals
Men's basketball
Representing United States
FIBA Americas Championship
Gold medal – first place	2003 San Juan	National team
Goodwill Games
Gold medal – first place	2001 Brisbane	National team
Summer Universiade
Gold medal – first place	1999 Palma	National team

Kenyon Lee Martin Sr. (born December 30, 1977) is an American former professional basketball player who played 15 seasons in the National Basketball Association (NBA). As a power forward, he played for the New Jersey Nets, Denver Nuggets, Los Angeles Clippers, New York Knicks and Milwaukee Bucks of the NBA, and the Xinjiang Flying Tigers of China. He played college basketball for the Cincinnati Bearcats and was named the national college player of the year during his senior season. Martin was drafted with the first overall pick in the 2000 NBA draft by the New Jersey Nets. He was an NBA All-Star in 2004.

== Early years ==
Martin was born in Saginaw, Michigan, on December 30, 1977, to Lydia Moore, a single mother of two. He has a sister, Tamara, who is 3½ years older. Shortly after, the family moved south to the Oak Cliff neighborhood of Dallas, where Martin's mother worked two jobs. Later, Martin was often watched by his sister while their mother worked.

Martin attended three high schools in four years, but he sought refuge in sports, playing basketball, baseball, and football. In high school, many major universities showed interest in his basketball prowess, but the University of Cincinnati and assistant coach John Loyer recruited him hardest after seeing him play AAU ball after his junior year. He graduated from Bryan Adams High School in Dallas in 1996 (he was named to the school's hall of fame in 2009).

== College career ==
Martin went to the University of Cincinnati and played for the Cincinnati Bearcats under the direction of head coach Bob Huggins. He was homesick early in his freshman year and actually took a bus back home to Dallas. His mother and his older sister, who by then were both working two jobs and attending college, steered him to return to finish college.

By Martin's junior year, he led Cincinnati to a 27–6 record and was named second-team All-Conference USA and, in the summer following, he led the U.S. team to the gold medal in the World University Games, leading the team in scoring and rebounding.

As a senior in 1999–2000, Martin averaged 18.9 points, 9.7 rebounds and 3.5 blocks per game during a season in which the Bearcats were ranked No. 1 for 12 weeks. That season, he recorded his second triple double with 28 points, 13 rebounds, and 10 blocks vs. Memphis (in 1997, he recorded 24/23/10 vs. DePaul). Martin was the consensus National Player of the Year, earning numerous awards from various organizations, and the team was ranked No. 1 in the nation at the conclusion of the regular season. However, Martin suffered a broken leg three minutes into the Bearcats' first game of the Conference USA Tournament, keeping him out of the NCAA Tournament that year. The team finished with a record of 29–4.

Martin remains the Bearcats' all-time leader in career blocked shots (292) and field goal percentage (.586). Cincinnati retired his #4 jersey on April 25, 2000. Later that year, he was selected first overall in the 2000 NBA draft by the New Jersey Nets. As of 2026, Martin remains the last American-born college senior to have been the top overall pick.

Martin graduated with a bachelor's degree in criminal justice.

== Professional career ==
=== New Jersey Nets (2000–2004) ===
Martin's debut game was played on October 31, 2000, in an 86–82 loss to the Cleveland Cavaliers, where he recorded 10 points, seven rebounds and two assists. As a rookie for the New Jersey Nets, Martin averaged 12 points, 7.4 rebounds and 1.7 blocks per game. He was named to the NBA All-Rookie First Team and finished second in voting for NBA Rookie of the Year behind winner Mike Miller.

In his second season, Martin averaged 14.9 points, 5.3 rebounds, 1.3 steals and 1.7 blocks per game in helping the Nets rise from last place in the Atlantic Division to an Eastern Conference title and the best season to date in the Nets' NBA history. Along with Jason Kidd, Kerry Kittles, Keith Van Horn and Richard Jefferson, Martin led the Nets to the 2002 NBA Finals, where they were swept by the Los Angeles Lakers.

On January 29, 2003, Martin recorded a career-best 21 rebounds, while adding 19 points and eight assists, in an 86–78 win over the Washington Wizards. That season, his third in the NBA, Martin again helped his team to the finals, where the Nets lost in six games to the San Antonio Spurs. The next year, Martin averaged 16.7 points, 9.5 rebounds and 1.3 blocks en route to his first NBA All-Star selection, as a backup forward for the Eastern Conference All-Stars. In the 2004 NBA All-Star Game, Martin scored 17 points, grabbed seven rebounds and had three assists.

Martin and teammate Alonzo Mourning almost fought when Martin mocked Mourning's life-threatening kidney disease. Martin later admitted that he had made a mistake and apologized to Mourning. On an episode of the Scoop B Radio Podcast, Martin told Brandon Scoop B Robinson that Mourning thought that Martin should have been working as hard as he was in morning shootarounds, but he was never a shootaround guy. Martin now participates in Mourning's annual charity basketball game (see below "Off the court").

=== Denver Nuggets (2004–2011) ===
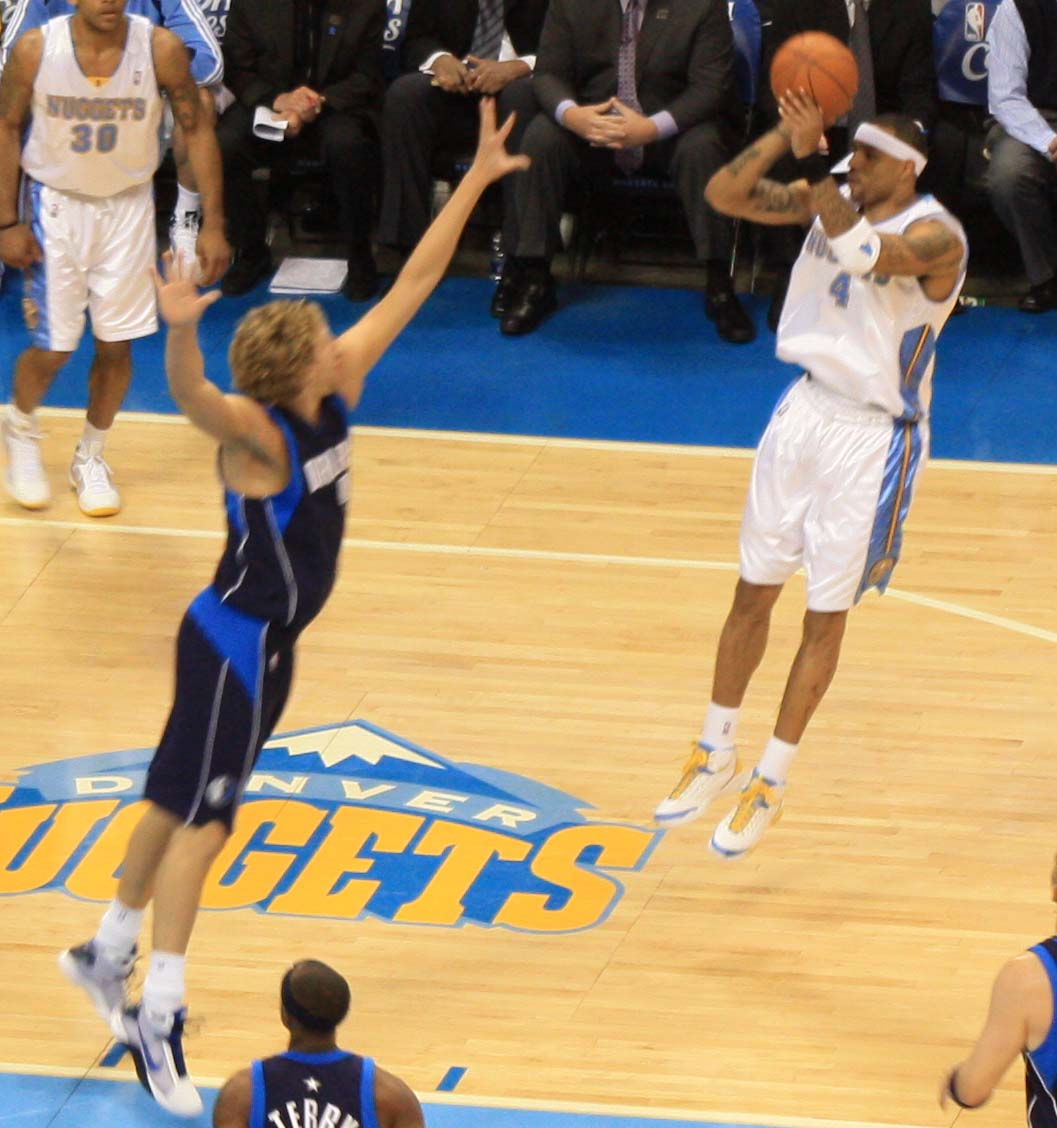
Kenyon Martin shooting over Dirk Nowitzki

Following the 2003–04 season, Martin was traded to the Denver Nuggets for three future first-round draft picks in a sign-and-trade deal, signing a seven-year, $92.5 million contract.

Martin played in 70 games during the 2004–05 season, averaging 15.5 points and 7.3 rebounds; however, a problem with his knee was detected shortly into the off-season, and on May 16, 2005, Kenyon underwent microfracture surgery on his left knee.

During the 2005–06 season, Martin missed 26 games due to knee tendinitis, but was able to return in time for the playoffs. During that playoff series against the Los Angeles Clippers, Martin was suspended from the Denver Nuggets indefinitely for "conduct detrimental to the team." During halftime of game two of the first round series, Martin got into an argument with head coach George Karl over his playing time, and refused to play for the second half of the game. During the offseason, Karl and Martin patched things up.

Believing injuries were behind him, Martin learned the swelling now occurring in his right knee would require another microfracture procedure. On November 15, 2006, after playing two regular season games, Martin underwent his second knee operation in less than two years. Martin is believed to be the first NBA player to have, and to return from, microfracture surgery on both knees.

Martin was fined $15,000 by the NBA when, during the third quarter of a 2006 game against the Chicago Bulls, Martin as well as some of his friends got into a verbal altercation with some fans. He was also cautioned to no longer bring his entourage to games.

To symbolize a fresh start to his career, Kenyon changed his uniform number from 6 to the number 4, which he wore in college, for the 2007–08 season.

=== Xinjiang Flying Tigers (2011) ===
Martin became an unrestricted free agent in the summer of 2011; however, due to the 2011 NBA lockout, he opted to sign a one-year contract with the Xinjiang Flying Tigers of the Chinese Basketball Association. His contract reportedly would have made him the highest paid player in the Chinese league's history. On December 24, 2011, Martin was released from the club so that he could "take care of family affairs". Martin was initially not allowed to return to the NBA until the Flying Tigers' season ended on February 15, 2012, if not later due to the 2012 CBA Playoffs. However, the FIBA granted him an earlier release on February 2.

=== Los Angeles Clippers (2012) ===
On February 3, 2012, Martin signed with the Los Angeles Clippers. In his first game with the Clippers, Martin scored six points and collected four rebounds in a loss to the Cleveland Cavaliers.

=== New York Knicks (2013–2014) ===
On February 21, 2013, Martin agreed to join the New York Knicks on a 10-day contract, which reunited him with Jason Kidd. He officially joined the team on February 23. He was signed to a second 10-day contract on March 5, and signed for the remainder of the season on March 15. Upon his signing, he provided a large amount of help to a Knicks team that was depleted in the frontcourt, replacing Tyson Chandler, who was out with a neck injury, in the Knicks' starting lineup. On July 25, 2013, Martin re-signed with the Knicks for the 2013–14 season.

=== Milwaukee Bucks (2015) ===
On January 9, 2015, Martin signed a 10-day contract with the Milwaukee Bucks. He went on to sign a second 10-day contract on January 19, and a rest-of-season contract on January 29. Martin's final NBA game was on February 2, 2015, in an 82–75 win over the Toronto Raptors where Martin recorded 4 points and 3 rebounds. On February 19, 2015, he was waived by the Bucks.

On July 3, 2015, Martin announced his retirement from professional basketball.

== Career statistics ==
Legend
GP	Games played	GS	Games started	MPG	Minutes per game
FG%	Field goal percentage	3P%	3-point field goal percentage	FT%	Free throw percentage
RPG	Rebounds per game	APG	Assists per game	SPG	Steals per game
BPG	Blocks per game	PPG	Points per game	**Bold**	Career high

=== NBA ===
==== Regular season ====
Year	Team	GP	GS	MPG	FG%	3P%	FT%	RPG	APG	SPG	BPG	PPG
2000–01	New Jersey	68	68	33.4	.445	.091	.630	7.4	1.9	1.1	**1.7**	12.0
2001–02	New Jersey	73	73	34.3	.463	.224	.678	5.3	**2.6**	1.2	**1.7**	14.9
2002–03	New Jersey	**77**	**77**	34.1	.470	.209	.653	8.3	2.4	1.3	.9	**16.7**
2003–04	New Jersey	65	62	**34.6**	.488	.280	.684	9.5	2.5	**1.5**	1.3	**16.7**
2004–05	Denver	70	67	32.5	.490	.000	.646	7.3	2.4	1.4	1.1	15.5
2005–06	Denver	56	49	27.6	.495	.227	.712	6.3	1.4	.8	.9	12.9
2006–07	Denver	2	2	31.5	.500	.000	.250	**10.0**	.5	.0	.0	9.5
2007–08	Denver	71	71	30.4	.538	.182	.580	6.5	1.3	1.2	1.2	12.4
2008–09	Denver	66	66	32.0	.491	**.368**	.604	6.0	2.0	**1.5**	1.1	11.7
2009–10	Denver	58	58	34.2	.456	.276	.557	9.4	1.9	1.2	1.1	11.5
2010–11	Denver	48	48	25.7	.511	.222	.583	6.2	2.3	.9	.7	8.6
2011–12	L.A. Clippers	42	0	22.4	.441	.231	.370	4.3	.4	1.0	1.0	5.2
2012–13	New York	18	11	23.9	**.602**	—	.425	5.3	.4	.9	.9	7.2
2013–14	New York	32	15	19.8	.512	.000	.579	4.2	1.6	.8	.8	4.3
2014–15	Milwaukee	11	0	9.5	.409	—	**1.000**	1.7	.5	.5	.5	1.8
Career		757	667	30.6	.483	.234	.629	6.8	1.9	1.2	1.1	12.3
All-Star		1	0	23.0	.800	.000	.500	7.0	3.0	.0	.0	17.0

==== Playoffs ====
Year	Team	GP	GS	MPG	FG%	3P%	FT%	RPG	APG	SPG	BPG	PPG
2002	New Jersey	**20**	**20**	37.5	.424	**.222**	.691	5.8	**2.9**	1.2	1.3	16.8
2003	New Jersey	**20**	**20**	**38.9**	.453	.091	.693	9.4	**2.9**	1.5	1.6	18.9
2004	New Jersey	11	11	37.2	.533	.000	**.750**	**11.0**	1.1	1.2	1.3	**19.1**
2005	Denver	5	5	32.8	.466	.000	.615	5.6	1.2	1.0	1.0	12.4
2006	Denver	2	0	17.5	.308	—	.500	4.5	.5	**2.0**	1.0	4.5
2008	Denver	4	4	29.5	.441	—	.625	6.3	1.3	1.0	.5	8.8
2009	Denver	16	16	33.6	.497	.200	.657	5.9	2.1	1.1	.9	10.9
2010	Denver	6	6	34.2	.480	.000	.632	8.3	1.3	1.5	1.2	10.0
2011	Denver	5	5	29.6	.480	—	.611	7.8	1.6	.4	.4	11.8
2012	L.A. Clippers	11	0	17.5	.524	—	.625	3.2	.3	.4	**1.7**	4.5
2013	New York	12	1	21.1	**.580**	—	.550	4.5	.9	.8	1.4	5.8
Career		112	88	32.0	.470	.129	.679	6.8	1.8	1.1	1.2	12.9

=== CBA ===
Year	Team	GP	GS	MPG	FG%	3P%	FT%	RPG	APG	SPG	BPG	PPG
2011–12	Xinjiang Flying Tigers	12	11	29.9	.521	.000	.613	9.7	1.8	.8	.6	13.9

== Personal life ==
Martin is the half-brother of former Colorado Buffaloes shooting guard Richard Roby. He is also the cousin of Robert "50" Martin of AND1 Mixtape Tour fame.

Martin's son, Kenyon Martin Jr., played his postgraduate year for the IMG Academy after graduating from the Sierra Canyon School. On March 24, 2020, his son declared for the 2020 NBA draft and was selected 52nd overall by the Sacramento Kings.
