= 2011–12 Memphis Grizzlies season =

- Head coach: Lionel Hollins
- General manager: Chris Wallace
- Owners: Michael Heisley
- Arena: FedExForum

Results
- Record: 41–25 (.621)
- Place: Division: 2nd (Southwest); Conference: 4th (Western)
- Playoff finish: First Round (lost to Clippers 3–4)
- Stats at Basketball Reference

Local media
- Television: Fox Sports Tennessee; Fox Sports Southeast
- Radio: WRBO

The 2011–12 Memphis Grizzlies season was the 17th season of the franchise in the National Basketball Association (NBA), and the 11th for the franchise in Memphis.

== Key dates ==
- June 23: The 2011 NBA draft took place at Prudential Center in Newark, New Jersey.

== Draft picks ==
Round	Pick	Player	Position	Nationality	School
2	49	Josh Selby	PG	United States	University of Kansas

== Roster ==
2011–12 Memphis Grizzlies roster
Players

Pos.	No.	Player	Height	Weight	DOB	From
G/F	9	Tony Allen	6 ft 4 in (1.93 m)	213 lb (97 kg)	1982–01–11	Oklahoma State
G	10	Gilbert Arenas	6 ft 4 in (1.93 m)	215 lb (98 kg)	1982–01–06	Arizona
F	00	Darrell Arthur	6 ft 9 in (2.06 m)	235 lb (107 kg)	1988–03–25	Kansas
G	11	Mike Conley Jr.	6 ft 1 in (1.85 m)	185 lb (84 kg)	1987–10–11	Ohio State
F	44	Dante Cunningham	6 ft 8 in (2.03 m)	230 lb (104 kg)	1987–04–22	Villanova
C	33	Marc Gasol	7 ft 1 in (2.16 m)	265 lb (120 kg)	1985–01–29	Spain
F	22	Rudy Gay	6 ft 8 in (2.03 m)	230 lb (104 kg)	1986–08–17	Connecticut
C	15	Hamed Haddadi	7 ft 2 in (2.18 m)	265 lb (120 kg)	1985–05–19	Iran
G	32	O. J. Mayo	6 ft 4 in (1.93 m)	210 lb (95 kg)	1987–11–05	USC
G	1	Jeremy Pargo	6 ft 2 in (1.88 m)	219 lb (99 kg)	1986–03–17	Gonzaga
F	20	Quincy Pondexter	6 ft 6 in (1.98 m)	225 lb (102 kg)	1988–03–10	Washington
F	50	Zach Randolph	6 ft 9 in (2.06 m)	260 lb (118 kg)	1981–07–16	Michigan State
G	2	Josh Selby (DL)	6 ft 2 in (1.88 m)	183 lb (83 kg)	1991–03–27	Kansas
F/C	5	Marreese Speights	6 ft 10 in (2.08 m)	255 lb (116 kg)	1987–08–04	Florida
G	14	Lester Hudson	6 ft 3 in (1.91 m)	190 lb (86 kg)	1984–08–07	UT Martin

Coaches
Head coach
- Lionel Hollins
Assistant(s)
- Henry Bibby
- Dave Joerger
- Barry Hecker
- Bob Thornton

Legend
- (DP) Unsigned draft pick
- (FA) Free agent
- (S) Suspended
- (DL) On assignment to D-League affiliate
- Injured

Roster
Updated: 2012–04–05

== Pre-season ==
=== Game log ===
2011 pre-season game log
Pre-season: 0–2 (home: 0–1; road: 0–1)

Game	Date	Team	Score	High points	High rebounds	High assists	Location Attendance	Record
1	December 16	New Orleans	L 90–97	Tony Allen (17)	Brian Skinner (9)	Jeremy Pargo (7)	FedExForum	0–1
2	December 21	@ New Orleans	L 80–95	Rudy Gay (20)	Zach Randolph; Sam Young (8)	Mike Conley Jr. (6)	New Orleans Arena	0–2

2011–12 season schedule

== Regular season ==
=== Standings ===
Southwest Division	W	L	PCT	GB	Home	Road	Div	GP
c-San Antonio Spurs	50	16	.758	–	28‍–‍5	22‍–‍11	12–4	66
x-Memphis Grizzlies	41	25	.621	9.0	26‍–‍7	15‍–‍18	7–8	66
x-Dallas Mavericks	36	30	.545	14.0	23‍–‍10	13‍–‍20	8–5	66
Houston Rockets	34	32	.515	16.0	22‍–‍11	12‍–‍21	6–8	66
New Orleans Hornets	21	45	.318	29.0	11‍–‍22	10‍–‍23	3–11	66

Western Conference
#	Team	W	L	PCT	GB	GP
1	c-San Antonio Spurs *	50	16	.758	–	66
2	y-Oklahoma City Thunder *	47	19	.712	3.0	66
3	y-Los Angeles Lakers *	41	25	.621	9.0	66
4	x-Memphis Grizzlies	41	25	.621	9.0	66
5	x-Los Angeles Clippers	40	26	.606	10.0	66
6	x-Denver Nuggets	38	28	.576	12.0	66
7	x-Dallas Mavericks	36	30	.545	14.0	66
8	x-Utah Jazz	36	30	.545	14.0	66
9	Houston Rockets	34	32	.515	16.0	66
10	Phoenix Suns	33	33	.500	17.0	66
11	Portland Trail Blazers	28	38	.424	22.0	66
12	Minnesota Timberwolves	26	40	.394	24.0	66
13	Golden State Warriors	23	43	.348	27.0	66
14	Sacramento Kings	22	44	.333	28.0	66
15	New Orleans Hornets	21	45	.318	29.0	66

=== Game log ===
2011–12 game log
Total: 41–25 (home: 23–7; road: 14–18)
December: 1–2 (home: 1–1; road: 0–1)

Game	Date	Team	Score	High points	High rebounds	High assists	Location Attendance	Record
1	December 26	@ San Antonio	L 82–95	Rudy Gay (19)	Rudy Gay (10)	Mike Conley Jr. (7)	AT&T Center; 18,581	0–1
2	December 28	Oklahoma City	L 95–98	Zach Randolph (24)	Zach Randolph (10)	Jeremy Pargo (7)	FedExForum; 18,119	0–2
3	December 30	Houston	W 113–93	Zach Randolph (23)	Zach Randolph (9)	Josh Selby (7)	FedExForum; 16,069	1–2

January: 10–8 (home: 6–2; road: 4–6)

Game	Date	Team	Score	High points	High rebounds	High assists	Location Attendance	Record
4	January 1	@ Chicago	L 64–104	Sam Young; Josh Davis (10)	Marc Gasol (10)	O. J. Mayo (5)	United Center; 22,763	1–3
5	January 3	Sacramento	W 113–96	Rudy Gay (23)	Marc Gasol (15)	Mike Conley Jr. (7)	FedExForum; 12,391	2–3
6	January 4	@ Minnesota	W 90–86	Tony Allen (20)	Marc Gasol (10)	Mike Conley Jr. (8)	Target Center; 17,404	3–3
7	January 6	@ Utah	L 85–94	Tony Allen (21)	Marc Gasol (11)	Mike Conley Jr. (6)	EnergySolutions Arena; 19,503	3–4
8	January 8	@ L. A. Lakers	L 82–90	Rudy Gay (19)	Marc Gasol (11)	Mike Conley Jr. (8)	Staples Center; 18,997	3–5
9	January 10	Oklahoma City	L 95–100	Marc Gasol (20)	Marc Gasol (14)	Mike Conley Jr. (10)	FedExForum; 13,601	3–6
10	January 12	New York	W 94–83	Rudy Gay (26)	Marc Gasol (12)	Mike Conley Jr. (7)	FedExForum; 15,234	4–6
11	January 14	New Orleans	W 108–99	Rudy Gay (23)	Marc Gasol (11)	Mike Conley Jr. (7)	FedExForum; 14,983	5–6
12	January 16	Chicago	W 102–86	Rudy Gay (24)	Marreese Speights (12)	Mike Conley Jr. (8)	FedExForum; 18,119	6–6
13	January 18	@ New Orleans	W 93–87	Marc Gasol (22)	Marc Gasol (12)	Mike Conley Jr. (10)	New Orleans Arena; 12,045	7–6
14	January 20	@ Detroit	W 98–81	Rudy Gay (24)	Marc Gasol (6)	Mike Conley Jr. (11)	The Palace of Auburn Hills; 10,255	8–6
15	January 21	Sacramento	W 128–95	Rudy Gay (23)	Marreese Speights (15)	Mike Conley Jr. (6)	FedExForum; 16,562	9–6
16	January 23	@ Golden State	W 91–90	Rudy Gay (23)	Marc Gasol (11)	Mike Conley Jr. (9)	Oracle Arena; 17,549	10–6
17	January 24	@ Portland	L 84–97	O. J. Mayo (20)	Marreese Speights (6)	Mike Conley Jr. (7)	Rose Garden; 20,602	10–7
18	January 26	@ L.A. Clippers	L 91–98	Rudy Gay (24)	Marc Gasol (11)	Mike Conley Jr. (7)	Staples Center; 19,275	10–8
19	January 28	@ Phoenix	L 84–86	Rudy Gay; Marc Gasol (18)	Marc Gasol (13)	Mike Conley Jr. (10)	US Airways Center; 14,903	10–9
20	January 30	San Antonio	L 73–83	O. J. Mayo (17)	Marc Gasol (12)	Mike Conley Jr. (3)	FedExForum; 15,118	10–10
21	January 31	Denver	W 100–97 (OT)	Rudy Gay; Marc Gasol (20)	Rudy Gay; Marc Gasol (13)	Mike Conley Jr. (6)	FedExForum; 13,651	11–10

February: 9–5 (home: 7–2; road: 2–3)

Game	Date	Team	Score	High points	High rebounds	High assists	Location Attendance	Record
22	February 2	@ Atlanta	W 96–77	Rudy Gay (21)	Dante Cunningham (12)	Mike Conley Jr. (6)	Philips Arena; 14,211	12–10
23	February 3	@ Oklahoma City	L 94–101	Marc Gasol (24)	Marc Gasol; Rudy Gay (8)	Mike Conley Jr. (5)	Chesapeake Energy Arena; 18,203	12–11
24	February 5	@ Boston	L 80–98	Rudy Gay (21)	Rudy Gay (7)	Mike Conley Jr. (4)	TD Garden (18,624)	12–12
25	February 6	San Antonio	L 84–89	Marc Gasol (22)	Marc Gasol (9)	Mike Conley Jr. (8)	FedExForum; 13,527	12–13
26	February 8	Minnesota	W 85–80	Rudy Gay (19)	Marreese Speights (15)	Mike Conley Jr. (7)	FedExForum; 13,287	13–13
27	February 10	Indiana	W 98–92	Rudy Gay (21)	Marreese Speights (9)	Mike Conley Jr. (6)	FedExForum; 16,281	14–13
28	February 12	Utah	L 88–98	Rudy Gay (22)	Marreese Speights (11)	Mike Conley Jr. (6)	FedExForum; 14,424	14–14
29	February 14	Houston	W 93–83	Mike Conley Jr. (21)	Rudy Gay (8)	Mike Conley Jr. (4)	FedExForum; 13,042	15–14
30	February 15	@ New Jersey	W 105–100	Rudy Gay (25)	Marreese Speights (18)	Mike Conley Jr. (10)	Prudential Center; 10,885	16–14
31	February 17	Denver	W 103–102	Rudy Gay (20)	Marc Gasol (14)	Marc Gasol (8)	FedExForum; 15,201	17–14
32	February 18	Golden State	W 104–103	Rudy Gay (19)	Marc Gasol (13)	Mike Conley Jr. (6)	FedExForum; 17,151	18–14
33	February 20	@ Houston	L 93–97	Rudy Gay (23)	Three players (7)	Marc Gasol (5)	Toyota Center; 12,525	18–15
34	February 21	Philadelphia	W 89–76	Marc Gasol (15)	Marc Gasol (14)	Marc Gasol (7)	FedExForum; 14,258	19–15
All-Star Break
35	February 29	Dallas	W 96–85	Marc Gasol (22)	Marc Gasol (11)	Mike Conley Jr. (10)	FedExForum; 17,023	20–15

March : 8–7 (home: 3–2; road: 5–5)

Game	Date	Team	Score	High points	High rebounds	High assists	Location Attendance	Record
36	March 2	@ Toronto	W 102–99	Rudy Gay (23)	Rudy Gay (12)	Mike Conley Jr. (5)	Air Canada Centre; 17,168	21–15
37	March 3	Detroit	W 100–83	Marc Gasol; O. J. Mayo (17)	Marc Gasol (9)	Mike Conley Jr. (12)	FedExForum; 17,569	22–15
38	March 7	@ Golden State	W 110–92	Rudy Gay (26)	Marc Gasol; Rudy Gay (12)	Mike Conley Jr. (12)	Oracle Arena; 19,171	23–15
39	March 10	@ Phoenix	L 91–98	Marc Gasol (21)	Marc Gasol (8)	Mike Conley Jr. (10)	US Airways Center; 16,350	23–16
40	March 11	@ Denver	W 94–91	O. J. Mayo (22)	Marreese Speights (9)	O. J. Mayo (8)	Pepsi Center; 17,737	24–16
41	March 13	L. A. Lakers	L 111–116 (OT)	Marreese Speights (25)	Marc Gasol (11)	Mike Conley Jr. (11)	FedExForum; 18,119	24–17
42	March 16	Toronto	L 110–114 (OT)	Marc Gasol (28)	Rudy Gay (11)	Mike Conley Jr. (10)	FedExForum; 17,239	24–18
43	March 18	Washington	W 97–92	Rudy Gay (27)	Three players (9)	Mike Conley Jr. (6)	FedExForum; 15,412	25–18
44	March 20	@ Sacramento	L 110–119	Rudy Gay (23)	Marc Gasol (10)	Mike Conley Jr. (9)	Power Balance Pavilion; 11,105	25–19
45	March 22	@ Portland	L 93–97	Marc Gasol (22)	Marc Gasol (9)	Tony Allen (6)	Rose Garden; 20,636	25–20
46	March 24	@ L. A. Clippers	L 85–101	Zach Randolph (14)	Marc Gasol; Zach Randolph (8)	Mike Conley Jr. (9)	Staples Center; 19,060	25–21
47	March 25	@ L. A. Lakers	W 102–96	Rudy Gay (18)	Zach Randolph (12)	Mike Conley Jr. (8)	Staples Center; 18,997	26–21
48	March 27	Minnesota	W 93–86	Rudy Gay (21)	Dante Cunningham (14)	Mike Conley Jr. (8)	FedExForum; 14,769	27–21
49	March 30	@ Houston	L 89–98	Rudy Gay (20)	Marc Gasol (9)	O. J. Mayo (4)	Toyota Center; 16,884	27–22
50	March 31	@ Milwaukee	W 99–95	O. J. Mayo (24)	Marc Gasol (15)	O. J. Mayo (3)	Bradley Center; 17,106	28–22

April : 13–3 (home: 9–0; road: 4–3)

Game	Date	Team	Score	High points	High rebounds	High assists	Location Attendance	Record
51	April 2	@ Oklahoma City	W 94–88	O. J. Mayo (22)	Marreese Speights (13)	O. J. Mayo; Zach Randolph (4)	Chesapeake Energy Arena; 18,203	29–22
52	April 3	Golden State	W 98–94	O. J. Mayo (19)	Tony Allen (7)	Marc Gasol (6)	FedExForum; 14,310	30–22
53	April 4	@ Dallas	L 85–95	O. J. Mayo (17)	Marc Gasol (10)	Marc Gasol (7)	American Airlines Center; 20,233	30–23
54	April 6	@ Miami	W 97–82	Rudy Gay (17)	Zach Randolph (14)	O. J. Mayo (6)	American Airlines Arena; 20,008	31–23
55	April 7	Dallas	W 94–89	Rudy Gay (25)	Zach Randolph (11)	Mike Conley Jr. O. J. Mayo (5)	FedExForum; 18,119	32–23
56	April 9	L. A. Clippers	W 94–85	Marc Gasol (18)	Zach Randolph (12)	Marc Gasol (7)	FedExForum; 17,219	33–23
57	April 11	Phoenix	W 104–93	Rudy Gay (32)	Zach Randolph (9)	Mike Conley Jr. (7)	FedExForum; 15,239	34–23
58	April 12	@ San Antonio	L 97–107	Rudy Gay (19)	Zach Randolph (11)	Mike Conley Jr. Rudy Gay (4)	AT&T Center; 18,581	34–24
59	April 14	Utah	W 103–98	Rudy Gay (26)	Rudy Gay (12)	Mike Conley Jr. (6)	FedExForum; 17,190	35–24
60	April 15	@ New Orleans	L 75–88	Rudy Gay (24)	Zach Randolph (13)	Three players (3)	New Orleans Arena; 15,570	35–25
61	April 17	@ Minnesota	W 91–84	Rudy Gay (28)	Zach Randolph (11)	Mike Conley Jr. (8)	Target Center; 16,709	36–25
62	April 18	New Orleans	W 103–91	Rudy Gay (26)	Zach Randolph (6)	Mike Conley Jr. (5)	FedExForum; 14,507	37–25
63	April 20	@ Charlotte	W 85–80	Mike Conley Jr. (20)	Rudy Gay; Zach Randolph (6)	Mike Conley Jr. (7)	Time Warner Cable Arena; 13,428	38–25
64	April 21	Portland	W 93–89	Rudy Gay (21)	Marreese Speights (11)	Marc Gasol (4)	FedExForum; 17,904	39–25
65	April 23	Cleveland	W 109–101	Marreese Speights; Marc Gasol (17)	Marreese Speights (10)	O. J. Mayo (5)	FedExForum; 15,504	40–25
66	April 26	Orlando	W 88–76	Marc Gasol (22)	Zach Randolph (12)	O. J. Mayo (6)	FedExForum; 17,215	41–25

2011–12 season schedule

== Playoffs ==
=== Game log ===
2012 playoff game log
Total: 3–4 (home: 2–2; road: 1–2)
First Round: 3–4 (home: 2–2; road: 1–2)

Game	Date	Team	Score	High points	High rebounds	High assists	Location Attendance	Series
1	April 29	L. A. Clippers	L 98–99	Rudy Gay (19)	Marreese Speights (9)	Mike Conley Jr. (8)	FedEx Forum; 18,119	0–1
2	May 2	L. A. Clippers	W 105–98	Rudy Gay (21)	Zach Randolph (8)	Mike Conley Jr. (6)	FedEx Forum; 18,119	1–1
3	May 5	@ L. A. Clippers	L 86–87	Rudy Gay (24)	Marc Gasol (10)	Mike Conley Jr. (8)	Staples Center; 19,060	1–2
4	May 7	@ L. A. Clippers	L 97–101	Mike Conley Jr. (25)	Zach Randolph (9)	Mike Conley Jr. (8)	Staples Center; 19,167	1–3
5	May 9	L. A. Clippers	W 92–80	Marc Gasol (23)	Zach Randolph (10)	Mike Conley Jr. (6)	FedEx Forum; 18,119	2–3
6	May 11	@ L. A. Clippers	W 90–88	Marc Gasol (23)	Zach Randolph (16)	Mike Conley Jr. (9)	Staples Center; 19,060	3–3
7	May 13	L. A. Clippers	L 72–82	Rudy Gay; Marc Gasol (19)	Zach Randolph (12)	Mike Conley Jr. (5)	FedEx Forum; 18,119	3–4

2012 playoff schedule

== Player statistics ==
=== Regular season ===
Player	POS	GP	GS	MP	REB	AST	STL	BLK	PTS	MPG	RPG	APG	SPG	BPG	PPG
O. J. Mayo	SG	66	0	1,771	210	169	71	23	833	26.8	3.2	2.6	1.1	.3	12.6
Rudy Gay	SF	65	65	2,422	417	147	95	55	1,232	37.3	6.4	2.3	1.5	.8	19.0
Marc Gasol	C	65	65	2,370	579	204	62	121	952	36.5	8.9	3.1	1.0	1.9	14.6
Quincy Pondexter	SF	64	8	1,002	126	27	27	5	271	15.7	2.0	.4	.4	.1	4.2
Dante Cunningham	PF	64	5	1,124	246	37	42	34	333	17.6	3.8	.6	.7	.5	5.2
Mike Conley Jr.	PG	62	61	2,174	156	404	136	11	788	35.1	2.5	6.5	2.2	.2	12.7
Marreese Speights	PF	60	54	1,345	374	48	21	29	526	22.4	6.2	.8	.4	.5	8.8
Tony Allen	SG	58	57	1,525	233	79	104	33	568	26.3	4.0	1.4	1.8	.6	9.8
Jeremy Pargo	PG	44	5	424	37	55	15	0	126	9.6	.8	1.3	.3	.0	2.9
Hamed Haddadi	C	35	0	206	71	8	1	26	70	5.9	2.0	.2	.0	.7	2.0
Zach Randolph	PF	28	8	735	225	48	21	4	324	26.3	8.0	1.7	.8	.1	11.6
Josh Selby	PG	28	0	237	15	30	7	0	63	8.5	.5	1.1	.3	.0	2.3
Sam Young^{†}	SF	21	2	240	41	9	11	2	74	11.4	2.0	.4	.5	.1	3.5
Gilbert Arenas	PG	17	0	211	18	18	11	1	72	12.4	1.1	1.1	.6	.1	4.2
Josh Davis	PF	15	0	130	27	6	7	1	28	8.7	1.8	.4	.5	.1	1.9
Lester Hudson^{†}	PG	3	0	20	0	1	0	0	9	6.7	.0	.3	.0	.0	3.0
Brian Skinner	C	1	0	4	0	0	0	0	0	4.0	.0	.0	.0	.0	.0

- ^{†} Denotes player spent time with another team in the season. Stats reflect time with the Grizzlies only.

=== Playoffs ===
Player	POS	GP	GS	MP	REB	AST	STL	BLK	PTS	MPG	RPG	APG	SPG	BPG	PPG
Rudy Gay	SF	7	7	279	46	10	9	2	133	39.9	6.6	1.4	1.3	.3	19.0
Mike Conley Jr.	PG	7	7	277	23	50	6	0	99	39.6	3.3	7.1	.9	.0	14.1
Marc Gasol	C	7	7	261	47	22	2	13	106	37.3	6.7	3.1	.3	1.9	15.1
Zach Randolph	PF	7	7	248	69	6	7	4	96	35.4	9.9	.9	1.0	.6	13.7
Tony Allen	SG	7	7	170	22	5	9	7	48	24.3	3.1	.7	1.3	1.0	6.9
O. J. Mayo	SG	7	0	163	25	15	9	1	62	23.3	3.6	2.1	1.3	.1	8.9
Quincy Pondexter	SF	7	0	114	16	2	4	0	33	16.3	2.3	.3	.6	.0	4.7
Marreese Speights	PF	7	0	100	30	2	3	3	46	14.3	4.3	.3	.4	.4	6.6
Dante Cunningham	PF	7	0	49	11	0	1	2	8	7.0	1.6	.0	.1	.3	1.1
Gilbert Arenas	PG	6	0	23	1	1	0	0	4	3.8	.2	.2	.0	.0	.7
Hamed Haddadi	C	4	0	21	9	1	0	2	5	5.3	2.3	.3	.0	.5	1.3
Josh Selby	PG	1	0	0	0	0	0	0	0	.0	.0	.0	.0	.0	.0

== Milestones ==
- April 26: Memphis set a franchise record for regular-season winning percentage (.621). The Grizzlies' previous best regular-season mark was .610, which they set during the 2003–04 season.
