= 2011–12 New Orleans Hornets season =

- Head coach: Monty Williams
- General manager: Dell Demps
- Owners: NBA
- Arena: New Orleans Arena

Results
- Record: 21–45 (.318)
- Place: Division: 5th (Southwest); Conference: 15th (Western)
- Playoff finish: Did not qualify
- Stats at Basketball Reference

Local media
- Television: Cox Sports Television
- Radio: KMEZ

The 2011–12 New Orleans Hornets season was the tenth (Note: At the time, this season was considered the 24th season in franchise history, being viewed as a relocation from Charlotte. In 2014, after this team was rebranded as the Pelicans, the name and the statistical history of the original team was reclaimed by the present day Charlotte Hornets, who had begun play in 2004 as an expansion team known as the Charlotte Bobcats.) season of the franchise in the National Basketball Association (NBA). For the first time since the 2004–05 season, Chris Paul was not on the roster as he was traded to the Los Angeles Clippers during the lockout. Paul was supposed to be traded to the Los Angeles Lakers, but then-commissioner David Stern vetoed the trade. The post-Paul era Hornets finished the shortened season with a 21–45 record, last in the Western Conference.

== Key dates ==
- June 23: The 2011 NBA draft took place at Prudential Center in Newark, New Jersey.

== Draft picks ==
Round	Pick	Player	Position	Nationality	College/Team
2	45	Josh Harrellson	C	United States	Kentucky

The Hornets entered the draft with one second-round selection. They have already traded their original first- and second-round picks to the Portland Trail Blazers (eventually held by the Charlotte Hornets on draft night) and the Philadelphia 76ers, respectively.

== Roster ==
2011–12 New Orleans Hornets roster
Players

Pos.	No.	Player	Height	Weight	DOB	From
SF	0	Al-Farouq Aminu	6 ft 9 in (2.06 m)	215 lb (98 kg)	1990-09-21	Wake Forest
SF	1	Trevor Ariza	6 ft 8 in (2.03 m)	210 lb (95 kg)	1985-07-30	UCLA
PF	15	Gustavo Ayón	6 ft 10 in (2.08 m)	250 lb (113 kg)	1985-04-01	San José State
SG	8	Marco Belinelli	6 ft 5 in (1.96 m)	195 lb (88 kg)	1986-03-25	Italy
SG	10	Eric Gordon	6 ft 3 in (1.91 m)	215 lb (98 kg)	1988-12-25	Indiana
SG	4	Xavier Henry	6 ft 6 in (1.98 m)	220 lb (100 kg)	1991-03-15	Kansas
PG	2	Jarrett Jack	6 ft 3 in (1.91 m)	197 lb (89 kg)	1983-10-28	Georgia Tech
C	35	Chris Kaman	7 ft 0 in (2.13 m)	265 lb (120 kg)	1982-04-28	Central Michigan
PF	24	Carl Landry	6 ft 9 in (2.06 m)	248 lb (112 kg)	1983-09-19	Purdue
C	50	Emeka Okafor	6 ft 10 in (2.08 m)	255 lb (116 kg)	1982-09-28	Connecticut
PF	14	Jason Smith	7 ft 0 in (2.13 m)	240 lb (109 kg)	1986-03-02	Colorado State
PF	42	Lance Thomas	6 ft 8 in (2.03 m)	225 lb (102 kg)	1988-04-24	Duke
PG	21	Greivis Vásquez	6 ft 6 in (1.98 m)	211 lb (96 kg)	1987-01-16	Maryland
C	31	Darryl Watkins	6 ft 11 in (2.11 m)	258 lb (117 kg)	1984-11-08	Syracuse

Coaches
Head coach
- Monty Williams
Assistant(s)
- Randy Ayers
- James Borrego
- Bryan Gates
- Bob Hill

Legend
- (DP) Unsigned draft pick
- (FA) Free agent
- (S) Suspended
- (DL) On assignment to D-League affiliate
- Injured

Roster
Updated: April 18, 2012

== Pre-season ==
Due to the 2011 NBA lockout negotiations, the programmed pre-season schedule, along with the first two weeks of the regular season were scrapped, and a two-game pre-season was set for each team once the lockout concluded.

2011 pre-season game log
Pre-season: 2–0 (home: 1–0; road: 1–0)

Game	Date	Team	Score	High points	High rebounds	High assists	Location Attendance	Record
1	December 16	@ Memphis	W 97–90	Jarrett Jack (24)	Lance Thomas (8)	Jarrett Jack (6)	FedEx Forum; 11,259	1–0
2	December 21	Memphis	W 95–80	Chris Kaman (18)	Quincy Pondexter (12)	Jarrett Jack (8)	New Orleans Arena; 11,895	2–0

2011–12 season schedule

== Regular season ==
=== Standings ===
Southwest Division	W	L	PCT	GB	Home	Road	Div	GP
c-San Antonio Spurs	50	16	.758	–	28‍–‍5	22‍–‍11	12–4	66
x-Memphis Grizzlies	41	25	.621	9.0	26‍–‍7	15‍–‍18	7–8	66
x-Dallas Mavericks	36	30	.545	14.0	23‍–‍10	13‍–‍20	8–5	66
Houston Rockets	34	32	.515	16.0	22‍–‍11	12‍–‍21	6–8	66
New Orleans Hornets	21	45	.318	29.0	11‍–‍22	10‍–‍23	3–11	66

Western Conference
#	Team	W	L	PCT	GB	GP
1	c-San Antonio Spurs *	50	16	.758	–	66
2	y-Oklahoma City Thunder *	47	19	.712	3.0	66
3	y-Los Angeles Lakers *	41	25	.621	9.0	66
4	x-Memphis Grizzlies	41	25	.621	9.0	66
5	x-Los Angeles Clippers	40	26	.606	10.0	66
6	x-Denver Nuggets	38	28	.576	12.0	66
7	x-Dallas Mavericks	36	30	.545	14.0	66
8	x-Utah Jazz	36	30	.545	14.0	66
9	Houston Rockets	34	32	.515	16.0	66
10	Phoenix Suns	33	33	.500	17.0	66
11	Portland Trail Blazers	28	38	.424	22.0	66
12	Minnesota Timberwolves	26	40	.394	24.0	66
13	Golden State Warriors	23	43	.348	27.0	66
14	Sacramento Kings	22	44	.333	28.0	66
15	New Orleans Hornets	21	45	.318	29.0	66

=== Game log ===
2011–12 game log
Total: 21–45 (Home: 11–22; Road: 10–23)
December: 2–1 (home: 1–1; road: 1–0)

Game	Date	Team	Score	High points	High rebounds	High assists	Location Attendance	Record
1	December 26	@ Phoenix	W 85–84	Eric Gordon (20)	Emeka Okafor (9)	Eric Gordon (3)	US Airways Center; 17,776	1–0
2	December 28	Boston	W 97–78	Jarrett Jack (21)	Carl Landry (11)	Jarrett Jack (9)	New Orleans Arena; 17,802	2–0
3	December 30	Phoenix	L 78–93	Carl Landry (17)	Emeka Okafor (16)	Greivis Vásquez (5)	New Orleans Arena; 15,790	2–1

January: 2–16 (home: 1–9; road: 1–7)

Game	Date	Team	Score	High points	High rebounds	High assists	Location Attendance	Record
4	January 1	@ Sacramento	L 80–96	Trevor Ariza (17)	Chris Kaman (15)	Jarrett Jack; Greivis Vásquez (8)	Power Balance Pavilion; 13,628	2–2
5	January 2	@ Utah	L 90–94	Jarrett Jack (27)	Jason Smith (8)	Jarrett Jack (11)	EnergySolutions Arena; 19,159	2–3
6	January 4	Philadelphia	L 93–101	Eric Gordon (22)	Chris Kaman; Carl Landry (8)	Jarrett Jack (11)	New Orleans Arena; 12,387	2–4
7	January 6	Denver	L 88–96	Greivis Vásquez (16)	Chris Kaman (12)	Jarrett Jack (6)	New Orleans Arena; 13,035	2–5
8	January 7	@ Dallas	L 81–96	Al-Farouq Aminu (15)	Al-Farouq Aminu (12)	Jarrett Jack (5)	American Airlines Center; 20,409	2–6
9	January 9	@ Denver	W 94–81	Chris Kaman (20)	Chris Kaman; Emeka Okafor (7)	Jarrett Jack (9)	Pepsi Center; 14,002	3–6
10	January 11	Oklahoma City	L 85–95	Chris Kaman; Carl Landry (17)	Chris Kaman; Al-Farouq Aminu (9)	Jarrett Jack (8)	New Orleans Arena; 13,565	3–7
11	January 13	Minnesota	L 80–87	Marco Belinelli (20)	Emeka Okafor (14)	Jarrett Jack (9)	New Orleans Arena; 14,295	3–8
12	January 14	@ Memphis	L 99–108	Jarrett Jack (23)	Jason Smith (8)	Greivis Vásquez (6)	FedExForum; 14,983	3–9
13	January 16	Portland	L 77–84	LaMarcus Aldridge (22)	Emeka Okafor (10)	Raymond Felton (12)	New Orleans Arena	3–10
14	January 18	Memphis	L 87–93	Jarrett Jack (27)	Marc Gasol (12)	Mike Conley Jr. (10)	New Orleans Arena	3–11
15	January 19	@ Houston	L 88–90 (OT)	Kevin Martin (32)	Samuel Dalembert (17)	Kyle Lowry (8)	Toyota Center	3–12
16	January 21	Dallas	L 81–83	Carl Landry (19)	Emeka Okafor (17)	Delonte West (6)	New Orleans Arena	3–13
17	January 23	San Antonio	L 102–104	Tim Duncan (28)	Emeka Okafor (8)	Tony Parker (17)	New Orleans Arena	3–14
18	January 25	@ Oklahoma City	L 91–101	Kevin Durant (25)	Emeka Okafor (8)	James Harden (6)	Chesapeake Energy Arena	3–15
19	January 27	Orlando	W 93–67	Dwight Howard (28)	Dwight Howard (16)	Jarrett Jack (9)	New Orleans Arena	4–15
20	January 29	Atlanta	L 72–94	Jeff Teague (24)	Joe Johnson (9)	Greivis Vásquez (8)	New Orleans Arena	4–16
21	January 30	@ Miami	L 95–109	LeBron James (22)	LeBron James (11)	LeBron James (8)	American Airlines Arena	4–17

February : 4–10 (home: 1–5; road: 3–5)

Game	Date	Team	Score	High points	High rebounds	High assists	Location Attendance	Record
22	February 1	Phoenix	L 103–120	Steve Nash (30)	Marcin Gortat (11)	Greivis Vásquez (12)	New Orleans Arena	4–18
23	February 2	@ San Antonio	L 81–93	Tim Duncan (19)	Tim Duncan (9)	Tony Parker (7)	AT&T Center	4–19
24	February 4	@ Detroit	L 87–89	Trevor Ariza (26)	Greg Monroe (16	Greivis Vásquez (9)	The Palace of Auburn Hills	4–20
25	February 6	Sacramento	L 92–100	DeMarcus Cousins (28)	DeMarcus Cousins (19)	Greivis Vásquez (9)	New Orleans Arena	4–21
26	February 8	Chicago	L 67–90	Carlos Boozer (18)	Joakim Noah (10)	Derrick Rose (6)	New Orleans Arena	4–22
27	February 10	Portland	L 86–94	Jamal Crawford (31)	Trevor Ariza (9)	Jamal Crawford (8)	New Orleans Arena	4–23
28	February 13	Utah	W 86–80	Chris Kaman (27)	Chris Kaman (13)	Greivis Vásquez (10)	New Orleans Arena	5–23
29	February 15	@ Milwaukee	W 92–89	Ersan İlyasova (23)	Gustavo Ayon (12)	Greivis Vásquez (7)	Bradley Center	6–23
30	February 17	@ New York	W 89–85	Amar'e Stoudemire (26)	Amar'e Stoudemire (12)	Greivis Vásquez (11)	Madison Square Garden	7–23
31	February 20	@ Oklahoma City	L 93–101	Kevin Durant (31)	Kendrick Perkins (13)	Trevor Ariza (5)	Chesapeake Energy Arena	7–24
32	February 21	@ Indiana	L 108–117 (OT)	Roy Hibbert (30)	Roy Hibbert (13)	Jarrett Jack (10)	Bankers Life Fieldhouse	7–25
33	February 22	@ Cleveland	W 89–84	Antawn Jamison (22)	Gustavo Ayon (17)	Kyrie Irving (11)	Quicken Loans Arena	8–25
34	February 28	@ Chicago	L 95–99	Derrick Rose (32)	Joakim Noah (16)	Derrick Rose (9)	United Center	8–26
35	February 29	Toronto	L 84–95	Linas Kleiza (21)	Chris Kaman (10)	Jarrett Jack (6)	New Orleans Arena	8–27

March: 5–12 (home: 2–6; road: 3–6)

Game	Date	Team	Score	High points	High rebounds	High assists	Location Attendance	Record
36	March 2	Dallas	W 97–92	Rodrigue Beaubois (25)	Chris Kaman (13)	Greivis Vásquez (7)	New Orleans Arena	9–27
37	March 3	Indiana	L 84–102	Jarrett Jack (18)	Solomon Jones (9)	Gustavo Ayon (4)	New Orleans Arena; 16,379	9–28
38	March 5	@ Portland	L 74–86	Marco Belinelli (18)	Chris Kaman (11)	Three players (3)	Rose Garden; 20,520	9–29
39	March 7	@ Sacramento	L 98–99	Jarrett Jack (25)	Chris Kaman (11)	Chris Kaman (8)	Power Balance Pavilion; 13,487	9–30
40	March 9	@ Denver	L 97–110	Lance Thomas (18)	Four players (5)	Greivis Vásquez (8)	Pepsi Center; 19,155	9–31
41	March 10	@ Minnesota	W 95–89	Chris Kaman (20)	Al-Farouq Aminu; Chris Kaman (6)	Jarrett Jack (7)	Target Center; 20,123	10–31
42	March 12	Charlotte	L 71–73	Jarrett Jack (15)	Chris Kaman (16)	Jarrett Jack (9)	New Orleans Arena; 15,254	10–32
43	March 14	L. A. Lakers	L 101–107 (OT)	Jarrett Jack (30)	Chris Kaman (12)	Jarrett Jack; Greivis Vásquez (6)	New Orleans Arena; 17,272	10–33
44	March 15	Washington	L 89–99	Chris Kaman (20)	Gustavo Ayon (9)	Greivis Vásquez (6)	New Orleans Arena; 14,256	10–34
45	March 17	@ New Jersey	W 102–94	Marco Belinelli; Chris Kaman (20)	Gustavo Ayon (9)	Greivis Vásquez (9)	Prudential Center; 11,271	11–34
46	March 21	Golden State	L 92–101	Jarrett Jack (17)	Jarrett Jack (10)	Jarrett Jack (11)	New Orleans Arena; 13,959	11–35
47	March 22	L. A. Clippers	W 97–90	Chris Kaman (20)	Chris Kaman (10)	Jarrett Jack (9)	New Orleans Arena; 17,209	12–35
48	March 24	San Antonio	L 86–89	Jarrett Jack (27)	Gustavo Ayon (13)	Greivis Vásquez (6)	New Orleans Arena; 16,118	12–36
49	March 26	@ L. A. Clippers	L 85–97	Al-Farouq Aminu (15)	Carl Landry (10)	Jarrett Jack; Greivis Vásquez (7)	Staples Center; 19,060	12–37
50	March 28	@ Golden State	W 102–87	Marco Belinelli (22)	Al-Farouq Aminu; Carl Landry (8)	Jarrett Jack (9)	Oracle Arena; 18,771	13–37
51	March 29	@ Portland	L 93–99	Marco Belinelli (27)	Jason Smith (9)	Greivis Vásquez (6)	Rose Garden; 20,499	13–38
52	March 31	@ L. A. Lakers	L 85–88	Jarrett Jack (18)	Jason Smith (10)	Jarrett Jack (10)	Staples Center; 18,997	13–39

April : 8–6 (home: 6–2; road: 2–4)

Game	Date	Team	Score	High points	High rebounds	High assists	Location Attendance	Record
53	April 1	@ Phoenix	L 75–92	Marco Belinelli; Jason Smith (14)	Al-Farouq Aminu (8)	Greivis Vásquez (6)	US Airways Center; 15,753	13–40
54	April 4	Denver	W 94–92	Trevor Ariza; Eric Gordon (15)	Chris Kaman (10)	Greivis Vásquez (10)	New Orleans Arena; 15,020	14–40
55	April 6	@ San Antonio	L 103–128	Eric Gordon (31)	Three players (6)	Eric Gordon (4)	AT&T Center; 18,581	14–41
56	April 7	Minnesota	W 99–90	Jason Smith (26)	Chris Kaman; Jason Smith (10)	Greivis Vásquez (10)	New Orleans Arena; 15,520	15–41
57	April 9	L. A. Lakers	L 91–93	Marco Belinelli (20)	Carl Landry (11)	Greivis Vásquez (11)	New Orleans Arena; 17,275	15–42
58	April 11	Sacramento	W 105–96	Jason Smith (22)	Chris Kaman (10)	Jerome Dyson; Greivis Vásquez (5)	New Orleans Arena; 16,906	16–42
59	April 13	Utah	W 96–85	Eric Gordon (25)	Jason Smith (8)	Eric Gordon; Greivis Vásquez (6)	New Orleans Arena; 16,326	17–42
60	April 15	Memphis	W 88–75	Eric Gordon (18)	Carl Landry (11)	Greivis Vásquez (9)	New Orleans Arena; 15,570	18–42
61	April 16	@ Charlotte	W 75–67	Greivis Vásquez (20)	Carl Landry (12)	Greivis Vásquez (6)	Time Warner Cable Arena; 10,876	19–42
62	April 18	@ Memphis	L 91–103	Jerome Dyson (24)	Darryl Watkins (13)	Greivis Vásquez (9)	FedExForum; 14,507	19–43
63	April 19	Houston	W 105–99 (OT)	Eric Gordon (27)	Carl Landry; Gustavo Ayon (10)	Greivis Vásquez (9)	New Orleans Arena; 18,315	20–43
64	April 22	@ L. A. Clippers	L 98–107	Eric Gordon (17)	Jason Smith; Al-Farouq Aminu (8)	Greivis Vásquez (7)	Staples Center; 19,060	20–44
65	April 24	@ Golden State	W 83–81	Marco Belinelli (23)	Al-Farouq Aminu (11)	Greivis Vásquez (7)	Oracle Arena; 17,598	21–44
66	April 26	@ Houston	L 77–84	Jerome Dyson (15)	Al-Farouq Aminu; Darryl Watkins (10)	Greivis Vásquez (6)	Toyota Center; 16,602	21–45

2011–12 season schedule

== Player statistics ==
Legend
GP	Games played	GS	Games started	MPG	Minutes per game
FG%	Field-goal percentage	3P%	3-point field-goal percentage	FT%	Free-throw percentage
RPG	Rebounds per game	APG	Assists per game	SPG	Steals per game
BPG	Blocks per game	PPG	Points per game

=== Regular season ===
Player	GP	GS	MPG	FG%	3P%	FT%	RPG	APG	SPG	BPG	PPG
Marco Belinelli	66	55	29.8	.417	.377	.783	2.6	1.5	.7	.1	11.8
Greivis Vásquez	66	26	25.8	.430	.319	.821	2.6	5.4	.9	.1	8.9
Al-Farouq Aminu	66	21	22.4	.411	.277	.754	4.7	1.0	.9	.5	6.0
Gustavo Ayón	54	24	20.1	.536	.000	.619	4.9	1.4	1.0	.9	5.9
Chris Kaman	47	33	29.2	.446		.785	7.7	2.1	.5	1.6	13.1
Jarrett Jack	45	39	34.0	.456	.348	.872	3.9	6.3	.7	.2	15.6
Xavier Henry	45	0	16.9	.395	.412	.612	2.4	.8	.6	.2	5.3
Lance Thomas	42	10	15.0	.452	.000	.839	3.0	.3	.2	.2	4.0
Trevor Ariza	41	41	32.9	.417	.333	.775	5.2	3.3	1.7	.6	10.8
Carl Landry	41	8	24.4	.503	.000	.799	5.2	.9	.3	.3	12.5
Jason Smith	40	29	23.7	.520	.111	.702	4.9	.9	.5	1.0	9.9
Emeka Okafor	27	27	28.9	.533		.514	7.9	.9	.6	1.0	9.9
DaJuan Summers	15	6	13.9	.431	.313	.778	1.5	.7	.5	.0	4.5
Carldell Johnson	15	0	7.9	.314	.267	.333	.6	1.5	.5	.0	1.8
Solomon Jones^{†}	11	1	17.8	.434		.833	3.7	.6	.5	.5	5.5
Trey Johnson	11	0	5.5	.571		1.000	1.1	.4	.1	.0	1.9
Eric Gordon	9	9	34.4	.450	.250	.754	2.8	3.4	1.4	.4	20.6
Jerome Dyson	9	1	20.0	.396	.125	.778	2.1	2.0	1.2	.2	7.4
Chris Johnson^{†}	7	0	11.7	.500		.714	3.1	.1	.7	.1	3.3
Darryl Watkins	5	0	19.6	.500		.500	5.4	.6	1.0	.8	4.6
Jeff Foote	4	0	9.8	.333			1.5	.0	.0	.3	1.0
Donald Sloan^{†}	3	0	13.7	.357	.000	.500	1.0	2.7	.7	.0	4.0

- ^{†} Denotes player spent time with another team in the season. Stats reflect time with the Hornets only.
