= Bobby Simmons =

American former professional basketball player (born 1980)

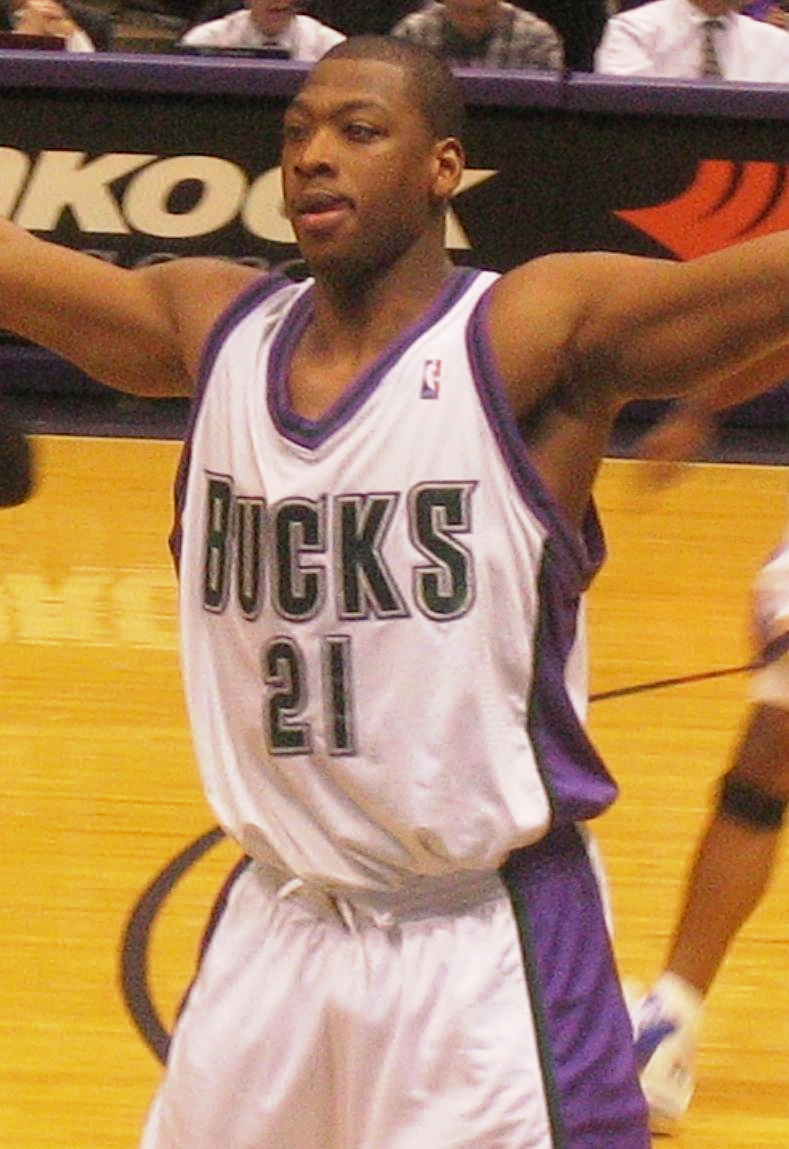
- Simmons with the Milwaukee Bucks in 2005

Personal information
- Born: June 2, 1980 (age 46) Chicago, Illinois, U.S.
- Listed height: 6 ft 6 in (1.98 m)
- Listed weight: 235 lb (107 kg)

Career information
- High school: Simeon (Chicago, Illinois)
- College: DePaul (1998–2001)
- NBA draft: 2001: 2nd round, 41st overall pick
- Drafted by: Seattle SuperSonics
- Playing career: 2001–2012
- Position: Small forward
- Number: 21, 1

Career history
- 2001–2002: Washington Wizards
- 2002: Mobile Revelers
- 2002–2003: Washington Wizards
- 2003–2005: Los Angeles Clippers
- 2005–2008: Milwaukee Bucks
- 2008–2010: New Jersey Nets
- 2010: San Antonio Spurs
- 2011–2012: Reno Bighorns
- 2012: Los Angeles Clippers

Career highlights
- NBA Most Improved Player (2005)
- Stats at NBA.com
- Stats at Basketball Reference
Medals
Men's basketball
Representing United States
FIBA Americas U18 Championship
| Gold medal – first place | 1998 Puerto Plata | Team competition |
FIBA U19 World Championship
| Silver medal – second place | 1999 Lisbon | Team competition |

Bobby Simmons (born June 2, 1980) is an American former professional basketball player. During his NBA career, Simmons played for five NBA teams between 2001 and 2012. He won the NBA Most Improved Player Award in 2005.

== College career ==
After graduating from Chicago's Neal F. Simeon High School, Simmons played three years of college basketball for DePaul University. During his three seasons at DePaul, Simmons averaged 13.6 points per game, 7.5 rebounds per game and 2.2 assists per game.

== Professional career ==
=== Washington Wizards (2001–2003) ===
Simmons was selected in the second round (41st pick overall) of the 2001 NBA draft by the Seattle SuperSonics. Simmons's draft rights were traded to the Washington Wizards for Predrag Drobnjak on June 27, 2001.

Simmons was traded by the Wizards on September 11, 2002, shortly before the start of the 2002–03 NBA season, to the Detroit Pistons with Hubert Davis and Richard Hamilton for Jerry Stackhouse, Brian Cardinal, and Ratko Varda. He was released by the Pistons on September 24 and, less than two weeks later, signed with the Wizards again on October 10.

=== Los Angeles Clippers (2003–2005) ===
Simmons signed a free-agent contract with the Los Angeles Clippers on September 26, 2003.

The 6 ft 8 in (203 cm), 235 lb (107 kg) small forward had a breakout year during the 2004–05 NBA season with the Los Angeles Clippers in which he averaged a career-high 16.4 points per game. That season, on November 3, Simmons scored a team-leading and career-high 30 points during a win over the Seattle SuperSonics. He was rewarded for his stellar play with that season's NBA Most Improved Player Award.

=== Milwaukee Bucks (2005–2008) ===
Simmons signed a five-year, $47 million contract with the Milwaukee Bucks on August 8, 2005, shortly after the new collective bargaining agreement was finalized. Since his breakout year with the Clippers, Simmons struggled to reach the same level of play. In his first year with the Bucks, his points, rebounds and shooting percentages all declined. Then in 2006, an ankle injury suffered in training camp during October forced him to miss the entire 2006–07 season. In December of the same year and then January 2007, a surgery to remove bone spurs and surgery to remove a cyst in his foot both complicated his recovery.

=== New Jersey Nets (2008–2010) ===
Simmons was traded along with Yi Jianlian to the New Jersey Nets for Richard Jefferson on June 26, 2008, just a few hours before that year's NBA draft. While his season was not as productive as before, he still managed to finish 5th in the league in 3-point shooting percentage.

=== San Antonio Spurs (2010) ===
In September 2010, Simmons signed with the San Antonio Spurs; however, the team waived him in November after he went scoreless in 2 games played.

=== Reno Bighorns (2011–2012) ===
In March 2011, Simmons signed with the Reno Bighorns of the NBA D-League.

=== Return to the Clippers (2012) ===
On February 27, 2012, the Los Angeles Clippers signed Simmons to a 10-day contract. On March 9, 2012, he signed a second 10-day contract with the Clippers. He signed a contract for the rest of the season on March 24, 2012. Simmons' final NBA game was Game 4 of the 2012 Western Conference Semi-Finals against the San Antonino Spurs on May 20, 2012. In his final game, Simmons recorded 2 points on 25% FG shooting in 6 and half minutes of playing time. This was the end of the Clippers' season as they lost Game 4 99 - 102 and thus were swept by the Spurs.

In December 2012, Simmons said that he was still interested in playing professional basketball.

== Off the court ==
Simmons and Lavelle Sykes founded a Chicago clothing store called Succezz. Simmons also owns a nightclub in Chicago called Society.

== NBA career statistics ==
Legend
| GP | Games played | GS | Games started | MPG | Minutes per game |
| FG% | Field goal percentage | 3P% | 3-point field goal percentage | FT% | Free throw percentage |
| RPG | Rebounds per game | APG | Assists per game | SPG | Steals per game |
| BPG | Blocks per game | PPG | Points per game | **Bold** | Career high |

=== Regular season ===
| Year | Team | GP | GS | MPG | FG% | 3P% | FT% | RPG | APG | SPG | BPG | PPG |
|---|---|---|---|---|---|---|---|---|---|---|---|---|
| 2001–02 | Washington | 30 | 3 | 11.4 | .453 | .286 | .733 | 1.7 | .6 | .4 | .2 | 3.7 |
| 2002–03 | Washington | 36 | 2 | 10.5 | .393 | .000 | **.914** | 2.1 | .6 | .3 | .1 | 3.3 |
| 2003–04 | L.A. Clippers | 56 | 8 | 24.6 | .394 | .167 | .834 | 4.7 | 1.7 | .9 | **.3** | 7.8 |
| 2004–05 | L.A. Clippers | **75** | **74** | **37.3** | **.466** | .435 | .846 | **5.9** | **2.7** | **1.4** | .2 | **16.4** |
| 2005–06 | Milwaukee | **75** | **74** | 33.8 | .453 | .420 | .825 | 4.4 | 2.3 | 1.1 | **.3** | 13.4 |
| 2007–08 | Milwaukee | 70 | 21 | 21.7 | .421 | .351 | .757 | 3.2 | 1.1 | .7 | .1 | 7.6 |
| 2008–09 | New Jersey | 71 | 44 | 24.4 | .449 | **.447** | .741 | 3.9 | 1.3 | .7 | .1 | 7.8 |
| 2009–10 | New Jersey | 23 | 2 | 17.2 | .359 | .317 | .900 | 2.7 | .7 | .7 | .1 | 5.3 |
| 2010–11 | San Antonio | 2 | 0 | 8.0 | .000 | .000 | .000 | .0 | 1.0 | .0 | .0 | .0 |
| 2011–12 | L.A. Clippers | 28 | 0 | 14.9 | .311 | .333 | .571 | 2.0 | .4 | .5 | .1 | 2.9 |
| Career | | 466 | 228 | 24.7 | .437 | .396 | .823 | 3.8 | 1.5 | .8 | .2 | 9.0 |

=== Playoffs ===
| Year | Team | GP | GS | MPG | FG% | 3P% | FT% | RPG | APG | SPG | BPG | PPG |
|---|---|---|---|---|---|---|---|---|---|---|---|---|
| 2006 | Milwaukee | **5** | **5** | **31.8** | .333 | **.417** | .000 | **3.6** | **2.0** | **1.8** | **.2** | **6.6** |
| 2012 | L.A. Clippers | 4 | 1 | 8.0 | **.556** | .250 | .000 | .3 | .0 | .0 | .0 | 2.8 |
| Career | | 9 | 6 | 21.1 | .373 | .375 | .000 | 2.1 | 1.1 | 1.0 | .1 | 4.9 |
