= Marreese Speights =

American basketball player (born 1987)

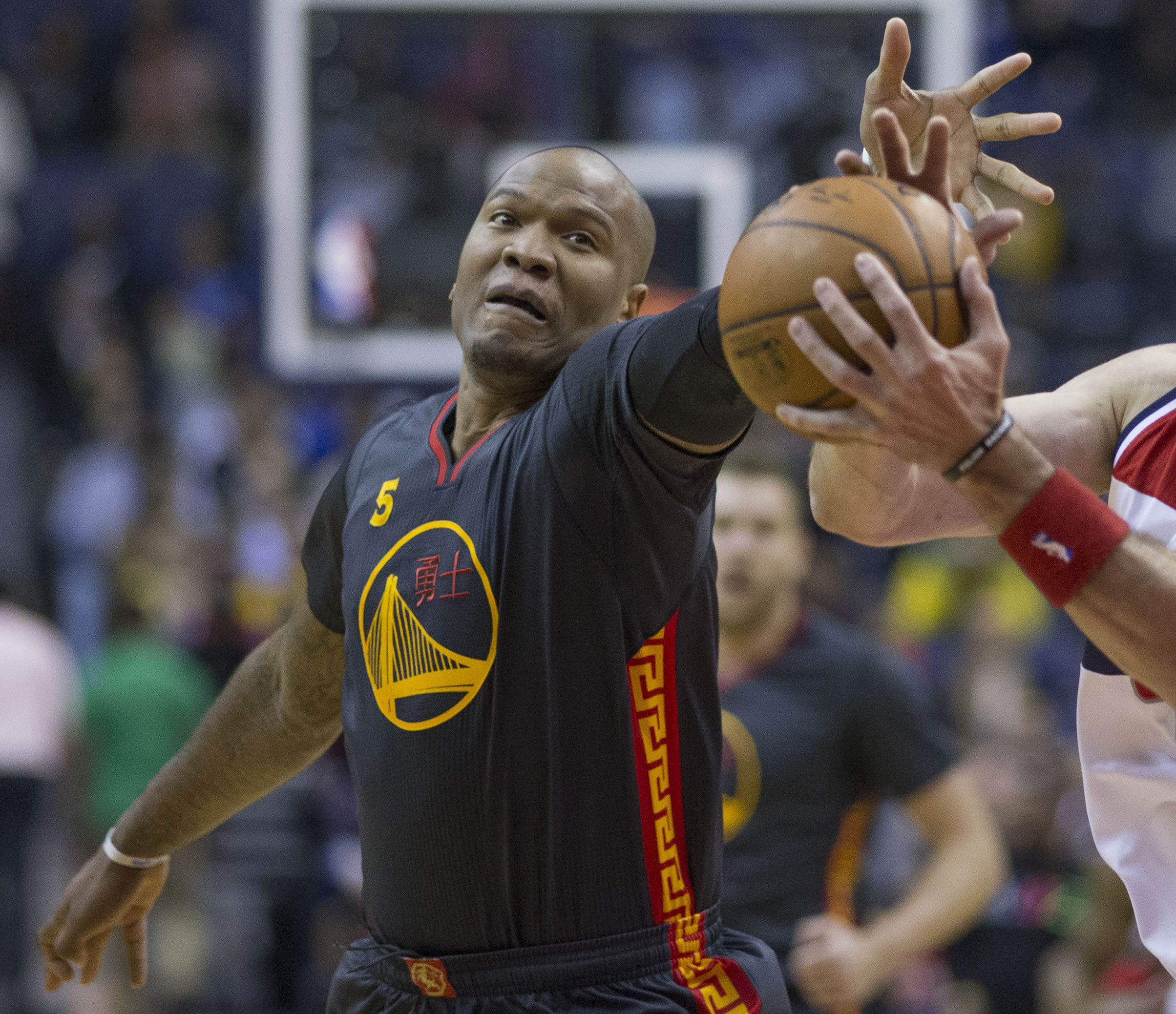
- Speights with the Golden State Warriors in 2015

Polk State Eagles
- Title: Head Coach
- League: Citrus Conference

Personal information
- Born: August 4, 1987 (age 39) St. Petersburg, Florida, U.S.
- Listed height: 6 ft 10 in (2.08 m)
- Listed weight: 255 lb (116 kg)

Career information
- High school: Gibbs (St. Petersburg, Florida); Admiral Farragut Academy (St. Petersburg, Florida); Hargrave Military (Chatham, Virginia)
- College: Florida (2006–2008)
- NBA draft: 2008: 1st round, 16th overall pick
- Drafted by: Philadelphia 76ers
- Playing career: 2008–2021
- Position: Center / power forward
- Number: 16, 5, 15
- Coaching career: 2023–present

Career history

Playing
- 2008–2012: Philadelphia 76ers
- 2012–2013: Memphis Grizzlies
- 2013: Cleveland Cavaliers
- 2013–2016: Golden State Warriors
- 2016–2017: Los Angeles Clippers
- 2017–2018: Orlando Magic
- 2018–2021: Guangzhou Long-Lions

Coaching
- 2023–2026: Georgia Southern (assistant)
- 2026–present: Polk State

Career highlights
- NBA champion (2015); NCAA champion (2007)
- Stats at NBA.com
- Stats at Basketball Reference

Marreese Akeem "Mo" Speights (born August 4, 1987) is an American former professional basketball player in the National Basketball Association (NBA). He played college basketball for the Florida Gators, where he was a freshman member of their NCAA national championship team in 2007. The Philadelphia 76ers selected Speights in the first round of the 2008 NBA draft with the 16th overall pick. With the Golden State Warriors, he won an NBA championship in 2015.

== Early life ==
Speights was born in St. Petersburg, Florida. He played basketball at St. Petersburg's Admiral Farragut Academy, which retired his jersey number after one year. He also played basketball at Hargrave Military Academy (senior year) and Gibbs High School.

Considered a four-star recruit by Rivals.com, Speights was listed as the No. 13 power forward and the No. 51 player in the nation in 2006.

== College career ==
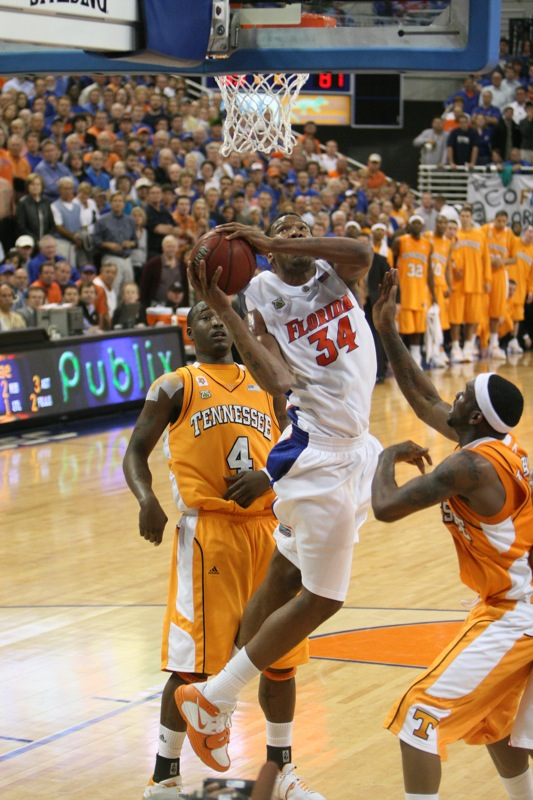
Speights (#34) in 2008

Speights began his career at the University of Florida in 2006–07, and averaged approximately four points and two rebounds in six minutes per game as a freshman for the national champion Gators. He saw few minutes behind big men Al Horford, Joakim Noah, and Chris Richard.

Speights ended the 2007–08 season averaging 14.5 points, 8.1 rebounds, and 1.4 blocks per game. After his sophomore season, he declared himself eligible for the 2008 NBA draft. Speights confirmed with Florida coach Billy Donovan on June 12, 2008, that he would not be returning to the Gators.

== Professional career ==
=== Philadelphia 76ers (2008–2012) ===
Speights was drafted by the Philadelphia 76ers with the 16th pick of the first round in the 2008 NBA draft. He signed with Philadelphia on July 18, 2008. As a rookie, Speights had a field-goal percentage of .502 from the field, playing 79 games, shooting .773 from the free throw line, and notching two starts.

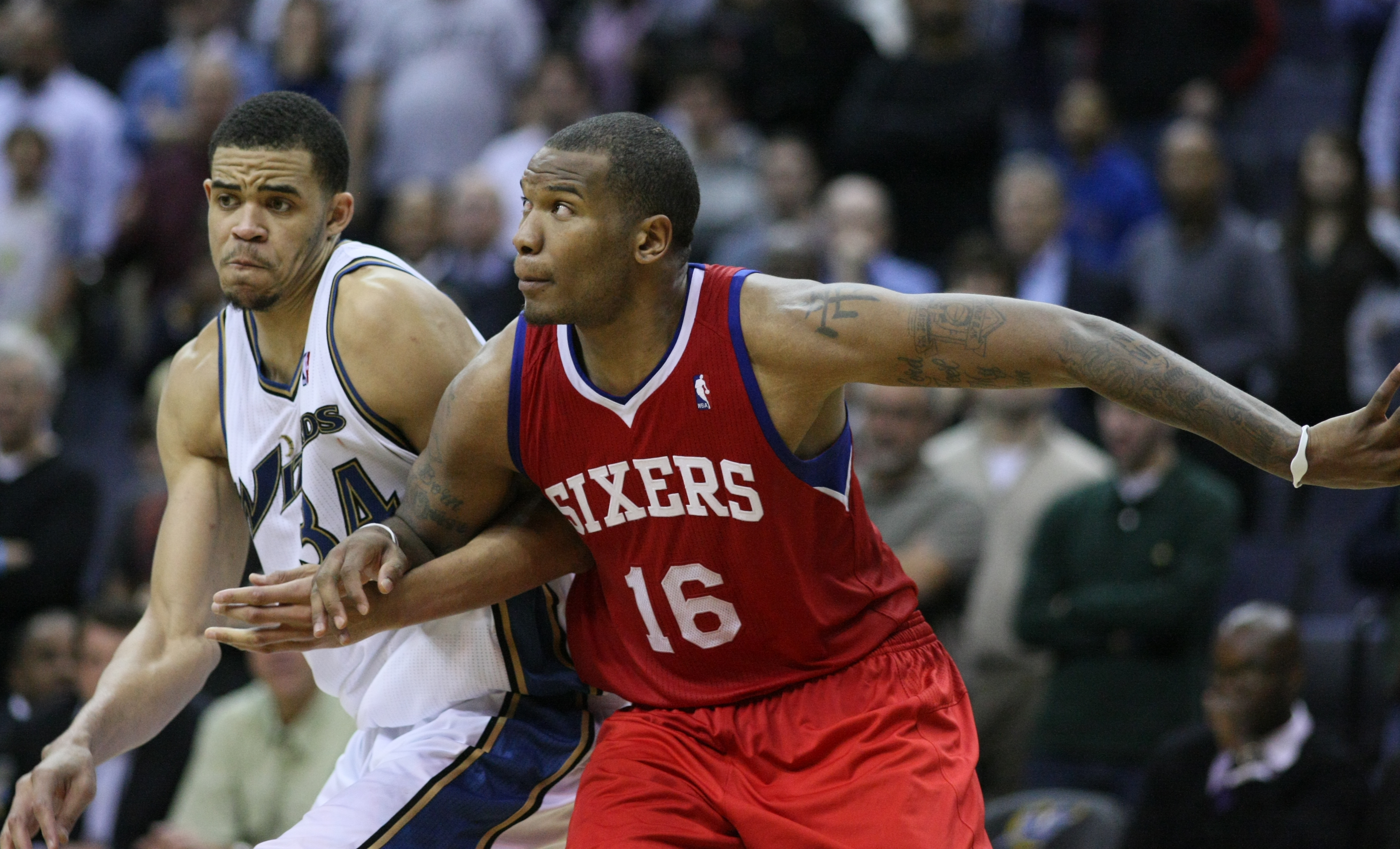
Speights (right) battling JaVale McGee in 2010

Speights' second season with the 76ers started off on a high note, as he saw a slight increase in playing time and put up good numbers. Speights scored 15 or more points in five of his first 10 games and was a vital part of the team's frontcourt. During the fourth quarter of the November 14 game against the Chicago Bulls, Speights injured his left knee. An MRI revealed a partial tear of his medial collateral ligament (MCL). Speights missed 14 games and came back December 16, to play 22 minutes in a losing effort against the Cleveland Cavaliers. After returning from the injury, his playing time became limited, mostly because of the increased production from Elton Brand. Speights made 62 total appearances for the team, posting averages of 8.6 points and 4.1 rebounds.

The 76ers hired Doug Collins as their new head coach for the 2010–11 season. Known for his defensive-minded coaching philosophy, this shift in team focus adversely affected Speights, who was known more for his offensive capabilities. Frequent clashes with the coaching staff led to a career-low 11.5 minutes per contest. However, Speights got one start against the New Orleans Hornets on January 3, 2011, and notched 12 points and six rebounds. For the season, Speights averaged 5.4 points and 3.3 rebounds, both career–lows.

=== Memphis Grizzlies (2012–2013) ===
On January 4, 2012, Speights was acquired by the Memphis Grizzlies as a part of a three-team trade that sent Xavier Henry to the New Orleans Hornets and two future second round picks to the Philadelphia 76ers. He made 60 appearances (including 54 starts) for the Grizzlies over the remainder of the year, averaging 8.8 points and 6.2 rebounds.

On June 29, 2012, the Grizzlies extended a qualifying offer to Speights, making him a restricted free agent. However, on July 13, Speights re-signed with the Grizzlies to a two-year, $8 million contract. Speights logged 40 appearances (including two starts) for Memphis during the 2012–13 NBA season, averaging 6.6 points and 4.7 rebounds.

=== Cleveland Cavaliers (2013) ===
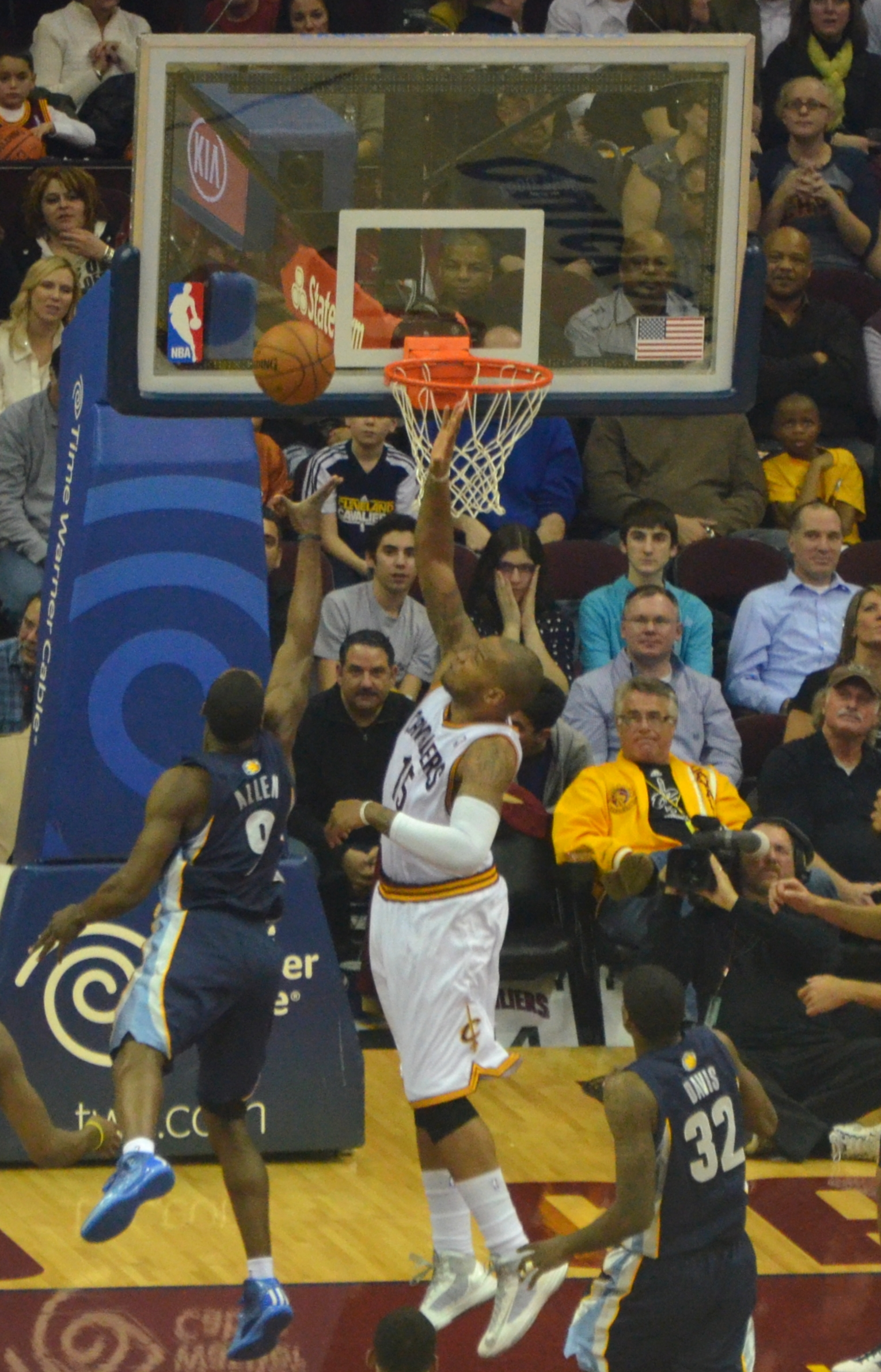
Speights attempting to block a shot from Tony Allen in 2013

On January 22, 2013, Speights was traded to the Cleveland Cavaliers, along with Wayne Ellington, Josh Selby, and a future first round draft pick, in exchange for Jon Leuer. In his half a season with the Cavaliers, Speights averaged 10.2 points and 5.1 rebounds in 39 games.

=== Golden State Warriors (2013–2016) ===
On July 12, 2013, Speights signed with the Golden State Warriors. On February 10, 2014, Speights scored a career-high 32 points in a 123–80 victory over the Philadelphia 76ers. He made 79 appearances (including three starts) for Golden State in the 2013–14 NBA season, recording averages of 6.4 points and 3.7 rebounds.

Speights played in 76 games (starting nine) for the Warriors in the 2014–15 season, averaging a career–high 10.4 points and 4.3 points. He won his first NBA championship when the Warriors defeated the Cleveland Cavaliers in the 2015 NBA Finals in six games. After being the team's top scoring option off the bench in 2014–15, Speights gained the nickname "Mo Buckets".

On June 29, 2015, the Warriors exercised his team option for the 2015–16 season. During the 2015–16 season, Speights helped the Warriors record a 24–0 start to the season (an NBA record) and helped them finish 73–9, the best overall record in NBA history, surpassing the 1995–96 Chicago Bulls' mark of 72–10. In Game 3 of the Warriors' first-round playoff series against the Houston Rockets, Speights, who didn't attempt a three-pointer in the first 29 playoff games of his career, was 3-of-6 on three-pointers and finished with 22 points in a 97–96 loss. The Warriors went on to defeat the Rockets in five games. In the second round, Speights helped the Warriors defeat the Portland Trail Blazers in five games to qualify for the Western Conference Finals. In their conference finals match-up with the Oklahoma City Thunder, the Warriors fought back from a 3–1 deficit in the series to clinch a 4–3 victory. In Game 5 of the series, Speights scored 14 points in nine minutes to help the Warriors save their season. With a Game 7 victory, the Warriors moved on to the NBA Finals for the second straight year, where they would again face the Cleveland Cavaliers. Despite the Warriors going up 3–1 in the series following a Game 4 victory, they went on to lose the series in seven games to become the first team in NBA history to lose the championship series after being up 3–1.

=== Los Angeles Clippers (2016–2017) ===
On July 12, 2016, Speights signed with the Los Angeles Clippers. On January 16, 2017, he scored a season-high 23 points in a 120–98 victory over the Oklahoma City Thunder. Speights appeared in all 82 games (starting two) for Los Angeles during the 2016–17 season, posting averages of 8.7 points and 4.5 rebounds. On May 23, Speights opted out of his contract for the 2017–18 season with the Clippers, making him an unrestricted free agent.

=== Orlando Magic (2017–2018) ===
On July 27, 2017, Speights signed with the Orlando Magic. On October 30, he scored 18 points and hit a career-high six three-pointers, including five in a six-minute span, during a 115–99 victory over the New Orleans Pelicans. Speights made 52 appearances (three starts) for Orlando during the 2017–18 season, averaging 7.7 points and 2.6 rebounds.

=== Guangzhou Loong Lions (2018–2021) ===
On July 2, 2018, the Guangzhou Loong Lions of the CBA announced the signing of Marreese Speights. On January 16, 2019, his import player roster spot was replaced by Cory Jefferson.

On August 17, 2020, it was reported that Guangzhou had re-signed Speights.

== Coaching career ==
On May 13, 2026, Speights was announced as the head basketball coach at Polk State College.

== NBA career statistics ==
Legend
| GP | Games played | GS | Games started | MPG | Minutes per game |
| FG% | Field goal percentage | 3P% | 3-point field goal percentage | FT% | Free throw percentage |
| RPG | Rebounds per game | APG | Assists per game | SPG | Steals per game |
| BPG | Blocks per game | PPG | Points per game | **Bold** | Career high |
| † | Won an NBA championship | * | Led the league |

=== Regular season ===
| Year | Team | GP | GS | MPG | FG% | 3P% | FT% | RPG | APG | SPG | BPG | PPG |
|---|---|---|---|---|---|---|---|---|---|---|---|---|
| 2008–09 | Philadelphia | 79 | 2 | 16.0 | **.502** | .250 | .773 | 3.7 | .4 | .3 | **.7** | 7.7 |
| 2009–10 | Philadelphia | 62 | 1 | 16.4 | .477 | .000 | .745 | 4.1 | .6 | **.5** | .5 | 8.6 |
| 2010–11 | Philadelphia | 64 | 1 | 11.5 | .495 | .250 | .753 | 3.3 | .5 | .1 | .3 | 5.4 |
| 2011–12 | Memphis | 60 | **54** | **22.4** | .453 | .000 | .771 | **6.2** | .8 | .4 | .5 | 8.8 |
| 2012–13 | Memphis | 40 | 2 | 14.5 | .429 | **.400** | .716 | 4.7 | .5 | .3 | **.7** | 6.6 |
| 2012–13 | Cleveland | 39 | 1 | 18.5 | .457 | .200 | .806 | 5.1 | .7 | .4 | **.7** | 10.2 |
| 2013–14 | Golden State | 79 | 3 | 12.4 | .441 | .258 | .821 | 3.7 | .4 | .1 | .4 | 6.4 |
| 2014–15† | Golden State | 76 | 9 | 15.9 | .492 | .278 | .843 | 4.3 | **.9** | .3 | .4 | **10.4** |
| 2015–16 | Golden State | 72 | 0 | 11.6 | .432 | .387 | .825 | 3.3 | .8 | .3 | .5 | 7.1 |
| 2016–17 | L.A. Clippers | **82*** | 2 | 15.7 | .445 | .372 | **.876** | 4.5 | .8 | .3 | .5 | 8.7 |
| 2017–18 | Orlando | 52 | 3 | 13.0 | .395 | .369 | .727 | 2.6 | .8 | .2 | .4 | 7.7 |
| Career | | 705 | 78 | 15.1 | .459 | .356 | .797 | 4.1 | .7 | .3 | .5 | 7.9 |

=== Playoffs ===
| Year | Team | GP | GS | MPG | FG% | 3P% | FT% | RPG | APG | SPG | BPG | PPG |
|---|---|---|---|---|---|---|---|---|---|---|---|---|
| 2009 | Philadelphia | 3 | 0 | 9.7 | .429 | .000 | .750 | 2.0 | .0 | .0 | .0 | 3.0 |
| 2011 | Philadelphia | 2 | 0 | 10.5 | .167 | .000 | .000 | 3.0 | **.5** | .0 | .5 | 2.0 |
| 2012 | Memphis | 7 | 0 | **14.3** | .488 | .000 | .600 | **4.3** | .3 | **.4** | .4 | **6.6** |
| 2014 | Golden State | 7 | 0 | 9.7 | **.528** | .000 | .500 | 3.1 | .4 | .3 | **.6** | 6.3 |
| 2015† | Golden State | 10 | 0 | 6.7 | .333 | .000 | .600 | 2.1 | .4 | .4 | .3 | 3.7 |
| 2016 | Golden State | **24** | 0 | 8.4 | .390 | **.419** | **.774** | 2.0 | **.5** | .1 | .3 | 5.6 |
| 2017 | L.A. Clippers | 7 | **2** | 14.0 | .432 | .350 | .700 | 2.9 | .4 | .3 | .4 | **6.6** |
| Career | | 60 | 2 | 9.7 | .410 | .397 | .671 | 2.5 | .4 | .2 | .4 | 5.3 |

CBA
| Year | Team | GP | GS | APG | RPG | PPG |
|---|---|---|---|---|---|---|
| 2019 | Guangzhou Long-Lions | 29 | 29 | 1.4 | 7.4 | 22.7 |

== See also ==
- List of Florida Gators in the NBA
