= 2011–12 Los Angeles Clippers season =

NBA professional basketball team season

- Head coach: Vinny Del Negro
- General manager: Neil Olshey
- Owner: Donald Sterling
- Arena: Staples Center

Results
- Record: 40–26 (.606)
- Place: Division: 2nd (Pacific); Conference: 5th (Western)
- Playoff finish: Conference semifinals (lost to Spurs 0–4)
- Stats at Basketball Reference

Local media
- Television: Prime Ticket; Fox Sports West
- Radio: KFWB

The 2011–12 Los Angeles Clippers season was the 42nd season of the franchise in the National Basketball Association (NBA), their 34th season in Southern California, and their 28th season in Los Angeles. Following the 2011 NBA lockout each team only played 66 games instead of the usual 82. The Clippers finished 40–26, their best winning percentage in franchise history at the time, and their first winning season since 2006. They finished the season as the #5 seed in the Western Conference, returning to the playoffs for the first time since 2006.

It marked the first season with 3x All-Star and 2008 All-NBA First Team selection Chris Paul, following the completion of a trade in December with the New Orleans Hornets. Originally thought to be heading to the Lakers, Paul would make the All-NBA Third Team and lead the "Lob City" era of the Clippers for the next six years.

In the playoffs, the Clippers defeated the Memphis Grizzlies in the First Round in seven games, but were swept by the San Antonio Spurs in the Semifinals in four games.

== Key dates ==
- June 23: The 2011 NBA draft took place at Prudential Center in Newark, New Jersey.

== Draft picks ==
Round	Pick	Player	Position	Nationality	College/Team
2	37	Trey Thompkins	PF	United States	Georgia
2	47	Travis Leslie	G	United States	Georgia

The Clippers entered the draft with two second-round selections, both acquired via previous trades. They had traded their original first- and second-round selections to the Cleveland Cavaliers (which turned out to be the first overall pick that was used to draft Kyrie Irving) and the Houston Rockets, respectively.

== Roster ==
2011–12 Los Angeles Clippers roster
Players

Pos.	No.	Player	Height	Weight	DOB	From
SG	1	Chauncey Billups	6 ft 3 in (1.91 m)	210 lb (95 kg)	1976-09-25	Colorado
PG	12	Eric Bledsoe	6 ft 1 in (1.85 m)	195 lb (88 kg)	1989-12-09	Kentucky
SF	5	Caron Butler	6 ft 7 in (2.01 m)	228 lb (103 kg)	1980-03-13	Connecticut
PF	30	Reggie Evans	6 ft 8 in (2.03 m)	245 lb (111 kg)	1980-05-18	Iowa
SG	4	Randy Foye	6 ft 4 in (1.93 m)	213 lb (97 kg)	1983-09-24	Villanova
SF	15	Ryan Gomes	6 ft 7 in (2.01 m)	245 lb (111 kg)	1982-09-01	Providence
PF	32	Blake Griffin	6 ft 10 in (2.08 m)	251 lb (114 kg)	1989-03-16	Oklahoma
C	6	DeAndre Jordan	6 ft 11 in (2.11 m)	265 lb (120 kg)	1988-07-21	Texas A&M
SG	23	Travis Leslie (DL)	6 ft 4 in (1.93 m)	205 lb (93 kg)	1990-03-29	Georgia
PF	2	Kenyon Martin	6 ft 9 in (2.06 m)	234 lb (106 kg)	1977-12-30	Cincinnati
PG	3	Chris Paul	6 ft 0 in (1.83 m)	175 lb (79 kg)	1985-05-06	Wake Forest
SF	21	Bobby Simmons	6 ft 6 in (1.98 m)	235 lb (107 kg)	1980-06-02	DePaul
C	33	Trey Thompkins	6 ft 10 in (2.08 m)	245 lb (111 kg)	1990-05-20	Georgia
SG	25	Mo Williams	6 ft 1 in (1.85 m)	195 lb (88 kg)	1982-12-19	Alabama
SG	11	Nick Young	6 ft 6 in (1.98 m)	210 lb (95 kg)	1985-06-01	USC

Coaches
Head coach
- Vinny Del Negro
Assistant(s)
- Dean Demopoulos
- Howard Eisley
- Marc Iavaroni
- Robert Pack
- Dave Severns
- Jasen Powell (trainer)

Legend
- (DP) Unsigned draft pick
- (FA) Free agent
- (S) Suspended
- (DL) On assignment to D-League affiliate
- Injured

Roster
Updated: April 23, 2012

=== Roster notes ===
- Forward Caron Butler becomes the 17th former Laker to play with the crosstown rival Clippers.
- Forward Bobby Simmons makes his second tour of duty with the Clippers. He played for the team from 2003 to 2005.
- The first year of the "Lob City" Clippers trio - Chris Paul, Blake Griffin, and DeAndre Jordan - who remained together until 2018.

== Pre-season ==
Due to the 2011 NBA lockout negotiations, the programmed pre-season schedule, along with the first two weeks of the regular season were scrapped, and a two-game pre-season was set for each team once the lockout concluded.

2011 pre-season game log
Pre-season: 2–0 (home: 1–0; road: 1–0)

Game	Date	Team	Score	High points	High rebounds	High assists	Location Attendance	Record
1	December 19	@ L. A. Lakers	W 114–95	Chauncey Billups (23)	Chris Paul (7)	Chris Paul (9)	Staples Center	1–0
2	December 21	L. A. Lakers	W 108–103	Blake Griffin (30)	DeAndre Jordan (7)	Chris Paul (10)	Staples Center	2–0

2011–12 season schedule

== Regular season ==
=== Standings ===
Pacific Division	W	L	PCT	GB	Home	Road	Div	GP
y-Los Angeles Lakers	41	25	.621	–	26‍–‍7	15‍–‍18	9–5	66
x-Los Angeles Clippers	40	26	.606	1.0	24‍–‍9	16‍–‍17	7–7	66
Phoenix Suns	33	33	.500	8.0	19‍–‍14	14‍–‍19	9–5	66
Golden State Warriors	23	43	.348	18.0	12‍–‍21	11‍–‍22	7–8	66
Sacramento Kings	22	44	.333	19.0	16‍–‍17	6‍–‍27	3–10	66

Western Conference
#	Team	W	L	PCT	GB	GP
1	c-San Antonio Spurs *	50	16	.758	–	66
2	y-Oklahoma City Thunder *	47	19	.712	3.0	66
3	y-Los Angeles Lakers *	41	25	.621	9.0	66
4	x-Memphis Grizzlies	41	25	.621	9.0	66
5	x-Los Angeles Clippers	40	26	.606	10.0	66
6	x-Denver Nuggets	38	28	.576	12.0	66
7	x-Dallas Mavericks	36	30	.545	14.0	66
8	x-Utah Jazz	36	30	.545	14.0	66
9	Houston Rockets	34	32	.515	16.0	66
10	Phoenix Suns	33	33	.500	17.0	66
11	Portland Trail Blazers	28	38	.424	22.0	66
12	Minnesota Timberwolves	26	40	.394	24.0	66
13	Golden State Warriors	23	43	.348	27.0	66
14	Sacramento Kings	22	44	.333	28.0	66
15	New Orleans Hornets	21	45	.318	29.0	66

=== Game log ===
2011–12 game log
Total: 40–26 (home: 24–9; road: 16–17)
December: 1–2 (home: 0–1; road: 1–1)

Game	Date	Team	Score	High points	High rebounds	High assists	Location Attendance	Record
1	December 25	@ Golden State	W 105–86	Blake Griffin (22)	Caron Butler (10)	Chris Paul (9)	Oracle Arena; 19,596	1–0
2	December 28	@ San Antonio	L 90–115	Blake Griffin (28)	Blake Griffin (9)	Chris Paul (9)	AT&T Center; 18,581	1–1
3	December 30	Chicago	L 101–114	Blake Griffin (34)	Blake Griffin (13)	Chris Paul (14)	Staples Center	1–2

January: 11–4 (home: 10–1; road: 1–3)

Game	Date	Team	Score	High points	High rebounds	High assists	Location Attendance	Record
4	January 1	Portland	W 93–88	Blake Griffin (20)	DeAndre Jordan (11)	Chris Paul (7)	Staples Center; 19,060	2–2
5	January 4	Houston	W 117–89	Blake Griffin (22)	Blake Griffin (9)	Chris Paul (10)	Staples Center; 19,060	3–2
6	January 7	Milwaukee	W 92–86	Blake Griffin (22)	Blake Griffin (14)	Chris Paul (7)	Staples Center; 19,229	4–2
7	January 10	@ Portland	L 97–105	Caron Butler (20)	Blake Griffin (12)	Chauncey Billups; Mo Williams (4)	Rose Garden; 20,381	4–3
8	January 11	Miami	W 95–89 (OT)	Chris Paul (27)	Blake Griffin (12)	Chris Paul (11)	Staples Center; 19,341	5–3
9	January 14	L. A. Lakers	W 102–94	Chris Paul (33)	Blake Griffin (14)	Chris Paul (6)	Staples Center; 19,895	6–3
10	January 16	New Jersey	W 101–91	Blake Griffin (23)	Blake Griffin (14)	Randy Foye (10)	Staples Center; 19,060	7–3
11	January 17	@ Utah	L 79–108	Caron Butler (14)	Blake Griffin (11)	Chauncey Billups (6)	EnergySolutions Arena; 19,371	7–4
12	January 18	Dallas	W 91–89	Mo Williams (26)	Blake Griffin (17)	Blake Griffin (7)	Staples Center; 19,252	8–4
13	January 20	Minnesota	L 98–101	Mo Williams (25)	DeAndre Jordan (11)	Mo Williams (5)	Staples Center; 19,492	8–5
14	January 22	Toronto	W 103–91	Mo Williams (26)	DeAndre Jordan (16)	Chauncey Billups (14)	Staples Center; 19,060	9–5
15	January 25	@ L. A. Lakers	L 91–96	Blake Griffin (26)	Blake Griffin (9)	Chris Paul (12)	Staples Center; 18,997	9–6
16	January 26	Memphis	W 98–91	Blake Griffin (20)	Blake Griffin; DeAndre Jordan (9)	Blake Griffin (8)	Staples Center; 19,275	10–6
17	January 29	@ Denver	W 109–105	Chauncey Billups (32)	Blake Griffin; DeAndre Jordan (13)	Chris Paul (7)	Pepsi Center; 19,495	11–6
18	January 30	Oklahoma City	W 112–100	Chris Paul (26)	DeAndre Jordan (11)	Chris Paul (14)	Staples Center; 19,404	12–6

February : 8–6 (home: 2–3; road: 6–3)

Game	Date	Team	Score	High points	High rebounds	High assists	Location Attendance	Record
19	February 1	@ Utah	W 107–105	Chris Paul (34)	Blake Griffin (14)	Chris Paul (11)	EnergySolutions Arena; 19,637	13–6
20	February 2	Denver	L 91–112	Blake Griffin (18)	DeAndre Jordan (9)	Chris Paul (9)	Staples Center; 19,223	13–7
21	February 4	@ Washington	W 107–81	Blake Griffin (21)	Blake Griffin; DeAndre Jordan (11)	Blake Griffin; Mo Williams (8)	Verizon Center; 19,419	14–7
22	February 6	@ Orlando	W 107–102 (OT)	Chris Paul (29)	Blake Griffin (10)	Chris Paul (8)	Amway Center; 18,846	15–7
23	February 8	@ Cleveland	L 92–99	Blake Griffin (25)	Blake Griffin (15)	Chris Paul (12)	Quicken Loans Arena; 17,100	15–8
24	February 10	@ Philadelphia	W 78–77	Chris Paul (24)	Blake Griffin (11)	Three players (4)	Wells Fargo Center; 20,539	16–8
25	February 11	@ Charlotte	W 111–86	Blake Griffin (21)	DeAndre Jordan (12)	Chris Paul (14)	Time Warner Cable Arena; 19,110	17–8
26	February 13	@ Dallas	L 92–96	Caron Butler (23)	DeAndre Jordan (9)	Chris Paul (9)	American Airlines Center; 20,436	17–9
27	February 15	Washington	W 102–84	Blake Griffin (23)	Blake Griffin (15)	Chris Paul (9)	Staples Center; 19,135	18–9
28	February 16	@ Portland	W 74–71	Blake Griffin (21)	Blake Griffin (14)	Randy Foye (4)	Staples Center; 20,665	19–9
29	February 18	San Antonio	L 100–103 (OT)	Blake Griffin (22)	Blake Griffin (20)	Chris Paul (6)	Staples Center; 19,217	19–10
30	February 20	@ Golden State	L 97–104	Chris Paul (24)	Reggie Evans (12)	Chris Paul (6)	Oracle Arena; 19,596	19–11
31	February 22	Denver	W 103–95	Chris Paul (36)	DeAndre Jordan (16)	Chris Paul (9)	Staples Center; 19,163	20–11
32	February 28	Minnesota	L 97–109	Blake Griffin (30)	DeAndre Jordan (14)	Chris Paul; Mo Williams (6)	Staples Center; 19,243	20–12

March: 11–9 (home: 8–3; road: 3–6)

Game	Date	Team	Score	High points	High rebounds	High assists	Location Attendance	Record
33	March 1	@ Sacramento	W 108–100	Chris Paul (22)	Blake Griffin (9)	Chris Paul (9)	Power Balance Pavilion; 15,512	21–12
34	March 2	@ Phoenix	L 78–81	Blake Griffin (17)	Caron Butler; Kenyon Martin (8)	Chris Paul (5)	US Airways Center; 18,091	21–13
35	March 4	@ Houston	W 105–103 (OT)	Chris Paul (28)	Blake Griffin, DeAndre Jordan (11)	Chris Paul (10)	Toyota Center; 16,646	22–13
36	March 5	@ Minnesota	L 94–95	Blake Griffin (26)	Blake Griffin, DeAndre Jordan (12)	Chris Paul (5)	Target Center; 19,509	22–14
37	March 7	@ New Jersey	L 100–101	Blake Griffin (28)	Blake Griffin (17)	Chris Paul (10)	Prudential Center; 18,711	22–15
38	March 9	@ San Antonio	W 120–108	Chris Paul (36)	Reggie Evans (13)	Chris Paul (11)	AT&T Center; 18,581	23–15
39	March 11	Golden State	L 93–97	Blake Griffin (27)	Reggie Evans; Blake Griffin (12)	Chris Paul (5)	Staples Center; 19,183	23–16
40	March 12	Boston	L 85–94	Blake Griffin (24)	DeAndre Jordan (13)	Chris Paul (5)	Staples Center; 19,464	23–17
41	March 14	Atlanta	W 96–82	Mo Williams (25)	Reggie Evans; Blake Griffin (210)	Chris Paul (9)	Staples Center; 19,060	24–17
42	March 15	Phoenix	L 87–91	Blake Griffin (25)	DeAndre Jordan (9)	Chris Paul (11)	Staples Center; 19,060	24–18
43	March 17	Houston	W 95–91	Chris Paul (23)	DeAndre Jordan (11)	Chris Paul (5)	Staples Center; 19,060	25–18
44	March 18	Detroit	W 87–83 (OT)	Chris Paul (19)	Blake Griffin (11)	Chris Paul (15)	Staples Center; 19,060	26–18
45	March 20	@ Indiana	L 89–102	Blake Griffin (23)	Blake Griffin; DeAndre Jordan (10)	Chris Paul (8)	Bankers Life Fieldhouse; 14,901	26–19
46	March 21	@ Oklahoma City	L 91–114	Randy Foye (23)	Blake Griffin (7)	Chris Paul (10)	Chesapeake Energy Arena; 18,203	26–20
47	March 22	@ New Orleans	L 90–97	Blake Griffin (21)	Blake Griffin (11)	Chris Paul (9)	New Orleans Arena; 17,209	26–21
48	March 24	Memphis	W 101–85	Blake Griffin (20)	Blake Griffin (10)	Chris Paul (13)	Staples Center; 19,060	27–21
49	March 26	New Orleans	W 97–85	Chris Paul (25)	Blake Griffin (7)	Chris Paul (10)	Staples Center; 19,060	28–21
50	March 28	Phoenix	W 103–86	Blake Griffin (27)	Blake Griffin (14)	Chris Paul (15)	Staples Center; 19,060	29–21
51	March 30	Portland	W 98–97	Three players (20)	Blake Griffin (13)	Chris Paul (14)	Staples Center; 19,060	30–21
52	March 31	Utah	W 105–96	Chris Paul (26)	DeAndre Jordan (10)	Three players (6)	Staples Center; 19,060	31–21

April: 9–5 (home: 4–1; road: 5–4)

Game	Date	Team	Score	High points	High rebounds	High assists	Location Attendance	Record
53	April 2	@ Dallas	W 94–75	Randy Foye (28)	Blake Griffin (16)	Chris Paul (10)	American Airlines Center; 20,479	32–21
54	April 4	L. A. Lakers	L 108–113	Caron Butler (28)	Blake Griffin (9)	Chris Paul (8)	Staples Center; 19,819	32–22
55	April 5	@ Sacramento	W 93–85	Randy Foye (20)	Blake Griffin (14)	Chris Paul (16)	Power Balance Pavilion; 14,411	33–22
56	April 7	Sacramento	W 109–94	Blake Griffin (27)	Blake Griffin (14)	Chris Paul (15)	Staples Center; 19,060	34–22
57	April 9	@ Memphis	L 85–94	Chris Paul (21)	DeAndre Jordan (14)	Chris Paul (6)	FedEx Forum; 17,219	34–23
58	April 11	@ Oklahoma City	W 100–98	Chris Paul (31)	Blake Griffin (12)	Blake Griffin (7)	Chesapeake Energy Arena; 18,203	35–23
59	April 12	@ Minnesota	W 95–82	Blake Griffin (19)	Blake Griffin (13)	Chris Paul (8)	Target Center; 16,016	36–23
60	April 14	Golden State	W 112–104	Chris Paul (28)	Blake Griffin (9)	Chris Paul (13)	Staples Center; 19,060	37–23
61	April 16	Oklahoma City	W 92–77	Nick Young (19)	DeAndre Jordan (12)	Chris Paul (10)	Staples Center; 19,516	38–23
62	April 18	@ Denver	W 104–98	Chris Paul (21)	DeAndre Jordan (9)	Chris Paul (8)	Pepsi Center; 17,219	39–23
63	April 19	@ Phoenix	L 90–93	Chris Paul (19)	Blake Griffin (11)	Chris Paul (10)	US Airways Center; 14,644	39–24
64	April 22	New Orleans	W 107–98	Chris Paul (33)	Blake Griffin (15)	Chris Paul (13)	Staples Center; 19,060	40–24
65	April 24	@ Atlanta	L 102–109	Blake Griffin (36)	DeAndre Jordan (9)	Chris Paul (8)	Philips Arena; 18,223	40–25
66	April 25	@ New York	L 93–99	Blake Griffin (29)	Blake Griffin; DeAndre Jordan (10)	Blake Griffin (6)	Madison Square Garden; 19,763	40–26

2011–12 season schedule

== Playoffs ==
2012 playoff game log
First Round: 4–3 (home: 2–1; road: 2–2)

Game	Date	Team	Score	High points	High rebounds	High assists	Location Attendance	Series
1	April 29	@ Memphis	W 99–98	Nick Young (19)	Reggie Evans (13)	Chris Paul (11)	FedExForum; 18,119	1–0
2	May 2	@ Memphis	L 98–105	Chris Paul (29)	Blake Griffin (9)	Chris Paul (6)	FedExForum; 18,119	1–1
3	May 5	Memphis	W 87–86	Chris Paul (24)	Reggie Evans (11)	Chris Paul (11)	Staples Center; 19,060	2–1
4	May 7	Memphis	W 101–97 (OT)	Blake Griffin (30)	Chris Paul (9)	Griffin, Paul (7)	Staples Center; 19,167	3–1
5	May 9	@ Memphis	L 80–92	Mo Williams (20)	Blake Griffin (11)	Chris Paul (4)	FedExForum; 18,119	3–2
6	May 11	Memphis	L 88–90	Blake Griffin (15)	Reggie Evans (10)	Chris Paul (7)	Staples Center; 19,060	3–3
7	May 13	@ Memphis	W 82–72	Chris Paul (19)	Kenyon Martin (10)	Chris Paul (4)	FedExForum; 18,119	4–3

Conference semifinals: 0–4 (home: 0–2; road: 0–2)

Game	Date	Team	Score	High points	High rebounds	High assists	Location Attendance	Series
1	May 15	@ San Antonio	L 92–108	Eric Bledsoe (23)	Griffin, Jordan (9)	Chris Paul (10)	AT&T Center; 18,581	0–1
2	May 17	@ San Antonio	L 88–105	Blake Griffin (20)	DeAndre Jordan (7)	Chris Paul (5)	AT&T Center; 18,581	0–2
3	May 19	San Antonio	L 86–96	Blake Griffin (28)	Blake Griffin (16)	Chris Paul (11)	Staples Center; 19,060	0–3
4	May 20	San Antonio	L 99–102	Chris Paul (23)	DeAndre Jordan (8)	Chris Paul (11)	Staples Center; 19,060	0–4

2012 schedule

== Injuries and surgeries ==
Player	Injury Date	Injury Type
Chauncey Billups	February 6, 2012	Torn left Achilles tendon (out for the season)
Caron Butler	April 29, 2012	Broken bone in left hand (out for 1 game)

== Player statistics ==
Legend
GP	Games played	GS	Games started	MPG	Minutes per game
FG%	Field-goal percentage	3P%	3-point field-goal percentage	FT%	Free-throw percentage
RPG	Rebounds per game	APG	Assists per game	SPG	Steals per game
BPG	Blocks per game	PPG	Points per game

=== Regular season ===
Player	GP	GS	MPG	FG%	3P%	FT%	RPG	APG	SPG	BPG	PPG
Blake Griffin	66	66	36.2	.549	.125	.521	10.9	3.2	.8	.7	20.7
DeAndre Jordan	66	66	27.2	.632	.000	.525	8.3	.3	.5	2.0	7.4
Randy Foye	65	48	25.9	.398	.386	.859	2.1	2.2	.7	.4	11.0
Caron Butler	63	63	29.7	.407	.358	.813	3.7	1.2	.8	.1	12.0
Chris Paul	60	60	36.4	.478	.371	.861	3.6	9.1	2.5	.1	19.8
Reggie Evans	56	0	13.8	.472		.507	4.8	.3	.6	.1	1.9
Mo Williams	52	1	28.3	.426	.389	.900	1.9	3.1	1.0	.1	13.2
Kenyon Martin	42	0	22.4	.441	.231	.370	4.3	.4	1.0	1.0	5.2
Eric Bledsoe	40	1	11.6	.389	.200	.636	1.6	1.7	.8	.4	3.3
Ryan Gomes	32	2	13.3	.326	.138	.727	1.9	.4	.5	.0	2.3
Bobby Simmons	28	0	14.9	.311	.333	.571	2.0	.4	.5	.1	2.9
Trey Thompkins	24	0	5.0	.393	.308	.714	1.0	.1	.1	.1	2.4
Nick Young^{†}	22	3	23.5	.394	.353	.821	1.6	.5	.6	.3	9.7
Chauncey Billups	20	20	30.4	.364	.384	.895	2.5	4.0	.5	.2	15.0
Brian Cook^{†}	16	0	7.6	.224	.185	1.000	1.4	.1	.1	.3	1.9
Solomon Jones^{†}	10	0	9.6	.125		.800	1.7	.2	.4	.5	.6
Travis Leslie	10	0	4.5	.357		.444	.9	.5	.2	.2	1.4
Courtney Fortson^{†}	4	0	11.5	.417	.250	.667	2.0	1.3	.0	.0	4.3

=== Playoffs ===
Player	GP	GS	MPG	FG%	3P%	FT%	RPG	APG	SPG	BPG	PPG
Chris Paul	11	11	38.5	.427	.333	.872	5.1	7.9	2.7	.1	17.6
Blake Griffin	11	11	35.7	.500	.000	.636	6.9	2.5	1.8	.9	19.1
Randy Foye	11	11	26.5	.392	.438	.846	2.0	1.5	.5	.3	7.5
DeAndre Jordan	11	11	22.6	.525		.333	5.3	.4	.6	1.6	4.5
Mo Williams	11	0	20.8	.436	.364	.923	.8	1.4	.5	.5	9.6
Nick Young	11	0	18.2	.433	.515	.889	1.1	.3	.3	.4	8.3
Reggie Evans	11	0	18.0	.533		.425	7.3	.1	.8	.5	3.0
Kenyon Martin	11	0	17.5	.524		.625	3.2	.3	.4	1.7	4.5
Eric Bledsoe	11	0	17.2	.587	.429	.625	2.4	2.1	1.2	.4	7.9
Caron Butler	10	10	26.8	.359	.258	.750	3.0	1.0	.6	.2	8.6
Bobby Simmons	4	1	8.0	.556	.250		.3	.0	.0	.0	2.8

- ^{†} Denotes player spent time with another team in the season. Stats reflect time with the Clippers only.

== Transactions ==
=== Trades ===
December 14, 2011
March 15, 2012
To Los Angeles Clippers

Chris Paul

Two future second-round draft picks
To Los Angeles Clippers

Nick Young

To New Orleans Hornets

Al-Farouq Aminu

Eric Gordon

Chris Kaman

2012 first-round draft pick
To Washington Wizards

Brian Cook

2015 second-round draft pick

=== Free agents ===
==== Re-signed ====
Player	Signed	Contract
Brian Cook	July 1, 2011	One-year deal (Player Option)
DeAndre Jordan	December 12, 2011	4-year deal (Matched offer by Golden State Warriors)

==== Additions ====
Player	Signed	Former Team
Caron Butler	December 9, 2011	Dallas Mavericks
Chauncey Billups	December 12, 2011	New York Knicks
Reggie Evans	December 22, 2011	Toronto Raptors
Solomon Jones	January 4, 2012	Indiana Pacers
Courtney Fortson	January 16, 2012	Los Angeles D-Fenders (D-League)
Kenyon Martin	February 3, 2012	Xinjiang Guanghui Flying Tigers (CBA)
Bobby Simmons	February 27, 2012; Contract expired March 20; Re-signed March 24	Reno Bighorns (D-League)

==== Subtractions ====
Player	Reason left	New team
Ike Diogu	Renounced, December 9	San Antonio Spurs
Jamario Moon	Renounced, December 9	Los Angeles D-Fenders (D-League)
Craig Smith	Renounced, December 9	Portland Trail Blazers
Willie Warren	Waived, December 19	Rio Grande Valley Vipers (D-League)
Courtney Fortson	Waived, January 27	Los Angeles D-Fenders (D-League)
Solomon Jones	Waived, February 7	New Orleans Hornets
