= Josh Selby =

American basketball player (born 1991)

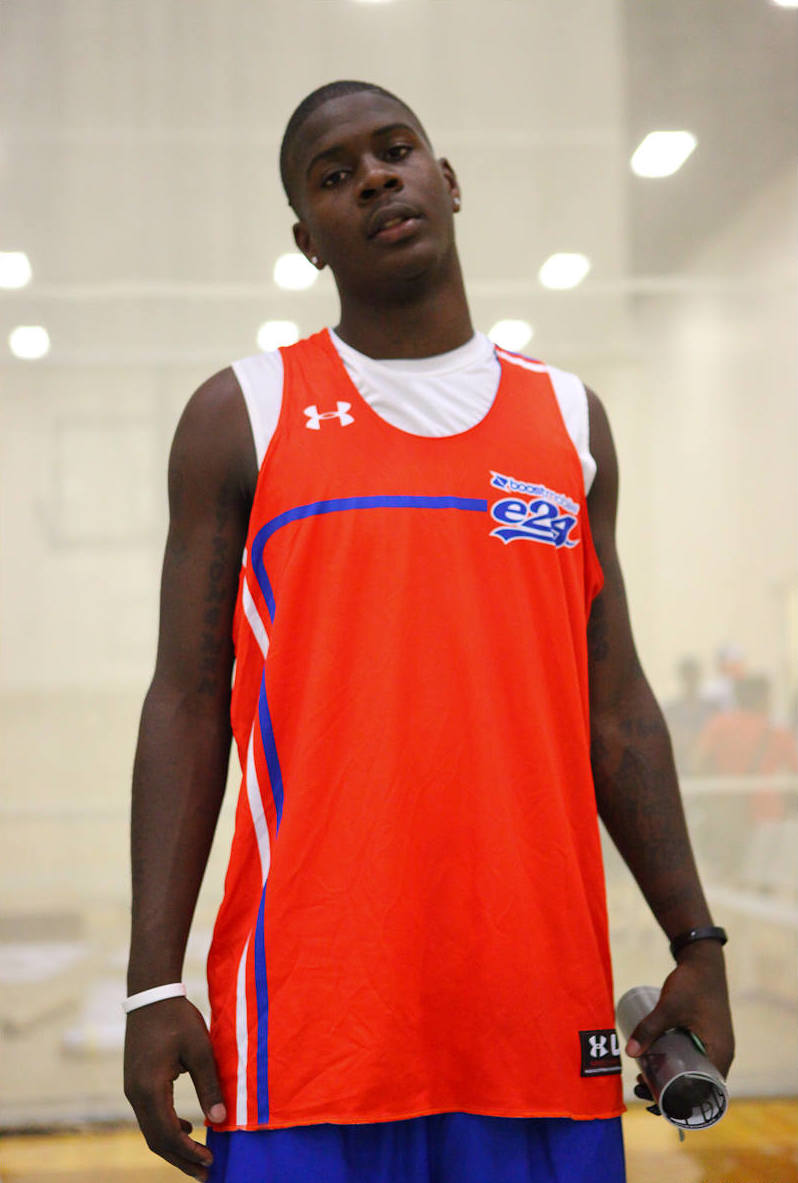
- Selby in 2010

Personal information
- Born: March 27, 1991 (age 35) Baltimore, Maryland, U.S.
- Listed height: 6 ft 2 in (1.88 m)
- Listed weight: 183 lb (83 kg)

Career information
- High school: John Carroll (Bel Air, Maryland); DeMatha (Hyattsville, Maryland); Lake Clifton (Baltimore, Maryland); Parkville (Baltimore, Maryland)
- College: Kansas (2010–2011)
- NBA draft: 2011: 2nd round, 49th overall pick
- Drafted by: Memphis Grizzlies
- Playing career: 2011–2022
- Position: Point guard
- Number: 1, 2, 8, 25, 32

Career history
- 2011–2013: Memphis Grizzlies
- 2012: →Reno Bighorns
- 2013: Canton Charge
- 2013: Maine Red Claws
- 2013: Qingdao Eagles
- 2014: Cedevita Zagreb
- 2014–2015: Bnei Herzliya
- 2015–2016: Socar Petkim
- 2017: Maccabi Kiryat Gat
- 2017–2018: Incheon Elephants
- 2018: Ferro Carril Oeste
- 2019: San Lázaro
- 2021: Franklin Bulls
- 2021: Pieno žvaigždės Pasvalys
- 2022: Edmonton Stingers

Career highlights
- 2× Israeli League All-Star (2015, 2017); McDonald's All-American (2010); Second-team Parade All-American (2010)
- Stats at NBA.com
- Stats at Basketball Reference

Joshua Cornell Selby (born March 27, 1991) is a former American professional basketball player. He played one year of college basketball with the Kansas Jayhawks before being selected by the Memphis Grizzlies with the 49th pick in the 2011 NBA draft.

== High school and recruitment ==
Selby attended Lake Clifton High School in Baltimore for his senior year, having previously attended DeMatha Catholic High School in Hyattsville, Maryland and The John Carroll School in Bel Air, Maryland. He averaged 32 points, seven assists, five rebounds, and two steals per game during his senior season.

Selby originally committed to play for the University of Tennessee but decommitted in July 2009. On April 17, 2010, Selby committed to the Kansas Jayhawks at the 2010 Jordan Brand Classic at Madison Square Garden live on ESPN2. Selby picked the Jayhawks over a final list of teams including Kentucky, UConn, Arizona and Tennessee. Selby was the highest-rated player ever signed by Kansas coach Bill Self as he was the #1 rated recruit on the recruiting website Rivals.com.

He was named a 2010 McDonald's All-American and scored 13 points for the East team in the game. Selby was also the winner of the dunk contest before the game.

College recruiting
Name	Hometown	School	Height	Weight	Commit date
Josh Selby; PG	Baltimore	Lake Clifton HS	6 ft 2 in (1.88 m)	183 lb (83 kg)	Apr 17, 2010
Josh Selby; PG	Recruit ratings: Scout: Rivals: (97)				
Overall Recruiting Rankings: Rivals: #1 Scout: #5 ESPN: #5

== College career ==
On December 18, 2010, following a nine-game suspension Selby joined the 2010–11 Jayhawks, scoring 21 points in 27 minutes and making 5 of 8 three-point shots. While Selby sat out, Kansas led the country in many statistical categories. As a result of his suspension and later injuries, Selby played in only 26 of the team's 38 games and averaged only 14 minutes per game after returning from injury. For the season, he averaged 7.9 points and 2.2 assists in 20.4 minutes per game.

=== Controversy ===
After choosing to attend Kansas, a report said Selby had not yet been cleared to play by the NCAA. According to this report, the NCAA had been investigating for months the relationship between Selby and Robert "Bay" Frazier, the business manager for New York Knicks star Carmelo Anthony. Selby had acknowledged a friendship with Anthony in past interviews and spoke of his contact with Frazier in an April story in The New York Times. All three are Baltimore natives. Maeshon Witherspoon, Selby's mother, told The Times that she had known Bay since elementary school and had asked him to serve as an adviser during his college recruitment. The Times report said Witherspoon asked Frazier to host Selby's in-home visits with college coaches at his own home and that Frazier attended a KU–Missouri game at Allen Fieldhouse in January 2009.

On November 21, 2010, the NCAA made its final ruling on the matter, suspending Selby for nine games and ordering him to pay $4,607.58, the total of the "improper benefits" received from Frazier, to the charity of his choice.

NBA teams were reluctant to draft Selby due to a perceived selfish style of play and negative attitude off the court.

== Professional career ==
On April 14, 2011, Selby announced via Twitter that he would enter his name in the 2011 NBA draft.

On June 23, 2011, Selby was selected as the 49th pick in the 2011 NBA draft by the Memphis Grizzlies, joining other former University of Kansas players Xavier Henry and Darrell Arthur on the Grizzlies roster.

On December 10, 2011, Selby signed a contract with the Memphis Grizzlies. He was assigned to the Reno Bighorns on February 12, 2012.

In the 2012 NBA Summer League, Selby earned co-MVP honors with Damian Lillard.

Selby was reassigned to the Reno Bighorns on December 17, 2012. He was recalled on December 22, 2012.

On January 22, 2013, Selby was traded along with Marreese Speights, Wayne Ellington and a future first-round draft pick to the Cleveland Cavaliers in exchange for Jon Leuer. The Cavaliers assigned Selby to the Canton Charge of the Development League on January 24, 2013. On March 3, 2013, Selby was waived by the Cavaliers. On March 7, 2013, he was acquired by the Maine Red Claws.

In September 2013, he signed with the Qingdao Eagles of China. On November 16, 2013, he was waived by the Eagles. On January 7, 2014, he signed with Cedevita Zagreb of Croatia. On February 5, 2014, he parted ways with Cedevita.

In August 2014, he signed a one-year deal with Bnei Herzliya of the Israeli Basketball Premier League.

In November 2015, he signed with Socar Petkim of the Turkish Basketball Second League.

In August 2016, he signed with Best Balıkesir of the Turkish Basketball Super League. However, he left the club two months later before appearing in an official game for them. On January 12, 2017, he signed with Israeli club Maccabi Kiryat Gat. For the 2017–18 season, Selby joined the Incheon Elephants of the Korean Basketball League. He played 36 games (27 starts) during the KBL season, averaging 17.4 points, 3.4 rebounds and 3.9 assists in 25.7 minutes of playing time. He later had a one-game stint in Argentina with Ferro Carril Oeste of the Liga Nacional de Básquet. In June 2019, he had a three-game stint with San Lázaro in the Dominican Republic, playing during the Torneo de Baloncesto Superior del Distrito Nacional.

On June 23, 2020, Selby signed with Kumanovo of the Macedonian First League. He left the team before appearing in a game for them.

On January 15, 2021, Selby signed with the Franklin Bulls for the 2021 New Zealand NBL season. He left the team on June 1, 2021, after sustaining an injury.

On August 28, 2021, he signed with Pieno žvaigždės Pasvalys of the Lithuanian Basketball League.

== Career statistics ==
Legend
GP	Games played	GS	Games started	MPG	Minutes per game
FG%	Field goal percentage	3P%	3-point field goal percentage	FT%	Free throw percentage
RPG	Rebounds per game	APG	Assists per game	SPG	Steals per game
BPG	Blocks per game	PPG	Points per game	**Bold**	Career high

=== NBA ===
==== Regular season ====
Year	Team	GP	GS	MPG	FG%	3P%	FT%	RPG	APG	SPG	BPG	PPG
2011–12	Memphis	**28**	0	**8.5**	**.404**	.133	**.786**	**.5**	**1.1**	**.2**	.0	**2.3**
2012–13	Memphis	10	0	5.9	.273	**.167**	.636	**.5**	.4	**.2**	.0	2.0
Career		38	0	7.8	.330	.143	.720	.5	.9	.2	.0	2.2

==== Playoffs ====
Year	Team	GP	GS	MPG	FG%	3P%	FT%	RPG	APG	SPG	BPG	PPG
2012	Memphis	1	0	.0	–	–	–	.0	.0	.0	.0	.0

=== College ===
Year	Team	GP	GS	MPG	FG%	3P%	FT%	RPG	APG	SPG	BPG	PPG
2010–11	Kansas	26	11	20.4	.373	.362	.757	2.2	2.2	0.8	0.1	7.9
