= History of the Memphis Grizzlies =

The Memphis Grizzlies are a professional basketball team based in Memphis, Tennessee.

== 1995–2001: Vancouver Grizzlies ==
The Vancouver Grizzlies were a Canadian professional basketball team based in Vancouver, British Columbia. They were part of the Midwest Division of the Western Conference of the National Basketball Association (NBA). The team was established in 1995, along with the Toronto Raptors, as part of the NBA's expansion into Canada. Following the 2000–01 season, the team relocated to Memphis, Tennessee, United States, and were renamed as the Memphis Grizzlies. The team played their home games at General Motors Place for the entirety of their six seasons in Vancouver.

== Relocation to Memphis ==
The Vancouver Grizzlies applied with the NBA to relocate to Memphis on March 26, 2001, and it was granted. This led to the Grizzlies became the first major professional sports team from the "big four" major pro sports leagues to permanently play its home games in Memphis, as well as leaving the Toronto Raptors to be the only Canadian basketball team in the NBA. Memphis became the easternmost city in the Western Conference. In their first three seasons in Memphis, the Grizzlies played their home games at the Pyramid Arena.

== 2001–2008: The Pau Gasol era ==
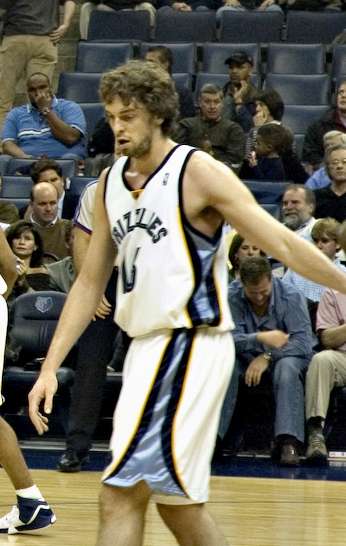
Pau Gasol as a member of the Grizzlies.

In the 2001 NBA draft, the Atlanta Hawks chose Pau Gasol as the 3rd overall pick, who was traded to the Grizzlies. Forward Shane Battier was selected with the 7th pick in the same draft by the Vancouver Grizzlies. They also acquired Jason Williams from the Sacramento Kings in exchange for Mike Bibby that same year. After the Grizzlies' first season in Memphis, Gasol won the NBA Rookie of the Year Award. The Grizzlies also drafted Shane Battier, who quickly became an unofficial spokesman for the team and a fan favorite. However, despite the strong draft class, general manager Billy Knight was let go. After Knight's departure and the season, the team hired former Los Angeles Laker and Hall of Famer Jerry West as general manager in 2002, who later received the 2003–04 NBA Executive of the Year Award. After West's arrival the team was changed a great deal from Knight's team, with the removal of Sidney Lowe as head coach after 0–8 start to the season and a great deal of player movement, with players such as Mike Miller and James Posey becoming vital to the team's success. During the 2002–03 season, Hubie Brown was hired to coach the Grizzlies.

Brown won the NBA Coach of the Year Award during the next season when the Grizzlies made the NBA playoffs for the first time in team history in 2004 as the sixth seed in the Western Conference in a drastic change from being perennially one of the worst teams in the NBA. They also won a then record 50 games under Gasol and Williams. In the playoffs they faced the San Antonio Spurs, who swept them out of the playoffs in four games.

=== 2004–2007: Departure of Jason Williams, draft ===
Brown stepped down as head coach during the 2004–05 NBA season. At the time of his resignation, the Grizzlies had a losing record but West hired TNT analyst and former coach Mike Fratello to replace Brown. The Grizzlies' record improved and the team advanced to the postseason for the second consecutive season. However, the Grizzlies were swept out in the first round again, this time by the Phoenix Suns. After the season, which ended with anger between Fratello and many of the players, namely Bonzi Wells and Jason Williams, the team had an active 2005 off-season in which they revamped the team and added veterans. While the Grizzlies lost Wells, Williams, Stromile Swift, and James Posey, they acquired Damon Stoudamire, Bobby Jackson, Hakim Warrick, and Eddie Jones. They made the playoffs for the third consecutive year as well.

With their record they had the fifth seed in the Western Conference playoffs and would face the Dallas Mavericks, who swept the Grizzlies in 4 games.

Following the 2006 NBA draft, Jerry West traded Shane Battier to the Houston Rockets for their first round pick Rudy Gay and Stromile Swift. Before the 2006–07 season, they suffered a blow when Gasol broke his left foot while playing for Spain in the World Championships. The Grizzlies started the season 5–17 without Gasol, and then went 1–7 while he was limited to about 25 minutes per game. At that point, Fratello was fired and replaced by Tony Barone Sr. as interim coach. Barone was the team's player personnel director and had never coached an NBA game though he had coached at the collegiate level for both Creighton and Texas A&M being named coach of the year in their conferences three times during his tenure.

== 2007–2010: Struggles and the Climb Back to Relevancy ==
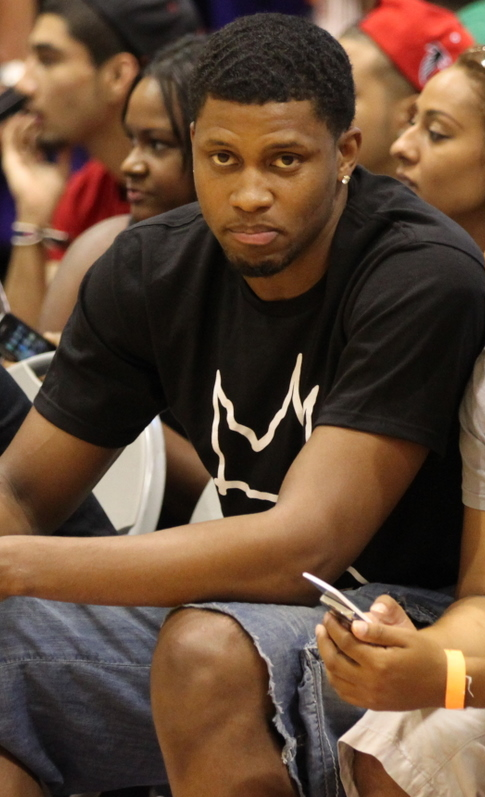
Rudy Gay played for the Grizzlies from 2006 to 2013.

The Grizzlies finished the 2006–07 season with a league-worst 22–60 record, and Jerry West announced his resignation from his position as the team's general manager shortly after the end of the regular season. The team also hired Marc Iavaroni, who was previously with the Phoenix Suns as an assistant coach, to be the team's new head coach. Despite the last-place finish, the Grizzlies, who held the best chance of landing the first pick, ended up with the fourth pick in the 2007 NBA draft, with which the Grizzlies selected Mike Conley Jr.

On June 18, 2007, the Grizzlies named former Boston Celtics GM Chris Wallace as the team's General Manager and Vice President of Basketball Operations, replacing the retired West. A few days later, they hired former Philadelphia 76ers and Orlando Magic head coach Johnny Davis, longtime NBA assistant coach Gordon Chiesa, and the head coach of the 2007 NBA Development League champion Dakota Wizards, David Joerger, as the team's new assistant coaches. Gene Bartow was named the Grizzlies' President of Basketball Operations on August 16, 2007. On February 1, 2008, Pau Gasol was traded to the Los Angeles Lakers for Kwame Brown, Javaris Crittenton, Aaron McKie, rights to Marc Gasol (Pau's younger brother), and 2008 and 2010 first-round draft picks.

On January 22, 2009, head coach Marc Iavaroni was fired and replaced on an interim basis by assistant coach Johnny Davis for two games. Lionel Hollins was named the Grizzlies' permanent head coach on January 25, 2009.

On June 25, 2009, with the second overall pick in the NBA Draft, Memphis selected Hasheem Thabeet, then selected DeMarre Carroll with the 27th overall pick. On September 9, 2009, the Grizzlies signed free agent Allen Iverson to a one-year, $3.5 million deal. He only played three games (none in Memphis) before he left for "personal problems". He was then waived by the Grizzlies. Following Iverson's departure, the Grizzlies improved. With new acquisition Zach Randolph playing at an All-Star level, Marc Gasol's improvement, and a commitment to defense, the Grizzlies were in playoff contention for much of the 2009–10 NBA season, before finishing 10th in the Western Conference with a win–loss record of 40–42.

== 2010–2017: Grit and Grind era ==
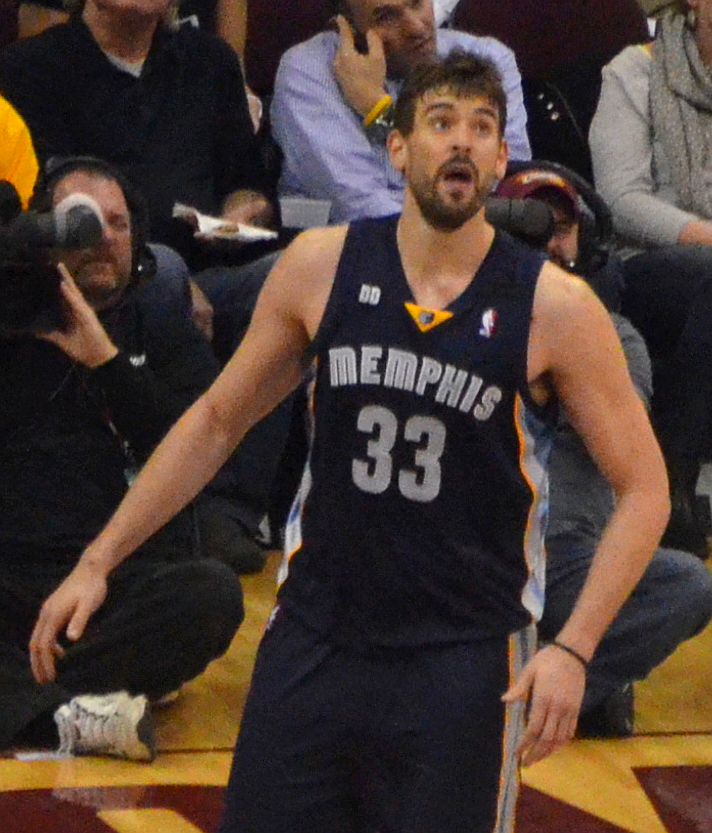
Marc Gasol.

Going into the 2010–11 season the Grizzlies celebrated the tenth year of basketball in Memphis. The season started with tremendous enthusiasm by the fan base in the Memphis area. Although the Grizzlies and their fans were celebrating the tenth season, the Grizzlies were also cheering for the 8th spot in the Western Conference Playoffs. They finished with a 46–36 record. The Grizzlies found their way back into the post-season for the first time in five years in the 2010–11 NBA season after a 101–96 home victory over the Sacramento Kings on April 8, 2011. While in the playoff hunt in February 2011, the Grizzlies traded Hasheem Thabeet, DeMarre Carroll, and a protected future first-round pick to the Houston Rockets for Shane Battier, and Ishmael Smith.

The team became known locally and nationally for its "Grit and Grind"-style of basketball which means disruptive defense through high pressure on the ball (they were the team with the most steals per game in 2010–11) and their inside-out offense (they were the highest scoring team in the paint also). The Grizzlies achieved several firsts in franchise history during the 2011 NBA Playoffs. Entering the playoffs as an eighth seed, the team won their first playoff game in franchise history on April 17, 2011, with a 101–98 victory on the road against the top seeded San Antonio Spurs. Memphis then won their first home playoff game when they beat the Spurs 91–88 on April 23, 2011. Finally, on April 29, the team won their first playoff series when they beat the Spurs in game 6, 99–91 to win the series 4 games to 2. This was only the fourth time in NBA history that an 8 seed defeated a 1 seed, and only the second time in a best-of-seven series (the first two were in a best-of-five series). The Grizzlies' historic season came to an end after the Oklahoma City Thunder defeated them in game 7 of the Western Conference Semifinals.

The team re-signed Marc Gasol, and Hamed Haddadi after the 2010–11 season.

The Grizzlies found their way back into the post-season for the second time in six years in the 2011–12 NBA season after a 103–91 home victory over the New Orleans Hornets on April 18, 2012. They finished the 2011–12 season with a 41–25 record, 4th in the Western Conference. However, they were eliminated in the first round by the Los Angeles Clippers in seven games.

During the 2012 off-season, the Grizzlies drafted Tony Wroten with the 25th overall pick. Their biggest signing in effort to improve their bench was bringing in Jerryd Bayless. They also acquired Wayne Ellington from the Minnesota Timberwolves in exchange for Dante Cunningham.

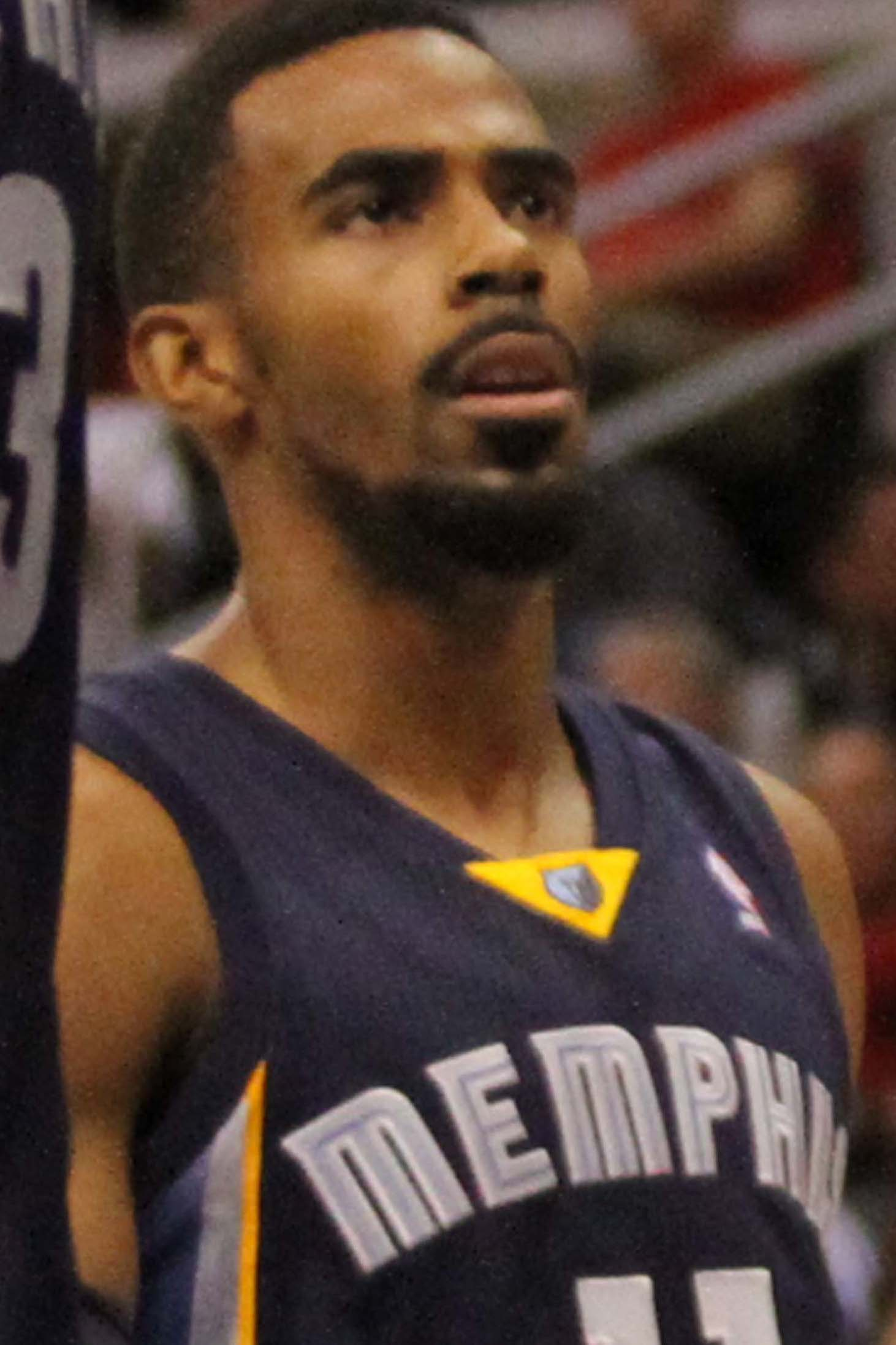
Mike Conley in 2011

On June 11, 2012, Michael Heisley reportedly had an agreement in principle to sell the Memphis Grizzlies to communications technology magnate Robert J. Pera, who at 34 had a spot on Forbes' 2012 list of the 10 youngest billionaires in the world. The purchase price was in the $350 million range. On August 23, 2012, Pera reached an agreement with a group of local partners including J.R. "Pitt" Hyde, Staley Cates, Ed Dobbs, Duncan Williams and Billy Orgel. On October 25, 2012, Robert Pera was officially approved as the owner of the Memphis Grizzlies. On November 4, 2012, Pera named Jason Levien the chief executive officer and Managing Partner of the Memphis Grizzlies. On December 13, 2012, ESPN announced that John Hollinger was hired by the Grizzlies as their new Vice President of Basketball Operations.

On January 23, 2013, the Grizzlies acquired Jon Leuer from the Cleveland Cavaliers in exchange for Marreese Speights, Wayne Ellington, Josh Selby, and a future first-round pick. On 30 January 2013, the Grizzlies traded Rudy Gay and Hamed Haddadi to the Toronto Raptors in a three team deal also involving the Detroit Pistons. The Grizzlies acquired Tayshaun Prince and Austin Daye from the Pistons and Ed Davis and a future second-round pick from the Raptors.

At the end of the season, Memphis finished with their best franchise record of 56–26, 2nd in the Division and as the 5th seed in the Playoffs. Also, Marc Gasol was NBA Defensive Player of the Year. In the opening round, Memphis defeated the Los Angeles Clippers in 6 Games after trailing in the series 0–2. This avenged their defeat from the previous year at the hands of the Clippers. Memphis then went on to the Western Conference finals for the first time in franchise history when they defeated the Oklahoma City Thunder 4–1 in their semi-finals series. This was a rematch of their meeting in the 2011 NBA Playoffs, which the Thunder won in 7 games. However, the Grizzlies' season ended in the conference finals as they were swept by the eventual conference champions, San Antonio Spurs in yet another rematch/reversal from the 2011 NBA Playoffs.

The Grizzlies struggled to begin the 2013–14 season, starting out at 14–18 with Marc Gasol out, and entered the All-Star break with a win–loss record of 29–23. They went 21–9 after, finishing in 3rd place in the Southwest division and in 7th place in the Western Conference with a win–loss record of 50–32, including a 14-game winning streak at FedExForum. They faced the Oklahoma City Thunder in the playoffs and had a record four straight overtimes from games 2–5, going 3–1 in the overtimes. The Grizzlies fell 4–3, despite an effort by Gasol in game 7 without Zach Randolph after he was suspended for punching Thunder center Steven Adams in game 6.

On October 29, 2014, the Grizzlies defeated the Minnesota Timberwolves 105-101 for the franchise's first victory in a season opener since 2000, the year before the team moved to Memphis. In the 2014–15 NBA season, the Grizzlies made the NBA playoffs as the 5th seed in the Western Conference. In the first round, the Grizzlies defeated the Portland Trail Blazers in five games. Games 4 and 5 were played without Mike Conley Jr., who in Game 3 suffered multiple facial fractures in a collision with Blazers guard CJ McCollum. In the second round, they found themselves facing off against the top seeded Golden State Warriors and MVP Stephen Curry. The Warriors took Game 1, and Conley returned in Game 2 to lead the Grizzlies to a 108–95 victory. Memphis took a 2–1 series lead before Golden State ultimately dispatched the Grizzlies in 6 games.

On April 1, 2016, the Grizzlies signed their 28th player for the season, an NBA record. On July 6, 2017, the team's management announced that Randolph's number 50 jersey would be retired in the future after he became a free agent, and eventually signed with the Sacramento Kings. Tony Allen also left and signed with the New Orleans Pelicans, closing the door on the "Grit and Grind" era.

=== 2017–2019: End of an era ===
With the departures of Randolph and Allen, the 2017–18 Grizzlies missed the playoffs for the first time since the 2009–10 season, and tied their longest losing streak in franchise history near the end of the season with 19 straight losses from January 31 to March 17, 2018, while suffering from their worst loss in franchise history during the regular season on March 22, losing to the Charlotte Hornets 140–79, all with their point guard Mike Conley Jr. missing all but 12 games due to injuries. The Grizzlies tried to be competitive again with Conley and others back in the beginning of the 2018–19 season, but were on the outside looking in as the trade deadline approached and they were standing at the 14th seed with a 22–33 record by February 5. The Grizzlies decided to move on from their two franchise players and the last remnants of the "Grit and Grind" era with Marc Gasol getting traded to the Toronto Raptors in exchange for Jonas Valančiūnas, Delon Wright, C. J. Miles, and a 2024 second-round draft pick. After the season, on July 6, Mike Conley Jr. was traded to the Utah Jazz in exchange for Grayson Allen, Kyle Korver, Jae Crowder and the 23rd pick of the 2019 NBA draft.

=== 2019–present: The Ja Morant era ===
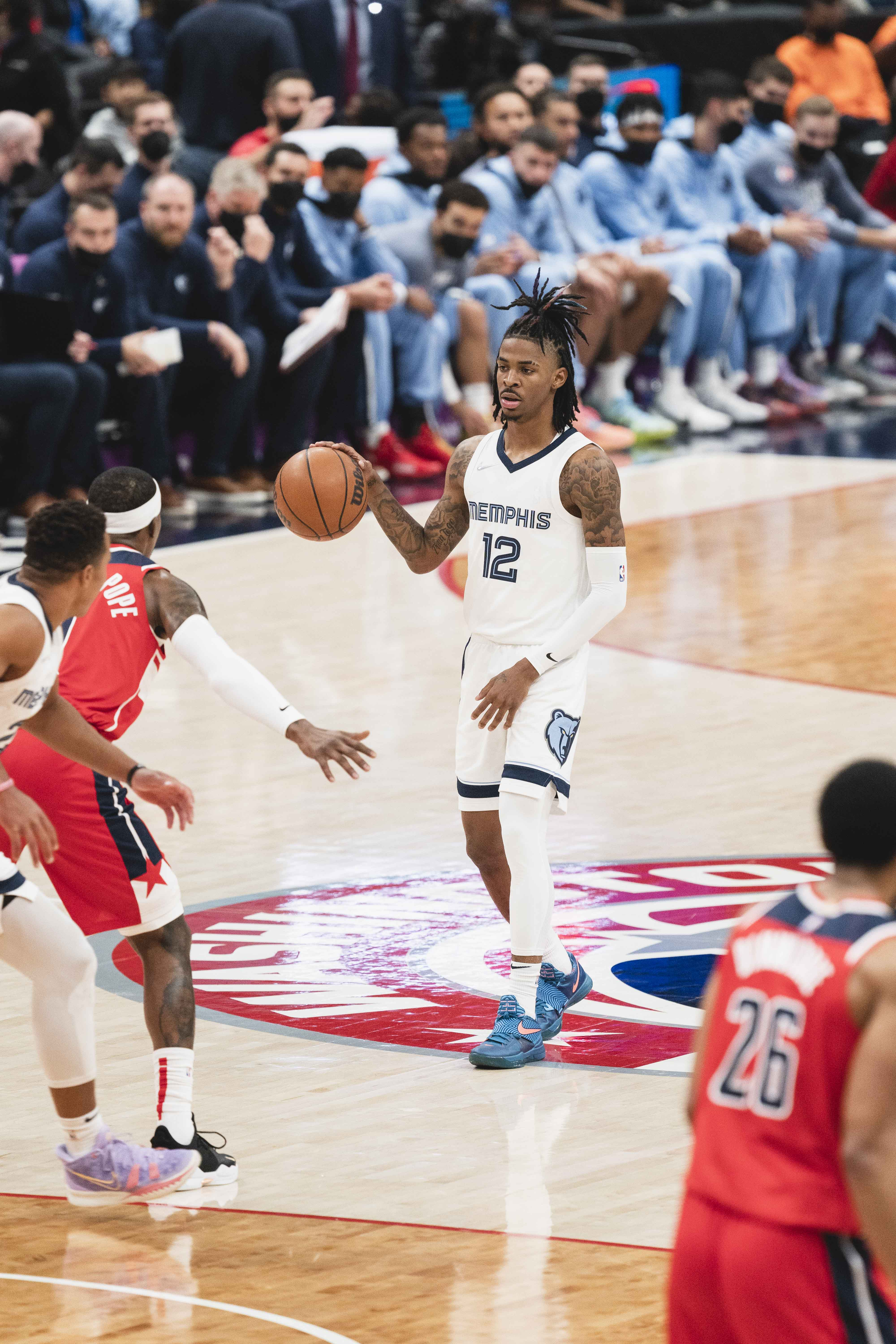
Ja Morant has played for the team since 2019.

After the end of the 2018–19 season, controlling owner Robert Pera announced a restructuring of the Grizzlies' basketball operations department: "In order to put our team on the path to sustainable success, it was necessary to change our approach to basketball operations". J. B. Bickerstaff was relieved from his duties as head coach and general manager Chris Wallace was reallocated to a role exclusively in player scouting. Jason Wexler was announced as team president and Zachary Kleiman was promoted to general manager and EVP of basketball operations.

On June 12, 2019, the Grizzlies announced Taylor Jenkins as the team's new head coach.

With the second pick in the 2019 NBA draft, the Grizzlies selected Ja Morant. Additionally, they received Brandon Clarke after he was selected by the Oklahoma City Thunder with the 21st pick, and then immediately traded to the Grizzlies for the 23rd pick (via the Utah Jazz) and the Grizzlies' 2024 second-round pick. The Grizzlies rebuilt their roster with a young core consisting of Morant, Clarke, Allen, Dillon Brooks, and Jaren Jackson Jr.

Following the suspension of the 2019–20 NBA season, the Grizzlies were one of the 22 teams invited to the NBA Bubble to participate in the final eight games of the regular season. They finished in ninth place in the Western Conference and had a chance to make it to the 2020 NBA playoffs, needing to win two games against the Portland Trail Blazers to advance. In the first and only play-in game, the Trail Blazers defeated the Grizzlies 126–122. At the conclusion of the season, Morant, who averaged 17.8 points and 7.3 assists per game, was named the NBA Rookie of the Year, earning 99 out of 100 first place votes on the ballot. Morant and teammate Brandon Clarke were also named to the 2019–20 NBA All-Rookie First Team.

The Grizzlies finished the COVID-shortened 2020–21 NBA season with a 38–34 record, earning them the ninth best record in the Western Conference and a chance to make the NBA playoffs through the play-in tournament by winning two games in a row. The Grizzlies did so with a 100–96 victory over the 10th-place San Antonio Spurs, at home on May 19, 2021 followed by a 117–112 victory over the 8th-place Golden State Warriors in San Francisco on May 21, 2021, to claim the Western Conference's 8th seed behind 35 points from Morant. The Grizzlies' first-round match-up pitted them against the Utah Jazz, who boasted the top record in the league. The Grizzlies upset the Jazz in Salt Lake City with a 112–109 victory in Game 1 but went on to lose the series in five games. Rookie wing Desmond Bane, acquired by Memphis with the 30th overall pick in the 2020 NBA draft, was selected to the 2020–21 NBA All-Rookie Second Team for his campaign that season.

The Grizzlies saw greater success in the following 2021–22 NBA season. By the All-Star break, the Grizzlies had recorded a record of 41–19, good for 3rd place in the West. On March 30, 2022, the Grizzlies clinched their first division title in franchise history and the Western Conference's second seed, their highest ever seeding placement, when they defeated the San Antonio Spurs. The Grizzlies finished the regular season with a record of 56–26. They would go on to defeat Minnesota in the first round before losing to the Golden State Warriors in the second round in 6 games.

The 2022–23 NBA season saw the Grizzlies finish 51–31, setting them up with the second seed in the West. Jaren Jackson Jr. was named an All Star for the first time and was also named the NBA Defensive Player of the Year during the season. After a season plagued by injuries and off the court issues, Memphis marched into the playoffs that saw them matched up against the Lakers. The Grizzlies would lose the first round series against the seventh seed Los Angeles Lakers (2–4).

In the off-season, the Grizzlies signed veteran and former MVP Derrick Rose and acquired Josh Christopher in a trade for Dillon Brooks. They started the 2023–24 NBA season off with zero wins and six losses, their worst start since the 2002–03 season. After being suspended for 25 games, Morant returned and hit the game winning buzzer beater in his first game back. After nine games back, Morant suffered a shoulder injury and was declared to miss the rest of the season. Additionally, Marcus Smart only appeared in 20 games this season, similar to how Derrick Rose only played in 24 games including 7 starts, as the Grizzlies wrapped up an injury riddled season with a record of 27–55, setting a record for the most players used in a season.
