= List of NBA team presidents =

This is a list of National Basketball Association team presidents.

== Key ==
^	Denotes leadership role for business operations
*	Denotes leadership role for basketball operations
~	Denotes part owner

== Current list ==
Team	Key executives	Date hired*	Additional information
Atlanta Hawks	Travis Schlenk* Steve Koonin^ Thad Sheely^	2019	List of Atlanta Hawks executives
Boston Celtics	Brad Stevens* Rich Gotham^	2021	
Brooklyn Nets	Sean Marks* John Abbamondi^ Jeff Gewirtz^	2016	List of Brooklyn Nets executives
Charlotte Hornets	Jeff Peterson* Fred Whitfield^	2024	List of Charlotte Hornets executives
Chicago Bulls	Michael Reinsdorf^ Bryson Graham*	2020	List of Chicago Bulls executives
Cleveland Cavaliers	Nic Barlage^ Koby Altman*	2017	List of Cleveland Cavaliers executives
Dallas Mavericks	Rick Welts^ Ethan Casson Masai Ujiri*	2026	List of Dallas Mavericks executives
Denver Nuggets	Calvin Booth* Josh Kroenke^	2017	List of Denver Nuggets executives
Detroit Pistons	Trajan Langdon* Melanie Harris^ Arn Tellem^	2018	List of Detroit Pistons executives
Golden State Warriors	Mike Dunleavy Jr.* Brandon Schneider^	2023	List of Golden State Warriors executives
Houston Rockets	Rafael Stone*	2020	List of Houston Rockets executives
Indiana Pacers	Kevin Pritchard* Rick Fuson^	2017	List of Indiana Pacers executives
Los Angeles Clippers	Lawrence Frank* Gillian Zucker^	2017	List of Los Angeles Clippers executives
Los Angeles Lakers	Rob Pelinka* Jeanie Buss^~ Tim Harris^	2020	List of Los Angeles Lakers executives
Memphis Grizzlies	Zachary Kleiman* Jason Wexler^	2019	List of Memphis Grizzlies executives
Miami Heat	Pat Riley* Nick Arison^~	1995	List of Miami Heat executives
Milwaukee Bucks	Jon Horst* Raven Jemison^ Peter Feigin^	2008	List of Milwaukee Bucks executives
Minnesota Timberwolves	Tim Connelly* Matthew Caldwell^ Matt Lloyd^	2021	List of Minnesota Timberwolves executives
New Orleans Pelicans	Dennis Lauscha^	2024	List of New Orleans Pelicans executives
New York Knicks	Leon Rose* David Hopkinson^	2020	List of New York Knicks executives
Oklahoma City Thunder	Sam Presti* Danny Barth^	2008	List of Oklahoma City Thunder executives
Orlando Magic	Jeff Weltman* Alex Martins^ Charles Freeman^	2017	List of Orlando Magic executives
Philadelphia 76ers	Mike Gansey* Josh Harris^~ Tad Brown^	2020	List of 76ers executives
Phoenix Suns	Jeff Bower* Jason Rowley^	2019	List of Phoenix Suns executives
Portland Trail Blazers	Chris McGowan^	2012	List of Portland Trail Blazers executives
Sacramento Kings	Matina Kolokotronis^ John Rinehart^	2017	List of Sacramento Kings executives
San Antonio Spurs	Gregg Popovich* R. C. Buford^	1994	List of San Antonio Spurs executives
Toronto Raptors	Bobby Webster* Michael Friisdahl^	2013	List of Toronto Raptors executives
Utah Jazz	Danny Ainge	2021	List of Utah Jazz executives
Washington Wizards	Michael Winger	2023	List of Washington Wizards executives

Notes

1. An asterisk (*) following 'Date of Hire' denotes Head of Basketball Operations. See the respective team articles for more information.

== Historical list ==
Team	Previous Key Executives
Atlanta Hawks	Mike Budenholzer* (2015–19)
Boston Celtics	Danny Ainge* (2003–2021) Rick Pitino* (1997–2001) Red Auerbach* (1970–1997 & 2001–2006)
Brooklyn Nets	David Levy^ (2019)
Charlotte Hornets	Mitch Kupchak*(2018–24) Carl Scheer* (1988–90)
Chicago Bulls	Artūras Karnišovas* (2020–2026) Jerry Krause* (1985–2003)
Cleveland Cavaliers	Len Komoroski^ (2003–22) Kerry Bubolz^ (2013–17)
Dallas Mavericks	Donnie Nelson* Terdema Ussery^ (1997–2017)
Denver Nuggets	Masai Ujiri* (2010–17)
Detroit Pistons	Stan Van Gundy* (2014–18) Joe Dumars* (2000–14)
Golden State Warriors	Bob Myers* Rick Welts^ (2012–21) Robert Rowell^ (2003–11)
Houston Rockets	Daryl Morey* (2008–20) Ray Patterson* (1972–90) Tad Brown^ (2006–21)
Indiana Pacers	Larry Bird* (2013–17) Bob Salyers^ Donnie Walsh^ Jim Morris^
Los Angeles Clippers	Doc Rivers* (2014–17)
Los Angeles Lakers	Magic Johnson* (2017–19)
Memphis Grizzlies	Chris Wallace* (2007–19) Jerry West* (2002–07) Jason Levien^ (2012–14)
Miami Heat	N/A
Milwaukee Bucks	Mike McCarthy^ (2016–17)
Minnesota Timberwolves	Gersson Rosas* (2019–21) Tom Thibodeau* (2016–19)
New Orleans Pelicans	David Griffin* (2019–2025) Hugh Weber^ (2007–12)
New York Knicks	Andrew Lustgarten^(2014–2022) Steve Mills* (2017–20) Phil Jackson* (2014–17) Donnie Walsh* (2008–11) Isiah Thomas* (2004–07) Scott Layden* (1999–2003) Ernie Grunfeld* (1996–99) Dave Checketts^ (1991–94)
Oklahoma City Thunder	N/A
Orlando Magic	Rob Hennigan* (2012–17)
Philadelphia 76ers	Bryan Colangelo* (2016–2018)
Phoenix Suns	Lon Babby* (2010–15) Brad Casper^ (2011–12)
Portland Trail Blazers	Neil Olshey* (2015–21) Larry Miller* (2007–12) Sarah Mensah^ (2009–12)
Sacramento Kings	Monte McNair* (2020–2025) Chris Granger^ (2013–2017)
San Antonio Spurs	Rick Pych^
Toronto Raptors	Bryan Colangelo* (2006–2013)
Utah Jazz	Steve Starks^
Washington Wizards	Tommy Sheppard* (2019–2023) Jim Van Stone^ Ernie Grunfeld* (2003–2019)

== See also ==
- NBA Executive of the Year Award
- List of NBA team owners
- List of NBA general managers
- List of current NBA head coaches
- List of current NBA broadcasters
