= Baldwin Harbor, New York =

- Hamlet and former census-designated place
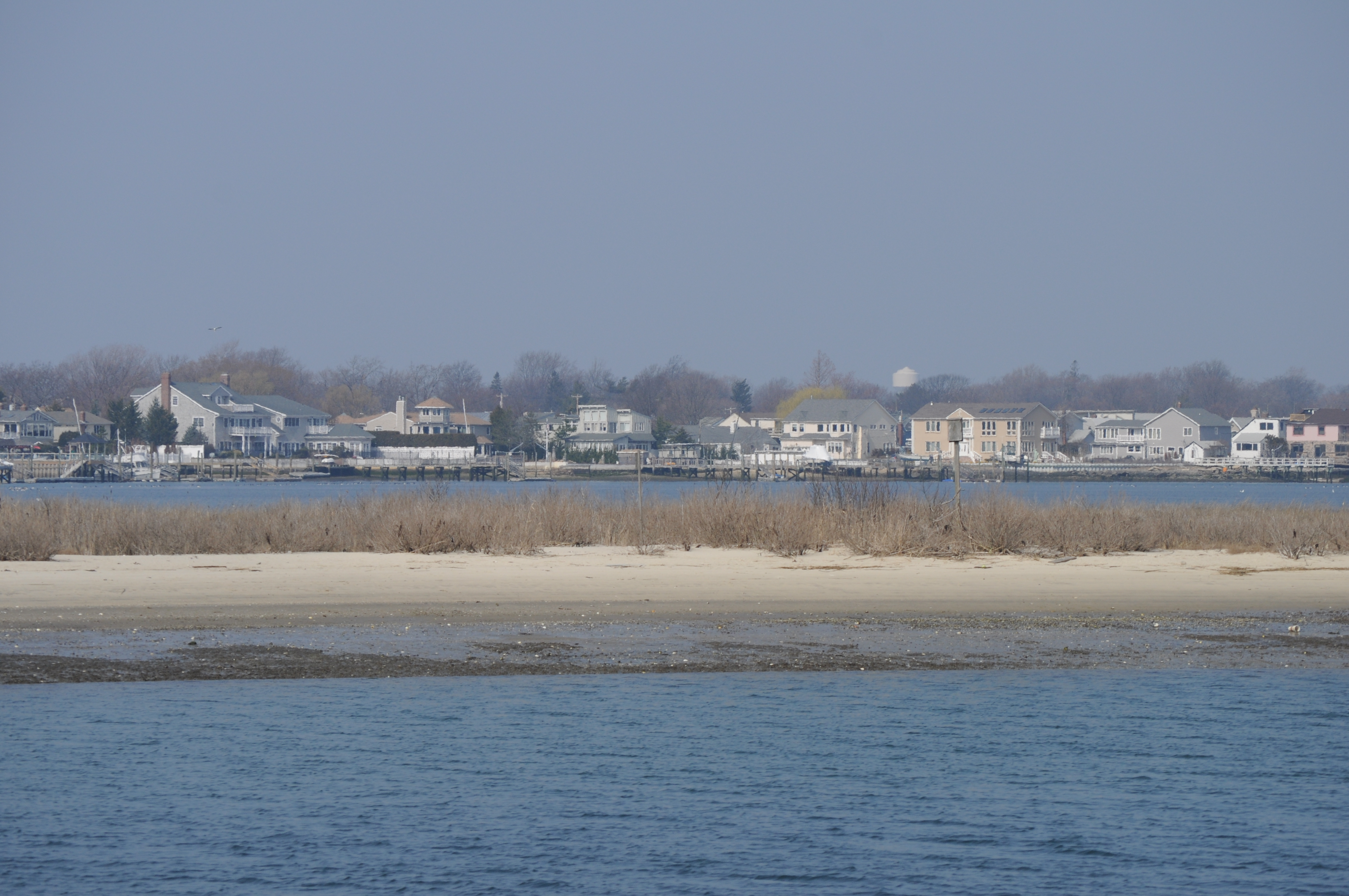
- Homes in Baldwin Harbor, seen from Waterfront Park in Freeport

- Location in Nassau County and the state of New York

- Location on Long Island Location within the state of New York
- Coordinates: 40°38′2″N 73°36′14″W
- Country: United States
- State: New York
- County: Nassau
- Town: Hempstead

Area
  - Total: 1.7 sq mi (4.4 km^{2})
  - Land: 1.2 sq mi (3.2 km^{2})
  - Water: 0.46 sq mi (1.2 km^{2})
- Elevation: 9.8 ft (3 m)

Population (2010)
  - Total: 8,102
  - Density: 6,600/sq mi (2,500/km^{2})
- Time zone: UTC-5 (Eastern (EST))
  - Summer (DST): UTC-4 (EDT)
- ZIP code: 11510
- Area codes: 516, 363
- FIPS code: 36-04154
- GNIS feature ID: 0942898

Baldwin Harbor is a hamlet and former census-designated place (CDP) in the Town of Hempstead, in Nassau County, on Long Island, in New York, United States. It was created concomitant with the 1990 United States census from the southernmost portions of the neighboring hamlet of Baldwin. It had a population of 8,102 at the time of the 2010 census.

== History ==
The CDP was created by the United States Census Bureau at the time of the 1990 United States census.

The Baldwin Harbor CDP was merged back into the Baldwin CDP concomitant with the 2020 United States Census.

== Geography ==
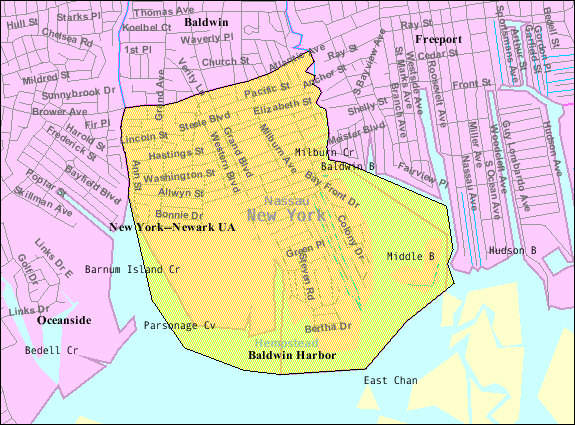
U.S. Census map of Baldwin Harbor

According to the United States Census Bureau, the CDP has a total area of 1.7 square miles (4.4 km^{2}), of which 1.2 square miles (3.1 km^{2}) is land and 0.5 square miles (1.3 km^{2}) (28.24%) is water.

Baldwin Harbor is located within the Milburn Creek–Middle Bay drainage area, and is located within the larger Long Island Sound/Atlantic Ocean Watershed.

According to the United States Environmental Protection Agency and the United States Geological Survey, the highest point in Baldwin Harbor is approximately 20 feet (6.1 m), and the lowest points are located at the bays, which are at sea level.

== Demographics ==
As of the census of 2010, there were 8,102 people, 2,687 households, and 2,185 families residing in the CDP. The population density was 6,751.6 inhabitants per square mile (2,606.8/km^{2}). There were 2,782 housing units at an average density of 2,318../sq mi (897.4/km^{2}). The racial makeup of the CDP was 61.25% White, 26.57% African American, 0.13% Native American, 4.87% Asian, 3.78% from other races, and 3.36% from two or more races. Hispanic or Latino of any race were 11.83% of the population.

There were 2,687 households, out of which 35.7% had children under the age of 18 living with them, 63.9% were married couples living together, 12.7% had a female householder with no husband present, and 18.7% were non-families. 14.7% of all households were made up of individuals, and 14.6% had someone living alone who was 65 years of age or older. The average household size was 3.01 and the average family size was 3.33.

In the CDP, the population was spread out, with 23.4% under the age of 18, 7.8% from 18 to 24, 22.8% from 25 to 44, 32.3% from 45 to 64, and 13.7% who were 65 years of age or older. The median age was 42.5 years. For every 100 females, there were 93.1 males. For every 100 females age 18 and over, there were 90.2 males.

The median income for a household in the CDP was $113,950, and the median income for a family was $120,344. Males had a median income of $59,855 versus $56,394 for females. The per capita income for the CDP was $33,543. About 1.6% of families and 7.1% of the population were below the poverty line, including 2.4% of those under age 18 and 3.9% of those age 65 or over.

== Parks and recreation ==
- Baldwin Park – A park operated by the Town of Hempstead.

== Education ==
=== School district ===
Baldwin Harbor is located entirely within the boundaries of (and is thus served by) the Baldwin Union Free School District. As such, all children who reside within the hamlet and attend public schools go to Baldwin's schools.

=== Library district ===
Baldwin Harbor is located within the boundaries of the Baldwin Library District.

== Notable people ==
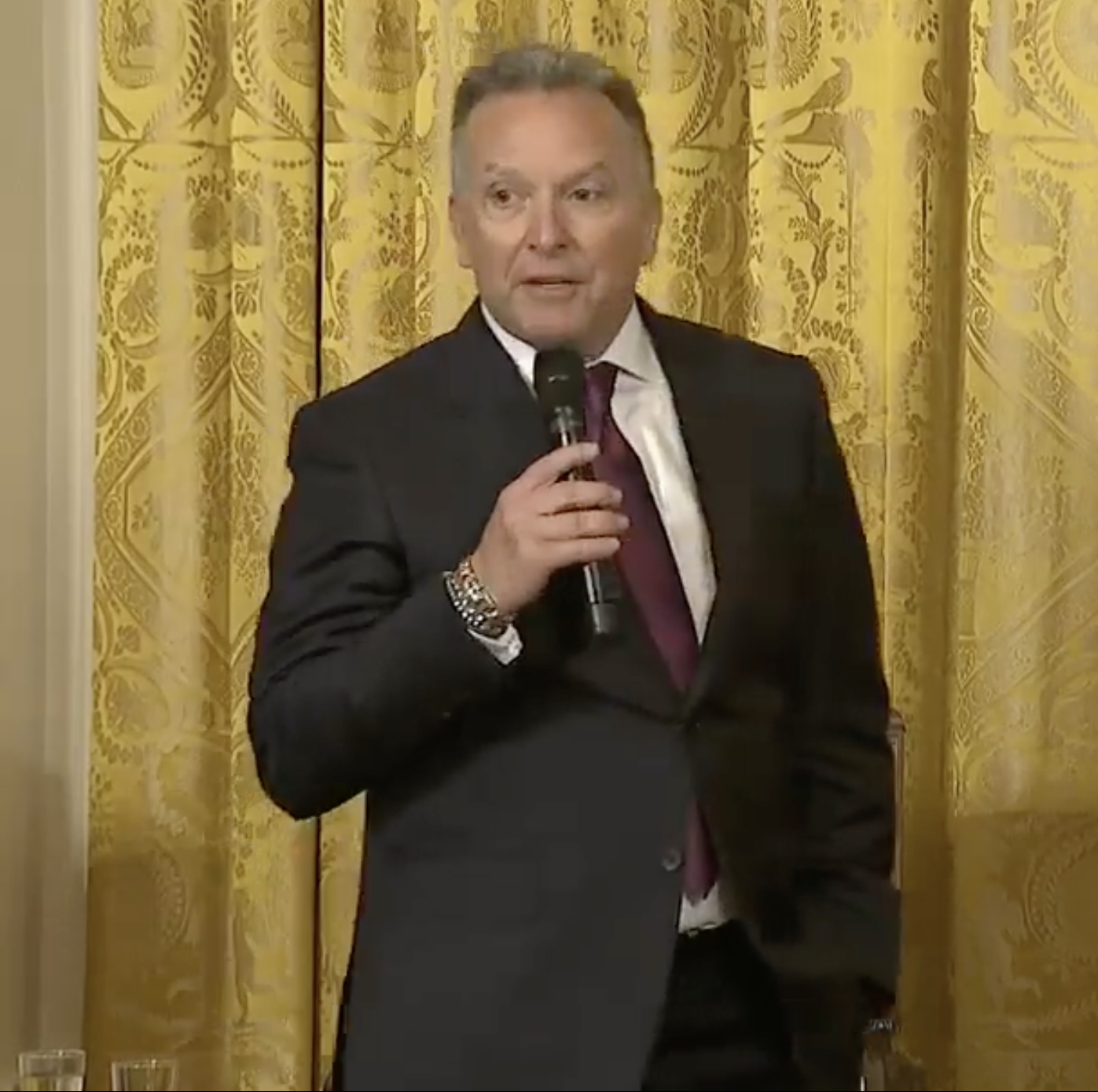
Steve Witkoff

- Jeff Gewirtz, basketball executive
- Louis Lomax (1922–1970), journalist and author
- Nathan Schiff, filmmaker
- Bernard Waber (1921–2013), children's author
- Steve Witkoff (born 1957), Special Envoy to the Middle East for U.S. President Donald Trump; real estate investor and developer, founder of the Witkoff Group, attorney

== See also ==
- Locust Grove – Another hamlet and former CDP in Nassau County.
