= Jeff Gewirtz =

National Basketball Association executive

Brooklyn Nets
- Position: CLO/EVP
- League: NBA

Personal information
- Born: Baldwin Harbor, New York

Career information
- College: Tufts University / Brooklyn Law School

Jeff Gewirtz is an American basketball executive. He holds the position of Executive Vice President for Business Affairs and serves as the Chief Legal Officer at BSE Global (BSE), a role he previously held from 2010 through 2020. In 2021, he assumed the role of BSE's Chief Operating Officer, overseeing the reopening of Barclays Center in response to the challenges posed by the COVID-19 pandemic. In this capacity, he implemented health and safety protocols and exercised general oversight over arena operations. Gewirtz initially joined BSE in May 2007, taking on the role of Senior Vice President and General Counsel.

== Early life ==
Gewirtz, originally from Baldwin Harbor, New York, is an alum of Tufts University. During his time at Tufts, he was a four-year member and Captain of the Tufts Varsity Tennis Team in his senior year, and he also contributed to its New England Championship team. Gewirtz also earned his Juris Doctor degree from Brooklyn Law School.

== Career ==
Gewirtz played a pivotal role in negotiating BSE's major commercial endeavors in recent years. These include significant initiatives such as the 2012 relocation of the New Jersey Nets to Brooklyn, the development of the $1 billion Barclays Center, the 2015 relocation of the New York Islanders to Barclays Center, and overseeing all legal affairs for the Islanders’ business operations until 2019. Additionally, he was involved in key transactions, including the ownership transfers of the Nets and Barclays Center in 2010, 2016, 2018, and 2019. Other notable contributions include the formation of the media rights alliance between the Brooklyn Nets and the YES Network, the lease acquisition and redevelopment of Nassau Veterans Memorial Coliseum, the establishment of the state-of-the-art practice facility for the Brooklyn Nets, the HSS Training Center, and the acquisition of the Webster Hall business.

== Personal life ==
Currently residing in Fayetteville, New York, he shares his home with his wife, Brooke Raphael. Gewirtz joined the Board of Directors of Access Justice Brooklyn in 2017.

== See also ==
- List of National Basketball Association team presidents
