= Chris Wallace (basketball) =

American basketball executive and scout

Personal information
- Born: Buckhannon, West Virginia, U.S.

Career information
- High school: Buckhannon-Upshur
- College: University of Kansas

Chris Wallace is an American professional basketball executive and scout who is the director of scouting for the Houston Rockets of the National Basketball Association (NBA).

Wallace began working in the NBA in 1986, and was the general manager of the Boston Celtics for ten seasons. Unlike many of his general manager peers, he has never been a player or coach in the NBA. In 2007, he joined the Memphis Grizzlies as their general manager and vice president of basketball operations.

== Early years ==
Wallace graduated from Buckhannon-Upshur High School in 1976. In 1981, while a student at the University of Kansas, Wallace founded Blue Ribbon College Basketball Yearbook, an in-depth preseason guide, which he edited and published until 1996. His work on the publication helped him build a reputation as an expert in the field.

== Professional career ==
Jon Spoelstra gave Wallace his first NBA job in 1986 as a scout for the Portland Trail Blazers. Wallace was Director of Player Personnel for the Miami Heat before coming to Boston. The Heat won a franchise-record 61 games in 1996–97, and Wallace was credited with discovering many of the Heat's players. His responsibilities included college and international scouting and searching for potential talent in the Continental Basketball Association as well as the NBA. Wallace was promoted to that position after four years as a scout for the Heat.

Before joining the Heat, Wallace worked in various scouting capacities for the Trail Blazers, Denver Nuggets, Los Angeles Clippers, and New York Knicks. He also worked as a draft consultant for the United States Basketball League.

=== Boston Celtics ===
Wallace was named general manager of the Boston Celtics in 1997, which placed him second in basketball operations behind team president and head coach Rick Pitino. The Celtics and Heat swapped second-round draft picks to allow him to take the new job. According to Pitino, the Celtics acquired Kenny Anderson, Tony Battie, and Vitaly Potapenko at Wallace's recommendation.

Wallace became the team's head of basketball operations when Pitino resigned on January 8, 2001. At the end of the season, Wallace and interim head coach Jim O'Brien were given multiyear extensions.

In 2001, Wallace made a trade-deadline trade with the Phoenix Suns of top-10 draft pick Joe Johnson for Tony Delk and Rodney Rogers (among others), which would help get the Celtics to their first Eastern Conference finals in over a decade, but became problematic over the long term when Johnson became a major star with Phoenix and Atlanta, while Rogers left the Celtics after Wallace failed to sign him to a contract extension. He also traded for Vin Baker, who had been signed to a large contract and tied up Boston's salary cap for three years while battling alcoholism. On May 9, 2003, Danny Ainge was hired as the executive director of Basketball Operations for the Celtics. Wallace remained with the team, but Ainge had complete control over basketball matters.

=== Memphis Grizzlies ===
Chris Wallace was hired to replace outgoing president Jerry West for the 2007–08 season. Wallace stated in an initial press conference that his goal was to one day win a championship with the team and head coach Marc Iavaroni. He was brought to work in Memphis just days before the 2007 draft, where the Grizzlies chose point guard Mike Conley Jr. with the fourth pick. Iavaroni lasted for just over a year as coach before being fired.

Wallace was heavily criticized in NBA circles for trading away the Grizzlies' 27-year-old franchise player, Pau Gasol, to the Los Angeles Lakers on February 1, 2008. In exchange, the Grizzlies received Kwame Brown, Javaris Critterton, a rookie second-round pick who had not yet played in the NBA (Marc Gasol) and a pair of very low future first-round picks (Lakers' 2008 and 2010). Many fans and sports commentators believed that the Grizzlies did not receive enough talent in return for Gasol and that the deal was a salary dump. The move also puzzled some rivals. San Antonio Spurs head coach Gregg Popovich was quoted by Sports Illustrated as saying "What they did in Memphis is beyond comprehension. There should be a trade committee that can scratch all trades that make no sense. I just wish I had been on a trade committee that oversees NBA trades. I would have voted no to the LA trade."

Despite the initial negative consensus regarding the Gasol trade, Wallace eventually won praise for his work rebuilding the Grizzlies' roster and making the Grizzlies contenders in the West. In 2013, Marc Gasol was named the NBA Defensive Player of the Year.

Wallace's role with Memphis diminished after team ownership transferred from Michael Heisley to Robert Pera. In 2012, John Hollinger became Memphis' vice president of basketball operations, with Wallace remaining as general manager. During his final season as GM he made his last move by trading Marc Gasol to the Toronto Raptors in exchange for Jonas Valanciunas, Delon Wright, C.J Miles and a 2024 second round pick - which resulted in Gasol winning his first NBA championship while Memphis missed the playoffs. On April 11, 2019, Wallace was demoted from his position as general manager to scout in the Grizzlies' restructuring due to poor results during the 2018–19 season, with assistant general manager Zach Kleiman being his replacement.

== Personal life ==
A native of Buckhannon, West Virginia, Wallace and his wife Debby have one son named Truman.
