= Baldwin Park (Baldwin Harbor, New York) =

Park in New York, United States

- Interactive map of Baldwin Park
- Type: Public
- Location: Baldwin Harbor, New York, United States
- Coordinates: 40°37′34″N 73°36′28″W
- Area: 147 acres (59 ha)
- Opened: 1960s
- Owner: Town of Hempstead
- Operator: Town of Hempstead

Baldwin Park (also known as Baldwin Harbor Town Park) is a park located within Baldwin Harbor, in Nassau County, on Long Island, in New York, United States. It is owned and operated by the Town of Hempstead.

== Description ==
Baldwin Park was created in the early 1960s, and its creation was funded in part by then-Governor Nelson Rockefeller's land-acquisition fund. Robert Moses preferred funding for this park site over another one in nearby Point Lookout, and funding was ultimately provided.

The park was approved by the Town of Hempstead in 1961, and it was announced that New York would fund 75% of the park's property costs, and that it would be town-operated and maintained.

The park is roughly 147 acres (59 ha) in total size, and is built atop property formerly owned by Press Wireless. The park was created in part due to fears by local residents that homes would be built on the land.

In the 2010s, the Town of Hempstead planned to construct a nature path through the park as part of a $4.5 million stormwater mitigation project.

Amenities in the park include sports and recreational facilities (including a skate park), a spray pool, and a playground, amongst others.
