= John Rinehart =

American basketball team executive

Sacramento Kings
- Position: President of Business Operations
- League: NBA

John Rinehart (born 1970) has been the President of Business Operations for the Sacramento Kings and Golden 1 Center since July 2017.

== Early life and career ==
Rinehart attended Villanova University (1987–91), and earned a Bachelor of Science degree in Accounting.

Before his job with the Kings, Rinehart worked for the Anaheim Angels & Anaheim Ducks (1998–2000) as Director of Finance at Anaheim Sports, and was Manager of Financial Reporting for the San Francisco Giants (1996–98). Before entering the sports profession, Rinehart worked for PricewaterhouseCoopers (1991–96) in San Francisco.

== Sacramento Kings ==
Starting in the 2000-01 season, Rinehart became the chief executive officer.

During this time, Rinehart oversaw the financial accounting and business operations of the Sacramento Kings and Sleep Train Arena. Also, Rinehart was directly involved in the construction of the Kings' new arena. Additionally, Rinehart's duties included contract negotiation, legal issues, partnerships, arena services, player contract compliance, strategic planning, insurance and tax requirements. Arena services included the supervision of the retail sales, human resources, ticket services and box office operations. In his time with the Kings, Rinehart has negotiated agreements on building naming rights, ticketing agreements, debt financing, and cable/radio broadcast contracts such as the Comcast Sports Net deal.

In 2013, Rinehart negotiated the sale of the Kings between the former owner Maloof family and the group led by Vivek Ranadivé. Despite the new ownership, Ranadivé asked Rinehart to remain with the team as EVP of business operations and CFO.

In July 2017, Rinehart was promoted from CFO to president of business operations, following the resignation of president Chris Granger after four years with the team.

== See also ==
List of National Basketball Association team presidents
