= Jason Wexler =

American basketball executive

Memphis Grizzlies
- League: NBA

Career information
- College: University of Virginia (BS); Columbia University (JD)

Career history
- 2013–July 2014: Memphis Grizzlies (Chief Operating Officer)
- July 2014–April 2019: Memphis Grizzlies (President of Business Operations)
- April 2019–Present: Memphis Grizzlies (Team President)

Jason Wexler is an American basketball executive. He holds the position of team president of the Memphis Grizzlies since April 2019. Wexler is responsible for supervision of marketing communications, community investment, corporate partnerships, ticket sales, and arena operations. Previously, Wexler served as president of business operations beginning in July 2014. Before this, Wexler served in the capacity of Chief Operating Officer at the organization starting in 2013.

== Early career ==
Early in his career, Wexler founded Greenhat Partners LLC, a firm specializing in real estate development and investment. Prior to that, Wexler was a partner in the Memphis law firm of Hanover, Walsh, Jalenak and Blair, PLLC.

Before joining the Grizzlies, Wexler was the president of the Henry Turley Company. In that role, he oversaw the execution of city center development initiatives and managed the daily operations of the real estate firm.

== Memphis Grizzlies ==
With the promotion of Wexler to team president, he was set to guide them through a new era, shifting from the "Grit and Grind" era characterized by the departures of players like Marc Gasol and Mike Conley in 2019. The focus will now be on developing a younger core centered around talents such as Jaren Jackson Jr. and Ja Morant.

== Personal life ==
Wexler received a Bachelor of Science in Architecture from the University of Virginia and completed his education with a degree from Columbia Law School.

== See also ==
- List of NBA team presidents
