= Thad Sheely =

National Basketball Association executive

Atlanta Hawks
- Position: Chief Operating Officer
- League: NBA

Personal information
- Born: Youngstown, Ohio

Career information
- College: Columbia University & Stanford GSB

Thad Sheely is the chief operating officer of the Atlanta Hawks and State Farm Arena since 2015.

== Early life and career ==
Sheely was raised in Youngstown, Ohio. Sheely received an MBA from Stanford University Graduate School of Business, and B.A. in urban studies from Columbia University.

Sheely started his career as an investment banker with Prudential Securities' sports facility finance group.

Prior to joining the Hawks, Sheely has worked in the sports/real estate industry for over 20 years, including his involvement in the development of Hudson Yards as SVP of operations for The Related Companies, MetLife Stadium for the New York Jets and New York Giants, and American Airlines Arena for the Miami Heat.

In 2010, Sheely was a recipient of SportsBusiness Journal's "40 Under 40" Award for his role in the MetLife stadium project. At this time, Sheely resided in Montclair, New Jersey, with his wife, Gabby, and their two sons, Ben and Nick.

Sheely has served as an adjunct professor at NYU's Tisch School of Sports/Hospitality/Management, lecturing on sports facility finance.

Sheely is on the board of trustees at The Paideia School.

== Atlanta Hawks ==
Sheely was the lead decision maker for the design/construction of the Hawk's new practice facility (Emory Sports Medicine Complex in Brookhaven), and the $200M remodel of State Farm Arena (formerly Philips Arena).

Under the direction of Sheely, the Atlanta Hawks made a historic agreement to refinance its $35 million construction loan for Emory Sports Medicine Complex with syndicate Black-owned banks to help bridge the racial equity gap.

== See also ==
- List of National Basketball Association team presidents
