= Brandon Schneider (executive) =

National Basketball Association executive

Golden State Warriors
- Positions: CEO & President of business operations
- League: NBA

Personal information
- Born: San Francisco Bay Area

Career information
- College: University of California, Los Angeles (BA)

Career history
- 2002–2004: Golden State Warriors (Account executive, season ticket sales)
- 2004–2005: Golden State Warriors (Ticket sales manager)
- 2014–2021: Golden State Warriors (Assistant director of ticket operations)
- 2007–2011: Golden State Warriors (Director of ticket sales)
- 2012–2018: Golden State Warriors (VP of ticket sales and service)
- 2019–2021: Golden State Warriors (Chief revenue officer)
- 2022–present: Golden State Warriors (President and Chief operating officer)

Brandon Schneider is an American sports executive who holds the position of chief operating officer and president of business operations of the Golden State Warriors, supervising all business operations for the organization, including the management of Chase Center.

== Career ==
Schneider replaced Rick Welts as chief operating officer and president of business operations in April 2021. Before assuming his current position as COO, Schneider served as the chief revenue officer for three seasons, four seasons as senior vice president of business development, two seasons as group vice president of ticket sales and services, and three seasons as vice president of ticket sales and services. Schneider initially became a part of the Warriors organization in the summer of 2002 as a season ticket account executive. He then advanced to the role of ticket sales manager in June 2004, and subsequently became the assistant director of ticket sales in April of the following year. Schneider began his career as a waiter.

== Personal life ==
Schneider, originally from the San Francisco Bay Area, completed his studies at UCLA in 2001, earning a degree in business economics with a minor in accounting. Schneider lives in Hillsborough, California with his wife Amanda and their son. Schneider has three younger brothers. He is a part-owner of the Los Angeles FC.

== See also ==
- List of National Basketball Association team presidents
