= Ethan Casson =

American basketball executive

Dallas Mavericks
- Position: President
- League: NBA

Career information
- High school: Keene High School
- College: Colby–Sawyer College

Ethan Casson is an American sports executive who serves as the president of the Dallas Mavericks of the National Basketball Association (NBA). He previously spent nine years as the chief executive officer of the Minnesota Timberwolves, Minnesota Lynx, and Iowa Wolves, and served as the Timberwolves' alternate governor on the NBA Board of Governors. In his current role as president of the Dallas Mavericks, Casson oversees the organization’s day-to-day business operations and long-term strategic vision. Over his career, Casson has held senior leadership roles in both the NBA and NFL and has been recognized for his contributions to sports business, venue development, and community engagement.

== Career ==
Dallas Mavericks

Casson was appointed President of the Dallas Mavericks in August 2025, assuming responsibility for the organization’s day-to-day business operations and long-term strategic vision.

Minnesota Timberwolves and Lynx

From 2016 to 2025, Casson served as CEO of the Minnesota Timberwolves and Minnesota Lynx, as well as the G League’s Iowa Wolves. During his tenure, the organization achieved record growth across key business categories, including season tickets, attendance, corporate partnerships, television viewership, merchandise sales, and digital engagement. The Timberwolves were named a finalist for the 2024 Sports Team of the Year by Sports Business Journal.

Casson also oversaw the $150 million renovation of Target Center, a project that modernized the arena and contributed to its recognition as a finalist for Sports Business Journal’s 2018 Facility of the Year and as one of Finance & Commerce’s Top Projects of 2017.

Community and Civic Initiatives

Casson oversaw several major community and social impact efforts during his time in Minnesota. He worked with the National Basketball Social Justice Coalition and the Restore the Vote Coalition to support legislative changes restoring voting rights to approximately 50,000 Minnesotans previously incarcerated or on parole. The organization received the 2023–24 NBA Inclusion Leadership Award for its work in this area.

San Francisco 49ers

Prior to joining the Timberwolves, Casson served as Chief Operating Officer of the San Francisco 49ers. In that role, he played a significant part in the development of Levi’s Stadium, securing a 20-year, $220 million naming rights partnership with Levi Strauss & Co., one of the largest naming rights agreements in NFL history. He also contributed to hosting major events, including Super Bowl 50.

Levi’s Stadium received widespread industry recognition following its opening. The venue became the first NFL stadium to achieve two LEED Gold certifications and earned several awards, including Sports Business Journal’s 2015 Facility of the Year and the Green Sports Alliance Environmental Innovators of the Year award in 2016.

Awards and Recognition

Casson has been recognized throughout his career for leadership in sports business, diversity, and organizational impact. His honors include:

- Sports Business Journal “ALL IN: Leaders in Diversity, Equity and Inclusion” (2023)
- Minneapolis/St. Paul Business Journal Most Admired CEO (2022)
- Sports Business Journal “People Who Influenced Sports Business” (2020)
- Sports Business Journal Forty Under 40 (Class of 2014)

== Education ==
Casson earned a Bachelor of Science in Sports Management from Colby-Sawyer College. He was inducted into the New England Basketball Hall of Fame in 2013 and the Colby-Sawyer College Athletic Hall of Fame in 2015.

== Personal life ==
Casson resides in Dallas with his wife, Lisa, and their sons, Lucas and Miles.

== See also ==
- List of National Basketball Association team presidents
