= Nathan Schiff =

American film director

Nathan Schiff is a Long Island, New York filmmaker best known for low-budget horror features he shot in Super 8mm while in his teens. Image Entertainment, a leading DVD distributor, held these films in such high regard that they restored and released the films on DVD releases in 2004.

Born in Forest Hills, New York, Schiff grew up in Baldwin Harbor, Long Island where he began making films at the age of 11. Between the ages of 11 and 16, he made over 20 short films. At age 16, he began filming his first feature, Weasels Rip My Flesh (1979), made on a $400 budget. The storyline follows a detective (John Smihula) investigating deaths caused by a giant mutated weasel. The weasel is captured by a mad scientist (Fred Borges) who plans to conquer the Earth with a monster army created by using the creature's regenerative blood (actually a mix of Karo syrup, cranberry sauce and ketchup).

In Long Island Cannibal Massacre (1980), power lawnmowers and chainsaws spew guts and gore across the suburban landscape as cannibal lepers lurk. They Don't Cut the Grass Anymore (1985) follows two psycho hillbilly gardeners who slice up yuppies instead of cutting the grass. When these three films were released on DVD, film director Wes Craven commented, "Schiff knows Long Island the way Dante knew Hell".

Schiff's fourth feature, Vermilion Eyes (1991), was not made available on DVD. The plot concerns the odyssey of a self-destructive man (John Smihula) through a dreamscape of prophetic nightmares where the border between fantasy and reality has blurred. Critic Ray Young reviewed, "Unique and personal, it grieves over the loss of innocence, as if tapped directly from the id. Vermilion Eyes makes no concessions to anyone or any genre and works out of bruised, frazzled emotion. The poetic, whirling, free style of its imagery is remarkably close in spirit to James Joyce".

Schiff later returned to filmmaking with the horror short Abracadaver! (2008), made for British producer David McGillivray. Promoted as "a gruesome tale of magic and mutilation," the film was part of McGillivray's Worst Fears series.

Long Island Cannibal Massacre and Weasels Rip My Flesh were selections of Cinefamily's 2008 Homemade Horror festival, and Schiff was flown to the West Coast as an invited guest of the Cinefamily film study group. The features were shown under the umbrella title The Super-8 Gorenography of Nathan Schiff! On November 29, 2008, Schiff introduced the two films from the stage of the Silent Movie Theatre in Los Angeles. LA Weekly reviewer Christoph Huber said:

"Whatever can be gleaned from the piecemeal plot about mutated monsters, a mad scientist and a macho detective would justify the even superior title Radioactive Weasels Rip My Flesh, but that's beside the point: In true amateur filmmaking spirit, this is foremost about the giddy joy clearly felt by its maker(s), ambitious (though some might say: foolish) enough to include a lengthy scene in outer space — on a $400 budget! But within the year, Schiff (who will introduce his double feature on November 29) had traded paper rockets for atmospheric chainsaw mayhem. Long Island Cannibal Massacre (1980) shows a Super-8 amateur-auteur coming into his threadbare own: It’s as gross and assured as any $900 production has the right to be. Schiff looks like Steven Spielberg next to the mysterious Chester Novell Turner, who before vanishing (forever?), bequeathed upon this Earth two hysterical video nasties that can barely be called competent but certainly stark-raving mad".

== Awards ==
In 2008, Abracadaver! won an award in the Best Horror Short category at the New York International Independent Film and Video Festival.
