= Memphis Grizzlies =

National Basketball Association team in Memphis, Tennessee

- 2026–27 Memphis Grizzlies season
- Conference: Western
- Division: Southwest
- Founded: 1995
- History: Vancouver Grizzlies; 1995–2001; Memphis Grizzlies; 2001–present
- Arena: FedExForum
- Location: Memphis, Tennessee
- Team colors: Beale Street blue, Memphis midnight blue, steel gray, gold
- Main sponsor: Robinhood
- President: Jason Wexler
- General manager: Zachary Kleiman
- Head coach: Tuomas Iisalo
- Ownership: Memphis Basketball, LLC (Robert Pera, Chairman and Controlling Owner)
- Affiliation: Memphis Hustle
- Championships: 0
- Conference titles: 0
- Division titles: 2 (2022, 2023)
- Retired numbers: 3 (9, 33, 50)
- Website: nba.com/grizzlies
| Association | Icon |

The Memphis Grizzlies (referred to locally as the Grizz) are an American professional basketball team based in Memphis, Tennessee. The Grizzlies compete in the National Basketball Association (NBA) as a member of the Southwest Division of the Western Conference. The Grizzlies play their home games at FedExForum. The Grizzlies are currently the only team in the major professional North American sports leagues based in the city of Memphis, one of 4 professional teams in the state of Tennessee, along with the Tennessee Titans of the National Football League, the Nashville Predators of the National Hockey League, and Nashville SC of Major League Soccer all of which play in Nashville, and the only professional basketball team in the state.

The team was originally established in Canada as the Vancouver Grizzlies in the city of Vancouver, British Columbia, an expansion team that joined the NBA for the 1995–96 season. After the 2000–01 season concluded, the Grizzlies left Vancouver and moved to Memphis.

== History ==
=== 1995–2001: Vancouver Grizzlies ===
The Vancouver Grizzlies were based in Vancouver, Canada, and were part of the NBA's Midwest Division in the Western Conference. The team was established in 1995, along with the Toronto Raptors, as part of the NBA's expansion into Canada. Original proposals were for the team to be called the Vancouver Mounties, but objections from the Royal Canadian Mounted Police forced the team to find a new name. The nickname, "Grizzlies" was eventually selected, named after the grizzly bear indigenous to British Columbia. The Grizzlies played their home games at General Motors (GM) Place for the entirety of their six seasons in Vancouver.

=== Move to Memphis ===
Memphis, Tennessee, had been host to the Memphis Sounds of the American Basketball Association (ABA) from 1970 to 1975.

On March 26, 2001, the Vancouver Grizzlies asked the NBA's permission to move to Memphis, and received it on July 3. The team moved after the 2000–01 season, leaving the Toronto Raptors as the only Canadian basketball team in the NBA and turning Memphis into the easternmost city in the NBA's Western Conference.

The team was renamed the Memphis Grizzlies. They explored renaming the team to better reflect the Memphis area, but found strong community supported for the existing name—primarily because a World Football League team by that name had played in the city in 1974 and 1975.

In their first three seasons in Memphis, the Grizzlies played their home games at the Pyramid Arena.

=== 2001–2007: The Pau Gasol era ===
In the 2001 NBA draft, the Atlanta Hawks chose Pau Gasol as the third overall pick, trading him to the Grizzlies. Forward Shane Battier was selected with the sixth pick in the same draft by the Vancouver Grizzlies. They also acquired Jason Williams from the Sacramento Kings in exchange for Mike Bibby that same year. After the Grizzlies' first season in Memphis, Gasol won the NBA Rookie of the Year Award. However, despite the strong draft class, general manager Billy Knight was let go. After Knight's departure and the season, the team hired former Los Angeles Laker and Hall of Famer Jerry West as general manager in 2002, who later received the 2003–04 NBA Executive of the Year Award. After West's arrival the team was changed a great deal from Knight's team, with the removal of Sidney Lowe as head coach after 0–8 start to the season and a great deal of player movement, with players such as Mike Miller and James Posey becoming vital to the team's success. During the 2002–03 season, Hubie Brown was hired to coach the Grizzlies.

Before the team could improve, though, one final mistake from the Vancouver era happened to bite them. Their first round pick in the 2003 NBA draft, in which they could have had their choice of future All-Stars Carmelo Anthony, Chris Bosh, or Dwyane Wade, had been traded to the Detroit Pistons in 1997 for Otis Thorpe. Due to the structure of the lottery, the Grizzlies ended up losing the second overall pick, one which likely could have changed their future course by selecting any of the aforementioned players, for a player who didn't even play a full season for the team, playing only 47 games for the team before being released. Even considering the Pistons themselves used the pick on Darko Miličić, widely considered one of that year's biggest draft busts, the Grizzlies had indirectly performed one of the most lopsided trades in NBA history.

Brown won the NBA Coach of the Year Award during the next season when the Grizzlies made the NBA playoffs for the first time in team history in 2004 as the sixth seed in the Western Conference in a drastic change from being perennially one of the worst teams in the NBA. They also won a then-record 50 games under Gasol and Williams. In the playoffs, they faced the San Antonio Spurs, who swept them out of the playoffs in four games.

==== 2004–2007 ====
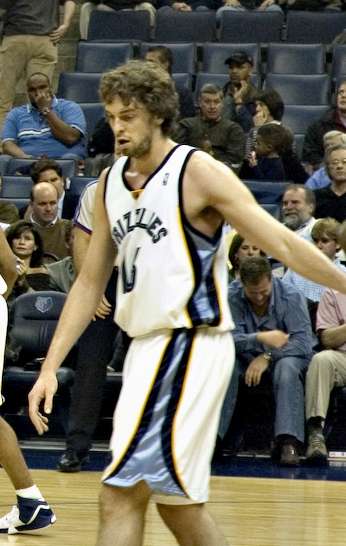
Pau Gasol

Brown stepped down as head coach during the 2004–05 season. At the time of his resignation, the Grizzlies had a losing record but West hired TNT analyst and former coach Mike Fratello to replace Brown. The Grizzlies' record improved and the team advanced to the post-season for the second consecutive season. However, the Grizzlies were swept out in the first round again, this time by the Phoenix Suns. After the season, which ended with anger between Fratello and many of the players, namely Bonzi Wells and Jason Williams, the team had an active 2005 off-season in which they revamped the team and added veterans. While the Grizzlies lost Wells, Williams, Stromile Swift, and James Posey, they acquired Damon Stoudamire, Bobby Jackson, Hakim Warrick, and Eddie Jones. They made the playoffs for the third consecutive year as well.

With their record they had the fifth seed in the Western Conference playoffs and would face the Dallas Mavericks, who swept the Grizzlies in four games. After the 2006 NBA draft, Jerry West traded Shane Battier to the Houston Rockets for their first-round pick Rudy Gay and Stromile Swift. Before the 2006–07 season, they suffered a blow when Gasol broke his left foot while playing for Spain in the World Championships. The Grizzlies started the season 5–17 without Gasol, and then went 1–7 while he was limited to about 25 minutes per game. At that point, Fratello was fired and replaced by Tony Barone Sr. as interim coach. Barone was the team's player personnel director and had never coached an NBA game though he had coached at the collegiate level for both Creighton and Texas A&M being named coach of the year in their conferences three times during his tenure.

=== 2007–2010: Rebuilding ===
The Grizzlies finished the 2006–07 season with a league-worst 22–60 record, and Jerry West announced his resignation from his position as the team's general manager shortly after the end of the regular season. The team also hired Marc Iavaroni, who was previously with the Phoenix Suns as an assistant coach, to be the team's new head coach. Despite the last-place finish, the Grizzlies, who held the best chance of landing the first pick, ended up with the fourth pick in the 2007 NBA draft, with which the Grizzlies selected Mike Conley Jr.

On June 18, 2007, the Grizzlies named former Boston Celtics general manager Chris Wallace as the team's general manager and vice president of basketball operations, replacing the retired West. A few days later, they hired former Philadelphia 76ers and Orlando Magic head coach Johnny Davis, longtime NBA assistant coach Gordon Chiesa, and the head coach of the 2007 NBA Development League champion Dakota Wizards, David Joerger, as the team's new assistant coaches. Gene Bartow was named the Grizzlies' president of basketball operations on August 16, 2007. On February 1, 2008, Pau Gasol was traded to the Los Angeles Lakers for Kwame Brown, Javaris Crittenton, Aaron McKie, rights to Marc Gasol (Pau's younger brother), and 2008 and 2010 first-round draft picks.

On January 22, 2009, head coach Marc Iavaroni was fired and replaced on an interim basis by assistant coach Johnny Davis for two games. Lionel Hollins was named the Grizzlies' permanent head coach on January 25, 2009.

On June 25, 2009, with the second overall pick in the NBA draft, Memphis selected Hasheem Thabeet, then selected DeMarre Carroll with the 27th overall pick. On September 9, 2009, the Grizzlies signed free agent Allen Iverson to a one-year, $3.5 million deal. He played just three games (none in Memphis) before he departing for "personal problems". He was then waived by the Grizzlies, who improved after he left. With new acquisition Zach Randolph playing at an All-Star level, Marc Gasol's improvement, and a commitment to defense, the Grizzlies were in playoff contention for much of the 2009–10 season, before finishing 10th in the Western Conference with a win–loss record of 40–42.

=== 2010–2019: The "Grit and Grind" era ===
==== 2010–2017: Marc Gasol, Zach Randolph, Mike Conley and Tony Allen era ====
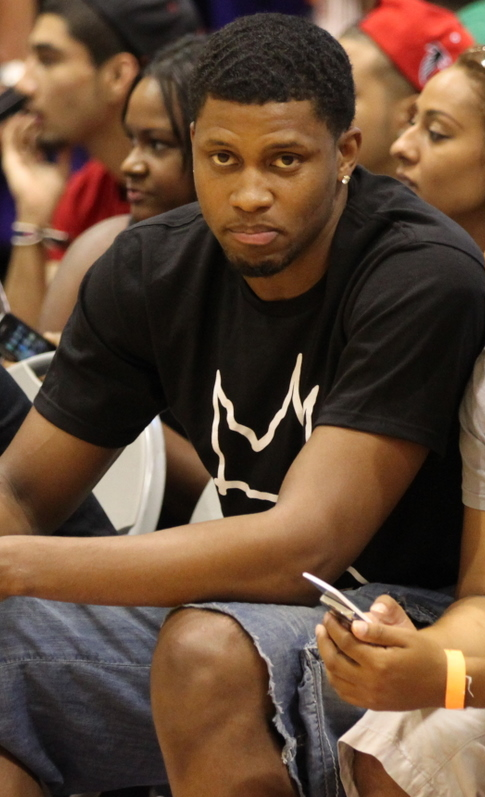
Rudy Gay played for the Grizzlies from 2006 to 2013.

Going into the 2010–11 season the Grizzlies celebrated the tenth year of basketball in Memphis. The season started with tremendous enthusiasm by the fan base in the Memphis area. Although the Grizzlies and their fans were celebrating the tenth season, the Grizzlies were also cheering for the eighth spot in the Western Conference playoffs. They finished with a 46–36 record. The Grizzlies found their way back into the post-season for the first time in five years in the 2010–11 season after a 101–96 home victory over the Sacramento Kings on April 8, 2011. While in the playoff hunt in February 2011, the Grizzlies traded Hasheem Thabeet, DeMarre Carroll, and a protected future first-round pick to the Houston Rockets for Shane Battier, and Ishmael Smith.

The team became known locally and nationally for its "Grit and Grind"-style of basketball which means disruptive defense through high pressure on the ball (they were the team with the most steals per game in 2010–11) and their inside-out offense (they were the highest-scoring team in the paint also). The Grizzlies achieved several firsts in franchise history during the 2011 NBA playoffs. Entering the playoffs as an eighth seed, the team won their first playoff game in franchise history on April 17 with a 101–98 victory on the road against the top-seeded San Antonio Spurs. Memphis then won their first home playoff game when they beat the Spurs 91–88 on April 23. Finally, on April 29, the team won their first playoff series when they beat the Spurs in Game 6, 99–91 to win the series 4–2. This was only the fourth time in NBA history that an #8 seed defeated a #1 seed, and only the second time in a best-of-seven series (the first two were in a best-of-five series). The Grizzlies' historic season came to an end after the Oklahoma City Thunder defeated them in Game 7 of the Western Conference semifinals.

The team re-signed Marc Gasol and Hamed Haddadi after the 2010–11 season.

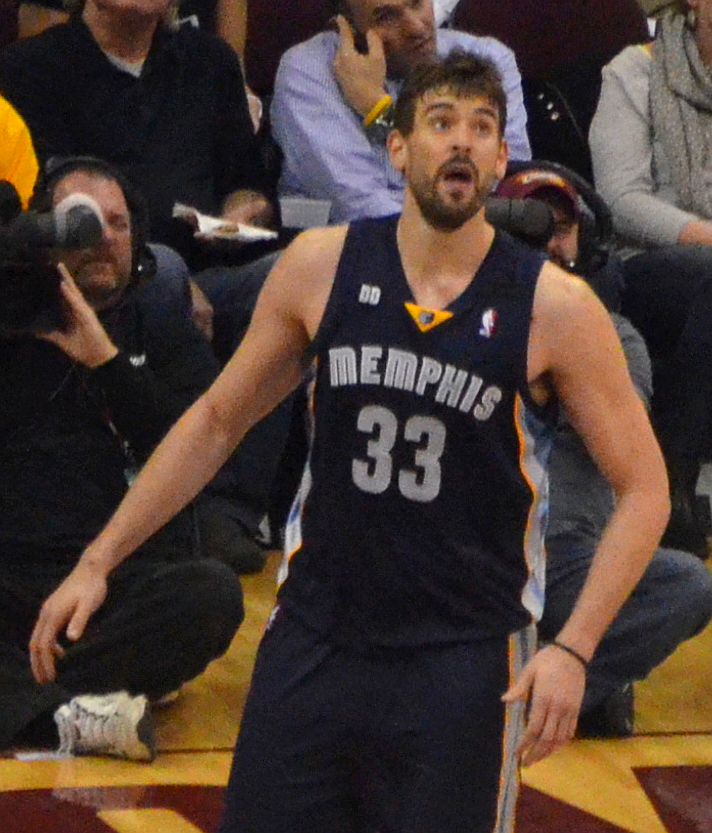
Marc Gasol

The Grizzlies found their way back into the post-season for the second time in six years in the 2011–12 season after a 103–91 home victory over the New Orleans Hornets on April 18, 2012. They finished the 2011–12 season with a 41–25 record, fourth in the Western Conference. However, they were eliminated in the first round by the Los Angeles Clippers in seven games.

During the 2012 off-season, the Grizzlies drafted Tony Wroten with the 25th overall pick. Their biggest signing in an effort to improve their bench was bringing in Jerryd Bayless. They also acquired Wayne Ellington from the Minnesota Timberwolves in exchange for Dante Cunningham.

On June 11, Michael Heisley reportedly had an agreement in principle to sell the Memphis Grizzlies to communications technology magnate Robert J. Pera, who at 34 had a spot on Forbes' 2012 list of the 10 youngest billionaires in the world. The purchase price was in the $350 million range. On August 23, Pera reached an agreement with a group of local partners including J.R. "Pitt" Hyde, Staley Cates, Ed Dobbs, Duncan Williams and Billy Orgel. On October 25, Robert Pera was officially approved as the owner of the Memphis Grizzlies. On November 4, Pera named Jason Levien the chief executive officer and managing partner of the Memphis Grizzlies. On December 13, 2012, ESPN announced that John Hollinger was hired by the Grizzlies as their new vice president of basketball operations.

On January 23, 2013, the Grizzlies acquired Jon Leuer from the Cleveland Cavaliers in exchange for Marreese Speights, Wayne Ellington, Josh Selby, and a future first-round pick. On January 30, the Grizzlies traded Rudy Gay and Hamed Haddadi to the Toronto Raptors in a three team deal also involving the Detroit Pistons. The Grizzlies acquired Tayshaun Prince and Austin Daye from the Pistons and Ed Davis and a future second-round pick from the Raptors.

At the end of the season, Memphis finished with their best franchise record of 56–26, second in the division and as the fifth seed in the playoffs. Also, Marc Gasol was named NBA Defensive Player of the Year. In the opening round, Memphis defeated the Los Angeles Clippers in six games after trailing in the series 0–2. This avenged their defeat from the previous year at the hands of the Clippers. Memphis then went on to the Western Conference Finals for the first time in franchise history when they defeated the Oklahoma City Thunder 4–1 in their semi-finals series. This was a rematch of their meeting in the 2011 playoffs, which the Thunder won in seven games. However, the Grizzlies' season ended in the Conference Finals as they were swept by the eventual conference champions, San Antonio Spurs in yet another rematch/reversal from the 2011 playoffs.

The Grizzlies struggled to begin the 2013–14 season, starting out at 14–18 with Marc Gasol out, and entered the All-Star break with a win–loss record of 29–23. They went 21–9 after, finishing in third place in the Southwest division and in seventh place in the Western Conference with a win–loss record of 50–32, including a 14-game winning streak at FedExForum. They faced the Oklahoma City Thunder in the playoffs and had a record four straight overtimes from games 2–5, going 3–1 in the overtimes. The Grizzlies fell 4–3, despite an effort by Gasol in Game 7 without Randolph after he was suspended for punching Thunder center Steven Adams in Game 6.

On October 29, 2014, the Grizzlies defeated the Minnesota Timberwolves 105–101 for the franchise's first victory in a season opener since 2000, the year before the team moved to Memphis.

In the 2014–15 season, the Grizzlies made the NBA playoffs as the fifth seed in the Western Conference. In the first round, the Grizzlies defeated the Portland Trail Blazers in five games. Games 4 and 5 were played without Mike Conley Jr., who in Game 3 suffered multiple facial fractures in a collision with Blazers guard CJ McCollum. In the second round, they found themselves facing off against the top-seeded Golden State Warriors and MVP Stephen Curry. The Warriors took Game 1, and Conley returned in Game 2 to lead the Grizzlies to a 108–95 victory. Memphis took a 2–1 series lead before Golden State ultimately dispatched the Grizzlies in six games.

On April 1, 2016, the Grizzlies signed their 28th player for the season, an NBA record. On July 6, 2017, the team's management announced that Randolph's number 50 jersey would be retired in the future after he became a free agent, and eventually signed with the Sacramento Kings. Tony Allen also left and signed with the New Orleans Pelicans, closing the door on the "Grit and Grind" era.

==== 2017–2019: End of an era ====
With the departures of Randolph and Allen, the 2017–18 Grizzlies missed the playoffs for the first time since the 2009–10 season, and tied their longest losing streak in franchise history near the end of the season with 19 straight losses from January 31 to March 17, 2018, while suffering from their worst loss in franchise history during the regular season on March 22, losing to the Charlotte Hornets 140–79, all with their point guard Mike Conley Jr. missing all but 12 games due to injuries. The Grizzlies tried to be competitive again with Conley and others back in the beginning of the 2018–19 season, but were on the outside looking in as the trade deadline approached and they were standing at the 14th seed with a 22–33 record by February 5. The Grizzlies decided to move on from their two franchise players and the last remnants of the "Grit and Grind" era with Marc Gasol getting traded to the Toronto Raptors in exchange for Jonas Valančiūnas, Delon Wright, C. J. Miles, and a 2024 second-round draft pick. After the season, on July 6, Mike Conley Jr. was traded to the Utah Jazz in exchange for Grayson Allen, Kyle Korver, Jae Crowder and the 23rd pick of the 2019 NBA draft.

=== 2019–2026: The Ja Morant era ===
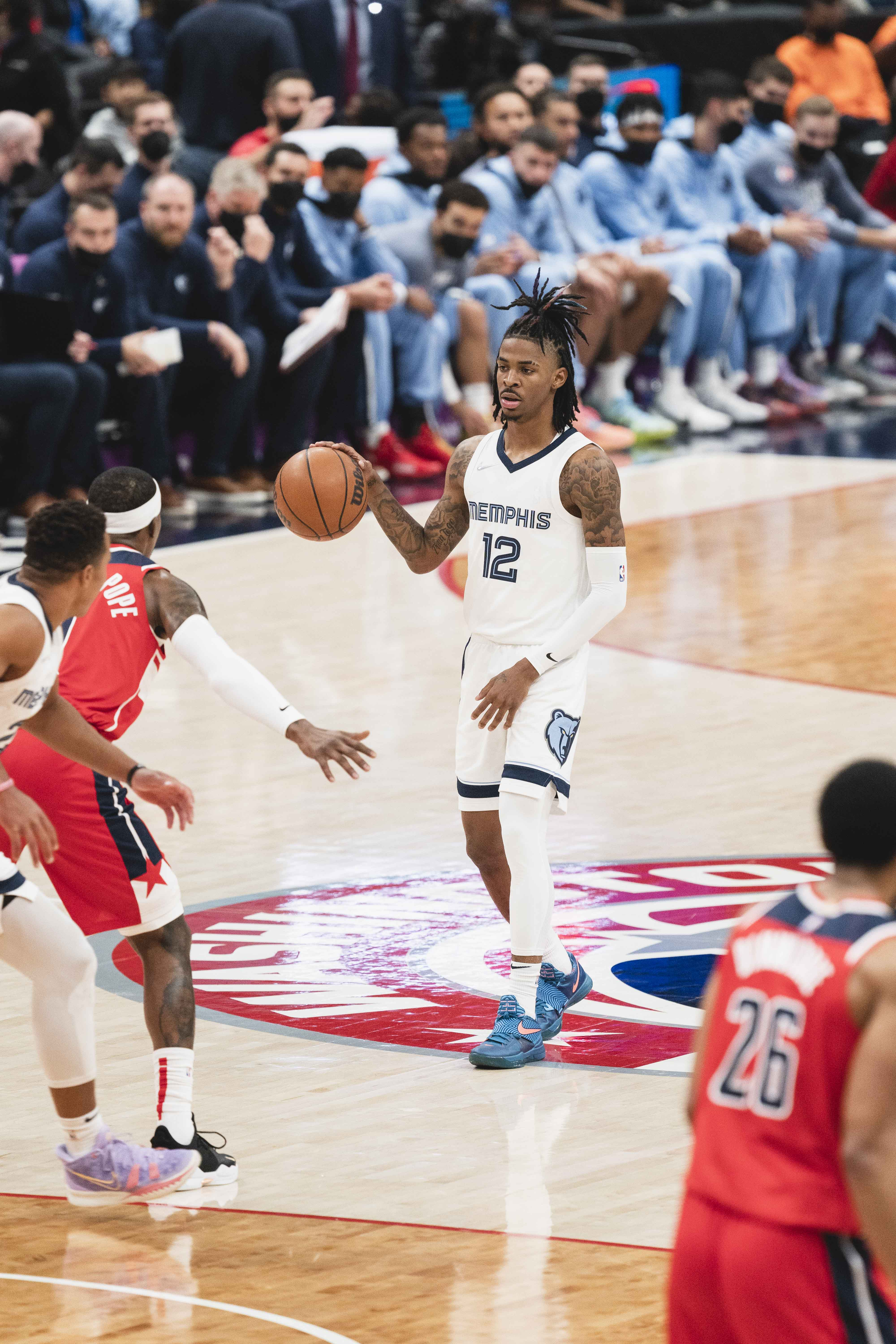
Ja Morant played for the team from 2019-26.

After the end of the 2018–19 season, controlling owner Robert Pera announced a restructuring of the Grizzlies' basketball operations department: "In order to put our team on the path to sustainable success, it was necessary to change our approach to basketball operations". J. B. Bickerstaff was relieved from his duties as head coach and general manager Chris Wallace was reallocated to a role exclusively in player scouting. Jason Wexler was announced as team president and Zachary Kleiman was promoted to general manager and EVP of basketball operations.

On June 12, 2019, the Grizzlies announced Taylor Jenkins as the team's new head coach.

With the second pick in the 2019 NBA draft, the Grizzlies selected Ja Morant. Additionally, they received Brandon Clarke after he was selected by the Oklahoma City Thunder with the 21st pick, and then immediately traded to the Grizzlies for the 23rd pick (via the Utah Jazz) and the Grizzlies' 2024 second-round pick. The Grizzlies rebuilt their roster with a young core consisting of Morant, Clarke, Allen, Dillon Brooks, and Jaren Jackson Jr.

After the suspension of the 2019–20 NBA season, the Grizzlies were one of the 22 teams invited to the NBA Bubble to participate in the final eight games of the regular season. They finished in ninth place in the Western Conference and had a chance to make it to the 2020 NBA playoffs, needing to win two games against the Portland Trail Blazers to advance. In the first and only play-in game, the Trail Blazers defeated the Grizzlies 126–122. At the conclusion of the season, Morant, who averaged 17.8 points and 7.3 assists per game, was named the NBA Rookie of the Year, earning 99 out of 100 first place votes on the ballot. Morant and teammate Brandon Clarke were also named to the 2019–20 NBA All-Rookie First Team.

The Grizzlies finished the COVID-shortened 2020–21 NBA season with a 38–34 record, earning them the ninth best record in the Western Conference and a chance to make the NBA playoffs through the play-in tournament by winning two games in a row. The Grizzlies did so with a 100–96 victory over the 10th-place San Antonio Spurs, at home on May 19, 2021 followed by a 117–112 victory over the 8th-place Golden State Warriors in San Francisco on May 21, 2021, to claim the Western Conference's 8th seed behind 35 points from Morant. The Grizzlies' first-round match-up pitted them against the Utah Jazz, who boasted the top record in the league. The Grizzlies upset the Jazz in Salt Lake City with a 112–109 victory in Game 1 but went on to lose the series in five games. Rookie wing Desmond Bane, acquired by Memphis with the 30th overall pick in the 2020 NBA draft, was selected to the 2020–21 NBA All-Rookie Second Team for his campaign that season.

The Grizzlies saw greater success in their 2021–22 season. By the All-Star break, the Grizzlies had recorded a record of 41–19, good for 3rd place in the West. On March 30, 2022, the Grizzlies defeated the San Antonio Spurs to clinch their first division title in franchise history and the Western Conference's second seed, their highest-ever. The Grizzlies finished the regular season with a record of 56–26. They would go on to defeat Minnesota in the first round before losing to the Golden State Warriors in the second round in 6 games.

The 2022–23 NBA season saw the Grizzlies finish 51–31, setting them up with the second seed in the West. Jaren Jackson Jr. was named an All Star for the first time and was also named the NBA Defensive Player of the Year during the season. After a season plagued by injuries and off the court issues, Memphis marched into the playoffs that saw them matched up against the Lakers. The Grizzlies would lose the first round series against the seventh seed Los Angeles Lakers (2–4).

In the off-season, the Grizzlies signed veteran and former MVP Derrick Rose and acquired Josh Christopher in a trade for Dillon Brooks. They started the 2023–24 NBA season off with zero wins and six losses, their worst start since the 2002–03 season. After being suspended for 25 games, Morant returned and hit the game winning buzzer beater in his first game back. After nine games back, Morant suffered a shoulder injury and was declared to miss the rest of the season. Additionally, Marcus Smart only appeared in 20 games this season, similar to how Derrick Rose only played in 24 games including 7 starts, as the Grizzlies wrapped up an injury riddled season with a record of 27–55, setting a record for the most players used in a season.

=== 2026–present: Post Morant era and rebuilding ===
In the 2026 off-season Ja Morant was traded to the Portland Trail Blazers for Jerami Grant and Kris Murray. On June 23, during the 2026 NBA draft, the Grizzlies selected Cameron Boozer with the third overall pick, and received the 21st pick from the Detroit Pistons which they used to select Karim López.

== Season-by-season record ==
List of the last five seasons completed by the Grizzlies. For the full season-by-season history, see list of Memphis Grizzlies seasons.

Note: GP = Games played, W = Wins, L = Losses, W–L% = Winning percentage

| Season | GP | W | L | W–L% | Finish | Playoffs |
| 2021–22 | 82 | 56 | 26 | .683 | 1st, Southwest | Lost in conference semifinals, 2–4 (Warriors) |
| 2022–23 | 82 | 51 | 31 | .622 | 1st, Southwest | Lost in first round, 2–4 (Lakers) |
| 2023–24 | 82 | 27 | 55 | .329 | 4th, Southwest | Did not qualify |
| 2024–25 | 82 | 48 | 34 | .585 | 2nd, Southwest | Lost in first round, 0–4 (Thunder) |
| 2025–26 | 82 | 25 | 57 | .305 | 5th, Southwest | Did not qualify |

== Home arenas ==
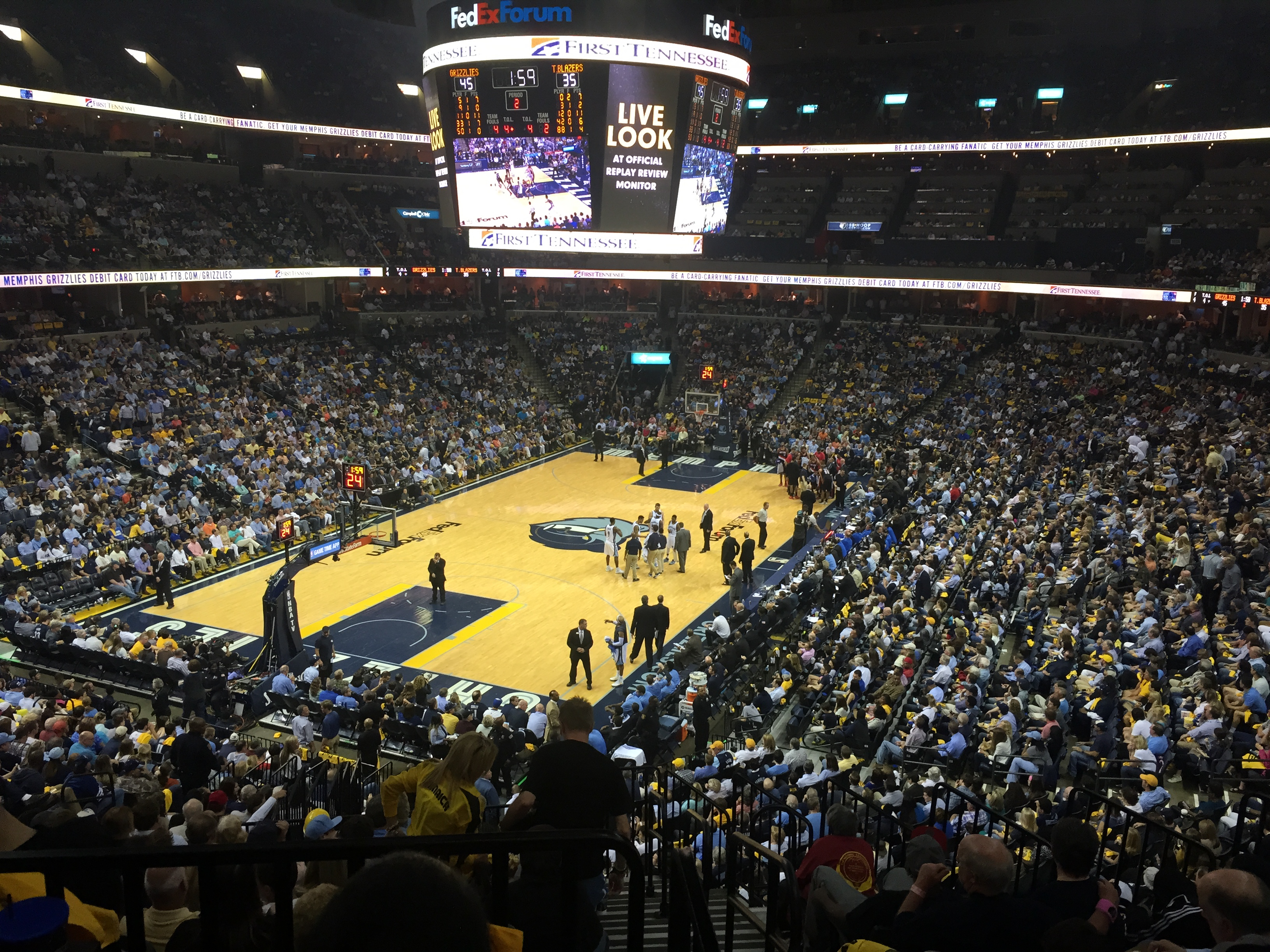
FedExForum

- General Motors (GM) Place (1995–2001)
- Pyramid Arena (2001–2004)
- FedExForum (2004–present)

== Uniforms ==
Upon their arrival in Memphis, the Grizzlies retained the same uniforms they wore in their final season in Vancouver, but with the city name emblazoned on both the white and black uniform. Turquoise and red served as the accent colors. After one season, the Grizzlies made a minor tweak, replacing the "G-bear" logo with the "howling bear" logo on the right leg. The "ball and claws" logo was also added above the player's name.

Coinciding with the move from the Pyramid to FedExForum in 2004, the Grizzlies released a new uniform design featuring navy blue, Beale Street blue, smoke blue, and gold. It also brought back the team name on the home uniform. The letters and numbers employed a distinct split-letter style reminiscent of the Toronto Blue Jays and Cleveland Cavaliers' 1990s uniforms. The logo also changed from a "howling bear" to a more stoic bear head. As a result of their logo change, the Grizzlies are currently one of nine NBA teams without a basketball on their logo, along with the Bulls, the Cavaliers, the Bucks, the Hawks, the Trail Blazers, the Warriors, the Rockets, and the Spurs.

In 2009, the Grizzlies released an alternate uniform with Beale Street blue as the base color. Unlike the primary uniforms, this design featured the city name and player's name arranged in a straight alignment; the primaries had a radially arched alignment.

When the Grizzlies switched to Adidas' Revolution 30 system in 2010, the numbers changed from a split-letter style to a bolder, single-color style, presumably due to the difficulty of producing such design. In 2017, the Grizzlies wore a black sleeved uniform as a tribute to Martin Luther King Jr.

After switching to Nike in 2017, the Grizzlies made minimal changes to their uniforms, with the exception of the Beale Street alternates now featuring the player's name below the number. The following season, the Grizzlies drastically changed their uniforms. The white "Association" and navy blue "Icon" uniform had player names below the number and straight alignment for the city name and team name respectively. Both uniforms featured three alternating lines on the beltline, which spelled "MEM", the primary logo on the left leg, and asymmetrical striping. On the Beale Street blue "Statement" uniform, player names were placed above the number, and the team name was arranged in a radial arch. The primary logo is on the beltline and on the left leg while the aforementioned alternating "MEM" lines surround the logo. In 2022, the "Statement" uniform was modified, featuring the full team name ("Memphis" in gold, "Grizzlies" in navy/smoke/navy split letters) in front, the primary logo on the right leg, and "MEM" lines on the striping and beltline.

As part of the Nike contract, the Grizzlies also wore a fourth uniform, the "City" uniform. The original "City" uniform had a white base and featured lettering based on the "I am a Man" protest banners from the Memphis sanitation strike of 1968. The 2018–19 "City" uniform, which featured a grey base and gold letters, paid tribute to professional wrestling in Memphis. The Grizzlies did not wear a "City" uniform for the 2019–20 season, opting for the throwback Vancouver Grizzlies uniforms instead. In the 2020–21 season, the Grizzlies returned to wearing "City" uniforms, this time with a black base, metallic gold lettering and turquoise trim as a tribute to Isaac Hayes and Stax Records. This uniform was recolored to the Grizzlies' current color scheme in a white base and was used as their "City" uniform in the 2025–26 season. In the 2021–22 season, the Grizzlies wore a commemorative "City" uniform featuring a mix of styles used by the team. The midnight-based uniform featured elements from the Vancouver era as well as the "Grit and Grind" and modern eras. Then for the 2022–23 "City" uniform, the Grizzlies wore black uniforms with Beale Street blue, chrome and gold accents in homage to the Memphis rap genre. The "City" uniform for the 2023–24 season, according to the team, "represents the pure simple joy of growing up playing basketball on local courts dreaming of representing your hometown team". The black-based uniform features the "MEM" lines in white with gold numbers. The "City" uniform used in the 2024–25 season celebrated the 50th anniversary of the rebranding of Memphis' former ABA team, the Memphis Sounds, using a red base, Beale Street blue and gold accents, and a throwback "Memphis" wordmark in homage to the Sounds' logo.

== Personnel ==
=== Current roster ===
Memphis Grizzlies roster
Players

| Pos. | No. | Player | Height | Weight | DOB | From |
|---|---|---|---|---|---|---|
| F | 27 | Cameron Boozer | 6 ft 8 in (2.03 m) | 250 lb (113 kg) | 2007-07-18 | Duke |
| G | 23 | Cedric Coward | 6 ft 6 in (1.98 m) | 206 lb (93 kg) | 2003-09-11 | Washington State |
| C | 14 | Zach Edey | 7 ft 4 in (2.24 m) | 305 lb (138 kg) | 2002-05-14 | Purdue |
| F | 3 | Jerami Grant | 6 ft 7 in (2.01 m) | 213 lb (97 kg) | 1994-03-12 | Syracuse |
| F | 22 | Taylor Hendricks | 6 ft 9 in (2.06 m) | 215 lb (98 kg) | 2003-11-22 | Central Florida |
| F | 45 | GG Jackson (injured) | 6 ft 9 in (2.06 m) | 210 lb (95 kg) | 2004-12-17 | South Carolina |
| G/F | 2 | Ty Jerome | 6 ft 5 in (1.96 m) | 195 lb (88 kg) | 1997-07-08 | Virginia |
| F | 35 | Karim López | 6 ft 8 in (2.03 m) | 210 lb (95 kg) | 2007-04-12 | Mexico |
| G | 21 | Jahmai Mashack (TW) | 6 ft 4 in (1.93 m) | 203 lb (92 kg) | 2002-11-10 | Tennessee |
| F | 17 | Kris Murray | 6 ft 8 in (2.03 m) | 218 lb (99 kg) | 2000-08-19 | Iowa |
| G | 1 | Scotty Pippen Jr. (injured) | 6 ft 1 in (1.85 m) | 170 lb (77 kg) | 2000-11-10 | Vanderbilt |
| C | 41 | Quinten Post | 7 ft 0 in (2.13 m) | 238 lb (108 kg) | 2000-03-21 | Boston College |
| F | 18 | Olivier-Maxence Prosper | 6 ft 7 in (2.01 m) | 230 lb (104 kg) | 2002-07-03 | Marquette |
| G | 5 | Richie Saunders (injured) (TW) | 6 ft 5 in (1.96 m) | 200 lb (91 kg) | 2001-09-19 | BYU |
| G | 10 | Javon Small (TW) | 6 ft 1 in (1.85 m) | 190 lb (86 kg) | 2002-12-19 | West Virginia |
| G | 24 | Cam Spencer | 6 ft 3 in (1.91 m) | 205 lb (93 kg) | 2000-04-06 | Connecticut |
| F/C | 28 | Isaiah Stewart | 6 ft 8 in (2.03 m) | 250 lb (113 kg) | 2001-05-22 | Washington |
| F | 0 | Jaylen Wells | 6 ft 7 in (2.01 m) | 205 lb (93 kg) | 2003-08-26 | Washington State |

Coaches
Head coach
- Tuomas Iisalo
Assistant(s)
- Darnell Lazare
- Jason March
- Ryan Saunders (lead assistant)
- Erick Schmidt

Legend
- (DP) Unsigned draft pick
- (FA) Free agent
- (S) Suspended
- (GL) On assignment to G League affiliate
- (TW) Two-way affiliate player
- Injured

Roster
Updated: November 7, 2026

=== Retained draft rights ===
The Grizzlies hold the draft rights to the following unsigned draft picks who have been playing outside the NBA. A drafted player, either an international draftee or a college draftee who is not signed by the team that drafted him, is allowed to sign with any non-NBA teams. In this case, the team retains the player's draft rights in the NBA until one year after the player's contract with the non-NBA team ends. This list includes draft rights that were acquired from trades with other teams.

| Draft | Round | Pick | Player | Pos. | Nationality | Current team | Note(s) | Ref |
|---|---|---|---|---|---|---|---|---|
| 2026 | 2 | 32 | Richie Saunders | G/F | United States | Memphis Hustle (NBA G League) | | |
| 2014 | 2 | 54 | Nemanja Dangubić | G/F | Serbia | Dubai Basketball (United Arab Emirates) | Acquired from the Philadelphia 76ers (via San Antonio and Brooklyn) | |

=== Basketball Hall of Famers ===
Memphis Grizzlies Hall of Famers
Players
| No. | Name | Position | Tenure | Inducted |
|---|---|---|---|---|
| 3 | Allen Iverson | G | 2009 | 2016 |
| 16 | Pau Gasol | F/C | 2001–2008 | 2023 |
| 15 | Vince Carter | G/F | 2014–2017 | 2024 |
Contributors
| Name | | Position | Tenure | Inducted |
| Hubie Brown | | Head coach | 2002–2004 | 2005 |
| Jerry West | | General manager | 2002–2007 | 2024 |

=== FIBA Hall of Famers ===
Memphis Grizzlies Hall of Famers
Players
| No. | Name | Position | Tenure | Inducted |
|---|---|---|---|---|
| 16 | Pau Gasol | F/C | 2001–2008 | 2025 |

=== Retired numbers ===
The Grizzlies originally planned to retire Tony Allen's no. 9 jersey on January 28, 2022. However, in November 2021, the ceremony was postponed at the request of Allen. In September 2024, it was announced that the ceremony would go ahead on March 15, 2025.

After trading Mike Conley Jr., the team announced they would retire Conley Jr.'s no. 11 jersey.

The NBA retired Bill Russell's no. 6 for all its member teams on August 11, 2022.

Memphis Grizzlies retired numbers
| No. | Name | Position | Tenure | Retired |
|---|---|---|---|---|
| 9 | Tony Allen | SG / SF | 2010–2017 | March 15, 2025 |
| 33 | Marc Gasol | C | 2008–2019 | April 6, 2024 |
| 50 | Zach Randolph | PF | 2009–2017 | December 11, 2021 |
| | Don Poier | Broadcaster | 1995–2005 | April 20, 2005 |

== Television and radio ==
Beginning with the 2026–27 season, regionally telecast Grizzlies games air on the DAZN streaming platform.

Before 2026, the Grizzlies appeared on television on the pay-TV channel FanDuel Sports Network Southeast, owned and operated by FanDuel Sports Network. The TV broadcast crew is play-by-play announcer Pete Pranica, analyst Brevin Knight and sideline reporter Rob Fischer. Since the 2024–25 season, 5 games are simulcast over-the-air on Gray Media owned WMC-TV, WSMV-TV and WBXX-TV.

On radio, the Grizzlies are heard on their flagship station WMFS-FM "ESPN 92.9". The radio broadcast crew is play-by-play announcer Eric Hasseltine, and analysts Hank McDowell and Elliot Perry.

== Staff ==
=== General managers ===
GM history
| GM | Tenure |
|---|---|
| Stu Jackson | 1995–2000 |
| Billy Knight | 2000–2002 |
| Dick Versace | 2002–2005 |
| Jerry West | 2005–2007 |
| Chris Wallace | 2007–2019 |
| Zach Kleiman | 2019–present |

== Traditions ==
=== Mascot ===
Grizz is the official mascot of the Memphis Grizzlies. He was first introduced in 1995 when the team was in Vancouver, British Columbia. Grizz was named 2011 NBA Mascot of the Year.

==== Friends of Grizz ====
In 2007, the performer playing Grizz was diagnosed with cancer. As a show of support, the Grizzlies chose not to have Grizz appear until he recovered. During this period, mascots from other teams performed at Grizzlies home games in Grizz's place. The franchise also launched a program called "Friends of Grizz", with donations and proceedings going to St. Jude Children's Research Hospital.

=== Growl Towels ===
Growl Towels are the Grizzlies' trademark gold rally towels given to fans at every home playoff game. Originally white, they made their debut in 2004 in the third and fourth games of the franchise's first ever playoff series. They switched to gold when the Grizzlies changed their team colors for the 2004–2005 season. Since 2013, Growl Towels have rotated various popular team slogans such as "Grit & Grind", "All Heart", or "Ain't No Runnin' in the M", and each towel identifies the playoff year, round and game number it was released. They became notable across the league during Memphis' seven consecutive playoff runs starting in 2011. During their 2013 run to the Western Conference Finals, the Grizzlies printed over 100,000 towels.

=== "Whoop that Trick" ===
The popular song by Memphis rapper Al Kapone from the locally filmed Hustle & Flow has become a standard during Grizzlies games since erupting as a spontaneous chant among fans during the 2013 playoff series against the Los Angeles Clippers.

== Rivalries ==
=== Los Angeles Clippers ===
Despite being one of the youngest squads in the NBA, the Grizzlies are rivals with the Los Angeles Clippers, since the 2011–12 season, when the Clippers eliminated the Grizzlies in seven games in the first round of the 2012 NBA playoffs. The Grizzlies returned the favor in the 2012–13 season, eliminating the Clippers in six games in the first round of the 2013 NBA playoffs. There have also been violent scuffles between the players, mainly between the Grizzlies Zach Randolph and the Clippers Blake Griffin. The Grizzlies are also the first team to draw an ejection on Clippers guard Chris Paul after he elbowed Marc Gasol in the ribs in the closing minutes of Game 6. When asked about a rivalry with the Los Angeles Lakers, Clippers center DeAndre Jordan stated, "I don't think it'll ever be a rivalry. You guys [in the media] want it to be, though. I would say Memphis more than the Lakers. I hate every other NBA team in the league. If anybody [is our rival], I'd say Memphis." Although the two teams never met in the 2014 playoffs, they still engaged in close, heated matchups in the 2014–15 season. In a Grizzlies home game against the Clippers, the crowd was given flip-flop sandals designating Clippers players as "floppers". Clippers leads all time meeting 52–49.

=== Oklahoma City Thunder ===
The Grizzlies also have a rivalry brewing with the Oklahoma City Thunder, dating back to when the teams were based in Vancouver and Seattle, respectively. The squads have faced each other in the playoffs in 2011, 2013, 2014, and 2025 with the Thunder beating the Grizzlies in the conference semifinals in 2011 and in the conference quarterfinals in 2014, both in seven games. The Grizzlies handled the Thunder in five games during the conference semifinals in 2013 before getting beaten by the San Antonio Spurs in the conference finals that same year. Thunder leads all time meeting 66–35.

=== San Antonio Spurs ===
The Grizzlies' rivalry with the San Antonio Spurs goes way back in 2004 when the Spurs swept the Grizzlies in the first round. Seven years later, they would meet again in the 2011 NBA playoffs. The Grizzlies upset the Spurs in six games, which made it the fourth time ever an 8th seed beat a first seed in the playoffs. They would then meet again in the conference finals in 2013, where the Spurs once again swept the Grizzlies to go to the NBA Finals. The Grizzlies got swept again by the Spurs in 2016 due to a multitude of injuries suffered during the season. They met again the following year, where the Grizzlies lost in six games. The Grizzlies got payback on the Spurs in the 2021, play-in tournament by the score of 100–96. Spurs leads all time meeting 74–35.
