= Ubiquiti =

American technology company

Ubiquiti Inc.
- Formerly: Ubiquiti Networks, Inc.
- Type: Public
- Traded as: NYSE: UI; Russell 1000 component
- Industry: Computer networking
- Founded: October 2003; 23 years ago in San Jose, California, United States
- Founders: Robert Pera
- Headquarters: New York City, US
- Products: Computer networking devices
- Revenue: ▲US$2.57 billion (2025)
- Operating income: ▲US$836 million (2025)
- Net income: ▲US$712 million (2025)
- Total assets: ▲US$1.47 billion (2025)
- Total equity: ▲US$668 million (2025)
- Number of employees: 1,667 (2025)
- Website: www.ui.com

Ubiquiti Inc. (formerly Ubiquiti Networks, Inc.) is an American technology company founded in San Jose, California, in 2003. Now based in New York City, Ubiquiti manufactures and sells wireless data communication and wired products for enterprises and homes under multiple brand names. On October 13, 2011, Ubiquiti had its initial public offering (IPO) at 7.04 million shares, at $15 per share, raising $30.5 million.

== Products ==
Ubiquiti's first product line was its "Super Range" mini-PCI radio card series, which was followed by other wireless products.

The company's Xtreme Range (XR) cards operated on non-standard IEEE 802.11 bands, which reduced the impact of congestion in the 2.4 GHz and 5.8 GHz bands. In August 2007 a group of Italian amateur radio operators set a distance world record for point-to-point links in the 5.8 GHz spectrum. Using two XR5 cards and a pair of 35 dBi dish antennas, the Italian team was able to establish a 304 km (about 188 mi) link at data rates between 4 and 5 Mbit/s.

The company (under its "Ubiquiti Labs" brand) also manufactures a home-oriented wireless mesh network router and access point combination device, as a consumer-level product called AmpliFi.

=== Brands ===
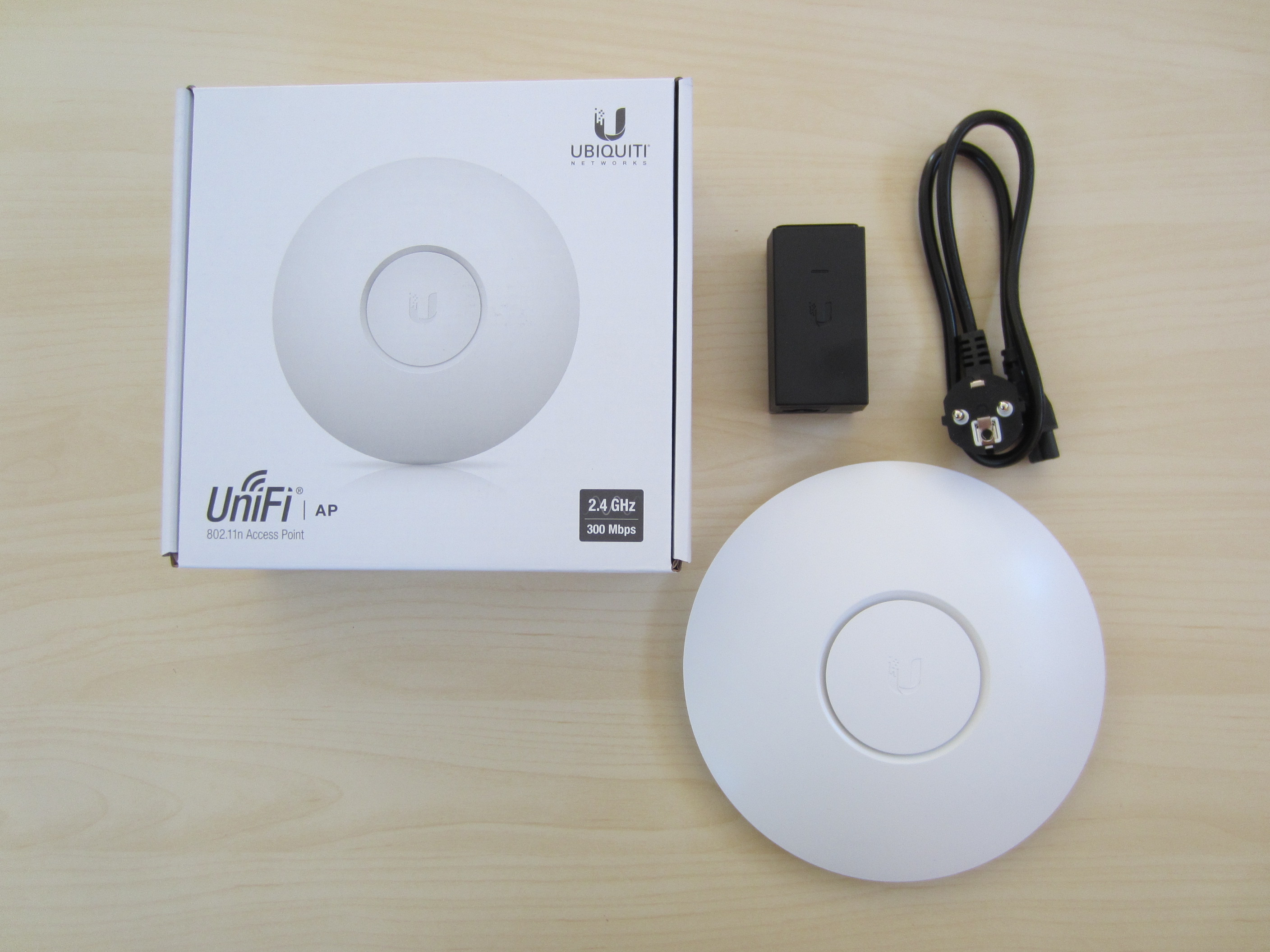
A UniFi wireless access point

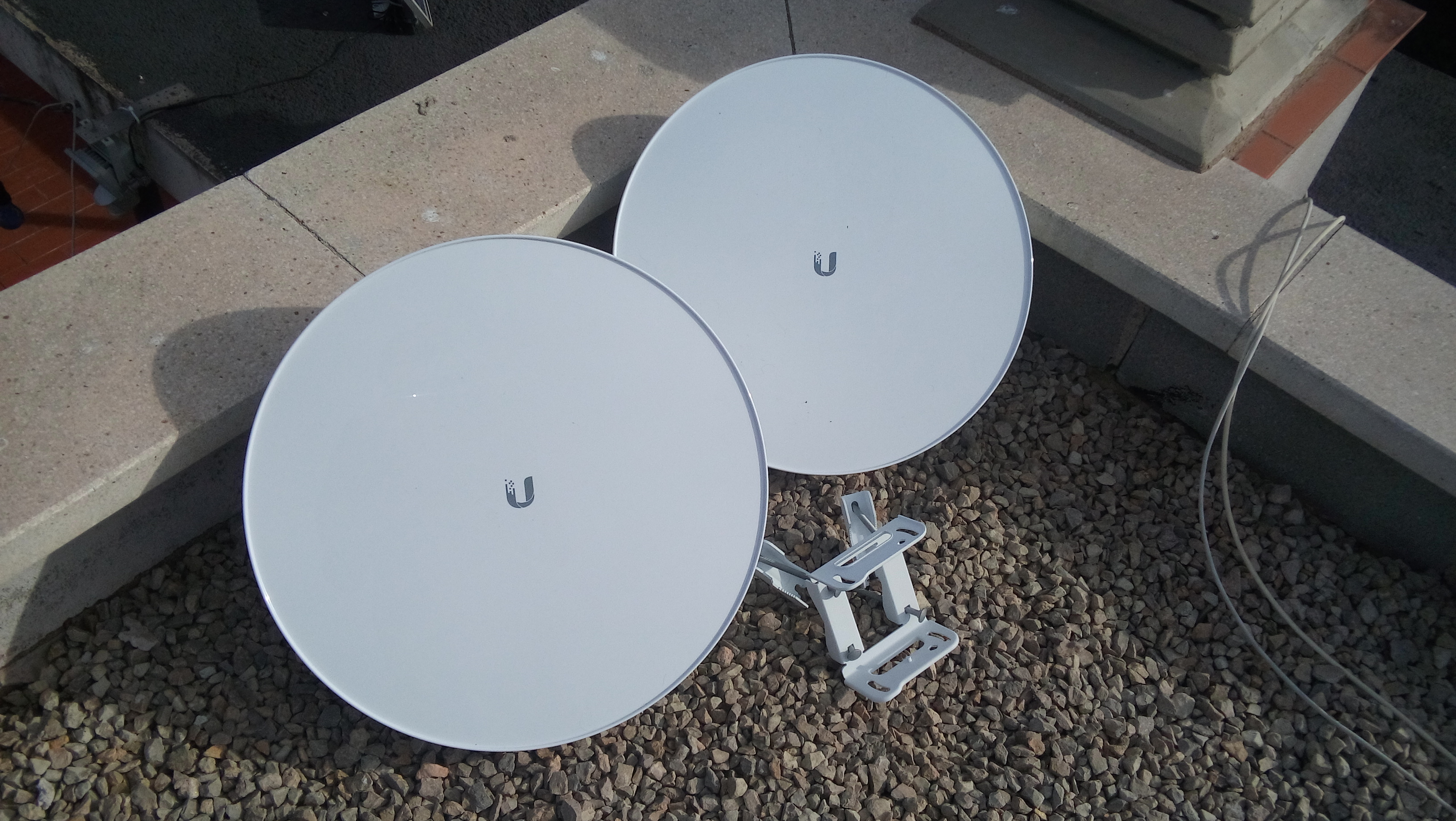
A pair of Ubiquiti internet PTP antennas

Ubiquiti product lines include UniFi, AmpliFi, EdgeMax, UISP, airMAX, airFiber, GigaBeam, and UFiber.

Their most well known product line is UniFi which is focused on home, prosumer, business wired and wireless networking in addition to IP cameras, physical access control systems, and VoIP phones. The EdgeMax product line is dedicated to wired networking, containing only routers and switches. UISP, announced in 2020, is a range of products for internet service providers.

airMAX is a product line dedicated to creating point-to-point (PtP) and point-to-multipoint (PtMP) links between networks. airFiber and UFiber are used by wireless and fiber Internet service providers (ISP) respectively.

=== Software products ===
Ubiquiti develops a variety of software controllers for their various products including access points, routers, switches, cameras, and locks. These controllers manage all connected devices and provide a single point for configuration and administration. The software is included as part of UniFi OS, an operating system that runs on devices called UniFi OS Consoles (UniFi Dream Machine, Dream Wall, Dream Router, Cloud Key).

The UniFi Network controller can alternatively be installed on Linux, FreeBSD, macOS, or Windows, while the other applications included with UniFi OS such as UniFi Protect and UniFi Access must be installed on a UniFi OS Console device.

WiFiman is an internet speed test and network analyzer tool that is integrated into most Ubiquiti products. It has mobile apps and a web version.

== Security issues ==
=== U-Boot configuration extraction ===
In 2013, a boot loader security issue was discovered in the version of the U-Boot shipped on Ubiquiti's devices. It was possible to extract the plaintext configuration from the device without leaving a trace using Trivial File Transfer Protocol (TFTP) and an Ethernet cable, revealing information such as passwords.

While the issue is fixed in current versions of Ubiquiti hardware, despite many requests and acknowledgment that they are using GPL-protected application, Ubiquiti refused to provide the source code for the GNU General Public License (GPL)-licensed U-Boot. This made it impractical for Ubiquiti's customers to fix the issue. The GPL-licensed code was released eventually.

=== Upatre Trojan ===
It was reported by online reporter Brian Krebs, on June 15, 2015, that "Recently, researchers at the Fujitsu Security Operations Center in Warrington, UK began tracking [the] Upatre [trojan software] being served from hundreds of compromised home routers – particularly routers powered by MikroTik and Ubiquiti's airOS".

Bryan Campbell of the Fujitsu Security Operations Center in Warrington, UK was reported as saying: "We have seen literally hundreds of wireless access points and routers connected in relation to this botnet, usually AirOS ... The consistency in which the botnet is communicating with compromised routers in relation to both distribution and communication leads us to believe known vulnerabilities are being exploited in the firmware which allows this to occur."

=== 2021 alleged data breach and lawsuit ===
In January 2021, a potential data breach of cloud accounts was reported, with customer credentials having potentially been exposed to an unauthorized third party.

In March 2021 security blogger Brian Krebs reported that a whistleblower disclosed that Ubiquiti's January statement downplayed the extent of the data breach in an effort to protect the company's stock price. Furthermore, the whistleblower claimed that the company's response to the breach put the security of its customers at risk. Ubiquiti responded to Krebs's reporting in a blog post, stating that the attacker "never claimed to have accessed any customer information" and "unsuccessfully attempted to extort the company by threatening to release stolen source code and specific IT credentials." Ubiquiti further wrote that they "believe that customer data was not the target of, or otherwise accessed in connection with, the incident."

On December 1, 2021, the United States Attorney for the Southern District of New York charged a former high-level employee of Ubiquiti for data theft and wire fraud, alleging that the "data breach" was in fact an inside job aimed at extorting millions of dollars from the company. The indictment also claimed that the employee caused further damage "by causing the publication of misleading news articles about the company's handling of the breach that he perpetrated, which were followed by a significant drop in the company's share price associated with the loss of billions of dollars in its market capitalization." The Verge reported that the indictment shed new light on the supposed breach and appeared to back up Ubiquiti's statement that no customer data was compromised.

In March 2022, Ubiquiti filed a lawsuit against Brian Krebs, alleging defamation for his reporting on their security issues. Both parties resolved their dispute outside the court in September 2022.

=== Other ===
In 2015, Ubiquiti revealed that it lost $46.7 million when its finance department was tricked into sending money to someone posing as an employee.

== Legal difficulties ==
=== United States sanctions against Iran ===
In March 2014, Ubiquiti agreed to pay $504,225 to the Office of Foreign Assets Control after it allegedly violated U.S. sanctions against Iran.

=== Open-source licensing compliance ===
In 2015, Ubiquiti was accused of violating the terms of the GNU General Public License (GPL) for open-source code used in their products. The original source of the complaint updated their website on May 24, 2017, when the issue was resolved. In 2019, Ubiquiti was reported as again being in violation of the GPL.

=== Ukraine human rights lawsuit ===
In August 2026, DiCello Levitt filed a human rights lawsuit against Ubiquiti on behalf of Ukrainian civilians and families, alleging that the company's networking technology helped power Russian battlefield communications used in drone attacks against civilians in Ukraine.

== Russo-Ukrainian War ==
In January 2024, the United States Department of Justice blocked an exploit that Russian Military Unit 26165 had been using on compromised Ubiquiti Edge OS routers as part of a cyber campaign against the United States and its allies, including Ukraine.

In July 2025, Zvezda published videos from the Russian Ministry of Defense of the 25th Combined Arms Army troops installing UISP Litebeam 5AC wireless communication systems. The Russian Ministry of Defence stated the wireless technologies significantly increased the efficiency of unit management in the Russo-Ukrainian war (2022–present).

In October 2025, Russia-1 shared footage of troops of the 36th Guards Combined Arms Army unboxing a Ubiquiti Litebeam, and climbing a telecommunications pole with a Ubiquiti product in Donetsk People's Republic.

Another October 2025 article from TASS, reported 200 signal troops were involved in communication exercises in the Saint Petersburg region. A signalman can be seen logging into and using Ubiquiti's airOS operating system.

On January 27, 2026, Hunterbrook, a short seller of Ubiquiti stock, published an article outlining Russia's allegedly large-scale deployment of Ubiquiti products to the frontlines of the Russo-Ukrainian war. Hunterbrook alleges that Ubiquiti violates sanction law by not taking action to disrupt the distribution of its products to the Russian Armed Forces.

In February 2026, the Ukrainian 68th Jaeger Brigade shared footage of Ubiquiti antennaes being used by the Russian army in the Pokrovsk direction.

On March 27, 2026 the dissident group Pussy Riot protested at Ubiquiti's headquarters in New York, protesting against Ubiquiti to stop the use of their products assisting Russian military's communications. The group wore ski masks and held a sign that said "UBIQUITI POWERS RUSSIAN WAR CRIMES". Spokesperson Nadya Tolokonnikova presented footage of Ubiquiti products and step-by-step guides from Russian military telegram channels as well as list of demands.
