= Michael Heisley =

American businessman (1937–2014)

Michael E. Heisley Sr.
- Born: March 13, 1937; Washington, D.C., U.S.
- Died: April 26, 2014 (aged 77); Chicago, Illinois, U.S.
- Citizenship: United States
- Education: Georgetown University
- Occupation: businessman
- Known for: Majority owner of the Memphis Grizzlies
- Spouse(s): Married, 5 children

Michael E. Heisley (March 13, 1937 – April 26, 2014) was an American businessman and former majority owner of the Memphis Grizzlies. He founded The Heico Companies, a Chicago holding company.

== Biography ==
A computer salesman by trade, Heisley used $150,000 from selling his home and $10 million in bank loans to acquire Conco, maker of sewer and drain equipment, in 1979. Later Heisley expanded his holdings through the purchase of several near-bankrupt Rust Belt manufacturers, creating the holding company Heico Companies. As of 2009, Heico operates 40 companies, largely in steel, construction, and equipment.

Heisley was also involved in multiple business ventures, such as:

- Heico Holding, Inc.
- The Heico Companies, LLC
- Heico Acquisitions
- Stony Lane Partners

He appeared several times on the Forbes rich list, last on the Billionaires list in 2012 at $1.9B.

=== Memphis Grizzlies ===
He orchestrated the move of the Vancouver Grizzlies to Memphis in 2001, after promising to keep the franchise in Vancouver when he purchased it in 2000. He agreed in 2006 to sell his 70% controlling stake in the Grizzlies to a consortium including Christian Laettner and Brian Davis, but the group missed a deadline for the purchase and Heisley found no other bidder willing to meet the team's $300M asking price.

In 2012 Heisley decided to sell the Grizzlies and step aside from all of his corporate interests due to his advancing age. The team announced on June 11, 2012, that Ubiquiti Networks founder Robert J. Pera would be purchasing the team, but Heisley would remain on board until the sale was finalized. The sale was finalized on October 25, 2012, and the team is now a part of Memphis Basketball, LLC.

== Personal life ==
Heisley, was born in Washington, D.C., grew up in Alexandria, Virginia, and had residences in Chicago, Illinois, and Jupiter Island, Florida. He was a graduate of Georgetown University, and was married with five children.

He was instrumental in establishing and running the Heisley Family Foundation.

Heisley died on April 26, 2014, from complications due to a stroke. He was 77.

Sporting positions
Preceded by Arthur Griffiths	Vancouver/Memphis Grizzlies principal owner 2000–2012	Succeeded by Robert Pera
