= Robert Pera =

American businessman (born 1978)

- Born: March 10, 1978 (age 48); St. Louis, Missouri, U.S.
- Education: University of California, San Diego (BS, BA, MS)
- Title: Founder and CEO of Ubiquiti Inc.; Memphis Grizzlies owner
- Website: www.rjpblog.com

Robert J. Pera (born March 10, 1978) is an American businessman and engineer who is the founder and chief executive officer of Ubiquiti Inc., a global communications technology company that he took public in 2011. In October 2012, Pera also became the owner of the Memphis Grizzlies of the National Basketball Association. At the age of 36, Pera earned a spot on Forbes' list of the 10 youngest billionaires in the world.

As of March 2026, Forbes estimated his net worth at US$31.7 billion and that same year the Bloomberg Billionaires Index estimated his net worth at US$58.2 billion.

== Early life ==
Pera was born on March 10, 1978, in St. Louis, Missouri, to a father who worked in business consulting and a mother who worked in public relations. He established his first computer services company while attending high school. That company provided networking and database services to local businesses. Pera also played on his high school's basketball team until a heart condition, which has long since been resolved, kept him home for a year. After high school, Pera attended the University of California, San Diego, where he graduated Phi Beta Kappa with a B.S. in electrical engineering and a B.A. in Japanese language. He stayed on at UC San Diego and completed his master's in electrical engineering with an emphasis on digital communications and circuit design.

== Career ==
=== Apple ===
After graduation, Pera, who admired Steve Jobs, secured a job at Apple Inc., where he tested the company's Wi-Fi devices to ensure compliance with Federal Communications Commission standards for electromagnetic emissions. While working at Apple, Pera noticed that the power sources that Apple's Wi-Fi devices used to transmit signals were far below FCC limits. Boosting their power, he reasoned, could increase their transmission range to over dozens of miles, which could facilitate Internet access in areas that telephone and cable companies do not reach. When his bosses at Apple ignored his idea, Pera decided to build his own low-cost, high-performance Wi-Fi module. For the next year, Pera spent his nights and weekends in his apartment testing prototypes. By early 2005 he was ready to start his own business and he left Apple to form Ubiquiti Networks.

=== Ubiquiti Networks ===
Pera founded Ubiquiti Networks in March 2005 using $30,000 of personal savings and credit card debt. Ubiquiti's early products utilized existing Wi-Fi technology to wirelessly deliver the Internet to underserved areas (e.g., rural areas and emerging markets) lacking the infrastructure to access the Internet through traditional avenues such as phone lines and cable lines. The company has since successfully branched out into other product lines such as wireless access points, security cameras and traditional networking equipment (e.g., switches and routers).

=== Memphis Grizzlies ===
On June 11, 2012, sources told ESPN.com that Michael Heisley had an agreement in principle to sell the Memphis Grizzlies to Robert Pera. The official sale of the Memphis Grizzlies to Pera was approved on October 25, 2012. The Grizzlies made the NBA playoffs in the two seasons before Pera purchased the team and made the playoffs during the first five seasons of his tenure as owner. In the first year of Pera's ownership, the Grizzlies won a club record 56 games and made its first-ever appearance in the Western Conference Finals. The Grizzlies team won more playoff games during the first two years of Pera's tenure than it did during the team's 17 previous seasons in the NBA.

Pera is a supporter of the Grizzlies Foundation, a sports charity which operates in Memphis.

Sporting positions
Preceded by Michael Heisley	Memphis Grizzlies principal owner 2012–present	Incumbent
