= Zach Kleiman =

American basketball executive (born 1988)

Memphis Grizzlies
- Positions: General manager Executive vice president of basketball operations
- League: NBA

Personal information
- Born: 1988 (age 37–38) Chicago, Illinois, U.S.

Career information
- College: University of Southern California (BA); Duke University (JD)

Career highlights
- As executive: NBA Executive of the Year (2022)

Zach Kleiman (born 1988) is an American basketball executive who is the general manager and executive vice president of basketball operations for the Memphis Grizzlies of the National Basketball Association (NBA).

In 2022, Kleiman won the NBA Executive of the Year Award, having finished 6th place in voting for the award in 2020.

== Early life and career ==
Kleiman, born in 1988, was raised in the Lincoln Park neighborhood of Chicago as a Chicago Bulls fan. He attended the University of Chicago Laboratory Schools graduating from the High School in 2006.

Kleiman attended the University of Southern California majoring in psychology from 2006 to 2010. During this time, he served as a public relations intern for the Los Angeles Lakers and joined the Delta Tau Delta fraternity.

In 2013, Kleiman earned his J.D. from Duke University School of Law.

During the 2012-13 season, Kleiman was a basketball operations intern for the Charlotte Bobcats under general manager Rich Cho.

== Executive career ==
In 2015, Kleiman was an associate at Proskauer Rose when he accepted a position as team counsel of the Memphis Grizzlies.

Kleiman was promoted to Senior Director of Basketball Operations before the 2017-18 season.

Before the 2018–19 season, Kleiman was promoted to assistant general manager under general manager Chris Wallace.

Kleiman was named the executive vice president of basketball operations for the Memphis Grizzlies on April 11, 2019. This change in organizational structure makes Kleiman the Grizzlies' primary decision-maker in the front office. Immediately, Kleiman made seven trades, including sending long-time stalwart Mike Conley Jr. to Utah and veteran Andre Iguodala to Miami to reset the roster, collect draft picks and free up cap space. Kleiman emphasized that the team was "not going to be sacrificing the long-term future for short-term gains." After the 2019–20 season Kleiman finished in sixth place for the Executive of the Year Award.

In December 2020, Kleiman said "We have this group now that we think is genuinely special (and) it's on me, it's on us to continue to grow this group, to continue to build...The North Star continues to be competing to win championships over time."

In June 2021, Kleiman was signed to a long-term extension. Owner Robert Pera said "Zach has proven to be a strong cultural leader in this organization, consistently demonstrating high-integrity, hard-work, humility and a drive for continuous improvement. We have confidence in our strategy and believe it will result in an elite organization over the long-term." After the 2021–22 season he was named Executive of the Year.

By the end of the 2022-23 campaign, the Grizzlies' new era trio drafted by Kleiman - point guard Ja Morant, power forward/center Jaren Jackson Jr., and shooting guard Desmond Bane - had led the franchise into two straight years as the Western Conference's 2nd seed while posting 50 or more wins.

Over the course of the 2025–26 seasons, Kleiman broke up the young Grizzlies core and ushered in another rebuild by trading away Bane to the Orlando Magic and Jackson Jr. to the Utah Jazz. The deals netted Memphis seven total future first-round picks plus a pick swap. Orlando's 2025 and 2028 first-round pick rights were later used to trade up for Washington State forward Cedric Coward, who ultimately finished fifth in NBA Rookie of the Year voting. It came as partly of a result of the team not advancing past the first round of the playoffs despite their regular season success.

Under Kleiman's tenure, Memphis selected eight rookies that made an All-Rookie Team over eight drafts from 2018 to 2025: Jaren Jackson Jr. (2018 #4 ovr. pick), Morant (2019 #2 ovr. pick), Brandon Clarke (2019 #21 ovr. pick), Desmond Bane (2020 #30 ovr. pick), GG Jackson (2023 #45 ovr. pick), Zach Edey (2024 #9 ovr. pick), Jaylen Wells (2024 #39 ovr. pick), and Cedric Coward (2025 #11 ovr. pick).
