= Hansbrough =

Hansbrough is a surname. Notable people with the surname include:

- Ben Hansbrough (born 1987), American professional basketball player who played for the Notre Dame Fighting Irish, brother of Tyler Hansbrough
- Henry C. Hansbrough (1848–1933), American politician
- Tyler Hansbrough (born 1985), American NBA player, brother of Ben Hansbrough
