= 2012–13 Indiana Pacers season =

NBA professional basketball team season

- Division champions
- Head coach: Frank Vogel
- President: Donnie Walsh
- General manager: Kevin Pritchard
- Owner: Herb Simon
- Arena: Bankers Life Fieldhouse

Results
- Record: 49–32 (.605)
- Place: Division: 1st (Central); Conference: 3rd (Eastern)
- Playoff finish: Eastern Conference Finals (lost to Heat 3–4)
- Stats at Basketball Reference

Local media
- Television: Fox Sports Indiana
- Radio: WFNI

The 2012–13 Indiana Pacers season was 46th season of the franchise and 37th season in the National Basketball Association (NBA). The regular season ended with a 49–32 win–loss record; the team only played 81 games due to a game versus the Boston Celtics being cancelled following the Boston Marathon bombing. The cancelled matchup would have no effect on the already final Eastern Conference seeding anyway. The Pacers advanced to their first Conference finals in nine years after defeating the Atlanta Hawks and New York Knicks, each in six games. In the conference finals, they fell to the defending champion Miami Heat in seven games. The Heat would go on to win its third NBA championship and second straight overall after defeating the San Antonio Spurs in a seven-game NBA Finals series.

The season was the first since 1998–99 without Jeff Foster, who retired after 2011–12 season. This season also featured brothers Ben and Tyler Hansbrough.

== Key dates ==
- June 28: The 2012 NBA draft took place at Prudential Center in Newark, New Jersey.

== 2012 NBA draft ==
Round	Pick	Player	Position	Nationality	College
1	26	Miles Plumlee	C	United States	Duke
2	36	Orlando Johnson	SG	United States	UC Santa Barbara

== Roster ==
2012–13 Indiana Pacers roster
Players

Pos.	No.	Player	Height	Weight	DOB	From
PG	14	D. J. Augustin	6 ft 0 in (1.83 m)	183 lb (83 kg)	1987-11-10	Texas
SF	24	Paul George	6 ft 8 in (2.03 m)	221 lb (100 kg)	1990-05-02	Fresno State
SF	33	Danny Granger	6 ft 8 in (2.03 m)	228 lb (103 kg)	1983-04-20	New Mexico
SF	25	Gerald Green	6 ft 8 in (2.03 m)	210 lb (95 kg)	1986-01-26	Gulf Shores Academy (TX)
PG	23	Ben Hansbrough	6 ft 3 in (1.91 m)	203 lb (92 kg)	1987-12-23	Notre Dame
PF	50	Tyler Hansbrough	6 ft 9 in (2.06 m)	250 lb (113 kg)	1985-11-03	North Carolina
C	55	Roy Hibbert	7 ft 2 in (2.18 m)	280 lb (127 kg)	1986-12-11	Georgetown
PG	3	George Hill	6 ft 2 in (1.88 m)	190 lb (86 kg)	1986-05-04	IUPUI
SG	11	Orlando Johnson	6 ft 5 in (1.96 m)	220 lb (100 kg)	1989-03-11	UC Santa Barbara
C	28	Ian Mahinmi	6 ft 11 in (2.11 m)	230 lb (104 kg)	1986-11-05	France
PF	29	Jeff Pendergraph	6 ft 10 in (2.08 m)	250 lb (113 kg)	1987-04-29	Arizona State
C	13	Miles Plumlee	6 ft 11 in (2.11 m)	255 lb (116 kg)	1988-09-01	Duke
SG	1	Lance Stephenson	6 ft 5 in (1.96 m)	228 lb (103 kg)	1990-09-05	Cincinnati
PF	21	David West	6 ft 9 in (2.06 m)	250 lb (113 kg)	1980-08-29	Xavier
SG	4	Sam Young	6 ft 6 in (1.98 m)	225 lb (102 kg)	1985-06-01	Pittsburgh

Coaches
Head coach
- Frank Vogel
Assistant(s)
- Dan Burke
- Josh Corbeil (trainer)

Legend
- (DP) Unsigned draft pick
- (FA) Free agent
- (S) Suspended
- (DL) On assignment to D-League affiliate
- Injured

Roster
Updated: February 9, 2013

== Pre-season ==
2012 pre-season game log
Pre-season: 4–3 (home: 3–0; road: 1–3)

Game	Date	Team	Score	High points	High rebounds	High assists	Location Attendance	Record
1	October 10	@ Minnesota	L 70–84	Paul George (16)	Tyler Hansbrough (7)	Four players (2)	Fargodome; 9,163	0–1
2	October 12	Minnesota	W 96–91	Paul George (19)	Ian Mahinmi (8)	Ben Hansbrough (7)	Bankers Life Fieldhouse; 10,794	1–1
3	October 16	Atlanta	W 102–98	Paul George (20)	Roy Hibbert (11)	Paul George, Ben Hansbrough (4)	Bankers Life Fieldhouse; 10,786	2–1
4	October 19	@ Orlando	L 96–112	Tyler Hansbrough (23)	Paul George (7)	Sundiata Gaines, Lance Stephenson (3)	Amway Center; 17,204	2–2
5	October 20	Memphis	W 83–80	Gerald Green (18)	Tyler Hansbrough (13)	Paul George (3)	Bankers Life Fieldhouse; 13,399	3–2
6	October 23	@ Cleveland	W 100–82	Paul George (14)	David West (8)	D. J. Augustin (11)	Quicken Loans Arena; 10,040	4–2
7	October 26	@ Chicago	L 90–97	Roy Hibbert (17)	Paul George (10)	D. J. Augustin (13)	United Center; 9,149	4–3

2012–13 season schedule

== Regular season ==
=== Game log ===
Note: the Indiana Pacers only played 81 games due to the cancellation of the April 16, 2013 game vs the Boston Celtics.

2012–13 game log
Total: 49–32 (home: 30–11; road: 19–21)
October: 1–0 (home: 0–0; road: 1–0)

Game	Date	Team	Score	High points	High rebounds	High assists	Location Attendance	Record
1	October 31	@ Toronto	W 90–88	David West (25)	Paul George (15)	George Hill (7)	Air Canada Centre; 19,800	1–0

November : 7–8 (home: 4–2; road: 3–6)

Game	Date	Team	Score	High points	High rebounds	High assists	Location Attendance	Record
2	November 2	@ Charlotte	L 89–90	Hansbrough & Stephenson (15)	Ian Mahinmi (8)	Paul George (6)	Time Warner Cable Arena; 19,124	1–1
3	November 3	Sacramento	W 106–98	Hill & West (18)	David West (18)	George Hill (5)	Bankers Life Fieldhouse; 18,165	2–1
4	November 5	@ San Antonio	L 79–101	George Hill (15)	David West (11)	George Hill (6)	AT&T Center; 17,158	2–2
5	November 7	@ Atlanta	L 86–89	Hill & West (20)	George & Hibbert (7)	George Hill (5)	Philips Arena; 10,684	2–3
6	November 9	@ Minnesota	L 94–96	George Hill (29)	David West (13)	George Hill (7)	Target Center; 18,222	2–4
7	November 10	Washington	W 89–85	Paul George (20)	Roy Hibbert (12)	George Hill (5)	Bankers Life Fieldhouse; 12,036	3–4
8	November 13	Toronto	L 72–74	George Hill (18)	George & Hibbert (9)	Paul George (4)	Bankers Life Fieldhouse; 11,947	3–5
9	November 14	@ Milwaukee	L 85–99	Tyler Hansbrough (17)	David West (9)	Hill & Stephenson (4)	BMO Harris Bradley Center; 11,573	3–6
10	November 16	Dallas	W 103–83	Hill & West (15)	Roy Hibbert (8)	George Hill (7)	Bankers Life Fieldhouse; 15,110	4–6
11	November 18	@ New York	L 76–88	Paul George (20)	Hansbrough & Hibbert (8)	George Hill (6)	Madison Square Garden; 19,033	4–7
12	November 19	@ Washington	W 96–89	David West (30)	Hibbert (12)	George Hill (5)	Verizon Center; 14,426	5–7
13	November 21	New Orleans	W 115–107	Paul George (37)	Roy Hibbert (11)	George Hill (7)	Bankers Life Fieldhouse; 12,633	6–7
14	November 23	San Antonio	L 97–104	David West (22)	Tyler Hansbrough (12)	D. J. Augustin (8)	Bankers Life Fieldhouse; 17,082	6–8
15	November 27	@ L. A. Lakers	W 79–77	George Hill (19)	David West (10)	David West (8)	Staples Center; 18,997	7–8
16	November 30	@ Sacramento	W 97–92	David West (31)	David West (11)	Paul George (9)	Sleep Train Arena; 12,544	8–8

December : 10–5 (home: 6–1; road: 4–4)

Game	Date	Team	Score	High points	High rebounds	High assists	Location Attendance	Record
17	December 1	@ Golden State	L 92–103	David West (23)	David West (8)	George, Stephenson, & West (4)	Oracle Arena; 18,623	8–9
18	December 4	@ Chicago	W 80–76	Paul George (34)	Roy Hibbert (11)	West & Hill (5)	United Center; 21,252	9–9
19	December 5	Portland	W 99–92	Paul George (22)	David West (10)	Paul George (5)	Bankers Life Fieldhouse; 11,569	10–9
20	December 7	Denver	L 89–92	Paul George (22)	David West (11)	George Hill (10)	Bankers Life Fieldhouse; 15,289	10–10
21	December 9	@ Oklahoma City	L 93–104	David West (21)	David West (9)	George & Hill (3)	Chesapeake Energy Arena; 18,203	10–11
22	December 12	Cleveland	W 96–81	Paul George (27)	Roy Hibbert (12)	David West (7)	Bankers Life Fieldhouse; 11,595	11–11
23	December 14	Philadelphia	W 95–85	Paul George (28)	Roy Hibbert (13)	George Hill (10)	Bankers Life Fieldhouse; 13,538	12–11
24	December 15	@ Detroit	W 88–77	David West (23)	Paul George (8)	Paul George (8)	The Palace of Auburn Hills; 13,235	13–11
25	December 18	@ Milwaukee	L 93–98	George Hill (18)	George & Hibbert (10)	Paul George (5)	BMO Harris Bradley Center; 11,739	13–12
26	December 19	Utah	W 104–84	Gerald Green (21)	Paul George (11)	George Hill (5)	Bankers Life Fieldhouse; 13,559	14–12
27	December 21	@ Cleveland	W 99–89	Roy Hibbert (18)	David West (10)	Lance Stephenson (7)	Quicken Loans Arena; 14,105	15–12
28	December 22	@ New Orleans	W 81–75	David West (25)	Paul George (12)	George Hill (6)	New Orleans Arena; 15,042	16–12
29	December 28	Phoenix	W 97–91	George Hill (22)	Roy Hibbert (14)	Lance Stephenson (5)	Bankers Life Fieldhouse; 15,288	17–12
30	December 29	@ Atlanta	L 100–109	David West (29)	Tyler Hansbrough (9)	Paul George (8)	Philips Arena; 16,558	17–13
31	December 31	Memphis	W 88–83	Paul George (21)	David West (9)	D. J. Augustin (6)	Bankers Life Fieldhouse; 14,979	18–13

January : 9–6 (home: 7–0; road: 2–6)

Game	Date	Team	Score	High points	High rebounds	High assists	Location Attendance	Record
32	January 2	Washington	W 89–81	Paul George (29)	Paul George (14)	D. J. Augustin (6)	Bankers Life Fieldhouse; 11,182	19–13
33	January 4	@ Boston	L 75–94	Tyler Hansbrough (19)	Hibbert & West (10)	Augustin & George (4)	TD Garden; 18,624	19–14
34	January 5	Milwaukee	W 95–80	Roy Hibbert (20)	Roy Hibbert (15)	George & Hill (4)	Bankers Life Fieldhouse; 15,329	20–14
35	January 8	Miami	W 87–77	Paul George (29)	Roy Hibbert (14)	D. J. Augustin (8)	Bankers Life Fieldhouse; 18,165	21–14
36	January 10	New York	W 81–76	Paul George (29)	Paul George (11)	Paul George (5)	Bankers Life Fieldhouse; 16,568	22–14
37	January 12	Charlotte	W 96–88	George Hill (19)	David West (12)	David West (10)	Bankers Life Fieldhouse; 13,656	23–14
38	January 13	@ Brooklyn	L 86–97	David West (27)	Paul George (12)	D. J. Augustin (4)	Barclays Center; 16,499	23–15
39	January 15	@ Charlotte	W 103–76	Roy Hibbert (18)	Paul George (10)	Lance Stephenson (6)	Time Warner Cable Arena; 12,996	24–15
40	January 16	@ Orlando	L 86–97	Paul George (20)	Paul George (10)	George Hill (6)	Amway Center; 17,499	24–16
41	January 18	Houston	W 105–95	Paul George (31)	David West (11)	David West (7)	Bankers Life Fieldhouse; 16,902	25–16
42	January 21	@ Memphis	W 82–81	David West (14)	Paul George (10)	Paul George (9)	FedExForum; 17,508	26–16
43	January 23	@ Portland	L 80–100	Paul George (22)	George & West (7)	Hill, Stephenson, & West (3)	Rose Garden; 18,934	26–17
44	January 26	@ Utah	L 110–114 (OT)	David West (24)	Roy Hibbert (12)	George Hill (8)	EnergySolutions Arena; 19,201	26–18
45	January 28	@ Denver	L 101–102	Paul George (23)	Roy Hibbert (11)	George Hill (6)	Pepsi Center; 16,032	26–19
46	January 30	Detroit	W 98–79	Roy Hibbert (18)	Hansbrough, Hibbert, & Stephenson (11)	Lance Stephenson (5)	Bankers Life Fieldhouse; 12,137	27–19

February : 9–3 (home: 7–3; road: 2–0)

Game	Date	Team	Score	High points	High rebounds	High assists	Location Attendance	Record
47	February 1	Miami	W 102–89	David West (30)	David West (7)	Paul George (6)	Bankers Life Fieldhouse; 18,165	28–19
48	February 4	Chicago	W 111–101	David West (29)	Paul George (11)	George Hill (6)	Bankers Life Fieldhouse; 18,165	29–19
49	February 5	Atlanta	W 114–103	Paul George (29)	Roy Hibbert (8)	George Hill (8)	Bankers Life Fieldhouse; 12,578	30–19
50	February 6	@ Philadelphia	W 88–69	Roy Hibbert (18)	Roy Hibbert (14)	Paul George (6)	Wells Fargo Center; 15,299	31–19
51	February 8	Toronto	L 98–100 (OT)	David West (30)	Paul George (14)	George & Hill (5)	Bankers Life Fieldhouse; 16,253	31–20
52	February 11	Brooklyn	L 84–89	George Hill (22)	Roy Hibbert (10)	George Hill (6)	Bankers Life Fieldhouse; 11,672	31–21
53	February 13	Charlotte	W 101–77	Paul George (23)	Paul George (12)	Paul George (12)	Bankers Life Fieldhouse; 11,707	32–21
All-Star Break
54	February 20	New York	W 125–91	Paul George (27)	David West (9)	George Hill (5)	Bankers Life Fieldhouse; 16,123	33–21
55	February 22	Detroit	W 114–82	David West (18)	David West (8)	George Hill (6)	Bankers Life Fieldhouse; 17,750	34–21
56	February 23	@ Detroit	W 90–72	George Hill (17)	Paul George (12)	Paul George (8)	The Palace of Auburn Hills; 17,509	35–21
57	February 26	Golden State	W 108–97	David West (28)	Paul George (11)	George Hill (7)	Bankers Life Fieldhouse; 14,426	36–21
58	February 28	L. A. Clippers	L 91–99	David West (22)	Lance Stephenson (7)	Paul George (5)	Bankers Life Fieldhouse; 18,165	36–22

March : 11–5 (home: 5–2; road: 6–3)

Game	Date	Team	Score	High points	High rebounds	High assists	Location Attendance	Record
59	March 1	@ Toronto	W 93–81	Paul George (22)	David West (11)	D. J. Augustin (7)	Air Canada Centre; 18,268	37–22
60	March 3	Chicago	W 97–92	David West (31)	George & Hibbert (10)	Paul George (6)	Bankers Life Fieldhouse; 17,533	38–22
61	March 6	Boston	L 81–83	Paul George (16)	Roy Hibbert (16)	David West (4)	Bankers Life Fieldhouse; 17,833	38–23
62	March 8	@ Orlando	W 115–86	Paul George (25)	David West (7)	D. J. Augustin (8)	Amway Center; 16,515	39–23
63	March 10	@ Miami	L 91–105	David West (24)	Paul George (6)	Paul George (5)	American Airlines Arena; 20,219	39–24
64	March 13	Minnesota	W 107–91	Roy Hibbert (27)	Roy Hibbert (12)	David West (6)	Bankers Life Fieldhouse; 14,187	40–24
65	March 15	L. A. Lakers	L 93–99	George Hill (27)	Lance Stephenson (11)	Lance Stephenson (5)	Bankers Life Fieldhouse; 18,165	40–25
66	March 16	@ Philadelphia	L 91–98	Roy Hibbert (25)	Paul George (14)	Paul George (8)	Wells Fargo Center; 18,587	40–26
67	March 18	@ Cleveland	W 111–90	Gerald Green (20)	Tyler Hansbrough (11)	George Hill (7)	Quicken Loans Arena; 13,016	41–26
68	March 19	Orlando	W 95–73	Paul George (19)	Tyler Hansbrough (14)	Orlando Johnson (5)	Bankers Life Fieldhouse; 14,343	42–26
69	March 22	Milwaukee	W 102–78	Tyler Hansbrough (22)	Tyler Hansbrough (12)	Paul George (6)	Bankers Life Fieldhouse; 18,165	43–26
70	March 23	@ Chicago	L 84–87	Paul George (23)	Roy Hibbert (12)	Tyler Hansbrough (3)	United Center; 22,494	43–27
71	March 25	Atlanta	W 100–94	Gerald Green (19)	Roy Hibbert (13)	D. J. Augustin (5)	Bankers Life Fieldhouse; 14,336	44–27
72	March 27	@ Houston	W 100–91	Roy Hibbert (28)	Roy Hibbert (13)	George Hill (5)	Toyota Center; 18,134	45–27
73	March 28	@ Dallas	W 103–78	Paul George (24)	Roy Hibbert (11)	Paul George (6)	American Airlines Center; 20,037	46–27
74	March 30	@ Phoenix	W 112–104	Paul George (25)	David West (7)	Paul George & David West (4)	US Airways Center; 17,090	47–27

April: 2–5 (home: 1–3; road: 1–2)

Game	Date	Team	Score	High points	High rebounds	High assists	Location Attendance	Record
75	April 1	@ L. A. Clippers	W 109–106	Roy Hibbert (26)	Roy Hibbert (10)	Paul George (10)	Staples Center; 19,384	48–27
76	April 5	Oklahoma City	L 75–97	Roy Hibbert (22)	Roy Hibbert (8)	Stephenson & Hill (3)	Bankers Life Fieldhouse; 18,165	48–28
77	April 6	@ Washington	L 85–104	Roy Hibbert (25)	David West (10)	Paul George & Hill (3)	Verizon Center; 19,360	48–29
78	April 9	Cleveland	W 99–94	George Hill (27)	David West (9)	George Hill (4)	Bankers Life Fieldhouse; 15,279	49–29
79	April 12	Brooklyn	L 109–117	David West (26)	Roy Hibbert (10)	George Hill (10)	Bankers Life Fieldhouse; 18,165	49–30
80	April 14	@ New York	L 80–90	Lance Stephenson (22)	Roy Hibbert (10)	George Hill (11)	Madison Square Garden; 19,033	49–31
–	April 16	@ Boston	Game canceled due to the Boston Marathon bombing.					
81	April 17	Philadelphia	L 95–105	Gerald Green (34)	Tyler Hansbrough (9)	Lance Stephenson (6)	Bankers Life Fieldhouse; 18,165	49–32

2012–13 season schedule

=== Standings ===
Central Division	W	L	PCT	GB	Home	Road	Div	GP
y-Indiana Pacers	49	32	.605	–	30–11	19–21	13–3	81†
x-Chicago Bulls	45	37	.549	4.5	24–17	21–20	9–7	82
x-Milwaukee Bucks	38	44	.463	11.5	21–20	17–24	7–9	82
Detroit Pistons	29	53	.354	20.5	18–23	11–30	8–8	82
Cleveland Cavaliers	24	58	.293	25.5	14–27	10–31	3–13	82

Eastern Conference
#	Team	W	L	PCT	GB	GP
1	z-Miami Heat *	66	16	.805	–	82
2	y-New York Knicks *	54	28	.659	12.0	82
3	y-Indiana Pacers *	49	32	.605	16.5	81
4	x-Brooklyn Nets	49	33	.598	17.0	82
5	x-Chicago Bulls	45	37	.549	21.0	82
6	x-Atlanta Hawks	44	38	.537	22.0	82
7	x-Boston Celtics	41	40	.506	24.5	81
8	x-Milwaukee Bucks	38	44	.463	28.0	82
9	Philadelphia 76ers	34	48	.415	32.0	82
10	Toronto Raptors	34	48	.415	32.0	82
11	Washington Wizards	29	53	.354	37.0	82
12	Detroit Pistons	29	53	.354	37.0	82
13	Cleveland Cavaliers	24	58	.293	42.0	82
14	Charlotte Bobcats	21	61	.256	45.0	82
15	Orlando Magic	20	62	.244	46.0	82

== Playoffs ==
2013 playoff game log
Total: 11–8 (home: 8–1; road: 3–7)
First Round: 4–2 (home: 3–0; road: 1–2)

Game	Date	Team	Score	High points	High rebounds	High assists	Location Attendance	Series
1	April 21	Atlanta	W 107–90	Paul George (23)	Paul George (11)	Paul George (12)	Bankers Life Fieldhouse; 18,165	1–0
2	April 24	Atlanta	W 113–98	Paul George (27)	Roy Hibbert (9)	George, West, Hibbert, Hill, & Augustin (3)	Bankers Life Fieldhouse; 18,165	2–0
3	April 27	@ Atlanta	L 69–90	West (18)	George, Hibbert, & Hansbrough (9)	George Hill (3)	Philips Arena; 18,238	2–1
4	April 29	@ Atlanta	L 91–102	Paul George (21)	Paul George (12)	Lance Stephenson (8)	Philips Arena; 18,241	2–2
5	May 1	Atlanta	W 106–83	David West (24)	Lance Stephenson (12)	George Hill (10)	Bankers Life Fieldhouse; 18,165	3–2
6	May 3	@ Atlanta	W 81–73	West & Hill (21)	Hibbert & Stephenon (11)	Paul George (7)	Philips Arena; 18,238	4–2

Conference Semifinals: 4–2 (home: 3–0; road: 1–2)

Game	Date	Team	Score	High points	High rebounds	High assists	Location Attendance	Series
1	May 5	@ New York	W 102–95	David West (20)	Lance Stephenson (13)	George Hill (6)	Madison Square Garden; 19,033	1–0
2	May 7	@ New York	L 79–105	Paul George (20)	Roy Hibbert (12)	George Hill (7)	Madison Square Garden; 19,033	1–1
3	May 11	New York	W 82–71	Roy Hibbert (24)	Hibbert & West (12)	Paul George (8)	Bankers Life Fieldhouse; 18,165	2–1
4	May 14	New York	W 93–82	George Hill (26)	Paul George (14)	Paul George (7)	Bankers Life Fieldhouse; 18,165	3–1
5	May 16	@ New York	L 75–85	Paul George (23)	David West (10)	Paul George (6)	Madison Square Garden; 19,033	3–2
6	May 18	New York	W 106–99	Lance Stephenson (25)	Roy Hibbert (12)	George, West, & Hill (4)	Bankers Life Fieldhouse; 18,165	4–2

Conference Finals: 3–4 (home: 2–1; road: 1–3)

Game	Date	Team	Score	High points	High rebounds	High assists	Location Attendance	Series
1	May 22	@ Miami	L 102–103 (OT)	Paul George (27)	Lance Stephenson (12)	George Hill (7)	American Airlines Arena; 19,679	0–1
2	May 24	@ Miami	W 97–93	Roy Hibbert (29)	Roy Hibbert (10)	Paul George (6)	American Airlines Arena; 20,022	1–1
3	May 26	Miami	L 96–114	David West (21)	Roy Hibbert (17)	Paul George (8)	Bankers Life Fieldhouse; 18,165	1–2
4	May 28	Miami	W 99–92	Roy Hibbert (23)	West & Hibbert (12)	George Hill (6)	Bankers Life Fieldhouse; 18,165	2–2
5	May 30	@ Miami	L 79–90	Paul George (27)	Paul George (11)	Paul George (5)	American Airlines Arena; 19,913	2–3
6	June 1	Miami	W 91–77	Paul George (28)	David West (14)	George Hill (6)	Bankers Life Fieldhouse; 18,165	3–3
7	June 3	@ Miami	L 76–99	Roy Hibbert (18)	Roy Hibbert (8)	Lance Stephenson (5)	American Airlines Arena; 20,025	3–4

2013 playoff schedule

== Player statistics ==
=== Ragular season ===
Player	POS	GP	GS	MP	REB	AST	STL	BLK	PTS	MPG	RPG	APG	SPG	BPG	PPG
Tyler Hansbrough	PF	81	8	1,366	373	36	29	18	568	16.9	4.6	.4	.4	.2	7.0
Ian Mahinmi	C	80	2	1,322	311	27	39	66	402	16.5	3.9	.3	.5	.8	5.0
Paul George	SF	79	79	2,972	603	327	143	51	1,377	37.6	7.6	4.1	1.8	.6	17.4
Roy Hibbert	C	79	79	2,269	656	113	39	206	937	28.7	8.3	1.4	.5	2.6	11.9
Lance Stephenson	SG	78	72	2,278	304	223	81	16	687	29.2	3.9	2.9	1.0	.2	8.8
George Hill	PG	76	76	2,620	284	355	81	26	1,076	34.5	3.7	4.7	1.1	.3	14.2
D. J. Augustin	PG	76	5	1,226	91	170	34	3	356	16.1	1.2	2.2	.4	.0	4.7
David West	PF	73	73	2,435	563	213	74	69	1,250	33.4	7.7	2.9	1.0	.9	17.1
Gerald Green	SF	60	7	1,080	141	50	19	23	421	18.0	2.4	.8	.3	.4	7.0
Sam Young	SG	56	3	693	123	42	15	8	155	12.4	2.2	.8	.3	.1	2.8
Orlando Johnson	SG	51	0	619	110	47	11	9	203	12.1	2.2	.9	.2	.2	4.0
Jeff Ayres	PF	37	0	369	104	15	6	12	145	10.0	2.8	.4	.2	.3	3.9
Ben Hansbrough	PG	28	0	200	18	21	7	2	57	7.1	.6	.8	.3	.1	2.0
Miles Plumlee	C	14	0	55	22	2	0	3	13	3.9	1.6	.1	.0	.2	.9
Danny Granger	SF	5	0	74	9	3	2	1	27	14.8	1.8	.6	.4	.2	5.4
Dominic McGuire^{†}	SF	2	1	12	2	1	0	0	0	6.0	1.0	.5	.0	.0	.0

- ^{†} Denotes player spent time with another team in the season. Stats reflect time with the Pacers only.

=== Playoffs ===
Player	POS	GP	GS	MP	REB	AST	STL	BLK	PTS	MPG	RPG	APG	SPG	BPG	PPG
Paul George	SF	19	19	780	141	96	25	9	365	41.1	7.4	5.1	1.3	.5	19.2
Roy Hibbert	C	19	19	694	188	26	3	37	323	36.5	9.9	1.4	.2	1.9	17.0
David West	PF	19	19	689	144	39	13	15	302	36.3	7.6	2.1	.7	.8	15.9
Lance Stephenson	SG	19	19	673	144	63	23	2	179	35.4	7.6	3.3	1.2	.1	9.4
D. J. Augustin	PG	19	1	316	15	13	7	0	98	16.6	.8	.7	.4	.0	5.2
Tyler Hansbrough	PF	19	0	241	61	5	6	0	78	12.7	3.2	.3	.3	.0	4.1
George Hill	PG	18	18	685	67	77	22	4	263	38.1	3.7	4.3	1.2	.2	14.6
Ian Mahinmi	C	18	0	150	42	1	0	13	29	8.3	2.3	.1	.0	.7	1.6
Sam Young	SG	15	0	130	29	4	4	1	26	8.7	1.9	.3	.3	.1	1.7
Orlando Johnson	SG	12	0	28	3	1	0	0	10	2.3	.3	.1	.0	.0	.8
Gerald Green	SF	9	0	105	12	3	0	1	55	11.7	1.3	.3	.0	.1	6.1
Jeff Ayres	PF	9	0	71	18	1	0	2	16	7.9	2.0	.1	.0	.2	1.8
Ben Hansbrough	PG	6	0	22	3	3	0	1	0	3.7	.5	.5	.0	.2	.0

== Transactions ==
=== Overview ===
Players added

Via draft

- Orlando Johnson
- Miles Plumlee

Via trade

- Ian Mahinmi

Via free agency

- D. J. Augustin
- Gerald Green
- Ben Hansbrough
- Sam Young
Players Lost

Via trade

- Darren Collison
- Dahntay Jones

Via free agency

- Louis Amundson
- Leandro Barbosa
- Kyrylo Fesenko
- A. J. Price

=== Trades ===
June 28, 2012 (Draft day)	To Indiana Pacers Draft rights to Orlando Johnson	To Sacramento Kings Cash considerations
July 12, 2012	To Indiana Pacers Ian Mahinmi (sign and trade)	To Dallas Mavericks Dahntay Jones; Darren Collison

=== Free agents ===
Additions
Player	Date signed	Former team
D. J. Augustin	July 13	Charlotte Bobcats
Gerald Green	July 13	Brooklyn Nets
Roy Hibbert	July 13	Indiana Pacers (Re-signed)
George Hill	July 13	Indiana Pacers (Re-signed)
Sam Young	September 6	Philadelphia 76ers
Sundiata Gaines	September 6	Brooklyn Nets
Blake Ahearn	September 6	Utah Jazz
Luke Nevill	September 18	Perth Wildcats (Australia)
Ben Hansbrough	September 18	BC Krka (Slovenia)

Subtractions
Player	Reason left	New team
A. J. Price	Free agency	Washington Wizards
Louis Amundson	Free agency	Minnesota Timberwolves
Kyrylo Fesenko	Free agency	Chicago Bulls
Leandro Barbosa	Free agency	Boston Celtics
