= 2012–13 Atlanta Hawks season =

NBA professional basketball team season

- Head coach: Larry Drew
- Owners: Atlanta Spirit LLC
- Arena: Philips Arena

Results
- Record: 44–38 (.537)
- Place: Division: 2nd (Southeast); Conference: 6th (Eastern)
- Playoff finish: First Round (lost to Pacers 2–4)
- Stats at Basketball Reference

Local media
- Television: Fox Sports South, SportSouth
- Radio: WCNN

The 2012–13 Atlanta Hawks season was the 64th season of the franchise in the National Basketball Association (NBA) and 45th in Atlanta. This for the first time since 2004–05 season that Joe Johnson was not on the opening day roster.

== Key dates ==
- June 28: The 2012 NBA draft took place at Prudential Center in Newark, New Jersey.

== Draft picks ==
Round	Pick	Player	Position	Nationality	College
1	23	John Jenkins	Guard	United States	Vanderbilt
2	43	Mike Scott	Forward	United States	Virginia

== Roster ==
2012–13 Atlanta Hawks roster
Players

Pos.	No.	Player	Height	Weight	DOB	From
G	34	Devin Harris	6 ft 3 in (1.91 m)	192 lb (87 kg)	1983–02–27	Wisconsin
F/C	15	Al Horford	6 ft 10 in (2.08 m)	250 lb (113 kg)	1986–06–03	Florida
G	12	John Jenkins	6 ft 4 in (1.93 m)	215 lb (98 kg)	1991–03–06	Vanderbilt
F	44	Ivan Johnson	6 ft 8 in (2.03 m)	255 lb (116 kg)	1984–04–10	Cal State San Bernardino
G/F	30	Dahntay Jones	6 ft 6 in (1.98 m)	225 lb (102 kg)	1980-12-27	Duke
G/F	26	Kyle Korver	6 ft 7 in (2.01 m)	212 lb (96 kg)	1981–03–17	Creighton
G	8	Shelvin Mack	6 ft 3 in (1.91 m)	215 lb (98 kg)	1990–04–22	Butler
F/C	27	Zaza Pachulia	6 ft 11 in (2.11 m)	275 lb (125 kg)	1984–02–10	Georgia
C	10	Johan Petro	7 ft 0 in (2.13 m)	247 lb (112 kg)	1986–01–27	France
F	32	Mike Scott	6 ft 8 in (2.03 m)	237 lb (108 kg)	1988–07–16	Virginia
F	5	Josh Smith	6 ft 9 in (2.06 m)	225 lb (102 kg)	1985–12–05	Oak Hill Academy (VA)
G/F	92	DeShawn Stevenson	6 ft 5 in (1.96 m)	218 lb (99 kg)	1981–04–03	Washington Union High School
G	0	Jeff Teague	6 ft 2 in (1.88 m)	181 lb (82 kg)	1988–06–10	Wake Forest
F	4	Anthony Tolliver	6 ft 8 in (2.03 m)	240 lb (109 kg)	1985–06–01	Creighton
G	3	Louis Williams	6 ft 1 in (1.85 m)	175 lb (79 kg)	1986–10–27	South Gwinnett High School

Coaches
Head coach
- Larry Drew
Assistant(s)
- Lester Conner
- Bob Bender
- Kenny Gattison
- Tyrone Hill
- Pete Radulovic

Legend
- (DP) Unsigned draft pick
- (FA) Free agent
- (S) Suspended
- (DL) On assignment to D-League affiliate
- Injured

Roster
Updated: 2012–12–09

== Pre-season ==
2012 pre-season game log
Pre-season: 3–4 (home: 3–0; road: 0–4)

Game	Date	Team	Score	High points	High rebounds	High assists	Location Attendance	Record
1	October 7	Miami	W 92–79	Josh Smith (21)	Damion James (8)	Jeff Teague (5)	Philips Arena; 12,828	1–0
2	October 10	@ San Antonio	L 99–101	Damion James, Mike Scott (11)	Damion James (8)	Damion James (4)	AT&T Center; 14,123	1–1
3	October 14	@ Memphis	L 102–110	Al Horford (13)	Zaza Pachulia (9)	Jeff Teague (8)	FedExForum; 10,072	1–2
4	October 16	@ Indiana	L 98–102	Louis Williams (18)	Damion James (8)	Jeff Teague (5)	Bankers Life Fieldhouse; 10,786	1–3
5	October 18	New Orleans	W 97–68	Josh Smith (16)	Al Horford (11)	Louis Williams (8)	Philips Arena; 8,563	2–3
6	October 20	Dallas	W 110–94	Mike Scott (17)	Josh Smith (13)	Devin Harris, Louis Williams (6)	Philips Arena; 9,935	3–3
7	October 26	@ Detroit	L 88–104	Louis Williams (17)	Al Horford, Damion James (6)	Devin Harris (5)	The Palace of Auburn Hills; 10,825	3–4

2012–13 season schedule

== Regular season ==
=== Game log ===
2012–13 game log
Total: 44–38 (home: 25–16; road: 19–22)
November: 9–5 (home: 5–3; road: 4–2)

Game	Date	Team	Score	High points	High rebounds	High assists	Location Attendance	Record
1	November 2	Houston	L 102–109	Louis Williams (22)	Josh Smith (10)	Jeff Teague (7)	Philips Arena; 18,238	0–1
2	November 4	@ Oklahoma City	W 104–95	Al Horford (23)	Al Horford (12)	Zaza Pachulia (6)	Chesapeake Energy Arena; 18,203	1-1
3	November 7	Indiana	W 89–86	Al Horford (16)	Zaza Pachulia (14)	Josh Smith (7)	Philips Arena; 10,684	2–1
4	November 9	Miami	L 89–95	Jeff Teague (20)	Josh Smith (8)	Jeff Teague (11)	Philips Arena; 16,785	2-2
5	November 11	@ L. A. Clippers	L 76–89	Josh Smith (13)	Al Horford (9)	Jeff Teague (6)	Staples Center; 19,060	2–3
6	November 12	@ Portland	W 95–87	Josh Smith (19)	Josh Smith (11)	Jeff Teague (8)	Rose Garden; 19,095	3-3
7	November 14	@ Golden State	L 88–92	Louis Williams (18)	Josh Smith (10)	Louis Williams (6)	Oracle Arena; 18,107	3–4
8	November 16	@ Sacramento	W 112–96	Kyle Korver (22)	Al Horford (10)	Josh Smith (6)	Sleep Train Arena; 11,814	4-4
9	November 19	Orlando	W 81–72	Al Horford (15)	Zaza Pachulia (11)	Jeff Teague (7)	Philips Arena; 15,066	5–4
10	November 21	Washington	W 101–100	Josh Smith (25)	Josh Smith (12)	Al Horford (10)	Philips Arena; 11,338	6–4
11	November 23	@ Charlotte	W 101–91	Al Horford (26)	Al Horford (13)	Jeff Teague (12)	Time Warner Cable Arena; 17,868	7–4
12	November 24	L. A. Clippers	W 104–93	Pachulia & Teague (19)	Zaza Pachulia (12)	Jeff Teague (11)	Philips Arena; 16,024	8–4
13	November 28	Charlotte	W 94–91	Horford & Smith & Williams (17)	Josh Smith (13)	Horford & Smith (6)	Philips Arena; 10,162	9–4
14	November 30	Cleveland	L 111–113	Josh Smith (25)	Al Horford (11)	Jeff Teague (7)	Philips Arena; 13,094	9–5

December : 10–5 (home: 6–2; road: 4–3)

Game	Date	Team	Score	High points	High rebounds	High assists	Location Attendance	Record
15	December 5	Denver	W 108–104	Al Horford (25)	Josh Smith (13)	Louis Williams (6)	Philips Arena; 14,101	10–5
16	December 7	Washington	W 104–95	Josh Smith (23)	Josh Smith (15)	Teague & Harris (6)	Philips Arena; 13,067	11–5
17	December 8	@ Memphis	W 93–83	Josh Smith (24)	Al Horford (14)	Jeff Teague (6)	FedExForum; 17,612	12–5
18	December 10	@ Miami	L 92–101	Josh Smith (22)	Al Horford (11)	Josh Smith (6)	American Airlines Arena; 19,600	12–6
19	December 12	@ Orlando	W 86–80	Smith & Teague (16)	Al Horford (13)	Al Horford (4)	Amway Center; 16,992	13–6
20	December 13	Charlotte	W 113–90	Devin Harris (20)	Ivan Johnson (8)	Louis Williams (9)	Philips Arena; 13,090	14–6
21	December 15	Golden State	L 93–115	Al Horford (17)	Horford & Johnson (9)	Jeff Teague (8)	Philips Arena; 15,145	14–7
22	December 18	@ Washington	W 100–95	Louis Williams (24)	Josh Smith (13)	Horford & Teague (6)	Verizon Center; 15,123	15–7
23	December 19	Oklahoma City	L 92–100	Jeff Teague (19)	Josh Smith (12)	Jeff Teague (9)	Philips Arena; 16,284	15–8
24	December 21	@ Philadelphia	L 80–99	Josh Smith (17)	Horford & Pachulia (8)	Louis Williams (4)	Wells Fargo Center; 18,061	15–9
25	December 22	Chicago	W 92–75	Al Horford (20)	Al Horford (10)	Jeff Teague (8)	Philips Arena; 17,782	16–9
26	December 26	Detroit	W 126–119	Josh Smith (31)	Horford & Smith (10)	Jeff Teague (11)	Philips Arena; 15,182	17–9
27	December 28	@ Cleveland	W 102–94	Jeff Teague (27)	Al Horford (11)	Jeff Teague (8)	Quicken Loans Arena; 19,443	18–9
28	December 29	Indiana	W 109–100	Louis Williams (21)	Zaza Pachulia (14)	Louis Williams (12)	Philips Arena; 16,558	19–9
29	December 31	@ Houston	L 104–123	Louis Williams (21)	Al Horford (13)	Jeff Teague (9)	Toyota Center; 18,160	19–10

January : 7–9 (home: 5–2; road: 2–7)

Game	Date	Team	Score	High points	High rebounds	High assists	Location Attendance	Record
30	January 1	@ New Orleans	W 95–86	Josh Smith (23)	Josh Smith (13)	Jeff Teague (8)	New Orleans Arena; 12,712	20–10
31	January 4	@ Detroit	L 84–85	Josh Smith (20)	Al Horford (15)	Jeff Teague (9)	The Palace of Auburn Hills; 14,832	20–11
32	January 5	Boston	W 89–81	Louis Williams (28)	Josh Smith (10)	Josh Smith (5)	Philips Arena; 19,159	20–12
33	January 8	@ Minnesota	L 103–108	Williams & Smith (21)	Josh Smith (13)	Louis Williams (8)	Target Center; 15,988	20–13
34	January 9	@ Cleveland	L 83–99	Josh Smith (17)	Zaza Pachulia (10)	Jeff Teague (8)	Quicken Loans Arena; 13,149	20–14
35	January 11	Utah	W 103–95	Devin Harris (24)	Josh Smith (10)	Josh Smith (6)	Philips Arena; 12,064	21–14
36	January 12	@ Washington	L 83–93	Jeff Teague (19)	Al Horford (12)	Devin Harris (5)	Verizon Center; 15,331	21–15
37	January 14	@ Chicago	L 58–97	Mike Scott (10)	Al Horford (11)	Jeff Teague (5)	United Center; 21,430	21–16
38	January 16	Brooklyn	W 109–95	Jeff Teague (28)	Al Horford (13)	Jeff Teague (11)	Philips Arena; 15,029	22–16
39	January 18	@ Brooklyn	L 89–94	Jeff Teague (21)	Josh Smith (9)	Jeff Teague (10)	Barclays Center; 17,732	22–17
40	January 19	San Antonio	L 93–98	Josh Smith (21)	Al Horford (15)	Jeff Teague (8)	Philips Arena; 18,255	22–18
41	January 21	Minnesota	W 104–96	Al Horford (28)	Al Horford (10)	Jeff Teague (10)	Philips Arena; 13,808	23–18
42	January 23	@ Charlotte	W 104–92	Josh Smith (30)	Ivan Johnson (15)	Josh Smith (8)	Time Warner Cable Arena; 12,534	24–18
43	January 25	Boston	W 123–111	Kyle Korver (27)	Josh Smith (14)	Teague & Smith (7)	Philips Arena; 15,595	25–18
44	January 27	@ New York	L 104–106	Jeff Teague (27)	Kyle Korver (7)	Jeff Teague (6)	Madison Square Garden; 19,033	25–19
45	January 30	Toronto	W 93–92	Al Horford (22)	Josh Smith (11)	Jeff Teague (7)	Philips Arena; 12,021	26–19

February : 7–4 (home: 2–3; road: 5–1)

Game	Date	Team	Score	High points	High rebounds	High assists	Location Attendance	Record
46	February 2	Chicago	L 76–93	Josh Smith (19)	Josh Smith (13)	Josh Smith (5)	Philips Arena; 17,898	26–20
47	February 5	@ Indiana	L 103–114	Jeff Teague (24)	Josh Smith (10)	Teague & Korver (8)	Bankers Life Fieldhouse; 12,578	26–21
48	February 6	Memphis	W 103–92	Jeff Teague (22)	Horford & Smith (11)	Jeff Teague (13)	Philips Arena; 13,198	27–21
49	February 8	New Orleans	L 100–111	Josh Smith (23)	Horford & Smith (6)	Jeff Teague (9)	Philips Arena; 14,022	27–22
50	February 11	@ Dallas	W 105–101	Josh Smith (26)	Josh Smith (13)	Jeff Teague (9)	American Airlines Center; 19,654	28–22
51	February 13	@ Orlando	W 108–76	Josh Smith (30)	Al Horford (12)	Jeff Teague (11)	Amway Center; 17,649	29–22
All-Star Break
52	February 20	Miami	L 90–103	Al Horford (27)	Horford & Smith (9)	Josh Smith (9)	Philips Arena; 18,238	29–23
53	February 22	Sacramento	W 122–108	Al Horford (24)	Al Horford (8)	Jeff Teague (12)	Philips Arena; 15,031	30–23
54	February 23	@ Milwaukee	W 103–102	Al Horford (23)	Josh Smith (13)	Jeff Teague (9)	BMO Harris Bradley Center; 18,289	31–23
55	February 25	@ Detroit	W 114–103	Horford & Smith (23)	Al Horford (22)	Jeff Teague (12)	The Palace of Auburn Hills; 12,417	32-23
56	February 27	@ Utah	W 102–91	Al Horford (34)	Al Horford (15)	Josh Smith (7)	EnergySolutions Arena; 19,267	33–23

March : 8–10 (home: 5–3; road: 3–7)

Game	Date	Team	Score	High points	High rebounds	High assists	Location Attendance	Record
57	March 1	@ Phoenix	L 87–92	Al Horford (20)	Josh Smith (10)	Devin Harris (6)	US Airways Center; 15,269	33–24
58	March 3	@ L. A. Lakers	L 98–99	Al Horford (24)	Josh Smith (7)	Josh Smith (7)	Staples Center; 18,997	33–25
59	March 4	@ Denver	L 88–104	Al Horford (18)	Al Horford (13)	Jeff Teague (8)	Pepsi Center; 17,554	33–26
60	March 6	Philadelphia	W 107–96	Jeff Teague (27)	Al Horford (12)	Jeff Teague (11)	Philips Arena; 13,018	34–26
61	March 8	@ Boston	L 102–107 (OT)	Josh Smith (32)	Al Horford (13)	Smith & Teague (9)	TD Garden; 18,624	34–27
62	March 9	Brooklyn	L 80–93	Al Horford (15)	Al Horford (12)	Devin Harris (9)	Philips Arena; 17,282	34–28
63	March 12	@ Miami	L 81–98	Josh Smith (15)	Josh Smith (6)	Jeff Teague (4)	American Airlines Arena; 20,350	34–29
64	March 13	L. A. Lakers	W 96–92	Devin Harris (17)	Al Horford (14)	Devin Harris (7)	Philips Arena; 19,163	35–29
65	March 15	Phoenix	W 107–94	Josh Smith (17)	Horford & Smith (11)	Josh Smith (7)	Philips Arena; 14,282	36–29
66	March 17	@ Brooklyn	W 105–93	Al Horford (22)	Al Horford (11)	Jeff Teague (15)	Barclays Center; 17,732	37–29
67	March 18	Dallas	L 113–127	Jeff Teague (19)	Al Horford (11)	Jeff Teague (7)	Philips Arena; 14,505	37–30
68	March 20	Milwaukee	W 98–90	Jeff Teague (27)	Al Horford (16)	Jeff Teague (11)	Philips Arena; 11,920	38–30
69	March 22	Portland	L 93–104	Josh Smith (24)	Al Horford (17)	Jeff Teague (7)	Philips Arena; 16,348	38–31
70	March 24	@ Milwaukee	W 104–99	Al Horford (24)	Josh Smith (9)	Jeff Teague (8)	BMO Harris Bradley Center; 17,587	39–31
71	March 25	@ Indiana	L 94–100	Josh Smith (20)	Al Horford (8)	Josh Smith (4)	Bankers Life Fieldhouse; 14,336	39–32
72	March 27	@ Toronto	W 107–88	Al Horford (26)	Al Horford (12)	Jeff Teague (13)	Air Canada Centre; 18,206	40–32
73	March 29	@ Boston	L 107–118	Mike Scott (19)	Johan Petro (7)	Shelvin Mack (9)	TD Garden; 18,624	40–33
74	March 30	Orlando	W 97–88	Josh Smith (21)	Devin Harris (10)	Devin Harris (6)	Philips Arena; 17,152	41–33

April : 3–5 (home: 2–3; road: 1–2)

Game	Date	Team	Score	High points	High rebounds	High assists	Location Attendance	Record
75	April 1	Cleveland	W 102–94	Devin Harris (25)	Josh Smith (14)	Jeff Teague (9)	Philips Arena; 13,026	42–33
76	April 3	New York	L 82–95	Kyle Korver (25)	Josh Smith (8)	Jeff Teague (9)	Philips Arena; 17,404	42–34
77	April 5	Philadelphia	L 90–101	Josh Smith (19)	Al Horford (10)	Jeff Teague (9)	Philips Arena; 17,020	42–35
78	April 6	@ San Antonio	L 97–99	John Jenkins (23)	Johan Petro (15)	Shelvin Mack (8)	AT&T Center; 18,581	42–36
79	April 10	@ Philadelphia	W 124–101	Josh Smith (28)	Josh Smith (12)	Jeff Teague (11)	Wells Fargo Center; 17,178	43–36
80	April 12	Milwaukee	W 109–104	Josh Smith (24)	Al Horford (17)	Jeff Teague (10)	Philips Arena; 16,908	44–36
81	April 16	Toronto	L 96–113	Kyle Korver (13)	Mike Scott (12)	Jeff Teague (9)	Philips Arena; 15,200	44–37
82	April 17	@ New York	L 92–98	Mike Scott (23)	Mike Scott (14)	Shelvin Mack (4)	Madison Square Garden; 19,033	44–38

2012–13 season schedule

=== Standings ===
Southeast Division	W	L	PCT	GB	Home	Road	Div	GP
z-Miami Heat	66	16	.805	–	37–4	29–12	15–1	82
x-Atlanta Hawks	44	38	.537	22	25–16	19–22	11–5	82
Washington Wizards	29	53	.354	37	22–19	7–34	5–11	82
Charlotte Bobcats	21	61	.256	45	15–26	6–35	6–10	82
Orlando Magic	20	62	.244	46	12–29	8–33	3–13	82

Eastern Conference
#	Team	W	L	PCT	GB	GP
1	z-Miami Heat *	66	16	.805	–	82
2	y-New York Knicks *	54	28	.659	12.0	82
3	y-Indiana Pacers *	49	32	.605	16.5	81
4	x-Brooklyn Nets	49	33	.598	17.0	82
5	x-Chicago Bulls	45	37	.549	21.0	82
6	x-Atlanta Hawks	44	38	.537	22.0	82
7	x-Boston Celtics	41	40	.506	24.5	81
8	x-Milwaukee Bucks	38	44	.463	28.0	82
9	Philadelphia 76ers	34	48	.415	32.0	82
10	Toronto Raptors	34	48	.415	32.0	82
11	Washington Wizards	29	53	.354	37.0	82
12	Detroit Pistons	29	53	.354	37.0	82
13	Cleveland Cavaliers	24	58	.293	42.0	82
14	Charlotte Bobcats	21	61	.256	45.0	82
15	Orlando Magic	20	62	.244	46.0	82

== Playoffs ==
2013 playoff game log
First Round: 2–4 (home: 2–1; road: 0–3)

Game	Date	Team	Score	High points	High rebounds	High assists	Location Attendance	Series
1	April 21	@ Indiana	L 90–107	Jeff Teague (21)	Josh Smith (8)	Jeff Teague (7)	Bankers Life Fieldhouse; 18,165	0–1
2	April 24	@ Indiana	L 98–113	Devin Harris (17)	Al Horford (10)	Jeff Teague (5), Devin Harris (5)	Bankers Life Fieldhouse; 18,165	0–2
3	April 27	Indiana	W 90–69	Al Horford (26)	Al Horford (16)	Josh Smith (6)	Philips Arena; 18,238	1–2
4	April 29	Indiana	W 102–91	Josh Smith (29)	Josh Smith (11)	Jeff Teague (6), Devin Harris (6)	Philips Arena; 18,241	2–2
5	May 1	@ Indiana	L 83–106	Smith & Horford (14)	Al Horford (9)	Jeff Teague (5)	Bankers Life Fieldhouse; 18,165	2–3
6	May 3	Indiana	L 73–81	Al Horford (15)	Josh Smith (9)	Smith, Horford, & Harris (3)	Philips Arena; 18,238	2–4

2013 playoff schedule

== Player statistics ==
Legend
GP	Games played	GS	Games started	MPG	Minutes per game
FG%	Field-goal percentage	3P%	3-point field-goal percentage	FT%	Free-throw percentage
RPG	Rebounds per game	APG	Assists per game	SPG	Steals per game
BPG	Blocks per game	PPG	Points per game

=== Regular season ===
Player	GP	GS	MPG	FG%	3P%	FT%	RPG	APG	SPG	BPG	PPG
Devin Harris	58	34	24.5	.438	.335	.730	2.0	3.4	1.10	.22	9.9
Al Horford	74	74	37.2	.543	.500	.640	10.2	3.2	1.05	1.05	17.4
John Jenkins	61	2	14.8	.446	.384	.840	1.5	0.9	.20	.16	6.1
Kyle Korver	74	60	30.5	.461	.457	.860	4.0	2.0	.95	.50	10.9
Shelvin Mack	20	1	13.4	0	0	0	0	0	0	0	5.2
Anthony Morrow	24	1	12.5	.423	.395	.890	1.1	0.4	.50	.04	5.2
Zaza Pachulia	52	15	21.8	.473	.000	.760	6.5	1.5	.67	.23	5.9
Johan Petro	31	8	11.4	.436	.250	.920	3.6	0.5	.32	.29	3.5
Mike Scott	40	1	9.4	.476	.000	.770	2.8	0.3	.10	.05	4.6
Josh Smith	76	76	35.3	.465	.303	.520	8.4	4.2	1.24	1.79	17.5
DeShawn Stevenson	56	31	20.7	.374	.364	.520	2.2	0.9	.52	.11	5.1
Anthony Tolliver	24	1	15.5	0	0	0	0	0	0	0	4.1
Jeff Teague	80	78	32.9	0	0	0	0	0	0	0	14.6
Louis Williams	39	9	28.7	0	0	0	0	0	0	0	14.1
Jannero Pargo	7	0	16.1	0	0	0	0	0	0	0	5.0
Dahntay Jones	28	4	13.6	0	0	0	0	0	0	0	3.1

=== Playoffs ===
Player	GP	GS	MPG	FG%	3P%	FT%	RPG	APG	SPG	BPG	PPG
Devin Harris	6	6	37.5	.365	.200	.680	2.8	3.7	1.7	.2	11.3
Al Horford	6	6	36.3	.494		.667	8.8	3.0	1.0	.8	16.7
Jeff Teague	6	6	35.5	.333	.300	.821	2.8	5.0	1.5	.3	13.3
Josh Smith	6	6	33.2	.433	.250	.528	7.5	3.5	1.8	.5	17.0
Johan Petro	6	4	16.8	.519		.500	3.7	.7	.2	.7	4.8
Kyle Korver	6	2	29.5	.388	.353	.917	3.3	.7	.3	.7	10.2
Ivan Johnson	6	0	18.0	.462		.667	3.3	.5	.7	.5	6.0
Anthony Tolliver	6	0	11.3	.571	.636	.333	1.5	.2	.2	.2	4.0
Dahntay Jones	5	0	3.8	.250		1.000	.2	.0	.0	.0	.8
DeShawn Stevenson	4	0	11.3	.600	.600		2.5	.3	.0	.0	2.3
John Jenkins	4	0	6.0	.000	.000		.5	.8	.0	.0	.0
Shelvin Mack	4	0	5.5	.444	.400		1.8	1.8	.0	.0	2.5
Mike Scott	4	0	5.0	.500	.000	.750	1.8	.3	.0	.0	3.3

== Transactions ==
Players Added

Via draft

- John Jenkins
- Mike Scott

Via free agency

- James Anderson
- Keith Benson ^{[a]}
- Damion James
- Carldell Johnson ^{[a]}
- Isma'il Muhammad ^{[a]}
- Anthony Tolliver
- Louis Williams

Via trade

- Devin Harris
- Kyle Korver
- Anthony Morrow
- Jordan Farmar
- Jordan Williams
- Johan Petro
- DeShawn Stevenson
Players Lost

Via trade

- Joe Johnson
- Marvin Williams

Via free agency

- Jason Collins
- Kirk Hinrich
- Jannero Pargo
- Vladimir Radmanović
- Jerry Stackhouse

Waived

- Jordan Farmar
- Jordan Williams

- ^{a} Cut from the roster during training camp.

=== Trades ===
July 11, 2012	To Atlanta Hawks DeShawn Stevenson (sign and trade); Johan Petro; Jordan Farmar; Anthony Morrow; Jordan Williams; 2013 first-round pick 2017 second-round pick	To Brooklyn Nets Joe Johnson
July 11, 2012	To Atlanta Hawks Devin Harris	To Utah Jazz Marvin Williams
July 16, 2012	To Atlanta Hawks Kyle Korver	To Chicago Bulls Cash considerations
July 30, 2012	To Atlanta Hawks Draft rights to Sofoklis Schortsanitis	To Los Angeles Clippers Willie Green(sign and trade)

=== Free Agency ===
Additions
Player	Date signed	Former team
Louis Williams	July 12	Philadelphia 76ers
Ivan Johnson	September 18	Atlanta Hawks (re-signed)
Anthony Tolliver	September 27	Minnesota Timberwolves
Keith Benson	September 27	Golden State Warriors
Damion James	September 27	Brooklyn Nets
James Anderson	September 27	San Antonio Spurs
Carldell Johnson	September 27	Austin Toros (D-League)
Isma'il Muhammad	October 1	Auckland Pirates (New Zealand)

Subtractions
Player	Date signed	New Team
Jerry Stackhouse	July 16	Brooklyn Nets
Vladimir Radmanović	July 19	Chicago Bulls
Kirk Hinrich	July 23	Chicago Bulls
Jason Collins	July 31	Boston Celtics
Jannero Pargo	October 1	Washington Wizards

== See also ==
2012–13 NBA season
