= 2012–13 Charlotte Bobcats season =

NBA professional basketball team season

- Head coach: Mike Dunlap
- President: Rod Higgins
- General manager: Rich Cho
- Owner: Michael Jordan
- Arena: Time Warner Cable Arena

Results
- Record: 21–61 (.256)
- Place: Division: 4th (Southeast); Conference: 14th (Eastern)
- Playoff finish: Did not qualify
- Stats at Basketball Reference

Local media
- Television: Fox Sports Carolinas, SportSouth
- Radio: WFNZ

The 2012–13 Charlotte Bobcats season was the 23rd season of NBA basketball in Charlotte, and their ninth as the Charlotte Bobcats. Charlotte started out this season by getting a close 90–89 win over the Indiana Pacers to end a 23-game losing streak that started at the end of their previous season and finished the season on a three-game winning streak, and the team's 21–61 record was enough to finish fourth in the Southeast division for the eighth time in nine seasons. The Bobcats tripled their win total from the prior lockout-shortened season, and showed signs of genuine improvement.

== Key dates ==
- June 28, 2012: The 2012 NBA draft took place at the Prudential Center in Newark, New Jersey.
- November 10, 2012: This day marks the first time in Charlotte Bobcats history that they defeated the Dallas Mavericks.

== Draft picks ==
Round	Pick	Player	Nationality	Position	School/Club team
1	2	Michael Kidd-Gilchrist	United States	SF	Kentucky (Fr.)
2	31	Jeffery Taylor	Sweden	SF	Vanderbilt (Sr.)

== Roster ==
2012–13 Charlotte Bobcats roster
Players

Pos.	No.	Player	Height	Weight	DOB	From
F	4	Jeff Adrien	6 ft 7 in (2.01 m)	243 lb (110 kg)	1986–02–10	Connecticut
F/C	0	Bismack Biyombo	6 ft 9 in (2.06 m)	245 lb (111 kg)	1992–08–28	DR Congo
C	2	DeSagana Diop	7 ft 0 in (2.13 m)	280 lb (127 kg)	1982–01–30	Oak Hill Academy (VA)
G	8	Ben Gordon	6 ft 3 in (1.91 m)	200 lb (91 kg)	1983–04–04	Connecticut
C	33	Brendan Haywood	7 ft 0 in (2.13 m)	263 lb (119 kg)	1979–11–27	North Carolina
G/F	9	Gerald Henderson	6 ft 5 in (1.96 m)	215 lb (98 kg)	1987–12–09	Duke
F	14	Michael Kidd-Gilchrist	6 ft 7 in (2.01 m)	232 lb (105 kg)	1993–09–26	Kentucky
F/C	11	Josh McRoberts	6 ft 10 in (2.08 m)	240 lb (109 kg)	1987–02–28	Duke
F/C	22	Byron Mullens	7 ft 0 in (2.13 m)	275 lb (125 kg)	1989–02–14	Ohio State
G	5	Jannero Pargo	6 ft 1 in (1.85 m)	185 lb (84 kg)	1979-10-22	Arkansas
G	7	Ramon Sessions	6 ft 3 in (1.91 m)	190 lb (86 kg)	1986–04–11	Nevada
G/F	44	Jeffery Taylor	6 ft 7 in (2.01 m)	225 lb (102 kg)	1989–05–23	Vanderbilt
F	12	Tyrus Thomas	6 ft 10 in (2.08 m)	225 lb (102 kg)	1986–08–17	LSU
G	15	Kemba Walker	6 ft 1 in (1.85 m)	184 lb (83 kg)	1990–05–08	Connecticut
G/F	55	Reggie Williams	6 ft 6 in (1.98 m)	205 lb (93 kg)	1986–09–14	VMI

Coaches
Head coach
- Mike Dunlap
Assistant(s)
- Brian Winters
- Dan Leibovitz
- Stephen Silas
- Rick Brunson

Legend
- (DP) Unsigned draft pick
- (FA) Free agent
- (S) Suspended
- (DL) On assignment to D-League affiliate
- Injured

Roster
Updated: 2012–12–09

== Pre-season ==
2012 pre-season game log
Pre-season: 1–7 (home: 1–3; road: 0–4)

Game	Date	Team	Score	High points	High rebounds	High assists	Location Attendance	Record
1	October 7	Washington	W 100–88	Gerald Henderson Jr. (19)	Byron Mullens (8)	Ramon Sessions (5)	Time Warner Cable Arena; 6,213	1–0
2	October 9	@ New Orleans	L 82–97	Ben Gordon (15)	DeSagana Diop (8)	Ramon Sessions (6)	New Orleans Arena; 9,264	1–1
3	October 11	New Orleans	L 87–90	Ben Gordon, Byron Mullens (15)	Brendan Haywood, Byron Mullens (5)	Gerald Henderson Jr., Ramon Sessions (4)	Time Warner Cable Arena; 6,596	1–2
4	October 16	@ Oklahoma City	L 98–120	Ben Gordon (21)	Bismack Biyombo (6)	Ramon Sessions (7)	Chesapeake Energy Arena; 18,203	1–3
5	October 20	@ Detroit	L 80–85	Kemba Walker (15)	Tyrus Thomas (16)	Ramon Sessions (6)	The Palace of Auburn Hills; 9,923	1–4
6	October 23	Miami	L 92–98	Ramon Sessions, Kemba Walker (24)	Kemba Walker (6)	Gerald Henderson Jr., Kemba Walker (4)	PNC Arena; 17,924	1–5
7	October 25	Milwaukee	L 90–100	Kemba Walker (20)	Brendan Haywood (13)	Kemba Walker (7)	Time Warner Cable Arena; 19,077	1–6
8	October 26	@ Dallas	L 82–99	Gerald Henderson Jr. (17)	Byron Mullens (19)	Ramon Sessions (4)	American Airlines Center; 19,239	1–7

2012–13 season schedule

== Regular season ==
=== Game log ===
2012–13 game log
Total: 21–61 (Home: 15–26; Road: 6–35)
November: 7–8 (home: 5–4; road: 2–4)

Game	Date	Team	Score	High points	High rebounds	High assists	Location Attendance	Record
1	November 2	Indiana	W 90–89	Kemba Walker (30)	Brendan Haywood (9)	Ramon Sessions (4)	Time Warner Cable Arena; 19,124	1–0
2	November 3	@ Dallas	L 99–126	Ramon Sessions (22)	Brendan Haywood (11)	Sessions & Walker (5)	American Airlines Center; 19,490	1–1
3	November 7	Phoenix	L 110–117	Byron Mullens (24)	Kidd-Gilchrist & Mullens (8)	Ramon Sessions (9)	Time Warner Cable Arena; 13,905	1–2
4	November 9	@ New Orleans	L 99–107	Ben Gordon (34)	Bismack Biyombo (13)	Kemba Walker (6)	New Orleans Arena; 12,668	1–3
5	November 10	Dallas	W 101–97	Kemba Walker (26)	Byron Mullens (14)	Kemba Walker (7)	Time Warner Cable Arena; 15,763	2–3
6	November 13	Washington	W 92–76	Ramon Sessions (21)	Brendan Haywood (11)	Mullens & Taylor (4)	Time Warner Cable Arena; 11,139	3–3
7	November 14	@ Minnesota	W 89–87	Kemba Walker (22)	Byron Mullens (15)	Kemba Walker (5)	Target Center; 13,272	4–3
8	November 17	Memphis	L 87–94	Byron Mullens (18)	Byron Mullens (9)	Kemba Walker (8)	Time Warner Cable Arena; 16,541	4–4
9	November 19	Milwaukee	W 102–98	Ramon Sessions (23)	Brendan Haywood (11)	Kidd-Gilchrist, Sessions, Taylor & Walker (4)	Time Warner Cable Arena; 11,248	5–4
10	November 21	Toronto	W 98–97	Kemba Walker (19)	Biyombo & Mullens (8)	Kemba Walker (7)	Time Warner Cable Arena; 15,240	6–4
11	November 23	Atlanta	L 91–101	Ramon Sessions (22)	Byron Mullens (8)	Kemba Walker (9)	Time Warner Cable Arena; 17,868	6–5
12	November 24	@ Washington	W 108–106	Byron Mullens (8)	Kidd-Gilchrist & Mullens (8)	Kemba Walker (8)	Verizon Center; 13,077	7–5
13	November 26	@ Oklahoma City	L 69–114	Jeffery Taylor (10)	DeSagana Diop (9)	Cory Higgins (3)	Chesapeake Energy Arena; 18,203	7–6
14	November 28	@ Atlanta	L 91–94	Ben Gordon (26)	Brendan Haywood (11)	Ramon Sessions (8)	Philips Arena; 10,162	7–7
15	November 30	Philadelphia	L 98–104	Ben Gordon (19)	Michael Kidd-Gilchrist (8)	Kemba Walker (9)	Time Warner Cable Arena; 13,202	7–8

December : 1–15 (home: 0–8; road: 1–7)

Game	Date	Team	Score	High points	High rebounds	High assists	Location Attendance	Record
16	December 3	Portland	L 112–118	Ben Gordon (29)	Byron Mullens (12)	Ramon Sessions (9)	Time Warner Cable Arena; 12,640	7–9
17	December 5	New York	L 98–100	Kemba Walker (25)	Bismack Biyombo (12)	Kemba Walker (11)	Time Warner Cable Arena; 18,097	7–10
18	December 7	@ Milwaukee	L 93–108	Gerald Henderson Jr. (19)	Michael Kidd-Gilchrist (11)	Kemba Walker (6)	BMO Harris Bradley Center; 13,371	7–11
19	December 8	San Antonio	L 102–132	Kemba Walker (23)	Bismack Biyombo (8)	Michael Kidd-Gilchrist (6)	Time Warner Cable Arena; 17,321	7–12
20	December 10	Golden State	L 96–104	Kemba Walker (24)	Bismack Biyombo (11)	Sessions & Walker (24)	Time Warner Cable Arena; 13,169	7–13
21	December 12	L.A. Clippers	L 94–100	Byron Mullens (19)	Bismack Biyombo (9)	Kemba Walker (6)	Time Warner Cable Arena; 16,786	7–14
22	December 13	@ Atlanta	L 90–113	Gerald Henderson Jr. (17)	Biyombo & Kidd-Gilchrist (6)	Kemba Walker (6)	Philips Arena; 13,090	7–15
23	December 15	Orlando	L 98–107	Kemba Walker (32)	Bismack Biyombo (9)	Kemba Walker (7)	Time Warner Cable Arena; 16,217	7–16
24	December 18	@ L.A. Lakers	L 100–101	Kemba Walker (28)	Byron Mullens (17)	Kemba Walker (7)	Staples Center; 18,997	7–17
25	December 19	@ Phoenix	L 104–121	Kemba Walker (27)	Michael Kidd-Gilchrist (12)	Kemba Walker (6)	US Airways Center; 13,308	7–18
26	December 21	@ Golden State	L 100–115	Gerald Henderson Jr. (23)	Bismack Biyombo (14)	Kemba Walker (6)	Oracle Arena; 19,596	7–19
27	December 22	@ Denver	L 88–110	Ramon Sessions (23)	Byron Mullens (14)	Mullens & Walker (4)	Pepsi Center; 17,555	7–20
28	December 26	Miami	L 92–105	Kemba Walker (27)	Bismack Biyombo (10)	Kemba Walker (6)	Time Warner Cable Arena; 19,602	7–21
29	December 28	@ Brooklyn	L 81–97	Hakim Warrick (13)	Brendan Haywood (8)	Gerald Henderson Jr. (4)	Barclays Center; 17,732	7–22
30	December 29	New Orleans	L 95–98	Michael Kidd-Gilchrist (22)	Hakim Warrick (10)	Kemba Walker (9)	Time Warner Cable Arena; 18,110	7–23
31	December 31	@ Chicago	W 91–81	Kemba Walker (18)	Bismack Biyombo (11)	Kemba Walker (6)	United Center; 21,986	8–23

January : 3–11 (home: 1–6; road: 2–5)

Game	Date	Team	Score	High points	High rebounds	High assists	Location Attendance	Record
32	January 4	Cleveland	L 104–106	Ben Gordon (27)	Michael Kidd-Gilchrist (9)	Ramon Sessions (6)	Time Warner Cable Arena; 15,576	8–24
33	January 6	@ Detroit	W 108–101	Kemba Walker (20)	Bismack Biyombo (17)	Kemba Walker (7)	The Palace of Auburn Hills; 11,963	9–24
34	January 9	Utah	L 102–112	Ben Gordon (20)	Kidd-Gilchrist & Warrick (8)	Kemba Walker (6)	Time Warner Cable Arena; 13,347	9–25
35	January 11	@ Toronto	L 78–99	Gordon, Kidd-Gilchrist & Walker (12)	Jeff Adrien (9)	Sessions & Williams (3)	Air Canada Centre; 14,373	9–26
36	January 12	@ Indiana	L 88–96	Ben Gordon (21)	Michael Kidd-Gilchrist (8)	Ramon Sessions (6)	Bankers Life Fieldhouse; 13,656	9–27
37	January 14	@ Boston	L 89–100	Sessions & Warrick (16)	Michael Kidd-Gilchrist (8)	Kemba Walker (4)	TD Garden; 18,624	9–28
38	January 15	Indiana	L 76–103	Gerald Henderson Jr. (15)	Adrien & Biyombo (6)	Gerald Henderson Jr. (3)	Time Warner Cable Arena; 12,996	9–29
39	January 18	@ Orlando	W 106–100	Kemba Walker (25)	Kemba Walker (8)	Ramon Sessions (7)	Amway Center; 17,598	10–29
40	January 19	Sacramento	L 93–97	Ramon Sessions (16)	Brendan Haywood (7)	Kemba Walker (10)	Time Warner Cable Arena; 17,012	10–30
41	January 21	Houston	L 94–100	Kemba Walker (35)	Bismack Biyombo (9)	Kemba Walker (5)	Time Warner Cable Arena; 16,108	10–31
42	January 23	Atlanta	L 92–104	Ramon Sessions (27)	Bismack Biyombo (10)	Sessions & Walker (5)	Time Warner Cable Arena; 12,534	10–32
43	January 26	Minnesota	W 102–101	Kemba Walker (25)	Bismack Biyombo (13)	Kemba Walker (8)	Time Warner Cable Arena; 15,397	11–32
44	January 28	@ Chicago	L 85–93	Gordon & Walker (18)	Jeff Adrien (10)	Kemba Walker (6)	United Center; 21,308	11–33
45	January 30	@ San Antonio	L 78–102	Ramon Sessions (20)	Adrien & Walker (6)	Taylor & Walker (4)	AT&T Center; 18,581	11–34

February : 2–10 (home: 1–4; road: 1–6)

Game	Date	Team	Score	High points	High rebounds	High assists	Location Attendance	Record
46	February 2	@ Houston	L 95–109	Kemba Walker (24)	Jeff Adrien (7)	Ramon Sessions (6)	Toyota Center; 15,494	11–35
47	February 4	@ Miami	L 94–99	Ramon Sessions (18)	Biyombo & Mullens (9)	Ben Gordon (4)	American Airlines Arena; 19,600	11–36
48	February 6	@ Cleveland	L 95–122	Byron Mullens (15)	Bismack Biyombo (8)	Kemba Walker (4)	Quicken Loans Arena; 13,264	11–37
49	February 8	L.A. Lakers	L 93–100	Henderson & Mullens (20)	Byron Mullens (12)	Kemba Walker (8)	Time Warner Cable Arena; 19,624	11–38
50	February 9	@ Philadelphia	L 76–87	Ramon Sessions (20)	Biyombo & Haywood (7)	Sessions & Walker (4)	Wells Fargo Center; 15,048	11–39
51	February 11	Boston	W 94–91	Byron Mullens (25)	Byron Mullens (18)	Kemba Walker (6)	Time Warner Cable Arena; 15,709	12–39
52	February 13	@ Indiana	L 77–101	Byron Mullens (19)	Bismack Biyombo (16)	Kemba Walker (6)	Bankers Life Fieldhouse; 11,707	12–40
All-Star Break
53	February 19	@ Orlando	W 105–92	Henderson & Walker (24)	Byron Mullens (12)	Kemba Walker (7)	Amway Center; 17,037	13–40
54	February 20	Detroit	L 99–105	Kemba Walker (24)	Bismack Biyombo (8)	Ramon Sessions (8)	Time Warner Cable Arena; 13,112	13–41
55	February 22	Chicago	L 75–105	Kemba Walker (27)	Bismack Biyombo (12)	Byron Mullens (3)	Time Warner Cable Arena; 17,870	13–42
56	February 23	Denver	L 99–113	Kemba Walker (24)	Bismack Biyombo (9)	Kemba Walker (5)	Time Warner Cable Arena; 18,481	13–43
57	February 26	@ L.A. Clippers	L 84–106	Gerald Henderson Jr. (24)	Byron Mullens (8)	Kemba Walker (5)	Staples Center; 19,060	13–44

March : 4–12 (home: 4–3; road: 0–9)

Game	Date	Team	Score	High points	High rebounds	High assists	Location Attendance	Record
58	March 1	@ Utah	L 68–98	Byron Mullens (12)	Byron Mullens (7)	Kemba Walker (7)	EnergySolutions Arena; 17,691	13–45
59	March 3	@ Sacramento	L 83–119	Byron Mullens (12)	Michael Kidd-Gilchrist (6)	Kemba Walker (6)	Power Balance Pavilion; 14,555	13–46
60	March 4	@ Portland	L 105–122	Ramon Sessions (18)	Michael Kidd-Gilchrist (10)	Kemba Walker (11)	Rose Garden; 18,330	13–47
61	March 6	Brooklyn	L 78–99	Michael Kidd-Gilchrist (17)	Josh McRoberts (6)	Kemba Walker (8)	Time Warner Cable Arena; 13,382	13–48
62	March 8	Oklahoma City	L 94–116	Gerald Henderson Jr. (21)	Jeff Adrien (6)	Gerald Henderson Jr. (5)	Time Warner Cable Arena; 18,870	13–49
63	March 9	@ Washington	L 87–104	Kemba Walker (29)	Bismack Biyombo (7)	Kemba Walker (6)	Verizon Center; 16,357	13–50
64	March 12	Boston	W 100–74	Gerald Henderson Jr. (35)	Josh McRoberts (10)	Kemba Walker (4)	Time Warner Cable Arena; 15,006	14–50
65	March 15	@ Toronto	L 78–92	Gerald Henderson Jr. (22)	Josh McRoberts (9)	Kemba Walker (4)	Air Canada Centre; 17,514	14–51
66	March 16	@ Boston	L 88–105	Jannero Pargo (18)	Josh McRoberts (10)	Gerald Henderson Jr. (4)	TD Garden; 18,624	14–52
67	March 18	Washington	W 119–114	Gerald Henderson Jr. (27)	Michael Kidd-Gilchrist (7)	Gerald Henderson Jr. (8)	Time Warner Cable Arena; 10,141	15–52
68	March 20	Toronto	W 107–101	Byron Mullens (25)	Josh McRoberts (12)	Kemba Walker (8)	Time Warner Cable Arena; 12,872	16–52
69	March 23	Detroit	L 91–92	Kemba Walker (25)	Bismack Biyombo (10)	Kemba Walker; Jannero Pargo (3)	Time Warner Cable Arena; 16,375	16–53
70	March 24	@ Miami	L 77–109	Kemba Walker (20)	Bismack Biyombo (11)	Kemba Walker (3)	American Airlines Arena; 20,350	16–54
71	March 27	Orlando	W 114–108	Gerald Henderson Jr. (34)	Josh McRoberts (8)	Kemba Walker (9)	Time Warner Cable Arena; 11,839	17–54
72	March 29	@ New York	L 102–111	Gerald Henderson Jr. (35)	Bismack Biyombo (9)	Kemba Walker (8)	Madison Square Garden; 19,033	17–55
73	March 30	@ Philadelphia	L 92–100	Michael Kidd-Gilchrist (21)	Michael Kidd-Gilchrist (9)	Kemba Walker (9)	Wells Fargo Center; 16,764	17–56

April : 4–5 (home: 4–1; road: 0–4)

Game	Date	Team	Score	High points	High rebounds	High assists	Location Attendance	Record
74	April 1	@ Milwaukee	L 102–131	Kemba Walker (27)	Josh McRoberts (10)	Kemba Walker (6)	BMO Harris Bradley Center; 15,315	17–57
75	April 3	Philadelphia	W 88–83	Gerald Henderson Jr. (24)	Josh McRoberts (16)	Kemba Walker (10)	Time Warner Cable Arena; 13,097	18–57
76	April 5	Miami	L 79–89	Michael Kidd-Gilchrist (18)	Michael Kidd-Gilchrist (14)	Kemba Walker (4)	Time Warner Cable Arena; 19,568	18–58
77	April 6	@ Brooklyn	L 96–105	Ben Gordon (27)	Bismack Biyombo (10)	Gerald Henderson Jr. (5)	Barclays Center; 17,444	18–59
78	April 9	@ Memphis	L 75–94	Kemba Walker (19)	Bismack Biyombo (12)	Kemba Walker (3)	FedExForum; 16,591	18–60
79	April 12	@ Detroit	L 93–113	Kemba Walker (28)	Bismack Biyombo (8)	Kemba Walker (6)	The Palace of Auburn Hills; 19,501	18–61
80	April 13	Milwaukee	W 95–85	Kemba Walker (21)	Bismack Biyombo (17)	Josh McRoberts (9)	Time Warner Cable Arena; 14,680	19–61
81	April 15	New York	W 106–95	Gerald Henderson Jr. (27)	Bismack Biyombo (11)	Kemba Walker (13)	Time Warner Cable Arena; 15,238	20–61
82	April 17	Cleveland	W 105–98	Kemba Walker (24)	Kidd-Gilchrist & McRoberts (8)	Kemba Walker (7)	Time Warner Cable Arena; 13,487	21–61

2012–13 season schedule

=== Standings ===
Southeast Division	W	L	PCT	GB	Home	Road	Div	GP
z-Miami Heat	66	16	.805	–	37–4	29–12	15–1	82
x-Atlanta Hawks	44	38	.537	22	25–16	19–22	11–5	82
Washington Wizards	29	53	.354	37	22–19	7–34	5–11	82
Charlotte Bobcats	21	61	.256	45	15–26	6–35	6–10	82
Orlando Magic	20	62	.244	46	12–29	8–33	3–13	82

Eastern Conference
#	Team	W	L	PCT	GB	GP
1	z-Miami Heat *	66	16	.805	–	82
2	y-New York Knicks *	54	28	.659	12.0	82
3	y-Indiana Pacers *	49	32	.605	16.5	81
4	x-Brooklyn Nets	49	33	.598	17.0	82
5	x-Chicago Bulls	45	37	.549	21.0	82
6	x-Atlanta Hawks	44	38	.537	22.0	82
7	x-Boston Celtics	41	40	.506	24.5	81
8	x-Milwaukee Bucks	38	44	.463	28.0	82
9	Philadelphia 76ers	34	48	.415	32.0	82
10	Toronto Raptors	34	48	.415	32.0	82
11	Washington Wizards	29	53	.354	37.0	82
12	Detroit Pistons	29	53	.354	37.0	82
13	Cleveland Cavaliers	24	58	.293	42.0	82
14	Charlotte Bobcats	21	61	.256	45.0	82
15	Orlando Magic	20	62	.244	46.0	82

== Player statistics ==
=== Ragular season ===
Player	POS	GP	GS	MP	REB	AST	STL	BLK	PTS	MPG	RPG	APG	SPG	BPG	PPG
Kemba Walker	PG	82	82	2,859	283	471	160	31	1,455	34.9	3.5	5.7	2.0	.4	17.7
Bismack Biyombo	C	80	65	2,186	582	35	28	143	386	27.3	7.3	.4	.4	1.8	4.8
Michael Kidd-Gilchrist	SF	78	77	2,025	455	117	54	70	704	26.0	5.8	1.5	.7	.9	9.0
Jeffery Taylor	SF	77	29	1,507	150	63	47	15	472	19.6	1.9	.8	.6	.2	6.1
Ben Gordon	SG	75	0	1,560	130	141	35	16	840	20.8	1.7	1.9	.5	.2	11.2
Gerald Henderson Jr.	SG	68	58	2,133	250	177	68	34	1,055	31.4	3.7	2.6	1.0	.5	15.5
Brendan Haywood	C	61	17	1,162	290	29	16	49	216	19.0	4.8	.5	.3	.8	3.5
Ramon Sessions	SG	61	0	1,652	169	230	48	7	876	27.1	2.8	3.8	.8	.1	14.4
Byron Mullens	PF	53	41	1,428	337	81	34	32	564	26.9	6.4	1.5	.6	.6	10.6
Jeff Adrien	PF	52	5	713	196	36	18	27	209	13.7	3.8	.7	.3	.5	4.0
Reggie Williams	SF	40	0	380	51	39	12	1	146	9.5	1.3	1.0	.3	.0	3.7
Hakim Warrick^{†}	PF	27	14	482	89	25	12	6	190	17.9	3.3	.9	.4	.2	7.0
Josh McRoberts^{†}	PF	26	19	802	188	71	22	15	242	30.8	7.2	2.7	.8	.6	9.3
Tyrus Thomas	PF	26	2	360	60	19	14	15	125	13.8	2.3	.7	.5	.6	4.8
DeSagana Diop	C	22	1	226	51	13	5	16	16	10.3	2.3	.6	.2	.7	.7
Jannero Pargo^{†}	PG	18	0	292	22	34	15	2	151	16.2	1.2	1.9	.8	.1	8.4
Cory Higgins	SG	6	0	32	3	5	3	0	14	5.3	.5	.8	.5	.0	2.3
Matt Carroll	SG	1	0	6	0	1	0	0	0	6.0	.0	1.0	.0	.0	.0

- ^{†} Denotes player spent time with another team in the season. Stats reflect time with the Bobcats only.

== Transactions ==
=== Overview ===
Players Added

Via draft

- Michael Kidd-Gilchrist
- Jeffery Taylor

Via free agency

- Brendan Haywood
- Ramon Sessions
- Josh Owens

Via trade

- Ben Gordon
Players Lost

Via trade

- Corey Maggette

Via free agency

- D. J. Augustin

Waived

- Jamario Moon

Retirement

- Eduardo Nájera

=== Trades ===
June 26, 2012	To Charlotte Bobcats Ben Gordon, future first-round pick	To Detroit Pistons Corey Maggette

=== Free agents ===
Additions
Player	Date signed	Former team
Ramon Sessions	July 13	Los Angeles Lakers
Brendan Haywood	July 14	Dallas Mavericks
Josh Owens	September 25	Stanford University (Undrafted in 2012)
DaJuan Summers	September 25	New Orleans Hornets

Subtractions
Player	Date left	New team
D. J. Augustin	July 13	Indiana Pacers
D. J. White	September 25	Shanghai Sharks (China)
Derrick Brown	September 27	San Antonio Spurs

== See also ==
- List of 2012–13 NBA season transactions
- List of Charlotte Hornets seasons
