= David West (basketball) =

American basketball player (born 1980)

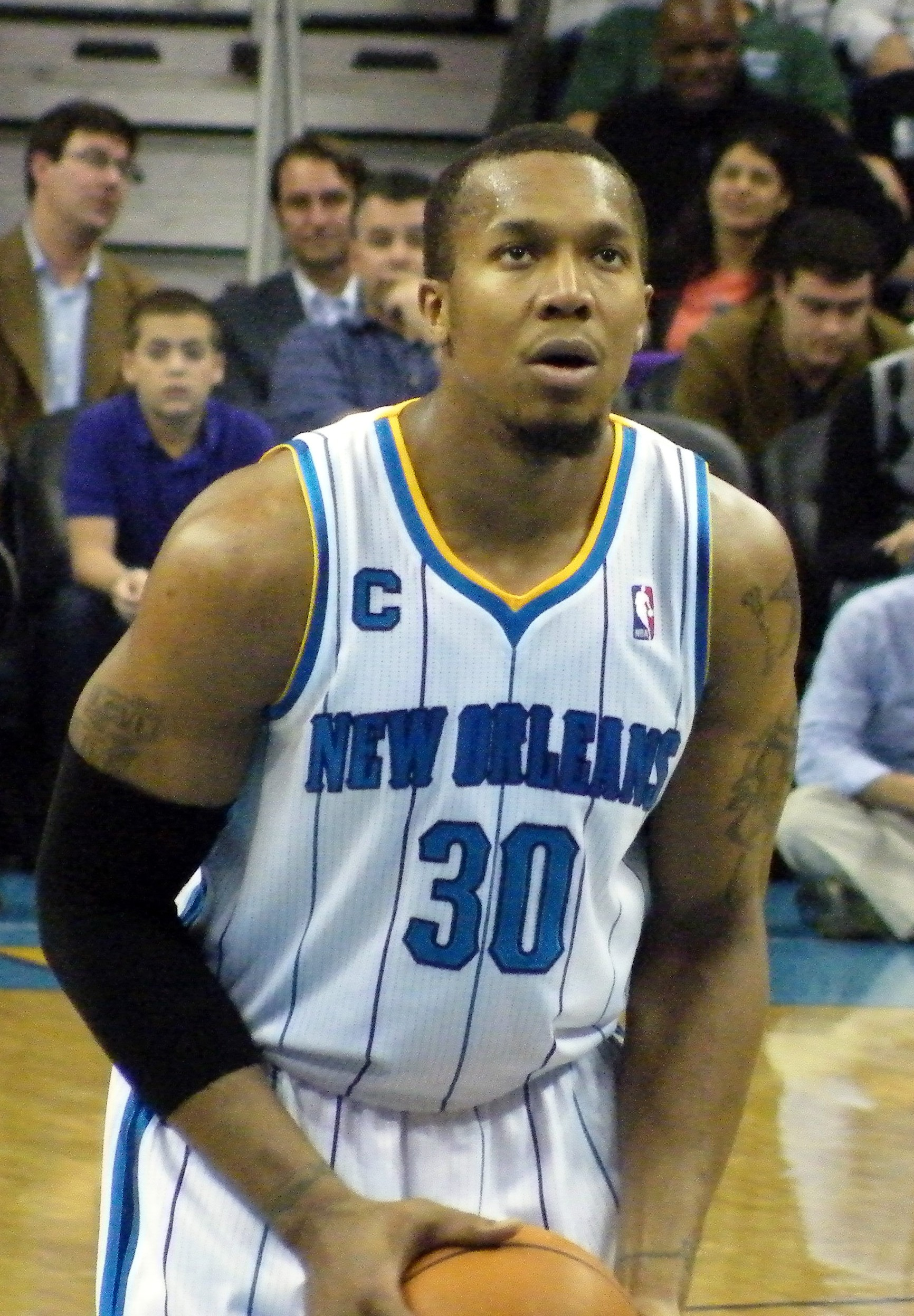
- West with the New Orleans Hornets in 2011

Personal information
- Born: August 29, 1980 (age 46) Teaneck, New Jersey, U.S.
- Listed height: 6 ft 9 in (2.06 m)
- Listed weight: 250 lb (113 kg)

Career information
- High school: Garner (Garner, North Carolina); Hargrave Military Academy (Chatham, Virginia)
- College: Xavier (1999–2003)
- NBA draft: 2003: 1st round, 18th overall pick
- Drafted by: New Orleans Hornets
- Playing career: 2003–2018
- Position: Power forward
- Number: 30, 21, 3

Career history
- 2003–2011: New Orleans Hornets (Note: During the 2005–06 and 2006–07 seasons, the team was known as the New Orleans/Oklahoma City Hornets during their temporary relocation to Oklahoma City due to Hurricane Katrina.)
- 2011–2015: Indiana Pacers
- 2015–2016: San Antonio Spurs
- 2016–2018: Golden State Warriors

Career highlights
- 2× NBA champion (2017, 2018); 2× NBA All-Star (2008, 2009); AP National Player of the Year (2003); Oscar Robertson Trophy winner (2003); Consensus first-team All-American (2003); Pete Newell Big Man Award (2003); 3× Atlantic 10 Player of the Year (2001–2003); 3× First-team All-Atlantic 10 (2001–2003); No. 30 retired by Xavier Musketeers

Career NBA statistics
- Points: 14,034 (13.6 ppg)
- Rebounds: 6,590 (6.4 rpg)
- Assists: 2,273 (2.2 apg)
- Stats at NBA.com
- Stats at Basketball Reference

David Moorer West (born August 29, 1980) is an American former professional basketball player who played 15 seasons in the National Basketball Association (NBA) for the New Orleans Hornets, Indiana Pacers, San Antonio Spurs and Golden State Warriors. He played college basketball for the Xavier Musketeers, earning national college player of the year honors from the Associated Press (AP) and United States Basketball Writers Association (USBWA) as a senior in 2003. West was a two-time NBA All-Star (2008 and 2009) and a two-time NBA champion (2017 and 2018).

== High school and college career ==
West attended Garner Magnet High School in Garner, North Carolina and Hargrave Military Academy in Chatham, Virginia. As a senior in 1998–99, he earned first-team all-state honors playing for Hargrave.

In his freshman season at Xavier, West was named to the Atlantic 10 All-Rookie Team after leading the A-10 in rebounding (9.1) and finishing fourth on the Musketeers in scoring (11.7).

In his sophomore season, West led Xavier in scoring (17.8 ppg), rebounding (10.9 rpg, tops in A-10 and fourth nationally) and blocks (2.1 bpg). He recorded five 20-point, 20-rebound games throughout the 2000–01 season as West earned his first A-10 Player of the Year award.

In his junior season, West was named the A-10 Player of the Year and the league's Defensive Player of the Year, while also winning A-10 Tournament MVP honors. He averaged 9.8 rebounds (26th in nation) and 2.5 blocks (22nd in nation) per game, and recorded the first triple-double in school history with 15 points, 10 rebounds, and 10 assists against Long Island University.

In his senior season, West garnered two of the five major college basketball Player of the Year honors, being named AP National Player of the Year and National Player of the Year by the United States Basketball Writers Association. He became the first three-time Atlantic 10 Player of the Year, and was named first-team All-America by the Associated Press in 2002–03. West also became just the third player in Xavier history to surpass 2,000 points and only the second to eclipse 2,000 points and 1,000 rebounds, joining Tyrone Hill.

In October 2007, Sports Illustrated released Sports Illustrated: The Basketball Book, which featured West on its NCAA All-Decade Team for the decade beginning in 2000. He was joined by Connecticut's Emeka Okafor and three Duke players, Jay Williams, J. J. Redick and Shane Battier.

== Professional career ==
=== New Orleans Hornets (2003–2011) ===
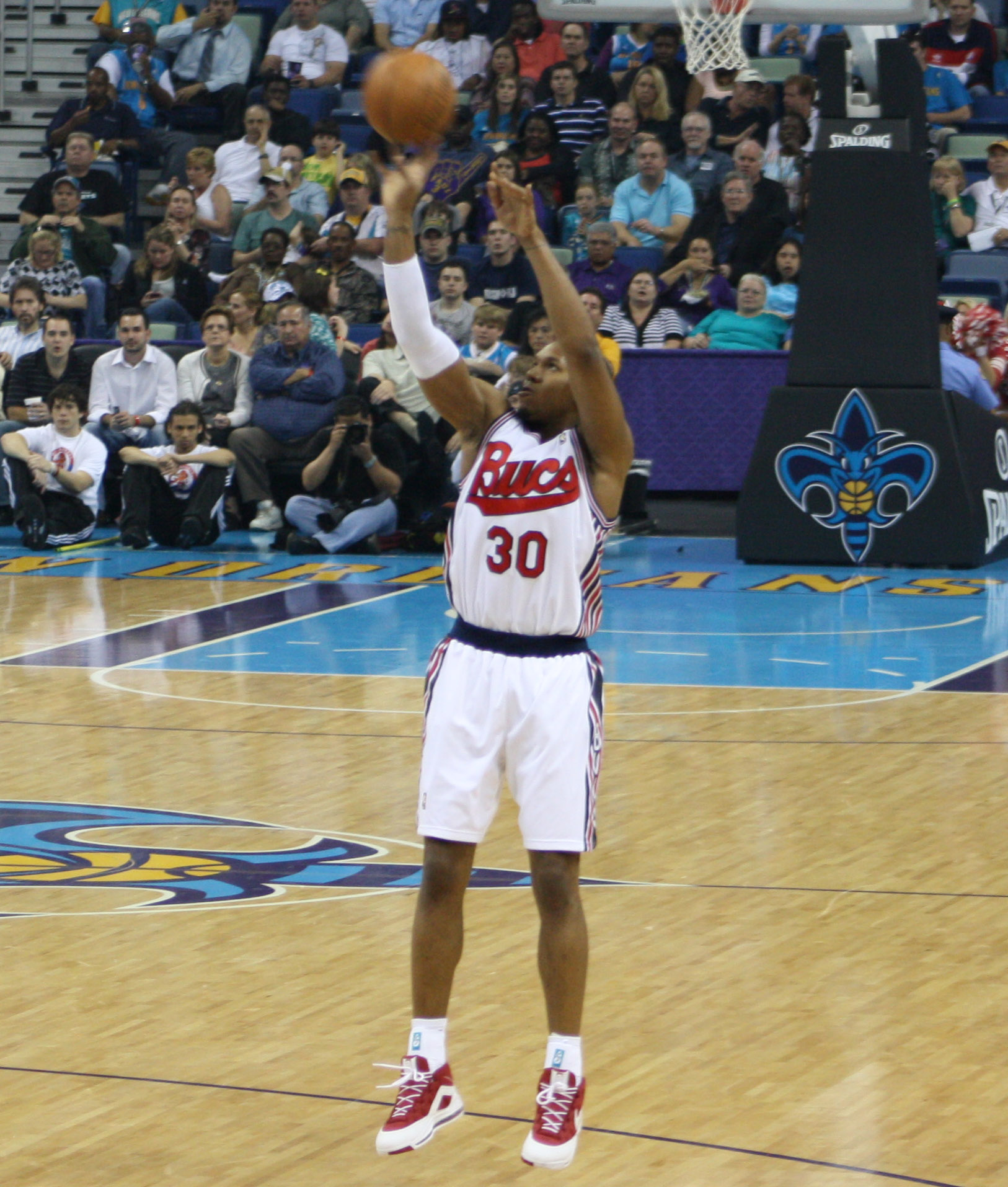
West in a game with the Hornets in 2010

West was drafted by the New Orleans Hornets with the 18th overall pick in the 2003 NBA draft. After recording modest production in his first two seasons, in 2005–06, West enjoyed a breakthrough as he averaged 17.4 points and 7.4 rebounds with a .512 FG% in 74 games. That year, he finished second in the voting for the NBA Most Improved Player Award, behind Boris Diaw of the Phoenix Suns. He also saw some time at center, due to the team's lack of a true big man and demonstrated an ability to perform under pressure, as he converted three game-winning jump shots.

In 2006–07, West ended the season averaging 18.3 points, 8.2 rebounds and 2.2 assists per game. Despite missing 30 games due to an elbow injury, West recorded five games of 30 or more points and 13 games of 20 or more points.

West again increased his statistical production in 2007–08, and was selected to his first NBA All-Star Game as a reserve, along with teammate Chris Paul. Paul later stated that he would rather not play with a power forward in the league other than West, because "he's not in it for the spotlight, all he cares about is getting buckets [scoring]." West reinforced his desire to be a team player in a 2008 postseason interview, saying that he does not care about being overlooked but would rather "play and be as effective as possible" while on the court.

In 2008–09, West repeated as an all-star and posted a new career high by scoring 21.0 points per game.

On March 25, 2011, during one of the Hornets' last games of the season against the Utah Jazz, West came down awkwardly after a dunk. The event occurred with 22.3 seconds left in the fourth quarter. West tore his anterior cruciate ligament in his left knee and was ruled out for the rest of the season.

On June 27, 2011, West opted out of the final year of his contract to become a free agent.

=== Indiana Pacers (2011–2015) ===
On December 13, 2011, West signed a two-year, $20 million contract with the Indiana Pacers. On April 21, 2012, West led the Pacers in scoring with 32 points and rebounding with 12 rebounds during a 109–106 overtime loss to the Philadelphia 76ers.

On January 12, 2013, West recorded his first career triple-double with 14 points, 12 rebounds and 10 assists in the 96–88 win over the Charlotte Bobcats.

On July 10, 2013, West re-signed with the Pacers to a three-year, $36.6 million contract. In June 2015, he opted out of his contract with the Pacers to become a free agent.

=== San Antonio Spurs (2015–2016) ===
On July 17, 2015, West signed with the San Antonio Spurs. He made his debut for the Spurs in the team's season opener against the Oklahoma City Thunder on October 28, recording 8 points and 2 rebounds off the bench in a 112–106 loss. On January 6, 2016, West, starting in place of LaMarcus Aldridge, recorded season-highs of 18 points and 13 rebounds in a 123–98 win over the Utah Jazz, helping the Spurs extend its franchise-record home winning streak to 30 straight regular-season games dating to 2014–15.

=== Golden State Warriors (2016–2018) ===
On July 9, 2016, West signed with the Golden State Warriors. He emerged as a key bench player for the Warriors, particularly for his skilled passing abilities. Throughout January and February 2017, West missed 14 games with a non-displaced fracture in his left thumb. On March 29, 2017, West recorded a season-high 15 points and a game-high plus-23 during a 110–98 comeback victory over the San Antonio Spurs. The Warriors finished the season as the #1-seed in the West with a 67–15 record. Following a 129–115 victory in Game 4 of the Western Conference Finals over the Spurs, the Warriors were undefeated in the first three playoff series, reaching their third straight NBA Finals. West played in every playoff game, as the Warriors defeated the Cleveland Cavaliers 4–1 in the 2017 NBA Finals. The Warriors finished the playoffs with a 16–1 record, the best postseason winning percentage in NBA history.

On July 25, 2017, after winning his first championship ring, West re-signed with the Warriors for another year, with expectations to retire after the 2017–18 season. On January 8, 2018, West became the 127th player in NBA history to play in 1,000 regular-season games, recording 10 points, six rebounds, and four assists in a 124–114 victory over the Denver Nuggets. After reaching that milestone, West noted that he might consider signing again for the 2018–19 season, saying, "It all depends on how my body feels. Right now I feel good." The Warriors advanced to the NBA Finals for the fourth straight season, where they won their second straight championship with a four-game sweep of the Cavaliers, giving West his second NBA championship.

=== Retirement ===
On August 30, 2018, West announced his retirement from the NBA after 15 seasons.

== Awards and honors ==
- 2× NBA All-Star: 2008, 2009
- Three-time Atlantic 10 Conference Player of the Year
- 2003 AP National Player of the Year
- 2003 National Player of the Year by the United States Basketball Writers Association
- 2003 Pete Newell Big Man award from the National Association of Basketball Coaches
- First-team All-America by AP as a senior
- Second-team All-America by AP as a junior
- Honorable mention All-America by AP as a sophomore

== Career statistics ==
Legend
GP	Games played	GS	Games started	MPG	Minutes per game
FG%	Field goal percentage	3P%	3-point field goal percentage	FT%	Free throw percentage
RPG	Rebounds per game	APG	Assists per game	SPG	Steals per game
BPG	Blocks per game	PPG	Points per game	**Bold**	Career high
†	Won an NBA championship	*	Led the league

=== NBA ===
==== Regular season ====
Year	Team	GP	GS	MPG	FG%	3P%	FT%	RPG	APG	SPG	BPG	PPG
2003–04	New Orleans	71	1	13.1	.474	.000	.713	4.2	.8	.4	.4	3.8
2004–05	New Orleans	30	8	18.4	.436	.400	.680	4.3	.8	.4	.5	6.2
2005–06	New Orleans	74	74	34.1	.512	.273	.843	7.4	1.2	.8	.9	17.1
2006–07	New Orleans	52	52	36.5	.476	.320	.824	8.2	2.2	.8	.7	18.3
2007–08	New Orleans	76	76	37.8	.482	.240	.850	**8.9**	2.3	.8	**1.3**	20.6
2008–09	New Orleans	76	76	**39.2**	.472	.240	**.884**	8.5	2.3	.6	.9	**21.0**
2009–10	New Orleans	**81**	**81**	36.4	.505	.259	.865	7.5	3.0	.9	.7	19.0
2010–11	New Orleans	70	70	35.0	.508	.222	.807	7.6	2.3	**1.0**	.9	18.9
2011–12	Indiana	66*	66*	29.2	.487	.222	.807	6.6	2.1	.8	.7	12.8
2012–13	Indiana	73	73	33.4	.498	.211	.768	7.7	2.9	**1.0**	.9	17.1
2013–14	Indiana	80	80	30.9	.488	.267	.789	6.8	2.8	.8	.9	14.0
2014–15	Indiana	66	66	28.7	.471	.200	.739	6.8	**3.4**	.7	.7	11.7
2015–16	San Antonio	78	19	18.0	.545	**.429**	.788	4.0	1.8	.6	.7	7.1
2016–17†	Golden State	68	0	12.6	.536	.375	.768	3.0	2.2	.6	.7	4.6
2017–18†	Golden State	73	0	13.7	**.571**	.375	.759	3.3	1.9	.6	1.0	6.8
Career		1,034	742	28.2	.495	.265	.817	6.4	2.2	.7	.8	13.6
All-Star		2	0	15.0	.545	.000	.000	3.5	.5	.5	.0	6.0

==== Playoffs ====
Year	Team	GP	GS	MPG	FG%	3P%	FT%	RPG	APG	SPG	BPG	PPG
2004	New Orleans	7	0	15.9	.536	–	.846	4.3	1.1	.3	.6	5.9
2008	New Orleans	12	12	**40.4**	.466	**.500**	.891	**8.5**	2.8	**1.1**	**1.9**	**21.2**
2009	New Orleans	5	5	35.6	.400	–	.897	7.4	1.2	1.0	.4	18.0
2012	Indiana	11	11	37.8	.446	–	.818	**8.5**	2.0	.7	.5	15.3
2013	Indiana	**19**	**19**	36.3	.462	.000	.766	7.6	2.1	.7	.8	15.9
2014	Indiana	18	18	36.3	.483	.222	.705	6.9	**4.1**	.8	.8	15.1
2016	San Antonio	10	0	17.6	.455	**.500**	.556	3.7	1.3	.6	.7	5.8
2017†	Golden State	17	0	13.0	.576	**.500**	.778	2.7	2.1	.4	.8	4.5
2018†	Golden State	18	0	9.7	**.600**	**.500**	**1.000**	2.1	1.8	.3	.6	3.3
Career		118	66	26.6	.476	.320	.796	5.6	2.2	.6	.8	11.3

=== College ===
Year	Team	GP	GS	MPG	FG%	3P%	FT%	RPG	APG	SPG	BPG	PPG
1999–00	Xavier	**33**	**33**	29.4	.532	.000	.667	9.1	1.7	**1.6**	1.1	11.7
2000–01	Xavier	29	29	33.7	**.551**	.000	.740	10.9	2.0	1.4	2.1	17.8
2001–02	Xavier	32	32	34.2	.536	.321	.768	9.8	1.6	1.2	**2.5**	18.3
2002–03	Xavier	32	32	**36.5**	.513	**.346**	**.816**	**11.8**	**3.2**	1.3	1.6	**20.1**
Career		126	126	33.4	.531	.327	.757	10.4	2.1	1.4	1.8	16.9

== Executive career ==
In November 2018, West became the first Chief Operating Officer (COO) of the Historical Basketball League (HBL), a college basketball league set to launch in 2020. The HBL later changed its name to The Professional Collegiate League, with West explaining that the organization produces a more equitable system to "challenge the exploitation at the collegiate basketball level. ... Predominantly young black men, working, not being paid for their labor, and that labor being directly, monetarily beneficial for everyone but them."

== Personal life ==
West is the son of Amos and Harriet West. He and his wife Lesley have one daughter, Dasia, and one son, David Benjamin.

West is very interested in education, "black history, philosophy and various societal issues". He also loves to make mixtapes for his teammates, saying that it is a healthy habit that keeps him "in the house and off [his] feet".

West has a Xavier "X" tattooed on his arm which displays, on either side, "My life, my way".

=== Political views ===
In mid-2019, West appeared as a panelist and commentator on The Young Turks political news program to discuss Juneteenth.

In a July 2020 interview with Black Agenda Report, West lamented the lack of understanding about China among Americans and denounced anti-China foreign policy hawks as "warmongers." Regarding the NBA's rift with China following Daryl Morey's tweet supporting the 2019–20 Hong Kong protests, West stated that the Hong Kong issue is more complicated than how it is portrayed in the American media, and that he contacted NBA players to caution them about being used as political pawns against China, stating: "I got on the phone with a bunch of NBA guys, and I was like 'Don't let them pull you into this bullshit, because it's the Iraq war-, weapons of mass destruction-type propaganda again." Regarding the manner in which China is presented in the American media, West stated: "As people in the world, as Americans and people in American society, we have been misled."

Concerning American politics, West expressed support for Medicare for All and stated that American society needs a fundamental restructuring in order to combat police brutality, food deserts, and discrimination against black people in the healthcare industry. He stated that America has an "imperial lust that we haven't been able to get rid of," adding that "it has put us behind other nations in the fact that nations are united internally against the imperial wishes of the United States." West praised China for its improvements in poverty elimination, education, and life expectancy, and stated that China has "built their society in a way to defend itself against the constant imposition of Western imperialism. And in the midst of all of that, they have still been able to eke out some of the greatest advancements in human history. ... They've done it without war, they've done it without invasion, they've done it without bombing and blowing people up." He elaborated further that China demonstrates "there could be a functioning society outside of the control of the Western imperial power structure."

== See also ==
- List of NCAA Division I men's basketball players with 2000 points and 1000 rebounds
