= 2012–13 New York Knicks season =

Season of National Basketball Association team the New York Knicks

- Division champions
- Head coach: Mike Woodson
- General manager: Glen Grunwald
- Owners: Madison Square Garden, Inc.
- Arena: Madison Square Garden

Results
- Record: 54–28 (.659)
- Place: Division: 1st (Atlantic); Conference: 2nd (Eastern)
- Playoff finish: Conference Semifinals (lost to Pacers 2–4)
- Stats at Basketball Reference

Local media
- Television: MSG Network, MSG Plus, WWOR
- Radio: ESPN

The 2012–13 New York Knicks season was the 67th season of the franchise in the National Basketball Association (NBA). They clinched a playoff berth on March 22, 2013, with a win over the Toronto Raptors, and clinched the Atlantic division title on April 9 against the Washington Wizards.

In the playoffs, the Knicks defeated the Boston Celtics in six games in the first round, before falling to the Indiana Pacers in the conference semifinals in six games.

This was the Knicks' first Atlantic division title since the 1993–94 season, their highest win total since the 1996–97 season and their first 50-win season and playoff series win since the 1999–2000 season.

After this season, the Knicks did not return to the playoffs until the 2020–21 season. Moreover, they did not win 50 games, nor finish second in the East, until the 2023–24 season.

== Key dates ==
- June 28: The 2012 NBA draft takes place at Prudential Center in Newark, New Jersey.
- July 11: 2012 NBA Free Agency begins.

== Draft picks ==
Round	Pick	Player	Position	Nationality	School / College
2	48	Kostas Papanikolaou	F	Greece	Olympiacos B.C.

== Roster ==
2012–13 New York Knicks roster
Players

Pos.	No.	Player	Height	Weight	DOB	From
F	7	Carmelo Anthony	6 ft 8 in (2.03 m)	230 lb (104 kg)	1984–05–29	Syracuse
F/C	42	Earl Barron	7 ft 0 in (2.13 m)	250 lb (113 kg)	1981–08–14	Memphis
C	23	Marcus Camby	6 ft 11 in (2.11 m)	240 lb (109 kg)	1974–03–22	UMass
C	6	Tyson Chandler	7 ft 1 in (2.16 m)	240 lb (109 kg)	1982–10–02	Dominguez HS (CA)
F	14	Chris Copeland	6 ft 8 in (2.03 m)	225 lb (102 kg)	1984–03–17	Colorado
G	2	Raymond Felton	6 ft 1 in (1.85 m)	205 lb (93 kg)	1984–06–26	North Carolina
G	5	Jason Kidd	6 ft 4 in (1.93 m)	210 lb (95 kg)	1973–03–23	California
F	3	Kenyon Martin	6 ft 9 in (2.06 m)	240 lb (109 kg)	1977-12-30	Cincinnati
F	16	Steve Novak	6 ft 10 in (2.08 m)	235 lb (107 kg)	1983–06–13	Marquette
G	9	Pablo Prigioni	6 ft 3 in (1.91 m)	185 lb (84 kg)	1977–05–17	Argentina
F	55	Quentin Richardson	6 ft 6 in (1.98 m)	228 lb (103 kg)	1980–04–13	DePaul
G/F	21	Iman Shumpert	6 ft 5 in (1.96 m)	220 lb (100 kg)	1990–06–26	Georgia Tech
G	8	J. R. Smith	6 ft 6 in (1.98 m)	220 lb (100 kg)	1985–09–09	St. Benedict's Prep (NJ)
F/C	1	Amar'e Stoudemire	6 ft 11 in (2.11 m)	245 lb (111 kg)	1982–11–16	Cypress Creek HS (FL)
F/C	36	Rasheed Wallace	6 ft 10 in (2.08 m)	225 lb (102 kg)	1974–9–17	North Carolina
G/F	4	James White	6 ft 7 in (2.01 m)	215 lb (98 kg)	1982–10–21	Cincinnati

Coaches
Head coach
- Mike Woodson
Assistant(s)
- Herb Williams
- Darrell Walker
- Jim Todd

Legend
- (DP) Unsigned draft pick
- (FA) Free agent
- (S) Suspended
- (DL) On assignment to D-League affiliate
- Injured

Roster
Updated: 2013–04–17

== Standings ==
=== Division ===
Atlantic Division	W	L	PCT	GB	Home	Road	Div	GP
y-New York Knicks	54	28	.659	–	31–10	23–18	10–6	82
x-Brooklyn Nets	49	33	.598	5	26–15	23–18	11–5	82
x-Boston Celtics	41	40	.506	12.5	27–13	14–27	7–9	81†
Philadelphia 76ers	34	48	.415	20	23–18	11–30	7–9	82
Toronto Raptors	34	48	.415	20	21–20	13–28	5–11	82

=== Conference ===
Eastern Conference
#	Team	W	L	PCT	GB	GP
1	z-Miami Heat *	66	16	.805	–	82
2	y-New York Knicks *	54	28	.659	12.0	82
3	y-Indiana Pacers *	49	32	.605	16.5	81
4	x-Brooklyn Nets	49	33	.598	17.0	82
5	x-Chicago Bulls	45	37	.549	21.0	82
6	x-Atlanta Hawks	44	38	.537	22.0	82
7	x-Boston Celtics	41	40	.506	24.5	81
8	x-Milwaukee Bucks	38	44	.463	28.0	82
9	Philadelphia 76ers	34	48	.415	32.0	82
10	Toronto Raptors	34	48	.415	32.0	82
11	Washington Wizards	29	53	.354	37.0	82
12	Detroit Pistons	29	53	.354	37.0	82
13	Cleveland Cavaliers	24	58	.293	42.0	82
14	Charlotte Bobcats	21	61	.256	45.0	82
15	Orlando Magic	20	62	.244	46.0	82

== Game log ==
=== Pre-season ===
2012 pre-season game log
Pre-season: 3–3 (home: 0–0; road: 3–3)

Game	Date	Team	Score	High points	High rebounds	High assists	Location Attendance	Record
1	October 11	@ Washington	W 108–101	Steve Novak (21)	Carmelo Anthony (5)	Raymond Felton (8)	Verizon Center; 9,627	1–0
2	October 13	@ Boston	W 98–95 (OT)	Carmelo Anthony (23)	Three players (7)	Raymond Felton (7)	XL Center; 14,218	2–0
3	October 19	@ Toronto	L 88–107	Carmelo Anthony (24)	Carmelo Anthony (6)	Pablo Prigioni (5)	Bell Centre; 22,114	2–1
4	October 20	@ Boston	L 98–109	Chris Copeland (34)	Chris Copeland, Mychel Thompson (6)	Pablo Prigioni (9)	Times Union Center	2–2
5	October 22	@ Philadelphia	L 90–98	Carmelo Anthony, Raymond Felton (23)	Tyson Chandler (11)	Raymond Felton, Jason Kidd (4)	Carrier Dome; 8,831	2–3
6	October 24	@ Brooklyn	W 97–95 (OT)	Chris Copeland (16)	Carmelo Anthony (9)	Pablo Prigioni (11)	Nassau Coliseum; 15,957	3–3

2012–13 season schedule

=== Regular season ===
2012–13 game log
Total: 54–28 (home: 31–10; road: 23–18)
November: 11–4 (home: 6–0; road: 5–4)

Game	Date	Team	Score	High points	High rebounds	High assists	Location Attendance	Record
1	November 2	Miami	W 104–84	Carmelo Anthony (30)	Carmelo Anthony (10)	Raymond Felton (9)	Madison Square Garden; 19,033	1–0
2	November 4	Philadelphia	W 100–84	Carmelo Anthony (27)	J.R. Smith (9)	Jason Kidd (6)	Madison Square Garden; 19,033	2–0
3	November 5	@ Philadelphia	W 110–88	Carmelo Anthony (21)	Ronnie Brewer (10)	Raymond Felton (8)	Wells Fargo Center; 15,783	3–0
4	November 9	Dallas	W 104–94	Carmelo Anthony (31)	Tyson Chandler (9)	Raymond Felton (9)	Madison Square Garden; 19,033	4–0
5	November 13	@ Orlando	W 99–89	Carmelo Anthony (25)	Carmelo Anthony (8)	Raymond Felton (5)	Amway Center; 18,846	5–0
6	November 15	@ San Antonio	W 104–100	Raymond Felton (25)	Carmelo Anthony (12)	Raymond Felton (7)	AT&T Center; 18,581	6–0
7	November 16	@ Memphis	L 95–105	Carmelo Anthony (20)	Chandler & Smith (7)	Raymond Felton (5)	FedEx Forum; 17,516	6–1
8	November 18	Indiana	W 88–76	Carmelo Anthony (26)	Anthony & Chandler (9)	Raymond Felton (8)	Madison Square Garden; 19,033	7–1
9	November 20	@ New Orleans	W 102–80	Carmelo Anthony (29)	Tyson Chandler (12)	Raymond Felton (6)	New Orleans Arena; 13,705	8–1
10	November 21	@ Dallas	L 111–114	Carmelo Anthony (23)	Tyson Chandler (13)	Raymond Felton (11)	American Airlines Center; 20,157	8–2
11	November 23	@ Houston	L 103–131	Carmelo Anthony (37)	Tyson Chandler (7)	Raymond Felton (8)	Toyota Center; 18,038	8–3
12	November 25	Detroit	W 121–100	Carmelo Anthony (29)	J.R. Smith (10)	Raymond Felton (10)	Madison Square Garden; 19,033	9–3
13	November 26	@ Brooklyn	L 89–96 (OT)	Carmelo Anthony (35)	Carmelo Anthony (13)	Raymond Felton (5)	Barclays Center; 17,732	9–4
14	November 28	@ Milwaukee	W 102–88	Carmelo Anthony (29)	Anthony & Chandler (8)	Felton & Prigioni (7)	Bradley Center; 11,439	10–4
15	November 30	Washington	W 108–87	Anthony & Smith (20)	Tyson Chandler (10)	J.R. Smith (6)	Madison Square Garden; 19,033	11–4

December: 10–5 (home: 6–2; road: 4–3)

Game	Date	Team	Score	High points	High rebounds	High assists	Location Attendance	Record
16	December 2	Phoenix	W 106–99	Carmelo Anthony (34)	Tyson Chandler (13)	Raymond Felton (7)	Madison Square Garden; 19,033	12–4
17	December 5	@ Charlotte	W 100–98	Carmelo Anthony (23)	Tyson Chandler (17)	Raymond Felton (9)	Time Warner Cable Arena; 18,097	13–4
18	December 6	@ Miami	W 112–92	Raymond Felton (27)	Tyson Chandler (9)	Raymond Felton (7)	American Airlines Arena; 19,740	14–4
19	December 8	@ Chicago	L 85–93	Raymond Felton (27)	Tyson Chandler (18)	Raymond Felton (5)	United Center; 21,852	14–5
20	December 9	Denver	W 112–106	Carmelo Anthony (34)	Tyson Chandler (12)	Jason Kidd (7)	Madison Square Garden; 19,033	15–5
21	December 11	@ Brooklyn	W 100–97	Carmelo Anthony (45)	Tyson Chandler (7)	Raymond Felton (7)	Barclays Center; 17,732	16–5
22	December 13	L. A. Lakers	W 116–107	Carmelo Anthony (30)	Jason Kidd (9)	Raymond Felton (8)	Madison Square Garden; 19,033	17–5
23	December 15	Cleveland	W 103–102	Raymond Felton (25)	Tyson Chandler (10)	Jason Kidd (8)	Madison Square Garden; 19,033	18–5
24	December 17	Houston	L 96–109	Chris Copeland (29)	Tyson Chandler (18)	Pablo Prigioni (5)	Madison Square Garden; 19,033	18–6
25	December 19	Brooklyn	W 100–86	Carmelo Anthony (31)	Tyson Chandler (12)	Jason Kidd (5)	Madison Square Garden; 19,033	19–6
26	December 21	Chicago	L 106–110	Carmelo Anthony (29)	J.R. Smith (10)	Kidd, Felton & Prigioni (3)	Madison Square Garden; 19,033	19–7
27	December 23	Minnesota	W 94–91	Carmelo Anthony (33)	Tyson Chandler (9)	J.R. Smith (7)	Madison Square Garden; 19,033	20–7
28	December 25	@ L. A. Lakers	L 94–100	Carmelo Anthony (34)	Tyson Chandler (9)	Jason Kidd (7)	Staples Center; 18,997	20–8
29	December 26	@ Phoenix	W 99–97	J.R. Smith (27)	Tyson Chandler (12)	Jason Kidd (8)	US Airways Center; 15,153	21–8
30	December 28	@ Sacramento	L 105–106	J.R. Smith (28)	Tyson Chandler (18)	Pablo Prigioni (9)	Sleep Train Arena; 16,407	21–9

January: 7–6 (home: 4–4; road: 3–2)

Game	Date	Team	Score	High points	High rebounds	High assists	Location Attendance	Record
31	January 1	Portland	L 100–105	Carmelo Anthony (45)	J.R. Smith (11)	J.R. Smith (5)	Madison Square Garden; 19,033	21–10
32	January 3	San Antonio	W 100–83	Carmelo Anthony (23)	Tyson Chandler (14)	Pablo Prigioni (9)	Madison Square Garden; 19,033	22–10
33	January 5	@ Orlando	W 114–106	Carmelo Anthony (40)	Tyson Chandler (12)	Jason Kidd (7)	Amway Center; 19,171	23–10
34	January 7	Boston	L 96–102	J.R. Smith (24)	Tyson Chandler (17)	Jason Kidd (6)	Madison Square Garden; 19,033	23–11
35	January 10	@ Indiana	L 76–81	J.R. Smith (25)	Tyson Chandler (15)	J.R. Smith (6)	Bankers Life Fieldhouse; 16,568	23–12
36	January 11	Chicago	L 101–108	Carmelo Anthony (39)	Tyson Chandler (18)	Pablo Prigioni (8)	Madison Square Garden; 19,033	23–13
37	January 13	New Orleans	W 100–87	Carmelo Anthony (27)	Tyson Chandler (18)	Jason Kidd (8)	Madison Square Garden; 19,033	24–13
38	January 17	@ Detroit	W 102–87	Carmelo Anthony (26)	Tyson Chandler (14)	Anthony, Kidd, & Smith (4)	The O2 Arena, London; 18,689	25–13
39	January 21	Brooklyn	L 85–88	Carmelo Anthony (29)	Tyson Chandler (11)	Carmelo Anthony (7)	Madison Square Garden; 19,033	25–14
40	January 24	@ Boston	W 89–86	Carmelo Anthony (28)	Anthony & Stoudemire (9)	Pablo Prigioni (4)	TD Garden; 18,624	26–14
41	January 26	@ Philadelphia	L 80–97	Carmelo Anthony (25)	Tyson Chandler (10)	Carmelo Anthony (4)	Wells Fargo Center; 20,540	26–15
42	January 27	Atlanta	W 106–104	Carmelo Anthony (42)	Amar'e Stoudemire (8)	Raymond Felton (10)	Madison Square Garden; 19,033	27–15
43	January 30	Orlando	W 113–97	Tyson Chandler (21)	Anthony & Chandler (7)	Raymond Felton (9)	Madison Square Garden; 19,033	28–15

February: 6–5 (home: 5–2; road: 1–3)

Game	Date	Team	Score	High points	High rebounds	High assists	Location Attendance	Record
44	February 1	Milwaukee	W 96–86	Carmelo Anthony (25)	Tyson Chandler (20)	Raymond Felton (8)	Madison Square Garden; 19,033	29–15
45	February 2	Sacramento	W 120–81	J.R. Smith (25)	Tyson Chandler (20)	Raymond Felton (8)	Madison Square Garden; 19,033	30–15
46	February 4	Detroit	W 99–85	Carmelo Anthony (27)	Tyson Chandler (20)	Raymond Felton (9)	Madison Square Garden; 19,033	31–15
47	February 6	@ Washington	L 96–106	Carmelo Anthony (31)	Tyson Chandler (13)	Raymond Felton (4)	Verizon Center; 18,263	31–16
48	February 8	@ Minnesota	W 100–94	Carmelo Anthony (36)	Carmelo Anthony (9)	Kidd, Prigioni & Smith (4)	Target Center; 16,542	32–16
49	February 10	L. A. Clippers	L 88–102	Carmelo Anthony (42)	Tyson Chandler (11)	Raymond Felton (5)	Madison Square Garden; 19,033	32–17
50	February 13	Toronto	L 88–92	J.R. Smith (26)	Carmelo Anthony (12)	Raymond Felton (5)	Madison Square Garden; 19,033	32–18
All-Star Break
51	February 20	@ Indiana	L 91–125	Tyson Chandler (19)	Tyson Chandler (11)	Pablo Prigioni (8)	Bankers Life Fieldhouse; 16,123	32–19
52	February 22	@ Toronto	L 98–100	Carmelo Anthony (32)	Chandler & Kidd (7)	Anthony, Kidd, & Smith (4)	Air Canada Centre; 19,800	32–20
53	February 24	Philadelphia	W 99–93	Carmelo Anthony (29)	Tyson Chandler (12)	Pablo Prigioni (5)	Madison Square Garden; 19,033	33–20
54	February 27	Golden State	W 109–105	Carmelo Anthony (35)	Tyson Chandler (28)	Carmelo Anthony (8)	Madison Square Garden; 19,033	34–20

March: 12–6 (home: 6–2; road: 6–4)

Game	Date	Team	Score	High points	High rebounds	High assists	Location Attendance	Record
55	March 1	@ Washington	W 96–88	Carmelo Anthony (30)	J.R. Smith (12)	Jason Kidd (5)	Verizon Center; 20,308	35–20
56	March 3	Miami	L 93–99	Carmelo Anthony (32)	J.R. Smith (12)	Jason Kidd (6)	Madison Square Garden; 19,033	35–21
57	March 4	@ Cleveland	W 102–97	Amar'e Stoudemire (22)	Tyson Chandler (9)	Raymond Felton (10)	Quicken Loans Arena; 19,784	36–21
58	March 6	@ Detroit	W 87–77	Raymond Felton (26)	Tyson Chandler (11)	Jason Kidd (6)	The Palace of Auburn Hills; 16,181	37–21
59	March 7	Oklahoma City	L 94–95	J.R. Smith (36)	Kidd, Chandler (10)	Felton, Kidd, & Smith (3)	Madison Square Garden; 19,033	37–22
60	March 9	Utah	W 113–84	J.R. Smith (24)	Tyson Chandler (9)	Raymond Felton (4)	Madison Square Garden; 19,033	38–22
61	March 11	@ Golden State	L 63–92	Chris Copeland (15)	Carmelo Anthony (10)	Raymond Felton (4)	Oracle Arena; 19,596	38–23
62	March 13	@ Denver	L 94–117	Iman Shumpert (20)	Chris Copeland (6)	J.R. Smith (8)	Pepsi Center; 19,155	38–24
63	March 14	@ Portland	L 90–105	J.R. Smith (33)	Marcus Camby (10)	Pablo Prigioni (5)	Rose Garden; 20,636	38–25
64	March 17	@ L. A. Clippers	L 80–93	J.R. Smith (17)	Kenyon Martin (9)	Raymond Felton (9)	Staples Center; 19,412	38–26
65	March 18	@ Utah	W 90–83	J.R. Smith (20)	Kenyon Martin (9)	Jason Kidd (5)	EnergySolutions Arena; 18,494	39–26
66	March 20	Orlando	W 106–94	J.R. Smith (22)	Carmelo Anthony (8)	Pablo Prigioni (5)	Madison Square Garden; 19,033	40–26
67	March 22	@ Toronto	W 99–94	Carmelo Anthony (37)	Kenyon Martin (11)	Felton, Kidd, Shumpert, & Smith (3)	Air Canada Centre; 19,800	41–26
68	March 23	Toronto	W 110–84	Carmelo Anthony (28)	Carmelo Anthony (8)	Pablo Prigioni (6)	Madison Square Garden; 19,033	42–26
69	March 26	@ Boston	W 100–85	J.R. Smith (32)	Carmelo Anthony (8)	Pablo Prigioni (5)	TD Garden; 18,624	43–26
70	March 27	Memphis	W 108–101	J.R. Smith (35)	Carmelo Anthony (7)	Raymond Felton (4)	Madison Square Garden; 19,033	44–26
71	March 29	Charlotte	W 111–102	J.R. Smith (37)	Carmelo Anthony (11)	Iman Shumpert (5)	Madison Square Garden; 19,033	45–26
72	March 31	Boston	W 108–89	Carmelo Anthony (24)	J.R. Smith (12)	Pablo Prigioni (5)	Madison Square Garden; 19,033	46–26

April: 8–2 (home: 4–0; road: 4–2)

Game	Date	Team	Score	High points	High rebounds	High assists	Location Attendance	Record
73	April 2	@ Miami	W 102–90	Carmelo Anthony (50)	Kenyon Martin (6)	Raymond Felton (9)	American Airlines Arena; 20,300	47–26
74	April 3	@ Atlanta	W 95–82	Carmelo Anthony (40)	Kenyon Martin (9)	Jason Kidd (7)	Philips Arena; 17,404	48–26
75	April 5	Milwaukee	W 101–83	Carmelo Anthony (41)	Carmelo Anthony (14)	Felton & Prigioni (4)	Madison Square Garden; 19,033	49–26
76	April 7	@ Oklahoma City	W 125–120	Carmelo Anthony (36)	Carmelo Anthony (12)	Raymond Felton (8)	Chesapeake Energy Arena; 18,203	50–26
77	April 9	Washington	W 120–99	Carmelo Anthony (36)	Chris Copeland (9)	Raymond Felton (8)	Madison Square Garden; 19,033	51–26
78	April 11	@ Chicago	L 111–118 (OT)	Carmelo Anthony (36)	Carmelo Anthony (19)	Raymond Felton (6)	United Center; 22,464	51–27
79	April 12	@ Cleveland	W 101–91	Anthony & Smith (31)	Carmelo Anthony (14)	Pablo Prigioni (4)	Quicken Loans Arena; 19,430	52–27
80	April 14	Indiana	W 90–80	Carmelo Anthony (25)	J.R. Smith (8)	Jason Kidd (5)	Madison Square Garden; 19,033	53–27
81	April 15	@ Charlotte	L 95–106	Chris Copeland (32)	Copeland, Novak, & White (7)	Pablo Prigioni (8)	Time Warner Cable Arena; 15,238	53–28
82	April 17	Atlanta	W 98–92	Chris Copeland (33)	Earl Barron (18)	Iman Shumpert (8)	Madison Square Garden; 19,033	54–28

2012–13 season schedule

=== Playoffs ===
2013 playoff game log
First Round: 4–2 (home: 2–1; road: 2–1)

Game	Date	Team	Score	High points	High rebounds	High assists	Location Attendance	Series
1	April 20	Boston	W 85–78	Carmelo Anthony (36)	Kenyon Martin (9)	Raymond Felton (6)	Madison Square Garden; 19,033	1–0
2	April 23	Boston	W 87–71	Carmelo Anthony (34)	Kenyon Martin (11)	Pablo Prigioni (5)	Madison Square Garden; 19,033	2–0
3	April 26	@ Boston	W 90–76	Carmelo Anthony (26)	Chandler & Shumpert (8)	Raymond Felton (10)	TD Garden; 18,624	3–0
4	April 28	@ Boston	L 90–97 (OT)	Carmelo Anthony (36)	Iman Shumpert (12)	Raymond Felton (3)	TD Garden; 18,624	3–1
5	May 1	Boston	L 86–92	Carmelo Anthony (22)	Tyson Chandler (11)	Raymond Felton (4)	Madison Square Garden; 19,033	3–2
6	May 3	@ Boston	W 88–80	Carmelo Anthony (21)	Tyson Chandler (12)	Raymond Felton (7)	TD Garden; 18,624	4–2

Conference Semifinals: 2–4 (home: 2–1; road: 0–3)

Game	Date	Team	Score	High points	High rebounds	High assists	Location Attendance	Series
1	May 5	Indiana	L 95–105	Carmelo Anthony (27)	Carmelo Anthony (11)	Pablo Prigioni (6)	Madison Square Garden; 19,033	0–1
2	May 7	Indiana	W 105–79	Carmelo Anthony (32)	Carmelo Anthony (9)	Kidd & Prigioni (4)	Madison Square Garden; 19,033	1–1
3	May 11	@ Indiana	L 71–82	Carmelo Anthony (21)	Iman Shumpert (10)	Pablo Prigioni (4)	Bankers Life Fieldhouse; 18,165	1–2
4	May 14	@ Indiana	L 82–93	Carmelo Anthony (24)	Tyson Chandler (10)	Raymond Felton (6)	Bankers Life Fieldhouse; 18,165	1–3
5	May 16	Indiana	W 85–75	Carmelo Anthony (28)	Tyson Chandler (8)	Raymond Felton (4)	Madison Square Garden; 19,033	2–3
6	May 18	@ Indiana	L 99–106	Carmelo Anthony (39)	J.R. Smith (10)	Felton & Prigioni (6)	Bankers Life Fieldhouse; 18,165	2–4

2013 playoff schedule

== Player statistics ==
Legend
GP	Games played	GS	Games started	MPG	Minutes per game
FG%	Field-goal percentage	3P%	3-point field-goal percentage	FT%	Free-throw percentage
RPG	Rebounds per game	APG	Assists per game	SPG	Steals per game
BPG	Blocks per game	PPG	Points per game

Player	GP	GS	MPG	FG%	3P%	FT%	RPG	APG	SPG	BPG	PPG
Carmelo Anthony	67	67	37.0	.451	.384	.830	6.9	2.6	0.77	0.48	28.7
Marcus Camby	24	4	10.4	.321	.000	.421	3.3	0.6	0.29	0.58	1.8
Tyson Chandler	66	66	32.8	.637	.000	.694	10.7	0.9	0.64	1.14	10.4
Chris Copeland	56	13	15.4	.478	.425	.778	1.4	2	0.4	0.16	7.4
Raymond Felton	68	68	34.0	.425	.353	.789	2.8	5.5	1.42	0.18	14.0
Jason Kidd	76	48	26.9	.379	.358	.833	4.2	3.30	1.67	0.33	6.2
Kenyon Martin	18	11	23.9	.602	.000	.425	3.3	0.4	0.89	0.94	7.2
Steve Novak	81	1	20.3	.414	.424	.938	2.0	0.4	0.37	0.10	6.6
Pablo Prigioni	78	18	16.2	.440	.376	.909	1.8	3.0	0.90	0.01	3.3
Iman Shumpert	45	45	22.1	.378	.411	.686	2.6	1.4	1.03	0.12	6.1
J. R. Smith	80	0	33.5	.415	.352	.785	5.1	2.7	1.27	0.31	17.7
Amar'e Stoudemire	29	0	23.5	.577	.000	.808	5.0	0.4	0.34	0.72	14.2
Kurt Thomas	39	17	10.1	.542	1.000	.462	2.3	0.5	0.26	0.41	2.5
Rasheed Wallace	21	0	14.1	.388	.324	.700	4.2	0.3	0.65	0.75	7.2
James White	57	16	7.6	.420	.345	.429	0.7	0.4	0.18	0.06	1.8

== Awards, records, and milestones ==
=== Awards ===
==== Week/Month ====
- On December 3, 2012 Carmelo Anthony was named the Eastern Conference Player of the week for November 26 to December 2.
- On April 1, 2013 J.R. Smith was named the Eastern Conference Player of the week for March 25 to April 1.
- On April 8, 2013 Carmelo Anthony was named the Eastern Conference Player of the week for April 1 to April 7.
- On April 15, 2013 Carmelo Anthony was named the Eastern Conference Player of the week for April 8 to April 14, his second consecutive (3rd overall) week winning the award.

==== All-Star ====
- Carmelo Anthony was voted as a starter to the 2013 NBA All-Star Game (6th Selection).
- Tyson Chandler was voted as a reserve to the 2013 NBA All-Star Game (1st Selection).

=== Records ===
- Carmelo Anthony set a franchise record of 31 consecutive games played with 20+ points, lasting from November 16 against the Grizzlies and ending on February 2 against the Kings.
- Tyson Chandler tied the franchise record (previously set by Willis Reed in 1969) of 3 consecutive games played with 20+ rebounds against the Bucks, Kings, and Pistons in games played on February 1 through February 4.
- Carmelo Anthony tied the franchise record of 5 consecutive games played with 35+ points (previously set by Bernard King in 1985) in games played April 2 through April 9.
- The Knicks tied the franchise record of 20 3-point shots made in a game on April 9 against the Washington Wizards.
- After the Knicks beat the Oklahoma City Thunder on April 7, coach Mike Woodson improved to 68–32 as Knicks head coach, the best 100 game mark in franchise history.
- The Knicks set new NBA records of 891 3-point shots made and 2371 3-point shots attempted in a season.

=== Milestones ===
- On February 8, 2013 Jason Kidd broke the 12,000 career assist mark against the Minnesota Timberwolves.

== Transactions ==
=== Overview ===
Players Added

Via draft

- Kostas Papanikolaou

Via free agency

- Jason Kidd
- James White
- Kenyon Martin
- Quentin Richardson
- Earl Barron
- Chris Copeland
- Pablo Prigioni
- Rasheed Wallace
- 4/12 – Solomon Jones

Via trade

- Marcus Camby
- Raymond Felton
Players Lost

Via trade

- Toney Douglas
- Josh Harrellson
- Jerome Jordan
- Dan Gadzuric
- Jared Jeffries
- Kostas Papanikolaou
- Giorgos Printezis
- 2/21 – Ronnie Brewer

Via free agency

- Landry Fields
- Jeremy Lin

Waived

- 4/12 – Kurt Thomas
- 4/15 – Solomon Jones
- 4/17 – Rasheed Wallace

=== Free Agency ===
Additions
Player	Date Signed	Former team
Jason Kidd	July 11	Dallas Mavericks
James White	July 11	Scavolini Pesaro
Steve Novak	July 11	Re-signed
J. R. Smith	July 11	Re-signed
Pablo Prigioni	July 24	Saski Baskonia
Ronnie Brewer	July 25	Chicago Bulls
Rasheed Wallace	September 28	Boston Celtics
Kenyon Martin	February 23	Los Angeles Clippers
Solomon Jones	April 12	Liaoning Hengye Jaguars
Quentin Richardson	April 15	Orlando Magic
Earl Barron	April 17	Washington Wizards

Subtractions
Player	Date	New Team	Type
Landry Fields	July 14	Toronto Raptors	RFA | Offer Sheet
Jeremy Lin	July 18	Houston Rockets	RFA | Offer Sheet
Ronnie Brewer	February 21	Oklahoma City Thunder	Traded
Kurt Thomas	April 12	-	Waived
Solomon Jones	April 15	-	Waived
Rasheed Wallace	April 17	-	Retired/Waived

=== Trades ===
July 11, 2012	To New York Knicks Marcus Camby (sign and trade)	To Houston Rockets Toney Douglas; Josh Harrellson; Jerome Jordan; 2014 second-round pick 2015 second-round pick
July 14, 2012	To New York Knicks Raymond Felton (sign and trade); Kurt Thomas	To Portland Trail Blazers Jared Jeffries (sign and trade); Dan Gadzuric; Kostas Papanikolaou; Draft rights to Georgios Printezis; 2016 second-round pick
February 21, 2013	To New York Knicks 2014 second-round pick Cash Considerations	To Oklahoma City Thunder Ronnie Brewer

== See also ==
- 2012–13 NBA season

== Notes ==
- The Knicks started off 6–0, their best start since the 1993–94 season.
- The Knicks went 11–4 in November, the first time they won 11 games in a month since March 2000.
- The Knicks went 12–6 in March, the first time they won 12 games in a month since March 1994.
- The Knicks won 50 games for the first time since the 1999–2000 season.
- The Knicks won the Atlantic Division title for the first time since the 1993–94 season.
- The Knicks had a 13-game winning streak from March 18 to April 9, the third longest in franchise history, and the longest since the 1993–94 season had a 15-game winning streak.
