= Orlando Johnson =

American basketball player (born 1989)

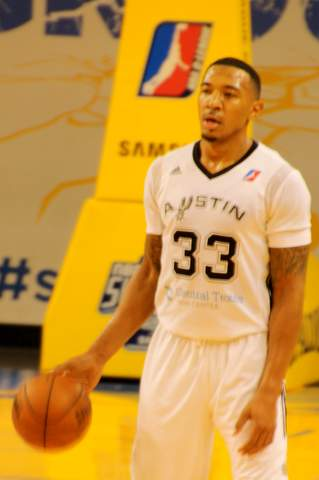
- Johnson with the Austin Spurs in 2016

Washington State Cougars
- Title: Assistant coach
- League: West Coast Conference

Personal information
- Born: March 11, 1989 (age 37) Monterey, California, U.S.
- Listed height: 6 ft 5 in (1.96 m)
- Listed weight: 220 lb (100 kg)

Career information
- High school: Palma (Salinas, California)
- College: Loyola Marymount (2007–2008); UC Santa Barbara (2009–2012)
- NBA draft: 2012: 2nd round, 36th overall pick
- Drafted by: Sacramento Kings
- Playing career: 2012–2024
- Position: Shooting guard / small forward
- Number: 0, 1, 3, 11, 33

Career history

Playing
- 2012–2014: Indiana Pacers
- 2012–2014: →Fort Wayne Mad Ants
- 2014: Sacramento Kings
- 2014: Laboral Kutxa
- 2014–2016: Austin Spurs
- 2015: Barangay Ginebra San Miguel
- 2016: Phoenix Suns
- 2016: New Orleans Pelicans
- 2016: Guangxi Rhinos
- 2016–2017: UNICS Kazan
- 2017: Austin Spurs
- 2017: Al Riyadi Club Beirut
- 2018: Igokea
- 2019: Pauian
- 2019–2020: Avtodor Saratov
- 2020–2021: Brisbane Bullets
- 2022: San Miguel Beermen
- 2022: Metros de Santiago
- 2022–2023: Club Atlético Aguada
- 2023: Héroes de Falcón
- 2023: Henan Golden Elephants
- 2024: Zavkhan Brothers

Coaching
- 2025–present: Washington State (assistant)

Career highlights
- Bosnian and Herzegovinan Cup champion (2018); Lebanese League champion (2017); NBA D-League All-Star (2016); Big West Player of the Year (2010); AP Honorable Mention All-American (2010); 3× First-team All-Big West (2010–2012)
- Stats at NBA.com
- Stats at Basketball Reference

Orlando Vincent Johnson (born March 11, 1989) is an American basketball coach, administrator, and former professional player. He played college basketball for Loyola Marymount and UC Santa Barbara.

== College career ==
Johnson, a 6'5 shooting guard from Palma High School in Salinas, California, first played collegiately at Loyola Marymount. As a freshman in the 2007–08 season, Johnson averaged 12.4 points and 4.9 rebounds per game, leading the Lions in both categories. Following a coaching change at LMU, Johnson transferred to UCSB.

After sitting out the 2008–09 season per NCAA transfer rules, Johnson made an instant impact in the Big West Conference for the Gauchos, averaging 18 points and 5.9 rebounds per game. Johnson also led the Gauchos to the 2010 Big West Conference men's basketball tournament title and an NCAA appearance. Following the season, he was named the Big West conference player of the year and an honorable mention All-American by the Associated Press.

As a junior in 2010–11, Johnson averaged 21.1 points and 6.2 rebounds per game and was again named first team All-Big West. He also led the Gauchos to another conference tournament title and NCAA tournament appearance, again earning Big West tournament MVP honors.

Following his junior season, Johnson declared himself eligible for the 2011 NBA draft, but opted to return to UCSB for his senior season.

=== National team career ===
Following his junior season at UCSB, Johnson was chosen to represent the United States as a member of Team USA at the 2011 World University Games in Shenzhen, China. He played in all eight matches of the tournament, averaging 7.3 points and 3.9 rebounds per game as the team finished 7–1.

Prior to the start of his senior season, Johnson was named to the preseason watch lists for the Wooden Award, Naismith Award, and the Lowe's Senior CLASS Award.

== Professional career ==
=== Indiana Pacers (2012–2014) ===
Johnson was selected with the 36th overall pick in the 2012 NBA draft by the Sacramento Kings. He was immediately traded to the Indiana Pacers. On July 12, 2012, he signed a multi-year deal with the Pacers. On March 23, 2013, he scored a season-high 15 points in a win over the Atlanta Hawks. During his rookie season, he had multiple assignments with the Fort Wayne Mad Ants of the NBA Development League.

On February 6, 2014, he was reassigned to the Mad Ants. On February 13, 2014, he was recalled by the Pacers. On February 20, 2014, he was waived by the Pacers.

=== Sacramento Kings (2014) ===
On February 26, 2014, Johnson signed a 10-day contract with the Sacramento Kings. On March 8, 2014, he signed a second 10-day contract with the Kings. On March 18, 2014, the Kings did not offer him a rest of season contract.

=== Laboral Kutxa Vitoria (2014) ===
On August 14, 2014, Johnson signed a one-year deal with the Spanish team Laboral Kutxa Vitoria. On October 28, 2014, he was released by Laboral after appearing in just six games.

=== Austin Spurs and Barangay Ginebra San Miguel (2014–2016) ===
On December 3, 2014, he was acquired by the Austin Spurs of the NBA Development League.

On April 29, 2015, Johnson signed with Barangay Ginebra San Miguel of the Philippine Basketball Association. In 12 games for Barangay, he averaged 33.7 points and 11.3 rebounds per game.

On October 30, 2015, Johnson was reacquired by the Austin Spurs. On January 29, 2016, he was named in the West All-Star team for the 2016 NBA D-League All-Star Game.

=== Return to the NBA (2016) ===
On February 5, 2016, Johnson signed a 10-day contract with the Phoenix Suns. He made his debut for the Suns the following day, recording seven points, one rebound and one steal in 19 minutes of action against the Utah Jazz. On February 10, he recorded 9 points, a career-high 8 rebounds and a career-high 3 blocks in a loss to the Golden State Warriors. On February 15, the Suns did not renew his contract, making him a free agent. Five days later, Johnson returned to the Austin Spurs, recording 17 points, eight rebounds, six assists and three steals in 43 minutes that night against the Oklahoma City Blue in a 96–94 win.

On March 9, 2016, Johnson signed a 10-day contract with the New Orleans Pelicans to help the team deal with numerous injuries. New Orleans had to use an NBA hardship exemption in order to sign him as he made their roster stand at 16, one over the allowed limited of 15. That night, he made his debut for the Pelicans in a 122–113 loss to the Charlotte Hornets, recording five points and three rebounds in 20 minutes as a starter. On March 20, the Pelicans did not renew his contract, making him a free agent. The next day, he returned to Austin.

=== Guangxi Rhinos (2016) ===
In July 2016, Johnson joined the Guangxi Rhinos of the Chinese National Basketball League. He helped the team reach the quarter-final round of the league but fell short of advancing to the semi-final stage after losing to Henan Roaring Elephants. In six games for Guangxi, he averaged 36.5 points, 7.5 rebounds, 4.8 assists and 1.2 steals per game.

=== UNICS Kazan (2016–2017) ===
On September 8, 2016, Johnson signed with the Milwaukee Bucks, but was waived on October 22 after appearing in five preseason games. On November 1, he signed a three-month deal with the Russian team UNICS Kazan.

=== Austin Spurs (2017) ===
On March 2, 2017, Johnson was acquired by the Austin Spurs of the NBA Development League, returning to the franchise for a third stint.

=== Al Riyadi Beirut (2017) ===
On April 8, 2017, Johnson signed with Sporting Al Riyadi Beirut of the Lebanese Basketball League.

=== Igokea (2018) ===
On September 18, 2018, Johnson signed with Igokea of the Bosnian League. He had 18 points and 5 assists in his debut in the ABA Super Cup. Johnson was cut on October 6, 2018, after not recovering from a knee injury.

=== Pauian (2019) ===
On January 3, 2019, Johnson was reported to be added to roster of the Pauian of the Super Basketball League (SBL). On January 4, Johnson made his debut for the Pauian and scored 28 points with five rebounds, five assists, a steal and a block in an 87–73 win over the Yulon Luxgen Dinos.

=== Avtodor Saratov (2019–2020) ===
On August 19, 2019, Johnson signed with Avtodor Saratov of the VTB United League.

=== Brisbane Bullets (2020–2021) ===
On November 16, 2020, Johnson signed with the Brisbane Bullets of the Australian National Basketball League (NBL). He was released by the Bullets on March 17, 2021.

=== San Miguel Beermen (2022) ===
On December 30, 2021, Johnson signed with the San Miguel Beermen of the Philippine Basketball Association (PBA).

=== Zavkhan Brothers (2024) ===
In October 2024, Johnson joined the Zavkhan Brothers of The League.

On January 10, 2025, Johnson retired from professional basketball.

== Coaching career ==
In June 2025, Johnson was hired by his childhood friend David Riley to be the general manager and assistant coach for Washington State University.

== Personal life ==
Johnson's mother was murdered when he was one year old, and the grandmother who took him in watched her house burn down six years later. Four more of Johnson's family members perished in that blaze, and his grandmother died when he was 11. Johnson's two older brothers raised him afterwards and ensured that Johnson graduated from college.

== NBA career statistics ==
Legend
GP	Games played	GS	Games started	MPG	Minutes per game
FG%	Field goal percentage	3P%	3-point field goal percentage	FT%	Free throw percentage
RPG	Rebounds per game	APG	Assists per game	SPG	Steals per game
BPG	Blocks per game	PPG	Points per game	**Bold**	Career high

=== Regular season ===
Year	Team	GP	GS	MPG	FG%	3P%	FT%	RPG	APG	SPG	BPG	PPG
2012–13	Indiana	**51**	0	12.1	**.400**	**.383**	.719	2.2	**0.9**	.2	.2	4.0
2013–14	Indiana	38	0	9.0	.344	.195	.773	1.3	.4	.2	.0	2.4
2013–14	Sacramento	7	0	7.1	.176	.167	.500	.6	.6	.0	.1	1.3
2015–16	Phoenix	2	0	**23.5**	.294	.200	**.833**	**4.5**	.0	**1.0**	**1.5**	**8.0**
2015–16	New Orleans	5	**1**	10.8	.235	.200	.500	1.2	.4	.2	.0	2.0
Career		103	1	10.8	.358	.311	.727	1.7	0.7	.2	.1	3.2

=== Playoffs ===
Year	Team	GP	GS	MPG	FG%	3P%	FT%	RPG	APG	SPG	BPG	PPG
2013	Indiana	12	0	2.3	.182	.333	.556	0.3	.1	.0	.0	0.8
Career		12	0	2.3	.182	.333	.556	0.3	.1	.0	.0	0.8
