= Ben Hansbrough =

American basketball player and coach (born 1987)

Personal information
- Born: December 23, 1987 (age 38) Poplar Bluff, Missouri, U.S.
- Listed height: 6 ft 3 in (1.91 m)
- Listed weight: 203 lb (92 kg)

Career information
- High school: Poplar Bluff (Poplar Bluff, Missouri)
- College: Mississippi State (2006–2008); Notre Dame (2009–2011)
- NBA draft: 2011: undrafted
- Playing career: 2011–2015
- Position: Point guard / shooting guard
- Number: 23

Career history
- 2011: Bayern Munich
- 2011–2012: Krka Novo Mesto
- 2012–2013: Indiana Pacers
- 2013–2014: Gran Canaria
- 2014: Grand Rapids Drive
- 2014–2015: Laboral Kutxa

Career highlights
- Consensus second-team All-American (2011); Big East Player of the Year (2011); First-team All-Big East (2011); Mr. Show-Me Basketball (2006)
- Stats at NBA.com
- Stats at Basketball Reference

Ben Hansbrough (born December 23, 1987) is an American former professional basketball player and a former assistant coach for Western Kentucky University. He resigned from WKU on October 16, 2017. He is the younger brother of former NBA player Tyler Hansbrough.

== College career ==
Hansbrough began his career at Mississippi State University and was a standout for two seasons before transferring to Notre Dame. Hansbrough, who is 6'3" and weighs 203 pounds (92 kg) averaged 12.0 points per game during his career at Notre Dame. In his final season at Notre Dame, Hansbrough averaged 18.4 points and 4.3 assists per game, and was named to the All-Big East team; he was the lone unanimous pick for it. He also was chosen as the 2010–11 Big East Player of the Year. He was picked to the Second Team All-America by Fox Sports.

== Professional career ==
On June 27, 2011, he signed a one-year contract with Bayern Munich in Germany. During his time in Germany, he struggled to get playing time and was released on December 23. Not long after being released, he signed with Krka Novo Mesto of Slovenia. In January 2012, he left Krka Novo Mesto for personal reasons on his part.

He played for the Indiana Pacers in the 2012 Orlando Summer League, where in 5 games he averaged 6.0ppg, 1.6apg, 1.0rpg. On September 18, 2012, he signed a non-guaranteed contract with the Pacers for the 2012–13 NBA season, joining his brother Tyler. Hansbrough played in 28 games for the Pacers that season, averaging 2.0 points and 0.8 assists.

In August 2013, he signed a one-year deal with Gran Canaria.

On September 26, 2014, he signed with the Chicago Bulls. However, he was later waived by the Bulls on October 18, 2014. On November 1, 2014, he was selected by the Grand Rapids Drive with the fifth overall pick in the 2014 NBA Development League Draft. On December 9, 2014, he was waived by the Drive per his request. On December 29, 2014, he signed with Laboral Kutxa Baskonia of Spain for the rest of the season.

== Post-playing career ==
On August 24, 2015, Western Kentucky announced Hansbrough had joined their staff as Coordinator of Player Development. On June 19, 2017, he was promoted to assistant coach for the 2017-18 season.

Hansbrough announced his resignation from WKU in October 2017. He now is a husband and father of three children to wife Loryn Bush (Hansbrough*) sister of infamous YouTuber Brooke Epps; Kids (Oldest to youngest) Benji Hansborough, Leighton Hansborough, and Richmond Hansborough.

In 2019 Hansbrough co-founded a Real Estate Development company named Oliver and Hansbrough Development LLC located in Alvaton, Kentucky

== Career statistics ==
Legend
GP	Games played	GS	Games started	MPG	Minutes per game
FG%	Field goal percentage	3P%	3-point field goal percentage	FT%	Free throw percentage
RPG	Rebounds per game	APG	Assists per game	SPG	Steals per game
BPG	Blocks per game	PPG	Points per game	**Bold**	Career high

=== NBA ===
==== Regular season ====
Year	Team	GP	GS	MPG	FG%	3P%	FT%	RPG	APG	SPG	BPG	PPG
2012–13	Indiana	28	0	7.1	.333	.261	.778	.6	1.0	.3	.1	2.0

==== Playoffs ====
Year	Team	GP	GS	MPG	FG%	3P%	FT%	RPG	APG	SPG	BPG	PPG
2013	Indiana	6	0	3.7	.000	.000	–	.5	.5	.0	.2	.0

=== Euroleague ===
Year	Team	GP	GS	MPG	FG%	3P%	FT%	RPG	APG	SPG	BPG	PPG	PIR
2014–15	Laboral Kutxa	12	1	12.4	.323	.273	.500	1.4	0.8	0.4	0.0	2.3	0.8
Career		12	1	12.4	.323	.273	.500	1.4	0.8	0.4	0.0	2.3	0.8
