= Jodie Meeks =

American basketball player (born 1987)

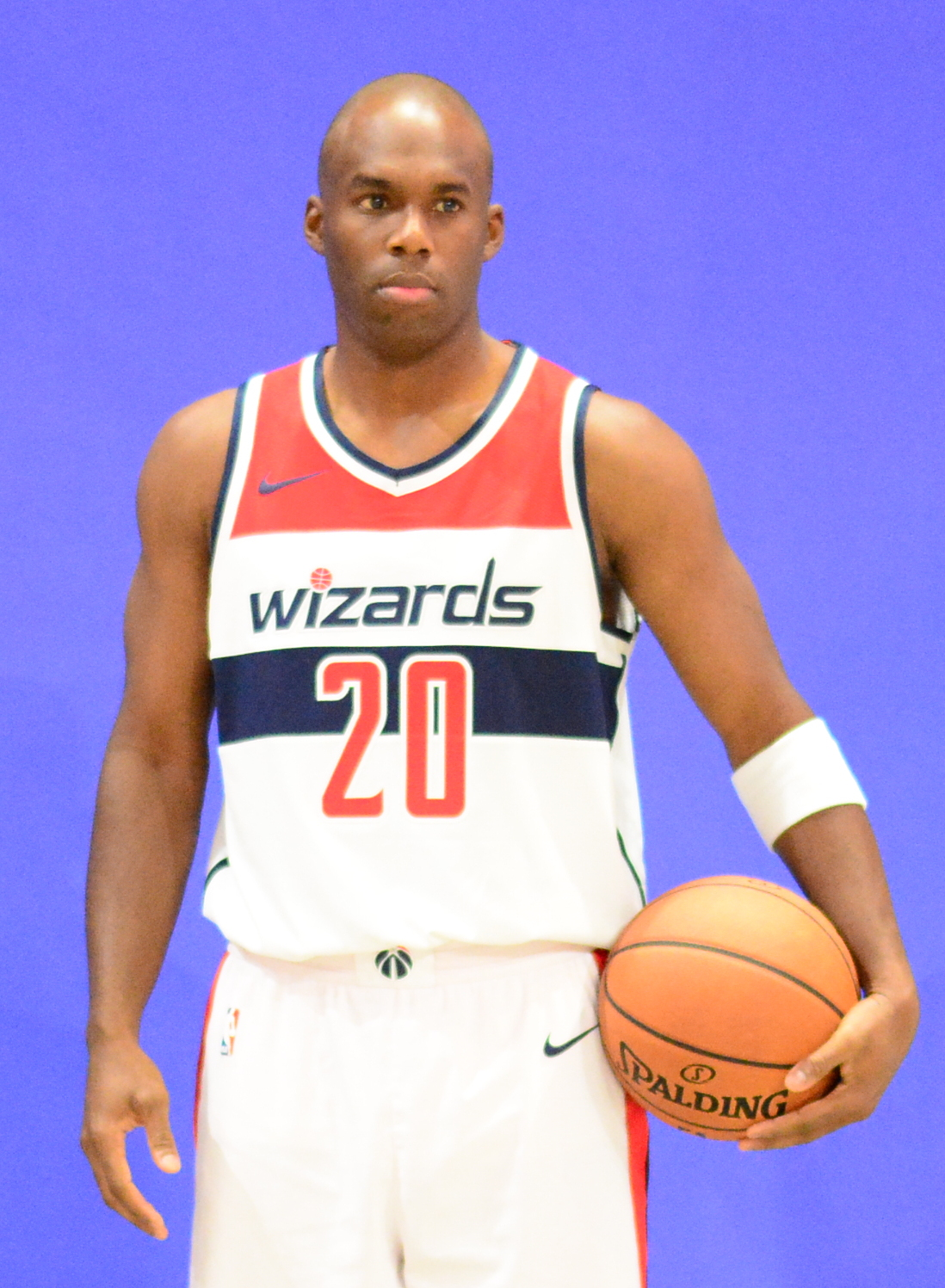
- Meeks with the Washington Wizards in 2018

New Orleans Pelicans
- Title: Assistant coach
- League: NBA

Personal information
- Born: August 21, 1987 (age 39) Nashville, Tennessee, U.S.
- Listed height: 6 ft 4 in (1.93 m)
- Listed weight: 210 lb (95 kg)

Career information
- High school: Norcross (Norcross, Georgia)
- College: Kentucky (2006–2009)
- NBA draft: 2009: 2nd round, 41st overall pick
- Drafted by: Milwaukee Bucks
- Playing career: 2009–2022
- Position: Shooting guard
- Number: 23, 20
- Coaching career: 2022–present

Career history

Playing
- 2009–2010: Milwaukee Bucks
- 2010–2012: Philadelphia 76ers
- 2012–2014: Los Angeles Lakers
- 2014–2016: Detroit Pistons
- 2016–2017: Orlando Magic
- 2017–2018: Washington Wizards
- 2019: Toronto Raptors
- 2022: Raptors 905

Coaching
- 2022–2024: Birmingham Squadron (assistant)
- 2024–present: New Orleans Pelicans (assistant)

Career highlights
- NBA champion (2019); Consensus second-team All-American (2009); First-team All-SEC (2009)

Career NBA statistics
- Points: 4,988 (9.3 ppg)
- Rebounds: 1,120 (2.1 rpg)
- Assists: 583 (1.1 apg)
- Stats at NBA.com
- Stats at Basketball Reference
Medals
Men's basketball
Representing United States
FIBA AmeriCup
Bronze medal – third place	2022 Brazil

Orestes Jodie Meeks II (born August 21, 1987) is an American professional basketball coach and former player who is an assistant coach for the New Orleans Pelicans of the National Basketball Association (NBA). He played college basketball for the University of Kentucky. On January 13, 2009, he gained national recognition by breaking the Kentucky single-game scoring record with 54 points in a nationally televised game on ESPN against Tennessee. In the same game, he broke the university's single-game three-point record by making 10 three-pointers. Meeks won the 2019 NBA championship as a member of the Toronto Raptors. In 2024, Meeks was inducted into the University of Kentucky Athletics Hall of Fame.

== Early life ==
Meeks attended Norcross High School, which he led to its first state basketball championship in 2006 under coach Eddie Martin. During his senior high school season, Meeks averaged 23.6 points per game during the regular season and 28.3 points per game during the state playoffs. Meeks was named the 2006 Atlanta Journal-Constitution Player of the Year. He was also named 2006 Gwinnett Daily Post Player of the Year, 2006 Atlanta Tipoff Club Metro Player of the Year and Player of the Month (February 2006). He was named to the Georgia High School Association (GHSA) All Star Team and led the North Team to its first victory in over three years. He was named the North Squads' MVP. He was also named to the All Tournament Team at Bob Gibbons, Kingwood, The Main Event (Las Vegas), Chick-Fil-A, and Dell Curry's Bojangles tournament. Also, he was named to the 2006 Kentucky Derby Classic all-star game and played with many of his future Kentucky teammates on April 15, 2006, against rival Louisville recruits.

Considered a four-star recruit by Rivals.com, Meeks was listed as the No. 7 shooting guard and the No. 39 player in the nation in 2006.

== College career ==
=== Freshman season ===
Meeks made his college debut on November 2, 2006, in an exhibition game against Lindsey Wilson College at Rupp Arena coming off the bench. He finished the game with 17 points, 4 rebounds and 5 assists. He was named CBS/Chevrolet Player of the Game during the nationally televised game against Louisville in Freedom Hall, after pouring in a career-high 18 points in the Wildcats' win over Louisville on December 16, 2006. He was named the Southeastern Conference (SEC) Freshman of the Week three times during his freshman season. Meeks was a unanimous selection to the SEC All-Freshman team. He was also recognized among America's best freshman selected by The Collegeinsider.com to the Freshmen All-America team. The Freshmen All-America team consists of 16 players selected by Division I coaches and NBA scouts.

=== Sophomore season ===
Expectations were high for Meeks coming into his sophomore season, and it appeared that Meeks was going to match those expectations after scoring 34 points in an exhibition game against Pikeville College. However, injury limited him to 11 games that season. On April 2, it was announced that Meeks was diagnosed with a sports hernia.

=== Junior season ===
On November 15, 2008, during the season-opener against Virginia Military Institute, Meeks scored 39 points, but the Wildcats lost 111–103. On November 28, Meeks scored 37 points in the Findlay Invitational tournament in Las Vegas against the Kansas State Wildcats. Kentucky would go on to win the tournament. Meeks had more points than the whole Kansas State team combined at half-time of that game. On December 20, Meeks scored a then-career high 46 points against Appalachian State at the annual home game for the Wildcats at Freedom Hall in Louisville. He tied former Kentucky Wildcat, Tony Delk's record for most three-pointers in a game with 9. He set a record for the most points scored by a Wildcat in Freedom Hall with 46. He followed that performance two days later by scoring 32 points in just 28 minutes against Tennessee State University. Meeks and teammate Patrick Patterson are among UK's more productive pairs of teammates since the days of Dan Issel and Mike Pratt in the early 1970s.

On January 13, 2009, Meeks broke Kentucky's single-game scoring record (formerly held by Dan Issel) by scoring 54 points in a 90–72 win against rival Tennessee. In that game he also broke Tony Delk's single-game record, which he had shared, for three-pointers by making 10 of 15 attempts and was 14 of 14 from the free throw line.

On February 11, 2009, Meeks made the game-winning three-point shot with 4.7 seconds left against the Florida Gators. Meeks would again break the 40-point margin on February 14, scoring 45 points against the Arkansas Razorbacks team, a performance that produced the most points scored in a game by an individual at Bud Walton Arena. Meeks also broke the record for most 3-pointers in a season at UK, with 117.

Meeks was named a unanimous selection to the All-SEC First team during his junior season and was the first player since Chuck Hayes in 2004–05 to be named AP First Team All-SEC. He was named the United States Basketball Writers Association (USBWA) District IV Player of the Year. Meeks was named a Second Team All-American by the Associated Press (AP), the United States Basketball Writers Association (USBWA), the National Association of Basketball Coaches (NABC), and by Sporting News.com. Meeks was a consensus Second Team All-American in 2008–09.

On May 10, 2014, Meeks returned to Rupp Arena in Lexington, KY to receive his degree in business marketing. Since being drafted by the Milwaukee Bucks in 2009, Meeks had been attending classes in the off-season at the University of Kentucky. On receiving his diploma, Meeks said: "You never know how long your career will last. Once you have a degree, you have it forever."

== Professional career ==
=== Milwaukee Bucks (2009–2010) ===
On April 7, 2009, Meeks declared his eligibility for the 2009 NBA draft and his intention to not hire an agent, leaving open the possibility of returning to Kentucky next season. In a May 28 story, Meeks stated in reference to his desire to be a first round NBA draft pick, "If I'm not first round, then I'll go back to school." On June 15, 2009, Meeks decided to stay in the draft and forgo his final season of eligibility at Kentucky. During the 2009 NBA draft on June 25, 2009, Meeks was drafted 41st overall by the Milwaukee Bucks. Stuck behind a deep guard rotation, Meeks struggled to receive playing time from Head Coach Scott Skiles.

=== Philadelphia 76ers (2010–2012) ===
On February 18, 2010, Meeks was traded to the Philadelphia 76ers along with Francisco Elson in exchange for Primoz Brezec and Royal Ivey. Meeks finished his rookie season without a start, failing to gain more minutes in then-Sixers coach Eddie Jordan's rotation than he did in Milwaukee.

Entering his second year, Meeks was expected to play a limited role behind Sixers second overall pick Evan Turner and Lou Williams, who was the starter the previous season. Through the course of the season, however, he was named the team's starting shooting guard by new Sixers Coach Doug Collins, as Williams transitioned into a sixth man role. In just his second start, Meeks scored 26 points (20 in the first quarter), shooting 9–16 from the field, including 7–10 from long range (6–7 in the first quarter).

Meeks continued as the Sixers starting shooting guard for the 2011–12 season, though he would lose minutes to Evan Turner. On March 27, 2012, Meeks scored 31 points, a new career high.

=== Los Angeles Lakers (2012–2014) ===
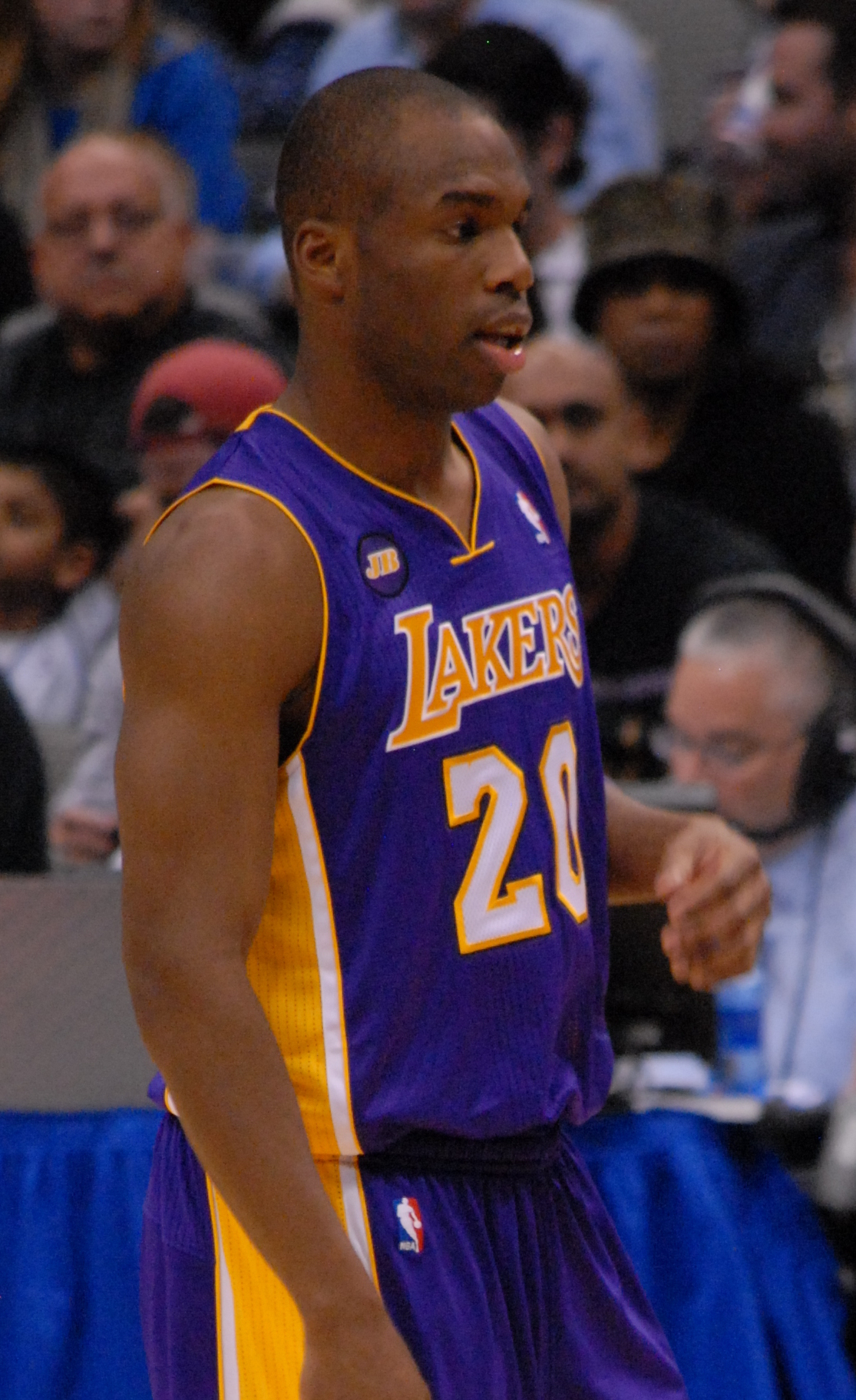
Meeks with the Los Angeles Lakers in 2013

On August 13, 2012, Meeks signed a two-year deal with the Los Angeles Lakers. On November 30, he scored 21 points on a then career-high seven three-pointers in a 122–103 win over the Denver Nuggets.

On March 9, 2014, Meeks scored a career-high 42 points in a 114–110 win over the Oklahoma City Thunder.

=== Detroit Pistons (2014–2016) ===
On July 14, 2014, Meeks signed a three-year, $19.5 million contract with the Detroit Pistons. After missing the first 22 games of the 2014–15 season with a lower back injury, Meeks made his Pistons debut on December 12, 2014, scoring 12 points off the bench in 22 minutes to help his team snap a 13-game losing streak with a 105–103 win over the Phoenix Suns.

On December 30, Meeks scored 34 points on a career-high nine three-pointers in a 109–86 win over the Orlando Magic. He came within one three-pointer of tying Joe Dumars' franchise record of ten three-pointers.

On October 30, 2015, Meeks was ruled out for 12 to 16 weeks after undergoing a surgical procedure to repair a non-displaced fracture of the fifth metatarsal in his right foot. On April 13, 2016, Meeks made his return on the season finale game against the Cavaliers, collecting 20 points in 26 minutes.

=== Orlando Magic (2016–2017) ===
On June 29, 2016, Meeks was traded to the Orlando Magic in exchange for a future conditional second-round draft pick. On July 19, 2016, he underwent surgery to stabilize the fifth metatarsal in his right foot. On September 19, 2016, he was deemed a possibility of returning to action in November. He made his debut for the Magic on December 2, 2016, after the foot injury held him out for the first 19 games of the season. He finished with 10 points and three steals in 17 minutes against the Philadelphia 76ers. On January 2, 2017, he scored a season-high 23 points in a 115–103 win over the New York Knicks. On January 19, 2017, he was ruled out for four to six weeks after dislocating the thumb on his shooting hand. An MRI exam revealed Meeks had two sprained ligaments in his right thumb. He underwent surgery to repair his right thumb five days later. He returned to action on March 20, 2017, playing against the Philadelphia 76ers after missing 26 games.

=== Washington Wizards (2017–2018) ===
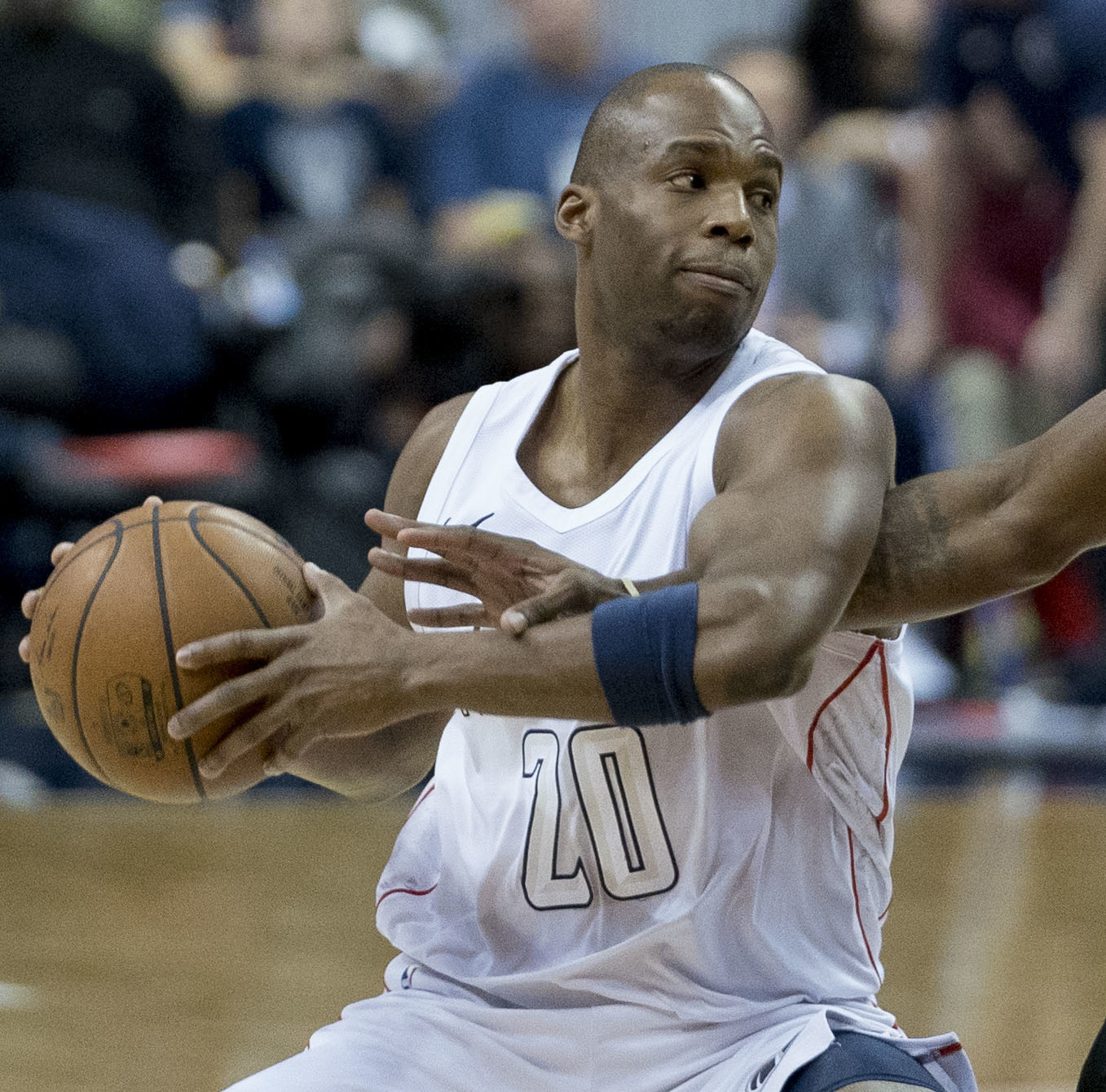
Meeks with the Washington Wizards in 2018

On July 12, 2017, Meeks signed with the Washington Wizards. On April 13, 2018, he was suspended without pay for 25 games for violating the terms of the NBA/NBPA anti-drug program, testing positive for ipamorelin and GHRP-2.

On October 15, 2018, Meeks was traded, along with a future second-round draft pick and cash, to the Milwaukee Bucks in exchange for a future second-round draft pick. Meeks' league-mandated suspension for violating the NBA/NBPA anti-drug program ended on November 24, leading to the Bucks waiving him the following day.

=== Toronto Raptors (2019) ===
On February 20, 2019, Meeks signed a 10-day contract with the Toronto Raptors. He was not signed to a second 10-day contract after the first expired. On March 26, he returned to the Raptors, signing with the team for the rest of the season. On March 30, 2019, he scored a season-high 14 points to go along with 5 rebounds in a 124–101 road win against the Bulls.

Meeks was part of the Raptors team that defeated the two-time defending champion Golden State Warriors in the 2019 NBA Finals and after six games, he became an NBA champion.

=== Raptors 905 (2022) ===
On January 10, 2022, Meeks signed with the Raptors 905 of the NBA G League. He was waived on March 18.

== National team career ==
Meeks played for the United States men's national basketball team in the 2022 FIBA AmeriCup.

== Coaching career ==
On September 15, 2022, Meeks was hired by the Birmingham Squadron as an assistant coach.

On September 26, 2024, Meeks was hired by the New Orleans Pelicans as an assistant coach.

== Player profile ==
Meeks was an offensive specialist who excelled at shooting three-point field goals, especially while trailing in transition. He was slightly undersized as a shooting guard, but was considered a solid defensive player.

== Career statistics ==
Legend
GP	Games played	GS	Games started	MPG	Minutes per game
FG%	Field goal percentage	3P%	3-point field goal percentage	FT%	Free throw percentage
RPG	Rebounds per game	APG	Assists per game	SPG	Steals per game
BPG	Blocks per game	PPG	Points per game	**Bold**	Career high
†	Won an NBA championship	*	Led the league

=== NBA ===
==== Regular season ====
Year	Team	GP	GS	MPG	FG%	3P%	FT%	RPG	APG	SPG	BPG	PPG
2009–10	Milwaukee	41	0	11.9	.362	.280	.857	1.8	.5	.3	**.1**	4.1
2009–10	Philadelphia	19	0	12.3	.440	.380	.722	1.4	.9	.3	**.1**	5.9
2010–11	Philadelphia	74	64	27.9	.425	.397	.894	2.3	1.1	.9	**.1**	10.5
2011–12	Philadelphia	66*	50	24.9	.409	.365	.906	2.4	.8	.6	.0	8.4
2012–13	L.A. Lakers	**78**	10	21.3	.387	.357	.896	2.2	.9	.7	**.1**	7.9
2013–14	L.A. Lakers	77	**70**	**33.2**	.463	.401	.857	**2.5**	**1.8**	**1.4**	**.1**	**15.7**
2014–15	Detroit	60	0	24.4	.416	.349	.906	1.7	1.3	1.0	**.1**	11.1
2015–16	Detroit	3	0	14.3	.350	**.444**	**1.000**	1.7	1.0	.0	.0	7.3
2016–17	Orlando	36	10	20.5	.402	.409	.878	2.1	1.3	.9	**.1**	9.1
2017–18	Washington	77	0	14.5	.399	.343	.863	1.6	.9	.4	**.1**	6.3
2018–19†	Toronto	8	0	13.0	**.538**	**.444**	.619	1.5	1.0	.1	**.1**	6.4
Career		539	204	22.5	.420	.373	.879	2.1	1.1	.8	.1	9.3

==== Playoffs ====
Year	Team	GP	GS	MPG	FG%	3P%	FT%	RPG	APG	SPG	BPG	PPG
2011	Philadelphia	5	**5**	**25.0**	.419	**.444**	.833	**2.0**	**.8**	.6	.0	**7.8**
2012	Philadelphia	13	1	7.8	.346	.231	**1.000**	.3	.3	.2	**.1**	2.7
2013	L.A. Lakers	1	0	20.0	.250	.000	**1.000**	**2.0**	.0	**1.0**	.0	4.0
2016	Detroit	1	0	2.0	**1.000**	.000	.000	.0	.0	.0	.0	2.0
2019†	Toronto	**14**	0	4.9	.310	.154	.667	.6	.1	.3	**.1**	1.6
Career		34	6	9.3	.363	.283	.920	.7	.3	.3	.1	3.0

=== College ===
Year	Team	GP	GS	MPG	FG%	3P%	FT%	RPG	APG	SPG	BPG	PPG
2006–07	Kentucky	34	1	22.1	.419	.364	.897	2.8	1.5	.9	**.1**	8.7
2007–08	Kentucky	11	5	23.2	.307	.320	.794	2.6	1.5	.5	**.1**	8.8
2008–09	Kentucky	**36**	**36**	**34.4**	**.463**	**.406**	**.902**	**3.4**	**1.8**	**1.3**	**.1**	**23.7**
Career		81	42	27.7	.436	.386	.890	3.0	1.6	1.1	.1	15.4

== See also ==
- List of people banned or suspended by the NBA
- 2009 NCAA Men's Basketball All-Americans
