= 2012–13 Philadelphia 76ers season =

NBA professional basketball team season

- Head coach: Doug Collins
- General manager: Tony DiLeo
- Owner: Josh Harris
- Arena: Wells Fargo Center

Results
- Record: 34–48 (.415)
- Place: Division: 4th (Atlantic); Conference: 9th (Eastern)
- Playoff finish: Did not qualify
- Stats at Basketball Reference

Local media
- Television: CSN Philadelphia (74 games); Comcast Network Philadelphia (8 games)
- Radio: WPEN

The 2012–13 Philadelphia 76ers season was the 74th season of the franchise, 64th in the National Basketball Association (NBA), and the 50th in Philadelphia. Before the start of the season the team constructed a major multiple-team trade to get All-Star center Andrew Bynum from the Los Angeles Lakers (giving up eventual 2015 NBA Finals MVP Andre Iguodala). However, Bynum missed the entire regular season due to a foot injury sustained while bowling, and would never end up playing in a Sixers uniform. They finished with a record of 34–48 and would miss the postseason in Doug Collins' third and final season as head coach.

== Key dates ==
- June 28: The 2012 NBA draft took place at the Prudential Center in Newark, New Jersey.

== NBA draft ==
Round	Pick	Player	Position	Nationality	College
1	15	Maurice Harkless	SF	United States	St. John's
2	45	Justin Hamilton (traded to Miami)^{×}	C	United States	LSU
2	54	Tornike Shengelia (From Memphis, traded to Brooklyn)^{°}	PF	Georgia	Spirou Charleroi (Belgium)

^{×} Philadelphia acquired the draft rights to 27th pick Arnett Moultrie from the Miami Heat in exchange for the draft rights to 45th pick Justin Hamilton and a future first-round draft pick.
^{°} Traded draft rights to Brooklyn in exchange for cash considerations.

== Roster ==
2012-13 Philadelphia 76ers roster
Players

Pos.	No.	Player	Height	Weight	DOB	From
F/C	50	Lavoy Allen	6 ft 9 in (2.06 m)	255 lb (116 kg)	1989–02–04	Temple
C	54	Kwame Brown	6 ft 11 in (2.11 m)	290 lb (132 kg)	1982–03–10	Glynn Academy (GA)
C	33	Andrew Bynum	7 ft 0 in (2.13 m)	285 lb (129 kg)	1987–10–27	St. Joseph HS (NJ)
C	00	Spencer Hawes	7 ft 1 in (2.16 m)	245 lb (111 kg)	1988–04–28	Washington
G/F	14	Justin Holiday	6 ft 6 in (1.98 m)	185 lb (84 kg)	1989–04–05	Washington
G	11	Jrue Holiday	6 ft 4 in (1.93 m)	205 lb (93 kg)	1990–06–12	UCLA
G	7	Royal Ivey	6 ft 4 in (1.93 m)	200 lb (91 kg)	1981–12–20	Texas
G	31	Charles Jenkins	6 ft 3 in (1.91 m)	215 lb (98 kg)	1989–02–28	Hofstra
F	5	Arnett Moultrie	6 ft 10 in (2.08 m)	245 lb (111 kg)	1990–11–18	Mississippi State
G/F	23	Jason Richardson	6 ft 6 in (1.98 m)	225 lb (102 kg)	1981–01–20	Michigan State
G/F	12	Evan Turner	6 ft 7 in (2.01 m)	220 lb (100 kg)	1988–10–27	Ohio State
G/F	8	Damien Wilkins	6 ft 6 in (1.98 m)	225 lb (102 kg)	1980–01–11	Georgia
F	4	Dorell Wright	6 ft 9 in (2.06 m)	205 lb (93 kg)	1985–12–02	South Kent HS (CT)
G/F	1	Nick Young	6 ft 7 in (2.01 m)	210 lb (95 kg)	1985–06–01	USC
F	21	Thaddeus Young	6 ft 8 in (2.03 m)	235 lb (107 kg)	1988–06–21	Georgia Tech

Coaches
Head coach
- Doug Collins
Assistant(s)
- Mike Curry
- Brian James
- Aaron McKie
- Jeff Capel

Legend
- (DP) Unsigned draft pick
- (FA) Free agent
- (S) Suspended
- (DL) On assignment to
  D-League affiliate
- Injured

Roster
Updated: 2013–02–26

== Pre-season ==
2012 pre-season game log
Pre-season: 6–1 (home: 3–1; road: 3–0)

Game	Date	Team	Score	High points	High rebounds	High assists	Location Attendance	Record
1	October 11	@ Orlando	W 102–95	Jrue Holiday (27)	Lavoy Allen (8)	Maalik Wayns (6)	Amway Center; 18,106	1–0
2	October 13	Brooklyn	L 105–108 (OT)	Nick Young (21)	Lavoy Allen (8)	Jrue Holiday (9)	Boardwalk Hall; 6,887	1–1
3	October 15	Boston	W 107–75	Spencer Hawes (17)	Spencer Hawes (8)	Maalik Wayns (8)	Wells Fargo Center; 8,483	2–1
4	October 17	Cleveland	W 113–99	Nick Young, Maalik Wayns (19)	Lavoy Allen (11)	Spencer Hawes (7)	Wells Fargo Center; 8,170	3–1
5	October 19	@ Brooklyn	W 106–96	Thaddeus Young (24)	Dorell Wright (11)	Jrue Holiday (12)	Barclays Center; 13,270	4–1
6	October 21	@ Boston	W 88–79	Dorell Wright (20)	Jrue Holiday, Nick Young (6)	Jrue Holiday (5)	TD Garden; 18,624	5–1
7	October 22	New York	W 98–90	Jason Richardson (23)	Lavoy Allen (13)	Jason Richardson (6)	Carrier Dome; 8,831	6–1

2012–13 season schedule

== Regular season ==
=== Standings ===
Atlantic Division	W	L	PCT	GB	Home	Road	Div	GP
y-New York Knicks	54	28	.659	–	31–10	23–18	10–6	82
x-Brooklyn Nets	49	33	.598	5	26–15	23–18	11–5	82
x-Boston Celtics	41	40	.506	12.5	27–13	14–27	7–9	81†
Philadelphia 76ers	34	48	.415	20	23–18	11–30	7–9	82
Toronto Raptors	34	48	.415	20	21–20	13–28	5–11	82

Eastern Conference
#	Team	W	L	PCT	GB	GP
1	z-Miami Heat *	66	16	.805	–	82
2	y-New York Knicks *	54	28	.659	12.0	82
3	y-Indiana Pacers *	49	32	.605	16.5	81
4	x-Brooklyn Nets	49	33	.598	17.0	82
5	x-Chicago Bulls	45	37	.549	21.0	82
6	x-Atlanta Hawks	44	38	.537	22.0	82
7	x-Boston Celtics	41	40	.506	24.5	81
8	x-Milwaukee Bucks	38	44	.463	28.0	82
9	Philadelphia 76ers	34	48	.415	32.0	82
10	Toronto Raptors	34	48	.415	32.0	82
11	Washington Wizards	29	53	.354	37.0	82
12	Detroit Pistons	29	53	.354	37.0	82
13	Cleveland Cavaliers	24	58	.293	42.0	82
14	Charlotte Bobcats	21	61	.256	45.0	82
15	Orlando Magic	20	62	.244	46.0	82

=== Game log ===
2012–13 game log
Total: 34–48 (Home: 23–18; Road: 11–30)
October: 1–0 (home: 1–0; road: 0–0)

Game	Date	Team	Score	High points	High rebounds	High assists	Location Attendance	Record
1	October 31	Denver	W 84–75	Spencer Hawes (16)	Spencer Hawes (12)	Jrue Holiday (11)	Wells Fargo Center; 19,101	1–0

November : 9–6 (home: 5–4; road: 4–2)

Game	Date	Team	Score	High points	High rebounds	High assists	Location Attendance	Record
2	November 4	@ New York	L 84–100	Jrue Holiday (27)	Evan Turner (11)	Jrue Holiday (7)	Madison Square Garden; 19,033	1-1
3	November 5	New York	L 88–100	Jrue Holiday (17)	Thaddeus Young (10)	Jrue Holiday (8)	Wells Fargo Center; 15,783	1–2
4	November 7	@ New Orleans	W 77–62	Turner & Holiday (14)	Thaddeus Young (10)	Jrue Holiday (12)	New Orleans Arena; 12,988	2-2
5	November 9	@ Boston	W 106–100	Evan Turner (25)	Evan Turner (11)	Jrue Holiday (14)	TD Garden; 18,624	3–2
6	November 10	@ Toronto	W 93–83	Holiday, N. Young & T. Young (16)	Evan Turner (12)	Holiday & Ivey (5)	Air Canada Centre; 19,800	4–2
7	November 12	Milwaukee	L 96–105	Jrue Holiday (25)	Thaddeus Young (7)	Jrue Holiday (6)	Wells Fargo Center; 15,086	4–3
8	November 14	Detroit	L 76–94	Lavoy Allen (14)	Thaddeus Young (8)	Jrue Holiday (7)	Wells Fargo Center; 11,879	4-4
9	November 16	Utah	W 99–93	Jrue Holiday (26)	Allen, Richardson & T. Young (8)	Jrue Holiday (7)	Wells Fargo Center; 15,851	5–4
10	November 18	Cleveland	W 86–79	Evan Turner (19)	Hawes & Richardson (9)	Holiday & Turner (9)	Wells Fargo Center; 15,021	6–4
11	November 20	Toronto	W 106–98	Nick Young (23)	Jrue Holiday (8)	Jrue Holiday (12)	Wells Fargo Center; 13,965	7–4
12	November 21	@ Cleveland	L 83–92	Holiday & Richardson (16)	Thaddeus Young (11)	Evan Turner (7)	Quicken Loans Arena; 16,743	7–5
13	November 24	Oklahoma City	L 109–116	Thaddeus Young (29)	Thaddeus Young (15)	Jrue Holiday (13)	Wells Fargo Center; 19,611	7–6
14	November 25	Phoenix	W 104–101	Jrue Holiday (33)	Evan Turner (9)	Jrue Holiday (13)	Wells Fargo Center; 14,518	8–6
15	November 27	Dallas	W 100–98	Evan Turner (22)	Brown & Richardson (8)	Jrue Holiday (7)	Wells Fargo Center; 15,107	9–6
16	November 30	@ Charlotte	W 104–98	Evan Turner (25)	Allen & Turner (10)	Jrue Holiday (15)	Time Warner Cable Arena; 13202	10–6

December : 4–11 (home: 3–3; road: 1–8)

Game	Date	Team	Score	High points	High rebounds	High assists	Location Attendance	Record
17	December 1	@ Chicago	L 88–93	Jrue Holiday (23)	Lavoy Allen (8)	Holiday & Turner (7)	United Center; 21,607	10–7
18	December 4	Minnesota	L 88–105	Evan Turner (19)	Jason Richardson (7)	Jrue Holiday (9)	Wells Fargo Center; 13,986	10–8
19	December 7	Boston	W 95–94 (OT)	Evan Turner (26)	Thaddeus Young (12)	Evan Turner (5)	Wells Fargo Center; 17,921	11–8
20	December 8	@ Boston	L 79–92	Thaddeus Young (22)	Lavoy Allen (9)	Jrue Holiday (8)	TD Garden; 18,624	11–9
21	December 10	Detroit	W 104–97	Jrue Holiday (25)	Evan Turner (11)	Jrue Holiday (8)	Wells Fargo Center; 15,225	12–9
22	December 12	Chicago	L 89–96	Jrue Holiday (26)	Spencer Hawes (10)	Jrue Holiday (9)	Wells Fargo Center; 15,738	12–10
23	December 14	@ Indiana	L 85–95	Evan Turner (22)	Evan Turner (10)	Turner & N. Young (5)	Bankers Life Fieldhouse; 13,538	12–11
24	December 16	L. A. Lakers	L 98–111	Nick Young (30)	Kwame Brown (8)	Dorell Wright (9)	Wells Fargo Center; 20,338	12-12
25	December 18	@ Dallas	L 100–107	Dorell Wright (25)	Brown, Hawes & T. Young (7)	Maalik Wayns (9)	American Airlines Center; 20,162	12–13
26	December 19	@ Houston	L 103–125	Nick Young (21)	Lavoy Allen (7)	Dorell Wright (6)	Toyota Center; 15,266	12–14
27	December 21	Atlanta	W 99–80	Evan Turner (21)	Thaddeus Young (11)	Holiday & Richardson (7)	Wells Fargo Center; 18,061	13–14
28	December 23	@ Brooklyn	L 92–95	Jrue Holiday (24)	Thaddeus Young (10)	Jrue Holiday (9)	Barclays Center; 17,732	13–15
29	December 26	@ Memphis	W 99–89	Dorell Wright (28)	Spencer Hawes (9)	Holiday & Turner (9)	FedExForum; 16,055	14–15
30	December 28	@ Golden State	L 89–96	Jrue Holiday (21)	Thaddeus Young (10)	Jrue Holiday (10)	Oracle Arena; 19,596	14–16
31	December 29	@ Portland	L 85–89	Jrue Holiday (29)	Spencer Hawes (11)	Jrue Holiday (9)	Rose Garden; 20,569	14–17

January : 5–9 (home: 4–4; road: 1–5)

Game	Date	Team	Score	High points	High rebounds	High assists	Location Attendance	Record
32	January 1	@ L. A. Lakers	W 103–99	Jrue Holiday (26)	Evan Turner (13)	Jrue Holiday (10)	Staples Center; 18,997	15–17
33	January 2	@ Phoenix	L 89–95	Jrue Holiday (16)	Holiday & T. Young (10)	Jrue Holiday (10)	US Airways Center; 16,034	15–18
34	January 4	@ Oklahoma City	L 85–109	Nick Young (21)	Spencer Hawes (13)	Jrue Holiday (9)	Chesapeake Energy Arena; 18,203	15–19
35	January 5	@ San Antonio	L 86–109	Spencer Hawes (22)	Jrue Holiday (8)	Jrue Holiday (8)	AT&T Center; 18,581	15–20
36	January 8	Brooklyn	L 89–109	Jrue Holiday (19)	Evan Turner (7)	Jrue Holiday (8)	Wells Fargo Center; 16,167	15–21
37	January 9	@ Toronto	L 72–90	Holiday & T. Young (16)	Spencer Hawes (9)	Evan Turner (5)	Air Canada Centre; 15,629	15–22
38	January 12	Houston	W 107–100	Jrue Holiday (30)	Thaddeus Young (12)	Jrue Holiday (9)	Wells Fargo Center; 17,329	16–22
39	January 15	New Orleans	L 99–111	Jrue Holiday (29)	Evan Turner (7)	Jrue Holiday (11)	Wells Fargo Center; 17,304	16–23
40	January 18	Toronto	W 108–101	Jrue Holiday (33)	Thaddeus Young (14)	Jrue Holiday (14)	Wells Fargo Center; 16,574	17–23
41	January 21	San Antonio	L 85–90	Evan Turner (18)	Evan Turner (12)	Jrue Holiday (8)	Wells Fargo Center; 15,346	17–24
42	January 22	@ Milwaukee	L 102–110	Evan Turner (23)	Spencer Hawes (12)	Jrue Holiday (12)	Bradley Center; 13,080	17–25
43	January 26	New York	W 97–80	Jrue Holiday (35)	Evan Turner (6)	Jrue Holiday (6)	Wells Fargo Center; 20,540	18–25
44	January 28	Memphis	L 100–103	Evan Turner (27)	Thaddeus Young (7)	Jrue Holiday (10)	Wells Fargo Center; 15,448	18–26
45	January 30	Washington	W 92–84	Jrue Holiday (21)	Spencer Hawes (11)	Jrue Holiday (6)	Wells Fargo Center; 15,101	19–26

February : 3–8 (home: 3–4; road: 0–4)

Game	Date	Team	Score	High points	High rebounds	High assists	Location Attendance	Record
46	February 1	Sacramento	W 89–80	Thaddeus Young (23)	Thaddeus Young (15)	Jrue Holiday (7)	Wells Fargo Center; 17,927	20–26
47	February 4	Orlando	W 78–61	Spencer Hawes (21)	Spencer Hawes (14)	Jrue Holiday (14)	Wells Fargo Center; 14,630	21–26
48	February 6	Indiana	L 69–88	Jrue Holiday (19)	Spencer Hawes (10)	Holiday & Turner (4)	Wells Fargo Center; 15,299	21–27
49	February 9	Charlotte	W 87–76	Jrue Holiday (20)	Lavoy Allen (22)	Jrue Holiday (7)	Wells Fargo Center; 15,048	22–27
50	February 11	L. A. Clippers	L 90–107	Nick Young (29)	Spencer Hawes (10)	Jrue Holiday (9)	Wells Fargo Center; 17,550	22–28
51	February 13	@ Milwaukee	L 92–94	Evan Turner (20)	Spencer Hawes (9)	Jrue Holiday (12)	Bradley Center; 15,114	22–29
All-Star Break
52	February 20	@ Minnesota	L 87–94	Evan Turner (17)	Spencer Hawes (8)	Jrue Holiday (5)	Target Center; 14,439	22–30
53	February 23	Miami	L 90–114	Jrue Holiday (21)	Evan Turner (7)	Jrue Holiday (6)	Wells Fargo Center; 20,665	22–31
54	February 24	@ New York	L 93–99	Jrue Holiday (30)	Nick Young (10)	Evan Turner (8)	Madison Square Garden; 19,033	22–32
55	February 26	Orlando	L 84–98	Pargo & Wilkins (14)	Thaddeus Young (10)	Jrue Holiday (10)	Wells Fargo Center; 18,432	22–33
56	February 28	@ Chicago	L 82–93	Jrue Holiday (22)	Spencer Hawes (15)	Evan Turner (4)	United Center; 21,576	22–34

March : 8–9 (home: 6–2; road: 2–7)

Game	Date	Team	Score	High points	High rebounds	High assists	Location Attendance	Record
57	March 2	Golden State	W 104–97	Jrue Holiday (27)	Thaddeus Young (16)	Evan Turner (9)	Wells Fargo Center; 17,929	23–34
58	March 3	@ Washington	L 87–90	Dorell Wright (15)	Spencer Hawes (11)	Jrue Holiday (6)	Verizon Center; 17,370	23–35
59	March 5	Boston	L 101–109	Thaddeus Young (19)	Thaddeus Young (10)	Jrue Holiday (10)	Wells Fargo Center; 16,189	23–36
60	March 6	@ Atlanta	L 96–107	Damien Wilkins (21)	Spencer Hawes (11)	Jrue Holiday (12)	Philips Arena; 13,018	23–37
61	March 8	@ Miami	L 93–102	Thaddeus Young (25)	Spencer Hawes (10)	Jrue Holiday (13)	American Airlines Arena; 20,029	23–38
62	March 10	@ Orlando	L 91–99	Thaddeus Young (26)	Thaddeus Young (12)	Jrue Holiday (8)	Amway Center; 16,317	23–39
63	March 11	Brooklyn	W 106–97	Spencer Hawes (24)	Thaddeus Young (10)	Jrue Holiday (11)	Wells Fargo Center; 16,789	24–39
64	March 13	Miami	L 94–98	Thaddeus Young (24)	Thaddeus Young (15)	Jrue Holiday (7)	Wells Fargo Center; 20,398	24–40
65	March 16	Indiana	W 98–91	Jrue Holiday (27)	Spencer Hawes (16)	Jrue Holiday (12)	Wells Fargo Center; 18,587	25–40
66	March 18	Portland	W 101–100	Jrue Holiday (27)	Spencer Hawes (13)	Damien Wilkins (6)	Wells Fargo Center; 15,623	26–40
67	March 20	@ L. A. Clippers	L 72–101	Spencer Hawes (16)	Thaddeus Young (8)	Spencer Hawes (7)	Staples Center; 19,187	26–41
68	March 21	@ Denver	L 100–101	Damien Wilkins (24)	Spencer Hawes (12)	Jrue Holiday (15)	Pepsi Center; 19,155	26–42
69	March 24	@ Sacramento	W 117–103	Dorell Wright (22)	Spencer Hawes, Jrue Holiday (10)	Evan Turner (8)	Power Balance Pavilion; 14,647	27–42
70	March 25	@ Utah	L 91–107	Dorell Wright (19)	Spencer Hawes, Lavoy Allen, Arnett Moultrie (8)	Dorell Wright (4)	EnergySolutions Arena; 17,336	27–43
71	March 27	Milwaukee	W 100–92	Damien Wilkins, Jrue Holiday (18)	Spencer Hawes (17)	Jrue Holiday (6)	Wells Fargo Center; 16,640	28–43
72	March 29	@ Cleveland	W 97–87	Evan Turner (23)	Evan Turner (13)	Damien Wilkins & Jrue Holiday (6)	Quicken Loans Arena; 17,324	29–43
73	March 30	Charlotte	W 100–92	Evan Turner (22)	Thaddeus Young (10)	Jrue Holiday (9)	Wells Fargo Center; 16,764	30–43

April : 4–5 (home: 1–1; road: 3–4)

Game	Date	Team	Score	High points	High rebounds	High assists	Location Attendance	Record
74	April 3	@ Charlotte	L 83–88	Damien Wilkins (20)	Damien Wilkins (9)	Jrue Holiday (8)	Time Warner Cable Arena; 13,097	30–44
75	April 5	@ Atlanta	W 101–90	Evan Turner (24)	Thaddeus Young (13)	Jrue Holiday (8)	Philips Arena; 17,020	31–44
76	April 6	@ Miami	L 87–106	Jrue Holiday (18)	Spencer Hawes (11)	Jrue Holiday (6)	American Airlines Arena; 20,168	31–45
77	April 9	@ Brooklyn	L 83–104	Thaddeus Young (18)	Spencer Hawes (6)	Evan Turner (5)	Barclays Center; 17,192	31–46
78	April 10	Atlanta	L 101–124	Thaddeus Young (28)	Thaddeus Young (8)	Evan Turner (7)	Wells Fargo Center; 17,178	31–47
79	April 12	@ Washington	W 97–86	Jrue Holiday (22)	Thaddeus Young (13)	Evan Turner (7)	Verizon Center; 18,476	32–47
80	April 14	Cleveland	W 91–77	Dorell Wright (15)	Thaddeus Young (9)	Spencer Hawes (6)	Wells Fargo Center; 18,764	33–47
81	April 15	@ Detroit	L 101–109	Dorell Wright (22)	Spencer Hawes (9)	Dorell Wright (6)	The Palace of Auburn Hills; 17,525	33–48
82	April 17	@ Indiana	W 105–95	Dorell Wright (23)	Arnett Moultrie (12)	Evan Turner (5)	Bankers Life Fieldhouse; 18,165	34–48

2012–13 season schedule

== Player statistics ==
Legend
GP	Games played	GS	Games started	MPG	Minutes per game
FG%	Field-goal percentage	3P%	3-point field-goal percentage	FT%	Free-throw percentage
RPG	Rebounds per game	APG	Assists per game	SPG	Steals per game
BPG	Blocks per game	PPG	Points per game

=== Regular season ===
Player	GP	GS	MPG	FG%	3P%	FT%	RPG	APG	SPG	BPG	PPG
Evan Turner	82	82	35.3	.419	.365	.740	6.3	4.3	.9	.2	13.3
Spencer Hawes	82	40	27.2	.464	.356	.777	7.2	2.2	.3	1.4	11.0
Lavoy Allen	79	37	21.1	.454	.000	.717	5.0	.9	.3	.7	5.8
Dorell Wright	79	8	22.6	.396	.374	.851	3.8	1.9	.8	.4	9.2
Jrue Holiday	78	78	37.5	.431	.368	.752	4.2	8.0	1.6	.4	17.7
Thaddeus Young	76	76	34.6	.531	.125	.574	7.5	1.6	1.8	.7	14.8
Damien Wilkins	61	21	18.0	.459	.333	.743	1.7	1.5	.6	.3	6.4
Nick Young	59	17	23.9	.413	.357	.820	2.2	1.4	.6	.2	10.6
Royal Ivey	53	5	13.2	.431	.420	.563	1.1	.6	.4	.1	3.2
Arnett Moultrie	47	0	11.5	.582		.643	3.1	.2	.4	.2	3.7
Jason Richardson	33	33	28.4	.402	.341	.606	3.8	1.5	1.2	.5	10.5
Kwame Brown	22	11	12.2	.459		.368	3.4	.4	.3	.5	1.9
Maalik Wayns^{†}	21	1	7.9	.264	.200	.867	.2	1.0	.1	.0	2.7
Jeremy Pargo^{†}	14	0	14.9	.381	.412	.667	1.2	2.0	.1	.0	4.9
Charles Jenkins^{†}	12	1	12.5	.368		.500	.9	1.3	.5	.1	2.5
Justin Holiday	9	0	15.8	.333	.250	.750	1.6	1.7	.3	.7	4.7
Shelvin Mack^{†}	4	0	1.8	.500	.000		.0	.3	.0	.0	.5

- ^{†} Denotes player spent time with another team in the season. Stats reflect time with the 76ers only.

== Notable Transactions ==
=== Additions ===
Player	Acquired Via	Former Team
Nick Young	Free Agency	Los Angeles Clippers
Dorell Wright	Trade	Golden State Warriors
Kwame Brown	Free Agency	Golden State Warriors
Royal Ivey	Free Agency	Oklahoma City Thunder
Andrew Bynum	Trade	Los Angeles Lakers
Jason Richardson	Trade	Orlando Magic

=== Subtractions ===
Player	Departed Via	New Team
Elton Brand	Amnesty Clause	Dallas Mavericks
Lou Williams	Free Agency	Atlanta Hawks
Andre Iguodala	Trade	Denver Nuggets
Nikola Vucevic	Trade	Orlando Magic
