= Evan Turner =

American basketball player and coach (born 1988)

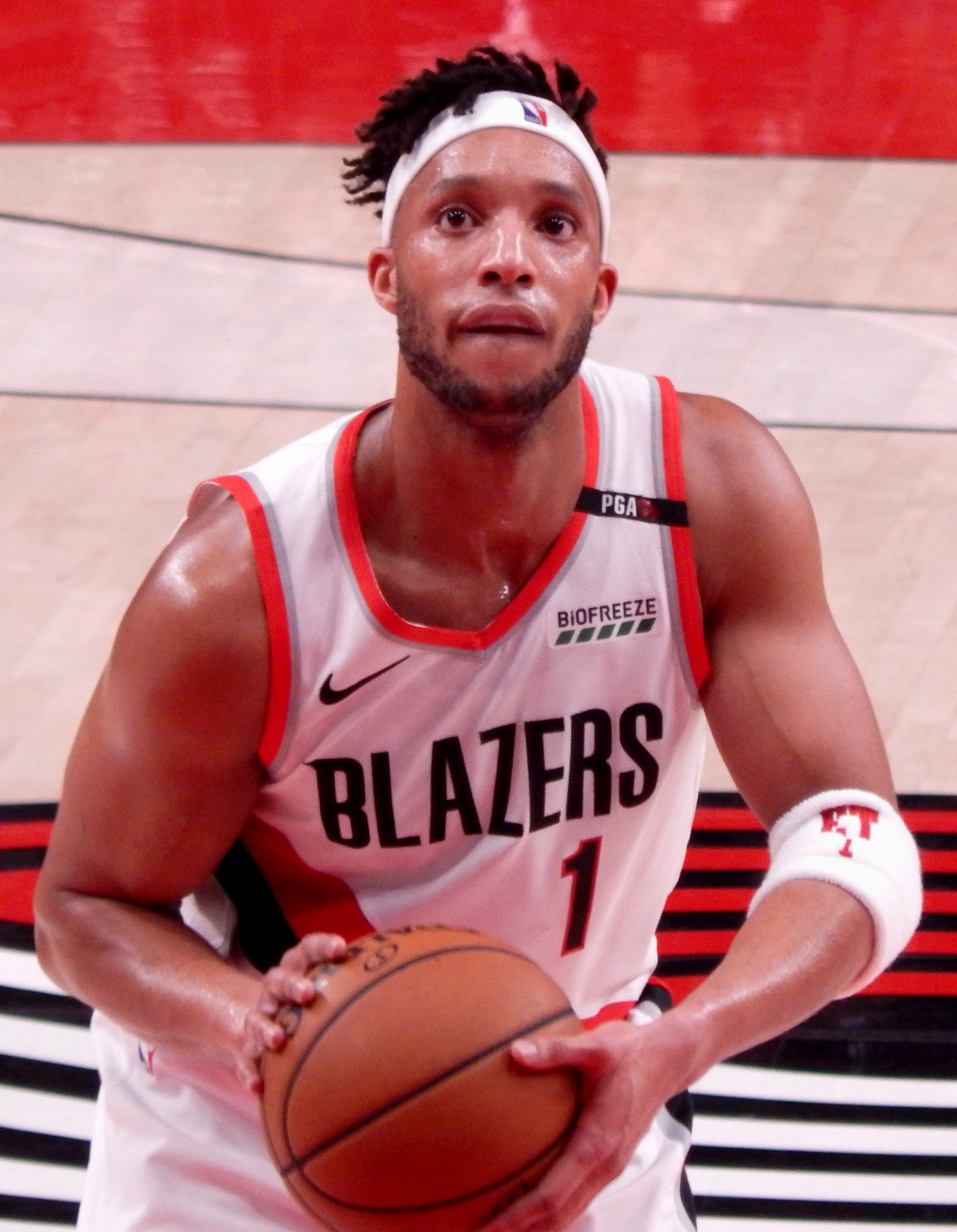
- Turner with the Portland Trail Blazers in 2019

Personal information
- Born: October 27, 1988 (age 38) Chicago, Illinois, U.S.
- Listed height: 6 ft 6 in (1.98 m)
- Listed weight: 220 lb (100 kg)

Career information
- High school: St. Joseph (Westchester, Illinois)
- College: Ohio State (2007–2010)
- NBA draft: 2010: 1st round, 2nd overall pick
- Drafted by: Philadelphia 76ers
- Playing career: 2010–2020
- Position: Small forward / guard
- Number: 12, 11, 1
- Coaching career: 2020–present

Career history

Playing
- 2010–2014: Philadelphia 76ers
- 2014: Indiana Pacers
- 2014–2016: Boston Celtics
- 2016–2019: Portland Trail Blazers
- 2019–2020: Atlanta Hawks

Coaching
- 2020–2021: Boston Celtics (assistant)

Career highlights
- National college player of the year (2010); Consensus first-team All-American (2010); Big Ten Male Athlete of the Year (2010); Big Ten Player of the Year (2010); 2× First-team All-Big Ten (2009, 2010); Big Ten tournament MOP (2010); No. 21 retired by Ohio State Buckeyes

Career NBA statistics
- Points: 6,824 (9.7 ppg)
- Rebounds: 3,278 (4.6 rpg)
- Assists: 2,462 (3.5 apg)
- Stats at NBA.com
- Stats at Basketball Reference
Medals
Men's basketball
Representing United States
Summer Universiade
Bronze medal – third place	2009 Belgrade	Team competition

Evan Marcel Turner (born October 27, 1988) is an American professional basketball coach and former player. He was most recently an assistant coach for the Boston Celtics of the National Basketball Association (NBA). He was drafted second overall by the Philadelphia 76ers in the 2010 NBA draft.

Turner attended St. Joseph High School in Westchester, Illinois. By his senior season, he was one of the top high school basketball players at his position in the nation.

In 2010, Turner was a first-team All-American and the John R. Wooden Award National Player of the Year while playing at Ohio State University; he also became a two-time scoring champion and the Player of the Year for the Big Ten Conference. He was twice the only unanimous selection for the All-Big Ten first team by both the coaches and the media (i.e., 2008–09 and 2009–10). By finishing first in scoring and second in both rebounds and assists in the conference in the 2009–10 season, he was the first men's basketball player to finish in the top two in each of these categories and the first to finish in the top five in each category in the same season. He holds the conference record for most Conference Player of the Week awards, both in a career and in a single season.

In March 2022, Evan Turner started a podcast with his former teammate from the 76ers, Andre Iguodala. The podcast is called Point Forward.

== Early life ==
Turner was born weighing 10 pounds (4.5 kg). Within his first year, he endured chicken pox, pneumonia, asthma, and measles. The 1989 Chicago measles epidemic caused Turner to desperately need emergency room services. He encountered severe breathing problems that required the removal of his adenoids and tonsils. At the age of three, he was hit by a car, resulting in a concussion and stitches. Oversized baby teeth and an overbite caused a speech impediment that necessitated speech therapy.

== High school career ==
Before high school, Turner and fellow NBA player Iman Shumpert were teammates on the 8th grade basketball team at Gwendolyn Brooks Middle School in Oak Park, Illinois. He played in the Summer 2004 AAU Boys 15-under Basketball National Championship Tournament for the Illinois Knights. As a high school sophomore, he helped lead St. Joseph to a run in the Illinois AA Boys High School basketball tournament, which helped him get the attention of NCAA Division I basketball coaches. At St. Joseph's, which had previously produced Isiah Thomas, he was part of a Chicago area sophomore class that included Derrick Rose and his St. Joseph's teammate Demetri McCamey.

Turner started getting major Division I offers early in his junior year, At the beginning of his junior season, Chicago Tribune named him to its annual top Chicago metropolitan area basketball players list. His team went to the state sectional final before losing to Proviso East High School in the sectional final. After his junior season, he was considered one of the top 25 prospects in the country in his class and he was given special mention by the Chicago Tribune and honorable mention by the Associated Press for all-state honors. During the summer of 2006, he committed to Ohio State. Turner's decision was influenced by his relationship with his father, James Turner, who lived in Columbus and whom Turner had visited every summer since he was ten years old.

During his senior season, his team was listed second to Rose's Simeon Career Academy in the preseason Tribune Chicago area high school basketball team rankings. That season, he was named to the first-team Associated Press 2006–07 Class AA all-state team, a day before Rose's Simeon eliminated Turner's St. Joseph in the Illinois Class AA supersectional. Turner and McCamey finished third and sixth to Rose in the Illinois Mr. Basketball voting, and the Chicago Tribune chose both of them as first team All-state selections. Turner was ranked as the #7, #13 and #16 small forward in the nation as a high school senior by ESPN, rivals.com, and scout.com respectively. He received scholarship offers from five Big Ten Conference basketball programs, as well as Wake Forest, DePaul and Notre Dame.

College recruiting
Name	Hometown	School	Height	Weight	Commit date
Evan Turner; SF	Chicago, Illinois	St. Joseph (IL)	6 ft 7 in (2.01 m)	205 lb (93 kg)	Jun 29, 2006
Evan Turner; SF	Recruit ratings: Scout: Rivals: (96)				
Overall recruit ranking: Scout: 16 (SF) Rivals: 49, 13 (SF) ESPN: 49, 7 (SF)
Note: In many cases, Scout, Rivals, 247Sports, On3, and ESPN may conflict in their listings of height and weight.; In these cases, the average was taken. ESPN grades are on a 100-point scale.; Sources: "Ohio State Basketball Commitments". Rivals.; "2007 Ohio State Basketball Commits". Scout.; "ESPN". ESPN.; "Scout.com Team Recruiting Rankings". Scout.; "2007 Team Ranking". Rivals.

== College career ==
=== Freshman year ===
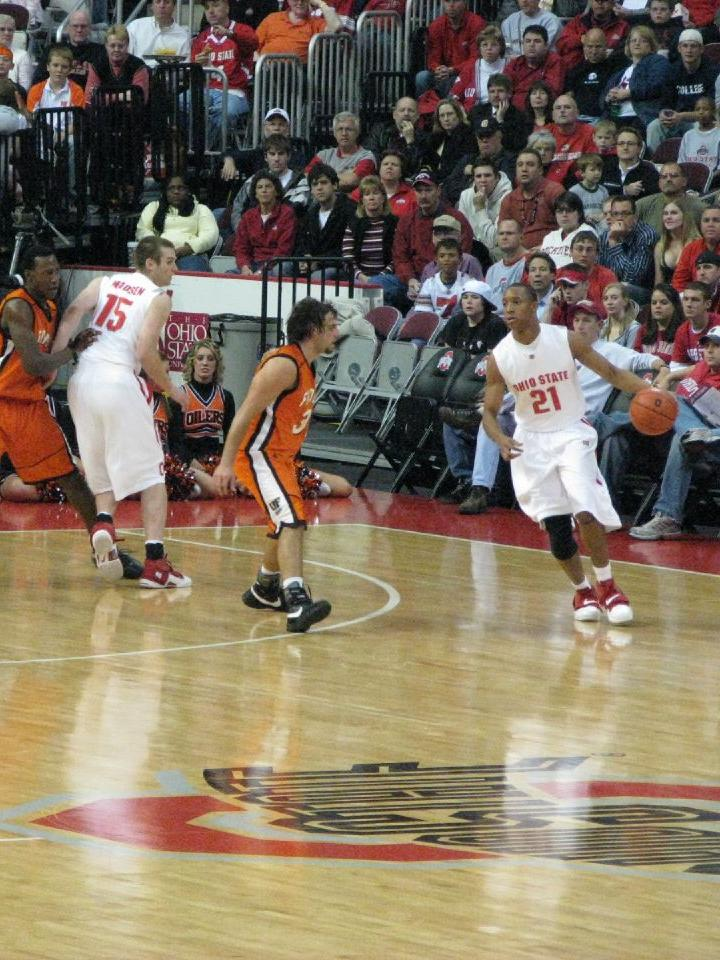
Turner as a freshman during a November 6, 2007, Ohio State exhibition game.

As a freshman, Turner averaged 27.1 minutes per game, 8.5 points per game and 4.4 rebounds per game over the course of the season and finished second on the team in assists and third in steals. Turner recorded his first career double double on January 19, 2008, at Thompson–Boling Arena against the Tennessee Vols with his first 20-point game and first 10-rebound game. That season, he helped Ohio State win the 2008 National Invitation Tournament by averaging 18.5 points, 7 rebounds, 4.5 assists and 3 steals in the tournament's semifinal and final round at Madison Square Garden. Turner had also scored in double digits in the quarterfinal round. He was also in the starting lineup for the other two NIT games. Turner contributed at least 24 minutes as a starter in each of the five tournament games.

=== Sophomore year ===
As a sophomore, Turner was named player of the week three times during the 2008–09 Big Ten Conference men's basketball season (December 8, 2008, February 2, 2009, and February 9, 2009). On February 26, Turner became the only Big Ten player selected by the U.S. Basketball Writers Association (USBWA) as a Top 15 finalist for the Oscar Robertson Trophy. As a guard/forward for the Ohio State Buckeyes men's basketball team of the Big Ten Conference, he led his team in the following per-game statistical categories: points, rebounds, assists, and steals. Turner led the Big Ten in scoring as a sophomore. Turner and Manny Harris became the fourth and fifth players in conference history to finish in the top ten in the conference in points, rebounds and assists since assists became a statistic in 1983–84, following Steve Smith, Jim Jackson and Brian Evans.

Although Turner was not selected as a preseason All-Big Ten conference player, he was the only person chosen as a unanimous first-team All Big Ten selection by both the coaches and the media at the end of the regular season. On March 5, the National Association of Basketball Coaches honored Turner as a District 7 (Big Ten) first-team selection along with four other sophomores. He was also chosen on March 10 by the U.S. Basketball Writers Association for its 2008–09 Men's Division I District V (OH, IN, IL, MI, MN, WI) Team, based on voting from its national membership. Turner was selected as a 2009 All-American honorable mention by the Associated Press. On March 15, he was selected to the 2009 Big Ten Conference men's basketball tournament team, despite Ohio State's loss in the final game to Purdue. Turner played for the 2009 Junior USA World University Championships team, along with conference foes Robbie Hummel of Purdue and Talor Battle of Penn State. He helped them to the bronze medal and a 6–1 record.

=== Junior year ===
His junior season began with numerous accolades. ESPN chose both Kalin Lucas and Turner to its 2009–10 NCAA Division I men's basketball season preseason second-team All-American list. FOX Sports preseason All-American list included him on its fifth team. Turner was named among the 50 preseason Wooden Award watch list nominees and the 50 preseason Naismith College Player of the Year watchlist nominees. The 24-member Big Ten media panel selected him as a first-team preseason All-Big Ten team member.

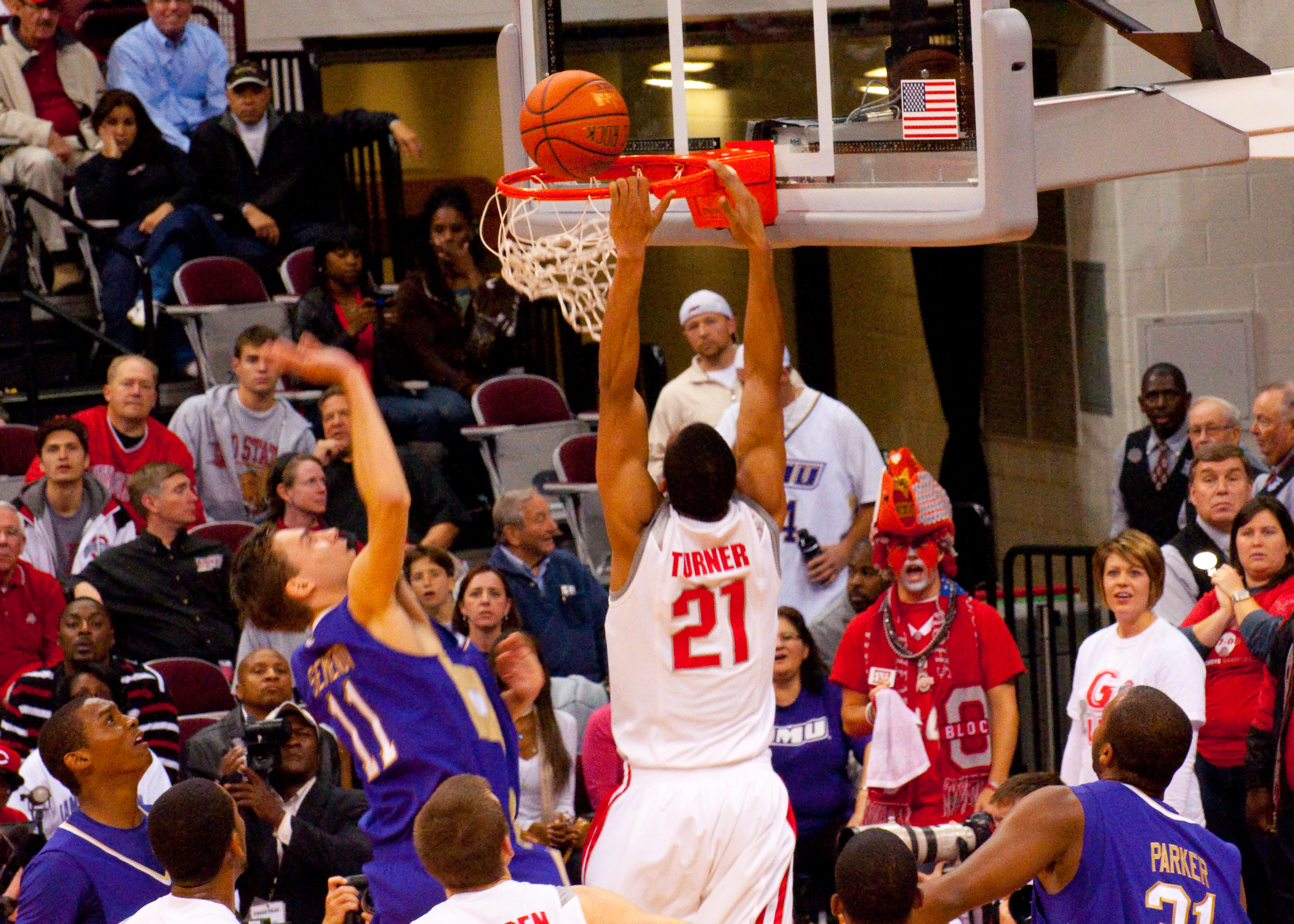
Turner dunks against James Madison in November 2009

Turner, nicknamed "The Villain", opened the season by recording the first triple double by a Big Ten player since January 13, 2001, and the second in school history (Dennis Hopson was the first) during the Coaches vs. Cancer classic against Alcorn State University. This earned him his fourth career Big Ten player of the week honor and first of the 2009–10 Big Ten Conference men's basketball season. The following week, he ran his streak of double doubles to four to earn back-to-back player of the week honors. Two weeks after his first triple-double, he repeated the feat at home against Lipscomb University on November 24. This earned him his third consecutive Big Ten player of the week award. On December 5, 2009, in the fourth week of the season, he suffered transverse process fractures of the second and third lumbar vertebrae in his back, which was expected to cause him to be inactive for two months. Turner returned early from his injury on January 6, 2010. This occurred two days after Ohio State fell out of the top 25 in the 2009–10 NCAA Division I men's basketball rankings on January 4 in his absence. With Turner back in the lineup, Ohio State returned to the top 25 on January 18, and Turner earned his fourth Big Ten Player of the Week award on the same day after leading his team to wins over two ranked conference foes. Then on February 8, Turner established a new Big Ten Conference record with his eighth career Conference Player of the Week award, surpassing Glenn Robinson and Jackson. The fifth of the season also tied Robinson's single-season record. Two weeks after tying the single-season record, he broke the record when he averaged 24.5 points, 8.5 rebounds and 5.5 assists against two ranked conference opponents (No. 4 Purdue and at No. 11 Michigan State). Then he won the award again on March 1.

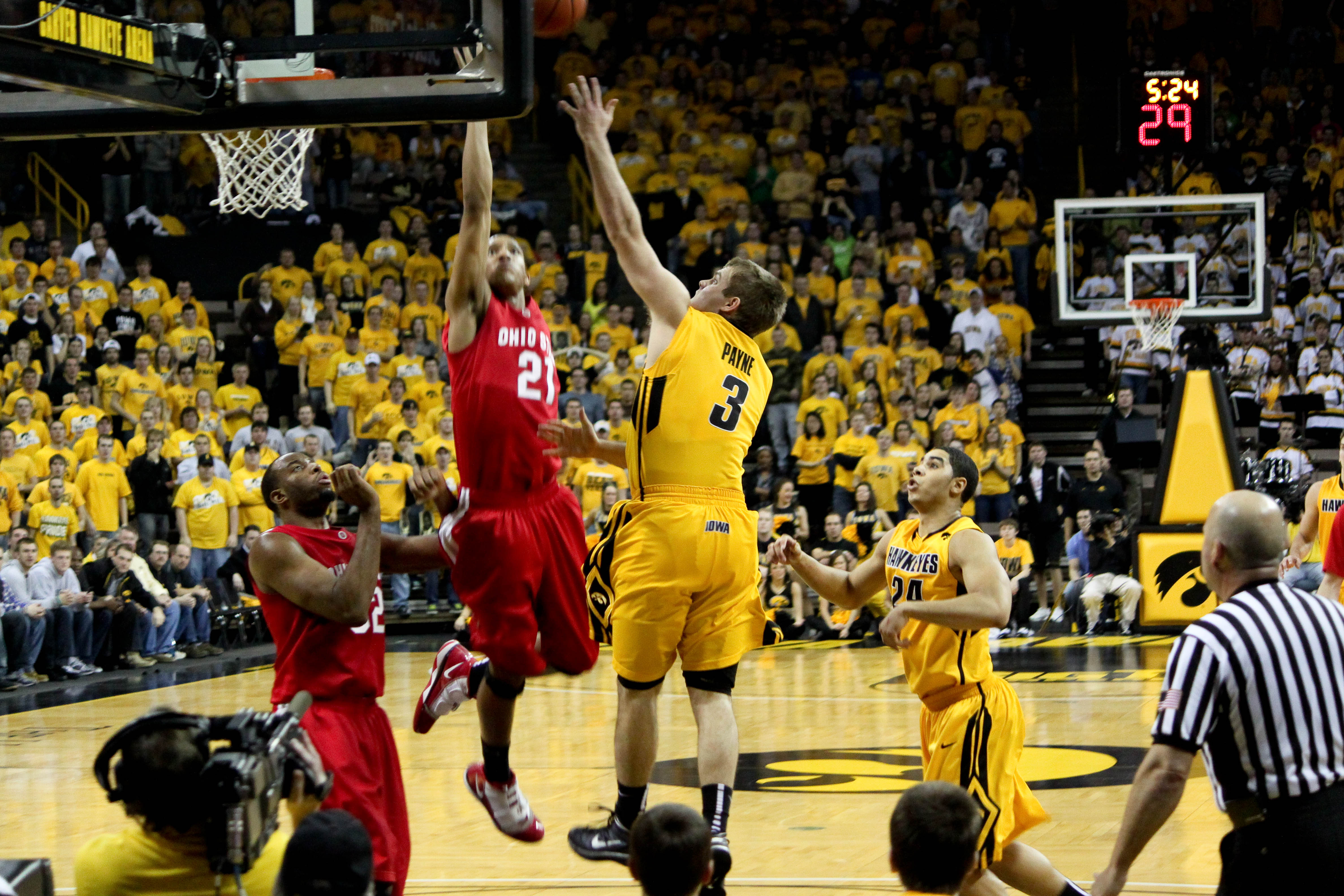
Turner against Iowa in January 2010

Turner helped lead the Buckeyes to the regular-season co-championship of the Big Ten Conference and helped them earn the number one seed in the 2010 Big Ten Conference men's basketball tournament. On March 12, 2010, in their first game in the tournament, Turner helped the Buckeyes get a win over their arch-rival Michigan Wolverines with a last-second 37-foot three-pointer. In the second game, against Illinois, Turner scored 31 points, scoring the game-tying points to send the game to overtime and then the final four points in overtime to send the game into double overtime. Turner scored a total of 12 points in overtime. He then led Ohio State to victory in the championship game against Minnesota with another 31 points. Turner was named Tournament Most Outstanding Player and part of the All-Tournament team. Turner also repeated as the Big Ten scoring champion, and although he lost the rebounding championship to Mike Davis (9.167 to 9.161), he led the conference in defensive rebounds. He also ranked second in assists and third in steals. He improved upon his sophomore showing by becoming the first player to finish in the top two in average points (1st, 20.4), rebounds (2nd, 9.2) and assists (2nd, 6.0), becoming the first men's basketball player to do so and the first to finish in the top five in all three categories.

==== Awards ====
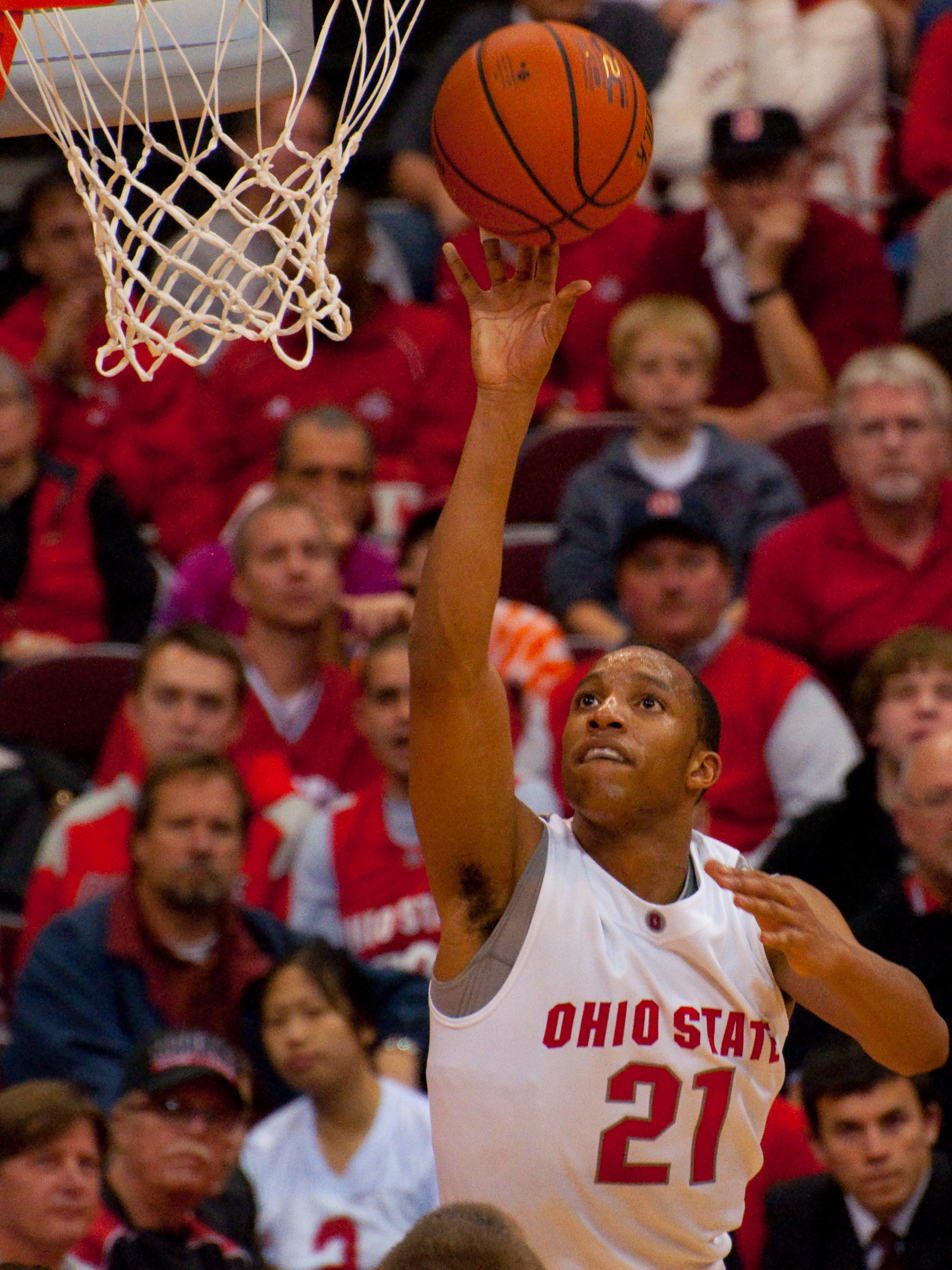
Turner in November 2009

Turner was selected as a Midseason Top-30 finalist for the 2010 John Wooden Award in January. He was included on the March 15, 26-man final national ballot for the Wooden Award. From that ballot he was selected to the ten-man Wooden All-American team. Then the list was shortened to five finalists (Turner, Sherron Collins, John Wall, Wesley Johnson and Da'Sean Butler) who were flown out to Los Angeles for the announcement. On April 9, Turner was announced as the winner. In February, he was named a midseason Top 30 candidate for the Naismith College Player of the Year and was announced the recipient of the award in Indianapolis April 5, 2010. Turner won the USBWA's Robertson Trophy as the consensus choice by voters in all nine geographical districts. Fox, Associated Press and Sporting News selected him as their National Player of the Year. He earned 54 of the 65 Associated Press panel members' votes. He was recognized the National Association of Basketball Coaches' Division I Player of the Year.

By winning the Wooden, Naismith, Robertson, Fox Sports, NABC, TSN, and AP Player of the Year awards, he nearly swept all of the major player of the year awards. Wall won the Adolph Rupp Trophy (and Yahoo! Sports player of the year). Turner was again the only person chosen as a unanimous first-team All Big Ten selection by both the coaches and the media at the end of the regular season and was selected as the 2010 Big Ten Men's Basketball Player of the Year. Turner was also selected as the Big Ten Conference male Athlete of the Year for all sports.

Turner was selected as a first-team 2010 NCAA Men's Basketball All-American by Associated Press, Sporting News, Fox Sports, National Association of Basketball Coaches, United States Basketball Writers Association and Yahoo! Sports. He was also selected in March as one of six finalists for the Bob Cousy Award.

On February 16, 2016, at halftime of the Ohio State–Michigan game at Value City Arena, Turner's collegiate number, 21, was retired by Ohio State.

== Professional career ==
=== Philadelphia 76ers (2010–2014) ===
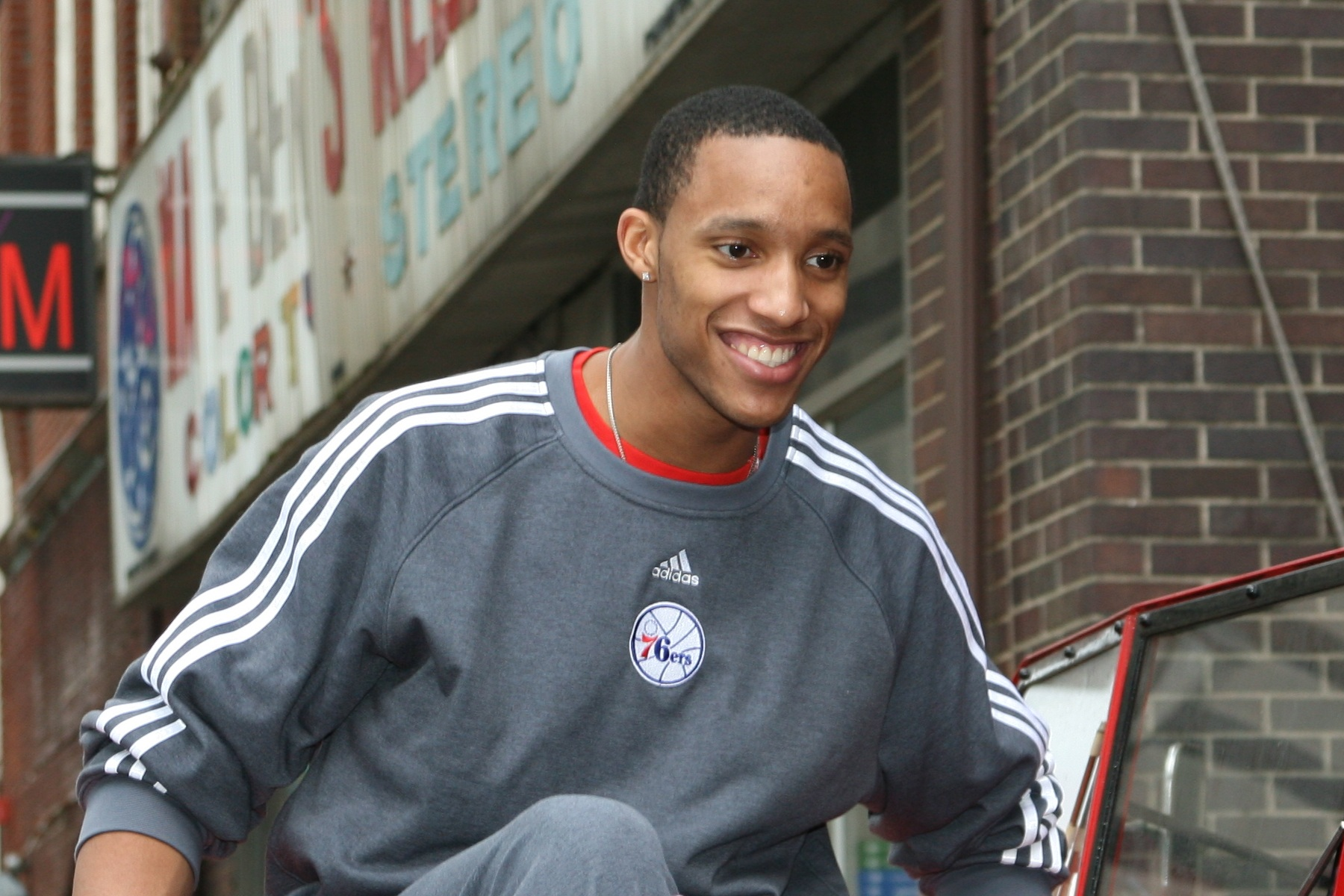
Turner as a rookie

On April 7, 2010, Turner held a press conference and announced that he would forgo his final season of collegiate eligibility and enter the 2010 NBA draft, where he was expected to be selected as one of the top 3 draft picks. Turner signed with Michael Jordan's agent, David Falk. He was selected with the 2nd overall pick by the Philadelphia 76ers in the draft, and signed a 2-year deal with a third-year option worth an estimated $12 million.

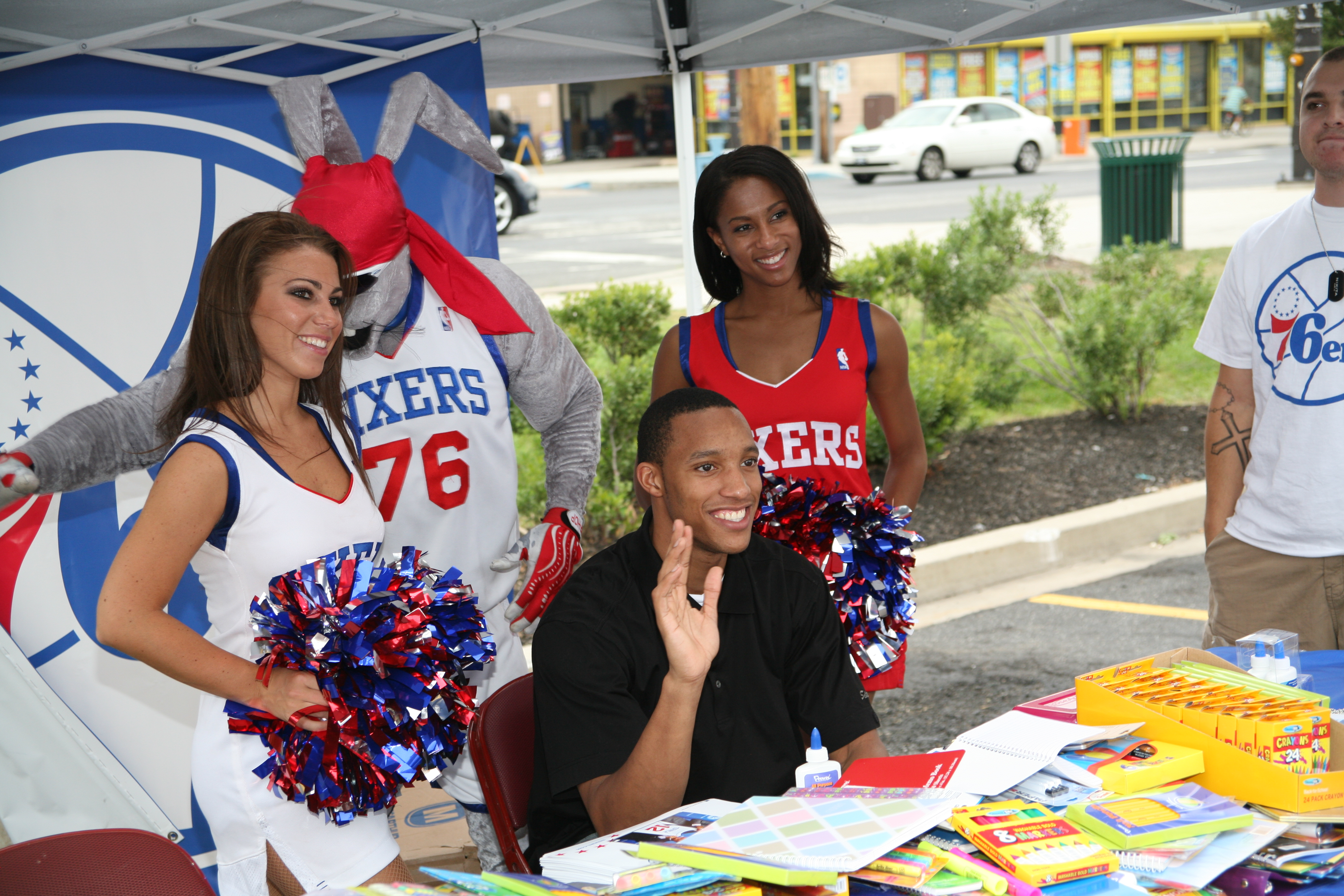
Turner with cheerleaders and the team mascot

On October 27, 2010, in his debut (and also on his 22nd birthday) for the 76ers in their season opener at Wells Fargo Center, Turner recorded 16 points, 7 rebounds, and 4 assists, coming off the bench for 30 minutes to lead the team in scoring in a 97–87 loss to the Miami Heat. On November 7, 2010, Turner got his first NBA start and ended the game with a double-double, recording 14 points and 10 rebounds to go with his 3 assists, in a 106–96 win over the New York Knicks in place of the injured Andre Iguodala. On December 29, 2010, Turner scored a career-high 23 points in a 123–110 win against the Phoenix Suns, going 9–12 from the field and a perfect 4–4 from the free throw line. He ended the season with fourteen starts and two double-doubles. The team had gone 27–55 the previous season, but were able to improve to 41–41 in Turner's first season. They reached the 2011 NBA Playoffs as the seventh seed, and were matched up against the new-look Miami Heat led by LeBron James and Dwyane Wade. Turner was praised for his aggressiveness in the series, handling Wade on the defensive side, and scoring 17 points and six rebounds on 50% shooting in the 76ers' win in Game 4. That would be Philadelphia's only win of the series however, as they fell to the eventual Eastern Conference Champions Miami in five games.

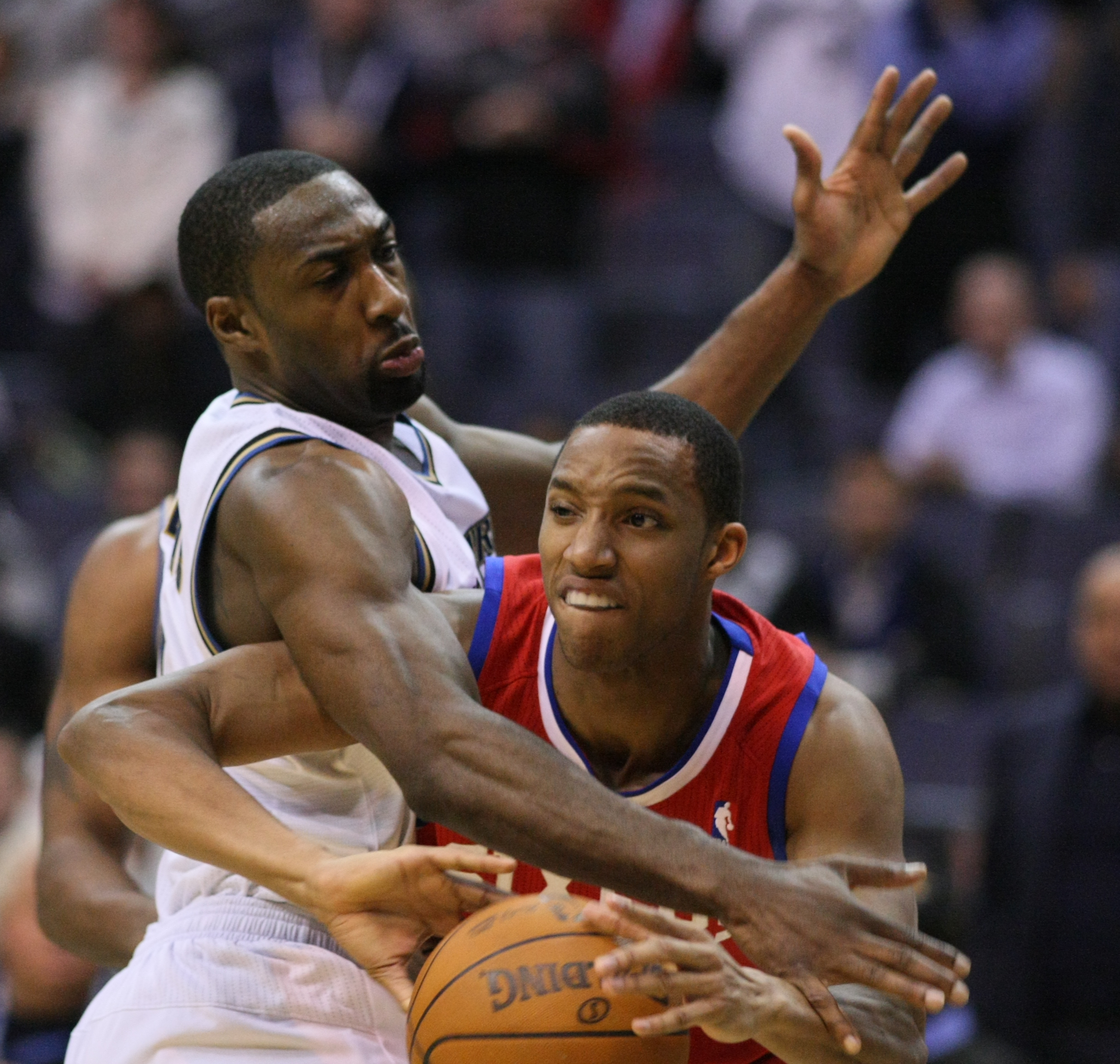
Turner with the 76ers against Gilbert Arenas

On February 8, 2012, Turner was selected to play in the 2012 Rising Stars competition. During the game, he unveiled a new model of Li-Ning shoes. On March 7, 2012, in only his second start of the season, Turner recorded a career-high 26 points against the Boston Celtics. He again scored 26 points on April 3, 2012, against the Miami Heat. On April 25, 2012, he recorded another double-double while setting a career-high with 29 points and adding 13 rebounds. Over the course of the season, he made twenty starts and recorded five double-doubles. He posted his first postseason double double on May 12, 2012, against the Boston Celtics in the first game of the Eastern Conference semifinals of the 2012 NBA Playoffs, with 16 points and 10 rebounds. He repeated the feat on May 21 in game five of the series, recording 10 rebounds and 11 points. He started 12 of Philadelphia's 13 playoff games, but the team was eliminated in the second round of the playoffs.

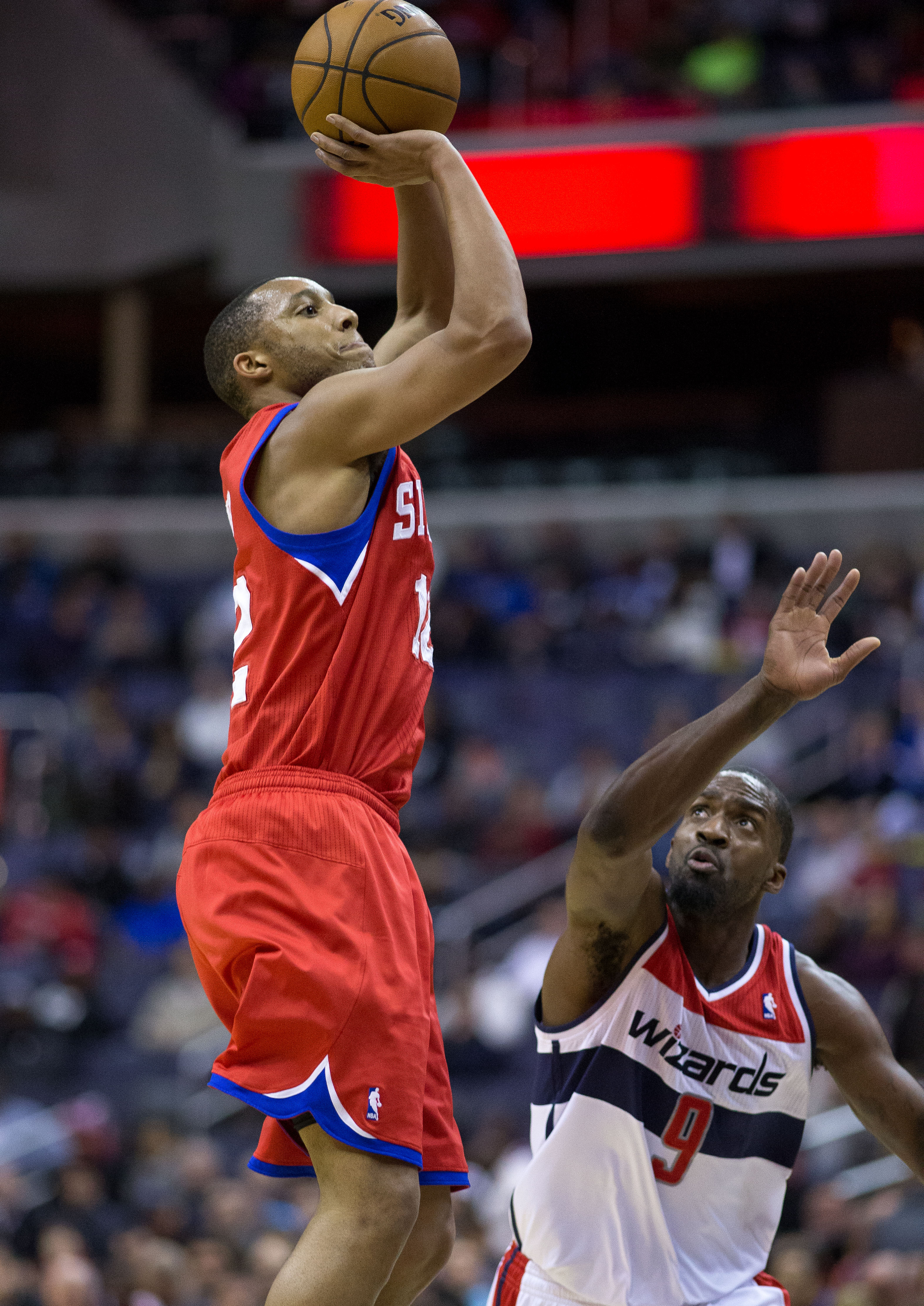
Turner taking a shot

Turner started all 82 games during the 2012–13 NBA season and tallied 14 double-doubles, while averaging a career high 15.3 points 6.3 rebounds and 4.3 assists. On December 7, 2012, he posted a 26-point, 10-rebound double-double against the Boston Celtics and made the game-winning shot in overtime with 3.9 seconds remaining.

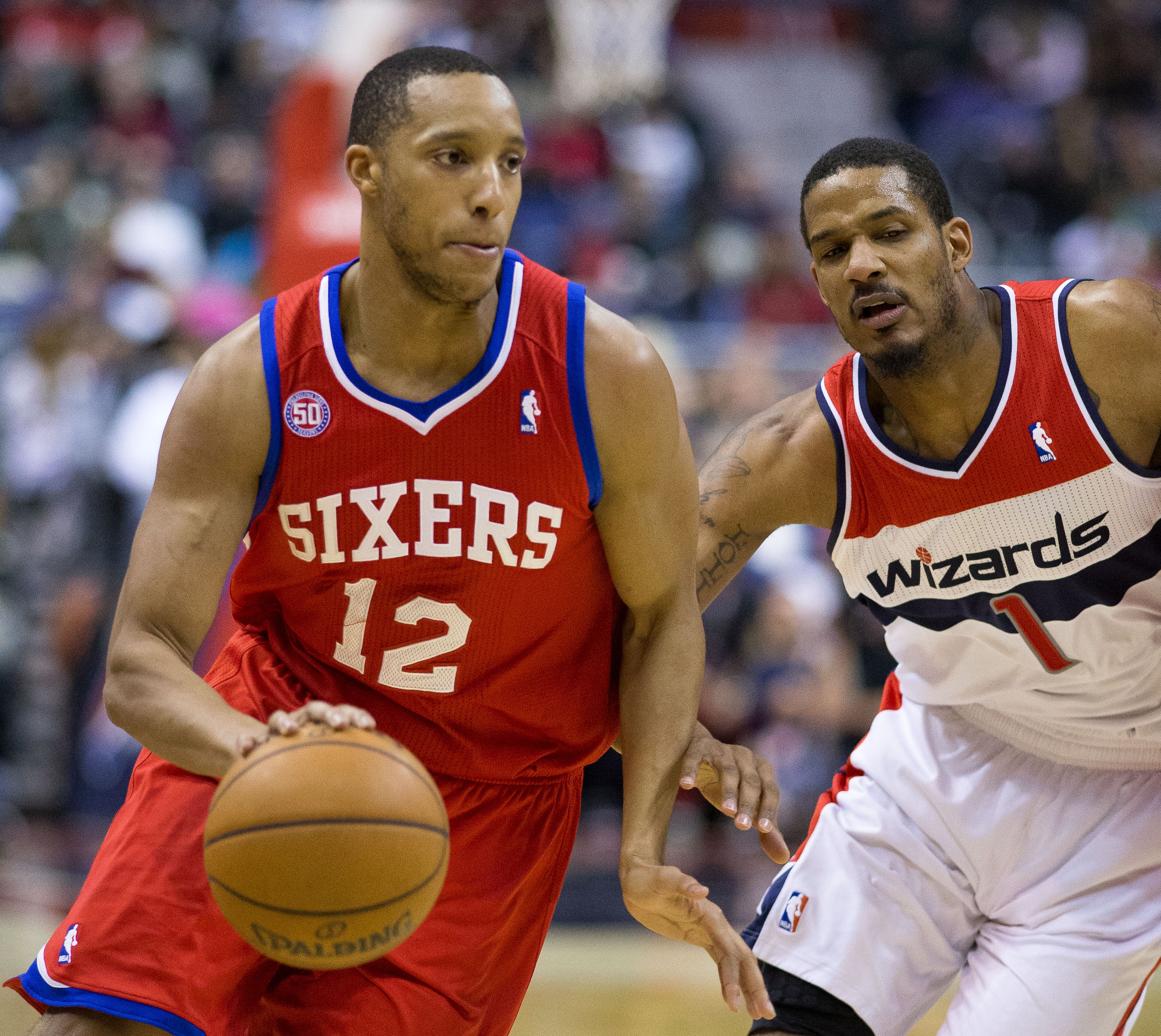
Turner (left) with the 76ers against Trevor Ariza in March 2013

The 76ers did not sign Turner to an extension prior to the October 31, 2013, deadline, meaning that the 76ers had the right to make him a restricted free agent at the end of the season. On November 9, 2013, Turner established a new career high with 31 points, including the game-tying basket with 8.7 seconds remaining in the first overtime against the Cleveland Cavaliers. Turner hit the game-winning buzzer beater on December 20 against the Brooklyn Nets. Turner sat out on December 28 due to knee soreness, but he returned to the lineup the following night against the Los Angeles Lakers with 32 points, 7 rebounds and 6 assists. On January 22, 2014, Turner recorded a career-high 34 points in a 110–106 win over the New York Knicks; he also recorded 11 rebounds in the game. Turner hit the game-winning buzzer beater on January 29, 2014, against the Boston Celtics.

=== Indiana Pacers (2014) ===
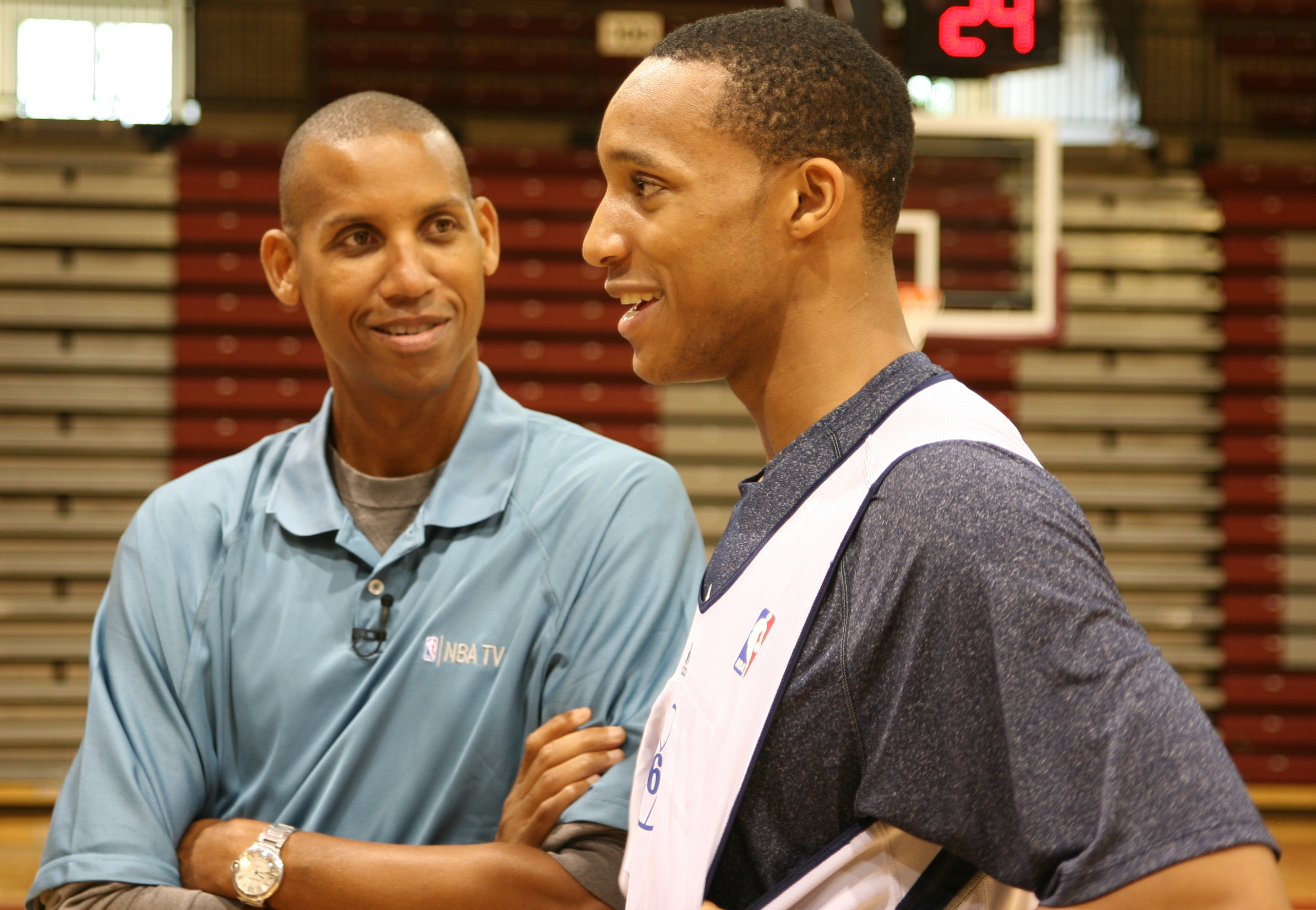
Turner (right) with former NBA player Reggie Miller

On February 20, 2014, Turner and Lavoy Allen were traded to the Indiana Pacers in exchange for Danny Granger and a second-round draft pick. Turner debuted for the Pacers on February 25, 2014. He scored 13 points and added 6 rebounds as part of the Pacers bench that scored a season-high 50 points against the Los Angeles Lakers. When the Pacers benched their entire starting lineup on April 6, he scored 23 to help the team to a win over the Milwaukee Bucks. On April 21, 2014, in a team practice on the eve of the team's second game of the first round of the 2014 NBA playoffs, Turner and teammate Lance Stephenson got into an altercation. In Game 6 of the first round series against Atlanta with Indiana trailing 3–2, head coach Frank Vogel changed the rotation and Turner was left out, playing no minutes, while some of his playing time went to Rasual Butler. In Round 2 against the Washington Wizards, he returned to the lineup. In the first game of Round 3 against the two-time defending champion Miami Heat, he sat out with strep throat.

=== Boston Celtics (2014–2016) ===
After Indiana elected not to make Turner an $8.7 million qualifying offer, he became an unrestricted free agent. According to his agent, Turner agreed to sign with the Boston Celtics on July 21, 2014. He officially signed with the Celtics on September 29, 2014. He began the season as a reserve, but when Marcus Smart and Rajon Rondo endured concurrent injuries, Turner scored a team-high 19 points in a starting role in a win against the Chicago Bulls. On December 8, 2014, against the Washington Wizards, Turner forced overtime by sinking a three-point shot with 0.9 seconds left in regulation, but missed a 20-foot (6.1 m) jump shot with 0.9 seconds remaining in the second overtime which would have given the Celtics the lead. Chicago native Turner posted a season-high 29 points at the United Center against the Chicago Bulls on January 3. Turner hit his fourth (in eight attempts) career last second game winning shot with a three-pointer with 1.9 seconds left as his team trailed 89–87 against the Portland Trail Blazers on January 22, 2015. Then on February 11, 2015, he hit a game winner with 0.2 seconds left against Atlanta Hawks. Evan Turner posted his first career triple double on February 25, 2015, against the New York Knicks with 10 points, 10 assists and 12 rebounds. On March 13, 2015, Turner scored 24 of his season-high 30 points in the second half, including 16 in the fourth quarter to help the Celtics rally past the Orlando Magic. He posted two more triple doubles on March 23 against the Brooklyn Nets (19 points, 10 rebounds, and 12 assists) and on April 1 against the Indiana Pacers (13 points, 11 rebounds, and 12 assists). On April 10, he recorded a career-high 13 assists against the Cleveland Cavaliers. Turner played every game in the 2014–15 season and finished with averages of 14.5 points, 5.1 rebounds, and a career-high 6.5 assists per game. During the offseason, he was named as a participant in the first-ever NBA Africa Game.

On March 26, Turner posted a 17-point, 11-rebound double-double and blocked Devin Booker's potential game-tying shot with 3.9 seconds left against the Phoenix Suns.

=== Portland Trail Blazers (2016–2019) ===
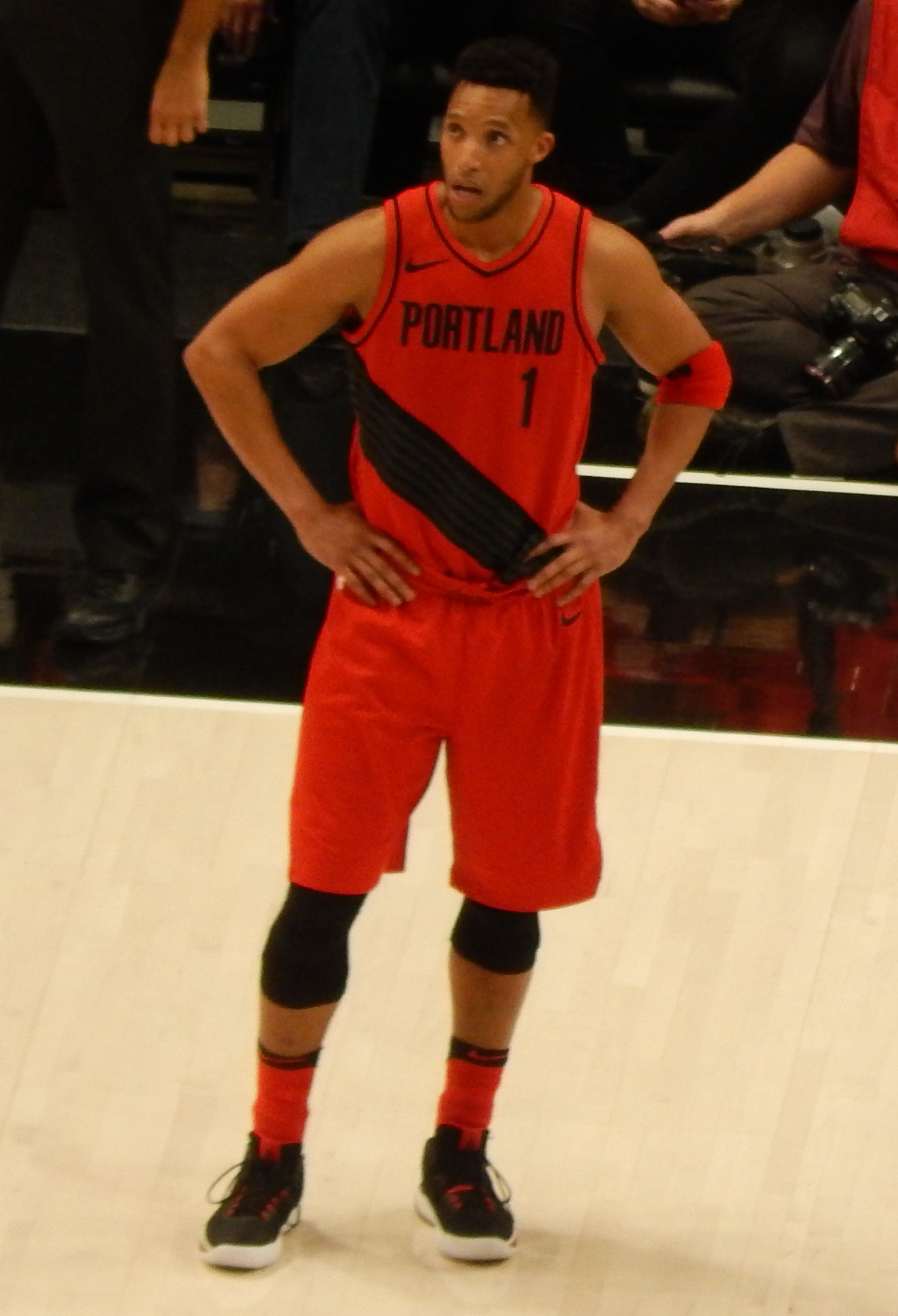
Turner in 2018

On July 6, 2016, Turner signed a four-year, $70 million contract with the Portland Trail Blazers. Turner battled Maurice Harkless for the starting small forward role through the preseason, but in the end he lost out. He debuted with a 3-point, 5-rebound and 5-assist performance in a 113–104 win over the Utah Jazz in 26 minutes off the bench. With Harkless injured on December 8, Turner started against the Memphis Grizzlies and notched a 15-point, 10-rebound double-double in an 88–86 loss, despite a pair of go-ahead free throws by Turner with 27 seconds left. On January 5, 2017, he scored 15 of his season-high 20 points in the fourth quarter of the Trail Blazers' 118–109 win over the Los Angeles Lakers. Turner's 11 assists off the bench on January 11 against the Cleveland Cavaliers was the most by a Portland reserve in nearly 3 years. On February 8, he was ruled out for approximately five to six weeks after sustaining a fracture of the third metacarpal in his right hand the night before playing against the Dallas Mavericks. He returned to action, wearing a protective brace, on March 18 after missing 14 games. The team was 7–7 without Turner. At the end of the season he finished with 13.0 points, the most since the 2014–15 season. He opened the 2017 NBA playoffs with a 12-point, 10-rebound double-double in a 12-point loss to the Golden State Warriors. The Trail Blazers were swept in four games, however.

On January 1, 2018, Turner scored a season-high 22 points in a 124–120 overtime win over the Chicago Bulls.

On April 1, 2019, Turner recorded his fourth career triple-double with 13 points, 11 rebounds and 10 assists off the bench in a 132–122 win over the Minnesota Timberwolves. He was a perfect 5 of 5 from the floor, making his triple-double just the seventh in NBA history to happen on five or fewer field goal attempts. Two days later, he had a second consecutive triple-double with 13 points, 12 rebounds and 11 assists off the bench in a 116–89 win over the Memphis Grizzlies, becoming the first Trail Blazer with back-to-back triple-doubles since Clyde Drexler in the 1989–90 season. After scoring just four points in the first six games of the Trail Blazers' second-round playoff series against the Denver Nuggets, Turner had 14 points, including 10 in the fourth quarter, in the deciding Game 7, helping Portland win 100–96 to advance through to the Western Conference Finals for the first time since 2000.

=== Atlanta Hawks (2019–2020) ===
On June 24, 2019, Turner was traded to the Atlanta Hawks in exchange for Kent Bazemore.

On February 5, 2020, Turner was traded to the Minnesota Timberwolves as part of a four-team trade, but didn't play a game for them.

=== Retirement ===
On November 30, 2020, Turner announced his retirement from professional basketball.

== Coaching career ==
For the 2020–21 season, Turner was an assistant coach for the Boston Celtics.

== NBA career statistics ==
Legend
GP	Games played	GS	Games started	MPG	Minutes per game
FG%	Field goal percentage	3P%	3-point field goal percentage	FT%	Free throw percentage
RPG	Rebounds per game	APG	Assists per game	SPG	Steals per game
BPG	Blocks per game	PPG	Points per game	**Bold**	Career high
*	Led the league

=== Regular season ===
Year	Team	GP	GS	MPG	FG%	3P%	FT%	RPG	APG	SPG	BPG	PPG
2010–11	Philadelphia	78	14	23.0	.425	.318	.808	3.9	2.0	.6	.2	7.2
2011–12	Philadelphia	65	20	26.4	.446	.224	.676	5.8	2.8	.6	.3	9.4
2012–13	Philadelphia	**82***	**82***	**35.3**	.419	.365	.740	**6.3**	4.3	.9	.2	13.3
2013–14	Philadelphia	54	54	34.9	.428	.288	.829	6.0	3.7	**1.0**	.1	**17.4**
2013–14	Indiana	27	2	21.1	.411	**.500**	.706	3.2	2.4	.4	.1	7.1
2014–15	Boston	**82**	57	27.6	.429	.277	.752	5.1	**6.5**	**1.0**	.2	9.5
2015–16	Boston	81	12	28.0	.456	.241	.827	4.9	4.4	**1.0**	.3	10.5
2016–17	Portland	65	12	25.5	.426	.263	.825	3.8	3.2	.8	**.4**	9.0
2017–18	Portland	79	40	25.7	.447	.318	.850	3.1	2.2	.6	**.4**	8.2
2018–19	Portland	73	2	22.0	**.460**	.212	.708	4.5	3.9	.5	.2	6.8
2019–20	Atlanta	19	0	13.2	.373	.000	**.857**	2.0	2.0	.5	**.4**	3.3
Career		705	295	26.9	.434	.294	.782	4.6	3.7	.8	.3	9.7

=== Playoffs ===
Year	Team	GP	GS	MPG	FG%	3P%	FT%	RPG	APG	SPG	BPG	PPG
2011	Philadelphia	5	0	19.4	**.447**	.800	**1.000**	4.6	.8	.6	.2	8.0
2012	Philadelphia	13	**12**	34.5	.364	.000	.688	**7.5**	2.5	.9	.5	11.2
2014	Indiana	12	0	12.4	.429	.571	**1.000**	2.2	1.6	.3	.0	3.3
2015	Boston	4	4	29.5	.364	.500	.889	7.3	**4.8**	.8	.0	10.5
2016	Boston	6	4	**35.7**	.365	.214	.778	5.7	4.5	1.3	**1.0**	**13.2**
2017	Portland	4	4	31.0	.364	.333	.750	5.8	3.8	**1.8**	.5	10.3
2018	Portland	3	3	29.0	.364	.286	**1.000**	4.0	3.3	1.0	.3	9.3
2019	Portland	**16**	0	15.3	.326	**1.000**	.800	4.6	2.2	.2	.2	2.7
Career		63	27	23.5	.372	.356	.765	5.0	2.6	.7	.3	7.3

== Personal life ==
Turner's mother is Iris James, and he has two older brothers named Darius and Richard.

On August 23, 2010, CNBC reported that Turner had signed a multi-year endorsement contract with Chinese apparel maker Li Ning Company Limited.

On December 20, 2017, a semi-trailer truck crashed into Turner's pool at his Portland home.

== See also ==
- 2010 NCAA Men's Basketball All-Americans
