= 2013–14 Los Angeles Lakers season =

Series of sports events

- Head coach: Mike D'Antoni
- President: Jeanie Buss
- General manager: Mitch Kupchak
- Owners: Jerry Buss family trust
- Arena: Staples Center

Results
- Record: 27–55 (.329)
- Place: Division: 5th (Pacific); Conference: 14th (Western)
- Playoff finish: Did not qualify
- Stats at Basketball Reference

Local media
- Television: TWC SportsNet and TWC Deportes
- Radio: 710 ESPN

The 2013–14 Los Angeles Lakers season was the 66th season of the franchise, its 65th season in the National Basketball Association (NBA), and its 54th season in Los Angeles. With Dwight Howard's departure to the Houston Rockets during the offseason, Kobe Bryant playing only six games due to injury, and injuries to many other players, the Lakers finished the season with a record of 27–55—the sixth-worst record in the league. The Lakers missed the playoffs for the first time since 2005. The team's 55 losses set a team record that was broken when the Lakers lost 61 games in the 2014–15 season.

The Lakers began the season 10–9. However, they entered the NBA All-Star break with seven straight losses at home, the worst streak in team history. Despite a 13–13 start, they went 14–42 the rest of the way. They were 18–35 and 13 games behind for the eighth and final playoff spot in the Western Conference, and only nine games behind the 9–43 Milwaukee Bucks for the worst record in the league and the best probability of the first overall pick in the NBA draft lottery. On March 6, they lost to the Los Angeles Clippers, their crosstown rivals, 142–94, with the 48-point margin being the most one-sided defeat in Lakers history. It was part of a three-game stretch during which the Lakers allowed an average of 136 points per game, the worst in their history; it matched the most allowed by an NBA team in three games over the past 23 years. Later that month, they were the first team in the league that was eliminated from playoff contention. It was just the third time in 38 seasons that they missed the playoffs. Their .329 winning percentage was the worst since 1957–58, before they had even moved to Los Angeles and when they were still playing in Minneapolis. Lakers players in 2013–14 missed 319 games due to injury, which led the NBA, and the team used 35 different starting lineups. In the final months of the season, the team often dressed just 10 or fewer healthy players, refusing to replace injured players for a few extra wins in a lost season. Following the season, Pau Gasol signed as a free agent with the Chicago Bulls.

== Key dates ==
- June 27: The 2013 NBA draft took place at Barclays Center in Brooklyn, New York.
- July 1: 2013 NBA free agency began.
- December 8: Kobe Bryant plays in first game since tearing his Achilles.
- December 17: Kobe Bryant suffers a broken bone in his knee while playing against the Memphis Grizzlies, but Los Angeles goes on to defeat them 96–92.
- February 4: Steve Blake, Jordan Hill, and Jodie Meeks get injured in a loss to the Minnesota Timberwolves.
- March 14: Following their loss to the San Antonio Spurs, the Lakers are eliminated from playoff contention. It was only the sixth time in history the Lakers did not make the playoffs.
- March 25: The Lakers hit a franchise record 51 points in one quarter against the New York Knicks, eventually winning 96–127.

== Draft picks ==
Round	Pick	Player	Position	Nationality	College/Team
2	48	Ryan Kelly	PF	United States	Duke

== Roster ==
2013–14 Los Angeles Lakers roster
Players

Pos.	No.	Player	Height	Weight	DOB	From
SG	6	Kent Bazemore	6 ft 5 in (1.96 m)	201 lb (91 kg)	1989-07-01	Old Dominion
SG	2	MarShon Brooks	6 ft 5 in (1.96 m)	200 lb (91 kg)	1989-01-26	Providence
SG	24	Kobe Bryant	6 ft 6 in (1.98 m)	205 lb (93 kg)	1978-08-23	Lower Merion HS (PA)
PG	1	Jordan Farmar	6 ft 2 in (1.88 m)	180 lb (82 kg)	1986-11-30	UCLA
F/C	16	Pau Gasol	7 ft 0 in (2.13 m)	250 lb (113 kg)	1980-08-07	Spain
SF	7	Xavier Henry	6 ft 6 in (1.98 m)	220 lb (100 kg)	1991-03-15	Kansas
PF	27	Jordan Hill	6 ft 10 in (2.08 m)	235 lb (107 kg)	1987-07-27	Arizona
SF	11	Wesley Johnson	6 ft 7 in (2.01 m)	215 lb (98 kg)	1987-07-11	Syracuse
C	9	Chris Kaman	7 ft 0 in (2.13 m)	265 lb (120 kg)	1982-04-28	Central Michigan
PF	4	Ryan Kelly	6 ft 11 in (2.11 m)	230 lb (104 kg)	1991-04-09	Duke
PG	12	Kendall Marshall	6 ft 4 in (1.93 m)	195 lb (88 kg)	1991-08-19	North Carolina
SG	20	Jodie Meeks	6 ft 4 in (1.93 m)	208 lb (94 kg)	1987-08-21	Kentucky
PG	10	Steve Nash	6 ft 3 in (1.91 m)	178 lb (81 kg)	1974-02-07	Santa Clara
C	50	Robert Sacre	7 ft 0 in (2.13 m)	260 lb (118 kg)	1989-06-06	Gonzaga
SG	0	Nick Young	6 ft 7 in (2.01 m)	210 lb (95 kg)	1985-06-01	USC

Coaches
Head coach
- Mike D'Antoni
Assistant(s)
- Dan D'Antoni
- Johnny Davis
- Kurt Rambis

Legend
- (DP) Unsigned draft pick
- (FA) Free agent
- (S) Suspended
- (DL) On assignment to D-League affiliate
- Injured

Roster
Updated: March 2, 2014

== Pre-season ==
2013 pre-season game log
Total: 4–4 (Home: 4–3; Road: 0–1)
Pre-season: 4–4 (home: 4–3; road: 0–1)

Game	Date	Team	Score	High points	High rebounds	High assists	Location Attendance	Record
1	October 5	Golden State	W 104–95	Xavier Henry (29)	Chris Kaman (10)	Jordan Farmar (7)	Citizens Business Bank Arena; 6,946	1–0
2	October 6	Denver	L 88–97	Xavier Henry (15)	Robert Sacre (8)	Steve Blake (7)	Staples Center; 16,722	1–1
3	October 8	Denver	W 90–88	Steve Blake (16)	Jordan Hill (12)	Steve Nash (5)	Citizens Business Bank Arena; 6,023	2–1
4	October 10	Sacramento	L 86–104	Jodie Meeks (19)	Kaman & Williams (6)	Pau Gasol (5)	MGM Grand Garden Arena; 10,188	2–2
5	October 15	Golden State	L 95–100	Nick Young (18)	Chris Kaman (10)	Steve Blake (8)	MasterCard Center; 17,114	2–3
6	October 18	@ Golden State	L 89–115	Pau Gasol (16)	Jordan Hill (8)	Steve Blake (6)	Mercedes-Benz Arena; 17,482	2–4
7	October 22	Utah	W 108–94	Jordan Farmar (20)	Gasol, Blake, Johnson (6)	Nick Young (4)	Staples Center; 17,186	3–4
8	October 25	Utah	W 111–106	Steve Blake (19)	Wesley Johnson (9)	Pau Gasol (7)	Honda Center; 14,808	4–4

2013–14 season schedule

== Regular season ==
=== Standings ===
Pacific Division	W	L	PCT	GB	Home	Road	Div	GP
y-Los Angeles Clippers	57	25	.695	–	34‍–‍7	23‍–‍18	12–4	82
x-Golden State Warriors	51	31	.622	6.0	27‍–‍14	24‍–‍17	11–5	82
Phoenix Suns	48	34	.585	9.0	26‍–‍15	22‍–‍19	8–8	82
Sacramento Kings	28	54	.341	29.0	17‍–‍24	11‍–‍30	3–13	82
Los Angeles Lakers	27	55	.329	30.0	14‍–‍27	13‍–‍28	6–10	82

Western Conference
#	Team	W	L	PCT	GB	GP
1	z-San Antonio Spurs *	62	20	.756	–	82
2	y-Oklahoma City Thunder *	59	23	.720	3.0	82
3	y-Los Angeles Clippers *	57	25	.695	5.0	82
4	x-Houston Rockets	54	28	.659	8.0	82
5	x-Portland Trail Blazers	54	28	.659	8.0	82
6	x-Golden State Warriors	51	31	.622	11.0	82
7	x-Memphis Grizzlies	50	32	.610	12.0	82
8	x-Dallas Mavericks	49	33	.598	13.0	82
9	Phoenix Suns	48	34	.585	14.0	82
10	Minnesota Timberwolves	40	42	.488	22.0	82
11	Denver Nuggets	36	46	.439	26.0	82
12	New Orleans Pelicans	34	48	.415	28.0	82
13	Sacramento Kings	28	54	.341	34.0	82
14	Los Angeles Lakers	27	55	.329	35.0	82
15	Utah Jazz	25	57	.305	37.0	82

=== Game log ===
2013–14 game log
Total: 27–55 (Home: 14–27; Road: 13–28)
October: 1–1 (home: 1–0; road: 0–1)

Game	Date	Team	Score	High points	High rebounds	High assists	Location Attendance	Record
1	October 29	L.A. Clippers	W 116–103	Xavier Henry (22)	Pau Gasol (13)	Jordan Farmar (6)	Staples Center; 18,997	1–0
2	October 30	@ Golden State	L 94–125	Meeks & Henry (14)	Gasol & Hill (7)	Jordan Farmar (5)	Oracle Arena; 19,596	1–1

November : 8–7 (home: 5–3; road: 3–4)

Game	Date	Team	Score	High points	High rebounds	High assists	Location Attendance	Record
3	November 1	San Antonio	L 85–91	Pau Gasol (20)	Pau Gasol (11)	Steve Blake (9)	Staples Center; 18,997	1–2
4	November 3	Atlanta	W 105–103	Xavier Henry (18)	Pau Gasol (13)	Steve Blake (7)	Staples Center; 18,997	2–2
5	November 5	@ Dallas	L 104–123	Nick Young (21)	Pau Gasol (8)	Jordan Farmar (7)	American Airlines Center; 19,670	2–3
6	November 7	@ Houston	W 99–98	Jodie Meeks (18)	Pau Gasol (12)	Jordan Farmar (7)	Toyota Center; 18,133	3–3
7	November 8	@ New Orleans	L 85–96	Chris Kaman (16)	Jordan Hill (13)	Steve Blake (8)	New Orleans Arena; 18,209	3–4
8	November 10	Minnesota	L 90–113	Steve Blake (19)	Pau Gasol (11)	Steve Blake (8)	Staples Center; 18,997	3–5
9	November 12	New Orleans	W 116–95	Jordan Hill (21)	Jordan Hill (11)	Steve Blake (10)	Staples Center; 18,426	4–5
10	November 13	@ Denver	L 99–111	Pau Gasol (25)	Jordan Hill (15)	Steve Blake (11)	Pepsi Center; 17,824	4–6
11	November 15	Memphis	L 86–89	Jodie Meeks (25)	Pau Gasol (13)	Steve Blake (10)	Staples Center; 18,997	4–7
12	November 17	Detroit	W 114–99	Jordan Hill (24)	Jordan Hill (17)	Steve Blake (16)	Staples Center; 18,997	5–7
13	November 22	Golden State	W 102–95	Pau Gasol (24)	Pau Gasol (10)	Jordan Farmar (8)	Staples Center; 18,997	6–7
14	November 24	Sacramento	W 100–86	Xavier Henry (21)	Jordan Hill (13)	Steve Blake (12)	Staples Center; 18,997	7–7
15	November 26	@ Washington	L 111–116	Jordan Farmar (22)	Jordan Hill (8)	Gasol & Farmar (8)	Verizon Center; 19,204	7–8
16	November 27	@ Brooklyn	W 99–94	Nick Young (26)	Jordan Hill (12)	Steve Blake (10)	Barclays Center; 17,732	8–8
17	November 29	@ Detroit	W 106–102	Wesley Johnson (27)	Pau Gasol (12)	Steve Blake (10)	Palace of Auburn Hills; 15,202	9–8

December : 4–11 (home: 1–6; road: 3–5)

Game	Date	Team	Score	High points	High rebounds	High assists	Location Attendance	Record
18	December 1	Portland	L 108–114	Xavier Henry (27)	Shawne Williams (8)	Steve Blake (9)	Staples Center; 18,997	9–9
19	December 6	@ Sacramento	W 106–100	Meeks & Gasol (19)	Jordan Hill (9)	Steve Blake (10)	Sleep Train Arena; 17,317	10–9
20	December 8	Toronto	L 94–106	Nick Young (19)	Bryant, Gasol & Hill (8)	Bryant & Blake (4)	Staples Center; 18,997	10–10
21	December 10	Phoenix	L 108–114	Kobe Bryant (20)	Jordan Hill (7)	Steve Blake (10)	Staples Center; 18,997	10–11
22	December 13	@ Oklahoma City	L 97–122	Nick Young (17)	Robert Sacre (8)	Kobe Bryant (13)	Chesapeake Energy Arena; 18,203	10–12
23	December 14	@ Charlotte	W 88–85	Kobe Bryant (21)	Jordan Hill (9)	Kobe Bryant (8)	Time Warner Cable Arena; 17,101	11–12
24	December 16	@ Atlanta	L 100–114	Nick Young (23)	Pau Gasol (10)	Kobe Bryant (6)	Philips Arena; 15,146	11–13
25	December 17	@ Memphis	W 96–92	Bryant & Gasol (21)	Pau Gasol (9)	Wesley Johnson (6)	FedExForum; 17,217	12–13
26	December 20	Minnesota	W 104–91	Nick Young (25)	Pau Gasol (13)	Pau Gasol (8)	Staples Center; 18,997	13–13
27	December 21	@ Golden State	L 83–102	Nick Young (20)	Chris Kaman (17)	Jodie Meeks (4)	Oracle Arena; 19,596	13–14
28	December 23	@ Phoenix	L 90–117	Nick Young (19)	Henry & Williams (6)	Jodie Meeks (4)	US Airways Center; 14,814	13–15
29	December 25	Miami	L 95–101	Nick Young (20)	Pau Gasol (13)	Gasol & Meeks (3)	Staples Center; 18,997	13–16
30	December 27	@ Utah	L 103–105	Nick Young (21)	Chris Kaman (10)	Jordan Farmar (7)	EnergySolutions Arena; 19,911	13–17
31	December 29	Philadelphia	L 104–111	Nick Young (26)	Jordan Hill (13)	Jordan Farmar (8)	Staples Center; 18,997	13–18
32	December 31	Milwaukee	L 79–94	Young & Gasol (25)	Shawne Williams (11)	Kendall Marshall (7)	Staples Center; 18,997	13–19

January : 3–12 (home: 1–4; road: 2–8)

Game	Date	Team	Score	High points	High rebounds	High assists	Location Attendance	Record
33	January 3	Utah	W 110–99	Pau Gasol (23)	Pau Gasol (17)	Kendall Marshall (15)	Staples Center; 18,997	14–19
34	January 5	Denver	L 115–137	Pau Gasol (25)	Pau Gasol (10)	Kendall Marshall (17)	Staples Center; 18,997	14–20
35	January 7	@ Dallas	L 97–110	Jodie Meeks (24)	Pau Gasol (13)	Kendall Marshall & Jodie Meeks (6)	American Airlines Center; 19,656	14–21
36	January 8	@ Houston	L 99–113	Nick Young (25)	Pau Gasol (12)	Kendall Marshall (8)	Toyota Center; 18,229	14–22
37	January 10	@ L.A. Clippers	L 87–123	Kendall Marshall (16)	Pau Gasol (8)	Kendall Marshall (10)	Staples Center; 19,316	14–23
38	January 14	Cleveland	L 118–120	Nick Young (28)	Pau Gasol (12)	Kendall Marshall (16)	Staples Center; 18,997	14–24
39	January 15	@ Phoenix	L 114–121	Pau Gasol (24)	Jordan Hill (10)	Kendall Marshall (13)	US Airways Center; 16,022	14–25
40	January 17	@ Boston	W 107–104	Pau Gasol (24)	Pau Gasol (13)	Kendall Marshall (14)	TD Garden; 18,624	15–25
41	January 19	@ Toronto	W 112–106	Nick Young (29)	Pau Gasol (9)	Kendall Marshall (11)	Air Canada Centre; 17,706	16–25
42	January 20	@ Chicago	L 100–102	Nick Young (31)	Pau Gasol (19)	Kendall Marshall (8)	United Center; 21,626	16–26
43	January 23	@ Miami	L 102–109	Jodie Meeks & Pau Gasol (22)	Pau Gasol (11)	Kendall Marshall (11)	American Airlines Arena; 19,608	16–27
44	January 24	@ Orlando	L 105–114	Pau Gasol (21)	Pau Gasol (11)	Kendall Marshall (14)	Amway Center; 16,101	16–28
45	January 26	@ New York	L 103–110	Jodie Meeks (24)	Pau Gasol(13)	Kendall Marshall(5)	Madison Square Garden; 19,812	16–29
46	January 28	Indiana	L 92–104	Meeks & Gasol(21)	Pau Gasol(13)	Kendall Marshall (13)	Staples Center; 18,997	16–30
47	January 31	Charlotte	L 100–110	Pau Gasol(24)	Pau Gasol(9)	Kendall Marshall (12)	Staples Center; 18,997	16–31

February : 4–8 (home: 2–5; road: 2–3)

Game	Date	Team	Score	High points	High rebounds	High assists	Location Attendance	Record
48	February 4	@ Minnesota	L 99–109	Nick Young (24)	Wesley Johnson (9)	Steve Nash (9)	Target Center; 12,559	16–32
49	February 5	@ Cleveland	W 119–108	Ryan Kelly (26)	Steve Blake (10)	Steve Blake (15)	Quicken Loans Arena; 15,205	17–32
50	February 7	@ Philadelphia	W 112–98	Steve Nash (19)	Kelly & Kaman (8)	Kendall Marshall (10)	Wells Fargo Center; 15,211	18–32
51	February 9	Chicago	L 86–92	Chris Kaman (27)	Chris Kaman (10)	Kendall Marshall (11)	Staples Center; 18,997	18–33
52	February 11	Utah	L 79–96	Chris Kaman (25)	Chris Kaman (14)	Steve Blake (8)	Staples Center; 18,209	18–34
53	February 13	Oklahoma City	L 103–107	Kaman & Johnson (19)	Chris Kaman (10)	Kendall Marshall (17)	Staples Center; 18,997	18–35
All-Star Break
54	February 19	Houston	L 108–134	Wesley Johnson (24)	Johnson & Hill (7)	Kendall Marshall (16)	Staples Center; 18,997	18–36
55	February 21	Boston	W 101–92	Kaman, Meeks & Gasol (16)	Jordan Hill (12)	Kendall Marshall (8)	Staples Center; 18,997	19–36
56	February 23	Brooklyn	L 102–108	Pau Gasol (22)	Pau Gasol (11)	Kendall Marshall (7)	Staples Center; 18,997	19–37
57	February 25	@ Indiana	L 98–118	Kent Bazemore (23)	Pau Gasol (9)	Jordan Farmar (7)	Bankers Life Fieldhouse; 18,165	19–38
58	February 26	@ Memphis	L 103–108	Jodie Meeks (19)	Pau Gasol (10)	Kendall Marshall (8)	FedExForum; 16,989	19–39
59	February 28	Sacramento	W 126–122	Jordan Farmar (30)	Wesley Johnson (12)	Kendall Marshall (10)	Staples Center; 18,997	20–39

March : 5–9 (home: 4–4; road: 1–5)

Game	Date	Team	Score	High points	High rebounds	High assists	Location Attendance	Record
60	March 3	@ Portland	W 107–106	Pau Gasol (22)	Pau Gasol (9)	Kendall Marshall (11)	Moda Center; 20,013	21–39
61	March 4	New Orleans	L 125–132	Pau Gasol (29)	Pau Gasol (12)	Kendall Marshall (10)	Staples Center; 18,436	21–40
62	March 6	L.A. Clippers	L 94–142	Pau Gasol (21)	Pau Gasol (7)	Kendall Marshall (7)	Staples Center; 18,488	21–41
63	March 7	@ Denver	L 126–134	Pau Gasol (25)	Ryan Kelly (11)	Kendall Marshall (14)	Pepsi Center; 18,248	21–42
64	March 9	Oklahoma City	W 114–110	Jodie Meeks (42)	Pau Gasol (11)	Kendall Marshall (10)	Staples Center; 18,997	22–42
65	March 13	@ Oklahoma City	L 102–131	Jodie Meeks (19)	Kent Bazemore (7)	Marshall & Kelly (6)	Chesapeake Energy Arena; 18,203	22–43
66	March 14	@ San Antonio	L 85–119	Pau Gasol (18)	Pau Gasol (11)	Kendall Marshall (9)	AT&T Center; 18,581	22–44
67	March 19	San Antonio	L 109–125	Xavier Henry (24)	Robert Sacre (11)	Pau Gasol (6)	Staples Center; 18,997	22–45
68	March 21	Washington	L 107–117	Meeks & Young (21)	Gasol & Hill (14)	Steve Nash (11)	Staples Center; 18,112	22–46
69	March 23	Orlando	W 103–94	Jordan Hill (28)	Jordan Hill (13)	Kent Bazemore (8)	Staples Center; 17,803	23–46
70	March 25	New York	W 127–96	Xavier Henry (22)	Chris Kaman (9)	Kendall Marshall (9)	Staples Center; 18,997	24–46
71	March 27	@ Milwaukee	L 105–108	Jordan Hill (28)	Jordan Hill (16)	Kendall Marshall (7)	BMO Harris Bradley Center; 15,439	24–47
72	March 28	@ Minnesota	L 107–143	Kent Bazemore (21)	Hill & Sacre (7)	Steve Nash (6)	Target Center; 16,442	24–48
73	March 30	Phoenix	W 115–99	Chris Kaman (28)	Chris Kaman (17)	Kendall Marshall (11)	Staples Center; 18,355	25–48

April : 2–7 (home: 0–5; road: 2–2)

Game	Date	Team	Score	High points	High rebounds	High assists	Location Attendance	Record
74	April 1	Portland	L 112–124	Nick Young (40)	Ryan Kelly (9)	Steve Nash (10)	Staples Center; 18,110	25–49
75	April 2	@ Sacramento	L 102–107	Jodie Meeks (21)	Jordan Hill (15)	Kendall Marshall (10)	Sleep Train Arena; 17,317	25–50
76	April 4	Dallas	L 95–107	Jodie Meeks (25)	Wesley Johnson (11)	Kendall Marshall (8)	Staples Center; 18,997	25–51
77	April 6	@ L.A. Clippers	L 97–120	Jordan Hill (22)	Robert Sacre (10)	Kendall Marshall (11)	Staples Center; 19,239	25–52
78	April 8	Houston	L 130–145	Nick Young (32)	Robert Sacre (6)	Jordan Farmar (8)	Staples Center; 18,131	25–53
79	April 11	Golden State	L 95–112	Nick Young (25)	Jordan Hill (12)	Young & Hill (4)	Staples Center; 18,997	25–54
80	April 13	Memphis	L 90–102	Jodie Meeks (20)	Wesley Johnson (15)	Kendall Marshall (9)	Staples Center; 18,997	25–55
81	April 14	@ Utah	W 119–104	Nick Young (41)	Robert Sacre (9)	Kendall Marshall (15)	EnergySolutions Arena; 19,911	26–55
82	April 16	@ San Antonio	W 113–100	Jordan Hill (18)	Jordan Hill (14)	Kendall Marshall (11)	AT&T Center; 18,581	27–55

2013–14 season schedule

== Player statistics ==
Legend
GP	Games played	GS	Games started	MPG	Minutes per game
FG%	Field-goal percentage	3P%	3-point field-goal percentage	FT%	Free-throw percentage
RPG	Rebounds per game	APG	Assists per game	SPG	Steals per game
BPG	Blocks per game	PPG	Points per game

=== Regular season ===
Player	GP	GS	MPG	FG%	3P%	FT%	RPG	APG	SPG	BPG	PPG
Kent Bazemore	23	15	28.0	.451	.371	.644	3.3	3.1	1.3	.3	13.1
Steve Blake	27	27	33.0	.378	.397	.800	3.8	7.6	1.3	.1	9.5
MarShon Brooks	18	0	12.7	.489	.579	.692	1.7	1.2	.7	.2	6.4
Kobe Bryant	6	6	29.5	.425	.188	.857	4.3	6.3	1.2	.2	13.8
Jordan Farmar	41	5	22.2	.415	.438	.746	2.5	4.9	.9	.2	10.1
Pau Gasol	60	60	31.4	.480	.286	.736	9.7	3.4	.5	1.5	17.4
Elias Harris	2	0	5.5	.000	.	.	.5	.5	.5	.0	.0
Manny Harris	9	0	20.0	.400	.350	.833	3.8	1.2	.4	.1	8.1
Xavier Henry	43	5	21.1	.417	.346	.655	2.7	1.2	1.0	.2	10.0
Jordan Hill	72	32	20.8	.549	.000	.685	7.4	.8	.4	.9	9.7
Wesley Johnson	79	62	28.4	.425	.369	.792	4.4	1.6	1.1	1.0	9.1
Chris Kaman	39	13	18.9	.509	.000	.765	5.9	1.5	.3	1.0	10.4
Ryan Kelly	59	25	22.2	.423	.338	.815	3.7	1.6	.5	.8	8.0
Kendall Marshall	54	45	29.0	.406	.399	.528	2.9	8.8	.9	.1	8.0
Jodie Meeks	77	70	33.2	.463	.401	.857	2.5	1.8	1.4	.1	15.7
Steve Nash	15	10	20.9	.383	.333	.917	1.9	5.7	.5	.1	6.8
Robert Sacre	65	13	16.8	.477	.	.681	3.9	.8	.4	.7	5.4
Shawne Williams	36	13	20.9	.380	.326	.700	4.6	.8	.5	.8	5.6
Nick Young	64	9	28.3	.435	.386	.825	2.6	1.5	.7	.2	17.9

== Awards, records and milestones ==
=== Awards ===
==== All-Star ====
Kobe Bryant (Did not participate due to injury)

== Transactions ==
Players added

Via draft

- Ryan Kelly

Via free agency

- Nick Young
- Chris Kaman
- Wesley Johnson
- Jordan Farmar
- Kendall Marshall

Via trade

- Kent Bazemore
- Marshon Brooks
Players lost

Via free agency

- Earl Clark
- Dwight Howard

Waived

- Chris Duhon
- Metta World Peace

Via trade

- Steve Blake

=== Additions ===
Additions
Player	Date acquired	Reason acquired	Former team
Robert Sacre	July 10	Re-signed	Los Angeles Lakers
Nick Young	July 11	Free agency	Philadelphia 76ers
Chris Kaman	July 12	Free agency	Dallas Mavericks
Wesley Johnson	July 15	Free agency	Phoenix Suns
Jordan Farmar	July 17	Contract buyout	Anadolu Efes
Kendall Marshall	December 20	Free Agency	Phoenix Suns

=== Subtractions ===
Subtractions
Player	Reason left	Date left	New team
Chris Duhon	Waived	June 29	Free Agent
Metta World Peace	Waived	July 11	New York Knicks
Earl Clark	Free agency	July 12	Cleveland Cavaliers
Dwight Howard	Free agency	July 13	Houston Rockets
Steve Blake	Traded	February 19	Golden State Warriors

== See also ==
- 2013–14 NBA season
