= 2012–13 Cleveland Cavaliers season =

NBA professional basketball team season

- Head coach: Byron Scott
- General manager: Chris Grant
- Owner: Dan Gilbert
- Arena: Quicken Loans Arena

Results
- Record: 24–58 (.293)
- Place: Division: 5th (Central); Conference: 13th (Eastern)
- Playoff finish: Did not qualify
- Stats at Basketball Reference

Local media
- Television: Fox Sports Ohio; WUAB
- Radio: WTAM

The 2012–13 Cleveland Cavaliers season was the 43rd season of the franchise in the National Basketball Association (NBA).

== Key dates ==
- June 28 – The 2012 NBA draft took place in Newark, New Jersey, at the Prudential Center.

== Draft picks ==
Round	Pick	Player	Position	Nationality	College/Club Team
1	4	Dion Waiters	SG	United States	Syracuse
1	24	Jared Cunningham ^{[a]} ^{[b]}	SG	United States	Oregon State
2	33	Bernard James ^{[b]}	PF	United States	Florida State
2	34	Jae Crowder ^{[b]}	SF	United States	Marquette

- ^{a} Pick obtained from the Los Angeles Lakers the previous season.
- ^{b} Rights to Jared Cunningham, Bernard James and Jae Crowder were traded to the Dallas Mavericks on draft day for right to Tyler Zeller.

== Roster ==
2012–13 Cleveland Cavaliers roster
Players

Pos.	No.	Player	Height	Weight	DOB	From
SF	36	Omri Casspi	6 ft 9 in (2.06 m)	225 lb (102 kg)	1988-06-22	Israel
SG	21	Wayne Ellington	6 ft 4 in (1.93 m)	200 lb (91 kg)	1987-11-29	North Carolina
SF	33	Alonzo Gee	6 ft 6 in (1.98 m)	219 lb (99 kg)	1987-05-29	Alabama
PG	1	Daniel Gibson	6 ft 2 in (1.88 m)	200 lb (91 kg)	1986-02-27	Texas
PG	2	Kyrie Irving	6 ft 3 in (1.91 m)	191 lb (87 kg)	1992-03-23	Duke
PF	5	Kevin Jones	6 ft 8 in (2.03 m)	260 lb (118 kg)	1989-08-25	West Virginia
PG	14	Shaun Livingston	6 ft 7 in (2.01 m)	175 lb (79 kg)	1985-09-11	Peoria Central (IL)
SF	0	C. J. Miles	6 ft 6 in (1.98 m)	222 lb (101 kg)	1987-03-18	Skyline HS (TX)
SG	20	Chris Quinn	6 ft 2 in (1.88 m)	185 lb (84 kg)	1983-09-27	Notre Dame
C	15	Marreese Speights	6 ft 10 in (2.08 m)	255 lb (116 kg)	1987-08-04	Florida
F/C	13	Tristan Thompson	6 ft 9 in (2.06 m)	227 lb (103 kg)	1991-03-13	Texas
C	17	Anderson Varejão	6 ft 11 in (2.11 m)	260 lb (118 kg)	1982-09-28	Brazil
SG	3	Dion Waiters	6 ft 4 in (1.93 m)	215 lb (98 kg)	1991-12-10	Syracuse
F	4	Luke Walton	6 ft 8 in (2.03 m)	235 lb (107 kg)	1980-03-28	Arizona
C	40	Tyler Zeller	7 ft 0 in (2.13 m)	250 lb (113 kg)	1990-01-17	North Carolina

Coaches
Head coach
- Byron Scott
Assistant(s)
- Paul Pressey
- Jamahl Mosley
- Joe Prunty
- Nate Tibbetts

Legend
- (DP) Unsigned draft pick
- (FA) Free agent
- (S) Suspended
- (DL) On assignment to D-League affiliate
- Injured

Roster
Updated: March 20, 2013

== Pre-season ==
2012 pre-season game log
Pre-season: 3–4 (home: 2–3; road: 1–1)

Game	Date	Team	Score	High points	High rebounds	High assists	Location Attendance	Record
1	October 8	Montepaschi Siena	W 91–85	Samardo Samuels (14)	Anderson Varejão (8)	Four players (3)	Quicken Loans Arena; 12,468	1–0
2	October 9	Milwaukee	L 80–97	C. J. Miles (18)	Tristan Thompson (7)	Jeremy Pargo (5)	Canton Memorial Civic Center; 3,942	1–1
3	October 12	@ Chicago	W 86–83	Dion Waiters (18)	Anderson Varejão (10)	Daniel Gibson (4)	Assembly Hall; 8,678	2–1
4	October 13	Washington	L 95–99	Tristan Thompson (18)	Three players (10)	Kyrie Irving (7)	Quicken Loans Arena; 10,140	2–2
5	October 15	Orlando	W 114–111 (OT)	Kyrie Irving (22)	Anderson Varejão (8)	Daniel Gibson, Jeremy Pargo (5)	US Bank Arena; 5,219	3–2
6	October 17	@ Philadelphia	L 99–113	Kyrie Irving (23)	Tristan Thompson (10)	Alonzo Gee, Jeremy Pargo (4)	Wells Fargo Center; 8,170	3–3
7	October 23	Indiana	L 82–100	Kyrie Irving (20)	Anderson Varejão, Tyler Zeller (7)	Alonzo Gee (3)	Quicken Loans Arena; 10,040	3–4

2012–13 season schedule

== Regular season ==
=== Game log ===
2012–13 game log
Total: 24–58 (Home: 14–27; Road: 10–31)
October: 1–0 (home: 1–0; road: 0–0)

Game	Date	Team	Score	High points	High rebounds	High assists	Location Attendance	Record
1	October 30	Washington	W 94–84	Kyrie Irving (29)	Anderson Varejão (23)	Anderson Varejão (9)	Quicken Loans Arena; 20,562	1–0

November : 3–12 (home: 1–3; road: 2–9)

Game	Date	Team	Score	High points	High rebounds	High assists	Location Attendance	Record
2	November 2	Chicago	L 86–115	Kyrie Irving (15)	Samuels, Thompson, & Varejão(5)	Donald Sloan (5)	Quicken Loans Arena; 20,562	1–1
3	November 3	@ Milwaukee	L 102–105	Kyrie Irving (27)	Anderson Varejão (17)	Kyrie Irving (7)	BMO Harris Bradley Center; 17,086	1–2
4	November 5	@ L. A. Clippers	W 108–101	Dion Waiters (28)	Anderson Varejão (15)	Kyrie Irving (10)	Staples Center; 19,060	2-2
5	November 7	@ Golden State	L 96–106	Kyrie Irving (28)	Tristan Thompson (10)	Kyrie Irving (7)	Oracle Arena; 18,124	2–3
6	November 9	@ Phoenix	L 105–107	Dion Waiters (23)	Anderson Varejão (10)	Kyrie Irving (8)	US Airways Center; 15,236	2–4
7	November 11	@ Oklahoma City	L 91–106	Kyrie Irving (20)	Thompson & Varejão (8)	Anderson Varejão (6)	Chesapeake Energy Arena; 18,203	2–5
8	November 13	@ Brooklyn	L 101–114	Anderson Varejão (35)	Anderson Varejão (18)	Kyrie Irving (8)	Barclays Center; 17,032	2–6
9	November 17	Dallas	L 95–103	Kyrie Irving (26)	Tristan Thompson (12)	Daniel Gibson (5)	Quicken Loans Arena; 18,633	2–7
10	November 18	@ Philadelphia	L 79–86	Alonzo Gee (17)	Anderson Varejão (15)	Kyrie Irving (4)	Wells Fargo Center; 15,021	2–8
11	November 21	Philadelphia	W 92–83	Jeremy Pargo (28)	Anderson Varejão (19)	Dion Waiters (6)	Quicken Loans Arena; 16,743	3–8
12	November 23	@ Orlando	L 104–108	Dion Waiters (25)	Anderson Varejão (17)	Daniel Gibson (6)	Amway Center; 17,334	3–9
13	November 24	@ Miami	L 108–110	Pargo & Waiters (16)	Anderson Varejão (15)	Jeremy Pargo (7)	American Airlines Arena; 20,064	3–10
14	November 26	@ Memphis	L 78–84	Varejão & Waiters (15)	Anderson Varejão (22)	Pargo, Varejão, & Waiters (3)	FedExForum; 13,485	3–11
15	November 27	Phoenix	L 78–91	Anderson Varejão (20)	Anderson Varejão (18)	Dion Waiters (7)	Quicken Loans Arena; 13,687	3–12
16	November 30, 2012	@ Atlanta	W 113–111	Jeremy Pargo (22)	Anderson Varejão (18)	Dion Waiters (7)	Philips Arena; 13,094	4–12

December : 3–13 (home: 1–7; road: 2–6)

Game	Date	Team	Score	High points	High rebounds	High assists	Location Attendance	Record
17	December 1	Portland	L 117–118	Alonzo Gee (22)	Anderson Varejão (17)	Jeremy Pargo (8)	Quicken Loans Arena; 16,624	4–13
18	December 3	@ Detroit	L 79–89	Anderson Varejão (17)	Anderson Varejão (18)	Jeremy Pargo (8)	The Palace of Auburn Hills; 11,352	4–14
19	December 5	Chicago	L 85–95	Donald Sloan (14)	Anderson Varejão (15)	Jeremy Pargo (4)	Quicken Loans Arena; 17,893	4–15
20	December 7	@ Minnesota	L 73–91	Alonzo Gee (16)	Anderson Varejão (14)	Daniel Gibson (4)	Quicken Loans Arena; 16,623	4–16
21	December 8	Detroit	L 97–104	Jeremy Pargo (24)	Anderson Varejão (13)	Daniel Gibson (6)	Quicken Loans Arena; 16,062	4–17
22	December 11	L. A. Lakers	W 100–94	Irving & Miles (28)	Tristan Thompson (10)	Kyrie Irving (11)	Quicken Loans Arena; 19,172	5–17
23	December 12	@ Indiana	L 81–96	C. J. Miles (28)	Anderson Varejão (12)	Gee & Irving (4)	Bankers Life Fieldhouse; 11,595	5–18
24	December 14	Milwaukee	L 86–90	Kyrie Irving (26)	Anderson Varejão (18)	Alonzo Gee (5)	Quicken Loans Arena; 14,146	5–19
25	December 15	@ New York	L 102–103	Kyrie Irving (41)	Miles & Varejão (8)	Irving & Varejão (5)	Madison Square Garden; 19,033	5-20
26	December 18	Toronto	L 99–113	Kyrie Irving (23)	Anderson Varejão (10)	Kyrie Irving (7)	Quicken Loans Arena; 13,233	5-21
27	December 19	@ Boston	L 91–103	Kyrie Irving (22)	Tristan Thompson (12)	Dion Waiters (4)	TD Garden; 18,624	5-22
28	December 21	Indiana	L 89–99	Kyrie Irving (17)	Tristan Thompson (13)	Dion Waiters (7)	Quicken Loans Arena; 14,105	5-23
29	December 22	@ Milwaukee	W 94–82	Dion Waiters (18)	Tristan Thompson (14)	Irving & Walton (4)	BMO Harris Bradley Center; 14,176	6-23
30	December 26	@ Washington	W 87–84	Kyrie Irving (26)	Tristan Thompson (12)	Kyrie Irving (8)	Verizon Center; 13,846	7-23
31	December 28, 2012	Atlanta	L 94–102	Kyrie Irving (28)	Tristan Thompson (8)	Kyrie Irving (5)	Quicken Loans Arena; 19,443	7-24
32	December 29	@ Brooklyn	L 100–103	C. J. Miles (33)	Tristan Thompson (15)	Kyrie Irving (7)	Barclays Center; 17,732	7-25

January : 6–8 (home: 3–3; road: 3–5)

Game	Date	Team	Score	High points	High rebounds	High assists	Location Attendance	Record
33	January 2	Sacramento	L 94–97	Kyrie Irving (22)	Tristan Thompson (13)	Gee & Irving (6)	Quicken Loans Arena; 12,331	7-26
34	January 4	@ Charlotte	W 106–104	Kyrie Irving (33)	Tristan Thompson (13)	Kyrie Irving (6)	Time Warner Cable Arena; 15,576	8-26
35	January 5	Houston	L 104–112	Kyrie Irving (30)	Tristan Thompson (16)	Kyrie Irving (6)	Quicken Loans Arena; 16,866	8-27
36	January 7	@ Chicago	L 92–118	Dion Waiters (18)	Tristan Thompson (8)	Kyrie Irving (6)	United Center; 21,355	8-28
37	January 9, 2013	Atlanta	W 99–83	Kyrie Irving (33)	Tristan Thompson (14)	Shaun Livingston (5)	Quicken Loans Arena; 13,149	9-28
38	January 11	@ Denver	L 91–98	Kyrie Irving (28)	Tyler Zeller (8)	Kyrie Irving (7)	Pepsi Center; 16,445	9-29
39	January 13	@ L. A. Lakers	L 93–113	Irving & Waiters (15)	Tristan Thompson (8)	Kyrie Irving (7)	Staples Center; 18,997	9-30
40	January 14	@ Sacramento	L 118–124	Dion Waiters (33)	Tristan Thompson (15)	Dion Waiters (5)	Sleep Train Arena; 12,194	9-31
41	January 16	@ Portland	W 93–88	Kyrie Irving (31)	Tristan Thompson (14)	Kyrie Irving (5)	Rose Garden; 18,880	10–31
42	January 19	@ Utah	L 98–109	Dion Waiters (23)	Tyler Zeller (14)	Kyrie Irving (9)	EnergySolutions Arena; 19,911	10–32
43	January 22	Boston	W 95–90	Kyrie Irving (40)	Tyler Zeller (10)	Luke Walton (7)	Quicken Loans Arena; 14,192	11–32
44	January 25	Milwaukee	W 113–108	Kyrie Irving (35)	Alonzo Gee (8)	Luke Walton (7)	Quicken Loans Arena; 15,098	12–32
45	January 26	@ Toronto	W 99–98	Kyrie Irving (32)	Tyler Zeller (12)	Kyrie Irving (5)	Air Canada Centre; 18,820	13–32
46	January 29	Golden State	L 95–108	Thompson & Waiters (18)	Tristan Thompson (11)	Dion Waiters (7)	Quicken Loans Arena; 13,939	13–33

February : 7–5 (home: 5–3; road: 2–2)

Game	Date	Team	Score	High points	High rebounds	High assists	Location Attendance	Record
47	February 1	@ Detroit	L 99–117	Tristan Thompson (19)	Tristan Thompson (9)	Shaun Livingston (6)	The Palace of Auburn Hills; 15,693	13–34
48	February 2	Oklahoma City	W 115–110	Kyrie Irving (35)	Tristan Thompson (12)	Livingston & Waiters (6)	Quicken Loans Arena; 20,562	14–34
49	February 6	Charlotte	W 122–95	Kyrie Irving (22)	Marreese Speights (10)	Shaun Livingston (6)	Quicken Loans Arena; 13,264	15–34
50	February 8	Orlando	W 119–108	Kyrie Irving (24)	Kyrie Irving (6)	Kyrie Irving (8)	Quicken Loans Arena; 14,073	16–34
51	February 9	Denver	L 103–111	Kyrie Irving (26)	Irving & Zeller (6)	Kyrie Irving (7)	Quicken Loans Arena; 20,562	16–35
52	February 11	Minnesota	L 92–100	Kyrie Irving (20)	Tristan Thompson (9)	Kyrie Irving (7)	Quicken Loans Arena; 11,556	16–36
53	February 13	San Antonio	L 95–96	Dion Waiters (20)	Speights & Zeller (9)	Kyrie Irving (7)	Quicken Loans Arena; 12,162	16–37
All-Star Break
54	February 20	New Orleans	W 105–100	Kyrie Irving (35)	Tristan Thompson (13)	Kyrie Irving (7)	Quicken Loans Arena; 16,103	17–37
55	February 23	@ Orlando	W 118–94	Marreese Speights (18)	Tristan Thompson (11)	Kyrie Irving (9)	Amway Center; 17,171	18–37
56	February 24	@ Miami	L 105–109	Dion Waiters (26)	Tristan Thompson (12)	Kyrie Irving (5)	American Airlines Arena; 20,006	18–38
57	February 26	@ Chicago	W 101–98	Dion Waiters (25)	Tristan Thompson (8)	Luke Walton (5)	United Center; 21,501	19–38
58	February 27	Toronto	W 103–92	Dion Waiters (23)	Marreese Speights (9)	Luke Walton (7)	Quicken Loans Arena; 13,368	20–38

March : 2–12 (home: 2–7; road: 0–5)

Game	Date	Team	Score	High points	High rebounds	High assists	Location Attendance	Record
59	March 1	L. A. Clippers	L 89–105	Dion Waiters (17)	Tristan Thompson (12)	Dion Waiters (6)	Quicken Loans Arena; 20,562	20–39
60	March 4	New York	L 97–102	Marreese Speights (23)	Tristan Thompson (8)	Luke Walton (12)	Quicken Loans Arena; 19,784	20–40
61	March 6	Utah	W 104–101	Kyrie Irving (20)	Tristan Thompson (12)	Kyrie Irving (10)	Quicken Loans Arena; 12,124	21–40
62	March 8	Memphis	L 92–103	Kyrie Irving (24)	Tristan Thompson (10)	Luke Walton (5)	Quicken Loans Arena; 17,032	21–41
63	March 10	@ Toronto	L 96–100	Dion Waiters (21)	Tristan Thompson (10)	Kyrie Irving (4)	Air Canada Centre; 19,800	21–42
64	March 12	Washington	W 95–90	Dion Waiters (20)	Tristan Thompson (14)	Shaun Livingston (6)	Quicken Loans Arena; 14,689	22–42
65	March 15	@ Dallas	L 86–96	Dion Waiters (21)	Tyler Zeller (10)	Shaun Livingston (6)	American Airlines Center; 20,482	22–43
66	March 16	@ San Antonio	L 113–119	Wayne Ellington (21)	Tristan Thompson (8)	Luke Walton (7)	AT&T Center; 18,581	22–44
67	March 18	Indiana	L 90–111	C. J. Miles (21)	Tristan Thompson (11)	Tyler Zeller (4)	Quicken Loans Arena; 13,016	22–45
68	March 20	Miami	L 95–98	Wayne Ellington (20)	Tyler Zeller (11)	Shaun Livingston (6)	Quicken Loans Arena; 20,562	22–46
69	March 22	@ Houston	L 78–116	Shaun Livingston (14)	Tristan Thompson (8)	Shaun Livingston (2)	Toyota Center; 15,694	22–47
70	March 27	Boston	L 92–93	Wayne Ellington (16)	Tristan Thompson (9)	Daniel Gibson (6)	Quicken Loans Arena; 17,130	22–48
71	March 29	Philadelphia	L 87–97	C. J. Miles (19)	Tyler Zeller (10)	Luke Walton (7)	Quicken Loans Arena; 17,324	22–49
72	March 31	@ New Orleans	L 92–112	Kyrie Irving (31)	Tristan Thompson (10)	Kyrie Irving (6)	New Orleans Arena; 11,008	22–50

April: 2–8 (home: 1–4; road: 1–4)

Game	Date	Team	Score	High points	High rebounds	High assists	Location Attendance	Record
73	April 1	@ Atlanta	L 94–102	Marreese Speights (23)	Alonzo Gee (8)	Shaun Livingston (6)	Philips Arena; 13,026	22–51
74	April 3	Brooklyn	L 95–113	Kyrie Irving (16)	Marreese Speights (10)	Kyrie Irving (6)	Quicken Loans Arena; 14,863	22–52
75	April 5	@ Boston	W 97–91	Tristan Thompson (29)	Tristan Thompson (17)	Kyrie Irving (8)	TD Garden; 18,624	23–52
76	April 7	Orlando	W 91–85	Alonzo Gee (19)	Tristan Thompson (16)	Kyrie Irving (10)	Quicken Loans Arena; 16,341	24–52
77	April 9	@ Indiana	L 94–99	Kyrie Irving (29)	Tristan Thompson (7)	Kyrie Irving (7)	Bankers Life Fieldhouse; 15,279	24–53
78	April 10	Detroit	L 104–111	Kyrie Irving (27)	Marreese Speights (9)	Kyrie Irving (9)	Quicken Loans Arena; 13,844	24–54
79	April 12	New York	L 91–101	Kyrie Irving (31)	Tristan Thompson (11)	Kyrie Irving (6)	Quicken Loans Arena; 19,430	24–55
80	April 14	@ Philadelphia	L 77–91	Thompson, Speights & Ellington (12)	Tristan Thompson (12)	Daniel Gibson (5)	Wells Fargo Center; 18,764	24–56
81	April 15	Miami	L 95–96	Kyrie Irving (16)	Tristan Thompson (13)	Kyrie Irving (8)	Quicken Loans Arena; 19,091	24–57
82	April 17	@ Charlotte	L 98–105	Kyrie Irving (24)	Tristan Thompson (10)	Kyrie Irving (10)	Time Warner Cable Arena; 13,487	24–58

2012–13 season schedule

=== Standings ===
Central Division	W	L	PCT	GB	Home	Road	Div	GP
y-Indiana Pacers	49	32	.605	–	30–11	19–21	13–3	81†
x-Chicago Bulls	45	37	.549	4.5	24–17	21–20	9–7	82
x-Milwaukee Bucks	38	44	.463	11.5	21–20	17–24	7–9	82
Detroit Pistons	29	53	.354	20.5	18–23	11–30	8–8	82
Cleveland Cavaliers	24	58	.293	25.5	14–27	10–31	3–13	82

Eastern Conference
#	Team	W	L	PCT	GB	GP
1	z-Miami Heat *	66	16	.805	–	82
2	y-New York Knicks *	54	28	.659	12.0	82
3	y-Indiana Pacers *	49	32	.605	16.5	81
4	x-Brooklyn Nets	49	33	.598	17.0	82
5	x-Chicago Bulls	45	37	.549	21.0	82
6	x-Atlanta Hawks	44	38	.537	22.0	82
7	x-Boston Celtics	41	40	.506	24.5	81
8	x-Milwaukee Bucks	38	44	.463	28.0	82
9	Philadelphia 76ers	34	48	.415	32.0	82
10	Toronto Raptors	34	48	.415	32.0	82
11	Washington Wizards	29	53	.354	37.0	82
12	Detroit Pistons	29	53	.354	37.0	82
13	Cleveland Cavaliers	24	58	.293	42.0	82
14	Charlotte Bobcats	21	61	.256	45.0	82
15	Orlando Magic	20	62	.244	46.0	82

== Injuries ==
- Starting point guard Kyrie Irving broke his right hand on July 14, 2012, during a Cavaliers training session and underwent surgery a few days later. Irving returned to the Cavaliers line-up in time for the start of the pre-season.

== Player statistics ==
Legend
GP	Games played	GS	Games started	MPG	Minutes per game
FG%	Field-goal percentage	3P%	3-point field-goal percentage	FT%	Free-throw percentage
RPG	Rebounds per game	APG	Assists per game	SPG	Steals per game
BPG	Blocks per game	PPG	Points per game

=== Regular season ===
Player	GP	GS	MPG	FG%	3P%	FT%	RPG	APG	SPG	BPG	PPG
Tristan Thompson	82	82	31.3	.488	.000	.608	9.4	1.3	.7	.9	11.7
Alonzo Gee	82	82	31.0	.410	.315	.795	3.9	1.6	1.3	.4	10.3
Tyler Zeller	77	55	26.4	.438	.000	.764	5.7	1.2	.5	.9	7.9
C. J. Miles	65	13	21.0	.415	.384	.869	2.7	1.0	.8	.3	11.2
Dion Waiters	61	48	28.8	.412	.310	.746	2.4	3.0	1.0	.3	14.7
Kyrie Irving	59	59	34.7	.452	.391	.855	3.7	5.9	1.5	.4	22.5
Luke Walton	50	0	17.1	.392	.299	.500	2.9	3.3	.8	.3	3.4
Shaun Livingston^{†}	49	12	23.2	.507	.000	.843	2.5	3.6	.8	.6	7.2
Daniel Gibson	46	3	20.0	.340	.344	.703	1.3	1.8	.7	.1	5.4
Omri Casspi	43	1	11.7	.394	.329	.537	2.7	.7	.6	.3	4.0
Marreese Speights^{†}	39	1	18.5	.457	.200	.806	5.1	.7	.4	.7	10.2
Wayne Ellington^{†}	38	17	25.9	.439	.371	.898	3.0	1.6	.8	.1	10.4
Kevin Jones	32	0	10.4	.402		.600	2.4	.3	.3	.2	3.0
Anderson Varejão	25	25	36.0	.478	.000	.755	14.4	3.4	1.5	.6	14.1
Jeremy Pargo^{†}	25	11	17.9	.401	.316	.683	1.3	2.6	.5	.1	7.8
Donald Sloan^{†}	20	0	12.9	.346	.368	.800	1.4	1.9	.3	.0	4.1
Samardo Samuels	18	1	10.9	.367	.000	.583	1.6	.4	.2	.2	3.2
Jon Leuer^{†}	9	0	10.1	.357	.000	.333	1.4	.6	.2	.0	2.4
Chris Quinn	7	0	11.1	.250	.000	1.000	.3	1.3	.4	.0	1.4

- ^{†} Denotes player spent time with another team in the season. Stats reflect time with the Cavaliers only.

== Transactions ==
=== Overview ===
Players Added

Via draft

- Dion Waiters

Via free agency

- Kevin Anderson ^{[a]}
- Micheal Eric
- Justin Holiday ^{[a]}
- Kevin Jones
- Jon Leuer
- C. J. Miles

Via trade

- Kelenna Azubuike ^{[a]}
- Jeremy Pargo
- Tyler Zeller
Players Lost

Via trade

- D. J. Kennedy

Via free agency

- Antawn Jamison

Waived

- Manny Harris

^{a} Waived before the start of the regular season.

=== Trades ===
June 28, 2012 (Draft day)	To Cleveland Cavaliers Draft rights to Tyler Zeller; Kelenna Azubuike	To Dallas Mavericks Draft rights to Jared Cunningham; Draft rights to Bernard James; Draft rights to Jae Crowder
July 25, 2012	To Cleveland Cavaliers Jeremy Pargo; 2014 second round pick Cash considerations	To Memphis Grizzlies D. J. Kennedy
January 22, 2013	To Cleveland Cavaliers Wayne Ellington; Josh Selby; Marreese Speights future first round pick	To Memphis Grizzlies Jon Leuer

=== Free agents ===
Additions
Player	Date signed	Former team
Luke Harangody	July 11	Cleveland Cavaliers (re-signed)
Jon Leuer	July 20	Houston Rockets
C. J. Miles	August 8	Utah Jazz
Micheal Eric	August 10	Temple University (Undrafted in 2012)
Alonzo Gee	September 10	Cleveland Cavaliers (re-signed)
Kevin Jones	September 28	West Virginia University (Undrafted in 2012)
Kevin Anderson	September 28	Strasbourg IG (France)
Jeremy Pargo	September 28	Memphis Grizzlies
Justin Holiday	October 1	Generali Okapi Aalstar (Belgium)

Subtractions
Player	Reason Left	New team
Antawn Jamison	Free Agency	Los Angeles Lakers
Justin Holiday	Waived	Portland Trail Blazers
Manny Harris	Waived	BC Azovmash (Ukraine)
