= 2012–13 Orlando Magic season =

NBA professional basketball team season

- Head coach: Jacque Vaughn
- General manager: Rob Hennigan
- Owners: RDV Sports, Inc.
- Arena: Amway Center

Results
- Record: 20–62 (.244)
- Place: Division: 5th (Southeast); Conference: 15th (Eastern)
- Playoff finish: Did not qualify
- Stats at Basketball Reference

Local media
- Television: Fox Sports Florida; Sun Sports
- Radio: WDBO

The 2012–13 Orlando Magic season was the 24th season of the franchise in the National Basketball Association (NBA). The Magic were eliminated from playoff contention with their 115–109 loss to the Milwaukee Bucks on March 17, 2013. This marked the first time since the 2005–06 season that the Magic failed to qualify for the playoffs. Ending the season with a 20–62 record, the Magic finished with the worst record in the NBA. This was also the worst record posted by the Magic since their inaugural season in 1989–90. This was also the first season since 2003–04 that All-Star center Dwight Howard was not on the roster, as he was traded to the Los Angeles Lakers (his first stint) on August 10, 2012.

== Key dates ==
- June 28: The 2012 NBA draft took place at Prudential Center in Newark, New Jersey.

== Draft picks ==
| Round | Pick | Player | Position | Nationality | College |
|---|---|---|---|---|---|
| 1 | 19 | Andrew Nicholson | PF | Canada | St. Bonaventure |
| 2 | 49 | Kyle O'Quinn | Center | United States | Norfolk State |

== Roster ==
2012–13 Orlando Magic roster
Players

| Pos. | No. | Player | Height | Weight | DOB | From |
|---|---|---|---|---|---|---|
| G/F | 4 | Arron Afflalo | 6 ft 5 in (1.96 m) | 215 lb (98 kg) | 1985-10-15 | UCLA |
| F/C | 11 | Glen Davis | 6 ft 9 in (2.06 m) | 289 lb (131 kg) | 1986-01-01 | LSU |
| F | 21 | Maurice Harkless | 6 ft 8 in (2.03 m) | 210 lb (95 kg) | 1993-05-11 | St. John's |
| F | 3 | Al Harrington | 6 ft 9 in (2.06 m) | 245 lb (111 kg) | 1980-02-17 | St. Patrick HS (NJ) |
| F | 12 | Tobias Harris | 6 ft 8 in (2.03 m) | 226 lb (103 kg) | 1992-07-15 | Tennessee |
| G/F | 20 | DeQuan Jones | 6 ft 8 in (2.03 m) | 221 lb (100 kg) | 1990-06-20 | Miami (FL) |
| G | 1 | Doron Lamb | 6 ft 4 in (1.93 m) | 210 lb (95 kg) | 1991-11-06 | Kentucky |
| G | 55 | E'Twaun Moore | 6 ft 4 in (1.93 m) | 191 lb (87 kg) | 1989-02-25 | Purdue |
| G | 14 | Jameer Nelson | 6 ft 0 in (1.83 m) | 190 lb (86 kg) | 1982-02-09 | Saint Joseph's |
| F | 44 | Andrew Nicholson | 6 ft 9 in (2.06 m) | 250 lb (113 kg) | 1989-12-08 | St. Bonaventure |
| F | 2 | Kyle O'Quinn | 6 ft 10 in (2.08 m) | 240 lb (109 kg) | 1990-03-26 | Norfolk State |
| F | 15 | Hedo Türkoğlu | 6 ft 10 in (2.08 m) | 220 lb (100 kg) | 1979-03-19 | Turkey |
| G | 19 | Beno Udrih | 6 ft 3 in (1.91 m) | 203 lb (92 kg) | 1982-07-05 | Slovenia |
| C | 9 | Nikola Vučević | 7 ft 0 in (2.13 m) | 240 lb (109 kg) | 1990-10-24 | USC |

Coaches
Head coach
- Jacque Vaughn
Assistant(s)
- Brett Gunning
- Wes Unseld Jr.
- James Borrego
- Laron Profit
- Luke Stuckey

Legend
- (DP) Unsigned draft pick
- (FA) Free agent
- (S) Suspended
- (DL) On assignment to D-League affiliate
- Injured

Roster
Updated: February 23, 2013

== Pre-season ==
2012 pre-season game log
Pre-season: 2–6 (home: 2–2; road: 0–4)

| Game | Date | Team | Score | High points | High rebounds | High assists | Location Attendance | Record |
|---|---|---|---|---|---|---|---|---|
| 1 | October 7 | @ New Orleans | W 85–80 | E'Twaun Moore (16) | Nikola Vučević (9) | E'Twaun Moore (7) | Mexico City Arena; 18,133 | 0–1 |
| 2 | October 11 | Philadelphia | L 95–102 | Glen Davis (16) | Glen Davis (12) | Gustavo Ayón, JJ Redick (5) | Amway Center; 18,106 | 0–2 |
| 3 | October 15 | @ Cleveland | L 111–114 (OT) | Glen Davis (27) | DeQuan Jones, Andrew Nicholson (9) | JJ Redick (8) | Quicken Loans Arena; 5,219 | 0–3 |
| 4 | October 16 | @ Detroit | L 86–112 | DeQuan Jones (22) | Gustavo Ayón (10) | E'Twaun Moore (6) | The Palace of Auburn Hills; 9,229 | 0–4 |
| 5 | October 19 | Indiana | W 112–96 | Glen Davis (21) | Hedo Türkoğlu, Nikola Vučević (7) | JJ Redick (8) | Amway Center; 17,204 | 1–4 |
| 6 | October 21 | San Antonio | W 104–100 | Andrew Nicholson (18) | Nikola Vučević (9) | E'Twaun Moore (8) | Amway Arena; 17,012 | 2–4 |
| 7 | October 24 | @ Memphis | L 100–115 | JJ Redick (23) | Nikola Vučević (9) | Jameer Nelson (7) | FedExForum; 10,263 | 2–5 |
| 8 | October 26 | Houston | L 92–108 | E'Twaun Moore (18) | Nikola Vučević (14) | Kyle O'Quinn (5) | Amway Center; 17,109 | 2–6 |

2012–13 season schedule

== Regular season ==
=== Standings ===
| Southeast Division | W | L | PCT | GB | Home | Road | Div | GP |
|---|---|---|---|---|---|---|---|---|
| z-Miami Heat | 66 | 16 | .805 | – | 37–4 | 29–12 | 15–1 | 82 |
| x-Atlanta Hawks | 44 | 38 | .537 | 22 | 25–16 | 19–22 | 11–5 | 82 |
| Washington Wizards | 29 | 53 | .354 | 37 | 22–19 | 7–34 | 5–11 | 82 |
| Charlotte Bobcats | 21 | 61 | .256 | 45 | 15–26 | 6–35 | 6–10 | 82 |
| Orlando Magic | 20 | 62 | .244 | 46 | 12–29 | 8–33 | 3–13 | 82 |

Eastern Conference
| # | Team | W | L | PCT | GB | GP |
|---|---|---|---|---|---|---|
| 1 | z-Miami Heat * | 66 | 16 | .805 | – | 82 |
| 2 | y-New York Knicks * | 54 | 28 | .659 | 12.0 | 82 |
| 3 | y-Indiana Pacers * | 49 | 32 | .605 | 16.5 | 81 |
| 4 | x-Brooklyn Nets | 49 | 33 | .598 | 17.0 | 82 |
| 5 | x-Chicago Bulls | 45 | 37 | .549 | 21.0 | 82 |
| 6 | x-Atlanta Hawks | 44 | 38 | .537 | 22.0 | 82 |
| 7 | x-Boston Celtics | 41 | 40 | .506 | 24.5 | 81 |
| 8 | x-Milwaukee Bucks | 38 | 44 | .463 | 28.0 | 82 |
| 9 | Philadelphia 76ers | 34 | 48 | .415 | 32.0 | 82 |
| 10 | Toronto Raptors | 34 | 48 | .415 | 32.0 | 82 |
| 11 | Washington Wizards | 29 | 53 | .354 | 37.0 | 82 |
| 12 | Detroit Pistons | 29 | 53 | .354 | 37.0 | 82 |
| 13 | Cleveland Cavaliers | 24 | 58 | .293 | 42.0 | 82 |
| 14 | Charlotte Bobcats | 21 | 61 | .256 | 45.0 | 82 |
| 15 | Orlando Magic | 20 | 62 | .244 | 46.0 | 82 |

=== Game log ===
2012–13 game log
Total: 20–62 (Home: 12–29; Road: 8–33)
November: 5–10 (home: 4–5; road: 1–5)

| Game | Date | Team | Score | High points | High rebounds | High assists | Location Attendance | Record |
|---|---|---|---|---|---|---|---|---|
| 1 | November 2 | Denver | W 102–89 | Glen Davis (29) | Glen Davis (10) | Jameer Nelson (7) | Amway Center; 18,846 | 1–0 |
| 2 | November 4 | Phoenix | W 115–94 | JJ Redick (24) | Nikola Vučević (13) | Moore & Redick (6) | Amway Center; 17,022 | 2–0 |
| 3 | November 6 | @ Chicago | L 93–99 | Arron Afflalo (28) | Davis & Vučević (10) | JJ Redick (7) | United Center; 21,216 | 2–1 |
| 4 | November 7 | @ Minnesota | L 75–90 | JJ Redick (16) | Glen Davis (6) | Davis, Moore, & Smith (4) | Target Center; 17,121 | 2–2 |
| 5 | November 9 | Brooklyn | L 68–107 | E'Twaun Moore (18) | Afflalo & Vučević (5) | Davis & Moore (5) | Amway Center; 17,532 | 2–3 |
| 6 | November 11 | @ Brooklyn | L 74–82 | Afflalo & Davis (19) | Nikola Vučević (12) | JJ Redick (9) | Barclays Center; 16,523 | 2–4 |
| 7 | November 13 | New York | L 89–99 | JJ Redick (18) | Nikola Vučević (10) | E'Twaun Moore (8) | Amway Center; 18,846 | 2–5 |
| 8 | November 16 | @ Detroit | W 110–106 | JJ Redick (23) | Davis & Vučević (13) | Jameer Nelson (10) | The Palace of Auburn Hills; 11,594 | 3–5 |
| 9 | November 18 | @ Toronto | L 86–97 | Davis & Moore (16) | Glen Davis (12) | Jameer Nelson (9) | Air Canada Centre; 18,702 | 3–6 |
| 10 | November 19 | @ Atlanta | L 72–81 | Glen Davis (11) | Nikola Vučević (13) | E'Twaun Moore (4) | Philips Arena; 15,006 | 3–7 |
| 11 | November 21 | Detroit | W 90–74 | Andrew Nicholson (15) | Glen Davis (14) | Nelson & Redick (7) | Amway Center; 17,199 | 4–7 |
| 12 | November 23 | Cleveland | W 108–104 | Jameer Nelson (22) | Davis & Vučević (8) | Nelson & Redick (6) | Amway Center; 17,334 | 5–7 |
| 13 | November 25 | Boston | L 110–116 (OT) | Jameer Nelson (20) | Josh McRoberts (14) | Arron Afflalo (6) | Amway Center; 17,307 | 5–8 |
| 14 | November 28 | San Antonio | L 89–110 | Arron Afflalo (16) | DeQuan Jones (6) | JJ Redick (4) | Amway Center; 17,271 | 5–9 |
| 15 | November 30 | Brooklyn | L 86–98 | Glen Davis (16) | Maurice Harkless (7) | Moore & Redick (4) | Amway Center; 17,103 | 5–10 |

December : 7–9 (home: 3–5; road: 4–4)

| Game | Date | Team | Score | High points | High rebounds | High assists | Location Attendance | Record |
|---|---|---|---|---|---|---|---|---|
| 16 | December 2 | @ L.A. Lakers | W 113–103 | Arron Afflalo (30) | Davis & Vučević (12) | Jameer Nelson (13) | Staples Center; 18,997 | 6–10 |
| 17 | December 3 | @ Golden State | W 102–94 | Davis & Nelson (24) | Nikola Vučević (15) | Jameer Nelson (9) | Oracle Arena; 18,117 | 7–10 |
| 18 | December 5 | @ Utah | L 81–87 | Glen Davis (18) | Nikola Vučević (16) | Jameer Nelson (5) | EnergySolutions Arena; 18,078 | 7–11 |
| 19 | December 7 | @ Sacramento | L 82–91 | Glen Davis (20) | Glen Davis (11) | Jameer Nelson (6) | Sleep Train Arena; 16,305 | 7–12 |
| 20 | December 9 | @ Phoenix | W 98–90 | JJ Redick (20) | Vučević & Nicholson (9) | JJ Redick (9) | US Airways Center; 13,565 | 8–12 |
| 21 | December 12 | Atlanta | L 80–86 | Arron Afflalo (16) | Davis & Nicholson (7) | Afflalo, Ayón, & Moore (4) | Amway Center; 16,992 | 8–13 |
| 22 | December 14 | Golden State | W 99–85 | JJ Redick (16) | Nikola Vučević (17) | Jameer Nelson (11) | Amway Center; 17,040 | 9–13 |
| 23 | December 15 | @ Charlotte | W 107–98 | Afflalo & Davis (20) | Nikola Vučević (13) | Jameer Nelson (6) | Time Warner Cable Arena; 16,217 | 10–13 |
| 24 | December 17 | Minnesota | W 102–93 | Glen Davis (28) | Nikola Vučević (11) | Jameer Nelson (12) | Amway Center; 16,992 | 11–13 |
| 25 | December 19 | Washington | W 90–82 | JJ Redick (17) | Nikola Vučević (13) | Jameer Nelson (5) | Amway Center; 16,893 | 12–13 |
| 26 | December 21 | @ Toronto | L 90–93 | Arron Afflalo (26) | Gustavo Ayón (13) | Jameer Nelson (7) | Air Canada Centre; 18,391 | 12–14 |
| 27 | December 23 | Utah | L 93–97 | Arron Afflalo (20) | Nikola Vučević (16) | Jameer Nelson (9) | Amway Center; 17,721 | 12–15 |
| 28 | December 26 | New Orleans | L 94–97 | Jameer Nelson (28) | Nikola Vučević (9) | Jameer Nelson (10) | Amway Center; 18,846 | 12–16 |
| 29 | December 28 | @ Washington | L 97–105 | Arron Afflalo (26) | Nikola Vučević (11) | Jameer Nelson (8) | Verizon Center; 15,789 | 12–17 |
| 30 | December 29 | Toronto | L 88–123 | Andrew Nicholson (22) | Nikola Vučević (9) | Afflalo & Smith (6) | Amway Center; 18,846 | 12–18 |
| 31 | December 31 | Miami | L 110–112 (OT) | Arron Afflalo (28) | Nikola Vučević (29) | Hedo Türkoğlu (8) | Amway Center; 19,311 | 12–19 |

January : 2–12 (home: 1–6; road: 1–6)

| Game | Date | Team | Score | High points | High rebounds | High assists | Location Attendance | Record |
|---|---|---|---|---|---|---|---|---|
| 32 | January 2 | Chicago | L 94–96 | Jameer Nelson (32) | Nikola Vučević (12) | Josh McRoberts (5) | Amway Center; 18,846 | 12–20 |
| 33 | January 5 | New York | L 106–114 | Afflalo & Nelson (29) | Nikola Vučević (18) | Jameer Nelson (8) | Amway Center; 19,171 | 12–21 |
| 34 | January 7 | @ Portland | L 119–125 (OT) | JJ Redick (29) | Nikola Vučević (13) | Jameer Nelson (12) | Rose Garden; 19,560 | 12–22 |
| 35 | January 9 | @ Denver | L 105–108 | Jameer Nelson (20) | Nikola Vučević (14) | Jameer Nelson (8) | Pepsi Center; 15,084 | 12–23 |
| 36 | January 12 | @ L.A. Clippers | W 104–101 | Arron Afflalo (30) | Nikola Vučević (15) | Jameer Nelson (9) | Staples Center; 19,060 | 13–23 |
| 37 | January 14 | @ Washington | L 91–120 | Jameer Nelson (19) | Nikola Vučević (13) | Jameer Nelson (12) | Verizon Center; 14,648 | 13–24 |
| 38 | January 16 | Indiana | W 97–86 | Nikola Vučević (16) | Nikola Vučević (15) | Nelson & Redick (6) | Amway Center; 17,499 | 14–24 |
| 39 | January 18 | Charlotte | L 100–106 | Arron Afflalo (23) | Nikola Vučević (9) | Jameer Nelson (7) | Amway Center; 17,598 | 14–25 |
| 40 | January 20 | Dallas | L 105–111 | Glen Davis (24) | Nikola Vučević (11) | Glen Davis (6) | Amway Center; 18,192 | 14–26 |
| 41 | January 22 | @ Detroit | L 90–105 | JJ Redick (26) | Afflalo & Vučević (9) | Jameer Nelson (9) | The Palace of Auburn Hills; 11,798 | 14–27 |
| 42 | January 24 | Toronto | L 95–97 | Nikola Vučević (19) | Nikola Vučević (14) | Jameer Nelson (11) | Amway Center; 17,145 | 14–28 |
| 43 | January 27 | Detroit | L 102–104 | JJ Redick (31) | Nikola Vučević (17) | Jameer Nelson (8) | Amway Center; 17,959 | 14–29 |
| 44 | January 28 | @ Brooklyn | L 77–97 | Nikola Vučević (18) | Nikola Vučević (9) | JJ Redick (10) | Barclays Center; 16,480 | 14–30 |
| 45 | January 30 | @ New York | L 97–113 | JJ Redick (29) | Nikola Vučević (11) | Jameer Nelson (9) | Madison Square Garden; 19,033 | 14–31 |

February : 2–10 (home: 1–4; road: 1–6)

| Game | Date | Team | Score | High points | High rebounds | High assists | Location Attendance | Record |
|---|---|---|---|---|---|---|---|---|
| 46 | February 1 | @ Boston | L 84–97 | JJ Redick (15) | Nikola Vučević (14) | JJ Redick (5) | TD Garden; 18,624 | 14–32 |
| 47 | February 2 | @ Milwaukee | L 98–107 | Nikola Vučević (20) | Maurice Harkless (14) | JJ Redick (8) | BMO Harris Bradley Center; 14,321 | 14–33 |
| 48 | February 4 | @ Philadelphia | L 61–78 | E'Twaun Moore (18) | Nikola Vučević (14) | McRoberts & Türkoğlu (6) | Wells Fargo Center; 14,630 | 14–34 |
| 49 | February 6 | L.A. Clippers | L 76–86 | Jameer Nelson (18) | Nikola Vučević (14) | E'Twaun Moore (5) | Amway Center; 17,995 | 14–35 |
| 50 | February 8 | @ Cleveland | L 108–119 | Nikola Vučević (25) | Nikola Vučević (13) | Jameer Nelson (13) | Quicken Loans Arena; 14,073 | 14–36 |
| 51 | February 10 | Portland | W 110–102 | JJ Redick (22) | Nikola Vučević (19) | Jameer Nelson (15) | Amway Center; 17,966 | 15–36 |
| 52 | February 13 | Atlanta | L 76–108 | Nelson & Nicholson (10) | Kyle O'Quinn (8) | Jameer Nelson (4) | Amway Center; 17,649 | 15–37 |
All-Star Break
| 53 | February 19 | Charlotte | L 92–105 | Afflalo & Vučević (18) | Andrew Nicholson (12) | Jameer Nelson (6) | Amway Center; 17,037 | 15–38 |
| 54 | February 20 | @ Dallas | L 96–111 | Arron Afflalo (21) | Nikola Vučević (13) | Afflalo & Nelson (7) | American Airlines Center; 19,965 | 15–39 |
| 55 | February 22 | @ Memphis | L 82–88 | Arron Afflalo (20) | Nikola Vučević (11) | Afflalo & Moore (7) | FedExForum; 17,669 | 15–40 |
| 56 | February 23 | Cleveland | L 94–118 | Arron Afflalo (16) | O'Quinn & Vučević (7) | Beno Udrih (7) | Amway Center; 17,171 | 15–41 |
| 57 | February 26 | @ Philadelphia | W 98–84 | Afflalo & Harris (16) | Nikola Vučević (19) | E'Twaun Moore (10) | Wells Fargo Center; 18,432 | 16–41 |
| 58 | February 27 | Sacramento | L 101–125 | Tobias Harris (23) | Arron Afflalo (7) | Beno Udrih (8) | Amway Center; 16,722 | 16–42 |

March : 3–13 (home: 2–6; road: 1–7)

| Game | Date | Team | Score | High points | High rebounds | High assists | Location Attendance | Record |
|---|---|---|---|---|---|---|---|---|
| 59 | March 1 | Houston | L 110–118 | Tobias Harris (27) | Harris & Vučević (10) | E'Twaun Moore (11) | Amway Center; 16,677 | 16–43 |
| 60 | March 3 | Memphis | L 82–108 | Afflalo, Moore, & Nicholson (12) | Maurice Harkless (6) | E'Twaun Moore (6) | Amway Center; 16,020 | 16–44 |
| 61 | March 4 | @ New Orleans | W 105–102 | Arron Afflalo (26) | Nikola Vučević (11) | Jameer Nelson (7) | New Orleans Arena; 11,050 | 17–44 |
| 62 | March 6 | @ Miami | L 96–97 | Nikola Vučević (25) | Nikola Vučević (21) | Jameer Nelson (14) | American Airlines Arena; 20,001 | 17–45 |
| 63 | March 8 | Indiana | L 86–115 | Arron Afflalo (19) | Tobias Harris (8) | Beno Udrih (7) | Amway Center; 16,515 | 17–46 |
| 64 | March 10 | Philadelphia | W 99–91 | Jameer Nelson (24) | Nikola Vučević (17) | Jameer Nelson (10) | Amway Center; 16,317 | 18–46 |
| 65 | March 12 | L.A. Lakers | L 97–106 | Jameer Nelson (21) | Tobias Harris (15) | Jameer Nelson (7) | Amway Center; 19,287 | 18–47 |
| 66 | March 15 | @ Oklahoma City | L 104–117 | Jameer Nelson (26) | Nikola Vučević (14) | Jameer Nelson (7) | Chesapeake Energy Arena; 18,203 | 18–48 |
| 67 | March 17 | @ Milwaukee | L 109–115 | Arron Afflalo (24) | Nikola Vučević (15) | Jameer Nelson (7) | BMO Harris Bradley Center; 15,591 | 18–49 |
| 68 | March 19 | @ Indiana | L 73–95 | Afflalo & Harkless (10) | Nikola Vučević (11) | Arron Afflalo (3) | Bankers Life Fieldhouse; 14,343 | 18–50 |
| 69 | March 20 | @ New York | L 94–106 | Harris & Nicholson (14) | Kyle O'Quinn (14) | Beno Udrih (8) | Madison Square Garden; 19,033 | 18–51 |
| 70 | March 22 | Oklahoma City | L 89–97 | Maurice Harkless (25) | Tobias Harris (15) | Jameer Nelson (10) | Amway Center; 17,429 | 18–52 |
| 71 | March 25 | Miami | L 94–108 | Jameer Nelson (27) | Harkless & Moore (9) | Jameer Nelson (12) | Amway Center; 18,846 | 18–53 |
| 72 | March 27 | @ Charlotte | L 108–114 | Tobias Harris (29) | Kyle O'Quinn (11) | Jameer Nelson (11) | Time Warner Cable Arena; 11,839 | 18–54 |
| 73 | March 29 | Washington | W 97–92 | Tobias Harris (30) | Tobias Harris (11) | Beno Udrih (9) | Amway Center; 17,998 | 19–54 |
| 74 | March 30 | @ Atlanta | L 88–97 | Beno Udrih (20) | Nikola Vučević (15) | Beno Udrih (8) | Philips Arena; 17,152 | 19–55 |

April : 1–7 (home: 1–2; road: 0–5)

| Game | Date | Team | Score | High points | High rebounds | High assists | Location Attendance | Record |
|---|---|---|---|---|---|---|---|---|
| 75 | April 1 | @ Houston | L 103–111 | Maurice Harkless (28) | Nikola Vučević (13) | Beno Udrih (10) | Toyota Center; 16,273 | 19–56 |
| 76 | April 3 | @ San Antonio | L 84–98 | Maurice Harkless (18) | Nikola Vučević (14) | Beno Udrih (8) | AT&T Center; 18,581 | 19–57 |
| 77 | April 5 | @ Chicago | L 86–87 | Beno Udrih (27) | Nikola Vučević (15) | Beno Udrih (7) | United Center; 22,268 | 19–58 |
| 78 | April 7 | @ Cleveland | L 85–91 | Tobias Harris (26) | Nikola Vučević (21) | Udrih & Vučević (6) | Quicken Loans Arena; 16,341 | 19–59 |
| 79 | April 10 | Milwaukee | W 113–103 (OT) | Harris & Vučević (30) | Nikola Vučević (20) | Beno Udrih (11) | Amway Center; 17,127 | 20–59 |
| 80 | April 13 | Boston | L 88–120 | Tobias Harris (22) | Nikola Vučević (12) | Beno Udrih (8) | Amway Center; 17,422 | 20–60 |
| 81 | April 15 | Chicago | L 84–102 | Tobias Harris (20) | Nikola Vučević (14) | Tobias Harris (4) | Amway Center; 17,297 | 20–61 |
| 82 | April 17 | @ Miami | L 93–105 | Nikola Vučević (20) | Nikola Vučević (13) | Beno Udrih (14) | American Airlines Center; 19,949 | 20–62 |

2012–13 season schedule

== Player statistics ==
=== Regular season ===
| Player | POS | GP | GS | MP | REB | AST | STL | BLK | PTS | MPG | RPG | APG | SPG | BPG | PPG |
|---|---|---|---|---|---|---|---|---|---|---|---|---|---|---|---|
| Nikola Vučević | C | 77 | 77 | 2,559 | 917 | 143 | 61 | 79 | 1,008 | 33.2 | 11.9 | 1.9 | .8 | 1.0 | 13.1 |
| Maurice Harkless | SF | 76 | 59 | 1,974 | 335 | 50 | 88 | 62 | 625 | 26.0 | 4.4 | .7 | 1.2 | .8 | 8.2 |
| Andrew Nicholson | PF | 75 | 28 | 1,249 | 258 | 44 | 24 | 32 | 587 | 16.7 | 3.4 | .6 | .3 | .4 | 7.8 |
| E'Twaun Moore | SG | 75 | 21 | 1,682 | 167 | 206 | 51 | 23 | 588 | 22.4 | 2.2 | 2.7 | .7 | .3 | 7.8 |
| Arron Afflalo | SF | 64 | 64 | 2,307 | 239 | 206 | 40 | 11 | 1,057 | 36.0 | 3.7 | 3.2 | .6 | .2 | 16.5 |
| DeQuan Jones | SF | 63 | 17 | 803 | 105 | 16 | 19 | 22 | 233 | 12.7 | 1.7 | .3 | .3 | .3 | 3.7 |
| Kyle O'Quinn | C | 57 | 5 | 638 | 209 | 52 | 11 | 26 | 232 | 11.2 | 3.7 | .9 | .2 | .5 | 4.1 |
| Jameer Nelson | PG | 56 | 56 | 1,977 | 209 | 413 | 71 | 6 | 822 | 35.3 | 3.7 | 7.4 | 1.3 | .1 | 14.7 |
| JJ Redick^{†} | SG | 50 | 11 | 1,575 | 119 | 220 | 29 | 5 | 756 | 31.5 | 2.4 | 4.4 | .6 | .1 | 15.1 |
| Gustavo Ayón^{†} | C | 43 | 3 | 571 | 140 | 59 | 13 | 13 | 153 | 13.3 | 3.3 | 1.4 | .3 | .3 | 3.6 |
| Josh McRoberts^{†} | PF | 41 | 3 | 685 | 137 | 70 | 10 | 12 | 159 | 16.7 | 3.3 | 1.7 | .2 | .3 | 3.9 |
| Ish Smith^{†} | PG | 36 | 3 | 378 | 46 | 57 | 13 | 6 | 85 | 10.5 | 1.3 | 1.6 | .4 | .2 | 2.4 |
| Glen Davis | PF | 34 | 33 | 1,064 | 246 | 70 | 32 | 21 | 512 | 31.3 | 7.2 | 2.1 | .9 | .6 | 15.1 |
| Tobias Harris^{†} | PF | 27 | 20 | 974 | 230 | 56 | 24 | 37 | 467 | 36.1 | 8.5 | 2.1 | .9 | 1.4 | 17.3 |
| Beno Udrih^{†} | PG | 27 | 9 | 738 | 63 | 164 | 25 | 1 | 275 | 27.3 | 2.3 | 6.1 | .9 | .0 | 10.2 |
| Doron Lamb^{†} | SG | 24 | 0 | 297 | 29 | 12 | 6 | 0 | 76 | 12.4 | 1.2 | .5 | .3 | .0 | 3.2 |
| Hedo Türkoğlu | SF | 11 | 1 | 189 | 26 | 23 | 7 | 1 | 32 | 17.2 | 2.4 | 2.1 | .6 | .1 | 2.9 |
| Al Harrington | C | 10 | 0 | 119 | 27 | 10 | 4 | 1 | 51 | 11.9 | 2.7 | 1.0 | .4 | .1 | 5.1 |

- ^{†} Denotes player spent time with another team in the season. Stats reflect time with the Magic only.

== Transactions ==
=== Overview ===
Players Added

Via draft

- Andrew Nicholson
- Kyle O'Quinn

Via free agency

- Armon Johnson ^{[a]}
- Chris Johnson
- DeQuan Jones
- E'Twaun Moore

Via trade

- Arron Afflalo
- Gustavo Ayón
- Christian Eyenga ^{[a]}
- Maurice Harkless
- Al Harrington
- Josh McRoberts
- Nikola Vučević
Players Lost

Via trade

- Ryan Anderson
- Earl Clark
- Chris Duhon
- Dwight Howard
- Jason Richardson

Via free agency

- DeAndre Liggins
- Daniel Orton

- ^{a} Waived during the pre-season.

=== Trades ===
| July 11, 2012 | To Orlando Magic Gustavo Ayón | To New Orleans Hornets Ryan Anderson (sign and trade) |
| August 10, 2012 | To Orlando Magic Arron Afflalo (from Denver Nuggets); Al Harrington (from Denver Nuggets); Nikola Vučević (from Philadelphia 76ers); Maurice Harkless (from Philadelphia 76ers); Josh McRoberts (from Los Angeles Lakers); Christian Eyenga (from Los Angeles Lakers); 2013 second-round pick (from Denver); 2014 first-round pick (from Denver or New York); 2015 conditional first-round pick (from Philadelphia); 2015 conditional second-round pick (from L. A. Lakers); 2017 conditional second-round pick (from L. A. Lakers) | To Los Angeles Lakers Dwight Howard; Earl Clark; Chris Duhon To Philadelphia 76ers Jason Richardson |

=== Free agency ===
Additions
| Player | Date signed | Former team |
|---|---|---|
| Jameer Nelson | July 16 | Orlando Magic (re-signed) |
| Ish Smith | August 15 | Orlando Magic (re-signed) |
| E'Twaun Moore | September 6 | Houston Rockets (claimed off waivers) |
| Armon Johnson | September 29 | Brooklyn Nets |
| DeQuan Jones | September 29 | University of Miami (undrafted in 2012) |
| Chris Johnson | October 9 | Los Angeles Clippers (claimed off waivers) |

Subtractions
| Player | Date signed | New Team |
|---|---|---|
| Daniel Orton | August 4 | Oklahoma City Thunder |
| DeAndre Liggins | September 12 | Oklahoma City Thunder |
