= 2012–13 Chicago Bulls season =

NBA professional basketball team season

- Head coach: Tom Thibodeau
- President: Michael Reinsdorf
- General manager: Gar Forman
- Owners: Jerry Reinsdorf
- Arena: United Center

Results
- Record: 45–37 (.549)
- Place: Division: 2nd (Central); Conference: 5th (Eastern)
- Playoff finish: Conference Semifinals (lost to Heat 1–4)
- Stats at Basketball Reference

Local media
- Television: WGN (25 games); WGN America (20 games); WCIU (8 games); Comcast SportsNet Chicago (42 games); Comcast Sportsnet Chicago Plus (5 games)
- Radio: WMVP

The 2012–13 Chicago Bulls season was the 47th season of the franchise in the National Basketball Association (NBA). Derrick Rose missed the entire season while still recovering from a torn ACL in which he sustained during Game 1 of last year's playoffs. Despite his absence, the Bulls still managed a 45–37 record as the Number 5 seed in the East. The only highlights of this season were the Bulls ending a 27-game winning streak of the defending champion Miami Heat and a 13-game winning streak of the New York Knicks in order to become the second team in league history to snap two winning streaks of 13 or more games. In the playoffs, after defeating the Brooklyn Nets in a tough seven-game first round series, the Bulls were eliminated in the next round by the Heat in five games. Miami would eventually win their second consecutive title after defeating the San Antonio Spurs in seven games.

== Key dates ==
- June 28 – The 2012 NBA draft took place in Newark, New Jersey, at the Prudential Center.

== Draft picks ==
Round	Pick	Player	Position	Nationality	College/Club Team
1	29	Marquis Teague	PG	United States	Kentucky

== Future draft picks ==
=== Credits ===
2013 first round draft pick from Charlotte

Charlotte's own 2013 1st round draft pick to Chicago (top-12 protected in the 2013 Draft, top-10 protected in 2014, top-8 protected in 2015 and unprotected in the 2016 Draft.) [Charlotte – Chicago, 2/18/2010].

=== Debits ===
No picks owed

== Roster ==
2012–13 Chicago Bulls roster
Players

Pos.	No.	Player	Height	Weight	DOB	From
G	8	Marco Belinelli	6 ft 5 in (1.96 m)	195 lb (88 kg)	1986-03-25	Italy
F	5	Carlos Boozer	6 ft 9 in (2.06 m)	266 lb (121 kg)	1981-11-20	Duke
G/F	21	Jimmy Butler	6 ft 7 in (2.01 m)	220 lb (100 kg)	1989-09-14	Marquette
G	14	Daequan Cook	6 ft 5 in (1.96 m)	205 lb (93 kg)	1987-04-28	Ohio State
F	9	Luol Deng	6 ft 9 in (2.06 m)	220 lb (100 kg)	1985-04-16	Duke
F	22	Taj Gibson	6 ft 9 in (2.06 m)	225 lb (102 kg)	1985-06-24	USC
G	32	Richard Hamilton	6 ft 7 in (2.01 m)	193 lb (88 kg)	1978-02-14	Connecticut
G	12	Kirk Hinrich	6 ft 4 in (1.93 m)	190 lb (86 kg)	1981-01-02	Kansas
C	48	Nazr Mohammed	6 ft 10 in (2.08 m)	250 lb (113 kg)	1977-09-05	Kentucky
C	13	Joakim Noah	6 ft 11 in (2.11 m)	232 lb (105 kg)	1985-02-25	Florida
F	77	Vladimir Radmanović	6 ft 10 in (2.08 m)	235 lb (107 kg)	1980-11-19	Serbia
G	2	Nate Robinson	5 ft 9 in (1.75 m)	180 lb (82 kg)	1984-05-31	Washington
G	1	Derrick Rose	6 ft 3 in (1.91 m)	190 lb (86 kg)	1988-10-04	Memphis
G	25	Marquis Teague	6 ft 2 in (1.88 m)	190 lb (86 kg)	1993-02-28	Kentucky
F	3	Malcolm Thomas	6 ft 9 in (2.06 m)	225 lb (102 kg)	1988-11-08	San Diego State

Coaches
Head coach
- Tom Thibodeau
Assistant(s)
- Ron Adams
- Rick Brunson
- Andy Greer
- Adrian Griffin
- Ed Pinckney
- Mike Wilhelm
- Fred Tedeschi (trainer)

Legend
- (DP) Unsigned draft pick
- (FA) Free agent
- (S) Suspended
- Injured

Roster
Updated: March 19, 2013

== Pre-season ==
2012 pre-season game log
Pre-season: 5–2 (home: 5–1; road: 0–1)

Game	Date	Team	Score	High points	High rebounds	High assists	Location Attendance	Record
1	October 9	Memphis	W 92–88	Luol Deng (18)	Nazr Mohammed (12)	Kirk Hinrich (7)	United Center; 21,003	1–0
2	October 12	Cleveland	L 83–86	Kirk Hinrich (14)	Nazr Mohammed (11)	Kirk Hinrich (8)	Assembly Hall; 8,678	1–1
3	October 13	@ Minnesota	L 75–82	Kirk Hinrich (15)	Joakim Noah (13)	Jimmy Butler, Kirk Hinrich (3)	Target Center; 12,251	1–2
4	October 16	Milwaukee	W 100–94	Nate Robinson (24)	Joakim Noah (12)	Nate Robinson (13)	United Center; 21,073	2–2
5	October 19	Minnesota	W 92–81	Carlos Boozer (24)	Joakim Noah (12)	Kirk Hinrich (8)	United Center; 21,418	3–2
6	October 23	Oklahoma City	W 94–89	Carlos Boozer (24)	Carlos Boozer (12)	Carlos Boozer (5)	United Center; 21,532	4–2
7	October 26	Indiana	W 97–90	Nate Robinson (21)	Taj Gibson (11)	Nate Robinson (8)	Edmund P. Joyce Center; 9,149	5–2

2012–13 season schedule

== Standings ==
Central Division	W	L	PCT	GB	Home	Road	Div	GP
y-Indiana Pacers	49	32	.605	–	30–11	19–21	13–3	81†
x-Chicago Bulls	45	37	.549	4.5	24–17	21–20	9–7	82
x-Milwaukee Bucks	38	44	.463	11.5	21–20	17–24	7–9	82
Detroit Pistons	29	53	.354	20.5	18–23	11–30	8–8	82
Cleveland Cavaliers	24	58	.293	25.5	14–27	10–31	3–13	82

Eastern Conference
#	Team	W	L	PCT	GB	GP
1	z-Miami Heat *	66	16	.805	–	82
2	y-New York Knicks *	54	28	.659	12.0	82
3	y-Indiana Pacers *	49	32	.605	16.5	81
4	x-Brooklyn Nets	49	33	.598	17.0	82
5	x-Chicago Bulls	45	37	.549	21.0	82
6	x-Atlanta Hawks	44	38	.537	22.0	82
7	x-Boston Celtics	41	40	.506	24.5	81
8	x-Milwaukee Bucks	38	44	.463	28.0	82
9	Philadelphia 76ers	34	48	.415	32.0	82
10	Toronto Raptors	34	48	.415	32.0	82
11	Washington Wizards	29	53	.354	37.0	82
12	Detroit Pistons	29	53	.354	37.0	82
13	Cleveland Cavaliers	24	58	.293	42.0	82
14	Charlotte Bobcats	21	61	.256	45.0	82
15	Orlando Magic	20	62	.244	46.0	82

== Game log ==
2012–13 game log
Total: 45–37 (home: 24–17 Road: 21–20)
October: 1–0 (home: 1–0; road: 0–0)

Game	Date	Team	Score	High points	High rebounds	High assists	Location Attendance	Record
1	October 31	Sacramento	W 93–87	Joakim Noah (23)	Luol Deng (12)	Kirk Hinrich (7)	United Center; 21,313	1–0

November : 6–7 (home: 3–4; road: 3–3)

Game	Date	Team	Score	High points	High rebounds	High assists	Location Attendance	Record
2	November 2	@ Cleveland	W 115–86	Boozer & Hamilton (19)	Carlos Boozer (7)	Nate Robinson (12)	Quicken Loans Arena; 20,562	2–0
3	November 3	New Orleans	L 82–89	Luol Deng (19)	Joakim Noah (11)	Deng & Hinrich (4)	United Center; 21,758	2–1
4	November 6	Orlando	W 99–93	Luol Deng (23)	Joakim Noah (9)	Nate Robinson (6)	United Center; 21,216	3–1
5	November 8	Oklahoma City	L 91–97	Luol Deng (27)	Joakim Noah (13)	Joakim Noah (6)	United Center; 21,737	3–2
6	November 10	Minnesota	W 87–80	Nate Robinson (18)	Carlos Boozer (9)	Boozer & Deng (4)	United Center; 21,974	4–2
7	November 12	Boston	L 95–101	Luol Deng (26)	Deng & Noah (11)	Nate Robinson (7)	United Center; 21,712	4–3
8	November 14	@ Phoenix	W 112–106	Carlos Boozer (28)	Carlos Boozer (14)	Kirk Hinrich (7)	US Airways Center; 15,305	5–3
9	November 17	@ L.A. Clippers	L 80–101	Carlos Boozer (22)	Carlos Boozer (12)	Kirk Hinrich (10)	Staples Center; 19,060	5–4
10	November 18	@ Portland	L 94–102	Nate Robinson (18)	Joakim Noah (15)	Joakim Noah (8)	Rose Garden; 20,242	5–5
11	November 21	@ Houston	L 89–93	Nate Robinson (21)	Carlos Boozer (15)	Kirk Hinrich (6)	Toyota Center; 15,950	5–6
12	November 24	@ Milwaukee	W 93–86	Boozer & Hamilton (22)	Carlos Boozer (19)	Joakim Noah (5)	Bradley Center; 14,812	6–6
13	November 26	Milwaukee	L 92–93	Richard Hamilton (30)	Carlos Boozer (11)	Kirk Hinrich (6)	United Center; 21,485	6–7
14	November 28	Dallas	W 101–78	Luol Deng (22)	Joakim Noah (10)	Nate Robinson (6)	United Center; 21,575	7–7

December : 9–6 (home: 5–4; road: 4–2)

Game	Date	Team	Score	High points	High rebounds	High assists	Location Attendance	Record
15	December 1	Philadelphia	W 93–88	Luol Deng (25)	Joakim Noah (13)	Deng & Noah (7)	United Center; 21,607	8–7
16	December 4	Indiana	L 76–80	Nate Robinson (19)	Carlos Boozer (10)	Kirk Hinrich (6)	United Center; 21,152	8–8
17	December 5	@ Cleveland	W 95–85	Marco Belinelli (23)	Joakim Noah (15)	Kirk Hinrich (8)	Quicken Loans Arena; 17,893	9–8
18	December 7	@ Detroit	W 108–104	Joakim Noah (30)	Joakim Noah (23)	Deng, Hinrich & Noah (6)	The Palace of Auburn Hills; 17,142	10–8
19	December 8	New York	W 93–85	Belinelli & Deng (22)	Joakim Noah (11)	Nate Robinson (8)	United Center; 21,852	11–8
20	December 11	L.A. Clippers	L 89–94	Carlos Boozer (24)	Carlos Boozer (13)	Joakim Noah (6)	United Center; 21,571	11–9
21	December 12	@ Philadelphia	W 96–89	Joakim Noah (21)	Luol Deng (12)	Joakim Noah (5)	Wells Fargo Center; 15,738	12–9
22	December 15	Brooklyn	W 83–82	Marco Belinelli (19)	Joakim Noah (10)	Noah & Robinson (5)	United Center; 21,866	13–9
23	December 17	@ Memphis	L 71–80	Carlos Boozer (16)	Carlos Boozer (13)	Kirk Hinrich (5)	FedExForum; 17,305	13–10
24	December 18	Boston	W 100–89	Boozer & Deng (21)	Joakim Noah (13)	Joakim Noah (10)	United Center; 21,825	14–10
25	December 21	@ New York	W 110–106	Luol Deng (29)	Luol Deng (13)	Kirk Hinrich (8)	Madison Square Garden; 19,033	15–10
26	December 22	@ Atlanta	L 75–92	Luol Deng (11)	Joakim Noah (9)	Nate Robinson (5)	Philips Arena; 17,782	15–11
27	December 25	Houston	L 97–120	Nate Robinson (27)	Joakim Noah (9)	Hinrich & Noah (4)	United Center; 22,310	15–12
PPD	December 26	@ Indiana					Bankers Life Fieldhouse	
28	December 29	Washington	W 87–77	Marco Belinelli (17)	Carlos Boozer (12)	Kirk Hinrich (7)	United Center; 22,447	16–12
29	December 31	Charlotte	L 81–91	Luol Deng (20)	Carlos Boozer (14)	Nate Robinson (7)	United Center; 21,986	16–13

January : 12–4 (home: 6–3; road: 6–1)

Game	Date	Team	Score	High points	High rebounds	High assists	Location Attendance	Record
30	January 2	@ Orlando	W 96–94	Carlos Boozer (31)	Boozer & Gibson (11)	Richard Hamilton (9)	Amway Center; 18,846	17–13
31	January 4	@ Miami	W 96–89	Carlos Boozer (27)	Boozer & Noah (12)	Kirk Hinrich (8)	American Airlines Arena; 20,138	18–13
32	January 7	Cleveland	W 118–92	Carlos Boozer (24)	Boozer & Noah (11)	Deng & Robinson (7)	United Center; 21,355	19–13
33	January 9	Milwaukee	L 96–104	Carlos Boozer (22)	Joakim Noah (12)	Nate Robinson (6)	United Center; 21,570	19–14
34	January 11	@ New York	W 108–101	Luol Deng (33)	Joakim Noah (8)	Kirk Hinrich (7)	Madison Square Garden; 19,033	20–14
35	January 12	Phoenix	L 81–97	Carlos Boozer (15)	Joakim Noah (13)	Nate Robinson (6)	United Center; 21,874	20–15
36	January 14	Atlanta	W 97–58	Carlos Boozer (20)	Joakim Noah (16)	Boozer, Hinrich, & Robinson (3)	United Center; 21,430	21–15
37	January 16	@ Toronto	W 107–105 (OT)	Carlos Boozer (36)	Joakim Noah (14)	Luol Deng (7)	Air Canada Centre; 18,674	22–15
38	January 18	@ Boston	W 100–99 (OT)	Richard Hamilton (20)	Carlos Boozer (20)	Kirk Hinrich (5)	TD Garden; 18,624	23–15
39	January 19	Memphis	L 82–85 (OT)	Jimmy Butler (18)	Carlos Boozer (14)	Nate Robinson (5)	United Center; 22,124	23–16
40	January 21	L.A. Lakers	W 95–83	Kirk Hinrich (22)	Joakim Noah (13)	Kirk Hinrich (8)	United Center; 22,550	24–16
41	January 23	Detroit	W 85–82	Jimmy Butler (18)	Joakim Noah (18)	Nate Robinson (7)	United Center; 21,567	25–16
42	January 25	Golden State	W 103–87	Kirk Hinrich (25)	Joakim Noah (16)	Richard Hamilton (5)	United Center; 21,756	26–16
43	January 26	@ Washington	L 73–86	Nate Robinson (19)	Joakim Noah (17)	Joakim Noah (10)	Verizon Center; 20,308	26–17
44	January 28	Charlotte	W 93–85	Jimmy Butler (19)	Joakim Noah (18)	Joakim Noah (7)	United Center; 21,308	27–17
45	January 30	@ Milwaukee	W 104–88	Nate Robinson (24)	Luol Deng (13)	Kirk Hinrich (8)	Bradley Center; 17,640	28–17

February : 5–8 (home: 1–3; road: 4–5)

Game	Date	Team	Score	High points	High rebounds	High assists	Location Attendance	Record
46	February 1	@ Brooklyn	L 89–93	Belinelli & Deng (18)	Taj Gibson (9)	Nate Robinson (11)	Barclays Center; 17,732	28–18
47	February 2	@ Atlanta	W 93–76	Luol Deng (25)	Taj Gibson (19)	Nate Robinson (8)	Philips Arena; 17,898	29–18
48	February 4	@ Indiana	L 101–111	Marco Belinelli (24)	Taj Gibson (11)	Nate Robinson (9)	Bankers Life Fieldhouse; 18,165	29–19
49	February 7	@ Denver	L 96–128	Daequan Cook (19)	Luol Deng (8)	Nate Robinson (6)	Pepsi Center; 19,325	29–20
50	February 8	@ Utah	W 93–89	Carlos Boozer (19)	Joakim Noah (11)	Nate Robinson (9)	EnergySolutions Arena; 19,911	30–20
51	February 11	San Antonio	L 89–103	Nate Robinson (20)	Joakim Noah (15)	Nate Robinson (7)	United Center; 21,955	30–21
52	February 13	@ Boston	L 69–71	Marco Belinelli (12)	Joakim Noah (16)	Nate Robinson (6)	TD Garden; 18,624	30–22
All-Star Break
53	February 19	@ New Orleans	W 96–87	Luol Deng (20)	Joakim Noah (17)	Kirk Hinrich (10)	New Orleans Arena; 13,612	31–22
54	February 21	Miami	L 67–86	Nate Robinson (14)	Carlos Boozer (11)	Joakim Noah (8)	United Center; 22,640	31–23
55	February 22	@ Charlotte	W 105–75	Taj Gibson (17)	Carlos Boozer (10)	Joakim Noah (8)	Time Warner Cable Arena; 17,870	32–23
56	February 24	@ Oklahoma City	L 72–102	Luol Deng (13)	Joakim Noah (9)	Nate Robinson (5)	Chesapeake Energy Arena; 18,203	32–24
57	February 26	Cleveland	L 98–101	Carlos Boozer (27)	Joakim Noah (9)	Kirk Hinrich (11)	United Center; 21,501	32–25
58	February 28	Philadelphia	W 93–82	Joakim Noah (23)	Joakim Noah (21)	Kirk Hinrich (6)	United Center; 21,576	33–25

March : 7–7 (home: 5–2; road: 2–5)

Game	Date	Team	Score	High points	High rebounds	High assists	Location Attendance	Record
59	March 2	Brooklyn	W 96–85	Joakim Noah (21)	Joakim Noah (10)	Joakim Noah (5)	United Center; 22,414	34–25
60	March 3	@ Indiana	L 92–97	Belinelli & Butler (20)	Joakim Noah (10)	Nate Robinson (6)	Bankers Life Fieldhouse; 17,533	34–26
61	March 6	@ San Antonio	L 83–101	Marco Belinelli (21)	Joakim Noah (13)	Marco Belinelli (7)	AT&T Center; 18,581	34–27
62	March 8	Utah	W 89–88	Belinelli & Boozer (22)	Joakim Noah (13)	Nate Robinson (7)	United Center; 21,842	35–27
63	March 10	@ L.A. Lakers	L 81–90	Nate Robinson (19)	Joakim Noah (17)	Nate Robinson (8)	Staples Center; 18,997	35–28
64	March 13	@ Sacramento	L 79–121	Carlos Boozer (21)	Joakim Noah (9)	Carlos Boozer (4)	Power Balance Pavilion; 14,426	35–29
65	March 15	@ Golden State	W 113–95	Luol Deng (23)	Joakim Noah (13)	Nate Robinson (7)	Oracle Arena; 19,596	36–29
66	March 18	Denver	L 118–119 (OT)	Nate Robinson (34)	Joakim Noah (12)	Joakim Noah (6)	United Center; 22,138	36–30
67	March 21	Portland	L 89–99	Joakim Noah (18)	Carlos Boozer (11)	Nate Robinson (9)	United Center; 21,946	36–31
68	March 23	Indiana	W 87–84	Luol Deng (20)	Carlos Boozer (10)	Kirk Hinrich (5)	United Center; 22,494	37–31
69	March 24	@ Minnesota	W 104–97	Nate Robinson (22)	Carlos Boozer (12)	Nate Robinson (10)	Target Center; 17,330	38–31
70	March 27	Miami	W 101–97	Luol Deng (28)	Carlos Boozer (17)	Kirk Hinrich (6)	United Center; 23,014	39–31
71	March 30	@ Dallas	L 98–100	Luol Deng (25)	Carlos Boozer (11)	Kirk Hinrich (6)	American Airlines Center; 20,502	39–32
72	March 31	Detroit	W 95–94	Luol Deng (28)	Luol Deng (9)	Kirk Hinrich (6)	United Center; 21,864	40–32

April : 5–5 (home: 3–1; road: 2–4)

Game	Date	Team	Score	High points	High rebounds	High assists	Location Attendance	Record
73	April 2	@ Washington	L 86–90	Carlos Boozer (19)	Boozer & Mohammed (12)	Carlos Boozer (5)	Verizon Center; 17,319	40–33
74	April 4	@ Brooklyn	W 92–90	Carlos Boozer (29)	Carlos Boozer (18)	Kirk Hinrich (6)	Barclays Center; 17,732	41–33
75	April 5	Orlando	W 87–86	Deng & Robinson (19)	Nazr Mohammed (11)	Nate Robinson (5)	United Center; 22,268	42–33
76	April 7	@ Detroit	L 85–99	Carlos Boozer (21)	Carlos Boozer (10)	Kirk Hinrich (8)	The Palace of Auburn Hills; 19,577	42–34
77	April 9	Toronto	L 98–101	Jimmy Butler (28)	Carlos Boozer (11)	Carlos Boozer (8)	United Center; 21,487	42–35
78	April 11	New York	W 118–111 (OT)	Nate Robinson (35)	Carlos Boozer (15)	Richard Hamilton (8)	United Center; 22,464	43–35
79	April 12	@ Toronto	L 88–97	Carlos Boozer (19)	Nazr Mohammed (13)	Luol Deng (8)	Air Canada Centre; 19,800	43–36
80	April 14	@ Miami	L 93–105	Luol Deng (19)	Carlos Boozer (20)	Hinrich, Boozer, Belinelli & Deng (3)	American Airlines Arena; 19,810	43–37
81	April 15	@ Orlando	W 102–84	Carlos Boozer (22)	Jimmy Butler (10)	Luol Deng (8)	Amway Center; 17,297	44–37
82	April 17	Washington	W 95–92	Carlos Boozer (19)	Carlos Boozer (15)	Hinrich & Deng (5)	United Center; 22,421	45–37

2012–13 season schedule

== Playoffs ==
=== Game log ===
2013 playoff game log
First Round: 4–3 (home: 2–1; road: 2–2)

Game	Date	Team	Score	High points	High rebounds	High assists	Location Attendance	Series
1	April 20	@ Brooklyn	L 89–106	Carlos Boozer (25)	Carlos Boozer (8)	Carlos Boozer (4)	Barclays Center; 17,732	0–1
2	April 22	@ Brooklyn	W 90–82	Luol Deng (15)	Carlos Boozer (12)	Kirk Hinrich (5)	Barclays Center; 17,732	1–1
3	April 25	Brooklyn	W 79–76	Carlos Boozer (22)	Carlos Boozer (16)	Boozer & Deng (3)	United Center; 21,672	2–1
4	April 27	Brooklyn	W 142–134 (3OT)	Nate Robinson (34)	Joakim Noah (13)	Kirk Hinrich (14)	United Center; 21,758	3–1
5	April 29	@ Brooklyn	L 91–110	Nate Robinson (20)	Carlos Boozer (10)	Nate Robinson (8)	Barclays Center; 17,732	3–2
6	May 2	Brooklyn	L 92–95	Marco Belinelli (22)	Joakim Noah (15)	Marco Belinelli (7)	United Center; 21,810	3–3
7	May 4	@ Brooklyn	W 99–93	Noah & Belinelli (24)	Joakim Noah (14)	Robinson & Butler (4)	Barclays Center; 17,732	4–3

Conference Semifinals: 1–4 (home: 0–2; road: 1–2)

Game	Date	Team	Score	High points	High rebounds	High assists	Location Attendance	Series
1	May 6	@ Miami	W 93–86	Nate Robinson (27)	Jimmy Butler (14)	Nate Robinson (9)	American Airlines Arena; 19,685	1–0
2	May 8	@ Miami	L 78–115	Marco Belinelli (13)	Joakim Noah (6)	Marco Belinelli (6)	American Airlines Arena; 19,817	1–1
3	May 10	Miami	L 94–104	Carlos Boozer (21)	Joakim Noah (11)	Nate Robinson (7)	United Center; 22,675	1–2
4	May 13	Miami	L 65–88	Carlos Boozer (14)	Carlos Boozer (11)	Nate Robinson (7)	United Center; 21,990	1–3
5	May 15	@ Miami	L 91–94	Carlos Boozer (26)	Carlos Boozer (14)	Nate Robinson (6)	American Airlines Arena; 20,250	1–4

2013 playoff schedule

== Player statistics ==
Legend
GP	Games played	GS	Games started	MPG	Minutes per game
FG%	Field-goal percentage	3P%	3-point field-goal percentage	FT%	Free-throw percentage
RPG	Rebounds per game	APG	Assists per game	SPG	Steals per game
BPG	Blocks per game	PPG	Points per game

=== Season ===
Player	GP	GS	MPG	FG%	3P%	FT%	RPG	APG	SPG	BPG	PPG
Louis Amundson	1	0	2.0	.000	.000	.000	1.0	0.0	0.0	0.0	0.0
Marco Belinelli	73	27	25.8	.395	.357	.839	1.9	2.0	0.60	0.08	9.6
Carlos Boozer	79	79	32.2	.477	.000	.731	9.8	2.3	0.84	0.35	16.2
Jimmy Butler	82	20	26.0	.467	.381	.803	4.0	1.4	0.95	0.38	8.5
Daequan Cook	33	0	8.4	.278	.246	.778	1.3	0.3	0.06	0.15	2.5
Luol Deng	75	75	38.7	.426	.322	.816	6.3	3.0	1.08	0.43	16.5
Taj Gibson	65	5	22.4	.485	.000	.679	5.3	0.9	0.42	1.38	8.0
Richard Hamilton	50	45	21.8	.429	.308	.857	1.7	2.4	0.48	0.10	9.8
Kirk Hinrich	60	60	29.4	.377	.390	.714	2.6	5.2	1.05	0.42	7.7
Nazr Mohammed	63	12	11.0	.367	.000	.723	3.1	0.4	0.33	0.51	2.6
Joakim Noah	66	64	36.8	.481	.000	.751	11.1	4.0	1.18	2.14	11.9
Vladimir Radmanovic	25	0	5.8	.302	.185	.667	1.1	0.3	0.32	0.16	1.3
Nate Robinson	82	23	25.4	.433	.405	.799	2.2	4.4	1.04	0.12	13.1
Marquis Teague	48	0	8.2	.381	.174	.563	0.9	1.3	0.19	0.15	2.1
Malcolm Thomas	7	0	5.1	.556	.000	.500	1.6	0.3	0.29	0.14	1.7

== Awards, records and milestones ==
=== Week/Month ===
Eastern Conference Player of the Week
Week	Winner	Ref.
Jan. 14 – Jan. 20	Carlos Boozer(1/1)	
Jan. 28 – Feb. 3	Nate Robinson (1/1)	

Eastern Conference Coach of the Month
Month	Winner	Ref.
January	Tom Thibodeau	

=== All-Star ===
- Luol Deng was named an All-Star reserve by coaches for the second straight year.
- Joakim Noah made his first All-Star appearance at the 2013 NBA All-Star Game held in Houston.

== Transactions ==
=== Trades ===
July 16, 2012	To Chicago Bulls Cash considerations	To Atlanta Hawks Kyle Korver

=== Free agents ===
Additions
Player	Date signed	Former team
Vladimir Radmanović	July 19	Atlanta Hawks
Kirk Hinrich	July 23	Atlanta Hawks
Marco Belinelli	July 24	New Orleans Hornets
Nazr Mohammed	July 27	Oklahoma City Thunder
Nate Robinson	August 1	Golden State Warriors
Daequan Cook	January 4	Houston Rockets
Malcolm Thomas	March 19	Golden State Warriors

Subtractions
Player	Reason Left	New team
Ronnie Brewer	Waived	New York Knicks
John Lucas III	Free Agency	Toronto Raptors
C.J. Watson	Waived	Brooklyn Nets
Ömer Aşık	Free Agency	Houston Rockets
