= 2012–13 Brooklyn Nets season =

Season of National Basketball Association team the Brooklyn Nets

- Head coach: Avery Johnson (fired); P. J. Carlesimo (interim)
- Owners: Mikhail Prokhorov
- Arena: Barclays Center

Results
- Record: 49–33 (.598)
- Place: Division: 2nd (Atlantic); Conference: 4th (Eastern)
- Playoff finish: First round (lost to Bulls 3–4)
- Stats at Basketball Reference

Local media
- Television: YES Network, WWOR
- Radio: WFAN

The 2012–13 Brooklyn Nets season was the franchise's 46th season, its 37th in the National Basketball Association (NBA), and its first season following its relocation from New Jersey to Brooklyn, New York, after the 2011–12 season. The Nets finished with a record of 49–33, their first winning season since 2005–06, the 2nd best record in the Atlantic Division and the 4th best in the Eastern Conference. When considering the Nets' time in the NBA only, the 49–33 record is also tied for the second best in franchise history at the time, and the 23–18 record on the road was the first winning record on the road in franchise history.

In the 2013 NBA Playoffs, the Nets played an injury-plagued Chicago Bulls in the first round to seven games, but lost the decisive game at home 93–99.

== Key dates ==
- June 28: The 2012 NBA draft took place at the Prudential Center in Newark, New Jersey.
- November 1: The Nets were scheduled to begin the 2012–13 campaign in the newly built Barclays Center in Brooklyn, New York against the New York Knicks. However, due to damage caused by Hurricane Sandy all across New York City, the game was postponed.
- November 3: The Nets' 2012–13 campaign in the newly built Barclays Center in Brooklyn, New York home opener for the Nets started out against the Toronto Raptors.
- December 27: The Nets fire head coach Avery Johnson after losing 10 of 13 games. P. J. Carlesimo is named interim head coach.

== Draft picks ==
Round	Pick	Player	Position	Nationality	College/Team
2	57	İlkan Karaman	PF	Turkey	Pınar Karşıyaka (Turkey)

The team entered the draft for the first time as the Brooklyn Nets, holding one second-round selection acquired when the franchise was still the New Jersey Nets from the Miami Heat in 2009. Their original first-round selection was traded to the Portland Trail Blazers in the February 2012 Gerald Wallace trade and conveyed after falling outside its top-3 protection following the draft lottery, while their original second-round selection was traded to the Golden State Warriors in 2011.

== Future draft picks ==
=== Credits ===
No picks owing

=== Debits ===
2013 second-round draft pick to Minnesota

Brooklyn's own 2013 2nd-round pick to Minnesota via Minnesota and New Orleans. [Brooklyn-Minnesota, 6/24/2011 and then Minnesota-New Orleans 7/13/2012 and then Minnesota-New Orleans-Phoenix, 7/27/2012]

2014 second-round draft pick to Boston

Brooklyn's own 2014 2nd-round pick to Boston. (Boston – Brooklyn, 6/23/2011)

2015 second-round draft pick to Utah

Brooklyn's own 2015 2nd-round pick to Utah (Brooklyn – Utah, 12/22/2011)

2016 second-round draft pick to L.A. Clippers

The L.A. Clippers have the right to swap their own 2016 2nd-round pick with Brooklyn's 2016 2nd-round pick provided the L.A. Clippers' 2nd-round pick is 31–55. If The L.A. Clippers pick is 56–60, Brooklyn's obligations to the L.A. Clippers shall be extinguished. (Brooklyn-L.A. Clippers, 7/11/2012)

2017 second-round draft pick to Atlanta

Brooklyn's own 2017 2nd-round pick to Atlanta. (Atlanta-Brooklyn, 7/11/2012)

== Roster ==
2012–13 Brooklyn Nets roster
Players

Pos.	No.	Player	Height	Weight	DOB	From
F/C	0	Andray Blatche	6 ft 11 in (2.11 m)	260 lb (118 kg)	1986-08-22	South Kent
G	10	Keith Bogans	6 ft 5 in (1.96 m)	215 lb (98 kg)	1980-05-12	Kentucky
G/F	9	MarShon Brooks	6 ft 5 in (1.96 m)	200 lb (91 kg)	1989-01-26	Providence
F	30	Reggie Evans	6 ft 8 in (2.03 m)	245 lb (111 kg)	1980-05-18	Iowa
F	43	Kris Humphries	6 ft 9 in (2.06 m)	235 lb (107 kg)	1985-02-06	Minnesota
G/F	7	Joe Johnson	6 ft 7 in (2.01 m)	240 lb (109 kg)	1981-06-29	Arkansas
F	24	Kris Joseph	6 ft 7 in (2.01 m)	210 lb (95 kg)	1988-12-27	Syracuse
C	11	Brook Lopez	7 ft 0 in (2.13 m)	265 lb (120 kg)	1988-04-01	Stanford
PF	20	Tornike Shengelia	6 ft 9 in (2.06 m)	228 lb (103 kg)	1991-10-05	Georgia (country)
G/F	42	Jerry Stackhouse	6 ft 6 in (1.98 m)	218 lb (99 kg)	1974-11-05	North Carolina
G	41	Tyshawn Taylor	6 ft 3 in (1.91 m)	185 lb (84 kg)	1990-04-12	Kansas
PF	33	Mirza Teletović	6 ft 9 in (2.06 m)	254 lb (115 kg)	1985-09-17	Bosnia and Herzegovina
F	45	Gerald Wallace	6 ft 7 in (2.01 m)	220 lb (100 kg)	1982-07-03	Alabama
G	1	C. J. Watson	6 ft 2 in (1.88 m)	175 lb (79 kg)	1984-04-17	Tennessee
G	8	Deron Williams	6 ft 3 in (1.91 m)	209 lb (95 kg)	1984-06-26	Illinois

Coaches
Head coach
- Avery Johnson
- P. J. Carlesimo (interim)
Assistant(s)
- Mario Elie
- Doug Overton
- Popeye Jones
- Patrick Spurgin

Legend
- (DP) Unsigned draft pick
- (FA) Free agent
- (S) Suspended
- (DL) On assignment to D-League affiliate
- Injured

Roster
Updated: July 14, 2012

== Pre-season ==
2012 pre-season game log
Pre-season: 3–3 (home: 1–3; road: 2–0)

Game	Date	Team	Score	High points	High rebounds	High assists	Location Attendance	Record
1	October 13	@ Philadelphia	W 108–105 (OT)	Lopez & Watson (19)	Brook Lopez (9)	Deron Williams (6)	Boardwalk Hall; 6,887	1–0
2	October 15	Washington	W 98–88	Brook Lopez (18)	Brook Lopez (11)	Deron Williams (9)	Barclays Center; 14,219	2–0
3	October 16	@ Boston	W 97–96	Andray Blatche (23)	Reggie Evans (10)	Tyshawn Taylor (5)	TD Garden; 18,624	3–0
4	October 18	Boston	L 85–115	Brook Lopez (14)	Andray Blatche (9)	Deron Williams (6)	Barclays Center; 14,192	3–1
5	October 19	Philadelphia	L 96–106	Brook Lopez (23)	Brook Lopez (9)	Bogans & Williams (4)	Barclays Center; 13,270	3–2
6	October 24	New York	L 95–97 (OT)	Deron Williams (22)	Andray Blatche (10)	Three players (2)	Nassau Coliseum; 15,957	3–3

2012–13 season schedule

== Regular season ==
=== Standings ===
Atlantic Division	W	L	PCT	GB	Home	Road	Div	GP
y-New York Knicks	54	28	.659	–	31–10	23–18	10–6	82
x-Brooklyn Nets	49	33	.598	5	26–15	23–18	11–5	82
x-Boston Celtics	41	40	.506	12.5	27–13	14–27	7–9	81†
Philadelphia 76ers	34	48	.415	20	23–18	11–30	7–9	82
Toronto Raptors	34	48	.415	20	21–20	13–28	5–11	82

Eastern Conference
#	Team	W	L	PCT	GB	GP
1	z-Miami Heat *	66	16	.805	–	82
2	y-New York Knicks *	54	28	.659	12.0	82
3	y-Indiana Pacers *	49	32	.605	16.5	81
4	x-Brooklyn Nets	49	33	.598	17.0	82
5	x-Chicago Bulls	45	37	.549	21.0	82
6	x-Atlanta Hawks	44	38	.537	22.0	82
7	x-Boston Celtics	41	40	.506	24.5	81
8	x-Milwaukee Bucks	38	44	.463	28.0	82
9	Philadelphia 76ers	34	48	.415	32.0	82
10	Toronto Raptors	34	48	.415	32.0	82
11	Washington Wizards	29	53	.354	37.0	82
12	Detroit Pistons	29	53	.354	37.0	82
13	Cleveland Cavaliers	24	58	.293	42.0	82
14	Charlotte Bobcats	21	61	.256	45.0	82
15	Orlando Magic	20	62	.244	46.0	82

=== Game log ===
2012–13 game log
Total: 49–33 (home: 26–15; road: 23–18)
November: 11–4 (home: 7–1; road: 4–3)

Game	Date	Team	Score	High points	High rebounds	High assists	Location Attendance	Record
1	November 3	Toronto	W 107–100	Brook Lopez (27)	Reggie Evans (13)	Deron Williams (9)	Barclays Center; 17,732	1–0
2	November 5	Minnesota	L 96–107	Joe Johnson (19)	Brook Lopez (9)	Deron Williams (14)	Barclays Center; 14,017	1–1
3	November 7	@ Miami	L 73–103	Deron Williams (14)	Kris Humphries (11)	Deron Williams (3)	American Airlines Arena; 19,627	1–2
4	November 9	@ Orlando	W 107–68	Andray Blatche (15)	Brook Lopez (10)	Three players (4)	Amway Center; 17,532	2–2
5	November 11	Orlando	W 82–74	Brook Lopez (20)	Kris Humphries (21)	Deron Williams (7)	Barclays Center; 16,523	3–2
6	November 13	Cleveland	W 114–101	Deron Williams (26)	Reggie Evans (8)	Deron Williams (10)	Barclays Center; 17,032	4–2
7	November 15	Boston	W 102–97	Lopez & Williams (24)	Kris Humphries (13)	Deron Williams (8)	Barclays Center; 17,732	5–2
8	November 18	@ Sacramento	W 99–90	Andray Blatche (22)	Kris Humphries (10)	Deron Williams (10)	Sleep Train Arena; 11,965	6–2
9	November 20	@ L. A. Lakers	L 90–95	Brook Lopez (23)	Reggie Evans (11)	Deron Williams (10)	Staples Center; 18,997	6–3
10	November 21	@ Golden State	L 93–102	Brook Lopez (22)	Andray Blatche (7)	Deron Williams (8)	Oracle Arena; 18,374	6–4
11	November 23	L. A. Clippers	W 86–76	Brook Lopez (26)	Reggie Evans (12)	Deron Williams (8)	Barclays Center; 17,732	7–4
12	November 25	Portland	W 98–85	Joe Johnson (21)	Reggie Evans (14)	Deron Williams (12)	Barclays Center; 16,542	8–4
13	November 26	New York	W 96–89 (OT)	Brook Lopez (22)	Reggie Evans (14)	Deron Williams (14)	Barclays Center; 17,732	9–4
14	November 28	@ Boston	W 95–83	Joe Johnson (18)	Andray Blatche (13)	Deron Williams (7)	TD Garden; 18,624	10–4
15	November 30	@ Orlando	W 98–86	Joe Johnson (22)	Reggie Evans (10)	Deron Williams (7)	Amway Center; 17,103	11–4

December : 5–11 (home: 4–6; road: 1–5)

Game	Date	Team	Score	High points	High rebounds	High assists	Location Attendance	Record
16	December 1	@ Miami	L 89–102	Andray Blatche (20)	Gerald Wallace (9)	Deron Williams (12)	American Airlines Arena; 19,961	11–5
17	December 4	Oklahoma City	L 111–117	Deron Williams (33)	Kris Humphries (12)	Deron Williams (7)	Barclays Center; 17,732	11–6
18	December 7	Golden State	L 102–109	Joe Johnson (32)	Andray Blatche (15)	Deron Williams (8)	Barclays Center; 17,732	11–7
19	December 9	Milwaukee	L 88–97	Deron Williams (18)	Gerald Wallace (16)	Deron Williams (8)	Barclays Center; 16,390	11–8
20	December 11	New York	L 97–100	Andray Blatche (23)	Reggie Evans (18)	Deron Williams (10)	Barclays Center; 17,732	11–9
21	December 12	@ Toronto	W 94–88	Joe Johnson (23)	Reggie Evans (11)	Johnson & Williams (4)	Air Canada Centre; 18,847	12–9
22	December 14	Detroit	W 107–105	Joe Johnson (28)	Evans & Wallace (10)	Deron Williams (6)	Barclays Center; 15,797	13–9
23	December 15	@ Chicago	L 82–83	Deron Williams (24)	Brook Lopez (10)	Johnson & Williams (5)	United Center; 21,866	13–10
24	December 18	Utah	L 90–92	Joe Johnson (21)	Kris Humphries (11)	Deron Williams (5)	Barclays Center; 15,835	13–11
25	December 19	@ New York	L 86–100	Joe Johnson (17)	Brook Lopez (10)	Deron Williams (10)	Madison Square Garden; 19,033	13–12
26	December 23	Philadelphia	W 95–92	Joe Johnson (22)	Gerald Wallace (9)	Gerald Wallace (6)	Barclays Center; 17,732	14–12
27	December 25	Boston	L 76–93	Lopez & Wallace (15)	Brook Lopez (8)	Deron Williams (6)	Barclays Center; 17,732	14–13
28	December 26	@ Milwaukee	L 93–108	Brook Lopez (21)	Gerald Wallace (12)	Gerald Wallace (8)	Bradley Center; 13,102	14–14
29	December 28	Charlotte	W 97–81	Brook Lopez (26)	Reggie Evans(13)	Gerald Wallace (6)	Barclays Center; 17,732	15–14
30	December 29	Cleveland	W 103–100	Brook Lopez (35)	Brook Lopez (11)	Deron Williams (7)	Barclays Center; 17,732	16–14
31	December 31	@ San Antonio	L 73–104	MarShon Brooks (16)	Reggie Evans(9)	Five players (2)	AT&T Center; 18,581	16–15

January : 11–4 (home: 6–1; road: 5–3)

Game	Date	Team	Score	High points	High rebounds	High assists	Location Attendance	Record
32	January 2	@ Oklahoma City	W 110–93	Joe Johnson (33)	Kris Humphries (7)	Deron Williams (13)	Chesapeake Energy Arena; 18,203	17–15
33	January 4	@ Washington	W 115–113	Brook Lopez (27)	Brook Lopez (13)	Deron Williams (10)	Verizon Center; 16,006	18–15
34	January 5	Sacramento	W 113–93	Brook Lopez (18)	Reggie Evans(12)	Deron Williams (7)	Barclays Center; 17,732	19–15
35	January 8	@ Philadelphia	W 109–89	Deron Williams (22)	Reggie Evans(23)	Three players (5)	Wells Fargo Center; 16,167	20–15
36	January 11	Phoenix	W 99–79	Joe Johnson (19)	Reggie Evans (15)	Deron Williams (6)	Barclays Center; 16,272	21–15
37	January 13	Indiana	W 97–86	Deron Williams (22)	Humphries & Lopez (9)	Deron Williams (9)	Barclays Center; 16,499	22–15
38	January 15	Toronto	W 113–106	Brook Lopez (22)	Brook Lopez (9)	Deron Williams (7)	Barclays Center; 16,236	23–15
39	January 16	@ Atlanta	L 95–109	Brook Lopez (22)	Brook Lopez (9)	Deron Williams (9)	Philips Arena; 15,029	23–16
40	January 18	Atlanta	W 94–89	Deron Williams (24)	Reggie Evans (20)	Deron Williams (7)	Barclays Center; 17,732	24–16
41	January 21	@ New York	W 88–85	Joe Johnson (25)	Kris Humphries (13)	Deron Williams (12)	Madison Square Garden; 19,033	25–16
42	January 23	@ Minnesota	W 91–83	Brook Lopez (22)	Kris Humphries (8)	Deron Williams (8)	Target Center; 15,785	26–16
43	January 25	@ Memphis	L 77–101	Brook Lopez (18)	Reggie Evans (10)	Deron Williams (6)	FedEx Forum; 16,911	26–17
44	January 26	@ Houston	L 106–119	Deron Williams (27)	Reggie Evans (8)	Deron Williams (11)	Toyota Center; 18,236	26–18
45	January 28	Orlando	W 97–77	Deron Williams (20)	Reggie Evans (10)	Deron Williams (9)	Barclays Center; 16,480	27–18
46	January 30	Miami	L 85–105	Brook Lopez (21)	Brook Lopez (7)	Joe Johnson (6)	Barclays Center; 17,732	27–19

February : 6–5 (home: 3–4; road: 3–1)

Game	Date	Team	Score	High points	High rebounds	High assists	Location Attendance	Record
47	February 1	Chicago	W 93–89	Brook Lopez (20)	Gerald Wallace (13)	Deron Williams (6)	Barclays Center; 17,732	28–19
48	February 5	L. A. Lakers	L 83–92	Brook Lopez (30)	Evans & Lopez (11)	Deron Williams (6)	Barclays Center; 17,732	28–20
49	February 6	@ Detroit	W 93–90	Brook Lopez (17)	Reggie Evans (14)	Deron Williams (9)	The Palace of Auburn Hills; 12,576	29–20
50	February 8	@ Washington	L 74–89	Deron Williams (20)	Reggie Evans (13)	Deron Williams (5)	Verizon Center; 19,614	29–21
51	February 10	San Antonio	L 86–111	Joe Johnson (19)	Evans & Lopez (9)	Brook Lopez (4)	Barclays Center; 17,014	29–22
52	February 11	@ Indiana	W 89–84	Brook Lopez (25)	Reggie Evans (22)	C. J. Watson (3)	Bankers Life Fieldhouse; 11,672	30–22
53	February 13	Denver	W 119–108	Joe Johnson (26)	Gerald Wallace (9)	Joe Johnson (9)	Barclays Center; 17,251	31–22
All-Star Break
54	February 19	Milwaukee	W 113–111	Joe Johnson (24)	Evans & Lopez (9)	Deron Williams (9)	Barclays Center; 17,334	32–22
55	February 20	@ Milwaukee	W 97–94	Deron Williams (23)	Andray Blatche (12)	Deron Williams (8)	Bradley Center; 14,563	33–22
56	February 22	Houston	L 96–106	Brook Lopez (27)	Reggie Evans (13)	Deron Williams (13)	Barclays Center; 17,732	33–23
57	February 24	Memphis	L 72–76	Deron Williams (24)	Reggie Evans (14)	C. J. Watson (4)	Barclays Center; 17,098	33–24
58	February 26	@ New Orleans	W 101–97	Deron Williams (33)	Brook Lopez (7)	Deron Williams (8)	New Orleans Arena; 12,651	34–24

March : 8–7 (home: 2–2; road: 6–5)

Game	Date	Team	Score	High points	High rebounds	High assists	Location Attendance	Record
59	March 1	Dallas	L 90–98	Deron Williams (24)	Reggie Evans (11)	Joe Johnson (6)	Barclays Center; 17,732	34–25
60	March 2	@ Chicago	L 85–96	Brook Lopez (22)	Reggie Evans (10)	Deron Williams (6)	United Center; 22,414	34–26
61	March 6	@ Charlotte	W 99–78	Joe Johnson (22)	Reggie Evans (16)	Deron Williams (8)	Time Warner Cable Arena; 13,382	35–26
62	March 8	Washington	W 95–78	Deron Williams (42)	Reggie Evans (24)	Gerald Wallace (5)	Barclays Center; 17,732	36–26
63	March 9	@ Atlanta	W 93–80	Brook Lopez (18)	Reggie Evans (9)	Deron Williams (6)	Philips Arena; 17,282	37–26
64	March 11	@ Philadelphia	L 97–106	Deron Williams (27)	Reggie Evans (11)	Deron Williams (13)	Wells Fargo Center; 16,789	37–27
65	March 12	New Orleans	W 108–98	Brook Lopez (26)	Reggie Evans (13)	Deron Williams (13)	Barclays Center; 17,732	38–27
66	March 17	Atlanta	L 93–105	Joe Johnson (18)	Reggie Evans (22)	Deron Williams (8)	Barclays Center; 17,732	38–28
67	March 18	@ Detroit	W 119–82	Deron Williams (31)	Reggie Evans (11)	Deron Williams (5)	The Palace of Auburn Hills; 16,072	39–28
68	March 20	@ Dallas	W 113–96	Brook Lopez (38)	Reggie Evans (22)	Deron Williams (6)	American Airlines Center; 19,962	40–28
69	March 23	@ L. A. Clippers	L 95–101	Brook Lopez (18)	Reggie Evans (16)	Deron Williams (9)	Staples Center; 19,506	40–29
70	March 24	@ Phoenix	W 102–100	Brook Lopez (21)	Reggie Evans (10)	Deron Williams (11)	US Airways Center; 14,800	41–29
71	March 27	@ Portland	W 111–93	Brook Lopez (28)	Reggie Evans (26)	Deron Williams (10)	Rose Garden; 20,127	42–29
72	March 29	@ Denver	L 87–109	Deron Williams (19)	Reggie Evans (16)	Marshon Brooks (5)	Pepsi Center; 19,155	42–30
73	March 30	@ Utah	L 107–116	Brook Lopez (27)	Reggie Evans (16)	Deron Williams (11)	EnergySolutions Arena; 18,008	42–31

April : 7–2 (home: 4–1; road: 3–1)

Game	Date	Team	Score	High points	High rebounds	High assists	Location Attendance	Record
74	April 3	@ Cleveland	W 113–95	Marshon Brooks (27)	Reggie Evans (18)	Deron Williams (8)	Quicken Loans Arena; 14,863	43–31
75	April 4	Chicago	L 90–92	Deron Williams (30)	Reggie Evans (13)	Deron Williams (10)	Barclays Center; 17,732	43–32
76	April 6	Charlotte	W 105–96	Deron Williams (32)	Reggie Evans (20)	Deron Williams (6)	Barclays Center; 17,444	44–32
77	April 9	Philadelphia	W 104–83	Brook Lopez (29)	Reggie Evans (24)	Deron Williams (4)	Barclays Center; 17,192	45–32
78	April 10	@ Boston	W 101–93	Deron Williams (29)	Reggie Evans (14)	Deron Williams (12)	TD Garden; 18,624	46–32
79	April 12	@ Indiana	W 117–109	Deron Williams (33)	Reggie Evans (12)	Deron Williams (14)	Bankers Life Fieldhouse; 18,165	47–32
80	April 14	@ Toronto	L 87–93	Deron Williams (30)	Reggie Evans (16)	Deron Williams (7)	Air Canada Centre; 17,617	47–33
81	April 15	Washington	W 106–101	Blatche & Humphries (20)	Andray Blatche (12)	Tyshawn Taylor (3)	Barclays Center; 16,774	48–33
82	April 17	Detroit	W 103–99	Brook Lopez (20)	Reggie Evans (11)	Deron Williams (6)	Barclays Center; 16,868	49–33

2012–13 season schedule

== Playoffs ==
=== Game log ===
2013 playoff game log
First Round: 3–4 (home: 2–2; road: 1–2)

Game	Date	Team	Score	High points	High rebounds	High assists	Location Attendance	Series
1	April 20	Chicago	W 106–89	Deron Williams (22)	Reggie Evans (13)	Deron Williams (7)	Barclays Center; 17,732	1–0
2	April 22	Chicago	L 82–90	Brook Lopez (21)	Reggie Evans (8)	Deron Williams (10)	Barclays Center; 17,732	1–1
3	April 25	@ Chicago	L 76–79	Brook Lopez (22)	Reggie Evans (12)	Deron Williams (4)	United Center; 21,672	1–2
4	April 27	@ Chicago	L 134–142 (3OT)	Deron Williams (32)	Reggie Evans (13)	Deron Williams (10)	United Center; 21,758	1–3
5	April 29	Chicago	W 110–91	Brook Lopez (28)	Reggie Evans (12)	Deron Williams (10)	Barclays Center; 17,732	2–3
6	May 2	@ Chicago	W 95–92	Three players (17)	Reggie Evans (15)	Deron Williams (11)	United Center; 21,810	3–3
7	May 4	Chicago	L 93–99	Deron Williams (24)	Reggie Evans (13)	Deron Williams (7)	Barclays Center; 17,732	3–4

2013 playoff schedule

== Player statistics ==
Legend
GP	Games played	GS	Games started	MPG	Minutes per game
FG%	Field-goal percentage	3P%	3-point field-goal percentage	FT%	Free-throw percentage
RPG	Rebounds per game	APG	Assists per game	SPG	Steals per game
BPG	Blocks per game	PPG	Points per game

=== Regular season ===
Brooklyn Nets statistics
Player	GP	GS	MPG	FG%	3P%	FT%	RPG	APG	SPG	BPG	PPG
Brook Lopez	74	74	30.4	.521	.000	.758	6.9	0.9	0.4	2.1	19.4
Deron Williams	78	78	36.4	.440	.378	.859	3.0	7.7	1.0	0.4	18.9
Joe Johnson	72	72	36.7	.423	.375	.820	3.0	3.5	0.7	0.2	16.3
Andray Blatche	82	8	19.0	.512	.136	.685	5.1	1.0	1.0	0.7	10.3
Gerald Wallace	69	68	30.1	.397	.282	.637	4.6	2.6	1.4	0.7	7.7
C.J. Watson	80	8	19.0	.418	.411	.780	1.8	2.0	0.8	0.2	6.8
Kris Humphries	65	21	18.3	.448	.000	.789	5.6	0.5	0.2	0.5	5.8
MarShon Brooks	73	2	12.5	.463	.273	.734	1.4	1.0	0.5	0.2	5.4
Jerry Stackhouse	37	0	14.7	.384	.337	.870	0.9	0.9	0.2	0.1	4.9
Reggie Evans	80	56	24.6	.479		.509	11.1	0.5	0.9	0.2	4.5
Keith Bogans	74	23	19.0	.380	.343	.647	1.6	1.0	0.4	0.1	4.2
Mirza Teletovic	53	0	9.4	.384	.343	.818	1.8	0.4	0.2	0.2	3.5
Tyshawn Taylor	38	0	5.8	.368	.462	.556	0.5	0.6	0.3	0.0	2.2
Tornike Shengelia	19	0	4.9	.435	.500	.563	1.2	0.2	0.2	0.1	1.6
Josh Childress	14	0	7.1	.286	.333	.500	1.1	0.4	0.1	0.1	1.0
Kris Joseph	4	0	7.5	.000	.000	.500	0.5	0.0	0.8	0.0	0.5
Damion James	2	0	0.0				0.5	0.0	0.0	0.0	0.0

=== Playoffs ===
Brooklyn Nets statistics
Player	GP	GS	MPG	FG%	3P%	FT%	RPG	APG	SPG	BPG	PPG
Brook Lopez	7	7	37.6	.472	1.000	.886	7.4	1.4	0.9	3.0	22.3
Deron Williams	7	7	41.7	.425	.395	.822	3.1	8.4	1.0	0.6	20.6
Joe Johnson	7	7	38.7	.417	.256	.889	3.1	2.7	1.1	0.0	14.9
Gerald Wallace	7	7	34.7	.463	.379	.550	4.0	2.4	1.1	0.7	12.0
Andray Blatche	7	0	19.7	.500		.824	4.9	1.3	0.3	0.4	10.3
C.J. Watson	7	0	23.0	.436	.267	.667	2.4	1.9	0.7	0.1	8.6
Reggie Evans	7	7	29.9	.478		.556	12.3	0.9	1.0	0.3	4.6
Kris Humphries	7	0	11.9	.452		.429	3.3	0.1	0.1	0.4	4.4
Jerry Stackhouse	4	0	7.0	.100	.000	.750	1.0	0.0	0.0	0.0	1.3
MarShon Brooks	7	0	5.7	.375	.000	1.000	0.7	0.4	0.0	0.0	1.1
Keith Bogans	2	0	11.5	.000	.000		1.0	1.0	0.0	0.0	0.0
Tyshawn Taylor	2	0	1.0	.000			0.0	0.0	0.0	0.0	0.0
Mirza Teletovic	1	0	1.0				0.0	0.0	0.0	0.0	0.0

Player statistics citation:

== Transactions ==
=== Overview ===
Players Added ----

Via draft

- Tyshawn Taylor
- Tornike Shengelia
- İlkan Karaman

Via free agency

- Gerald Wallace
- Mirza Teletović
- Deron Williams
- Brook Lopez
- Jerry Stackhouse
- CJ Watson
- Keith Bogans
- Kris Humphries
- Andray Blatche
- Josh Childress

Via trade

- Joe Johnson
- Tyshawn Taylor
- Tornike Shengelia
- Reggie Evans
Players Lost ----

Via trade

- Anthony Morrow
- Jordan Farmar
- DeShawn Stevenson
- Jordan Williams
- Johan Petro

Via free agency

- Gerald Green
- Shelden Williams
- Sundiata Gaines
- Damion James

Waived

=== Trades ===
June 28, 2012	To Brooklyn Nets----Draft rights to Tyshawn Taylor	To Portland Trail Blazers----Cash considerations
June 28, 2012	To Brooklyn Nets----Draft rights to Tornike Shengelia	To Philadelphia 76ers----Cash considerations
July 2, 2012	To Brooklyn Nets----Joe Johnson	To Atlanta Hawks----Anthony Morrow, Jordan Farmar, DeShawn Stevenson, Jordan Williams, Johan Petro & lottery protected pick

=== Free agents ===
Additions
Player	Date signed	Former team
Gerald Wallace	July 11	Re-signed
Mirza Teletović	July 11	Saski Baskonia
Deron Williams	July 11	Re-signed
Brook Lopez	July 11	Re-signed
Jerry Stackhouse	July 11	Atlanta Hawks
C.J. Watson	July 14	Chicago Bulls
Keith Bogans	July 16	Re-signed
Kris Humphries	July 17	Re-signed
Andray Blatche	September 7	Washington Wizards
Josh Childress	September 11	Phoenix Suns

Subtractions
Player	Reason left	New team
Anthony Morrow; Jordan Farmar; DeShawn Stevenson; Jordan Williams; Johan Petro	Traded	Atlanta Hawks
Gerald Green; Sundiata Gaines	Free agent	Indiana Pacers
Shelden Williams	Free agent	(France) Élan Chalon
Damion James	Waived	Atlanta Hawks
