= Tyshawn Taylor =

American basketball player (born 1990)

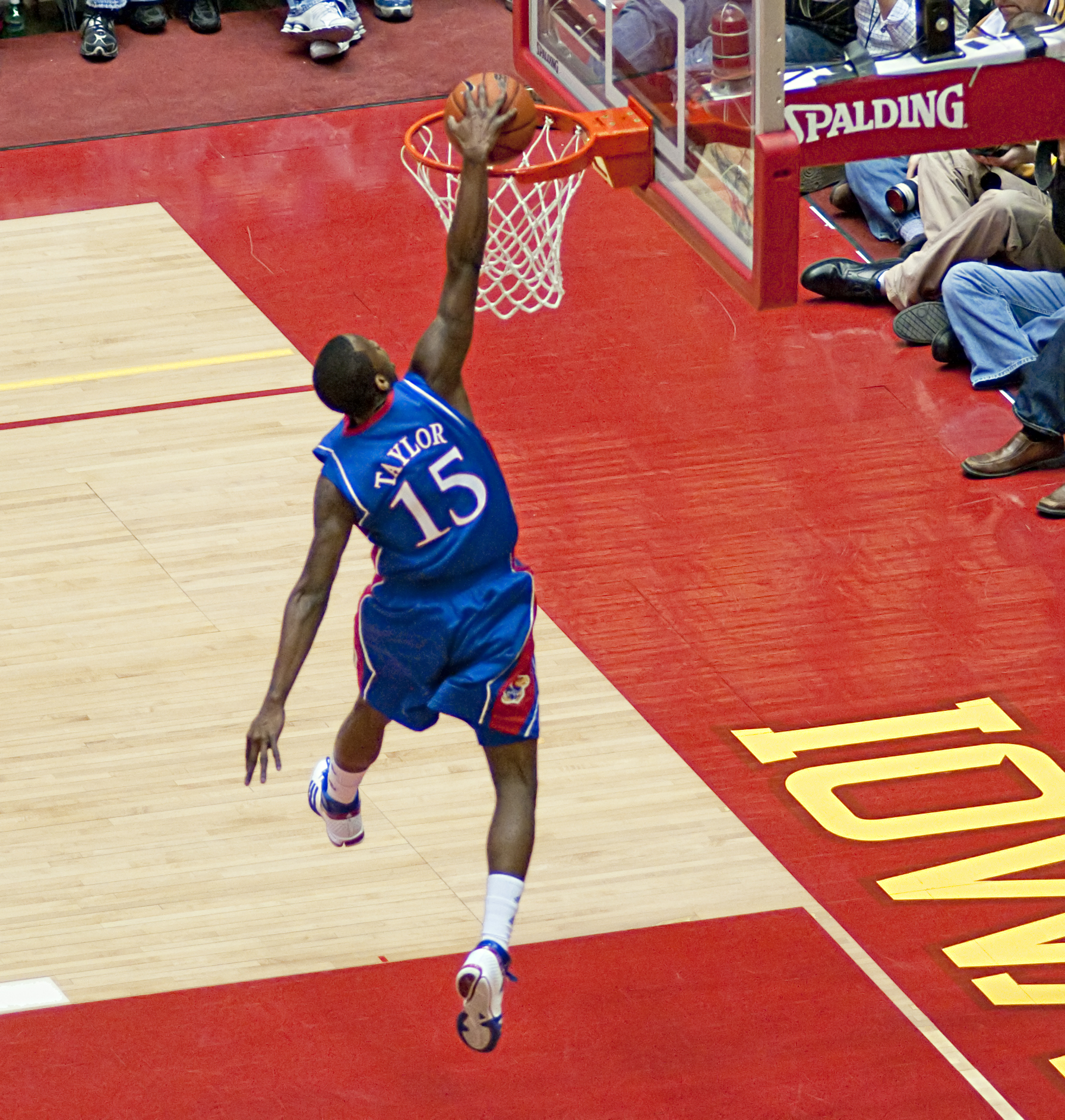
- Taylor with the Kansas Jayhawks in 2009

Personal information
- Born: April 12, 1990 (age 36) Hoboken, New Jersey, U.S.
- Listed height: 6 ft 3 in (1.91 m)
- Listed weight: 200 lb (91 kg)

Career information
- High school: St. Anthony (Jersey City, New Jersey)
- College: Kansas (2008–2012)
- NBA draft: 2012: 2nd round, 41st overall pick
- Drafted by: Portland Trail Blazers
- Playing career: 2012–2021
- Position: Point guard

Career history
- 2012–2014: Brooklyn Nets
- 2012–2014: →Springfield Armor
- 2014: Maine Red Claws
- 2014: Atléticos de San Germán
- 2014–2015: Dynamo Moscow
- 2015: Indios de Mayagüez
- 2016: Guaros de Lara
- 2016–2017: Maccabi Kiryat Gat
- 2017: Ankara DSİ
- 2018: Samsun BSB Anakent
- 2018–2020: Auxilium Torino
- 2020: Saigon Heat

Career highlights
- Venezuela LPB Grand Final MVP (2018); Third-team All-American – AP, SN (2012); First-team All-Big 12 (2012); Big 12 All-Rookie Team (2009)
- Stats at NBA.com
- Stats at Basketball Reference
Medals
Men's basketball
Representing the United States
U-19 World Cup
| Gold medal – first place | 2009 Auckland | Team |

Tyshawn Jamar Taylor (born April 12, 1990) is an American former professional basketball player. He played college basketball for the University of Kansas before he was selected by the Portland Trail Blazers with the 41st overall pick in the 2012 NBA draft.

== High school career ==
Taylor attended St. Anthony High School in New Jersey where he played under renowned high school coach Bob Hurley. During the 2007–08 season, Taylor's team went 32–0 and was awarded the high school basketball mythical national championship by USA Today. Taylor also appeared in the 2009 film The Street Stops Here, a documentary about Hurley and St. Anthony.

Considered a four-star recruit by Rivals.com, Taylor was listed as the No. 11 point guard and the No. 77 player in the nation in 2008.

== College career ==
In 2008–09, Taylor averaged 9.7 points and 3.0 assists per game as he earned Big 12 All-Rookie team honors.

Taylor changed his KU jersey number from 15 to 10 prior to his sophomore year and averaged 7.2 points and 3.4 assists per game on the 2009–10 Kansas Jayhawks men's basketball team who won both the Big 12 regular season and tournament championships.

Taylor averaged 9.3 points and 4.6 assists his junior year. Taylor led the team in assists and was fourth in the Big 12. On February 21, 2011, Taylor was suspended indefinitely from the team for violating team rules. The specifics of the suspension were not announced.

Starting for the fourth straight year, Taylor nearly doubled his career scoring average. Taylor, along with All-American Thomas Robinson, helped lead Kansas to the 2012 national championship game before losing to Kentucky.

=== College statistics ===
| Year | Team | GP | GS | MPG | FG% | 3P% | FT% | RPG | APG | SPG | BPG | PPG |
|---|---|---|---|---|---|---|---|---|---|---|---|---|
| 2008–09 | Kansas | 35 | 33 | 26.5 | .506 | .364 | .724 | 2.2 | 3.0 | 1.1 | .2 | 9.7 |
| 2009–10 | Kansas | 36 | 25 | 23.1 | .438 | .339 | .716 | 2.4 | 3.4 | 1.3 | .2 | 7.2 |
| 2010–11 | Kansas | 36 | 31 | 27.1 | .479 | .380 | .719 | 1.9 | 4.6 | 1.0 | .3 | 9.3 |
| 2011–12 | Kansas | 39 | 38 | 33.4 | .477 | .382 | .688 | 2.3 | 4.8 | 1.3 | .2 | 16.6 |
| Career | | 146 | 127 | 27.7 | .477 | .370 | .708 | 2.2 | 3.9 | 1.2 | .2 | 10.8 |

== Professional career ==
=== Brooklyn Nets (2012–2014) ===
On June 28, 2012, Taylor was selected with the 41st overall pick in the 2012 NBA draft by the Portland Trail Blazers. He was later traded to the Brooklyn Nets in exchange for cash considerations. On July 6, 2012, he signed with the Nets. When Deron Williams was ruled out for final two games before the All-Star break with ankle problems, Taylor was put into the Nets' rotation. In his first game in the rotation, Taylor finished with a career-high 12 points in a career-high 34 minutes as the Nets defeated the Indiana Pacers 89–84 in overtime. On November 25, in a loss against the Los Angeles Lakers, coach Jason Kidd asked Taylor to "accidentally" bump into him because the Nets were out of timeouts. This incident was highlighted as evidence that Coach Kidd was out of his league as a rookie coach. During his rookie and sophomore seasons, he had multiple assignments with the Springfield Armor of the NBA D-League.

=== Maine Red Claws (2014) ===
On January 21, 2014, Taylor was traded to the New Orleans Pelicans in exchange for cash considerations and the rights to Edin Bavčić. On January 23, 2014, he was waived by the Pelicans before playing in a game for them.

On January 30, 2014, Taylor was acquired by the Maine Red Claws.

=== Atléticos de San Germán (2014) ===
On February 21, 2014, Taylor signed with Atléticos de San Germán of Puerto Rico for the 2014 BSN season. On May 23, 2014, he parted ways with Atléticos after 17 games.

=== Dynamo Moscow (2014–2015) ===
On September 17, 2014, Taylor signed with Dynamo Moscow of Russia for the 2014–15 season. He managed to average 9.7 points in 7 games before getting waived on January 13, 2015.

=== Indios de Mayagüez (2015) ===
On February 6, 2015, Taylor signed with Indios de Mayagüez for the 2015 BSN season.

=== Guaros de Lara (2016) ===
On January 28, 2016, Taylor signed with Guaros de Lara of Venezuela for the 2016 LPB season.

=== Maccabi Kiryat Gat (2016–2017) ===
On August 8, 2016, Taylor signed a one-year deal with Maccabi Kiryat Gat of the Israeli Premier League. On January 10, 2017, he was waived by Maccabi.

=== Ankara (2017) ===
On January 23, 2017, Taylor signed with Ankara DSİ of the Turkish Basketball First League.

=== Samsun (2018) ===
On February 1, 2018, Taylor signed with Samsun BSB Anakent of the Turkish Basketball First League.

=== Auxilium Torino (2018–2020) ===
On August 31, 2018, Taylor signed with Italian basketball club Auxilium Torino.

=== Saigon Heat (2020) ===
On January 22, 2020, Taylor signed with Saigon Heat of the ABL.

=== Retirement ===
On October 25, 2021, Taylor announced his retirement.

== The Basketball Tournament (TBT) ==
In the summer of 2017, Taylor, for the third year, competed in The Basketball Tournament on ESPN for Team FOE, a Philadelphia based team coached by NBA forwards Markieff and Marcus Morris. In four games, Taylor averaged 12.8 points, 4.0 rebounds and 2.0 assists per game as Team FOE advanced to the Super 16 Round in Brooklyn, New York. FOE lost 72–67 in the Super 16 against Boeheim's Army, a team composed of Syracuse University basketball alum. Taylor also competed in TBT in 2015 and 2016 as well. In 2016, his first season with Team FOE, Taylor averaged 17.0 points and 3.7 rebounds over the course of three games. Previous to that, he played for the Jabroni Project in 2015.

== NBA career statistics ==
Legend
| GP | Games played | GS | Games started | MPG | Minutes per game |
| FG% | Field goal percentage | 3P% | 3-point field goal percentage | FT% | Free throw percentage |
| RPG | Rebounds per game | APG | Assists per game | SPG | Steals per game |
| BPG | Blocks per game | PPG | Points per game | **Bold** | Career high |

=== Regular season ===
| Year | Team | GP | GS | MPG | FG% | 3P% | FT% | RPG | APG | SPG | BPG | PPG |
|---|---|---|---|---|---|---|---|---|---|---|---|---|
| 2012–13 | Brooklyn | 38 | 0 | 5.8 | **.368** | **.462** | .556 | .5 | .6 | .3 | .0 | 2.2 |
| 2013–14 | Brooklyn | 23 | **3** | **11.7** | .341 | .250 | **.800** | **.7** | **1.6** | **.5** | .0 | **3.9** |
| Career | | 61 | 3 | 8.0 | .354 | .360 | .684 | .5 | .9 | .4 | .0 | 2.9 |

=== Playoffs ===
| Year | Team | GP | GS | MPG | FG% | 3P% | FT% | RPG | APG | SPG | BPG | PPG |
|---|---|---|---|---|---|---|---|---|---|---|---|---|
| 2013 | Brooklyn | 2 | 0 | 1.0 | .000 | .000 | .000 | .0 | .0 | .0 | .0 | .0 |
| Career | | 2 | 0 | 1.0 | .000 | .000 | .000 | .0 | .0 | .0 | .0 | .0 |

== International career ==
Taylor represented USA Basketball as they won the 2009 FIBA Under-19 World Cup. Taylor averaged a team-high 10.8 points and a team-high 4.4 assists per game. His team-high 18 points and 6 assists in the final game against Greece helped secure the championship for the United States. After the tournament, Taylor was named to the five-person All-Star team for the tournament, along with teammate Gordon Hayward.
