= Reggie Evans =

American basketball player (born 1980)

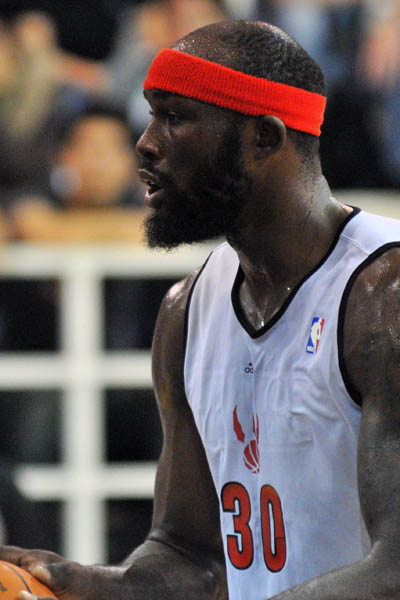
- Evans with the Toronto Raptors in 2010

Personal information
- Born: May 18, 1980 (age 46) Pensacola, Florida, U.S.
- Listed height: 6 ft 8 in (2.03 m)
- Listed weight: 245 lb (111 kg)

Career information
- High school: Woodham (Pensacola, Florida)
- College: Coffeyville CC (1998–2000); Iowa (2000–2002)
- NBA draft: 2002: undrafted
- Playing career: 2002–2015
- Position: Power forward
- Number: 34, 30

Career history
- 2002–2006: Seattle SuperSonics
- 2006–2007: Denver Nuggets
- 2007–2009: Philadelphia 76ers
- 2009–2011: Toronto Raptors
- 2011–2012: Los Angeles Clippers
- 2012–2014: Brooklyn Nets
- 2014–2015: Sacramento Kings

Career highlights
- 2× Second-team All-Big Ten (2001, 2002)

Career statistics
- Points: 3,289 (4.1 ppg)
- Rebounds: 5,765 (7.1 rpg)
- Assists: 458 (0.6 apg)
- Stats at NBA.com
- Stats at Basketball Reference
Medals
Men's basketball
Representing United States
FIBA U21 World Championship
Gold medal – first place	2001 Saitama	Team competition

Reginald Jamaal Evans (born May 18, 1980) is an American former professional basketball player who last played in the Big3 League. A Power forward, Evans played 13 seasons in the NBA with seven teams. Evans was known for his rebounding, tenacity and hustle on the defensive end.

== College career ==
Evans attended Coffeyville Community College in Coffeyville, Kansas from 1998 to 2000 and then transferred to the University of Iowa. In 2001, he led the nation in free throws attempted, free throws made, and double-doubles. He also led the Big Ten Conference in rebounding and double doubles in 2001 and 2002, was named Big Ten Tournament Most Outstanding Player in 2001, second-team All-Big Ten in 2002, and Honorable Mention All-American in 2001.

== Professional career ==
=== Seattle SuperSonics (2002–2006) ===
Evans signed with the Seattle SuperSonics as a free-agent in 2002, where he became known for his tenacious rebounding. In 2004–05, he led the league in rebounds-per-minute-played after finishing in the top 10 the two previous seasons. Despite playing under 24 minutes per game, he finished ninth in the NBA in total rebounds. A 2005 statistical analysis published on ESPN determined that on average, Evans will rebound one quarter of all shots missed while he is in a game. In the 2006 season this dipped to 21.5 percent, however, this was still good enough to edge out teammate Marcus Camby for the best rebound rate in the NBA.

Evans made the news on December 6, 2005, when he was absent for the opening minutes of the second half in a loss to the New York Knicks. Circumstances did not allow Evans to take a steroid test prior to the game, so a league official required that it be done at halftime. Evans laughed off the suggestion he was under suspicion. "I've been clean since I've been in the league. I've been clean since I've been in college. I've been clean since I've been in high school, middle school, elementary school. I'm just cleaner than clean. I'm cleaner than Pine-Sol."

Evans's best statistical season came to a halt on January 3, 2006, when the Sonics front office dismissed head coach Bob Weiss and promoted assistant Bob Hill to replace him. In Hill's new system, Evans lost his starting spot and his minutes were drastically reduced.

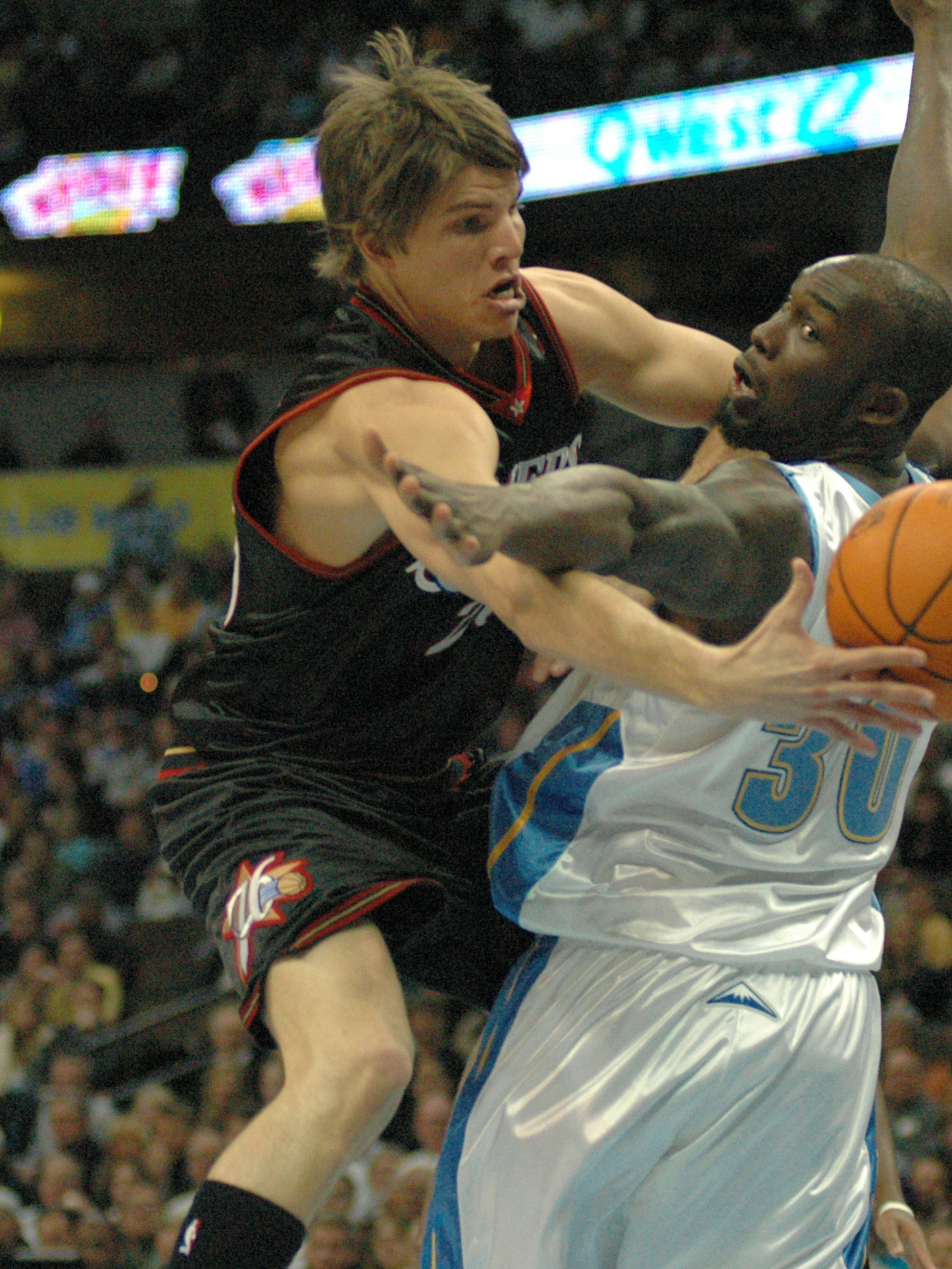
Evans defends against Kyle Korver

=== Denver Nuggets (2006–2007) ===
On February 23, 2006, the Sonics traded Evans to the Denver Nuggets. In his first five games with the division-leading Nuggets, Evans played more minutes than he did in his final 21 games with the Sonics.

On March 10, 2006, against the Toronto Raptors, Evans had zero points but 20 rebounds. Evans became the first player with 20 rebounds in a scoreless game since Dennis Rodman did it for Chicago on December 15, 1997, against Phoenix.

During a 2006 game, Evans yanked Los Angeles Clippers center Chris Kaman by the testicles in an attempt to gain a position advantage. Kaman immediately pushed Evans to the floor and later said, "I felt I got a little violated by another man." However, Kaman ultimately decided not to press assault charges against Evans. Evans was fined $10,000 and a flagrant foul-two for his actions.

=== Philadelphia 76ers (2007–2009) ===
On September 10, 2007, he was traded along with the draft rights to Ricky Sanchez to the Philadelphia 76ers in exchange for Steven Hunter and Bobby Jones.

Evans was put in as the starting power forward for the Sixers 2007–08 NBA season. He took the Sixers from the worst rebounding team, to the top 15. He missed only one game the whole season, and started more games than in his two with Denver. During game three of the Sixers' first round playoff series against the Detroit Pistons, Evans scored 9 points and grabbed 5 rebounds en route to a Sixers' victory amidst chants of "Reg-gie! Reg-gie!" from the Philadelphia fans at the Wachovia Center.

=== Toronto Raptors (2009–2011) ===
On June 9, 2009, Evans was traded to the Toronto Raptors in exchange for Jason Kapono. Evans started the season with a foot injury and did not play a game for the Raptors until February 10, 2010. On November 24, 2010, Evans pulled down a then-career high 22 rebounds (along with 12 points) in the Raptors' 106–90 win over the Philadelphia 76ers.

=== Los Angeles Clippers (2011–2012) ===
On December 22, 2011, Evans signed a one-year contract with the Los Angeles Clippers. He would finish the season with an average of 1.9 points and 4.8 rebounds in 13.8 minutes per game over 56 games, becoming a fan favorite along the way for his physical style of play.

=== Brooklyn Nets (2012–2014) ===
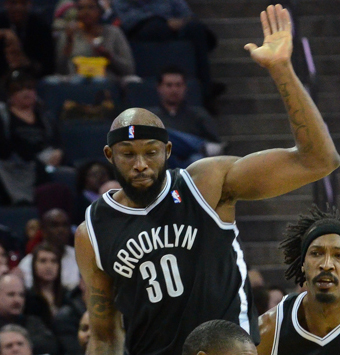
Evans with the Nets in 2013

On July 11, 2012, Evans was traded to the Brooklyn Nets in a sign-and-trade deal. On November 21, 2012, he became the first NBA player to be fined for flopping after a 95–90 loss to the Los Angeles Lakers. One league executive had called Evans "the star" of flopping in a preseason demonstration video.

While Nets player Kris Humphries was out with an injury, Evans was given the opportunity to start. He remained in the starting lineup afterwards, as the Nets decided to start Evans over Humphries. On March 27 in a game against the Portland Trail Blazers, Evans notched career highs in both points (22) and rebounds (26) as the Nets won 111–93. 2 days later in a game against the Denver Nuggets, Evans had another great night with 15 points and 16 rebounds but the Nets lost 109–87. Evans said he heard a teammate say to Nets coach P. J. Carlesimo to bench Evans because of lack of offensive production. Evans used this as inspiration to be more aggressive on the offensive end of the floor. In his first season with the Nets, Evans played 80 games with 56 starts, and for the second time in his career, he averaged over 10 rebounds a game with 11.1.

=== Sacramento Kings (2014–2015) ===
On February 19, 2014, the Brooklyn Nets traded Evans and guard Jason Terry to the Sacramento Kings in exchange for guard Marcus Thornton.

Having only played in nine of the Kings' first 16 games to start the 2014–15 season, and having not played in the previous seven games, Evans made up for the absence of starting center DeMarcus Cousins against the Memphis Grizzlies as he recorded 17 points on 7-of-10 shooting and 20 rebounds in 35 minutes off the bench. The seldom-used Evans sparked Sacramento back into the game during the third quarter, getting Marc Gasol in foul trouble and slicing Memphis' lead to 74–65 heading to the fourth. However, the Kings went on to lose the game, 97–85.

Evans' final NBA game was played on April 10, 2015, in a 103 - 116 loss to the Oklahoma City Thunder where he recorded 1 rebound and 1 steal.

=== BIG3 Basketball ===
In 2017, Evans joined the BIG3 basketball league's Killer 3's team, playing alongside Charles Oakley (who also was the head coach), Chauncey Billups, and Stephen Jackson. In 2018, Evans joined the BIG3 basketball league's 3 Headed Monsters, playing alongside Rashard Lewis and Mahmoud Abdul-Rauf, and being coached by Gary Payton.

== NBA career statistics ==
Legend
GP	Games played	GS	Games started	MPG	Minutes per game
FG%	Field goal percentage	3P%	3-point field goal percentage	FT%	Free throw percentage
RPG	Rebounds per game	APG	Assists per game	SPG	Steals per game
BPG	Blocks per game	PPG	Points per game	**Bold**	Career high

=== Regular season ===
Year	Team	GP	GS	MPG	FG%	3P%	FT%	RPG	APG	SPG	BPG	PPG
2002–03	Seattle	67	60	20.4	.471	.000	.519	6.6	.5	.6	**.2**	3.2
2003–04	Seattle	75	27	17.1	.406	.000	.561	5.4	.4	.7	.1	2.9
2004–05	Seattle	79	**79**	23.8	.476	.000	.534	9.3	.7	.7	**.2**	4.9
2005–06	Seattle	41	23	19.2	.509	.000	.550	6.7	.6	.6	.1	**5.9**
2005–06	Denver	26	2	23.3	.453	.000	.505	8.7	.6	.6	**.2**	5.2
2006–07	Denver	66	11	17.1	**.544**	.000	.497	7.0	.7	.6	**.2**	4.9
2007–08	Philadelphia	**81**	61	23.2	.439	**1.000**	.467	7.5	.8	**1.1**	.1	5.2
2008–09	Philadelphia	79	7	14.4	.444	.000	.594	4.6	.3	.5	.1	3.3
2009–10	Toronto	28	1	11.1	.493	.000	.450	3.8	.3	.5	.1	3.4
2010–11	Toronto	30	18	**26.6**	.408	.000	.545	**11.5**	**1.3**	1.0	**.2**	4.4
2011–12	L.A. Clippers	56	0	13.8	.472	.000	.507	4.8	.3	.6	.1	1.9
2012–13	Brooklyn	80	56	24.6	.479	.000	.509	11.1	.5	.9	**.2**	4.5
2013–14	Brooklyn	30	6	13.3	.390	.000	.538	5.0	.2	.4	.1	2.7
2013–14	Sacramento	24	14	20.8	.527	.000	.569	7.7	.7	1.0	.0	5.5
2014–15	Sacramento	47	7	16.3	.423	.000	**.619**	6.4	.7	.5	.1	3.7
**Career**		809	372	19.2	.465	.091	.528	7.1	.6	.7	.1	4.1

=== Playoffs ===
Year	Team	GP	GS	MPG	FG%	3P%	FT%	RPG	APG	SPG	BPG	PPG
2005	Seattle	**11**	**11**	18.9	.405	.000	.524	7.4	.5	.5	.3	3.7
2006	Denver	5	0	13.8	.429	.000	.722	4.6	.0	.4	.2	3.8
2008	Philadelphia	6	0	24.7	.500	.000	.625	7.8	.5	.8	.0	**6.8**
2009	Philadelphia	5	0	7.2	.222	.000	**.750**	2.0	.0	.6	.0	1.4
2012	L.A. Clippers	**11**	0	18.0	**.533**	.000	.425	7.3	.1	.8	**.5**	3.0
2013	Brooklyn	7	7	**29.9**	.478	.000	.556	**12.3**	**.9**	**1.0**	.3	4.6
**Career**		45	18	19.3	.444	.000	.552	7.3	.3	.7	.3	3.8

== Personal life ==
Evans is a relative of football player Tre Odoms-Dukes.
