= List of largest comebacks in NBA games =

This is a list of the largest deficits overcome to win NBA games, from the regular season or postseason. Wins after trailing by 25 points or more have been rare in NBA history, with only a few dozen out of tens of thousands of regular season games, and thousands of playoff games. A team may have a second-half comeback after having fallen well behind in the first half, or a fourth-quarter comeback after having fallen well behind with only one quarter of play remaining.

The greatest comeback in National Basketball Association play occurred on November 27, 1996, when the Utah Jazz, down by 36 points to the Denver Nuggets late in the second quarter (it was 70–36 at the half and 70–34 just before), overcame this deficit to win 107–103.

The largest comeback in a playoff game occurred in 2019 when the Los Angeles Clippers overcame the Golden State Warriors 135–131 after trailing by 31 points. The largest comeback in the NBA Finals was Game 4 of the 2026 Finals, when the New York Knicks came back from a 29-point deficit to defeat the San Antonio Spurs by a score of 107-106.

The following comebacks are sorted based on a points deficit basis:

== Regular season ==
Largest deficits overcome to win NBA games
Largest deficit	Season	Date	Winning team	Losing team	Scores	Notes	Ref
36 points	1996–97	November 27, 1996	Utah Jazz	Denver Nuggets	Nuggets led 70–34; Jazz won 107–103	Current NBA record. The Jazz, playing before a hometown crowd at the Delta Center, trailed 70 to 36 at halftime. Led by the scoring efforts of Karl Malone with 31 points and Jeff Hornacek contributing 29 points, the Jazz came back to win 107 to 103.	
35 points	2021–22	January 25, 2022	Los Angeles Clippers	Washington Wizards	Wizards led 66–31; Clippers won 116–115	Nearing halftime, the Wizards had a commanding lead over the Clippers, as they led by as much as 35 in the quarter. The Wizards gave up 80 points to the Clippers in the second half, including a 4-point play with 1.9 seconds to go by Luke Kennard. Kennard scored the final 7 points for the Clippers in 9 seconds.	
35 points	2009–10	December 21, 2009	Sacramento Kings	Chicago Bulls	Bulls led 79–44; Kings won 102–98	Trailing for three quarters, with the largest deficit at 35 points (44-79) with 8:49 remaining in the third quarter, the Kings rallied behind the scoring of Tyreke Evans' 23 points. Sacramento overcame the Bulls in the fourth quarter despite a 26-point performance by Chicago's Luol Deng.	
32 points	2020–21	April 30, 2021	Boston Celtics	San Antonio Spurs	Spurs led 84–52; Celtics won 143–140 (OT)	The Boston Celtics trailed by as many as 32 points late in the second quarter, including an 84–53 deficit in the third quarter. The Celtics outscored the Spurs 42–26 in the third quarter to cut the lead to 13. Led by Jayson Tatum's 60 points, the Celtics managed to force overtime and win narrowly 143–140.	
31 points	1975–76	November 27, 1975	Golden State Warriors	Milwaukee Bucks	Bucks led 52–21; Warriors won 106–105	Golden State trailed by 31 points in the second quarter before rallying to win by one point. Gus Williams scored 13 of his 22 points in the fourth quarter, including the basket that gave the Warriors their first lead in the final minute. The Warriors outscored Milwaukee 32–14 in the fourth quarter.	
30 points	2023–24	March 25, 2024	Atlanta Hawks	Boston Celtics	Celtics led 68–38; Hawks won 120–118	After Al Horford made a three pointer with 4:23 remaining in the 2nd quarter, the Hawks trailed 68-38. Atlanta rallied back to take the lead on a Wesley Matthews three with 9:58 remaining in the final quarter. The game went back and forth for the rest of it, until De'Andre Hunter made a dagger three to extend the Hawks' lead to four with 9.2 seconds remaining, and Atlanta won 120-118.	
30 points	2019–20	December 22, 2019	Toronto Raptors	Dallas Mavericks	Mavericks led 85–55; Raptors won 110–107	The Raptors were down 85–55 with 2:55 to go in the 3rd quarter. The Raptors then scored 47 points in the 4th quarter to win 110–107, led by Kyle Lowry who scored 20 of his 32 points in the fourth quarter.	
30 points	2002–03	December 6, 2002	Los Angeles Lakers	Dallas Mavericks	Mavericks led 95–65; Lakers won 105–103	The Los Angeles Lakers were down 30 in the 3rd quarter and trailing by 27 entering the 4th. On the back of 21 points from Kobe Bryant, the Lakers came back to win 105–103.	
30 points	1987–88	March 25, 1988	Philadelphia 76ers	Boston Celtics	Celtics led 75–45; 76ers won 97–93	Philadelphia trailed by 30 points with 7:31 remaining in the third quarter before outscoring Boston 52–18 over the remainder of the game. Maurice Cheeks scored the go-ahead basket with nine seconds remaining, ending a 15-game road losing streak against the Celtics.	
29 points	2026–27	October 22, 2026	Philadelphia 76ers	Cleveland Cavaliers	Cavaliers led 69–40 76ers won 114–106	In their home opener, the Philadelphia 76ers trailed the Cleveland Cavaliers 40–69 late in the 2nd quarter before mounting a 29–point comeback to win 114–106, led by Tyrese Maxey's 32 points.	
29 points	2022–23	March 17, 2023	Memphis Grizzlies	San Antonio Spurs	Spurs led 51–22; Grizzlies won 126–120 (OT)	The Memphis Grizzlies not only had the biggest comeback of the season, but also broke the record for the biggest comeback in franchise history. Jaren Jackson Jr. led the comeback with 28 points, while Devin Vassell scored 25 points in a losing effort. The Grizzlies won 126–120 in overtime.	
29 points	2008–09	December 30, 2008	Dallas Mavericks	Minnesota Timberwolves	Timberwolves led 86–57; Mavericks won 107–100	The Dallas Mavericks defeated the Minnesota Timberwolves 107 to 100 on December 30, 2008 to overcome a 29-point third quarter deficit. Jason Terry led all Mavericks scorers with 29 points while Dirk Nowitzki added 24 points. The game was played at Dallas' American Airlines Center.	
29 points	2003–04	December 5, 2003	Phoenix Suns	Boston Celtics	Celtics led 65–36; Suns won 110–106	Phoenix trailed by 29 points early in the third quarter before rallying behind Stephon Marbury, who scored 21 of his 34 points in the second half. Marbury made two late three-pointers to complete the largest comeback in Suns franchise history at the time.	
29 points	1977–78	November 25, 1977	Milwaukee Bucks	Atlanta Hawks	Hawks led 96–67; Bucks won 117–115	Current NBA fourth-quarter record. At the time the largest comeback in NBA history, what is now the fifth largest NBA comeback occurred at Atlanta's Omni Coliseum on November 25, 1977. The Milwaukee Bucks, down 29 points to the Atlanta Hawks, came back to win 117–115. Milwaukee's Junior Bridgerman led the comeback effort with 24 points and held off Atlanta's high scorer John Drew with 30 points on the night.	
28 points	2022–23	March 3, 2023	Brooklyn Nets	Boston Celtics	Celtics led 51–23; Nets won 115–105	The Brooklyn Nets came back from a 23–51 second-quarter deficit with 7:32 remaining to defeat the Boston Celtics in TD Garden. The Nets tied the game at 70 at 6:45 in the third quarter and outscored the Celtics 92 to 54 to win 115–105. Mikal Bridges scored a game-high 38 points for Brooklyn. This was the biggest comeback in the 2022-23 NBA Season.	
28 points	2021–22	February 16, 2022	Brooklyn Nets	New York Knicks	Knicks led 61–33; Nets won 111–106	The Brooklyn Nets overcame a 28-point deficit against the New York Knicks in Madison Square Garden, ultimately winning 111–106. Nets rookie Cam Thomas scored 16 points in the fourth quarter, including a 29-foot three with 6.8 seconds left to seal the win for the Nets.	
28 points	2018–19	April 10, 2019	Portland Trail Blazers	Sacramento Kings	Kings led 81–53; Trail Blazers won 136–131	The Portland Trail Blazers defeated the Sacramento Kings from a 28-point deficit on April 10, 2019 at home court. The Kings led by 28 points with 30 seconds left in the first half. 136–131 was the final score.	
28 points	2018–19	March 19, 2019	Brooklyn Nets	Sacramento Kings	Kings led 81–53; Nets won 123–121	The Brooklyn Nets defeated the Sacramento Kings from a 28-point deficit on March 19, 2019 at the Golden1 Center. D'Angelo Russell scored 27 points in the fourth quarter to lead the Nets to win, setting a new career-high of 44 points in the game.	
28 points	2018–19	February 9, 2019	Los Angeles Clippers	Boston Celtics	Celtics led 94–66; Clippers won 123–112	The Los Angeles Clippers defeated the Boston Celtics on February 9, 2019 to overcome a 28-point deficit at the TD Garden. Montrezl Harell led the Clippers in scoring with 21 points in the comeback effort. Kyrie Irving sprained his ankle with 4:09 left in the 2nd quarter and exited the game with 2:28 left in the quarter.	
28 points	2016–17	March 8, 2017	San Antonio Spurs	Sacramento Kings	Kings led 59–31; Spurs won 114–104	San Antonio erased a 28-point second-quarter deficit to defeat Sacramento by ten points, completing the largest comeback of the 2016–17 NBA season.	
28 points	2000–01	March 7, 2001	Sacramento Kings	Phoenix Suns	Suns led 60–32; Kings won 100–89	Sacramento trailed by 28 points in the second quarter before rallying to defeat Phoenix by 11 points. It was the largest comeback victory of the 2000–01 NBA season.	
28 points	1998–99	April 20, 1999	Los Angeles Lakers	Golden State Warriors	Warriors led 47–19; Lakers won 106–102	Los Angeles overcame a 28-point second-quarter deficit to defeat Golden State by four points, completing the largest comeback of the lockout-shortened 1998–99 NBA season.	
27 points	2024–25	April 13, 2025	Indiana Pacers	Cleveland Cavaliers	Cavaliers led 74–47; Pacers won 126–118 (2OT)	Indiana overcame a 27-point third-quarter deficit, including a 23-point fourth-quarter deficit, to win in double overtime. The comeback was the largest in Pacers franchise history and secured the team's 50th victory of the season.	
27 points	2022–23	February 26, 2023	Los Angeles Lakers	Dallas Mavericks	Mavericks led 45–18; Lakers won 111–108	At American Airlines Center, the Lakers were trailing by a score of 18–45 5 minutes into the 2nd Quarter. Vanderbilt sparked the comeback and had a great defensive game with 17 rebounds. At halftime they were down 47–61, 13 points less. Anthony Davis led the comeback with 30 points and 15 rebounds. A late foul call led to Dennis Schröder making a free throw and sealing the comeback as the Lakers won 111–108.	
27 points	2017–18	February 14, 2018	Washington Wizards	New York Knicks	Knicks led 68–41; Wizards won 118–113	Washington overcame a 27-point second-quarter deficit to defeat New York by five points, with Bradley Beal scoring 36 points in the effort.	
27 points	2013–14	December 3, 2013	Golden State Warriors	Toronto Raptors	Raptors led 75–48; Warriors won 112–103	At Oracle Arena in Oakland, the Toronto Raptors held a 75–48 advantage over the Golden State Warriors with just over 9 minutes remaining in the third quarter. Led by Steph Curry and Klay Thompson, the Warriors outscored Toronto 64–28 in the final 21:20 by means of tremendous 3-point shooting to come away with a 112–103 win at home.	
27 points	2012–13	November 26, 2012	Milwaukee Bucks	Chicago Bulls	Bulls led 78–51; Bucks won 93–92	Milwaukee overcame a 27-point third-quarter deficit, including a 17-point deficit entering the fourth quarter, outscoring Chicago 30–12 in the final period to earn a one-point victory.	
27 points	2012–13	March 20, 2013	Miami Heat	Cleveland Cavaliers	Cavaliers led 67–40; Heat won 98–95	At Quicken Loans Arena, the Miami Heat overcame at the time league high 27-point third-quarter deficit to beat the Cleveland Cavaliers 98–95 and extend their winning streak to 24 games. This was the largest comeback in the franchise's history.	
27 points	2012–13	January 25, 2013	Atlanta Hawks	Boston Celtics	Celtics led 48–21; Hawks won 123–111 (2OT)	Atlanta overcame a 27-point first-half deficit and a ten-point deficit late in regulation to defeat Boston in double overtime. Kyle Korver scored 27 points as the Hawks handed the Celtics their sixth consecutive loss.	
27 points	2011–12	January 26, 2012	Boston Celtics	Orlando Magic	Magic led 52–25; Celtics won 91–83	Boston overcame a 27-point second-quarter deficit, holding Orlando to eight points in the fourth quarter and outscoring them 54–25 overall in the second half.	
27 points	1996–97	March 2, 1997	Phoenix Suns	Dallas Mavericks	Mavericks led 85–58; Suns won 109–108 (OT)	Phoenix overcame a 27-point third-quarter deficit and an 18-point deficit entering the fourth quarter to force overtime, and then defeated Dallas by one point.	
27 points	1966–67	January 8, 1967	New York Knicks	Los Angeles Lakers	Lakers led 41–14; Knicks won 121–118	New York trailed 41–14 at the end of the first quarter before scoring 43 points in the second quarter to reduce the deficit to nine at halftime. The Knicks completed the comeback with a 32-point fourth quarter to win 121–118.	

== Post-season ==
Largest deficits overcome to win NBA playoff games
Largest deficit	Season	Date	Winning team	Losing team	Scores	Notes	Ref
31 points	2018–19	April 15, 2019	Los Angeles Clippers	Golden State Warriors	Warriors led 94–63; Clippers won 135–131	Current NBA postseason record. The Los Angeles Clippers trailed 94–63 with 7:31 left in the 3rd quarter as Stephen Curry was benched for his 4th foul of the game. The Clippers cut it down to as much as 2 mid-way through the 4th quarter. Landry Shamet made a game winning 3 pointer with 15.9 seconds left to give the Clippers a 133–131 lead. Lou Williams led the Clippers with 36 points in the comeback effort as Montrezl Harrell helped with 25 points as the 2nd leading scorer of the game and hit 2 free throws to seal the game. The Clippers won the game 135–131 in the comeback effort.	
29 points	2025–26	June 10, 2026	New York Knicks	San Antonio Spurs	Spurs led 81–52; Knicks won 107–106	Current NBA Finals record. In the 2026 NBA Finals, the Knicks trailed by as much as 81–52 with 9:27 left in the third quarter when the Spurs' Victor Wembanyama was called for a flagrant foul. The Knicks cut the lead to 90–75 by the end of the quarter and eventually won the game 107–106 on OG Anunoby's tip-in with 1.2 seconds left, completing the largest comeback in NBA Finals history.	
29 points	2024–25	April 24, 2025	Oklahoma City Thunder	Memphis Grizzlies	Grizzlies led 69–40; Thunder won 114–108	The Oklahoma City Thunder trailed 69–40 with 3:07 left in the 2nd quarter and ended the first half trailing 77-55. The Thunder cut it down 95–87 by the end of the 3rd quarter. The Thunder tied the game 3 times in the 4th quarter (99-99 7:58, 105-105 5:04, 108-108 2:39) before ending the game on 6–0 run to win 114-108.	
29 points	1988–89	May 4, 1989	Los Angeles Lakers	Seattle SuperSonics	SuperSonics led 41–12; Lakers won 97–95	Trailing 41–12 early in the second quarter, the Lakers mounted a comeback that cut the SuperSonics' lead to 54–43 by half-time, 73–65 by the end of the 3rd quarter, and finally won the game 97–95.	
27 points	2011–12	April 29, 2012	Los Angeles Clippers	Memphis Grizzlies	Grizzlies led 84–57; Clippers won 99–98	The Clippers trailed by 27 points late in the third quarter and by 21 entering the fourth quarter before closing the game on a 28–3 run to win 99–98 in Game 1 of the Western Conference First Round.	
26 points	2021–22	April 21, 2022	Memphis Grizzlies	Minnesota Timberwolves	Timberwolves led 83–57; Grizzlies won 104–95	The Memphis Grizzlies came back after trailnts, 10 rebounds and 10 assists. The Memphis Grizzlies, down by 83–67 at the end of the third quarter, outscored the Minnesota Timberwolves 37–12 in the fourth quarter to win the game 104–95.	
26 points	2020–21	June 16, 2021	Atlanta Hawks	Philadelphia 76ers	76ers led 68–42; Hawks won 109–106	The Atlanta Hawks came back after being down 26 with 8:31 left in the third quarter. Joel Embiid and Seth Curry were the only 76ers players to make field goals in the second half, allowing for the Atlanta Hawks to win 109–106.	
26 points	2016–17	April 20, 2017	Cleveland Cavaliers	Indiana Pacers	Pacers led 74–48; Cavaliers won 119–114	Trailing by as much as 26, the Cleveland Cavaliers overcame a 25-point half-time deficit to take a commanding 3–0 First round series lead over the Indiana Pacers and further fuel what would become a historic 10-game playoff win-streak. LeBron James would score 41 points and a triple-double in another career night performance.	
26 points	2001–02	May 25, 2002	Boston Celtics	New Jersey Nets	Nets led 61–35; Celtics won 94–90	Paul Pierce lead the Boston Celtics to a 26-point comeback against the New Jersey Nets to win Game 3 of the 2002 Eastern Conference Finals by a score of 94–90, outscoring the Nets 41–16 in the fourth quarter.	
25 points	2020–21	June 18, 2021	Los Angeles Clippers	Utah Jazz	Jazz led 75–50; Clippers won 131–119	The Los Angeles Clippers had been trailing as much as 25 points during the game. In the 3rd and 4th quarters, the Clippers embarked on large runs to eventually seal the game 131–119, winning the Western Conference Semifinal series in Game 6 and advancing to their first Western Conference Final.	
25 points	2017–18	April 25, 2018	Oklahoma City Thunder	Utah Jazz	Jazz led 71–46; Thunder won 107–99	The Oklahoma City Thunder erased a 25-point comeback in the third quarter of the NBA first round against the Utah Jazz. Russell Westbrook's 45 points and Paul George's 34 points saved the Thunder from elimination to force a Game 6.	
25 points	2016–17	May 14, 2017	Golden State Warriors	San Antonio Spurs	Spurs led 78–53; Warriors won 113–111	The Golden State Warriors came back from a 25-point deficit, led by Steph Curry's 40 points and Kevin Durant's 34 points. Curry led the team with 7 made threes and 14 made field goals. Precipitating the comeback was the injury of the Spurs' first option, Kawhi Leonard. The Warriors won 113–111.	

== See also ==
- Comeback (sports)
- List of NBA regular season team records
