= Larry Sanders (basketball) =

American basketball player (born 1988)

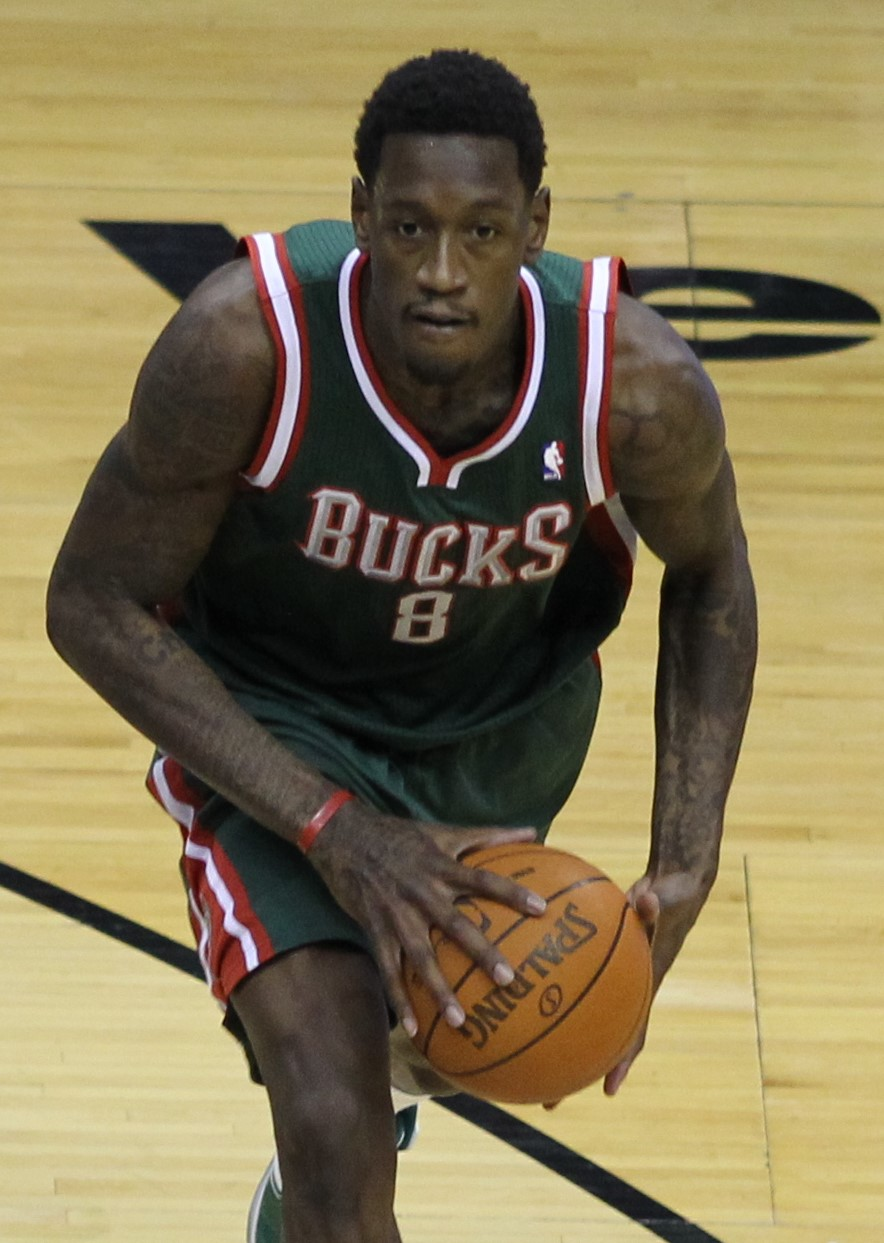
- Sanders with the Milwaukee Bucks in 2011

Personal information
- Born: November 21, 1988 (age 37) Fort Pierce, Florida, U.S.
- Listed height: 6 ft 11 in (2.11 m)
- Listed weight: 230 lb (104 kg)

Career information
- High school: Port St. Lucie (Port St. Lucie, Florida)
- College: VCU (2007–2010)
- NBA draft: 2010: 1st round, 15th overall pick
- Drafted by: Milwaukee Bucks
- Playing career: 2010–2017, 2024
- Position: Center / power forward
- Number: 8, 9

Career history
- 2010–2015: Milwaukee Bucks
- 2011: →Fort Wayne Mad Ants
- 2017: Cleveland Cavaliers
- 2017: →Canton Charge
- 2024: Taoyuan Taiwan Beer Leopards

Career highlights
- First-team All-CAA (2010); Second-team All-CAA (2009); 2× CAA Defensive Player of the Year (2009, 2010); 3× CAA All-Defensive Team (2008–2010); CAA All-Freshman Team (2008)
- Stats at NBA.com
- Stats at Basketball Reference

Larry Sanders (born November 21, 1988) is an American former professional basketball player. He played power forward for the Virginia Commonwealth University Rams before declaring himself eligible for the 2010 NBA draft and was selected 15th overall by the Milwaukee Bucks.

== High school career ==
Sanders did not play basketball in the ninth grade, and the private school he attended did not offer it. However, after he transferred to Port St. Lucie High School, the school's basketball coach, Kareem Rodriguez, saw potential in the then 6'1" Sanders and prevailed on him to play for the team. Sanders grew to 6'4" in his second year and to 6'6" in his third. He would sprout further to 6'9" in his senior year. His production and growth spurt was enough that Rodriguez alerted his friend Tony Pujol, an assistant at Virginia Commonwealth University (VCU), to watch out for him. He began garnering statewide attention in his junior campaign as he helped Port St. Lucie reach the Class 5A state semifinals. In his senior year, while averaging 18.9 points and 13 rebounds, Sanders led Port St. Lucie (20–8) to the District 13-5A Championship, and was named by the Associated Press to the First Team All-State. He committed to the VCU Rams when major schools only just started to take interest in him.

== College career ==
At VCU, he was keen to train under its then head coach Anthony Grant, who was known to have tutored standout big men at the University of Florida while he was still an assistant there. For his first two seasons for VCU, Sanders played 2nd star to guard Eric Maynor. He excelled in that role, utilizing his size and athleticism to disrupt teams defensively. As a sophomore, he helped the Rams into the 2009 NCAA tournament against the UCLA Bruins, but lost 65–64 in the first round of the tournament. Sanders went on to have a more prominent role in his junior season after Maynor was drafted into the NBA. As a junior Sanders averaged 14.4 points, 9.1 rebounds, and 2.6 blocks, with 53% field-goal accuracy, all statistical team highs, on his way to earning the second of his consecutive CAA Defensive Player of the Year awards in 2008–09 and 2009–10.

Larry Sanders announced in April 2010 after his junior year that he was departing VCU early to enter the NBA draft.

== Professional career ==
=== Milwaukee Bucks (2010–2015) ===
Sanders was chosen by the Milwaukee Bucks with the 15th overall pick in the 2010 NBA draft. On July 8, 2010, he signed a multi-year, rookie scaled contract with the Bucks. On February 20, 2011, Sanders was assigned to the Fort Wayne Mad Ants of the NBA D-League. On February 26, he was recalled by the Bucks.

On November 30, 2012, Sanders recorded his only career triple-double with 10 points, 12 rebounds and 10 blocks in a loss to the Minnesota Timberwolves. He finished the season second in blocks per game behind Serge Ibaka. Sanders also finished third in voting for the NBA Most Improved Player Award, after Paul George and Greivis Vásquez.

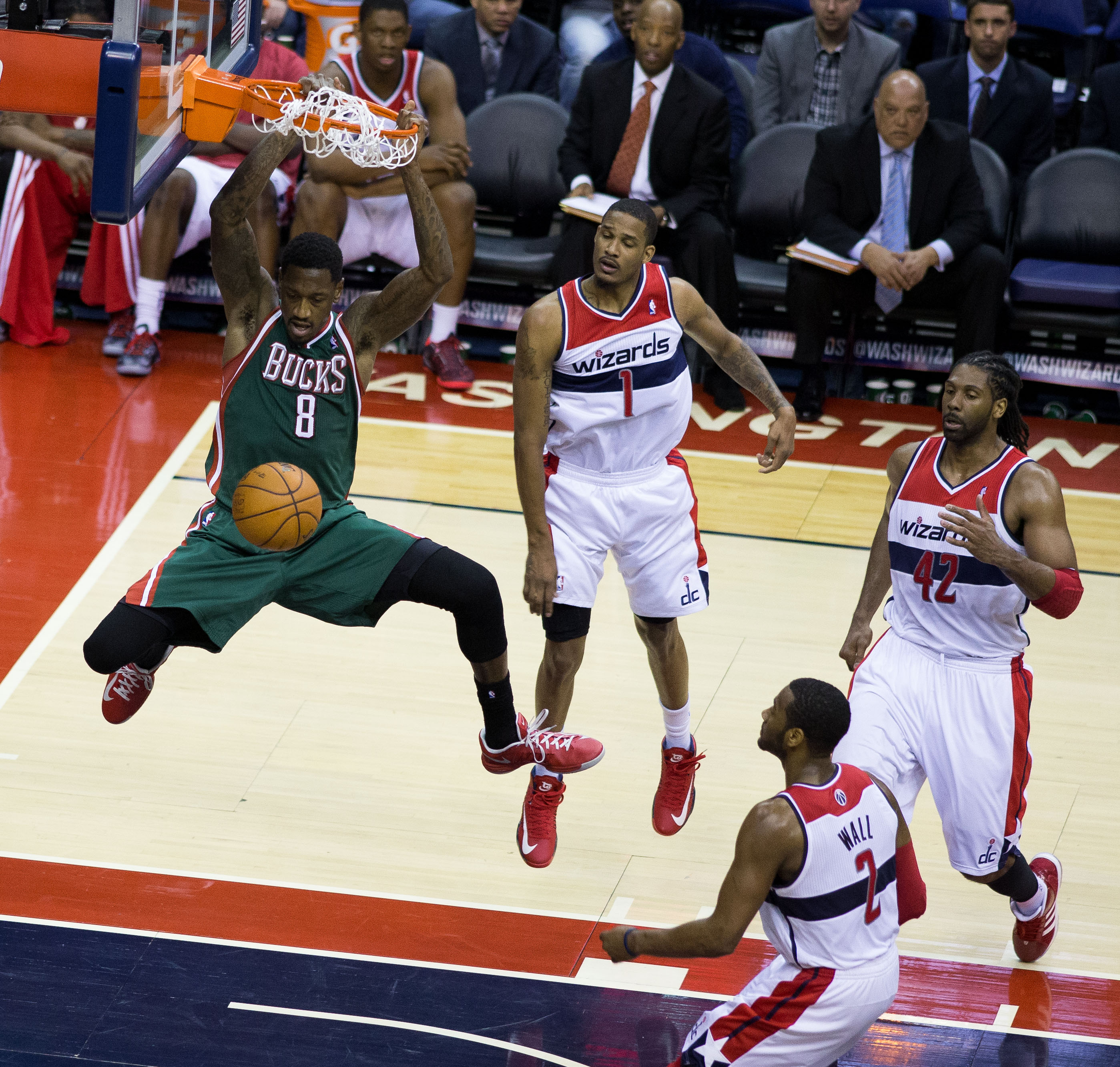
Sanders dunking in a game against the Washington Wizards in March 2013

On August 20, 2013, Sanders signed a four-year, $44 million contract extension with the Bucks. In December 2013, Sanders was sidelined for 25 games after sustaining a torn ligament in his thumb in a night club altercation. Sanders was fined for the two municipal citations of disorderly conduct and assault and battery charges, but law enforcement did not pursue further criminal charges. That same year, he was cited twice for animal cruelty for leaving two German shepherd puppies outside without proper food, water, and shelter.

On March 20, 2014, it was announced that Sanders would miss the rest of the 2013–14 season due to a fractured right orbital bone. On April 4, Sanders was given a five-game suspension for violating the NBA's drug policy after testing positive for marijuana.

In December 2014, Sanders was placed on Bucks' inactive roster for personal reasons. After a seven-game absence, Sanders appeared on the Bucks' bench on January 7, 2015, against the Phoenix Suns, but did not suit up. Rumors emerged that Sanders wanted to leave the sport, all of which were denied by his agent.

Sanders again violated the NBA's drug policy during the 2014–15 season and was subsequently suspended without pay for a minimum of ten games on January 16, 2015. It was announced on February 21, following his second suspension for marijuana use, that the Bucks were buying out Sanders' contract. On February 25, a video of Sanders was released where he explained that he entered into a program at Rogers Memorial Hospital for anxiety, depression, and mood disorders. He said that the program led him to realize "what's important, and where I would want to devote my time and energy" and that ultimately he realized that "for [basketball] to be consuming so much of my life and time right now ... it's not there for me. It's not that worth it." He did, however, claim to still love the game and that "if I get to a point where I feel I'm capable of playing basketball again, then I will."

On January 26, 2017, Sanders announced his decision to return to basketball.

=== Cleveland Cavaliers (2017) ===
On March 13, 2017, Sanders signed with the Cleveland Cavaliers. He made his debut for the Cavaliers the following night in a 128–98 win over the Detroit Pistons. He played the final 1:58 and missed his only shot attempt while recording two fouls. On April 12, Sanders was waived by the Cavaliers after appearing in five games. During his stint with Cleveland, he had multiple assignments with the Canton Charge of the NBA Development League. Sanders reportedly struggled keeping up with responsibilities on and off the court. Sanders later played with 3 Headed Monsters in the 2019 Big3 season.

=== Taoyuan Taiwan Beer Leopards (2024) ===
On August 19, 2024, Sanders signed with the Taoyuan Taiwan Beer Leopards of the Taiwan Professional Basketball League (TPBL). On October 30, the Taoyuan Taiwan Beer Leopards terminated the contract relationship with Sanders.

== Personal life ==
In his time away from basketball, Sanders created an artist collective, clothing line, and non-profit organization named Citizen of Matter. Sanders also worked as a music producer under the moniker L8 Show. Sanders received a placement on PartyNextDoor's second studio album titled PartyNextDoor 3 on a track titled "Don't Run".

== Career statistics ==
Legend
GP	Games played	GS	Games started	MPG	Minutes per game
FG%	Field goal percentage	3P%	3-point field goal percentage	FT%	Free throw percentage
RPG	Rebounds per game	APG	Assists per game	SPG	Steals per game
BPG	Blocks per game	PPG	Points per game	**Bold**	Career high

=== NBA ===
==== Regular season ====
Year	Team	GP	GS	MPG	FG%	3P%	FT%	RPG	APG	SPG	BPG	PPG
2010–11	Milwaukee	60	12	14.5	.433	-	.560	3.0	.3	.4	1.2	4.3
2011–12	Milwaukee	52	0	12.4	.457	.000	.474	3.1	.6	.6	1.5	3.6
2012–13	Milwaukee	**71**	**55**	**27.3**	**.506**	.000	.618	**9.5**	**1.2**	.7	**2.8**	**9.8**
2013–14	Milwaukee	23	20	25.4	.469	.000	.473	7.2	.8	.8	1.7	7.7
2014–15	Milwaukee	27	26	21.7	.500	–	.500	6.1	.9	**1.0**	1.4	7.3
2016–17	Cleveland	5	0	2.6	.250	–	**1.000**	.8	.0	.2	.2	.8
Career		238	113	19.5	.480	.000	.553	5.7	.7	.6	1.8	6.4

==== Playoffs ====
Year	Team	GP	GS	MPG	FG%	3P%	FT%	RPG	APG	SPG	BPG	PPG
2013	Milwaukee	4	4	28.3	.576	–	.455	8.3	1.3	.8	1.3	10.8
Career		4	4	28.3	.576	–	.455	8.3	1.3	.8	1.3	10.8

=== NBA D-League ===
==== Regular season ====
Year	Team	GP	GS	MPG	FG%	3P%	FT%	RPG	APG	SPG	BPG	PPG
2011–12	Fort Wayne	2	**2**	**27.0**	.368	.000	**.778**	**10.0**	.5	**2.0**	**2.5**	**10.5**
2016–17	Canton	**4**	0	19.3	**.370**	–	.364	8.0	**.8**	.0	**2.5**	6.0
Career		6	2	21.8	.370	.000	.550	8.7	.7	.7	2.5	7.5

== See also ==
- List of people banned or suspended by the NBA
