= John Henson (basketball) =

American basketball player (born 1990)

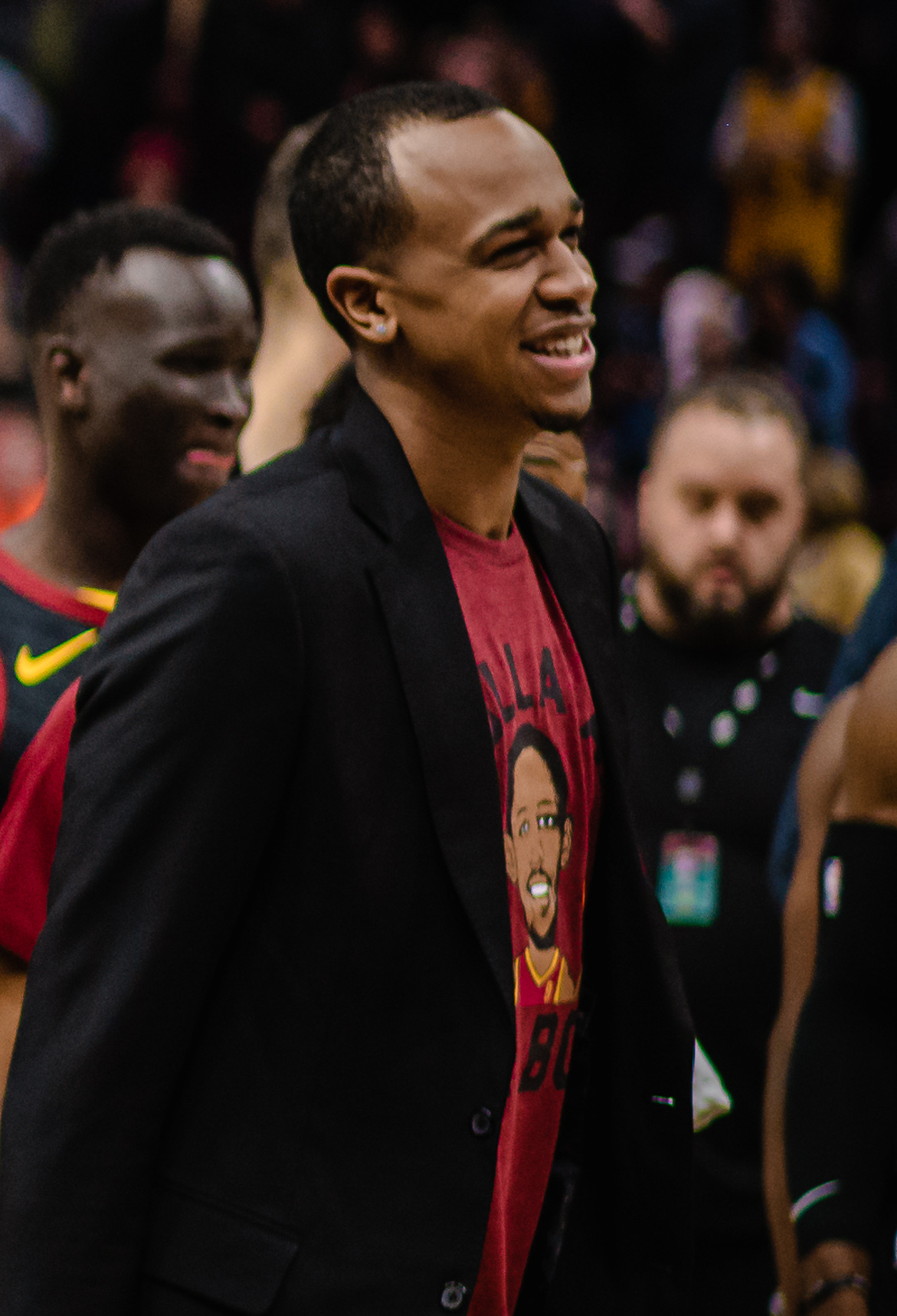
- Henson in 2019

Personal information
- Born: December 28, 1990 (age 35) Greensboro, North Carolina, U.S.
- Listed height: 6 ft 9 in (2.06 m)
- Listed weight: 219 lb (99 kg)

Career information
- High school: Sickles (Tampa, Florida)
- College: North Carolina (2009–2012)
- NBA draft: 2012: 1st round, 14th overall pick
- Drafted by: Milwaukee Bucks
- Playing career: 2012–2020
- Position: Power forward / center
- Number: 31

Career history
- 2012–2018: Milwaukee Bucks
- 2018–2020: Cleveland Cavaliers
- 2020: Detroit Pistons

Career highlights
- 2× ACC Defensive Player of the Year (2011, 2012); First-team All-ACC (2012); Second-team All-ACC (2011); 2x ACC All-Defensive Team (2011, 2012); First-team Parade All-American (2009); McDonald's All-American (2009)
- Stats at NBA.com
- Stats at Basketball Reference

John Allen Henson (born December 28, 1990) is an American former professional basketball player who played eight seasons in the National Basketball Association (NBA). He played college basketball for the North Carolina Tar Heels, where he was a two-time ACC Defensive Player of the Year. Henson was selected with the 14th overall pick in 2012 NBA draft by the Milwaukee Bucks and played his first 6 1/2 seasons with the team before being traded to the Cleveland Cavaliers in December 2018. In February 2020, he was traded to the Detroit Pistons.

== High school career ==
For three years, Henson attended Round Rock High School in Round Rock, Texas. His senior year, Henson transferred to Sickles High School in Tampa, Florida. Henson wore the jersey number 33, averaging 17.6 points, 12.2 rebounds, and 6.1 blocks per game as a senior in 2008–09. He scored a season-high 29 points against Tampa Bay Tech and blocked 10 or more shots five times with a high of 11 on four occasions as a senior as well. Henson led the team to a 24–5 record and a perfect 10–0 league record, but the team lost to Lakeland 48–43 in the regional semi-finals for the Florida FHSAA Class 6A championship. Henson was a first-team all-state selection and Tampa Bay Coaches Association Player of the Year. He played in the McDonald's All-American Game and the Nike Hoop Summit. He also earned first-team Parade All-American honors.

=== Recruiting ===
Henson was a highly sought-after forward and was rated by Scout.com as the #1 power forward and the #4 overall player in the 2009 recruiting class. Analysts predicted he would be an important addition to what some thought would be the best front court in the nation for the 2009–10 season. When asked to evaluate Henson, head coach Roy Williams said Henson had "tremendously long arms" and predicted he would "probably block more shots than any perimeter player in college basketball."

== College career ==
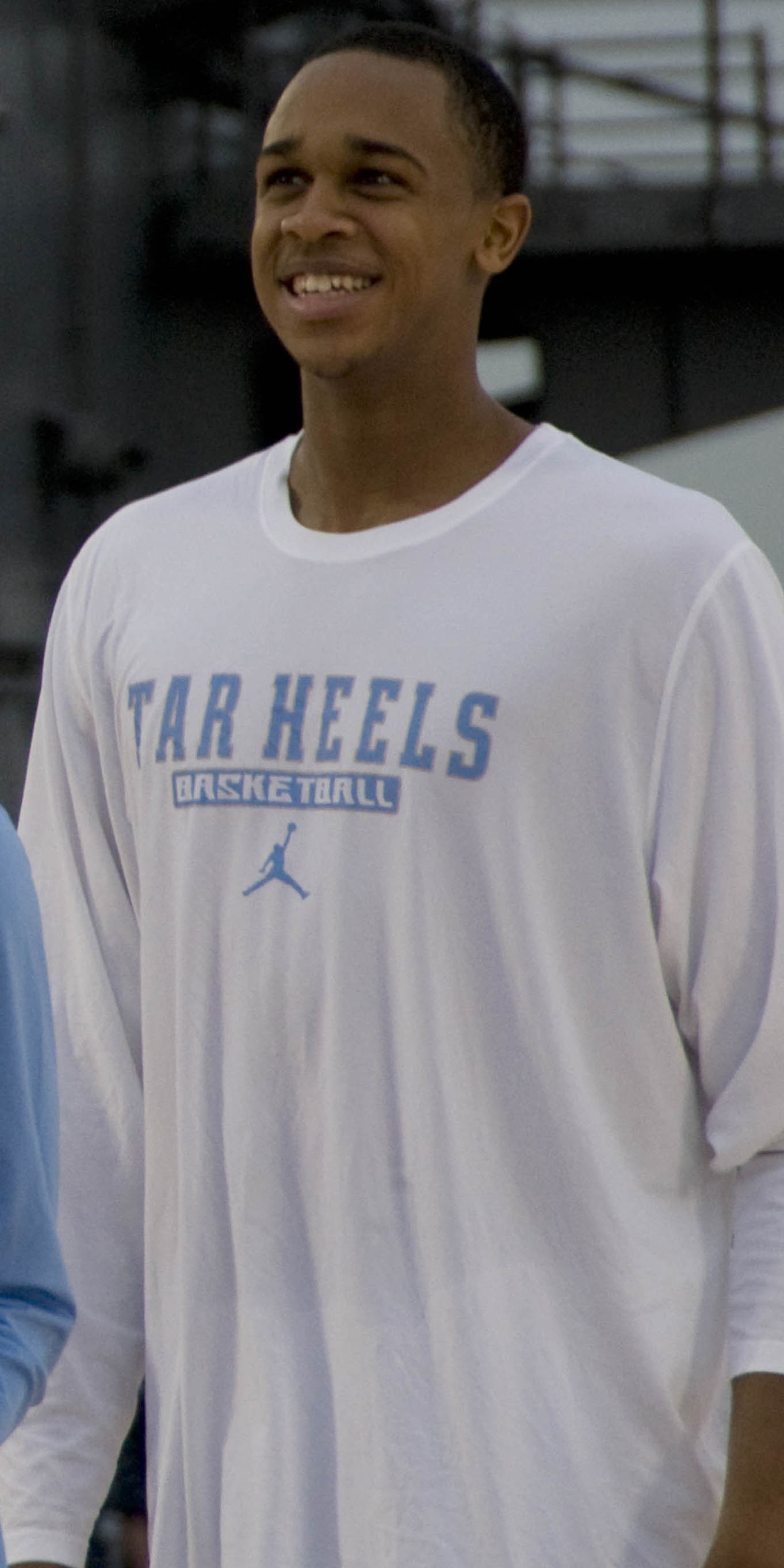
Henson with the Tar Heels in November 2011

At the University of North Carolina at Chapel Hill, Henson began as a small forward for the 2009–10 Tar Heels, but with the season-ending injury to Ed Davis, Henson moved to power forward in mid-February 2010. After the move, Henson's performance improved, and he averaged 9.4 points per game in the last 16 contests of the season. However, the Tar Heels missed the NCAA tournament, losing to the Dayton Flyers in the NIT finals.

As a sophomore in the 2010–11 season, Henson was the winner of the ACC Defensive Player of the Year award for 2011 after averaging 11.7 points, 10.1 rebounds and 3.2 blocks per game. As a junior in 2011–12, he was again named the ACC Defensive Player of the Year after averaging 13.7 points, 9.9 rebounds and 2.9 blocks per game.

On March 29, 2012, he declared for the NBA draft, forgoing his final year of college eligibility.

== Professional career ==
=== Milwaukee Bucks (2012–2018) ===
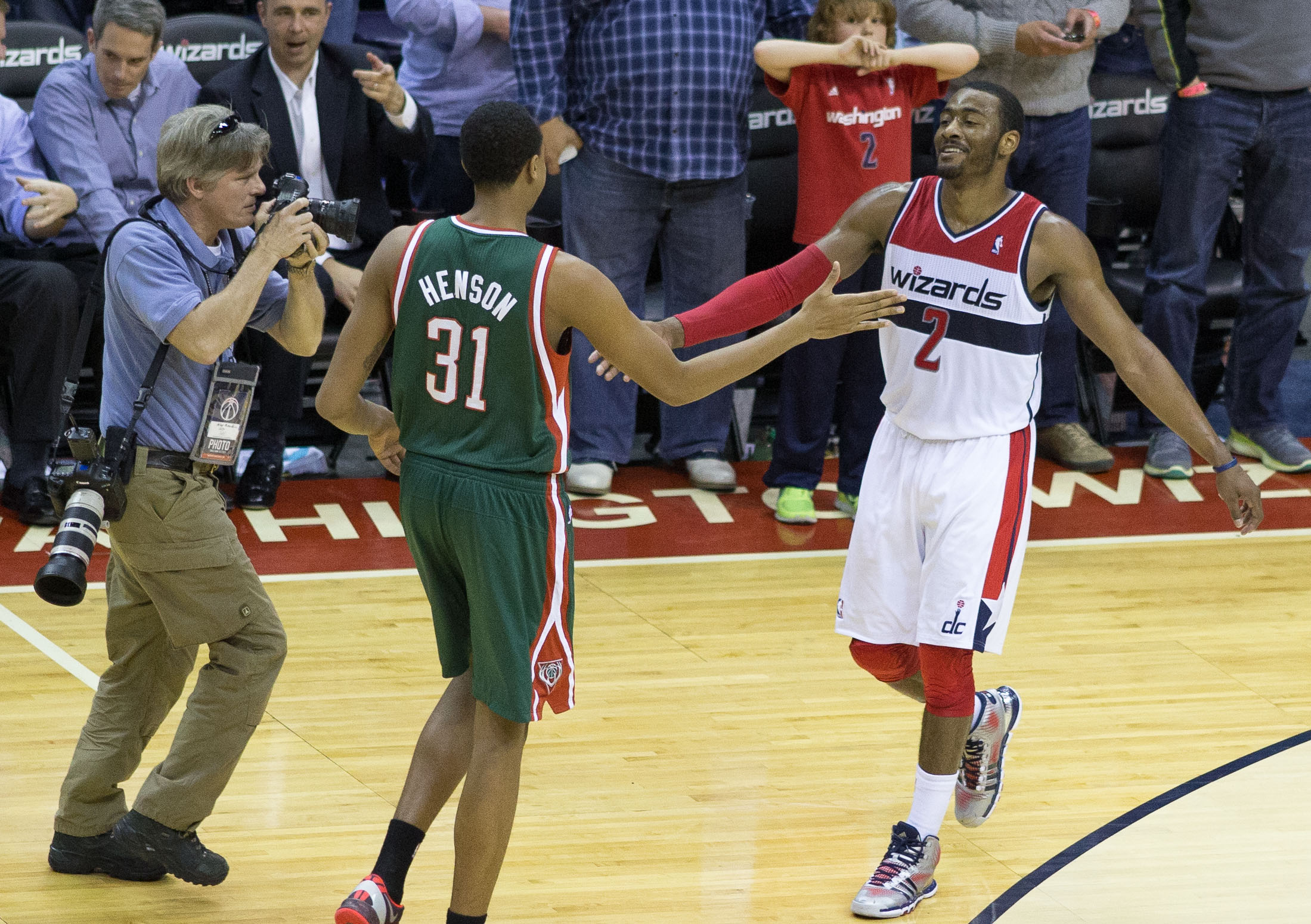
Henson with the Bucks in March 2013, greeting John Wall of the Washington Wizards

On June 28, 2012, Henson was selected with the 14th overall pick in the 2012 NBA draft by the Milwaukee Bucks. On July 10, 2012, he signed his rookie scale contract with the Bucks. On April 10, 2013, he had a season-best game with 17 points, 25 rebounds and seven blocks in a 113–103 loss to the Orlando Magic. A week later, he scored a career-high 28 points in a 95–89 win over the Oklahoma City Thunder.

On October 19, 2013, the Bucks exercised their third-year team option on Henson's rookie scale contract, extending the contract through the 2014–15 season. In 2013–14, he averaged 11.1 points and 7.1 rebounds per game as he came off the bench in 47 of the 70 games he played.

On October 16, 2014, the Bucks exercised their fourth-year team option on Henson's rookie scale contract, extending the contract through the 2015–16 season. Henson played in 67 games for Milwaukee in 2014–15 (11 starts), averaging 7.0 points and 4.7 rebounds per game. He finished fifth in the league for blocks per game with 2.01 and became one of just seven players in Bucks history to average over 2.0 blocks in a single season. Henson blocked at least one shot in 20 straight games from December 26 to February 22, which was the third-longest streak during the 2014–15 season.

On October 2, 2015, Henson signed a four-year, $45 million contract extension with the Bucks. On November 6, 2015, in just his second game of the 2015–16 season, Henson scored a season-high 22 points off the bench in a 99–92 win over the New York Knicks.

On October 29, 2016, Henson hit the game-winning buzzer-beater tip-in against the Brooklyn Nets. In 21 minutes off the bench, he recorded 12 rebounds, seven points, three assists, two steals and two blocks in the 110–108 win. On November 27, 2016, he scored a season-high 20 points in 104–96 win over the Orlando Magic.

On February 4, 2018, Henson had season highs with 19 points and 18 rebounds in a 109–94 win over the Brooklyn Nets.

On November 16, 2018, Henson was ruled out for approximately 12 weeks with a torn left wrist ligament. He underwent surgery on November 28.

=== Cleveland Cavaliers (2018–2020) ===
On December 7, 2018, Henson was traded, along with Matthew Dellavedova and the Bucks 2021 first and second round picks, to the Cleveland Cavaliers in a five-player, three-team deal. The Cavs also received the Washington Wizards 2022 second round pick. The Bucks received George Hill, Jason Smith and a 2021 second round pick. The Wizards received Sam Dekker.

=== Detroit Pistons (2020) ===
On February 6, 2020, the Cavaliers traded Henson, Brandon Knight, and a 2023 second round draft pick to the Detroit Pistons in exchange for Andre Drummond.

On April 5, 2021, the New York Knicks signed Henson to a 10-day contract; however, he did not see action with the team.

On March 8, 2022, Henson signed with Mets de Guaynabo of the Baloncesto Superior Nacional. However, he didn't play any games with them.

On September 11, 2024, Henson announced his retirement.

== Career statistics ==
Legend
GP	Games played	GS	Games started	MPG	Minutes per game
FG%	Field goal percentage	3P%	3-point field goal percentage	FT%	Free throw percentage
RPG	Rebounds per game	APG	Assists per game	SPG	Steals per game
BPG	Blocks per game	PPG	Points per game	**Bold**	Career high

=== NBA ===
==== Regular season ====
Year	Team	GP	GS	MPG	FG%	3P%	FT%	RPG	APG	SPG	BPG	PPG
2012–13	Milwaukee	63	9	13.1	.482	.000	.533	4.7	.5	.3	.7	6.0
2013–14	Milwaukee	70	23	**26.5**	.538	.000	.514	**7.1**	**1.6**	**.6**	1.7	**11.1**
2014–15	Milwaukee	67	11	18.3	.566	—	.569	4.7	.9	.4	**2.0**	7.0
2015–16	Milwaukee	57	1	16.8	.564	.000	.590	3.9	.9	.3	1.9	7.0
2016–17	Milwaukee	58	39	19.4	.515	.000	**.692**	5.1	1.0	.5	1.3	6.8
2017–18	Milwaukee	**76**	**69**	25.9	.572	.143	.570	6.8	1.5	**.6**	1.4	8.8
2018–19	Milwaukee	14	0	13.4	.463	.355	.600	5.1	1.0	.5	.8	5.6
2019–20	Cleveland	29	2	14.2	.508	.194	.515	3.9	1.5	.6	1.1	5.0
2019–20	Detroit	11	6	17.1	**.667**	**.400**	.462	4.4	1.0	.7	.9	6.9
Career		445	160	19.7	.540	.250	.568	5.3	1.1	.5	1.4	7.6

==== Playoffs ====
Year	Team	GP	GS	MPG	FG%	3P%	FT%	RPG	APG	SPG	BPG	PPG
2013	Milwaukee	4	0	8.3	.273	.000	—	2.0	.3	.5	.0	1.5
2015	Milwaukee	**6**	0	25.5	.585	.000	.357	**8.0**	.7	**.8**	1.7	8.8
2017	Milwaukee	2	0	6.0	.250	—	**1.000**	2.0	.0	.5	.0	1.5
2018	Milwaukee	2	**2**	**37.0**	**.692**	—	.500	6.0	**2.5**	.0	**3.5**	**9.5**
Career		14	2	19.4	.536	.000	.412	5.1	.7	.6	1.2	5.8

=== College ===
Year	Team	GP	GS	MPG	FG%	3P%	FT%	RPG	APG	SPG	BPG	PPG
2009–10	North Carolina	**37**	12	15.8	.486	**.222**	.438	4.4	.9	**.7**	1.6	5.7
2010–11	North Carolina	**37**	**36**	26.7	**.500**	.167	.482	**10.1**	.8	.6	**3.2**	11.7
2011–12	North Carolina	35	34	**29.1**	**.500**	–	**.511**	9.9	**1.3**	.6	2.9	**13.7**
Career		109	82	23.8	.497	.208	.484	8.1	1.0	.6	2.5	10.3

== Personal life ==
Henson is the son of Matt and Annette Henson. His father played basketball for Norfolk State University. His sister, Amber, played basketball for Duke University.

Henson is an ambassador for Up2Us Sports, a national non-profit organization dedicated to supporting underserved youth by providing them with coaches trained in positive youth development.
