= 2012–13 Milwaukee Bucks season =

NBA professional basketball team season

- Head coach: Scott Skiles (resigned January 8); Jim Boylan
- General manager: John Hammond
- Owners: Herb Kohl
- Arena: Bradley Center

Results
- Record: 38–44 (.463)
- Place: Division: 3rd (Central); Conference: 8th (Eastern)
- Playoff finish: First Round (lost to Heat 0–4)
- Stats at Basketball Reference

The 2012–13 Milwaukee Bucks season was the Bucks' 45th season in the NBA. The Bucks finished 38-44 and in eighth place in the Eastern Conference in the regular season. They were swept by the eventual back-to-back NBA champion Miami Heat in the first round of the 2013 NBA Playoffs.

== Draft picks ==
Round	Pick	Player	Position	Nationality	College
1	14	John Henson	PF	United States	North Carolina
2	42	Doron Lamb	G	United States	Kentucky

== Roster ==
2012–13 Milwaukee Bucks roster
Players

Pos.	No.	Player	Height	Weight	DOB	From
F/C	19	Gustavo Ayón	6 ft 10 in (2.08 m)	250 lb (113 kg)	1985-04-01	Mexico
C	21	Samuel Dalembert	6 ft 11 in (2.11 m)	250 lb (113 kg)	1981-05-10	Seton Hall
G/F	6	Marquis Daniels	6 ft 6 in (1.98 m)	200 lb (91 kg)	1981–01–07	Auburn
G/F	17	Mike Dunleavy Jr.	6 ft 9 in (2.06 m)	230 lb (104 kg)	1980–09–15	Duke
G	11	Monta Ellis	6 ft 3 in (1.91 m)	185 lb (84 kg)	1985–10–26	Lanier HS (MS)
F/C	0	Drew Gooden	6 ft 10 in (2.08 m)	250 lb (113 kg)	1981–09–24	Kansas
F	31	John Henson	6 ft 11 in (2.11 m)	220 lb (100 kg)	1990–12–28	North Carolina
F	7	Ersan İlyasova	6 ft 10 in (2.08 m)	235 lb (107 kg)	1987–05–15	Turkey
G	3	Brandon Jennings	6 ft 1 in (1.85 m)	169 lb (77 kg)	1989–09–23	Oak Hill Academy (VA)
F	12	Luc Mbah a Moute	6 ft 8 in (2.03 m)	230 lb (104 kg)	1986–09–09	UCLA
C	10	Joel Przybilla	7 ft 1 in (2.16 m)	245 lb (111 kg)	1979–10–10	Minnesota
F/C	8	Larry Sanders	6 ft 11 in (2.11 m)	235 lb (107 kg)	1988–11–21	VCU
SG	5	JJ Redick	6 ft 4 in (1.93 m)	190 lb (86 kg)	1984-06-24	Duke
G	15	Ish Smith	6 ft 0 in (1.83 m)	175 lb (79 kg)	1988-07-05	Wake Forest
F/C	13	Ekpe Udoh	6 ft 10 in (2.08 m)	245 lb (111 kg)	1987–05–20	Baylor

Coaches
Head coach
- Jim Boylan
Assistant(s)
- Joe Wolf
- Anthony Goldwire
- Sidney Moncrief
- Bill Peterson

Legend
- (DP) Unsigned draft pick
- (FA) Free agent
- (S) Suspended
- Injured

== Pre-season ==
2012 pre-season game log
Pre-season: 3–5 (home: 1–3; road: 2–2)

Game	Date	Team	Score	High points	High rebounds	High assists	Location Attendance	Record
1	October 9	@ Cleveland	W 97–80	C. J. Miles (18)	Larry Sanders (8)	Brandon Jennings (7)	Canton Memorial Civic Center; 3,942	1–0
2	October 13	Detroit	W 108–91	Ersan İlyasova (22)	Ersan İlyasova (7)	Brandon Jennings (6)	BMO Harris Bradley Center; 5,213	2–0
3	October 16	@ Chicago	L 94–100	Three players (13)	Samuel Dalembert (10)	Four players (3)	United Center; 21,073	2–1
4	October 18	Memphis	L 94–97	Monta Ellis (20)	Larry Sanders (8)	Beno Udrih (6)	La Crosse Center; 4,314	2–2
5	October 20	Washington	L 94–102	Monta Ellis (19)	Ersan İlyasova (8)	Monta Ellis (8)	BMO Harris Bradley Center; 9,967	2–3
6	October 22	@ Toronto	L 95–104	Monta Ellis (26)	Samuel Dalembert (11)	Brandon Jennings (10)	Air Canada Centre; 11,364	2–4
7	October 25	@ Charlotte	W 100–90	Tobias Harris (18)	Larry Sanders (13)	Ersan İlyasova, Beno Udrih (6)	Time Warner Cable Arena; 19,077	3–4
8	October 26	Minnesota	L 76–100	Brandon Jennings (19)	Ersan İlyasova (6)	Four players (3)	Resch Center; 4,165	3–5

2012–13 season schedule

== Regular season ==
=== Game log ===
2012–13 game log
Total: 38–44 (home: 21–20; road: 17–24)
November: 7–7 (home: 3–4; road: 4–3)

Game	Date	Team	Score	High points	High rebounds	High assists	Location Attendance	Record
1	November 2	@ Boston	W 99–88	Brandon Jennings (21)	Ersan İlyasova (11)	Brandon Jennings (13)	TD Garden; 18,624	1–0
2	November 3	Cleveland	W 105–102	Mike Dunleavy Jr. (29)	Mike Dunleavy Jr. (12)	Brandon Jennings (13)	BMO Harris Bradley Center; 17,086	2–0
3	November 7	Memphis	L 90–108	Brandon Jennings (19)	Larry Sanders (11)	Monta Ellis (7)	BMO Harris Bradley Center; 11,465	2–1
4	November 9	@ Washington	W 101–91	Monta Ellis (22)	Dunleavy & Sanders (9)	Brandon Jennings (7)	Verizon Center; 14,531	3–1
5	November 10	Boston	L 92–96	Monta Ellis (32)	Larry Sanders (12)	Monta Ellis (8)	BMO Harris Bradley Center; 14,589	3–2
6	November 12	@ Philadelphia	W 105–96	Brandon Jennings (33)	Larry Sanders (9)	Brandon Jennings (8)	Wells Fargo Center; 15,086	4–2
7	November 14	Indiana	W 99–85	Ellis & Jennings (16)	Ekpe Udoh (7)	Beno Udrih (10)	BMO Harris Bradley Center; 11,573	5–2
8	November 17	New Orleans	W 117–113	Ellis & Jennings (22)	Mike Dunleavy Jr. (9)	Ellis & Jennings (9)	BMO Harris Bradley Center; 14,731	6–2
9	November 19	@ Charlotte	L 98–102	Monta Ellis (31)	Ekpe Udoh (6)	Beno Udrih (7)	Time Warner Cable Arena; 11,248	6–3
10	November 21	@ Miami	L 106–113	Brandon Jennings (19)	John Henson (18)	Brandon Jennings (6)	American Airlines Arena; 19,971	6–4
11	November 24	Chicago	L 86–93	Brandon Jennings (23)	Sanders & Udoh (8)	Brandon Jennings (7)	BMO Harris Bradley Center; 14,812	6–5
12	November 26	@ Chicago	W 93–92	Ersan İlyasova (18)	Ilyasova, Sanders, & Udoh (6)	Beno Udrih (6)	United Center; 21,485	7–5
13	November 28	New York	L 88–102	Jennings & Udrih (18)	Mike Dunleavy Jr. (9)	Monta Ellis (7)	BMO Harris Bradley Center; 11,439	7–6
14	November 30	@ Minnesota	L 85–95	Ellis & Jennings (18)	Larry Sanders (12)	Brandon Jennings (4)	BMO Harris Bradley Center; 16,418	7-7

December: 9–6 (home: 6–2; road: 3–4)

Game	Date	Team	Score	High points	High rebounds	High assists	Location Attendance	Record
15	December 1	Boston	W 91–88	Larry Sanders (18)	Larry Sanders (16)	Monta Ellis (7)	BMO Harris Bradley Center; 16,581	8–7
16	December 3	@ New Orleans	L 81–102	Brandon Jennings (25)	Luc Richard Mbah a Moute (8)	Monta Ellis (6)	New Orleans Arena; 12,321	8-8
17	December 5	@ San Antonio	L 99–110	Monta Ellis (21)	Ellis & Sanders (7)	Monta Ellis (11)	AT&T Center; 18,349	8–9
18	December 7	Charlotte	W 108–93	Ersan İlyasova (21)	Ersan İlyasova (12)	Brandon Jennings (8)	BMO Harris Bradley Center; 13,371	9-9
19	December 9	@ Brooklyn	W 97–88	Brandon Jennings (26)	Marquis Daniels (7)	Brandon Jennings (7)	Barclays Center; 16,390	10–9
20	December 12	Sacramento	W 98–85	Brandon Jennings (19)	Ersan İlyasova (14)	Monta Ellis (11)	BMO Harris Bradley Center; 11,491	11–9
21	December 14	@ Cleveland	W 90–86	Monta Ellis (33)	Larry Sanders (10)	Brandon Jennings (8)	Quicken Loans Arena; 14,146	12–9
22	December 15	L. A. Clippers	L 85–111	Marquis Daniels (16)	Luc Richard Mbah a Moute (6)	Monta Ellis (4)	BMO Harris Bradley Center; 13,691	12–10
23	December 18	Indiana	W 98–93	Brandon Jennings (34)	Luc Richard Mbah a Moute (10)	Ellis & Jennings (6)	BMO Harris Bradley Center; 11,739	13–10
24	December 19	@ Memphis	L 80–90	Brandon Jennings (26)	Larry Sanders (9)	Mike Dunleavy Jr. (3)	FedExForum; 16,007	13–11
25	December 21	@ Boston	W 99–94	Monta Ellis (27)	Larry Sanders (20)	Brandon Jennings (8)	TD Garden; 18,624	14–11
26	December 22	Cleveland	L 82–94	Monta Ellis (37)	Larry Sanders (12)	Dunleavy & Mbah a Moute (4)	BMO Harris Bradley Center; 14,176	14–12
27	December 26	Brooklyn	W 108–93	Brandon Jennings (25)	Larry Sanders (12)	Monta Ellis (7)	BMO Harris Bradley Center; 13,102	15–12
28	December 29	Miami	W 104–85	Brandon Jennings (25)	Larry Sanders (11)	Monta Ellis (9)	BMO Harris Bradley Center; 18,717	16–12
29	December 30	@ Detroit	W 96–94	Monta Ellis (30)	Daniels & Jennings (6)	Monta Ellis (9)	The Palace of Auburn Hills; 14,219	16–13

January: 8–7 (home: 3–4; road: 5–3)

Game	Date	Team	Score	High points	High rebounds	High assists	Location Attendance	Record
30	January 2	San Antonio	L 110–117	Brandon Jennings (31)	Ersan İlyasova (10)	Monta Ellis (8)	BMO Harris Bradley Center; 15,084	16–14
31	January 4	Houston	L 101–115	Brandon Jennings (16)	John Henson (15)	Ellis & Jennings (7)	BMO Harris Bradley Center; 15,867	16–15
32	January 5	@ Indiana	L 80–95	Monta Ellis (21)	John Henson (13)	Jennings & Udrih (5)	Bankers Life Fieldhouse; 15,329	16-16
33	January 8	Phoenix	W 108–99	Brandon Jennings (29)	John Henson (11)	Brandon Jennings (9)	BMO Harris Bradley Center; 13,014	17–16
34	January 9	@ Chicago	W 104–96	Brandon Jennings (35)	Larry Sanders (12)	Brandon Jennings (6)	United Center; 21,570	18–16
35	January 11	Detroit	L 87–103	Jennings & Udrih (15)	Samuel Dalembert (7)	Monta Ellis (5)	BMO Harris Bradley Center; 15,681	18–17
36	January 13	@ Toronto	W 107–96	Henson & Jennings (19)	Larry Sanders (8)	Brandon Jennings (10)	Air Canada Centre; 17,384	19–17
37	January 15	@ L. A. Lakers	L 88–104	Monta Ellis (17)	Larry Sanders (11)	Beno Udrih (7)	Staples Center; 18,997	19–18
38	January 17	@ Phoenix	W 98–94	Monta Ellis (24)	Larry Sanders (15)	Ellis & Udrih (6)	US Airways Center; 15,963	20–18
39	January 19	@ Portland	W 110–104	Brandon Jennings (30)	Ersan İlyasova (14)	Brandon Jennings (8)	Rose Garden; 20,487	21–18
40	January 22	Philadelphia	W 110–102	Ersan İlyasova (27)	Ersan İlyasova (16)	Monta Ellis (10)	BMO Harris Bradley Center; 13,080	22–18
41	January 25	@ Cleveland	L 108–113	Ersan İlyasova (30)	Larry Sanders (11)	Brandon Jennings (12)	Quicken Loans Arena; 15,098	22–19
42	January 26	Golden State	W 109–102	Ellis & Jennings (20)	Ersan İlyasova (12)	Brandon Jennings (7)	BMO Harris Bradley Center; 16,937	23–19
43	January 29	@ Detroit	W 117–90	Brandon Jennings (30)	Samuel Dalembert (10)	Beno Udrih (11)	The Palace of Auburn Hills; 15,479	24–19
44	January 30	Chicago	L 88–104	Ersan İlyasova (18)	Samuel Dalembert (13)	Brandon Jennings (8)	BMO Harris Bradley Center; 17,640	24–20

February: 4–8 (home: 2–4; road: 2–4)

Game	Date	Team	Score	High points	High rebounds	High assists	Location Attendance	Record
45	February 1	@ New York	L 86–96	Ersan İlyasova (19)	Larry Sanders (10)	Brandon Jennings (6)	Madison Square Garden; 19,033	24–21
46	February 2	Orlando	W 107–98	Monta Ellis (21)	Larry Sanders (13)	Monta Ellis (11)	BMO Harris Bradley Center; 14,321	25–21
47	February 5	@ Denver	L 104–112	Samuel Dalembert (35)	Samuel Dalembert (12)	Brandon Jennings (10)	Pepsi Center; 15,272	25–22
48	February 6	@ Utah	L 86–100	Ilyasova & Jennings (17)	Samuel Dalembert (11)	Monta Ellis (5)	EnergySolutions Arena; 18,571	25–23
49	February 9	Detroit	L 100–105	Brandon Jennings (26)	Samuel Dalembert (12)	Brandon Jennings (7)	BMO Harris Bradley Center; 15,511	25–24
50	February 11	Washington	L 90–102	Monta Ellis (24)	Ersan İlyasova (9)	Monta Ellis (8)	BMO Harris Bradley Center; 13,842	25-25
51	February 13	Philadelphia	W 94–92	Monta Ellis (27)	Samuel Dalembert (14)	Ellis & Jennings (5)	BMO Harris Bradley Center; 15,114	26–25
All-Star Break
52	February 19	@ Brooklyn	L 111–113	Brandon Jennings (34)	Ersan İlyasova (9)	Monta Ellis (8)	Barclays Center; 17,334	26-26
53	February 20	Brooklyn	L 94–97	Brandon Jennings (31)	Larry Sanders (13)	Brandon Jennings (11)	BMO Harris Bradley Center; 14,563	26–27
54	February 23	Atlanta	L 102–103	Ersan İlyasova (19)	Larry Sanders (19)	Monta Ellis (10)	BMO Harris Bradley Center; 18,289	26–28
55	February 26	@ Dallas	W 95–90	Monta Ellis (22)	Larry Sanders (13)	Monta Ellis (9)	American Airlines Center; 19,870	27–28
56	February 27	@ Houston	W 110–107	Monta Ellis (27)	Ersan İlyasova (10)	Monta Ellis (13)	Toyota Center; 15,463	28-28

March: 7–9 (home: 5–4; road: 2–5)

Game	Date	Team	Score	High points	High rebounds	High assists	Location Attendance	Record
57	March 2	Toronto	W 122–114 (OT)	Ersan İlyasova (29)	Larry Sanders (12)	Brandon Jennings (19)	BMO Harris Bradley Center; 16,165	29–28
58	March 4	Utah	W 109–108 (OT)	Monta Ellis (34)	Larry Sanders (16)	Brandon Jennings (17)	BMO Harris Bradley Center; 13,926	30–28
59	March 6	@ L. A. Clippers	L 101–117	Monta Ellis (22)	Henson & Sanders (7)	Brandon Jennings (12)	Staples Center; 19,060	30–29
60	March 9	@ Golden State	W 103–93	Brandon Jennings (31)	Larry Sanders (9)	Brandon Jennings (10)	Oracle Arena; 19,596	31–29
61	March 10	@ Sacramento	W 115–113	Monta Ellis (29)	Samuel Dalembert (11)	Monta Ellis (9)	Power Balance Pavilion; 14,761	32–29
62	March 12	Dallas	L 108–115	Monta Ellis (32)	Larry Sanders (12)	Monta Ellis (9)	BMO Harris Bradley Center; 14,154	32–30
63	March 13	@ Washington	L 93–106	Monta Ellis (26)	Ersan İlyasova (12)	Brandon Jennings (10)	Verizon Center; 14,506	32–31
64	March 15	Miami	L 94–107	Ersan İlyasova (26)	Ersan İlyasova (17)	Monta Ellis (7)	BMO Harris Bradley Center; 18,717	32-32
65	March 17	Orlando	W 115–109	Monta Ellis (39)	Ersan İlyasova (11)	Brandon Jennings (14)	BMO Harris Bradley Center; 15,591	33–32
66	March 19	Portland	W 102–95	Brandon Jennings (24)	Larry Sanders (13)	Monta Ellis (8)	BMO Harris Bradley Center; 14,397	34–32
67	March 20	@ Atlanta	L 90–98	Brandon Jennings (21)	Larry Sanders (14)	JJ Redick (6)	Philips Arena; 11,920	34–33
68	March 22	@ Indiana	L 78–102	Monta Ellis (22)	Samuel Dalembert (13)	Monta Ellis (6)	Bankers Life Fieldhouse; 18,165	34-34
69	March 24	Atlanta	L 99–104	Monta Ellis (20)	Larry Sanders (12)	Brandon Jennings (13)	BMO Harris Bradley Center; 17,587	34–35
70	March 27	@ Philadelphia	L 92–100	Monta Ellis (29)	Ersan İlyasova (18)	Monta Ellis (7)	Wells Fargo Center; 16,640	34–36
71	March 28	L. A. Lakers	W 113–103	Larry Sanders (21)	Larry Sanders (13)	Monta Ellis (9)	BMO Harris Bradley Center; 16,884	35–36
72	March 30	Oklahoma City	L 99–109	Ersan İlyasova (29)	Ersan İlyasova (14)	Monta Ellis (7)	BMO Harris Bradley Center; 17,578	35–37

April: 3–7 (home: 2–2; road: 1–5)

Game	Date	Team	Score	High points	High rebounds	High assists	Location Attendance	Record
73	April 1	Charlotte	W 131–102	Larry Sanders (24)	Larry Sanders (13)	Monta Ellis (14)	BMO Harris Bradley Center; 15,315	36–37
74	April 3	Minnesota	L 98–107	Ersan İlyasova (29)	Ersan İlyasova (12)	Brandon Jennings (8)	BMO Harris Bradley Center; 15,386	36–38
75	April 5	@ New York	L 83–101	Brandon Jennings (25)	Larry Sanders (12)	Monta Ellis (6)	Madison Square Garden; 19,033	36–39
76	April 6	Toronto	W 100–83	Monta Ellis (22)	Larry Sanders (9)	Monta Ellis (9)	BMO Harris Bradley Center; 16,746	37–39
77	April 9	@ Miami	L 83–94	Brandon Jennings (30)	Larry Sanders (9)	Brandon Jennings (4)	American Airlines Arena; 19,834	37–40
78	April 10	@ Orlando	L 103–113 (OT)	Monta Ellis (21)	John Henson (25)	Monta Ellis (11)	Amway Center; 17,127	37–41
79	April 12	@ Atlanta	L 104–109	Monta Ellis (27)	Ekpe Udoh (9)	Monta Ellis (17)	Philips Arena; 16,908	37–42
80	April 13	@ Charlotte	L 85–95	Mike Dunleavy Jr. (19)	John Henson (11)	Ish Smith (7)	Time Warner Cable Arena; 14,680	37–43
81	April 15	Denver	L 111–112	Monta Ellis (38)	John Henson (15)	Ish Smith (6)	BMO Harris Bradley Center; 16,517	37–44
82	April 17	@ Oklahoma City	W 95–89	John Henson (28)	John Henson (16)	Ish Smith (5)	Chesapeake Energy Arena; 18,203	38–44

2012–13 season schedule

=== Standings ===
Central Division	W	L	PCT	GB	Home	Road	Div	GP
y-Indiana Pacers	49	32	.605	–	30–11	19–21	13–3	81†
x-Chicago Bulls	45	37	.549	4.5	24–17	21–20	9–7	82
x-Milwaukee Bucks	38	44	.463	11.5	21–20	17–24	7–9	82
Detroit Pistons	29	53	.354	20.5	18–23	11–30	8–8	82
Cleveland Cavaliers	24	58	.293	25.5	14–27	10–31	3–13	82

Eastern Conference
#	Team	W	L	PCT	GB	GP
1	z-Miami Heat *	66	16	.805	–	82
2	y-New York Knicks *	54	28	.659	12.0	82
3	y-Indiana Pacers *	49	32	.605	16.5	81
4	x-Brooklyn Nets	49	33	.598	17.0	82
5	x-Chicago Bulls	45	37	.549	21.0	82
6	x-Atlanta Hawks	44	38	.537	22.0	82
7	x-Boston Celtics	41	40	.506	24.5	81
8	x-Milwaukee Bucks	38	44	.463	28.0	82
9	Philadelphia 76ers	34	48	.415	32.0	82
10	Toronto Raptors	34	48	.415	32.0	82
11	Washington Wizards	29	53	.354	37.0	82
12	Detroit Pistons	29	53	.354	37.0	82
13	Cleveland Cavaliers	24	58	.293	42.0	82
14	Charlotte Bobcats	21	61	.256	45.0	82
15	Orlando Magic	20	62	.244	46.0	82

== Playoffs ==
2013 playoff game log
First Round: 0–4 (home: 0–2; road: 0–2)

Game	Date	Team	Score	High points	High rebounds	High assists	Location Attendance	Series
1	April 21	@ Miami	L 87–110	Brandon Jennings (26)	Ersan İlyasova (6)	Monta Ellis & JJ Redick (3)	American Airlines Arena; 20,006	0–1
2	April 23	@ Miami	L 86–98	Ersan İlyasova (21)	Mike Dunleavy Jr., Ersan İlyasova, & Larry Sanders (6)	Mike Dunleavy Jr., Monta Ellis, & Brandon Jennings (5)	American Airlines Arena; 20,097	0–2
3	April 25	Miami	L 91–104	Brandon Jennings & Larry Sanders (16)	Larry Sanders (11)	Brandon Jennings (8)	BMO Harris Bradley Center; 18,165	0–3
4	April 28	Miami	L 77–88	Monta Ellis (21)	Larry Sanders (11)	Monta Ellis (8)	BMO Harris Bradley Center; 18,717	0–4

2013 playoff schedule

== Player statistics ==
Legend
GP	Games played	GS	Games started	MPG	Minutes per game
FG%	Field-goal percentage	3P%	3-point field-goal percentage	FT%	Free-throw percentage
RPG	Rebounds per game	APG	Assists per game	SPG	Steals per game
BPG	Blocks per game	PPG	Points per game

=== Regular season ===
Milwaukee Bucks statistics
Player	GP	GS	MPG	FG%	3P%	FT%	RPG	APG	SPG	BPG	PPG
Monta Ellis	82	82	37.5	.416	.287	.773	3.9	6.0	2.1	.4	19.2
Brandon Jennings	80	80	36.2	.399	.375	.819	3.1	6.5	1.6	.1	17.5
Ekpe Udoh	76	9	17.3	.435	.000	.748	3.3	.6	.5	1.1	4.3
Mike Dunleavy Jr.	75	3	25.9	.442	.428	.820	3.9	1.9	.5	.5	10.5
Ersan İlyasova	73	54	27.6	.462	.444	.796	7.1	1.6	.9	.5	13.2
Larry Sanders	71	55	27.3	.506	.000	.618	9.5	1.2	.7	2.8	9.8
John Henson	63	9	13.1	.482	.000	.533	4.7	.5	.3	.7	6.0
Marquis Daniels	59	33	18.4	.376	.278	.741	2.5	1.1	.9	.2	5.5
Luc Mbah a Moute	58	45	22.9	.401	.351	.571	4.4	.9	.7	.2	6.7
Samuel Dalembert	47	23	16.3	.542	1.000	.691	5.9	.4	.4	1.1	6.7
Beno Udrih^{†}	39	0	18.4	.475	.265	.727	2.0	3.5	.4	.1	6.7
Tobias Harris^{†}	28	14	11.6	.461	.333	.885	2.0	.5	.3	.3	4.9
JJ Redick^{†}	28	2	28.7	.403	.318	.918	1.9	2.7	.3	.1	12.3
Doron Lamb^{†}	23	0	12.2	.347	.250	.533	.7	.9	.3	.0	3.4
Drew Gooden	16	0	9.4	.328	.200	.688	1.9	.4	.3	.4	3.3
Ish Smith^{†}	16	0	8.6	.395	.400		.9	1.9	.5	.2	2.4
Joel Przybilla	12	1	5.7	.250		.000	1.8	.3	.1	.2	.2
Gustavo Ayón^{†}	12	0	13.6	.595		.083	4.9	1.0	.8	.3	4.3

=== Playoffs ===
Milwaukee Bucks statistics
Player	GP	GS	MPG	FG%	3P%	FT%	RPG	APG	SPG	BPG	PPG
Monta Ellis	4	4	38.0	.436	.158	.375	3.3	5.5	2.5	.3	14.3
Luc Mbah a Moute	4	4	34.0	.435	.000	.722	3.5	1.8	1.0	.0	8.3
Brandon Jennings	4	4	33.3	.298	.214	.722	2.3	4.0	2.3	.3	13.3
Ersan İlyasova	4	4	29.3	.435	.400	1.000	7.3	1.8	1.3	.3	11.5
Larry Sanders	4	4	28.3	.576		.455	8.3	1.3	.8	1.3	10.8
Mike Dunleavy Jr.	4	0	22.8	.567	.438	.889	4.0	2.0	.5	.0	12.3
JJ Redick	4	0	17.3	.440	.333	1.000	.8	1.3	.3	.0	7.3
Ekpe Udoh	4	0	13.5	.444			1.5	.3	.5	.5	2.0
John Henson	4	0	8.3	.273	.000		2.0	.3	.5	.0	1.5
Ish Smith	4	0	2.8	.000			.3	.8	.0	.0	.0
Marquis Daniels	3	0	11.0	.545	.000		1.3	1.3	.3	.0	4.0
Gustavo Ayón	3	0	2.3	.500			.0	.0	.0	.0	1.3
Samuel Dalembert	1	0	9.0	.000		.250	3.0	.0	1.0	.0	1.0

- ^{†} Denotes player spent time with another team in the season. Stats reflect time with the Bucks only.

== Transactions ==
=== Overview ===
Players Added

Via draft

- John Henson
- Doron Lamb

Via trade

- Samuel Dalembert
- JJ Redick
- Gustavo Ayon
- Ish Smith

Via free agency

- Marquis Daniels
- Mustapha Farrakhan
- Eddie Gill
- Orien Greene
- Joel Przybilla
- Alando Tucker
Players Lost

Via trade

- Jon Brockman
- Jon Leuer
- Shaun Livingston
- Tobias Harris
- Beno Udrih
- Doron Lamb

Via free agency

- Kwame Brown
- Carlos Delfino

=== Trades ===
June 26, 2012	To Milwaukee Bucks Samuel Dalembert; The 14th pick in 2012; Future second-round pick Cash considerations	To Houston Rockets Jon Brockman; Jon Leuer; Shaun Livingston; The 12th pick in 2012

February 21, 2013	To Milwaukee Bucks JJ Redick; Gustavo Ayon; Ish Smith	To Orlando Magic Tobias Harris; Beno Udrih; Doron Lamb

=== Free agents ===
Additions
Player	Date signed	Former team
Ersan İlyasova	July 12, 2012	Milwaukee Bucks (re-signed)
Joel Przybilla	August 9, 2012	Portland Trail Blazers
Marquis Daniels	September 25, 2012	Boston Celtics
Alando Tucker	October 1, 2012	Texas Legends (D-League)
Marquis Daniels	October 1	Townsville Crocodiles (Australia)
Orien Greene	October 1	Los Angeles D-Fenders (D-League)
Mustapha Farrakhan	October 1	Bakersfield Jam (D-League)

Subtractions
Player	Reason Left	New team
Kwame Brown	Free Agency	Philadelphia 76ers
Carlos Delfino	Free Agency	Houston Rockets

== See also ==
- 2012–13 NBA season
