= 2012–13 Miami Heat season =

NBA team season (won NBA championship)

- NBA champions
- Conference champions
- Division champions
- Head coach: Erik Spoelstra
- President: Pat Riley
- Owner: Micky Arison
- Arena: American Airlines Arena

Results
- Record: 66–16 (.805)
- Place: Division: 1st (Southeast); Conference: 1st (Eastern)
- Playoff finish: NBA champions (Defeated Spurs 4–3)
- Stats at Basketball Reference

Local media
- Television: Sun Sports
- Radio: 790 The Ticket

The 2012–13 Miami Heat season was the franchise's 25th season in the National Basketball Association (NBA). They came into the season as the defending NBA champions, back-to-back Eastern Conference champions, the first season playing with the "Big 4" of LeBron James, Dwyane Wade, Chris Bosh, and Ray Allen, and the fifth season under head coach Erik Spoelstra.

During the season, the Heat embarked on a 27-game winning streak, which at the time ranked as the second longest winning streak in NBA history, and finished with a 66–16 record, the best record with the Big Three and a franchise best. James, Wade and Bosh were all selected for the 2013 NBA All-Star Game, while James won his fourth NBA Most Valuable Player Award at the end of the season, just one vote shy of winning the award unanimously.

On June 3, 2013, the Heat defeated the Indiana Pacers in game seven of the Eastern Conference Finals to become the first team since the Chicago Bulls in 1998 to three-peat as Eastern Conference champions. The Heat then defeated the San Antonio Spurs in an NBA Finals that went the full seven games, in effect handing the Spurs their first loss in the NBA Finals, and with this victory in the NBA Finals, it echoed the 1997–98 Bulls, as they had also been the last Eastern Conference team to repeat as NBA champions.

== Key dates ==
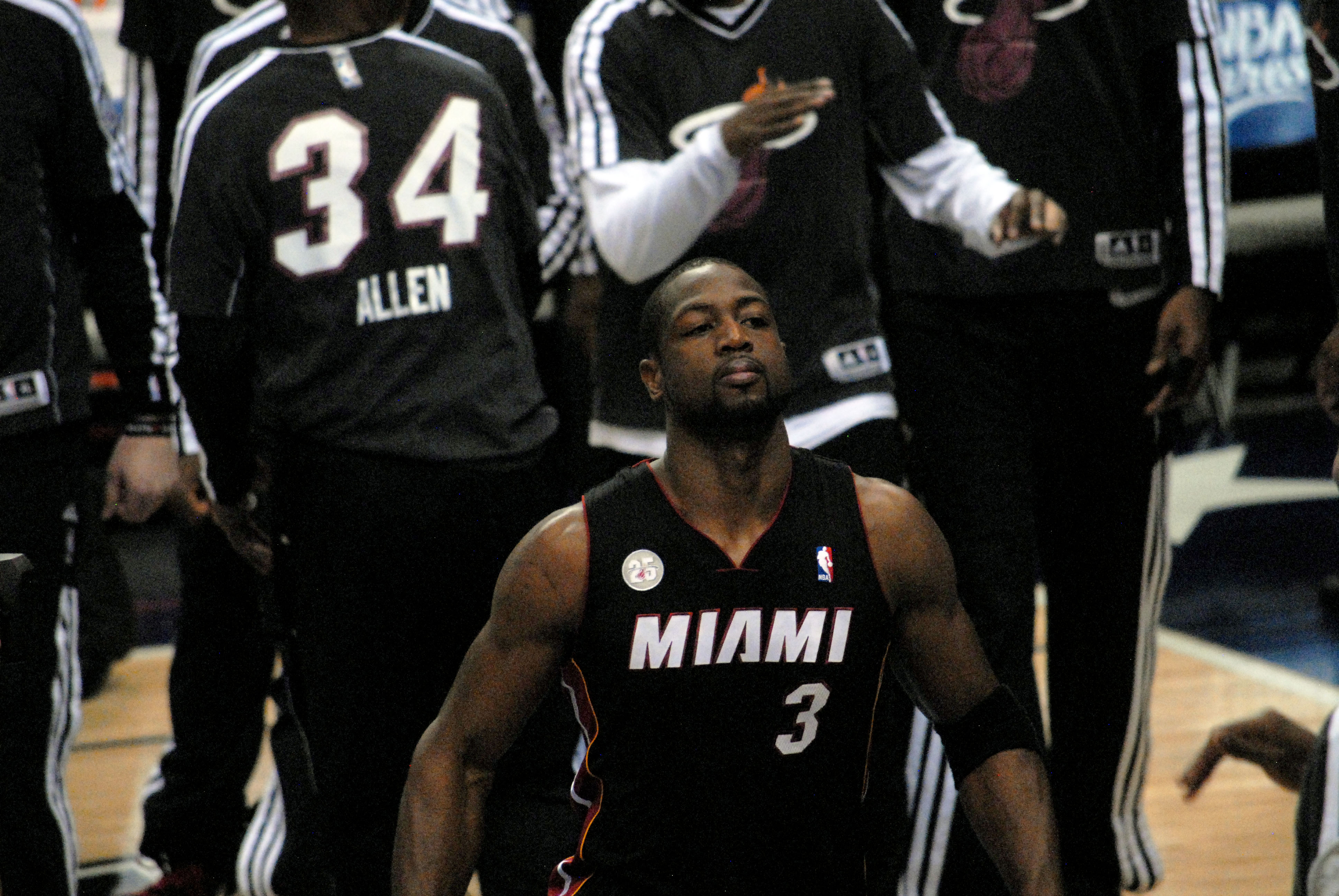
Dwyane Wade

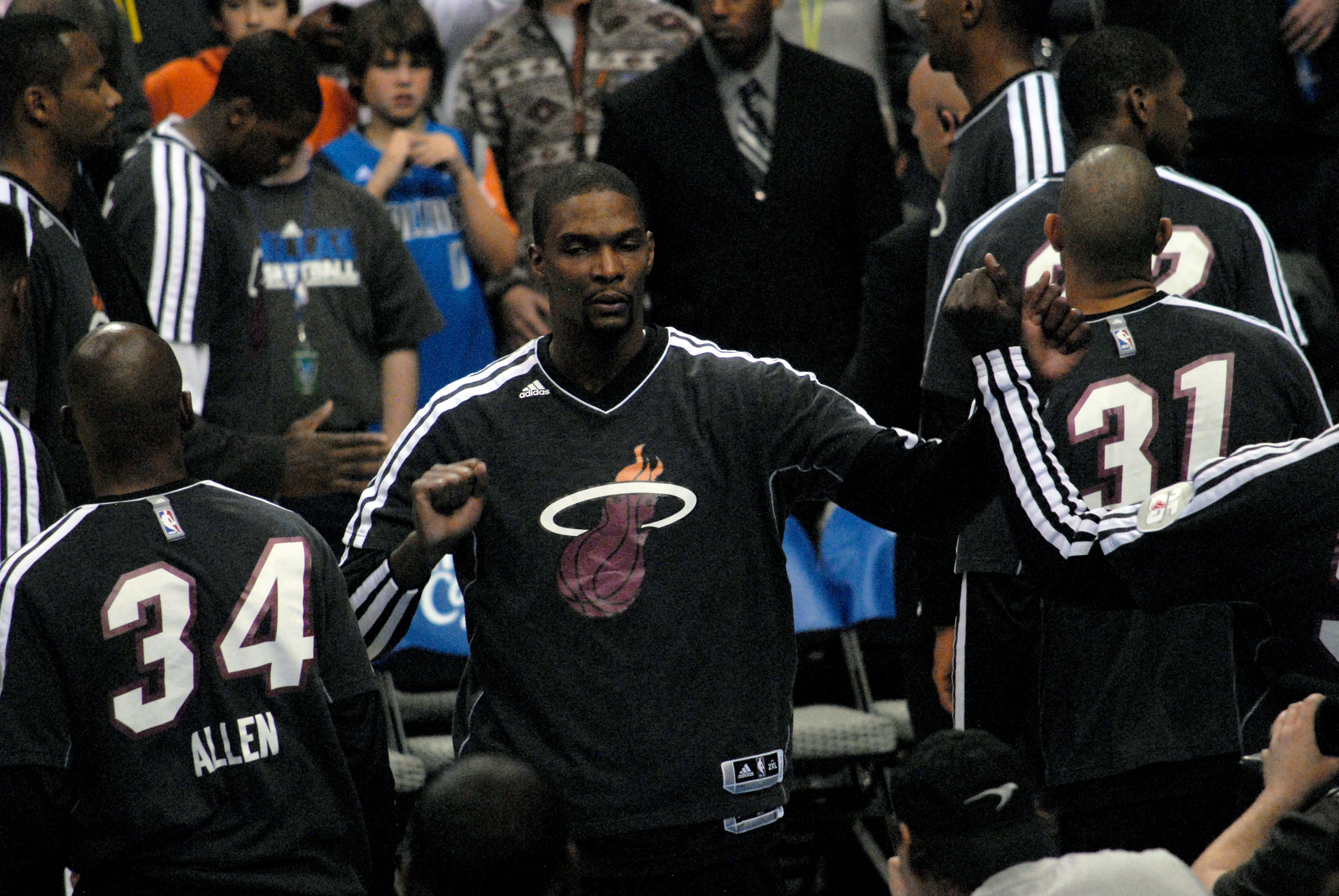
Chris Bosh

- June 28: The 2012 NBA draft took place at Prudential Center in Newark, New Jersey.
- July 11: In an utmost to bolster the roster, the Heat signed NBA veterans Rashard Lewis and Ray Allen, the NBA's all-time leader in three-pointers made at the time.
- October 30: The Heat opened the season with a 120–107 home victory over the Boston Celtics. The previous year's players received their championship rings and the team raised their 2nd championship banner into the American Airlines Arena rafters.
- November 3: LeBron James was honored before the game when the team raised a banner for his Olympic achievement. He is the fourth player in Heat history to win a gold medal, joining Dwyane Wade, Tim Hardaway and Alonzo Mourning.
- November 21: Udonis Haslem surpassed Alonzo Mourning in all-time rebounding for the Miami Heat and became the first undrafted player in NBA history to lead a franchise in rebounding. Adding to this accomplishment, Haslem has now starred in the most Miami Heat games played, one more than fellow captain Dwyane Wade.
- November 24: Chris Bosh surpassed the 13,000-point plateau.
- December 15: For the first time in franchise history, all 13 active players scored at least three points and converted one made field goal.
- December 25: Mike Miller surpassed the 10,000-point plateau.
- January 5: Terrel Harris was released.
- January 7: Josh Harrellson was released.
- January 8: Jarvis Varnado signed to a ten-day contract after being released from the Boston Celtics.
- January 10: The last time the Heat lost consecutive games. Throughout the rest of the regular season and the playoffs, they never had a losing streak over 1 game.
- January 16: LeBron James became the youngest player in NBA history to score 20,000 points. LeBron James also surpassed the 5,000-assist plateau.
- January 20: Chris Andersen signed to a ten-day contract.
- January 30: Chris Andersen signed to a second ten-day contract.
- February 3: The Heat defeated the Toronto Raptors on Super Bowl Sunday to start what would become the longest winning streak in the franchise and second in NBA history in a single season.
- February 8: Chris Andersen signed for the remainder of the season.
- February 12: LeBron James became the only player in NBA history to post 30+ points and shoot over 60% for six consecutive games.
- February 12: The Heat win their 1000th game in team history. They became the ninth fastest franchise to do so, posting a 1000-969 (.508) record on this date.
- February 21: Dexter Pittman traded to the Memphis Grizzlies in exchange for the draft rights to Ricky Sánchez.
- February 23: Dwyane Wade surpassed the 16,000-point plateau.
- March 2: Juwan Howard signed a 10-day contract, re-joining the Heat.
- March 4: The Heat beat the Minnesota Timberwolves 97–81 to extend their winning streak to a franchise-record 15 wins in a row, improving their record to 44–14.
- March 8: The Heat beat the Philadelphia 76ers 102–93, becoming the first team in the league to clinch a playoff berth and extending their winning streak to 17. They also marked their best record through 60 games in franchise history at 46–14.
- March 10: For the first time in franchise history, the Heat beat every single team in the NBA with their victory against the Indiana Pacers. Miami was able to defeat all 29 opponents by their 61st game.
- March 12: Juwan Howard signed to a second 10-day contract.
- March 18: The Heat came back from a 17-point deficit to defeat the Boston Celtics 105–103 by LeBron James game winning shot over Brandon Bass to clinch the Southeast Division for the third consecutive year and extend their winning streak to 23 games, the second longest in NBA history.
- March 20: The Heat overcame a league high 27-point third-quarter deficit to defeat the Cleveland Cavaliers 98–95 to extend their winning streak to 24 games.
- March 22: The Heat overcame an 11-point deficit to defeat the Detroit Pistons 103–89 to extend their winning streak to 25 games. This is the third consecutive game in which the Heat came back from double digit deficits, the fifth during the streak, and 11th of the season. Juwan Howard signed for the remainder of the season.
- March 24: The Heat overcame an 11-point deficit with Dwyane Wade inactive to defeat the Charlotte Bobcats 109–77 to extend their winning streak to 26 games. This is the fourth consecutive game in which the Heat came back from double digit deficits, the 6th during the streak, and 12th of the season.
- March 25: The Heat defeated Orlando 108–94 to extend their winning streak to 27 games.
- March 27: The Heat fall 101–97 to the Chicago Bulls, ending their winning streak at 27(Second longest winning streak in a season in NBA history).
- March 29: The Heat defeated the New Orleans Hornets 108–89, clinching the best record in the Eastern Conference for the third time in franchise history.
- March 31: The Heat defeated the San Antonio Spurs 88-86 without all-stars LeBron James and Dwyane Wade, along with Mario Chalmers, becoming the first team in NBA history to win at least 17 games in a calendar month.
- April 10: The Heat defeated the Washington Wizards 103–98, clinching the best record in the NBA and home-court advantage throughout the playoffs for the first time in franchise history, and improving their record to 62–16 to set a franchise record for wins in a season.
- April 14: The Heat defeated the Chicago Bulls 105–93, avenging the March 27 loss and winning their 36th game at home, the most in franchise history.
- April 15: The 16th back-to-back game night. The Heat earned a 15–1 record (.938) on the second night of a back-to-back set this season, tying Dallas (2006–07) for the best record on the second night of a back-to-back set in NBA history.
- April 17: The Heat concluded the regular season with a 105–93 victory over the Orlando Magic. They finished the season with a record of 66–16, going 37–4 at home and 29–12 on the road.
- April 28: The Heat defeated the Milwaukee Bucks in Game 4 of the Eastern Conference First Round, advancing to the Conference Semi-Finals.
- May 15: The Heat defeated the Chicago Bulls in Game 5 of the Eastern Conference Semi-Finals, advancing to the Conference Finals.
- June 3: The Heat defeated the Indiana Pacers in Game 7 of the Eastern Conference Finals, advancing to the NBA Finals for a third consecutive season, making them the first Eastern Conference team to accomplish this since the Chicago Bulls (1996–1998). Dwyane Wade also snapped a 12-game streak where he scored less than 20 points.
- June 18: The Heat came back from a 13-point deficit in the 4th quarter to defeat the San Antonio Spurs in Game 6 of the NBA Finals, with LeBron James scoring 18 points in the period and Ray Allen hitting a 3 to tie the game with 5 seconds left in regulation.
- June 20: The Heat defeated the San Antonio Spurs in the NBA Finals to repeat as NBA Champions.

== Draft picks ==
Round	Pick	Player	Position	Nationality	College/Team
1	27	Arnett Moultrie ^{[a]}	C	United States	Mississippi State

^{a} Traded to the Philadelphia 76ers for draft rights to Justin Hamilton and a future first-round pick.

== Roster ==
2012-13 Miami Heat roster
Players

Pos.	No.	Player	Height	Weight	DOB	From
G	34	Ray Allen	6 ft 5 in (1.96 m)	205 lb (93 kg)	1975–07–20	Connecticut
C	11	Chris Andersen	6 ft 10 in (2.08 m)	245 lb (111 kg)	1978-07–07	Blinn
F/C	50	Joel Anthony	6 ft 9 in (2.06 m)	245 lb (111 kg)	1982–08–09	UNLV
F	31	Shane Battier	6 ft 8 in (2.03 m)	220 lb (100 kg)	1978–09–09	Duke
F/C	1	Chris Bosh	6 ft 11 in (2.11 m)	235 lb (107 kg)	1984–05–19	Georgia Tech
G	15	Mario Chalmers	6 ft 2 in (1.88 m)	190 lb (86 kg)	1986–03–24	Kansas
G	30	Norris Cole	6 ft 2 in (1.88 m)	175 lb (79 kg)	1989–02–12	Cleveland State
F	40	Udonis Haslem	6 ft 8 in (2.03 m)	235 lb (107 kg)	1980–06–09	Florida
F	5	Juwan Howard	6 ft 9 in (2.06 m)	250 lb (113 kg)	1973–02–07	Michigan
F	6	LeBron James	6 ft 9 in (2.06 m)	250 lb (113 kg)	1984–12–30	St. Vincent–St. Mary HS (OH)
F	22	James Jones	6 ft 8 in (2.03 m)	215 lb (98 kg)	1980–10–04	Miami (FL)
F	9	Rashard Lewis	6 ft 10 in (2.08 m)	215 lb (98 kg)	1979-08–08
G/F	13	Mike Miller	6 ft 8 in (2.03 m)	218 lb (99 kg)	1980–02–19	Florida
F	24	Jarvis Varnado	6 ft 9 in (2.06 m)	230 lb (104 kg)	1988–03–01	Mississippi State
G	3	Dwyane Wade	6 ft 4 in (1.93 m)	220 lb (100 kg)	1982–01–17	Marquette

Coaches
Head coach
- Erik Spoelstra

Legend
- (DP) Unsigned draft pick
- (FA) Free agent
- (S) Suspended
- Injured

== Pre-season ==
2012 pre-season game log
Pre-season: 4–4 (home: 2–3; road: 2–1)

Game	Date	Team	Score	High points	High rebounds	High assists	Location Attendance	Record
1	October 7	@ Atlanta	L 79–92	Chris Bosh (22)	Bosh, James & Dozier (6)	LeBron James (6)	Philips Arena; 12,828	0–1
2	October 11	@ L.A. Clippers	W 94–80	LeBron James (20)	LeBron James (5)	LeBron James (5)	MasterCard Center, China; 17,006	1–1
3	October 14	L.A. Clippers	L 89–99	Rodney Carney (15)	Josh Harrellson (6)	LeBron James (4)	Mercedes-Benz Arena, China; 17,292	1–2
4	October 18	Detroit	W 105–78	Dwyane Wade (21)	Bosh & Battier (6)	LeBron James (8)	American Airlines Arena; 19,600	2–2
5	October 20	San Antonio	W 104–101	Rashard Lewis (15)	Dexter Pittman (6)	Garrett Temple (6)	American Airlines Arena; 19,600	3–2
6	October 23	@ Charlotte	W 98–92	Chris Bosh (21)	Chris Bosh (7)	LeBron James (8)	Time Warner Cable Arena; 17,924	4–2
7	October 24	Washington	L 94–101	Dwyane Wade (23)	Udonis Haslem (8)	LeBron James (6)	Sprint Center; 16,143	4–3
8	October 26	New Orleans	L 89–96	Chris Bosh (21)	Chris Bosh (10)	Mario Chalmers (5)	American Airlines Arena; 19,600	4-4

2012–13 season schedule

== Regular season ==
=== Game log ===
2012–13 game log
Total: 66–16 (Home: 37–4; Road: 29–12)
October: 1–0 (home: 1–0; road: 0–0)

Game	Date	Team	Score	High points	High rebounds	High assists	Location Attendance	Record
1	October 30	Boston	W 120–107	Dwyane Wade (29)	James & Bosh (10)	Mario Chalmers (11)	American Airlines Arena; 20,296	1–0

November : 10–3 (home: 6–0; road: 4–3)

Game	Date	Team	Score	High points	High rebounds	High assists	Location Attendance	Record
2	November 2	@ New York	L 84–104	LeBron James (23)	Chris Bosh (11)	LeBron James (5)	Madison Square Garden; 19,033	1–1
3	November 3	Denver	W 119–116	Chris Bosh (40)	LeBron James (9)	LeBron James (11)	American Airlines Arena; 20,296	2–1
4	November 5	Phoenix	W 124–99	LeBron James (23)	LeBron James (11)	Mario Chalmers (11)	American Airlines Arena; 19,600	3–1
5	November 7	Brooklyn	W 103–73	Dwyane Wade (22)	LeBron James (12)	LeBron James (8)	American Airlines Arena; 19,627	4–1
6	November 9	@ Atlanta	W 95–89	Chris Bosh (24)	LeBron James (11)	LeBron James (9)	Philips Arena; 16,785	5–1
7	November 11	@ Memphis	L 86–104	Chris Bosh (22)	LeBron James (10)	LeBron James (6)	FedExForum; 18,119	5–2
8	November 12	@ Houston	W 113–110	LeBron James (38)	James & Bosh (10)	Dwyane Wade (7)	Toyota Center; 18,041	6–2
9	November 14	@ L.A. Clippers	L 100–107	LeBron James (30)	Chris Bosh (9)	LeBron James (7)	Staples Center; 19,146	6–3
10	November 15	@ Denver	W 98–93	LeBron James (27)	LeBron James (7)	LeBron James (12)	Pepsi Center; 19,155	7–3
11	November 17	@ Phoenix	W 97–88	Chris Bosh (24)	Chris Bosh (9)	Mike Miller (5)	US Airways Center; 16,840	8–3
12	November 21	Milwaukee	W 113–106	James & Wade (28)	Chris Bosh (18)	LeBron James (8)	American Airlines Arena; 19,971	9–3
13	November 24	Cleveland	W 110–108	LeBron James (30)	Bosh & Wade (7)	LeBron James (5)	American Airlines Arena; 20,064	10–3
14	November 29	San Antonio	W 105–100	LeBron James (23)	Chris Bosh (12)	LeBron James (7)	American Airlines Arena; 19,703	11–3

December : 10–5 (home: 7–2; road: 3–3)

Game	Date	Team	Score	High points	High rebounds	High assists	Location Attendance	Record
15	December 1	Brooklyn	W 102–89	Dwyane Wade (34)	LeBron James (9)	Dwyane Wade (7)	American Airlines Arena; 19,961	12–3
16	December 4	@ Washington	L 101–105	LeBron James (26)	LeBron James (13)	LeBron James (11)	Verizon Center; 17,761	12–4
17	December 6	New York	L 92–112	LeBron James (31)	LeBron James (10)	LeBron James (9)	American Airlines Arena; 19,740	12–5
18	December 8	New Orleans	W 106–90	Dwyane Wade (26)	Chris Bosh (6)	LeBron James (7)	American Airlines Arena; 19,600	13–5
19	December 10	Atlanta	W 101–92	LeBron James (27)	Chris Bosh (10)	LeBron James (6)	American Airlines Arena; 19,600	14–5
20	December 12	Golden State	L 95–97	LeBron James (31)	Chris Bosh (13)	James & Wade (5)	American Airlines Arena; 19,600	14–6
21	December 15	Washington	W 102–72	LeBron James (23)	LeBron James (10)	Dwyane Wade (6)	American Airlines Arena; 19,724	15–6
22	December 18	Minnesota	W 103–92	Dwyane Wade (24)	LeBron James (6)	LeBron James (11)	American Airlines Arena; 19,862	16–6
23	December 20	@ Dallas	W 110–95	LeBron James (24)	LeBron James (9)	Dwyane Wade (6)	American Airlines Center; 20,160	17–6
24	December 22	Utah	W 105–89	LeBron James (30)	James & Haslem (9)	James & Wade (7)	American Airlines Arena; 20,087	18–6
25	December 25	Oklahoma City	W 103–97	LeBron James (29)	LeBron James (8)	LeBron James (9)	American Airlines Arena; 20,300	19–6
26	December 26	@ Charlotte	W 105–92	Dwyane Wade (29)	LeBron James (12)	LeBron James (8)	Time Warner Cable Arena; 19,602	20–6
27	December 28	@ Detroit	L 99–109	LeBron James (35)	Chris Bosh (9)	James & Cole (5)	The Palace of Auburn Hills; 22,076	20–7
28	December 29	@ Milwaukee	L 85–104	LeBron James (26)	Chris Bosh (16)	LeBron James (7)	BMO Harris Bradley Center; 18,717	20–8
29	December 31	@ Orlando	W 112–110	LeBron James (36)	LeBron James (8)	LeBron James (11)	Amway Center; 19,311	21–8

January : 8–5 (home: 4–1; road: 4–4)

Game	Date	Team	Score	High points	High rebounds	High assists	Location Attendance	Record
30	January 2	Dallas	W 119–109	LeBron James (32)	LeBron James (12)	LeBron James (9)	American Airlines Arena; 20,102	22–8
31	January 4	Chicago	L 89–96	LeBron James (30)	LeBron James (6)	Chris Bosh (5)	American Airlines Arena; 20,138	22–9
32	January 6	Washington	W 99–71	LeBron James (24)	Udonis Haslem (12)	LeBron James (7)	American Airlines Arena; 20,228	23–9
33	January 8	@ Indiana	L 77–87	Dwyane Wade (30)	LeBron James (10)	LeBron James (4)	Bankers Life Fieldhouse; 18,165	23–10
34	January 10	@ Portland	L 90–92	Chris Bosh (29)	LeBron James (10)	LeBron James (9)	Rose Garden; 20,536	23–11
35	January 12	@ Sacramento	W 128–99	Mario Chalmers (34)	Udonis Haslem (8)	James & Wade (7)	Sleep Train Arena; 14,367	24–11
36	January 14	@ Utah	L 97–104	LeBron James (32)	Haslem & Wade (5)	Mario Chalmers (7)	EnergySolutions Arena; 19,911	24–12
37	January 16	@ Golden State	W 92–75	LeBron James (25)	Udonis Haslem (10)	LeBron James (10)	Oracle Arena; 19,596	25–12
38	January 17	@ L.A. Lakers	W 99–90	LeBron James (39)	James & Haslem (7)	LeBron James (8)	Staples Center; 18,997	26–12
39	January 23	Toronto	W 123–116	Dwyane Wade (35)	Chris Bosh (12)	LeBron James (11)	American Airlines Arena; 20,002	27–12
40	January 25	Detroit	W 110–88	Dwyane Wade (29)	James & Bosh (7)	James & Wade (7)	American Airlines Arena; 20,236	28–12
41	January 27	@ Boston	L 98–100 (2OT)	LeBron James (34)	James & Bosh (16)	James & Wade (7)	TD Garden; 18,624	28–13
42	January 30	@ Brooklyn	W 105–85	LeBron James (24)	LeBron James (9)	LeBron James (7)	Barclays Center; 17,732	29–13

February : 12–1 (home: 7–0; road: 5–1)

Game	Date	Team	Score	High points	High rebounds	High assists	Location Attendance	Record
43	February 1	@ Indiana	L 89–102	LeBron James (28)	James & Wade (6)	Wade & Allen (5)	Bankers Life Fieldhouse; 18,165	29–14
44	February 3	@ Toronto	W 100–85	LeBron James (30)	LeBron James (8)	LeBron James (7)	Air Canada Centre; 19,800	30–14
45	February 4	Charlotte	W 99–94	LeBron James (31)	Dwyane Wade (12)	LeBron James (8)	American Airlines Arena; 19,600	31–14
46	February 6	Houston	W 114–108	LeBron James (32)	Udonis Haslem (13)	Dwyane Wade (8)	American Airlines Arena; 19,693	32–14
47	February 8	L.A. Clippers	W 111–89	LeBron James (30)	Rashard Lewis (7)	Dwyane Wade (7)	American Airlines Arena; 19,902	33–14
48	February 10	L.A. Lakers	W 107–97	LeBron James (32)	Chris Bosh (11)	James & Wade (5)	American Airlines Arena; 20,300	34–14
49	February 12	Portland	W 117–104	Chris Bosh (32)	Chris Bosh (11)	LeBron James (9)	American Airlines Arena; 20,032	35–14
50	February 14	@ Oklahoma City	W 110–100	LeBron James (39)	James & Bosh (12)	Dwyane Wade (8)	Chesapeake Energy Arena; 18,203	36–14
All-Star Break
51	February 20	@ Atlanta	W 103–90	LeBron James (24)	James & Bosh (6)	LeBron James (11)	Philips Arena; 18,238	37–14
52	February 21	@ Chicago	W 86–67	LeBron James (26)	LeBron James (12)	LeBron James (7)	United Center; 22,640	38–14
53	February 23	@ Philadelphia	W 114–90	Dwyane Wade (33)	LeBron James (10)	LeBron James (11)	Wells Fargo Center; 20,665	39–14
54	February 24	Cleveland	W 109–105	LeBron James (28)	Udonis Haslem (10)	LeBron James (8)	American Airlines Arena; 20,006	40–14
55	February 26	Sacramento	W 141–129 (2OT)	LeBron James (40)	James, Wade & Bosh (8)	LeBron James (16)	American Airlines Arena; 19,734	41–14

March : 17–1 (home: 7–0; road: 10–1)

Game	Date	Team	Score	High points	High rebounds	High assists	Location Attendance	Record
56	March 1	Memphis	W 98–91	Dwyane Wade (22)	LeBron James (8)	LeBron James (10)	American Airlines Arena; 20,128	42–14
57	March 3	@ New York	W 99–93	LeBron James (29)	LeBron James (11)	Dwyane Wade (8)	Madison Square Garden; 19,033	43–14
58	March 4	@ Minnesota	W 97–81	Dwyane Wade (32)	LeBron James (10)	Dwyane Wade (10)	Target Center; 18,391	44–14
59	March 6	Orlando	W 97–96	LeBron James (26)	Chris Bosh (10)	Mario Chalmers (5)	American Airlines Arena; 20,001	45–14
60	March 8	Philadelphia	W 102–93	LeBron James (25)	LeBron James (10)	LeBron James (5)	American Airlines Arena; 20,029	46–14
61	March 10	Indiana	W 105–91	Mario Chalmers (26)	Mario Chalmers (7)	LeBron James (7)	American Airlines Arena; 20,219	47–14
62	March 12	Atlanta	W 98–81	Dwyane Wade (23)	Udonis Haslem (11)	LeBron James (7)	American Airlines Arena; 20,350	48–14
63	March 13	@ Philadelphia	W 98–94	LeBron James (27)	Dwyane Wade (8)	LeBron James (8)	Wells Fargo Center; 20,398	49–14
64	March 15	@ Milwaukee	W 107–94	LeBron James (28)	LeBron James (10)	Dwyane Wade (9)	BMO Harris Bradley Center; 18,717	50–14
65	March 17	@ Toronto	W 108–91	Dwyane Wade (24)	LeBron James (12)	Dwyane Wade (9)	Air Canada Centre; 18,564	51–14
66	March 18	@ Boston	W 105–103	LeBron James (37)	LeBron James (7)	LeBron James (12)	TD Garden; 18,624	52–14
67	March 20	@ Cleveland	W 98–95	LeBron James (25)	LeBron James (12)	LeBron James (10)	Quicken Loans Arena; 20,561	53–14
68	March 22	Detroit	W 103–89	LeBron James (29)	LeBron James (8)	LeBron James (8)	American Airlines Arena; 20,350	54–14
69	March 24	Charlotte	W 109–77	LeBron James (32)	LeBron James (8)	LeBron James (10)	American Airlines Arena; 20,350	55–14
70	March 25	@ Orlando	W 108–94	LeBron James (24)	Udonis Haslem (10)	LeBron James (11)	Amway Center; 18,846	56–14
71	March 27	@ Chicago	L 97–101	LeBron James (32)	James & Wade (7)	Mario Chalmers (4)	United Center; 23,014	56–15
72	March 29	@ New Orleans	W 108–89	LeBron James (36)	Mike Miller (6)	Dwyane Wade (9)	New Orleans Arena; 18,647	57–15
73	March 31	@ San Antonio	W 88–86	Chris Bosh (23)	Chris Bosh (9)	Miller & Allen (5)	AT&T Center; 18,581	58–15

April: 8–1 (home: 5–1; road: 3–0)

Game	Date	Team	Score	High points	High rebounds	High assists	Location Attendance	Record
74	April 2	New York	L 90–102	Chris Bosh (23)	Battier & Miller (8)	Bosh & Miller (4)	American Airlines Arena; 20,300	58–16
75	April 5	@ Charlotte	W 89–79	Mike Miller (26)	Chris Bosh (8)	Mario Chalmers (7)	Time Warner Cable Arena; 19,568	59–16
76	April 6	Philadelphia	W 106–87	LeBron James (27)	Chris Andersen (15)	LeBron James (5)	American Airlines Arena; 20,168	60–16
77	April 9	Milwaukee	W 94–83	LeBron James (28)	Udonis Haslem (15)	LeBron James (7)	American Airlines Arena; 19,834	61–16
78	April 10	@ Washington	W 103–98	Ray Allen (23)	Mike Miller (8)	Mario Chalmers (8)	Verizon Center; 20,308	62–16
79	April 12	Boston	W 109–101	LeBron James (20)	Chris Bosh (7)	LeBron James (9)	American Airlines Arena; 19,990	63–16
80	April 14	Chicago	W 105–93	LeBron James (24)	Chris Bosh (9)	LeBron James (6)	American Airlines Arena; 19,810	64–16
81	April 15	@ Cleveland	W 96–95	Rashard Lewis (19)	Norris Cole (11)	Norris Cole (9)	Quicken Loans Arena; 19,091	65–16
82	April 17	Orlando	W 105–93	Wade & Miller (21)	Lewis & Andersen (8)	Dwyane Wade (10)	American Airlines Arena; 19,949	66–16

2012–13 season schedule

=== Standings ===
Southeast Division	W	L	PCT	GB	Home	Road	Div	GP
z-Miami Heat	66	16	.805	–	37–4	29–12	15–1	82
x-Atlanta Hawks	44	38	.537	22	25–16	19–22	11–5	82
Washington Wizards	29	53	.354	37	22–19	7–34	5–11	82
Charlotte Bobcats	21	61	.256	45	15–26	6–35	6–10	82
Orlando Magic	20	62	.244	46	12–29	8–33	3–13	82

Eastern Conference
#	Team	W	L	PCT	GB	GP
1	z-Miami Heat *	66	16	.805	–	82
2	y-New York Knicks *	54	28	.659	12.0	82
3	y-Indiana Pacers *	49	32	.605	16.5	81
4	x-Brooklyn Nets	49	33	.598	17.0	82
5	x-Chicago Bulls	45	37	.549	21.0	82
6	x-Atlanta Hawks	44	38	.537	22.0	82
7	x-Boston Celtics	41	40	.506	24.5	81
8	x-Milwaukee Bucks	38	44	.463	28.0	82
9	Philadelphia 76ers	34	48	.415	32.0	82
10	Toronto Raptors	34	48	.415	32.0	82
11	Washington Wizards	29	53	.354	37.0	82
12	Detroit Pistons	29	53	.354	37.0	82
13	Cleveland Cavaliers	24	58	.293	42.0	82
14	Charlotte Bobcats	21	61	.256	45.0	82
15	Orlando Magic	20	62	.244	46.0	82

== Playoffs ==
=== Game log ===
2013 playoff game log
Total: 16–7 (Home: 10–3; Road: 6–4)
First Round: 4–0 (home: 2–0; road: 2–0)

Game	Date	Team	Score	High points	High rebounds	High assists	Location Attendance	Series
1	April 21	Milwaukee	W 110–87	LeBron James (27)	LeBron James (10)	LeBron James (10)	American Airlines Arena; 20,006	1–0
2	April 23	Milwaukee	W 98–86	Dwyane Wade (21)	LeBron James (8)	LeBron James (6)	American Airlines Arena; 20,097	2–0
3	April 25	@ Milwaukee	W 104–91	Ray Allen (23)	Chris Bosh (14)	Dwyane Wade (11)	BMO Harris Bradley Center; 18,165	3–0
4	April 28	@ Milwaukee	W 88–77	LeBron James (30)	Chalmers & James (8)	LeBron James (7)	BMO Harris Bradley Center; 18,717	4–0

Conference Semifinals: 4–1 (home: 2–1; road: 2–0)

Game	Date	Team	Score	High points	High rebounds	High assists	Location Attendance	Series
1	May 6	Chicago	L 86–93	LeBron James (24)	LeBron James (8)	Chalmers & James (7)	American Airlines Arena; 19,685	0–1
2	May 8	Chicago	W 115–78	Ray Allen (21)	Norris Cole (6)	LeBron James (9)	American Airlines Arena; 19,817	1–1
3	May 10	@ Chicago	W 104–94	LeBron James (25)	Chris Bosh (19)	LeBron James (7)	United Center; 22,675	2–1
4	May 13	@ Chicago	W 88–65	LeBron James (27)	Haslem & James (7)	LeBron James (8)	United Center; 21,990	3–1
5	May 15	Chicago	W 94–91	LeBron James (23)	Bosh & James (7)	LeBron James (8)	American Airlines Arena; 20,250	4–1

Conference Finals: 4–3 (home: 3–1; road: 1–2)

Game	Date	Team	Score	High points	High rebounds	High assists	Location Attendance	Series
1	May 22	Indiana	W 103–102	LeBron James (30)	LeBron James (10)	LeBron James (10)	American Airlines Arena; 19,679	1–0
2	May 24	Indiana	L 93–97	LeBron James (36)	LeBron James (8)	Chalmers & Wade (5)	American Airlines Arena; 20,022	1–1
3	May 26	@ Indiana	W 114–96	LeBron James (22)	Chris Andersen (9)	Dwyane Wade (8)	Bankers Life Fieldhouse; 18,165	2–1
4	May 28	@ Indiana	L 92–99	LeBron James (24)	Ray Allen (7)	Dwyane Wade (6)	Bankers Life Fieldhouse; 18,165	2–2
5	May 30	Indiana	W 90–79	LeBron James (30)	LeBron James (8)	Chalmers & James (6)	American Airlines Arena; 19,913	3–2
6	June 1	@ Indiana	L 77–91	LeBron James (29)	Joel Anthony (8)	LeBron James (6)	Bankers Life Fieldhouse; 18,165	3–3
7	June 3	Indiana	W 99–76	LeBron James (32)	Dwyane Wade (9)	Norris Cole & James (4)	American Airlines Arena; 20,025	4–3

NBA Finals: 4–3 (home: 3–1; road: 1–2)

Game	Date	Team	Score	High points	High rebounds	High assists	Location Attendance	Series
1	June 6	San Antonio	L 88–92	LeBron James (18)	LeBron James (18)	LeBron James (10)	American Airlines Arena; 19,775	0–1
2	June 9	San Antonio	W 103–84	Mario Chalmers (19)	Chris Bosh (10)	LeBron James (7)	American Airlines Arena; 19,990	1–1
3	June 11	@ San Antonio	L 77–113	Dwyane Wade (16)	LeBron James (11)	Wade & James (5)	AT&T Center; 18,581	1–2
4	June 13	@ San Antonio	W 109–93	LeBron James (33)	Chris Bosh (13)	Mario Chalmers (5)	AT&T Center; 18,581	2–2
5	June 16	@ San Antonio	L 104–114	James & Wade (25)	Bosh & James (6)	Dwyane Wade (10)	AT&T Center; 18,581	2–3
6	June 18	San Antonio	W 103–100 (OT)	LeBron James (32)	Chris Bosh (11)	LeBron James (11)	American Airlines Arena; 19,900	3–3
7	June 20	San Antonio	W 95–88	LeBron James (37)	LeBron James (12)	Allen & James (4)	American Airlines Arena; 19,900	4–3

2013 playoff schedule

== NBA records ==
The following records were set or tied by the Heat this season-

- Most wins in a month: The Heat went 17–1 in March 2013, becoming the first team to win 17 games in a single calendar month in NBA history.
- Second longest win streak in a season: The Heat went on a 27-game win streak, becoming the second team with the longest win streak in a season behind the Lakers (33).
- Overtime in Postseason: The HEAT's 103–100 overtime win vs. SA on June 18, 2013, improved their all-time postseason overtime record to 8-1 (.889). Their .889 postseason winning percentage is the best among teams with at least three overtime games played and the second-highest among all teams.
- DOUBLE-DIGIT wins in Postseason: The HEAT's 16-point, 109–93, win in Game Four of the NBA Finals at SA on June 13, 2013, was Miami's 12th double-figure win in the 2013 postseason. The 12 double-digit wins are the most by any team during a single postseason in NBA history. The previous record was 11, held by five different teams, each winning the NBA Championship that postseason. This record would later be tied by the 2013-14 San Antonio Spurs and the 2016-17 Golden State Warriors.
- Highest Field Goal Made Percentage, post season: Chris "Birdman" Andersen shot 80.7 percent (46-of-57) from the field in the 2013 postseason. He has become the first player in NBA postseason history to take at least 35 shots and shoot better than 75 percent from the field.
- SIX AND SEVEN over 30 points: LeBron James scored 32 points in Game Six of the NBA Finals on June 18, 2013, and then made 37 points in Game Seven on June 20, 2013. According to Elias Sports Bureau, he became the first player in NBA history to score consecutive 30-point games to help rally his team from a 3–2 series deficit to win an NBA title.
- GAME SEVEN over 30 Points: LeBron James finished the 2013 postseason by recording his fourth-straight 30-point Game Seven by scoring 37 points vs. SA in the NBA Finals. He had previously scored 32 points vs. IND on June 3, 2013, 31 points vs. BOS on June 9, 2012, and 45 points at BOS on May 18, 2008. The Elias Sports Bureau reports he has tied the record of the only other player to score at least 30 points in four consecutive Game Seven's, Elgin Baylor (33 at STL on 3/26/60, 39 at STL on 4/1/61, 41 at BOS on 4/18/62, 35 vs. STL on 4/11/63 & 33 vs. STL on 4/15/66).
- Highest Scoring average in game sevens: LeBron James is averaging 34.4 points in Game Seven's of the postseason during his career, currently the best average in NBA history.
- Most 3 point FG in Postseason: Ray Allen owns the record for most 3 point field goals in the postseason – 352.
- Most 4 point plays in a Finals game, 2: On June 16, 2013, Ray Allen converted two free throws after making three point field goals, one at the 5:08 mark in the 2nd quarter, and the other with 8:37 left in the 4th quarter. There had previously been only 12 four point plays in the NBA Finals history.
- Team Leader in Points, Rebounds, and Assists: LeBron James’ 18 points, 18 rebounds and 10 assists vs. SA on June 6, 2013, was the 28th time he has led his team outright (no ties) in each of those categories during the playoffs, the most in NBA postseason history. In addition, he has been the outright game-high leader (no ties) in each of those categories eight times, also the most in NBA postseason history. His eight such games are more than the combined total of the next three players to achieve the feat.
- 25-10-8: LeBron James’ 32 points, 10 rebounds and 11 assists vs. SA on June 18, 2013, marked his 15th postseason 25-point, 10-rebound, eight-assist game, the most in NBA postseason history. According to Elias, second on this list is Oscar Robertson with 10 such games.
- BACK-TO-BACKS: The HEAT recorded a 15–1 record (.938) on the second night of a back-to-back set in the 2012–13 season, tying for the best record on the second night of a back-to-back set in NBA history. The Dallas Mavericks also finished 15-1 (.938) in such games during the 2006–07 season.

== Injuries ==
- Dwyane Wade underwent surgery on his left knee following the end of the 2011–12 season. Wade returned in time for the Heat's second pre-season game against the Los Angeles Clippers at the MasterCard Center in Beijing, China.

== Player statistics ==
=== Regular season ===
Player	POS	GP	GS	MP	REB	AST	STL	BLK	PTS	MPG	RPG	APG	SPG	BPG	PPG
Norris Cole	PG	80	4	1,590	130	164	57	7	445	19.9	1.6	2.1	.7	.1	5.6
Ray Allen	SG	79	0	2,035	217	135	67	15	863	25.8	2.7	1.7	.8	.2	10.9
Mario Chalmers	PG	77	77	2,068	171	273	118	12	666	26.9	2.2	3.5	1.5	.2	8.6
LeBron James	PF	76	76	2,877	610	551	129	67	2,036	37.9	8.0	7.3	1.7	.9	26.8
Udonis Haslem	PF	75	59	1,414	404	38	30	15	290	18.9	5.4	.5	.4	.2	3.9
Chris Bosh	C	74	74	2,454	501	123	66	101	1,232	33.2	6.8	1.7	.9	1.4	16.6
Shane Battier	SF	72	20	1,786	165	72	41	55	472	24.8	2.3	1.0	.6	.8	6.6
Dwyane Wade	SG	69	69	2,391	344	352	128	56	1,463	34.7	5.0	5.1	1.9	.8	21.2
Joel Anthony	C	62	3	566	115	13	13	42	87	9.1	1.9	.2	.2	.7	1.4
Mike Miller	SF	59	17	900	157	99	21	4	281	15.3	2.7	1.7	.4	.1	4.8
Rashard Lewis	PF	55	9	792	121	30	21	14	285	14.4	2.2	.5	.4	.3	5.2
Chris Andersen	C	42	0	624	172	17	16	44	207	14.9	4.1	.4	.4	1.0	4.9
James Jones	SF	38	0	221	22	13	2	6	60	5.8	.6	.3	.1	.2	1.6
Jarvis Varnado^{†}	PF	8	0	40	6	2	0	2	2	5.0	.8	.3	.0	.3	.3
Juwan Howard	PF	7	2	51	8	6	0	0	21	7.3	1.1	.9	.0	.0	3.0
Terrel Harris^{†}	SG	7	0	29	9	2	0	0	10	4.1	1.3	.3	.0	.0	1.4
Josh Harrellson	C	6	0	31	7	0	1	1	10	5.2	1.2	.0	.2	.2	1.7
Dexter Pittman^{†}	C	4	0	12	7	0	0	0	6	3.0	1.8	.0	.0	.0	1.5

- ^{†} Denotes player spent time with another team in the season. Stats reflect time with the Heat only.

=== Playoffs ===
Player	POS	GP	GS	MP	REB	AST	STL	BLK	PTS	MPG	RPG	APG	SPG	BPG	PPG
LeBron James	PF	23	23	960	193	152	41	18	596	41.7	8.4	6.6	1.8	.8	25.9
Chris Bosh	C	23	23	751	167	34	23	36	279	32.7	7.3	1.5	1.0	1.6	12.1
Mario Chalmers	PG	23	23	650	53	71	21	1	216	28.3	2.3	3.1	.9	.0	9.4
Ray Allen	SG	23	0	573	64	29	12	3	234	24.9	2.8	1.3	.5	.1	10.2
Dwyane Wade	SG	22	22	782	102	105	38	23	349	35.5	4.6	4.8	1.7	1.0	15.9
Udonis Haslem	PF	22	19	357	80	6	15	5	110	16.2	3.6	.3	.7	.2	5.0
Shane Battier	SF	22	0	392	38	12	5	6	103	17.8	1.7	.5	.2	.3	4.7
Norris Cole	PG	21	0	418	39	42	15	2	129	19.9	1.9	2.0	.7	.1	6.1
Chris Andersen	C	20	0	303	76	3	9	22	128	15.2	3.8	.2	.5	1.1	6.4
Mike Miller	SF	17	5	232	33	15	8	2	58	13.6	1.9	.9	.5	.1	3.4
Joel Anthony	C	14	0	71	21	0	2	4	6	5.1	1.5	.0	.1	.3	.4
Rashard Lewis	PF	11	0	47	7	4	2	2	17	4.3	.6	.4	.2	.2	1.5
James Jones	SF	9	0	33	3	0	0	1	9	3.7	.3	.0	.0	.1	1.0

== Transactions ==
=== Overview ===
Players Added

Via free agency

- Ray Allen
- Rodney Carney
- Rashard Lewis
- Mickell Gladness ^{[a]}
- Josh Harrellson
- Garrett Temple
Players Lost

Via free agency

- Eddy Curry
- Ronny Turiaf

- ^{a} Cut from the roster during training camp.

=== Trades ===
June 28, 2012 (Draft day)	To Miami Heat Draft rights to Justin Hamilton; Future first round pick	To Philadelphia 76ers Draft rights to Arnett Moultrie

=== Free agents ===
Additions
Player	Date signed	Former team
Ray Allen	July 11	Boston Celtics
Rashard Lewis	July 11	Washington Wizards
Terrel Harris	September 11	Miami Heat (Re-signed)
Garrett Temple	September 13	Novipiù Casale Monferrato (Italy)
Josh Harrellson	September 17	Houston Rockets (claimed off waivers)
Rodney Carney	September 27	Liaoning Dinosaurs (China)

Subtractions
Player	Date left	New team
Ronny Turiaf	July 27	Los Angeles Clippers
Eddy Curry	October 1	San Antonio Spurs
