= Finnegan (surname) =

Origin
- Language: Gaelic
- Origin: Fionn
- Meaning: "fairhaired"
- Region of origin: Ireland

Other names
- Variant forms: Ó Fionnagáin, Fionnagán

Finnegan is an Irish surname coming from the Gaelic Ó Fionnagáin, meaning "son of fairhaired", or Fionnagán, from the diminutive personal name of Fionn, meaning "fairhaired".

== History ==
The majority of Ulster and Leinster Finnegans are descended from the Ó Fionnagáin sept, established on the borders of the ancient kingdoms of Breffni and Oriel. Their patrimony comprised the district where the three counties of Cavan, Meath and Monaghan meet. Frequently mentioned in the Irish Annals, they were able to retain most of their lands until the middle of the 16th century, when the present counties were formed. Over a hundred years later, when Petty's census was compiled, Finnegan was still recorded as a principal surname in counties Cavan and Monaghan. Near the close of the 12th century, a branch of this family migrated southward, settling in County Wicklow. Although no longer numerous in that county, during the Middle Ages they were a sept of considerable importance. An entry in the “Annals of Loch Cé” relating to County Wicklow describes Newcastle O’Finnegan. Tudor and Elizabethan fiants and other contemporary 16th and 17th century records list members of the family among the landed gentry of east Leinster.

In medieval Ireland, there were two prominent Finnegan septs, both of whose descendants are found in considerable numbers in their original homelands. The Connacht family of Ó Fionnagáin was seated in northeast County Roscommon and the adjacent areas of County Galway. Of Uí Fiachrach lineage, they stemmed from Fiachra, son of Eochaidh Muighmheadhoin, King of Ireland in the mid-4th century and father of Daithi, last pagan monarch of the country. Chiefs in this sept held sway over a territory encompassing an extensive portion of the baronies of Castlereagh, County Roscommon, and Ballymoe in County Galway. Place names Ballyfinnegan, one in each barony, attest to this family's predominance in the region.

== Notable people with the surname ==
- Brandon Finnegan (born 1993), American baseball player
- Casey Finnegan (1890–1958), American football coach
- Chris Finnegan (1944–2009), English boxer
- Christian Finnegan (born 1973), American comedian
- Cortland Finnegan (born 1984), American football player
- Dana Finnegan (1932–2022), American addiction counselor
- Edward Rowan Finnegan, attorney and politician from Illinois
- George Finnegan (1881–1913), American boxer
- James Finnegan, multiple people
- Jean Finnegan, Australian scientist
- John Finnegan, multiple people
- Joseph Finnegan, multiple people
- Kevin Finnegan (1948–2008), English boxer
- Kyle Finnegan (born 1991), American baseball player
- Larry Finnegan (1938–1973), American pop singer
- Martin Finnegan, Irish motorcycle road racer
- Michael Finnegan, multiple people
- Mick Finnegan, president of the Workers' Party of Ireland
- Patrick Finnegan, United States military officer and educator
- Shonnie Finnegan, American archivist
- Susan Finnegan (1903–1995), British arachnologist
- William Finnegan (born 1952), American author and journalist

== Others ==
- "Michael Finnegan", a non-stop children's song
- Tim Finnegan, a fictional character, central to James Joyce's Finnegans Wake
- Seamus Finnigan, fictional character in Harry Potter.
