= Finegan =

Finegan is an Irish surname derived from the native Gaelic Ó Fionnagáin Septs that were located mostly in Counties Galway, Roscommon and Louth. Descendants bearing this name, and its variant Finnegan can still be mostly found in these three Counties. It

Notable people with the surname include:

- Bernard Finegan (1837–1887), Irish Roman Catholic bishop
- Bill Finegan (1917–2008), American jazz musician
- Christopher Finegan (born 1971), English cricketer
- Cole Finegan (born 1956), American businessman
- George Finegan (born 1935), Australian rules footballer
- Jack Finegan (1908–2000), American biblical scholar
- Joseph Finegan (1814–1885), Irish-born American businessman
- Owen Finegan (born 1972), Australian rugby union player
- Seán Finegan, Irish comedian

== See also ==
- Finnegan (disambiguation)
