= 2011 NBA lockout =

Lockout of National Basketball Association players

- Date: July 1, 2011 – December 8, 2011 (5 months and 1 week)
- Location: United States; Canada
- Caused by: Expiration of the 2005 NBA Collective Bargaining Agreement; Stalemate over division of the NBA's basketball-related income, salary cap structure, and luxury tax proposals between NBA team owners and players
- Goals: Owners proposed a reduction of players' salaries from 57% to 47% of the league's income; Players counter-proposed a reduction of players' salaries to 53%
- Result: Agreement reached to end lockout on November 26, 2011: New ten-year collective bargaining agreement ratified on December 8; players' salaries reduced from 57% to between 49% and 51% of the league's income; 2011–12 season reduced to 66 games per team

Parties
National Basketball Players Association (NBPA)	National Basketball Association (NBA)

Lead figures
Billy Hunter (executive director); Derek Fisher (president)	David Stern (commissioner); Adam Silver (deputy commissioner)

The 2011 NBA lockout was the fourth and most recent lockout in the history of the National Basketball Association (NBA). Team owners began the work stoppage upon expiration of the 2005 collective bargaining agreement (CBA). The 161-day lockout began on July 1, 2011, and ended on December 8, 2011. It delayed the start of the 2011–12 regular season from November to December, and it reduced the regular season from 82 to 66 games. The previous lockout in 1998–99 had shortened the season to 50 games. During the lockout, teams could not trade, sign, or contact players. Players additionally did not have access to NBA team facilities, trainers, or staff.

Negotiations between the owners, led by league commissioner David Stern, and the players, headed by director Billy Hunter and president Derek Fisher of the labor union National Basketball Players Association (NBPA), began in early 2011 and continued through November. The main issues dividing both sides were the division of revenue, the structure of the salary cap and luxury tax. Owners proposed to reduce the players' share of basketball related income (BRI) from 57% to 47%, but the players countered with 53% of BRI. Owners wanted to implement a hard salary cap and a harsher luxury tax, hoping to increase competition among teams, whereas players wanted to keep the current soft salary cap structure intact.

As both sides failed to reach an agreement, the NBA canceled the preseason and all games through December. On November 14, the players dissolved the union, allowing them to file antitrust lawsuits against the league. On November 26, both sides reached a tentative agreement to end the lockout. The new CBA calls for a revenue split of 49-to-51.2% and a flexible salary cap structure with harsher luxury tax. After the tentative deal was reached, owners allowed players to have voluntary workouts at team sites starting December 1. After the deal was ratified on December 8, training camps, trades, and free agency began the next day. During the lockout, some players signed contracts to play in other countries, mostly in Europe and Asia, with most of them having the option to return upon the lockout's conclusion. The lockout also affected the economy outside the league due largely to cities that had teams in the league losing revenue generated by games as well as television networks that broadcast the league losing ratings and advertisement revenue due to games not being played.

== Chronology ==
- July 1, 2011: The lockout begins.
- September 23, 2011: The NBA canceled training camp, which was to begin October 3, and the first week of preseason games, which were to run October 9 through 15.
- October 4, 2011: The NBA canceled the remainder of the preseason.
- October 10, 2011: The first two weeks of the regular season canceled.
- October 18, 2011: All games through November 30 canceled.
- November 14, 2011: The NBPA dissolves labor union into a trade association.
- November 15, 2011: The NBA canceled all games through December 15. Players filed antitrust lawsuits against the NBA in Chicago and New Mexico federal courts.
- November 26, 2011: The NBA owners and players reached a tentative agreement to end the lockout.
- December 1, 2011: The NBPA re-formed as a union.
- December 8, 2011: The new CBA is ratified, officially ending the lockout.
- December 25, 2011: NBA season begins.

== Background ==
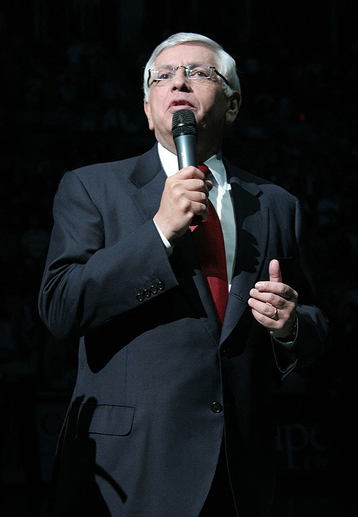
All four lockouts have occurred in David Stern's tenure as NBA commissioner.

After the previous lockout, which shortened the 1998–99 season from 82 to 50 games, a six-year deal between the owners, led by commissioner David Stern, and the players, led by director Billy Hunter and president Patrick Ewing of the labor union National Basketball Players Association (NBPA), was reached. As the CBA was set to expire on June 30, 2005, the two sides began to negotiate in early 2005. There were several issues obstructing the new agreement, which included adding an age limit for rookies, toughening the existing drug-testing program and limiting the length of long-term contracts. However, negotiations went smoothly and the two sides were able to reach a deal in June 2005, avoiding the lockout. That deal guaranteed players 57% of basketball-related income (BRI) and lasted for six years, until June 30, 2011. A year after signing the deal, eight owners signed a petition requesting Stern address the disparity between small-market and large-market teams. They wrote that "the hard truth is that our current economic system works only for larger-market teams and a few teams that have extraordinary success ...The rest of us are looking at significant and unacceptable annual financial losses."

Derek Fisher succeeded Ewing as NBPA president in 2006. In early 2011, negotiations on a new CBA began. The league claimed that it was losing $300 million a year (22 out of 30 teams were losing money last season) and proposed to reduce 40% of players' salary (about $800 million) and institute a hard salary cap (at $45 million per team) as opposed to a soft cap (at $58 million) currently in use. The union disputed those figures and steadfastly opposed those changes. Hunter said that he was advising players to prepare for a lockout. In May 2011, the NBPA filed a complaint with the National Labor Relations Board (NLRB), accusing the league of negotiating in bad faith by failing to provide critical financial data to the union and repeatedly threatening to lock out players. The NBA quickly rejected the complaint, saying that the league complies fully with federal labor laws. The union also considered the option of decertification, which allows players to file an antitrust lawsuit against the NBA.

With time winding down, negotiations continued in May and June. On the salary cap, the owners, in their newest proposal, call for a system called the "flex cap" that limits payroll at $62 million but penalizes teams if the teams payroll exceeds the league's average payroll of that season. The union argued that it is still a hard cap because the ceiling would kick in eventually. On salary reduction, players offered to cut $500 million over the next five years (their share of BRI would be reduced from 57 to 54.3 percent). The owners instead proposed to cut $2 billion over the next 10 years.

As a last-ditch effort to avert a lockout, owners and players met again on June 30, 2011, to negotiate, but both sides failed to reach a resolution on key issues like salary cap and BRI splits. Both Stern and Hunter said that the two sides remained far apart. The owners demanded a larger share, claiming that they were losing money. The players, on the other hand, were willing to make concessions, but they refused to completely cave in to owners' demands. Negotiations broke off, and the CBA expired at midnight.

== Lockout ==
=== Initial months ===
The lockout was officially started by the owners on July 1, 2011, during which teams could not trade, sign, or contact players, and players could not access NBA team facilities, trainers, or staffs. Negotiations resumed at an August 1 bargaining session, but it fell apart after three hours. On August 2, 2011, the NBA filed two unfair labor practice claims against the NBPA, one at the NLRB and another at a federal district court in New York. The league accused the players of being uncooperative in negotiations by threatening to dissolve their union and file antitrust lawsuits. Hunter, in a statement released by the union, called the lawsuits "without merit" and that the union would seek to dismiss it in court. On August 4, Hunter said that he thought the entire 2011–12 season would likely be canceled.

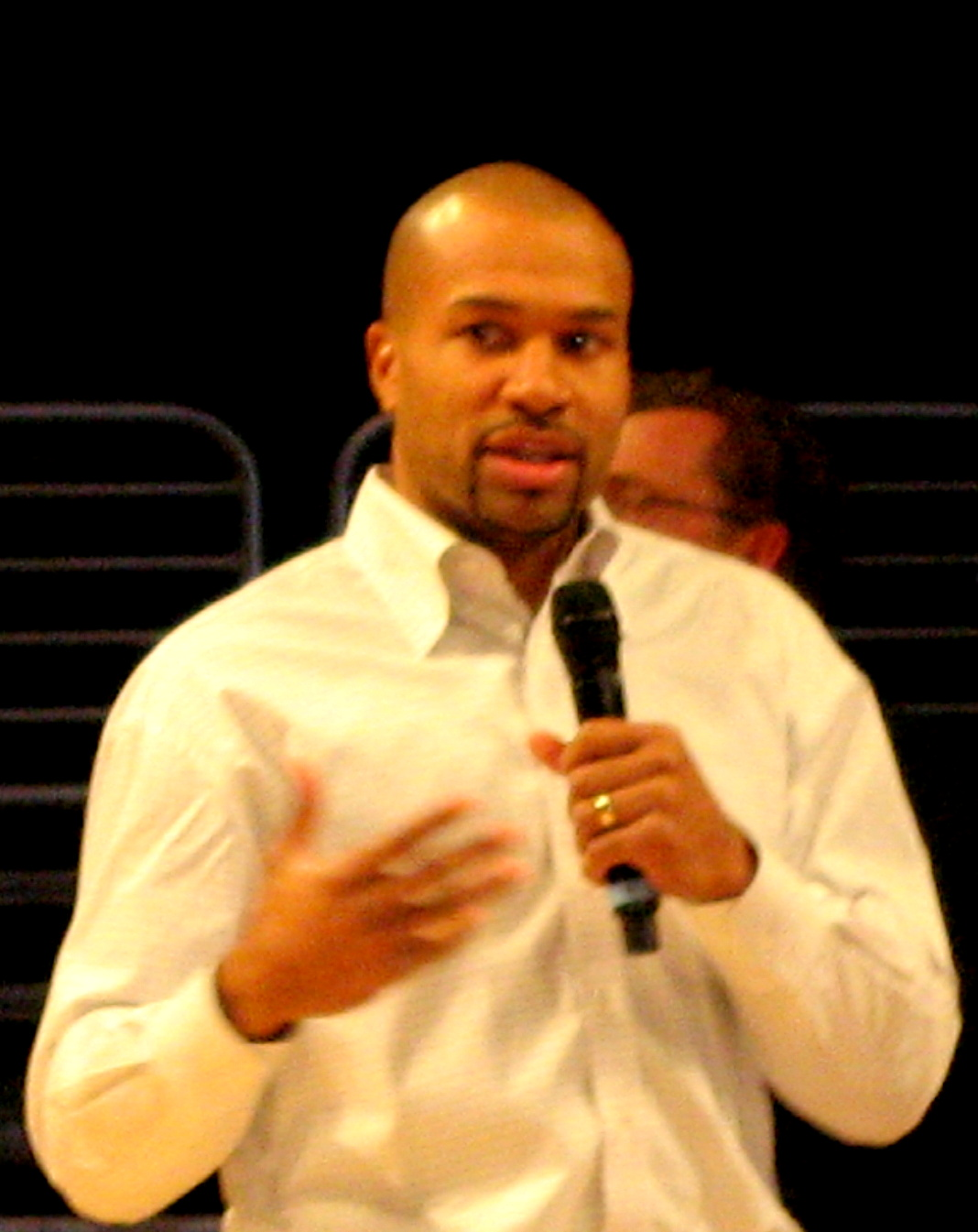
Derek Fisher was the players union president during the lockout.

The NBPA and the owners returned to negotiate again on August 31 with a sense of urgency. No specifics were disclosed although both sides hoped to meet again soon. "Everyone loses if we don't reach an agreement, that's something that I think has always been understood," said union president Derek Fisher. "I will say we are not apart in terms of an agreed urgency on getting a deal done," said NBA deputy commissioner Adam Silver.

The union and owners met again on September 13 but the negotiation soon collapsed. The salary cap structure remained the main source of disagreement. Owners wanted to create a hard cap for team payroll. The union wanted to keep the current structure intact, referring to it as a "blood issue". Players were willing to cut salary only if owners agree to compromise on the salary cap. But owners were unwilling to concede, saying that there must be a system in place that allows all teams to compete. Five of the sports agents—Arn Tellem, Bill Duffy, Mark Bartelstein, Jeff Schwartz, and Dan Fegan—who represent one-third of NBA players spoke with each other about decertifying the union. They believed owners have most of the leverage in negotiation and viewed decertification as a way for players to take control. Hunter said however that players had not considered decertification at this point.

On September 15, Fisher sent an email to 400-plus players asking for unity. In the email, he said that recent meetings were "effective". He suggested that the failure of having a deal was not due to disagreement between players and owners, but due to disagreement among owners. Fisher also used the opportunity to counter agents' suggestion of disbanding the union, saying that they were not making "a drastic move that leaves players without a union". According to sources, there was indeed disagreement among the owners. Some thought players' proposal of taking 52% of BRI was fair, and were willing to compromise on things like tying players' future earnings to NBA's future revenue growth and maintaining current salary level. Cavaliers' Dan Gilbert and Suns' Robert Sarver were among the hardliners who oppose the deal while Knicks' James Dolan and the Lakers' Jerry Buss were among the group in favor of it. Stern denied that there was a rift among owners the following day, saying, "I don't know what the basis of Derek's belief is."

=== Cancellations ===
On September 23, 2011, the NBA canceled training camp, which was to begin October 3, and the first week of preseason games, which were to run October 9 through 15. The incident marked only the second time in league history that games had been lost to a labor stoppage. Both the owners and the union had planned to meet on September 30 in New York and pledged to continue through the weekends if progress was being made. A source close to the situation leaked to ESPN that Stern planned to threaten the cancellation of the season if no deal was made, but the union saw this as a scare tactic and not a serious threat. Commentators speculated that Stern wanted to put pressure on the players and prevent negotiation from dragging through the fall. The meeting on September 30 was tense as Dwyane Wade reportedly yelled at Stern after he pointed his finger at Wade. The players nearly stormed out, but they remained in the meeting only after Hunter asked them to. Stern also backed down from his earlier threat that he would cancel the season if there was no deal.

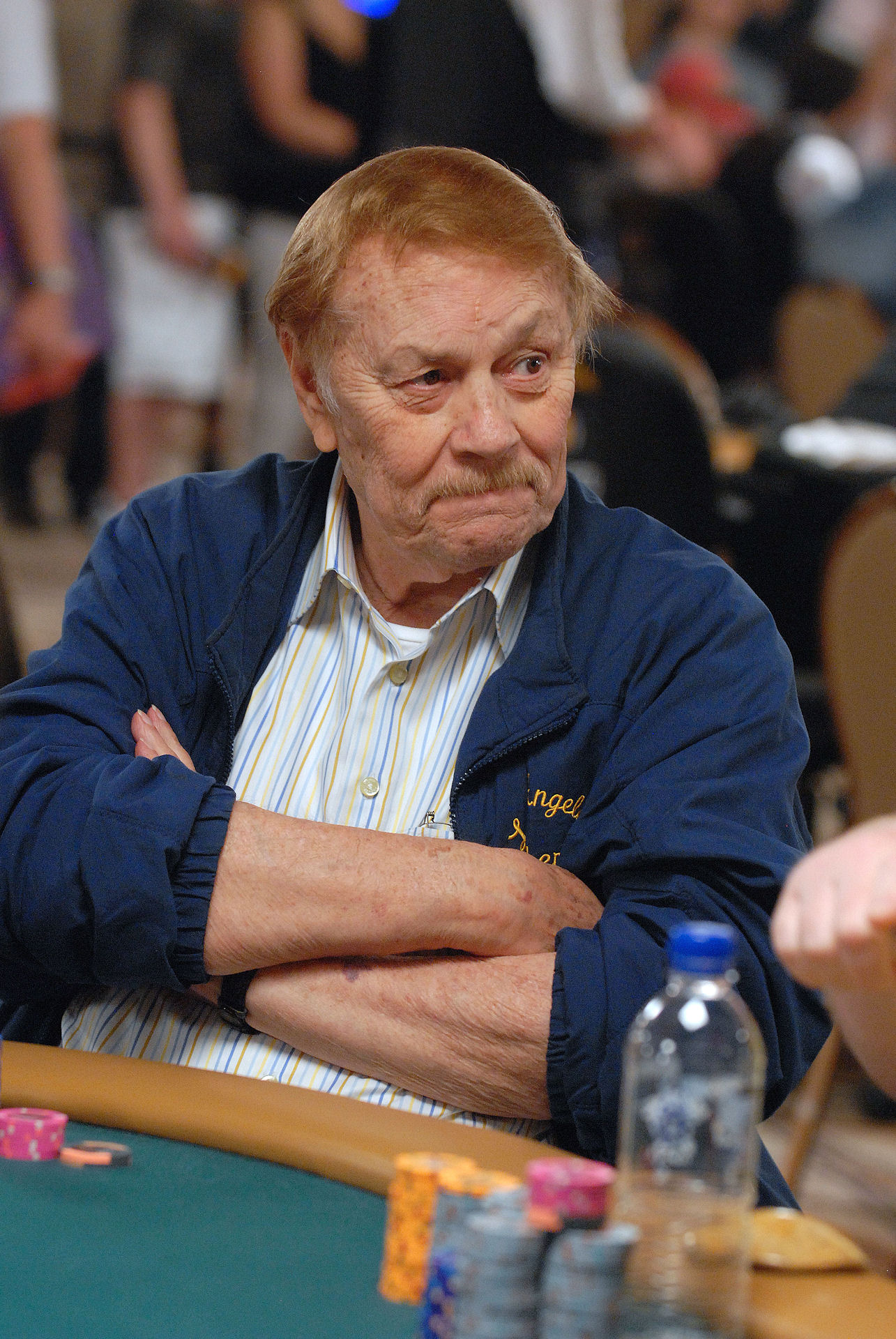
Lakers owner Jerry Buss was open to sharing a larger share of revenues with players.

On October 4, the NBA canceled the remainder of the preseason. Stern said the league would lose $200 million by canceling the preseason, and warned that the first two weeks of the season would be in jeopardy if no deal was reached by October 10. The players proposed that they receive 53% of BRI, while the owners countered with 47%. The two sides then discussed a 50–50 split of BRI, with the owners offering the players 49% of BRI with incentives that would raise the value to 51%. The players countered by asking for 51%, which would increase to 53 percent using those same incentives. It was rejected by the owners. Attempts for the sides to meet on October 7 failed. The union said the NBA demanded a 50–50 revenue split prior to the meeting, while the league refuted making any such demands. After talks on October 9 and 10, the two sides were unable to reach a deal and Stern subsequently canceled the first two weeks of regular-season games, which were originally scheduled to begin on November 1. BRI remained the main issue, but other differences included luxury tax, player contract length, and the mid-level exception. The owners proposed a $2 tax for every $1 that a team spent above the tax threshold for player salaries. The tax would rise to as high as $4 for every $1 above the limit for teams that were repeat offenders. The previous CBA in comparison called for a $1 tax for every $1 over the limit. The players refused to accept a hard salary cap, which they felt the more punitive luxury taxes would effectively create. Stern said the owners felt a harsher luxury tax would make the league more competitive. Wade countered that a small-market team like the San Antonio Spurs had won multiple championships. Andrew Zimbalist, an economist at Smith College, said that "the statistical correlation between payroll and win percentage is practically nonexistent" in the NBA. ESPN concluded that a team's draft efficiency accounted for 34% of its winning percentage in the past decade, while payroll showed only a 7% correlation. The New York Times noted that a fairer system was needed for the small-market teams, but the league's popularity historically relied on predictably successful teams with multiple superstars.

NBPA leaders met with around 30 players on October 14 and stressed unity. Washington Wizards player JaVale McGee left the meeting early and told reporters there were some players "saying that they're ready to fold", but the majority was united. McGee later denied mentioning that players were ready to fold, but his comment was recorded by reporters. Fisher said McGee had "no ability to make that statement" based on the limited time he spent at the meeting.

Owners and players met again on October 18–20 for 30 hours of talks over three days. They met before a federal mediator, George Cohen—the director of the Federal Mediation and Conciliation Service. Cohen tried unsuccessfully to resolve the 2011 NFL lockout. At the conclusion of the meetings, the sides remained split on the revenue split and the structure of the salary cap. The league proposed a 50–50 split of BRI, and the players proposed a range that would allow them as low as 50% of BRI to a maximum of 53%, depending on the league's revenues. Gilbert told the players to trust that the salary cap issues could be resolved if they accepted the 50–50 proposal. Hunter responded, "I can't trust your gut. I got to trust my own gut." Silver and San Antonio Spurs owner Peter Holt told reporters that the players refused to negotiate after the 50–50 proposal. Fisher told the press "that you guys were lied to" by the owners. Hunter said the owners told them, "Take it or leave it." Cohen decided that there was "no useful purpose" to continue mediation. Tentative agreements were reached on smaller issues, allowing a one-time exemption for teams to waive players without counting against the salary cap, granting teams an annual exemption to waive players and prorate the impact to the salary cap over multiple years, and a mid-level exception of $5 million.

Hunter characterized the small-market owners as being inflexible in negotiation. However, The New York Times wrote that the views of individual owners "cannot be easily categorized by market size, revenue, personal wealth or championship aspirations". Dallas Mavericks owner Mark Cuban, whose team was in the fifth-largest market and had one of the highest payrolls, and Portland Trail Blazers owner Paul Allen, the 23rd-wealthiest person in America, were as interested as small-market owners in changing the economy of the NBA in an effort to increase competition. While owners of profitable teams like Buss and Dolan were willing to accept modest changes to the CBA, they remained united with the small-market teams based on concerns for the league's long-term health.

Despite the earlier cancellation announcement, the players and the league hoped that a full 82-game schedule could be salvaged if a deal was reached in time. On October 28, Stern announced the cancellation of all games through November 30 after negotiations regarding division of revenue ended without an agreement. He said that Hunter was unwilling "to go a penny below 52%" on BRI, while Hunter stated, "We made a lot of concessions, but unfortunately at this time it's not enough." Stern indicated that an 82-game season was no longer possible. He added that a tentative agreement was reached for maximum contract lengths of five years for players staying with their teams or four years when signing with another team.

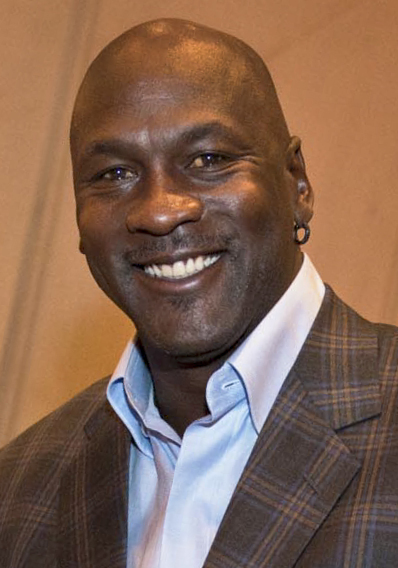
Hornets owner Michael Jordan, a former player, was among the hardline owners during negotiations.

Reports of division among players and owners surfaced. Jason Whitlock of Foxsports.com wrote that Fisher was privately working with Stern on the 50–50 split and that Hunter confronted Fisher about the issue. Fisher and Stern denied a private meeting took place. In a letter to the players, Fisher called the reports "absurd" and demanded "a retraction for the libelous and defamatory stories" through his attorneys. Hunter said his "relationship with Derek [was] very good. There was no confrontation". Fisher, as union president, was not empowered to make unilateral decisions for the union. While Fisher believed a 50–50 deal could be considered, Hunter maintained that the owners should never "make the same or more than the players". Miami Heat owner Micky Arison, one of the owners willing to settle with players, responded to a fan complaining about greedy owners and players on Twitter, saying that "You are barking at the wrong owner." He was fined $500,000 by Stern, five times larger than any previous amount against an owner for publicly commenting on the labor situation. Washington Wizards owner Ted Leonsis and Charlotte Bobcats owner Michael Jordan had been previously fined $100,000 each for public comments on the lockout. Leonsis had commented about the owners' desire for a hard salary cap, while Jordan told an Australian newspaper that the league's business model was "broken", citing the owners' desire for revenue sharing. A group of 10 to 14 hardline owners, led by Jordan, wanted to cap the players' share of BRI at 50% and as low as 47. During the labor dispute in 1998, then-player Jordan told Washington Wizards then-owner Abe Pollin, "If you can't make a profit, you should sell your team." Whitlock called Jordan a "sellout" wanting "current players to pay for his incompetence". He cited Jordan's executive decisions to draft disappointing players Kwame Brown and Adam Morrison.

In early November, about 50 players renewed talks of union decertification if the union went lower than 52.5% of BRI or agreed to additional restrictions on contracts, salary-cap exceptions, or free agency. Decertifying would require that 30% of the union—about 130 players—sign a petition, allowing an election under the auspices of the NLRB by all NBPA members to decertify with a simple majority. The NLRB traditionally did not consider a decertification petition while a charge was pending, such as the NBPA's unfair labor practice charges filed in August.

The owners and players union met on November 6, and they were joined again by federal mediator Cohen. The players proposed that they receive 51% of BRI, with a 1% portion taken out for retired players. The owners offered a "band" that would pay the players 49 to 51%, depending on revenue growth. Jeff Kessler, the union's attorney, said the league's proposal was really 50.2% and called the possibility of reaching 51% an "illusion". The league also proposed restrictions for teams that pay the luxury tax, banning them from sign and trade deals and limiting their use of the mid-level exception. They also proposed a "repeater tax" for teams that exceed the tax threshold thrice in a five-year span. Stern issued an ultimatum, giving the players until November 9 to accept the deal before it was lowered to 47% BRI and a flex salary cap.

On November 15, the NBA canceled all games through December 15.

=== Dissolving the union ===
The union rejected the offer on November 9 and asked for another bargaining session. The two sides met again as the deadline passed. After two days of negotiation, the owners put forth a revised final offer and said that they were done bargaining. If accepted by the players, Stern hoped to start a 72-game season in mid December. On November 14, the union rejected the last offer and dissolved the union. The NBPA was converted into a trade association, enabling the players as individual employees to participate in a class action antitrust lawsuit against the league, calling the lockout an illegal group boycott. Attorney David Boies, who represented the NFL owners in their 2011 lockout, agreed to represent the players and join Keesler, who also represented the players in the NFL lockout. On November 15, one group of NBA players (including Carmelo Anthony, Chauncey Billups, Kawhi Leonard, and Leon Powe) filed an antitrust lawsuit against the NBA in a California federal court, while another (including Anthony Tolliver, Ben Gordon, Caron Butler and Derrick Williams) filed their own suit against the NBA in a Minnesota federal court. November 15 was also the day players were to receive their first paychecks if the season was played.

On November 21, the California lawsuit was dropped in order to merge with the Minnesota lawsuit. Boies hoped that the move would speed up the process, since the courts would likely merge the suits as they were similar complaints seeking the same outcome.

=== Settlement ===
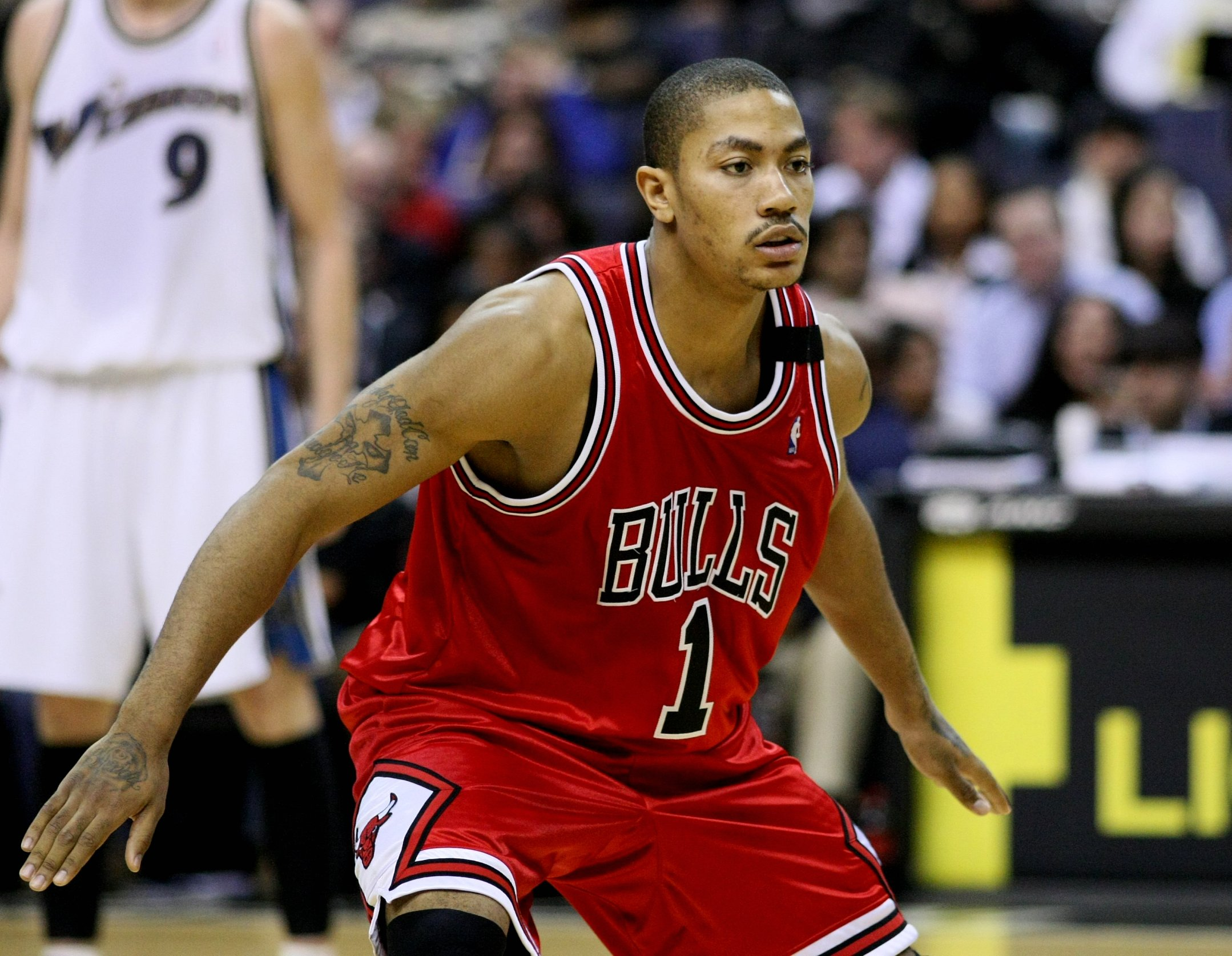
In a rule named after Derrick Rose, accomplished players coming off their rookie contract could earn more money in the new CBA.

On November 23, the league and the players agreed to resume negotiating on November 25. On November 26, after 15 hours of talks, a tentative deal was reached. The NBPA re-formed as a union on December 1, receiving support from over 300 players, exceeding the requirement for at least 260 signatures. Signature cards were sent to the roughly 440 players on rosters at the end of the previous season, as well as to the 60 rookies drafted in 2011 and to players who signed at least two 10-day contracts. The re-formation enabled further negotiations with the league on secondary issues such as the age limit for the NBA draft and rules on players being sent to and recalled from the NBA D-League. The players and owners concluded their voting on the deal on December 8, when the deal was ratified, and the lockout ended after 161 days. The owners approved the deal by a 25–5 vote, while 86% of the more than 200 players who voted approved the deal. The Miami Heat's Micky Arison and the Dallas Mavericks' Mark Cuban were the two owners who publicly disclosed that they voted against the new CBA.

The players would receive 51.2% of BRI in 2011–12, with a 49-to-51 band in subsequent years. Teams were allowed a one-time amnesty exemption to waive one player and remove him from the team's salary cap. The player could be claimed off waivers by the highest bidder; the waiving team would be responsible for the remaining salary without it counting against their cap. In a rule dubbed the "Derrick Rose Rule" after the 2011 NBA Most Valuable Player Award winner, a player finishing his rookie contract could be re-signed at up to 30% of his team's salary cap—an increase from the previous CBA's 25%—if he was either a two-time All-Star starter, twice voted All-NBA Team, or won an MVP award. The maximum salary for a player otherwise would remain unchanged at 25, 30, or 35% of the salary cap, depending on the player's years of service.

Collective Bargaining Agreement comparisons
Characteristic	2005	2011
Length of agreement	7 years, with league opt-out option in 2011	10 years, with opt-out in 2017 by either side
Revenue split	Players: 57% Owners: 43%	Players: 49–51% Owners: 49–51%
Minimum team salary	75% of salary cap	85–90%
Luxury tax	$1 for every $1 above the luxury-tax threshold	Incrementally increase from 1:1 for every $5 million above the threshold
Limits on tax-paying teams	None	Smaller midlevel exception, limits on salary acquired in a trade, and no bi-annual exception.
Maximum new contract length	Larry Bird exception: 6 years with 10.5 percent raises for Bird free agents Others: 5 years with 8 percent raises.	Larry Bird exception: 5 years with 7.5 percent raises Others: 4 years with 4.5 percent raises
Max contract extension length	Rookies: 5 years Others: 5 years, which included years remaining on existing contract	Rookies: 4 years, with each team allowed one designated player at 5 years for maximum salary Others: 4 years, which included years remaining on existing contract
Maximum contract salary	Approximately 25, 30 or 35 percent of the salary cap, depending on the player's years of service.	Same as 2005, but some players coming off their rookie contract qualified for the 30 percent maximum if they met certain criteria.
Midlevel exception	Five years starting at the average salary ($5.765 million in 2010–11), with 8 percent raises.	Non-tax paying teams: Four years starting at $5 million (base salary grew by 3 percent annually beginning in 2013–14), with 4.5 percent raises. Tax paying teams: Three years, a $3 million base salary (which grew by 3 percent annually beginning in 2013–14) and 4.5 percent raises. Teams with cap room: Previously had no midlevel exception. Now received a new exception that was for two years and started at $2.5 million (growing 3 percent annually).
Trades	Teams over the cap could acquire a maximum of 125 percent plus $100,000 of the salaries they trade away. A team could receive a maximum of $3 million cash per trade.	Tax paying teams: Same as 2005. Starting in 2013–14, teams exceeding the tax threshold by more than $4 million could not receive a player in a sign-and-trade transaction. Non-tax paying teams: Could acquire up to the lesser of 150 percent plus $100,000, or 100 percent plus $5 million of the salaries they trade away. The maximum cash a team could pay or receive in trade was $3 million annually.
Escrow	8 percent (in 2010–11) withheld to ensure players received the correct revenue split. If escrow withholding was insufficient, the following season's salaries were reduced to compensate.	10 percent withheld annually. If the withholding was insufficient, the difference was deducted from the players' retirement benefits and not the following season's salary.
Amnesty	One player could be waived prior to the start of the 2005–06 season. The salary of the waived player did not count toward the luxury tax.	One player could be waived prior to the start of any season, but only once during the agreement. Only players signed under the 2005 CBA were eligible. The salary of the waived player did not count toward the salary cap or luxury tax.

=== Racial comments ===
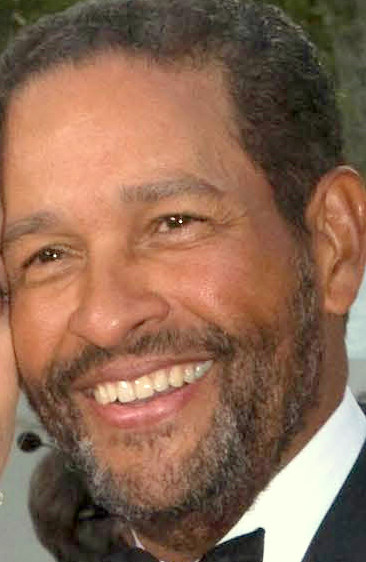
Journalist Bryant Gumbel evoked slavery in his lockout editorial.

Bryant Gumbel on his HBO Real Sports show in October likened Stern's role in the lockout to a "modern plantation overseer, treating NBA men as if they were his boys ... keeping the hired hands in their place". The NBA owners were predominantly white, while the players were mostly black. ESPN noted that William C. Rhoden in his book $40 Million Slaves had earlier dealt with the topic of players as "slaves" in spite of earning millions of dollars. Stern dismissed Gumbel's comments as "an occupational hazard" of being the NBA commissioner. In early November, NBPA attorney Jeffrey L. Kessler criticized the owners' "take it or leave it" bargaining approach: "instead of treating the players like partners, they're treating them like plantation workers." Hall of Famer Magic Johnson called the comments "ridiculous" and defended Stern's record of promoting black people and players. ESPN The Magazine said that the NBPA did not condone Kessler's statements, and they had intentionally avoided getting involved with Gumbel's earlier remarks. Kessler later apologized for his comments.

=== Impact ===
The revised season schedule with 16 fewer regular-season games and a reduced pre-season caused an estimated loss of $400 million for both the team owners and the players . According to CNBC, the average player lost $220,000 after the first missed paycheck on November 15. However, each player did receive $100,000 from the NBA to compensate for salaries falling below the 57% BRI level in 2010–11. As of October 25, an estimated 400 NBA jobs were lost due to layoffs and attrition since the lockout—around 200 in the league office and another 200 among the 30 teams. As the lockout dragged on toward the holiday season, many NBA arenas workers felt the effect. Many of them worked part-time in order to supplement their income or to simply pay bills and they were unable to recover lost wages that resulted from cancelled games.

== Players' alternatives ==
=== Going overseas ===
The players union encouraged players to find work overseas, hoping owners would offer better deals if they saw players having more options. Josh Childress, who played for Greek team Olympiacos before returning to the NBA in 2010, said he would not consider playing overseas during the lockout. He cited concerns with reliability of getting paid, differences in coaching styles, and lower standards of business travel compared to the NBA. The International Basketball Federation (FIBA) announced on July 29 that it would allow players under NBA contracts to play overseas, provided that the contracts they signed had opt-out clauses that allowed players to return once the work stoppage ended. Stern said the league would allow players to play overseas, but he warned that it could divide the union and possibly jeopardize players' contracts if they were seriously injured. Most leagues permitted the signing of locked-out NBA players with the option of opting out; the Chinese Basketball Association, however, only allowed its clubs to sign foreign free agents who could play for at least the entire season. Chinese nationals were exempt from this rule; this allowed Yi Jianlian to return to the NBA upon the end of the lockout.

NBA All-Stars signing overseas
Player	Date signed	New team	NBA team	Ref.
(United States) Deron Williams	July 16	Beşiktaş Milangaz (Turkey)	New Jersey Nets	
(Turkey) Mehmet Okur	September 20	Türk Telekom (Turkey)	Utah Jazz	
(United States) Kenyon Martin	September 21	Xinjiang Flying Tigers (China)	Denver Nuggets	
(Russia) Andrei Kirilenko	October 4	CSKA Moscow (Russia)	Utah Jazz	
(France) Tony Parker	October 5	ASVEL Basket (France)	San Antonio Spurs	
For the list of all NBA players who went overseas, see 2011–12 NBA season transactions § Going overseas.

More than 90 players decided to sign with foreign teams during the lockout. The New York Times called the migration of players overseas "one of the most overblown stories of the lockout" with a majority of those signing being "rookies, middling veterans and fringe players". Deron Williams was the only 2011 All-Star going overseas, signing a one-year contract for $5 million to play for Beşiktaş of the Turkish Basketball League. Former first overall draft pick Kenyon Martin, a free agent, signed a one-year contract with the Xinjiang Flying Tigers of the Chinese Basketball Association that would make him the highest paid player in the league's history at $500,000 a month. Unlike players who signed more lucrative contracts overseas, three-time NBA champion Tony Parker opted to play for the minimum wage of $2,000 per month with ASVEL Basket, the French team he partly owned. Parker joined several foreign players, such as Leandro Barbosa, Boris Diaw, Rudy Fernández, Andrei Kirilenko and Mehmet Okur, who opted to play in their home countries until the lockout ended.

An NBA player playing in Europe could earn as little as $50,000–$75,000 per month, while the average NBA annual salary was $5.8 million with the minimum around $500,000. The large contracts signed by Williams and Martin were extreme exceptions. In October after the cancellation of regular season games, it was not anticipated that many additional NBA players would be signed overseas; leagues had started playing, their rosters were full, and new players could disrupt the teams.

=== Other alternatives ===
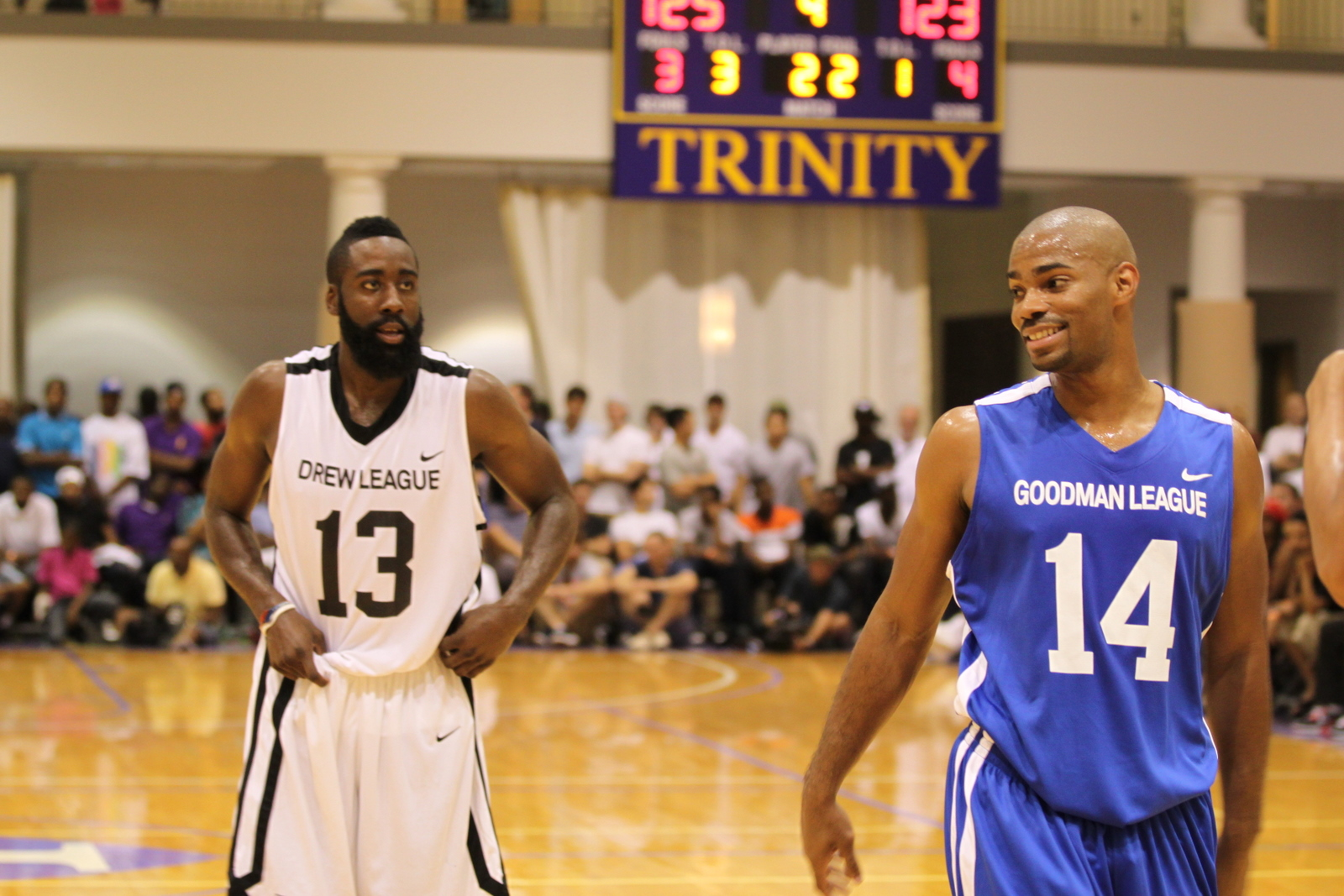
The Drew-Goodman game was one of the many exhibition basketball games played during the lockout. Here are James Harden (left) for the Drew League and Gary Neal (right) for the Goodman League.

Many players opted to stay in the United States instead. The New York Times speculated that many Americans would have found it hard to leave and change their lifestyle. Some played in local pick-up games, while others ranging from stars like Kevin Durant to players like Dorell Wright played in the more organized exhibition tournaments such as the Drew League in Los Angeles, the Melo League located in Baltimore, and the Goodman League in Washington, D.C. An exhibition game between two of the leagues was played on August 20, 2011, with the Goodman League defeating the Drew League, 135–134. Drew commissioner Dino Smiley said such pro–am games during the NBA off-season were not new, but that "the lockout has taken these games to a new level". A tournament of NBA-only players was held in September in Las Vegas, Nevada, featuring eight teams with seven to eight players each. Named the Impact Basketball Competitive Training Series, the league was dubbed by The New York Times as the "Lockout League".

Training camp was not expected to be long if there ended up being a season. Some players organized workouts for their teams to build team chemistry. The NBPA announced it was setting up workout centers in Las Vegas, Los Angeles, Houston and possibly Miami for players to work out at the union's expense.

The continuing lockout in October and the canceled preseason allowed Renaldo Balkman, José Juan Barea, and Carlos Arroyo to play for Puerto Rico in the Pan American Games that month. Puerto Rico won the gold medal.

== Outside impact ==
=== Olympics ===
Although the 2012 Olympic men's basketball tournament was then more than a year away, qualifying tournaments in all five of FIBA's continental zones were to be held in the Northern Hemisphere summer of 2011 (the traditional basketball offseason throughout the world). The lockout resulted in the suspension of an agreement between the NBA and FIBA by which the NBA would take on most of the costs for insuring the value of its players' contracts in the event they were injured during international competition. As a result, national federations that wish to have NBA players on their squads must now provide full coverage instead of supplemental insurance.

These costs are surprisingly high—one agent who represents an unnamed NBA player set to earn $10 million in the 2010–11 season said the player had received a $400,000 quote to insure his contract for his national team's FIBA qualifier. The Spanish Basketball Federation said that insuring all the NBA players on its national team for EuroBasket 2011, which doubles as the European Olympic qualifiers, could cost as much as $5.67 million. Basketball Australia announced that Andrew Bogut would not be available for the 2011 FIBA Oceania Championship; his agent indicated that the final deal-breaker was when insurers stated that they would not insure his remaining $39 million in NBA salary unless pre-existing elbow, wrist, and back injuries were excluded from the policy.

The French, Russian, and Argentine federations were able to insure their NBA players, and several other federations were also expected to be able to do so. Over 30 NBA players participated in EuroBasket 2011, while Ben Gordon and Marcin Gortat opted out due to insurance concerns.

=== Other sports ===
A couple of weeks before the NBA season was originally scheduled to start, Reuters and Bloomberg Businessweek speculated on the prospect of increased interest in the National Hockey League (NHL) among NBA fans. The NHL had experienced steady growth since the 2005–06 season after their own lockout canceled the league's 2004–05 season. They again opened the 2011–12 season in early October to record crowds. Businessweek wrote, "Just maybe, the NBA's sketchy situation is already having a positive effect on the NHL." However several NHL teams (nearly half of which do not have an NBA team in their market) had no plans to market directly to NBA fans during the lockout.

The University of Texas at San Antonio (UTSA), in its inaugural college football season, drew 40,000 fans to its games in September. The San Antonio Business Journal speculated on UTSA's opportunities to grow its fan base with the canceled NBA games in San Antonio.

Boston Herald speculated that NCAA college basketball would have higher television ratings and attendance during the lockout. However, Sporting News noted that "there was no obvious boost in popularity in the college game" during the previous lockout when college basketball attendance increased by an average of 21 people per game.

=== NBA cities ===
Mayors from 14 NBA cities wrote an open letter to NBA commissioner David Stern and NBPA chief Billy Hunter, requesting that they end the lockout based on "the perspective [of city] residents and the negative impact a canceled season might have on them, our cities, and our local economies". Time noted that arena workers would be affected by the cancellation of games. However, separate studies by University of Maryland, Baltimore County and Lake Forest College found no historic significant effect to the economies of cities with sports franchises affected by work stoppages. Explanations included consumer shifting of spending on sporting events to other forms of entertainment, reduced local government spending on crowd and traffic control, and higher productivity by the general workforce without the distraction of games.

=== Other businesses ===
It was estimated that a complete lockout had cost an upwards of $1 billion in lost television advertisement revenue. The lockout had dealt a sizable blow to the current licensed product market which was estimated at $2.7 billion, and had created a big loss in television ratings for networks that cover NBA games such as the regional sports networks, TNT, and ESPN.

== Rescheduled season ==
The NBA revised the schedule to play two preseason games and a 66-game regular season schedule per team rather than the standard seven preseason games and an 82-game regular season schedule. Teams were allowed to contact players' agents on November 30. Players could begin working out voluntarily at team facilities with trainers on December 1, but coaches and general managers were not allowed to observe the workouts nor could any drills be conducted. NBA teams began talking to free agents on December 5, 2011, at 10 a.m. EST. Training camps and free agency started on December 9 with the regular season beginning on Christmas Day with five games, two more than the original schedule. ESPN/ABC analyst Jeff Van Gundy said about the NBA opening on Christmas Day: "It's a different opening day than has ever happened in the past and Christmas Day games have always been a big day for the NBA. This unique situation combined with the unveiling of a championship banner for the Mavericks in a finals rematch, and then to see the Lakers and the debut of Mike Brown as head coach, those things are all going to be very compelling."

The league built a new schedule from scratch based on available arena dates. In October, the league had allowed arenas in Los Angeles and Chicago to reassign NBA dates for other events. The number of games between conferences was affected as was the case in the 1999 lockout, when each team played only five or six interconference games in a 50-game schedule. Normally, each team plays teams in the other conference twice each. Teams played 48 conference games and 18 non-conference games in a 66-game schedule, compared to 52 conference games and 30 non-conference games in a normal 82-game season. Teams played on average two more games per month and also played three-consecutive games at least once in the season. In total, the league had 42 sets of back-to-back-to-back games, with 11 teams playing two such sets. The three-game set, or "triple", had not occurred since the shortened 1999 season, which featured 64 triples and sloppier play due to tired players. Before that, the last occurrence was two decades earlier. During the season, there were 29 occasions when teams played five games in six days.

With fewer off days during the season, the level of play was lower due to fatigue, and some older players rested to avoid burnout and recuperate from injuries. When the San Antonio Spurs rested Tim Duncan for a game in March at the end of a back-to-back-to-back, coach Gregg Popovich submitted the description of Duncan's absence as "Old". Nonetheless, some players still sustained injuries. In the 2012 playoffs, the Chicago Bulls were eliminated after losing Derrick Rose and Joakim Noah to injuries, and the New York Knicks lost to the Miami Heat while losing Baron Davis and Iman Shumpert to knee injuries. The Heat were not immune, losing Chris Bosh for most of the playoffs en route to their NBA championship. Stern initially said there was no connection between the injuries and the 66-game schedule compressed into 124 days; however, he backed off those comments a week later, saying more research was needed.

== See also ==
- Suspension of the 2019-20 NBA season
- 1998–99 NBA lockout
