= Finnigan =

Finnigan is a surname, a variant of Finnegan. Notable people with the surname include:

- Annette Finnigan (1873–1940), American suffragette and philanthropist
- Brian Finnigan, founder of the house of Finnigans
- Charles Finnigan, surgeon, rear-admiral and dental surgeon in the United Kingdom's Royal Navy
- Eddie Finnigan, ice hockey player
- Frank Finnigan, ice hockey player
- Jennifer Finnigan, Canadian actress
- Mike Finnigan (1945–2021), American rock keyboardist and singer
- Robert E. Finnigan, American scientist

== Fictional characters ==
- Seamus Finnigan, a character in the Harry Potter series

== See also ==
- Finnigan Sinister, one half of the 2000 AD hitman duo Sinister Dexter
- Finnigan Fox, an upcoming video game for the Intellivision Amico
- Finnegan (disambiguation)
