= Finnegan =

Finnegan may refer to:

== Characters ==
- Finnegan (Star Trek), a minor fictional character in Star Trek
- Finnegan, the dog puppet from the Mr. Dressup television show

== Other ==
- Finnegan (surname), including a list of people with the name
- Finnegan, Alberta, an unincorporated community in Canada
- Finnegan Foundation, Pennsylvania education organization
- Finnegan, Henderson, Farabow, Garrett & Dunner, intellectual property law firm
- USS Finnegan (DE-307), Evarts-class U.S. destroyer escort

== See also ==
- Finnigan
- Finnegan's Wake (disambiguation)
