= Joseph Finnegan =

Joseph Finnegan may refer to:

- Joseph Finegan (1814–1885), sometimes Finnegan, American businessman and general
- Joseph Finnegan (senator) (1898–1962), member of the Massachusetts State Senate from 1930 to 1934, namesake of Senator Joseph Finnegan Park
- Joseph F. Finnegan (1904–1964), American labor mediator
- Joseph Finnegan (cryptographer) (1905–1980), American linguist and cryptographer
- Joseph Finnegan (judge) (1942–2023), judge of the Supreme Court of Ireland
