= Michael Finnegan =

Michael Finnegan or Finnigan may refer to:

- Michael C. Finnegan (born 1955), former Chief of Staff for New York Governor George Pataki
- Michael Finnegan (Belizean politician), Minister of Housing from Belize
- Michael Finnegan (anthropologist), professor of anthropology at Kansas State University
- Mike Finnigan (1945–2021), American keyboard player
- "Michael Finnegan" (song), Irish folk song
