= National Anthem of the Ancient Britons =

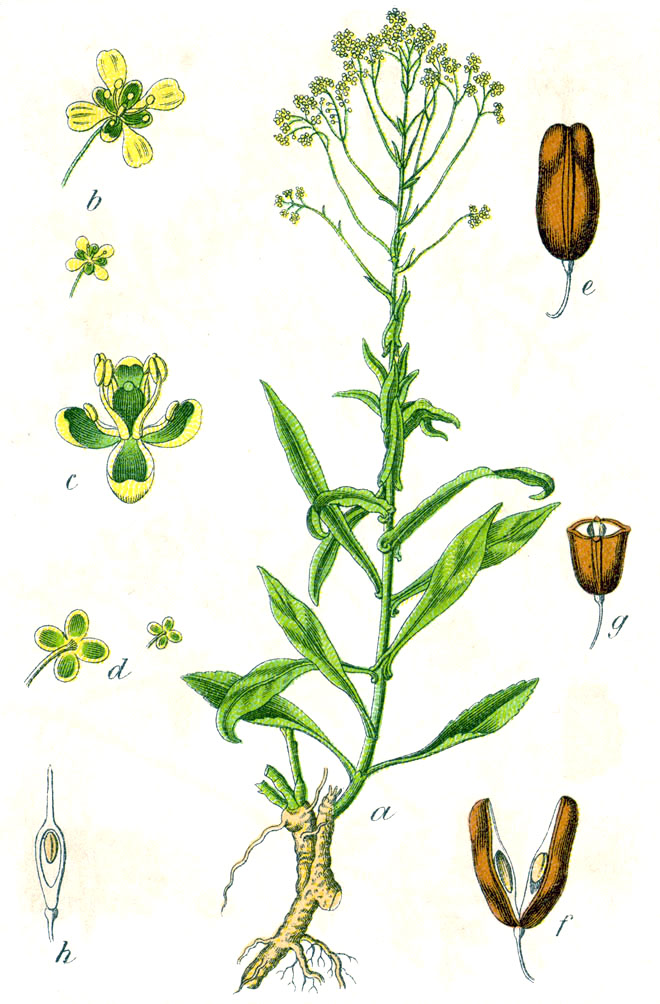
- The Woad plant

Song
- Published: 1921
- Composer(s): music from Men of Harlech
- Lyricist(s): William Hope-Jones

"National Anthem of the Ancient Britons", also known as "Woad" or "The Woad Ode", is a humorous song, set to the tune of "Men of Harlech". It first became popular in the 1920s as a song in the British Boy Scouts and appeared in The Hackney Scout Song Book (Stacy & Son Ltd, 1921). The author was William Hope-Jones, a housemaster at Eton, who wrote it some time before 1914, as he sang it at a college dinner at that time. "Ho Jo" appears in M. R. James' 1928 ghost story "Wailing Well", in which a group of masters take the Eton Scout Troop on an ill-fated camping expedition. The song recounts the ancient British tradition of fighting naked, dyed with woad. It has also been known as "The Woad Song" and "Woad of Harlech".

== Lyrics ==
1.
What's the good of wearing braces,
Vests and pants and boots with laces,
Spats or hats you buy in places
Down in Brompton Road?

What's the use of shirts of cotton,
Studs that always get forgotten?
These affairs are simply rotten:
Better far is woad.

Woad's the stuff to show, men.
Woad to scare your foemen:
Boil it to a brilliant hue
And rub it on your back and your abdomen.

Ancient Briton ne'er did hit on
Anything as good as woad to fit on
Neck, or knees, or where you sit on.
Tailors, you be blowed.

2.
Romans came across the Channel
All wrapped up in tin and flannel:
Half a pint of woad per man'll
Dress us more than these.

Saxons, you can waste your stitches
Building beds for bugs in britches:
We have woad to clothe us, which is
Not a nest for fleas.

Romans keep your armours;
Saxons your pyjamas:
Hairy coats were meant for goats,
Gorillas, yaks, retriever dogs and llamas.

Tramp up Snowdon with our woad on:
Never mind if we get rained or blowed on.
Never want a button sewed on.
Go it, Ancient Bs.

== Variants ==
Last-line variations include: "Go it, Ancient Britons", "If you stick to Woad", "Bottoms up to woad", "W - O - A - D", "Good for us today", "Go it Ancient Brits", "Woad for us today!" and "Bollocks to the breeze!"

The song appeared in a YHA Songbook from the Youth Hostels Association in the early 1970s. A version of the song appears in the 2009 novel Skin Overcoat by British author Skee Morif.

== Published versions ==
- The Hackney Scout Song Book (Stacy & Son Ltd, ten editions; 1921 to 1972).
- Dick and Beth Best The New Song Fest. Intercollegiate Outing Club Association, 1961. May be in 1948 and 1955 editions also.
- Anthony Hopkins Songs from the Front and Rear: Canadian Servicemen's Songs of the Second World War. 1979 ISBN 0-88830-171-5
- Skee Morif Skin Overcoat. 2009 ISBN 0-9552841-2-0

== Recordings ==
- Joe Hickerson with a Gathering of Friends Folk Legacy 2002
- Oak, Ash & Thorn Sowing Wild Oats & Out On a Limb
- Chance & The Lucky Aces 'National Anthem of the Ancient Britons', from the EP Lunch with Chance & The Lucky Aces (2025)
