= Wayne L. Horvitz =

American labor negotiator

Wayne Louis Horvitz (October 8, 1920 – June 17, 2009) was an American labor negotiator, who served as director of the Federal Mediation and Conciliation Service, where he played a major role in resolving and preventing major strikes in business and industries nationwide.

== Early life and career ==
Horvitz was born on October 8, 1920, in Chicago, Illinois, the only child of Gertrude Wayne Horvitz and Aaron Horvitz, who had himself been a prominent labor negotiator and was the first president of the National Academy of Arbitrators. He grew up in Mount Vernon, New York, and attended Bard College, graduating in 1942. Horvitz served in the United States Army during World War II in North Africa and Italy. Following the completion of his military service, Horvitz attended the MIT Sloan School of Management, where he earned a Master of Science degree in 1953 in industrial management.

== Labor negotiation ==
His opened an office in Phoenix, Arizona, as a labor-management arbitrator, and then was employed by the Matson Navigation Company in San Francisco as its vice president for industrial relations from 1960 to 1967. After several years working independently in the field in Washington, D.C., Horvitz was hired by the supermarket industry in 1974 to serve as chairman of its labor-management committee.

=== Federal Mediation and Conciliation Service ===
He was named by President of the United States Jimmy Carter in April 1977 to serve as director of the Federal Mediation and Conciliation Service.

Averting a nationwide strike that would have started at midnight on August 7, 1977, Horvitz assisted in negotiations between the Communications Workers of America and the American Telephone & Telegraph. The $3.3 billion agreement would have wages and benefits increase 31% over the three-year life of the contract. AT&T's Bell Telephone System reached a similar agreement with the Telecommunications International Union and International Brotherhood of Electrical Workers. Horvitz called the agreement "a victory for collective bargaining" and an "example of what can be done when two responsible parties sit down together with the will to reach an agreement".

As part of the Carter Administration's efforts to avert a strike, Horvitz helped the United Mine Workers replace several senior positions of officials who had been fired by union president Arnold Miller, an action described by The New York Times as a "highly unusual move" that was intended to ensure that negotiations could only proceed successfully if the union had the organization it needed. Horvitz worked to negotiate an agreement between the UMW and coal industry to end the 110-day Bituminous Coal Strike of 1977–1978, in which workers would receive an increase of $2.35 per hour over their prior hourly base rate of $7.80, with combined wages and benefits increasing by 37% over the three-year contract. Later that year, Horvitz convinced Postmaster General William F. Bolger to present the Postal Service's final offer to the unions representing postal workers, with the parties reaching an agreement within an hour of Bolger's direct participation.

Horvitz played an active role in negotiating a new master freight agreement between the trucking industry and the Teamsters, ending a 10-day strike and lockout that had 300,000 drivers and other union employees out of work. As part of the agreement reached in April 1979, workers received an additional $1.50 per hour, with wages and benefits rising 30% in the three years of the contract. Horvitz served as mediator from the start of negotiations and praised both sides for resisting internal and external pressures to prolong the work stoppage. Later that year, Horvitz also played a direct role in "very difficult and complicated" negotiations towards reaching an agreement to end a 12-week-long strike by grain handlers the 600 workers represented by Local 118 of the American Federation of Grain Millers that brought an estimated $1 billion in losses to the farmer industry in the Upper Midwest.

Horvitz was sent by president Carter to mediate between the Metropolitan Opera and the American Guild of Musical Artists in a strike that had led the Met to announce the cancellation of its 1980–81 opera season. Horvitz described that "[b]oth sides are dug in now in ways that make it almost impossible to see daylight." The two sides reached an agreement after negotiating for three days after Horvitz became involved in the process.

== Personal ==
Horvitz died at age 88 on June 17, 2009, at his home in Washington, D.C., due to complications of cancer. His wife died in 2002, and a son died in 2005. He was survived by his companion, Judy Peabody, as well as three sons and three grandchildren.
