= J. Curtis Counts =

American lawyer

James Curtis Counts (August 2, 1915 – June 30, 1999) was a labor mediator who served as the sixth Director of the Federal Mediation and Conciliation Service, appointed by President of the United States Richard Nixon.

== Early life and education ==
Counts was born on August 2, 1915, in Goldfield, Colorado, where his father was a carpenter, and where his grandfather had mined gold. After settling briefly in Northern California, the family moved to Los Angeles when he was a child. In Los Angeles his father worked constructing sets for the Hollywood movie studios. Counts was a star athlete at Fairfax High School as a first baseman for the school's baseball team. He also played baseball at the University of California, Los Angeles, lettering three seasons and later inducted as a member in the inaugural class of the Bruin Baseball Hall of Fame. He graduated from UCLA in 1937 with a degree in political science.

Counts attended the University of Southern California Law School. While in law school, his girlfriend and future wife, Virginia Shugart, was the roommate of Pat Ryan, the girlfriend and future wife of Richard Nixon, and they first met each other at a party following the 1939 Rose Bowl in which Counts' USC team beat Duke University, where Nixon was attending law school. The two couples double dated, and the Nixons participated in the wedding party at the Counts wedding, and they remained longtime friends. Counts graduated with his law degree in 1941.

== Professional career ==
Counts was hired by Douglas Aircraft Company in Santa Monica, California in 1940. He started as a clerk, and entered a management training program, after which he ascended the corporate ladder to become the firm's director of employee relations in 1962. In 1964 he was named as a vice president at the company. He was actively involved in labor relations during his career, and was viewed as open-minded by his counterparts at the International Association of Machinists.

United States Secretary of Labor George P. Shultz selected Counts in 1969 to serve as Director of the Federal Mediation and Conciliation Service, insisting that Counts was selected based on his widely respected qualifications in the field, and not on his longtime connection to President Nixon. Serving in the position until 1973, Counts was given credit for expanding the service's ability to resolve labor disputes before they turned into strikes, dealing effectively with labor leaders such as Jimmy Hoffa of the Teamsters, AFL-CIO president George Meany and Walter Reuther of the United Auto Workers.

Early during his tenure, Counts played a role in resolving a three-month-long strike by the International Union of Electrical Workers against General Electric. After becoming involved in the strike on January 7, 1970, Counts met several times daily with each side, helping hammer out an agreement to end the labor stoppage. He also was involved in settling a strike by the International Longshoremen's Association that effectively closed ports on the East Coast of the United States, helping achieve settlements with locals in Boston and Texas.

After his service in the Nixon Administration, Counts worked as a management consultant, involved in collective bargaining in construction and trucking.

== Personal ==
Counts coached sandlot baseball teams, including players that had made it to the major leagues. A 1970 profile in The New York Times described Counts as someone who enjoyed eating, a fact he said "you can tell just by looking at me" and his "portly" 5'-10", 210 pounds (95 kg) body. He would cook breakfast for his family most mornings, and enjoyed cooking barbecue, Mexican food and omelets.

Counts died at age 83 on June 30, 1999, at his home in the Cheviot Hills section Los Angeles, California where he had lived for five decades. He was survived by two daughters, a son, nine grandchildren and four great-grandchildren. His wife, the former Virginia Shugart Counts, had died in 1996.
