= John Finegan =

John Finegan may refer to:

- Jack Finegan (1908–2000), biblical scholar
- John Finegan, wrestling referee, see List of former Extreme Championship Wrestling personnel

== See also ==
- John Finnegan (disambiguation)
