= William E. Simkin =

William Edward Simkin (January 13, 1907 – March 4, 1992) was an American labor mediator and private arbitrator who worked on resolving strikes in major nationwide industries as the longest-serving head of the Federal Mediation and Conciliation Service, the nation's top labor mediator.

== Early life and education ==
Simkin was born on January 13, 1907, in Merrifield, New York and was raised in Poplar Ridge, New York. He majored in engineering at Earlham College, but chose to pursue economics after taking a few courses in the subject during his senior year. He was principal of a high school in Sherwood, New York in 1928 and spent five years working for the American Friends Service Committee during the Great Depression, including time he spent teaching at the Brooklyn Friends School while attending Columbia University.

== Mediation and arbitration ==
He enrolled in the Wharton School of the University of Pennsylvania in 1937, majoring in economics. There he developed a relationship with one of his professors, George W. Taylor, and served as his assistant while Taylor was mediating a dispute in the Philadelphia hosiery industry. With the exception of wartime service working for the National War Labor Board, Simkin devoted the remainder of his career to arbitration.

A lifelong Quaker, Simkin was a patient man who spoke with a deep and soft voice, and was described by The New York Times as a peacemaker who "projected a soothing image that fit the part". Theodore W. Kheel, a fellow labor mediator, described Simkin called him "a giant among neutrals in labor relations, who was trusted by both sides and had that essential ingredient of common sense."

On January 27, 1961, President of the United States John F. Kennedy named Simkin to serve as the fifth Director of the Federal Mediation and Conciliation Service, with The New York Times describing him as "one of the best known arbitrators of labor-management problems in the country". He was sworn into office on March 31 in a ceremony held at the White House, with United States Secretary of Labor Arthur J. Goldberg remarking on Simkin's status as the first Quaker to hold the post.

As Director of the FMCS, Simkin played a major role in resolving disputes in industries from airlines to steel, with a focus on developing methods to resolve problems before they became crises and working with both labor and management in creating techniques to address their grievances. He was reappointed by President Lyndon Johnson, and served in the post until 1969, making him the longest-serving director of the Federal Mediation and Conciliation Service.

In private practice, Simkin served as an arbitrator assisting major corporations with difficult labor issues at companies including Bethlehem Steel, Goodyear and Greyhound Lines. While living in Tucson, Arizona, Simkin was appointed by then-FMCS Director William Usery, Jr. in 1975 to mediate a century-old dispute between the Navajo and Hopi regarding a 1,800,000-acre (7,300 km^{2}) tract that lies inside the Navajo reservation, with the United States Congress mandating that the issue be settled through negotiation within six months.

In addition to serving as president of the National Academy of Arbitrators, Simkin was on the faculty of Harvard Business School from 1969 until 1973. He was the author of Mediation and the Dynamics of Collective Bargaining, published by the Bureau of National Affairs in 1971.

== Personal ==
Simkin died at age 85 on March 4, 1992, at his home in Haverford, Pennsylvania due to congestive heart failure. He was survived by his wife, two sons, six grandchildren and three great-grandchildren.
