= Rick Rescorla =

British-American soldier, September 11 rescuer and victim (1939–2001)

- Born: Cyril Richard Rescorla; May 27, 1939; Hayle, Cornwall, United Kingdom
- Died: September 11, 2001 (aged 62); South Tower, World Trade Center, New York City, United States
- Cause of death: Collapse of 2 World Trade Center during the September 11 attacks
- Alma mater: University of Oklahoma (BA., MA.) Oklahoma City University (JD)
- Military career
- Allegiance: United States; United Kingdom
- Branch: United States Army; British Army
- Service years: 1963–1990 (U.S.); 1956–1960 (United Kingdom)
- Rank: Colonel
- Units: 1st Cavalry Division (Airmobile); Parachute Regiment (UK)
- Known for: Evacuation efforts during the September 11 attacks
- Conflicts: Vietnam War; Cyprus Emergency
- Awards: Silver Star; Bronze Star (OLC); Purple Heart; Vietnam Gallantry Cross; General Service Medal (CYPRUS); Combat Infantryman Badge; Presidential Citizens Medal
- Other work: Police Officer Northern Rhodesia Police (1960–1963); Metropolitan Police Service (1963); World Trade Center Security Chief for Morgan Stanley

Cyril Richard Rescorla (May 27, 1939 – September 11, 2001) was a British-American soldier, police officer, educator and private security specialist. He served as a British Army paratrooper during the Cyprus Emergency and as a commissioned officer in the United States Army during the Vietnam War. He rose to the rank of colonel in the U.S. Army before entering the private sector, where he worked in corporate security.

As the director of security for the financial services firm Morgan Stanley at the World Trade Center, he died during the September 11 attacks after returning to the South Tower to help evacuate more people following his successful evacuation of the Morgan Stanley offices. Rescorla anticipated attacks on the towers after the 1993 World Trade Center bombing and implemented evacuation procedures which are credited with saving as many as 2,687 lives on 9/11.

== Early life ==
Cyril Richard Rescorla was born on May 27, 1939, in Hayle, Cornwall. He grew up there with his grandparents and his mother, who worked as a housekeeper and companion to the elderly. In 1943, during World War II, the town of Hayle served as headquarters for the 175th Infantry Regiment of the U.S. 29th Infantry Division, largely composed of soldiers from Maryland and Virginia preparing for the D-Day invasion of Normandy. As a boy, Rescorla idolized the American soldiers and wanted to become a soldier because of them.

Rescorla was a natural athlete, setting a school record in the shot put, and he was an avid boxer. When a professional boxing match was scheduled between a British boxer and a U.S. heavyweight contender named Tami Mauriello, his friends backed the Briton. Rescorla said "I'm for Tammy" [sic], and after Mauriello won the fight, everyone in Hayle knew him as "Tammy".

== Military and police career ==
=== British military ===
In 1956, at age 16, Rescorla left Hayle to join the army. At the time, Britain practiced conscription (known as National Service), which required every young man to serve for two years in the Armed Forces. Rescorla, however, chose to volunteer instead. This required him to serve three years, as the conditions for volunteers were considered better than those of conscripted soldiers. He enlisted in the British Army in 1957, training as a paratrooper with the Parachute Regiment and then serving with an intelligence unit in Cyprus during the EOKA Cypriot insurgency from 1957 to 1960.

Rescorla was awarded the General Service Medal with clasp Cyprus.

- General Service Medal with clasp Cyprus

=== Northern Rhodesia and Metropolitan Police Services ===
At the end of his Short-Service Commission, Rescorla joined the Northern Rhodesia Police (now the Zambia Police Service) as a police inspector on a three-year contract from 1960 to 1963, experiences that made him a fierce anti-Communist. It was during this period that he met and forged a "life-altering friendship" with American soldier Daniel J. Hill, who encouraged Rescorla to join the U.S. Army after he chose to accept discharge from the police rather than turn his guns on fellow white colonists resisting independence.

On returning to London, he joined the Metropolitan Police. He later moved to the United States after being unable to settle down in London, being interested in fighting instead.

=== U.S. military ===
Upon arrival in the United States, Rescorla lived at a YMCA hostel in Brooklyn until he was able to join the army. "Rick", as he would thereafter be known, enlisted in the United States Army in 1963 and, after basic training at Fort Dix, attended Officer Candidate School and airborne training at Fort Benning. Upon graduation, Rescorla was assigned as a platoon leader in the 2nd Battalion, 7th Cavalry Regiment, 1st Cavalry Division (Airmobile).

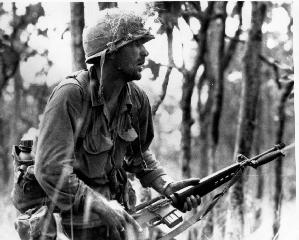
The image of Rescorla in Vietnam would be used on the cover of We Were Soldiers Once... And Young.

Rescorla was sent to Vietnam, where he served under the command of Lieutenant Colonel Hal Moore. The two participated in the 1965 Battle of Ia Drang, which Moore later described in a 1992 book he co‑authored, We Were Soldiers Once… And Young, (from which the 2002 Mel Gibson film We Were Soldiers would be adapted); Rescorla is the soldier pictured on the book jacket cover. Moore described Rescorla as "the best platoon leader I ever saw". Rescorla's men nicknamed him "Hard Core" for his bravery in battle and revered him for his good humor and compassion toward his men; Rescorla jokingly called his platoon "Hard Corps".

He is also mentioned in the book Baptism by Larry Gwin, who also fought at Ia Drang. The fourteenth chapter of the book, "Rescorla's Game", describes him as the "Cornish Hawk". Despite this tough image, according to his second wife and widow Susan Rescorla in her book, Touched by a Hero, music was "so central" to Rick's life that he sang to his troops in Vietnam to calm them – something he would later employ during 9/11 evacuations. In the 1965 Vietnam battle, Rescorla sang the Australian version of "Wild Colonial Boy" to give confidence to his troops.

Rescorla's Vietnam War honors included the Silver Star, the Bronze Star with Oak Leaf Cluster, a Purple Heart and the Vietnamese Cross of Gallantry.

- Silver Star
- Bronze Star with one Oak Leaf Cluster
- Purple Heart
- Vietnamese Cross of Gallantry

He left active duty in 1967 and reached the rank of colonel in the United States Army Reserve before retiring from the military in 1990. In April 2001, Rescorla was chosen for induction into the Infantry Officer Candidate School Hall of Fame and was invited to participate in ceremonies at Fort Benning.

== Post-military career ==
=== Education and teaching ===
After service in Vietnam, Rescorla returned to the U.S. and used his military benefits to study creative writing at the University of Oklahoma, eventually earning a Bachelor of Arts degree, followed by a Master of Arts degree in English, and his Juris Doctor degree from the Oklahoma City University School of Law. He then moved to South Carolina, where he taught criminal justice at the University of South Carolina for three years and published a textbook on the subject.

=== Corporate security ===
Rescorla left teaching for higher-paying jobs in corporate security. Moving to New Jersey in 1985, he joined Dean Witter Reynolds at its offices at the World Trade Center in Manhattan.

After the 1988 bombing of Pan Am Flight 103 over Lockerbie, Scotland, Rescorla worried about a terrorist attack on the World Trade Center. Because his old American friend from Northern Rhodesia, Daniel Hill, was trained in counterterrorism, in 1990 Rescorla asked him to visit the World Trade Center to assess its security. When Rescorla asked Hill how he would attack the building were he a terrorist, Hill asked to see the basement, and after the two walked down to the basement parking garage without being stopped by any visible security, Hill pointed to an easily accessible load-bearing column and said, "This is a soft touch. I'd drive a truck full of explosives in here, walk out, and light it off." That year, Rescorla and Hill wrote a report to the Port Authority of New York and New Jersey, which owns the site, insisting on the need for more security in the parking garage. Their recommendations, which would have been expensive to implement, were ignored, according to James B. Stewart's biography of Rescorla, Heart of a Soldier. In the 1993 World Trade Center bombing, terrorists detonated a truck bomb 30 feet from where Rescorla and Hill had predicted.

Following the 1993 bombing, Rescorla invited Hill to New York, where he hired him as a security consultant to analyze the building's security. Although no arrests had yet been made, Rescorla suspected that the bomb had been planted by Muslim terrorists or that an Iraqi colonel of engineers might have orchestrated the attack. Hill let his beard grow and visited several mosques in New Jersey, showing up for morning prayers at dawn. Speaking fluent Arabic, he took on the character of an anti-American Muslim to infiltrate and interview other visitors to the mosques. He concluded that the attack was likely planned by a radical imam at a mosque in New York or New Jersey. Subsequently, followers of Sheikh Omar Abdel Rahman, a Brooklyn-based radical Muslim cleric, were convicted of the bombing.

Rescorla gained credibility and authority after the bombing, which resulted in a change to the culture of Morgan Stanley. Rescorla wanted the company out of the building because he continued to feel, as did Hill, that the World Trade Center was still a target for terrorists and that the next attack could involve a plane crashing into one of the towers. He recommended to his superiors at Morgan Stanley that the company leave Manhattan office space, noting that labor costs were lower in New Jersey and that the firm's employees and equipment would be safer in a proposed four-story building. However, this recommendation was not followed because the company's lease at the World Trade Center would not terminate until 2006. At Rescorla's insistence, all employees (including senior executives) practiced emergency evacuations every three months.

After Dean Witter merged with Morgan Stanley in 1997, the company eventually occupied 22 floors in the South Tower and several floors in a building nearby. Rescorla's office was on the South Tower's 44th floor. Feeling that the authorities lost legitimacy after they failed to respond to his 1990 warnings, he concluded that employees of Morgan Stanley, the largest tenant in the World Trade Center, could not rely on first responders in an emergency and needed to empower themselves through surprise fire drills, in which he trained employees to meet in the hallway between stairwells and go down the stairs two by two to the 44th floor. Rescorla's strict approach to these drills put him into conflict with some high-powered executives, who resented the interruption to their daily activities, but he insisted that the rehearsals were necessary to train employees for an emergency. He timed employees with a stopwatch when they moved too slowly and lectured them on fire emergency basics.

In a 1998 interview conducted on the 44th floor of the World Trade Center that was later incorporated into the short film Voice of the Prophet, which premiered at the 2002 Sundance Film Festival, Rescorla recounted his experiences in battle and warned that American military actions abroad could spur retaliation by enemies of the United States. He said, "Terrorist forces can tie up conventional forces and bring them to their knees. Just one man willing to give his life for what he believes in, chooses the time and place and there is no way that any soldiers can be 100% alert."

Rescorla and Hill were also critical of the police response during the 1999 Columbine High School massacre, commenting, "The police were sitting outside while kids were getting killed. They should have put themselves between the perpetrators and the victims. That was abject cowardice." Rescorla felt that if he and Hill were younger, they "could have flown to Colorado, gone in that building, and ended that shit before the law did."

== Personal life ==
Rescorla and his first wife, Betsy Nathan, met as students at the University of Oklahoma. They married in Dallas in 1972. Their first child was born in South Carolina in 1976. Their second child was born in 1978 while they were living in Chicago. The family then moved to New Jersey. Rescorla and Nathan divorced after their children were grown.

In 1994, Rescorla was diagnosed with prostate cancer and underwent surgery to remove his prostate. Initially, the prognosis was positive, but by 1998 the cancer had spread to his bone marrow. He underwent treatment, which involved painful injections directly into his stomach every month and taking prescribed medications that dehydrated him and caused his body to swell. He also employed traditional Chinese medicine and meditation.

In late July 1998, Rescorla met his second wife, Susan Greer, while jogging near her Morristown, New Jersey, home. She was an assistant to a dean at Fairleigh Dickinson University and a twice-divorced mother of three daughters. Rescorla had been living in the area to be near his children after his divorce. Susan first spoke to him to ask him why he was jogging barefoot, a practice common in Northern Rhodesia, where few natives wore shoes and which he had adopted out of curiosity. Rescorla also mentioned to Greer that he was writing a play, Mkubwa Junction, which was set in Northern Rhodesia and based on his time there. The two moved into a Morristown townhouse together that October. They were married on February 20, 1999, in St. Augustine, Florida, where his longtime friend Daniel Hill had lived since 1975. Hill served as Rescorla's best man for the second time. Rescorla also chose St. Augustine because he wanted to be married somewhere near the sea, to remind him of his homeland of Cornwall. They later honeymooned in Hayle, Cornwall, in May 2000. During this time, Rescorla exhibited a positive outlook about his cancer.

Rescorla was fond of the food and the culture of the Portuguese community in Newark, New Jersey, and was learning to speak Portuguese in addition to Arabic. He also was fascinated with the American West and was interested in experiencing the spiritual aspects of Amerindian culture. He and Susan participated in yoga, ballroom dancing, and studying Italian together.

Having revered the eagle as a symbol of both American freedom and Native American mysticism, he told Susan that when he died he wanted her to contribute money to an endowment for eagles.

== September 11, 2001 ==
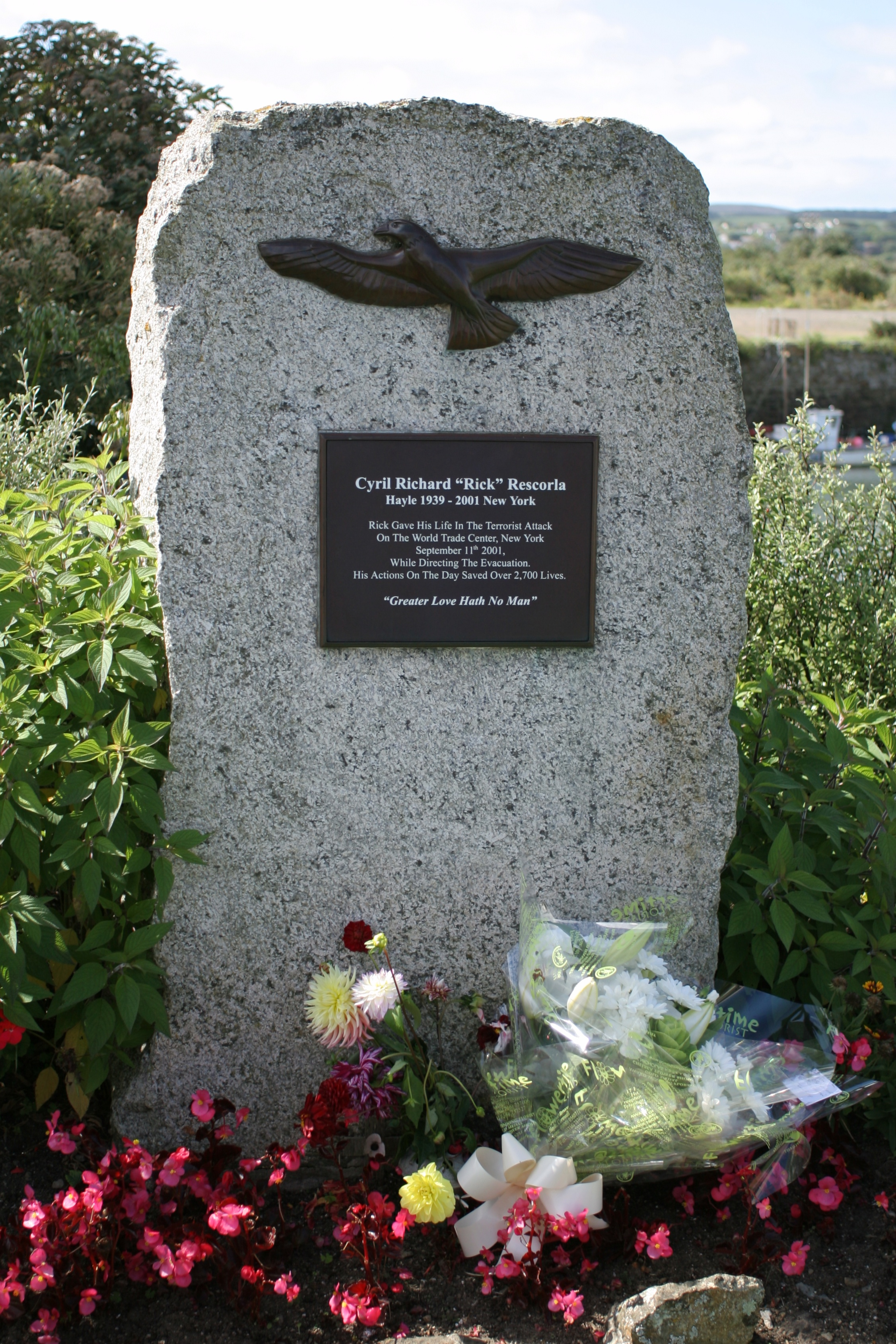
Cenotaph to Rick Rescorla in Hayle, Cornwall

At 8:46 a.m. on the morning of September 11, 2001, American Airlines Flight 11 struck the North Tower of the World Trade Center (WTC 1). Rescorla heard the explosion and saw the tower burning from his office window on the 44th floor of the South Tower (WTC 2). When a Port Authority announcement came over the P.A. system urging people to stay at their desks, and before United Airlines Flight 175 struck the South Tower at 9:03 a.m., Rescorla ignored the announcement, grabbed his bullhorn, walkie‑talkie, and cell phone, and began systematically ordering the roughly 2,700 Morgan Stanley employees in the South Tower to evacuate, in addition to the employees in WTC 5, numbering around 1,000. While watching the news coverage, in a phone call to his best friend, Dan Hill, Rescorla said, "The dumb sons of bitches told me not to evacuate," and, "They said it's just Building One. I told them I'm getting my people the fuck out of here." He directed people down a stairwell from a bottleneck on the 44th floor, keeping them away from elevators while telling them to remain calm.

Rescorla had boosted morale among his men in Vietnam by singing Cornish songs from his youth, and now he did the same in the stairwell, singing songs such as one based on the Welsh song "Men of Harlech":

Men of Cornwall stop your dreaming;
Can't you see their spearpoints gleaming?
See their warriors' pennants streaming
To this battlefield.
Men of Cornwall stand ye steady;
It cannot be ever said ye
for the battle were not ready;
Stand and never yield!

Between songs, Rescorla called his wife, telling her, "Stop crying. I have to get these people out safely. If something should happen to me, I want you to know I've never been happier. You made my life," and Susan replied, "You made my life, too" before the phone went dead. After successfully evacuating almost all of Morgan Stanley's 2,700 employees, he went back into the building. When one of his colleagues told him he too had to evacuate the World Trade Center, Rescorla replied, "As soon as I make sure everyone else is out." He was last seen on the 10th floor of the South Tower, heading upward, shortly before its collapse at 9:59 A.M., 56 minutes after being struck by United Airlines Flight 175. A total of 13 Morgan Stanley employees died in the September 11 attacks, including Rescorla, his deputies Wesley Mercer and Jorge Velazquez, and security guard Godwin Forde, who had stayed behind to help others. Rescorla was declared dead three weeks after the attacks. Although medical examiners continued to identify victims of the attacks from recovered remains as late as September 2021, as of that date none have been identified as those of Rescorla.

== Memorials and tributes ==
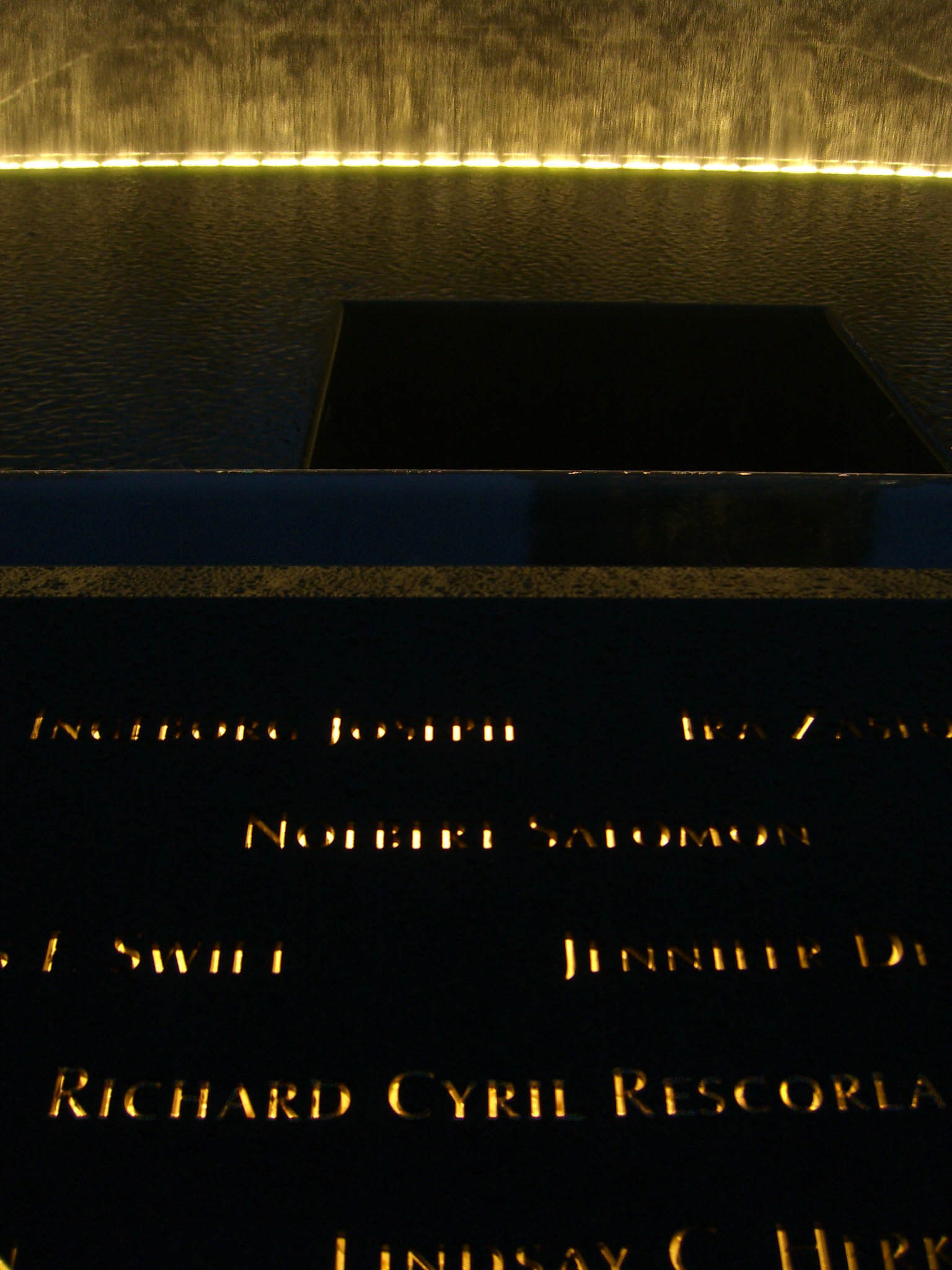
Rescorla's name is located on Panel S-46 of the National September 11 Memorial's South Pool.

Rescorla was uncomfortable about being portrayed as a war hero. Although he had given some interviews to his Vietnam commander, Harold Moore, for his 1992 book, We Were Soldiers Once… And Young, Rescorla chose not to read it when he saw that its cover featured a combat photograph of him. When he learned that the book was being made into a film starring Mel Gibson, he told his wife Susan that he had no intention of seeing it, as he felt uncomfortable with anything that portrayed him or other survivors as war heroes, commenting, "The real heroes are dead."

Nevertheless, Rescorla's activities during the September 11 attacks were quickly brought to national attention by the news media, including a detailed account by Michael Grunwald in the October 28, 2001, edition of The Washington Post of Rescorla's life and "epic death, one of those inspirational hero-tales that have sprouted like wildflowers from the Twin Towers rubble." Other memorials and tributes to Rescorla include:

- At a small, brief memorial service attended by family and a few close friends on October 27, Susan recited "The White Rose", a Cornish folk song that Rescorla was fond of, and a hawk that had recently been restored to health was released into freedom.
- The Morristown police paid tribute to Rescorla at a fundraising dinner. Susan donated Rescorla's dark green Lincoln Mark VIII, which had been left in the station parking lot, to be auctioned for charity as a "hero's car."
- The town of Hayle, Cornwall, held a memorial service attended by the head of Morgan Stanley in London.
- Several days after the Hayle service, a tribute for the attacks' British victims was held at Westminster Abbey and attended by Queen Elizabeth II.
- Rescorla was honored with the White Cross of Cornwall/An Grows Wyn a Gernow award from his native Cornwall in 2003 by the Revived Cornish Stannary Parliament.
- The opera Rescorla Variations by Cornish composer William Lewarne Harris received its premiere in 2006.
- In 2009, a statue of Rescorla was unveiled on The Walk Of Honor at the National Infantry Museum at Fort Benning, Georgia.
- On November 11, 2009, Rescorla was inducted into the Oklahoma Military Hall of Fame.
- In 2015, Rescorla was memorialized at the 2nd Battalion, 7th Cavalry Regiment's conference room, now called the "Rick Rescorla Conference Room".
- At the National September 11 Memorial & Museum, Rescorla is memorialized at the South Pool, on Panel S-46.
- The Rick Rescorla National Award for Resilience was created by the Department of Homeland Security to "recognize outstanding response to a catastrophic incident and leadership in fostering resilient and prepared communities."
- On April 13, 2019, at the Long Rock train depot in Rescorla's native Cornwall, a new Class 802 train was named "Rick Rescorla" in a ceremony that also named another train the "Solomon Browne", after the lifeboat and crew lost in the Penlee lifeboat disaster.
- On September 11, 2019, President Donald Trump announced that Rescorla would be honored with the Presidential Citizens Medal, which was presented to Susan at a White House ceremony on November 7.
- In 2021, legislation introduced by state senator Anthony M. Bucco to designate May 27 as "Richard Rescorla Day" in New Jersey unanimously passed in the New Jersey Senate.
- Rescorla is honored by plaques at the Mount Soledad National Veterans Memorial in San Diego, California, and at the Raptor Trust near his home in Long Hill Township, New Jersey. The latter memorial is the only one he specifically requested before his death.

== Post-9/11 media coverage ==
External videos
- Presentation by James B. Stewart on Heart of a Soldier, February 22, 2003, C-SPAN

- Rescorla was the subject of a 2002 biography, Heart of a Soldier by James B. Stewart.
- Rescorla was the subject of a 2005 documentary titled The Man Who Predicted 9/11. The film was shown on Channel 4 in the UK and the History Channel in the United States.
- Amanda Ripley's 2008 book, The Unthinkable: Who Survives When Disaster Strikes—and Why, profiles Rescorla.
- Stewart's book became the basis of an opera of the same name by Christopher Theofanidis. It was premiered by the San Francisco Opera on September 10, 2011, in a production starring Thomas Hampson as Rescorla.
- Rescorla was covered in National Geographic's documentary 9/11: One Day in America, Episode 2 "The South Tower." Survivors provide first hand account of Rick singing and telling people "It's a proud day to be an American."

== See also ==
- John P. O'Neill, former FBI agent and WTC head of security who died in the attacks on 9/11
