= John Finnegan =

John Finnegan may refer to:

- John Finnegan (explorer), Australian explorer and convict, marooned with Thomas Pamphlett
- John Finnegan (footballer), Scottish footballer
- John Finnegan (The Bold and the Beautiful), a fictional character from the original CBS Daytime soap opera, The Bold and the Beautiful, played by actor Tanner Novlan.
- John P. Finnegan, American actor
- John Finnegan (footballer), Scottish footballer
- John D. Finnegan, businessman
- John J. Finnegan, American politician
- John Lawrence Finnegan, actor
- John Finnegan, character in Deep Rising

== See also ==
- John Finegan (disambiguation)
