= The Hackney Scout Song Book =

English publication first printed 1921

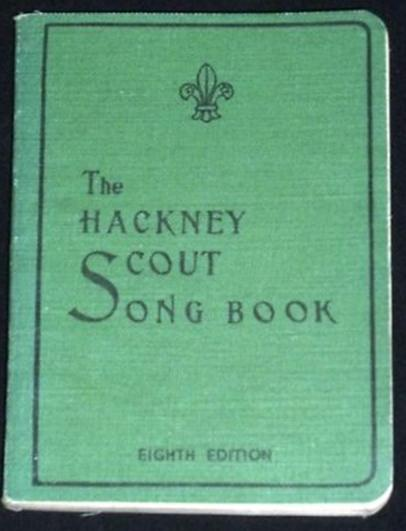
The Hackney Scout Song Book

The Hackney Scout Song Book contains a collection of songs which were popular in the early days of the Scout Movement in the United Kingdom. Although originally intended for the use of Scouts in the Hackney district of East London, it quickly became the standard work of its type in the UK and around the world. First printed in December 1921, the last edition was published in 1972.

The book has its origin in a series of indoor "campfire" gatherings for Hackney Scouts organised by Stanly Ince, a local Scout Commissioner, who had been paralyzed by polio following his service in World War I. Guests to these meetings included Robert Baden-Powell, the founder of Scouting. Lacking "a common fund of song", Ince founded a "Song Book Committee" and in December 1921, the first edition of the new song book was printed. It was a soft-covered pocket-sized book in the traditional Songster format and included a mix of folk and popular songs, together with some hymns and items composed specifically for Scouts. The "National Anthem of the Ancient Britons" and "Michael Finnagen" appeared in print for the first time in its pages. The book was "dedicated to the undying memory of those Hackney Scouts who died in the service of their country 1914 – 1918".

Originally intended only for Hackney Scouts, the first edition sold out within a few months. It remained in print for more than 50 years, sold over 130,000 copies and was translated into 27 languages.
