= David L. Cole =

American lawyer

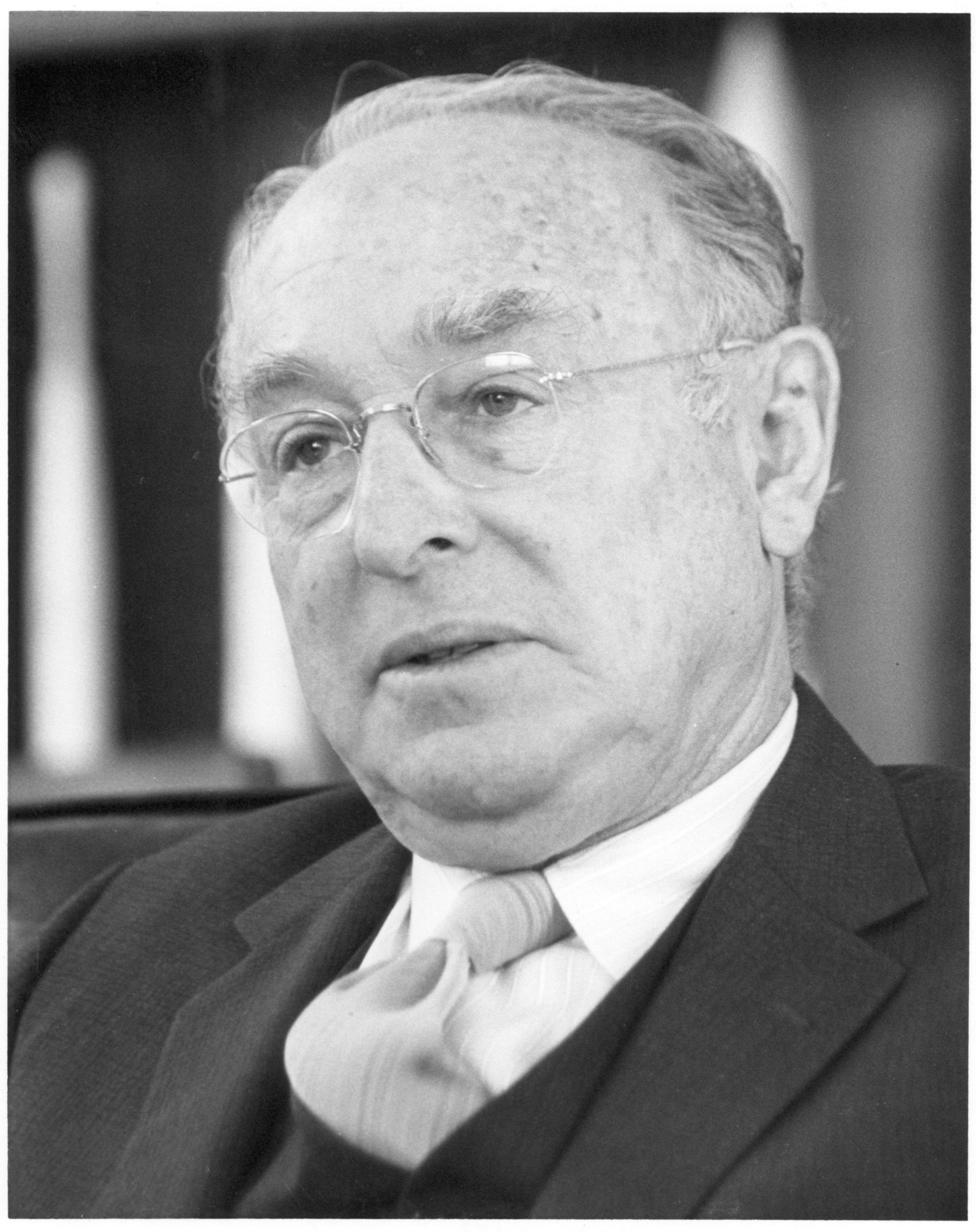
- David L. Cole, 1952
- Born: 1902; Paterson, New Jersey
- Died: January 25, 1978 (aged 76); Paterson, New Jersey
- Occupations: Lawyer, federal civil servant, noted arbitrator
- Known for: He was the second director of the Federal Mediation and Conciliation Service (FMCS)

David Lawrence Cole (1902 – February 25, 1978) was an American labor mediator who served as the second Director of the Federal Mediation and Conciliation Service, appointed by President of the United States Harry S. Truman in 1952 to succeed Cyrus S. Ching.

Cole was one of the early pioneers in arbitrating labor disputes, working as the "third man" in negotiations involving the New York City Subway system, the steel industry and between different unions. Arbitrator Theodore W. Kheel called Cole "the world's greatest arbitrator". Cole described his role as helping parties deal with problems on their own and "to rely less and less on a third party". In addition to serving locally in labor negotiations and committees in the New York Tri-State Region and Pennsylvania, Cole served in the labor mediation field under every US President from Franklin D. Roosevelt to Richard Nixon.

== Early life and education ==
Cole was born in 1902 in Paterson, New Jersey, where his father was a silk manufacturer. He graduated from Harvard University in 1921, and went on to earn a law degree at Harvard Law School in 1924. He returned to Paterson to work as an attorney for companies in the industry, starting in 1926. Cole's son described how the fact that companies there had their looms "trucked out of town as an answer to the union" led his father to "gravitate to the middle of the table".

== Labor negotiation ==
Cole first became involved in national labor issues when it was suggested that he become involved in a dispute regarding the steel industry that threatened to overturn wage controls established during World War II. Philip Murray, president of the United Steelworkers and later head of the Congress of Industrial Organizations, rejected Cole for the role. After Cole challenged him about the rejection and Murray explained that the concern was that he was too close to management, Cole had Murray confirm his credentials with New Jersey union leaders, and got the post after the original objections were withdrawn.

Cole was known for tracking negotiations using four pens with different colors of ink, using a different color to track each side's stance and his own notes. The detailed and colorful tracking of the negotiations helped Cole convince both labor and management that he was ensuring that both sides were heard.

One of Cole's most-treasured objects was a signed poster from Marc Chagall, given to him by the artist after Cole helped break a stalemate in negotiations to ensure that the new Metropolitan Opera facility in Manhattan's Lincoln Center for the Performing Arts opened successfully in 1966.

He served as president of the National Academy of Arbitrators and as a trustee of both the American Arbitration Association and the Carnegie Endowment for International Peace.

== Personal ==
Cole died at age 75 on January 25, 1978, at his home in Paterson. He was survived by his wife, Helen, as well as a daughter, two sons, and five grandchildren.
