= Men of Harlech =

Welsh song and military march

"Men of Harlech" or "The March of the Men of Harlech" (Welsh: Rhyfelgyrch Gwŷr Harlech) is a song and military march which is traditionally said to describe events during the seven-year siege of Harlech Castle between 1461 and 1468, when the castle was held by the Lancastrians against the Yorkists as part of the Wars of the Roses. Commanded by Constable Dafydd ap Ieuan, son of the Baron of Hendwr, the garrison withstood the longest known siege in the history of the British Isles. ("Through Seven Years" is an alternative name for the song.) The song has also been associated with the earlier, briefer siege of Harlech Castle about 1407-09, which pitted the forces of Owain Glyndŵr against the future Henry V of England.

"Men of Harlech" is important for Welsh national culture. The song gained international recognition when it was featured in the 1941 movie How Green Was My Valley and the 1964 film Zulu.

== History ==
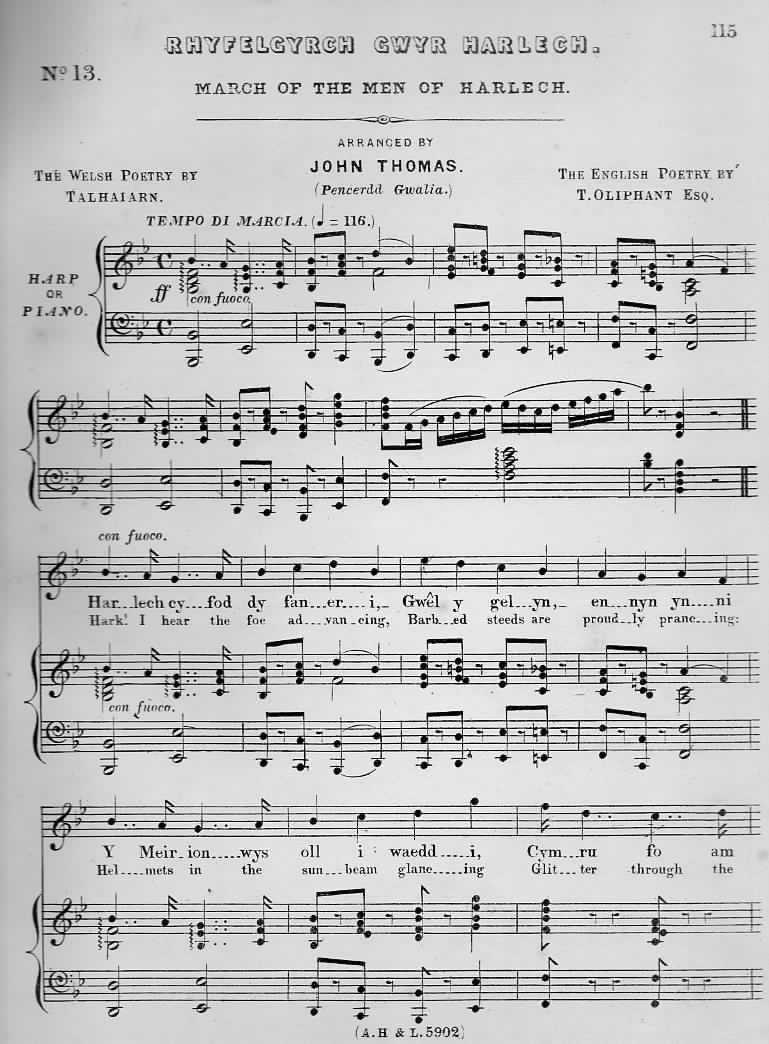
Thomas Oliphant's words as they appear in "Welsh Melodies With Welsh and English Poetry" (volume 2), published during 1862. The lyrics are the same as the c. 1830 broadside.

The music was first published without words during 1794 as "Gorhoffedd Gwŷr Harlech—March of the Men of Harlech" in the second edition of The Musical and Poetical Relicks of the Welsh Bards, but it is said to be a much earlier folk song. The earliest version of the tune to appear with lyrics, found thus far, comes from a broadside printed c. 1830. Since then, many different versions of the English lyrics have been published. It was published first with Welsh lyrics in Y Canigydd, edited by the Welsh poet, John Owen (Owain Alaw), published in Wrexham, Wales, during 1860. A second edition titled in English Gems of Welsh Melody, containing Welsh and English lyrics was published in Ruthin, Wales, during 1862. The song was published in Volume II of the 1862 collection Welsh Melodies with the Welsh lyrics by the Welsh poet John Jones (Talhaiarn) and the English lyrics by Thomas Oliphant, President of the Madrigal Society, which does clearly identify the song with the siege of Glyndŵr. Another source attributes the Welsh words to the poet John Ceiriog Hughes, saying that they were first published during 1890, and that English words were first published during 1893, but this is clearly predated by the earlier publications; and in the case of Ceiriog's Welsh-language lyrics for the tune, they are to be found many years earlier, in Brinley Richards (ed.), The Songs of Wales (1873).

== Use and versions of the song ==
"Men of Harlech" is widely used as a regimental march, especially by British Army and Commonwealth regiments historically associated with Wales. Notably, it is the slow march of the Welsh Guards, the quick march of the Royal Welsh, Royal Canadian Mounted Police and the march of the Royal Canadian Hussars (Montreal), The Governor General's Horse Guards, and The Ontario Regiment, for which it is the slow march. Men of Harlech is also commonly used as a march-past song within the Royal Canadian Air Cadets program.

It was first used for cinema during the titles of How Green Was My Valley (1941) and has featured in a number of other films. It is best known for its prominent role in the 1964 film Zulu, although the version of lyrics sung in it was written specially for the film. It is sung twice (once completely) in the film (the British open fire on the charging Zulus before the start of the final couplet), in counterpoint to the Zulu war chants and the pounding of their shields. Film editor John Jympson cut the scene to the song so that on either side of cuts where the British soldiers cannot be heard, the song is in the correct relative position. The song is also heard in the film Zulu Dawn, which is about the Battle of Isandlwana. It is also used twice in the film The Englishman Who Went up a Hill but Came down a Mountain (1995), first played by the village brass band celebrating the measurement of the mountain and secondly sung in welsh at the very end of the film, when the hill is raised again.

Rick Rescorla, Chief of Security for Morgan Stanley's World Trade Center office, sang a Cornish adaptation of "Men of Harlech" with a bullhorn, along with other anthems, to keep employee spirits high while they evacuated during the September 11 attacks. After helping save more than 2,700 employees he returned to the towers to evacuate others until the towers collapsed on him.

"Men of Harlech" was used as part of the startup music for ITV television station Teledu Cymru during the early 1960s and, until April 2006, in Fritz Spiegl's "BBC Radio 4 UK Theme".

From 1996 to 1999, HTV Wales used part of the song for Wales Tonight.

Adapted versions are sung by fans of several Welsh football clubs and as school or college songs around the world. There is a humorous parody known variously as "National Anthem of the Ancient Britons" and "Woad", written some time before 1914 by William Hope-Jones.

Bryn Terfel recorded "Men of Harlech" for his 2000 album We'll Keep a Welcome.

Classical arrangements include Franz Joseph Haydn's Hob. XXXIb:2 and the final movement of Edward German's Welsh Rhapsody (1904). William Thomas Best wrote a fantasia for organ based on the tune.

== Lyrics ==
There are many versions of "Men of Harlech", and there is no single accepted English version. The version below was published in 1873.

=== John Oxenford version (published 1873) ===
Verse 1
Men of Harlech, march to glory,
Victory is hov'ring o'er ye,
Bright-eyed freedom stands before ye,
Hear ye not her call?
At your sloth she seems to wonder;
Rend the sluggish bonds asunder,
Let the war-cry's deaf'ning thunder
Every foe appall.

Echoes loudly waking,
Hill and valley shaking;
'Till the sound spreads wide around,
The Saxon's courage breaking;
Your foes on every side assailing,
Forward press with heart unfailing,
'Till invaders learn with quailing,
Cambria ne'er can yield!

Verse 2
Thou, who noble Cambria wrongest,
Know that freedom's cause is strongest,
Freedom's courage lasts the longest,
Ending but with death!
Freedom countless hosts can scatter,
Freedom stoutest mail can shatter,
Freedom thickest walls can batter,
Fate is in her breath.

See, they now are flying!
Dead are heap'd with dying!
Over might hath triumph'd right,
Our land to foes denying;
Upon their soil we never sought them,
Love of conquest hither brought them,
But this lesson we have taught them,
"Cambria ne'er can yield!"

An earlier version is thus:-

=== Broadside version c. 1830, republished by Thomas Oliphant in 1862 ===
Verse 1
Hark! I hear the foe advancing,
Barbed steeds are proudly prancing,
Helmets in the sunbeams glancing
Glitter through the trees.
Men of Harlech, lie ye dreaming?
See ye not their falchions gleaming,
While their pennons gaily streaming
Flutter in the breeze?

From the rocks rebounding,
Let the war cry sounding
Summon all at Cambria's call,
The haughty foe surrounding,
Men of Harlech, on to glory!
See, your banner famed in story
Waves these burning words before ye
"Britain scorns to yield!"

Verse 2
'Mid the fray, see dead and dying,
Friend and foe together lying;
All around, the arrows flying,
Scatter sudden death!
Frighten'd steeds are wildly neighing,
Brazen trumpets hoarsely braying,
Wounded men for mercy praying
With their parting breath!

See! they're in disorder!
Comrades, keep close order!
Ever they shall rue the day
They ventured o'er the border!
Now the Saxon flies before us!
Vict'ry's banner floateth o'er us!
Raise the loud exulting chorus
"Britain wins the field."

=== John Baker lyrics as published in Gems of Welsh Melody, 1862 ===
March ye men of Harlech bold, Unfurl your banners in the field,
Be brave as were your sires of old, And like them never yield!
What tho' evry hill and dale, Echoes now with war's alarms,
Celtic hearts can never quail, When Cambria calls to arms.

By each lofty mountain, By each crystal fountain,
By your homes where those you love Await your glad returning,
Let each thought and action prove, True glory can the Cymru move,
And as each blade gleams in the light, Pray "God defend the right!"

Clans from Mona wending, Now with Arvon blending,
Haste with rapid strides along The path that leads to glory,
From Snowdon's hills with harp and song, And Nantlle's vale proceeds a throng,
Whose ranks with yours shall proudly vie, "And nobly win or die!"

March ye men of Harlech go, Lov'd fatherland your duty claims,
Onward comes the Saxon foe, His footsteps mark'd in flames;
But his march breeds no dismay, Boasting taunts we meet with scorn,
Craven like their hosts shall flee Like mists before the morn.

On the foemen dashing, Swords and bucklers clashing;
Smite with will their savage band Nor think of e'er retreating:
But with a firm unflinching hand, In blood quench ev'ry burning brand,
And for each roof tree cast away A Saxon life shall pay.

Thus each bosom nerving, From no danger swerving,
Soon shall the invader feel The doom of fate rewarding;
They firmly grasp the flashing steel, And as ye strike for Cymru's weal,
Be this your cry, till life's last breath - "Our Liberty or Death!"

=== Z version by John Barry Prendergast (1964) ===
Men of Harlech, stop your dreaming,
Can't you see their spearpoints gleaming?
See their warrior pennants streaming,
To this battle field!

Men of Harlech stand ye steady,
It can not be ever said ye
For the battle were not ready,
Welshmen never yield!

From the hills rebounding,
Let this war cry sounding,
Summon all at Cambria's call,
The mighty force surrounding!

Men of Harlech on to glory,
This will ever be your story,
Keep these burning words before ye,
Welshmen will not yield!

(2x)

=== Regimental Band lyrics by John Guard ===
Verse 1
Tongues of fire on Idris flaring,
News of foemen near declaring,
To heroic deeds of daring,
Call you, Harlech men.

Groans of wounded peasants dying,
Wails of wives and children flying,
For the distant succour crying,
Call you, Harlech Men.

Shall the voice of wailing,
Now be unavailing,
You to rouse, who never yet
In battle's hour were failing?

This our answer, crowds down pouring,
Swift as winter torrents roaring.
Not in vain the voice imploring
Calls on Harlech men.

Verse 2
Loud the martial pipes are sounding,
Every manly heart is bounding,
As our trusted chief surrounding,
March we, Harlech men.

Short the sleep the foe is taking;
Ere the morrow's morn is breaking,
They shall have a rude awakening,
Roused by Harlech Men.

Mothers, cease your weeping,
Calm may be your sleeping,
You and yours in safety now,
The Harlech men are keeping.

Ere the sun is high in heaven,
They you fear, by panic riven,
Shall, like frightened sheep, be driven,
Far, by Harlech men.

=== Welsh lyrics (by J. Ceiriog Hughes) ===
Wele goelcerth wen yn fflamio
A thafodau tân yn bloeddio
Ar i'r dewrion ddod i daro
Unwaith eto'n un
Gan fanllefau tywysogion
Llais gelynion, trwst arfogion
A charlamiad y marchogion
Craig ar graig a gryn.

Arfon byth ni orfydd
Cenir yn dragywydd
Cymru fydd fel Cymru fu
Yn glodus ym mysg gwledydd.
Yng ngwyn oleuni'r goelcerth acw
Tros wefusau Cymro'n marw
Annibyniaeth sydd yn galw
Am ei dewraf ddyn.

Ni chaiff gelyn ladd ac ymlid
Harlech! Harlech! cwyd i'w herlid
Y mae Rhoddwr mawr ein Rhyddid
Yn rhoi nerth i ni.
Wele Gymru a'i byddinoedd
Yn ymdywallt o'r mynyddoedd!
Rhuthrant fel rhaeadrau dyfroedd
Llamant fel y lli!

Llwyddiant i'n marchogion
Rwystro gledd yr estron!
Gwybod yn ei galon gaiff
Fel bratha cleddyf Brython
Y cledd yn erbyn cledd a chwery
Dur yn erbyn dur a dery
Wele faner Gwalia'i fyny
Rhyddid aiff â hi!

== See also ==
- Rick Rescorla § September 11, 2001

== General sources ==
- "Men of Harlech" at the Volkslieder, German & Other Folk Songs Homepage
