= George H. Cohen =

American government official

George H. Cohen is an American lawyer. He is a former director of the Federal Mediation and Conciliation Service in the United States. He was appointed in 2009 by President Barack Obama.

== Early life and family ==
Cohen was born in Brooklyn, New York and was raised on Long Island in Long Beach He attended Cornell University, where he was a sports reporter for the college newspaper. He earned a law degree at Cornell Law School in 1957. Afterwards, he joined the United States Army.

Cohen's son, Bruce, is an Academy Award-winning film producer.

== 2013 credit card scandal ==
In 2013, The Washington Examiner reported that Cohen used federal funds to purchase artwork painted by his wife to adorn his office as well as used for items such as champagne, $200 coasters, and a $1,300 chair. Cohen retaliated against two whistleblowers who brought spending concerns to government regulators, firing one after a hospital stay and paying another hundreds of thousands of dollars to settle a retaliation complaint. He personally forced a third whistleblower to write an email retracting her allegations to the General Services Administration.

In response, the FMCS issued the following statement, as printed in the Examiner: "These items which the Examiner is inquiring about appear to have been the subject of a now-settled employment dispute involving a disgruntled FMCS employee. These purchasing issues were addressed in the settlement, but must remain confidential under federal personnel rules, as noted, in the absence of a release from the employee.

When FMCS became aware of this employee’s concerns about the Agency’s procurement practices, we took immediate actions. These actions included taking steps to ensure that the Agency’s internal processes meet federal regulations. Additionally, we obtained a review by an outside, independent authority regarding FMCS procurements made over a period of years. We conducted a prompt and thorough investigation and a review of our own internal processes. With the settlement of the employment dispute, the conclusion of our own investigation and reviews by outside authorities, the allegations were dropped and outside authorities indicated they would take no further action."

Amid allegations of wasteful and possibly fraudulent expenses during his tenure at FMCS, Cohen announced his retirement from the agency, effective December 31, 2013.
