= Joseph F. Finnegan =

American lawyer

Joseph Francis Finnegan (September 12, 1904 – February 12, 1964) was an American labor mediator who was appointed by President of the United States Dwight D. Eisenhower to serve as the fourth Director of the Federal Mediation and Conciliation Service from 1955 to 1961, and served as the first director of the equivalent body in New York State.

== Early life and education ==
He was born on September 12, 1904, in North Adams, Massachusetts. His newspaperman father moved the family to New York City when Finnegan was a youth. He attended St. Francis Xavier High School there and graduated from Columbia University in 1928. He was an evening student at Fordham University School of Law, graduating in 1931 his law degree.

Finnegan funded his law school education with a job checking cargo on the piers in Brooklyn and as a Wall Street Journal reporter. After graduating from law school, He worked as an assistant United States Attorney under Thomas E. Dewey from 1931 to 1934 and then spent a year in a law firm. Passage of the Wagner Act in 1935 led to a surge in demand for labor law specialists and he pursued the trend and "became an expert awfully fast".

During World War II, Finnegan served in the Air Transport Command of the United States Army Air Forces, attaining the rank of major. He was assigned responsibility for traveling across the globe to convince incapable top-ranking officers to retire, recalling how he "went into a general's office and gave him 10 reasons why he should go home".

== Federal and state mediation roles ==
President Eisenhower nominated him in January 1955 to serve as the fourth Director of the Federal Mediation and Conciliation Service, at the urging of James P. Mitchell, a professional acquaintance who was Eisenhower's choice as United States Secretary of Labor. He was unanimously confirmed by the United States Senate later that month. It was a position he served in until 1961. He took office on February 7, 1955, with a commitment that he would not dictate terms to either labor or management, as these are matters at "the very heart and essence of collective bargaining under our free enterprise system" and that the alternative would "invite a totalitarian approach".

As Director, Finnegan and the FMCS played roles in mediating settlements in a lengthy 1955 strike against Westinghouse Electric, a newspaper deliverers strike in 1958, the Steel strike of 1959 (as well as another industry action in 1956) and a strike against Anaconda Copper in 1960.

Finnegan discussed the issues of workforce changes resulting from increased use of automation, stating in 1960 that employers should not be saddled with "antiquated rules and methods", but that the workers made redundant through new technologies should not be handled as "a robot to be cast on a trash heap".

Months after leaving his federal government post, he was named as the first director of the New York State Mediation Board. Nominated by Governor of New York Nelson Rockefeller on May 4, 1961, Finnegan was sworn in on by Secretary of State of New York Caroline Simon.on June 1 of that year. He remained in the position until stepping down in November 1963 due to illness, three months before his death.

== Personal ==
A resident of Arlington County, Virginia, Finnegan died at age 59 on February 12, 1964, due to lung disease. He was survived by his wife, the former Maurine Clarkson Schooler.
