= James Finnegan =

James Finnegan may refer to:

- James Finnegan (American football) (1901–1967), American football player
- James Finnegan (poet), Irish writer
- James A. Finnegan (1906–1958), American politician from Philadelphia, Pennsylvania
- James E. Finnegan (1892–1966), American politician in Wisconsin
