= Dana Finnegan =

American addiction counsellor (1932–2022)

- Born: May 8, 1932; New Jersey, U.S.
- Died: November 2022 (aged 90); Florida, U.S.
- Occupations: Addiction specialist, alcoholism counselor
- Spouse: Emily Bush McNally

Dana Gillespie Finnegan (May 8, 1932 – November 2022) was an American therapist, alcoholism counselor and addiction specialist. In 1979, she was a founding member of the National Association of Lesbian and Gay Addiction Professionals (NALGAP), now known as NALGAP: The Association of Lesbian, Gay, Bisexual, Transgender Addiction Professionals and Their Allies. She and her partner, Emily B. McNally, wrote an important text in their field.

== Early life and education ==
Finnegan was raised in Mountain Lakes, New Jersey, the daughter of George Bernard Finnegan Jr. and Elisabeth Bartlett Morgan Finnegan. Her father was a patent lawyer and a West Point graduate, as was her older brother Marcus. She earned a master's degree in English from Stanford University, with a thesis titled "Christopher Marlowe: Dramatist of Transition" (1956). She completed a Ph.D. in English literature at the University of Missouri, with a dissertation titled "The development of Marlowe's dramatic skills" (1969).

== Career ==
Finnegan taught English at the University of Missouri and at Mary Washington College as a young woman. A recovering alcoholic herself, she became an alcoholism counselor in the early 1970s, and co-director of Discovery Counseling Center in Millburn, New Jersey. She attended and later taught at the Rutgers Summer School of Alcohol Studies. In 1979, she was a founding member of the National Association of Lesbian and Gay Addiction Professionals (NALGAP). Her book with Emily B. McNally, Dual Identities: Counseling Chemically Dependent Gay Men and Lesbians (1987, 2000) is considered an important text in their field. It was revised again, with new editor Michael Shelton, as Fundamentals of LGBT Substance Use Disorders: Multiple Identities, Multiple Challenges (2016).

== Publications ==
- "Working Together: The National Association of Gay Alcoholism Professionals" (1982, with Emily B. McNally)
- Dual Identities: Counseling Chemically Dependent Gay Men and Lesbians (1987, with Emily B. McNally)
- "Lesbian Recovering Alcoholics: A Qualitative Study of Identity Transformation— A Report on Research and Applications to Treatment" (1993, with Emily B. McNally)
- "The Lonely Journey: Lesbians and Gay Men Who Are Co-dependent" (1989, with Emily B. McNally)
- "The National Association of Lesbian and Gay Alcoholism Professionals (NALGAP): A Retrospective" (1995, with Emily B. McNally)
- "Defining God or a Higher Power: The Spiritual Center of Recovery" (1995, with Emily B. McNally)
- "Chemically Dependent Lesbians and Bisexual Women: Recovery from Many Traumas" (1996, with Emily B. McNally)
- "Chemical Dependency and Depression in Lesbians and Gay Men: What Helps?" (1996, with Emily B. McNally)
- Chemical dependency: Women at risk (1996, edited with Brenda L. Underhill)
- "Making Up for Lost Time: Chemically Dependent Lesbians in Later Midlife" (2000, with Emily B. McNally)
- Ollie, Ollie, In Free: A Memoir (2018)

== Personal life ==
Finnegan met her longtime personal and professional partner, Emily Bush McNally, in 1974. They were legally married in New York City in November 2012. They lived together in Greenwich Village after 1980, and retired to Fort Myers, Florida. Finnegan died in 2022, at the age of 90.
