= George Finegan =

Australian rules footballer

Personal information
- Full name: George Finegan
- Born: 31 March 1935
- Died: 19 December 2016 (aged 81)
- Original team: Sale

Playing career^{1}
Years	Club	Games (Goals)
1958	Geelong	4 (0)
- ^{1} Playing statistics correct to the end of 1958.

George Finegan (31 March 1935 – 19 December 2016) was an Australian rules footballer who played for Geelong in the Victorian Football League (now known as the Australian Football League).
