= Jean Finnegan =

Australian botanist

- Education: University of Adelaide
- Occupation: Botanist
- Notable work: Transcriptional studies of bacteriophage 18

Elizabeth Jean Finnegan FAA is an Australian botanist who researches plant flowering processes and epigenetic regulation in plants. She currently works at the Commonwealth Scientific and Industrial Research Organisation (CSIRO) as a senior scientist, leading research on the "Control of Floral Initiation", part of the CSIRO Agriculture Flagship (formerly known as CSIRO Plant Industry).

== Education ==
Finnegan received her Bachelor of Science (honours) from the University of Adelaide, and her PhD from the University of Adelaide in 1979. Her thesis was Transcriptional studies of bacteriophage 186.

== Recognition ==
Finnegan was elected a Fellow of the Australian Academy of Science in May 2014 on the basis of her world leading research on plant gene expression. Her contribution to plant science includes her early work, cloning the first plant (METI), and her work demonstrating that DNA methylation (a biochemical process that modifies the plant's DNA) is essential for normal plant development and by reducing levels of methylation changes the plant's size and shape, flowering time, structure of the flowers and number of seeds.

In 2012, Finnegan was awarded the Julian Wells Medal for contributions to research on the organisation and expression of the genome.

Finnegan is on the editorial board for BMC Plant Biology.

== Research ==
Finnegan's research focuses on epigenetic mechanisms of flowering processes in plants, specifically, the role of DNA methylation in normal plant development. DNA methylation is a biochemical process that modifies DNA, with Finnegan's work some of the first to show this in plants. She generated plants with reduced levels of DNA methylation using an antisense against METI, and determined the molecular basis for the abnormal phenotypes displayed by plants with reduced levels of methylation. She continues to be a leader in her field through her research on flowering processes and the role of DNA methylation and epigenetics helping to understand the mechanisms contributing to the down-regulation of flowering locus C (FLC) in vernalized plants. The focus of her current research is investigating the role of DNA methylation in regulating traits of agronomic importance in wheat.
