= Federal Mediation and Conciliation Service (United States) =

Independent agency of the US government

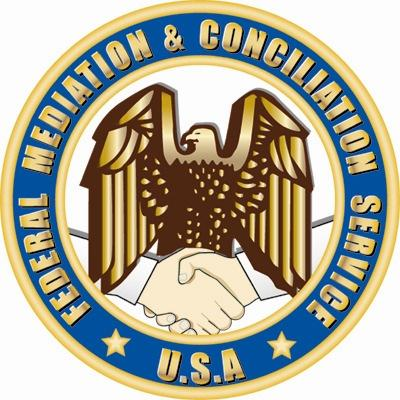

Agency overview
- Formed: June 23, 1947
- Preceding agency: United States Conciliation Service
- Jurisdiction: Federal government of the United States
- Headquarters: Washington, D.C.
- Employees: Approx 93 including around 58 mediators (June 2026)
- Agency executive: Anna Davis, Acting Agency Head; Julie Berko, Chief Operating Officer; Jennifer Disotell, Associate Deputy Director of Field Operations
- Website: www.fmcs.gov

The Federal Mediation and Conciliation Service (FMCS) is an independent agency of the United States government that provides conflict resolution services to private and public workers and employers, including mediation services for parties who cannot resolve a collective bargaining dispute. The agency aims to support the economy and workplace environments by resolving disputes that threaten the free flow of commerce. It is not a regulatory agency.

Founded in 1947, it is the nation's largest public agency for dispute resolution and conflict management, providing mediation and related conflict prevention and resolution services in the private and public sectors. FMCS provides training and relationship development programs for management and unions to promote labor-management cooperation. The agency also provides mediation, conflict prevention, and conflict management services outside the labor context for federal agencies. The FMCS headquarters is in Washington, D.C., with nine field offices across the country.

On March 14, 2025, President Donald Trump signed an executive order that called for the elimination of non-statutory components and functions of several government agencies, including FMCS, "to the maximum extent consistent with applicable law".

== Purpose and programs ==
FMCS was created by Congress as a neutral and independent government agency upon enactment of the Labor-Management Relations Act of 1947 (Taft–Hartley Act). Congress mandated FMCS to resolve industrial conflict and promote labor-management peace and cooperation, minimizing the impact of these disputes on the free flow of commerce.

With its headquarters in Washington, D.C., and offices across the country, the agency has, for decades, been providing dispute resolution and conflict management services for employers and unions across industries and work activities in the private, public, and federal sectors. FMCS has also been involved in facilitating negotiated rulemaking processes, which it says "saves millions of dollars and avoids years of delay in the rulemaking process." The agency's authorizing statute is in the U.S. Code at 29 U.S.C. ch. 7, subch. III.

=== Role in labor disputes ===
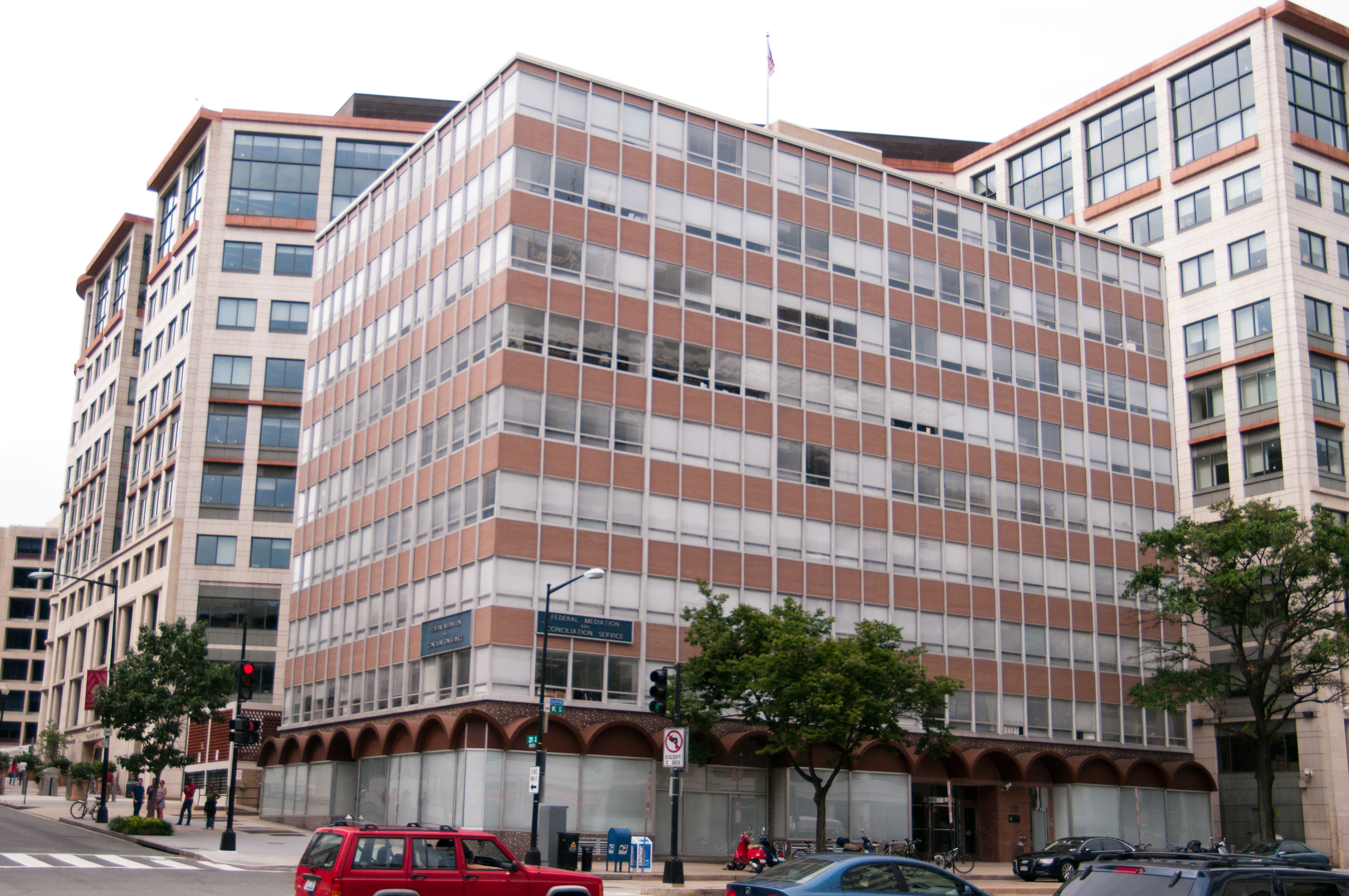
Former Federal Mediation and Conciliation Service headquarters in Washington, D.C. (now demolished)

The Federal Mediation and Conciliation Service was created as an independent agency of the federal government under the terms of the Labor Management Relations Act of 1947 (better known as the Taft–Hartley Act) to replace the United States Conciliation Service that previously operated within the Department of Labor. Under Taft-Hartley, FMCS may offer its services "in any labor dispute in any industry affecting commerce, either upon its own motion or upon the request of one or more of the parties to the dispute, whenever in its judgment such dispute threatens to cause a substantial interruption of commerce."

By statute, FMCS receives advance notification any time a party to a collective bargaining agreement intends to terminate or modify the contract upon expiration. No modification or termination of a collective bargaining agreement is permitted unless the party wishing to modify or terminate notifies the other party at least 60 days prior to expiration and, within 30 days after notice to the other party, notifies FMCS and applicable state mediation agencies. For healthcare institutions, the notice times are extended to 90 and 60 days respectively.

In the federal sector, use of FMCS services is voluntary. If FMCS cannot resolve a dispute, the Federal Service Impasses Panel is an entity within the Federal Labor Relations Authority that provides additional assistance.

=== Labor arbitration program ===
FMCS also has a large labor arbitration program. The agency maintains a roster of approximately 1,000 private arbitrators who are vetted based on their background, experience, and training in issues arising under collective bargaining agreements. Typically, more than 10,000 requests for arbitrator panels are received by FMCS each year from parties to labor-management grievance disputes. Panels are randomly drawn from the FMCS roster based on specified parameters, and the parties select an arbitrator who is then appointed by FMCS. Arbitrators must abide by the Code of Professional Responsibility for Arbitrators of Labor-Management Disputes, to which FMCS is a signatory; the Code is incorporated by reference in the Agency's federal regulations.

=== Shared Neutrals program ===
In 2018, FMCS began management of the Federal Shared Neutrals Program, an interagency collaborative effort in support of alternative dispute resolution, formerly operated as Sharing Neutrals by the U.S. Department of Health and Human Services. FMCS administers the program in the National Capital Region, in coordination with participating federal agencies that contribute to, and make use of, a pool of collateral-duty federal employees to mediate cases outside their own agency. In many regions of the country, Federal Executive Boards (FEBs) have created individual programs modeled after the DC-based program but run through each FEB. These programs continue separate operations, except for those who may wish to have FMCS administer their regional Shared Neutrals program.

Annually, the Shared Neutrals Program provides workplace mediation services for hundreds of cases across more than 50 participating agencies and sub-agencies, supported by a pool of more than 250 collateral-duty federal employees who are dedicated to assisting in the resolution of workplace disputes.

=== National Labor-Management Conference ===
FMCS hosts a biennial conference, the National Labor-Management Conference (NLMC), to promote better relationship and dispute management as a proactive means for preventing conflict that can impair organizational success. Historically, the NLMC attracted over 1000 industrial relations professionals, representatives of labor and management, academics, arbitrators and legal professionals across the labor relations and employment spectrum. The conference was held virtually in 2020 due to the COVID-19 pandemic. A conference, "Challenges and Choices at Work in a Time of Heightened Worker Activism", was held in June 2024.

=== International program ===
The Agency has an international program, partnering with countries to provide consulting and training in labor dispute resolution and the design of conflict management systems. These services are offered on a cost-reimbursement basis.

== Formation and directors ==
On August 7, 1947, President of the United States Harry S. Truman appointed Cyrus S. Ching as the first director of the FMCS. As Director of the FMCS, he received $12,000, placing the position at par with the National Labor Relations Board. Ching had been a member of the National War Labor Board until 1943, and had been an employee of the United States Rubber Company since 1919, serving as the firm's director of industrial and public relations in 1929. Ching would take office as of August 22, 1947, the date established in the Taft–Hartley Act for the creation of the FMCS as an independent agency, and would assume the role of the nation's top labor mediator from Edgar L. Warren, who had filled the senior mediation role for the U.S. Conciliation Service within the Labor Department. After conferring with the President in August, Ching stated that he would assume his role as director in early September upon the completion of his duties at U.S. Rubber. Ching stated that his role was to settle labor disputes at the level when and where they develop.

Ching was sworn into office on September 5, 1947, with an oath administered by Judge Henry White Edgerton at ceremonies also attended by Howard T. Colvin, who served as acting head from the August 22 creation of the FMCS, as well as other representatives of labor, industry and government.

=== Directors ===
Directors of the Federal Mediation and Conciliation Service (with the date they took office listed and the President who made the appointment shown in parentheses), are as follows:

1. Cyrus S. Ching (1947; Truman)
2. David L. Cole (1952; Truman)
3. Whitney P. McCoy (1953; Eisenhower)
4. Joseph F. Finnegan (1955; Eisenhower)
5. William E. Simkin (1961; Kennedy), the longest-serving Director, departing office in 1969
6. J. Curtis Counts (1970; Nixon)
7. William Usery, Jr. (1973; Nixon)
8. James F. Scearce (1976; Ford)
9. Wayne L. Horvitz (1977; Carter)
10. Kenneth Moffett (1982; Reagan), served for seven months.
11. Kay McMurray (1982; Reagan)
12. Bernard E. DeLury (1990; G. H. W. Bush)
13. John Calhoun Wells (1993; Clinton)
14. C. Richard Barnes (1999; Clinton)
15. Peter J. Hurtgen (2002; G. W. Bush)
16. Arthur F. Rosenfeld (2006; G. W. Bush)
17. George H. Cohen (2009; Obama)
18. Allison Beck (2014; Obama), the first woman to serve as director
19. Richard Giacolone (2018; Donald Trump)

== Notable roles and events ==
=== 1940s ===
Representatives of the FMCS played a role in negotiations between Bethlehem Shipbuilding Corporation and the Marine and Shipbuilding Workers in a strike that started in June 1947.

=== 1970s ===
In 1973, a Relationship-by-Objectives (RBO) program was developed for use in extreme cases of poor labor-management relations, when continued deterioration of the relationship could have drastic economic effect. The first RBO program was delivered in Maine on behalf of the Georgia-Pacific Company and Paperworkers Local 27.

In 1975, FMCS entered a new arena: Alternative dispute resolution (ADR). Congress passed Public Law 93-531, directing the Service to mediate a 100-year old land dispute between the Hopi and Navajo Indian Tribes in Arizona.

In 1978, Congress extended the FMCS charter to mediate disputes beyond the private sector to the Federal government. This was part of the Civil Service Reform Act, specifically the Federal Service Labor-Management Relations Statute. Also in 1978, the Labor-Management Cooperation Act directed FMCS to encourage cooperative activities between labor and management.

In November 1979, FMCS began mediating age discrimination complaints.

=== 1980s ===
In 1983, FMCS was the first agency to provide the service of negotiated rulemaking, or "reg-neg." Conducted with the Federal Aviation Administration and Department of Transportation, regulations were developed to deal with flight and duty time of pilots.

=== 1990s ===
The Administrative Dispute Resolution Act of 1990 and the Administrative Dispute Resolution Act of 1996 created the responsibility of every federal agency to look at its mission and to see what could be resolved through ADR techniques; also to establish an ADR coordinator, and to promote these efforts. FMCS testified and described the kind of work it did both for promoting ADR and negotiated rulemaking.

In 1996, representatives from FMCS facilitated an ADR process in Minnesota regarding land use issues in the Boundary Waters Canoe Area Wilderness (BWCAW) and in Voyageurs National Park (VNP). In addition to agreements reached on the BWCAW, the mediation team also announced agreements on strategies to handle problems in the park having to do with public safety, improved National Park Service consultation with local people, and other issues.

In 1997, representatives from FMCS mediated negotiations between United Parcel Service and the International Brotherhood of Teamsters. It required three weeks of mediation to bring an end to the largest national strike in two decades.

=== 2000s ===
In June 2002, representatives from FMCS facilitated National Institute of Standards and Technology (NIST) discussions in New York City regarding the scope of the subsequent building and fire safety investigation following the Sept. 11, 2001 terrorist attacks. The meetings, which were conducted over the course of five sessions, featured more than 30 speakers, many of whom had family members and friends who were killed in the collapse of the World Trade Center towers. The impact of FMCS' role was a successful discussion which provided important data for NIST's assessment and investigation.

=== 2010s ===
Representatives of the FMCS mediated negotiations between the National Football League and the National Football League Players Association in contract talks in February 2011. In November 2012, the National Hockey League and National Hockey League Players' Association agreed to submit their negotiations to the FMCS in an effort to resolve the 2012 NHL lockout.

In 2013, The Washington Examiner alleged that employees at the agency had made improper purchases, such as auto leases and spouses' cellular phones, using government credit cards. In response, the FMCS stated that the items were "the subject of a now-settled employment dispute involving a disgruntled FMCS employee", that the FMCS "conducted a prompt and thorough investigation and a review of our own internal processes", and "the allegations were dropped and outside authorities indicated they would take no further action." Congressional committee staff looked into the allegations and concluded their inquiries without making any findings against the agency or its employees.

In December 2015, representatives from FMCS facilitated a regulatory negotiations process with the US Department of Energy involving industry, labor groups, and environmentalists to help produce the biggest energy savings standards in US history.

In 2015, representatives of the FMCS mediated negotiations and agreement between the International Longshore and Warehouse Union and the Pacific Maritime Association covering operations at 29 U.S. ports on the Pacific coast. Subsequently, an extension to the contract was announced with a July 1, 2022 expiration date.

In February 2019, representatives of the FMCS mediated negotiations and agreement between the Denver Classroom Teachers Association and Denver Public School District, ending not only "the first teachers' strike in Denver in 25 years — it concludes 15 months of sometimes acrimonious negotiations."

From January to April 2019, FMCS facilitated regulatory negotiations meetings with the Department of Education. The meetings proposed changes/new regulations for the Federal Student Aid programs authorized under Title IV of the Higher Education Act of 1965 as amended. These particular negotiations were on the topic of Accreditation and Innovation, including TEACH grant requirements, Distance Learning and Faith-Based Institutions. The meetings were live-streamed and open to the public with time at the end of each day for public comment.

In April 2019, FMCS and the Equal Employment Opportunity Commission committed to work together to resolve federal workplace disputes by utilizing Alternate dispute resolution as a means of efficiently reducing the backlog of federal sector charges.

In June 2019, FMCS and the Federal Labor Relations Authority announced a commitment to work together to provide labor organizations and agencies with an opportunity to resolve negotiability appeals before they are considered by the Authority's members for a decision.

In August 2019, representatives of FMCS mediated negotiations between the State of Alaska and the Inlandboatmen's Union, ending a nine-day strike.

=== 2020s ===
In August 2020, representatives from Bath Iron Works and International Association of Machinists Local S6 signed an agreement with FMCS' assistance to end the shipyard worker strike in Bath, Maine. The 63-day strike drew national attention against the backdrop of a global pandemic and in an election year. President Trump said he was "glad to have helped"; the assistant to the president for trade and manufacturing, Peter Navarro, credited contributors including the deputy director of the Federal Mediation and Conciliation Services.

In April 2022, the National Labor Relations Board reminded its field offices about FMCS services and encouraged them to partner with FMCS mediators.

In 2022, FMCS announced that it would provide assistance with card check at no cost. It stopped supporting card check in March 2025.

=== Executive order on March 14, 2025 ===
On March 14, 2025 President Donald Trump signed an executive order stating that "the non-statutory components and functions" of a handful of governmental entities, including the FMCS, "shall be eliminated to the maximum extent consistent with applicable law".

== See also ==
- Title 29 of the Code of Federal Regulations
- National Academy of Arbitrators
