= Finnegan's Wake (disambiguation) =

Finnegans Wake is a 1939 novel by James Joyce.

Finnegan's Wake may also refer to:

- "Finnegan's Wake" (song), an Irish-American comic folk ballad, first published in New York in 1864
- "Finnegan's Wake" (Homicide: Life on the Street), an episode of the American police drama television series
- Finnegans Wake, an album by the electronic music group Tangerine Dream
