= John Finnegan (footballer) =

Scottish footballer

Personal information
- Date of birth: 3 July 1943 (age 83)
- Place of birth: Glasgow, Scotland
- Position: Left back

Senior career*
Years	Team	Apps	(Gls)
- Clydebank Juniors
1961–1963	Clyde	21	(0)
1963–1964	Millwall	6	(0)
- Gravesend & Northfleet
Total		27	(0)
- * Club domestic league appearances and goals

John Finnegan (born 3 July 1943) is a Scottish former footballer, who played left back in the Football League for Millwall.
