= Michael Finnegan (song) =

Repetitive children's song

"Michael Finnegan" (variant spellings include Michael Finnagen and Michael Vinnegan) is an unboundedly long song. The earliest documented reference is The Hackney Scout Song Book (Stacy & Son Ltd, 1921). It also appears in The Oxford Song Book, Vol.2, Collected and arranged by Thomas Wood (Oxford University Press, 1927). It has been assigned the number 10541 in the Roud Folk Song Index.
