= Alphonse Steinès =

Luxembourgish journalist who shaped the Tour de France (1873-1960)

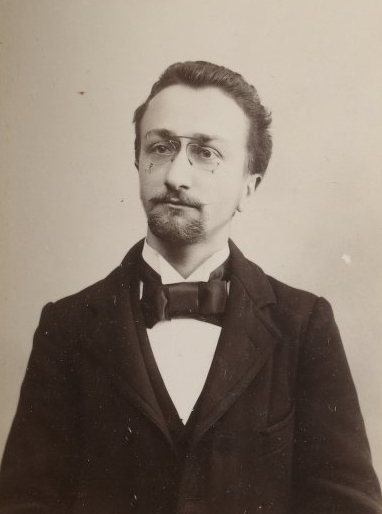
- Alphonse Steinès in 1898
- Born: Johann Stenges; August 25, 1873; Ahn, Wormeldange, Luxembourg
- Died: January 22, 1960 (aged 86); Paris 17th, France
- Occupation: Sports journalist

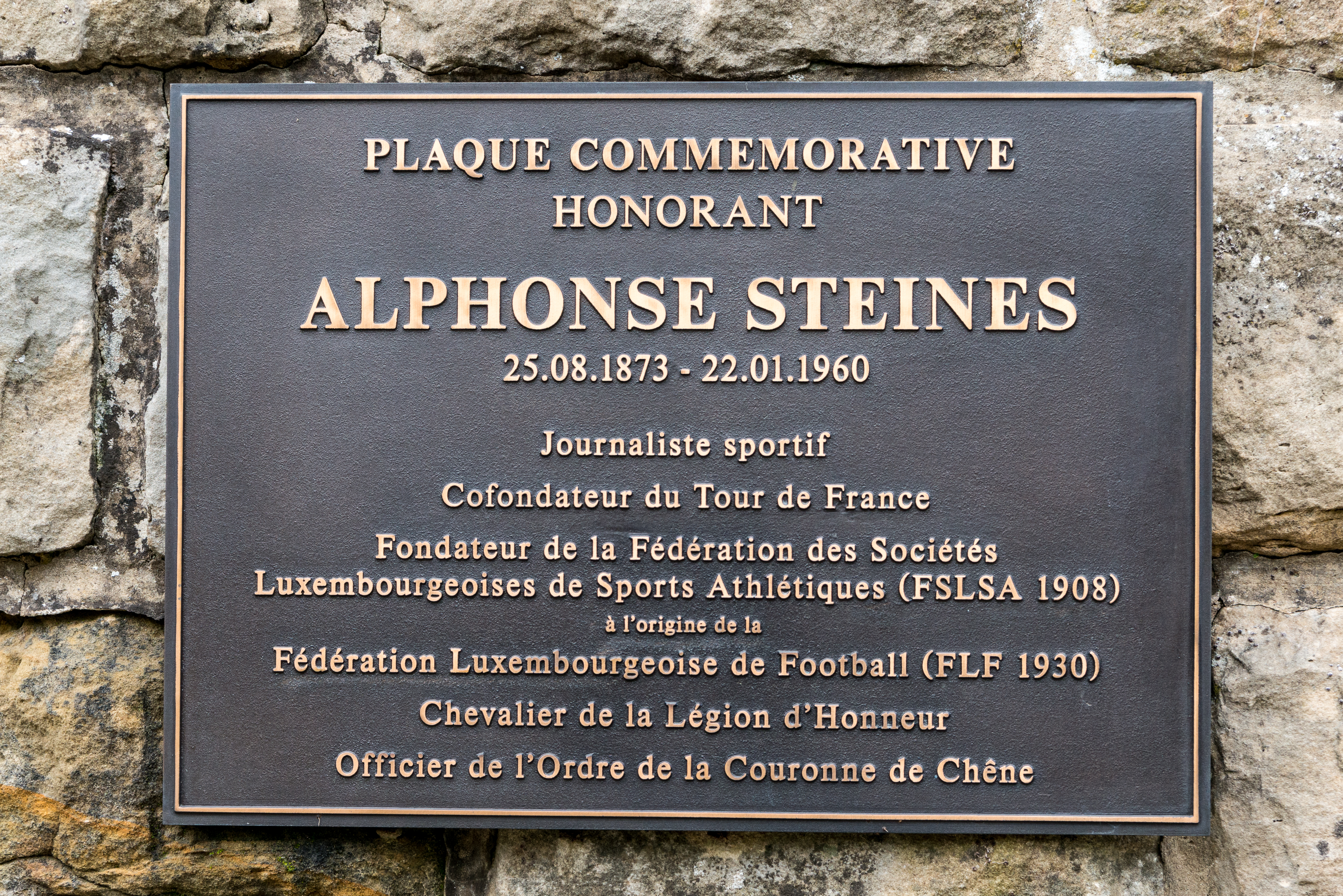
Plaque of Alphonse Steinès at Kierfecht Weimeschkierch

Alphonse Steinès (born Johann Stenges; August 25, 1873 – January 22, 1960) was a French sports journalist of Luxembourgish origin. A journalist at Le Vélo and later L'Auto, he played an important role in shaping the early Tour de France, especially by convincing director Henri Desgrange to route the race closer to the country's borders and through the high mountain passes of the Alps and Pyrenees. He was inducted into the Gloire du sport (French Sports Hall of Fame) in 2010.

== Biography ==
Alphonse Steinès was born in Ahn, part of Wormeldange, Luxembourg, on August 25, 1873. He left Luxembourg for Paris at the age of 14. There, he studied mechanics through evening classes at the École des arts et métiers. He bought his first bicycle in 1889 and became an accomplished cyclist. Victor Breyer introduced him to the Sport Vélocipédique Parisien and in 1894 brought him into Le Vélo as a journalist, where he became one of the main writers for the cycling section. He covered amateur cycling and the activities of cycling clubs. Steinès was involved in organizing races like Paris–Roubaix and became president of the Union des cyclistes de Paris in 1897.

In 1900 he joined L'Auto, a rival publication, where he led the sports societies section. Steinès had a significant influence on the route of the Tour de France, which began in 1903. He traveled around France to meet the paper’s correspondents and famously "scouted the 48 catalogued mountain passes in the French, Swiss, and Italian Alps to test new car brakes." From this, he became convinced that a cycling race could pass through these mountainous regions and urged Desgrange to do so in order to bring the race closer to the borders of France.

In the 1905 Tour de France, a successful stage through the foothills of the Alps between Grenoble and Gap won over Desgrange. By 1907, the Col de Porte was included. While Desgrange thought these efforts already tested the limits of human endurance, Steinès advocated for even greater challenges. He convinced a hesitant Desgrange to add the Pyrenees. These mountains first appeared on the route as a trial during the 1910 Tour de France, where the Portet-d'Aspet, Peyresourde, Aspin, Tourmalet, and Aubisque were crossed in one stage. The stage was won by eventual race winner Octave Lapize, who infamously shouted at Victor Breyer during the race: "You are criminals! Tell Desgrange from me. You cannot ask men to do such things!"

In the 1911 edition, the Tour included both the Alps and the Pyrenees, notably featuring the Col du Galibier for the first time. By pushing Desgrange to embrace the high mountains, Steinès helped shape the Tour into the iconic event known for its epic mountain stages.

In 1924 Steinès was one of the co-founders of the International Sports Press Association (usually abbreviated under the French name as AIPS), now based in Lausanne, Switzerland.

He died in 1960 at his home in Paris, and was buried in the family crypt in Weimerskirch cemetery in Luxembourg.

== Honours ==
- Knight of the Legion of Honour (France)
- Officer of the Order of the Oak Crown (Luxembourg)
- Grand Cross of the Civil Merit (Luxembourg)
