= Ahn =

Ahn or AHN may refer to:

== People ==
- Ahn (Korean surname), a Korean family name occasionally Romanized as An
- Kristie Ahn (born 1992), American tennis player
- Natalie Ahn (born 1957), American chemist and biochemist
- Philip Ahn (1905-1978), American actor
- Ralph Ahn (1926-2022), American actor
- Luis von Ahn, (born 1978) Guatemalan creator of CAPTCHA and co-founder of Duolingo

== Other uses ==
- Ahn, Luxembourg, a town
- Alice Ho Miu Ling Nethersole Hospital, a hospital in Tai Po, Hong Kong
- All Headline News, a US news agency
- Allegheny Health Network, a non-profit hospital and healthcare group in Pennsylvania
- Ashton-under-Lyne railway station, UK (National Rail code)
- Athens–Ben Epps Airport serving Athens-Clarke County, Georgia, US (IATA airport code)
- Nowl-Ahn, fictional character in the Image Universe series Supreme, Invincible, and Dynamo 5 known as Omni-Man
