= Machtum =

Coordinates: 49.6579365°N 6.4284181°E

Machtum (Luxembourgish: Meechtem) is a small town in the commune of Wormeldange, in south-eastern Luxembourg. As of 2026, the town has a population of 592. In the Moselle valley wine region, Machtum – along with Wormeldange, Ahn, and Ehnen – hosts the Riesling Open wine festival in September.
