= Gloire du sport =

French award

The Gloire du sport, or France National Sports Hall of Fame (French: Glory of Sport), is a Hall of Fame award that is given to former athletes, sports leaders, sports coaches and sports journalists, who have greatly contributed to sports in the country of France. The award is given by the Fédération des internationaux du sport français (Federation of French International Sports). The award was first given in 1993.

== Selection criteria ==
The award aims to reward individuals who have had an exemplary career in their fields. The first induction of Glories of Sport were awarded on March 12, 1993. Since then, new honorees are awarded each year. In order to be eligible for the award, if a nominee is still living, then a period of 10 years of time since the end of their career must have passed. In terms of selection criteria, in addition to pure sporting results, the individual's impact and influence on society are also considered.

== Most represented disciplines ==
Among some of the most represented disciplines are: athletics (29), cycling (27), fencing (20), alpine skiing (17), rugby (15), football (13), swimming (13), tennis (12), judo (12), mountaineering (10), basketball (9), rowing (9), aviation (8), boxing (8), wrestling (6), figure skating (5), canoeing (4).

== Glories of Sport A–F ==
Honoree	Year Awarded
Clément Ader	1994
Pierre Albaladejo	2004
Émile Allais	1993
Luc Alphand	2014
Manuel Amoros	2017
Guy Amouretti	2004
Georges André	1993
Jacques Anquetil	1993
Émile Anthoine	1995
Roger Antoine	2008
Joseph Apesteguy	1993
Jacques Augendre	2015
Jacqueline Auriol	1995
Isabelle Autissier	2011
Félicia Ballanger	2010
Roger Bambuck	2001
Guy Basquet	1998
Maryse Bastié	1997
Albert Batteux	1995
Roger Beaufrand	2008
Jean de Beaumont	1998
Jean Behra	2002
Yves Bergougnan	2009
Monique Berlioux	2005
Suzanne Berlioux	2001
Marcel Bernard	2002
Michel Bernard	2002
Colette Besson	2004
Jean-Paul Beugnot	2013
Louis Blériot	1995
Louison Bobet	1993
Robert Bobin	2003
Philippe Boisse	2006
Raymond Boisset	1998
Rolland Boitelle	2004
Jean Boiteux	1995
Adrienne Bolland	1999
Alain Bombard	2000
René Bondoux	1996
Honoré Bonnet	1996
Marguerite Bordes-Broquedis	2001
Jean Borotra	1993
Élisabeth Boselli	2002
Hélène Boucher	1996
Jean Bouin	1993
Christian Boussus	2000
Joël Bouzou	2016
Gilbert Bozon	1999
Georges Briquet	2008
Jean-Claude Brondani	2012
Élie Brousse	2018
Jacques Brugnon	1994
Pierre Brunet & Andrée Joly	1994
Georges Buchard	1999
André Buffière	1995
Jehan Buhan	1996
Robert Busnel	1994
Jacques Cachemire	2016
Alain Calmat	1996
Renée Camu	2005
Christine Caron	1997
Georges Carpentier	1993
Michel Carrega	1998
Christian Carrère	2000
Philippe Cattiau	1997
Marcel Cerdan	1993
Armand Charlet	1998
Philippe Chatrier	2004
Pierre Chayriguès	1994
Jacky Chazalon	2003
Eugène Christophe	2003
Robert Christophe	2010
Roger Closset	2012
Jean-Paul Coche	2011
Henri Cochet	1993
Anne-Marie Colchen	2002
Claude Collard	2003
Charles de Coquereaumont	2007
Daniel Costantini	2011
Jean Cottard	2012
Pierre de Coubertin	1994
Roger Coulon	1999
Henri Courtine	2001
James Couttet	1994
René Crabos	1995
Michel Crauste	1999
Marceau Crespin	2005
Eugène Criqui	1995
Richard Dacoury	2011
Alain Danet	2007
André Darrigade	2001
Julien Darui	1994
Alexandra David-Néel	2004
Danièle Debernard	2009
Henri Debrus	2006
Jean Debuf	2007
Max Decugis	2002
Henri Deglane	1994
Gaston Delaplane	1996
Henri Delaunay	2005
Henri Desgrange	1994
René Desmaison	2008
Bernard Destremau	1998
Brigitte Deydier	2012
Stéphane Diagana	2016
Jean Djorkaeff	2013
Maxime Dorigo	2011
Raymond Dot	2002
Georges Dransart	1997
Guy Drut	1997
Jacqueline du Bief	1995
Hervé Dubuisson	2012
Nicole Duclos	1999
Roger Ducret	1995
André Dufraisse	2005
René Duhamel	1996
François Dujardin	1996
Yves du Manoir	1994
Adrien Duvillard	2011
Henri Eberhardt	2005
Boughera El Ouafi	1995
Annie Famose	2001
Jacques Ferran	2017
Albert Ferrasse	2002
Alain Feuillette	2015
Just Fontaine	1995
Jacques Fouroux	2013
1966 Alpine Ski Team	2017
Roger Frison-Roche	1997

== Glories of Sport G–K ==
Honoree	Year Awarded
Jean Galfione	2014
Lucien Gamblin	2000
Jean Garaialde	1996
Edward Gardère	1996
Renée Garilhe	2010
Maurice Garin	1997
Gustave Garrigou	2008
Roland Garros	1997
Jean-Philippe Gatien	2013
Lucien Gaudin	1994
Alain Gerbault	1993
Maurice Gicquel	2011
Alain Giletti	1998
Alain Gilles	2007
Jacques Goddet	1995
Christine Goitschel	1993
Marielle Goitschel	1998
Edgar Grospiron	2013
Irène Guidotti	2014
Joseph Guillemot	1994
Jacques Guittet	2015
Fabrice Guy	2015
Jean-Jacques Guyon	2006
Michel Haguenauer	1997
Alphonse Halimi	1996
Marcel Hansenne	1995
Ignace Heinrich	1995
Jean de Herdt	1998
Virginie Hériot	1994
Maurice Herzog	1994
Béatrice Hess	2015
Michel Hidalgo	2015
Bernard Hinault	2000
Louis Hostin	1994
Maurice Houvion	2010
Michèle Jacot	2000
Alexandre Jany	1994
Adolphe Jauréguy	1994
Michel Jazy	1993
Sandra de Jenken Eversmann	2014
Myriam Fox-Jerusalmi	2011
Pierre Jonquères d'Oriola	1994
Robert Jonquet	2003
André Jousseaume	1996
Jean-Claude Killy	1993
Raymond Kopa	1993

== Glories of Sport L–P ==
Honoree	Year Awarded
Jacques Lacarrière	2007
Louis Lachenal	1995
Catherine Lacoste	1997
René Lacoste	1993
Simone Lacoste	2001
Léo Lacroix	2005
Jules Ladoumègue	1993
Denis Lalanne	2014
Jean-François Lamour	2008
Bernard Lapasset	2014
Roger Lapébie	1997
Octave Lapize	1994
André Leducq	1993
Janou Lefèbvre	1995
Suzanne Lenglen	1993
Roger Lerou	1997
Xavier Lesage	1995
Émile Levassor	1997
Félix Lévitan	1999
Pierre Lewden	1999
Alain Lunzenfichter	2016
Francis Luyce	1998
Marc Madiot	2017
Arthur Magakian	2009
Jean-Claude Magnan	1997
Antonin Magne	1995
Joseph Maigrot	2001
Bernard Malivoire	1998
Claude Mandonnaud	2006
Jules Marcadet	2002
Jacques Marchand	2011
Roger Marche	1995
Patrice Martin	2012
Séra Martin	2000
Marie Marvingt	1995
Armand Massard	1994
Arnaud Massy	2009
Simonne Mathieu	1995
Étienne Mattler	1995
Chantal Mauduit	1999
Georges Mauduit	2002
Pierre Mazeaud	2008
Gaston Mercier	1998
Carole Merle	2016
Gaston Meyer	2000
Lucien Mias	1995
Lucien Michard	1996
Thierry Michaud	2014
Roger Michelot	1997
Alice Milliat	1998
Alain Mimoun	1993
Isabelle Mir	2004
Bernard Monnereau	1996
Georges Monneret	1996
Mady Moreau	2005
Daniel Morelon	1994
Sophie Moressée-Pichot	2015
Alain Mosconi	2004
Michèle Mouton	2012
Camille Muffat	2017
Alfred Nakache	1995
Jean-Claude Nallet	2010
Claude Netter	2006
Paul Nicolas	1996
Christian Noël	2000
Jules Noël	1998
Philippe Omnès	2016
Jean-Michel Oprendek	2017
Henri Oreiller	1995
Christian d'Oriola	1993
Micheline Ostermeyer	1994
Robert Oubron	2006
Charles Pacôme	1996
Henri Padou	1994
Nelson Paillou	2006
Raoul Paoli	2002
Robert Paragot	2014
Robert Parienté	2007
Bernard Pariset	2006
Angelo Parisi	2004
Michel Pécheux	2007
Perrine Pelen	2011
Nicole Péllissard-Darrigrand	2003
Henri Pélissier	1993
Marie-José Pérec	2015
Young Perez	2007
Guy Périllat	1997
Lucien Petit-Breton	2004
Georges Pfeiffer	2013
Jean-Paul Pierrat	1999
Claude Piquemal	2012
Émile Pladner	1998
Michel Platini	1999
Catherine Plewinski	2013
Émile Poilvé	2000
Raymond Pointu	2013
Raphaël Poirée	2016
Paul Pons	2003
Jean-Michel Poulet	2017
Raymond Poulidor	1994
Jean Prat	1994
Alain Prost	2010
Puig-Aubert	1997

== Glories of Sport Q–U ==
Honoree	Year Awarded
Gaston Rébuffat	1996
Frantz Reichel	1994
Thierry Rey	2013
Philippe Riboud	2007
Georges Rigal	1995
Antoine Rigaudeau	2017
Elizabeth Riffiod	1993
Charles Rigoulot	1993
Jules Rimet	1994
Jean-Pierre Rives	2005
Roger Rivière	1995
Jean Robic	1999
Daniel Robin	1995
Jean-Luc Rougé	2003
Max Rousié	1999
Florian Rousseau	2012
Michel Rousseau	2009
Karine Ruby	2016
Georges de Saint-Clair	2000
Yves Saint-Martin	2000
Raymond Salles	1998
Bernard Schmetz	2009
Alfred Schoebel	2008
Jacques Secrétin	2006
Jean Séphériades	1994
Henri Sérandour	2010
Annette Sergent	2005
Victor Sillon	2008
Yannick Souvre	2013
Walter Spanghero	2003
Georges Speicher	2001
Éric Srecki	2010
Alphonse Steinès	2010
Florence Steurer	2007
Philippe Streiff	2012
Éric Tabarly	1994
Jean Taris	1993
Lionel Terray	1994
Charles Terront	1997
Bernard Thévenet	2009
Marcel Thil	1993
Jocelyne Triadou	2010
Pascale Trinquet	2003
Jean Urruty	1995

== Glories of Sport V–Z ==
Honoree	Year Awarded
Patrick Vajda	2009
Georges Vallerey Jr.	2001
Jacqueline Vaudecrane	1996
Paul-Émile Victor	1998
Tola Vologe	1996
Jean Vuarnet	1996
Jean-Pierre Wimille	1996
Gilles Zok	2009
