= 2011–12 Charlotte Bobcats season =

NBA professional basketball team season

- Head coach: Paul Silas
- President: Rod Higgins
- General manager: Rich Cho
- Owner: Michael Jordan
- Arena: Time Warner Cable Arena

Results
- Record: 7–59 (.106)
- Place: Division: 5th (Southeast); Conference: 15th (Eastern)
- Playoff finish: Did not Qualify
- Stats at Basketball Reference

Local media
- Television: Fox Sports Carolinas, SportSouth
- Radio: WFNZ

The 2011–12 Charlotte Bobcats season was the 8th season of the Charlotte Bobcats in the National Basketball Association (NBA), and the 22nd overall season of NBA basketball in Charlotte. Considered to be the worst NBA team of all time, the Bobcats failed to improve on their 34–48 record from the previous season and finished the season with a .106 winning percentage, surpassing the 1972–73 Philadelphia 76ers (.110) for the lowest winning percentage in NBA history. They were eliminated from playoff contention on March 28, 2012, after an 88–83 home loss to the Minnesota Timberwolves, with a record of 7–41. On March 17, 2012, the Bobcats had their final win of the season against the Toronto Raptors, narrowly avoiding tying the 1947–48 Providence Steamrollers (which played 18 fewer games) for the record of the lowest number of wins in NBA history. April was particularly unsuccessful, with the team failing to secure a single victory, embarking on a 23-game losing streak that lasted until the start of the following season. The Bobcats finished with the worst record in NBA history, in a shortened season or otherwise, by losing 104–84 to the New York Knicks in their final regular season game on April 26, 2012.

Guard-forward Gerald Henderson led the team in scoring, with an average of 15.1 points per game. Forward-center Bismack Biyombo led in rebounds per game (5.8), and point guard D. J. Augustin recorded a team-high 6.4 assists per game.

== Draft picks ==
Round	Pick	Player	Nationality	Position	School/club team
1	7	Bismack Biyombo	DR Congo	PF	Fuenlabrada (Spain)
1	9	Kemba Walker	United States	PG	Connecticut (Jr.)

== Roster ==
2011–12 Charlotte Bobcats roster
Players

Pos.	No.	Player	Height	Weight	DOB	From
F/C	0	Bismack Biyombo	6 ft 9 in (2.06 m)	245 lb (111 kg)	August 28, 1992	DR Congo
F	4	Derrick Brown	6 ft 8 in (2.03 m)	233 lb (106 kg)	September 7, 1987	Xavier
G	33	Matt Carroll	6 ft 6 in (1.98 m)	212 lb (96 kg)	August 28, 1980	Notre Dame
C	7	DeSagana Diop	7 ft 0 in (2.13 m)	280 lb (127 kg)	January 30, 1982	Oak Hill Academy (VA)
G	15	Gerald Henderson	6 ft 5 in (1.96 m)	215 lb (98 kg)	December 9, 1987	Duke
G	11	Cory Higgins	6 ft 5 in (1.96 m)	180 lb (82 kg)	June 14, 1989	Colorado
G/F	50	Corey Maggette	6 ft 6 in (1.98 m)	225 lb (102 kg)	November 12, 1979	Duke
F	9	Jamario Moon	6 ft 8 in (2.03 m)	205 lb (93 kg)	June 13, 1980	Meridian CC
F/C	22	Byron Mullens	7 ft 0 in (2.13 m)	275 lb (125 kg)	February 14, 1989	Ohio State
F	21	Eduardo Nájera	6 ft 8 in (2.03 m)	235 lb (107 kg)	July 11, 1976	Oklahoma
F	12	Tyrus Thomas	6 ft 10 in (2.08 m)	225 lb (102 kg)	August 17, 1986	LSU
G	1	Kemba Walker	6 ft 1 in (1.85 m)	184 lb (83 kg)	May 8, 1990	Connecticut
F	8	D. J. White	6 ft 9 in (2.06 m)	235 lb (107 kg)	August 31, 1986	Indiana
G/F	55	Reggie Williams	6 ft 6 in (1.98 m)	205 lb (93 kg)	September 14, 1986	VMI

Coaches
Head coach
- Paul Silas
Assistant(s)
- Stephen Silas
- Ralph Lewis
- Rob Werdann

Legend
- (DP) Unsigned draft pick
- (FA) Free agent
- (S) Suspended
- Injured

== Pre-season ==
Due to the 2011 NBA lockout negotiations, the programmed pre-season schedule, along with the first two weeks of the regular season were scrapped, and a two-game pre-season was set for each team once the lockout concluded.

2011 pre-season game log
Pre-season: 1–1 (home: 1–0; road: 0–1)

Game	Date	Team	Score	High points	High rebounds	High assists	Location Attendance	Record
1	December 19	Atlanta Hawks	W 79–77	Kemba Walker (18)	Derrick Brown (10)	D. J. Augustin (3)	Time Warner Cable Arena; 9,224	1–0
2	December 22	@ Atlanta Hawks	L 75–92	Corey Maggette (18)	DeSagana Diop (6)	Derrick Brown (4)	Philips Arena; 10,094	1–1

2011–12 season schedule

== Regular season ==
=== Standings ===
Southeast Division	W	L	PCT	GB	Home	Road	Div	GP
y-Miami Heat	46	20	.697	–	28–5	18–15	9–5	66
x-Atlanta Hawks	40	26	.606	6	23–10	17–16	11–3	66
x-Orlando Magic	37	29	.561	9	21–12	16–17	8–7	66
Washington Wizards	20	46	.303	26	11–22	9–24	7–7	66
Charlotte Bobcats	7	59	.106	39	4–29	3–30	1–14	66

Eastern Conference
#	Team	W	L	PCT	GB	GP
1	z-Chicago Bulls	50	16	.758	–	66
2	y-Miami Heat *	46	20	.697	4.0	66
3	x-Indiana Pacers *	42	24	.636	8.0	66
4	y-Boston Celtics	39	27	.591	11.0	66
5	x-Atlanta Hawks	40	26	.606	10.0	66
6	x-Orlando Magic	37	29	.561	13.0	66
7	x-New York Knicks	36	30	.545	14.0	66
8	x-Philadelphia 76ers	35	31	.530	15.0	66
9	Milwaukee Bucks	31	35	.470	19.0	66
10	Detroit Pistons	25	41	.379	25.0	66
11	Toronto Raptors	23	43	.348	27.0	66
12	New Jersey Nets	22	44	.333	28.0	66
13	Cleveland Cavaliers	21	45	.318	29.0	66
14	Washington Wizards	20	46	.303	30.0	66
15	Charlotte Bobcats	7	59	.106	43.0	66

=== Game log ===
2011–12 game log
Total: 7–59 (Home: 4–29; Road: 3–30)
December: 1–2 (home: 1–2; road: 0–0)

Game	Date	Team	Score	High points	High rebounds	High assists	Location Attendance	Record
1	December 26	Milwaukee	W 96–95	D. J. Augustin (19)	Boris Diaw (11)	Boris Diaw (9)	Time Warner Cable Arena; 17,173	1–0
2	December 28	Miami	L 95–96	Gerald Henderson (21)	Boris Diaw (16)	Boris Diaw (8)	Time Warner Cable Arena; 19,614	1–1
3	December 30	Orlando	L 79–130	Corey Maggette (20)	Corey Maggette; DeSagana Diop (7)	Boris Diaw (6)	Time Warner Cable Arena; 18,064	1–2

January : 2–17 (home: 1–6; road: 1–11)

Game	Date	Team	Score	High points	High rebounds	High assists	Location Attendance	Record
4	January 1	@ Miami	L 80–129	D. J. White (21)	Derrick Brown (7)	D. J. Augustin (7)	American Airlines Arena; 20,016	1–3
5	January 3	@ Cleveland	L 101–115	D. J. Augustin (26)	Corey Maggette (8)	D. J. Augustin (9)	Quicken Loans Arena; 14,173	1–4
6	January 4	@ New York	W 118–110	Boris Diaw (27)	D. J. White (9)	D. J. Augustin (10)	Madison Square Garden; 19,763	2–4
7	January 6	Atlanta	L 96–102 (OT)	D. J. Augustin (21)	D. J. Augustin (12)	D. J. White (9)	Time Warner Cable Arena; 17,827	2–5
8	January 7	@ Indiana	L 67–99	D. J. Augustin (20)	Byron Mullens (11)	D. J. Augustin (4)	Bankers Life Fieldhouse; 17,226	2–6
9	January 9	@ New York	L 77–91	Boris Diaw (19)	Boris Diaw (10)	Boris Diaw (7)	Madison Square Garden; 19,763	2–7
10	January 10	Houston	L 70–112	Byron Mullens (15)	Byron Mullens (10)	D. J. Augustin; Kemba Walker (3)	Time Warner Cable Arena; 13,421	2–8
11	January 12	@ Atlanta	L 81–131	Byron Mullens (21)	Boris Diaw (6)	D. J. Augustin (9)	Philips Arena; 10,597	2–9
12	January 13	Detroit	L 81–138	Byron Mullens (18)	Tyrus Thomas; Boris Diaw; Byron Mullens (7)	D. J. Augustin (13)	Time Warner Cable Arena; 18,043	2–10
13	January 14	Golden State	W 112–100	Gerald Henderson (26)	Byron Mullens (7)	D. J. Augustin (7)	Time Warner Cable Arena; 16,122	3–10
14	January 16	Cleveland	L 94–102	D. J. Augustin (24)	Byron Mullens (12)	D. J. Augustin (8)	Time Warner Cable Arena; 14,988	3–11
15	January 17	@ Orlando	L 79–116	Gerald Henderson (22)	Bismack Biyombo (10)	Kemba Walker (6)	Amway Center; 18,846	3–12
16	January 21	@ Chicago	L 79–125	Gerald Henderson (22)	Gerald Henderson (9)	D. J. Augustin; Matt Carroll (3)	United Center; 21,861	3–13
17	January 22	@ New Jersey	L 87–137	Kemba Walker (16)	Bismack Biyombo (7)	Boris Diaw (4)	Prudential Center; 10,035	3–14
18	January 24	New York	L 68–111	Kemba Walker (22)	Boris Diaw (6)	Kemba Walker; Cory Higgins (2)	Time Warner Cable Arena; 16,802	3–15
19	January 25	@ Washington	L 75–122	Matt Carroll (17)	Tyrus Thomas (9)	Kemba Walker (4)	Verizon Center; 15,286	3–16
20	January 27	@ Philadelphia	L 72–129	Kemba Walker (14)	Kemba Walker (8)	Matt Carroll (4)	Wells Fargo Center; 16,199	3–17
21	January 28	Washington	L 69–102	Byron Mullens (23)	Tyrus Thomas; Kemba Walker (10)	Kemba Walker (11)	Time Warner Cable Arena; 17,761	3–18
22	January 31	@ L. A. Lakers	L 73–106	Gerald Henderson (14)	DeSagana Diop (8)	Kemba Walker (6)	Staples Center; 18,997	3–19

February : 1–10 (home: 0–4; road: 1–6)

Game	Date	Team	Score	High points	High rebounds	High assists	Location Attendance	Record
23	February 1	@ Portland	L 68–112	Gerald Henderson (16)	Boris Diaw (6)	Boris Diaw; Kemba Walker; Cory Higgins (3)	Rose Garden; 20,608	3–20
24	February 4	@ Phoenix	L 69–95	Kemba Walker (22)	Tyrus Thomas (13)	Reggie Williams (6)	US Airways Center; 14,928	3–21
25	February 7	@ Boston	L 74–94	Reggie Williams (21)	Kemba Walker (7)	Reggie Williams (5)	TD Garden; 18,624	3–22
26	February 10	Chicago	L 64–105	Derrick Brown (10)	Bismack Biyombo (10)	Boris Diaw (6)	Time Warner Cable Arena; 19,379	3–23
27	February 11	L. A. Clippers	L 86–121	Kemba Walker (19)	Bismack Biyombo; Corey Maggette (6)	Kemba Walker (4)	Time Warner Cable Arena; 19,110	3–24
28	February 13	Philadelphia	L 89–108	Corey Maggette (22)	Byron Mullens (9)	Boris Diaw (10)	Time Warner Cable Arena; 13,773	3–25
29	February 15	@ Minnesota	L 90–132	Kemba Walker (21)	Boris Diaw (9)	Boris Diaw (7)	Target Center; 15,139	3–26
30	February 17	@ Toronto	W 98–91	Reggie Williams (22)	Bismack Biyombo (13)	D. J. Augustin (10)	Air Canada Centre; 15,575	4–26
31	February 19	@ Indiana	L 73–118	Derrick Brown (16)	Bismack Biyombo (8)	Kemba Walker (5)	Bankers Life Fieldhouse; 11,673	4–27
32	February 22	Indiana	L 68–102	Corey Maggette (20)	Boris Diaw (11)	Boris Diaw (8)	Time Warner Cable Arena; 13,478	4–28
33	February 29	@ Detroit	L 84–109	Corey Maggette (17)	Boris Diaw (6)	D. J. Augustin (10)	The Palace of Auburn Hills; 14,534	4–29

March : 3–14 (home: 2–8; road: 1–6)

Game	Date	Team	Score	High points	High rebounds	High assists	Location Attendance	Record
34	March 2	@ San Antonio	L 72–133	Boris Diaw; Corey Maggette (14)	DeSagana Diop (7)	D. J. Augustin; Kemba Walker (5)	AT&T Center; 18,581	4–30
35	March 4	New Jersey	L 101–104	Corey Maggette (24)	Corey Maggette (7)	Boris Diaw (8)	Time Warner Cable Arena; 13,564	4–31
36	March 6	Orlando	W 100–84	Corey Maggette (29)	Bismack Biyombo (15)	D. J. Augustin; Kemba Walker (8)	Time Warner Cable Arena; 13,110	5–31
37	March 7	Utah	L 93–109	Corey Maggette (25)	Bismack Biyombo (9)	D. J. Augustin (8)	Time Warner Cable Arena; 10,891	5–32
38	March 9	New Jersey	L 74–103	Corey Maggette (19)	Bismack Biyombo (11)	D. J. Augustin (8)	Time Warner Cable Arena; 14,672	5–33
39	March 10	@ Oklahoma City	L 79–122	D. J. Augustin (22)	Bismack Biyombo (8)	D. J. Augustin (7)	Chesapeake Energy Arena; 18,203	5–34
40	March 12	@ New Orleans	W 73–71	Gerald Henderson (15)	Bismack Biyombo; Tyrus Thomas (7)	D. J. Augustin (5)	New Orleans Arena; 15,254	6–34
41	March 14	@ Houston	L 77–107	Derrick Brown (15)	Bismack Biyombo (5)	Kemba Walker (8)	Toyota Center; 18,128	6–35
42	March 15	@ Dallas	L 76–101	Corey Maggette (21)	Bismack Biyombo (11)	D. J. Augustin; Kemba Walker (4)	American Airlines Center; 20,507	6–36
43	March 17	Toronto	W 107–103	Gerald Henderson (24)	Bismack Biyombo (9)	D. J. Augustin (11)	Time Warner Cable Arena; 15,108	7–36
44	March 19	Philadelphia	L 80–105	Gerald Henderson (14)	Bismack Biyombo (9)	D. J. Augustin; Kemba Walker (5)	Time Warner Cable Arena; 12,792	7–37
45	March 23	Milwaukee	L 82–112	Gerald Henderson (29)	Tyrus Thomas (7)	Kemba Walker (7)	Time Warner Cable Arena; 13,729	7–38
46	March 24	@ New Jersey	L 79–102	Byron Mullens (17)	Byron Mullens (10)	D. J. Augustin (8)	Prudential Center; 13,297	7–39
47	March 26	Boston	L 95–132	Gerald Henderson (21)	Byron Mullens (7)	Derrick Brown; Kemba Walker (7)	Time Warner Cable Arena; 16,357	7–40
48	March 28	Minnesota	L 83–115	Corey Maggette (22)	Eduardo Nájera (8)	D. J. Augustin (8)	Time Warner Cable Arena; 10,540	7–41
49	March 30	Denver	L 88–119	Gerald Henderson (21)	Byron Mullens (10)	D. J. Augustin (8)	Time Warner Cable Arena; 13,806	7–42
50	March 31	@ Detroit	L 107–110 (OT)	Byron Mullens (20)	Byron Mullens (9)	D. J. Augustin (10)	The Palace of Auburn Hills; 17,082	7–43

April : 0–16 (home: 0–9; road: 0–7)

Game	Date	Team	Score	High points	High rebounds	High assists	Location Attendance	Record
51	April 3	@ Toronto	L 77–92	Byron Mullens (20)	Byron Mullens (14)	D. J. Augustin; Kemba Walker (7)	Air Canada Centre; 14,640	7–44
52	April 4	@ Atlanta	L 83–120	Kemba Walker (21)	Gerald Henderson; Byron Mullens (7)	Kemba Walker (5)	Philips Arena; 13,046	7–45
53	April 6	@ Milwaukee	L 70–95	Byron Mullens (31)	Bismack Biyombo; Byron Mullens (14)	Kemba Walker (8)	Bradley Center; 13,374	7–46
54	April 7	Atlanta	L 96–126	Cory Higgins (22)	Bismack Biyombo; D. J. White (5)	Kemba Walker (6)	Time Warner Cable Arena; 14,715	7–47
55	April 9	Washington	L 85–123	Corey Maggette (23)	Derrick Brown (8)	Kemba Walker (7)	Time Warner Cable Arena; 10,303	7–48
56	April 10	@ Cleveland	L 90–123	Gerald Henderson (21)	Bismack Biyombo (8)	D. J. Augustin (11)	Quicken Loans Arena; 13,576	7–49
57	April 12	Detroit	L 85–119	D. J. Augustin; Derrick Brown (13)	Byron Mullens (6)	D. J. Augustin (5)	Time Warner Cable Arena; 10,828	7–50
58	April 13	@ Miami	L 72–105	Derrick Brown (21)	Derrick Brown (9)	D. J. Augustin (6)	American Airlines Arena; 19,600	7–51
59	April 15	Boston	L 82–124	Gerald Henderson (22)	Bismack Biyombo; Derrick Brown (7)	D. J. Augustin (10)	Time Warner Cable Arena; 15,169	7–52
60	April 16	New Orleans	L 67–95	Gerald Henderson (27)	Byron Mullens (10)	Derrick Brown; Kemba Walker (3)	Time Warner Cable Arena; 10,876	7–53
61	April 18	Chicago	L 68–110	Kemba Walker (16)	Bismack Biyombo (13)	Kemba Walker (5)	Time Warner Cable Arena; 14,221	7–54
62	April 20	Memphis	L 80–115	Gerald Henderson (32)	Byron Mullens (11)	Kemba Walker (5)	Time Warner Cable Arena; 13,428	7–55
63	April 22	Sacramento	L 78–114	Kemba Walker; Byron Mullens; Derrick Brown (13)	Byron Mullens (8)	Kemba Walker (11)	Time Warner Cable Arena; 11,317	7–56
64	April 23	@ Washington	L 73–111	Gerald Henderson (19)	Byron Mullens (8)	D. J. Augustin (6)	Verizon Center; 17,355	7–57
65	April 25	@ Orlando	L 75–102	D. J. Augustin (23)	Kemba Walker (9)	D. J. Augustin (6)	Amway Center; 19,152	7–58
66	April 26	New York	L 84–104	Gerald Henderson (21)	Jamario Moon (8)	D. J. Augustin (7)	Time Warner Cable Arena; 16,023	7–59

2011–12 season schedule

== Player statistics ==
=== Regular season ===
Player	POS	GP	GS	MP	REB	AST	STL	BLK	PTS	MPG	RPG	APG	SPG	BPG	PPG
Kemba Walker	PG	66	25	1,792	234	289	60	20	799	27.2	3.5	4.4	.9	.3	12.1
Byron Mullens	C	65	25	1,465	327	57	21	52	606	22.5	5.0	.9	.3	.8	9.3
Derrick Brown	SF	65	17	1,443	236	67	48	12	524	22.2	3.6	1.0	.7	.2	8.1
Bismack Biyombo	C	63	41	1,455	368	27	20	115	327	23.1	5.8	.4	.3	1.8	5.2
D. J. White	PF	58	11	1,098	209	47	17	23	392	18.9	3.6	.8	.3	.4	6.8
Gerald Henderson Jr.	SG	55	55	1,831	225	126	49	20	830	33.3	4.1	2.3	.9	.4	15.1
Tyrus Thomas	PF	54	30	1,013	200	35	36	60	304	18.8	3.7	.6	.7	1.1	5.6
Matt Carroll	SG	53	2	596	58	38	16	7	142	11.2	1.1	.7	.3	.1	2.7
D. J. Augustin	PG	48	46	1,408	109	307	36	1	532	29.3	2.3	6.4	.8	.0	11.1
Cory Higgins	PG	38	0	423	35	36	5	6	150	11.1	.9	.9	.1	.2	3.9
Boris Diaw^{†}	PF	37	28	1,018	195	158	20	19	272	27.5	5.3	4.3	.5	.5	7.4
Reggie Williams	SF	33	13	747	93	60	20	3	274	22.6	2.8	1.8	.6	.1	8.3
Corey Maggette	SF	32	28	881	125	39	23	1	480	27.5	3.9	1.2	.7	.0	15.0
DeSagana Diop	C	27	9	325	85	23	6	13	31	12.0	3.1	.9	.2	.5	1.1
Eduardo Nájera	PF	22	0	270	50	12	19	4	58	12.3	2.3	.5	.9	.2	2.6
Jamario Moon	SF	8	0	123	22	5	1	5	18	15.4	2.8	.6	.1	.6	2.3

- ^{†} Denotes player spent time with another team in the season. Stats reflect time with the Bobcats only.

== Transactions ==
=== Overview ===
Players Added

Via draft

- Bismack Biyombo
- Kemba Walker

Via trade

- Corey Maggette
- Byron Mullens

Via free agency

- Derrick Brown
- Melvin Ely
- Reggie Williams
- Ben Uzoh
- Cory Higgins
Players Lost

Via trade

- Stephen Jackson
- Shaun Livingston

Via free agency

- Kwame Brown
- Dante Cunningham
- Joel Przybilla
- Jamario Moon

Waived

- Boris Diaw
- Melvin Ely
- Ben Uzoh

=== Trades ===
June 23, 2011	To Charlotte Bobcats Corey Maggette; Draft rights to Bismack Biyombo	To Milwaukee Bucks Stephen Jackson; Shaun Livingston; Beno Udrih; Draft rights to Tobias Harris To Sacramento Kings John Salmons; Draft rights to Jimmer Fredette
June 23, 2011	To Charlotte Bobcats Cash considerations	To Milwaukee Bucks Draft rights to Jeremy Tyler
December 19, 2011	To Charlotte Bobcats Byron Mullens	To Oklahoma City Thunder Conditional 2012 second-round pick

=== Free agents ===
Additions
Player	Date signed	Former team
Derrick Brown	December 9	New York Knicks
Melvin Ely	December 14	Denver Nuggets
Reggie Williams	December 15	Golden State Warriors
Ben Uzoh	December 19	New Jersey Nets
Cory Higgins	December 25	Denver Nuggets
Jamario Moon	April 15	Los Angeles D-Fenders (D-League

Subtractions
Player	Date signed	New team
Kwame Brown	December 14	Golden State Warriors
Dante Cunningham	December 24	Memphis Grizzlies
Joel Przybilla	February 27	Portland Trail Blazers

Many players signed with teams from other leagues due to the 2011 NBA lockout. FIBA allowed players under NBA contracts to sign and play for teams from other leagues if the contracts have opt-out clauses that allow the players to return to the NBA if the lockout ends. The Chinese Basketball Association, however, only allowed its clubs to sign foreign free agents who could play for at least the entire 2011–12 CBA season in China.

Played in other leagues during lockout
Player	Date signed	New team	Opt-out clause
Garrett Temple	July 27	Fastweb Casale (Italy)	No
Boris Diaw	September 27	JSA Bordeaux Basket (France)	Yes
