= Élisabeth Riffiod =

French basketball player

Élisabeth Riffiod (born 20 July 1947) is a former French women's professional basketball player. With 247 games played with the national team and 6 French championships won, she is considered as one of the best French centers to ever play the game.

She was awarded with the Glory of Sport in 1993. She was inducted into the French Basketball Hall of Fame, in 2006.

== Personal life ==
After her basketball playing career, she was a biology professor at the University of Bordeaux.

Her son, Boris Diaw, also is a professional basketball player, having competed for several European and NBA teams, and winning an NBA championship with the San Antonio Spurs. Her oldest son, Martin, also became a professional basketball player, notably playing for the JSA Bordeaux basket.
