= Boris Diaw =

French basketball executive & player (born 1982)

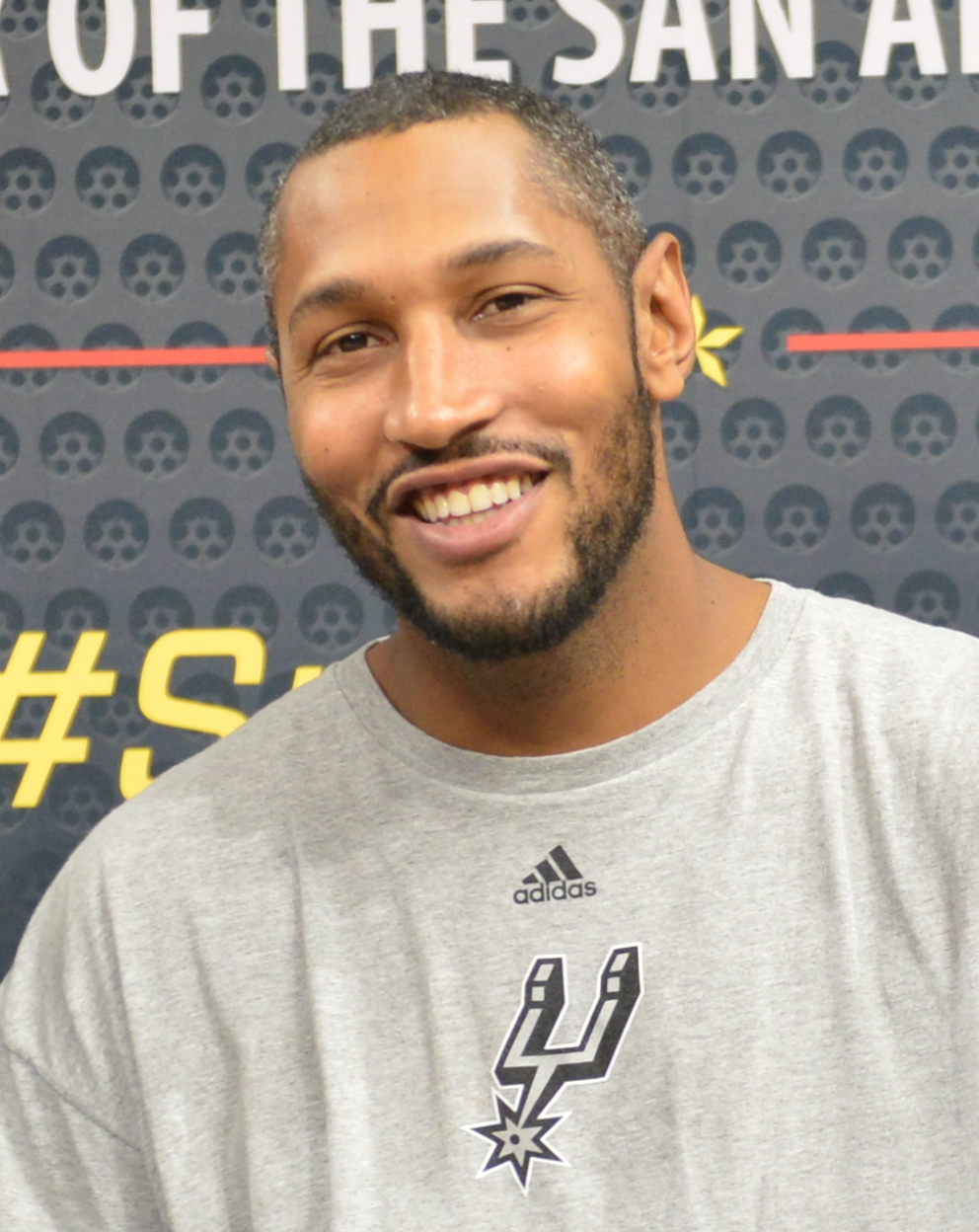
- Diaw with the San Antonio Spurs in 2015

Metropolitans 92
- Title: President
- League: LNB Pro A

Personal information
- Born: 16 April 1982 (age 44) Cormeilles-en-Parisis, Val-d'Oise, France
- Listed height: 6 ft 8 in (2.03 m)
- Listed weight: 250 lb (113 kg)

Career information
- High school: INSEP (Paris, France)
- NBA draft: 2003: 1st round, 21st overall pick
- Drafted by: Atlanta Hawks
- Playing career: 2001–2018
- Position: Power forward / shooting guard
- Number: 32, 13, 3, 33

Career history
- 1998–2000: Centre Fédéral
- 2000–2003: Pau-Orthez
- 2003–2005: Atlanta Hawks
- 2005–2008: Phoenix Suns
- 2008–2012: Charlotte Bobcats
- 2011: JSA Bordeaux
- 2012–2016: San Antonio Spurs
- 2016–2017: Utah Jazz
- 2017–2018: Levallois Metropolitans

Career highlights
- NBA champion (2014); NBA Most Improved Player (2006); 2× LNB Pro A champion (2001, 2003); LNB Pro A MVP (2003); LNB Pro A First Team (2003); LNB Pro A Best Young Player (2002); 2× French Basketball Cup champion (2002, 2003)

Career statistics
- Points: 9,139 (8.6 ppg)
- Rebounds: 4,634 (4.4 rpg)
- Assists: 3,684 (3.5 apg)
- Stats at NBA.com
- Stats at Basketball Reference
Medals
Men's basketball
Representing France
World Cup
Bronze medal – third place	2014 Spain
EuroBasket
Gold medal – first place	2013 Slovenia
Silver medal – second place	2011 Lithuania
Bronze medal – third place	2005 Serbia and Montenegro
Bronze medal – third place	2015 France–Croatia–Germany–Latvia
FIBA Europe Under-18 Championship
Gold medal – first place	2000 Croatia	U-18 Team
FIBA Europe Under-20 Championship
Bronze medal – third place	2002 Lithuania	U-20 Team

Boris Babacar Diaw-Riffiod (born 16 April 1982), better known as Boris Diaw, is a French basketball executive and former player who is the president of Metropolitans 92 of LNB Pro A. Diaw began his playing career in Pro A and returned to that league after 14 seasons in the National Basketball Association (NBA). He primarily played the power forward position. In 2006, Diaw was named the NBA's Most Improved Player as a member of the Phoenix Suns. He won an NBA championship with the San Antonio Spurs in 2014.

Diaw was a member and captain of the senior French national team. He won a FIBA World Cup bronze medal in 2014, a EuroBasket title in 2013, a silver medal in EuroBasket 2011, and two bronze in EuroBasket 2005 and EuroBasket 2015. He earned an All-EuroBasket Team selection in 2005.

Diaw has served as president of Metropolitans 92 from July 2019 to April 2020.

== Professional basketball career ==
=== Pau-Orthez (2001–2003) ===
From 2001 to 2003, Diaw played for Pau-Orthez of the LNB Pro A, a French professional basketball league. In 2002, he competed in the league's All-Star game and the Slam Dunk contest.

=== Atlanta Hawks (2003–2005) ===
Diaw was selected by the Atlanta Hawks with the 21st overall pick in the 2003 NBA draft. On July 10, 2003, he signed a multi-year deal with the Hawks.

=== Phoenix Suns (2005–2008) ===
In August 2005, he was traded with two future first-round picks to the Phoenix Suns in exchange for future teammate Joe Johnson.

In Phoenix, Diaw blossomed into an all-round player, playing any position from center to point guard and garnered the nickname "3D" because of his multidimensional play (his motto being "drive, dish, defend") and the combination of his number (3) and surname. Diaw averaged 13.3 points, 6.9 rebounds, 6.2 assists and 1.0 blocks per game on 52.6% field goal shooting and 73.1% from the free throw line in the 2005–06 season where he played both forward positions and then center after injuries to Amar'e Stoudemire and Kurt Thomas.

During the 2006 NBA playoffs, as the Suns' starting center, Diaw averaged 18.7 points, 6.7 rebounds, 5.2 assists and 1.1 blocks per game. In Game 1 of the 2006 Western Conference Finals against the Dallas Mavericks, Diaw scored a career-high 34 points, including the game-winner with 0.5 seconds remaining in regulation, to help the Suns to a 121–118 victory, although Phoenix would go on the lose the series in six games.

=== Charlotte Bobcats (2008–2012) ===
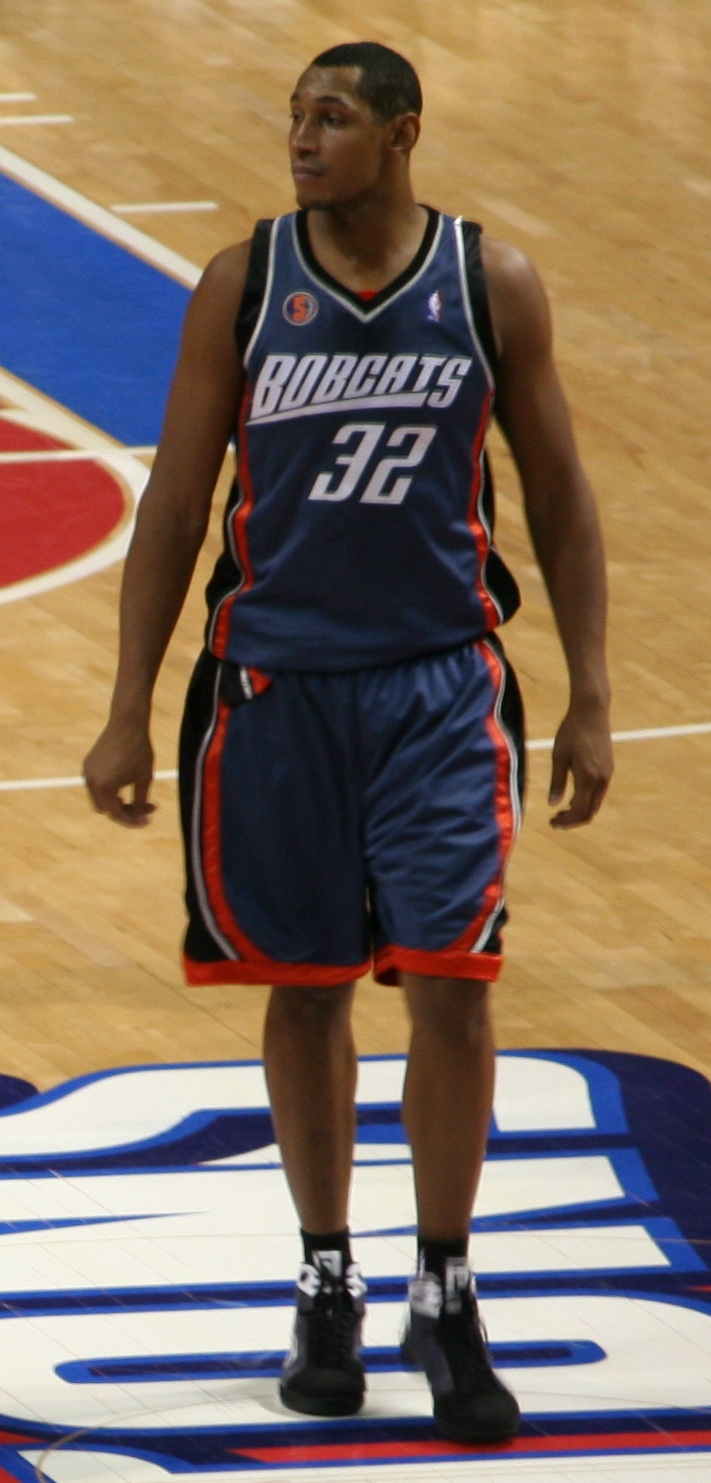
Diaw with the Bobcats in 2009

On December 10, 2008, Diaw, along with Raja Bell and Sean Singletary, was traded to the Charlotte Bobcats in exchange for Jason Richardson and Jared Dudley.

On September 28, 2011, Diaw signed with JSA Bordeaux of France for the duration the 2011 NBA lockout. In December 2011, he returned to the Charlotte Bobcats.

On March 21, 2012, Diaw was waived by the Bobcats.

=== San Antonio Spurs (2012–2016) ===
Two days later, he signed with the San Antonio Spurs for the rest of the season.

On July 12, 2012, Diaw re-signed with the Spurs to a reported two-year, $9.2 million deal. Diaw helped the Spurs reach the 2013 NBA Finals where they faced the Miami Heat. San Antonio lost the series in seven games.

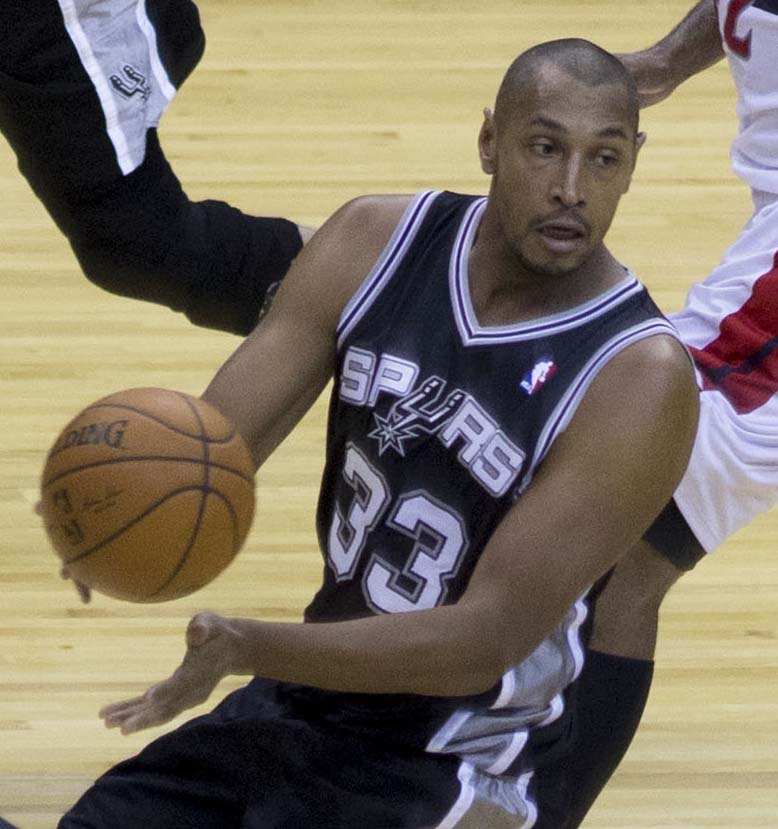
Diaw playing for the Spurs in 2014

On June 15, 2014, Diaw won his first NBA championship after the Spurs defeated the Miami Heat 4–1 in the 2014 NBA Finals. He was inserted into the starting lineup beginning with Game 3, in order to counter Miami's "small ball lineup". Known for his high basketball IQ, Diaw also increased offensive efficiency for the Spurs via his vision and passing game, while being more versatile on defense than Tiago Splitter^{,}. As a result, Diaw led all players in the series in total assists (29) and was second in total rebounds (43) behind teammate Tim Duncan (50). Diaw averaged 35 minutes per game in the Finals, an increase of over 10 minutes from the regular season.

On July 15, 2014, Diaw re-signed with the Spurs to a reported three-year, $22 million contract.

On August 1, 2015, Diaw played for Team Africa at the 2015 NBA Africa exhibition game.

=== Utah Jazz (2016–2017) ===
On July 8, 2016, Diaw was traded, along with a 2022 second-round pick and cash considerations, to the Utah Jazz in exchange for the rights to Olivier Hanlan. In early November 2016, Diaw missed eight games with a right leg contusion. On July 13, 2017, he was waived by the Jazz.

=== Levallois Metropolitans (2017–2018) ===
On September 17, 2017, Diaw signed with the Levallois Metropolitans, a French team, for the 2017–18 season. With Levallois, he played in the LNB Pro A and EuroCup. He averaged 11.1 points, 6.4 rebounds in 31.2 minutes per game in 31 Pro A games.

=== Retirement ===
Diaw announced his retirement via his Twitter account on September 6, 2018.

== NBA career statistics ==
Legend
GP	Games played	GS	Games started	MPG	Minutes per game
FG%	Field goal percentage	3P%	3-point field goal percentage	FT%	Free throw percentage
RPG	Rebounds per game	APG	Assists per game	SPG	Steals per game
BPG	Blocks per game	PPG	Points per game	**Bold**	Career high
†	Won an NBA championship	*	Led the league

=== Regular season ===
Year	Team	GP	GS	MPG	FG%	3P%	FT%	RPG	APG	SPG	BPG	PPG
2003–04	Atlanta	76	37	25.3	.447	.231	.602	4.5	2.4	.8	.5	4.5
2004–05	Atlanta	66	25	18.2	.422	.180	.740	2.6	2.3	.6	.3	4.8
2005–06	Phoenix	81	70	35.5	.526	.267	.731	**6.9**	**6.2**	.7	**1.0**	13.3
2006–07	Phoenix	73	59	31.1	.538	.333	.683	4.3	4.8	.4	.5	9.7
2007–08	Phoenix	**82***	19	28.1	.477	.317	.744	4.6	3.9	.7	.5	8.8
2008–09	Phoenix	22	0	24.5	.567	.357	.692	3.8	2.1	.5	.4	8.3
2008–09	Charlotte	59	59	**37.6**	.495	.419	.686	5.9	4.9	.8	.7	**15.1**
2009–10	Charlotte	**82***	**82***	35.4	.483	.320	.769	5.2	4.0	.7	.7	11.3
2010–11	Charlotte	**82**	**82***	33.9	.492	.345	.683	5.0	4.1	**.9**	.6	11.3
2011–12	Charlotte	37	28	27.5	.410	.267	.630	5.3	4.3	.5	.5	7.4
2011–12	San Antonio	20	7	20.3	**.588**	**.615**	.625	4.3	2.4	.7	.3	4.7
2012–13	San Antonio	75	20	22.8	.539	.385	.723	3.4	2.4	.7	.4	5.8
2013–14†	San Antonio	79	24	25.0	.521	.402	.739	4.1	2.8	.6	.4	9.1
2014–15	San Antonio	81	15	24.5	.460	.320	**.774**	4.3	2.9	.4	.3	8.7
2015–16	San Antonio	76	4	18.2	.527	.362	.737	3.1	2.3	.3	.3	6.4
2016–17	Utah	73	33	17.6	.446	.247	.743	2.2	2.3	.2	.1	4.6
Career		1064	564	27.0	.493	.336	.717	4.4	3.5	.6	.5	8.6

=== Playoffs ===
Year	Team	GP	GS	MPG	FG%	3P%	FT%	RPG	APG	SPG	BPG	PPG
2006	Phoenix	20	**20**	**39.8**	.526	.429	.761	**6.7**	**5.2**	**.9**	**1.1**	**18.7**
2007	Phoenix	10	0	23.5	.475	.000	.667	3.2	3.0	.7	.2	6.6
2008	Phoenix	5	2	35.6	**.547**	.000	.500	5.6	4.6	.6	.8	14.6
2010	Charlotte	4	4	38.0	.500	.111	.500	5.0	4.0	.3	.8	7.5
2012	San Antonio	14	14	24.7	.514	**.500**	.750	5.2	2.5	.8	.3	6.2
2013	San Antonio	16	1	17.1	.444	.385	.857	2.5	1.8	.3	.2	4.1
2014†	San Antonio	**23**	3	26.3	.500	.400	.688	4.9	3.4	.6	.1	9.2
2015	San Antonio	7	0	28.3	.479	.222	.692	6.1	3.6	.7	.4	11.6
2016	San Antonio	9	0	17.7	.457	.333	.750	2.1	2.3	.2	.4	5.2
2017	Utah	11	9	18.4	.500	.429	**.900**	1.9	2.0	.6	.4	5.7
Career		119	53	26.4	.504	.336	.736	4.4	3.2	.6	.4	9.2

== National team career ==
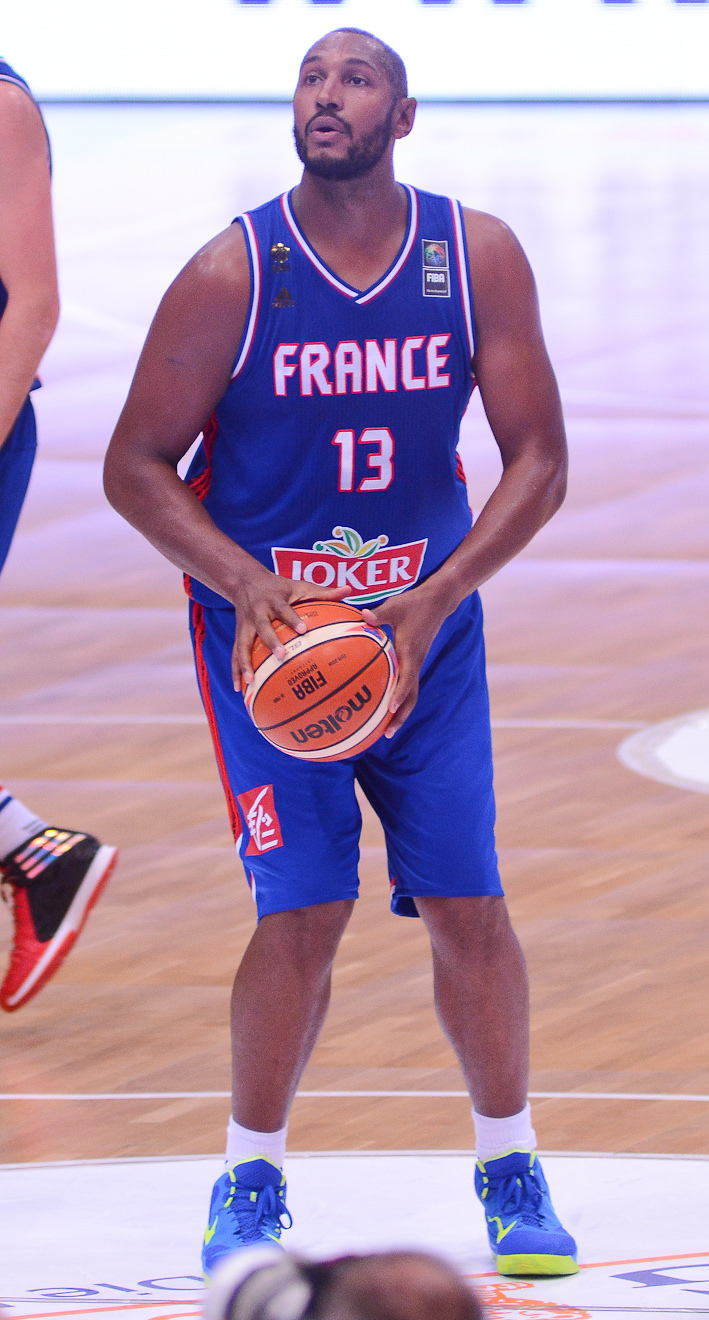
Diaw playing for France in 2015.

In 2000, Diaw won the FIBA Europe Under-18 Championship with the French junior national team. In July 2006, Diaw was named the captain of the senior men's French national basketball team. He won the bronze medal at the EuroBasket 2005.

Diaw led the French team at the 2006 FIBA World Championship, with 107 points and 22 assists, in 9 games. In 2013, Diaw and the French team won the gold medal at the EuroBasket tournament. The following year, he led the national team without its star Tony Parker to the bronze medal in the 2014 FIBA World Cup.

=== International statistics ===
Tournament	Games played	Points per game	Rebounds per game	Assists per game
2003 EuroBasket	6	4.7	4.5	0.7
2005 EuroBasket	7	13.7	5.3	3.4
2006 FIBA World Championship	9	11.9	6.0	2.4
2007 EuroBasket	9	9.3	5.8	1.2
2009 EuroBasket	8	7.5	4.2	3.8
2010 FIBA World Championship	6	8.5	5.7	3.7
2011 EuroBasket	11	8.0	4.7	2.5
2012 Olympics	6	7.7	6.0	4.3
2013 EuroBasket	11	10.4	4.6	3.4
2014 FIBA World Cup	9	9.2	4.6	4.0
2015 EuroBasket	9	6.2	3.0	4.0
2016 FIBA Olympic Qualifying Tournament	4	8.0	6.0	3.2
2016 Summer Olympics	6	8.3	4.2	4.7
2017 EuroBasket	6	9.2	5.7	3.5

== Player profile ==
At 6 ft 8 in (2.03 m) and 250 lb (110 kg), Diaw was a natural forward. However, his passing skills and ability to score inside earned him a reputation for being capable of playing all positions well. Diaw began the 2005–06 season as a reserve, substituted at point guard when starting point guard Steve Nash was injured, started at small forward, and was finally moved to center when all three Suns centers were injured. Diaw's breakout season (13.3 points, 6.9 rebounds and 6.2 assists per game) was recognized with the Most Improved Player Award. Diaw was lauded for his unselfish but assertive play.^{,}

While somewhat overshadowed by the Spurs 'Big Three' of Duncan, Parker and Ginobili, Diaw played a crucial role in the team's success. His excellent passing and playmaking abilities made him a prototype of what came to be known as the point forward position, exhibited by players such as Luka Dončić and to a lesser degree by LeBron James and Nikola Jokić. Diaw was also an efficient post scorer and athletic scorer, capable of going coast-to-coast before either finding a teammate or finishing at the rim. In addition, his ability to play multiple positions made him a precursor to the current era of small ball teams and positionless basketball.

== Executive career ==
In 2009, Diaw became vice-president and shareholder of the JSA Bordeaux basketball club in his native France and took over as president one year later. In 2017, he stepped down as president of the club.

In 2010, he founded UKIND, an eco-responsible clothing brand.

On July 4, 2019, Diaw was announced as the new president of Metropolitans 92, succeeding Jean-Pierre Aubry. He resigned in April 2020.

== Personal life ==
Diaw's 6 ft 2 in (1.88 m) mother, Élisabeth Riffiod, is regarded as one of the best centers in French women's basketball history. She is a member of the French Basketball Hall of Fame. Diaw's father, Issa Diaw, is a former Senegalese high jump champion. Diaw has a half-brother, Paco Diaw, who was a guard at Georgia Tech, but transferred to Lee University, a small NAIA school in the Southern States Athletic Conference. His other brother, Martin Diaw, played basketball for Division II's California University of Pennsylvania.

Boris Diaw and Tony Parker are long-time friends who met at the French national training institute INSEP as teenagers, roomed together early in their careers, and later played together for the San Antonio Spurs. Diaw attended and served as a groomsman man at Parker's wedding to actress Eva Longoria in Paris in 2007. .

In 2005, Diaw established a non-profit foundation, Babac'Ards, to organize sports activities for Senegalese youth and aid "developmental education".

Diaw is known to have a passion for photography, sailing, and wine tasting.

== See also ==
- List of European basketball players in the United States
