= Jean Cottard =

French fencer (1926–2020)

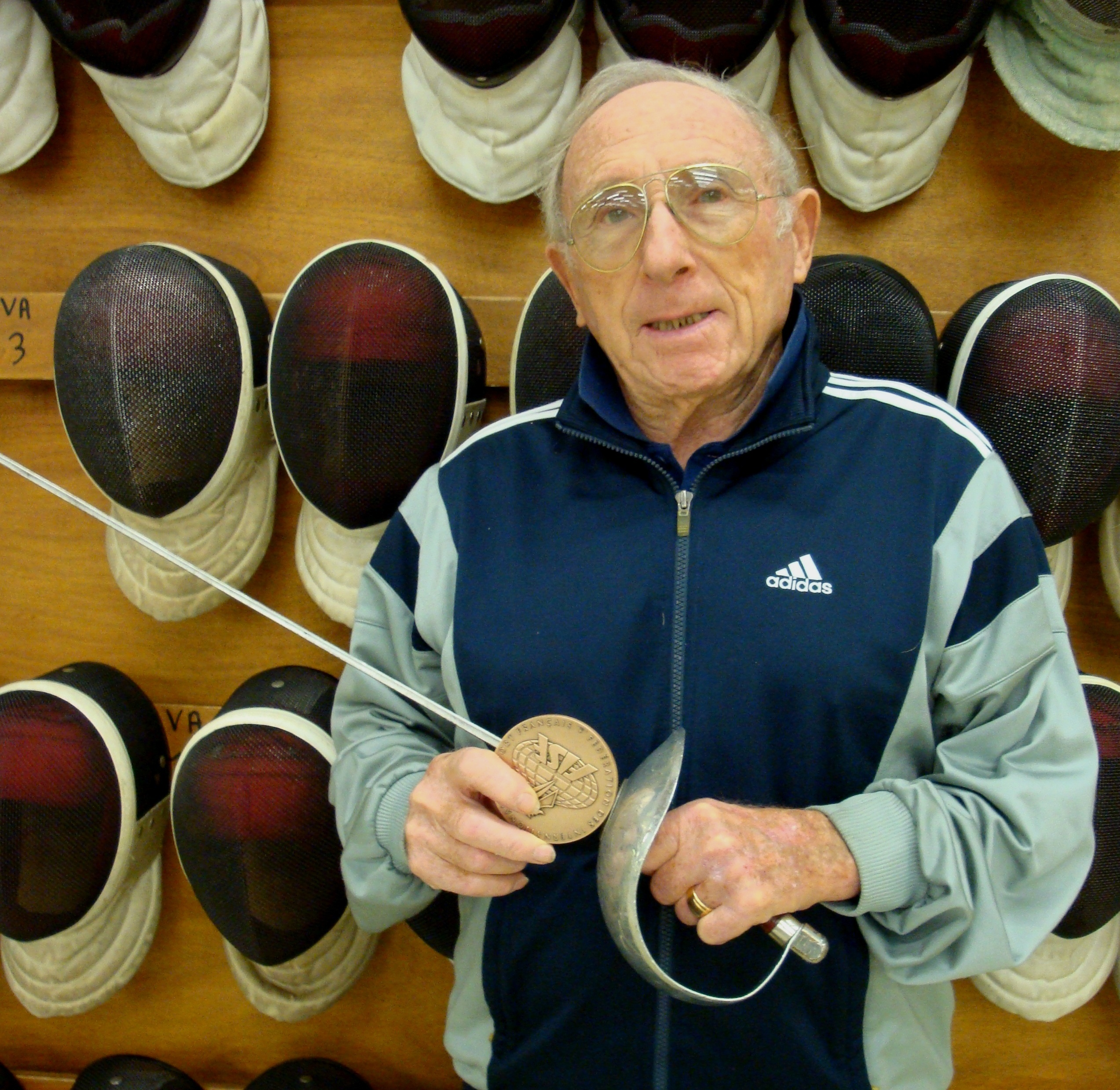
- Cottard in 2012

Personal information
- Born: 14 July 1926 Paris, France
- Died: 1 December 2020 (aged 94) Antibes, France

Fencing career
- Sport: Fencing
- Country: France

Jean Cottard (14 July 1926 – 1 December 2020) was a French foil fencer. He earned his Master of Arms at Fort Carré in 1949. The coach of Christian d'Oriola, he became the first National Technical Director of France in 1964. He served as a member of the French Federation of Fencing from 1988 until his death.

== Biography ==
Born in Paris in 1926, Cottard grew up playing basketball, table tennis, and track. He practiced athletics with Gilbert Omnès and boxing with Roger Sauvignac. He performed his military service in French Tunisia in 1945 at the end of World War II, where an uncle taught him fencing. He entered Fort Carré in 1946 and became a fencing master three years later. He began teaching at Cambridge University in 1952 and at Racing Club de France from 1953 to 1972.

Cottard was the French military champion of fencing in 1951 and won the French fencing championship in 1951, 1954, 1958, and 1960. He then coached the French National Fencing Team from 1956 to 1972, leading the team to 12 gold, 13 silver, and 23 bronze medals at various Olympic Games and World Fencing Championships. He was constantly reelected to the French Fencing Federation from 1988 until his death and helped collaborate with the French Federation of Adapted Sport.

Jean Cottard died in Antibes on 1 December 2020 at the age of 94.

== Decorations ==
- Officer of the Ordre national du Mérite (1974)
- Officer of the Legion of Honour (1993)
- Gold Medal for Youth Sports and Associative Engagement
- Gold Medal of the National Federation of Joinvillais
- Gloire du sport (2012)
