= Kemba Walker =

American basketball player (born 1990)

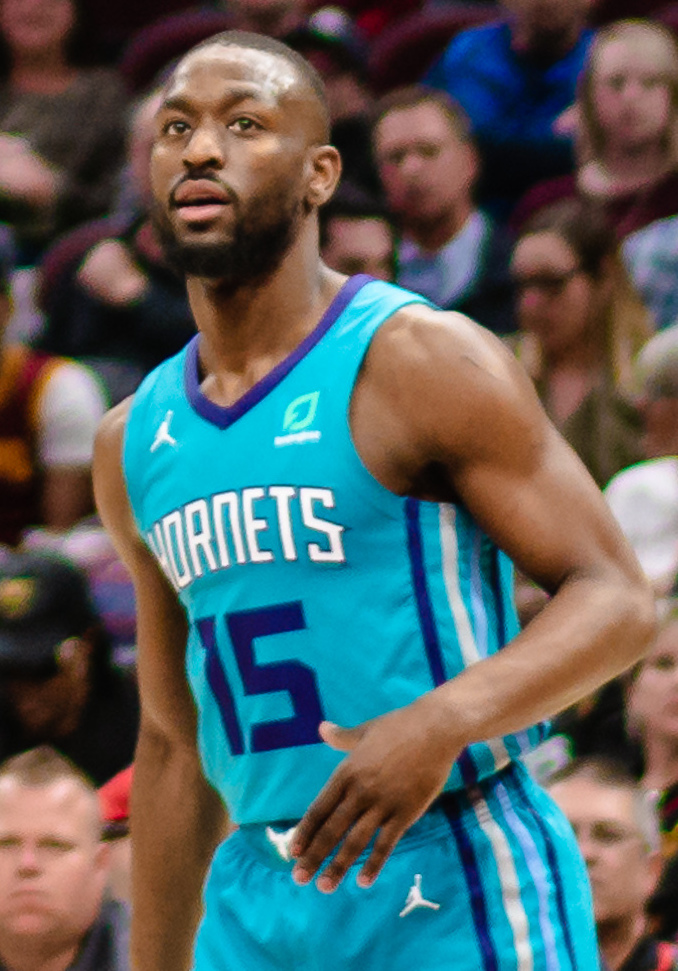
- Walker with the Charlotte Hornets in 2019

Charlotte Hornets
- Title: Assistant coach
- League: NBA

Personal information
- Born: May 8, 1990 (age 36) The Bronx, New York, U.S.
- Listed height: 6 ft 1 in (1.85 m)
- Listed weight: 184 lb (83 kg)

Career information
- High school: Rice (Manhattan, New York)
- College: UConn (2008–2011)
- NBA draft: 2011: 1st round, 9th overall pick
- Drafted by: Charlotte Bobcats
- Playing career: 2011–2024
- Position: Point guard
- Number: 1, 15, 8, 34
- Coaching career: 2024–present

Career history

Playing
- 2011–2019: Charlotte Bobcats / Hornets
- 2019–2021: Boston Celtics
- 2021–2022: New York Knicks
- 2022–2023: Dallas Mavericks
- 2023–2024: AS Monaco

Coaching
- 2024–2026: Charlotte Hornets (player enhancement)
- 2026–present: Charlotte Hornets (assistant)

Career highlights
- As player: 4× NBA All-Star (2017–2020); All-NBA Third Team (2019); NCAA champion (2011); NCAA Final Four Most Outstanding Player (2011); Consensus First-team All-American (2011); Lute Olson Award (2011); Bob Cousy Award (2011); First-team All-Big East (2011); Third-team All-Big East (2010); Big East tournament MVP (2011); Second-team Parade All-American (2008); McDonald's All-American (2008)

Career NBA statistics
- Points: 14,486 (19.3 ppg)
- Rebounds: 2,831 (3.8 rpg)
- Assists: 3,938 (5.3 apg)
- Stats at NBA.com
- Stats at Basketball Reference
Medals
Men's basketball
Representing United States
FIBA Americas U-18 Championship
| Silver medal – second place | 2008 Formosa | Team |

Kemba Hudley Walker (born May 8, 1990) is an American professional basketball coach and former player who is an assistant coach for the Charlotte Hornets of the National Basketball Association (NBA). He was picked ninth overall by the Charlotte Bobcats in the 2011 NBA draft and also played for the Boston Celtics, New York Knicks, and the Dallas Mavericks, before finishing his career with AS Monaco. He played college basketball for the Connecticut Huskies. In their 2010–11 season, Walker was the nation's second-leading scorer and was named consensus first-team All-American; he also led the Huskies to a 2011 NCAA championship victory and claimed the tournament's Most Outstanding Player award. Walker is a four-time NBA All-Star, a one-time All-NBA Team member, two-time winner of the NBA Sportsmanship Award, as well as a LNB Élite champion.

== High school career ==
Walker attended Rice High School in Harlem, New York City. During his junior year, Walker played once at Madison Square Garden against Simeon Career Academy and senior guard Derrick Rose in a 53–51 victory. Over his senior year, he posted 18.2 points and 5.3 assists per game, earning him a spot on the prestigious McDonald's All-American Team. He was able to play in the elite New York City Gauchos, the premier AAU basketball program for youth, and was joined by fellow Big East Conference talents-to-be Jordan Theodore, Darryl Bryant, Liam Herman, and Liam Arazi. Walker's team finished No. 1 in the nation.

Considered a five-star recruit by Rivals.com, Walker was listed as the No. 5 point guard and the No. 14 player in the nation in 2008.

== College career ==
=== Freshman year ===
During his freshman year at the University of Connecticut, Walker played in every contest and was named to the Big East All-Rookie Team. He helped the Huskies achieve a number one seed in the 2009 NCAA tournament. Despite starting in only two games, he averaged 25.5 minutes per contest, far more than any regular non-starter. He also helped the Huskies advance to the 2009 Final Four with a 23-point effort in the Elite Eight versus Missouri.

=== Sophomore year ===
During the Huskies' 2009–2010 season, Walker started in all 34 of their games and contributed an average of 14.6 points. He also led the team in scoring for the eighth time in the last nine games of the season, with 18 points at Virginia Tech. Walker was named by the U.S. Basketball Writers Association (USBWA) to the First Team All-District. Connecticut clinched a 4-seed in the NCAA's 2010 National Invitation Tournament only to fall short to Virginia Tech and finish the relatively disappointing season going 18–16 (7–11) in conference play.

=== Junior year ===
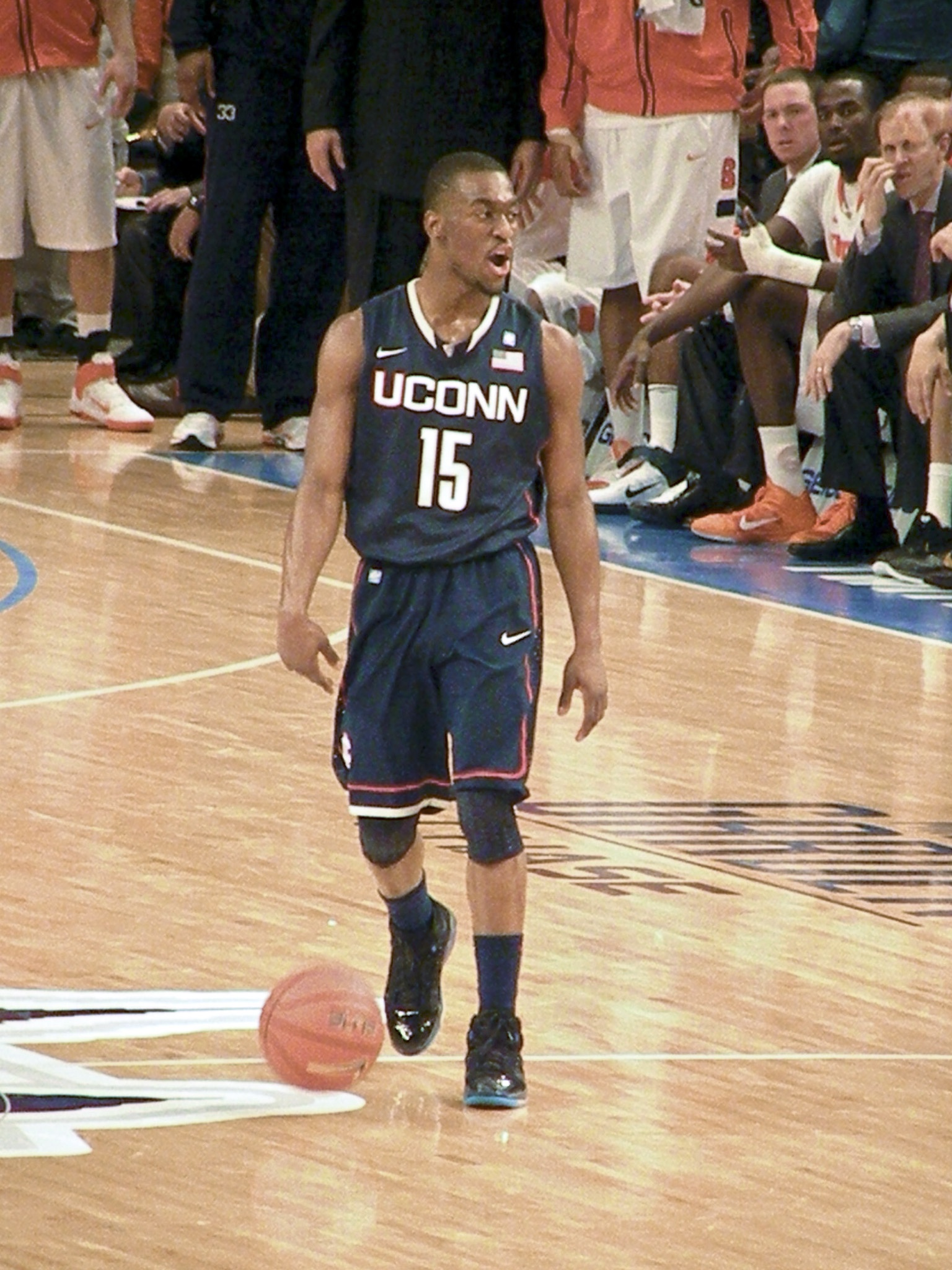
Walker with Connecticut in 2011

Walker rose to national prominence in his third year at Connecticut. This was because, twelve games into his junior campaign, he distinguished himself as the leading scorer in the nation, posting 26.7 points per contest; in addition, Walker averaged 5 rebounds and 3.8 assists. It was then that he appeared on one of the six regional covers of Sports Illustrated magazine.

In the 2011 Big East tournament, Walker hit the game-clinching shot at the buzzer to beat Brad Wannamaker and the Pittsburgh Panthers, ranked No. 3 overall, thereby advancing the Huskies to the semifinals. Walker led UConn to victory in the ensuing Big East Championship against the Louisville Cardinals and earned tournament MVP honors in the process. Over five games in as many days, Walker tallied an unprecedented 130 points, a record of points scored for not only the Big East but for any conference tournament in the past 15 seasons. UConn thus became the first school to win five games in five days and earn a conference championship.

On March 14, 2011, the U.S. Basketball Writers Association named Walker First Team All-American with only Fox Sports picking him to the Second Team. His heroic performance in the 2010–11 season also made him a finalist for the Association's college player of the year honors, the Oscar Robertson Trophy. Despite finishing second to national sensation Jimmer Fredette for this award, at least several journalists held that it was rather Walker who deserved the distinction of best player that year. Among other accolades bestowed on him, Walker claimed the Bob Cousy Award for college basketball's top point guard in the nation. On April 4, 2011, Walker, with 16 points himself, rallied and led the University of Connecticut to win the Division I Championship, while he won the honor of NCAA basketball tournament Most Outstanding Player. Upon the team's return from Houston, at a pep rally to celebrate the National Title, Walker was added to the Huskies of Honor. He became the first men's basketball player to receive the distinction since the inaugural class was announced in December 2006.

== Professional career ==
=== Charlotte Bobcats/Hornets (2011–2019) ===
==== 2011–12 season: Rookie season ====
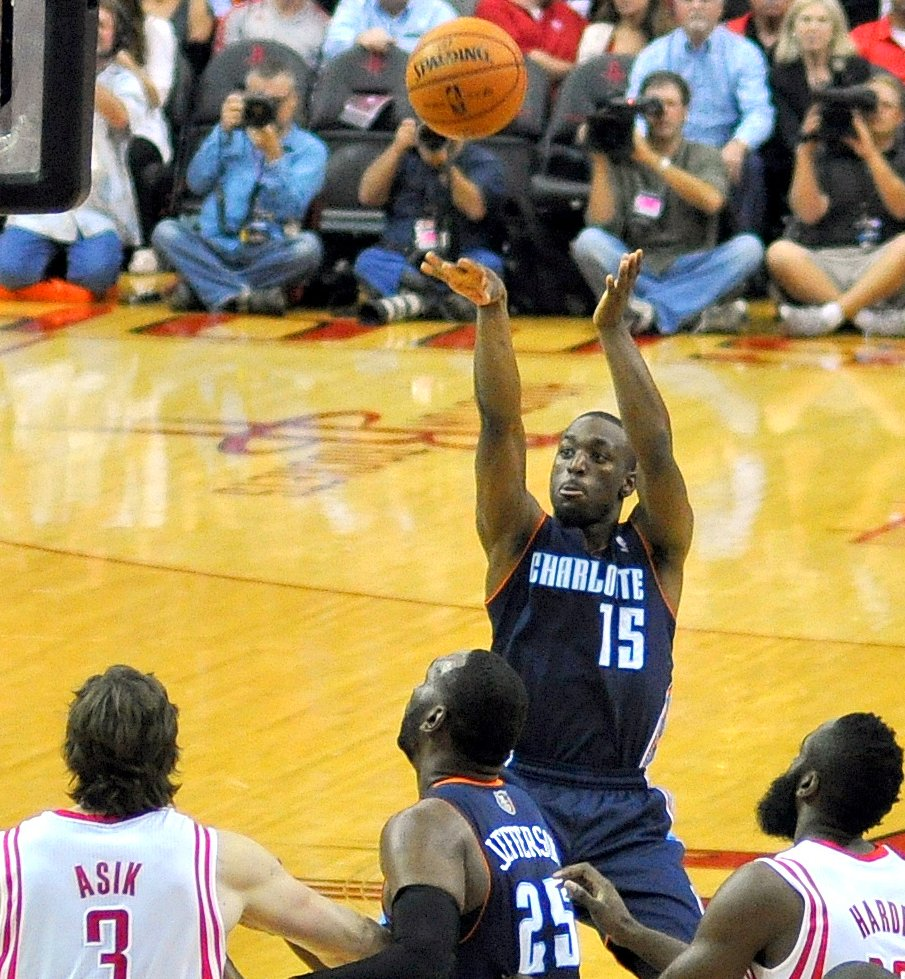
Walker shoots during a game against the Houston Rockets, October 2013

Walker graduated from UConn in three years. Accordingly, he entered the 2011 NBA draft and was selected ninth overall by the Charlotte Bobcats. Walker signed a multi-year shoe deal with Under Armour, the first rookie from the 2011 draft class to do so.

On December 11, 2011, he signed the rookie scale contract with the Bobcats, and with the injury of point guard D. J. Augustin, he became their starting point guard for the lockout-shortened season. Walker participated in the 2012 Rising Stars Challenge during All-Star Weekend. However, the Charlotte Bobcats only managed to go 7–59 in the lockout season.

==== 2012–13 season: Sophomore season ====
On November 14, 2012, Walker hit the first game-winner of his NBA career against the Minnesota Timberwolves. He finished the game with 22 points on 9-of-19 shooting, as well as 5 rebounds, 4 assists and 4 steals. On January 21, 2013, he scored a then career-high 35 points against the Houston Rockets. During the 2012–13 season, Walker was selected with teammate Michael Kidd-Gilchrist to the 2013 Rising Stars Challenge in which they both scored 8 points.

Kemba finished the 2012–13 season with averages of 17.7 points, 5.8 assists, 3.5 rebounds, and 2 steals per contest. He took significant strides over his rookie year.

==== 2013–14 season: First playoff appearance ====
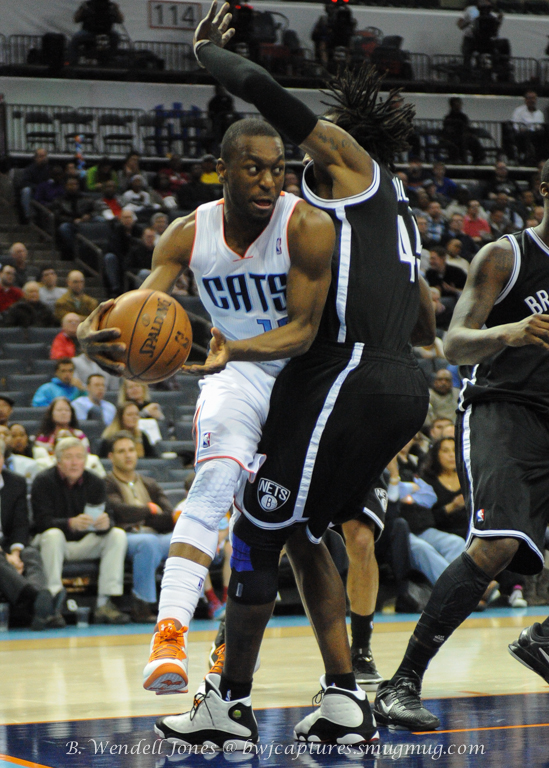
Walker defended by Gerald Wallace in 2013

On December 18, 2013, Walker hit a buzzer-beating jump shot over Jonas Valančiūnas in overtime to beat the Toronto Raptors. He finished the night with 26 points and 5 rebounds on 10/18 shooting from the field. On February 19, 2014, Walker recorded 23 points, 5 rebounds and a career-high 16 assists in a 116–98 win over the Detroit Pistons. Five days later, he was awarded the Eastern Conference Player of the Week, having averaged 22.5 points, 8.8 assists, and 5.5 rebounds in the span of seven days. In a home victory over the Orlando Magic on April 4, 2014, Walker recorded his second career triple-double with 13 points, 10 assists, and 10 rebounds.

Playing against the Miami Heat in the first round of the Eastern Conference Playoffs and with teammate Al Jefferson unable to play due to a Plantar fasciitis injury, Walker had an exceptional game four: he finished the game with a playoff franchise-high 29 points, along with 5 assists, 5 rebounds, 3 blocks, and 2 steals. The effort came in a loss as the Heat completed a four-game sweep of the Bobcats.

==== 2014–15 season: Knee surgery ====
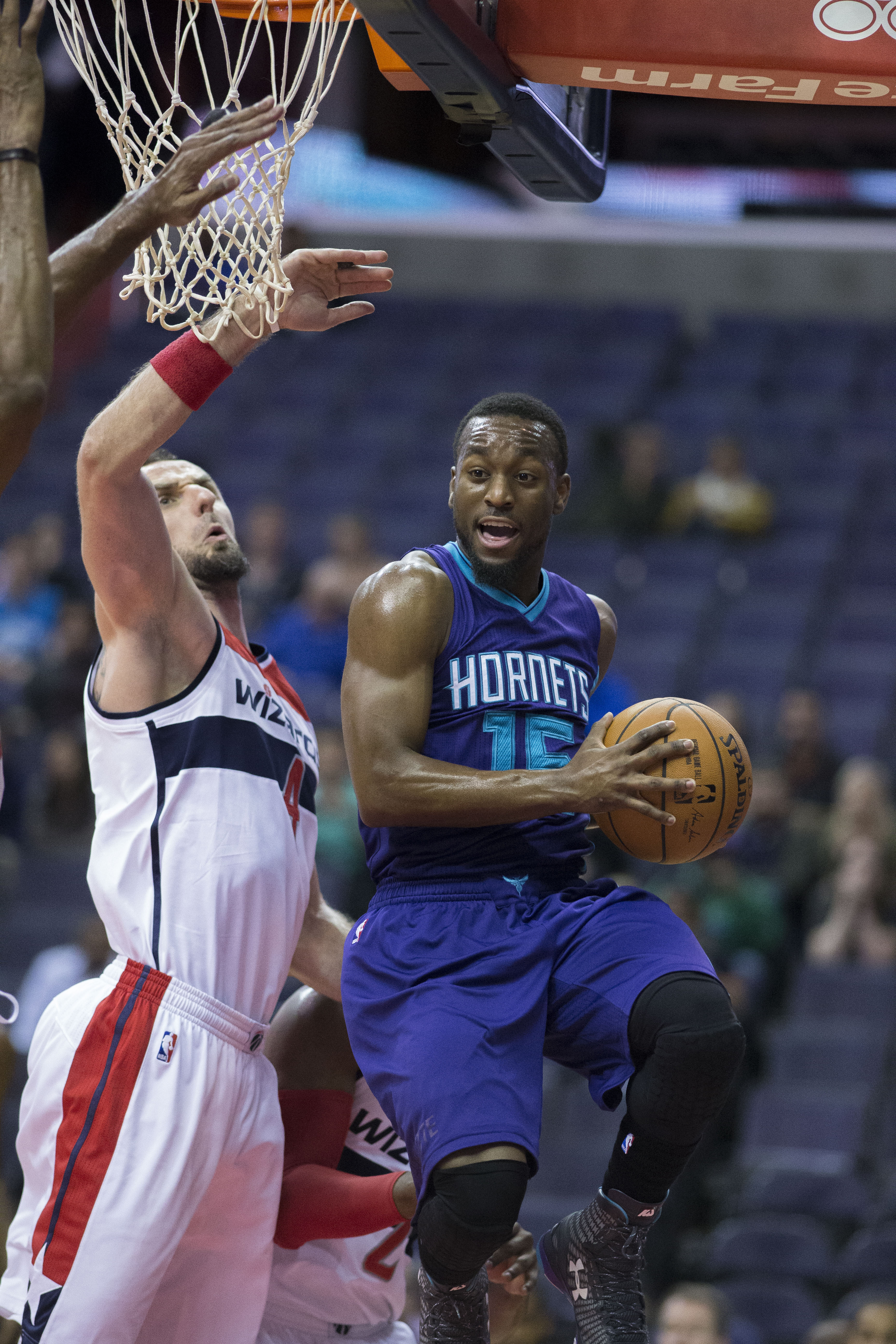
Walker with the Hornets in October 2014

In the newly renamed Charlotte Hornets' opening game against the Milwaukee Bucks on October 29, Walker led an impressive comeback in an overtime 108–106 victory. The Hornets had been 24 points down by the fourth quarter when they staged a comeback; Walker scored a three-pointer with 1.6 seconds left to force overtime and later hit the shot that clinched the game as well. He finished with 26 points, 5 assists, and 6 rebounds. The following day, he signed a four-year, $48 million contract extension with the Hornets. On December 5, 2014, Walker hit his second game-winner of the season in a 103–102 win over the New York Knicks. On December 27, in a 94–102 loss to the Orlando Magic, he scored a then career-high 42 points and set a Charlotte Hornets franchise record for most points scored in a half with his 35 points that he posted in the second. On January 3, against the Orlando Magic, Walker scored 30 points to pass Kendall Gill for 10th place on the Charlotte Hornets all-time scoring list with 4,160 points. In three back-to-back games played between the January 3 and 7, Walker scored 30, 33, and 31 points in victories over the Orlando Magic, the Boston Celtics, and the New Orleans Pelicans respectively; he thereby joined Larry Johnson, Glen Rice, and Kelly Tripucka as one of four players in Charlotte Hornets' franchise history to have three or more consecutive games of scoring 30-plus points. Walker also hit his fifth game-winner of his career and his third of the season on January 7 in the 98–94 victory over the Pelicans. On January 12, he was named the Eastern Conference Player of the Week for games played Monday, January 5, through Sunday, January 11. Over the week, he led the Hornets to a 4–0 record and averaged 30.3 points, 5.8 rebounds, and 4.5 assists in 36.2 minutes, while shooting .500 from the field (44–88), .364 from beyond the three-point line (8–22) and .893 from the free-throw line (25–28).

On January 28, 2015, Walker was ruled out for six weeks after he underwent successful surgery to repair a torn lateral meniscus in his left knee. He returned to action on March 11, after missing 18 games, to score six points in 16 minutes off the bench as the Hornets lost to the Sacramento Kings 106–113.

==== 2015–16 season: Breakthrough ====
On November 23, 2015, Walker scored a then season-high 39 points in a 127–122 overtime win over the Sacramento Kings. On January 18, 2016, Walker set a career-high and a franchise-record with 52 points in a 124–119 double overtime win over the Utah Jazz. He made 16-of-34 from the field, including 6-of-11 three-pointers, and was 14-of-15 from the free throw line, breaking the team mark of 48 points set by Glen Rice in March 1997. On March 9, in a win over the New Orleans Pelicans, Walker became just the third Hornets player to make 500 career three-pointers, joining Dell Curry (929) and Glen Rice (508). Five days later, he earned his fourth career Player of the Week award, and second of the 2015–16 season (first coming on January 25), becoming just the sixth Charlotte player to win the award multiple times in the same season. The Hornets finished the regular season as the sixth seed in the Eastern Conference with a 48–34 record. In the first round of the playoffs, the Hornets faced the third-seeded Miami Heat, and in a Game 4 win on April 25, Walker scored a playoff career-high 34 points, helping the Hornets tie the series at 2–2. He topped that mark in Game 6 of the series, scoring 37 points in a 97–90 loss, as the Heat tied the series at 3–3. The Hornets went on to lose Game 7, bowing out of the playoffs with a 4–3 defeat.

In May 2016, Walker again underwent surgery on a torn meniscus in his left knee.

==== 2016–17 season: First All-Star selection ====
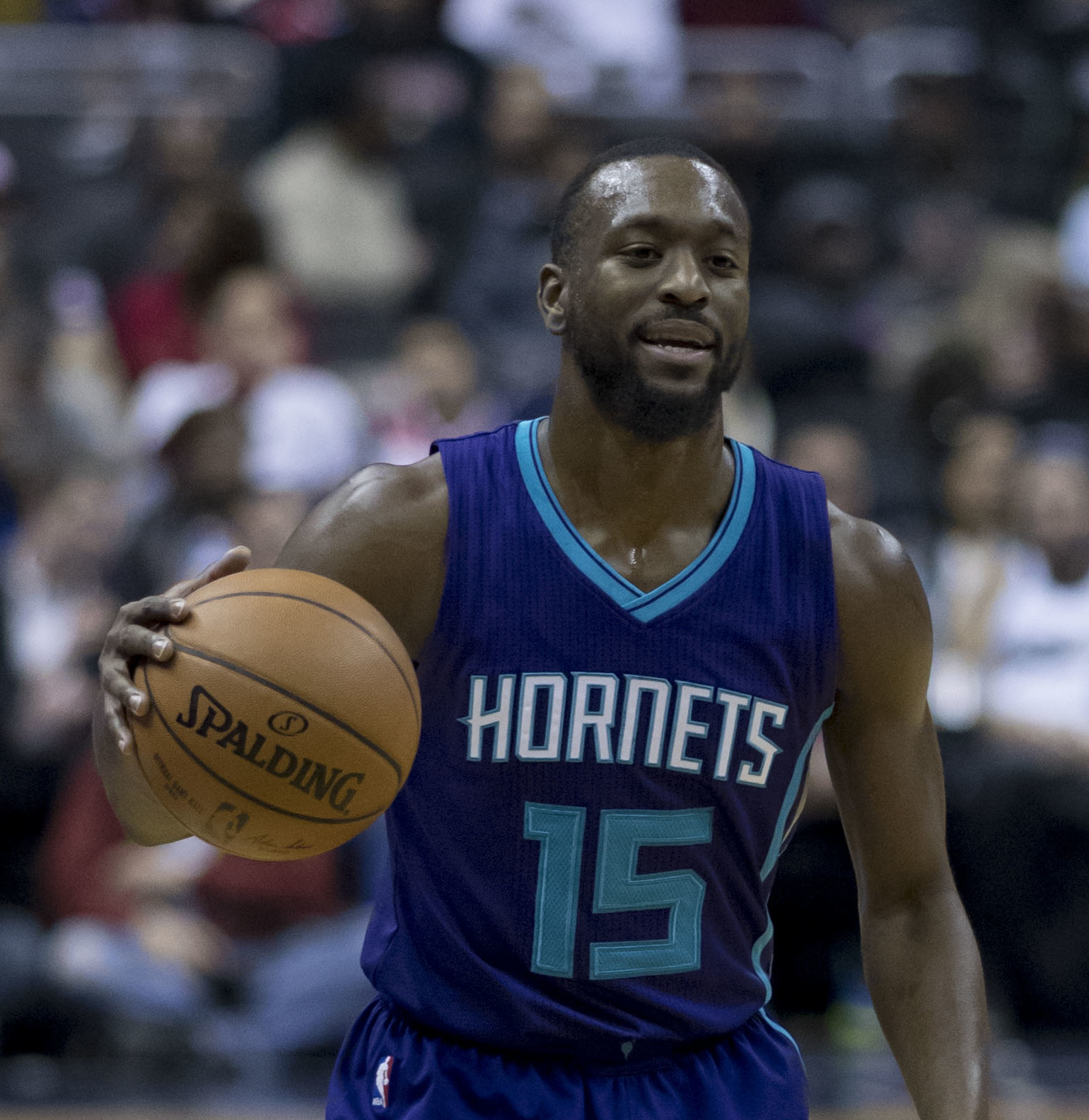
Walker in 2016

On November 4, 2016, Walker scored a season-high 30 points in a 99–95 win over the Brooklyn Nets, helping Charlotte improve to 4–1 for the first time since 2000. He topped that mark on November 11, recording 40 points, 10 rebounds and six assists in a 113–111 loss to the Toronto Raptors. On December 29, with 22 points against the Miami Heat, Walker recorded his 7,000th point with the Charlotte franchise when he hit a three-pointer with 4:16 left in the first quarter. He became the fourth player in franchise history to reach that mark, and became the second-quickest by doing so in his 396th game—Larry Johnson passed the mark in his 355th career game with the Hornets. On January 2, 2017, Walker recorded 34 points and a season-high 11 rebounds in a 118–111 loss to the Chicago Bulls. On January 26, he was named an Eastern Conference All-Star reserve for the 2017 NBA All-Star Game. Two days later, in a loss to the Sacramento Kings, Walker moved into third place in franchise history in field goals made (2,586), passing Gerald Wallace. On January 31, he scored 22 points against the Portland Trail Blazers and moved into third place on the team's career scoring list. On March 6, he was named Eastern Conference Player of the Week for games played Monday, February 27 through Sunday, March 5. On March 31, 2017, he scored a game-high 31 points in a 122–114 win over the Denver Nuggets. During the game, Walker became the second player in team history to reach 8,000 career points—the only other player to reach that mark is Dell Curry (9,839).

In May 2017, Walker underwent an arthroscopic procedure on his left knee.

==== 2017–18 season: 2nd Sportsmanship Award ====
On December 4, Walker scored 29 points and made all 14 free throw attempts (tying a career-high) in a 104–94 win over the Orlando Magic, becoming the first player in franchise history with 200 career 20-point games. On January 10, 2018, he had 41 points on 16-of-28 shooting in a 115–111 loss to the Dallas Mavericks. On January 15, he scored 20 points in a 118–107 win over the Detroit Pistons, thus reaching 9,000 career points. On January 24, in a 101–96 loss to the New Orleans Pelicans, Walker became only the second Hornets' player with 900 career 3-pointers, joining Dell Curry (929). On January 31, he set franchise and career-highs with nine 3-pointers and scored 38 points in a 123–110 win over the Atlanta Hawks. On February 4, in a 115–110 win over the Phoenix Suns, Walker scored 18 points and broke the franchise career record for 3-pointers with 930, surpassing the record of 929 held by Dell Curry. On February 8, Walker was named as the replacement for the injured Kristaps Porziņģis in the 2018 NBA All-Star Game, marking his second consecutive All-Star selection. On March 22, Walker scored 46 points with 10 3-pointers in a 140–79 win over the Memphis Grizzlies. It was his ninth 40-point game of his career and third-highest scoring game of his career, as he helped the Hornets record the sixth-largest win in NBA history. On March 28, he scored 21 points in a 118–105 loss to the Cleveland Cavaliers, surpassing Dell Curry (9,839 points) to become the franchise's career scoring leader. Walker also established a new team record with his 44th consecutive made free throw. That free throw also brought his career total to 1,999, which broke Gerald Wallace's franchise record of 1,998.

==== 2018–19 season: All-NBA selection and final season with the Hornets ====
On October 17, 2018, Walker scored 41 points in a 113–112 loss to the Milwaukee Bucks, setting a franchise record for points scored in a season opener. It was his 10th 40-point game of his career, tying Glen Rice for the franchise record for 40-point games. Three days later, he scored 39 points, including the game-winning free throw with a half-second left, to lift the Hornets to a 113–112 win over the Miami Heat. During the game, he eclipsed the career 10,000-point mark. Walker set the NBA record for most three-point field goals through the first three games of a season with 19 (previously held by Danilo Gallinari with 18 in 2009–10) and became the first player in NBA history to make five or more three-point field goals in each of the first three games of a season. He was subsequently named Eastern Conference Player of the Week for the first week of the season. On November 17, he scored a career-high and franchise-best 60 points in a 122–119 overtime loss to the Philadelphia 76ers. On December 5 against the Minnesota Timberwolves, Walker made his 502nd career start for Charlotte, the most of any player in team history, passing Muggsy Bogues (501).

On January 24, Walker was named a starter for the Eastern Conference in the 2019 NBA All-Star Game, joining Glen Rice as the only players to represent Charlotte in three All-Star Games. Walker also became the third Hornets player to start an All-Star Game, along with Larry Johnson (1993) and Eddie Jones (2000). On February 6, he had 30 points and a season-high 11 rebounds in a 99–93 loss to the Dallas Mavericks. On February 9, he hit a season-high nine 3-pointers and scored 37 points in a 129–120 win over the Atlanta Hawks. With 32 points, seven assists and three rebounds against the New Orleans Pelicans on April 3, Walker recorded his 26th 30-point game of the season, passing Glen Rice for the franchise record for 30-point games in a season. He also set the franchise record for 3-pointers made in a season when he made his 244th 3-pointer against New Orleans. On April 5, he scored 29 points in a 113–111 win over the Toronto Raptors, thus joining Glen Rice as the only players in franchise history to score 2,000 points in a season—Rice scored 2,115 points in the 1996–97 season. With his 250th made 3-pointer on April 7 against the Detroit Pistons, Walker became only the ninth different player in NBA history to connect on 250+ 3-pointers in a season. He was subsequently named Eastern Conference Player of the Week for games played April 1–7, marking his seventh career player of the week award. Following the season, he was named to the All-NBA Third Team, his first all-league selection.

=== Boston Celtics (2019–2021) ===
Coming off a frustrating 2018–19 season, the Boston Celtics would go on to lose franchise centerpieces Kyrie Irving and Al Horford to free agency, opening the door to start a new chapter with a new max-salary player. After Walker and the Celtics showed mutual interest at the start of free agency, he officially joined the franchise on July 6, 2019, through a sign and trade deal with Charlotte worth $141 million over four years. Walker chose to wear Kobe Bryant’s number 8 with the Celtics as his usual number 15 had been retired by the Celtics in honor of Tom Heinsohn.

Walker made his Celtics debut on October 23, 2019, against the Philadelphia 76ers; he put up 12 points on 18 shot attempts from the field in 34 minutes of play during the 107–93 loss. On November 22, during a game against the Nuggets, Walker went down with a neck injury after colliding with teammate Semi Ojeleye. He was taken off the court on a stretcher. He was first diagnosed with concussion-like symptoms, and then later diagnosed with a sprained neck. On November 27, Walker scored a then season-high 39 points in a 121–110 win over the Brooklyn Nets. That season-high would be eclipsed on December 11, when Walker scored 44 points in 122–117 loss to the Indiana Pacers. On January 16, 2020, Walker would post a 40-point, 11 assist double-double in a 128–123 loss to the Milwaukee Bucks.

On January 20, Walker recorded his first head-to-head win against LeBron James, after having begun his career 0–28 against him. Posting 20 points, seven assists, four rebounds, and a steal, he helped the Celtics come away with a 139–107 blowout victory over longtime rivals the Lakers. Three days later, Walker was named to his fourth consecutive All-Star Game, being selected as an Eastern Conference starter.

The 2019–2020 season was suspended due to the COVID-19 pandemic. After the season resumed, Walker helped the Celtics reach the Eastern Conference Finals, where the team was defeated by the Miami Heat. Walker missed several games during the season due to knee soreness.

In December 2020, the Celtics confirmed that Walker had received a stem cell injection in his left knee in October and had been placed on 12 week strengthening program, sidelining him for the start of the 2020–21 NBA season. Walker made his season debut on January 17, 2021.

In the 2021 playoffs, Walker missed games four and five of Boston's first-round playoff series against the Brooklyn Nets due to a bone bruise in his left knee. The Celtics lost the series in five games.

=== New York Knicks (2021–2022) ===
On June 18, 2021, Walker was traded to the Oklahoma City Thunder, along with a 2021 first-round draft pick (16th selection), and a 2025 second round draft pick from the Boston Celtics in exchange for Al Horford, Moses Brown, and a 2023 second-round draft pick. Walker reached a contract buyout agreement with the Thunder on August 6, 2021.

On August 11, he signed a two-year, $17.9 million contract with the New York Knicks, his hometown team. On October 20, Walker made his Knicks debut, recording 10 points and eight assists in a 138–134 double overtime victory over the Boston Celtics. On November 29, 2021, Walker was removed from the Knicks' rotation in favor of Alec Burks. He sat for 10 games before re-entering the rotation on December 18 after guard Derrick Rose was injured. On December 23, Walker scored a season-high 44 points, alongside nine rebounds and eight assists, in a 124–117 loss to the Washington Wizards. On December 25, in the Knicks' 101–87 win against the Atlanta Hawks, Walker recorded a triple-double with 10 points, 10 rebounds and 12 assists and became the seventh player in NBA history to record a triple-double in an NBA Christmas Day game.

Walker missed games in January 2022 due to knee problems. In February 2022, the Knicks and Walker reached an agreement that he would be sidelined for the remainder of the season.

=== Dallas Mavericks (2022–2023) ===
On July 6, 2022, Walker and the draft rights to Jalen Duren were traded to the Detroit Pistons in exchange for a future first-round selection. On October 17, Walker reached a contract buyout agreement with the Pistons.

On November 28, 2022, Walker signed with the Dallas Mavericks, on a one-year, non-guaranteed deal. On December 17, Walker put up a season-high 32 points, five rebounds, and seven assists in a 100–99 overtime loss to the Cleveland Cavaliers. On January 6, 2023, Walker was waived by the Mavericks.

=== AS Monaco (2023–2024) ===
On July 21, 2023, Walker signed with LNB Pro A and EuroLeague club AS Monaco, moving outside of the United States for the first time in his career. On October 18, Walker made his debut for Monaco, scoring 2 points in ten minutes of play in a EuroLeague home win over Crvena zvezda. He only played in the EuroLeague during the season, averaging 4.4 points in 26 games.

On July 2, 2024, Walker announced his retirement from professional basketball.

== Coaching career ==
=== Charlotte Hornets (2024–present) ===
On July 3, 2024, Walker was hired by the Charlotte Hornets, joining Charles Lee's staff as a player enhancement coach. He later became an assistant coach for the Hornets.

== Career statistics ==
Legend
| GP | Games played | GS | Games started | MPG | Minutes per game |
| FG% | Field-goal percentage | 3P% | 3-point field-goal percentage | FT% | Free-throw percentage |
| RPG | Rebounds per game | APG | Assists per game | SPG | Steals per game |
| BPG | Blocks per game | PPG | Points per game | PIR | Performance index rating |
| **Bold** | Career high |

=== NBA ===
| * | Led the league |

==== Regular season ====
| Year | Team | GP | GS | MPG | FG% | 3P% | FT% | RPG | APG | SPG | BPG | PPG |
|---|---|---|---|---|---|---|---|---|---|---|---|---|
| 2011–12 | Charlotte | 66* | 25 | 27.2 | .366 | .305 | .789 | 3.5 | 4.4 | .9 | .3 | 12.1 |
| 2012–13 | Charlotte | **82*** | **82*** | 34.9 | .423 | .322 | .798 | 3.5 | 5.7 | **2.0** | .4 | 17.7 |
| 2013–14 | Charlotte | 73 | 73 | **35.8** | .393 | .333 | .837 | 4.2 | **6.1** | 1.2 | .4 | 17.7 |
| 2014–15 | Charlotte | 62 | 58 | 34.2 | .385 | .304 | .827 | 3.5 | 5.1 | 1.4 | **.5** | 17.3 |
| 2015–16 | Charlotte | 81 | 81 | 35.6 | .427 | .371 | .847 | **4.4** | 5.2 | 1.6 | **.5** | 20.9 |
| 2016–17 | Charlotte | 79 | 79 | 34.7 | **.443** | **.399** | .847 | 3.9 | 5.5 | 1.1 | .3 | 23.2 |
| 2017–18 | Charlotte | 80 | 80 | 34.2 | .431 | .384 | .864 | 3.1 | 5.6 | 1.1 | .3 | 22.1 |
| 2018–19 | Charlotte | **82*** | **82*** | 34.9 | .434 | .356 | .844 | **4.4** | 5.9 | 1.2 | .4 | **25.6** |
| 2019–20 | Boston | 56 | 56 | 31.1 | .425 | .381 | .864 | 3.9 | 4.8 | .9 | **.5** | 20.4 |
| 2020–21 | Boston | 43 | 43 | 31.8 | .420 | .360 | **.899** | 4.0 | 4.9 | 1.1 | .3 | 19.3 |
| 2021–22 | New York | 37 | 37 | 25.6 | .403 | .367 | .845 | 3.0 | 3.5 | .7 | .2 | 11.6 |
| 2022–23 | Dallas | 9 | 1 | 16.0 | .421 | .250 | .810 | 1.8 | 2.1 | .2 | .2 | 8.0 |
| Career | | 750 | 697 | 33.1 | .418 | .360 | .840 | 3.8 | 5.3 | 1.2 | .4 | 19.3 |
| All-Star | | 4 | 2 | 21.0 | .452 | .280 | — | 2.3 | 4.5 | .8 | .0 | 11.3 |

==== Playoffs ====
| Year | Team | GP | GS | MPG | FG% | 3P% | FT% | RPG | APG | SPG | BPG | PPG |
|---|---|---|---|---|---|---|---|---|---|---|---|---|
| 2014 | Charlotte | 4 | 4 | **38.3** | **.473** | **.500** | .778 | 3.8 | **6.0** | **2.0** | **.8** | 19.5 |
| 2016 | Charlotte | 7 | 7 | 37.1 | .366 | .326 | **.943** | 3.0 | 4.0 | 1.3 | .6 | **22.7** |
| 2020 | Boston | **17** | **17** | 36.9 | .441 | .310 | .852 | **4.1** | 5.1 | .9 | .4 | 19.6 |
| 2021 | Boston | 3 | 3 | 30.3 | .317 | .176 | .900 | 4.0 | 4.0 | .3 | .0 | 12.7 |
| Career | | 31 | 31 | 36.5 | .412 | .324 | .868 | 3.8 | 4.8 | 1.1 | .5 | 19.6 |

=== EuroLeague ===
| Year | Team | GP | GS | MPG | FG% | 3P% | FT% | RPG | APG | SPG | BPG | PPG | PIR |
|---|---|---|---|---|---|---|---|---|---|---|---|---|---|
| 2023–24 | Monaco | 26 | 1 | 11.0 | .389 | .364 | .778 | 1.4 | 1.1 | 0.4 | .0 | 4.4 | 4.6 |
| Career | | 26 | 1 | 11.0 | .389 | .364 | .778 | 1.4 | 1.1 | .4 | .0 | 4.4 | 4.6 |

=== College ===
| Year | Team | GP | GS | MPG | FG% | 3P% | FT% | RPG | APG | SPG | BPG | PPG |
|---|---|---|---|---|---|---|---|---|---|---|---|---|
| 2008–09 | Connecticut | 36 | 2 | 25.2 | **.470** | .271 | .715 | 3.5 | 2.9 | 1.1 | .2 | 8.9 |
| 2009–10 | Connecticut | 34 | 34 | 35.2 | .405 | **.339** | .767 | 4.3 | **5.0** | **2.0** | **.4** | 14.6 |
| 2010–11 | Connecticut | **41** | **41** | **37.6** | .428 | .330 | **.819** | **5.4** | 4.5 | 1.9 | .2 | **23.5** |
| Career | | 111 | 77 | 32.8 | .428 | .325 | .782 | 4.3 | 4.4 | 1.7 | .2 | 16.1 |

== Awards and honors ==
- Bronx Walk of Fame (2025)

=== Basketball ===
NBA

- 4× NBA All-Star (2017, 2018, 2019, 2020)
- All-NBA Third Team (2019)
- 2× NBA Sportsmanship Award (2017, 2018)

College

- NCAA champion (2011)
- Bob Cousy Award (2011)
- Lute Olson Award (2011)
- NCAA Final Four Most Outstanding Player (2011)
- Consensus first team All-American (2011)
- Big East tournament MVP (2011)
- NCAA Final Four All-Tournament Team (2011)
- Maui Invitational tournament MVP (2011)
- All-Big East First Team (2011)
- All-Big East Third Team (2010)
- All-Big East All-Rookie Team (2009)

EuroLeague

- LNB Élite Champion (French Championships 2023–24)

== Personal life ==
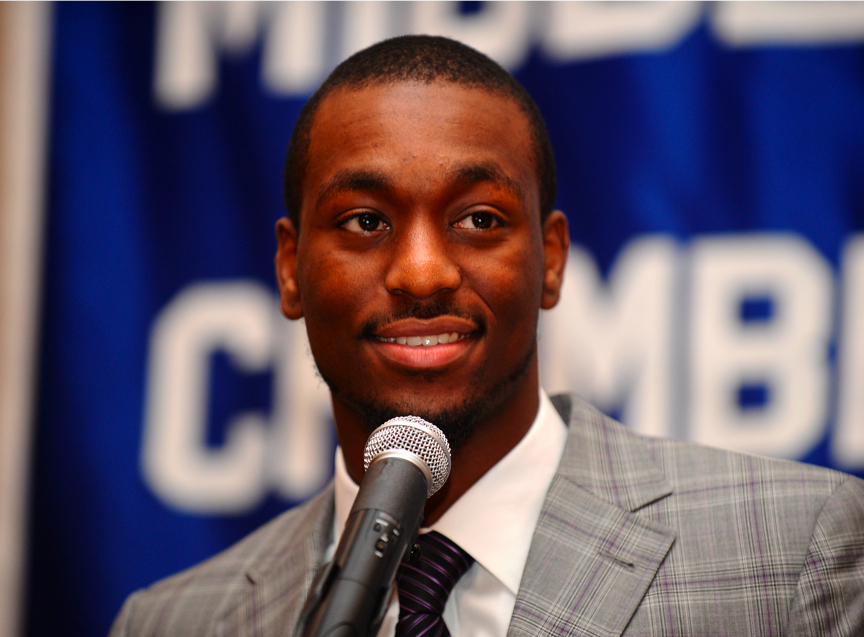
Walker in a press conference at Middlesex Chamber of Commerce breakfast

Walker is the son of Paul and Andrea Walker. His parents met in his father's native Antigua, while his mother is originally from St. Croix, U.S. Virgin Islands and was raised in the Bronx. He has two brothers, Akil and Keya, and two sisters named Sharifa and Kayla.

Walker grew up in the Sack-Wern Houses in Soundview, Bronx.

Walker is also a dancer. He performed three times at the Apollo Theater for the TV show Showtime at the Apollo.

On June 21, 2011, Walker released a mixtape in collaboration with DJ Skee and Skee Sports. The mixtape features songs inspired by and inspiring to Walker.

In 2011, Walker signed a multi-year sponsorship deal with Under Armour. In 2015, Walker's contract with Under Armour expired. He subsequently signed with Jordan Brand, a subsidiary of Nike.

Walker made an appearance in the film Marty Supreme playing a member of the Harlem Globetrotters alongside fellow former NBA player Tracy McGrady.

== See also ==
- List of NBA franchise career scoring leaders
- List of NBA career 3-point scoring leaders
- List of NBA single-game scoring leaders
