= Raymond Pointu =

French sports journalist (1940–2026)

- Born: 28 February 1940
- Died: 2 September 2026 (aged 86)
- Occupation: Sports journalist

Raymond Pointu (French: [ʁɛmˈɔ̃ pwɛ̃tˈy]; 28 February 1940 – 2 September 2026) was a French sports journalist.

Pointu began his career with Miroir Sprint before moving to Le Monde in 1970, where he received the Prix du meilleur article sportif in 1976. In 1977, he joined Agence France-Presse, where he spent the remainder of his career. In 2013, he received the Prix Robert-Parienté. That year, he also joined the Gloire du sport.

Pointu died on 2 September 2026, at the age of 86.

== Books ==
- Juan Antonio Samaranch, 1894-1994, l'héritage trahi (1994)
- Un siècle de Jeux Olympiques 1896- 1996? les exploits et les hommes
- 100 champions pour un siècle de sport (2000)
- Les Marathons olympiques (Athènes 1896 - Athènes 2004) (2004)
