= Jacky Chazalon =

French basketball player

Personal information
- Born: 24 March 1945 (age 81) Alès, France
- Listed height: 5 ft 7 in (1.70 m)
- Position: Point guard
- Number: 10

Career history
- 1960–1961: JS Alès
- 1961–1962: Alès BC
- 1962–1963: Valence BC
- 1963–1964: AS Montferrand
- 1964–1976: Clermont UC

Career highlights
- Glory of Sport (2003); French Basketball Hall of Fame (2004)
- FIBA Hall of Fame
Medals
Women's Basketball
Representing France
EuroBasket Women
| Silver medal – second place | 1970 Netherlands | Team |

Jacqueline Chazalon (born 24 March 1945), known as Jacky Chazalon, is a retired French FIBA basketball player. Chazalon played for the France women's national basketball team from 1963 to 1976 and won silver at the EuroBasket Women 1970 Championship. During her time in FIBA, she played in the 1971 FIBA World Championship for Women and the 1976 Pre-Olympic Basketball Tournament for Women. Chazalon was named France's Women Basketball Player of the Century in 2000. She was awarded the Glory of Sport in 2003 and inducted into the FIBA Hall of Fame in 2007.

== Early life ==
Chazalon was born on 24 March 1945 in Alès, France.

== Career ==
Chazalon began her basketball career in 1960. After playing for multiple teams for one-year terms, she played for Clermont UC from 1964 to 1976. During her time with Clermont, she won the French League Championships consecutively from 1968 to 1976 and was the runner-up in the EuroLeague Women Championship four times between 1971 and 1976.

While playing in FIBA Europe, Chazalon was a member of the France women's national basketball team from 1963 to 1976 and won a silver medal in the EuroBasket Women 1970 Championship. She played in six EuroBasket Women championships from 1964 to 1976 excluding 1974. In world competitions, Chazalon played in the 1971 FIBA World Championship for Women and 1976 Pre-Olympic Basketball Tournament for Women. Apart from playing basketball, Chazalon worked as a gym teacher. Outside of France, Chazalon was invited to play at a men's basketball camp in Pocono Pines, Pennsylvania against National Basketball Association players Campy Russell and Dave Bing.

== Awards and honors ==
Chazalon was awarded the Robert Busnel Medal in 1994 by the French Basketball Federation and named the Female Basketball Player of the Century in 2000. She was inducted into the FIBA Hall of Fame in 2007. Gymnasiums in Feytiat and Savigny-le-Temple, France were opened and named after Chazalon.
