= Wormeldange-Haut =

Coordinates: 49.610175°N 6.399536°E

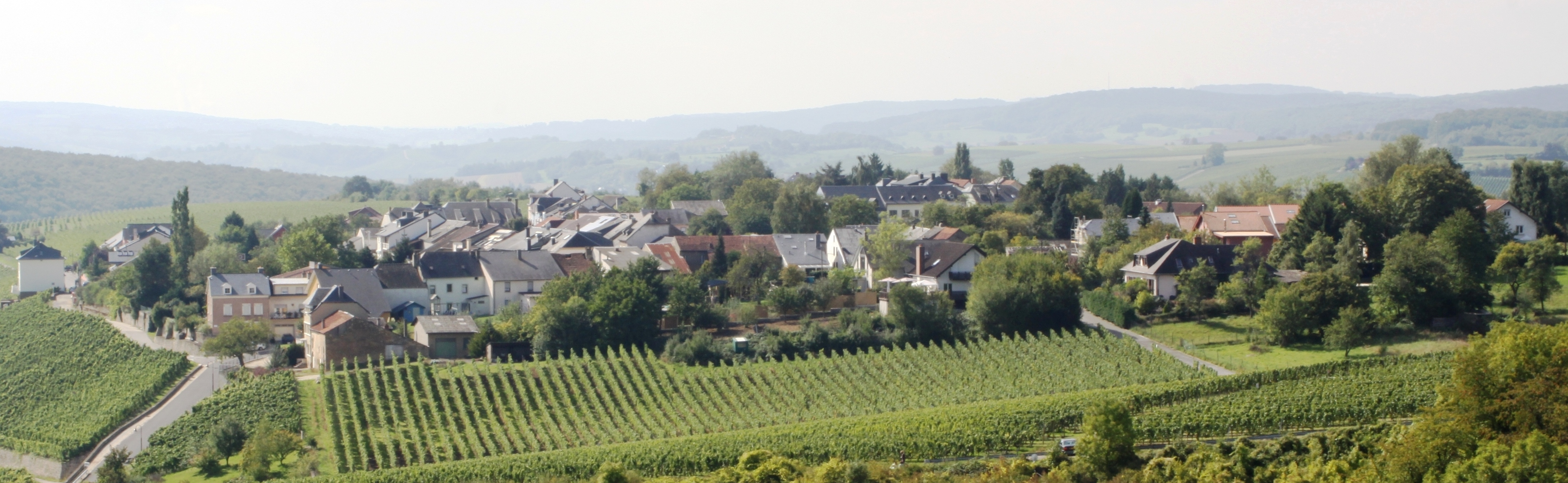
Panoramic view of Wormeldange-Haut

Wormeldange-Haut (Luxembourgish: Wuermer Bierg or (locally) Wormerberreg; German: Oberwormeldingen) is a small town in the commune of Wormeldange, in south-eastern Luxembourg. As of September 2026, the town has a population of 419.
