= Ehnen =

Town in Luxembourg

Coordinates: 49°36′N 6°23′E

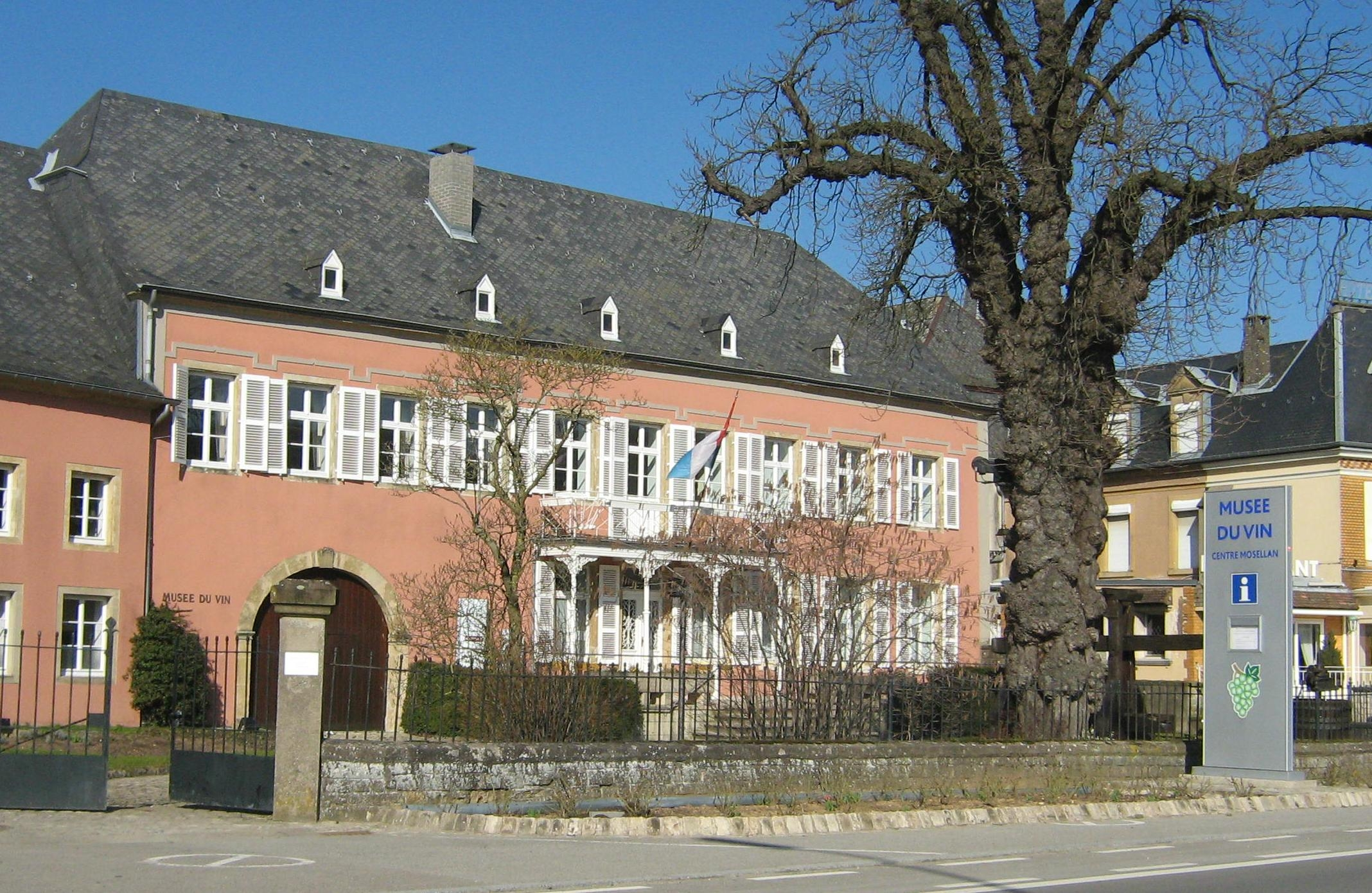
Wine Museum in Ehnen, Luxembourg

Ehnen (German pronunciation: [ˈeːnən]; Luxembourgish: Éinen) is a small town in the commune of Wormeldange, in south-eastern Luxembourg. As of September 2026, the town has a population of 957.

Ehnen is home to Luxembourg's Moselle Wine Museum which is open from the beginning of April to the end of October. The Wine Museum also houses Rent A Bike Miserland which encourages individuals and families to explore the river and vineyard/forest bicycle pathways. In town is also the only circular church built in Luxembourg. The medieval town center has covered pedestrian walkways (Rue Clas von Ehnen), medieval style bridges, traces of a watermill and several operating wineries.
