= Wormeldange =

Wormeldange Wuermer (Luxembourgish) Wormeldingen (German)
- Commune
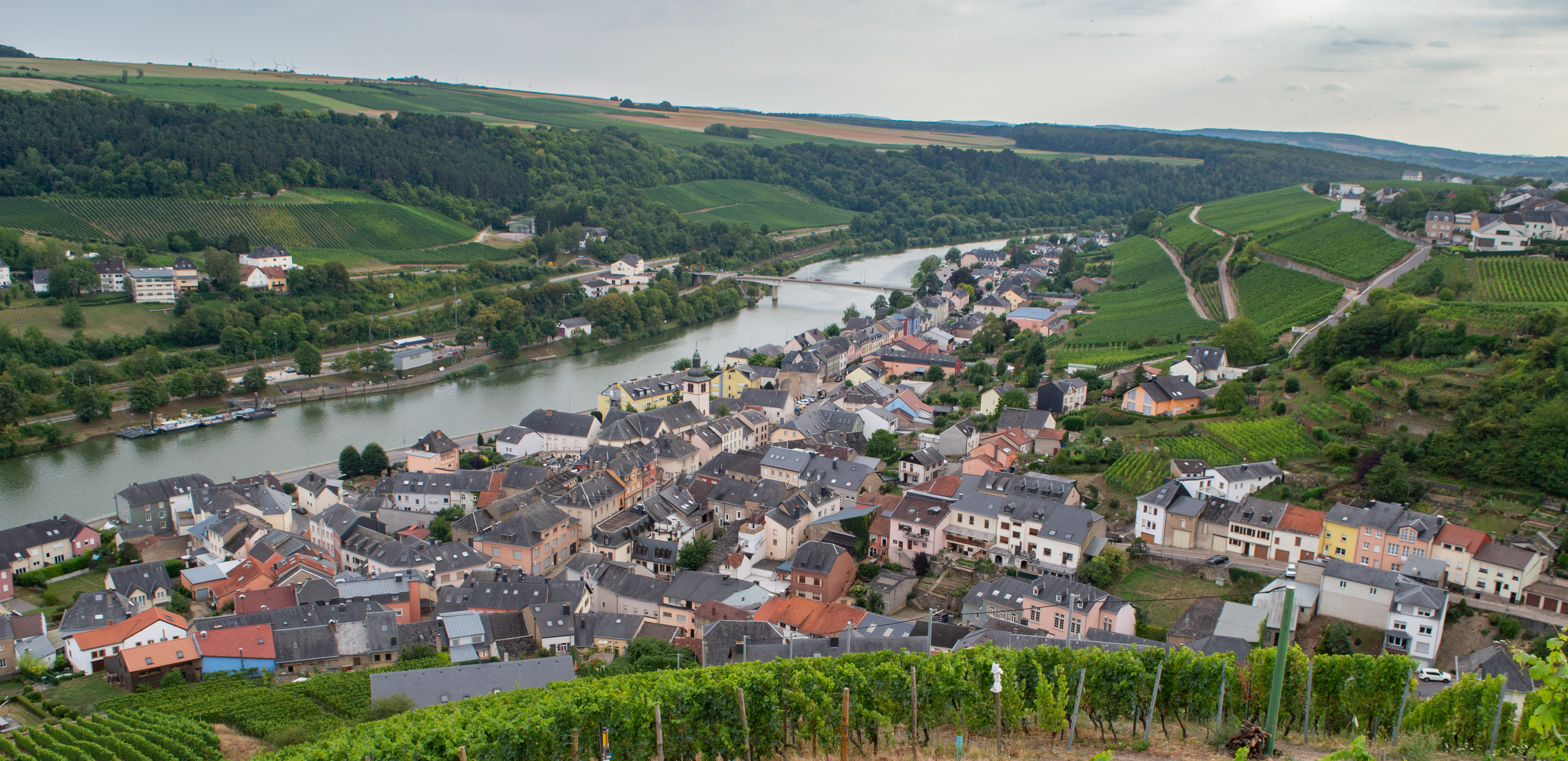
- Wormeldange seen from the nearby chapel Koeppchen

- Coat of arms

- Map of Luxembourg with Wormeldange highlighted in orange, and the canton in dark red
- Coordinates: 49.6111°N 6.4056°E
- Country: Luxembourg
- Canton: Grevenmacher

Government
  - Mayor: Claude Pundel (CSV)

Area
  - Total: 17.25 km^{2} (6.66 sq mi)
  - Rank: 68th of 100
- Highest elevation: 355 m (1,165 ft)
  - Rank: 82nd of 100
- Lowest elevation: 137 m (449 ft)
  - Rank: 3rd of 100

Population (2026)
  - Total: 3,289
  - Rank: 52nd of 100
  - Density: 190.7/km^{2} (493.8/sq mi)
  - Rank: 46th of 100
- Time zone: UTC+1 (CET)
  - Summer (DST): UTC+2 (CEST)
- LAU 2: LU0001108
- Website: wormeldange.lu
- 'Wormer' in Luxembourgish

Wormeldange (French pronunciation: [vɔʁmɛldɑ̃ʒ]; Luxembourgish: Wuermer [ˈvuːɐ̯mɐ] or locally Wormer; German: Wormeldingen [ˈvɔʁml̩ˌdɪŋən]) is a commune and small town in eastern Luxembourg. It is part of the canton of Grevenmacher.

Video of Wormeldange in 2021

As of September 2026, the town of Wormeldange, which lies in the south of the commune, has a population of 997. Other towns within the commune include Ahn, Ehnen, Machtum, and Wormeldange-Haut.

== Population ==
Historical population

Year	Pop.	±%
1821	1,999	—
1851	2,620	+31.1%
1900	2,422	−7.6%
1910	2,337	−3.5%
1922	2,306	−1.3%
1935	2,154	−6.6%

Year	Pop.	±%
1947	1,976	−8.3%
1960	1,888	−4.5%
1970	1,969	+4.3%
1981	2,013	+2.2%
1990	2,105	+4.6%
2000	2,274	+8.0%

Year	Pop.	±%
2005	2,307	+1.5%
2010	2,451	+6.2%
2015	2,654	+8.3%
2020	2,970	+11.9%
2021	3,054	+2.8%

Source data

== Notable people ==
- Max Hengel (1977-2024), Luxembourgish politician, Mayor of Wormeldange (2017-2020, 2023-2024), Member of the Chamber of Deputies (2022-2024)
