= Léo Lacroix =

Léo Lacroix may refer to:

- Léo Lacroix (skier), a French alpine skier who competed in the 1960s
- Léo Lacroix (footballer), a Swiss professional footballer
