= JSA Bordeaux Basket =

JSA Bordeaux
- Leagues: Nationale Masculine 1
- Founded: 1938; 87 years ago
- History: JSA Bordeaux Basket (1938–present)
- Arena: Sports Palace Bordeaux
- Capacity: 2,609
- Location: Bordeaux, France
- President: Boris Diaw; Eric Sarrazin
- Website: www.jsabordeauxbasket.fr

JSA Bordeaux Métropole Basket is a professional basketball club based in Bordeaux, France. The club plays in the NM1, the Third-tier level league of France.

== History ==
As a teenager, Boris Diaw started his career with JSA. Diaw also played for JSA during the 2011 NBA lockout. He was also a president of the club.

== Players ==
=== Notable players ===
Note: Flags indicate national team eligibility at FIBA-sanctioned events. Players may hold other non-FIBA nationalities not displayed.

Criteria

To appear in this section a player must have either:

- Set a club record or won an individual award while at the club
- Played at least one official international match for their national team at any time
- Played at least one official NBA match at any time.

- (France) Boris Diaw
- (France) Élie Okobo
- (Ivory Coast) Issife Soumahoro
