= Ahn, Luxembourg =

Ahn Ohn
- Village
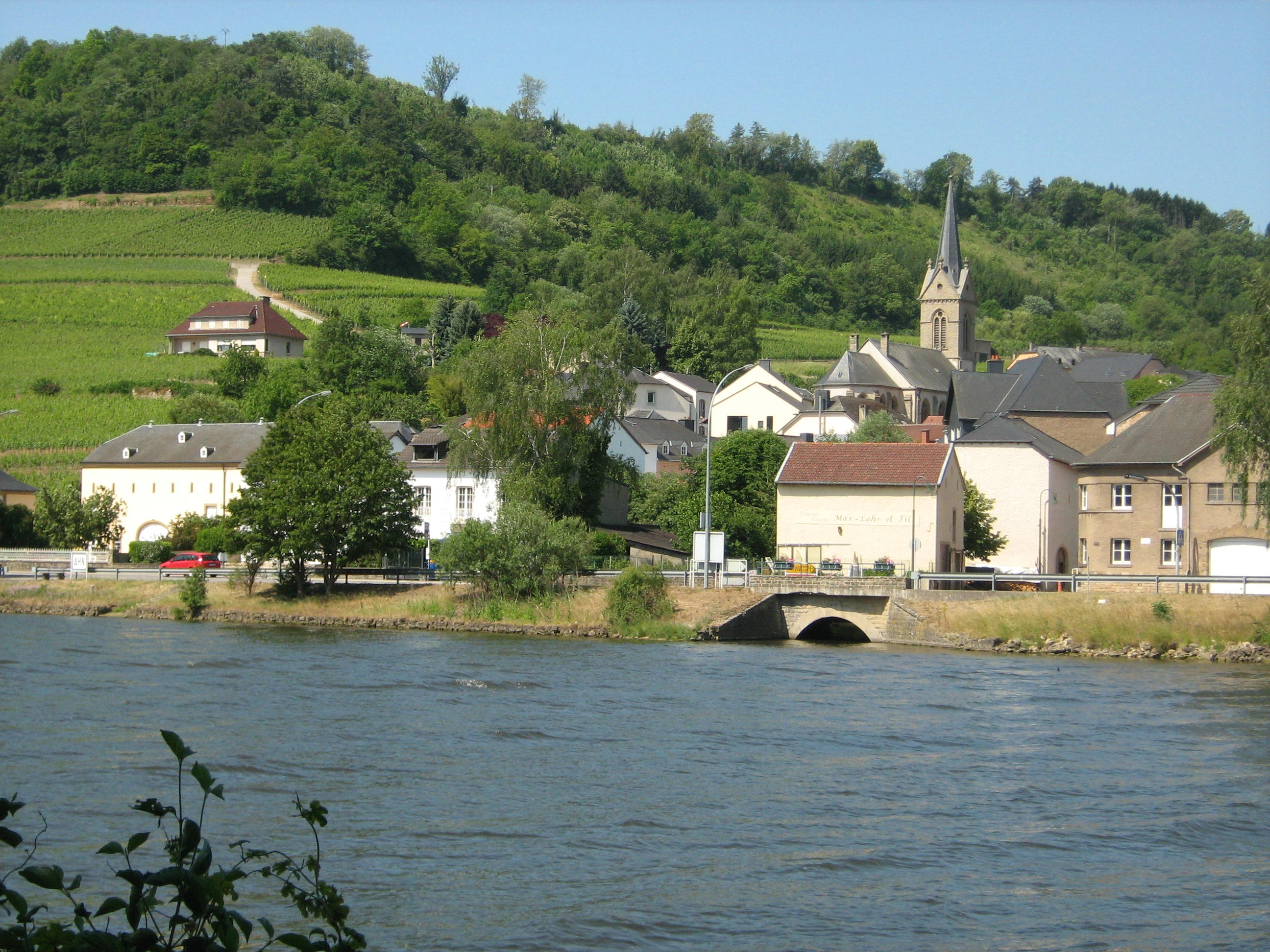
- Ahn, seen across the Moselle River

- Location within Luxembourg
- Coordinates: 49.6280°N 6.4170°E
- Country: Luxembourg
- Canton: Grevenmacher
- Municipality: Wormeldange

Population (2026)
  - Total: 286
- Time zone: UTC+1 (CET)
  - Summer (DST): UTC+2 (CEST)

Ahn (Luxembourgish: Ohn) is a wine-growing village in the municipality of Wormeldange in the canton of Grevenmacher, southeastern Luxembourg. As of 2026, its population is 286.

The lower part of the village lies along the Moselle River on National Route 10. The community extends westward through the valley of the Donwerbach from river level at about 140 m to approximately 200 m above sea level.

Besides National Route 10, Ahn lies on road CR142, which leads through Flaxweiler to Potaschberg.

== History ==
The village was recorded under the name Aen or Ayn in earlier sources. The name derives etymologically from Anam, a Celtic adaptation of the Latin paludem ("marsh"), referring to a marsh in the Donwerbach valley.

Archaeological finds indicate a Roman presence in the area. Construction of a house in 1873 exposed a Roman grave with an urn; a millstone was found at a vineyard between Ahn and Machtum in 1875; and road construction between the two villages in 1970 uncovered the remains of a Roman bath.

The estate of Ahn is first documented in May 1245 as "Curia de Ana". By the will of Alexander, Herr von Soleuvre, his two nephews — the knights Anselm and Dietrich — were to receive revenues from the farms of Ahn, Flaxweiler, Tétange, and Kayl after his death.

In January 1358, Wenceslaus I, Duke of Luxembourg, granted Grevenmacher the right to hold a weekly market; Ahn was among 41 villages in the judicial district required to attend. By an agreement of 9 July 1376, Heinrich, Herr von Limpach, sold the villages of Flaxweiler and Ahn to Sophia von Soleuvre.

The village was destroyed in 1552 during the campaign of King Henry II of France and Margrave Albert of Brandenburg-Kulmbach, and again severely damaged by flooding in 1596.

A census ordered by Empress Maria Theresa in 1766 recorded 19 households with 105 residents in Ahn, and listed three active vineyards: op der Uet, am Hang, and am Pällemberg.

== Vineyards ==
During Luxembourg's membership of the Zollverein in the 19th and early 20th centuries, Ahn produced wine primarily from Elbling grapes (then also called "Kleinberger"), much of it exported to Germany. Riesling cultivation remained rare until the early 20th century.

The district map of 1910 recorded approximately 420 acres (170 ha) of vineyards shared between Ahn and Machtum. After the First World War the local viticulture declined until a voluntary land consolidation programme reorganised the vineyards from 1,809 parcels averaging 7.2 ares each into 347 parcels averaging 37.5 ares, supported by the Consolidation Act of 25 May 1964.

The main vineyard sites today are Gellebour, Palmberg, Pietert, and Vogelsang.

== See also ==
- List of villages in Luxembourg
