= Sasha (name) =

- Pronunciation: /ˈsæʃə/ SASH-ə /ˈsɑːʃə/ SAH-shə
- Gender: Unisex

Origin
- Origin: Slavic
- Meaning: defender, helper of mankind

Other names
- Related names: Alexandra, Alexander, Aleksandr(a), Aleksandar, Aleksaša, Saša, Sašura, Šurik, Sandy, Sascha, Sacha, Sash, Sasho, Sasza, Sachie, Sacheverell, Oleksandr(a)

Sasha is a name which originated among Slavic peoples from Eastern and Southern Europe as the shortened version of Alexander and Alexandra. It is also used as a surname, although very rarely. Alternative spellings include: Саша (Sasha – Belarusian, Russian, Serbo-Croatian, Ukrainian), Сашо (Sasho – Bulgarian), Саше (Sashe – Macedonian), Saša (Slovenian, Serbo-Croatian, Czech, Slovak, Latvian, Lithuanian), Sasza (Polish), Sașa (Romanian), Sacha (French), Sascha (German), Sascia (Italian), Sasja (Danish and Swedish) and סשה (Sasha – Yiddish).

== Usage ==
This name is especially common in Europe, where it is used by males as a diminutive of Alexandra and Alexander, respectively. Despite its popularity in informal usage, the name is rarely recorded on birth certificates in countries such as Belarus, the Czech Republic, Russia, Slovakia, and Ukraine, as it is considered a diminutive, not a formal name. Exceptions are Croatia, Germany, Serbia, Slovenia, Bosnia and Herzegovina, Montenegro, North Macedonia and Switzerland.

In Italy or in French-speaking regions (Belgium, France, and Quebec), Sasha is more often given to males. In the United States the name is almost exclusively used for girls and ranked number 569 among U.S. baby names in 2014, although it didn't gain popularity until the 1970s.

== Notable people bearing this name ==
Full Name	First Name Spelling	Surname	Years	Notability
Sacha Abercorn	Alexandra "Sacha"	Abercorn (Hamilton)	1946–2018	British peeress and philanthropist
Sasha Alexander	Sasha	Alexander	1973–	American actress
Sasha Allen	Sasha	Allen	1982–	American singer and actress
Sasha Andrews	Sasha	Andrews	1983–	Canadian football defender
Saša Antunović	Saša	Antunović	1974–	Serbian footballer
Sasha Argov	Sasha	Argov	1914–1995	Russian-born Israeli composer
Sasha Artemev	Sasha	Artemev	1985–	American gymnast
Sasha Banks	Sasha	Banks	1992–	American wrestler
Sacha Baron Cohen	Sacha	Baron Cohen	1971–	English actor and comedian of Ali G, Borat, and Brüno fame
Aleksander ''Sasha'' Barkov	Sasha	Barkov	1995–	Finnish hockey player
Sasha Barrese	Sasha	Barrese	1981–	American actress
Sacha Bennett	Sacha	Bennett	1971–	English filmmaker
Sascha Bilay	Sascha	Bilay	1979–	German politician
Saša Bjelanović	Saša	Bjelanović	1979–	Croatian football player
Saša Bogunović	Saša	Bogunović	1982–	Serbian football player
Sacha Boisvert	Sacha	Boisvert	2006–	Canadian ice hockey player
Sasha Calle	Sasha	Calle	1995-	American actress
Sasha Chorny	Sasha	Chorny	1880–1932	Russian poet
Saša Cilinšek	Saša	Cilinšek	1982–	Serbian football player
Saša Ćirić	Saša	Ćirić	1968–	Football player from the Republic of Macedonia, of Serbian origin
Sasha Cohen	Sasha	Cohen	1984–	American Olympic figure skater
Sasha Cooke	Sasha	Cooke		American mezzo-soprano
Saša Ćurčić	Saša	Ćurčić	1972–	Serbian former football midfielder
Sasha De Sola	Sasha	De Sola	1988–	American ballet dancer
Sacha Dhawan	Sacha	Dhawan	1984–	English actor
Sascha Dikiciyan	Sascha	Dikiciyan	1970–	German musician, known as Sonic Mayhem
Sacha Distel	Sacha	Distel	1933–2004	French singer
Sasha Dobson	Sasha	Dobson	1979–	American jazz singer
Saša Đorđević	Saša	Đorđević	1981–	Serbian footballer
Saša Đorđević	Aleksandar Saša	Đorđević	1967–	Serbian basketball player and coach
Saša Dragin	Saša	Dragin	1972–	Minister in Serbia
Saša Drakulić	Saša	Drakulić	1972–	Serbian footballer
Sasha Farber	Sasha	Farber	1984–	Soviet-born Australian-American dancer
Sacha Fenestraz	Sacha	Fenestraz	1999–	French-Argentine racing driver
Sasha Filipenko	Sasha	Filipenko	1984–	Belarusian writer
Sasha Gabor	Sasha	Gabor	1945–2008	Norwegian pornographic film director and actor
Saša Gajser	Saša	Gajser	1974–	Slovenian footballer
Saša Gedeon	Saša	Gedeon	1970–	Czech director
Sascha Gerstner	Sascha	Gerstner	1977–	Guitarist of the power metal band Helloween
Sasha Gollish	Sasha	Gollish	1981–	Canadian competitive runner
Sasha Gradiva	Sasha	Gradiva	1979–	Russian singer
Sasha Grey	Sasha	Grey	1988–	American pornographic actress
Sacha Guitry	Sacha	Guitry	1885–1957	French actor and playwright
Sascha Hehn	Sascha	Hehn	1954–	German actor
Sacha Hickey	Sacha	Hickey	2003–	English boxer
Sasha Hostyn	Sasha	Hostyn	1993–	Canadian professional video game player
Saša Ilić	Saša	Ilić	1970–	Macedonian football goalkeeper
Saša Ilić	Saša	Ilić	1972–	Serbian-Australian football goalkeeper
Saša Ilić	Saša	Ilić	1977–	Serbian football midfielder
Saša Imprić	Saša	Imprić	1986–	Croatian swimmer
Sasha Issenberg	Sasha	Issenberg		American journalist
Saša Ivanović	Saša	Ivanović	1984–	Montenegrin football goalkeeper
Saša Kajkut	Saša	Kajkut	1984–	Bosnian football player
Sasha Kaun	Sasha	Kaun	1985–	Russian basketball player
Sacha Killeya-Jones	Sacha	Killeya-Jones	1998–	American-English basketball player for Hapoel Gilboa Galil of the Israeli Basketball Premier League
Sascha Kindred	Sascha	Kindred	1977–	English Paralympic swimmer
Sacha Kljestan	Sacha	Kljestan	1985–	American footballer
Sascha Klein	Sascha	Klein	1985–	German Olympic diver
Saša Kocić	Saša	Kocić	1976–	Serbian football player
Alexander Kolowrat	Alexander "Sascha"	Kolowrat	1886–1927	American-born Austrian film producer of Bohemian (Czech) descent
Sasha Kolpakov	Sasha	Kolpakov	1943–	Russian musician
Sascha Konietzko	Sascha	Konietzko	1961–	German musician, founder/frontman of Industrial band KMFDM
Saša Kovačević (footballer)	Saša	Kovačević	1973–	Serbian international footballer
Sasha Kropotkin	Sasha	Kropotkin	1887–1966	Russian-American émigré and writer
Sasha Kurmaz	Sasha	Kurmaz	1986–	Ukrainian artist and photographer
Sasha Lane	Sasha	Lane	1995–	American actress
Sasha Lazard	Sasha	Lazard		American singer
Sascha Lienesch	Sascha	Lienesch	1978–	German politician
Saša Lošić	Saša	Lošić	1964–	Yugoslavian composer
Saša Lozar	Saša	Lozar	1980–	Croatian pop singer of the former boy band Saša, Tin i Kedžo
Sasha Luss	Sasha	Luss	1992–	Russian model and actress
Sasha Mäkilä	Sasha	Mäkilä	1973–	Finnish conductor and musician
Saša Matić	Saša	Matić	1978–	Bosnian Serb singer
Sacha McMeeking	Sacha	McMeeking	1978/9–	New Zealand academic, lawyer and activist
Sasha Meneghel	Sasha	Meneghel	1998–	Model, actress and volleyball player
Sasha Mitchell	Sasha	Mitchell	1967–	American actor, famous for his role in the TV series Step By Step
Sasha Montenegro	Sasha	Montenegro	1946–	Mexican actress
Sasha Obama	Sasha	Obama	2001–	The younger daughter of U.S. President Barack Obama
Saša Obradović	Saša	Obradović	1969–	Serbian basketball player
Sasha P	Sasha	P	1983–	Nigerian musician (real name Anthonia Yetunde Alabi)
Saša Papac	Saša	Papac	1980–	Bosnia and Herzegovina association footballer
Sacha Parkinson	Sacha	Parkinson	1992–	English actress
Sasha Pavlović	Sasha	Pavlović	1983–	NBA basketball player
Saša Peršon	Saša	Peršon	1965–	Croatian footballer
Sacha Peter	Sacha	Peter		Canadian politician
Saša Petričić	Saša	Petričić	1963–	Serbian Canadian journalist
Sasha Pieterse	Sasha	Pieterse	1996–	American actress
Sasha Pivovarova	Sasha	Pivovarova	1985–	Russian model
Sascha Pohflepp	Sascha	Pohflepp	1978–2019	German artist and writer
Sascha Radetsky	Sascha	Radetsky	1977–	American ballet dancer and actor
Saša Radivojević	Saša	Radivojević	1979–	Serbian football goalkeeper
Saša Rakezić	Saša	Rakezić	1963–	Serbian cartoonist
Saša Ranić	Saša	Ranić	1981–	Slovenian footballer
Sascha Riether	Sascha	Riether	1983–	German footballer
Sascha Ring	Sascha	Ring	1978–	German musician
Sasha Roiz	Sasha	Roiz	1973–	Canadian actor
Sacha Sacket	Sacha	Sacket	1978–	Singer-songwriter from California
Alexander "Sasha" Shulgin	Alexander "Sasha"	Shulgin	1925–2014	American chemist
Sascha Scheleter	Sascha	Schleter	1985–	German bobsledder
Saša Simonović	Saša	Simonović	1975–	Serbian footballer
Sasha Skenderija	Sasha	Skenderija	1968–	Bosnian-American poet
Sasha Sökol	Sasha	Sökol	1970–	Mexican actress and singer
Saša Stamenković	Saša	Stamenković	1985–	Serbian football goalkeeper
Sasha Tirupati	Sasha	Tirupati	1989–	Indian-Canadian singer
Saša Todić	Saša	Todić	1974–	Serbian football goalkeeper
Saša Toperić	Saša	Toperić	1972–	Bosnian Israeli concert pianist
Sacha Alexandre Trudeau	"Sacha" Alexandre	Trudeau	1973–	Canadian filmmaker and journalist, son of Pierre Trudeau
Saša Vasiljević	Saša	Vasiljević	1979–	Bosnian basketball player
Saša Viciknez	Saša	Viciknez	1974–	Serbian footballer
Sasha Victorine	Sasha	Victorine	1978–	American football player
Sacha Visagie	Sacha	Visagie	–	Canadian singer and songwriter
Saša Vlaisavljević	Saša	Vlaisavljević	1968–	Serbian engineer, business executive, and politician
Sasha Vujačić	Sasha	Vujačić	1984–	Slovenian basketball player
Sasha Williams	Sasha	Williams	1982–	Canadian actress
Saša Živec	Saša	Živec	1991–	Slovenian footballer
Sascha Zverev	Alexander "Sascha"	Zverev	1997–	German tennis player

=== Codenames, stage personas, and alter egos ===
- Sasha (espionage), an alleged Soviet mole in the U.S. Central Intelligence Agency during the Cold War
- Sasha (DJ) (born 1969), born Alexander Coe
- Sasha (Jamaican musician) (born 1974), born Christine Chin
- Sasha (German singer) (born 1972), born Sascha Schmitz
- Sasha Alexander (born 1973), American actress; born Suzana Drobnjakovic
- Sasha Banks (born 1992), American professional wrestler now known as Mercedes Moné; born Mercedes Justine Kaestner Varnado
- Sasha Fierce, the alter ego of Beyoncé (born 1981)
- Sasha Alex Sloan (born 1995), born Alexandra Artourovna Yatchenko
- Sasha Velour (born 1987), famous drag queen best known for appearing on RuPaul's Drag Race (season 9); born Alexander Hedges Steinberg

== Animals ==
- Sasha (dog) (2004–2008), a Labrador dog that served in the British Army
- Galianora sacha (G. sacha), Ecuadorian jumping spider

== Fictitious or mythical entities ==
=== Legend, myth, and religion ===
- Sasha and Zamani, spirits, two stages of time in Central and Eastern African cultures

=== Fictional animals and creatures ===
- Sasha, a character from the movie, Help! I'm a Fish
- Sasha, bird character from Walt Disney's Peter and the Wolf (1946 film)
- Sasha, cat from the book series Warriors by Erin Hunter
- Sacha, desman (water mole) in the animated television program Noah's Island
- Sasha La Fleur, a character from the movie All Dogs Go to Heaven 2, the television series All Dogs Go to Heaven: The Series, and An All Dogs Christmas Carol
- Sasha (Vampire), a character from the Twilight book and film series
- Sasha, a rabbit villager in the video game Animal Crossing: New Horizons

=== Fictional people ===
==== By surname ====
- Sasha Antonov, a character from the 2014 Canadian television series Bitten
- Sasha Barbicon, the owner of an art gallery from the game Titanic: Adventure Out of Time
- Sasha Belov, character from the TV show Make It or Break It
- Sasha Bezmel, character from the Australian soap opera Home and Away
- Sash Bishop, character from the Irish soap opera Fair City
- Sasha Bordeaux, DC Comics character, former ally of Batman
- Sasha Braus, character from the anime/manga series Attack on Titan
- Saša Bůčková, character from Czech sitcom Comeback
- Sasha Dixon, character in the British soap opera EastEnders
- Sasha Gilmore, a character in the American daytime drama General Hospital
- Alexander "Sasha" Nikolaevich Hell, the protagonist of The Qwaser of Stigmata
- Sasha James, a character from the horror podcast "The Magnus Archives"
- Sascha König, character from the television drama Inspector Rex, episode 8x13
- Sasha Kreutzev, character from the anime/novel series A Certain Magical Index (Toaru Majutsu no Index)
- Sacha Levy, AAU Registrar in the British medical drama series Holby City
- Sasha Nein, powerful Psychonaut and instructor from the game Psychonauts
- Sasha Perkins, character in the British soap opera EastEnders
- Sascha Petrosevitch, character from the 2002 film Half Past Dead
- Sasha Thompson, leader of the Mad Dogs and a target in CHERUB book Mad Dogs
- Sasha Valentine, character in the British soap opera Hollyoaks
- Sasha Waybright, from the American animated series Amphibia
- Sasha Williams (The Walking Dead), Tyreese's sharpshooter sister on The Walking Dead TV series
- Miss Sasha, a character from an animation based on Basics in Behavior.

==== Surnameless people ====
- Sasha, Russian pilot in the 2009 movie 2012 (film)
- Sasha, Ted Mundy's absolute friend in John le Carré's espionage novel Absolute Friends (2003)
- Sasha, commanding officer from the game Advance Wars: Dual Strike
- Sasha, romantic love interest of Ginger in Nickelodeon's As Told by Ginger
- Sascha, a reaper in the manga Black Butler by Yana Toboso
- Sasha, character from the Bratz line of fashion dolls, see List of Bratz characters
- Sascha, the Russian bartender at Rick's Café Américain, played by Leonid Kinskey in Casablanca (1942)
- Sasha, the enigmatic female hacker from the film Cube 2: Hypercube (2003)
- Sasha, the leader of The Reapers gang in Infamous (video game)
- Sasha, the character from the film The Last Station (2009)
- Sasha, the Muscovite princess in the novel Orlando: A Biography by Virginia Woolf
- Sasha, from the Papa Louie video games
- Sasha, the character from the Japanese manga Pita-Ten
- Sasha, the reincarnation of Athena in the manga Saint Seiya: The Lost Canvas
- Sasha, character from Adult Swim's Titan Maximum
- Captain Sasha from the Ratchet & Clank series
- Sweet Sasha, a doll from Ty Girlz
- Sasha, an adolescent schoolgirl from the 2023 Barbie movie
- Sascha … ein aufrechter Deutscher, subject and title of a Tote Hosen song
- Sasha, a non-binary character from the musical A Transgender Woman on the Internet, Crying

=== Inanimate objects ===
- Sasha is the name Heavy gives to his minigun in the game Team Fortress 2.
- The singer Lizzo named her flute Sasha.

== Similar names ==
Similar names in various languages include:

- Albanian: Dasha, Vasha
- Danish: Sasja
- Dutch: Saskia
- English: Sasha
- French: Sacha
- Georgian: Lasha
- German: Sascha
- Hindi: Asha, Sashi, Shashi, Shikha
- Macedonian: Sashka, Sasho
- Nepali: Asha, Aasha, Sashi
- Persian: Pasha, Rasha
- Portuguese: Sancha
- Russian: Саша, Sashka
- Ukrainian: Sashko
- Serbo-Croatian: Saša (Safiha / Sabiha in Bosnian)
- Slovak: Saša, Saška
- Slovenian: Saša
- Spanish: Sancha
- Swedish: Sassa
- Swiss: Sascha
- Thai: Sasicha
- Turkish: Saliha, Sabiha
