= Brandon Bass =

American basketball player (born 1985)

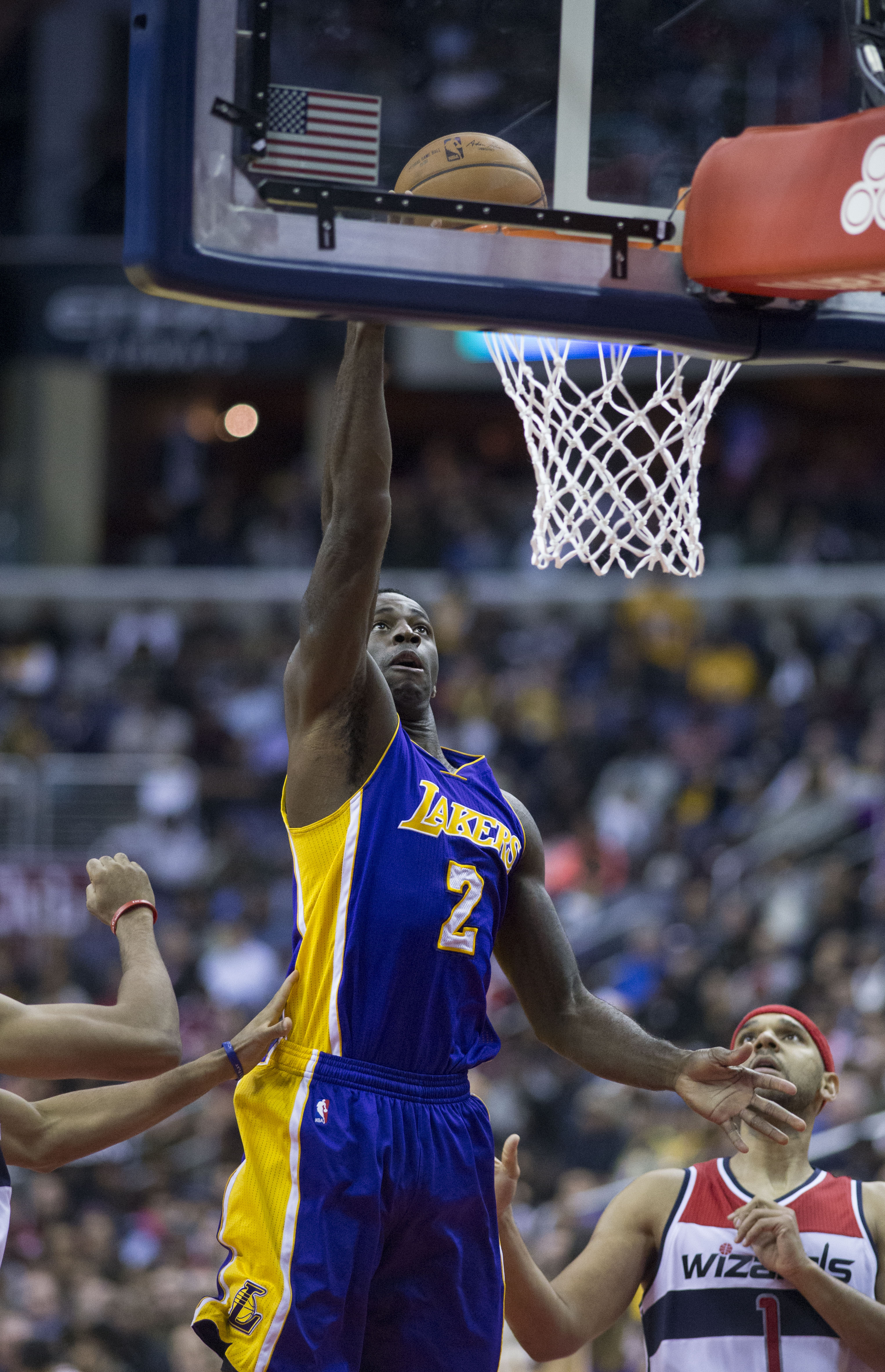
- Bass with the Los Angeles Lakers in 2015

Personal information
- Born: April 30, 1985 (age 41) Baton Rouge, Louisiana, U.S.
- Listed height: 6 ft 8 in (2.03 m)
- Listed weight: 250 lb (113 kg)

Career information
- High school: Capitol (Baton Rouge, Louisiana)
- College: LSU (2003–2005)
- NBA draft: 2005: 2nd round, 33rd overall pick
- Drafted by: New Orleans Hornets
- Playing career: 2005–2020
- Position: Power forward
- Number: 33, 32, 30, 2

Career history
- 2005–2007: New Orleans/Oklahoma City Hornets
- 2006: →Tulsa 66ers
- 2007–2009: Dallas Mavericks
- 2009–2011: Orlando Magic
- 2011–2015: Boston Celtics
- 2015–2016: Los Angeles Lakers
- 2016–2017: Los Angeles Clippers
- 2017–2020: Liaoning Flying Leopards

Career highlights
- SEC Player of the Year (2005); SEC Rookie of the Year – Coaches (2004); McDonald's All-American (2003); Second-team Parade All-American (2003)
- Stats at NBA.com
- Stats at Basketball Reference

Brandon Sam Bass (born April 30, 1985) is an American former professional basketball player. He played college basketball for the LSU Tigers and was selected in the 2005 NBA draft by the New Orleans Hornets. Bass played 12 seasons in the National Basketball Association (NBA) for the Hornets, Dallas Mavericks, Orlando Magic, Boston Celtics, Los Angeles Lakers and Los Angeles Clippers. He finished his career in 2020 after three seasons with the Liaoning Flying Leopards in China.

== Early life ==
Bass was born in Baton Rouge, Louisiana, the oldest of three siblings; he has a brother, Chris, and sister, Dashia. Bass is the son of Charles Joseph and Aretha Bass. Bass was raised by his mother until her death. When he was 10 years old, he witnessed his mother die from a heart attack. Bass and his siblings subsequently moved in with their father but due to not feeling comfortable at their father's home, Bass and his siblings moved in with their aunt, Estelle. While at his aunt's house, Bass was living with his siblings and five of his aunt's children. It wasn't until he was 13 years old that Bass began playing basketball competitively.

== High school career ==
Bass attended Capitol High School in Baton Rouge where he began gaining recognition for his play. By his senior year in 2002–03, he was ranked the seventh best power forward in the nation, the 11th best overall player in the nation, and the third best player in the Southeast by Rivals.com.

While in high school, Bass had a GPA of 2.7 with an ACT score of 17. He graduated as a part of the class of 2003. He received interest from Connecticut, LSU, Mississippi St., Cincinnati, Kentucky, Miami (FL), and USC to join their basketball programs. Of those schools, Bass received offers from Connecticut, LSU, Mississippi St, and USC, ultimately deciding on attending LSU.

Bass also received many honors while in high school, being named a part of the Parade All-American team, EA Sports Roundball Classic Roster, and the McDonald's All-America Game. Bass finished the McDonald's All-America Game with 14 points and 3 assists. While on the McDonald's All-American Team, Bass played alongside the likes of future NBA superstars such as LeBron James and Chris Paul.

== College career ==
Bass joined the LSU Tigers basketball team in 2003 and played for them until 2005. In his first year at LSU, Bass played 29 games, starting in all of them. As a freshman, Bass averaged an impressive 12.8 points, 7.4 rebounds, 1.9 blocks, in 34.9 minutes per game. In his second season, Bass played and started in 30 games, averaging 17.3 points, 9.1 rebounds, 1.6 blocks, and 33.6 minutes per game.

Bass received numerous honors while playing at LSU. In 2004, he was named a part of the SEC All-Freshman Team and was also named the SEC Freshman of the Year. In 2005, Bass was named a part of the SEC All-Tournament Team, First Team All-SEC (Coaches), SEC Player of the Year (Associated Press), and the SEC Player of the Year (Coaches).

Bass' career-high in points in college was 30 points in a game against Louisiana-Lafayette on November 21, 2004. He achieved his college career-high in rebounds with 17 against Mississippi State on February 16, 2005. He achieved his career-high in blocks with six on two separate occasions with his last one being in Houston on December 21, 2004. His career-high in minutes was 45, which came against Ohio State on January 15, 2005.

Bass left LSU after his sophomore year, choosing instead to declare for the 2005 NBA draft. He ended his college career with career averages of 15.1 points, 8.3 rebounds, 1.8 blocks, and 34.3 minutes per game. He started and played in a total of 59 games.

== Professional career ==
=== New Orleans Hornets (2005–2007) ===
Bass was drafted in the 2005 NBA draft by the New Orleans Hornets, being taken with the 33rd overall pick. On August 24, 2005, Bass signed a multi-year contract with the Hornets.

In his first season in the league, the Hornets twice assigned Bass to their NBA Development League affiliate, Tulsa 66ers. He ended up only playing one game in the D-League, scoring 16 points, along with 5 rebounds and 2 blocks.

In his time with the New Orleans Hornets, Bass averaged 2.2 points, 2.2 rebounds, 0.2 blocks, and 8.6 minutes per game. He played a total of 50 games, having started in 4 of them.

=== Dallas Mavericks (2007–2009) ===
On July 26, 2007, Bass signed a two-year deal with the Dallas Mavericks. On March 1, 2009, Bass made a turnaround jumper to give Jason Kidd his 10,000th career assist. In two seasons for Mavericks, he averaged 8.4 points and 4.5 rebounds in 160 games.

=== Orlando Magic (2009–2011) ===
On July 10, 2009, Bass signed a four-year deal with the Orlando Magic. In two seasons for the Magic, he averaged 9.1 points and 4.4 rebounds in 126 games.

=== Boston Celtics (2011–2015) ===
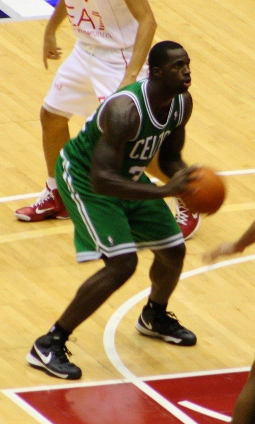
Bass with Boston in 2012

On December 12, 2011, Bass was traded to the Boston Celtics in exchange for Glen Davis and Von Wafer. In his first regular season game for the Celtics on December 25, 2011, he recorded 20 points and 11 rebounds in a 104–106 loss to the New York Knicks. On May 21, 2012, Bass tallied a playoff career-high 27 points to help the Celtics gain a 3–2 series lead over the Philadelphia 76ers. The Celtics won that series, but were eliminated in the next round by the Miami Heat. In the 2011–12 season, Bass established his career-high points average to 12.5 and his rebounds to 6.2 that increased the Celtics' offense and defense.

On July 14, 2012, Bass re-signed with the Celtics.

In January 2015, Bass re-gained his starting spot and finished the season averaging 10.6 points and 4.9 rebounds per game.

=== Los Angeles Lakers (2015–2016) ===
On July 9, 2015, Bass signed with the Los Angeles Lakers. He made his debut for the Lakers in the team's season opener against the Minnesota Timberwolves on October 28, recording 2 points and 6 rebounds in a 112–111 loss. On January 20, 2016, he scored a season-high 18 points in a loss to the Sacramento Kings.

=== Los Angeles Clippers (2016–2017) ===
On July 19, 2016, Bass signed with the Los Angeles Clippers. For the season he appeared in 52 games, averaging 5.6 points in 11.1 minutes per game.

=== Liaoning Flying Leopards (2017–2020) ===
In August 2017, Bass signed with the Liaoning Flying Leopards. Due to restrictions on international travel, Bass along with teammate Lance Stephenson were unable to return to China in June 2020 to finish the 2019–20 season with the team.

== National team career ==
In February 2021, Bass was selected to the 14-player roster for the final round of the 2022 FIBA AmeriCup qualification. On 19 February he scored 12 points in a 93–77 victory over Bahamas.

== Personal life ==
Bass' younger brother, Chris, played college basketball for Louisiana State as well. An avid hip-hop fan, Bass has been writing rap songs since he was 11 and recording them since he was 16. The main topic he chooses to address in his music is his upbringing and overall life. Bass is married to Melissa Prejean. The couple has one son, Brandon Jr., and one daughter, Bella.

== Career statistics ==
Legend
GP	Games played	GS	Games started	MPG	Minutes per game
FG%	Field goal percentage	3P%	3-point field goal percentage	FT%	Free throw percentage
RPG	Rebounds per game	APG	Assists per game	SPG	Steals per game
BPG	Blocks per game	PPG	Points per game	**Bold**	Career high

=== College ===
Year	Team	GP	GS	MPG	FG%	3P%	FT%	RPG	APG	SPG	BPG	PPG
2003–04	LSU	29	**29**	**35.0**	.504	.263	**.783**	7.4	.6	.7	**1.9**	12.8
2004–05	LSU	**30**	**29**	33.6	**.567**	**.462**	.777	**9.1**	**.8**	**.8**	1.6	**17.3**
Career		59	58	34.3	.540	.378	.780	8.2	.7	.8	1.8	15.1

=== NBA ===
==== Regular season ====
Year	Team	GP	GS	MPG	FG%	3P%	FT%	RPG	APG	SPG	BPG	PPG
2005–06	New Orleans	29	1	9.2	.400	.000	.632	2.3	.1	.1	.2	2.3
2006–07	New Orleans	21	3	7.7	.341	.000	.750	2.0	.1	.1	.1	2.0
2007–08	Dallas	79	1	19.7	.499	.000	.822	4.4	.7	.3	.6	8.3
2008–09	Dallas	81	0	19.4	.496	.000	.867	4.5	.5	.3	.7	8.5
2009–10	Orlando	50	3	13.0	.511	.000	.825	2.5	.4	.2	.5	5.8
2010–11	Orlando	76	51	26.1	.515	.000	.815	5.6	.8	.4	.7	11.2
2011–12	Boston	59	39	**31.7**	.479	.000	.810	**6.2**	.9	**.6**	**.9**	**12.5**
2012–13	Boston	81	69	27.6	.486	.000	.860	5.2	1.0	.5	.8	8.7
2013–14	Boston	**82**	**73**	27.6	.486	**.333**	.858	5.7	1.1	.4	**.9**	11.1
2014–15	Boston	**82**	43	23.5	.504	.281	.790	4.9	**1.3**	.5	.4	10.6
2015–16	L.A Lakers	66	0	20.3	.549	.000	.845	4.3	1.1	.5	.8	7.2
2016–17	L.A Clippers	52	0	11.1	**.575**	**.333**	**.875**	2.5	.4	.3	.2	5.6
Career		758	283	21.7	.499	.207	.832	4.5	.8	.4	.6	8.7

==== Playoffs ====
Year	Team	GP	GS	MPG	FG%	3P%	FT%	RPG	APG	SPG	BPG	PPG
2008	Dallas	5	0	26.6	.472	.000	**.960**	**6.8**	.4	.6	.6	**11.6**
2009	Dallas	10	0	19.2	**.550**	.000	.903	4.1	.7	.7	.4	9.4
2010	Orlando	7	0	6.0	.538	.000	.833	1.1	.1	.0	.0	2.7
2011	Orlando	6	6	23.2	.421	.000	.923	4.2	.3	.5	**.8**	7.3
2012	Boston	**20**	**20**	30.4	.463	.000	.922	5.3	.8	.7	.5	11.1
2013	Boston	6	5	**34.0**	.483	.000	.800	6.7	1.2	.3	.2	6.7
2015	Boston	4	4	21.5	.350	.000	.600	2.0	**2.5**	.3	**.8**	5.0
2017	L.A. Clippers	1	0	3.8	.333	.000	.000	1.0	.0	**1.0**	.0	2.0
Career		59	35	23.9	.471	.000	.890	4.4	.7	.5	.4	8.4
