= Shasha =

Shasha or Sha Sha may refer to:

== Places ==
- Shasha Forest Reserve, Nigeria
- Shasha River, Nigeria
- Shasheh or Shasha (Persian: ششه; ), a village in Iran

== People ==
- Sha Sha (singer) (born 1994), Zimbabwean singer
- Shasha Nakhai, Canadian film director
- Shashaa Tirupati (born 1989), Indian-Canadian singer
- Mark Shasha (born 1961), U.S. artist
- Dennis Shasha, U.S. professor
- Yifat Shasha-Biton (born 1973), Israeli politician
- Chung Hsin-yu (born 1983; also known as Sha Sha), Taiwanese host
- Shahid Kapoor (born 1981), Indian actor, sometimes nicknamed Sasha

== Other ==
- Sha Sha (album), a 2002 album by Ben Kweller
- Shasha dialect, a dialect of Nkoya language of Zambia
- Sha-Sha, part of Telly Inc. Arabic film streaming service
- "Sha-Sha", a 1938 song written by Jimmy Van Heusen
  - a minor hit for the Andrews Sisters

== See also ==
- Sha (disambiguation)
- Sasha (disambiguation)
