= Sasho =

Sasho is a male given name that is a diminutive of Alexander and which originates in Bulgaria and North Macedonia The name may refer to:

- Sasho Angelov (born 1969), Bulgarian football player and manager
- Sasho Cirovski (born 1962), American football coach
- Sasho Mijalkov (born 1965), Macedonian politician
- Sasho Pargov (born 1946), Bulgarian football player
- Sasho Petrovski (born 1975), Australian football player
- Sasho Nikolov, Canadian theoretical computer scientist

== See also ==
- Sasha (disambiguation)
