= 2011–12 Boston Celtics season =

Season of National Basketball Association team the Boston Celtics

- Division champions
- Head coach: Doc Rivers
- President: Danny Ainge
- General manager: Danny Ainge
- Owners: Boston Basketball Partners
- Arena: TD Garden

Results
- Record: 39–27 (.591)
- Place: Division: 1st (Atlantic); Conference: 4th (Eastern)
- Playoff finish: Eastern Conference finals (lost to Heat 3–4)
- Stats at Basketball Reference

Local media
- Television: CSN New England
- Radio: WEEI-FM

The 2011–12 Boston Celtics season was the 66th season of the franchise in the National Basketball Association (NBA). The Boston Celtics finished the regular season with a 39–27 won-loss record, which was the 4th best in the East, winning their 21st Atlantic Division title. Their longest winning and losing streaks were 5 games. The leading scorer was Paul Pierce, averaging 19.4 PPG. The leading rebounder was Kevin Garnett (8.2 RPG). Rajon Rondo led the team and the league in assists per-game with 11.7. The regular season was reduced from its usual 82 games to 66 due to the lockout. The Celtics made a relatively deep playoff run, where they defeated the Atlanta Hawks in six games in the First Round, and the Philadelphia 76ers in seven games in the Semifinals, eventually challenging the Miami Heat for the third consecutive season (the team who defeated them in last season's Semifinals), in the Eastern Conference finals. They ultimately lost the series in seven games to the eventual NBA champion.

Following the season, Ray Allen departed via free agency for the eventual champion Miami Heat, effectively ending the Big 3 era in Boston. During his 2 years with the Heat, Allen would help them win a second-straight title the following year over the San Antonio Spurs in seven games, and appear again in the 2014 Finals against the same Spurs team.

It was also the NBA's first time without Shaquille O'Neal since 1991–92, as he retired in May 2011 and played his final season as a Celtic.

== Key dates ==
- June 23: The 2011 NBA draft took place at Prudential Center in Newark, New Jersey.
- December 25: The regular season begins with a matchup against the New York Knicks in a rematch from the previous season's playoffs.
- April 18: The Celtics secure the Atlantic Division title in a 102–98 win against the Orlando Magic.
- April 29: The 2012 NBA Playoffs started.
- May 10: The Celtics advanced to the Eastern Conference Semi-Finals, defeating the Atlanta Hawks.
- May 25: The Celtics advanced to the Eastern Conference finals, defeating the Philadelphia 76ers
- June 9: The Celtics were defeated by the Miami Heat and were eliminated from the NBA Playoffs.

== Draft picks ==
Round	Pick	Player	Position	Nationality	College/Club Team
1	27	JaJuan Johnson (traded from the New Jersey Nets)	PF	United States	Purdue
2	55	E'Twaun Moore	SG	United States	Purdue

== Roster ==
2011–12 Boston Celtics roster
Players

Pos.	No.	Player	Height	Weight	DOB	From
SG	20	Ray Allen	6 ft 5 in (1.96 m)	205 lb (93 kg)	July 20, 1975	Connecticut
PF	30	Brandon Bass	6 ft 8 in (2.03 m)	250 lb (113 kg)	April 30, 1985	LSU
G	0	Avery Bradley	6 ft 3 in (1.91 m)	180 lb (82 kg)	November 26, 1990	Texas
G/F	4	Marquis Daniels	6 ft 6 in (1.98 m)	200 lb (91 kg)	January 7, 1981	Auburn
G	51	Keyon Dooling	6 ft 3 in (1.91 m)	195 lb (88 kg)	May 8, 1980	Missouri
F/C	5	Kevin Garnett	6 ft 11 in (2.11 m)	253 lb (115 kg)	May 19, 1976	Farragut Academy (IL)
F	8	Jeff Green	6 ft 9 in (2.06 m)	235 lb (107 kg)	1986–08–28	Georgetown
C	50	Ryan Hollins	7 ft 0 in (2.13 m)	240 lb (109 kg)	October 10, 1984	UCLA
PF	12	JaJuan Johnson	6 ft 10 in (2.08 m)	221 lb (100 kg)	February 8, 1989	Purdue
G	55	E'Twaun Moore	6 ft 4 in (1.93 m)	191 lb (87 kg)	February 25, 1989	Purdue
SF	11	Aleksandar Pavlović	6 ft 7 in (2.01 m)	235 lb (107 kg)	November 15, 1983	Montenegro
F	34	Paul Pierce	6 ft 7 in (2.01 m)	235 lb (107 kg)	October 13, 1977	Kansas
G/F	28	Mickaël Piétrus	6 ft 6 in (1.98 m)	215 lb (98 kg)	February 7, 1982	Guadeloupe
PG	9	Rajon Rondo	6 ft 1 in (1.85 m)	186 lb (84 kg)	February 22, 1986	Kentucky
C	54	Greg Stiemsma	6 ft 11 in (2.11 m)	260 lb (118 kg)	September 26, 1985	Wisconsin
F/C	56	Sean Williams	6 ft 10 in (2.08 m)	235 lb (107 kg)	September 13, 1986	Boston College

Coaches
Head coach
- Doc Rivers
Assistant(s)
- Kevin Eastman
- Armond Hill
- Mike Longabardi
- Tyronn Lue
- Jamie Young

Legend
- (DP) Unsigned draft pick
- (FA) Free agent
- (S) Suspended
- (DL) On assignment to D-League affiliate
- Injured

Roster
Updated: October 28, 2012

=== Roster notes ===
- Forward Jeff Green missed the entire season due to recovery from a heart surgery.

== Pre-season ==
=== Game log ===
2011 pre-season game log
Pre-season: 2–0 (home: 1–0; road: 1–0)

Game	Date	Team	Score	High points	High rebounds	High assists	Location Attendance	Record
1	December 18	@ Toronto	W 76–75	Ray Allen (12)	Kevin Garnett (7)	Rajon Rondo (8)	Air Canada Centre; 16,721	1–0
2	December 21	Toronto	W 81–73	Rajon Rondo (12)	Ray Allen (6)	Rajon Rondo (6)	TD Garden; 18.624	2–0

2011–12 season schedule

== Regular season ==
=== Standings ===
Atlantic Division	W	L	PCT	GB	Home	Road	Div	GP
y-Boston Celtics	39	27	.591	–	24–9	15–18	8–6	66
x-New York Knicks	36	30	.545	3	22–11	14–19	8–6	66
x-Philadelphia 76ers	35	31	.530	4	19–14	16–17	7–6	66
Toronto Raptors	23	43	.348	16	13–20	10–23	7–8	66
New Jersey Nets	22	44	.333	17	9–24	13–20	5–9	66

Eastern Conference
#	Team	W	L	PCT	GB	GP
1	z-Chicago Bulls	50	16	.758	–	66
2	y-Miami Heat *	46	20	.697	4.0	66
3	x-Indiana Pacers *	42	24	.636	8.0	66
4	y-Boston Celtics	39	27	.591	11.0	66
5	x-Atlanta Hawks	40	26	.606	10.0	66
6	x-Orlando Magic	37	29	.561	13.0	66
7	x-New York Knicks	36	30	.545	14.0	66
8	x-Philadelphia 76ers	35	31	.530	15.0	66
9	Milwaukee Bucks	31	35	.470	19.0	66
10	Detroit Pistons	25	41	.379	25.0	66
11	Toronto Raptors	23	43	.348	27.0	66
12	New Jersey Nets	22	44	.333	28.0	66
13	Cleveland Cavaliers	21	45	.318	29.0	66
14	Washington Wizards	20	46	.303	30.0	66
15	Charlotte Bobcats	7	59	.106	43.0	66

=== Game log ===
2011–12 game log
Total: 39–27 (home: 24–9; road: 15–18)
December: 1–3 (home: 1–0; road: 0–3)

Game	Date	Team	Score	High points	High rebounds	High assists	Location Attendance	Record
1	December 25	@ New York	L 104–106	Rajon Rondo (31)	Brandon Bass (11)	Rajon Rondo (13)	Madison Square Garden; 19,763	0–1
2	December 27	@ Miami	L 108–115	Ray Allen (28)	Rajon Rondo (8)	Rajon Rondo (12)	American Airlines Arena; 20,166	0–2
3	December 28	@ New Orleans	L 78–97	Ray Allen (15)	Kevin Garnett (7)	Rajon Rondo (12)	New Orleans Arena; 17,802	0–3
4	December 30	Detroit	W 96–85	Jermaine O'Neal (17)	Jermaine O'Neal (7)	Paul Pierce (5)	TD Garden; 18,624	1–3

January : 9–7 (home: 5–6; road: 4–1)

Game	Date	Team	Score	High points	High rebounds	High assists	Location Attendance	Record
5	January 1	@ Washington	W 94–86	Kevin Garnett (24)	Rajon Rondo (11)	Rajon Rondo (14)	Verizon Center; 17,458	2–3
6	January 2	Washington	W 100–92	Ray Allen (27)	Paul Pierce (8)	Rajon Rondo (13)	TD Garden; 18,624	3–3
7	January 4	New Jersey	W 89–70	Paul Pierce (24)	Kevin Garnett (12)	Rajon Rondo (12)	TD Garden; 18,624	4–3
8	January 6	Indiana	L 74–87	Ray Allen (23)	Paul Pierce, Jermaine O'Neal (7)	Rajon Rondo (9)	TD Garden; 18,624	4–4
9	January 11	Dallas	L 85–90	Rajon Rondo (24)	Kevin Garnett (10)	Rajon Rondo (7)	TD Garden; 18,624	4–5
10	January 13	Chicago	L 79–88	Ray Allen (16)	Brandon Bass (9)	Rajon Rondo (11)	TD Garden; 18,624	4–6
11	January 14	@ Indiana	L 83–97	Paul Pierce (21)	Jermaine O'Neal (12)	Rajon Rondo (9)	Bankers Life Fieldhouse; 14,203	4–7
12	January 16	Oklahoma City	L 88–97	Paul Pierce (24)	Kevin Garnett (12)	Rajon Rondo (9)	TD Garden; 18,624	4–8
13	January 18	Toronto	W 96–73	Rajon Rondo (21)	Brandon Bass (9)	Paul Pierce (7)	TD Garden; 18,624	5–8
14	January 20	Phoenix	L 71–79	Ray Allen (14)	Ray Allen, Brandon Bass (6)	Paul Pierce (6)	TD Garden; 18,624	5–9
15	January 22	@ Washington	W 100–94	Paul Pierce (34)	Brandon Bass (9)	Paul Pierce (10)	Verizon Center; 15,818	6–9
16	January 23	Orlando	W 87–56	Paul Pierce, Brandon Bass (19)	Kevin Garnett (10)	Paul Pierce (7)	TD Garden; 18,624	7–9
17	January 26	@ Orlando	W 91–83	Paul Pierce (24)	Kevin Garnett (10)	Paul Pierce (10)	Amway Center; 18,952	8–9
18	January 27	Indiana	W 94–87	Paul Pierce (28)	Paul Pierce (10)	Paul Pierce (8)	TD Garden; 18,624	9–9
19	January 29	Cleveland	L 87–88	Ray Allen (22)	Kevin Garnett (7)	Paul Pierce (5)	TD Garden; 18,624	9–10
20	January 31	@ Cleveland	W 93–90	Paul Pierce (20)	Brandon Bass (6)	Ray Allen (8)	Quicken Loans Arena; 14,798	10–10

February : 7–7 (home: 6–2; road: 1–5)

Game	Date	Team	Score	High points	High rebounds	High assists	Location Attendance	Record
21	February 1	Toronto	W 100–64	Paul Pierce (17)	Brandon Bass (9)	Paul Pierce (8)	TD Garden; 18,624	11–10
22	February 3	New York	W 91–89	Paul Pierce (30)	Kevin Garnett (8)	Rajon Rondo (7)	TD Garden; 18,624	12–10
23	February 5	Memphis	W 98–80	Kevin Garnett (24)	Kevin Garnett (9)	Rajon Rondo (14)	TD Garden; 18,624	13–10
24	February 7	Charlotte	W 94–84	Kevin Garnett (22)	Paul Pierce, Jermaine O'Neal (8)	Rajon Rondo (14)	TD Garden; 18,624	14–10
25	February 9	L. A. Lakers	L 87–88	Ray Allen (22)	Kevin Garnett (12)	Paul Pierce, Rajon Rondo (7)	TD Garden; 18,624	14–11
26	February 10	@ Toronto	L 74–86	Kevin Garnett (17)	Kevin Garnett (8)	Rajon Rondo (7)	Air Canada Centre; 19,207	14–12
27	February 12	Chicago	W 95–91	Rajon Rondo (32)	Kevin Garnett (12)	Rajon Rondo (15)	TD Garden; 18,624	15–12
28	February 15	Detroit	L 88–98	Rajon Rondo (35)	Chris Wilcox (9)	Rajon Rondo (6)	TD Garden; 18,624	15–13
29	February 16	@ Chicago	L 80–89	Kevin Garnett (18)	Kevin Garnett (10)	Rajon Rondo (8)	United Center; 22,592	15–14
30	February 19	@ Detroit	L 81–96	Paul Pierce (18)	Jermaine O'Neal (11)	Rajon Rondo (10)	The Palace of Auburn Hills; 22,076	15–15
31	February 20	@ Dallas	L 73–89	Paul Pierce (20)	Mickaël Piétrus (12)	Mickaël Piétrus (4)	American Airlines Center; 20,364	15–16
32	February 22	@ Oklahoma City	L 104–119	Paul Pierce, Kevin Garnett (23)	Kevin Garnett (13)	Paul Pierce (8)	Chesapeake Energy Arena; 18,203	15–17
All-Star Break
33	February 28	@ Cleveland	W 86–83	Ray Allen (22)	Chris Wilcox (11)	Rajon Rondo (11)	Quicken Loans Arena; 15,971	16–17
34	February 29	Milwaukee	W 102–96	Kevin Garnett (25)	Chris Wilcox (13)	Rajon Rondo (10)	TD Garden; 18,624	17–17

March : 12–5 (home: 6–0; road: 6–5)

Game	Date	Team	Score	High points	High rebounds	High assists	Location Attendance	Record
35	March 2	New Jersey	W 107–94	Paul Pierce (27)	Kevin Garnett (10)	Rajon Rondo (13)	TD Garden; 18,624	18–17
36	March 4	New York	W 115–111	Paul Pierce (34)	Rajon Rondo (17)	Rajon Rondo (20)	TD Garden; 18,624	19–17
37	March 6	Houston	W 97–92	Paul Pierce (30)	Kevin Garnett (13)	Rajon Rondo (12)	TD Garden; 18,624	20–17
38	March 7	@ Philadelphia	L 71–103	Paul Pierce (16)	Kevin Garnett, JaJuan Johnson (13)	Rajon Rondo (8)	Wells Fargo Center; 18,508	20–18
39	March 9	Portland	W 104–86	Paul Pierce; Ray Allen (22)	Kevin Garnett (8)	Rajon Rondo; Avery Bradley (5)	TD Garden; 18,624	21–18
40	March 11	@ L. A. Lakers	L 94–97	Rajon Rondo (24)	Kevin Garnett (11)	Rajon Rondo (10)	Staples Center; 18,997	21–19
41	March 12	@ L. A. Clippers	W 94–85	Paul Pierce (25)	Brandon Bass (9)	Rajon Rondo (10)	Staples Center; 19,464	22–19
42	March 14	@ Golden State	W 105–103	Kevin Garnett (24)	Brandon Bass (9)	Rajon Rondo (14)	Oracle Arena; 19,596	23–19
43	March 16	@ Sacramento	L 95–120	Ray Allen (26)	Kevin Garnett (9)	Rajon Rondo (12)	Power Balance Pavilion; 17,317	23–20
44	March 17	@ Denver	L 91–98	Paul Pierce; Kevin Garnett (22)	Kevin Garnett (9)	Rajon Rondo (16)	Pepsi Center; 19,003	23–21
45	March 19	@ Atlanta	W 79–76	Ray Allen (19)	Brandon Bass (10)	Rajon Rondo (13)	Philips Arena; 16,412	24–21
46	March 22	@ Milwaukee	W 100–91	Paul Pierce (25)	Brandon Bass; Kevin Garnett (10)	Rajon Rondo (14)	Bradley Center; 15,171	25–21
47	March 23	@ Philadelphia	L 86–99	Kevin Garnett; Paul Pierce (20)	Paul Pierce (9)	Rajon Rondo (17)	Wells Fargo Center; 19,583	25–22
48	March 25	Washington	W 88–76	Avery Bradley (23)	Paul Pierce (8)	Rajon Rondo (11)	TD Garden; 18,624	26–22
49	March 26	@ Charlotte	W 102–95	Paul Pierce (36)	Paul Pierce (10)	Rajon Rondo (13)	Time Warner Cable Arena; 16,357	27–22
50	March 28	Utah	W 94–82	Kevin Garnett (23)	Kevin Garnett (10)	Rajon Rondo (14)	TD Garden; 18,624	28–22
51	March 30	@ Minnesota	W 100–79	Kevin Garnett (24)	Kevin Garnett (10)	Rajon Rondo (17)	Target Center; 19356	29–22

April : 10–5 (home: 6–1; road: 4–4)

Game	Date	Team	Score	High points	High rebounds	High assists	Location Attendance	Record
52	April 1	Miami	W 91–72	Paul Pierce (23)	Rajon Rondo (11)	Rajon Rondo (14)	TD Garden; 18,624	30–22
53	April 4	San Antonio	L 86–87	Avery Bradley (19)	Paul Pierce (10)	Rajon Rondo (11)	TD Garden; 18,624	30–23
54	April 5	@ Chicago	L 86–93	Paul Pierce (22)	Kevin Garnett (14)	Rajon Rondo (12)	United Center; 22,423	30–24
55	April 7	@ Indiana	W 86–72	Paul Pierce (24)	Greg Stiemsma (9)	Rajon Rondo (12)	Bankers Life Fieldhouse; 16,892	31–24
56	April 8	Philadelphia	W 103–79	Kevin Garnett (20)	Brandon Bass, Kevin Garnett, Sasha Pavlovic (6)	Rajon Rondo (15)	TD Garden; 18,624	32–24
57	April 10	@ Miami	W 115–107	Paul Pierce (27)	Brandon Bass (10)	Rajon Rondo (15)	American Airlines Arena; 19,954	33–24
58	April 11	Atlanta	W 88–86	Kevin Garnett (22)	Kevin Garnett (12)	Rajon Rondo (20)	TD Garden; 18,624	34–24
59	April 13	@ Toronto	L 79–84	Paul Pierce (18)	Kevin Garnett (10)	Rajon Rondo (12)	Air Canada Centre; 17,270	34–25
60	April 14	@ New Jersey	W 94–82	Kevin Garnett (21)	Kevin Garnett (12)	Rajon Rondo (15)	Prudential Center; 18,711	35–25
61	April 15	@ Charlotte	W 94–82	Brandon Bass, Avery Bradley (22)	Brandon Bass (9)	Rajon Rondo (16)	Time Warner Cable Arena; 15,169	36–25
62	April 17	@ New York	L 110–118	Paul Pierce (43)	Brandon Bass, Rajon Rondo (6)	Rajon Rondo (13)	Madison Square Garden; 19,763	36–26
63	April 18	Orlando	W 102–98	Paul Pierce (29)	Kevin Garnett (9)	Paul Pierce (14)	TD Garden; 18,624	37–26
64	April 20	@ Atlanta	L 92–97	Avery Bradley (28)	Marquis Daniels (8)	Sasha Pavlovic, Brandon Bass, Keyon Dooling, Avery Bradley, Marquis Daniels (3)	Philips Arena	37–27
65	April 24	Miami	W 78–66	Sasha Pavlovic (16)	Brandon Bass (8)	Marquis Daniels (4)	TD Garden; 18,624	38–27
66	April 26	Milwaukee	W 87–74	Avery Bradley (14)	Brandon Bass (9)	Rajon Rondo (15)	TD Garden; 18,624	39–27

2011–12 season schedule

== Playoffs ==
=== Game log ===
2012 playoff game log
First round: 4–2 (home: 3–0; road: 1–2)

Game	Date	Team	Score	High points	High rebounds	High assists	Location Attendance	Series
1	April 29	@ Atlanta	L 74–83	Kevin Garnett; Rajon Rondo (20)	Kevin Garnett (12)	Rajon Rondo (11)	Philips Arena; 19,292	0–1
2	May 1	@ Atlanta	W 87–80	Paul Pierce (36)	Paul Pierce (14)	Kevin Garnett (5)	Philips Arena; 19,292	1–1
3	May 4	Atlanta	W 90–84 (OT)	Paul Pierce (21)	Rajon Rondo (14)	Rajon Rondo (12)	TD Garden; 18,624	2–1
4	May 6	Atlanta	W 101–79	Paul Pierce (24)	Kevin Garnett; Ray Allen; Brandon Bass (5)	Rajon Rondo (16)	TD Garden; 18,624	3–1
5	May 8	@ Atlanta	L 86–87	Paul Pierce (16)	Kevin Garnett; Brandon Bass (7)	Rajon Rondo (12)	Philips Arena; 19,292	3–2
6	May 10	Atlanta	W 83–80	Kevin Garnett (28)	Kevin Garnett (14)	Rajon Rondo (8)	TD Garden; 18,624	4–2

Conference semifinals: 4–3 (home: 3–1; road: 1–2)

Game	Date	Team	Score	High points	High rebounds	High assists	Location Attendance	Series
1	May 12	Philadelphia	W 92–91	Kevin Garnett (24)	Rajon Rondo (12)	Rajon Rondo (17)	TD Garden; 18,624	1–0
2	May 14	Philadelphia	L 81–82	Ray Allen (17)	Kevin Garnett (12)	Rajon Rondo (13)	TD Garden; 18,624	1–1
3	May 16	@ Philadelphia	W 107–91	Kevin Garnett (27)	Kevin Garnett (13)	Rajon Rondo (14)	Wells Fargo Center; 20,351	2–1
4	May 18	@ Philadelphia	L 83–92	Paul Pierce (24)	Kevin Garnett (11)	Rajon Rondo (15)	Wells Fargo Center; 20,411	2–2
5	May 21	Philadelphia	W 101–85	Brandon Bass (27)	Kevin Garnett; Brandon Bass (6)	Rajon Rondo (14)	TD Garden; 18,624	3–2
6	May 23	@ Philadelphia	L 75–82	Paul Pierce (24)	Kevin Garnett (11)	Rajon Rondo (6)	Wells Fargo Center; 20,403	3–3
7	May 26	Philadelphia	W 85–75	Kevin Garnett; Rajon Rondo (18)	Kevin Garnett (13)	Rajon Rondo (10)	TD Garden; 18,624	4–3

Conference finals: 3–4 (home: 2–1; road: 1–3)

Game	Date	Team	Score	High points	High rebounds	High assists	Location Attendance	Series
1	May 28	@ Miami	L 79–93	Kevin Garnett (23)	Kevin Garnett (10)	Rajon Rondo (7)	American Airlines Arena; 19,912	0–1
2	May 30	@ Miami	L 111–115 (OT)	Rajon Rondo (44)	Brandon Bass (10)	Rajon Rondo (10)	American Airlines Arena; 19,973	0–2
3	June 1	Miami	W 101–91	Kevin Garnett (24)	Kevin Garnett (11)	Rajon Rondo (10)	TD Garden; 18,624	1–2
4	June 3	Miami	W 93–91 (OT)	Paul Pierce (23)	Kevin Garnett (14)	Rajon Rondo (15)	TD Garden; 18,624	2–2
5	June 5	@ Miami	W 94–90	Kevin Garnett (26)	Kevin Garnett (11)	Rajon Rondo (13)	American Airlines Arena; 20,021	3–2
6	June 7	Miami	L 79–98	Rajon Rondo (21)	Brandon Bass (7)	Rajon Rondo (10)	TD Garden; 18,624	3–3
7	June 9	@ Miami	L 88–101	Rajon Rondo (22)	Rajon Rondo (10)	Rajon Rondo (14)	American Airlines Arena; 20,114	3–4

2012 playoff schedule

== Player statistics ==
Legend
GP	Games played	GS	Games started	MPG	Minutes per game
FG%	Field-goal percentage	3P%	3-point field-goal percentage	FT%	Free-throw percentage
RPG	Rebounds per game	APG	Assists per game	SPG	Steals per game
BPG	Blocks per game	PPG	Points per game

=== Season ===
Boston Celtics statistics
Player	GP	GS	MPG	FG%	3P%	FT%	RPG	APG	SPG	BPG	PPG
Ray Allen	46	42	34.0	.458	.453	.915	3.1	2.4	1.1	.2	14.2
Brandon Bass	59	39	31.7	.479		.810	6.2	.9	.6	.9	12.5
Avery Bradley	64	28	21.4	.498	.407	.795	1.8	1.4	.7	.2	7.6
Marquis Daniels	38	0	12.7	.364	.000	.739	1.7	1.2	.6	.2	3.2
Keyon Dooling	46	2	14.4	.405	.333	.742	0.8	1.1	.3	.0	4.0
Kevin Garnett	60	60	31.1	.503	.333	.857	8.2	2.9	.9	1.0	15.8
Ryan Hollins^{[1]}	15	1	10.7	.643		.300	1.7	.2	.1	.3	2.8
JaJuan Johnson	36	0	8.3	.446		.667	1.6	.2	.1	.4	3.2
E'Twaun Moore	38	0	8.7	.381	.378	1.000	.9	.9	.3	.1	2.9
Jermaine O'Neal^{[1]}	25	24	22.8	.433		.677	5.4	.4	.3	1.7	5.0
Sasha Pavlović	45	7	11.7	.391	.293	.375	1.6	.4	.4	.3	2.7
Paul Pierce	61	61	34.0	.443	.366	.852	5.2	4.5	1.1	.4	19.4
Mickaël Piétrus	42	6	21.9	.385	.335	.645	3.1	.6	.5	.2	6.9
Rajon Rondo	53	53	36.9	.448	.238	.597	4.8	11.7	1.8	.1	11.9
Greg Stiemsma	55	3	13.9	.545		.707	3.2	.5	.7	1.5	2.9
Chris Wilcox^{[1]}	28	4	17.2	.598		.615	4.4	.4	.4	.3	5.4
Sean Williams^{[1]}	3	0	14.0	.333		1.000	4.0	1.0	1.0	1.0	3.7

- ^{1} Statistics with the Boston Celtics.

== Awards, records and milestones ==
- Paul Pierce was named Eastern Conference Player of the Week twice (January 30 – February 5 and March 26 – April 1).
- Kevin Garnett was named Eastern Conference Player of the Week (April 9 – 15).
- Paul Pierce and Rajon Rondo participated in the 2012 NBA All-Star Game. It was their 10th and 3rd appearance respectively.
- On March 22 Paul Pierce surpassed Clyde Drexler on the All-time scoring leaders table in a 100–91 win against the Milwaukee Bucks.

== Injuries and suspensions ==
- Jeff Green was not available for the 2011–12 season due to recovery from a heart surgery.
- Chris Wilcox was out for the season in March with a cardiac irregularity.
- Jermaine O'Neal was out for the season on March to have surgery on his left wrist.
- Rajon Rondo earned a two-game suspension for throwing the ball to a referee during a game against the Detroit Pistons on February 19 and was suspended for one game during the playoffs for bumping a referee on game 1 of the first round against the Atlanta Hawks.

== Transactions ==
=== Overview ===
Players Added

Via draft

- JaJuan Johnson
- E'Twaun Moore

Via free agency

- Marquis Daniels
- Ryan Hollins
- Mickaël Piétrus
- Greg Stiemsma
- Chris Wilcox
- Sean Williams

Via trade

- Brandon Bass
- Keyon Dooling
Players Lost

Via trade

- Glen Davis
- Von Wafer

Via free agency

- Carlos Arroyo
- Nenad Krstić
- Troy Murphy
- Delonte West

Negated Contract due to Injury

- Jeff Green

Waived

- Jermaine O'Neal
- Chris Wilcox

Retired

- Shaquille O'Neal

=== Trades ===
June 23, 2011	To Boston Celtics Draft rights to JaJuan Johnson; Conditional 2014 second-round pick	To New Jersey Nets Draft rights to MarShon Brooks
December 9, 2011	To Boston Celtics Keyon Dooling; Conditional 2012 second-round pick	To Milwaukee Bucks Draft rights to Albert Miralles
December 12, 2011	To Boston Celtics Brandon Bass	To Orlando Magic Glen Davis (sign and trade); Von Wafer (sign and trade)

=== Free agents ===
Additions
Player	Date signed	Former team
Marquis Daniels	December 9	Sacramento Kings
Chris Wilcox	December 9	Detroit Pistons
Greg Stiemsma	December 9	Sioux Falls Skyforce (D-League)
Aleksandar Pavlović	December 12	Re-signed
Mickaël Piétrus	December 24	Phoenix Suns
Ryan Hollins	March 23	Cleveland Cavaliers
Sean Williams	April 20	Dallas Mavericks

Subtractions
Player	Date signed	New team
Nenad Krstić	June 22	CSKA Moscow (Russia)
Glen Davis	December 12	Orlando Magic
Von Wafer	December 12	Orlando Magic
Delonte West	December 13	Dallas Mavericks
Troy Murphy	December 18	Los Angeles Lakers
Carlos Arroyo	December 22	Beşiktaş Milangaz (Turkey)

Many players signed with teams from other leagues due to the 2011 NBA lockout. FIBA allows players under NBA contracts to sign and play for teams from other leagues if the contracts have opt-out clauses that allow the players to return to the NBA if the lockout ends. The Chinese Basketball Association, however, only allows its clubs to sign foreign free agents who could play for at least the entire season.

Played in other leagues during lockout
Player	Date signed	New team	Opt-out clause
Nenad Krstić	June 22	CSKA Moscow (Russia)	No
E'Twaun Moore	July 28	Benetton Treviso (Italy)	Yes
Von Wafer	August 3	Vanoli Cremona (Italy)	Yes
Avery Bradley	October 5	Hapoel Jerusalem (Israel)	No

== See also ==
- 2011–12 NBA season
- Uncut Gems, a 2019 film by the Safdie brothers starring Adam Sandler, set around the 2012 conference semi-finals; features Kevin Garnett as himself, with archival footage of Games 5–7.
