= Aleksandar Pavlović (basketball) =

Montenegrin basketball player (born 1983)

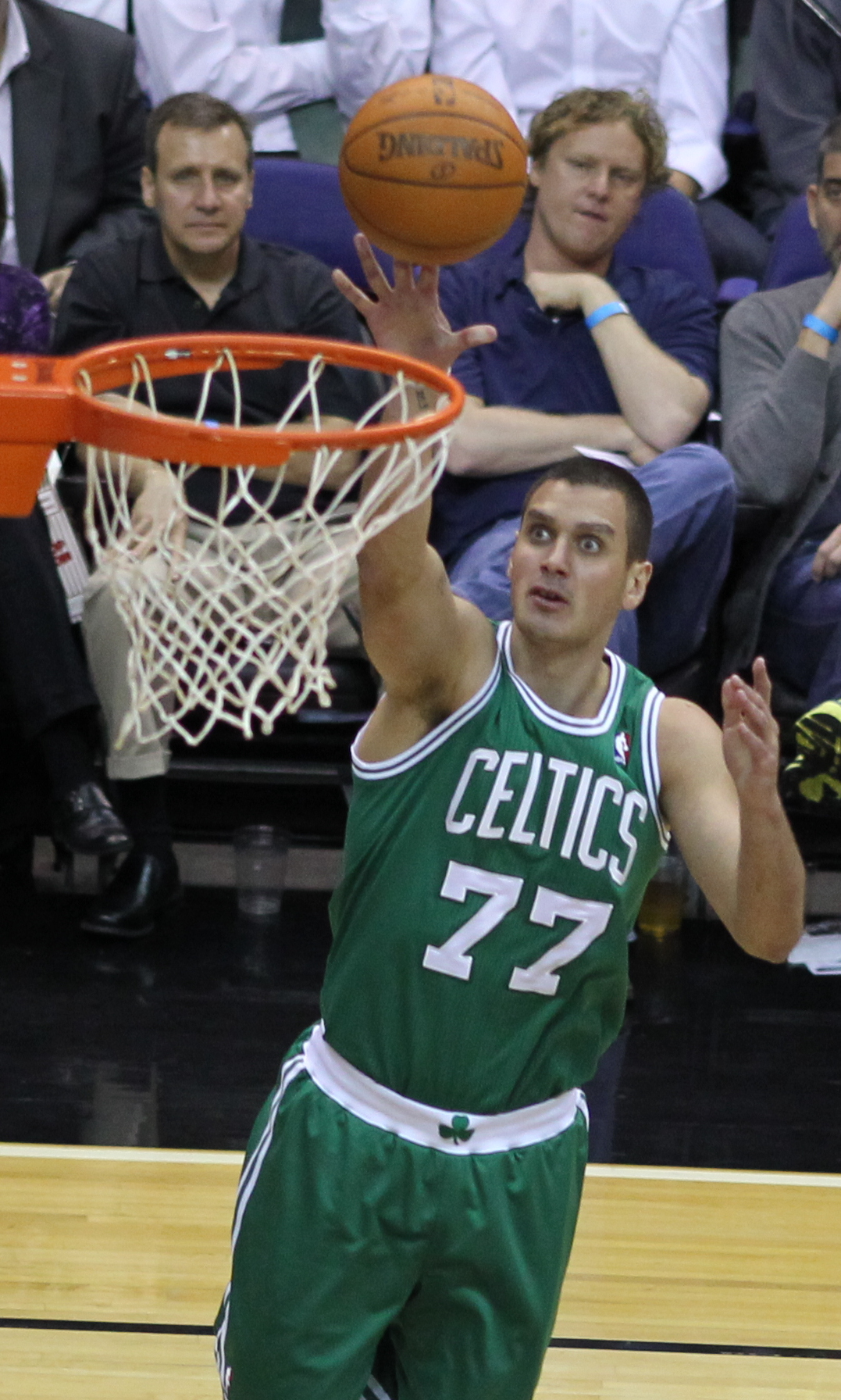
- Pavlović with the Boston Celtics in 2011

Partizan Mozzart Bet
- Title: Board member
- League: KLS; ABA League; EuroLeague

Personal information
- Born: November 15, 1983 (age 42) Bar, SR Montenegro, SFR Yugoslavia
- Listed height: 6 ft 7 in (2.01 m)
- Listed weight: 235 lb (107 kg)

Career information
- NBA draft: 2003: 1st round, 19th overall pick
- Drafted by: Utah Jazz
- Playing career: 2000–2016
- Position: Small forward / shooting guard
- Number: 3, 7, 8, 11, 77

Career history
- 2000–2003: Budućnost Podgorica
- 2003–2004: Utah Jazz
- 2004–2009: Cleveland Cavaliers
- 2009–2010: Minnesota Timberwolves
- 2011: Dallas Mavericks
- 2011: New Orleans Hornets
- 2011–2012: Boston Celtics
- 2012–2013: Portland Trail Blazers
- 2013–2015: Partizan
- 2015–2016: Panathinaikos

Career highlights
- Serbian League champion (2014); Yugoslavian League champion (2001); Greek Cup winner (2016); All-ABA League Team (2015)
- Stats at NBA.com
- Stats at Basketball Reference

Aleksandar "Saša" Pavlović (Anglicized: Sasha Pavlovic, Serbian Cyrillic: Александар "Саша" Павловић; born November 15, 1983) is a Serbian-Montenegrin basketball executive and former professional player who spent ten seasons in the National Basketball Association (NBA), playing for the Utah Jazz, Cleveland Cavaliers, Minnesota Timberwolves, Dallas Mavericks, New Orleans Pelicans, Boston Celtics and the Portland Trail Blazers. He also represented the national basketball team of Serbia and Montenegro internationally. Standing at 6 ft 7 in (2.01 m), he played the small forward and shooting guard positions.

== Professional career ==
=== Budućnost Podgorica (2000–2003) ===
In his first professional season for Budućnost, Pavlović played in 14 games in the YUBA League and averaged 1.4 points per game. In his second season, Pavlović played in three games in the YUBA League and averaged 6.7 points. Also, Pavlović played two games in the EuroLeague.

In his last season in Podgorica, Pavlović played in 20 games in the YUBA League and averaged 10.1 points and 2.4 rebounds per game. Pavlović averaged 9.6 points on 54% shooting for Budućnost in the EuroLeague, including a season-high 21 points against Tau Ceramica.

=== Utah Jazz (2003–2004) ===
Pavlović was selected by the Utah Jazz with the 19th pick in the 2003 NBA draft. His American agent Marc Cornstein issued a clarification in response to a misleading Eurobasket.com biography mixing Aleksandar Pavlović with an 'Aleksander Pavlović' who played college basketball at La Salle University and Shippensburg University of Pennsylvania.

In 79 games played (14 starts), Pavlović averaged 4.8 points and 2.0 rebounds. He scored a season-high 18 points on December 3, 2003, against the Houston Rockets and grabbed nine rebounds on two occasions.

=== Cleveland Cavaliers (2004–2009) ===
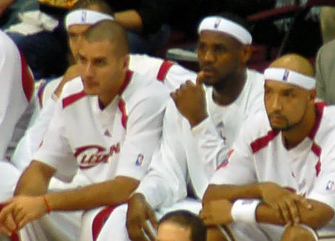
Pavlović (left) with the Cavaliers alongside LeBron James and Drew Gooden in 2006

Pavlović was selected by the Charlotte Bobcats in the expansion draft on June 22, 2004, and was traded to the Cleveland Cavaliers for a 2007 first-round draft pick the next day. In 65 games played (nine starts), Pavlović averaged 4.8 points and 1.1 rebounds. He scored a season high 17 points on two occasions and scored in double digits on nine occasions.

In 53 games of the 2005–06 season, he started 19 times and averaged 4.5 points and 1.5 rebounds. He scored a season high 21 points on February 21, 2006, against the Orlando Magic. Pavlović played three minutes over three playoff games and recorded only one rebound.

In 67 games played (28 starts) in 2006–07, Pavlović averaged a career-high 9.0 points, along with 2.4 rebounds and 1.6 assists. He scored 20 points or more on seven occasions, including a new career-high 25 points on March 13, 2007, against the Sacramento Kings. Approximately two weeks later, Pavlović had a career-high six three-point field goals made (of 7 attempts) against the New York Knicks. After occasional starts in the beginning of 2007, Pavlović was installed as the Cavaliers' starting shooting guard on March 1, 2007, and started the remaining 24 regular season games. As a starter, Pavlović averaged 12.7 points, 3.0 rebounds and 2.3 assists.

Pavlović started all 20 of Cavaliers' 2007 playoff games. He had playoff highs of 17 points in a game 2 victory over the New Jersey Nets in the Eastern Conference Semifinals and nine rebounds in a game 5 overtime victory over the Detroit Pistons in the Eastern Conference Finals.

In the 2007 offseason Pavlović was a restricted free agent. On October 30, 2007, after nearly a month's holdout he signed a three-year, $13.7 million extension with the Cavaliers. Pavlović injured his left foot on January 23, 2008, in a game against the Washington Wizards. He returned against the New Jersey Nets on March 12. He started but was held scoreless in 9 minutes of action. On March 14, Pavlović had a season-high 24 points on against the Washington Wizards. He and scored double-digit points in 15 total games.

During the 2007–08 season, Pavlović played in 51 games (45 starts) and averaged 7.4 points, a career-high 2.5 rebounds and a career high 1.6 assists. In eight playoff games, he averaged 3.5 points and 1.3 rebounds.

In the following 2008–09 season, the Cavaliers were beaten by the Orlando Magic in the 2009 Eastern Conference Finals, 4 games to 2. Pavlović became trade bait as talks with the Phoenix Suns were rekindled from earlier in the season and on June 25, 2009, he, Ben Wallace, and the 46th overall pick were traded to Phoenix for future teammate Shaquille O'Neal. On September 14, 2009, he was bought out by the Suns.

While playing for the Cavaliers, he bought a BMW car from LeBron James. There was an urban legend in Serbia that Pavlović won the car after beating him in one-on-one match, but Pavlović told in an interview that no such match was played. In another interview on January 2, 2020, he revealed that he still owns the car.

=== Minnesota Timberwolves (2009–2010) ===
On September 17, 2009, Pavlović signed a one-year, $1.5 million contract with the Minnesota Timberwolves. In 71 games, he averaged 3.7 points per game.

=== Multiple short stints (2010–2013) ===
On January 10, 2011, Pavlović signed a 10-day contract with the Dallas Mavericks. Pavlović started his first game for the Mavericks on the last day of his contract, scoring 11 points in the Mavericks' 109–100 win over the Lakers. On January 20, 2011, he signed a second 10-day contract with the Mavericks. On January 30, 2011, his second 10-day contract expired and the Mavericks did not sign him for the rest of the season.

On February 4, 2011, Pavlović signed a 10-day contract with the New Orleans Hornets. On February 14, 2011, his contract expired and the Hornets did not sign him to a second 10-day contract.

On March 3, 2011, Pavlović signed with the Boston Celtics for the rest of the 2010–11 season. In his first appearance with Boston on March 6, 2011, in a game against the Milwaukee Bucks, he played 12 minutes, going 1-for-2 from three and 1-for-3 field goals overall, recording 3 points and 2 steals.

His contract expired following the 2011 playoffs, and he returned to Montenegro to work out for the summer. On December 12, 2011, upon the end of the 2011 NBA lockout, Pavlović re-signed with the Celtics. The 2011–12 NBA season opened on Christmas Day 2011 and Pavlović started for an injured Paul Pierce. He played 15 minutes without attempting a shot or scoring a point. In the Celtics' second-last game of the season, a 78–66 win over the Heat, Pavlović scored 16 points off the bench. In 45 games (7 as starter), he averaged 2.7 points in 11.7 minutes per game.

On July 20, 2012, Pavlović was traded to the Portland Trail Blazers in a three-team deal.

Pavlović' final NBA game was played on April 17, 2013, in an 88–99 loss to the Golden State Warriors where he recorded 6 points and 1 rebound. On July 6, 2013, Pavlović was waived by the Trail Blazers.

=== Partizan Belgrade (2014–2015) ===
On February 10, 2014, Pavlović returned to Europe and officially signed with Serbian powerhouse Partizan for the rest of the 2013–14 season. Partizan finished season by winning its 13th consecutive domestic title, defeating arch rivals Red Star Belgrade by 3–1 in the final series. In the final series he averaged 11.7 points and 2.7 rebounds per game. Even though Pavlović was the most experienced player in the roster, it was his first championship win in his professional career. The day after the game, he said that winning a championship with Partizan was his greatest career accomplishment.

On December 1, 2014, Pavlović returned to Partizan and signed a contract for the rest of the season. In the ABA League debut in the new season, he led his team in an 89–80 victory over Mega Leks by scoring 26 points and having 4 rebounds and assists. Over 19 Adriatic League games, he averaged 11.9 points and 3.7 rebounds per game.

=== Panathinaikos (2015–2016) ===
On July 9, 2015, Pavlović signed a one-year contract with the Greek club Panathinaikos. On April 21, 2016, he was released by the club.

== International career ==
Pavlović was a member of the Serbia and Montenegro Under-20 national team and played at the 2002 European Under-20 Championships in Lithuania. He was a member of the Serbia and Montenegro national team at the 2004 Olympic Games, playing in four games, averaging 3.5 points and 1.8 rebounds. Two years later, Montenegro, his native country, declared independence from the State Union of Serbia and Montenegro. After that, Pavlović said that he would like to play for the Serbian national team. However, he did not play for the Serbian or the Montenegrin national team. When asked about a possible comeback in February 2014, he responded with: "I'm not thinking about the national team. To me, it became a political matter, not a sports matter. This is why I decided not to commit [to the national team]."

== Career statistics ==
Legend
GP	Games played	GS	Games started	MPG	Minutes per game
FG%	Field-goal percentage	3P%	3-point field-goal percentage	FT%	Free-throw percentage
RPG	Rebounds per game	APG	Assists per game	SPG	Steals per game
BPG	Blocks per game	PPG	Points per game	PIR	Performance index rating
**Bold**	Career high

=== NBA ===
==== Regular season ====
Year	Team	GP	GS	MPG	FG%	3P%	FT%	RPG	APG	SPG	BPG	PPG
2003–04	Utah	**79**	14	14.5	.396	.271	.774	2.0	.8	.5	.2	4.8
2004–05	Cleveland	65	9	13.3	.435	.385	.688	1.1	.8	.4	.1	4.8
2005–06	Cleveland	53	19	15.3	.410	.365	.653	1.5	.5	.4	.1	4.5
2006–07	Cleveland	67	28	22.9	.453	.405	**.794**	2.4	**1.6**	**.8**	.3	**9.0**
2007–08	Cleveland	51	**45**	**23.3**	.362	.298	.688	**2.5**	**1.6**	.6	.1	7.4
2008–09	Cleveland	66	12	16.0	.422	.410	.463	1.9	1.1	.3	.2	4.6
2009–10	Minnesota	71	0	12.4	.363	.297	.385	1.6	.8	.3	.1	3.7
2010–11	Dallas	10	6	16.3	.429	.438	.800	1.2	. 7	.5	.3	4.1
2010–11	New Orleans	4	1	12.5	.182	.000	.000	1.5	1.5	.0	**1.0**	1.0
2010–11	Boston	17	0	8.8	**.462**	**.500**	.400	.8	.2	.3	.0	1.8
2011–12	Boston	45	7	11.7	.391	.293	.375	1.6	.4	.4	.3	2.7
2012–13	Portland	39	1	13.5	.353	.300	.167	1.4	.8	.6	.1	2.6
**Career**		567	142	15.7	.404	.346	.673	1.8	.9	.5	.2	4.9

==== Playoffs ====
Year	Team	GP	GS	MPG	FG%	3P%	FT%	RPG	APG	SPG	BPG	PPG
2006	Cleveland	3	0	1.3	.000	.000	.000	.3	.0	.0	.0	.0
2007	Cleveland	**20**	**20**	**30.8**	.381	.345	.528	**2.6**	**1.6**	**1.0**	**.3**	**9.2**
2008	Cleveland	8	0	13.9	.385	**.444**	**.667**	1.3	.1	.3	.0	3.5
2009	Cleveland	11	0	8.3	**.500**	.250	.333	1.4	.4	.4	.0	2.1
2012	Boston	10	0	4.0	.333	.200	.000	.5	.1	.1	.1	.7
**Career**		52	20	16.6	.386	.333	.533	1.6	.7	.5	.1	4.6

=== EuroLeague ===
Year	Team	GP	GS	MPG	FG%	3P%	FT%	RPG	APG	SPG	BPG	PPG	PIR
2001–02	Budućnost	2	0	3.1	.000	.000	.000	.0	.0	.0	.0	.0	-2.0
2002–03	Budućnost	13	5	19.6	**.463**	.294	.640	1.4	1.0	.8	**.5**	9.7	7.0
2013–14	Partizan	7	4	**26.4**	.395	**.333**	**.818**	**3.3**	**1.7**	**1.1**	.0	**11.4**	**7.1**
2015–16	Panathinaikos	**25**	**17**	17.2	.397	.250	.632	2.6	1.1	.6	.3	5.6	4.2
**Career**		47	26	18.7	.415	.279	.662	2.2	1.1	.7	.3	7.4	5.1

== Post-playing career ==
In December 2018, Pavlović was named a board member of Partizan Belgrade under presidency of Ostoja Mijailović.

== Personal life ==
He is married to Dunja, with whom he has three children—Luka, Minja and Andrej. He is also the brother-in-law of Nikola Vučević. In 2016, Vučević married his longtime girlfriend, Nikoletta, the sister of Pavlovic. Sasha is the uncle of their three sons.

== See also ==
- List of European basketball players in the United States
- List of Montenegrin NBA players
- List of Serbian NBA players
