= Sasha =

Sacha, Sasha, or Sascha may refer to:

== People ==
- Sasha (name), includes list of people with the name and the variants Sascha or Sacha

=== Musicians ===
- Sacha (singer), born Sacha Visagie, Canadian singer and songwriter
- Sasha (DJ) (born 1969), born Alexander Coe
- Sasha (German singer) (born 1972), born Sascha Schmitz
- Sasha (Jamaican musician) (born 1974), gospel singer and former deejay, born Christine Chin

== Animals ==
- Sasha (dog) (2004–2008), a Labrador dog that served in the British Army
- Galianora sacha (G. sacha), Ecuadorian jumping spider
- "Sasha", name given to a frozen specimen of the extinct woolly rhinoceros

== Arts, entertainment, and media ==
- Sasha, a 2003 album by Sasha Gradiva
- Sasha (film), a 2022 Russian film
- Pour Sacha, a.k.a. For Sacha, 1991 film
- "Sascha … ein aufrechter Deutscher", a 1992 song by Die Toten Hosen from the album Kauf MICH!
- Sascha-Film, defunct Austrian film company

== Other uses ==
- Sasha-class minesweeper, NATO designated name, Soviet Navy minesweeper class

== See also ==
- Shasha (disambiguation)
