= Sascha Lienesch =

German politician (born 1978)

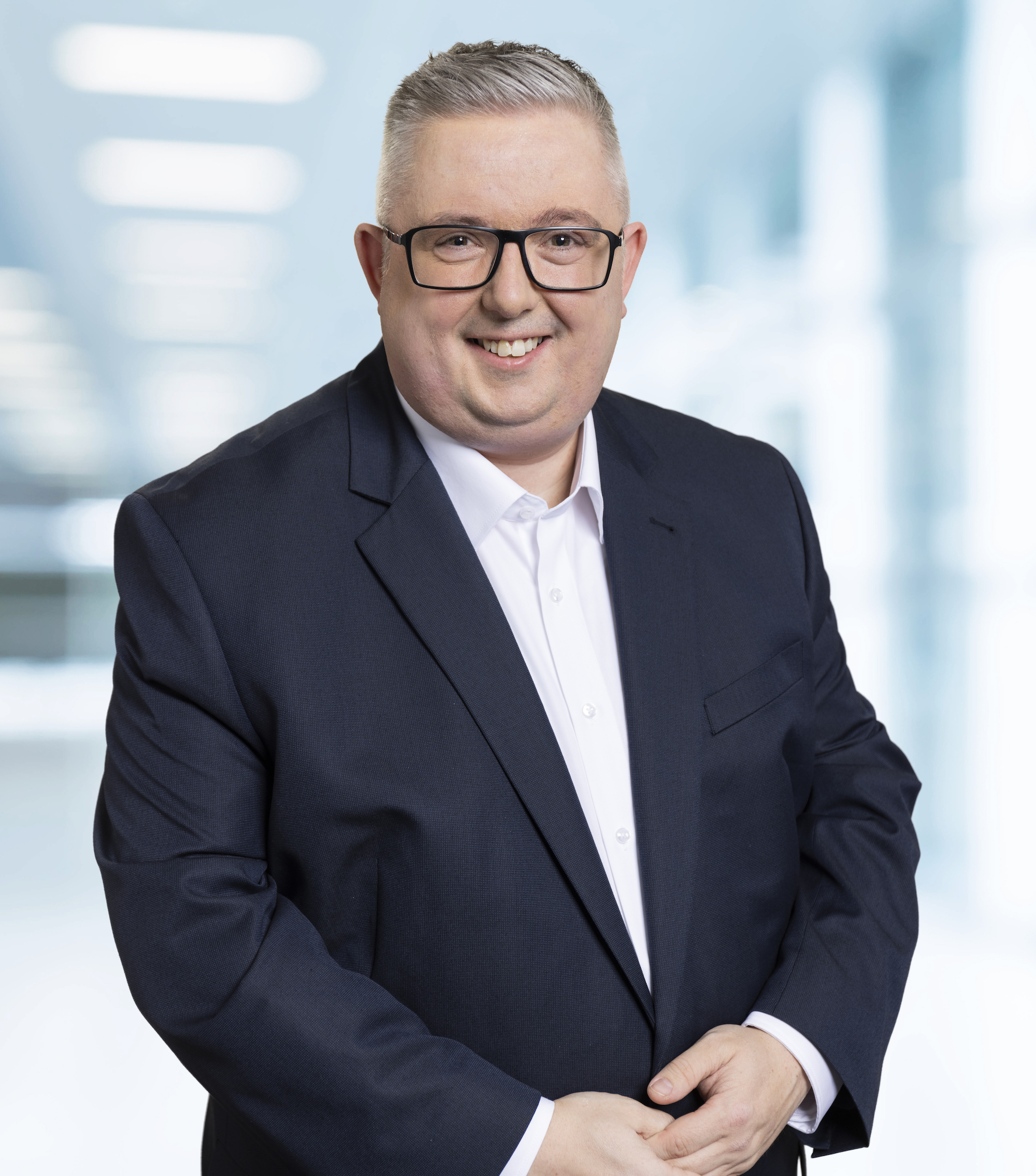
- Lienesch in 2022

Member of the Landtag of North Rhine-Westphalia
- Incumbent
- Assumed office 1 June 2022
- Preceded by: Constituency established
- Constituency: Rhein-Sieg-Kreis V

Personal details
- Born: 7 October 1978 (age 47)
- Party: Christian Democratic Union (since 1998)

Sascha Lienesch (born 7 October 1978) is a German politician serving as a member of the Landtag of North Rhine-Westphalia since 2022. He has been a city councillor of Sankt Augustin since 2004, and has served as group leader of the Christian Democratic Union in the city council since 2020.
