= Paul Pierce =

American basketball player (born 1977)

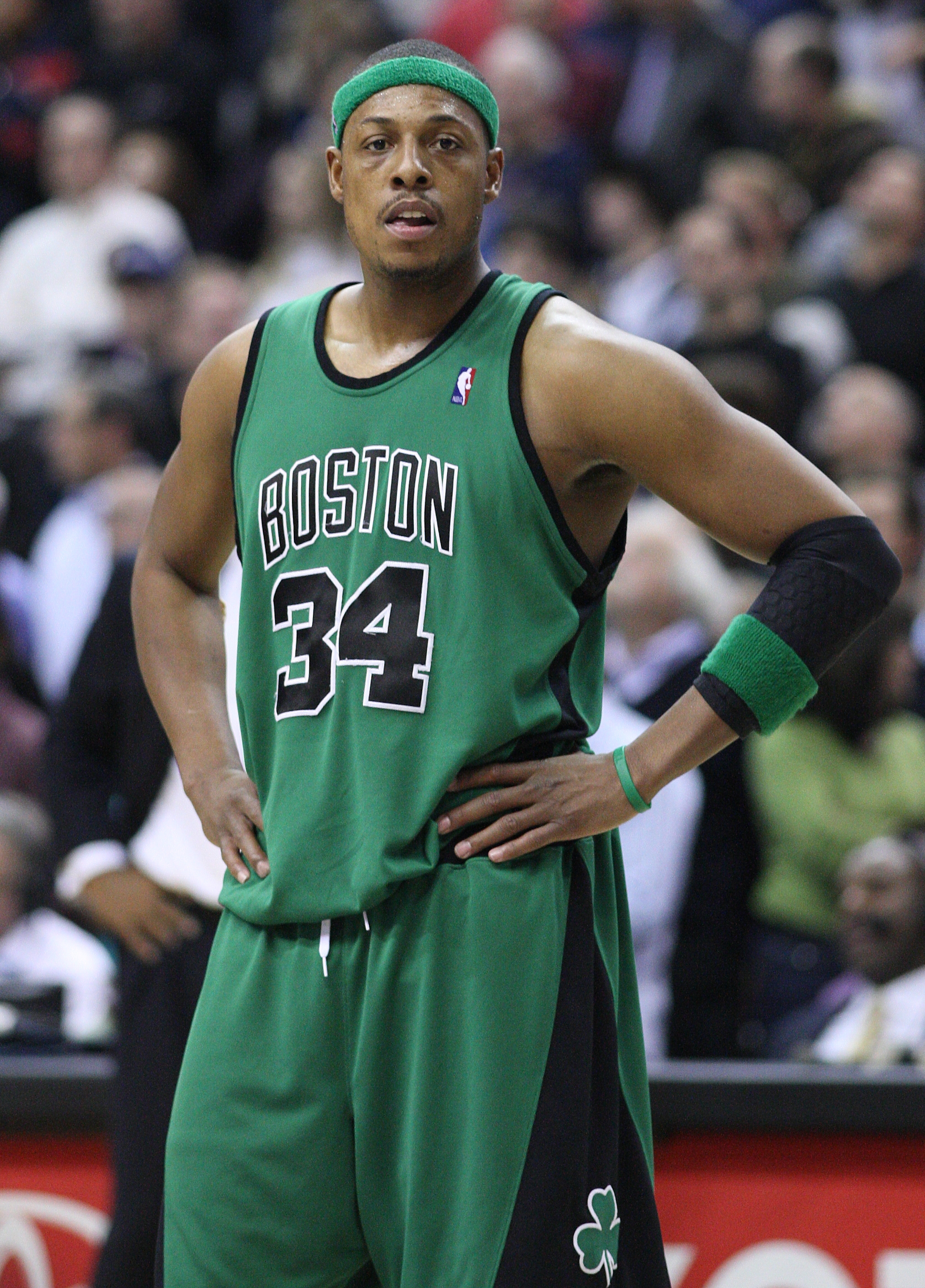
- Pierce with the Boston Celtics in 2008

Personal information
- Born: October 13, 1977 (age 49) Oakland, California, U.S.
- Listed height: 6 ft 7 in (2.01 m)
- Listed weight: 235 lb (107 kg)

Career information
- High school: Inglewood (Inglewood, California)
- College: Kansas (1995–1998)
- NBA draft: 1998: 1st round, 10th overall pick
- Drafted by: Boston Celtics
- Playing career: 1998–2017
- Position: Small forward / shooting guard
- Number: 34

Career history
- 1998–2013: Boston Celtics
- 2013–2014: Brooklyn Nets
- 2014–2015: Washington Wizards
- 2015–2017: Los Angeles Clippers

Career highlights
- NBA champion (2008); NBA Finals MVP (2008); 10× NBA All-Star (2002–2006, 2008–2012); All-NBA Second Team (2009); 3× All-NBA Third Team (2002, 2003, 2008); NBA All-Rookie First Team (1999); NBA Three-Point Contest champion (2010); NBA 75th Anniversary Team; No. 34 retired by Boston Celtics; Consensus first-team All-American (1998); First-team All-Big 12 (1998); Third-team All-Big 12 (1997); 2× Big 12 tournament MVP (1997, 1998); No. 34 jersey retired by Kansas Jayhawks; McDonald's All-American (1995); Second-team Parade All-American (1995); California Mr. Basketball (1995)

Career NBA statistics
- Points: 26,397 (19.7 ppg)
- Rebounds: 7,527 (5.6 rpg)
- Assists: 4,708 (3.5 apg)
- Stats at NBA.com
- Stats at Basketball Reference
- Basketball Hall of Fame
- Collegiate Basketball Hall of Fame

Paul Anthony Pierce (born October 13, 1977) is an American former professional basketball player who played 19 seasons in the National Basketball Association (NBA). Nicknamed "the Truth", he spent his first 15 seasons with the Boston Celtics, who drafted him 10th overall in the 1998 NBA draft, and was named NBA Finals MVP following Boston's victory in the 2008 NBA Finals.

Pierce was a high school McDonald's All-American before earning consensus first-team All-America honors as a junior playing college basketball for the Kansas Jayhawks. After being chosen by the Boston Celtics with the 10th overall pick in the 1998 NBA draft, Pierce spent the first 15 years of his career with Boston. Pierce's nickname, "the Truth," was given to him by Shaquille O'Neal in 2001. He earned 10 All-Star selections and became a four-time All-NBA team member during his career. Pierce combined with Kevin Garnett and Ray Allen in 2007 to form a "Big Three" that led Boston to two NBA Finals and an NBA championship in 2008. Pierce was named NBA Finals Most Valuable Player in 2008. In 2021, Pierce was honored by being named to the NBA 75th Anniversary Team and was inducted into the Naismith Memorial Basketball Hall of Fame.

In 2013, Pierce was traded to the Brooklyn Nets along with teammates Kevin Garnett and Jason Terry. He signed with the Washington Wizards as a free agent in 2014. After one season with the Wizards, Pierce signed with the Los Angeles Clippers. He spent two seasons with the Clippers before retiring in 2017. On July 17, 2017, the Celtics signed Pierce to a contract, enabling him to retire as a member of the organization.

== Early life ==
Pierce was born in Oakland, California. His family later moved to Inglewood, California, where he attended Inglewood High School. He was cut from Inglewood's varsity basketball team during his freshman and sophomore years and considered transferring schools. Pierce struggled after rejoining the varsity team in his sophomore year, but after helping lead Inglewood to a win during a tournament in Chino, California, his performance on the court improved. In his senior year, he averaged 27 points, 11 rebounds, and 4 assists per game. Pierce went on to participate in the 1995 McDonald's All-American Game alongside future NBA stars Kevin Garnett, Vince Carter, Stephon Marbury, and Antawn Jamison, and was a contestant in the game's Slam Dunk Contest, which was won by Carter. He grew up a Los Angeles Lakers fan and dreamed of playing for the team.

In 2012, Pierce was honored as one of the 35 Greatest McDonald's All-Americans.

== College career ==
Pierce spent three years at the University of Kansas between 1995 and 1998. He earned honorable mention All-Big Eight honors and was selected second-team Freshman All-American by Basketball Weekly. He was also honored as the Big Eight Co-Freshman of the Year with Colorado's Chauncey Billups. During the summer of 1996, Pierce earned a spot on the roster of the USA's Under 22 team and helped the United States go undefeated in the World Championship-qualifying tournament in Puerto Rico. As a sophomore with the Jayhawks, Pierce captured the first of two Big 12 Conference tournament Most Valuable Player awards after averaging 21.7 points and guiding Kansas to the inaugural tournament championship.

As a junior in 1997–98, Pierce won Most Valuable Player honors in both the Preseason NIT and the Big 12 Conference tournament. He was selected First Team All-Big 12 Conference by both the AP and Coaches, and was named Associated Press First Team All-American and a finalist for the 1998 John Wooden and Naismith awards. He scored 777 points as a junior—the fifth-most single-season point total in Jayhawks history. He ranks as the fifth-leading scorer in Kansas history (1,786 points) and 11th on the all-time rebounds list (676).

Pierce left the University of Kansas following his junior season and entered the 1998 NBA draft.

== Professional career ==
=== Boston Celtics (1998–2013) ===
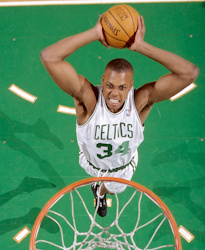
Pierce attempting a dunk in January 2000.

==== Early years and breakthrough (1998–2001) ====
Pierce was selected with the 10th overall pick in the 1998 NBA draft by the Boston Celtics, a team he "despised" growing up. He scored 19 or more points in 10 of his first 11 contests. For that year, he averaged 16.5 points and finished third in the voting for Rookie of the Year honors. In his second season, he raised his scoring average to 19.5 points per game. In the 2000–01 season, Pierce appeared in 82 games (all starts), averaging 25.3 points, 6.4 rebounds, 3.1 assists and 1.68 steals in 38.0 minutes. He led the Celtics and finished eighth in the league in points per game and fourth in total points (2,071). He was named NBA Player of the Month for March 2001 after averaging 30.3 points, 7.2 rebounds, 3.4 assists, and 1.60 steals for the month.

==== First All-Star and playoff appearances (2001–2007) ====
In the 2001–02 season, Pierce was named Eastern Conference Co-Player of the Month twice, for December and April. That season, Pierce led the Celtics to the playoffs for the first time in seven years and on to the Eastern Conference Finals. In Game 3 of the conference finals, the Celtics pulled off the largest fourth-quarter comeback in NBA playoff history, with Pierce scoring 19 of his 28 points in the final 12 minutes as Boston overcame a 21-point deficit to beat the New Jersey Nets 94–90. The win gave the Celtics a 2–1 advantage in the series; however, the Nets went on to win the series in six games.

From 2002 to 2006, Pierce made the All-Star team every season. He led the league in total points (2,144) in 2002 and was an All-NBA Third Team selection in 2002 and 2003. In the 2007 offseason, Pierce requested a trade to the Dallas Mavericks, and stated that he would publicly demand a trade unless the Celtics acquired a co-star for him. A three-team trade between the Celtics, Mavericks, and the Atlanta Hawks was nearly completed, but Atlanta canceled the trade upon learning that Boston would receive a first-round pick. Instead, the Celtics decided to fulfill Pierce's request for a co-star.

==== NBA champion and Finals MVP (2007–2008) ====
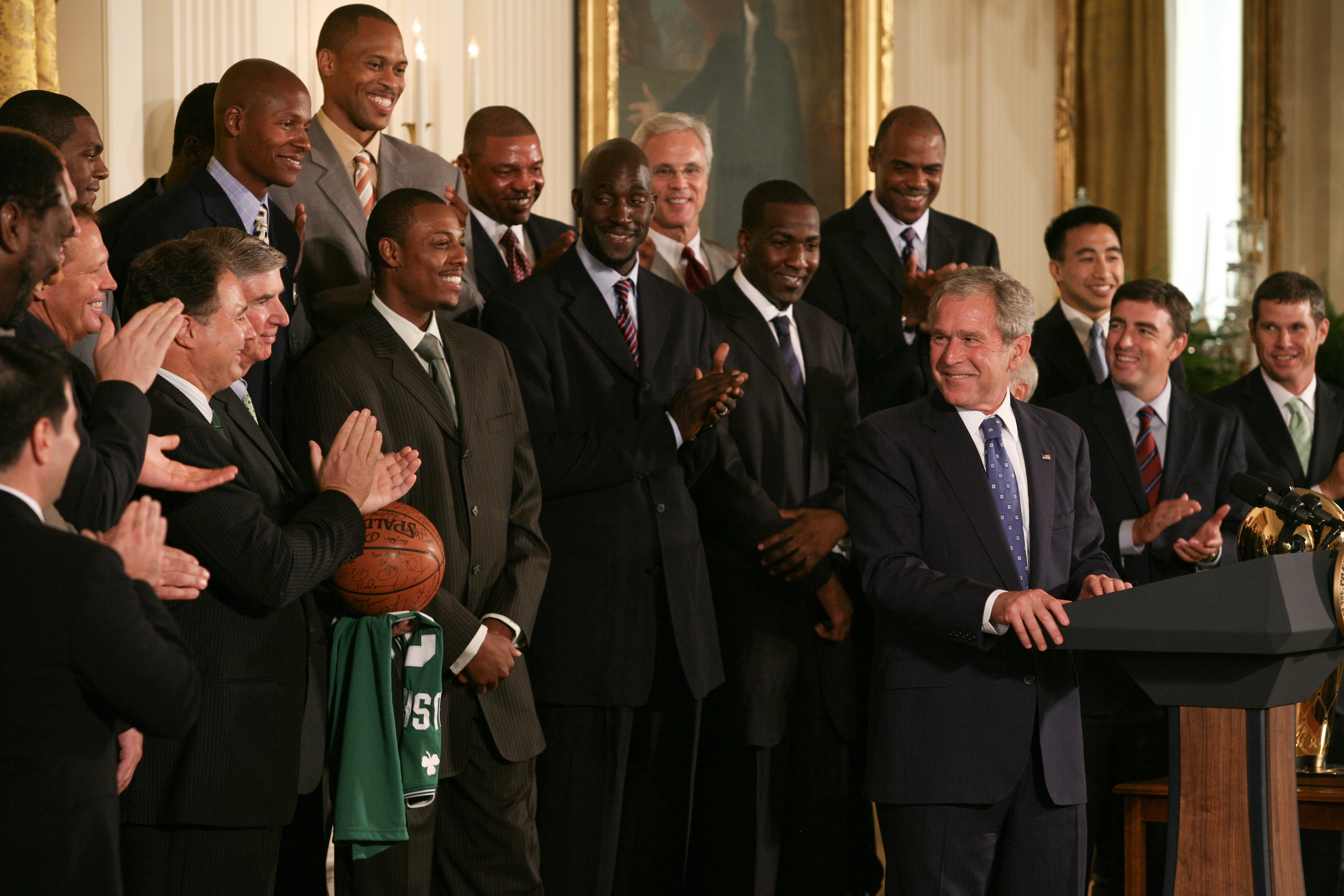
Pierce and the 2008 NBA champion Boston Celtics with President George W. Bush at the White House

Prior to the 2007–08 season, the Celtics acquired the services of fellow NBA All-Stars Ray Allen and Kevin Garnett. The pair combined with Pierce to form a "Big Three". The Celtics completed the largest single-season turnaround in NBA history, with the "Big Three" leading Boston to 66 wins in the regular season, a 42-game improvement. However, the team struggled initially in the playoffs. The Atlanta Hawks took them to seven games in the first round, as did the Cleveland Cavaliers in the conference semifinals. In Game 7 of their series against the Cavaliers, Pierce racked up the second most Game 7 points in franchise history with 41 as the Celtics edged the Cavaliers to advance to the Eastern Conference Finals. The Celtics went on to defeat the Detroit Pistons in six games in the Eastern Conference Finals, winning two road games.

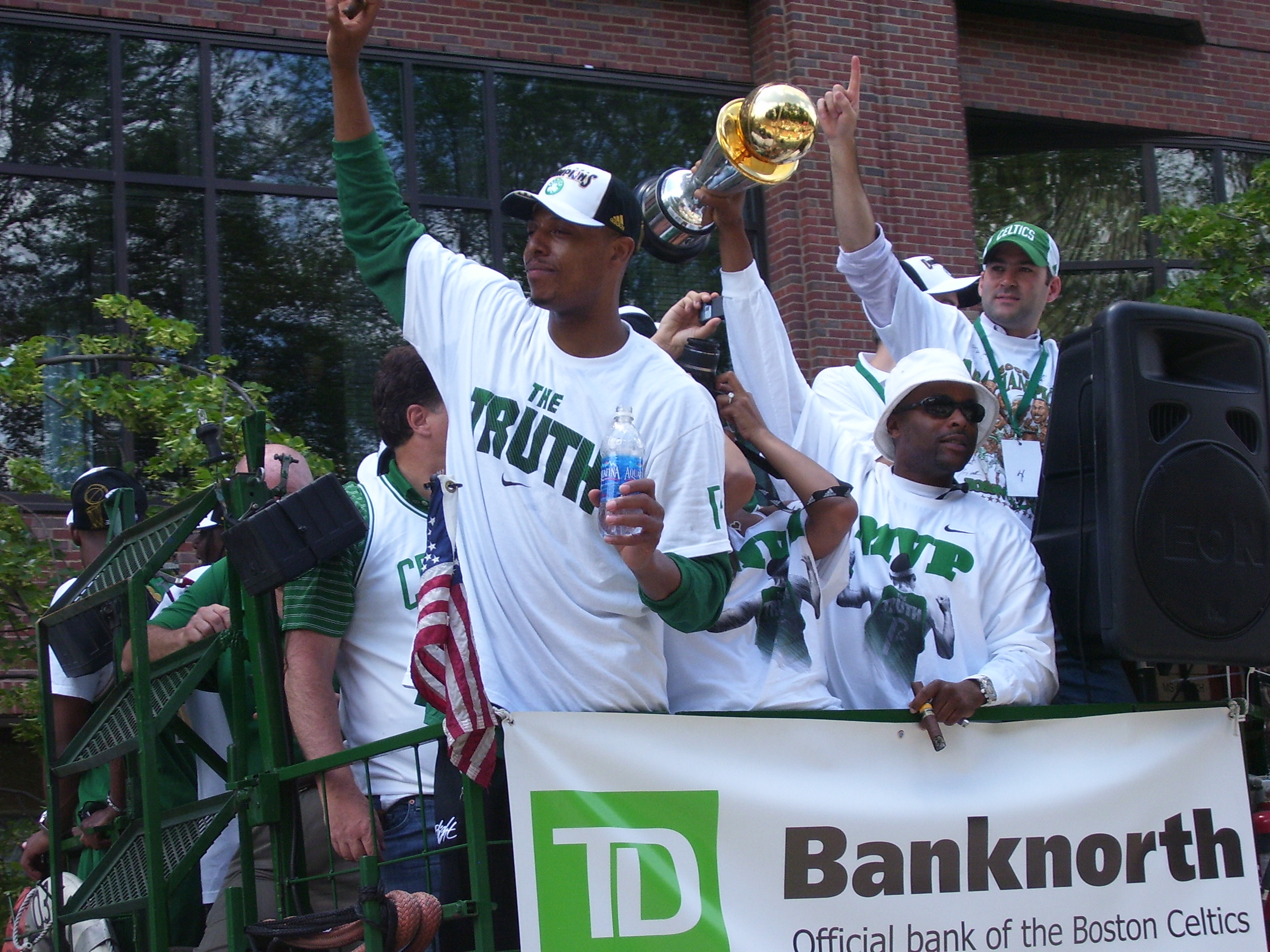
Pierce at the Celtics' 2008 championship parade.

On June 5, 2008, in Game 1 of the 2008 NBA Finals against the Los Angeles Lakers, Pierce was injured in the third quarter and was carried off the court appearing to be in serious pain. However, he came back to the court only a few minutes later to spark the Celtics with 15 points in the third quarter en route to a 98–88 victory. He went on to lead the Celtics to their 17th championship with a 4–2 series victory over the Lakers. Pierce was named the NBA Finals Most Valuable Player after averaging 22 points per game over the six-game series.

==== Coming up short (2008–2012) ====
Pierce and the Celtics looked to repeat as world champions during the 2008–09 NBA season. Pierce missed only one game the entire season and led the team in scoring. He was named to the 2009 NBA All-Star Game and for the first time to the All-NBA Second Team. Despite Pierce's success, with Kevin Garnett injured, the Celtics lost in the second round of the 2009 NBA Playoffs.

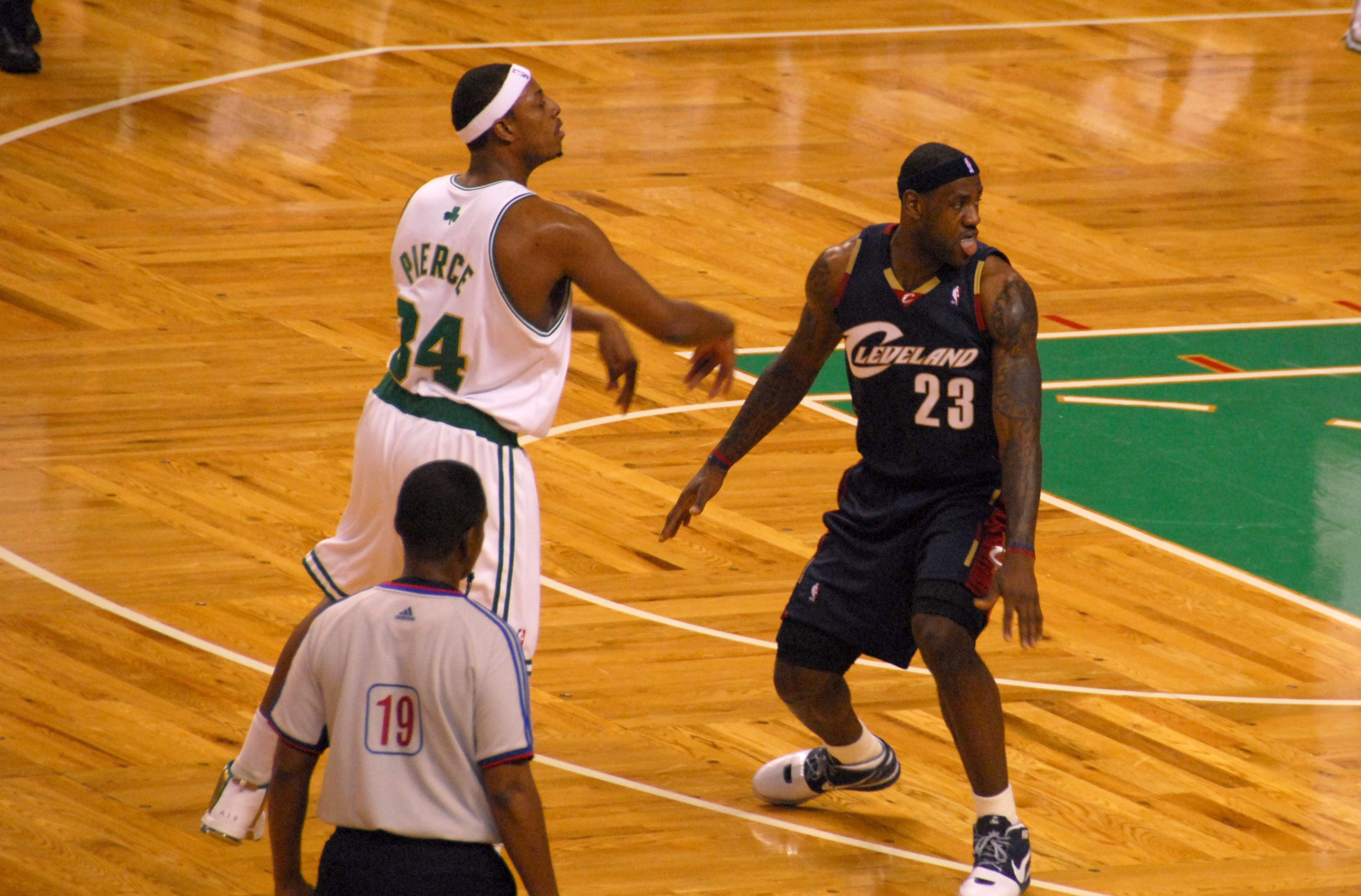
Pierce being defended by LeBron James in October 2008.

At the 2010 NBA All-Star Game at Cowboys Stadium in Arlington, Texas, Pierce became the first Celtic since Larry Bird to win the Three-Point Contest.

In Game 3 of the first round between the Celtics and Miami Heat in the 2010 NBA Playoffs, Pierce hit a 21-foot jumper at the buzzer to beat Miami 100–98 and give the Celtics a 3–0 series lead. The Celtics went on to win that series, and also defeated the heavily favored Cavaliers in the second round. They faced the Orlando Magic in the Eastern Conference Finals and beat them in 6 games to advance to their second Finals appearance in the Big 3 era. They faced off against the Lakers in a rematch of the 2008 NBA Finals and took a 3–2 lead heading back to Los Angeles. However, in spite of Rasheed Wallace more than making up for the loss of injured center Kendrick Perkins, the Celtics were blown out in Game 6 and lost a 13-point second-half lead in Game 7, losing the deciding game 83–79.

On June 29, 2010, Pierce opted out of his contract and invoked his early termination clause to become an unrestricted free agent on July 1, 2010. However, on July 2, Pierce and the Celtics verbally agreed to a four-year extension keeping him in Boston through the 2013–14 season.

On November 3, 2010, during a game against the Milwaukee Bucks, Pierce scored his 20,000th career point on a free throw, becoming the third player in Celtics history to reach that milestone solely in a Celtics uniform. The Celtics finished the season with the number 3 seed in the Eastern Conference and swept the New York Knicks in the first round of the playoffs. In the second round, the Celtics took on the Miami Heat and their big three of LeBron James, Dwyane Wade, and Chris Bosh. The Celtics lost to Miami, who eventually moved on to the NBA Finals, in five games.

On February 7, 2012, during a game against the Charlotte Bobcats, Pierce scored 15 points to pass Larry Bird for second place on the Boston Celtics' all-time scoring list. He was named to his tenth NBA All-Star appearance on February 9, 2012. He then played his 1,000th career game with the Celtics on March 9, 2012, against the Portland Trail Blazers; only Pierce, John Havlicek, and Robert Parish have played in over 1,000 career games for the Celtics. For the 2011–12 season, Pierce averaged 19.4 points, 4.5 assists, and 5.2 rebounds per game as the Celtics finished the season 39–27 during the shortened lockout season.

In the playoffs, the Celtics beat the Hawks in six games in the first round, as Pierce averaged 21.2 points per game during the series. In the conference semifinals, the Celtics faced the Philadelphia 76ers led by Doug Collins. They pushed the Celtics into a full seven-game series, but the Celtics won the final game 85–75. The Celtics then played the Miami Heat in the conference finals. Pierce hit a crucial 3-pointer over LeBron James in game 5 to take a series lead of 3–2, but the Celtics lost the last two games, and the Heat advanced to the NBA Finals. Pierce finished the playoffs averaging 18.9 points per game while shooting only 38.6 percent from the field and 31 percent from three.

==== Final season in Boston (2012–2013) ====
The 2012–13 season did not go as planned for the Celtics, with All-Star point guard Rajon Rondo out with a torn ACL injury. On January 27, 2013, against the Miami Heat, Pierce recorded his first triple-double of the season with 17 points, 13 rebounds, and 10 assists. On February 10, 2013, against the Denver Nuggets, Pierce recorded his second triple-double of the season with 27 points, 14 rebounds, and 14 assists becoming the oldest player, in a game of any length, to record at least 20 points, 12 rebounds, and 12 assists (previously held by Larry Bird). On March 29, 2013, against the Atlanta Hawks, Pierce recorded his third triple-double of the season with 20 points, 10 rebounds, and 10 assists. Pierce finished the 2012–13 season with season averages of 18.6 points, 6.3 rebounds, and 4.8 assists per game while the Celtics managed to clinch the 7th seed in the playoffs with a 41–40 season record (with one game not played because of the Boston Marathon bombing). The Celtics lost to the New York Knicks in the 1st round in six games. Pierce averaged 19.2 points per game while shooting a poor 36.8 percent from the field and 26.8 percent from three-point range along with 5.7 rebounds and 5.3 assists in the playoff series loss.

=== Brooklyn Nets (2013–2014) ===
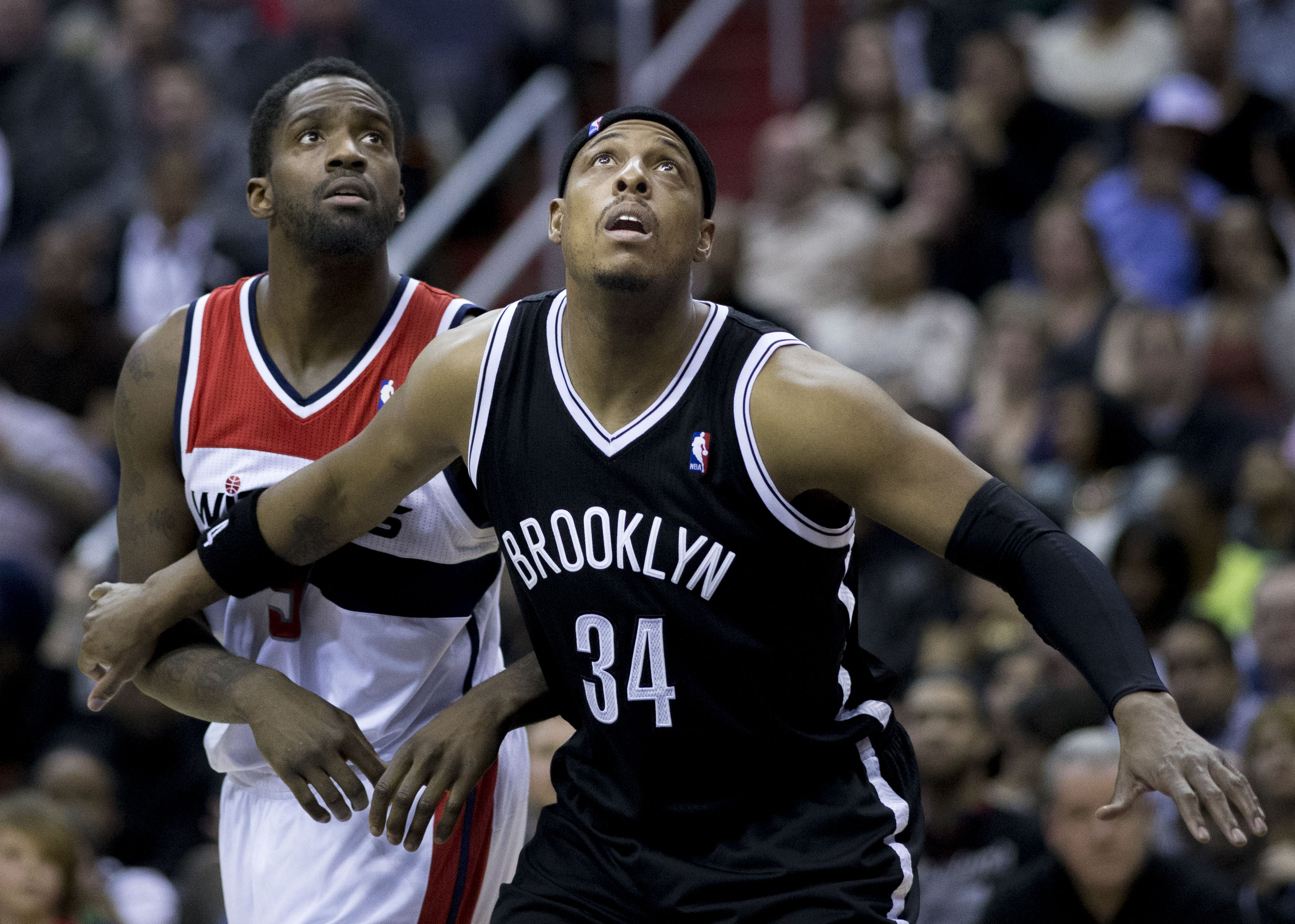
Pierce in his lone season with the Brooklyn Nets

On June 28, 2013, the day of the NBA draft, the Boston Celtics and Brooklyn Nets reached a deal to trade Pierce, Kevin Garnett, and Jason Terry for future first-round picks in the 2014, 2016, and 2018 drafts and Kris Humphries, Gerald Wallace, Kris Joseph, MarShon Brooks, and Keith Bogans. The deal was completed on July 12, 2013. Brooklyn also received D. J. White and the Celtics also received the right to swap first-round picks in the 2017 draft. Pierce convinced Garnett to waive his no-trade clause so that the deal could come to fruition. At an introductory press conference with Garnett and Terry following the trade, Pierce stated, "We are championship driven... We made a lot of money in our careers. We have won a number of awards. At this point right now, we are about winning a championship. Brooklyn gives us the best opportunity."

In 2013–14, Pierce appeared in 75 games (including 68 starts), averaging 13.5 points, 4.6 rebounds and 2.4 assists in 28.0 minutes. He scored 1,000 points for the 15th straight season, becoming the only active NBA player and the sixth player in NBA history (along with Kareem Abdul-Jabbar, Karl Malone, John Havlicek, Elvin Hayes, Robert Parish) to score 1,000 points in 15 straight seasons. He passed Allen Iverson and Patrick Ewing on the NBA's all-time scoring list (moving up to 18th in NBA history), moved into fifth place in all-time NBA history with 1,935 career three-pointers made, and had his most steals (86) in a season since 2007–08. On April 11, 2014, against Atlanta, Pierce became the fourth active player (along with Kobe Bryant, Dirk Nowitzki and Garnett) and the 18th player in NBA history to score 25,000 career points.

Prior to the season, the Nets were thought to be contenders to win the Eastern Conference. Pierce and Garnett were set to be the supporting cast to Deron Williams, Joe Johnson, and Brook Lopez. After scraping past the Toronto Raptors in the first round of the playoffs thanks to a last-second block from Pierce in Game 7, their attempt to get past the Heat and win a championship fell short. They lost to Miami in five games in the second round.

=== Washington Wizards (2014–2015) ===
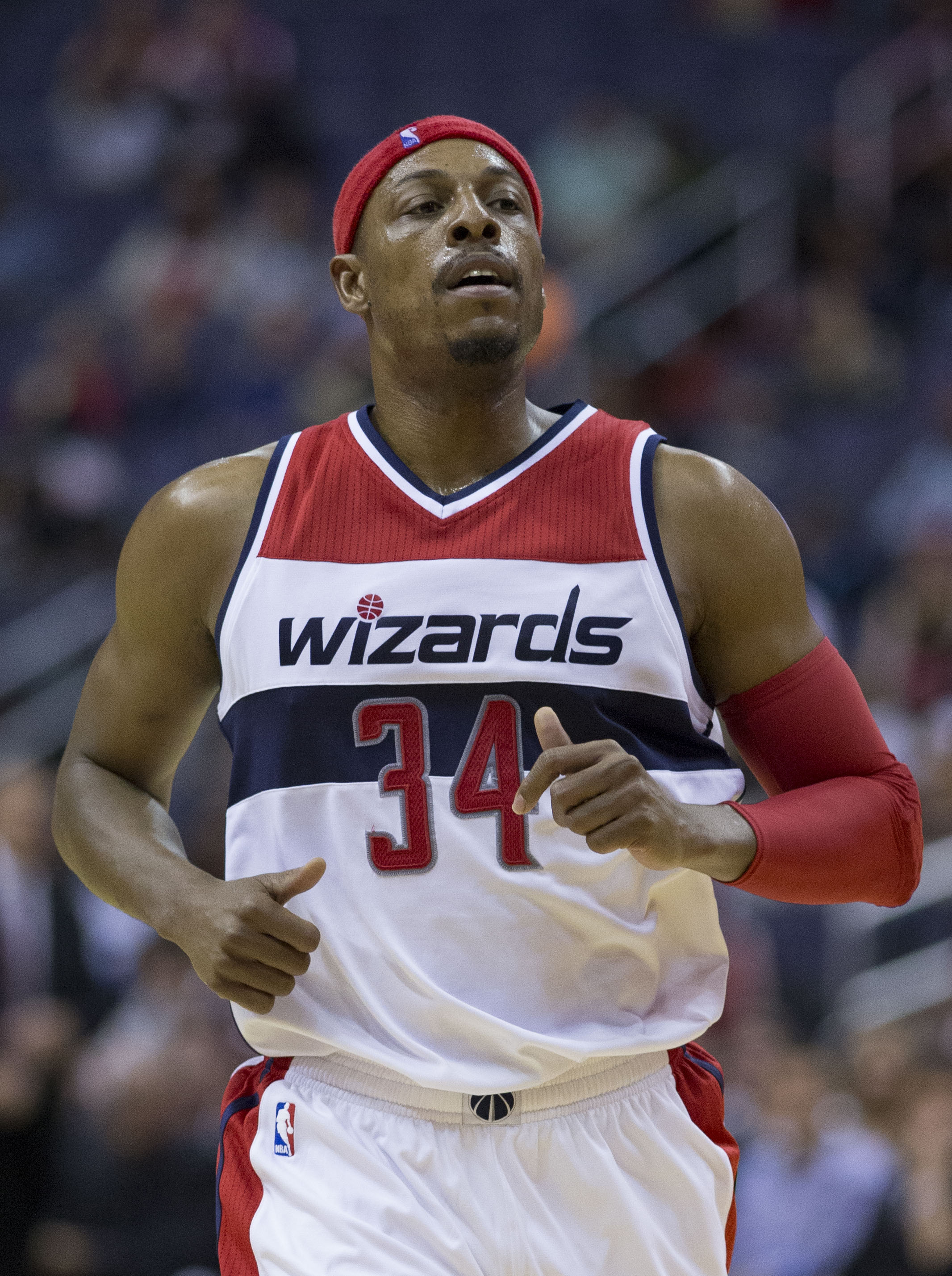
Pierce with the Wizards in October 2014

On July 17, 2014, Pierce signed a two-year, $11 million contract with the Washington Wizards. With 14 points against the Atlanta Hawks on November 25, 2014, Pierce passed Jerry West for 17th place on the NBA's career scoring list. Two weeks later, Pierce passed Reggie Miller for 16th place on the NBA's career scoring list with a season-high 28 points against the Boston Celtics. On January 14, 2015, Pierce passed Jason Kidd for fourth all-time in three-pointers made in a 105–99 win over the Chicago Bulls. Eleven days later, he recorded his 2,000th career three-pointer in a 117–115 overtime win over the Denver Nuggets. On February 2, 2015, he passed Alex English for 15th place on the NBA's career scoring list with 11 points against the Charlotte Hornets. Pierce finished the regular season averaging 11.9 points per game, a career low.

On May 9, 2015, Pierce made a two-point shot with three defenders on him at the buzzer to defeat the Atlanta Hawks 103–101 and take a 2–1 series lead in the Eastern Conference semi-finals. He finished the game with 13 points and 7 rebounds. In Game 6 of the series on May 15, the Wizards were down 94–91 with seconds remaining when Pierce launched a three-pointer, hoping to extend the Wizards' season by forcing overtime. The shot swished, apparently tying the score at the buzzer, but the play was reviewed, showing the clock expired before Pierce released the basketball.

Pierce defending Kobe Bryant in December 2014

On June 27, 2015, Pierce opted out of the second year of his contract with the Wizards to become a free agent.

=== Los Angeles Clippers (2015–2017) ===
On July 10, 2015, Pierce signed a three-year, $10 million contract with the Los Angeles Clippers, reuniting him with his former Boston Celtics coach Doc Rivers in his hometown of Los Angeles. He made his debut for the Clippers in the team's season opener against the Sacramento Kings on October 28, recording 12 points and 7 rebounds off the bench in a 111–104 win. With Lance Stephenson starting at small forward, Pierce began the season as a role player off the bench for the first time in his career. On December 16, Pierce scored six points against the Milwaukee Bucks. In the game, he hit a buzzer-beater to end the first quarter and became the fifth active player and 16th in NBA history to reach 26,000 points.

On September 26, 2016, Pierce announced that the 2016–17 season would be his last in the NBA. In what would be his last game in Boston, on February 5, 2017, Pierce started and played the first five minutes before heading to the bench—it was his first appearance for the Clippers since New Year's Eve. Although the crowd chanted his name in the final minutes, Pierce did not re-enter the game until there was 19 seconds left; he hit a three-pointer to finish the game for his only points of the contest. On April 10, 2017, he scored all of his 10 points in the final five minutes of the Clippers' 125–96 win over the Houston Rockets. He subsequently moved into 15th on the NBA career scoring list with 26,397 points. The Clippers finished the regular season with a 51–31 record and entered the playoffs as the No. 4 seed. They went on to lose their first-round playoff series to the Utah Jazz in seven games, as Pierce's 19-year NBA career came to an end at the final buzzer of Game 7 on April 30, 2017. In his final game, he had six points and three rebounds in 21 minutes and averaged 11.1 minutes in the series. On June 28, 2017, he was waived by the Clippers.

=== Retirement ===
On July 17, 2017, Pierce signed a ceremonial contract with the Boston Celtics in order to retire with the team. On August 18, 2017, the Celtics announced Pierce's jersey would be retired on February 11, 2018. His jersey was raised to the rafters of TD Garden in a postgame ceremony following the Celtics-Cavaliers game, becoming the 23rd person in Celtics history to be honored.

In 2021, Pierce was inducted into the Naismith Memorial Basketball Hall of Fame.

== International career ==
Pierce was a member of the United States national team for the 2002 FIBA World Championship, starting all nine games and averaging 19.8 points per game. Pierce was also selected for the United States national team for the 2006 FIBA World Championship, but did not compete because of minor off-season surgery.

== Broadcasting career ==
=== ESPN ===
In August 2017, Pierce joined ESPN as a studio analyst for The Jump and NBA Countdown, after appearing as a guest analyst during the 2016 and 2017 NBA Finals for NBA Countdown. His role at the network was reduced in 2019 due to questions about his preparation for NBA segments and game predictions.

Pierce was fired by ESPN after streaming from his Instagram Live on April 2, 2021. During the livestream at a poker game, he featured several women wearing bikinis who were massaging his shoulders or twerking. Pierce also showcased himself drinking alcohol from a small cup and smoking a blunt while responding to fan messages. ESPN ended its relationship with Pierce on April 5, 2021, and had no further comment on the firing. Pierce later responded to news of his firing with a Twitter video of him laughing while also tweeting that "Big things are coming soon" and "I can't lose even when I lose, I'm winning."

=== Fox Sports 1 ===
In March 2024, Pierce joined Fox Sports 1 as a basketball analyst in a contributor role for the sports talk show Undisputed, hosted by commentator Skip Bayless.

Following the departure of Skip Bayless and the discontinuation of Undisputed in August 2024, Pierce moved to the sports talk show Speak.

In May 2025, Pierce walked 20 miles in a bathrobe to the Fox Sports 1 studio lot after failing on his promise of a Celtics victory against the Knicks in game 2 of the Eastern Conference semifinals. The Celtics lost, 91–90.

== Personal life ==
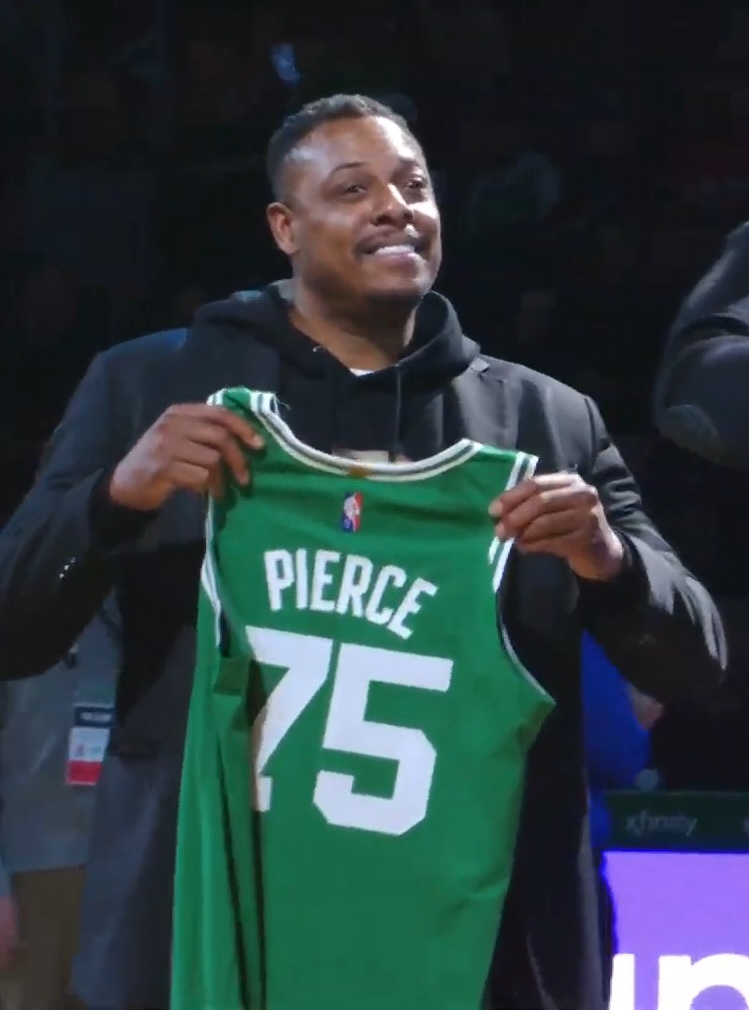
Pierce in 2022

Pierce and his ex-wife Julie (née Landrum) have two daughters and one son.

Paul has two half brothers, Jamal and Steve Hosey. Steve was a first round draft selection and reached the MLB ranks with the San Francisco Giants. Jamal played college basketball for Wyoming.

In October 2025, Pierce was arrested in California on suspicion of driving under the influence.

=== Stabbing incident ===
On September 25, 2000, Pierce was stabbed 11 times in the face, neck, and back and had a bottle smashed over his head while at the Buzz Club, a late-night dance club in the Boston Theater District. He had to undergo lung surgery to repair the damage; nevertheless, Pierce was the only Celtics player to start all 82 games in the 2000–01 season. Tony Battie, Pierce's teammate at the time, along with Battie's brother, saved him by rushing him to a nearby hospital. In 2003, two and a half years after the attack, Pierce pledged $2.5 million to help expand the high-tech surgical center at Tufts-New England Medical Center that helped make his recovery possible. Pierce stated, "This is an opportunity for me to give back to the hospital that was there for me when I needed it."

In August 2018, Pierce discussed battling depression for a year after his stabbing, revealing that he dealt with paranoia over crowds and post-traumatic stress stemming from the incident. He divulged this information as part of the NBA's initiative to focus on the mental health of its players.

=== Nickname ===
Pierce's nickname, "the Truth", was bestowed on him by Shaquille O'Neal after a 112–107 Los Angeles Lakers victory over the Celtics on March 13, 2001, in which Pierce scored 42 points on 13-of-19 shooting. O'Neal pulled Boston Herald reporter Steve Bulpett over and gestured toward his notepad. "Take this down," said O'Neal. "My name is Shaquille O'Neal and Paul Pierce is the motherfucking truth. Quote me on that and don't take nothing out. I knew he could play, but I didn't know he could play like this. Paul Pierce is The Truth."

=== 2022 EthereumMax lawsuit ===
In January 2022, in a class-action lawsuit filed against the cryptocurrency company EthereumMax that alleged the company is a pump and dump scheme, Pierce was named as a defendant along with media personality Kim Kardashian, former professional boxer Floyd Mayweather Jr., and other celebrities for promoting the EthereumMax token on their social media accounts. In February 2022, the U.S. 11th Circuit Court of Appeals ruled in a lawsuit against Bitconnect that the Securities Act of 1933 extends to targeted solicitation using social media. In December 2022, Central California U.S. District Court Judge Michael W. Fitzgerald dismissed the lawsuit on the basis that the claims were insufficiently supported given heightened pleading standards for fraud.

=== Television ===
On the March 19, 2024, episode of Extended Family, entitled "The Consequences of Being Irish," Pierce played himself at a fictional Boston Celtics fundraising event.

== NBA career statistics ==
Legend
GP	Games played	GS	Games started	MPG	Minutes per game
FG%	Field goal percentage	3P%	3-point field goal percentage	FT%	Free throw percentage
RPG	Rebounds per game	APG	Assists per game	SPG	Steals per game
BPG	Blocks per game	PPG	Points per game	**Bold**	Career high
†	Won an NBA championship	*	Led the league	‡	NBA record

=== Regular season ===
Year	Team	GP	GS	MPG	FG%	3P%	FT%	RPG	APG	SPG	BPG	PPG
1998–99	Boston	48	47	34.0	.439	.412	.713	6.4	2.4	1.7	**1.0**	16.5
1999–00	Boston	73	72	35.4	.442	.343	.798	5.4	3.0	**2.1**	.8	19.5
2000–01	Boston	**82**	**82***	38.0	.454	.383	.745	6.4	3.1	1.7	.8	25.3
2001–02	Boston	**82**	**82**	**40.3**	.442	.404	.809	6.9	3.2	1.9	**1.0**	26.1
2002–03	Boston	79	79	39.2	.416	.302	.802	**7.3**	4.4	1.8	.8	25.9
2003–04	Boston	80	80	38.7	.402	.299	.819	6.5	**5.1**	1.6	.7	23.0
2004–05	Boston	**82**	**82***	36.1	.455	.370	.822	6.6	4.2	1.6	.5	21.6
2005–06	Boston	79	79	39.0	.471	.354	.772	6.7	4.7	1.4	.4	**26.8**
2006–07	Boston	47	46	37.0	.439	.389	.796	5.9	4.1	1.0	.3	25.0
2007–08†	Boston	80	80	35.9	.464	.392	.843	5.1	4.5	1.3	.5	19.6
2008–09	Boston	81	81	37.5	.457	.391	.830	5.6	3.6	1.0	.3	20.5
2009–10	Boston	71	71	34.0	.472	**.414**	.852	4.4	3.1	1.2	.4	18.3
2010–11	Boston	80	80	34.7	**.497**	.374	**.860**	5.4	3.3	1.0	.6	18.9
2011–12	Boston	61	61	34.0	.443	.366	.852	5.2	4.5	1.1	.4	19.4
2012–13	Boston	77	77	33.4	.436	.380	.787	6.3	4.8	1.1	.4	18.6
2013–14	Brooklyn	75	68	28.0	.451	.373	.826	4.6	2.4	1.1	.4	13.5
2014–15	Washington	73	73	26.2	.447	.389	.781	4.0	2.0	.6	.3	11.9
2015–16	L.A. Clippers	68	38	18.1	.363	.310	.818	2.7	1.0	.5	.3	6.1
2016–17	L.A. Clippers	25	7	11.1	.400	.349	.769	1.9	.4	.2	.2	3.2
Career		1,343	1,285	34.2	.445	.368	.806	5.6	3.5	1.3	.6	19.7
All-Star		10	0	13.6	.456	.188	.727	2.6	1.8	1.2	.1	9.6

=== Playoffs ===
Year	Team	GP	GS	MPG	FG%	3P%	FT%	RPG	APG	SPG	BPG	PPG
2002	Boston	16	16	42.0	.403	.288	.764	8.6	4.1	1.7	1.3	24.6
2003	Boston	10	10	**44.5**	.399	.356	.863	**9.0**	**6.7**	**2.1**	.8	**27.1**
2004	Boston	4	4	40.5	.342	.294	.839	8.8	2.5	1.3	1.0	20.8
2005	Boston	7	7	39.6	**.505**	.259	.868	7.7	4.6	1.9	**1.4**	22.9
2008†	Boston	**26**‡	**26**‡	38.1	.441	.361	.802	5.0	4.6	1.1	.3	19.7
2009	Boston	14	14	39.7	.430	.333	.842	5.8	3.1	1.1	.4	21.0
2010	Boston	24*	24*	38.8	.438	.392	.824	6.0	3.4	1.0	.6	18.8
2011	Boston	9	9	38.1	.459	.447	.882	5.0	2.8	1.3	.4	20.8
2012	Boston	20	20	38.9	.386	.310	.894	6.1	3.1	1.5	.9	18.9
2013	Boston	6	6	42.5	.368	.268	.897	5.7	5.3	.8	.5	19.2
2014	Brooklyn	12	12	30.7	.465	.358	.781	4.5	2.0	1.2	.3	13.7
2015	Washington	10	10	29.8	.485	**.524**	.850	4.2	.9	.6	.7	14.6
2016	L.A. Clippers	5	1	10.8	.167	.200	.850	1.2	.2	.4	.0	1.2
2017	L.A. Clippers	7	0	14.4	.444	.400	**1.000**	2.0	.9	.3	.0	3.0
Career		170	159	36.6	.423	.355	.830	5.8	3.4	1.2	.6	18.7

== Career highlights ==
=== NBA ===
- NBA champion: 2008
- NBA Finals MVP: 2008
- All-NBA Second Team: 2009
- 3-time All-NBA Third Team: 2002, 2003, 2008
- 10-time NBA All-Star: 2002, 2003, 2004, 2005, 2006, 2008, 2009, 2010, 2011, 2012
- NBA All-Rookie First Team: 1999
- NBA 3-Point Contest winner: 2010
- NBA regular-season leader, total points: 2002 (2144)
- NBA regular-season leader, free throws made: 2003 (604)
- NBA 75th Anniversary Team: 2021

=== College ===
- Named First Team All-America by the Associated Press after his junior year at the University of Kansas.
- Named Big Eight Freshman of the Year in 1995–96.
- MVP of the Big 12 Conference tournament in both 1997 and 1998.
- Member of the All-Big 12 First Team in 1997–1998.

=== Other ===
- Member of the US national team in the 2002 FIBA World Championship.
- Member of the 2006 USA Basketball World Championship Team (Did not play due to an elbow injury).
- Home Team Community Service Award (2002)
- Named to Kansas Sports Hall of Fame in 2018

=== Boston Celtics franchise records ===
- Most points scored in a half (including Overtime): 46 (December 1, 2001, 2nd Half vs. New Jersey Nets).
- Most points scored in an overtime period: 13 (December 1, 2001, vs. New Jersey Nets)
- Most three-point field goals made, career: 1578
- Most three-point field goals attempted, career: 4273
- Most free throws made, career: 5808
- Most free throws attempted, career: 7212
- Most free throws made in one game: 20 (November 2, 2002, vs. New York Knicks).
- Most free throws attempted in one game: 24 (November 5, 2005, vs. New York Knicks).
- Most free throws made in one half: 14 (March 2, 2001, vs. Utah Jazz).
- Most free throws made in one season: 627 (2005–06, breaking his own record of 604 set in 2002–03).
- Most free throws attempted in one season: 812 (2005–06, breaking his own record of 753 set in 2002–03).
- Most steals in one game: 9 (tied with Larry Bird; December 3, 1999, vs. Miami Heat).
- Most free throws made without a miss, playoffs: 21 (Game 1, 2003 Eastern Conference First Round).
- Most points scored in one half, playoffs: 32 (Game 4, 2003 Eastern Conference First Round vs. Indiana Pacers).
- Highest scoring average through one month: 33.5 PPG (February 2006).
- Only Celtics player in franchise history to lead the NBA in total points scored in a season, scoring 2,144 points in 2001–02.
- Oldest Celtics player to score 40 points in a game: 35 years, 2 months, and 6 days old (December 19, 2012, vs Cleveland Cavaliers)
- Pierce is the Celtics' second all-time leading scorer behind John Havlicek. He also ranks second in team history in career scoring average, behind Larry Bird.

== See also ==
- List of NBA seasons played leaders
- List of NBA career games played leaders
- List of NBA career scoring leaders
- List of NBA career steals leaders
- List of NBA career turnovers leaders
- List of NBA career personal fouls leaders
- List of NBA career 3-point scoring leaders
- List of NBA career free throw scoring leaders
- List of NBA career minutes played leaders
- List of NBA career playoff scoring leaders
- List of NBA career playoff turnovers leaders
- List of NBA career playoff 3-point scoring leaders
- List of NBA career playoff free throw scoring leaders
- List of NBA single-game steals leaders
