= Sacheverell =

Sacheverell (pronounced /səˈʃɛvərəl/ sə-SHEV-ərəl) is a rare English name of Norman French origin meaning 'roebuck leap'. The diminutive form is "Sachie" or "Sacha". Notable people with the name include:

== As a surname ==
- Henry Sacheverell (1674–1724), English churchman and politician
- Richard Sacheverell (before 1469 – 1534), English politician
- Robert Sacheverell (1669–1714), English politician
- William Sacheverell (1638–1691), English statesman

== As a given or middle name ==
- Sir Ralph Henry Sacheverell Wilmot, 6th Baronet (1875–1918)
- Sir Francis Osbert Sacheverell Sitwell, 5th Baronet (1892–1969), English writer, essayist, and poet, known as Osbert
- Sir Sacheverell Sitwell, 6th Baronet (1897–1988), English writer and art and music critic, younger brother of the 5th Baronet
- Sir Sacheverell Reresby Sitwell, 7th Baronet (1927–2009), English landowner and patron of the arts, son of the 6th Baronet, known as Reresby
- Sir George Reresby Sacheverell Sitwell, 8th Baronet (born 1967), English businessman, nephew of the 7th Baronet, known as George
- William Ronald Sacheverell Sitwell (born 1969), English editor and food journalist, younger brother and heir presumptive of the 8th Baronet

== See also ==
- Sacheverell riots, a 1710 series of riots in response to Henry Sacheverell's prosecution
