= 2011–12 NBA season =

66th NBA season

- League: National Basketball Association
- Sport: Basketball
- Duration: December 25, 2011 – April 26, 2012; April 28 – June 9, 2012 (Playoffs); June 12 – 21, 2012 (Finals)
- Games: 66
- Teams: 30
- TV partner(s): ABC, TNT, ESPN, NBA TV

Draft
- Top draft pick: Kyrie Irving
- Picked by: Cleveland Cavaliers

Regular season
- Top seed: Chicago Bulls
- Season MVP: LeBron James (Miami)
- Top scorer: Kevin Durant (Oklahoma City)

Playoffs
- Eastern champions: Miami Heat
- Eastern runners-up: Boston Celtics
- Western champions: Oklahoma City Thunder
- Western runners-up: San Antonio Spurs

Finals
- Champions: Miami Heat
- Runners-up: Oklahoma City Thunder
- Finals MVP: LeBron James (Miami)

NBA seasons
- ← 2010–11 2012–13 →

The 2011–12 NBA season was the 66th season of the National Basketball Association (NBA). Due to the lockout, the regular season was reduced to 66 games for each team, and began on December 25, 2011, coinciding with Christmas Day. The 2012 NBA All-Star Game was played on February 26, 2012, at Amway Center in Orlando, Florida. The regular season ended on April 26, 2012. The playoffs then began on April 28, and ended on June 21 with the Miami Heat defeating the Oklahoma City Thunder in the 2012 NBA Finals.

== Transactions ==
=== Free agency ===
Free agency started on December 9, 2011.

=== Coaching changes ===
Coaching changes
Off-season
Team	2010–11 coach	2011–12 coach
Los Angeles Lakers	Phil Jackson	Mike Brown
Houston Rockets	Rick Adelman	Kevin McHale
Golden State Warriors	Keith Smart	Mark Jackson
Toronto Raptors	Jay Triano	Dwane Casey
Detroit Pistons	John Kuester	Lawrence Frank
Minnesota Timberwolves	Kurt Rambis	Rick Adelman
In-season
Team	Outgoing coach	Incoming coach
Sacramento Kings	Paul Westphal	Keith Smart
Washington Wizards	Flip Saunders	Randy Wittman
New York Knicks	Mike D'Antoni	Mike Woodson
Portland Trail Blazers	Nate McMillan	Kaleb Canales

==== Off-season ====
- On May 31, the Los Angeles Lakers hired Mike Brown as head coach, replacing Phil Jackson who retired at the end of the previous season.
- On June 1, the Houston Rockets hired Kevin McHale as head coach, replacing Rick Adelman whose contract expired at the end of the previous season.
- On June 6, the Golden State Warriors hired Mark Jackson as head coach, replacing Keith Smart who was fired on April 27.
- On June 21, the Toronto Raptors hired Dallas Mavericks assistant coach Dwane Casey as head coach, replacing Jay Triano, whose contract as head coach expired at the end of the previous season. Triano was retained as a special assistant to the president and general manager.
- On August 3, the Detroit Pistons hired Boston Celtics assistant coach Lawrence Frank as head coach, replacing John Kuester who was fired on June 5.
- On September 28, the Minnesota Timberwolves hired Rick Adelman as head coach, replacing Kurt Rambis who was fired on July 12.

==== In-season ====
- On January 5, the Sacramento Kings fired Paul Westphal and promoted assistant coach Keith Smart to head coach.
- On January 24, the Washington Wizards fired Flip Saunders and promoted assistant coach Randy Wittman to head coach.
- On March 14, the New York Knicks announced the resignation of Mike D'Antoni and promoted assistant Mike Woodson to head coach on an interim basis for the rest of the season.
- On March 15, the Portland Trail Blazers fired Nate McMillan and promoted assistant Kaleb Canales as interim head coach.

== 2011 NBA lockout ==
The lockout was the fourth work stoppage in the history of the NBA. It began at UTC (12:01 am EDT) on July 1, 2011. The main issues dividing the owners and the players were revenue sharing and the structure of the salary cap. During the lockout, teams could not trade, sign or contact players and players couldn't access NBA team facilities, trainers, or staff members. All preseason games (scheduled to begin October 9) and the first six weeks of the regular season (scheduled to begin November 1, through December 15) were canceled. Some players signed contracts to play in other countries, and most had the option to return to the NBA as soon as the lockout ended. On November 26, 2011, after 15 hours of talks, a tentative deal was reached; once officially ratified, the NBA started a revised 2011–12 season. Owners allowed players to have voluntary workouts at team sites starting December 1. On December 8, 2011, the lockout ended when the owners and players ratified a new CBA agreement.

== Preseason ==
Training camp began on December 9. A revised two-game preseason schedule took place.

== Regular season ==
A revised 66-game regular season began on December 25, 2011, with five Christmas Day games, two more than the original schedule. The league built a new schedule from scratch based on available arena dates. In October, the league allowed arenas in Los Angeles and Chicago to reassign NBA dates for other events. The number of games between conferences was affected as was the case in the 1999 lockout, when each team played only five or six interconference games in a 50-game schedule. Normally, each team plays teams in the other conference twice each. Teams played 48 conference games and 18 non-conference games in a 66-game schedule, compared to 52 conference games and 30 non-conference games in a normal 82-game season. Teams played on average two more games per month and also were required to play three-consecutive games at least once in the season. In total, the league had 42 sets of back-to-back-to-back games throughout the season, with 11 teams playing two such sets. The exception was the then champion Dallas Mavericks, who never had a set of 3 consecutive back to backs. The three-game set, or "triple", also occurred during the shortened 1998–99 season, which featured 64 triples and sloppier play due to tired players. Before that, the last occurrence was two decades earlier. On 29 occasions during the season, teams played a stretch of five games in six days. With fewer off days during the season, the level of play was lower due to fatigue, and some older players rested to avoid burnout and recuperate from injuries. When the San Antonio Spurs rested Tim Duncan for a game in March at the end of a back-to-back-to-back, coach Gregg Popovich submitted the description of Duncan's injury as "Old".

=== Standings ===
==== By division ====
Eastern Conference

Atlantic Division	W	L	PCT	GB	Home	Road	Div	GP
y-Boston Celtics	39	27	.591	–	24–9	15–18	8–6	66
x-New York Knicks	36	30	.545	3	22–11	14–19	8–6	66
x-Philadelphia 76ers	35	31	.530	4	19–14	16–17	7–6	66
Toronto Raptors	23	43	.348	16	13–20	10–23	7–8	66
New Jersey Nets	22	44	.333	17	9–24	13–20	5–9	66

Central Division	W	L	PCT	GB	Home	Road	Div	GP
z-Chicago Bulls	50	16	.758	–	26–7	24–9	13–1	66
x-Indiana Pacers	42	24	.636	8	23–10	19–14	9–4	66
Milwaukee Bucks	31	35	.470	19	17–16	14–19	7–8	66
Detroit Pistons	25	41	.379	25	18–15	7–26	4–11	66
Cleveland Cavaliers	21	45	.318	29	11–22	10–23	3–12	66

Southeast Division	W	L	PCT	GB	Home	Road	Div	GP
y-Miami Heat	46	20	.697	–	28–5	18–15	9–5	66
x-Atlanta Hawks	40	26	.606	6	23–10	17–16	11–3	66
x-Orlando Magic	37	29	.561	9	21–12	16–17	8–7	66
Washington Wizards	20	46	.303	26	11–22	9–24	7–7	66
Charlotte Bobcats	7	59	.106	39	4–29	3–30	1–14	66

Western Conference

Northwest Division	W	L	PCT	GB	Home	Road	Div	GP
y-Oklahoma City Thunder	47	19	.712	–	26‍–‍7	21‍–‍12	10–3	66
x-Denver Nuggets	38	28	.576	9.0	20‍–‍13	18‍–‍15	6–7	66
x-Utah Jazz	36	30	.545	11.0	25‍–‍8	11‍–‍22	9–4	66
Portland Trail Blazers	28	38	.424	19.0	20‍–‍13	8‍–‍25	4–10	66
Minnesota Timberwolves	26	40	.394	21.0	13‍–‍20	13‍–‍20	4–9	66

Pacific Division	W	L	PCT	GB	Home	Road	Div	GP
y-Los Angeles Lakers	41	25	.621	–	26‍–‍7	15‍–‍18	9–5	66
x-Los Angeles Clippers	40	26	.606	1.0	24‍–‍9	16‍–‍17	7–7	66
Phoenix Suns	33	33	.500	8.0	19‍–‍14	14‍–‍19	9–5	66
Golden State Warriors	23	43	.348	18.0	12‍–‍21	11‍–‍22	7–8	66
Sacramento Kings	22	44	.333	19.0	16‍–‍17	6‍–‍27	3–10	66

Southwest Division	W	L	PCT	GB	Home	Road	Div	GP
c-San Antonio Spurs	50	16	.758	–	28‍–‍5	22‍–‍11	12–4	66
x-Memphis Grizzlies	41	25	.621	9.0	26‍–‍7	15‍–‍18	7–8	66
x-Dallas Mavericks	36	30	.545	14.0	23‍–‍10	13‍–‍20	8–5	66
Houston Rockets	34	32	.515	16.0	22‍–‍11	12‍–‍21	6–8	66
New Orleans Hornets	21	45	.318	29.0	11‍–‍22	10‍–‍23	3–11	66

==== By conference ====
Eastern Conference
#	Team	W	L	PCT	GB	GP
1	z-Chicago Bulls	50	16	.758	–	66
2	y-Miami Heat *	46	20	.697	4.0	66
3	x-Indiana Pacers *	42	24	.636	8.0	66
4	y-Boston Celtics	39	27	.591	11.0	66
5	x-Atlanta Hawks	40	26	.606	10.0	66
6	x-Orlando Magic	37	29	.561	13.0	66
7	x-New York Knicks	36	30	.545	14.0	66
8	x-Philadelphia 76ers	35	31	.530	15.0	66
9	Milwaukee Bucks	31	35	.470	19.0	66
10	Detroit Pistons	25	41	.379	25.0	66
11	Toronto Raptors	23	43	.348	27.0	66
12	New Jersey Nets	22	44	.333	28.0	66
13	Cleveland Cavaliers	21	45	.318	29.0	66
14	Washington Wizards	20	46	.303	30.0	66
15	Charlotte Bobcats	7	59	.106	43.0	66

Western Conference
#	Team	W	L	PCT	GB	GP
1	c-San Antonio Spurs *	50	16	.758	–	66
2	y-Oklahoma City Thunder *	47	19	.712	3.0	66
3	y-Los Angeles Lakers *	41	25	.621	9.0	66
4	x-Memphis Grizzlies	41	25	.621	9.0	66
5	x-Los Angeles Clippers	40	26	.606	10.0	66
6	x-Denver Nuggets	38	28	.576	12.0	66
7	x-Dallas Mavericks	36	30	.545	14.0	66
8	x-Utah Jazz	36	30	.545	14.0	66
9	Houston Rockets	34	32	.515	16.0	66
10	Phoenix Suns	33	33	.500	17.0	66
11	Portland Trail Blazers	28	38	.424	22.0	66
12	Minnesota Timberwolves	26	40	.394	24.0	66
13	Golden State Warriors	23	43	.348	27.0	66
14	Sacramento Kings	22	44	.333	28.0	66
15	New Orleans Hornets	21	45	.318	29.0	66

Notes

- z – Clinched home court advantage for the entire playoffs
- c – Clinched home court advantage for the conference playoffs
- x – Clinched playoff spot
- y – Clinched division title

==== Tiebreakers ====
- Chicago clinched the #1 overall seed over San Antonio based on head-to-head record (1–0).

Western Conference

- The Los Angeles Lakers clinched #3 seed over Memphis upon winning the Pacific Division.
- Dallas clinched #7 seed over Utah based on head-to-head record (3–1).

== Playoffs ==
The 2012 NBA playoffs began on April 28, and concluded on June 21, 2012, when the Miami Heat defeated the Oklahoma City Thunder.

The Chicago Bulls were eliminated after losing Derrick Rose and Joakim Noah to injuries, and the New York Knicks lost to the Miami Heat while losing Baron Davis and Iman Shumpert to knee injuries. The Heat were not immune, losing Chris Bosh for most of the playoffs en route to their championship. Commissioner David Stern initially said there was no connection between the injuries and the 66-game schedule compressed into 124 days; however, he backed off those comments a week later, saying more research was needed.

This season also marked the final time that Kobe Bryant appeared in the playoffs, as an Achilles injury the following season prevented him from joining the Lakers for the 2013 first round.

=== Bracket ===
First Round	Conference Semifinals
E1	Chicago*	2
E8	Philadelphia	4
E8	Philadelphia	3
E4	Boston*	4
E4	Boston*	4
E5	Atlanta	2
Eastern Conference
E3	Indiana	4
E6	Orlando	1
E3	Indiana	2
E2	Miami*	4
E2	Miami*	4
E7	New York	1
W1	San Antonio*	4
W8	Utah	0
W1	San Antonio*	4
W5	LA Clippers	0
W4	Memphis	3
W5	LA Clippers	4
Western Conference
W3	LA Lakers*	4
W6	Denver	3
W3	LA Lakers*	1
W2	Oklahoma City*	4
W2	Oklahoma City*	4
W7	Dallas	0

Conference Finals
E4	Boston*	3
E2	Miami*	4
W1	San Antonio*	2
W2	Oklahoma City*	4

NBA Finals
E2	Miami*	4
W2	Oklahoma City*	1

- * Division winner
- Bold Series winner
- Italic Team with home-court advantage

== Statistics leaders ==
=== Individual statistic leaders ===
Category	Player	Team	Statistics
Points per game	Kevin Durant	Oklahoma City Thunder	28.0
Rebounds per game	Dwight Howard	Orlando Magic	14.5
Assists per game	Rajon Rondo	Boston Celtics	11.7
Steals per game	Chris Paul	Los Angeles Clippers	2.53
Blocks per game	Serge Ibaka	Oklahoma City Thunder	3.65
Turnovers per game	Deron Williams	New Jersey Nets	4.0
Fouls per game	DeMarcus Cousins	Sacramento Kings	4.0
Minutes per game	Luol Deng	Chicago Bulls	39.4
Efficiency per game	LeBron James	Miami Heat	29.9
FG%	Tyson Chandler	New York Knicks	67.9%
FT%	Jamal Crawford	Portland Trail Blazers	92.7%
3FG%	Steve Novak	New York Knicks	47.2%
Double-Doubles	Kevin Love	Minnesota Timberwolves	48
Triple-Doubles	Rajon Rondo	Boston Celtics	6

=== Individual game highs ===
Category	Player	Team	Statistics
Points	Deron Williams	New Jersey Nets	57
Rebounds	Andrew Bynum	Los Angeles Lakers	30
Assists	Rajon Rondo	Boston Celtics	20
Assists	Deron Williams	New Jersey Nets	20
Steals	Ty Lawson	Denver Nuggets	8
Steals	Paul Millsap	Utah Jazz	8
Steals	Chris Paul	Los Angeles Clippers	8
Steals	Tony Allen	Memphis Grizzlies	8
Blocks	Serge Ibaka	Oklahoma City Thunder	11
Three Pointers	Nicolas Batum	Portland Trail Blazers	9
Three Pointers	Jason Richardson	Orlando Magic	9
Three Pointers	Ben Gordon	Detroit Pistons	9

=== Team statistic leaders ===
Category	Team	Statistics
Points per game	Denver Nuggets	108.7
Rebounds per game	Chicago Bulls	46.7
Assists per game	Denver Nuggets	24.0
Steals per game	Memphis Grizzlies	10.3
Blocks per game	Oklahoma City Thunder	8.2
Turnovers per game	Oklahoma City Thunder	16.4
Fouls per game	Toronto Raptors	23.2
FG%	San Antonio Spurs	47.8%
FT%	Oklahoma City Thunder	80.6%
3FG%	San Antonio Spurs	39.3%
+/-	Chicago Bulls	8.2

== Notable occurrences ==
- On December 8, 2011, the New Orleans Hornets, the Los Angeles Lakers and the Houston Rockets agreed to a trade that would send Chris Paul to Los Angeles. NBA commissioner David Stern nullified the trade, saying the Hornets were better off keeping Paul than accepting the terms of the deal. The league had acquired the Hornets from former owner George Shinn, and the commissioner's office has final authority over all management decisions. Several of the other owners, who co-own the Hornets, also opposed the deal. Cleveland Cavaliers owner Dan Gilbert felt that the Lakers were acquiring the best player in the deal, Paul, and reducing their salary to possibly acquire Dwight Howard. Owners believed the trade would have sent a bad message coming out of the lockout, where one goal was to give small-market teams a chance to keep their players. Paul had long been speculated to be leaving the Hornets as a free agent after the end of the season. Magic Johnson said the trade denial "sends a bad message to fans", and Dwyane Wade called the situation a "mess". The three teams involved in the trade attempted to lobby the league to reverse its ruling as well as reconstruct the deal that would satisfy the league, only to be met by resistance from the league which wanted the Hornets to receive more youth and draft picks. Later, the Lakers pulled out of the trade talk. Five days later, Paul was finally traded to the Los Angeles Clippers.
- The Toronto Raptors became the first North American sports franchise to apply 3D application to its hardwood floor, which when seen by the players and in-arena spectators appears flat, but when seen by the television audience appears popped up. It made its debut in a pre-season game against the Boston Celtics at Air Canada Centre on December 18. On December 21, when the two teams met at the TD Garden, the Celtics became the first team to apply their Twitter account on their trademark parquet floor.
- The Raptors also became the first NBA team to unveil camouflaged uniforms, which they wore for the first time on March 21 against the Chicago Bulls as a tribute to the Canadian Forces.
- Due to a career-ending knee injury, Portland Trail Blazers guard and three-time All-Star Brandon Roy announced his retirement, after only five seasons, on December 9, 2011. Roy's retirement was brief, however, as he joined the Minnesota Timberwolves the next season.
- A new shot-clock rule was put into place. Upon reaching the five-second mark, tenths of a second are displayed in order to accurately determine last-second shots.
- The Conseco Fieldhouse, the arena of the Indiana Pacers was renamed to Bankers Life Fieldhouse. On December 26, 2011, they played their first game in the newly named arena against the Detroit Pistons. Likewise the Oklahoma City Thunder's arena was renamed the Chesapeake Energy Arena, after Chesapeake Energy acquired naming rights.
- Final season of the Nets playing in New Jersey. They spent a total of 36 seasons in New Jersey in four different locations (Teaneck Armory, Piscataway's Rutgers Athletic Center, East Rutherford's Izod Center (Brendan Byrne and Continental Airlines Arena), and Newark's Prudential Center) from 1977 to 2012. They relocated to Brooklyn, a borough of New York City, the next season at the Barclays Center, becoming the first "Big Four" sports franchise in Brooklyn since the Brooklyn Dodgers left in 1957.
- All four active NBA teams formerly in the American Basketball Association (New Jersey Nets (as the New York Nets), San Antonio Spurs (as the Texas Chaparrals), Denver Nuggets, Indiana Pacers) along with the Minnesota Timberwolves (as the Minnesota Muskies), the Memphis Grizzlies (as the Memphis Tams), the Los Angeles Clippers (as the Los Angeles Stars), the Charlotte Bobcats (as the Carolina Cougars), and the Miami Heat (as the Miami Floridians) participated in NBA Hardwood Classics Nights as a tribute to the ABA wearing throwback jerseys.
- On February 19 in an overtime win vs. the Denver Nuggets, Kevin Durant scored 51, Russell Westbrook scored 40, and Serge Ibaka had a triple-double marking the first time that a player scored 50+ points, with another scoring 40+ points, and another having a triple-double in the same game.
- On March 25, the Atlanta Hawks defeated the Utah Jazz 139–133 at Philips Arena in the first quadruple-overtime game since November 14, 1997, when the Phoenix Suns defeated the Portland Trail Blazers 140–139.
- On April 13, Tom Benson, who owns the NFL's New Orleans Saints, agreed to buy the Hornets from the NBA for $338 million.
- On April 26, the New Jersey Nets played their last game against the Toronto Raptors before moving to Brooklyn, New York.
- The Charlotte Bobcats set the single–season NBA record for the worst winning percentage, going 7–59 for a .106 winning percentage. The 1972–73 Philadelphia 76ers previously held the record with .110, but they played the typical 82–game schedule.
- Kevin Durant became the seventh player to win three consecutive scoring titles, and the first since Michael Jordan notched the last scoring title of his career in the 1997–98 season.
- The Philadelphia 76ers became the fifth eighth seed to defeat a top seed in the playoffs, winning the first round series in six games over the Chicago Bulls. The Bulls lost reigning MVP Derrick Rose to an ACL injury in Game 1, who consequently missed the rest of the series.

== Milestones and records ==
=== Individual ===
- December 31: 800 coaching wins – San Antonio Spurs head coach Gregg Popovich became the 14th coach to register 800 wins in a 104–89 win over the Utah Jazz, putting him second all-time behind Jerry Sloan for coaching victories with one team.
- January 1: Youngest player to 28,000 points – Los Angeles Lakers guard Kobe Bryant scored his 28,000th career point in a 99–90 loss to the Denver Nuggets. Bryant was 33 years and 131 days old.
- January 12: Most free throw attempts in a game. Orlando Magic center Dwight Howard attempted a regular season record 39 free throws against the Golden State Warriors, breaking Wilt Chamberlain's record of 34 set in 1962. (Shaquille O'Neal attempted 39 free throws in Game 2 of the 2000 NBA Finals.) Howard entered the game making 42 percent of his free throws for the season and just below 60 percent for his career. The Warriors fouled Howard intentionally throughout the game. Howard made 21 of the 39 attempts, and he finished with 45 points and 23 rebounds in the Magic's 117–109 victory.
- January 12: Phoenix Suns point guard Steve Nash scored his 16,000th career point in a 101–90 loss at the Cleveland Cavaliers.
- January 13: Dallas Mavericks power forward Dirk Nowitzki scored his 23,000th career point in a 102–72 win at the Milwaukee Bucks.
- January 18: New York Knicks small forward Carmelo Anthony scored his 15,000th career point in an 88–91 loss to the Phoenix Suns.
- January 20: Los Angeles Lakers power forward Pau Gasol scored his 14,000th career point in an 80–92 loss to the Orlando Magic.
- January 23: Chicago Bulls shooting guard Richard Hamilton scored his 15,000th career point in a 110–95 win against the New Jersey Nets.
- January 28: Los Angeles Lakers shooting guard Kobe Bryant with his 7,161st free throw broke the Lakers all-time free throw record, breaking Jerry West's record in a 100–89 loss to the Milwaukee Bucks.
- January 29: Los Angeles Lakers shooting guard Kobe Bryant with his 9,936th field goal broke the Lakers all-time field goals record held by Kareem Abdul-Jabbar just one day after breaking Jerry West's team free throw record in a 106–101 win over the Minnesota Timberwolves.
- February 3: Youngest player to 18,000 points – Miami Heat forward LeBron James scored his 18,000th career point in a 99–79 win against the Philadelphia 76ers. James was 28 years and 35 days old. This record was previously held by Kobe Bryant.
- February 6: Bryant 5th on NBA all-time scoring list. Los Angeles Lakers shooting guard Kobe Bryant passed Shaquille O'Neal after scoring his 28,597th point during the first half of a 95–90 loss to the Philadelphia 76ers.
- February 6: San Antonio Spurs power forward Tim Duncan scored his 22,000th career point in an 89–84 win against the Memphis Grizzlies.
- February 10: Los Angeles Lakers shooting guard Kobe Bryant made his 10,000th career field goal in an 85–92 loss to the New York Knicks.
- February 11: San Antonio Spurs point guard Tony Parker scored his 13,000th career point in a 103–89 win against the New Jersey Nets.
- February 12: Washington Wizards forward Rashard Lewis scored his 15,000th career point in a 98–77 win against the Detroit Pistons.
- February 20: Nowitzki 20th on NBA all-time scoring list. Dallas Mavericks forward Dirk Nowitzki passed Robert Parish after scoring his 23,335th point during the second half of an 89–73 victory over the Boston Celtics.
- February 20: Kidd 2nd on the NBA all-time steals list. Dallas Mavericks point guard Jason Kidd recorded career steal 2,515 to move past Michael Jordan.
- March 4: Boston Celtics small forward Paul Pierce scored his 22,000th career point in a 115–111 win against the New York Knicks.
- March 4: New Jersey Nets franchise record: most points in a game. Deron Williams scored 57 in a 104–101 win against the Charlotte Bobcats.
- March 9: Youngest player to 29,000 points. Los Angeles Lakers shooting guard Kobe Bryant scored his 29,000th career point in a 105–102 victory against the Minnesota Timberwolves. Bryant was 33 years and 200 days old. This record was previously held by Wilt Chamberlain.
- March 17: Boston Celtics power forward Kevin Garnett made his 5,000th assist in a 98–91 loss to the Denver Nuggets.
- March 19: Chicago Bulls' Tom Thibodeau became the fastest coach in NBA history to earn 100 career victories, doing so on his 130th game as a head coach.
- March 20: Phoenix Suns small forward Grant Hill scored his 17,000th career point in a 95–99 loss against the Miami Heat.
- March 22: Pierce 26th on the NBA all-time scoring list. Boston Celtics small forward Paul Pierce passed Clyde Drexler in a 100–91 win against the Milwaukee Bucks.
- March 23: Minnesota Timberwolves franchise record; most points in a game. Kevin Love scored 51 in a 140–149 double-overtime loss to the Oklahoma City Thunder.
- March 24: Nowitzki 19th on the NBA all-time scoring list. Dallas Mavericks power forward Dirk Nowitzki passed Charles Barkley for 19th on all-time scoring list after scoring his 23,758th point in a 101–99 victory over the Houston Rockets.
- March 27: Bryant 2nd on the all-time list of points scored for a single franchise: Los Angeles Lakers shooting guard Kobe Bryant passed Michael Jordan for second most points scored by a player for a single franchise after scoring 30 points in a 104–101 victory over the Golden State Warriors.
- March 31: Cleveland Cavaliers power/small forward Antawn Jamison scored his 19,000th career point in a 75–91 loss to the New York Knicks.
- April 2: Los Angeles Clippers franchise record: most 3-pointers in a game. Los Angeles Clippers shooting guard Randy Foye scored 8 3-pointers in a game in a 94–75 win over the Dallas Mavericks.
- April 11: San Antonio Spurs shooting guard Manu Ginóbili scored his 10,000th career point in an 84–98 loss to the Los Angeles Lakers.
- April 15: Dallas Mavericks power forward Dirk Nowitzki scored his 24,000th career point in a 108–112 loss to the Los Angeles Lakers.
- April 19: Miami Heat small forward LeBron James scored his 19,000th career point in an 83–72 win against the Chicago Bulls.
- April 21: Nash 5th on the NBA all-time assist list. Phoenix Suns point guard Steve Nash passed Oscar Robertson for 5th on all time assist list after passing his 9,888th assist in a 107–118 loss to the Denver Nuggets.
- April 23: Memphis Grizzlies franchise record: Most steals in a game: Memphis Grizzlies shooting guard Tony Allen made the most steals in franchise history in a game with eight in a 104–99 win over the Cleveland Cavaliers.
- April 26: NBA Record: Phoenix Suns shooting guard Josh Childress broke the record for the most minutes played in one season without making a free throw with 491 minutes played this season.

=== Team ===
- April 26: NBA Record: Charlotte Bobcats set the record for worst winning percentage in a season at 0.106 (7–59), surpassing the record previously held by the 1972–73 Philadelphia 76ers. In doing so, they also set a record for worst home winning percentage at 0.121 (4–29), beating out the record previously held by the 1947–48 Providence Steamrollers.
- April 26: NBA Record: San Antonio Spurs finish the season with a 50–16 record, in doing so they won at least 50 games for the 13th straight season.

== Awards ==
=== Yearly awards ===
- Most Valuable Player: LeBron James, Miami Heat
- Defensive Player of the Year: Tyson Chandler, New York Knicks
- Rookie of the Year: Kyrie Irving, Cleveland Cavaliers
- Sixth Man of the Year: James Harden, Oklahoma City Thunder
- Most Improved Player: Ryan Anderson, Orlando Magic
- Coach of the Year: Gregg Popovich, San Antonio Spurs
- Executive of the Year: Larry Bird, Indiana Pacers
- Sportsmanship Award: Jason Kidd, Dallas Mavericks
- J. Walter Kennedy Citizenship Award: Pau Gasol, Los Angeles Lakers

- All-NBA First Team:
  - F LeBron James, Miami Heat
  - F Kevin Durant, Oklahoma City Thunder
  - C Dwight Howard, Orlando Magic
  - G Kobe Bryant, Los Angeles Lakers
  - G Chris Paul, Los Angeles Clippers
- All-NBA Second Team:
  - F Kevin Love, Minnesota Timberwolves
  - F Blake Griffin, Los Angeles Clippers
  - C Andrew Bynum, Los Angeles Lakers
  - G Tony Parker, San Antonio Spurs
  - G Russell Westbrook, Oklahoma City Thunder
- All-NBA Third Team:
  - F Carmelo Anthony, New York Knicks
  - F Dirk Nowitzki, Dallas Mavericks
  - C Tyson Chandler, New York Knicks
  - G Dwyane Wade, Miami Heat
  - G Rajon Rondo, Boston Celtics

- NBA All-Defensive First Team:
  - F LeBron James, Miami Heat
  - F Serge Ibaka, Oklahoma City Thunder
  - C Dwight Howard, Orlando Magic
  - G Chris Paul, Los Angeles Clippers
  - G Tony Allen, Memphis Grizzlies
- NBA All-Defensive Second Team:
  - F Kevin Garnett, Boston Celtics
  - F Luol Deng, Chicago Bulls
  - C Tyson Chandler, New York Knicks
  - G Rajon Rondo, Boston Celtics
  - G Kobe Bryant, Los Angeles Lakers

- NBA All-Rookie First Team:
  - Kyrie Irving, Cleveland Cavaliers
  - Ricky Rubio, Minnesota Timberwolves
  - Kenneth Faried, Denver Nuggets
  - Klay Thompson, Golden State Warriors
  - Kawhi Leonard, San Antonio Spurs
  - Iman Shumpert, New York Knicks
  - Brandon Knight, Detroit Pistons
- NBA All-Rookie Second Team:
  - Isaiah Thomas, Sacramento Kings
  - MarShon Brooks, New Jersey Nets
  - Chandler Parsons, Houston Rockets
  - Tristan Thompson, Cleveland Cavaliers
  - Derrick Williams, Minnesota Timberwolves

=== Players of the week ===
The following players were named the Eastern and Western Conference Players of the Week.

Week	Eastern Conference	Western Conference	Ref.
Dec. 25 – Jan. 1	LeBron James (Miami Heat) (1/6)	Kevin Durant (Oklahoma City Thunder) (1/3)	
Jan. 2 – Jan. 8	LeBron James (Miami Heat) (2/6)	Kobe Bryant (Los Angeles Lakers) (1/2)	
Jan. 9 – Jan. 15	Derrick Rose (Chicago Bulls) (1/2)	Kobe Bryant (Los Angeles Lakers) (2/2)	
Jan. 16 – Jan. 22	Dwight Howard (Orlando Magic) (1/1)	Marc Gasol (Memphis Grizzlies) (1/1)	
Jan. 23 – Jan. 29	LeBron James (Miami Heat) (3/6)	Russell Westbrook (Oklahoma City Thunder) (1/2)	
Jan. 30 – Feb. 5	Paul Pierce (Boston Celtics) (1/2)	Tony Parker (San Antonio Spurs) (1/1)	
Feb. 6 – Feb. 12	Jeremy Lin (New York Knicks) (1/1)	Russell Westbrook (Oklahoma City Thunder) (2/2)	
Feb. 13 – Feb. 19	LeBron James (Miami Heat) (4/6)	Kevin Durant (Oklahoma City Thunder) (2/3)	
Feb. 27 – Mar. 4	Derrick Rose (Chicago Bulls) (2/2)	Ty Lawson (Denver Nuggets) (1/1)	
Mar. 5 – Mar. 11	Ersan İlyasova (Milwaukee Bucks) (1/1)	Monta Ellis (Golden State Warriors) (1/1)	
Mar. 12 – Mar. 18	Drew Gooden (Milwaukee Bucks) (1/1)	Andrew Bynum (Los Angeles Lakers) (1/2)	
Mar. 19 – Mar. 25	Joe Johnson (Atlanta Hawks) (1/1)	Kevin Durant (Oklahoma City Thunder) (3/3)	
Mar. 26 – Apr. 1	Paul Pierce (Boston Celtics) (2/2)	Chris Paul (Los Angeles Clippers) (1/1)	
Apr. 2 – Apr. 8	LeBron James (Miami Heat) (5/6)	Goran Dragić (Houston Rockets) (1/1)	
Apr. 9 – Apr. 15	Kevin Garnett (Boston Celtics) (1/1)	Andrew Bynum (Los Angeles Lakers) (2/2)	
Apr. 16 – Apr. 22	LeBron James (Miami Heat) (6/6)	Al Jefferson (Utah Jazz) (1/1)	

=== Players of the month ===
The following players were named the Eastern and Western Conference Players of the Month.

Month	Eastern Conference	Western Conference	Ref.
December – January	LeBron James (Miami Heat) (1/2)	Kobe Bryant (Los Angeles Lakers) (1/1)	
February	LeBron James (Miami Heat) (2/2)	Kevin Durant (Oklahoma City Thunder) (1/2)	
March	Paul Pierce (Boston Celtics) (1/1)	Kevin Durant (Oklahoma City Thunder) (2/2)	
April	Carmelo Anthony (New York Knicks) (1/1)	Chris Paul (Los Angeles Clippers) (1/1)	

=== Rookies of the month ===
The following players were named the Eastern and Western Conference Rookies of the Month.

Month	Eastern Conference	Western Conference	Ref.
December – January	Kyrie Irving (Cleveland Cavaliers) (1/3)	Ricky Rubio (Minnesota Timberwolves) (1/1)	
February	Kyrie Irving (Cleveland Cavaliers) (2/3)	Isaiah Thomas (Sacramento Kings) (1/2)	
March	Kyrie Irving (Cleveland Cavaliers) (3/3)	Isaiah Thomas (Sacramento Kings) (2/2)	
April	Ivan Johnson (Atlanta Hawks) (1/1)	Kenneth Faried (Denver Nuggets) (1/1)	

=== Coaches of the month ===
The following coaches were named the Eastern and Western Conference Coaches of the Month.

Month	Eastern Conference	Western Conference	Ref.
December – January	Tom Thibodeau (Chicago Bulls) (1/2)	Scott Brooks (Oklahoma City Thunder) (1/1)	
February	Erik Spoelstra (Miami Heat) (1/1)	Gregg Popovich (San Antonio Spurs) (1/2)	
March	Tom Thibodeau (Chicago Bulls) (2/2)	Gregg Popovich (San Antonio Spurs) (2/2)	
April	Frank Vogel (Indiana Pacers) (1/1)	Lionel Hollins (Memphis Grizzlies) (1/1)	

=== Community Assist Award ===
The following players won the Community Assist Award.

Month	Player	Ref.
February	Wesley Matthews (Portland Trail Blazers)	
March	Gerald Henderson Jr. (Charlotte Bobcats)	
April	Rudy Gay (Memphis Grizzlies)	
May	Pau Gasol (Los Angeles Lakers)	

== See also ==
- List of NBA regular season records
