= List of 2011–12 NBA season transactions =

This is a list of all personnel changes for the 2011 NBA off-season and 2011–12 NBA season.

== Retirement ==
Date	Name	Team(s) played (years)	Age	Notes	Ref.
April 18	Jason Williams	Sacramento Kings (1998–2001); Memphis Grizzlies (2001–2005; 2011); Miami Heat (2005–2008); Orlando Magic (2009–2011)	35	Previously retired in September 2008 and came out from retirement in August 2009.	
April 26	Jarron Collins	Utah Jazz (2001–2009); Phoenix Suns (2009–2010); Los Angeles Clippers (2011); Portland Trail Blazers (2011)	32		
June 3	Shaquille O'Neal	Orlando Magic (1992–1996); Los Angeles Lakers (1996–2004); Miami Heat (2004–2008); Phoenix Suns (2008–2009); Cleveland Cavaliers (2009–2010); Boston Celtics (2010–2011)	39		
June 18	Trajan Langdon	Cleveland Cavaliers (1999–2002)	35		
July 20	Yao Ming	Houston Rockets (2002–2011)	30	Retired due to frequent foot and ankle injuries.	
September 2	Radoslav Nesterović	Minnesota Timberwolves (1999–2003); San Antonio Spurs (2003–2006); Toronto Raptors (2006–2008, 2009–2010); Indiana Pacers (2008–2009)	35		
September 24	Travis Hansen	Atlanta Hawks (2003–2004)	33	Played overseas	
September 30	Žydrūnas Ilgauskas	Cleveland Cavaliers (1996–2010); Miami Heat (2010–2011)	36		
December 7	Dan Dickau	Atlanta Hawks (2002–2004); Portland Trail Blazers (2004, 2006–2007); Dallas Mavericks (2004); New Orleans Hornets (2004–2005); Boston Celtics (2005–2006); Los Angeles Clippers (2007–2008)	33	Was hired as a player development assistant for the Trail Blazers.	
December 10	Brandon Roy	Portland Trail Blazers (2006–2011); Minnesota Timberwolves (2012–13)	27	Retired due to a degenerative knee condition. Waived by the Blazers on December 15. Came out of retirement for the 2012–13 season to play for the Timberwolves. Re-retired after that season.	
December 18	Sean Marks	Toronto Raptors (1998–2000); Miami Heat (2001–2003); San Antonio Spurs (2003–2006); Phoenix Suns (2006–2008); New Orleans Hornets (2008–2010); Portland Trail Blazers (2010–2011)	36		
December 20	Peja Stojaković	Sacramento Kings (1998–2006); Indiana Pacers (2006); New Orleans Hornets (2006–2010); Toronto Raptors (2010–2011); Dallas Mavericks (2011)	34		
December 20	Antonio McDyess	Denver Nuggets (1995–1997; 1998–2002); Phoenix Suns (1997–1998; 2004); New York Knicks (2002–2004); Detroit Pistons (2004–2009); San Antonio Spurs (2009–2011)	37	Waived by the Spurs on December 19.	
December 23	Theo Ratliff	Detroit Pistons (1995–1997; 2008); Philadelphia 76ers (1997–2001; 2008–2009); Atlanta Hawks (2001–2004); Portland Trail Blazers (2004–2006); Boston Celtics (2006–2007); Minnesota Timberwolves (2007–2008); San Antonio Spurs (2009–2010); Charlotte Bobcats (2010); Los Angeles Lakers (2010–2011)	38		
January 19	Greg Ostertag	Utah Jazz (1995–2004, 2005–2006); Sacramento Kings (2004–2005)	38	Second retirement. Retired due to knee trouble	
March 12	T. J. Ford	Milwaukee Bucks (2003–2006); Toronto Raptors (2006–2008); Indiana Pacers (2008–2011); San Antonio Spurs (2011–2012)	28	Retired due to recurring neck and spine injuries. Remained on the Spurs roster after retirement. Traded to the Golden State Warriors on March 15. Waived by the Warriors on March 17.	
March 21	Jeff Foster	Indiana Pacers (1999–2012)	35	Retired due to chronic back problems	
April 7	Antoine Walker	Boston Celtics (1996–2003, 2005); Dallas Mavericks (2003–2004); Atlanta Hawks (2004–2005); Miami Heat (2005–2007); Minnesota Timberwolves (2007–2008)	35		

== Front office movements ==
=== Head coach changes ===
Off-season

Date	Team	Outgoing head coach	Reason for departure	Incoming head coach	Last coaching position	Ref.
May 31	Los Angeles Lakers	Phil Jackson	Retired	Mike Brown	Cleveland Cavaliers head coach (2005–2010)	
June 1	Houston Rockets	Rick Adelman	Contract expired	Kevin McHale	Minnesota Timberwolves head coach (2008–2009)	
June 6	Golden State Warriors	Keith Smart	Fired	Mark Jackson	None	
June 21	Toronto Raptors	Jay Triano	Contract expired	Dwane Casey	Dallas Mavericks assistant coach (2008–2011)	
August 3	Detroit Pistons	John Kuester	Fired	Lawrence Frank	Boston Celtics assistant coach (2010–2011)	
September 28	Minnesota Timberwolves	Kurt Rambis	Fired	Rick Adelman	Houston Rockets head coach (2007–2011)	

In-season

Date	Team	Outgoing head coach	Reason for departure	Incoming head coach	Last coaching position	Ref.
January 5	Sacramento Kings	Paul Westphal	Fired	Keith Smart	Sacramento Kings assistant coach (2011–2012)	
January 24	Washington Wizards	Flip Saunders	Fired	Randy Wittman	Washington Wizards assistant coach (2009–2012)	
March 14	New York Knicks	Mike D'Antoni	Resigned	Mike Woodson	New York Knicks assistant coach (2011–2012)	
March 15	Portland Trail Blazers	Nate McMillan	Fired	Kaleb Canales (interim)	Portland Trail Blazers assistant coach (2009–2012)	

=== General manager changes ===
Off-season

Date	Team	Outgoing general manager	Reason for departure	Incoming general manager	Last managerial position	Ref.
May 23	Portland Trail Blazers	Rich Cho	Fired	Chad Buchanan	None	
June 3	New York Knicks	Donnie Walsh	Contract expired	Glen Grunwald	Toronto Raptors general manager (1998–2004)	
June 14	Charlotte Bobcats	Rod Higgins	Promotion	Rich Cho	Portland Trail Blazers general manager (2010–2011)	
October 18	Philadelphia 76ers	Ed Stefanski	Fired	Rod Thorn	New Jersey Nets general manager (2000–2010)	

In-season

Date	Team	Outgoing general manager	Reason for departure	Incoming general manager	Last managerial position	Ref.
April 24	Golden State Warriors	Larry Riley	Demotion	Bob Myers	None	

== Player movement ==
The following is a list of player movement via free agency and trades.

=== Trades ===
June
June 23 (Draft-day trades)	Three-team trade	
June 23 (Draft-day trades)	To Milwaukee Bucks: Stephen Jackson (from Charlotte); Shaun Livingston (from Charlotte); Beno Udrih (from Sacramento); Draft rights to 19th pick Tobias Harris (from Charlotte)	To Sacramento Kings: John Salmons (from Milwaukee); Draft rights to 10th pick Jimmer Fredette (from Milwaukee)
June 23 (Draft-day trades)	To Charlotte Bobcats: Corey Maggette (from Milwaukee); Draft rights to 7th pick Bismack Biyombo (from Sacramento)	
June 23 (Draft-day trades)	To Indiana Pacers: George Hill	To San Antonio Spurs: Draft rights to 15th pick Kawhi Leonard; Draft rights to 42nd pick Dāvis Bertāns; Draft rights to Erazem Lorbek
June 23 (Draft-day trades)	To Minnesota Timberwolves: Brad Miller; Draft rights to 23rd pick Nikola Mirotić; Draft rights to 38th pick Chandler Parsons; Future first-round pick	To Houston Rockets: Jonny Flynn; Draft rights to 20th pick Donatas Motiejūnas; 2012 Minnesota second-round pick
June 23 (Draft-day trades)	To Minnesota Timberwolves: Draft rights to 28th pick Norris Cole; Draft rights to 43rd pick Malcolm Lee; Cash considerations	To Chicago Bulls: Draft rights to 23rd pick Nikola Mirotić
June 23 (Draft-day trades)	To Minnesota Timberwolves: Draft rights to 31st pick Bojan Bogdanović; 2014 second-round pick; Cash considerations	To Miami Heat: Draft rights to 28th pick Norris Cole
June 23 (Draft-day trades)	To Minnesota Timberwolves: 2013 New Jersey second-round pick; Cash considerations	To New Jersey Nets: Draft rights to 31st pick Bojan Bogdanović
June 23 (Draft-day trades)	To Minnesota Timberwolves: Cash considerations	To Houston Rockets: Draft rights to 38th pick Chandler Parsons
June 23 (Draft-day trades)	To Boston Celtics: Draft rights to 27th pick JaJuan Johnson; 2014 New Jersey second-round pick	To New Jersey Nets: Draft rights to 25th pick Marshon Brooks
June 23 (Draft-day trades)	Three-team trade	
June 23 (Draft-day trades)	To Portland Trail Blazers: Raymond Felton (from Denver); Draft rights to 57th pick Tanguy Ngombo (from Dallas)	To Denver Nuggets: Andre Miller (from Portland); Draft rights to 26th pick Jordan Hamilton (from Dallas)
June 23 (Draft-day trades)	To Dallas Mavericks: Rudy Fernández (from Portland); Draft rights to Petteri Koponen (from Portland)	
June 23 (Draft-day trades)	To New Orleans Hornets: Cash considerations	To New York Knicks: Draft rights to 45th pick Josh Harrellson
June 23 (Draft-day trades)	To Cleveland Cavaliers: 2013 second-round pick; 2014 second-round pick	To Orlando Magic: Draft rights to 32nd pick Justin Harper
June 23 (Draft-day trades)	To Charlotte Bobcats: Cash considerations	To Golden State Warriors: Draft rights to 39th pick Jeremy Tyler
June 23 (Draft-day trades)	To Los Angeles Lakers: Future second-round pick	To Denver Nuggets: Draft rights to 56th pick Chukwudiebere Maduabum
June 27	To Minnesota Timberwolves: Draft rights to 57th pick Tanguy Ngombo	To Portland Trail Blazers: Future second-round pick
June 30	To Cleveland Cavaliers: Omri Casspi; 2012 Sacramento protected first-round pick (Note: Pick is protected 1-14 in 2012, 1-13 in 2013, 1-12 in 2014, and 1-10 in 2015-2017; if not conveyed by 2017, pick will convert to Sacramento's 2017 second-round pick, protected for 56-60)	To Sacramento Kings: J. J. Hickson
July – November
No trade due to the 2011 NBA lockout
December
December 9	To Boston Celtics: Keyon Dooling; Protected 2012 second-round pick	To Milwaukee Bucks: Draft rights to Albert Miralles
December 10	Three-team trade	
December 10	To New York Knicks: Tyson Chandler (from Dallas) (sign and trade); Draft rights to Ahmad Nivins (from Dallas); Draft rights to Georgios Printezis (from Dallas)	To Washington Wizards: Ronny Turiaf (from New York); 2013 second-round pick (from New York); Cash considerations (from New York); 2012 second-round pick (from Dallas)
December 10	To Dallas Mavericks: Andy Rautins (from New York); 2012 protected second-round pick (from Washington)	
December 11	To Dallas Mavericks: Lamar Odom; 2012 Los Angeles Lakers second-round pick	To Los Angeles Lakers: 2012 Dallas first-round pick
December 12	To Orlando Magic: Glen Davis (sign and trade); Von Wafer (sign and trade)	To Boston Celtics: Brandon Bass
December 13	To Denver Nuggets: Rudy Fernández; Corey Brewer	To Dallas Mavericks: Future Memphis conditional second-round pick (Note: Denver acquired the pick from Memphis for Steven Hunter on August 7, 2009)
December 13	To Oklahoma City Thunder: Lazar Hayward	To Minnesota Timberwolves: 2012 second-round pick; Future conditional second-round pick; Robert Vaden
December 14	To Los Angeles Clippers: Chris Paul; Two 2015 second-round picks	To New Orleans Hornets: Eric Gordon; Chris Kaman; Al-Farouq Aminu; 2012 first-round pick (Note: The better of the Clippers' and Minnesota's first-round picks)
December 19	To Indiana Pacers: Louis Amundson	To Golden State Warriors: Brandon Rush
December 19	To Charlotte Bobcats: Byron Mullens	To Oklahoma City Thunder: 2013 second-round pick
December 22	To New Jersey Nets: Mehmet Okur	To Utah Jazz: 2015 New Jersey second-round pick
December 24	To Memphis Grizzlies: Quincy Pondexter	To New Orleans Hornets: Greivis Vásquez
January
January 4	Three-team trade	
January 4	To Memphis Grizzlies: Marreese Speights (from Philadelphia)	To New Orleans Hornets: Xavier Henry (from Memphis)
January 4	To Philadelphia 76ers: 2012 second-round pick (from Memphis); future second-round pick (from New Orleans)	
February
No trade
March
March 13	To Milwaukee Bucks: Monta Ellis; Ekpe Udoh; Kwame Brown	To Golden State Warriors: Andrew Bogut; Stephen Jackson
March 15	To Golden State Warriors: 2012 second-round pick (Note: Worse of Atlanta and Phoenix picks)	To Atlanta Hawks: Cash considerations
March 15	To Houston Rockets: Marcus Camby	To Portland Trail Blazers: Jonny Flynn; Hasheem Thabeet; 2012 Minnesota second-round pick
March 15	To Indiana Pacers: Leandro Barbosa	To Toronto Raptors: Future second-round pick; Cash considerations
March 15	To Los Angeles Lakers: Ramon Sessions; Christian Eyenga	To Cleveland Cavaliers: Luke Walton; Jason Kapono; 2012 Los Angeles Lakers protected (1–14) first-round pick; Right to swap 2013 first-round pick for Miami's, currently owned by Cleveland
March 15	To Los Angeles Lakers: Jordan Hill	To Houston Rockets: Derek Fisher; 2012 Dallas protected first-round pick
March 15	To New Jersey Nets: Gerald Wallace	To Portland Trail Blazers: Mehmet Okur; Shawne Williams; 2012 first-round pick (top-3 protected)
March 15	To Philadelphia 76ers: Sam Young	To Memphis Grizzlies: Draft rights to Ricky Sánchez
March 15	To San Antonio Spurs: Stephen Jackson	To Golden State Warriors: Richard Jefferson; T. J. Ford; 2012 San Antonio protected first-round pick (Note: Pick is lottery-protected through 2014)
March 15	Three-team trade	
March 15	To Washington Wizards: Nenê (from Denver); Brian Cook (from L.A. Clippers); future second-round pick (from L.A. Clippers)	To Denver Nuggets: JaVale McGee (from Washington); Ronny Turiaf (from Washington); Future second-round pick (from L.A. Clippers)
March 15	To Los Angeles Clippers: Nick Young (from Washington)	

=== Free agency ===
Free agency started on December 9. All players are unrestricted free agents unless indicated otherwise. A restricted free agent's team has the right to keep the player by matching an offer sheet the player signs with another team.

Player	Date signed	New team	Former team	Ref
Jason Collins	December 9	Atlanta Hawks		
Ivan Johnson	December 9	Atlanta Hawks	Qingdao DoubleStar (China)	
Tracy McGrady	December 9	Atlanta Hawks	Detroit Pistons	
Vladimir Radmanović	December 9	Atlanta Hawks	Golden State Warriors	
Donald Sloan	December 9	Atlanta Hawks	Erie BayHawks (D-League)	
Jerry Stackhouse	December 9	Atlanta Hawks	Miami Heat (waived during the 2010–11 season)	
Marquis Daniels	December 9	Boston Celtics		
Chris Wilcox	December 9	Boston Celtics	Detroit Pistons	
Greg Stiemsma	December 9	Boston Celtics	Sioux Falls Skyforce (D-League)	
Derrick Brown	December 9	Charlotte Bobcats	New York Knicks	
Mychel Thompson	December 9	Cleveland Cavaliers	Erie BayHawks (D-League)	
Brandan Wright	December 9	Dallas Mavericks	New Jersey Nets	
Julyan Stone	December 9	Denver Nuggets	UTEP (went undrafted in the 2011 draft)	
Jonas Jerebko (RFA)	December 9	Detroit Pistons		
Tayshaun Prince	December 9	Detroit Pistons		
Damien Wilkins	December 9	Detroit Pistons	Atlanta Hawks	
Caron Butler	December 9	Los Angeles Clippers	Dallas Mavericks	
Jason Kapono	December 9	Los Angeles Lakers	Philadelphia 76ers	
Mario Chalmers (RFA)	December 9	Miami Heat		
Juwan Howard	December 9	Miami Heat		
James Jones	December 9	Miami Heat		
Shane Battier	December 9	Miami Heat	Memphis Grizzlies	
Dennis Horner	December 9	New Jersey Nets	Springfield Armor (D-League)	
Carldell Johnson	December 9	New Orleans Hornets	Austin Toros (D-League)	
Trey Johnson	December 9	New Orleans Hornets	Los Angeles Lakers*	
DaJuan Summers	December 9	New Orleans Hornets	Detroit Pistons*	
Lance Thomas	December 9	New Orleans Hornets	Austin Toros (D-League)	
Terrico White	December 9	New Orleans Hornets	Detroit Pistons	
Daequan Cook (RFA)	December 9	Oklahoma City Thunder		
Larry Hughes	December 9	Orlando Magic	None (did not play in the 2010–11 season)	
Grant Hill	December 9	Phoenix Suns		
Shannon Brown	December 9	Phoenix Suns	Los Angeles Lakers	
Sebastian Telfair	December 9	Phoenix Suns	Minnesota Timberwolves	
Greg Oden (RFA)	December 9	Portland Trail Blazers		
Marcus Thornton (RFA)	December 9	Sacramento Kings		
T. J. Ford	December 9	San Antonio Spurs	Indiana Pacers*	
Jamaal Magloire	December 9	Toronto Raptors	Miami Heat	
Earl Watson	December 9	Utah Jazz		
Roger Mason Jr.	December 9	Washington Wizards	New York Knicks	
Chris Wright	December 10	Golden State Warriors	Maine Red Claws (D-League)	
Jeff Foster	December 10	Indiana Pacers		
Jeff Pendergraph	December 10	Indiana Pacers	Portland Trail Blazers (waived during the 2010–11 season)	
Josh Davis	December 10	Memphis Grizzlies	Bancatercas Teramo (Italy)	
Jeremy Pargo	December 10	Memphis Grizzlies	Maccabi Tel Aviv (Israel)	
Brian Skinner	December 10	Memphis Grizzlies	Benetton Treviso (Italy)	
Eddy Curry	December 10	Miami Heat	Minnesota Timberwolves (waived during the 2010–11 season)	
Mickell Gladness	December 10	Miami Heat	Dakota Wizards (D-League)	
Terrel Harris	December 10	Miami Heat	Rio Grande Valley Vipers (D-League)	
Mike Dunleavy Jr.	December 10	Milwaukee Bucks	Indiana Pacers	
Darington Hobson	December 10	Milwaukee Bucks (waived during the 2010–11 season)		
Tyson Chandler	December 10	New York Knicks (via sign and trade)	Dallas Mavericks	
Thaddeus Young (RFA)	December 10	Philadelphia 76ers		
Rasual Butler	December 10	Toronto Raptors	Chicago Bulls*	
Jamaal Tinsley	December 10	Utah Jazz	Los Angeles D-Fenders (D-League)	
Larry Owens	December 10	Washington Wizards		
Jared Jeffries	December 11	New York Knicks		
Mike Bibby	December 11	New York Knicks	Miami Heat	
Spencer Hawes (RFA)	December 11	Philadelphia 76ers		
Kurt Thomas	December 11	Portland Trail Blazers	Chicago Bulls	
Aaron Gray	December 11	Toronto Raptors	New Orleans Hornets	
Hamady N'Diaye	December 11	Washington Wizards		
Aleksandar Pavlović	December 12	Boston Celtics		
Brian Scalabrine	December 12	Chicago Bulls*		
Anthony Parker	December 12	Cleveland Cavaliers		
Brian Cardinal	December 12	Dallas Mavericks		
Vince Carter	December 12	Dallas Mavericks	Phoenix Suns (waived on December 9)	
Jeremy Lin	December 12	Houston Rockets (claimed off waivers)	Golden State Warriors (waived on December 9)	
DeAndre Jordan (RFA)	December 12	Los Angeles Clippers		
Chauncey Billups	December 12	Los Angeles Clippers (claimed off waivers)	New York Knicks (waived on December 10)	
Jason Richardson	December 12	Orlando Magic		
Glen Davis	December 12	Orlando Magic (via sign and trade)	Boston Celtics	
Von Wafer	December 12	Orlando Magic (via sign and trade)	Boston Celtics	
Tony Battie	December 12	Philadelphia 76ers		
Gani Lawal	December 12	San Antonio Spurs	Phoenix Suns (waived on December 9)	
Anthony Carter	December 12	Toronto Raptors	New York Knicks	
Delonte West	December 13	Dallas Mavericks	Boston Celtics	
DeMarre Carroll	December 13	Denver Nuggets	Houston Rockets (waived during the 2010–11 season)	
David West	December 13	Indiana Pacers	New Orleans Hornets	
Luc Mbah a Moute (RFA)	December 13	Milwaukee Bucks		
Shelden Williams	December 13	New Jersey Nets	New York Knicks	
Marco Belinelli (RFA)	December 13	New Orleans Hornets		
Ronnie Price	December 13	Phoenix Suns	Utah Jazz	
Melvin Ely	December 14	Charlotte Bobcats	Denver Nuggets	
Richard Hamilton	December 14	Chicago Bulls	Detroit Pistons (waived on December 12)	
Nenê	December 14	Denver Nuggets		
Kwame Brown	December 14	Golden State Warriors	Charlotte Bobcats	
Josh McRoberts	December 14	Los Angeles Lakers	Indiana Pacers	
Marc Gasol (RFA)	December 14	Memphis Grizzlies		
José Juan Barea	December 14	Minnesota Timberwolves	Dallas Mavericks	
Gary Forbes (RFA)	December 14	Toronto Raptors	Denver Nuggets	
Reggie Williams	December 15	Charlotte Bobcats	Golden State Warriors*	
Dominic McGuire	December 15	Golden State Warriors	Charlotte Bobcats (waived during the 2010–11 season)	
Shawne Williams	December 15	New Jersey Nets	New York Knicks	
Earl Clark	December 15	Orlando Magic*		
Jamal Crawford	December 15	Portland Trail Blazers	Atlanta Hawks	
Craig Smith	December 15	Portland Trail Blazers	Los Angeles Clippers	
Steve Novak	December 15	San Antonio Spurs		
Josh Howard	December 15	Utah Jazz	Washington Wizards	
Ish Smith	December 16	Golden State Warriors (claimed off waivers)	Memphis Grizzlies (waived on December 14)	
Maurice Evans	December 16	Washington Wizards		
Rodney Stuckey (RFA)	December 17	Detroit Pistons		
Carl Landry	December 17	New Orleans Hornets		
Jason Smith	December 17	New Orleans Hornets		
Travis Outlaw	December 17	Sacramento Kings (claimed off waivers)	New Jersey Nets (waived on December 15)	
Troy Murphy	December 18	Los Angeles Lakers	Boston Celtics	
Ben Uzoh	December 19	Charlotte Bobcats	New Jersey Nets	
Baron Davis	December 19	New York Knicks	Cleveland Cavaliers (waived on December 14)	
Nick Young (RFA)	December 19	Washington Wizards*		
Jannero Pargo	December 20	Atlanta Hawks	Chicago Bulls (waived on December 16)	
Arron Afflalo (RFA)	December 20	Denver Nuggets		
Sean Williams	December 21	Dallas Mavericks	Maccabi Haifa (Israel)	
Jeff Adrien	December 21	Houston Rockets	Golden State Warriors* (waived on June 30)	
Kris Humphries	December 21	New Jersey Nets		
Steve Novak	December 21	New York Knicks (claimed off waivers)	San Antonio Spurs (waived on December 19)	
Willie Green	December 22	Atlanta Hawks	New Orleans Hornets	
Reggie Evans	December 22	Los Angeles Clippers	Toronto Raptors	
DeShawn Stevenson	December 23	New Jersey Nets	Dallas Mavericks	
Gustavo Ayón	December 23	New Orleans Hornets	Fuenlabrada (Spain)	
Chuck Hayes	December 23	Sacramento Kings (previously signed on December 9 before the contract was voided on December 19)	Houston Rockets	
Mickaël Piétrus	December 24	Boston Celtics	Phoenix Suns (waived on December 22)	
Dante Cunningham (RFA)	December 24	Memphis Grizzlies	Charlotte Bobcats	
Cory Higgins	December 25	Charlotte Bobcats (claimed off waivers)	Denver Nuggets (waived on December 23)	
Samuel Dalembert	December 26	Houston Rockets	Sacramento Kings	
Jeremy Lin	December 27	New York Knicks (claimed off waivers)	Houston Rockets (waived on December 25)	
Michael Redd	December 29	Phoenix Suns	Milwaukee Bucks	
Hamed Haddadi	December 31	Memphis Grizzlies*		
Ike Diogu	January 3	San Antonio Spurs	Los Angeles Clippers	
Solomon Jones	January 3	Los Angeles Clippers	Indiana Pacers	
Nate Robinson	January 4	Golden State Warriors	Oklahoma City Thunder (waived on December 24)	
Yi Jianlian	January 6	Dallas Mavericks	Washington Wizards*	
Mike James	January 11	Chicago Bulls	Erie BayHawks (D-League)	
Malcolm Thomas	January 11	San Antonio Spurs	Los Angeles D-Fenders (D-League)	
Earl Barron	January 14	Golden State Warriors	Portland Trail Blazers (waived on December 20)	
Courtney Fortson	January 16	Los Angeles Clippers	Los Angeles D-Fenders (D-League)	
Larry Owens	January 18	New Jersey Nets	Tulsa 66ers (D-League)	
Walker Russell Jr.	January 20	Detroit Pistons	Fort Wayne Mad Ants (D-League)	
Francisco Elson	January 27	Philadelphia 76ers	Utah Jazz	
Keith Bogans	January 31	New Jersey Nets	Chicago Bulls (waived on December 16)	
Ish Smith	February 2	Orlando Magic	Los Angeles D-Fenders (D-League)	
Kenyon Martin	February 3	Los Angeles Clippers	Denver Nuggets*	
Greg Smith	February 8	Houston Rockets	Rio Grande Valley Vipers (D-League)	
DeMarre Carroll	February 8	Utah Jazz	Denver Nuggets (waived on February 4)	
J. R. Smith	February 17	New York Knicks	Denver Nuggets*	
Joel Przybilla	February 27	Portland Trail Blazers	Charlotte Bobcats	
Lance Thomas	February 27	New Orleans Hornets (previously signed two 10-day contracts)		
Erick Dampier	March 1	Atlanta Hawks (previously signed two 10-day contracts)		
Donald Sloan	March 16	Cleveland Cavaliers	New Orleans Hornets (waived on March 1)	
Manny Harris	March 17	Cleveland Cavaliers (previously signed two 10-day contracts)		
Wilson Chandler (RFA)	March 18	Denver Nuggets*		
Gerald Green	March 18	New Jersey Nets (previously signed two 10-day contracts)		
Gilbert Arenas	March 20	Memphis Grizzlies	Orlando Magic (waived on December 9)	
Chris Johnson	March 20	New Orleans Hornets (claimed off waivers)	Portland Trail Blazers (waived on March 15)	
Ronny Turiaf	March 21	Miami Heat	Denver Nuggets (waived on March 18)	
Derek Fisher	March 21	Oklahoma City Thunder	Houston Rockets (waived on March 19)	
J. J. Hickson	March 21	Portland Trail Blazers (claimed off waivers)	Sacramento Kings (waived on March 19)	
Ryan Hollins	March 23	Boston Celtics	Cleveland Cavaliers (waived on March 20)	
Kelenna Azubuike	March 23	Dallas Mavericks	None (did not play in the 2010–11 season)	
Kyrylo Fesenko	March 23	Indiana Pacers	Utah Jazz	
Boris Diaw	March 23	San Antonio Spurs	Charlotte Bobcats (waived on March 21)	
Bobby Simmons	March 24	Los Angeles Clippers (previously signed two 10-day contracts)		
Patrick Mills	March 27	San Antonio Spurs	Portland Trail Blazers*	
Courtney Fortson	March 27	Houston Rockets (previously signed a 10-day contract)		
Terrence Williams	March 31	Sacramento Kings (previously signed a 10-day contract)		
Mickell Gladness	April 1	Golden State Warriors (previously signed a 10-day contract)		
Mike James	April 5	Chicago Bulls (previously signed two 10-day contracts)		
Diamon Simpson	April 12	Houston Rockets	Adelaide 36ers (Australia)	
Jamario Moon	April 15	Charlotte Bobcats	Los Angeles D-Fenders (D-League)	
Morris Almond	April 16	Washington Wizards	Maine Red Claws (D-League)	
Mikki Moore	April 16	Golden State Warriors	Idaho Stampede (D-League)	
Sean Williams	April 20	Boston Celtics	Dallas Mavericks (waived on March 22)	
Lester Hudson	April 20	Memphis Grizzlies	Cleveland Cavaliers (previously signed two 10-day contracts)	
Dan Gadzuric	April 20	New York Knicks	Texas Legends (D-League)	
Xavier Silas	April 24	Philadelphia 76ers	Maine Red Claws (D-League)	

Note

- * Played overseas during the lockout.

==== 10-day contracts ====
A player can sign a 10-day contract beginning on February 6. A player can only sign two 10-day contracts with the same team in one season. If the team want to retain the player after the second 10-day contract expired, the team has to sign the player for the remainder of the season.

Player	Date signed (1st contract)	Date signed (2nd contract)	New team	Former team	Ref
Lance Thomas	February 6	February 16	New Orleans Hornets	Austin Toros (D-League)	
Donald Sloan	February 8	February 20	New Orleans Hornets	Atlanta Hawks (waived on January 26)	
Erick Dampier	February 9	February 19	Atlanta Hawks	Miami Heat	
Ben Uzoh	February 10	—	Cleveland Cavaliers	Rio Grande Valley Vipers (D-League)	
Francisco Elson	February 11	February 21	Philadelphia 76ers (previously waived on February 7)		
Mickell Gladness	February 12	February 28	Miami Heat (previously waived on February 7)		
Mike James	February 14	March 14	Chicago Bulls	Erie BayHawks (D-League)	
Andre Emmett	February 14	—	New Jersey Nets	Sioux Falls Skyforce (D-League)	
Solomon Jones	February 15	February 27	New Orleans Hornets	Los Angeles Clippers (waived on February 7)	
Eric Dawson	February 20	March 16	San Antonio Spurs	Austin Toros (D-League)	
Manny Harris	February 21	March 2	Cleveland Cavaliers	Canton Charge (D-League)	
Bobby Simmons	February 27	March 9	Los Angeles Clippers	Reno Bighorns (D-League)	
Gerald Green	February 27	March 8	New Jersey Nets	Los Angeles D-Fenders (D-League)	
Jeff Foote	March 9	—	New Orleans Hornets	Springfield Armor (D-League)	
Jerry Smith	March 16	—	New Jersey Nets	Springfield Armor (D-League)	
Courtney Fortson	March 17	—	Houston Rockets	Los Angeles D-Fenders (D-League)	
Edwin Ubiles	March 18	—	Washington Wizards	Dakota Wizards (D-League)	
Terrence Williams	March 21	—	Sacramento Kings	Houston Rockets (waived on March 16)	
Mickell Gladness	March 22	—	Golden State Warriors	Miami Heat (waived on March 9)	
Justin Dentmon	March 24	—	San Antonio Spurs	Austin Toros (D-League)	
Keith Benson	March 24	—	Golden State Warriors	Sioux Falls Skyforce (D-League)	
Earl Boykins	March 26	April 5	Houston Rockets	Milwaukee Bucks	
Alan Anderson	March 26	April 6	Toronto Raptors	Canton Charge (D-League)	
Ben Uzoh	March 27	April 6	Toronto Raptors	Rio Grande Valley Vipers (D-League)	
Malcolm Thomas	March 27	—	Houston Rockets	Los Angeles D-Fenders (D-League)	
Cartier Martin	March 28		Washington Wizards	Iowa Energy (D-League)	
Lester Hudson	March 30	April 9	Cleveland Cavaliers	Austin Toros (D-League)	
Dennis Horner	March 30	—	New Jersey Nets	Springfield Armor (D-League)	
James Singleton	April 5	—	Washington Wizards	Guangdong Southern Tigers (China)	
Justin Dentmon	April 6	—	Toronto Raptors	Austin Toros (D-League)	
Armon Johnson	April 9	—	New Jersey Nets	Portland Trail Blazers (waived on February 27)	

=== Released ===
==== Waived ====
Player	Date waived	Former team	Ref
Jermaine Taylor	June 14	Sacramento Kings	
Jeff Adrien	June 30	Golden State Warriors	
Joey Graham	December 9	Cleveland Cavaliers	
Terrico White	December 9	Detroit Pistons	
Jeremy Lin	December 9	Golden State Warriors	
Gilbert Arenas*	December 9	Orlando Magic	
Vince Carter	December 9	Phoenix Suns	
Gani Lawal	December 9	Phoenix Suns	
Chauncey Billups*	December 10	New York Knicks	
Charlie Bell*	December 11	Golden State Warriors	
Richard Hamilton	December 12	Detroit Pistons	
James Posey*	December 12	Indiana Pacers	
Robert Vaden	December 13	Minnesota Timberwolves	
Patrick Ewing Jr.	December 13	New Orleans Hornets	
Zabian Dowdell	December 13	Phoenix Suns	
Da'Sean Butler	December 13	San Antonio Spurs	
Baron Davis*	December 14	Cleveland Cavaliers	
Ish Smith	December 14	Memphis Grizzlies	
Andy Rautins	December 15	Dallas Mavericks	
Travis Outlaw*	December 15	New Jersey Nets	
Brandon Roy*	December 15	Portland Trail Blazers	
Keith Bogans	December 16	Chicago Bulls	
Jannero Pargo	December 16	Chicago Bulls	
Terrico White	December 17	New Orleans Hornets	
Marqus Blakely	December 19	Houston Rockets	
Willie Warren	December 19	Los Angeles Clippers	
David Andersen	December 19	New Orleans Hornets	
Antonio McDyess	December 19	San Antonio Spurs	
Steve Novak	December 19	San Antonio Spurs	
Earl Barron	December 20	Portland Trail Blazers	
Larry Owens	December 21	Washington Wizards	
Manny Harris	December 22	Cleveland Cavaliers	
Stephen Graham	December 22	New Jersey Nets	
Mickaël Piétrus	December 22	Phoenix Suns	
Gani Lawal	December 22	San Antonio Spurs	
Keith Benson	December 23	Atlanta Hawks	
Magnum Rolle	December 23	Atlanta Hawks	
Pape Sy	December 23	Atlanta Hawks	
Melvin Ely	December 23	Charlotte Bobcats	
Ben Uzoh	December 24	Charlotte Bobcats	
Marcus Cousin	December 24	Houston Rockets	
Jeremy Lin	December 24	Houston Rockets	
Eddie House	December 24	Miami Heat	
Nate Robinson	December 24	Oklahoma City Thunder	
Brian Skinner	December 29	Memphis Grizzlies	
Lance Thomas	December 31	New Orleans Hornets	
Garret Siler	January 2	Phoenix Suns	
Ike Diogu	January 11	San Antonio Spurs	
Ish Smith	January 13	Golden State Warriors	
Dennis Horner	January 18	New Jersey Nets	
Donald Sloan	January 26	Atlanta Hawks	
Courtney Fortson	January 27	Los Angeles Clippers	
Trey Johnson	January 27	New Orleans Hornets	
Mike James	January 28	Chicago Bulls	
Larry Owens	January 31	New Jersey Nets	
Larry Hughes	February 1	Orlando Magic	
Darington Hobson	February 3	Milwaukee Bucks	
DeMarre Carroll	February 4	Denver Nuggets	
Mychel Thompson	February 6	Cleveland Cavaliers	
Earl Barron	February 6	Golden State Warriors	
Jeff Adrien	February 7	Houston Rockets	
Solomon Jones	February 7	Los Angeles Clippers	
Derrick Caracter	February 7	Los Angeles Lakers	
Josh Davis	February 7	Memphis Grizzlies	
Mickell Gladness	February 7	Miami Heat	
Carldell Johnson	February 7	New Orleans Hornets	
DaJuan Summers	February 7	New Orleans Hornets	
Francisco Elson	February 7	Philadelphia 76ers	
Malcolm Thomas	February 7	San Antonio Spurs	
Hamady N'Diaye	February 7	Washington Wizards	
Keith Bogans	February 14	New Jersey Nets	
Renaldo Balkman	February 17	New York Knicks	
Armon Johnson	February 27	Portland Trail Blazers	
Greg Oden	March 15	Portland Trail Blazers	
Chris Johnson	March 15	Portland Trail Blazers	
Anthony Carter	March 15	Toronto Raptors	
Terrence Williams	March 16	Houston Rockets	
Jason Kapono	March 17	Cleveland Cavaliers	
T. J. Ford	March 17	Golden State Warriors	
Ronny Turiaf	March 18	Denver Nuggets	
Derek Fisher	March 19	Houston Rockets	
J. J. Hickson	March 19	Sacramento Kings	
Ryan Hollins	March 20	Cleveland Cavaliers	
Andrés Nocioni	March 20	Philadelphia 76ers	
Boris Diaw	March 21	Charlotte Bobcats	
Ryan Reid	March 21	Oklahoma City Thunder	
Mehmet Okur	March 21	Portland Trail Blazers	
Sean Williams	March 22	Dallas Mavericks	
Chris Wilcox	March 23	Boston Celtics	
Rasual Butler	March 23	Toronto Raptors	
Roger Mason Jr.	April 16	Washington Wizards	
Jermaine O'Neal	April 20	Boston Celtics	

Note

- * Released under the amnesty clause in the new CBA, which gives teams a one-time option to waive a player's remaining contract from the salary cap.

==== Training camp cuts ====
The following players were signed and invited to the training camp but were waived before the start of the season.

Atlanta Hawks	Boston Celtics	Charlotte Bobcats	Chicago Bulls	Cleveland Cavaliers
Charles Garcia; Zach Graham; Brad Wanamaker	Gilbert Brown; Jamal Sampson; Michael Sweetney	Will Blalock; Ronald Dupree; Taylor Griffin; Isma'il Muhammad; Durrell Summers		Tyrell Biggs; Kyle Goldcamp; Kenny Hayes; J. P. Prince
Dallas Mavericks	Denver Nuggets	Detroit Pistons	Golden State Warriors	Houston Rockets
Drew Neitzel; Jerome Randle	Cory Higgins; Michael Ruffin	Brian Hamilton; Kareem Rush; Walker Russell Jr.; Jake Voskuhl	Gary Flowers; Julian Khazzouh; Tommy Mitchell; Tim Pickett; Tommy Smith; Edwin Ubiles	Ibrahim Jaaber; Casey Mitchell; Omar Samhan; Damian Saunders; Greg Smith
Indiana Pacers	Los Angeles Clippers	Los Angeles Lakers	Memphis Grizzlies	Miami Heat
Jarrid Famous; Tyren Johnson; Darnell Lazare; Matt Rogers	Blake Ahearn; Courtney Fortson; Marcus Hubbard; Adam Koch; Renaldo Major	Zach Andrews; Chris Daniels; Gerald Green; Elijah Millsap; Malcolm Thomas	Mikki Moore; Jared Reiner; Walter Sharpe	Derrick Byars; Cameron Jones; Jeremy Wise; Billy White
Milwaukee Bucks	Minnesota Timberwolves	New Jersey Nets	New Orleans Hornets	New York Knicks
Ron Howard; Marcus Lewis	Will Conroy; Devean George; Dominique Johnson; Shaun Pruitt; Bonzi Wells	JamesOn Curry; Jerry Smith; Ime Udoka	Brian Butch; Justin Dentmon; Jerome Dyson; Moses Ehambe	Devin Green; Chris Hunter
Oklahoma City Thunder	Orlando Magic	Philadelphia 76ers	Phoenix Suns	Portland Trail Blazers
Marcus Dove; Anthony Goods; Terrence Roberts	Gabe Pruitt	Antonio Anderson; Dwayne Jones; Xavier Silas; Mike Tisdale	Dwight Buycks; Jeremy Hazell; Marcus Landry	Marshall Brown; Jeff Foote; Ben McCauley; Seth Tarver
Sacramento Kings	San Antonio Spurs	Toronto Raptors	Utah Jazz	Washington Wizards
Lawrence Hill; Adrian Oliver	Devin Gibson; Frank Hassell; Antoine Hood; Doug Thomas; Luke Zeller		Paul Carter; Trey Gilder; Keith McLeod; Scottie Reynolds	Mardy Collins; Aaron Pettway; Mike Wilks

=== D-League assignments ===
Each NBA team can assign players with two years or less of experience to its affiliated NBA Development League team. Players with more than two years of experience may be assigned to the D-League with the players' consent.

Player	Date assigned	Date recalled	NBA team	D-League team
Andrew Goudelock	December 17	December 18	Los Angeles Lakers	Los Angeles D-Fenders
Malcolm Thomas	December 17	December 18	Los Angeles Lakers	Los Angeles D-Fenders
Drew Neitzel	December 21	December 22	Dallas Mavericks	Texas Legends
Jerome Randle	December 21	December 22	Dallas Mavericks	Texas Legends
Sean Williams	December 21	December 22	Dallas Mavericks	Texas Legends
Darington Hobson	December 29	January 4	Milwaukee Bucks	Fort Wayne Mad Ants
Tyler Honeycutt	January 1	January 22	Sacramento Kings	Reno Bighorns
Hassan Whiteside	January 1	February 3	Sacramento Kings	Reno Bighorns
Hamady N'Diaye	January 1	January 30	Washington Wizards	Iowa Energy
Gary Neal	January 2	January 3	San Antonio Spurs	Austin Toros
Jordan Hamilton	January 3	January 15	Denver Nuggets	Idaho Stampede
Julyan Stone	January 3	January 10	Denver Nuggets	Idaho Stampede
Marcus Morris	January 3	January 16	Houston Rockets	Rio Grande Valley Vipers
Cory Joseph	January 3	January 11	San Antonio Spurs	Austin Toros
Christian Eyenga	January 4	January 23	Cleveland Cavaliers	Canton Charge
Luke Babbitt	January 4	January 10	Portland Trail Blazers	Idaho Stampede
Armon Johnson	January 4	January 15	Portland Trail Blazers	Idaho Stampede
Solomon Alabi	January 4	January 22	Toronto Raptors	Bakersfield Jam
Sean Williams (2)	January 6	March 4	Dallas Mavericks	Texas Legends
Yi Jianlian	January 6	January 9	Dallas Mavericks	Texas Legends
Dominique Jones	January 15	January 23	Dallas Mavericks	Texas Legends
Ryan Reid	January 16	February 6	Oklahoma City Thunder	Tulsa 66ers
Jerome Jordan	January 17	January 23	New York Knicks	Erie BayHawks
Jeremy Lin	January 17	January 23	New York Knicks	Erie BayHawks
Darington Hobson (2)	January 18	February 1	Milwaukee Bucks	Fort Wayne Mad Ants
Jordan Williams	January 18	January 29	New Jersey Nets	Springfield Armor
Derrick Caracter	January 25	February 7	Los Angeles Lakers	Los Angeles D-Fenders
Luke Harangody	January 26	February 1	Cleveland Cavaliers	Canton Charge
Chris Wright	January 26	February 6	Golden State Warriors	Dakota Wizards
Eric Bledsoe	January 26	January 28	Los Angeles Clippers	Bakersfield Jam
Malcolm Thomas (2)	January 30	February 7	San Antonio Spurs	Austin Toros
Marcus Morris (2)	February 3	February 20	Houston Rockets	Rio Grande Valley Vipers
Malcolm Lee	February 6	February 12	Minnesota Timberwolves	Sioux Falls Skyforce
Craig Brackins	February 7	March 2	Philadelphia 76ers	Maine Red Claws
Greg Smith	February 9	February 19	Houston Rockets	Rio Grande Valley Vipers
Josh Selby	February 13	February 27	Memphis Grizzlies	Reno Bighorns
Devin Ebanks	February 15	February 28	Los Angeles Lakers	Los Angeles D-Fenders
Jeremy Tyler	February 27	March 6	Golden State Warriors	Dakota Wizards
Malcolm Lee (2)	February 29	March 9	Minnesota Timberwolves	Sioux Falls Skyforce
Lamar Odom	March 2	March 3	Dallas Mavericks	Texas Legends
Travis Leslie	March 2	March 12	Los Angeles Clippers	Bakersfield Jam
Jerome Jordan (2)	March 2	March 8	New York Knicks	Erie Bayhawks
Lazar Hayward	March 2	March 4	Oklahoma City Thunder	Tulsa 66ers
Cory Joseph (2)	March 3	March 9	San Antonio Spurs	Austin Toros
T. J. Ford	March 5	March 6	San Antonio Spurs	Austin Toros
Christian Eyenga (2)	March 6	March 15	Cleveland Cavaliers	Canton Charge
Luke Harangody (2)	March 6	April 14	Cleveland Cavaliers	Canton Charge
Darius Morris	March 7	March 16	Los Angeles Lakers	Los Angeles D-Fenders
Vernon Macklin	March 11	April 8	Detroit Pistons	Fort Wayne Mad Ants
Sean Williams (3)	March 13	March 16	Dallas Mavericks	Texas Legends
Ryan Reid (2)	March 16	March 21	Oklahoma City Thunder	Tulsa 66ers
Christian Eyenga (3)	March 16		Los Angeles Lakers	Los Angeles D-Fenders
Lazar Hayward (2)	March 17	March 18	Oklahoma City Thunder	Tulsa 66ers
Xavier Henry	March 18	March 19	New Orleans Hornets	Iowa Energy
Cory Joseph (3)	March 20		San Antonio Spurs	Austin Toros
Greg Smith (2)	March 21	April 8	Houston Rockets	Rio Grande Valley Vipers
Kelenna Azubuike	March 23	April 9	Dallas Mavericks	Texas Legends
Chris Wright (2)	March 24	April 4	Golden State Warriors	Dakota Wizards
Reggie Jackson	March 24	March 25	Oklahoma City Thunder	Tulsa 66ers
Josh Selby (2)	March 26	March 31	Memphis Grizzlies	Reno Bighorns
Travis Leslie (2)	March 29		Los Angeles Clippers	Bakersfield Jam
Malcolm Thomas (3)	March 30	April 6	Houston Rockets	Rio Grande Valley Vipers
Courtney Fortson	April 5	April 8	Houston Rockets	Rio Grande Valley Vipers
Josh Selby (3)	April 5	April 8	Memphis Grizzlies	Reno Bighorns
Chris Wright (3)	April 10	April 16	Golden State Warriors	Dakota Wizards
Luke Harangody (3)	April 15		Cleveland Cavaliers	Canton Charge

Note

- Numbers in parentheses indicates the number of assignments a player has received during the season.

=== Going overseas ===
The following players were on NBA rosters at the end of the previous season. Many players signed with teams from other leagues due to the 2011 NBA lockout. FIBA allowed players under NBA contracts to sign and play for teams from other leagues if the contracts had opt-out clauses that allowed the players to return to the NBA if the lockout ended. The Chinese Basketball Association, however, only allowed its clubs to sign foreign free agents who could play for at least the entire season. Chinese nationals were exempt from this rule; this allowed Yi Jianlian to return to the NBA upon the end of the lockout. The list also includes unsigned 2011 draft picks who signed with teams from other leagues, but excludes unsigned 2011 draft picks who were already playing overseas before the draft.

*	Denotes international players who returned to their home country

==== Before and during the lockout ====
Player	Date signed	New team	New country	NBA team	NBA contract status	Opt-out clause	Ref
Nenad Krstić	June 22	CSKA Moscow	Russia	Boston Celtics	Unrestricted free agent	No	
Mustafa Shakur	June 27	Pau-Orthez	France	Washington Wizards	Unrestricted free agent	No	
David Andersen	June 28	Montepaschi Siena	Italy	New Orleans Hornets	Under contract until 2012	No	
Hilton Armstrong	June 30	ASVEL Basket	France	Atlanta Hawks	Unrestricted free agent	No	
DaJuan Summers	July 3	Montepaschi Siena	Italy	Detroit Pistons	Unrestricted free agent	No	
Sonny Weems	July 8	Žalgiris Kaunas	Lithuania	Toronto Raptors	Restricted free agent	No	
Darius Songaila	July 8	Galatasaray Medical Park	Turkey	Philadelphia 76ers	Unrestricted free agent	No	
Lavoy Allen	July 14	Strasbourg IG	France	Philadelphia 76ers (played for Temple before the draft)	Unsigned draft pick	Yes	
Sasha Vujačić	July 15	Anadolu Efes	Turkey	New Jersey Nets	Unrestricted free agent	No	
Deron Williams	July 16	Beşiktaş Milangaz	Turkey	New Jersey Nets	Under contract until 2013	Yes	
Timofey Mozgov*	July 21	BC Khimki	Russia	Denver Nuggets	Under contract until 2013	Yes	
Chris Quinn	July 21	BC Khimki	Russia	San Antonio Spurs	Unrestricted free agent	No	
Magnum Rolle	July 27	Changwon LG Sakers	South Korea	Atlanta Hawks	Under contract until 2012	Yes	
Garrett Temple	July 27	Fastweb Casale	Italy	Charlotte Bobcats	Unrestricted free agent	No	
E'Twaun Moore	July 28	Benetton Treviso	Italy	Boston Celtics (played for Purdue before the draft)	Unsigned draft pick	Yes	
Acie Law	July 29	Partizan	Serbia	Golden State Warriors	Unrestricted free agent	No	
Jeff Adrien	July 30	Benetton Treviso	Italy	Golden State Warriors	Unrestricted free agent (waived on June 30)	Yes	
Nicolas Batum*	August 1	SLUC Nancy	France	Portland Trail Blazers	Under contract until 2012	Yes	
Mario West	August 2	Tezenis Verona	Italy	New Jersey Nets	Unrestricted free agent	No	
Jordan Farmar	August 3	Maccabi Tel Aviv	Israel	New Jersey Nets	Under contract until 2013	Yes	
Ersan İlyasova*	August 3	Anadolu Efes	Turkey	Milwaukee Bucks	Under contract until 2012	Yes	
Trey Johnson	August 3	Bancatercas Teramo	Italy	Los Angeles Lakers	Unrestricted free agent	No	
Von Wafer	August 4	Vanoli Cremona	Italy	Boston Celtics	Unrestricted free agent	Yes	
Trevor Booker	August 4	Bnei HaSharon	Israel	Washington Wizards	Under contract until 2013	Yes	
Jon Leuer	August 5	Deutsche Bank Skyliners	Germany	Milwaukee Bucks (played for Wisconsin before the draft)	Unsigned draft pick	Yes	
Jon Diebler	August 6	Panionios	Greece	Portland Trail Blazers (played for Ohio State before the draft)	Unsigned draft pick	No	
Earl Clark	August 10	Zhejiang Lions	China	Orlando Magic	Unrestricted free agent	No	
Danny Green	August 13	KK Union Olimpija	Slovenia	San Antonio Spurs	Under contract until 2012	Yes	
Ty Lawson	August 15	Žalgiris Kaunas	Lithuania	Denver Nuggets	Under contract until 2013	Yes	
Nikola Peković	August 16	Partizan	Serbia	Minnesota Timberwolves	Under contract until 2013	Yes	
Leandro Barbosa*	August 18	Flamengo	Brazil	Toronto Raptors	Under contract until 2012	Yes	
Keith Benson	August 19	Dinamo Sassari	Italy	Atlanta Hawks (played for Oakland before the draft)	Unsigned draft pick	Yes	
Justin Harper	August 19	Strasbourg IG	France	Orlando Magic (played for Richmond before the draft)	Unsigned draft pick	Yes	
Eugene Jeter	August 19	FIATC Joventut	Spain	Sacramento Kings	Unrestricted free agent	No	
Nikola Vučević*	August 22	KK Budućnost	Montenegro	Philadelphia 76ers (played for USC before the draft)	Unsigned draft pick	Yes	
Rasual Butler	August 22	Gran Canaria	Spain	Chicago Bulls	Unrestricted free agent	No	
Alonzo Gee	August 23	Asseco Prokom	Poland	Cleveland Cavaliers	Under contract until 2012	No	
Reggie Williams	August 23	Caja Laboral	Spain	Golden State Warriors	Restricted free agent	Yes	
Kyle Singler	August 23	Lucentum Alicante	Spain	Detroit Pistons (played for Duke before the draft)	Unsigned draft pick	Yes	
Craig Brackins	August 25	Maccabi Ashdod	Israel	Philadelphia 76ers	Under contract until 2013	Yes	
Pape Sy*	August 26	BCM Gravelines	France	Atlanta Hawks	Under contract until 2013	Yes	
Wilson Chandler	August 29	Zhejiang Lions	China	Denver Nuggets	Restricted free agent	No	
Patrick Mills*	August 29	Melbourne Tigers	Australia	Portland Trail Blazers	Restricted free agent	Yes	
DeJuan Blair	September 2	Krasnye Krylya Samara	Russia	San Antonio Spurs	Under contract until 2013	Yes	
Chandler Parsons	September 2	Cholet Basket	France	Houston Rockets (played for Florida before the draft)	Unsigned draft pick	Yes	
Josh Powell	September 5	Liaoning Dinosaurs	China	Atlanta Hawks	Unrestricted free agent	No	
Gani Lawal	September 6	Zastal Zielona Góra	Poland	Phoenix Suns	Under contract until 2013	Yes	
Chris Douglas-Roberts	September 10	Virtus Bologna	Italy	Milwaukee Bucks	Unrestricted free agent	No	
J. R. Smith	September 13	Zhejiang Golden Bulls	China	Denver Nuggets	Unrestricted free agent	No	
Jermaine Taylor	September 14	Liaoning Dinosaurs	China	Sacramento Kings	Unrestricted free agent (waived on June 14)	No	
Semih Erden*	September 20	Beşiktaş Milangaz	Turkey	Cleveland Cavaliers	Under contract until 2012	Yes	
Rudy Fernández*	September 20	Real Madrid	Spain	Dallas Mavericks	Under contract until 2012	Yes	
Danilo Gallinari*	September 20	Armani Milano	Italy	Denver Nuggets	Under contract until 2012	Yes	
Mehmet Okur*	September 20	Türk Telekom	Turkey	Utah Jazz	Under contract until 2012	Yes	
Kevin Seraphin	September 20	Caja Laboral	Spain	Washington Wizards	Under contract until 2013	Yes	
Robert Vaden	September 20	BK SPU Nitra	Slovakia	Oklahoma City Thunder	Under contract until 2012	Yes	
Kenyon Martin	September 21	Xinjiang Flying Tigers	China	Denver Nuggets	Unrestricted free agent	No (Note: Negotiated a buyout on December 21, 2011. Cleared by FIBA to sign with a new team on February 2, 2012.)	
Byron Mullens	September 21	Panionios	Greece	Oklahoma City Thunder	Under contract until 2013	Yes	
Donatas Motiejūnas	September 22	Asseco Prokom	Poland	Houston Rockets (played for Benetton Treviso before the draft)	Unsigned draft pick	Yes	
Brian Scalabrine	September 22	Benetton Treviso	Italy	Chicago Bulls	Unrestricted free agent	No	
Austin Daye	September 23	BC Khimki	Russia	Detroit Pistons	Under contract until 2012	Yes	
Ater Majok	September 23	BK SPU Nitra	Slovakia	Los Angeles Lakers (played for Gold Coast Blaze before the draft)	Unsigned draft pick	No	
Joey Dorsey	September 26	Caja Laboral	Spain	Toronto Raptors	Unrestricted free agent	No	
Boris Diaw*	September 27	JSA Bordeaux	France	Charlotte Bobcats	Under contract until 2012	Yes	
Ben Uzoh	October 1	Lokomotiv-Kuban	Russia	New Jersey Nets	Unrestricted free agent	No	
Dan Gadzuric	October 4	Jiangsu Dragons	China	New Jersey Nets	Unrestricted free agent	No	
Andrei Kirilenko*	October 4	CSKA Moscow	Russia	Utah Jazz	Unrestricted free agent	Yes	
Tony Parker*	October 5	ASVEL Basket	France	San Antonio Spurs	Under contract until 2015	Yes	
Avery Bradley	October 5	Hapoel Jerusalem	Israel	Boston Celtics	Under contract until 2013	No	
Zaza Pachulia	October 7	Galatasaray Medical Park	Turkey	Atlanta Hawks	Under contract until 2013	Yes	
Yi Jianlian*	October 8	Guangdong Southern Tigers	China	Washington Wizards	Unrestricted free agent	Yes	
Thabo Sefolosha	October 12	Fenerbahçe Ülker	Turkey	Oklahoma City Thunder	Under contract until 2013	Yes	
Ian Mahinmi*	October 13	STB Le Havre	France	Dallas Mavericks	Under contract until 2012	Yes	
Ronny Turiaf*	October 17	ASVEL Basket	France	New York Knicks	Under contract until 2012	Yes	
Hamed Haddadi*	October 19	Melli Haffari Ahvaz	Iran	Memphis Grizzlies	Restricted free agent	Yes	
J. J. Hickson	October 21	Bnei HaSharon	Israel	Sacramento Kings	Under contract until 2013	Yes	
Serge Ibaka*	October 25	Real Madrid	Spain	Oklahoma City Thunder	Under contract until 2013	Yes	
Christian Eyenga	October 27	FIATC Joventut	Spain	Cleveland Cavaliers	Under contract until 2013	Yes	
Darnell Jackson	November 2	BC Donetsk	Ukraine	Sacramento Kings	Unrestricted free agent	Yes	
Alexis Ajinça*	November 10	Hyères-Toulon	France	Toronto Raptors	Unrestricted free agent	Yes	
Andrés Nocioni*	November 14	Peñarol	Argentina	Philadelphia 76ers	Under contract until 2012	Yes	
Omri Casspi*	November 15	Maccabi Tel Aviv	Israel	Cleveland Cavaliers	Under contract until 2013	Yes	
Tiago Splitter	November 16	Valencia BC	Spain	San Antonio Spurs	Under contract until 2013	Yes	
Aaron Brooks	November 18	Guangdong Southern Tigers	China	Phoenix Suns	Restricted free agent	No	
Goran Dragić	November 20	Caja Laboral	Spain	Houston Rockets	Under contract until 2012	Yes	
Jordan Williams	November 20	Zastal Zielona Góra	Poland	New Jersey Nets (played for Maryland before the draft)	Unsigned draft pick	Yes	
Ekpe Udoh	November 21	Bnei HaSharon	Israel	Golden State Warriors	Under contract until 2013	Yes	
T. J. Ford	November 22	KK Zagreb	Croatia	Indiana Pacers	Unrestricted free agent	Yes	
Tyreke Evans	November 24	Virtus Roma	Italy	Sacramento Kings	Under contract until 2013	Yes	
Chase Budinger	November 24	Lokomotiv-Kuban	Russia	Houston Rockets	Under contract until 2012	Yes	
Charles Jenkins	November 24	Bancatercas Teramo	Italy	Golden State Warriors (played for Hofstra before the draft)	Unsigned draft pick	Yes	

==== After the lockout ====
Player	Date signed	New team	New country	NBA team	NBA contract status	Ref
Kyle Singler	November 30	Real Madrid	Spain	Detroit Pistons (played for Duke before the draft)	Unsigned draft pick	
Andy Rautins	December 21	Lucentum Alicante	Spain	Dallas Mavericks	Unrestricted free agent (waived on December 15)	
Carlos Arroyo	December 22	Beşiktaş Milangaz	Turkey	Boston Celtics	Unrestricted free agent	
Gani Lawal	December 28	Xinjiang Flying Tigers	China	San Antonio Spurs	Unrestricted free agent (waived on December 22)	
Alexis Ajinça*	December 29	Strasbourg IG	France	Toronto Raptors	Unrestricted free agent	
Charlie Bell	January 2	Pepsi Caserta	Italy	Golden State Warriors	Unrestricted free agent (waived on December 11)	
Pape Sy*	January 3	BCM Gravelines	France	Atlanta Hawks	Unrestricted free agent (waived on December 23)	
Jeff Adrien	February 17	BC Khimki	Russia	Houston Rockets	Unrestricted free agent (waived on February 7)	
Al Thornton	February 19	Brujos de Guayama	Puerto Rico	Golden State Warriors	Unrestricted free agent	
Ike Diogu	February 21	Xinjiang Flying Tigers	China	San Antonio Spurs	Unrestricted free agent (waived on January 11)	
Earl Barron	February 26	Meralco Bolts	Philippines	Golden State Warriors	Unrestricted free agent (waived on February 6)	
Zabian Dowdell	February 29	Gran Canaria	Spain	Phoenix Suns	Unrestricted free agent (waived on December 13)	
Melvin Ely	March 2	Brujos de Guayama	Puerto Rico	Charlotte Bobcats	Unrestricted free agent (waived on December 23)	
Marcus Cousin	March 5	Guaiqueríes de Margarita	Venezuela	Houston Rockets	Unrestricted free agent (waived on December 24)	
Leon Powe	March 8	Atléticos de San Germán	Puerto Rico	Memphis Grizzlies	Unrestricted free agent	
Andrés Nocioni	March 23	Caja Laboral	Spain	Philadelphia 76ers	Unrestricted free agent (waived on March 20)	

== Draft ==
=== 2011 NBA draft ===
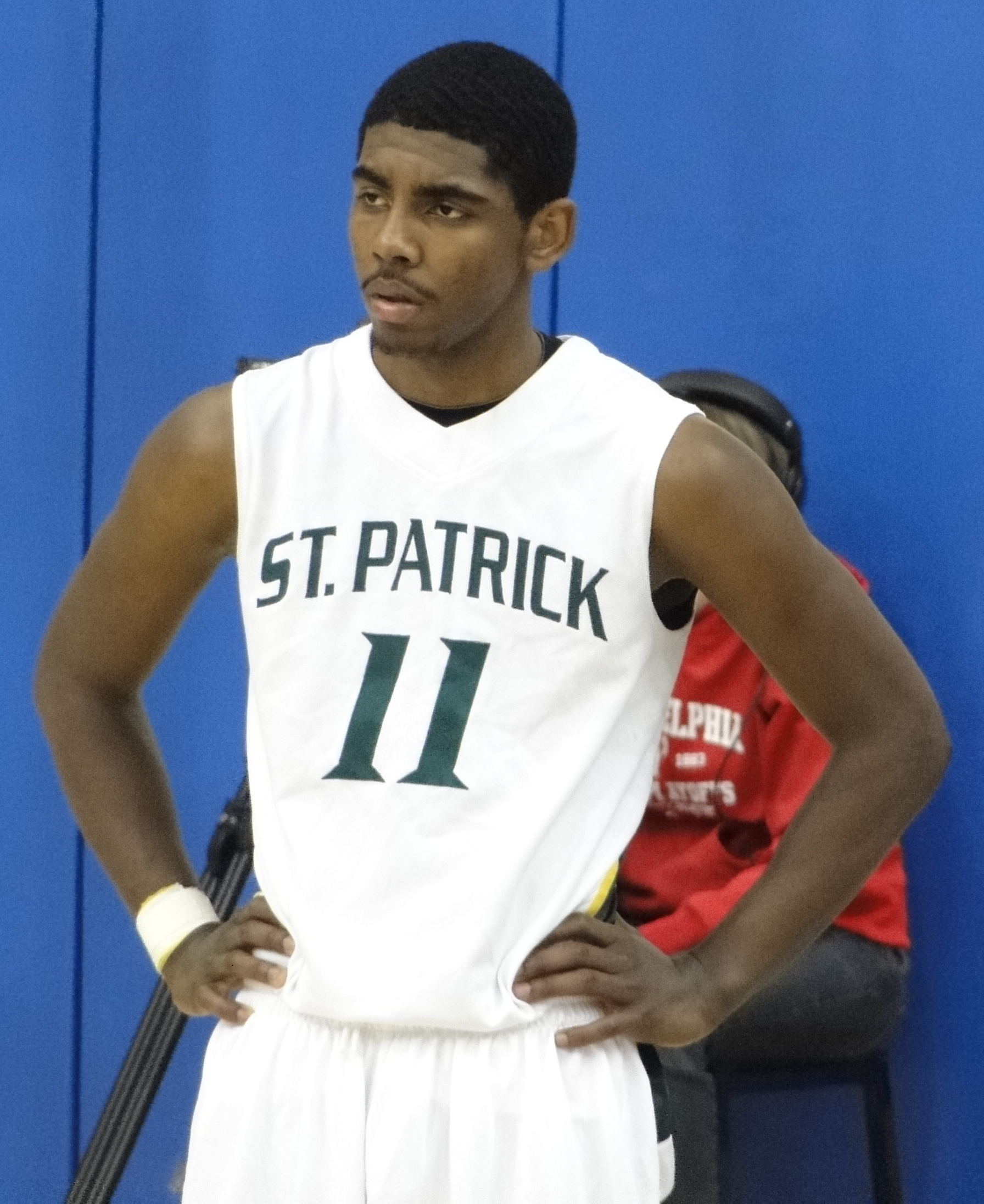
Kyrie Irving, first overall pick by Cleveland

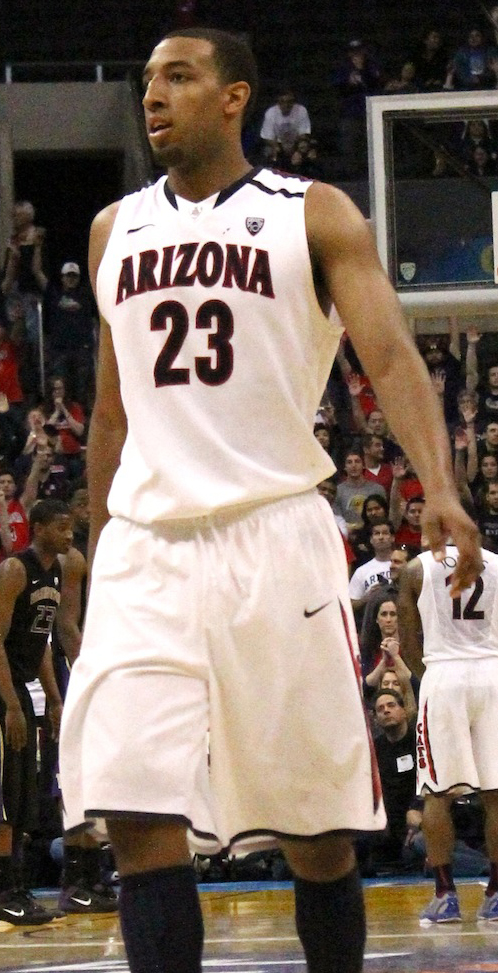
Derrick Williams, second overall pick by Minnesota

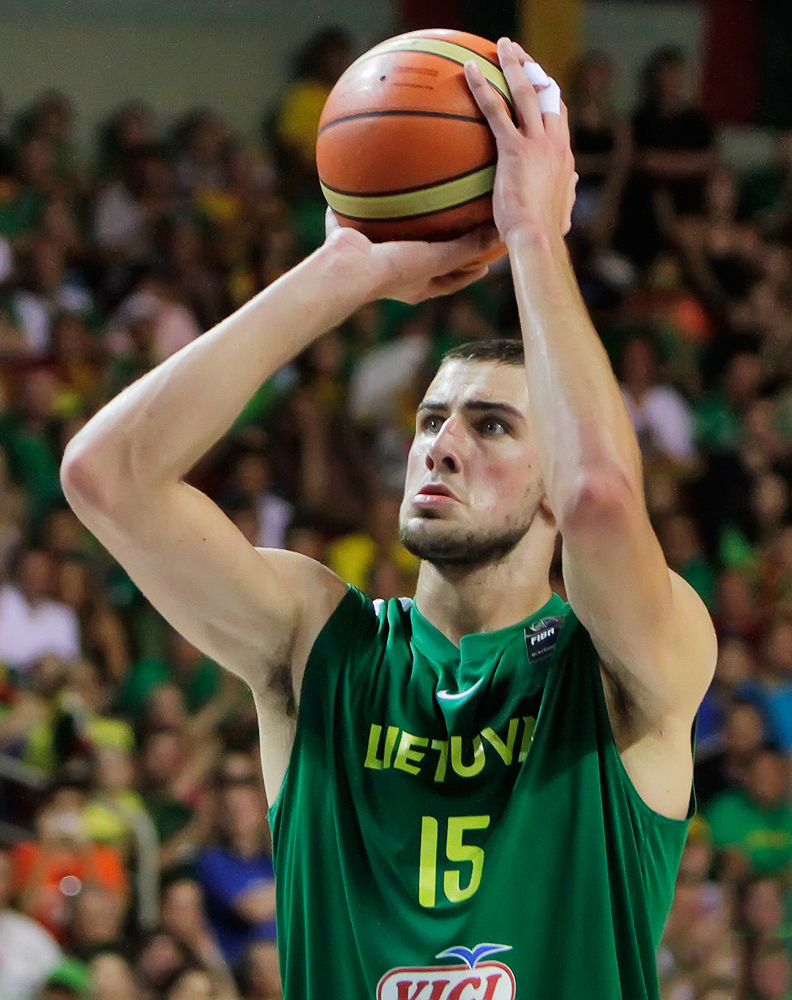
Jonas Valančiūnas, fifth overall pick by Toronto

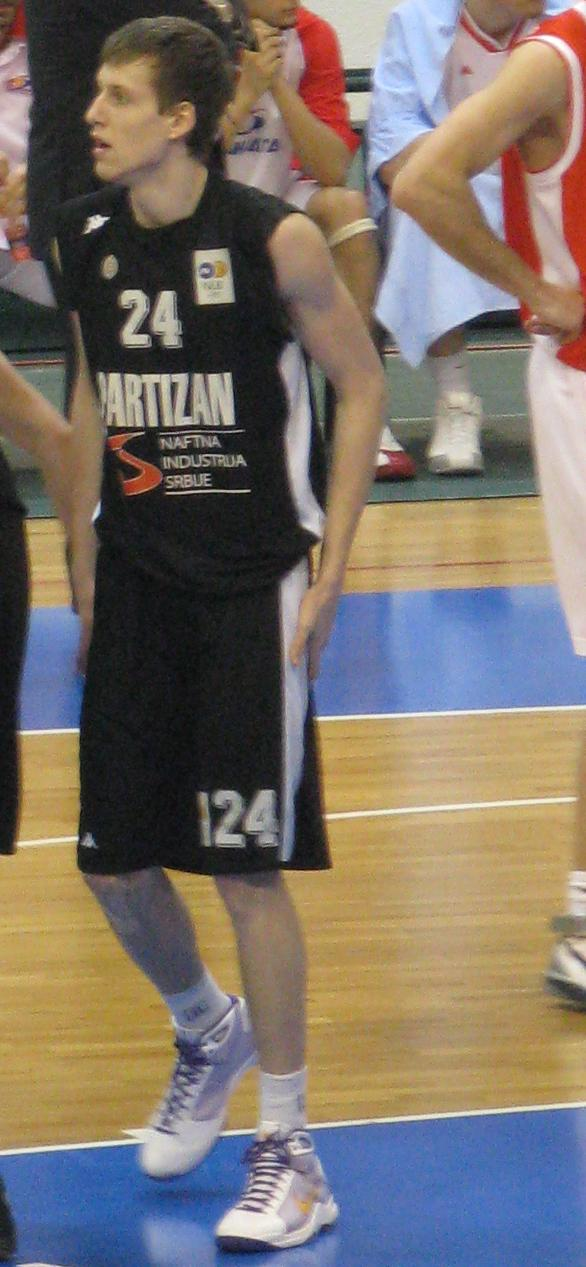
Jan Veselý, sixth overall pick by Washington

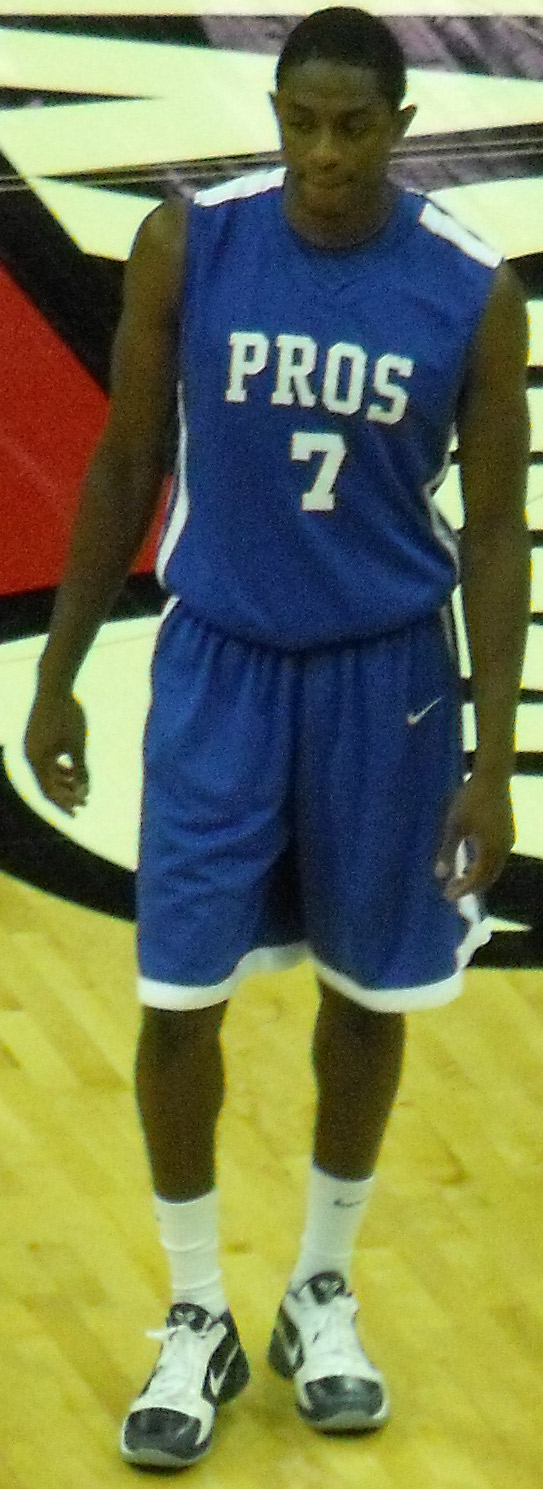
Brandon Knight, eighth overall pick by Detroit

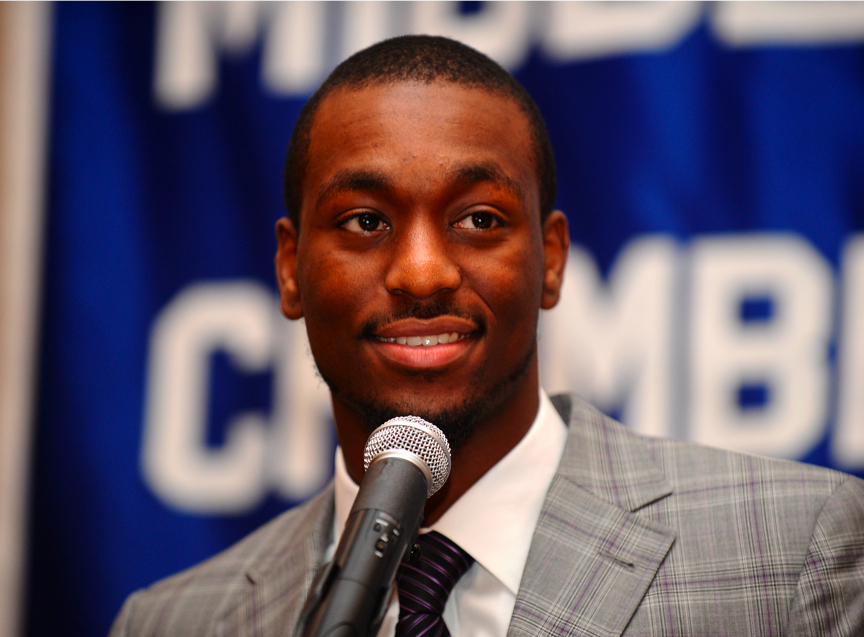
Kemba Walker, ninth overall pick by Charlotte

The 2011 NBA draft was held on June 23, 2011, at Prudential Center in Newark, New Jersey. In two rounds 60 players were selected in the draft. 27 of the 30 first-round picks signed rookie contracts and were named in the 2010–11 season opening day roster. 21 of the 30 second-round picks also signed rookie contracts, but one of them was waived before the start of the season and became a free agent. 12 other draft picks were unsigned but their draft rights are still held by the NBA teams.

==== First round ====
Pick	Player	Date signed	Team (Note: Team denotes the team that holds the players' draft rights. Teams in parentheses denotes the teams that drafted the players before any trade occurred.)	School/club team	Ref
1	Kyrie Irving	December 9	Cleveland Cavaliers	Duke (Fr.)	
2	Derrick Williams	December 12	Minnesota Timberwolves	Arizona (So.)	
3	Enes Kanter	December 9	Utah Jazz	Kentucky (Fr.)	
4	Tristan Thompson	December 9	Cleveland Cavaliers	Texas (Fr.)	
5	Jonas Valančiūnas		Toronto Raptors	Lietuvos Rytas (Lithuania)	
6	Jan Veselý	December 9	Washington Wizards	Partizan (Serbia)	
7	Bismack Biyombo	December 19	Charlotte Bobcats (acquired from Sacramento)	Fuenlabrada (Spain)	
8	Brandon Knight	December 9	Detroit Pistons	Kentucky (Fr.)	
9	Kemba Walker	December 11	Charlotte Bobcats	Connecticut (Jr.)	
10	Jimmer Fredette	December 9	Sacramento Kings (acquired from Milwaukee)	BYU (Sr.)	
11	Klay Thompson	December 13	Golden State Warriors	Washington State (Jr.)	
12	Alec Burks	December 9	Utah Jazz	Colorado (So.)	
13	Markieff Morris	December 9	Phoenix Suns	Kansas (Jr.)	
14	Marcus Morris	December 12	Houston Rockets	Kansas (Jr.)	
15	Kawhi Leonard	December 10	San Antonio Spurs (acquired from Indiana)	San Diego State (So.)	
16	Nikola Vučević	December 9	Philadelphia 76ers	USC (Jr.)	
17	Iman Shumpert	December 11	New York Knicks	Georgia Tech (Jr.)	
18	Chris Singleton	December 9	Washington Wizards	Florida State (Jr.)	
19	Tobias Harris	December 10	Milwaukee Bucks (acquired from Charlotte)	Tennessee (Fr.)	
20	Donatas Motiejūnas		Houston Rockets (acquired from Minnesota)	Benetton Treviso (Italy)	
21	Nolan Smith	December 9	Portland Trail Blazers	Duke (Sr.)	
22	Kenneth Faried	December 9	Denver Nuggets	Morehead State (Sr.)	
23	Nikola Mirotić		Chicago Bulls (acquired from Houston via Minnesota)	Real Madrid (Spain)	
24	Reggie Jackson	December 10	Oklahoma City Thunder	Boston College (Jr.)	
25	MarShon Brooks	December 9	New Jersey Nets (acquired from Boston)	Providence (Sr.)	
26	Jordan Hamilton	December 9	Denver Nuggets (acquired from Dallas)	Texas (So.)	
27	JaJuan Johnson	December 12	Boston Celtics (acquired from New Jersey)	Purdue (Sr.)	
28	Norris Cole	December 9	Miami Heat (acquired from Chicago via Minnesota)	Cleveland State (Sr.)	
29	Cory Joseph	December 16	San Antonio Spurs	Texas (Fr.)	
30	Jimmy Butler	December 9	Chicago Bulls	Marquette (Sr.)	

==== Second round ====
Pick	Player	Date signed	Team	School/club team	Ref
31	Bojan Bogdanović		New Jersey Nets (acquired from Miami via Minnesota)	Fenerbahçe Ülker (Turkey)	
32	Justin Harper	December 9	Orlando Magic (acquired from Cleveland)	Richmond (Sr.)	
33	Kyle Singler		Detroit Pistons	Duke (Sr.)	
34	Shelvin Mack	December 9	Washington Wizards	Butler (Jr.)	
35	Tyler Honeycutt	December 9	Sacramento Kings	UCLA (So.)	
36	Jordan Williams	December 9	New Jersey Nets	Maryland (So.)	
37	Trey Thompkins	December 9	Los Angeles Clippers (from Detroit)	Georgia (Jr.)	
38	Chandler Parsons	December 18	Houston Rockets	Florida (Sr.)	
39	Jeremy Tyler	December 13	Golden State Warriors (acquired from Charlotte)	Tokyo Apache (Japan)	
40	Jon Leuer	December 15	Milwaukee Bucks	Wisconsin (Sr.)	
41	Darius Morris	December 9	Los Angeles Lakers	Michigan (So.)	
42	Dāvis Bertāns		San Antonio Spurs (acquired from Indiana)	Union Olimpija (Slovenia)	
43	Malcolm Lee	December 15	Minnesota Timberwolves (acquired from Chicago)	UCLA (Jr.)	
44	Charles Jenkins	December 9	Golden State Warriors	Hofstra (Sr.)	
45	Josh Harrellson	December 11	New York Knicks (acquired from New Orleans)	Kentucky (Sr.)	
46	Andrew Goudelock	December 9	Los Angeles Lakers	Charleston (Sr.)	
47	Travis Leslie	December 9	Los Angeles Clippers	Georgia (Jr.)	
48	Keith Benson	December 9 (waived on December 23)	Atlanta Hawks	Oakland (Sr.)	
49	Josh Selby	December 10	Memphis Grizzlies	Kansas (Fr.)	
50	Lavoy Allen	December 9	Philadelphia 76ers	Temple (Sr.)	
51	Jon Diebler		Portland Trail Blazers	Ohio State (Sr.)	
52	Vernon Macklin	December 9	Detroit Pistons	Florida (Sr.)	
53	DeAndre Liggins	December 9	Orlando Magic	Kentucky (Jr.)	
54	Milan Mačvan		Cleveland Cavaliers	Maccabi Tel Aviv (Israel)	
55	E'Twaun Moore	December 12	Boston Celtics	Purdue (Sr.)	
56	Chukwudiebere Maduabum		Denver Nuggets (acquired from L.A. Lakers)	Bakersfield Jam (D-League)	
57	Tanguy Ngombo		Minnesota Timberwolves (acquired from Dallas via Portland)	Al Rayyan (Qatar)	
58	Ater Majok		Los Angeles Lakers	Gold Coast Blaze (Australia)	
59	Ádám Hanga		San Antonio Spurs	Assignia Manresa (Spain)	
60	Isaiah Thomas	December 9	Sacramento Kings	Washington (Jr.)	

=== Previous years' draftees ===
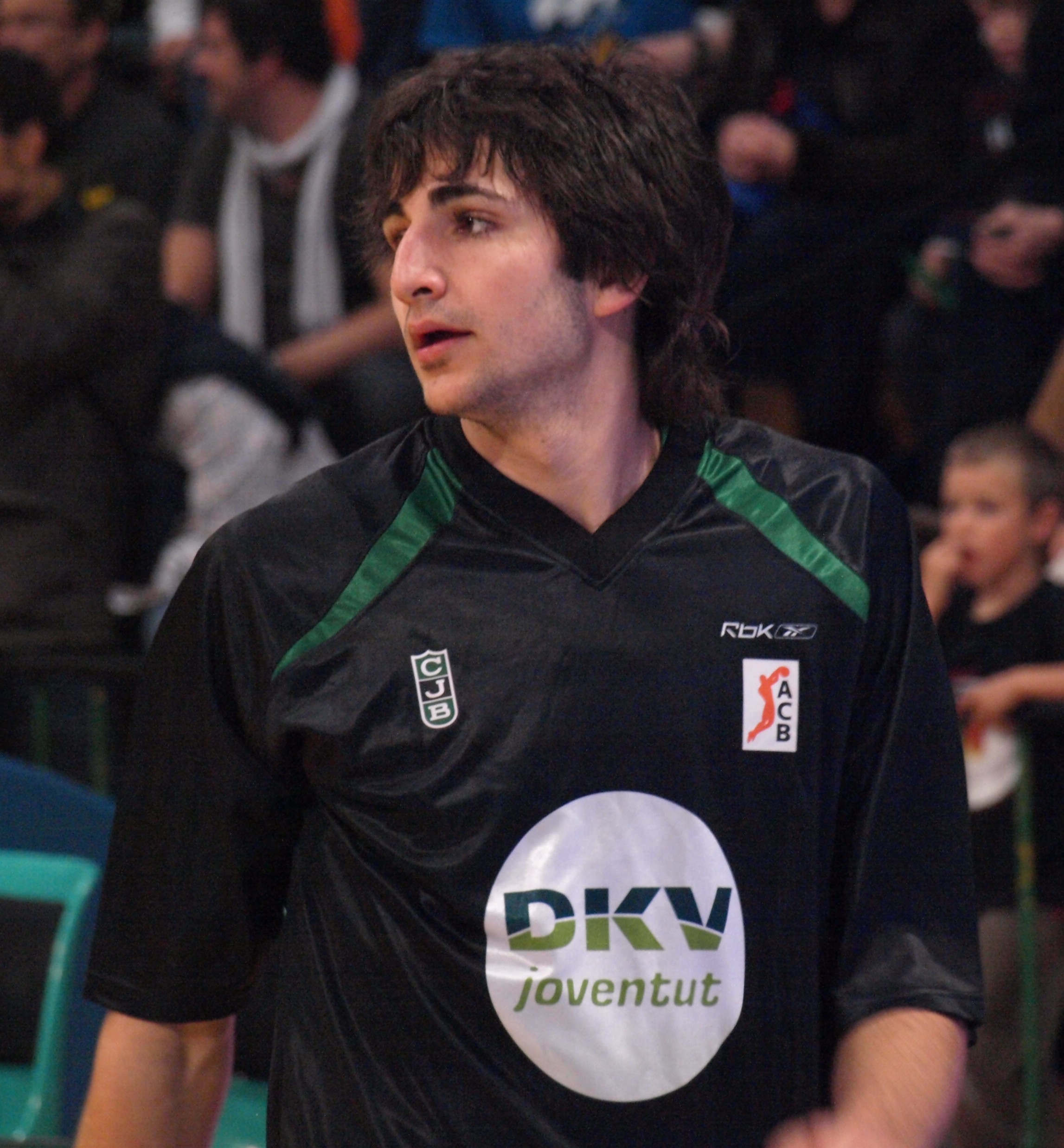
Ricky Rubio was drafted in 2009 by Minnesota.

Draft	Pick	Player	Date signed	Team	Previous team	Ref
2009	5	Ricky Rubio	June 16	Minnesota Timberwolves	Regal FC Barcelona (Spain)	
2010	44	Jerome Jordan	December 15	New York Knicks (acquired from Milwaukee)	BC Krka (Slovenia)	
2010	57	Ryan Reid	December 13	Oklahoma City Thunder (acquired from Indiana)	Tulsa 66ers (D-League)	
