= Small market =

Disadvantages of a sports team being in a smaller market

In the terminology of professional sports in North America, teams are often said to be based not only in a city, but in a media market as well. The size of the media market is a significant indication of the potential long-term success of a major league franchise. A small market team is a team that has a small market compared to teams in larger markets.

A small market team often struggles to compete financially against teams from larger markets and therefore, is also often outbid in the competition for top talent, as large market teams have more financial resources available to the free agent being chased by teams. Small market teams cannot realistically afford high-priced free agents, which results in the small market team being forced to explore elsewhere on players to chase after.

Small market teams are often forced to sell their talent to teams in larger markets in trades for younger, less expensive players, especially when the specified small market team is not actively competitive. This has led to calls for revenue sharing, luxury taxes, or salary caps in most North American sports leagues in order to ensure competitive balance or parity. However, Major League Baseball remains without a salary cap despite numerous attempts to implement one.

== See also ==
- List of North American media markets
