= 2011–12 Cleveland Cavaliers season =

NBA professional basketball team season

- Head coach: Byron Scott
- General manager: Chris Grant
- Owner: Dan Gilbert
- Arena: Quicken Loans Arena

Results
- Record: 21–45 (.318)
- Place: Division: 5th (Central); Conference: 13th (Eastern)
- Playoff finish: Did not qualify
- Stats at Basketball Reference

Local media
- Television: Fox Sports Ohio; WUAB
- Radio: WTAM

The 2011–12 Cleveland Cavaliers season was the 42nd season of the franchise in the National Basketball Association (NBA).

== Key dates ==
- May 17 – The 2011 NBA Draft Lottery took place, and the Cavaliers got the first pick.
- June 23 – The 2011 NBA draft took place in Newark, New Jersey, at the Prudential Center. The Cavaliers picked Kyrie Irving (#1), Tristan Thompson (#4), Milan Mačvan (#54). They also drafted Justin Harper (#32), but immediately traded him to the Orlando Magic for two future second-round picks (2013 and 2014).
- June 29 – The Cavs exercise the third-year option on Christian Eyenga, keeping him under contract until the 2012–13 season.
- June 30 – J.J. Hickson is sent to the Sacramento Kings, for Omri Casspi and a protected future first round pick.
- July 7 – The Cavaliers set an NBA D-League team in Canton, Ohio. The Cavs announced that they will own and control all the operations of the former Albuquerque/New Mexico Thunderbirds. On October 13, the new name, logo, colors and court design are unveiled, the Canton Charge.
- December 9 – Training Camp begins. The Cavs also signed with rookies Kyrie Irving and Tristan Thompson. They also waived Joey Graham.
- December 12 – Anthony Parker re-signed with the Cavaliers.
- December 14 – The Cavs decided to waive Baron Davis.
- December 16 – The Cavaliers opened their pre-season with a victory over the Detroit Pistons in The Palace of Auburn Hills.
- December 20 – The Cavs closed their pre-season with a loss against the Pistons in Quicken Loans Arena, with a 1–1 record.
- December 22 – Manny Harris is waived by the Cavs.
- December 26 – The Cavaliers opened their season with a loss against the Toronto Raptors in the Quicken Loans Arena.
- January 4 – Christian Eyenga is assigned to the Canton Charge.
- January 23 – The Cavs recall Christian Eyenga.
- February 10 – The Cavaliers sign a 10-day contract with Ben Uzoh, of the Rio Grande Valley Vipers.
- February 21 – Manny Harris sign a 10-day contract with the Cavs.

== Draft picks ==
Round	Pick	Player	Position	Nationality	College/Club Team
1	1	Kyrie Irving	G	United States	Duke
1	4	Tristan Thompson	F	Canada	Texas
2	32	Justin Harper	F	United States	Richmond
2	54	Milan Mačvan	PF	Serbia	Maccabi Tel Aviv

== Roster ==
2011–12 Cleveland Cavaliers roster
Players

Pos.	No.	Player	Height	Weight	DOB	From
SF	36	Omri Casspi	6 ft 9 in (2.06 m)	225 lb (102 kg)	1988-06-22	Israel
C	9	Semih Erden	7 ft 0 in (2.13 m)	240 lb (109 kg)	1986-07-28	Turkey
SG	33	Alonzo Gee	6 ft 6 in (1.98 m)	219 lb (99 kg)	1987-05-29	Alabama
SG	1	Daniel Gibson	6 ft 2 in (1.88 m)	200 lb (91 kg)	1986-02-27	Texas
PF	44	Luke Harangody	6 ft 7 in (2.01 m)	245 lb (111 kg)	1988-01-02	Notre Dame
SG	6	Manny Harris	6 ft 5 in (1.96 m)	185 lb (84 kg)	1989-09-21	Michigan
PG	2	Kyrie Irving	6 ft 3 in (1.91 m)	191 lb (87 kg)	1992-03-23	Duke
PF	4	Antawn Jamison	6 ft 9 in (2.06 m)	235 lb (107 kg)	1976-06-12	North Carolina
SF	12	D. J. Kennedy	6 ft 6 in (1.98 m)	214 lb (97 kg)	1989-11-05	St. John's
SF	18	Anthony Parker	6 ft 6 in (1.98 m)	210 lb (95 kg)	1975-06-19	Bradley
C	24	Samardo Samuels	6 ft 9 in (2.06 m)	260 lb (118 kg)	1989-01-09	Louisville
PG	15	Donald Sloan	6 ft 3 in (1.91 m)	205 lb (93 kg)	1988-01-15	Texas A&M
F/C	13	Tristan Thompson	6 ft 9 in (2.06 m)	227 lb (103 kg)	1991-03-13	Texas
C	17	Anderson Varejão	6 ft 11 in (2.11 m)	260 lb (118 kg)	1982-09-28	Brazil
F	32	Luke Walton	6 ft 8 in (2.03 m)	235 lb (107 kg)	1980-03-28	Arizona

Coaches
Head coach
- Byron Scott
Assistant(s)
- Jamahl Mosley
- Paul Pressey
- Joe Prunty
- Nate Tibbetts

Legend
- (DP) Unsigned draft pick
- (FA) Free agent
- (S) Suspended
- Injured

Roster
Updated: April 21, 2012

== Pre-season ==
2011 pre-season game log
Pre-season: 1–1 (home: 0–1; road: 1–0)

Game	Date	Team	Score	High points	High rebounds	High assists	Location Attendance	Record
1	December 16	@ Detroit Pistons	W 91–87	Kyrie Irving (20)	Alonzo Gee (8)	Ramon Sessions (6)	The Palace of Auburn Hills; 7,927	1–0
2	December 20	Detroit Pistons	L 89–90	Omri Casspi (18)	Anderson Varejão (10)	Ramon Sessions (8)	Quicken Loans Arena; 9,853	1-1

2011–12 season schedule

The original 2011 NBA Pre-season was canceled due to the 2011 NBA Lockout. After the lockout, the NBA created a new two game Pre-Season.

== Regular season ==
=== Standings ===
Central Division	W	L	PCT	GB	Home	Road	Div	GP
z-Chicago Bulls	50	16	.758	–	26–7	24–9	13–1	66
x-Indiana Pacers	42	24	.636	8	23–10	19–14	9–4	66
Milwaukee Bucks	31	35	.470	19	17–16	14–19	7–8	66
Detroit Pistons	25	41	.379	25	18–15	7–26	4–11	66
Cleveland Cavaliers	21	45	.318	29	11–22	10–23	3–12	66

Eastern Conference
#	Team	W	L	PCT	GB	GP
1	z-Chicago Bulls	50	16	.758	–	66
2	y-Miami Heat *	46	20	.697	4.0	66
3	x-Indiana Pacers *	42	24	.636	8.0	66
4	y-Boston Celtics	39	27	.591	11.0	66
5	x-Atlanta Hawks	40	26	.606	10.0	66
6	x-Orlando Magic	37	29	.561	13.0	66
7	x-New York Knicks	36	30	.545	14.0	66
8	x-Philadelphia 76ers	35	31	.530	15.0	66
9	Milwaukee Bucks	31	35	.470	19.0	66
10	Detroit Pistons	25	41	.379	25.0	66
11	Toronto Raptors	23	43	.348	27.0	66
12	New Jersey Nets	22	44	.333	28.0	66
13	Cleveland Cavaliers	21	45	.318	29.0	66
14	Washington Wizards	20	46	.303	30.0	66
15	Charlotte Bobcats	7	59	.106	43.0	66

=== Game log ===
2011–12 game log
Total: 21–45 (Home: 11–22; Road: 10–23)
December: 1–2 (home: 0–1; road: 1–1)

Game	Date	Team	Score	High points	High rebounds	High assists	Location Attendance	Record
1	December 26	Toronto	L 96–104	Ramon Sessions (18)	Anderson Varejão (10)	Kyrie Irving (7)	Quicken Loans Arena; 20,562	0–1
2	December 28	@ Detroit	W 105–89	Samardo Samuels (17)	Anderson Varejão, Ramon Sessions (7)	Kyrie Irving (7)	The Palace of Auburn Hills; 22,076	1–1
3	December 30	@ Indiana	L 91–98 (OT)	Kyrie Irving (20)	Anderson Varejão (13)	Kyrie Irving, Alonzo Gee (4)	Bankers Life Fieldhouse; 13,004	1–2

January: 7–10 (home: 3–4; road: 4–6)

Game	Date	Team	Score	High points	High rebounds	High assists	Location Attendance	Record
4	January 1	New Jersey	W 98–82	Antawn Jamison (23)	Anderson Varejão (11)	Ramon Sessions (8)	Quicken Loans Arena; 15,084	2–2
5	January 3	Charlotte	W 115–101	Kyrie Irving (20)	Tristan Thompson (9)	Ramon Sessions (9)	Quicken Loans Arena; 14,173	3–2
6	January 4	@ Toronto	L 77–92	Antawn Jamison (19)	Anderson Varejão (13)	Kyrie Irving (4)	Air Canada Centre; 14,468	3–3
7	January 6	@ Minnesota	W 98–87	Antawn Jamison (22)	Anderson Varejão (12)	Ramon Sessions (6)	Target Center; 16,943	4–3
8	January 8	@ Portland	L 78–98	Kyrie Irving (21)	Antawn Jamison (11)	Kyrie Irving (4)	Rose Garden; 20,292	4–4
9	January 10	@ Utah	L 105–113	Antawn Jamison (22)	Anderson Varejão (11)	Kyrie Irving (5)	EnergySolutions Arena; 17,879	4–5
10	January 12	@ Phoenix	W 101–90	Kyrie Irving (26)	Anderson Varejão (17)	Kyrie Irving (6)	US Airways Center; 14,636	5–5
11	January 13	@ L. A. Lakers	L 92–97	Kyrie Irving (21)	Anderson Varejão (14)	Anthony Parker (5)	Staples Center; 18,997	5–6
12	January 16	@ Charlotte	W 102–94	Kyrie Irving (25)	Anderson Varejão (12)	Ramon Sessions (9)	Time Warner Cable Arena; 14,988	6–6
13	January 17	Golden State	L 95–105	Antawn Jamison (19)	Anderson Varejão (13)	Kyrie Irving (5)	Quicken Loans Arena; 13,056	6–7
14	January 20	Chicago	L 75–114	Anderson Varejão (14)	Antawn Jamison (8)	Anthony Parker, Kyrie Irving, Ramon Sessions (3)	Quicken Loans Arena; 17,871	6–8
15	January 21, 2012	@ Atlanta	L 94–121	Kyrie Irving (18)	Anderson Varejão (8)	Ramon Sessions (4)	Philips Arena; 15,922	6–9
16	January 24	@ Miami	L 85–92	Kyrie Irving (17)	Anderson Varejão (11)	Kyrie Irving, Antawn Jamison (4)	American Airlines Arena; 19,600	6–10
17	January 25	New York	W 91–81	Antawn Jamison (15)	Anderson Varejão (16)	Kyrie Irving (7)	Quicken Loans Arena; 16,760	7–10
18	January 27	New Jersey	L 96–99	Kyrie Irving (32)	Anderson Varejão (9)	Daniel Gibson (4)	Quicken Loans Arena; 13,121	7–11
19	January 29	@ Boston	W 88–87	Kyrie Irving (23)	Anderson Varejão (9)	Kyrie Irving (6)	TD Garden; 18,624	8–11
20	January 31	Boston	L 90–93	Kyrie Irving (21)	Anderson Varejão (20)	Ramon Sessions (10)	Quicken Loans Arena; 14,798	8–12

February: 5–8 (home: 5–5; road: 0–3)

Game	Date	Team	Score	High points	High rebounds	High assists	Location Attendance	Record
21	February 3	@ Orlando	L 94–102	Alonzo Gee (20)	Anderson Varejão (15)	Ramon Sessions (8)	Amway Center; 18,933	8–13
22	February 4	Dallas	W 91–88	Kyrie Irving (20)	Anderson Varejão (17)	Ramon Sessions (8)	Quicken Loans Arena; 17,433	9–13
23	February 7	@ Miami	L 91–107	Antawn Jamison (25)	Anderson Varejão (11)	Kyrie Irving (6)	American Airlines Arena20,078	9–14
24	February 8	L. A. Clippers	W 99–92	Antawn Jamison (27)	Anderson Varejão (11)	Ramon Sessions (13)	Quicken Loans Arena; 17,100	10–14
25	February 10	Milwaukee	L 112–113 (OT)	Antawn Jamison (34)	Tristan Thompson (13)	Ramon Sessions (16)	Quicken Loans Arena; 15,195	10–15
26	February 11	Philadelphia	L 84–99	Antawn Jamison (20)	Antawn Jamison (8)	Ramon Sessions (8)	Quicken Loans Arena	10–16
27	February 15	Indiana	W 98–87	Kyrie Irving (22)	David West (10)	Kyrie Irving (5)	Quicken Loans Arena	11–16
28	February 17	Miami	L 87–111	LeBron James (28)	Chris Bosh (12)	LeBron James (5)	Quicken Loans Arena	11–17
29	February 19	Sacramento	W 93–92	Kyrie Irving (23)	Omri Casspi (12)	Isaiah Thomas (11)	Quicken Loans Arena	12–17
30	February 21	Detroit	W 101–100	Antawn Jamison (32)	Alonzo Gee (11)	Kyrie Irving (8)	Quicken Loans Arena	13–17
31	February 22	New Orleans	L 84–89	Antawn Jamison (22)	Gustavo Ayon (17)	Kyrie Irving (11)	Quicken Loans Arena	13–18
All-Star Break
32	February 28	Boston	L 83–86	Kyrie Irving (24)	Chris Wilcox (11)	Rajon Rondo (11	Quicken Loans Arena	13–19
33	February 29	@ New York	L 103–120	Antawn Jamison (23)	Tyson Chandler (15)	Jeremy Lin (13)	Madison Square Garden	13–20

March: 4–13 (home: 1–7; road: 3–6)

Game	Date	Team	Score	High points	High rebounds	High assists	Location Attendance	Record
34	March 2	Chicago	L 91–112	Luol Deng (24)	Carlos Boozer (11)	Derrick Rose (9)	Quicken Loans Arena	13–21
35	March 3	@ Washington	L 98–101	Jordan Crawford (31)	JaVale McGee (12)	Kyrie Irving (6)	Verizon Center	13–22
36	March 5	Utah	L 100–109	Antawn Jamison, Kyrie Irving (22)	Five players (4)	Antawn Jamison (6)	Quicken Loans Arena; 13,190	13–23
37	March 7	@ Denver	W 100–99	Antawn Jamison (33)	Antawn Jamison (9)	Kyrie Irving (8)	Power Balance Pavilion; 15,816	14–23
38	March 9	@ Oklahoma City	W 96–90	Antawn Jamison (21)	Three players (8)	Kyrie Irving (12)	Chesapeake Energy Arena; 18,203	15–23
39	March 11	Houston	W 118–107	Antawn Jamison (28)	Kyrie Irving (6)	Ramon Sessions (7)	Quicken Loans Arena; 17,662	16–23
40	March 13	Toronto	L 88–96	Antawn Jamison (20)	Kyrie Irving (7)	Kyrie Irving (7)	Quicken Loans Arena; 14,203	16–24
41	March 14	@ Milwaukee	L 105–115	Kyrie Irving (28)	Alonzo Gee; Antawn Jamison (5)	Ramon Sessions (6)	Bradley Center; 15,319	16–25
42	March 18	Atlanta	L 87–103	Alonzo Gee (20)	Alonzo Gee (9)	Kyrie Irving (10)	Quicken Loans Arena; 15,645	16–26
43	March 19	@ New Jersey	W 105–100	Tristan Thompson (27)	Antawn Jamison (13)	Kyrie Irving (7)	Prudential Center; 11,254	17–26
44	March 21	@ Atlanta	L 102–103 (OT)	Kyrie Irving (29)	Alonzo Gee (13)	Kyrie Irving (9)	Philips Arena; 12,331	17–27
45	March 23	@ Orlando	L 80–93	Antawn Jamison (16)	Tristan Thompson (11)	Kyrie Irving (6)	Amway Center; 18,846	17–28
46	March 25	Phoenix	L 83–108	Kyrie Irving (16)	Manny Harris (9)	Kyrie Irving; Donald Sloan (4)	Quicken Loans Arena; 17,307	17–29
47	March 27	@ Philadelphia	L 85–103	Anthony Parker (14)	Alonzo Gee (9)	Kyrie Irving (7)	Wells Fargo Center; 17,832	17–30
48	March 28	Detroit	L 75–87	Kyrie Irving (22)	Tristan Thompson (11)	Kyrie Irving (6)	Quicken Loans Arena; 14,486	17–31
49	March 30	Milwaukee	L 84–121	Kyrie Irving (29)	Tristan Thompson (11)	Kyrie Irving (5)	Quicken Loans Arena; 16,099	17–32
50	March 31	@ New York	L 75–91	Antawn Jamison (13)	Antawn Jamison; Donald Sloan (7)	Donald Sloan (4)	Madison Square Garden; 19,763	17–33

April: 4–12 (home: 2–5; road: 2–7)

Game	Date	Team	Score	High points	High rebounds	High assists	Location Attendance	Record
51	April 3	San Antonio	L 90–125	Antawn Jamison (15)	Alonzo Gee (5)	Kyrie Irving; Luke Walton (5)	Quicken Loans Arena; 14,759	17–34
52	April 4	@ Milwaukee	L 98–107	Anthony Parker (27)	Tristan Thompson (9)	Donald Sloan (8)	Bradley Center; 11,849	17–35
53	April 6	@ Toronto	W 84–80	Antawn Jamison (25)	Antawn Jamison (8)	Lester Hudson (7)	Air Canada Centre; 16,565	18–35
54	April 8	@ New Jersey	L 117–122 (OT)	Antawn Jamison (34)	Tristan Thompson (15)	Donald Sloan (14)	Prudential Center; 11,341	18–36
55	April 10	Charlotte	W 103–90	Lester Hudson (25)	Lester Hudson (8)	Lester Hudson (6)	Quicken Loans Arena; 13,576	19–36
56	April 11	Indiana	L 98–104 (OT)	Antawn Jamison (21)	Antawn Jamison; Tristan Thompson (8)	Donald Sloan (6)	Quicken Loans Arena; 14,307	19–37
57	April 13	@ Indiana	L 83–102	Omri Casspi (14)	Samardo Samuels (10)	Donald Sloan (5)	Bankers Life Fieldhouse; 13,356	19–38
58	April 14	@ Washington	W 98–89	Luke Harangody (16)	Luke Harangody (10)	Anthony Parker (5)	Verizon Center; 17,200	20–38
59	April 15	Orlando	L 84–100	Antawn Jamison (21)	Alonzo Gee; Tristan Thompson (8)	Antawn Jamison (6)	Quicken Loans Arena; 16,305	20–39
60	April 17	@ Detroit	L 77–116	Manny Harris (18)	Tristan Thompson (13)	Donald Sloan (4)	The Palace of Auburn Hills; 11,595	20–40
61	April 18	Philadelphia	L 87–103	Samardo Samuels; Lester Hudson (15)	Samardo Samuels; Tristan Thompson (5)	Donald Sloan (7)	Quicken Loans Arena; 14,678	20–41
62	April 20	New York	W 98–90	Kyrie Irving (21)	Manny Harris (12)	Antawn Jamison (5)	Quicken Loans Arena; 19,349	21–41
63	April 22	@ San Antonio	L 98–114	Antawn Jamison (21)	Tristan Thompson (9)	Anthony Parker (4)	AT&T Center; 18,581	21–42
64	April 23	@ Memphis	L 101–109	Kyrie Irving (25)	Antawn Jamison; Tristan Thompson (9)	Kyrie Irving (4)	FedExForum; 15,504	21–43
65	April 25	Washington	L 85–96	D.J. Kennedy (12)	Samardo Samuels (9)	Donald Sloan (7)	Quicken Loans Arena; 18,086	21–44
66	April 26	@ Chicago	L 75–107	Tristan Thompson (13)	Tristan Thompson (12)	Donald Sloan; Luke Walton (2)	United Center; 22,563	21–45

2011–12 season schedule

All the games through December 24 were canceled due to the 2011 NBA Lockout. A new schedule was created starting in December 25.

== Player statistics ==
Legend
GP	Games played	GS	Games started	MPG	Minutes per game
FG%	Field-goal percentage	3P%	3-point field-goal percentage	FT%	Free-throw percentage
RPG	Rebounds per game	APG	Assists per game	SPG	Steals per game
BPG	Blocks per game	PPG	Points per game

=== Regular season ===
Player	GP	GS	MPG	FG%	3P%	FT%	RPG	APG	SPG	BPG	PPG
Kyrie Irving	51	51	30.5	.469	.399	.872	3.7	5.4	1.1	.4	18.5
Antawn Jamison	65	65	33.1	.403	.341	.683	6.3	2.0	.8	.7	17.2
Lester Hudson	13	0	24.2	.391	.246	.842	3.5	2.7	1.1	.2	12.7
Anderson Varejão	25	25	31.4	.514	.000	.672	11.5	1.7	1.4	.7	10.8
Alonzo Gee	63	31	29.0	.412	.321	.788	5.1	1.8	1.3	.3	10.6
Ramon Sessions	41	4	24.5	.398	.419	.830	3.1	5.2	.7	.0	10.5
Tristan Thompson	60	25	23.7	.439	.000	.552	6.5	.5	.5	1.0	8.2
Daniel Gibson	35	7	26.2	.351	.396	.791	2.9	2.2	.7	.5	7.5
Anthony Parker	51	51	25.1	.433	.362	.625	2.7	2.4	.7	.1	7.2
Omri Casspi	65	35	20.6	.403	.315	.685	3.5	1.0	.6	.3	7.1
Manny Harris	26	5	17.5	.400	.333	.695	2.7	1.2	.5	.2	6.7
Donald Sloan	25	11	24.3	.403	.091	.808	2.4	3.7	.4	.1	6.6
D. J. Kennedy	2	0	29.5	.417	.500	.000	3.5	1.5	1.0	.0	6.0
Samardo Samuels	54	0	15.3	.455		.701	3.3	.4	.4	.4	5.4
Ryan Hollins	24	7	15.1	.500		.600	2.3	.3	.2	.5	3.7
Mychel Thompson	5	3	19.0	.292	.364		1.0	1.4	.4	.2	3.6
Semih Erden	28	9	11.9	.527		.512	2.6	.3	.4	.2	3.5
Luke Harangody	21	1	11.0	.354	.238	.750	2.5	.3	.3	.1	2.9
Ben Uzoh	2	0	6.5	.400			2.0	1.0	.5	.0	2.0
Luke Walton	21	0	14.2	.353	.438		1.7	1.4	.1	.0	2.0
Christian Eyenga	6	0	13.8	.158	.500	.333	2.0	.7	.5	.7	1.5

== Awards, records and milestones ==
=== Awards ===
- Kyrie Irving was named Eastern Conference Rookie of the Month three times (December – January, February and March) and won the NBA Rookie of the Year Award.
- Rookies Kyrie Irving and Tristan Thompson were selected to participate in the 2012 Rising Stars challenge.

=== Milestones ===
- On March 31 Antawn Jamison scored his 19,000th career point in a 75–91 loss to the New York Knicks.
- On January 31 Kyrie Irving made his first game-winning basket against the Boston Celtics.

== Injuries, surgeries and absences ==
- Semih Erden had a fracture in his right thumb and missed the first seven games of the regular season. In April, he sprained his right ankle and missed the remainder of the season.
- Kyrie Irving suffered a concussion during a game against the Miami Heat on February 7 and missed the following 3 games.
- Anderson Varejão broke his wrist on February 10 during a game against the Milwaukee Bucks and missed the remainder of the season.

== Transactions ==
=== Free agents ===
==== Additions ====
Date	Player	Signed	Former team
February 10, 2012	Ben Uzoh	NBA D-League	Rio Grande Valley Vipers
February 21, 2012	Manny Harris	NBA D-League	Canton Charge

==== Subtractions ====
Date	Player	Reason left	New team
December 9, 2011	Joey Graham	Waived	Free Agent
December 14, 2011	Baron Davis	Waived	New York Knicks
December 22, 2011	Manny Harris	Waived	Canton Charge

=== Trades ===
June 23, 2011
June 30, 2011
To Cleveland Cavaliers

- 2013 second-round pick
- 2014 second-round pick
To Cleveland Cavaliers

- (Israel) Omri Casspi
- Future first-round pick
To Orlando Magic

- (United States) Justin Harper
To Sacramento Kings

- (United States) J.J. Hickson
