= Ramon Sessions =

American basketball player (born 1986)

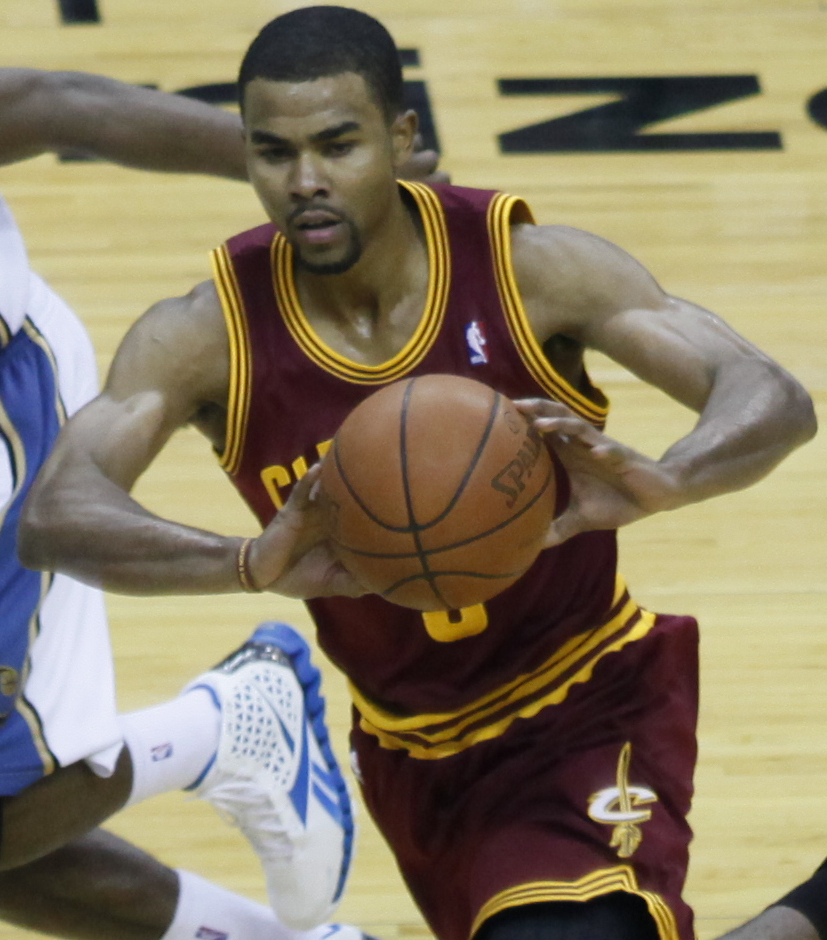
- Sessions with the Cleveland Cavaliers in 2010

Personal information
- Born: April 11, 1986 (age 40) Myrtle Beach, South Carolina, U.S.
- Listed height: 6 ft 3 in (1.91 m)
- Listed weight: 190 lb (86 kg)

Career information
- High school: Myrtle Beach (Myrtle Beach, South Carolina)
- College: Nevada (2004–2007)
- NBA draft: 2007: 2nd round, 56th overall pick
- Drafted by: Milwaukee Bucks
- Playing career: 2007–2018
- Position: Point guard
- Number: 7, 3, 13, 9, 1

Career history
- 2007–2009: Milwaukee Bucks
- 2007–2008: →Tulsa 66ers
- 2009–2010: Minnesota Timberwolves
- 2010–2012: Cleveland Cavaliers
- 2012: Los Angeles Lakers
- 2012–2014: Charlotte Bobcats
- 2014: Milwaukee Bucks
- 2014–2015: Sacramento Kings
- 2015–2016: Washington Wizards
- 2016–2017: Charlotte Hornets
- 2017–2018: New York Knicks
- 2018: Washington Wizards
- 2018: Maccabi Tel Aviv

Career highlights
- Second-team All-WAC (2007); WAC All-Newcomer Team (2005)
- Stats at NBA.com
- Stats at Basketball Reference

Ramon Darrell Sessions (born April 11, 1986) is an American former professional basketball player. He played college basketball for the Nevada Wolf Pack, earning WAC All-Newcomer Team as a freshman and second-team All-WAC as a junior. He was drafted by the Milwaukee Bucks with the 56th overall pick in the 2007 NBA draft and went on to become an NBA journeyman, spending time with eight franchises over 11 years. In 2018, he moved to Israel to play overseas for the first time.

== High school and college career ==
Sessions was named South Carolina 3A State Player of the Year three times while attending Myrtle Beach High School. He led his team to the 3A State Championship as a sophomore.

Sessions played three seasons at Nevada between 2004 and 2007, earning career averages of 8.8 points, 4.9 assists and 4.2 rebounds. He ranks second in school history in assists (478) and ninth in steals (113). He set a school freshman record with 166 assists and was named to the WAC All-Newcomer Team. As a junior in 2006–07, he earned Second Team All-WAC honors and was a finalist for the Bob Cousy Award.

== Professional career ==
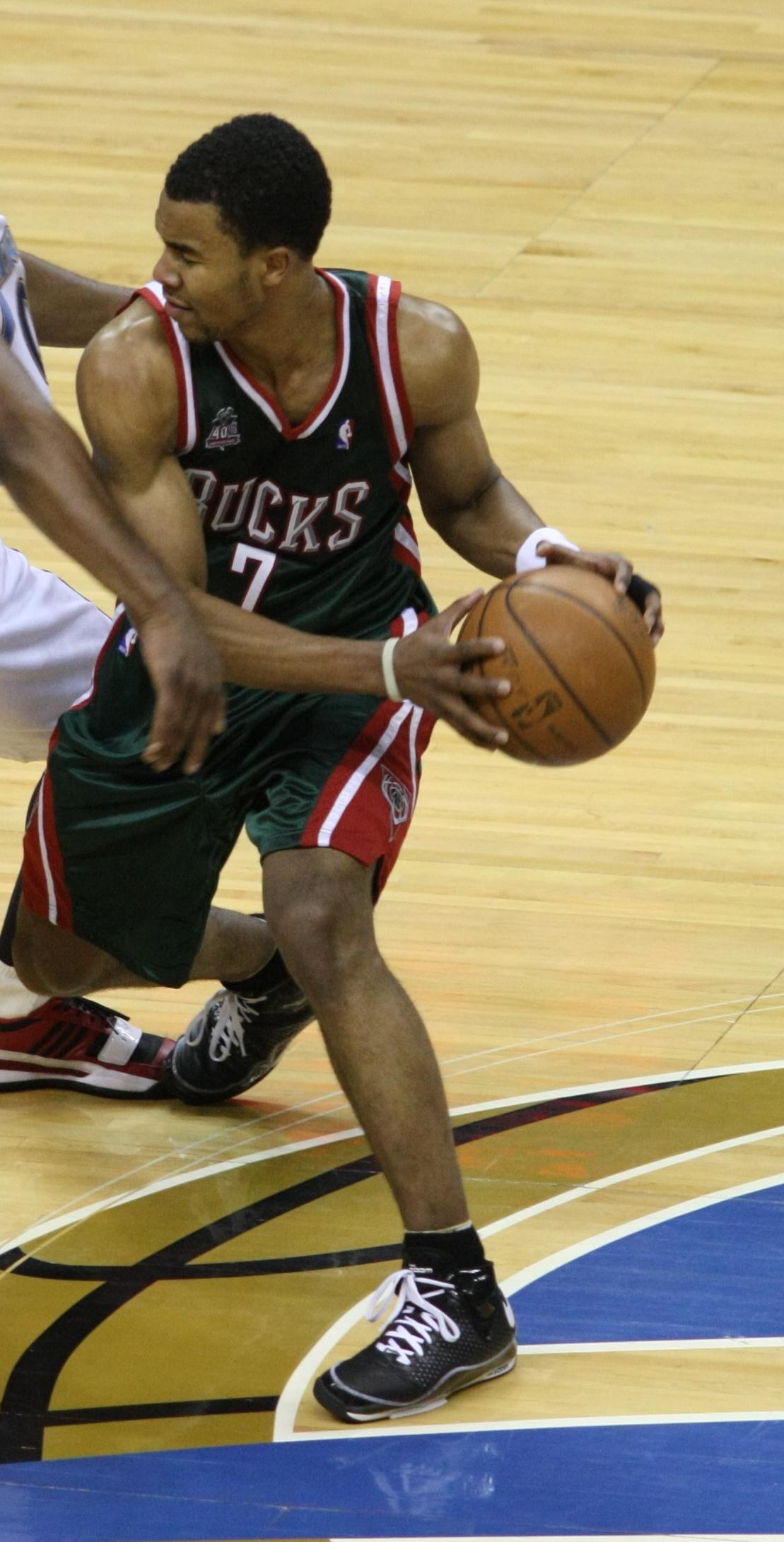
Sessions with the Milwaukee Bucks in 2009

=== Milwaukee Bucks (2007–2009) ===
On June 28, 2007, Sessions was selected by the Milwaukee Bucks with the 56th overall pick in the 2007 NBA draft. On November 8, 2007, he was assigned to the Tulsa 66ers of the NBA Development League. He earned two D-League Performer of the Week recognitions before being recalled by the Bucks on February 1, 2008. He missed games from February 2–23 due to a left hand fracture. He made his NBA debut on March 9, 2008, recording two points, two assists and one steal in just over four minutes off the bench in a 119–97 loss to the Philadelphia 76ers.

Sessions scored in double figures five times to finish the 2007–08 season, including two games of 20 points or more, and handed out double-figure assists six times, tallying three double-doubles. He scored 20 points and handed out a career-high and Bucks franchise record 24 assists on April 14 against the Chicago Bulls, becoming the first player in team history to record 20 points and 20 assists in the same game. His 24 assists was the third-highest single-game total by a rookie in NBA history. He went on to score a season-high 25 points with 14 assists on April 16 against the Minnesota Timberwolves. He handed out double-figure assists in five straight games to end the season and was subsequently named Eastern Conference Rookie of the Month for April.

In 2008–09, Sessions scored in double figures 53 times, including 12 games with 20 points or more and one game with 40 points or more. He handed out double-figure assists 10 times, grabbed double-figure rebounds once, tallied nine double-doubles, and had one triple-double. He scored a career-high 44 points and handed out 12 assists on February 7 against the Detroit Pistons, setting career highs of 13 field goals, 18 free throws and 21 free-throw attempts. Four days later, he had 15 points and a season-high 17 assists against the Indiana Pacers. He recorded his lone career triple-double with 16 points, 16 assists and a career-high 10 rebounds on April 1 against the Los Angeles Lakers. He led the Bucks in scoring nine times, in assists 43 times and in steals 20 times.

=== Minnesota Timberwolves (2009–2010) ===
After the 2008–09 season, Sessions became a restricted free agent. On September 4, 2009, he received a four-year, $16 million offer sheet from the Minnesota Timberwolves. The Bucks declined to match the offer and Sessions signed with the Timberwolves on September 14. In 2009–10, he appeared in all 82 games (one start) for the Timberwolves, averaging 8.2 points, 3.1 assists and 2.6 rebounds in 21.1 minutes. He scored in double figures 31 times, including two games with 20 points or more. He scored a season-high 23 points on November 27 against the Phoenix Suns.

=== Cleveland Cavaliers (2010–2012) ===
On July 26, 2010, Sessions was traded, along with Ryan Hollins and a future second-round draft pick, to the Cleveland Cavaliers in exchange for Delonte West and Sebastian Telfair.

In 2010–11, Sessions appeared in 81 games (38 starts) for the Cavaliers, averaging a career-high 13.3 points, 5.2 assists and 3.1 rebounds in 26.3 minutes. He scored a career-high 1,075 total points and set career highs in field goal percentage (.466) and free-throw percentage (.823). He recorded four games of 20 points or more and 10 assists or more, all of which came during the month of February, including a season-high 32 points off the bench on February 16 against the Los Angeles Lakers.

On February 8, 2012, Sessions recorded a season-high 24 points and 13 assists in the Cavaliers' 99–92 win over the Los Angeles Clippers. Two days later, he had a season-high 16 assists in a 113–112 loss to the Milwaukee Bucks.

=== Los Angeles Lakers (2012) ===
On March 15, 2012, Sessions was traded, along with Christian Eyenga, to the Los Angeles Lakers in exchange for Luke Walton, Jason Kapono, a protected 2012 first-round draft pick, and other considerations. On April 1, 2012, he had a season-best game as a Laker, scoring 23 points to go with nine assists in a 120–112 win over the Golden State Warriors. He played in 12 playoff games for the Lakers, averaging 9.7 points, 3.6 assists and 3.0 rebounds in 31.7 minutes.

=== Charlotte Bobcats (2012–2014) ===
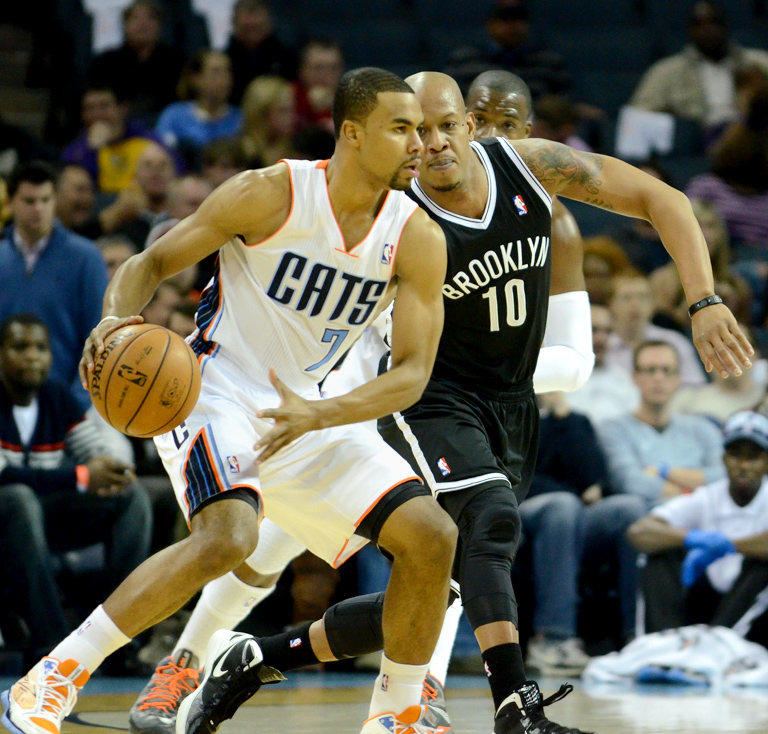
Sessions with the Bobcats in March 2013, being defended by Keith Bogans.

On July 13, 2012, Sessions signed with the Charlotte Bobcats. He appeared in 61 games for the Bobcats in 2012–13, averaging a career-high 14.4 points, 3.8 assists and 2.8 rebounds in 27.1 minutes. He ranked 11th in the NBA in fast break points, and scored in double figures in the first 12 games of the season, recording the second-longest double-figure scoring streak by a player to start his Bobcats career. He scored a season-high 27 points on January 23 against the Atlanta Hawks.

=== Second stint with Milwaukee (2014) ===
On February 20, 2014, Sessions was traded, along with Jeff Adrien, to the Milwaukee Bucks in exchange for Gary Neal and Luke Ridnour. On March 1 against the Brooklyn Nets, Sessions went a perfect 11-for-11 from the free throw line, marking the seventh time in his career he'd been perfect with 10+ free throw attempts. He made his first start for the Bucks on March 24 against the Los Angeles Clippers and scored a season-high 28 points (13 FGM tied career high) and grabbed a season-high six rebounds.

=== Sacramento Kings (2014–2015) ===
On September 22, 2014, Sessions signed with the Sacramento Kings.

=== Washington Wizards (2015–2016) ===
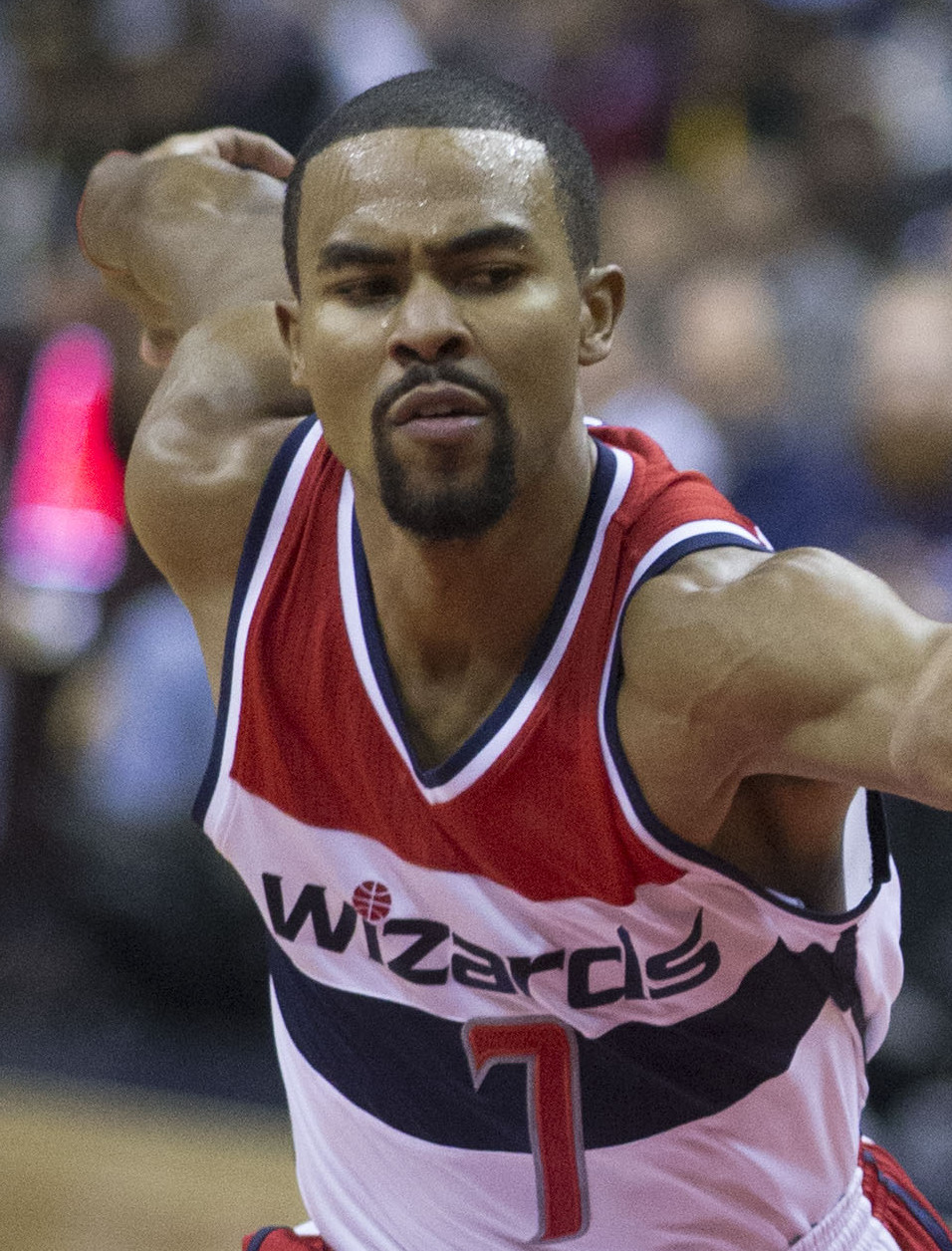
Sessions with the Wizards in March 2015

On February 19, 2015, Sessions was traded to the Washington Wizards in exchange for Andre Miller. In one and a half seasons, Sessions played behind John Wall, including starting in place for him in five games during the 2015–16 season. That year, Sessions played all 82 games and averaged 9.9 points and 2.9 assists.

=== Charlotte Hornets (2016–2017) ===
On July 7, 2016, Sessions signed with the Charlotte Hornets, returning to the franchise for a second stint. He appeared in the team's first 50 games of the season before missing the final 32 games with a left knee injury.

=== New York Knicks (2017–2018) ===
On August 8, 2017, Sessions signed with the New York Knicks. On January 13, 2018, he was waived by the Knicks.

=== Return to Washington (2018) ===
On February 23, 2018, Sessions signed a 10-day contract with the Washington Wizards, returning to the franchise for a second stint. He signed a second 10-day contract on March 5, and a rest-of-season contract on March 16.

=== Maccabi Tel Aviv (2018) ===
On November 3, 2018, Sessions joined the Israeli team Maccabi Tel Aviv of the EuroLeague, signing a three-month contract with an option to extend it for the rest of the season. However, on November 20, 2018, Sessions parted ways with Maccabi for personal reasons.

== Post-playing career ==
On October 6, 2019, The New Orleans Pelicans brought Sessions on to serve as part of the basketball operations team.

Sessions has become a certified agent and started an independently owned firm, On Time Agency (OTA).

Sessions is advising 5-star McDonald's All-American and Arkansas commit Jordan Walsh.

== NBA career statistics ==
Legend
GP	Games played	GS	Games started	MPG	Minutes per game
FG%	Field goal percentage	3P%	3-point field goal percentage	FT%	Free throw percentage
RPG	Rebounds per game	APG	Assists per game	SPG	Steals per game
BPG	Blocks per game	PPG	Points per game	**Bold**	Career high
*	Led the league

=== Regular season ===
Year	Team	GP	GS	MPG	FG%	3P%	FT%	RPG	APG	SPG	BPG	PPG
2007–08	Milwaukee	17	7	26.5	.436	.429	.780	3.4	**7.5**	**1.0**	**.2**	8.1
2008–09	Milwaukee	79	**38**	27.5	.445	.176	.794	3.4	5.7	**1.0**	.1	12.4
2009–10	Minnesota	82*	1	21.1	.456	.067	.717	2.6	3.1	.7	.1	8.2
2010–11	Cleveland	81	**38**	26.3	.466	.200	.823	3.1	5.2	.7	.1	13.3
2011–12	Cleveland	41	4	24.5	.398	.419	.830	3.1	5.2	.7	.0	10.5
2011–12	L.A. Lakers	23	19	30.5	**.479**	**.486**	.713	**3.8**	6.2	.7	.1	12.7
2012–13	Charlotte	61	0	27.1	.408	.308	.839	2.8	3.8	.8	.1	14.4
2013–14	Charlotte	**55***	7	23.7	.409	.221	.782	2.1	3.7	.6	.1	10.5
2013–14	Milwaukee	**28***	12	**32.5**	.461	.357	**.841**	3.1	4.8	.6	.1	**15.8**
2014–15	Sacramento	36	7	17.8	.344	.214	.727	1.9	2.7	.4	.0	5.4
2014–15	Washington	28	3	19.5	.411	.406	.812	2.7	3.1	.6	.0	7.4
2015–16	Washington	82*	5	20.3	.473	.324	.756	2.5	2.9	.6	.1	9.9
2016–17	Charlotte	50	1	16.2	.380	.339	.771	1.5	2.6	.5	.1	6.2
2017–18	New York	13	3	12.8	.321	.182	.800	1.4	2.1	.5	.1	3.7
2017–18	Washington	15	0	15.0	.391	.400	.762	1.3	3.3	.5	.1	5.9
Career		691	146	23.3	.434	.316	.791	2.7	4.1	.7	.1	10.3

=== Playoffs ===
Year	Team	GP	GS	MPG	FG%	3P%	FT%	RPG	APG	SPG	BPG	PPG
2012	L.A. Lakers	**12**	**12**	**31.7**	**.377**	.160	**.743**	**3.0**	**3.6**	.3	**.1**	**9.7**
2015	Washington	10	3	21.8	.371	**.400**	.684	2.4	2.3	**.4**	**.1**	7.5
Career		22	15	27.2	.375	.280	.722	2.7	3.0	.4	.1	8.7

== See also ==
- List of National Basketball Association players with most assists in a game
