= 2010–11 Cleveland Cavaliers season =

NBA professional basketball team season

- Head coach: Byron Scott
- General manager: Chris Grant
- Owner: Dan Gilbert
- Arena: Quicken Loans Arena

Results
- Record: 19–63 (.232)
- Place: Division: 5th (Central); Conference: 15th (Eastern)
- Playoff finish: Did not qualify
- Stats at Basketball Reference

Local media
- Television: Fox Sports Ohio; WUAB
- Radio: WTAM

The 2010–11 Cleveland Cavaliers season was the 41st season of the franchise in the National Basketball Association (NBA). They finished the regular season with 19 wins and 63 losses, the team's worst record since 2002–03. This was also their first season since then without LeBron James, who was not on the roster as he left the team in the offseason to join the Miami Heat. The team also updated their logo and uniforms with a new color scheme, particularly the original shades of wine and gold used from 1970 to 1983.

The offseason included James becoming a free agent and signing with the Heat alongside Zydrunas Ilgauskas. The Cavaliers also missed the playoffs for the first time since James' sophomore season in 2005, as well as posting a then-record 26 game losing streak spanning from December 20, 2010, to February 11, 2011, beginning the losing streak with a 90–101 loss to the Utah Jazz, but finally ending their losing streak with a 126–119 victory over the Los Angeles Clippers.

== Key dates ==
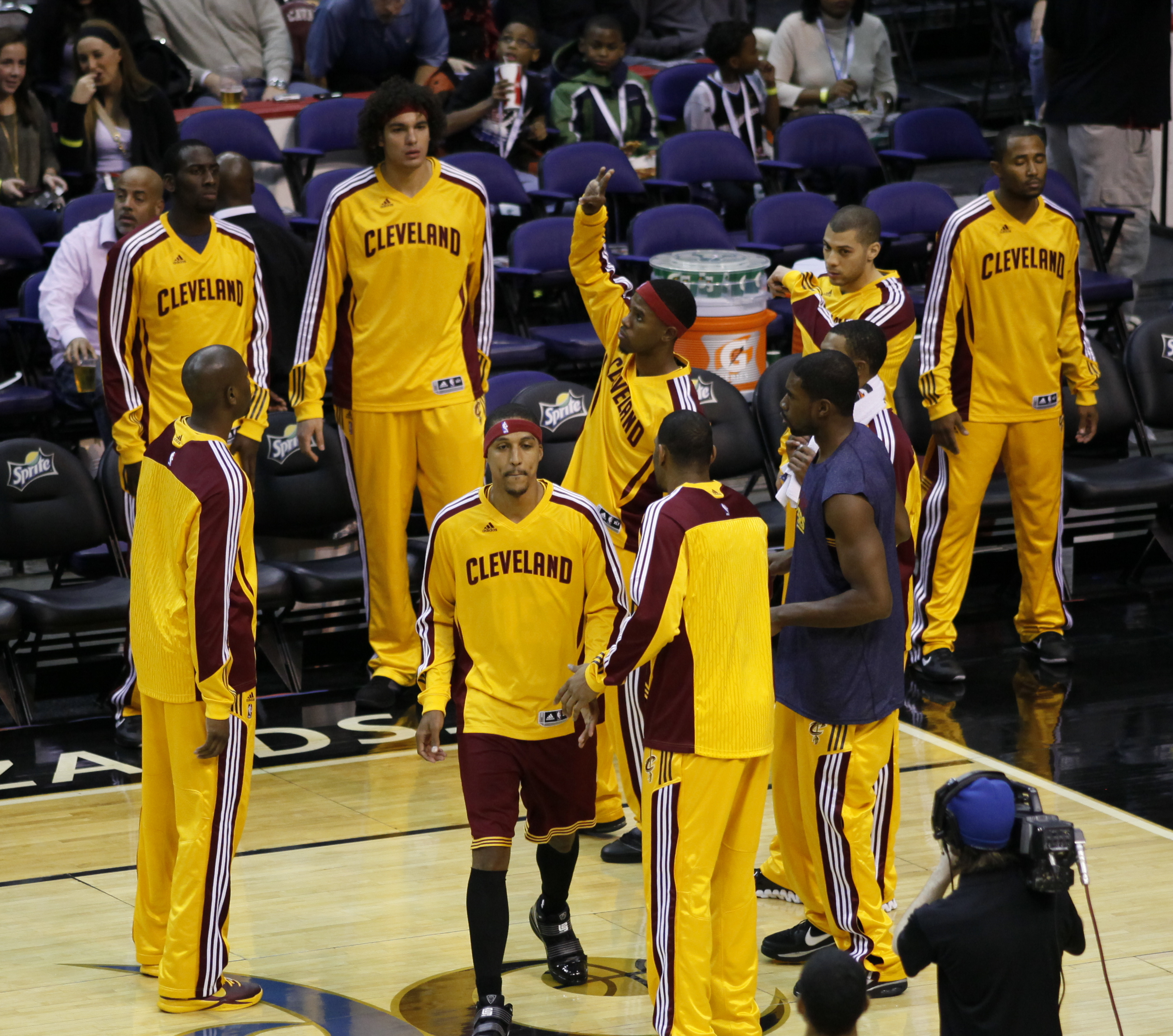
The Cavaliers being introduced at the Verizon Center on November 6, 2010.

- June 24 – The 2010 NBA draft was held in New York City.
- July 1 – The free agency period started.
- July 2 – Byron Scott hired as new head coach.
- July 8 – LeBron James announces that he will leave Cleveland and play for the Miami Heat.
- July 23 – The Cavaliers sign with the 2009 first-round pick, Christian Eyenga.
- July 26 – The Cavaliers traded Delonte West to the Boston Celtics and Sebastian Telfair to the Minnesota Timberwolves for Ramon Sessions, Ryan Hollins and a 2013 second round Draft pick.
- July 30 – The Cavs sign with the free agent Joey Graham.
- August 16 – The Cavaliers sign with the Jamaican undrafted rookie, Samardo Samuels.
- September 20 – Jawad Williams resigns with the Cavaliers.
- September 28 – The Training Camp begins.
- October 5 – The Cavaliers open the pre-season with a victory over the Charlotte Bobcats, in Quicken Loans Arena.
- October 19 – After the victory over the Philadelphia 76ers the Cavs waived Danny Green and Manny Harris made the season roster.
- October 21 – The Cavaliers close the pre-season with a victory over the Milwaukee Bucks and with a 6–2 record, in Schottenstein Center.
- October 27 – The Cavaliers open the regular reason with a victory over the Boston Celtics, in Quicken Loans Arena.
- November 18 – Christian Eyenga is sent to the Erie BayHawks, the Cavaliers' and Raptor's NBA D-League affiliate.
- December 27 – Jawad Williams is waived and Samardo Samuels is assigned to the NBA D-League.
- December 28 – The Cavaliers sign Alonzo Gee.
- January 1 – The Cavs recall Samardo Samuels, from the NBA D-League.
- January 2 – Eyenga is recalled from the Erie BayHawks.
- February 11 – The Cavaliers snap an NBA record 26 game losing streak with a 126–119 overtime victory against the Los Angeles Clippers.
- February 24 – The Cavs acquired the former All-Star Baron Davis and a 2011 First Round Draft Pick, from the L.A. Clippers, that received Mo Williams and Jamario Moon. The Cavs also sent a 2013 Second-Round Pick to the Boston Celtics, for Luke Harangody and Semih Erden. To clear the roster capacity, Leon Powe was waived.
- March 15 – The Indiana Pacers defeated the New York Knicks, and with this result, the Cavaliers are eliminated from the Playoffs.
- April 8 – Joe Tait is honored in the Quicken Loans Arena, and an honorary microphone banner is placed beside the other retired jerseys, on the rafters.
- April 13 – The Cavaliers finish the season, defeating the Washington Wizards, in The Q, and with a 19–63 record.

== Draft picks ==
The Cleveland Cavaliers had no picks in the 2010 NBA draft, along with Denver Nuggets and Charlotte Bobcats.

== Roster ==
2010–11 Cleveland Cavaliers roster
Players

| Pos. | No. | Player | Height | Weight | DOB | From |
|---|---|---|---|---|---|---|
| PG | 85 | Baron Davis | 6 ft 3 in (1.91 m) | 215 lb (98 kg) | 1979-04-13 | UCLA |
| C | 9 | Semih Erden | 6 ft 11 in (2.11 m) | 240 lb (109 kg) | 1986-07-28 | Turkey |
| SF | 8 | Christian Eyenga | 6 ft 5 in (1.96 m) | 210 lb (95 kg) | 1989-06-22 | DR Congo |
| SG | 33 | Alonzo Gee | 6 ft 6 in (1.98 m) | 220 lb (100 kg) | 1987-05-29 | Alabama |
| SG | 1 | Daniel Gibson | 6 ft 2 in (1.88 m) | 200 lb (91 kg) | 1986-02-27 | Texas |
| SF | 12 | Joey Graham | 6 ft 7 in (2.01 m) | 230 lb (104 kg) | 1982-06-11 | Oklahoma State |
| PF | 44 | Luke Harangody | 6 ft 8 in (2.03 m) | 251 lb (114 kg) | 1988-01-02 | Notre Dame |
| SG | 6 | Manny Harris | 6 ft 5 in (1.96 m) | 185 lb (84 kg) | 1989-09-21 | Michigan |
| C | 21 | J. J. Hickson | 6 ft 9 in (2.06 m) | 242 lb (110 kg) | 1988-09-04 | NC State |
| C | 5 | Ryan Hollins | 7 ft 0 in (2.13 m) | 240 lb (109 kg) | 1984-10-10 | UCLA |
| PF | 4 | Antawn Jamison | 6 ft 9 in (2.06 m) | 235 lb (107 kg) | 1976-06-12 | North Carolina |
| SF | 18 | Anthony Parker | 6 ft 6 in (1.98 m) | 215 lb (98 kg) | 1975-06-19 | Bradley |
| PF | 24 | Samardo Samuels | 6 ft 9 in (2.06 m) | 260 lb (118 kg) | 1989-01-09 | Louisville |
| PG | 3 | Ramon Sessions | 6 ft 3 in (1.91 m) | 190 lb (86 kg) | 1986-04-11 | Nevada |
| C | 17 | Anderson Varejão | 6 ft 11 in (2.11 m) | 260 lb (118 kg) | 1982-09-29 | Liga ACB |

Coaches
Head coach
- Byron Scott
Assistant(s)
- Chris Jent
- Jamahl Mosley
- Paul Pressey
- Joe Prunty

Legend
- (DP) Unsigned draft pick
- (FA) Free agent
- (S) Suspended
- Injured

Roster
Updated: February 24, 2011

== Pre-season ==
2010 Pre-season game log: 6–2 (Home: 4–2; Road: 2–0)
| Game | Date | Visitor | Score | Home | Decision | Attendance | Record | Recap |
| 1 | October 5 (in Quicken Loans Arena) | Charlotte Bobcats | 72 – 87 | Cleveland Cavaliers | Won | Not announced | 1-0 | 1 |
| 2 | October 7 (in Quicken Loans Arena) | Washington Wizards | 97 – 83 | Cleveland Cavaliers | Lost | 19,124 | 1-1 | 2 |
| 3 | October 10 (in Toyota Center) | Cleveland Cavaliers | 99 – 93 | Houston Rockets | Won | 11,095 | 2-1 | 3 |
| 4 | October 11 (in American Airlines Center) | Cleveland Cavaliers | 85 – 79 | Dallas Mavericks | Won | 16,673 | 3-1 | 4 |
| 5 | October 14 (in Petersen Events Center) | San Antonio Spurs | 80 – 106 | Cleveland Cavaliers | Won | 5,121 | 4-1 | 5 |
| 6 | October 16 (in Quicken Loans Arena) | CSKA Moscow (Russia) | 90 – 87 | Cleveland Cavaliers | Lost | 20,263 | 4-2 | 6 |
| 7 | October 19 (in U.S. Bank Arena) | Philadelphia 76ers | 95 – 111 | Cleveland Cavaliers | Won | 6,217 | 5-2 | 7 |
| 8 | October 21 (in Value City Arena) | Milwaukee Bucks | 77 – 83 | Cleveland Cavaliers | Won | 7,092 | 6-2 | 8 |

== Regular season ==
=== Standings ===
| Central Division | W | L | PCT | GB | Home | Road | Div |
|---|---|---|---|---|---|---|---|
| z-Chicago Bulls | 62 | 20 | .756 | – | 36–5 | 26–15 | 15–1 |
| x-Indiana Pacers | 37 | 45 | .451 | 25 | 24–17 | 13–28 | 9–7 |
| Milwaukee Bucks | 35 | 47 | .427 | 27 | 22–19 | 13–28 | 6–10 |
| Detroit Pistons | 30 | 52 | .366 | 32 | 21–20 | 9–32 | 7–9 |
| Cleveland Cavaliers | 19 | 63 | .232 | 43 | 12–29 | 7–34 | 3–13 |

| # | Eastern Conference | | | | |
| # | Team | W | L | PCT | GB |
|---|---|---|---|---|---|
| 1 | z-Chicago Bulls | 62 | 20 | .756 | – |
| 2 | y-Miami Heat | 58 | 24 | .707 | 4 |
| 3 | y-Boston Celtics | 56 | 26 | .683 | 6 |
| 4 | x-Orlando Magic | 52 | 30 | .634 | 10 |
| 5 | x-Atlanta Hawks | 44 | 38 | .537 | 18 |
| 6 | x-New York Knicks | 42 | 40 | .512 | 20 |
| 7 | x-Philadelphia 76ers | 41 | 41 | .500 | 21 |
| 8 | x-Indiana Pacers | 37 | 45 | .451 | 25 |
| 9 | Milwaukee Bucks | 35 | 47 | .427 | 27 |
| 10 | Charlotte Bobcats | 34 | 48 | .415 | 28 |
| 11 | Detroit Pistons | 30 | 52 | .366 | 32 |
| 12 | New Jersey Nets | 24 | 58 | .293 | 38 |
| 13 | Washington Wizards | 23 | 59 | .280 | 39 |
| 14 | Toronto Raptors | 22 | 60 | .268 | 40 |
| 15 | Cleveland Cavaliers | 19 | 63 | .232 | 43 |

=== Game log ===
2010–11 game log
Total: 19–63 (Home: 12–29; Road: 7–34)
October: 1–2 (home: 1–1; road: 0–1)

| Game | Date | Team | Score | High points | High rebounds | High assists | Location Attendance | Record |
|---|---|---|---|---|---|---|---|---|
| 1 | October 27 | Boston Celtics | W 95–87 | J. J. Hickson (21) | Anderson Varejão (10) | Daniel Gibson (8) | Quicken Loans Arena; 20,562 | 1–0 |
| 2 | October 29 | @ Toronto Raptors | L 81–101 | Antawn Jamison (13) | Jamario Moon, J. J. Hickson (6) | Ramon Sessions (4) | Air Canada Centre; 15,711 | 1–1 |
| 3 | October 30 | Sacramento Kings | L 104–107 | Ramon Sessions (21) | Anderson Varejão (9) | Daniel Gibson (7) | Quicken Loans Arena; 20,562 | 1–2 |

November: 6–8 (home: 3–4; road: 3–4)

| Game | Date | Team | Score | High points | High rebounds | High assists | Location Attendance | Record |
|---|---|---|---|---|---|---|---|---|
| 4 | November 2, 2010 | Atlanta | L 88–100 | J. J. Hickson (31) | Anderson Varejão (12) | Anderson Varejão, Ramon Sessions (3) | Quicken Loans Arena; 20,562 | 1–3 |
| 5 | November 5 | @ Philadelphia 76ers | W 123–116 | Anderson Varejão (23) | Anderson Varejão (12) | Mo Williams (7) | Wells Fargo Center; 10,589 | 2–3 |
| 6 | November 6 | @ Washington Wizards | W 107–102 | Mo Williams (28) | Anderson Varejão (11) | Jamario Moon (5) | Verizon Center; 14,442 | 3–3 |
| 7 | November 9 | @ New Jersey Nets | W 93–91 | J. J. Hickson (18) | J. J. Hickson (10) | Mo Williams (7) | Prudential Center; 10,188 | 4–3 |
| 8 | November 10 | New Jersey Nets | L 87–95 | J. J. Hickson (15) | Antawn Jamison (9) | Anthony Parker, Daniel Gibson (5) | Quicken Loans Arena; 20,562 | 4–4 |
| 9 | November 13 | Indiana Pacers | L 85–99 | Antawn Jamison (19) | Antawn Jamison (9) | Ramon Sessions (5) | Quicken Loans Arena; 20,562 | 4–5 |
| 10 | November 16 | Philadelphia 76ers | W 101–93 | Daniel Gibson (18) | Jamario Moon (8) | Ramon Sessions, Daniel Gibson (8) | Quicken Loans Arena; 20,562 | 5–5 |
| 11 | November 19 | @ New Orleans Hornets | L 101–108 | Antawn Jamison (20) | Anderson Varejão (13) | Ramon Sessions (5) | New Orleans Arena; 14,755 | 5–6 |
| 12 | November 20 | @ San Antonio Spurs | L 92–116 | Mo Williams (21) | Anderson Varejão (9) | Mo Williams (6) | AT&T Center; 16,982 | 5–7 |
| 13 | November 23 | @ Indiana Pacers | L 89–100 | Daniel Gibson, Ramon Sessions (15) | Anderson Varejão, Antawn Jamison (10) | Ramon Sessions (5) | Conseco Fieldhouse; 12,629 | 5–8 |
| 14 | November 24 | Milwaukee Bucks | W 83–81 | Mo Williams (25) | Anderson Varejão (13) | Mo Williams, Ramon Sessions (5) | Quicken Loans Arena; 20,562 | 6–8 |
| 15 | November 26 | @ Orlando Magic | L 100–111 | Antawn Jamison (22) | Antawn Jamison (7) | Mo Williams (8) | Amway Center; 18,846 | 6–9 |
| 16 | November 27 | Memphis Grizzlies | W 92–86 | Mo Williams (25) | Anderson Varejão (11) | Mo Williams (12) | Quicken Loans Arena; 20,562 | 7–9 |
| 17 | November 30 | Boston Celtics | L 87–106 | Anderson Varejão, Daniel Gibson (16) | Anderson Varejão (12) | Mo Williams, Ramon Sessions (4) | Quicken Loans Arena; 20,562 | 7–10 |

December: 1–14 (home: 1–5; road: 0–9)

| Game | Date | Team | Score | High points | High rebounds | High assists | Location Attendance | Record |
|---|---|---|---|---|---|---|---|---|
| 18 | December 2 | Miami Heat | L 90–118 | Daniel Gibson (21) | Anderson Varejão (8) | Mo Williams (4) | Quicken Loans Arena; 20,562 | 7–11 |
| 19 | December 4 | @ Minnesota Timberwolves | L 95–129 | Ramon Sessions (18) | Leon Powe, Jawad Williams (6) | Ramon Sessions (6) | Target Center; 14,422 | 7–12 |
| 20 | December 5 | @ Detroit Pistons | L 92–102 | Antawn Jamison (22) | Anderson Varejão (14) | Mo Williams (10) | The Palace of Auburn Hills; 13,081 | 7–13 |
| 21 | December 7 | @ Philadelphia 76ers | L 97–117 | J. J. Hickson (18) | Anderson Varejão (8) | Mo Williams (7) | Wells Fargo Center; 10,662 | 7–14 |
| 22 | December 8 | Chicago Bulls | L 83–88 | Antawn Jamison (21) | Anderson Varejão (12) | Mo Williams (10) | Quicken Loans Arena; 20,562 | 7–15 |
| 23 | December 11 | @ Houston Rockets | L 95–110 | Antawn Jamison (24) | Anderson Varejão (8) | Mo Williams (9) | Toyota Center; 15,532 | 7–16 |
| 24 | December 12 | @ Oklahoma City Thunder | L 77–106 | Anthony Parker (12) | Anderson Varejão (16) | Mo Williams (4) | Oklahoma City Arena; 18,203 | 7–17 |
| 25 | December 15 | @ Miami Heat | L 95–101 | Daniel Gibson (26) | Anderson Varejão (15) | Mo Williams (9) | American Airlines Arena; 19,899 | 7–18 |
| 26 | December 17 | @ Indiana Pacers | L 99–108 | Mo Williams (22) | Antawn Jamison (7) | Mo Williams (11) | Conseco Fieldhouse; 12,021 | 7–19 |
| 27 | December 18 | New York Knicks | W 109–102 (OT) | Mo Williams (23) | Anderson Varejão (17) | Mo Williams (14) | Quicken Loans Arena; 20,562 | 8–19 |
| 28 | December 20 | Utah Jazz | L 90–101 | Daniel Gibson (29) | J. J. Hickson (9) | Mo Williams (10) | Quicken Loans Arena; 20,562 | 8–20 |
| 29 | December 22, 2010 | @ Atlanta | L 84–98 | Antawn Jamison (23) | Anderson Varejão (13) | Mo Williams (11) | Philips Arena; 12,610 | 8–21 |
| 30 | December 26 | Minnesota Timberwolves | L 97–98 | Antawn Jamison (24) | Anderson Varejão (12) | Mo Williams (11) | Quicken Loans Arena; 20,562 | 8–22 |
| 31 | December 28 | Orlando Magic | L 95–110 | Antawn Jamison (21) | Anderson Varejão (9) | Mo Williams (8) | Quicken Loans Arena; 20,562 | 8–23 |
| 32 | December 29 | @ Charlotte Bobcats | L 92–101 | Ramon Sessions (22) | Anderson Varejão (10) | Anthony Parker (6) | Time Warner Cable Arena; 15,287 | 8–24 |

January: 0–16 (home: 0–5; road: 0–11)

| Game | Date | Team | Score | High points | High rebounds | High assists | Location Attendance | Record |
|---|---|---|---|---|---|---|---|---|
| 33 | January 1 | @ Chicago Bulls | L 91–100 | J. J. Hickson (21) | Antawn Jamison (9) | Anthony Parker (8) | United Center; 21,416 | 8–25 |
| 34 | January 2 | Dallas Mavericks | L 95–104 | Antawn Jamison (35) | Antawn Jamison (10) | Ramon Sessions (12) | Quicken Loans Arena; 20,562 | 8–26 |
| 35 | January 5 | Toronto Raptors | L 105–120 | Antawn Jamison (32) | Anderson Varejão (8) | Mo Williams (9) | Quicken Loans Arena; 20,562 | 8–27 |
| 36 | January 7 | @ Golden State Warriors | L 98–116 | Antawn Jamison (21) | Manny Harris (10) | Mo Williams (7) | Oracle Arena; 18,858 | 8–28 |
| 37 | January 9 | @ Phoenix Suns | L 100–108 | Manny Harris (27) | J. J. Hickson (17) | Mo Williams (12) | US Airways Center; 17,031 | 8–29 |
| 38 | January 11 | @ L.A. Lakers | L 57–112 | Alonzo Gee (12) | Alonzo Gee, Antawn Jamison (8) | Ramon Sessions (4) | Staples Center; 18,997 | 8–30 |
| 39 | January 14 | @ Utah Jazz | L 99–121 | Antawn Jamison (26) | J. J. Hickson (14) | Mo Williams (10) | EnergySolutions Arena; 19,911 | 8–31 |
| 40 | January 15 | @ Denver Nuggets | L 99–127 | Ramon Sessions (21) | J. J. Hickson (9) | Ramon Sessions (9) | Pepsi Center; 17,668 | 8–32 |
| 41 | January 19 | Phoenix Suns | L 98–106 | Antawn Jamison (23) | J. J. Hickson (15) | Ramon Sessions (8) | Quicken Loans Arena; 20,562 | 8–33 |
| 42 | January 21 | Milwaukee Bucks | L 88–102 | Antawn Jamison, Ramon Sessions (22) | Samardo Samuels (6) | Daniel Gibson (8) | Quicken Loans Arena; 20,562 | 8–34 |
| 43 | January 22 | @ Chicago Bulls | L 79–92 | Antawn Jamison (31) | J. J. Hickson (20) | Daniel Gibson, Antawn Jamison (5) | United Center; 21,389 | 8–35 |
| 44 | January 24 | @ New Jersey Nets | L 101–103 | Antawn Jamison (26) | Antawn Jamison, J. J. Hickson (8) | Ramon Sessions (6) | Prudential Center; 10,197 | 8–36 |
| 45 | January 25 | @ Boston Celtics | L 95–112 | Christian Eyenga (15) | J. J. Hickson (17) | Ramon Sessions (7) | TD Garden; 18,624 | 8–37 |
| 46 | January 28 | Denver Nuggets | L 103–117 | J. J. Hickson (24) | J. J. Hickson (14) | Ramon Sessions (13) | Quicken Loans Arena; 19,642 | 8–38 |
| 47 | January 30 | @ Orlando Magic | L 87–103 | Manny Harris (20) | J. J. Hickson (11) | Anthony Parker (6) | Amway Center; 18,846 | 8–39 |
| 48 | January 31 | @ Miami Heat | L 90–117 | Antawn Jamison (21) | Antawn Jamison (10) | Ramon Sessions (7) | American Airlines Arena; 19,600 | 8–40 |

February: 3–8 (home: 3–6; road: 0–2)

| Game | Date | Team | Score | High points | High rebounds | High assists | Location Attendance | Record |
|---|---|---|---|---|---|---|---|---|
| 49 | February 2 | Indiana Pacers | L 112–117 | Ramon Sessions (25) | Manny Harris (8) | Ramon Sessions (9) | Quicken Loans Arena; 18,877 | 8–41 |
| 50 | February 4 | @ Memphis Grizzlies | L 105–112 | J. J. Hickson (31) | J. J. Hickson (15) | Ramon Sessions (11) | FedExForum; 11,932 | 8–42 |
| 51 | February 5 | Portland Trail Blazers | L 105–111 | Antawn Jamison (17) | Christian Eyenga, J. J. Hickson, Ramon Sessions (6) | Daniel Gibson (9) | Quicken Loans Arena; 19,975 | 8–43 |
| 52 | February 7 | @ Dallas Mavericks | L 96–99 | J. J. Hickson (26) | J. J. Hickson (12) | Ramon Sessions (13) | American Airlines Center; 19,875 | 8–44 |
| 53 | February 9 | Detroit Pistons | L 94–103 | Antawn Jamison (22) | J. J. Hickson (15) | Ramon Sessions (12) | Quicken Loans Arena; 19,475 | 8–45 |
| 54 | February 11 | L.A. Clippers | W 126–119 (OT) | Antawn Jamison (35) | J. J. Hickson (14) | Mo Williams (14) | Quicken Loans Arena; 20,562 | 9–45 |
| 55 | February 13 | Washington Wizards | L 100–115 | Antawn Jamison (21) | J. J. Hickson (13) | Mo Williams (8) | Quicken Loans Arena; 20,562 | 9–46 |
| 56 | February 16 | L.A. Lakers | W 104–99 | Ramon Sessions (32) | J. J. Hickson (15) | Anthony Parker (9) | Quicken Loans Arena; 20,562 | 10–46 |
All-Star Break
| 57 | February 23 | Houston Rockets | L 119–124 | Antawn Jamison (26) | Manny Harris (9) | Ramon Sessions (12) | Quicken Loans Arena; 18,027 | 10–47 |
| 58 | February 25 | New York Knicks | W 115–109 | Antawn Jamison (28) | J. J. Hickson (15) | Daniel Gibson, Anthony Parker, Ramon Sessions (4) | Quicken Loans Arena; 20,562 | 11–47 |
| 59 | February 27 | Philadelphia 76ers | L 91–95 | J. J. Hickson (22) | J. J. Hickson (16) | Ramon Sessions (10) | Quicken Loans Arena; 19,882 | 11–48 |

March: 4–11 (home: 2–7; road: 2–4)

| Game | Date | Team | Score | High points | High rebounds | High assists | Location Attendance | Record |
|---|---|---|---|---|---|---|---|---|
| 60 | March 2 | San Antonio Spurs | L 99–109 | Samardo Samuels (23) | Samardo Samuels (10) | Ramon Sessions (7) | Quicken Loans Arena; 18,795 | 11–49 |
| 61 | March 4 | @ New York Knicks | W 119–115 | J. J. Hickson (23) | J. J. Hickson (8) | Anthony Parker (7) | Madison Square Garden; 19,763 | 12–49 |
| 62 | March 6 | New Orleans Hornets | L 81–96 | Baron Davis (17) | J. J. Hickson (10) | Baron Davis (6) | Quicken Loans Arena; 18,754 | 12–50 |
| 63 | March 8 | Golden State Warriors | L 85–95 | Baron Davis (19) | Samardo Samuels (9) | Baron Davis (6) | Quicken Loans Arena; 19,919 | 12–51 |
| 64 | March 9 | @ Milwaukee Bucks | L 90–110 | Samardo Samuels (15) | J. J. Hickson (8) | Daniel Gibson (7) | Bradley Center; 12,497 | 12–52 |
| 65 | March 13 | Oklahoma City Thunder | L 75–95 | Daniel Gibson (13) | J. J. Hickson (15) | Ramon Sessions (5) | Quicken Loans Arena; 19,811 | 12–53 |
| 66 | March 16 | @ Sacramento Kings | W 97–93 | Ramon Sessions (20) | Luke Harangody, J. J. Hickson (8) | Ramon Sessions (6) | Power Balance Pavilion; 13,477 | 13–53 |
| 67 | March 17 | @ Portland Trail Blazers | L 70–111 | Ramon Sessions (14) | J. J. Hickson (7) | Manny Harris (3) | Rose Garden; 20,235 | 13–54 |
| 68 | March 19 | @ L.A. Clippers | L 92–100 | J. J. Hickson (28) | J. J. Hickson (9) | Ramon Sessions (7) | Staples Center; 19,060 | 13–55 |
| 69 | March 21 | Orlando Magic | L 86–97 | J. J. Hickson (18) | J. J. Hickson, Ryan Hollins, Ramon Sessions (6) | Daniel Gibson, Ramon Sessions (6) | Quicken Loans Arena; 19,343 | 13–56 |
| 70 | March 23 | New Jersey Nets | L 94–98 (OT) | Ramon Sessions (21) | J. J. Hickson (17) | Anthony Parker (4) | Quicken Loans Arena; 18,923 | 13–57 |
| 71 | March 25 | Detroit Pistons | W 97–91 | J. J. Hickson (24) | J. J. Hickson (15) | Anthony Parker (7) | Quicken Loans Arena; 19,907 | 14–57 |
| 72 | March 27 | Atlanta | L 83–99 | Baron Davis (19) | J. J. Hickson (13) | Baron Davis (7) | Quicken Loans Arena; 20,226 | 14–58 |
| 73 | March 29 | Miami Heat | W 102–90 | J. J. Hickson (21) | J. J. Hickson (12) | Baron Davis (7) | Quicken Loans Arena; 20,562 | 15–58 |
| 74 | March 30 | @ Charlotte Bobcats | L 97–98 | Ramon Sessions (24) | J. J. Hickson (7) | Baron Davis (6) | Time Warner Cable Arena; 12,584 | 15–59 |

April: 4–4 (home: 2–1; road: 2–3)

| Game | Date | Team | Score | High points | High rebounds | High assists | Location Attendance | Record |
|---|---|---|---|---|---|---|---|---|
| 75 | April 1 | @ Washington Wizards | L 107–115 | Ramon Sessions (26) | J. J. Hickson (10) | Baron Davis (11) | Verizon Center; 17,427 | 15–60 |
| 76 | April 3 | @ New York Knicks | L 107–123 | J. J. Hickson (23) | Samardo Samuels (9) | Ramon Sessions (8) | Madison Square Garden; 19,763 | 15–61 |
| 77 | April 5 | Charlotte Bobcats | W 99–89 | Ramon Sessions (18) | J. J. Hickson (19) | Baron Davis, Daniel Gibson, Anthony Parker (5) | Quicken Loans Arena; 19,835 | 16–61 |
| 78 | April 6 | @ Toronto Raptors | W 104–96 | J. J. Hickson (28) | Luke Harangody, J. J. Hickson (10) | Baron Davis (12) | Air Canada Centre; 14,886 | 17–61 |
| 79 | April 8 | Chicago Bulls | L 82–93 | J. J. Hickson (22) | J. J. Hickson (15) | Baron Davis (6) | Quicken Loans Arena; 20,562 | 17–62 |
| 80 | April 9 | @ Milwaukee Bucks | L 101–108 | Baron Davis (19) | J. J. Hickson (12) | Baron Davis (6) | Bradley Center; 18,717 | 17–63 |
| 81 | April 11 | @ Detroit Pistons | W 110–101 | J. J. Hickson (20) | J. J. Hickson (11) | Ramon Sessions (9) | The Palace of Auburn Hills; 15,589 | 18–63 |
| 82 | April 13 | Washington Wizards | W 100–93 | Ramon Sessions (27) | J. J. Hickson (13) | Manny Harris (5) | Quicken Loans Arena; 20,562 | 19–63 |

2010–11 season schedule

== Playoffs ==
=== Game log ===
The Cleveland Cavaliers did not qualify for the 2011 NBA Playoffs.

== Player statistics ==
Legend
| GP | Games played | GS | Games started | MPG | Minutes per game |
| FG% | Field-goal percentage | 3P% | 3-point field-goal percentage | FT% | Free-throw percentage |
| RPG | Rebounds per game | APG | Assists per game | SPG | Steals per game |
| BPG | Blocks per game | PPG | Points per game |

=== Regular season ===
| Player | GP | GS | MPG | FG% | 3P% | FT% | RPG | APG | SPG | BPG | PPG |
|---|---|---|---|---|---|---|---|---|---|---|---|
| Baron Davis^{1} | 15 | 9 | 25.3 | .421 | .414 | .815 | 2.4 | 6.1 | 1.1 | .4 | 13.9 |
| Semih Erden^{1} | 4 | 1 | 16.0 | .286 | .000 | .833 | 2.8 | .3 | .5 | .8 | 3.3 |
| Christian Eyenga | 44 | 18 | 21.5 | .425 | .275 | .643 | 2.8 | .8 | .8 | .6 | 6.9 |
| Alonzo Gee^{1} | 40 | 29 | 24.3 | .462 | .347 | .800 | 3.9 | .8 | .8 | .4 | 7.4 |
| Daniel Gibson | 67 | 15 | 27.8 | .400 | .403 | .822 | 2.6 | 3.0 | .7 | .3 | 11.6 |
| Joey Graham | 39 | 8 | 15.0 | .458 | .300 | .806 | 2.2 | .5 | .2 | .2 | 5.2 |
| Luke Harangody^{1} | 21 | 0 | 19.0 | .378 | .250 | .778 | 4.2 | 1.0 | .5 | .5 | 6.2 |
| Manny Harris | 54 | 15 | 17.3 | .374 | .370 | .763 | 2.6 | 1.6 | .6 | .1 | 5.9 |
| J.J. Hickson | 80 | 66 | 28.2 | .458 | .000 | .673 | 8.7 | 1.1 | .6 | .7 | 13.8 |
| Ryan Hollins | 70 | 16 | 16.9 | .598 | .000 | .681 | 2.7 | .4 | .3 | .6 | 5.3 |
| Antawn Jamison | 56 | 38 | 32.9 | .427 | .346 | .731 | 6.7 | 1.7 | .9 | .5 | 18.0 |
| Jamario Moon^{1} | 40 | 13 | 19.1 | .402 | .284 | .909 | 3.0 | 1.1 | .6 | .7 | 4.7 |
| Anthony Parker | 72 | 65 | 29.0 | .399 | .379 | .779 | 3.0 | 3.0 | .9 | .1 | 8.3 |
| Leon Powe^{1} | 14 | 3 | 13.4 | .492 | .000 | .462 | 2.7 | .1 | .5 | .2 | 5.0 |
| Samardo Samuels | 37 | 10 | 18.9 | .456 | .000 | .618 | 4.3 | .5 | .4 | .5 | 7.8 |
| Ramon Sessions | 81 | 38 | 26.3 | .466 | .200 | .823 | 3.1 | 5.2 | .7 | .1 | 13.3 |
| Anderson Varejão | 31 | 31 | 32.1 | .528 | .000 | .667 | 9.7 | 1.5 | .9 | 1.2 | 9.1 |
| Jawad Williams | 26 | 1 | 15.0 | .325 | .289 | .750 | 1.8 | .8 | .3 | .1 | 4.0 |
| Mo Williams^{1} | 36 | 34 | 29.6 | .385 | .265 | .833 | 2.7 | 7.1 | .9 | .3 | 13.3 |

Stats with the Cavaliers.
^{1} Did not start or finish the season with the Cavs.

== Awards, Records and Milestones ==
=== Awards ===
No awards.

==== Week/Month ====
No awards.

==== All-Star ====
- Daniel Gibson - 3-PT Shootout (5th)

=== Records ===
- At the end of the season, Baron Davis had 5,890 career assists, and he became the 31st player with more assists in the NBA.
- At the end of the season, Baron Davis had 1,496 career steals, and he became the 37th player with more steals in the NBA.

=== Team Records ===
- On January 11, the Cavaliers set franchise records for fewest points in a game (57) and largest margin of defeat (55) against the Los Angeles Lakers.
- On January 15, the Cavaliers set a franchise record for most points given up in a half (80) against the Denver Nuggets.
- The Cavaliers had their first winless month (with at least 12 games) in franchise history, going 0–16 in January.
- On February 11, the Cavaliers snapped the NBA record for longest losing streak. After 26 consecutive losses, they defeated the Los Angeles Clippers.
- On March 4, the Cavs snapped their franchise record for most consecutive losses on the road, against the New York Knicks, at 26.

=== Milestones ===
- Baron Davis reached 800 career games.
- Semih Erden played his first season in the NBA.
- Christian Eyenga played his first season in the NBA.*
- Alonzo Gee reached 1,000 minutes played.
- Daniel Gibson reached 300 career games, 7,000 minutes, 2,000 field goals attempted, 1,000 three-point shots attempted and 2,000 points.*
- Joey Graham reached 6,000 minutes played.
- Luke Harangody played his first season in the NBA.
- Manny Harris played his first season in the NBA.*
- J.J. Hickson reached 400 career games, 4,000 minutes, 1,000 field goals attempted, 1,000 rebounds and 2,000 points.*
- Ryan Hollins reached 3,000 minutes played and 1,000 points.
- Antawn Jamison reached 900 career games, 33,000 minutes played, 15,000 field goals attempted, 5,000 defensive rebounds, 7,000 rebounds and 18,000 points.
- Jamario Moon reached 6,000 minutes played.
- Anthony Parker reached 400 career games, 12,000 minutes, 3,000 field goals attempted, 1,000 assists and 4,000 points.
- Leon Powe reached 3,000 minutes played.
- Samardo Samuels played his first season in the NBA.*
- Ramon Sessions reached 200 career games, 6,000 minutes, 1,000 field goals made, 2,000 field goals attempted, 1,000 free throws attempted, 1,000 assists and 2,000 points.
- Anderson Varejão reached 400 career games and 10,000 minutes.*
- Jawad Williams reached 1,000 minutes played.*
- Mo Williams reached 500 career games, 15,000 minutes, 6,000 field goals attempted, 1,000 free throws made and 7,000 points.

*Spent the entire NBA Career with the Cleveland Cavaliers, until reach these Milestones.

=== Team milestones ===
- On November 2, the Cavaliers reached 3,400 combined regular and post-season games, against the Atlanta Hawks.
- On February 8, the Cavaliers reached 3,300 regular season games, against the Dallas Mavericks.
- On February 11, the Cavaliers reached 1,600 regular and post-season victories, against the Los Angeles Clippers.

== Injuries, surgeries and absences ==
- Mo Williams - Personal Reasons (October 27 - November 2)
- Anderson Varejão - Personal Reasons (October 29 - October 30)
- Antawn Jamison - Sore Left Knee (November 2 - November 9)
- Anderson Varejão - Right Rib Contusion (November 13 - November 16)
- Mo Williams - Left Adductor (Groin) Strain (November 13 - November 19)
- Joey Graham - Right Quad Strain (December 15 - January 21)
- Anthony Parker - Low Back Strain (January 2 - January 21 - January 25)
- Daniel Gibson - Left Ankle Sprain (January 5 - January 19)
- Leon Powe - Right Knee Torn Meniscus (January 5 - February 24 (Waived))
- Anderson Varejão - Torn Peroneus Longus Tendon in Right Ankle/Foot (January 7 - April 13 (Season finished))
- Christian Eyenga - Right Ankle Sprain (January 11 - January 21)
- Mo Williams - Left Hip Flexor Strain (January 15 - February 11)
- Daniel Gibson - Left Quad Injury (January 31 - February 5)
- Baron Davis - Sore Left Knee (March 2 - March 4)
- Semih Erden - Left/Right Adductor Strain (March 2 - March 6 - April 8)
- Daniel Gibson - Left Quad Contusion (March 2 - March 8)
- Antawn Jamison - Left Little Finger Fracture (March 2 - April 13 (Season finished))
- Luke Harangody - Right Hip Pointer (March 8 - March 13)
- Baron Davis - Personal Reasons/Back Spasms (March 9 - March 17 - March 25)
- Samardo Samuels - Right Wrist Sprain (March 29 - April 3)
- Samardo Samuels - Left Groin Strain (April 5 - April 13 (Season finished))
- Anthony Parker - Back Spasms (April 11 - April 13)
- Baron Davis - Back (April 13 (Season finished))
- Semih Erden - Sore Right Heel (April 13 (Season finished))

== Transactions ==
=== Free agents ===
==== Additions ====
| Date | Player | Signed | Former team |
|---|---|---|---|
| July 30, 2010 | Joey Graham | Free agent | Denver Nuggets |
| August 17, 2010 | Samardo Samuels | Undrafted rookie | Louisville Cardinals |
| October 19, 2010 | Manny Harris | Undrafted rookie | Michigan Wolverines |
| December 28, 2010 | Alonzo Gee | Free agent | Washington Wizards |

==== Subtractions ====
| Date | Player | Reason left | New team |
|---|---|---|---|
| July 9, 2010 | LeBron James | Free agent/Sign-and-trade | Miami Heat |
| July 17, 2010 | Žydrūnas Ilgauskas | Free agent | Miami Heat |
| August 4, 2010 | Shaquille O'Neal | Free agent | Boston Celtics |
| October 19, 2010 | Danny Green | Waived | San Antonio Spurs |
| December 27, 2010 | Jawad Williams | Waived | (Israel) Hapoel Jerusalem B.C. |
| February 24, 2011 | Leon Powe | Waived/Buyout | Memphis Grizzlies |

=== Trades ===
July 9, 2010
To Cleveland Cavaliers----
- 2011 second-round pick (Milan Macvan)
- 2012 second-round pick (Jae Crowder)
- 2013 first-round pick (Nemanja Nedovic)
- 2015 first-round pick (Timothé Luwawu-Cabarrot)
- Trade exception
To Miami Heat----
- (United States) LeBron James (sign and trade)
July 26, 2010
To Cleveland Cavaliers----
- (United States) Ramon Sessions
- (United States) Ryan Hollins
- 2013 second-round pick (Jeff Withey)
To Minnesota Timberwolves----
- (United States) Delonte West
- (United States) Sebastian Telfair
February 24, 2011
To Cleveland Cavaliers----
- (United States) Baron Davis
- 2011 first-round pick (Kyrie Irving)
To Los Angeles Clippers----
- (United States) Mo Williams
- (United States) Jamario Moon
February 24, 2011
To Cleveland Cavaliers----
- (Turkey) Semih Erden
- (United States) Luke Harangody
To Boston Celtics----
- 2013 Second-Round Pick (Jeff Withey)
