= Christian Eyenga =

Congolese basketball player

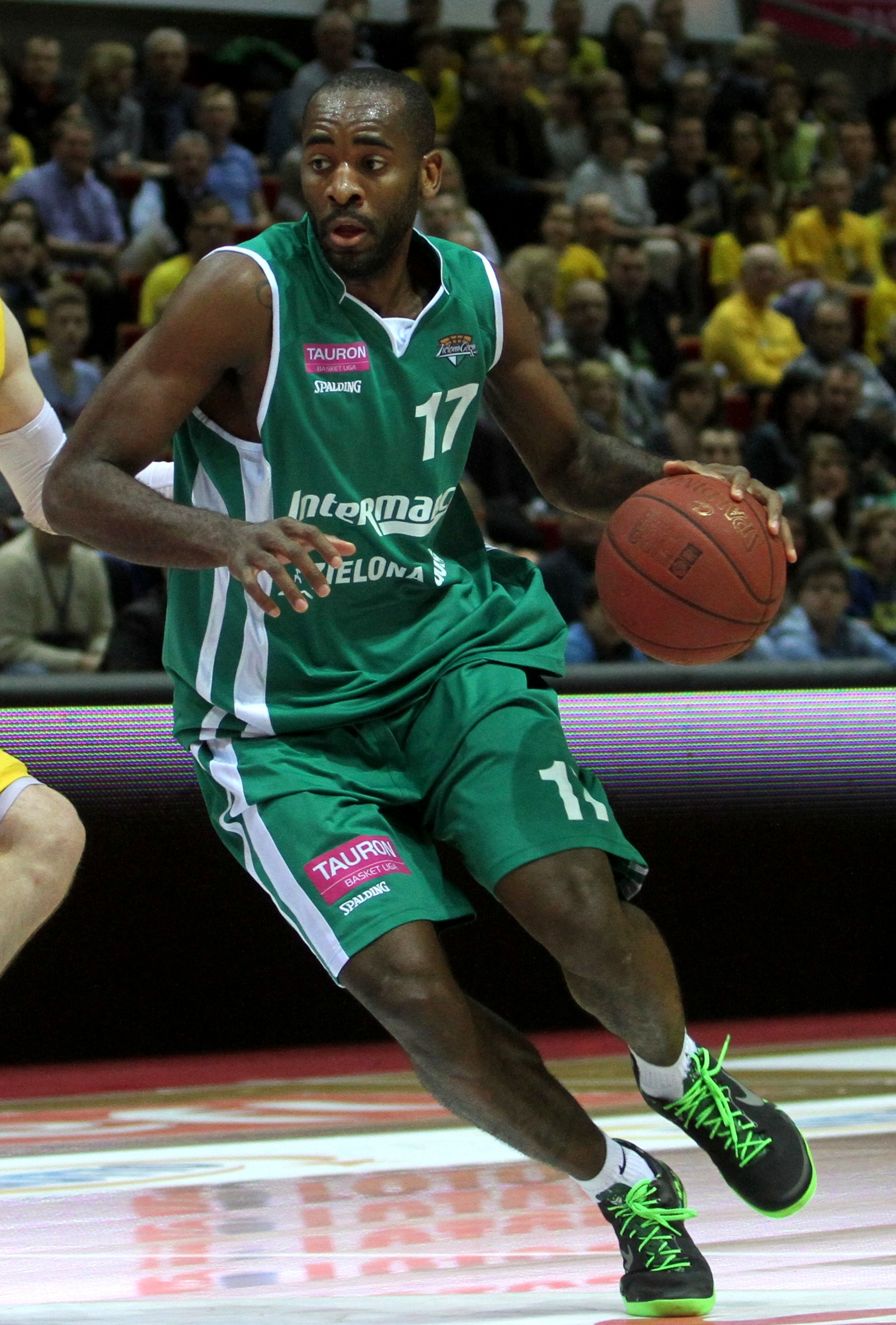
- Eyenga with Zielona Góra in 2014

Personal information
- Born: June 22, 1989 (age 37) Kinshasa, Zaire
- Listed height: 6 ft 6 in (1.98 m)
- Listed weight: 210 lb (95 kg)

Career information
- NBA draft: 2009: 1st round, 30th overall pick
- Drafted by: Cleveland Cavaliers
- Playing career: 2006–2025
- Position: Small forward
- Number: 8, 88, 17, 31, 23

Career history
- 2006–2007: Onatra Kinshasa
- 2007–2010: Joventut Badalona
- 2007–2009: →Prat
- 2010–2012: Cleveland Cavaliers
- 2010–2011: →Erie BayHawks
- 2012: →Canton Charge
- 2011: Joventut Badalona
- 2012: Los Angeles Lakers
- 2012: →Los Angeles D-Fenders
- 2012–2013: Texas Legends
- 2013: Shanxi Loongs
- 2013: Texas Legends
- 2013–2014: Zielona Góra
- 2014–2015: Varese
- 2015–2016: Dinamo Sassari
- 2016: Auxilium Torino
- 2016–2017: Varese
- 2017: Unicaja
- 2017–2023: Fuenlabrada
- 2023–2024: Lille Métropole
- 2024: Gaiteros del Zulia
- 2024: Lobos Plateados de la BUAP
- 2025: Élan Béarnais Pau-Lacq-Orthez
- 2025: Fos Provence Basket

Career highlights
- LBA All-Star Game MVP (2015); ACB Most Spectacular Player (2018)
- Stats at NBA.com
- Stats at Basketball Reference

Christian Eyenga Moenge (born June 22, 1989) is a Congolese former professional basketball player. Eyenga was drafted by the Cleveland Cavaliers with the 30th pick in that year's 2009 NBA draft. When drafted, he played for the Spanish Third Division club Prat, an affiliate of the ACB club DKV Joventut.

== Professional career ==
=== NBA career ===
Eyenga played the 2010 NBA Summer League for the Cleveland Cavaliers. After that, he officially signed a two-year contract with the Cavaliers on July 23, 2010. He signed for $2 million over two years, with years three and four being options. On November 18, Eyenga was sent to the Cavaliers' NBA Development League affiliate, the Erie BayHawks. On January 2, he was recalled by the Cavs and made his debut on the same day, against the Dallas Mavericks. He scored 4 points and grabbed 3 rebounds.

On March 15, 2012, Eyenga was traded along with Ramon Sessions to the Los Angeles Lakers for a protected first-round pick in the 2012 NBA draft, Jason Kapono and Luke Walton.

On August 10, 2012, Eyenga was traded to the Orlando Magic.

On October 23, 2012, Eyenga was waived by the Orlando Magic. He was then drafted by the Texas Legends of the NBA D-League. On January 4, 2013, Eyenga was released by the Legends so he could sign in China. In February 2013, he re-joined the Legends after a month in China.

=== Overseas career ===
In October 2011 he signed to play for Joventut Badalona in Spain during the 2011 NBA lockout.

In January 2013, he signed with Shanxi Zhongyu of China. He left the same month and returned to America.

On July 25, 2013, Eyenga moved to Poland and signed with Stelmet Zielona Góra. On August 4, 2014, he signed a one-year deal with another Polish team Turów Zgorzelec. In September 2014, Eyenga has been waived by the club. On November 12, 2014, he signed a one-season contract with the Italian Serie A team Pallacanestro Varese.

On July 10, 2015, he signed with champions of Italy, Dinamo Sassari for the 2015–16 season. On February 5, 2016, he left Dinamo Sassari, and signed with Auxilium CUS Torino for the rest of the season.

On August 16, 2016, Eyenga signed with Pallacanestro Varese for the 2016–17 season. On May 14, 2017, he signed with Spanish club Unicaja for the rest of the 2016–17 ACB season.

On July 23, 2017, Eyenga signed with Fuenlabrada for the 2017–18 ACB season. At the end of the season Eyenga won the league award for ACB Most Spectacular Player.

He averaged 9.4 points and 3.9 rebounds per game during the 2019–20 season. On August 4, 2020, Eyenga re-signed with the team. He signed a two-year deal with the team on July 3, 3021.

On November 12, 2023, he signed with Lille Métropole of the LNB Pro B.

== Career statistics ==
Legend
GP	Games played	GS	Games started	MPG	Minutes per game
FG%	Field-goal percentage	3P%	3-point field-goal percentage	FT%	Free-throw percentage
RPG	Rebounds per game	APG	Assists per game	SPG	Steals per game
BPG	Blocks per game	PPG	Points per game	PIR	Performance index rating
**Bold**	Career high

=== NBA ===
==== Regular season ====
Year	Team	GP	GS	MPG	FG%	3P%	FT%	RPG	APG	SPG	BPG	PPG
2010–11	Cleveland	**44**	**18**	**21.5**	.425	.275	.643	**2.8**	.8	**.8**	.6	6.9
2011–12	Cleveland	6	0	13.8	.158	**.500**	.333	2.0	.7	.5	.7	0.8
2011–12	L.A. Lakers	1	0	19.0	**.500**	.000	**1.000**	2.0	**1.0**	.0	**1.0**	**8.0**
Career		51	18	20.6	.411	.277	.611	2.7	.8	.7	.6	6.3

==== Playoffs ====
Year	Team	GP	GS	MPG	FG%	3P%	FT%	RPG	APG	SPG	BPG	PPG
2012	L.A. Lakers	3	0	3.0	.667	.000	.000	.7	.3	.3	.3	1.3
Career		3	0	3.0	.667	.000	.000	.7	.3	.3	.3	1.3

=== Euroleague ===
Year	Team	GP	GS	MPG	FG%	3P%	FT%	RPG	APG	SPG	BPG	PPG	PIR
2008–09	DKV Joventut	4	0	4.5	.250	.000	.500	.0	.0	.0	.3	.8	-.3
2013–14	Zielona Góra	**10**	**10**	**27.7**	**.459**	**.200**	**.650**	**4.7**	**1.5**	**.5**	**.9**	**9.2**	**10.1**
Career		14	10	21.1	.449	.200	.667	3.4	1.1	.4	.7	6.8	7.1

== DR Congo national team ==
Eyenga often represents the DR Congo national basketball team at international tournaments. At the 2019 FIBA Basketball World Cup qualification, he averaged 14.7 points, 7.0 rebounds and 3.3 assists per game.
