= Samardo Samuels =

Jamaican basketball player (born 1989)

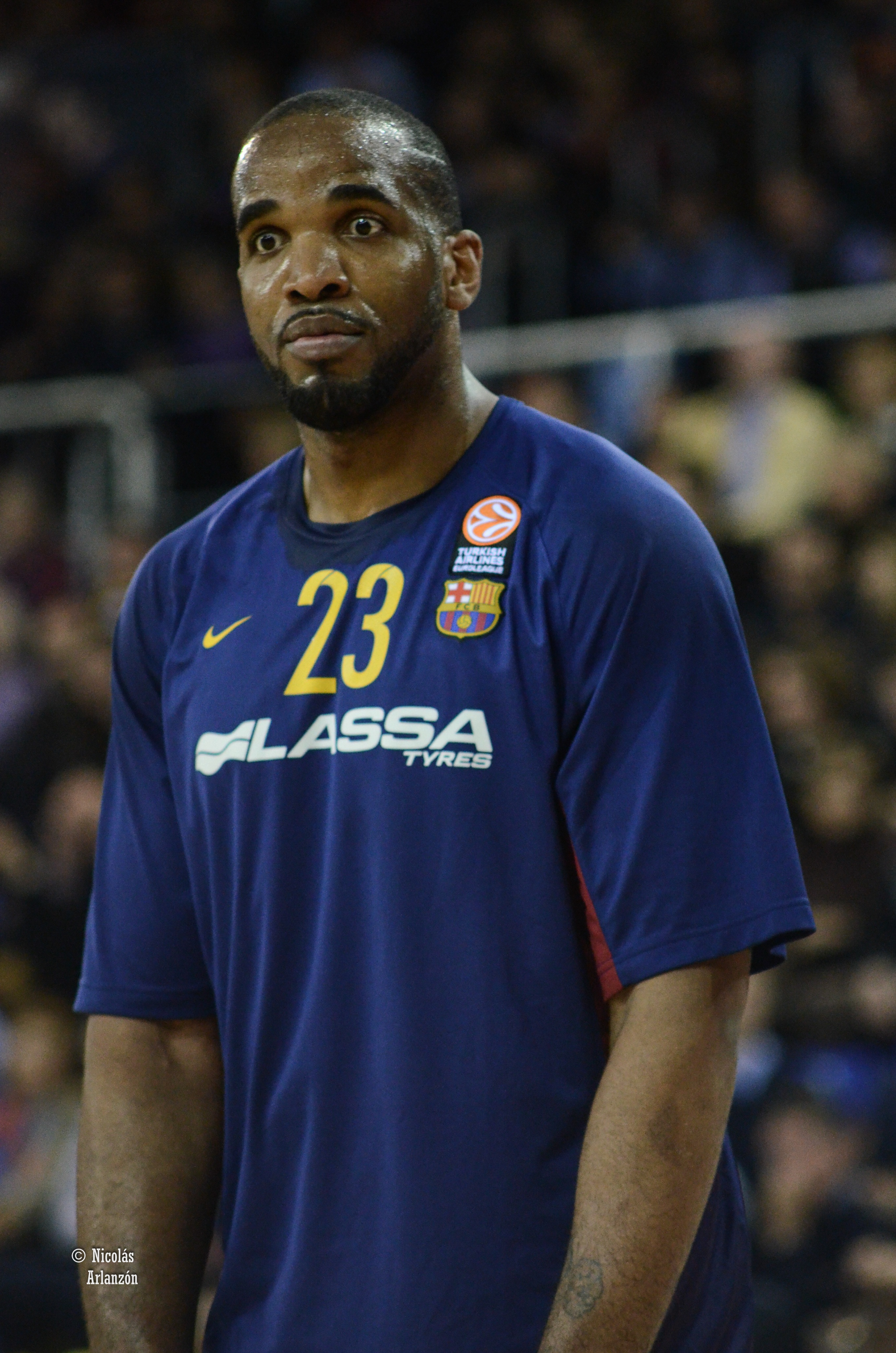
- Samuels with FC Barcelona in 2016

Personal information
- Born: January 9, 1989 (age 37) Trelawny, Jamaica
- Listed height: 6 ft 9 in (2.06 m)
- Listed weight: 270 lb (122 kg)

Career information
- High school: Our Savior New American School (Centereach, New York); Saint Benedict's Prep (Newark, New Jersey)
- College: Louisville (2008–2010)
- NBA draft: 2010: undrafted
- Playing career: 2010–2025
- Position: Center / power forward

Career history
- 2010–2013: Cleveland Cavaliers
- 2010: →Erie BayHawks
- 2012: →Canton Charge
- 2013: Reno Bighorns
- 2013: Hapoel Jerusalem
- 2013–2015: Olimpia Milano
- 2015–2016: Barcelona
- 2016–2017: Jiangsu Dragons
- 2017: Brindisi
- 2017: Partizan
- 2018–2019: Limoges CSP
- 2019–2020: Panionios
- 2020: Chorale Roanne
- 2020–2021: Maccabi Hod HaSharon
- 2021: Hapoel Haifa
- 2021: Libertadores de Querétaro
- 2022: Changwon LG Sakers
- 2022: Libertadores de Querétaro
- 2022–2023: Bashkimi
- 2023–2024: Mayrouba Club
- 2024: Trotamundos de Carabobo
- 2025: Correbasket UAT

Career highlights
- Italian League champion (2014); Greek League All Star (2020); USA Today High School Player of the Year (2008); First-team Parade All-American (2008); McDonald's All-American (2008)
- Stats at NBA.com
- Stats at Basketball Reference
Medals
Men's basketball
Representing Jamaica
FIBA CBC Championship
Gold medal – first place	2009 Tortola

Samardo Anthony Samuels (born January 9, 1989) is a Jamaican former professional basketball player who last played for Trotamundos de Carabobo. He is an NBA Veteran, Italian League Champion and Greek League All-Star. With a global career spanning over 15 years as a professional basketball player, he has played in over 13 countries across the world and represented Jamaica in the FIBA Americas Championship.

== High school career ==
Samuels attended Our Savior New American School in Centereach, New York as a freshman, then attended Saint Benedict's Preparatory School in Newark, New Jersey for the rest of high school. Samuels was ranked 9th in the nation by Rivals.com and 2nd in the nation by Scout.com. He, alongside class of 2010 star Tristan Thompson led St. Benedicts's Prep to a 24–1 record in the 2007–2008 season. At season's end St. Benedict's was ranked #2 in the nation by USA Today. He played in the two top all-American games, the McDonald's All-American Game and the Jordan Brand Classic.

== College career ==
Samuels decided to attend the University of Louisville for college. He chose the Cardinals over Connecticut, Florida, Georgetown and North Carolina. At Louisville, Samuels started every game that he played in and led the 2009–10 team in scoring and rebounding. After his sophomore year, he decided to skip his final two years of college eligibility and enter the 2010 NBA draft.

== Professional career ==
=== Cleveland Cavaliers (2010–13) ===
After going undrafted in the 2010 NBA draft, Samuels played for the Chicago Bulls in the 2010 NBA Summer League, averaging 12.6 points and 7.4 rebounds. On August 17, 2010, Samuels signed a 3-year, $2.3 million contract with the Cleveland Cavaliers. A portion of the deal was guaranteed.

He debuted against the Toronto Raptors, on October 29, and scored 7 points. On December 27, 2010, he was sent to the Erie BayHawks, the Cavs' affiliate in the NBA Development League. On January 1, after two games in the NBA D-League, he was recalled by the Cavs.

On March 2, 2011, Samuels made his first career start against the San Antonio Spurs in place of the injured Antawn Jamison and scored a career high 23 points while pulling down 10 rebounds.

On December 28, 2012, Samuels was assigned to the Canton Charge of the D-League. He was recalled on December 31, 2012. On January 6, 2013, he was waived by the Cavaliers.

=== Several short stints (2013) ===
Following the waiving by the Cavaliers, he was acquired by the D-League's Reno Bighorns on January 17, 2013.

On April 7, 2013, Samuels signed with the Israeli club Hapoel Jerusalem for the rest of the 2012–13 season.

=== Olimpia Milano (2013–15) ===
On July 25, 2013, he signed a two-year deal with the Italian club Emporio Armani Milano. In his first Euroleague season with Milano, he averaged 9.5 points and 3.9 rebounds over 25 games. In his second season with Milano, he elevated his game and averaged 12.9 points and 5.4 rebounds over 23 Euroleague games. In the summer of 2015, he parted ways with Olimpia Milano.

=== Barcelona (2015–16) ===
On July 22, 2015, Samuels signed a two-year deal with the Spanish club FC Barcelona Lassa. On September 11, 2015, Barcelona announced that Samuels has suffered right hand injury and will miss about 6 weeks of action. In his third consecutive Euroleague season, his role in the new team decreased, and he had averages of 6 points and 2.8 rebounds over 26 games. On August 16, 2016, he parted ways with Barcelona.

=== Jiangsu Dragons (2016–17) ===
On August 17, 2016, Samuels signed with the Chinese Basketball Association club Jiangsu Dragons for the 2016–17 CBA season.

=== Several short stints (2017–2022) ===
On March 17, 2017, he signed with the Italian club Enel Brindisi for the rest of the 2016–17 LBA season.

On August 18, 2017, Samuels signed with the Spanish club Real Betis Energía Plus. On September 21, 2017, he parted ways with Real Betis Energía Plus before appearing in a game for them.

On October 16, 2017, Samuels signed with the Serbian club Partizan for the rest of the 2017–18 season. He was suspended by the club on November 15, for the violation of club's discipline and the provisions of the contract, day after Partizan lost in a EuroCup game against Alba Berlin. The suspension came as a result of his public criticism of the club, head coach Miroslav Nikolić and other inappropriate remarks toward female journalists. Shortly after, he parted ways with the club.

On February 14, 2018, Samuels signed with the French club Limoges CSP for the rest of the 2017–18 season. After averaging 11 points and 4 rebounds per game, he re-signed with the club on August 20, 2018. In October 2018, Samuels was suspended after speaking harshly towards his coach and during a match which resulted him in being sidelined for the rest of the game.

On February 16, 2020, Samuels signed with Chorale Roanne Basket.

In December 2020, Samuels signed with Maccabi Hod HaSharon. He played 17 games in the Liga Leumit, the second national tier, and averaged 16.2 points and 7.8 rebounds. On April 18, 2021, he has signed with Hapoel Haifa of the Israel Basketball Premier League.

On August 10, 2021, Samuels signed a one-year contract with Dutch club ZZ Leiden of the BNXT League. On August 30, 2021, he parted away with his club without playing a single game. Reason was that the work permit procedure took too long. Samuels subsequently joined Libertadores de Querétaro of the Liga Nacional de Baloncesto Profesional.

== Personal life ==
In March 2025, Samuels was arrested in Milan, Italy.

== Career statistics ==
Legend
GP	Games played	GS	Games started	MPG	Minutes per game
FG%	Field-goal percentage	3P%	3-point field-goal percentage	FT%	Free-throw percentage
RPG	Rebounds per game	APG	Assists per game	SPG	Steals per game
BPG	Blocks per game	PPG	Points per game	PIR	Performance index rating
**Bold**	Career high

=== NBA ===
==== Regular season ====
Year	Team	GP	GS	MPG	FG%	3P%	FT%	RPG	APG	SPG	BPG	PPG
2010–11	Cleveland	37	**10**	**18.9**	**.456**	.000	.618	**4.3**	**.5**	**.4**	**.5**	**7.8**
2011–12	Cleveland	**54**	0	15.3	.455	.000	**.701**	3.3	.4	**.4**	.4	5.4
2012–13	Cleveland	18	1	10.9	.367	.000	.583	1.6	.4	.2	.2	3.2
Career		109	11	15.8	.445	.000	.653	3.4	.4	.3	.4	5.9

==== Career highs ====
- Points: **23** vs. San Antonio 03/02/11
- Rebounds: **10** 3 times
- Assists: **3** vs. San Antonio 03/02/11
- Steals: **3** @ L.A. Clippers 03/19/11
- Blocks: **3** vs. New Orleans 03/06/11

=== EuroLeague ===
Year	Team	GP	GS	MPG	FG%	3P%	FT%	RPG	APG	SPG	BPG	PPG	PIR
2013–14	Milano	25	**23**	22.2	.503	**.444**	**.730**	3.9	.2	**.4**	.3	9.5	8.5
2014–15	Milano	23	21	**26.1**	**.548**	.233	.692	**5.4**	**.7**	**.4**	**.5**	**12.9**	**14.3**
2015–16	Barcelona	**26**	4	13.2	.505	.000	.632	2.8	.5	.2	.4	6.0	6.8
Career		74	48	24.1	.522	.250	.685	4.0	.5	.3	.4	9.3	9.7

==== Career highs ====
- Points: **36** vs. Nizhny Novgorod 26 February 2015
- Rebounds: **12** vs. Anadolu Efes 21 March 2014
- Assists: **3** vs. Turów Zgorzelec 13 November 2014
- Steals: **4** vs. Laboral Kutxa 13 March 2014
- Blocks: **4** vs. Stelmet Zielona Góra 23 October 2015
