= Donald Sloan (basketball) =

American basketball player (born 1988)

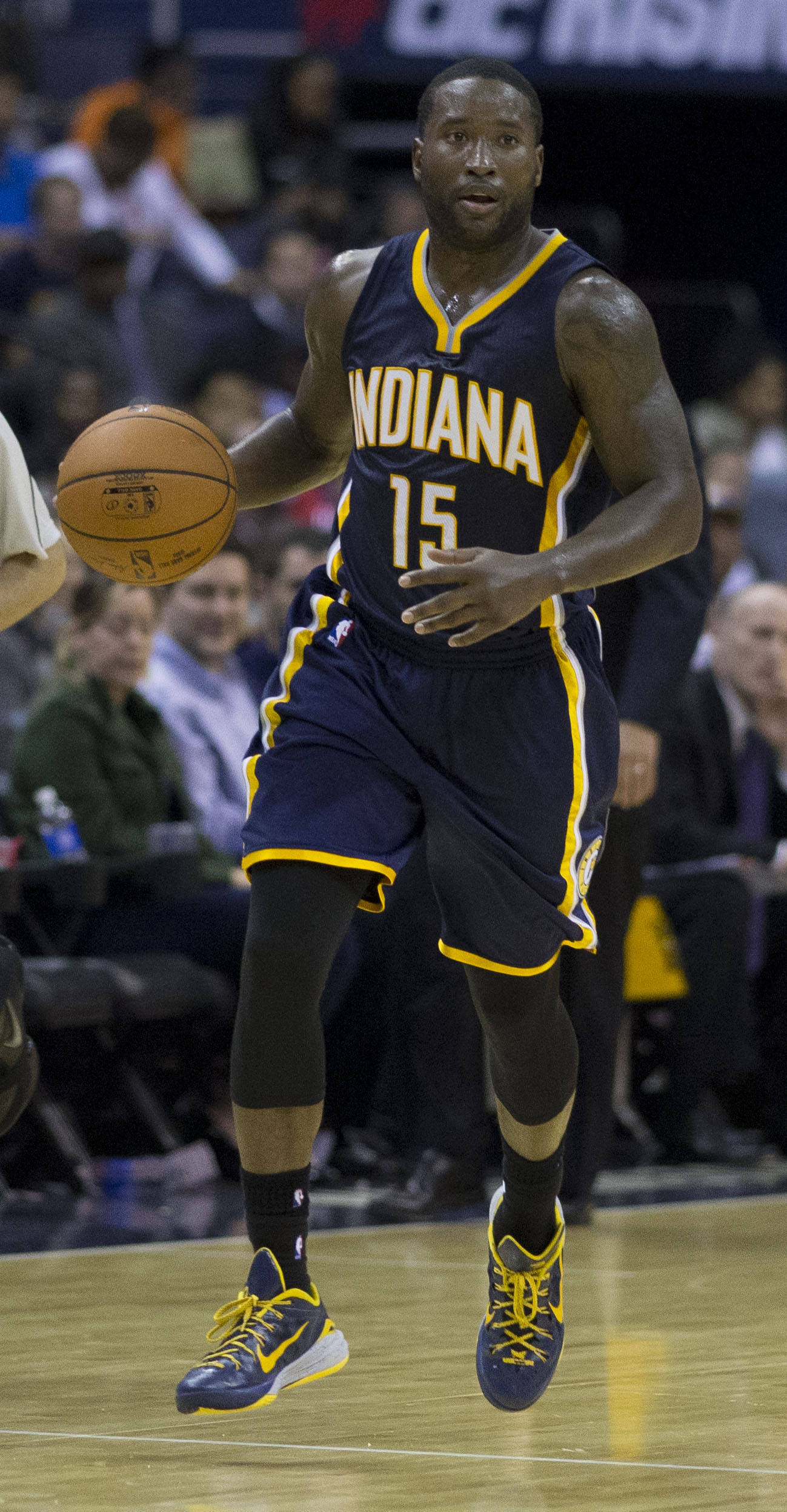
- Sloan with the Indiana Pacers in 2014

Personal information
- Born: January 15, 1988 (age 38) Shreveport, Louisiana, U.S.
- Listed height: 6 ft 3 in (1.91 m)
- Listed weight: 205 lb (93 kg)

Career information
- High school: Seagoville (Dallas, Texas)
- College: Texas A&M (2006–2010)
- NBA draft: 2010: undrafted
- Playing career: 2010–2021
- Position: Point guard / shooting guard
- Number: 12, 15

Career history
- 2010–2011: Reno Bighorns
- 2011: Barangay Ginebra Kings
- 2011: Erie BayHawks
- 2011–2012: Atlanta Hawks
- 2012: New Orleans Hornets
- 2012: Erie BayHawks
- 2012: Cleveland Cavaliers
- 2013: Sioux Falls Skyforce
- 2013: New Orleans Hornets
- 2013: Guangdong Southern Tigers
- 2013–2015: Indiana Pacers
- 2015–2016: Brooklyn Nets
- 2016–2017: Guangdong Southern Tigers
- 2017–2018: Texas Legends
- 2018: Guangdong Southern Tigers
- 2018–2019: Jiangsu Dragons
- 2020: Telekom Baskets Bonn
- 2020–2021: Adelaide 36ers

Career highlights
- CBA champion (2013); First-team All-Big 12 (2010)
- Stats at NBA.com
- Stats at Basketball Reference
Medals
Men's basketball
Representing United States
Pan American Games
Bronze medal – third place	2011 Guadalajara	National team

Donald Wayne Sloan (born January 15, 1988) is an American former professional basketball player. He played college basketball for the Texas A&M Aggies. Sloan played parts of five seasons in the National Basketball Association (NBA) for the Atlanta Hawks, New Orleans Hornets, Cleveland Cavaliers, Indiana Pacers and Brooklyn Nets. He played in the NBA D-League and Chinese Basketball Association in between NBA stints.

== High school career ==
Sloan attended Seagoville High School in the Dallas, Texas area. Over three seasons Sloan's team was 93–10 and Sloan led Seagoville to the regional championship game as a senior. Sloan received two-time all-state recognition.

Considered a four-star recruit by Rivals.com, Sloan was listed as the No. 8 point guard and the No. 55 player in the nation in 2006.

Sloan was recruited by Kansas, Oklahoma, Marquette, SMU, and Georgia Tech. He signed with Texas A&M and Coach Billy Gillispie in November 2005.

== College career ==
Sloan played basketball for Texas A&M University from 2006 to 2010. He was a part of a senior class that won 100 career games at the conclusion of the 2009–10 season, setting the school record for wins by a single class. As a senior during the 2009–10 season, Sloan led the Aggies in scoring with a 17.8 points per game average and was a first team All-Big 12 Conference selection.

=== Freshman year ===
Sloan appeared in all 34 games in 2006–07 as a true freshman, averaging 5.2 points, 1.9 rebounds and 1.8 assists per game. Sloan earned ESPN player of the game honors with 15 points in a win at Oklahoma State. Texas A&M finished the year with a 27–7 record and advanced to the Sweet Sixteen.

=== Sophomore year ===
As a sophomore, Sloan started all 36 games as A&M finished 25–11 after a second round robbery to UCLA in the NCAA tournament. Sloan was third on the team in scoring at 9.5 points per game and he was second on the team with 123 assists.

=== Junior year ===
Sloan played in all 34 games as the Aggies finished 24–10 following a second round loss to Connecticut in the NCAA tournament. Sloan averaged 11.8 points and 3.6 rebounds per game and led the team with 108 assists.

=== Senior year ===
Sloan, considered by his teammates to be the team's leader, was the leading scorer on a Texas A&M team that finished the regular season with a 22–8 record overall and an 11-5 conference mark, tying the team for second place in the Big 12 Conference. Sloan scored a career high 29 points in an 84–81 loss to New Mexico on December 12. He was third in the Big 12 in scoring. Sloan was named to the Big 12's first team all conference by Big 12 coaches, Dallas Morning News, Columbia Daily Tribune, and Fort Worth Star Telegram. Sloan also received second team all Big 12 Conference honors from the Associated Press and Austin American-Statesman. He received national player of the week honors for the week of February 9 by CollegeHoops.net and was a strong contender for the 2009–2010 Big 12 Conference Player of the Year Award. Sloan honored teammate and close friend Derrick Roland, whose season was ended by a broken tibia and fibula, by shaving Roland's #3 into his hair for much of the season.

Following the conference tournament, Sloan was named to the all-tournament team. He finished the 2010 NCAA tournament ranked seventh in Aggie history in career scoring with 1,522 points and eighth in assists with 370.

== Professional career ==
=== Reno Bighorns (2010–2011) ===
After going undrafted in the 2010 NBA draft, Sloan joined the Sacramento Kings for the 2010 NBA Summer League. He later signed a one-year, non-guaranteed contract with the Kings. However, he was later waived by the Kings on October 4, 2010. On October 30, 2010, he was acquired by the Reno Bighorns of the NBA D-League as an affiliate player.

=== Barangay Ginebra Kings (2011) ===
In July 2011, he signed with the Barangay Ginebra Kings of the Philippine Basketball Association for the 2011 Governors' Cup.

=== Erie BayHawks (2011) ===
On November 2, 2011, he was reacquired by the Reno Bighorns. Two days later, he was traded to the Erie BayHawks.

=== Atlanta Hawks (2011–2012) ===
On December 9, 2011, Sloan signed with the Atlanta Hawks. On January 27, 2012, he was waived by the Hawks.

=== New Orleans Hornets (2012) ===
On February 8, 2012, he signed a 10-day contract with the New Orleans Hornets. On February 18, 2012, he was not offered a second 10-day contract after his first 10-day contract expired.

=== Return to Erie (2012) ===
On March 5, 2012, he returned to the Erie BayHawks.

=== Cleveland Cavaliers (2012) ===
On March 16, 2012, he signed with the Cleveland Cavaliers .

In July 2012, he joined the Cavaliers for the 2012 NBA Summer League. On December 25, 2012, Sloan was waived by the Cavaliers. On the Aussie Hoopla podcast Sloan discussed how he was brought into back-up rookie Kyrie Irving, however Irving become injured as soon as Sloan was signed and then after Irving became healthy the Cavs waived Sloan on Christmas Day.

=== Return to New Orleans and Sioux Falls (2013) ===
On January 3, 2013, he was acquired by the Sioux Falls Skyforce. On January 7, 2013, he signed a 10-day contract with the New Orleans Hornets after just two games with the Skyforce. After the contract expired, he returned to the Skyforce.

=== Guangdong Southern Tigers (2013) ===
In February 2013, Sloan was released by the Skyforce in order to join the Guangdong Southern Tigers of the Chinese Basketball Association.

=== Indiana Pacers (2013–2015) ===
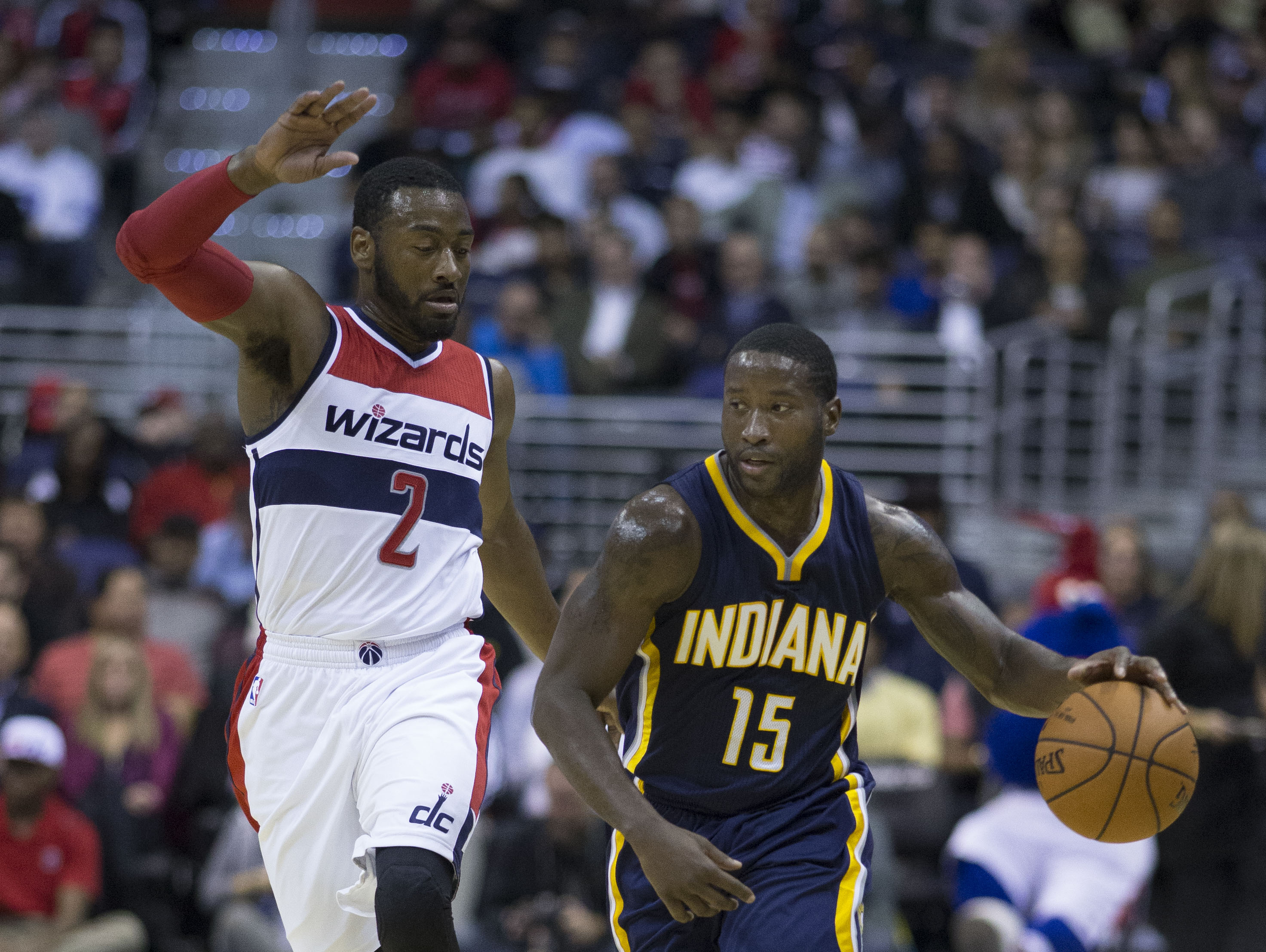
Sloan defended by John Wall of the Washington Wizards during a 2014 game

On July 3, 2013, he signed a two-year deal with the Indiana Pacers and joined them for the 2013 NBA Summer League. In July 2014, he re-joined the Pacers for the 2014 NBA Summer League. On November 5, 2014, he scored a career-high 31 points in the Pacers' 96–94 overtime loss to the Washington Wizards.

=== Brooklyn Nets (2015–2016) ===
On August 10, 2015, Sloan signed with the Brooklyn Nets. On January 15, 2016, he recorded a near triple-double with 15 points, 9 rebounds and 9 assists in a loss to the Portland Trail Blazers.

=== Return to Guangdong (2016–2017) ===
On July 20, 2016, Sloan signed with the Guangdong Southern Tigers for the 2016–17 season, returning to the club for a second stint. The Guangdong Southern Tigers advanced to the 2017 CBA Finals, but lost to the Xinjiang Flying Tigers in a 4–0 sweep.

=== Texas Legends (2017–2018) ===
Sloan signed with the Washington Wizards under a training camp deal. He was waived on October 14 as one of the team's final preseason roster cuts. He then joined the Texas Legends of the NBA G League. On January 22, 2018, Sloan was named the NBA G League Player of the Week after averaging 29.0 points, 4.3 rebounds, and 9.0 assists in three games.

=== Third stint with Guangdong (2018) ===
On February 21, 2018, Guangdong Southern Tigers announced the signing of Sloan for a third stint with the team.

Sloan signed with the Denver Nuggets to a training camp contract but was waived on October 13, 2018.

=== Telekom Baskets Bonn (2020) ===
On February 26, 2020, Sloan signed with Telekom Baskets Bonn of the German Basketball Bundesliga (BBL). He played in three games and averaged 11.7 points per game until the season was postponed due to the COVID-19 pandemic.

=== Adelaide 36ers (2020–2021) ===
On August 20, 2020, Sloan signed with the Adelaide 36ers of the Australian National Basketball League (NBL). He scored three points in his NBL debut against Melbourne United on January 15, 2021. Sloan was moved from the starting line-up in favor of Josh Giddey and scored a season-high 20 points in his first game off the bench on January 22, 2021, against the New Zealand Breakers. On February 7, 2021, he was granted a release by the 36ers to pursue other international opportunities.

== NBA career statistics ==
Legend
GP	Games played	GS	Games started	MPG	Minutes per game
FG%	Field goal percentage	3P%	3-point field goal percentage	FT%	Free throw percentage
RPG	Rebounds per game	APG	Assists per game	SPG	Steals per game
BPG	Blocks per game	PPG	Points per game	**Bold**	Career high

=== Regular season ===
Year	Team	GP	GS	MPG	FG%	3P%	FT%	RPG	APG	SPG	BPG	PPG
2011–12	Atlanta	5	0	4.0	.375	.000	.000	1.0	1.0	.2	.0	1.2
2011–12	New Orleans	3	0	13.7	.357	.000	.500	1.0	2.7	**.7**	.0	4.0
2011–12	Cleveland	25	11	**24.3**	.403	.091	**.808**	2.4	3.7	.4	**.1**	6.6
2012–13	Cleveland	20	0	12.9	.346	.368	.800	1.4	1.9	.3	.0	4.1
2012–13	New Orleans	3	0	2.0	.000	.000	.000	.0	.3	.0	.0	.0
2013–14	Indiana	48	1	8.2	.376	.238	.600	.9	1.0	.2	.0	2.3
2014–15	Indiana	53	21	20.9	.408	.313	.779	2.7	3.6	.4	.0	**7.4**
2015–16	Brooklyn	**61**	**33**	21.6	**.440**	**.384**	.750	**2.8**	**4.4**	.5	**.1**	7.0
Career		218	66	17.2	.409	.310	.754	2.1	3.0	.4	.0	5.5

=== Playoffs ===
Year	Team	GP	GS	MPG	FG%	3P%	FT%	RPG	APG	SPG	BPG	PPG
2014	Indiana	4	0	3.8	.286	.250	.500	.3	.8	.3	.0	1.8
Career		4	0	3.8	.286	.250	.500	.3	.8	.3	.0	1.8
