= JJ Hickson =

American basketball player (born 1988)

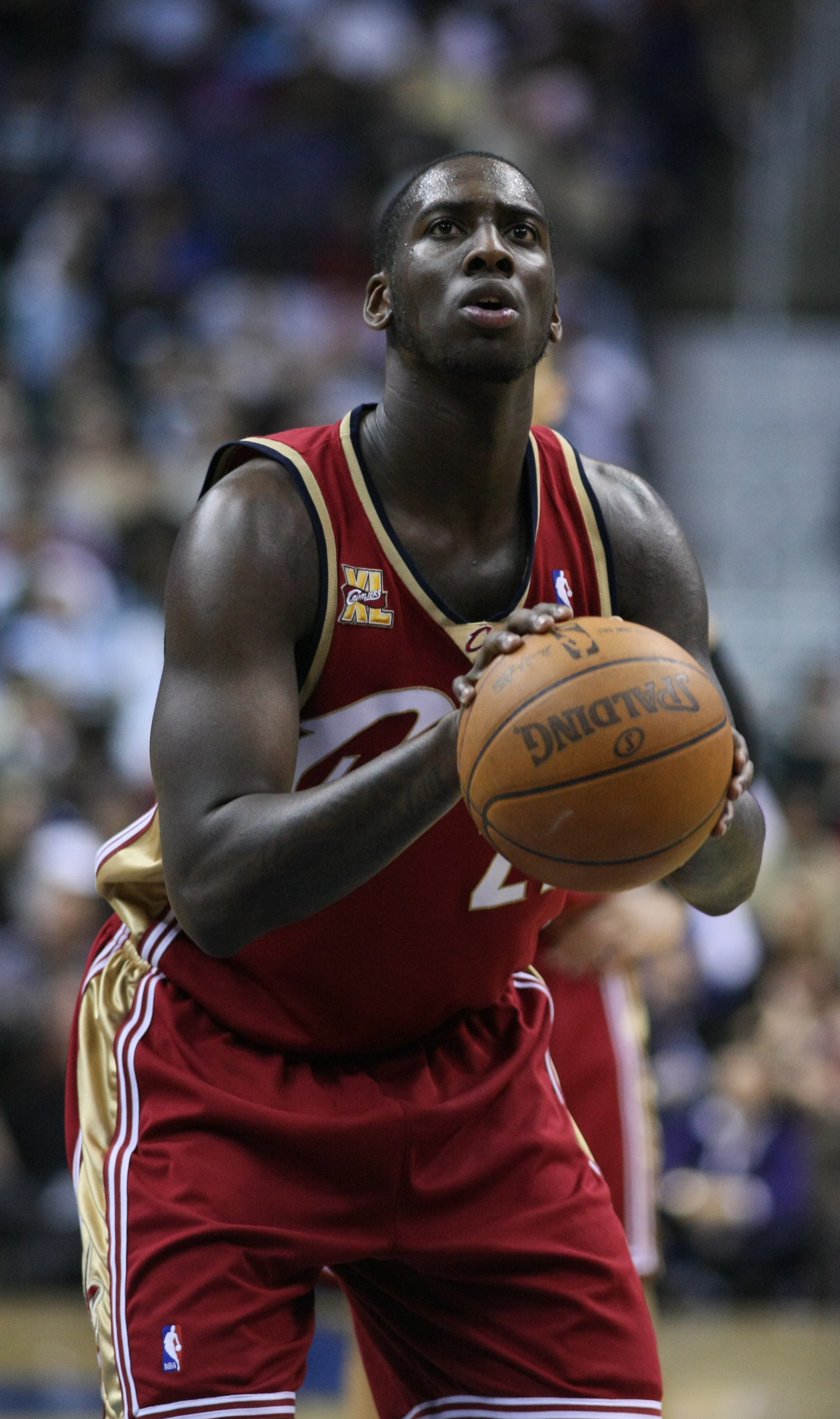
- Hickson with the Cleveland Cavaliers in 2009

Personal information
- Born: September 4, 1988 (age 37) Atlanta, Georgia, U.S.
- Listed height: 6 ft 9 in (2.06 m)
- Listed weight: 242 lb (110 kg)

Career information
- High school: Joseph Wheeler (Marietta, Georgia)
- College: NC State (2007–2008)
- NBA draft: 2008: 1st round, 19th overall pick
- Drafted by: Cleveland Cavaliers
- Playing career: 2008–2019
- Position: Power forward / center
- Number: 21, 31, 7

Career history
- 2008–2011: Cleveland Cavaliers
- 2011: Bnei HaSharon
- 2011–2012: Sacramento Kings
- 2012–2013: Portland Trail Blazers
- 2013–2016: Denver Nuggets
- 2016: Washington Wizards
- 2016–2017: Fujian Sturgeons
- 2017: Jiangsu Tongxi
- 2018: Champville SC
- 2019: Leones de Ponce

Career highlights
- ACC All-Freshman Team (2008); McDonald's All-American (2007); Second-team Parade All-American (2007)
- Stats at NBA.com
- Stats at Basketball Reference

James Edward "JJ" Hickson Jr. (born September 4, 1988) is an American former professional basketball player. He played one season of college basketball for North Carolina State University before being drafted 19th overall by the Cleveland Cavaliers in the 2008 NBA draft. He played in the NBA for the Cavaliers, Denver Nuggets, Sacramento Kings, and Portland Trail Blazers, as well as in Israel for Bnei HaSharon during the 2011 NBA lockout.

== High school career ==
Hickson attended Joseph Wheeler High School in Marietta, Georgia. In the class of 2007, he was ranked as the No. 10 overall recruit and No. 2 power forward by Rivals.com and as the No. 13 overall and the No. 3 power forward by Scout.com. In 2005–06, Hickson took Wheeler High to the 5A Final Four. As a senior in 2006–07, he averaged 25.9 points, 13.8 rebounds and 3.0 blocks per game as he earned McDonald's All-American honors.

== College career ==
Hickson played one season of college basketball for NC State in 2007–08. In his first game as a freshman, Hickson scored 31 points, making all 12 of his attempted field goals against William & Mary, setting an NCAA Division I record for field goal percentage (minimum 12 makes) by a player in his first career game. Hickson was named ACC Rookie of the Week on three occasions, scored 20 or more points seven times and registered 10 double-doubles. He set an ACC single-game freshman record by pulling down a career-high 23 rebounds and also added 13 points and four blocked shots versus Clemson. Hickson scored a career-high 33 points on 10–of–11 shooting and grabbed 13 rebounds against Western Carolina University, and put up 27 points and 14 rebounds against Miami in the first round of the ACC tournament.

For the season, he averaged 14.8 points and 8.5 rebounds (leading all freshmen) while shooting 59% from the field. He was selected to the All-Freshman team in the ACC, and an honorable mention for All-ACC.

=== College statistics ===
Year	Team	GP	GS	MPG	FG%	3P%	FT%	RPG	APG	SPG	BPG	PPG
2007–08	NC State	31	31	28.7	.591	.000	.677	8.5	1.0	0.7	1.5	14.8

== Professional career ==
=== Cleveland Cavaliers (2008–2011) ===
Hickson was selected with 19th overall pick in the 2008 NBA draft by the Cleveland Cavaliers. On July 10, 2008, he signed his rookie scale contract with the Cavaliers. He went on to score four points in his NBA debut against the Charlotte Bobcats, making one field goal and two free throws. On November 26, 2008, he had career-highs with 14 points, six rebounds and four blocks against the Oklahoma City Thunder. Hickson surpassed his career-high by grabbing seven rebounds on January 13, 2009, against the Memphis Grizzlies. Then on February 24, 2009, he surpassed his previous career-high of 7 rebounds to 9 rebounds against the Grizzlies.

On October 26, 2009, the Cavaliers exercised their third-year team option on Hickson's rookie scale contract, extending the contract through the 2010–11 season. On January 27, 2010, Hickson set a new career-high in scoring with 23 points against the Minnesota Timberwolves.

On October 23, 2010, the Cavaliers exercised their fourth-year team option on Hickson's rookie scale contract, extending the contract through the 2011–12 season. On November 2, 2010, Hickson had a career-high 31 points in a losing effort to the Atlanta Hawks. On January 22, Hickson grabbed a career-high 20 rebounds, including a career-high 11 offensive rebounds, against the Chicago Bulls. On February 25, he set a career high of five blocks in a victory over the New York Knicks.

=== Sacramento Kings (2011–2012) ===
On June 30, 2011, Hickson was traded to the Sacramento Kings in exchange for Omri Casspi and Sacramento's protected first-round pick in the 2012 NBA draft.

On October 21, 2011, Hickson signed with Bnei HaSharon of the Israeli Basketball Premier League for the duration of the NBA lockout. After making his lone appearance for Bnei on October 30, Hickson was released by the club on November 5. In December 2011, following the conclusion of the lockout, he joined the Sacramento Kings. He went on to play 35 games for Sacramento in 2011–12 before he was waived by the franchise on March 19, 2012.

=== Portland Trail Blazers (2012–2013) ===
On March 21, 2012, Hickson was claimed off waivers by the Portland Trail Blazers.

On July 13, 2012, Hickson re-signed with the Trail Blazers to a one-year deal. In 2012–13, he averaged a career-high 10.4 rebounds, as well as 12.7 points per game.

=== Denver Nuggets (2013–2016) ===
On July 11, 2013, Hickson signed with the Denver Nuggets. On February 25, 2014, Hickson recorded 16 points and a career-high 25 rebounds in a 95–100 loss to the Portland Trail Blazers. On March 22, 2014, it was announced that Hickson would miss the rest of the season after tearing his anterior cruciate ligament in the March 21 loss to the Dallas Mavericks.

On September 17, 2014, Hickson was suspended by the NBA for the first five games of the 2014–15 season for violating the NBA's anti-drug policy.

On February 19, 2016, Hickson was waived by the Nuggets.

=== Washington Wizards (2016) ===
On February 25, 2016, Hickson signed with the Washington Wizards. Three days later, he made his debut with the Wizards in a 113–99 win over the Cleveland Cavaliers, recording two points and two rebounds in six minutes off the bench.

=== Fuijan Sturgeons (2016–2017) ===
On August 20, 2016, Hickson signed with the Fujian Sturgeons of the Chinese Basketball Association.

=== Jiangsu Tongxi (2017) ===
On August 11, 2017, Hickson signed with Jiangsu Tongxi of the Chinese Basketball Association.

=== Champville (2018) ===
On April 2, 2018, Hickson signed with Champville SC of the Lebanese Basketball Federation.

Hickson was arrested after the season's ending along with two other persons and charged with burglary, physical assault and armed robbery with a knife of a man from Coweta County, Georgia.

=== Leones de Ponce (2019) ===
On May 8, 2019, Leones de Ponce announced that they had signed Hickson.

== NBA career statistics ==
Legend
GP	Games played	GS	Games started	MPG	Minutes per game
FG%	Field goal percentage	3P%	3-point field goal percentage	FT%	Free throw percentage
RPG	Rebounds per game	APG	Assists per game	SPG	Steals per game
BPG	Blocks per game	PPG	Points per game	**Bold**	Career high

=== Regular season ===
Year	Team	GP	GS	MPG	FG%	3P%	FT%	RPG	APG	SPG	BPG	PPG
2008–09	Cleveland	62	0	11.4	.515	.000	.672	2.7	.1	.2	.5	4.0
2009–10	Cleveland	**81**	73	20.9	.554	.000	**.681**	4.9	.5	.4	.5	8.5
2010–11	Cleveland	80	66	28.2	.458	.000	.673	8.7	1.1	.6	.7	13.8
2011–12	Sacramento	35	9	18.4	.370	.000	.638	5.1	.6	.5	.5	4.7
2011–12	Portland	19	10	**31.6**	.543	.000	.645	8.3	1.2	.6	**.9**	**15.1**
2012–13	Portland	80	**80**	29.0	**.562**	.000	.679	**10.4**	1.1	.6	.6	12.7
2013–14	Denver	69	52	26.9	.508	.000	.517	9.2	**1.4**	**.7**	.7	11.8
2014–15	Denver	73	8	19.3	.475	.000	.577	6.2	.8	.5	.5	7.6
2015–16	Denver	20	9	15.3	.505	.000	.458	4.4	.8	.5	.6	6.9
2015–16	Washington	15	0	8.7	.543	.000	.432	3.0	.5	.3	.1	4.6
Career		534	307	22.3	.505	.000	.617	6.8	.8	.5	.6	9.5

=== Playoffs ===
Year	Team	GP	GS	MPG	FG%	3P%	FT%	RPG	APG	SPG	BPG	PPG
2010	Cleveland	11	0	7.2	.626	.000	.688	.8	.1	.0	.0	3.5
Career		11	0	7.2	.626	.000	.688	.8	.1	.0	.0	3.5

== Personal life ==
Hickson was arrested on June 16, 2018, in connection with a home invasion and robbery in the greater Atlanta area.

== See also ==
- List of North Carolina State University people
