= Joey Graham =

American basketball player (born 1982)

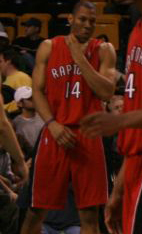
- Graham with the Toronto Raptors in 2007

Personal information
- Born: June 11, 1982 (age 44) Wilmington, Delaware, U.S.
- Listed height: 6 ft 7 in (2.01 m)
- Listed weight: 225 lb (102 kg)

Career information
- High school: Brandon (Brandon, Florida)
- College: UCF (2000–2002); Oklahoma State (2003–2005)
- NBA draft: 2005: 1st round, 16th overall pick
- Drafted by: Toronto Raptors
- Playing career: 2005–2013
- Position: Small forward
- Number: 14, 12

Career history
- 2005–2009: Toronto Raptors
- 2009–2010: Denver Nuggets
- 2010–2011: Cleveland Cavaliers
- 2012: Erie BayHawks
- 2012: Mets de Guaynabo
- 2013: Capitanes de Arecibo
- 2013: Mets de Guaynabo

Career highlights
- Third-team All-American – AP, NABC (2005); First-team All-Big 12 (2005); Third-team All-Big 12 (2004); Big 12 Newcomer of the Year (2004); Big 12 tournament MVP (2005)
- Stats at NBA.com
- Stats at Basketball Reference

Joseph Graham (born June 11, 1982) is an American former professional basketball player who played six seasons in the National Basketball Association (NBA). He holds the NBA draft combine bench press record.

== College career ==
Graham played college basketball for the University of Central Florida (2000–02) and Oklahoma State University (2003–05). He averaged 13.0 points and 5.2 rebounds in four collegiate seasons and helped OSU to the Final Four in his junior campaign.

== Professional career ==
=== Toronto Raptors (2005–2009) ===
Graham was selected by the Toronto Raptors with the 16th overall pick in the 2005 NBA draft. In his first two seasons with the Raptors, he averaged 6.5 points and 3.1 rebounds in 159 regular season games, and shot .826 (218–264) from the charity stripe. He registered a career-high 19 points on five occasions and grabbed a personal-best 12 rebounds on March 30, 2007, against the Washington Wizards.

Graham missed the majority of Toronto's November schedule in the 2007–08 season. He appeared in a career-low 38 games in 2007–08. He averaged career highs in 2008–09, with 7.7 points and 3.7 rebounds per game. On February 1, 2009, he recorded a career-high-tying 12 rebounds against the Orlando Magic. Three days later, he scored a career-high 24 points against the Los Angeles Lakers. Another six days later, he tied his career high with 24 points against the Minnesota Timberwolves.

=== Denver Nuggets and Cleveland Cavaliers (2009–2011) ===
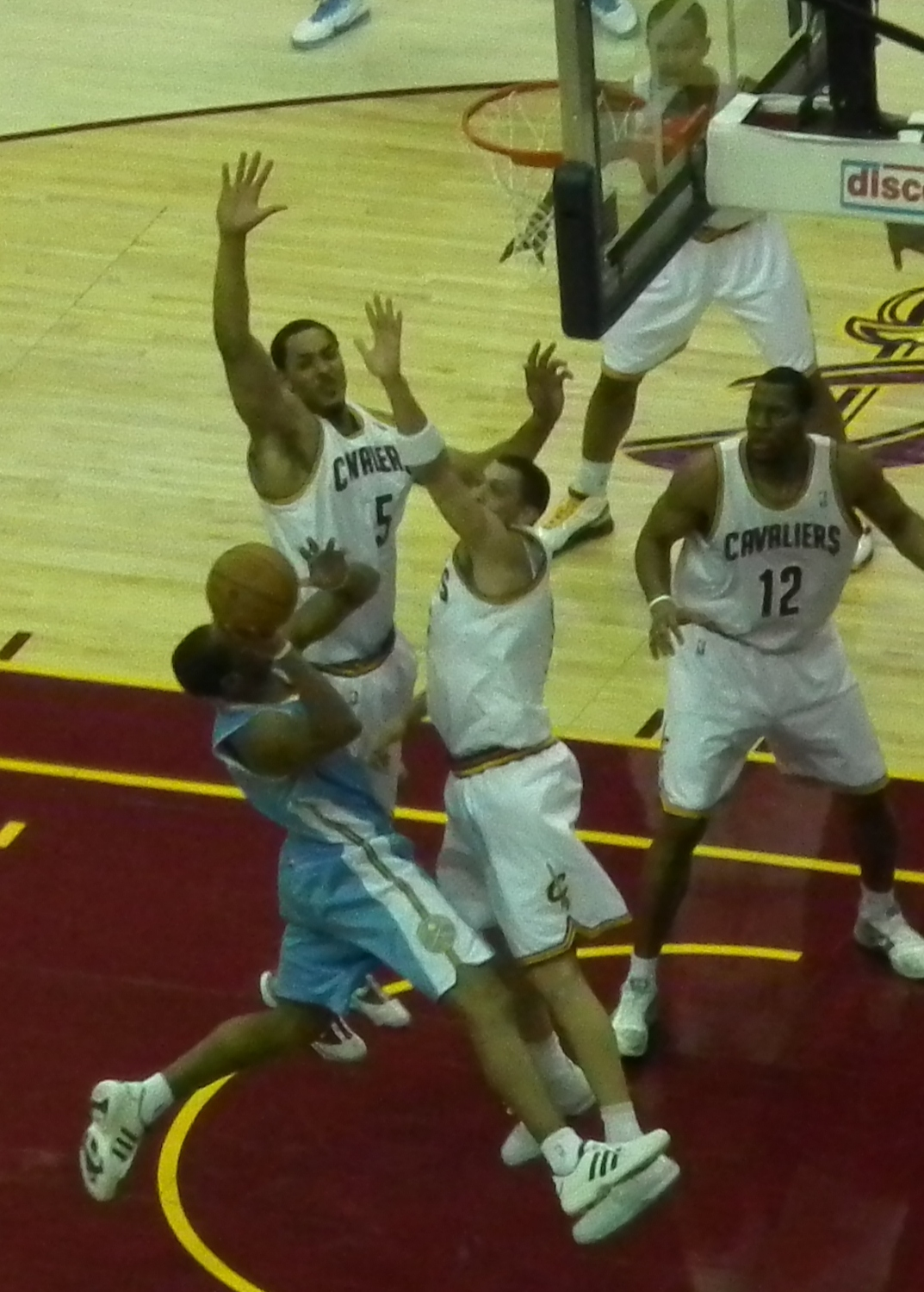
Graham (#12) with the Cavaliers in January 2011

On September 26, 2009, Graham signed with the Denver Nuggets. On July 30, 2010, Graham signed with the Cleveland Cavaliers. On December 9, 2011, prior to the start of the 2011–12 training camp period, Graham was waived by the Cavaliers.

=== D-League and Puerto Rico (2012–2013) ===
On March 19, 2012, Graham was acquired by the Erie BayHawks of the NBA Development League.

On May 4, 2012, Graham signed with Mets de Guaynabo of the Baloncesto Superior Nacional.

In February 2013, Graham joined Capitanes de Arecibo. On April 15, 2013, he parted ways with Arecibo. Two days later, he signed with Mets de Guaynabo, returning to the team for a second stint.

== NBA career statistics ==
Legend
GP	Games played	GS	Games started	MPG	Minutes per game
FG%	Field goal percentage	3P%	3-point field goal percentage	FT%	Free throw percentage
RPG	Rebounds per game	APG	Assists per game	SPG	Steals per game
BPG	Blocks per game	PPG	Points per game	**Bold**	Career high

=== Regular season ===
Year	Team	GP	GS	MPG	FG%	3P%	FT%	RPG	APG	SPG	BPG	PPG
2005–06	Toronto	**80**	**24**	**19.8**	.478	.333	.812	3.1	**.8**	**.5**	**.2**	6.7
2006–07	Toronto	79	21	16.7	.495	.290	.840	3.1	.6	.4	.1	6.4
2007–08	Toronto	38	3	8.7	.434	**.667**	**.844**	1.8	.4	.1	.0	3.6
2008–09	Toronto	78	10	**19.8**	.481	.188	.825	**3.7**	.6	.4	**.2**	**7.7**
2009–10	Denver	63	18	12.0	**.520**	.154	.740	2.0	.3	.4	.1	4.2
2010–11	Cleveland	39	8	15.0	.458	.300	.806	2.2	.5	.2	**.2**	5.2
Career		377	84	16.2	.483	.300	.815	2.8	.5	.4	.1	5.9

=== Playoffs ===
Year	Team	GP	GS	MPG	FG%	3P%	FT%	RPG	APG	SPG	BPG	PPG
2007	Toronto	**6**	**3**	**18.2**	.286	.000	**.800**	**3.3**	**.3**	**.7**	.0	2.7
2008	Toronto	2	0	1.0	.000	.000	.000	.0	.0	.0	.0	.0
2010	Denver	4	0	7.3	**.588**	**.333**	.600	2.5	.0	.5	**.3**	**6.0**
Career		12	3	11.7	.400	.200	.700	2.5	.2	.5	.1	3.3

== Personal ==
Graham's twin brother, Stephen, also played in the NBA. His father, Joe Graham, is a former Navy airman.
