= 2011–12 Dallas Mavericks season =

NBA professional basketball team season

- Head coach: Rick Carlisle
- President: Donnie Nelson
- General manager: Donnie Nelson
- Owner: Mark Cuban
- Arena: American Airlines Center

Results
- Record: 36–30 (.545)
- Place: Division: 3rd (Southwest); Conference: 7th (Western)
- Playoff finish: First Round (lost to Thunder 0–4)
- Stats at Basketball Reference

Local media
- Television: FS Southwest
- Radio: KESN

The 2011–12 Dallas Mavericks season was the 32nd season of the franchise in the National Basketball Association (NBA). The Mavericks entered the season as the defending NBA champions, having defeated the Miami Heat in six games in the 2011 NBA Finals. They were attempting to win back-to-back NBA Finals, but were swept in the first round of the NBA Playoffs by the Oklahoma City Thunder (the team that the Mavericks defeated in last year's Western Conference finals in five games) in four games. The Thunder would go on to lose to the Heat in the Finals in five games.

The season officially began once NBA players and owners signed a new collective bargaining agreement to end the 2011 NBA lockout.

== Key dates ==
- June 23: The 2011 NBA draft took place at Prudential Center in Newark, New Jersey.

== Draft picks ==
Round	Pick	Player	Position	Nationality	College/Team
1	26	Jordan Hamilton (traded to Denver)	F	United States	Texas

At the Draft night the Mavs acquired Rudy Fernández for their 26th pick, Jordan Hamilton, who was sent to Denver.

== Offseason ==
Following their championship-winning 2010–2011 season, the Mavericks entered the offseason with six free agents; only one of those six players returned to play with the team in 2011–2012. Starting center Tyson Chandler was traded to the New York Knicks in a three-team sign-and-trade deal; the Mavericks received guard Andy Rautins in return(in addition to a 2012 second-round pick and a traded player exception) and waived him shortly thereafter. Forward Caron Butler signed a three-year deal worth $24 million with the Los Angeles Clippers. On December 14, reserve guard José Juan Barea announced that he would join the Minnesota Timberwolves. On December 19, reserve forward Peja Stojaković announced his retirement. Guard DeShawn Stevenson signed a one-year deal with New Jersey. Backup forward Brian Cardinal re-signed with the Mavs.

The Mavericks acquired several new players during the offseason. On December 9, the Mavs signed power forward Brandan Wright. Vince Carter signed a contract on December 11, while Lamar Odom came to the Mavs through a trade with the Los Angeles Lakers. Drew Neitzel and Jerome Randle were signed on December 11; Neitzel and Randle were both waived on December 21 after playing in the D-League for the Texas Legends. The Mavs signed guard Delonte West on December 12 to a one-year deal. The Mavericks traded Rudy Fernández and Corey Brewer to the Denver Nuggets for a future second-round pick (and a traded player exception). The Mavericks signed Sean Williams on December 21 to a two-year deal. Free agent Yi Jianlian was signed on January 6 to a one-year deal.

== Season recap ==
=== Preseason ===
The Mavericks lost their first preseason game to the Oklahoma City Thunder, with both Dirk Nowitzki and Jason Kidd sitting the game out. With Kidd and Nowitzki back in the lineup but without Jason Terry (illness), Vince Carter and Delonte West they also lost the second and last preseason matchup against the Thunder. The Mavericks ended the preseason with a 0–2 record.

=== Regular season ===
The 2011–12 NBA season began on December 25, 2011, and ended on April 26, 2012. Due to a lockout agreement, the season consisted of 66 games, rather than the standard 82. The Mavericks entered the season as defending champions. At the conclusion of the season, their record consisted of 36 wins and 30 losses. They finished seventh in the Western Conference and third in the Southwest Division.

=== Playoffs ===
The Mavericks opened their series against Oklahoma City Thunder on the first day of the playoffs. The game was close throughout and the Mavs took the lead by seven with 2 minutes to go. Dirk Nowitzki turned the ball over several times in the crucial stretch and the team stayed scoreless on four straight possessions. With nine seconds to go, the Mavs had a one-point lead, when Kevin Durant hit a shot that bounced a couple of times on the rim and backboard and fell through with 1.5 seconds to go. Shawn Marion's attempt for a half court shot came too late and the Thunder took Game 1. Game 2 was closeout again, even though the Mavs were down by 16 in the first half. They came back and took the lead in the third quarter. The fourth quarter was much of a freethrow contest, James Harden made all of his late in the game and both, Nowitzki and Jason Terry missed his threes. Terry had two tries to send it to overtime, but missed. Thunder were up 2–0. The Thunder took a commanding 3–0 lead after their blowout win in Game 3. Despite having a 13-point lead going into the fourth quarter the Mavs lost by six in Game 4 and were swept.

== Roster ==
2011–12 Dallas Mavericks roster
Players

Pos.	No.	Player	Height	Weight	DOB	From
G/F	4	Kelenna Azubuike	6 ft 5 in (1.96 m)	215 lb (98 kg)	1983–12–16	Kentucky
G	3	Rodrigue Beaubois	6 ft 2 in (1.88 m)	185 lb (84 kg)	1988–02–24	France
F	35	Brian Cardinal	6 ft 8 in (2.03 m)	240 lb (109 kg)	1977–05–02	Purdue
G/F	25	Vince Carter	6 ft 6 in (1.98 m)	220 lb (100 kg)	1977–01–26	North Carolina
C	33	Brendan Haywood	7 ft 0 in (2.13 m)	263 lb (119 kg)	1979–11–27	North Carolina
G	20	Dominique Jones	6 ft 4 in (1.93 m)	215 lb (98 kg)	1988–10–15	South Florida
G	2	Jason Kidd	6 ft 4 in (1.93 m)	210 lb (95 kg)	1973–03–23	California
C	28	Ian Mahinmi	6 ft 11 in (2.11 m)	230 lb (104 kg)	1986–11–05	France
F	0	Shawn Marion	6 ft 7 in (2.01 m)	228 lb (103 kg)	1978–05–07	UNLV
F	41	Dirk Nowitzki	7 ft 0 in (2.13 m)	245 lb (111 kg)	1978–06–19	Germany
F	7	Lamar Odom	6 ft 10 in (2.08 m)	230 lb (104 kg)	1979–11–06	Rhode Island
G	31	Jason Terry	6 ft 2 in (1.88 m)	180 lb (82 kg)	1977–09–15	Arizona
G	13	Delonte West	6 ft 3 in (1.91 m)	180 lb (82 kg)	1983–07–26	Saint Joseph's
F	34	Brandan Wright	6 ft 10 in (2.08 m)	210 lb (95 kg)	1987–10–05	North Carolina
F	9	Jianlian Yi	7 ft 0 in (2.13 m)	250 lb (113 kg)	1987–10–27	China

Coaches
Head coach
- Rick Carlisle
Assistant(s)
- Darrell Armstrong
- Tony Brown
- Monte Mathis
- Terry Stotts

Legend
- (DP) Unsigned draft pick
- (FA) Free agent
- (S) Suspended
- (DL) On assignment to D-League affiliate
- Injured

Roster
Updated: 2012–03–23

== Pre-season ==
2011 pre-season game log
Pre-season: 0–2 (home: 0–1; road: 0–1)

Game	Date	Team	Score	High points	High rebounds	High assists	Location Attendance	Record
1	December 18	Oklahoma City	L 92–106	Rodrigue Beaubois; Dominique Jones (17)	Lamar Odom (7)	Dominique Jones (9)	American Airlines Center; 19,287	0–1
2	December 20	@ Oklahoma City	L 83–87	Jerome Randle (17)	Ian Mahinmi (9)	Dominique Jones; Brian Cardinal (4)	Chesapeake Energy Arena; 18,203	0–2

2011–12 season schedule

== Regular season ==
=== Standings ===
Southwest Division	W	L	PCT	GB	Home	Road	Div	GP
c-San Antonio Spurs	50	16	.758	–	28‍–‍5	22‍–‍11	12–4	66
x-Memphis Grizzlies	41	25	.621	9.0	26‍–‍7	15‍–‍18	7–8	66
x-Dallas Mavericks	36	30	.545	14.0	23‍–‍10	13‍–‍20	8–5	66
Houston Rockets	34	32	.515	16.0	22‍–‍11	12‍–‍21	6–8	66
New Orleans Hornets	21	45	.318	29.0	11‍–‍22	10‍–‍23	3–11	66

Western Conference
#	Team	W	L	PCT	GB	GP
1	c-San Antonio Spurs *	50	16	.758	–	66
2	y-Oklahoma City Thunder *	47	19	.712	3.0	66
3	y-Los Angeles Lakers *	41	25	.621	9.0	66
4	x-Memphis Grizzlies	41	25	.621	9.0	66
5	x-Los Angeles Clippers	40	26	.606	10.0	66
6	x-Denver Nuggets	38	28	.576	12.0	66
7	x-Dallas Mavericks	36	30	.545	14.0	66
8	x-Utah Jazz	36	30	.545	14.0	66
9	Houston Rockets	34	32	.515	16.0	66
10	Phoenix Suns	33	33	.500	17.0	66
11	Portland Trail Blazers	28	38	.424	22.0	66
12	Minnesota Timberwolves	26	40	.394	24.0	66
13	Golden State Warriors	23	43	.348	27.0	66
14	Sacramento Kings	22	44	.333	28.0	66
15	New Orleans Hornets	21	45	.318	29.0	66

=== Schedule ===
2011–12 game log
Total: 36–30 (home: 23–10; road: 13–20)
December: 1–3 (home: 1–2; road: 0–1)

Game	Date	Team	Score	High points	High rebounds	High assists	Location Attendance	Record
1	December 25	Miami	L 94–105	Jason Terry (23)	Shawn Marion (6)	seven players (3)	American Airlines Center; 20,421	0–1
2	December 26	Denver	L 93–115	Dirk Nowitzki (20)	Lamar Odom (7)	three players (4)	American Airlines Center; 20,408	0–2
3	December 29	@ Oklahoma City	L 102–104	Dirk Nowitzki (29)	Dirk Nowitzki (10)	Jason Terry (9)	Chesapeake Energy Arena; 18,203	0–3
4	December 30	Toronto	W 99–86	Ian Mahinmi (19)	Brendan Haywood (9)	Jason Kidd (6)	American Airlines Center; 20,307	1–3

January : 13–5 (home: 8–1; road: 5–4)

Game	Date	Team	Score	High points	High rebounds	High assists	Location Attendance	Record
5	January 1	@ Minnesota	L 82–99	Dirk Nowitzki (21)	Shawn Marion (6)	Jason Kidd (5)	Target Center; 15,115	1–4
6	January 2	Oklahoma City	W 100–87	Dirk Nowitzki (26)	Ian Mahinmi (9)	Jason Kidd (9)	American Airlines Center; 20,108	2–4
7	January 4	Phoenix	W 98–89	Dirk Nowitzki (20)	Brendan Haywood (12)	Dirk Nowitzki (7)	American Airlines Center; 19,885	3–4
8	January 5	@ San Antonio	L 71–93	Jason Terry (12)	Ian Mahinmi (9)	Jason Kidd; Delonte West (3)	AT&T Center; 18,581	3–5
9	January 7	New Orleans	W 96–81	Vince Carter; Ian Mahinmi (13)	Ian Mahinmi (7)	three players (4)	American Airlines Center; 20,409	4–5
10	January 10	@ Detroit	W 100–86	Dirk Nowitzki (18)	Dirk Nowitzki; Lamar Odom (7)	Delonte West (10)	The Palace of Auburn Hills; 10,073	5–5
11	January 11	@ Boston	W 90–85	Jason Terry (18)	Brendan Haywood (11)	Dirk Nowitzki (4)	TD Garden; 18,624	6–5
12	January 13	Milwaukee	W 102–76	Jason Terry (17)	three players (6)	Delonte West (4)	American Airlines Center; 20,112	7–5
13	January 14	Sacramento	W 99–60	Jason Terry (21)	Shawn Marion (8)	Jason Kidd (6)	American Airlines Center; 20,313	8–5
14	January 16	@ L.A. Lakers	L 70–73	Dirk Nowitzki (21)	Ian Mahinmi (10)	Jason Terry (7)	Staples Center; 18,997	8–6
15	January 18	@ L.A. Clippers	L 89–91	Dirk Nowitzki; Delonte West (17)	Shawn Marion (10)	Jason Kidd (10)	Staples Center; 19,252	8–7
16	January 19	@ Utah	W 94–91	Shawn Marion (22)	Shawn Marion (7)	Jason Kidd (11)	EnergySolutions Arena; 19,911	9–7
17	January 21	@ New Orleans	W 83–81	Lamar Odom; Delonte West (22)	Shawn Marion (12)	Delonte West (6)	New Orleans Arena; 15,471	10–7
18	January 23	Phoenix	W 93–87	Shawn Marion (29)	Ian Mahinmi (9)	Jason Kidd; Lamar Odom (6)	American Airlines Center; 19,944	11–7
19	January 25	Minnesota	L 90–105	Jason Terry (17)	Brendan Haywood (10)	Jason Kidd (7)	American Airlines Center; 20,150	11–8
20	January 27	Utah	W 116–101	Rodrigue Beaubois (22)	Brendan Haywood (12)	Rodrigue Beaubois (7)	American Airlines Center; 20,096	12–8
21	January 29	San Antonio	W 101–100 (OT)	Jason Terry (34)	Dirk Nowitzki (13)	Rodrigue Beaubois (7)	American Airlines Center; 20,262	13–8
22	January 30	@ Phoenix	W 122–99	Delonte West (25)	Brendan Haywood (8)	Rodrigue Beaubois (7)	US Airways Center; 13,132	14–8

February : 7–7 (home: 4–4; road: 3–3)

Game	Date	Team	Score	High points	High rebounds	High assists	Location Attendance	Record
23	February 1	Oklahoma City	L 86–95	Jason Terry (25)	Shawn Marion (10)	Rodrigue Beaubois (4)	American Airlines Center; 20,316	14–9
24	February 3	Indiana	L 87–98	Dirk Nowitzki (30)	Shawn Marion; Dirk Nowitzki (7)	Vince Carter (5)	American Airlines Center; 20,146	14–10
25	February 4	@ Cleveland	L 88–91	Dirk Nowitzki (24)	Dirk Nowitzki; Brandan Wright (8)	Delonte West (7)	Quicken Loans Arena; 17,443	14–11
26	February 8	@ Denver	W 105–95	Dirk Nowitzki (25)	Dirk Nowitzki (9)	Vince Carter (8)	Pepsi Center; 15,970	15–11
27	February 10	@ Minnesota	W 104–97	Dirk Nowitzki (33)	Shawn Marion (8)	Jason Kidd (10)	Target Center; 17,119	16–11
28	February 11	Portland	W 97–94	Dirk Nowitzki (20)	Shawn Marion (12)	Jason Kidd (8)	American Airlines Center; 20,457	17–11
29	February 13	L.A. Clippers	W 96–92	Dirk Nowitzki (22)	Brendan Haywood (9)	Jason Kidd (4)	American Airlines Center; 20,436	18–11
30	February 15	Denver	W 102–84	Shawn Marion (16)	Shawn Marion (10)	Shawn Marion; Dominique Jones (6)	American Airlines Center; 20,075	19–11
31	February 17	@ Philadelphia	W 82–75	Dirk Nowitzki (28)	Dirk Nowitzki (12)	Jason Kidd (8)	Wells Fargo Center; 19,369	20–11
32	February 19	@ New York	L 97–104	Dirk Nowitzki (34)	Shawn Marion; Jason Terry (7)	Jason Terry (6)	Madison Square Garden; 19,763	20–12
33	February 20	Boston	W 89–73	Dirk Nowitzki (26)	Dirk Nowitzki (16)	Jason Kidd (8)	American Airlines Center; 20,364	21–12
34	February 22	L.A. Lakers	L 91–96	Dirk Nowitzki (25)	Dirk Nowitzki (12)	Shawn Marion; Jason Terry (5)	American Airlines Center; 20,577	21–13
All-Star Break
35	February 28	New Jersey	L 92–93	Dirk Nowitzki (24)	Brendan Haywood; Dirk Nowitzki (10)	Jason Kidd (8)	American Airlines Center; 20,170	21–14
36	February 29	@ Memphis	L 85–96	Jason Terry (18)	Shawn Marion (8)	Jason Terry (5)	FedExForum; 17,023	21–15

March : 9–8 (home: 6–1; road: 3–7)

Game	Date	Team	Score	High points	High rebounds	High assists	Location Attendance	Record
37	March 2	@ New Orleans	L 92–97	Rodrigue Beaubois (25)	Dirk Nowitzki (9)	Jason Kidd (6)	New Orleans Arena; 15,568	21–16
38	March 3	Utah	W 102–96	Dirk Nowitzki (40)	Ian Mahinmi (8)	Jason Kidd (8)	American Airlines Center; 20,560	22–16
39	March 5	@ Oklahoma City	L 91–95	Dirk Nowitzki (27)	Shawn Marion (10)	Jason Terry (7)	Chesapeake Energy Arena; 18,203	22–17
40	March 6	New York	W 95–85	Dirk Nowitzki (28)	Shawn Marion (9)	Jason Kidd (6)	American Airlines Center; 20,605	23–17
41	March 8	@ Phoenix	L 94–96	Vince Carter; Dirk Nowitzki (18)	Shawn Marion (8)	Vince Carter (4)	US Airways Center; 15,498	23–18
42	March 9	@ Sacramento	L 97–110	Jason Terry (23)	Dirk Nowitzki (9)	Jason Kidd; Rodrigue Beaubois (4)	Power Balance Pavilion; 16,857	23–19
43	March 10	@ Golden State	L 87–111	Dirk Nowitzki (22)	Ian Mahinmi (9)	Dominique Jones; Jason Terry (5)	Oracle Arena; 19,596	23–20
44	March 13	Washington	W 107–98	Dirk Nowitzki (27)	Shawn Marion (13)	three players (4)	American Airlines Center; 20,319	24–20
45	March 15	Charlotte	W 101–96	Dirk Nowitzki (27)	Brendan Haywood (8)	Dirk Nowitzki (5)	American Airlines Center; 20,507	25–20
46	March 17	San Antonio	W 106–99	Dirk Nowitzki (27)	Brandan Wright (9)	Jason Kidd (10)	American Airlines Center; 20,528	26–20
47	March 19	@ Denver	W 112–95	Dirk Nowitzki (33)	Dirk Nowitzki (11)	Jason Kidd (10)	Pepsi Center; 20,528	27–20
48	March 21	L.A. Lakers	L 93–109	Dirk Nowitzki (26)	Dirk Nowitzki (10)	Rodrigue Beaubois (5)	American Airlines Center; 20,664	27–21
49	March 23	@ San Antonio	L 87–104	Jason Terry (18)	Ian Mahinmi (10)	Rodrigue Beaubois (5)	AT&T Center; 18,581	27–22
50	March 24	@ Houston	W 101–99	Dirk Nowitzki (31)	Shawn Marion (15)	Jason Kidd (4)	Toyota Center; 18,193	28–22
51	March 27	Houston	W 90–81	Dirk Nowitzki (21)	Shawn Marion (11)	Rodrigue Beaubois (5)	American Airlines Center; 20,359	29–22
52	March 29	@ Miami	L 85–106	Dirk Nowitzki (21)	Jason Kidd; Dirk Nowitzki (6)	Jason Kidd; Jason Terry (4)	American Airlines Arena; 20,096	29–23
53	March 30	@ Orlando	W 100–98	Dirk Nowitzki (28)	Shawn Marion (9)	Jason Kidd (6)	Amway Center; 18,951	30–23

April : 6–7 (home: 4–2; road: 2–5)

Game	Date	Team	Score	High points	High rebounds	High assists	Location Attendance	Record
54	April 2	L.A. Clippers	L 74–95	Dirk Nowitzki (19)	Shawn Marion (9)	Delonte West; Jason Terry (4)	American Airlines Center; 20,479	30–24
55	April 4	Memphis	W 95–85	Dirk Nowitzki (23)	Ian Mahinmi; Dirk Nowitzki (10)	Rodrigue Beaubois (5)	American Airlines Center; 20,233	31–24
56	April 6	Portland	L 97–99	Dirk Nowitzki (23)	Dirk Nowitzki (14)	three players (5)	American Airlines Center; 20,544	31–25
57	April 7	@ Memphis	L 89–94	Dirk Nowitzki (17)	Shawn Marion (11)	Jason Terry (8)	FedExForum; 18,119	31–26
58	April 10	Sacramento	W 110–100	Dirk Nowitzki; Rodrigue Beaubois (15)	Shawn Marion (14)	Jason Kidd (7)	American Airlines Center; 20,241	32–26
59	April 12	@ Golden State	W 113–102	Dirk Nowitzki (27)	Shawn Marion (12)	Jason Kidd (12)	Oracle Arena; 17,929	33–26
60	April 13	@ Portland	W 97–94	Dirk Nowitzki (24)	Shawn Marion (14)	Delonte West (7)	Rose Garden; 17,929	34–26
61	April 15	@ L.A. Lakers	L 108–112	Dirk Nowitzki (24)	Dirk Nowitzki (14)	Jason Kidd (7)	Staples Center; 18,997	34–27
62	April 16	@ Utah	L 121–123	Dirk Nowitzki (40)	Vince Carter (12)	Jason Kidd; Dirk Nowitzki (6)	EnergySolutions Arena; 19,363	34–28
63	April 18	Houston	W 117–110	Dirk Nowitzki (35)	Shawn Marion (6)	Jason Kidd (8)	American Airlines Center; 20,508	35–28
64	April 20	Golden State	W 104–94	Vince Carter (21)	Vince Carter; Ian Mahinmi (9)	three players (4)	American Airlines Center; 20,547	36–28
65	April 21	@ Chicago	L 83–93	Dirk Nowitzki (17)	Dirk Nowitzki; Brandan Wright (7)	Rodrigue Beaubois (5)	United Center; 20,547	36–29
66	April 26	@ Atlanta	L 89–106	Dirk Nowitzki (22)	Shawn Marion (8)	Rodrigue Beaubois (6)	Philips Arena; 14,595	36–30

2011–12 season schedule

== Playoffs ==
=== Game log ===
2012 playoff game log
Total: 0–4 (home: 0–2; road: 0–2)
First Round: 0–4 (home: 0–2; road: 0–2)

Game	Date	Team	Score	High points	High rebounds	High assists	Location Attendance	Series
1	April 28	@ Oklahoma City	L 98–99	Dirk Nowitzki (25)	Shawn Marion (8)	Jason Kidd; Jason Terry (5)	Chesapeake Energy Arena; 18,203	0–1
2	April 30	@ Oklahoma City	L 99–102	Dirk Nowitzki (31)	Shawn Marion (8)	Jason Kidd (7)	Chesapeake Energy Arena; 18,203	0–2
3	May 3	Oklahoma City	L 79–95	Dirk Nowitzki (17)	Shawn Marion (10)	Jason Terry (6)	American Airlines Center; 20,640	0–3
4	May 5	Oklahoma City	L 97–103	Dirk Nowitzki (34)	Vince Carter (8)	Jason Kidd (8)	American Airlines Center; 20,533	0–4

2012 playoff schedule

== Player statistics ==
=== Regular season ===
Player	POS	GP	GS	MP	REB	AST	STL	BLK	PTS	MPG	RPG	APG	SPG	BPG	PPG
Shawn Marion	SF	63	63	1,919	465	132	67	36	670	30.5	7.4	2.1	1.1	.6	10.6
Jason Terry	SG	63	1	2,000	149	226	73	11	950	31.7	2.4	3.6	1.2	.2	15.1
Dirk Nowitzki	PF	62	62	2,079	418	136	42	30	1,342	33.5	6.7	2.2	.7	.5	21.6
Vince Carter	SG	61	40	1,542	205	139	56	25	615	25.3	3.4	2.3	.9	.4	10.1
Ian Mahinmi	C	61	12	1,139	289	12	38	31	354	18.7	4.7	.2	.6	.5	5.8
Brendan Haywood	C	54	54	1,146	324	19	24	54	281	21.2	6.0	.4	.4	1.0	5.2
Rodrigue Beaubois	PG	53	12	1,151	151	152	56	28	472	21.7	2.8	2.9	1.1	.5	8.9
Lamar Odom	SF	50	4	1,027	208	83	20	18	332	20.5	4.2	1.7	.4	.4	6.6
Brandan Wright	C	49	0	791	174	13	22	63	340	16.1	3.6	.3	.4	1.3	6.9
Jason Kidd	PG	48	48	1,379	198	264	82	10	299	28.7	4.1	5.5	1.7	.2	6.2
Delonte West	PG	44	33	1,060	101	139	58	11	421	24.1	2.3	3.2	1.3	.3	9.6
Brian Cardinal	SF	44	0	277	34	16	8	2	43	6.3	.8	.4	.2	.0	1.0
Dominique Jones	SG	33	1	268	44	42	10	5	88	8.1	1.3	1.3	.3	.2	2.7
Yi Jianlian	PF	30	0	203	49	5	7	8	79	6.8	1.6	.2	.2	.3	2.6
Sean Williams^{†}	C	8	0	65	13	2	1	5	29	8.1	1.6	.3	.1	.6	3.6
Kelenna Azubuike	SG	3	0	18	0	0	1	0	7	6.0	.0	.0	.3	.0	2.3

- ^{†} Denotes player spent time with another team in the season. Stats reflect time with the Mavericks only.

=== Playoffs ===
Player	POS	GP	GS	MP	REB	AST	STL	BLK	PTS	MPG	RPG	APG	SPG	BPG	PPG
Dirk Nowitzki	PF	4	4	154	25	7	3	0	107	38.5	6.3	1.8	.8	.0	26.8
Jason Kidd	PG	4	4	144	24	24	12	1	46	36.0	6.0	6.0	3.0	.3	11.5
Shawn Marion	SF	4	4	140	32	4	1	5	47	35.0	8.0	1.0	.3	1.3	11.8
Brendan Haywood	C	4	4	61	13	1	1	2	13	15.3	3.3	.3	.3	.5	3.3
Delonte West	PG	4	3	88	7	8	3	0	30	22.0	1.8	2.0	.8	.0	7.5
Jason Terry	SG	4	1	139	9	15	1	0	55	34.8	2.3	3.8	.3	.0	13.8
Vince Carter	SG	4	0	107	22	1	5	2	33	26.8	5.5	.3	1.3	.5	8.3
Ian Mahinmi	C	4	0	70	18	0	3	3	29	17.5	4.5	.0	.8	.8	7.3
Brandan Wright	C	4	0	27	5	0	1	1	5	6.8	1.3	.0	.3	.3	1.3
Rodrigue Beaubois	PG	2	0	12	1	2	0	0	0	6.0	.5	1.0	.0	.0	.0
Brian Cardinal	SF	2	0	9	3	0	0	0	3	4.5	1.5	.0	.0	.0	1.5
Kelenna Azubuike	SG	1	0	5	1	0	1	0	3	5.0	1.0	.0	1.0	.0	3.0
Yi Jianlian	PF	1	0	5	2	0	1	0	2	5.0	2.0	.0	1.0	.0	2.0

== Awards, records and milestones ==
=== All-Star ===
- Dirk Nowitzki was voted to his 11th NBA All-Star Game.

=== Milestones ===
- On January 1, Brendan Haywood recorded his 1,000th block during a game against the Minnesota Timberwolves.
- On January 2, Dirk Nowitzki recorded his 8,000th made field goal during a game against the Oklahoma City Thunder.
- On January 4, Dirk Nowitzki played in his 1,000th game against the Phoenix Suns.
- On January 13, Dirk Nowitzki recorded his 23,000th point during a game against the Milwaukee Bucks.
- On January 17, Vince Carter recorded his 20,000th point during a game against the New York Knicks.
- On February 20, Dirk Nowitzki recorded his 1,000th block during a game against the Boston Celtics.
- On February 20, Dirk Nowitzki moved up to Number 20 on the all-time scoring list during a game against the Boston Celtics.
- On February 20, Jason Kidd moved up to Number two on the all time steals list during a game against the Boston Celtics.
- On March 10, Jason Terry played in his 1,000th game against the Golden State Warriors.
- On April 4, Vince Carter recorded his 21,000th point during a game against the Memphis Grizzlies.
- On April 4, Jason Terry moved up to Number five on the all time 3-point scoring leaders list during a game against the Memphis Grizzlies.
- On April 15, Dirk Nowitzki recorded his 24,000th point during a game against the Los Angeles Lakers.

== Injuries ==
Shawn Marion fractured his left little finger during the opening game against the Miami Heat but did not miss a game. Marion was ill but played against the Phoenix Suns. In a game against San Antonio, Jason Kidd was subbed out with under a minute to go in the first quarter and went straight into the Mavs' locker room and was diagnosed with a lower back injury and did not return to the game. He missed the game at New Orleans and two more games. He then missed the game at home against Milwaukee before returning versus the Sacramento Kings. Vince Carter injured his left foot, x-rays showed that it was a sprain. He missed the next four games. He returned against Utah. Dirk Nowitzki sat four games because of a sore knee. Delonte West was out against Utah due to a harmstring injury. Kidd left the Game versus Utah due to a strain calf and missed more than a week. Marion injured his knee against Oklahoma but did not miss a game. He, Lamar Odom and Brendan Haywood, the latter two missed the game against Oklahoma, returned to play against Indiana. Jason Terry and Rodrigue Beaubois were out against the Denver Nuggets. Terry joined the team at New York. West went out against the Nuggets before halftime and had fractured, dislocated finger and missed 4–6 weeks. Nowitzki left the game against Memphis with a back injury and was listed day-to-day but returned for the next game. Brandan Wright missed the game against Utah due to a concussion. Haywood sprained his ankle at Oklahoma. He sprained his knee against Charlotte and missed five games. Marion missed three games with a sore left knee. Kidd and Odom both missed the Game against the Clippers, Kidd with a groin injury which kept him out for a week and Odom was ill. Odom returned against Memphis, one game later. Beaubois missed the games at the Los Angeles Lakers and Jazz due to a right calf strain. He returned the next game against Houston. He dislocated his finger against Chicago but was able to return to the game.

== Transactions ==
=== Trades ===
December 10, 2011
To Dallas Mavericks

- Andy Rautins and 2012 second-round pick, TPE
To New York Knicks

- Tyson Chandler
December 11, 2011
To Dallas Mavericks

- Lamar Odom
To Los Angeles Lakers

- 2012 first-round pick, TPE
December 12, 2011
To Dallas Mavericks

- 2016 Second-round pick, TPE
To Denver Nuggets

- Rudy Fernández, Corey Brewer

=== Free agents ===
==== Additions ====
Player	Signed	Former Team
Brandan Wright	Signed 1-year contract worth $885,120	New Jersey Nets
Brian Cardinal	Signed 1-year contract worth $1.3 million	Dallas Mavericks
Vince Carter	Signed 3-year contract worth $9 million (MLE)	Phoenix Suns
Delonte West	Signed 1-year contract worth $1.1 million	Boston Celtics
Sean Williams	Signed 1-year contract worth $885,120	(Israel) Maccabi Haifa B.C.
Yi Jianlian	Signed 1-year contract worth $885,120	Washington Wizards / (China) Guangdong Winnerway Southern Tigers
Kelenna Azubuike	Signed 1-year contract	New York Knicks

a: Yi's last NBA team that he played with was the Washington Wizards, but due to the 2011 NBA lockout, Yi decided to play for Guangdong in the CBA.

==== Subtractions ====
Player	Reason Left	New Team
Caron Butler	Signed 3-year contract worth $24 million	Los Angeles Clippers
DeShawn Stevenson	Signed 1-year contract worth $2.5 million	New Jersey Nets
José Juan Barea	Signed 4-year contract worth $19 million	Minnesota Timberwolves
Peja Stojaković	Retirement	Retired
Sean Williams	Waived	Boston Celtics
Lamar Odom	Away from team	

- On April 9, the Mavericks and Odom decided to part ways. Odom stays away from the team and will be listed as inactive until the season ends.
