= 2011–12 Los Angeles Lakers season =

NBA professional basketball team season

- Division champions
- Head coach: Mike Brown
- General manager: Mitch Kupchak
- Owners: Jerry Buss
- Arena: Staples Center

Results
- Record: 41–25 (.621)
- Place: Division: 1st (Pacific); Conference: 3rd (Western)
- Playoff finish: Conference semifinals (lost to Thunder 1–4)
- Stats at Basketball Reference

Local media
- Television: Home: FS West HD Away: KCAL 9 HD
- Radio: 710 ESPN

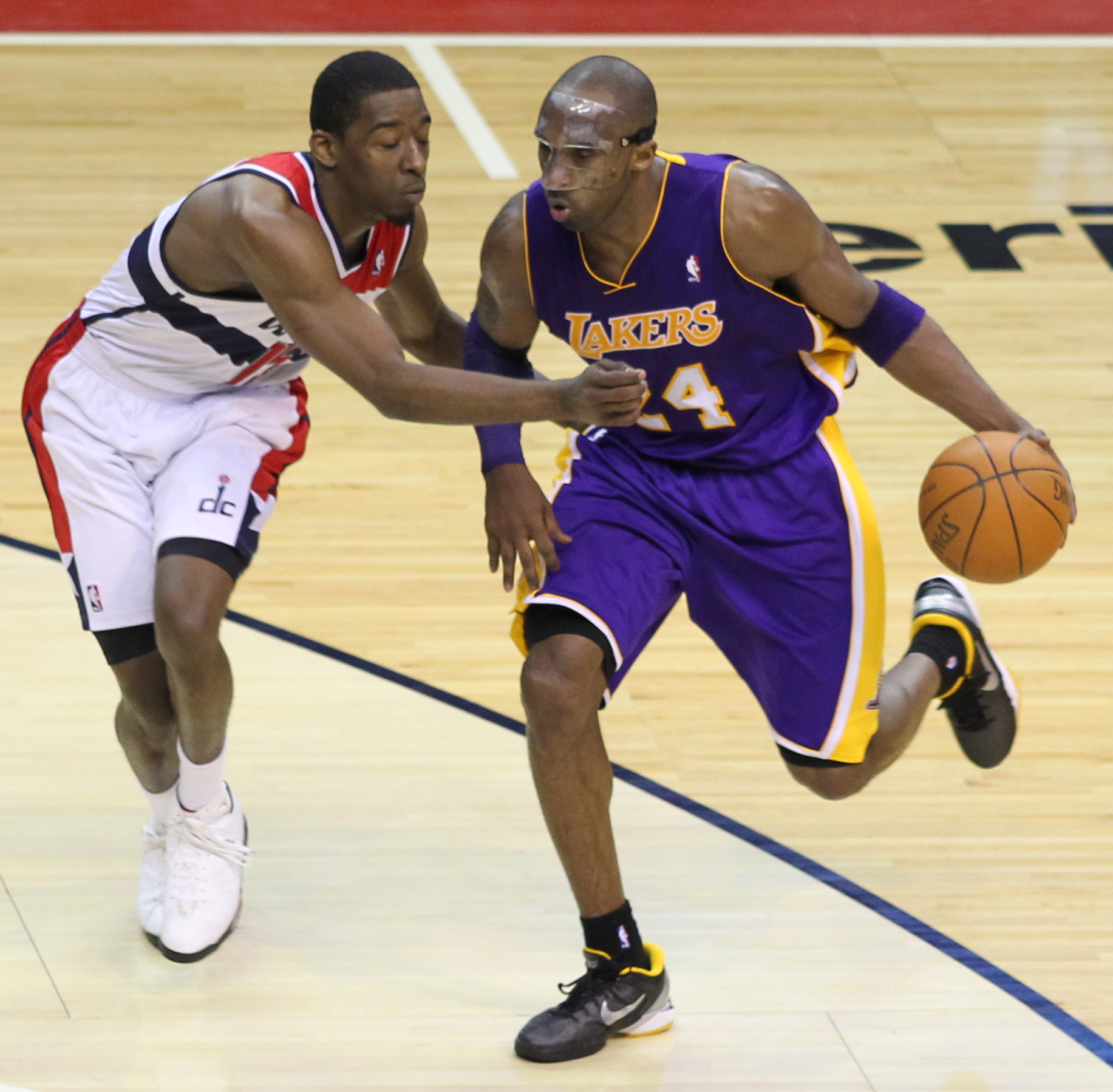
Jordan Crawford guarding Kobe Bryant, Lakers at Wizards on March 7, 2012

The 2011–12 Los Angeles Lakers season was the 64th season of the franchise, its 63rd season in the National Basketball Association (NBA), and its 52nd season in Los Angeles. For the first time since 2005, Phil Jackson did not return as the Lakers coach and was replaced by former Cleveland Cavaliers head coach Mike Brown. Following the 2011 NBA lockout each team only played 66 games instead of the usual 82. At midseason they traded longtime point guard Derek Fisher to the Houston Rockets for Jordan Hill and longtime forward Luke Walton to the Cleveland Cavaliers for Ramon Sessions.

The Lakers finished 41–25, roughly the equivalent of 51–31, winning the Pacific Division for the 33rd time. They finished the season as the No. 3 seed in the Western Conference. In the playoffs, they defeated the Denver Nuggets in seven games in the first round, but lost to the eventual Conference champion Oklahoma City Thunder 1–4 in the Western Conference semi-finals. This season marked the final career playoff appearance of Kobe Bryant and Andrew Bynum.

During this season, the Lakers were supposed to acquire Chris Paul from the New Orleans Hornets in a three-team deal that would send Lamar Odom, Goran Dragic, Luis Scola, Kevin Martin, and a 2012 1st-round pick to the Hornets and Pau Gasol to the Houston Rockets, but then-NBA Commissioner David Stern vetoed the trade. Following the season, Andrew Bynum was traded to the Philadelphia 76ers in a three-team deal.

== Key dates ==
- June 23: The 2011 NBA draft took place at Prudential Center in Newark, New Jersey.
- December 19: The Lakers play their first preseason season game against the Los Angeles Clippers.
- December 25: The Lakers play their first regular season game against the Chicago Bulls.
- April 13: The Lakers clinch a playoff berth.
- April 24: The Lakers win the Pacific Division.
- April 26: The Lakers play their final game of the season against the Sacramento Kings.

== Draft ==
Round	Pick	Player	Position(s)	Nationality	College / Club
2	41	Darius Morris	PG	United States	Michigan
2	58	Ater Majok	PF/C	Australia	Gold Coast Blaze (Australia)

== Roster ==
2011–12 Los Angeles Lakers roster
Players

Pos.	No.	Player	Height	Weight	DOB	From
SF	9	Matt Barnes	6 ft 7 in (2.01 m)	226 lb (103 kg)	1980-03-09	UCLA
PG	5	Steve Blake	6 ft 3 in (1.91 m)	172 lb (78 kg)	1980-02-26	Maryland
SG	24	Kobe Bryant	6 ft 6 in (1.98 m)	212 lb (96 kg)	1978-08-23	Lower Merion HS (PA)
C	17	Andrew Bynum	7 ft 0 in (2.13 m)	285 lb (129 kg)	1987-10-27	St. Joseph HS (NJ)
SG	3	Devin Ebanks	6 ft 9 in (2.06 m)	215 lb (98 kg)	1989-10-28	West Virginia
SF	88	Christian Eyenga	6 ft 7 in (2.01 m)	210 lb (95 kg)	1989-06-22	DR Congo
PF	16	Pau Gasol	7 ft 0 in (2.13 m)	250 lb (113 kg)	1980-07-06	Spain
SG	0	Andrew Goudelock	6 ft 3 in (1.91 m)	200 lb (91 kg)	1988-07-12	College of Charleston
C	27	Jordan Hill	6 ft 10 in (2.08 m)	235 lb (107 kg)	1987-07-27	Arizona
PF	6	Josh McRoberts	6 ft 10 in (2.08 m)	240 lb (109 kg)	1987-02-28	Duke
PG	1	Darius Morris	6 ft 4 in (1.93 m)	190 lb (86 kg)	1991-01-03	Michigan
PF	14	Troy Murphy	6 ft 11 in (2.11 m)	245 lb (111 kg)	1980-05-02	Notre Dame
PG	7	Ramon Sessions	6 ft 3 in (1.91 m)	190 lb (86 kg)	1986-04-11	Nevada
SF	15	Metta World Peace	6 ft 7 in (2.01 m)	260 lb (118 kg)	1979-11-13	St. John's

Coaches
Head coach
- Mike Brown
Assistant(s)
- John Kuester
- Chuck Person
- Quin Snyder
- Darvin Ham
- Ettore Messina

Legend
- (DP) Unsigned draft pick
- (FA) Free agent
- (S) Suspended
- (DL) On assignment to D-League affiliate
- Injured

Roster
Updated: April 26, 2012

== Season summary ==
=== Emergence of All Star Andrew Bynum ===
At the start of the season, Andrew Bynum did not play the first four games due to a suspension he earned in the final game of last year's playoff series against the Dallas Mavericks. In his first game back against the Denver Nuggets, he scored 29 points and grabbed 13 rebounds to help the Lakers to a 92–89 win. He had his first 20–20 game on January 3 against the Houston Rockets scoring 21 points and grabbing 22 rebounds. On April 11, 2012, Bynum further showed why he should be an all-star when against the San Antonio Spurs he recorded a career high 30 rebounds and helped the Lakers win the game 98–84. His domination on the glass was further shown when the Spurs only managed to grab 32 rebounds as a team. This was all done with Kobe Bryant, the Lakers best player sitting out. For the first time he was selected to play in the All Star game as the Western Conference's starting center. He was awarded Western Conference Player of the Week for the week of March 12 through 18. Bynum finish the season averaging a career high 18.7 points per game, 11.8 rebounds per game (NBA 3rd overall), and 35.2 minutes per game. His emergence as an all-star and career high numbers sparked a debate of whether Bynum was the best center in the league or Dwight Howard. Previously, Howard was seen widely as the undisputed best center in the league. Shaquille O'Neal was one of the main supporters of Bynum as the best center in the league.

== Post-season summary ==
=== Denver Nuggets ===
The Lakers were matched against the Denver Nuggets in the first round of the 2012 NBA Playoffs. They won the opening game 103–88 after Andrew Bynum had a triple-double with 10 points, 13 rebounds, and 10 blocked shots. The blocked shots broke Kareem Abdul-Jabbar's franchise record of nine, and tied the NBA playoff record set by Mark Eaton and Hakeem Olajuwon. Kobe Bryant scored 31 points and Pau Gasol added 13 points, eight rebounds and eight assists. After the Lakers led the series 3–1, Bynum before Game 5 said, "Close-out games are actually kind of easy." The Lakers won the series 4–3, and avoided becoming the ninth team in NBA history to blow a 3–1 lead in a series. Gasol had 23 points, 17 rebounds and six assists, Bynum had 16 points and a career playoff-high 18 rebounds, and Steve Blake scored a playoff career-high 19 points in a 96–87 win in Game 7. The Lakers blew 16-point lead in the second half before Gasol put the Lakers ahead for good with a tip-in basket with 6:30 to play. Denver had 19 turnovers in the game and shot just 7-of-27 shooting in the fourth quarter. Returning from his seven-game suspension, Metta World Peace scored 15 points, while Bryant had 17 points added eight assists.

=== Oklahoma City Thunder ===
The Lakers were then matched up against the second seeded Oklahoma City Thunder in the second round of the 2012 NBA Playoffs. During this series the Lakers did not have home court advantage as they did against Denver. In the first game of the series the Thunder blew the Lakers out 90–119. In the second game, the Lakers led 75–68 with 2:08 to play but were unable to hold on. Kevin Durant hit the go ahead bucket with 18.6 seconds to go and Steve Blake missed a three-pointer in the corner resulting in a 75-76 Laker loss. The Lakers won game 3 at home 99–96. Kobe Bryant scored 36 points going 18-18 from the free throw line including the last 2 free throws that put the Lakers up by 3. Game 4 ended with a 100-103 Thunder win. The Lakers held a 9-point lead with 6:01 to play in the 4th quarter but were unable to sustain. This time it was Kevin Durant with the go-ahead three-pointer over Metta World Peace. Kobe Bryant had 38 points to lead the Lakers but Russell Westbrook and Kevin Durant were able to both match him combining for 68 points. Ultimately, the eventual Western Conference Champions Thunder proved too much for the Lakers, winning the next game at Chesapeake Energy Arena 90–106, wrapping up the series 1–4. Kobe Bryant averaged 31.2 points per game in the series. Andrew Bynum, the Lakers other All-Star did not perform up to his usual standards and only averaged 16.6 points per game and 9.4 rebounds per game. This was low considering during the regular season he averaged 18.7 points and 11.8 rebounds per game, both career highs. This marked the second year in a row the Lakers were defeated in the second round of the playoffs. The previous year they were swept 4–0 by the Dallas Mavericks.

=== Standings ===
Pacific Division	W	L	PCT	GB	Home	Road	Div	GP
y-Los Angeles Lakers	41	25	.621	–	26‍–‍7	15‍–‍18	9–5	66
x-Los Angeles Clippers	40	26	.606	1.0	24‍–‍9	16‍–‍17	7–7	66
Phoenix Suns	33	33	.500	8.0	19‍–‍14	14‍–‍19	9–5	66
Golden State Warriors	23	43	.348	18.0	12‍–‍21	11‍–‍22	7–8	66
Sacramento Kings	22	44	.333	19.0	16‍–‍17	6‍–‍27	3–10	66

Western Conference
#	Team	W	L	PCT	GB	GP
1	c-San Antonio Spurs *	50	16	.758	–	66
2	y-Oklahoma City Thunder *	47	19	.712	3.0	66
3	y-Los Angeles Lakers *	41	25	.621	9.0	66
4	x-Memphis Grizzlies	41	25	.621	9.0	66
5	x-Los Angeles Clippers	40	26	.606	10.0	66
6	x-Denver Nuggets	38	28	.576	12.0	66
7	x-Dallas Mavericks	36	30	.545	14.0	66
8	x-Utah Jazz	36	30	.545	14.0	66
9	Houston Rockets	34	32	.515	16.0	66
10	Phoenix Suns	33	33	.500	17.0	66
11	Portland Trail Blazers	28	38	.424	22.0	66
12	Minnesota Timberwolves	26	40	.394	24.0	66
13	Golden State Warriors	23	43	.348	27.0	66
14	Sacramento Kings	22	44	.333	28.0	66
15	New Orleans Hornets	21	45	.318	29.0	66

== Game log ==
=== Preseason ===
2011 preseason game log
Total: 0–2 (home: 0–1; road: 0–1)
Preseason: 0–2 (home: 0–1; road: 0–1)

Game	Date	Team	Score	High points	High rebounds	High assists	Location Attendance	Record
1	December 19	L. A. Clippers	L 95-114	Kobe Bryant (22)	Andrew Bynum (12)	Steve Blake (5)	Staples Center; 18,643	0–1
2	December 21	@ L. A. Clippers	L 103-108	Andrew Bynum (26)	Andrew Bynum (11)	Derek Fisher (8)	Staples Center; 19,060	0–2

2011–12 season schedule

=== Regular season ===
2011–12 game log
Total: 41–25 (home: 26–7; road: 15–18)
December: 3–2 (home: 3–1; road: 0–1)

Game	Date	Team	Score	High points	High rebounds	High assists	Location Attendance	Record
1	December 25	Chicago	L 87-88	Kobe Bryant (28)	3 players tied (8)	Kobe Bryant (6)	Staples Center; 18,997	0–1
2	December 26	@ Sacramento	L 91-100	Kobe Bryant (29)	Pau Gasol (9)	Kobe Bryant (6)	Power Balance Pavilion; 17,317	0–2
3	December 27	Utah	W 96-71	Kobe Bryant (26)	Troy Murphy (11)	Kobe Bryant (5)	Staples Center; 18,997	1–2
4	December 29	New York	W 99-82	Kobe Bryant (28)	Pau Gasol (10)	Kobe Bryant (6)	Staples Center; 18,997	2–2
5	December 31	Denver	W 92-89	Andrew Bynum (29)	Andrew Bynum (13)	Kobe Bryant (9)	Staples Center; 18,997	3–2

January: 10–7 (home: 8–1; road: 2–6)

Game	Date	Team	Score	High points	High rebounds	High assists	Location Attendance	Record
6	January 1	@ Denver	L 90-99	Pau Gasol (20)	Andrew Bynum (16)	Bryant & Fisher (4)	Pepsi Center; 19,155	3–3
7	January 3	Houston	W 108-99	Kobe Bryant (37)	Andrew Bynum (22)	Derek Fisher (7)	Staples Center; 18,997	4–3
8	January 5	@ Portland	L 96-107	Kobe Bryant (30)	Andrew Bynum (12)	Derek Fisher (6)	Rose Garden; 20,444	4–4
9	January 6	Golden State	W 97-90	Kobe Bryant (39)	Andrew Bynum (16)	Bryant & Fisher (7)	Staples Center; 18,997	5–4
10	January 8	Memphis	W 90-82	Kobe Bryant (26)	Bynum & Gasol (15)	Kobe Bryant (9)	Staples Center; 18,997	6–4
11	January 10	Phoenix	W 99-83	Kobe Bryant (48)	Pau Gasol (12)	Steve Blake (8)	Staples Center; 18,997	7–4
12	January 11	@ Utah	W 90-87 (OT)	Kobe Bryant (40)	Pau Gasol (11)	Derek Fisher (7)	EnergySolutions Arena; 19,642	8–4
13	January 13	Cleveland	W 97-92	Kobe Bryant (42)	Andrew Bynum (11)	Derek Fisher (10)	Staples Center; 18,997	9–4
14	January 14	@ L.A. Clippers	L 92-102	Kobe Bryant (42)	Andrew Bynum (14)	4 players tied (4)	Staples Center; 19,895	9–5
15	January 16	Dallas	W 73-70	Andrew Bynum (17)	Andrew Bynum (15)	Kobe Bryant (7)	Staples Center; 18,997	10–5
16	January 19	@ Miami	L 87-98	Pau Gasol (26)	Andrew Bynum (12)	Kobe Bryant (7)	American Airlines Arena; 20,004	10–6
17	January 20	@ Orlando	L 80-92	Kobe Bryant (30)	Andrew Bynum (12)	Kobe Bryant (8)	Amway Center; 18,846	10–7
18	January 22	Indiana	L 96-98	Kobe Bryant (33)	3 players tied (8)	Pau Gasol (10)	Staples Center; 18,997	10–8
19	January 25	L.A. Clippers	W 96-91	Kobe Bryant (24)	Pau Gasol (10)	Metta World Peace (7)	Staples Center; 18,997	11–8
20	January 28	@ Milwaukee	L 89-100	Kobe Bryant (27)	Pau Gasol (15)	Kobe Bryant (9)	Bradley Center; 18,027	11–9
21	January 29	@ Minnesota	W 106-101	Kobe Bryant (35)	Kobe Bryant (14)	Derek Fisher (7)	Target Center; 17,551	12–9
22	January 31	Charlotte	W 106-73	Kobe Bryant (24)	Andrew Bynum (11)	Fisher & Murphy (4)	Staples Center; 18,997	13–9

February: 8–5 (home: 4–0; road: 4–5)

Game	Date	Team	Score	High points	High rebounds	High assists	Location Attendance	Record
23	February 3	@ Denver	W 93-89	Andrew Bynum (22)	Pau Gasol (17)	Kobe Bryant (9)	Pepsi Center; 19,155	14–9
24	February 4	@ Utah	L 87-96	Kobe Bryant (26)	Pau Gasol (16)	Pau Gasol (4)	EnergySolutions Arena; 19,642	14–10
25	February 6	@ Philadelphia	L 90-95	Kobe Bryant (28)	Andrew Bynum (20)	Kobe Bryant (6)	Wells Fargo Center; 20,064	14–11
26	February 9	@ Boston	W 88-87 (OT)	Kobe Bryant (27)	Andrew Bynum (17)	Kobe Bryant (4)	TD Garden; 18,624	15–11
27	February 10	@ New York	L 85-92	Kobe Bryant (34)	Andrew Bynum (13)	Steve Blake (3)	Madison Square Garden; 19,763	15–12
28	February 12	@ Toronto	W 94-92	Kobe Bryant (27)	Pau Gasol (17)	Pau Gasol (6)	Air Canada Centre; 19,311	16–12
29	February 14	Atlanta	W 86-78	Pau Gasol (20)	Andrew Bynum (15)	Steve Blake (6)	Staples Center; 18,997	17–12
30	February 17	Phoenix	W 111-99	Kobe Bryant (36)	Andrew Bynum (14)	Blake & Bryant (6)	Staples Center; 18,997	18–12
31	February 19	@ Phoenix	L 90-102	Kobe Bryant (32)	Pau Gasol (12)	Pau Gasol (6)	US Airways Center; 18,023	18–13
32	February 20	Portland	W 103-92	Kobe Bryant (28)	Andrew Bynum (19)	Pau Gasol (4)	Staples Center; 18,997	19–13
33	February 22	@ Dallas	W 96-91	Pau Gasol (24)	Andrew Bynum (14)	Steve Blake (5)	American Airlines Center; 20,577	20–13
34	February 23	@ Oklahoma City	L 85-100	Kobe Bryant (24)	Andrew Bynum (13)	Metta World Peace (5)	Chesapeake Energy Arena; 18,203	20–14
All-Star Break
35	February 29	Minnesota	W 104-85	Kobe Bryant (31)	Andrew Bynum (13)	Kobe Bryant (8)	Staples Center; 18,997	21–14

March: 11–6 (home: 6–3; road: 5–3)

Game	Date	Team	Score	High points	High rebounds	High assists	Location Attendance	Record
36	March 2	Sacramento	W 115-107	Kobe Bryant (38)	Andrew Bynum (15)	Derek Fisher (7)	Staples Center; 18,997	22–14
37	March 4	Miami	W 93-83	Kobe Bryant (33)	Andrew Bynum (13)	Steve Blake (6)	Staples Center; 18,997	23–14
38	March 6	@ Detroit	L 85-88 (OT)	Andrew Bynum (30)	Andrew Bynum (14)	Kobe Bryant (7)	The Palace of Auburn Hills; 22,076	23–15
39	March 7	@ Washington	L 101-106	Kobe Bryant (30)	Pau Gasol (15)	Steve Blake (7)	Verizon Center; 20,282	23–16
40	March 9	@ Minnesota	W 105-102	Kobe Bryant (34)	Pau Gasol (11)	Steve Blake (5)	Target Center; 20,164	24–16
41	March 11	Boston	W 97-94	Kobe Bryant (26)	Andrew Bynum (14)	Kobe Bryant (7)	Staples Center; 18,997	25–16
42	March 13	@ Memphis	W 116-111 (2OT)	Andrew Bynum (37)	Andrew Bynum (16)	Pau Gasol (8)	FedExForum; 18,119	26–16
43	March 14	@ New Orleans	W 107-101 (OT)	Kobe Bryant (33)	Andrew Bynum (18)	Kobe Bryant (5)	New Orleans Arena; 17,272	27–16
44	March 16	Minnesota	W 97-92	Kobe Bryant (28)	Andrew Bynum (14)	Steve Blake (6)	Staples Center; 18,997	28–16
45	March 18	Utah	L 99-103	Andrew Bynum (33)	Andrew Bynum (11)	Barnes & Sessions (6)	Staples Center; 18,997	28–17
46	March 20	@ Houston	L 104-107	Kobe Bryant (29)	Andrew Bynum (7)	3 players tied (4)	Toyota Center; 18,391	28–18
47	March 21	@ Dallas	W 109-93	Kobe Bryant (30)	Barnes & Gasol (9)	Ramon Sessions (9)	American Airlines Center; 20,664	29–18
48	March 23	Portland	W 103-96	Andrew Bynum (28)	Pau Gasol (16)	Ramon Sessions (11)	Staples Center; 18,997	30–18
49	March 25	Memphis	L 96-102	Andrew Bynum (30)	Pau Gasol (14)	Ramon Sessions (5)	Staples Center; 18,997	30–19
50	March 27	@ Golden State	W 104-101	Kobe Bryant (30)	Pau Gasol (17)	Kobe Bryant (5)	Oracle Arena; 19,596	31–19
51	March 29	Oklahoma City	L 93-102	Andrew Bynum (25)	Andrew Bynum (13)	Ramon Sessions (5)	Staples Center; 18,997	31–20
52	March 31	New Orleans	W 88-85	Pau Gasol (21)	Pau Gasol (11)	Ramon Sessions (10)	Staples Center; 18,997	32–20

April: 9–5 (home: 5–2; road: 4–3)

Game	Date	Team	Score	High points	High rebounds	High assists	Location Attendance	Record
53	April 1	Golden State	W 120-112	Kobe Bryant (40)	Gasol & Murphy (11)	Ramon Sessions (9)	Staples Center; 18,897	33–20
54	April 3	New Jersey	W 91-87	Kobe Bryant (24)	Pau Gasol (12)	Ramon Sessions (11)	Staples Center; 18,997	34–20
55	April 4	@ L.A. Clippers	W 113-108	Andrew Bynum (36)	Andrew Bynum (8)	Ramon Sessions (8)	Staples Center; 19,819	35–20
56	April 6	Houston	L 107-112	Kobe Bryant (28)	Matt Barnes (13)	Ramon Sessions (7)	Staples Center; 18,997	35–21
57	April 7	@ Phoenix	L 105-125	Pau Gasol (30)	Andrew Bynum (18)	Ramon Sessions (9)	US Airways Center; 18,237	35–22
58	April 9	@ New Orleans	W 93-91	Pau Gasol (25)	Andrew Bynum (11)	Ramon Sessions (6)	New Orleans Arena; 17,275	36–22
59	April 11	@ San Antonio	W 98-84	Metta World Peace (26)	Andrew Bynum (30)	Ramon Sessions (5)	AT&T Center; 18,581	37–22
60	April 13	Denver	W 103-97	Andrew Bynum (30)	Barnes & Gasol (10)	Ramon Sessions (6)	Staples Center; 18,997	38–22
61	April 15	Dallas	W 112-108 (OT)	Andrew Bynum (23)	Andrew Bynum (16)	Matt Barnes (8)	Staples Center; 18,997	39–22
62	April 17	San Antonio	L 91-112	Andrew Bynum (21)	Bynum & Gasol (7)	Steve Blake (7)	Staples Center; 18,997	39–23
63	April 18	@ Golden State	W 99-87	Andrew Bynum (31)	Pau Gasol (11)	Pau Gasol (11)	Oracle Arena; 18,547	40–23
64	April 20	@ San Antonio	L 97-121	Kobe Bryant (18)	Pau Gasol (8)	Steve Blake (5)	AT&T Center; 18,581	40–24
65	April 22	Oklahoma City	W 114-106 (2OT)	Kobe Bryant (26)	Jordan Hill (15)	Pau Gasol (9)	Staples Center; 18,997	41–24
66	April 26	@ Sacramento	L 96-113	Josh McRoberts (16)	Josh McRoberts (9)	Steve Blake (6)	Power Balance Pavilion; 16,281	41–25

2011–12 season schedule

=== Playoffs ===
2012 playoff game log
Total: 5–7 (home: 4–2; road: 1–5)
First Round: 4–3 (home: 3–1; road: 1–2)

Game	Date	Team	Score	High points	High rebounds	High assists	Location Attendance	Series
1	April 29	Denver	W 103-88	Kobe Bryant (31)	Andrew Bynum (13)	Pau Gasol (8)	Staples Center; 18,997	1–0
2	May 1	Denver	W 104-100	Kobe Bryant (38)	Hill & Gasol (10)	Pau Gasol (5)	Staples Center; 18,997	2–0
3	May 4	@ Denver	L 84-99	Kobe Bryant (22)	Andrew Bynum (12)	Bryant & Sessions (6)	Pepsi Center; 19,155	2–1
4	May 6	@ Denver	W 92-88	Kobe Bryant (22)	Jordan Hill (11)	Bryant & Gasol (6)	Pepsi Center; 19,155	3–1
5	May 8	Denver	L 99-102	Kobe Bryant (43)	Andrew Bynum (11)	Ramon Sessions (4)	Staples Center; 18,997	3–2
6	May 10	@ Denver	L 96-113	Kobe Bryant (31)	Andrew Bynum (16)	Blake & Bryant (4)	Pepsi Center; 19,770	3–3
7	May 12	Denver	W 96-87	Pau Gasol (23)	Andrew Bynum (18)	Kobe Bryant (8)	Staples Center; 18,997	4–3

Conference Semi-finals: 1–4 (home: 1–1; road: 0–3)

Game	Date	Team	Score	High points	High rebounds	High assists	Location Attendance	Series
1	May 14	@ Oklahoma City	L 90-119	Bryant & Bynum (20)	Andrew Bynum (14)	Steve Blake (4)	Chesapeake Energy Arena; 18,203	0–1
2	May 16	@ Oklahoma City	L 75-77	Bryant & Bynum (20)	Pau Gasol (11)	Kobe Bryant (4)	Chesapeake Energy Arena; 18,203	0–2
3	May 18	Oklahoma City	W 99-96	Kobe Bryant (36)	Bynum & Gasol (11)	Bryant & Gasol (6)	Staples Center; 18,997	1–2
4	May 19	Oklahoma City	L 100-103	Kobe Bryant (38)	Andrew Bynum (9)	Bryant & Sessions (5)	Staples Center; 18,997	1–3
5	May 21	@ Oklahoma City	L 90-106	Kobe Bryant (42)	Pau Gasol (16)	Metta World Peace (5)	Chesapeake Energy Arena; 18,203	1–4

2012 playoff schedule

== Player statistics ==
Legend
GP	Games played	GS	Games started	MPG	Minutes per game
FG%	Field-goal percentage	3P%	3-point field-goal percentage	FT%	Free-throw percentage
RPG	Rebounds per game	APG	Assists per game	SPG	Steals per game
BPG	Blocks per game	PPG	Points per game

=== Regular season ===
Player	GP	GS	MPG	FG%	3P%	FT%	RPG	APG	SPG	BPG	PPG
Matt Barnes	63	16	22.9	.452	.333	.742	5.5	2.0	.6	.8	7.8
Steve Blake	53	5	23.3	.377	.335	.778	1.6	3.3	.7	.0	5.2
Kobe Bryant	58	58	38.5	.430	.303	.845	5.4	4.6	1.2	.3	27.9
Andrew Bynum	60	60	35.2	.558	.200	.692	11.8	1.4	.5	1.9	18.7
Devin Ebanks	24	12	16.5	.416	.000	.657	2.3	.5	.5	.3	4.0
Christian Eyenga	1	0	19.0	.500	.000	1.000	2.0	1.0	.0	1.0	8.0
Derek Fisher	43	43	25.6	.383	.324	.830	2.1	3.3	.9	.1	5.9
Pau Gasol	65	65	37.4	.501	.259	.782	10.4	3.6	.6	1.4	17.4
Andrew Goudelock	40	0	10.5	.391	.373	.917	.8	.5	.1	.0	4.4
Jordan Hill	7	1	11.7	.467	.	.625	4.4	.3	.7	.9	4.7
Jason Kapono	27	0	10.0	.382	.296	1.000	.5	.4	.1	.0	2.0
Josh McRoberts	50	6	14.4	.475	.429	.639	3.4	1.0	.3	.4	2.8
Darius Morris	19	0	8.9	.429	.444	.667	.8	1.1	.1	.0	2.4
Troy Murphy	59	0	16.2	.450	.418	.667	3.2	.9	.3	.3	3.2
Ramon Sessions	23	19	30.5	.479	.486	.713	3.8	6.2	.7	.1	12.7
Luke Walton	9	0	7.2	.429	.000	.	1.6	.6	.2	.0	1.3
Metta World Peace	64	45	26.9	.394	.296	.617	3.4	2.2	1.1	.4	7.7

=== Playoffs ===
Player	GP	GS	MPG	FG%	3P%	FT%	RPG	APG	SPG	BPG	PPG
Matt Barnes	11	0	16.8	.271	.161	.500	3.3	1.5	.9	.5	3.5
Steve Blake	12	0	25.5	.419	.419	.714	2.8	2.3	.7	.2	6.3
Kobe Bryant	12	12	39.7	.439	.283	.832	4.8	4.3	1.3	.2	30.0
Andrew Bynum	12	12	37.6	.477	.	.783	11.1	1.5	.4	3.1	16.7
Devin Ebanks	9	6	14.0	.410	.000	.625	2.2	.7	.3	.8	4.1
Christian Eyenga	3	0	3.0	.667	.	.000	.7	.3	.3	.3	1.3
Pau Gasol	12	12	37.0	.434	.400	.828	9.5	3.7	.5	2.1	12.5
Andrew Goudelock	4	0	2.5	.667	1.000	.	.3	.0	.0	.0	1.3
Jordan Hill	12	0	18.1	.434	.	.688	6.3	.1	.3	.7	4.8
Josh McRoberts	6	0	2.7	.250	.000	.	.7	.2	.0	.2	.3
Darius Morris	4	0	2.0	1.000	1.000	.750	.0	.8	.0	.0	2.5
Troy Murphy	4	0	3.8	1.000	1.000	.	.8	.0	.0	.0	.8
Ramon Sessions	12	12	31.7	.377	.160	.743	3.0	3.6	.3	.1	9.7
Metta World Peace	6	6	39.3	.367	.389	.750	3.5	2.3	2.2	.7	11.7

== Awards, records and milestones ==
=== Awards ===
- Pau Gasol won the J. Walter Kennedy Citizenship Award.

=== Week/month ===
The following players were named the Western Conference Players of the Week.

Week	Western Conference	Ref.
Jan. 2 – Jan. 8	Kobe Bryant (Los Angeles Lakers) (1/2)	
Jan. 9 – Jan. 15	Kobe Bryant (Los Angeles Lakers) (2/2)	
Mar. 12 – Mar. 18	Andrew Bynum (Los Angeles Lakers) (1/2)	
Apr. 9 – Apr. 15	Andrew Bynum (Los Angeles Lakers) (2/2)	

The following players were named Western Conference Players of the Month.

Month	Western Conference	Ref.
December – January	Kobe Bryant (Los Angeles Lakers) (1/1)	

=== All-Star ===
- Kobe Bryant was voted as an All-Star starter for the 14th consecutive time.
- Andrew Bynum was voted as an All-Star starter for the 1st time.

=== Records ===
- January 1: Kobe Bryant became the youngest player to score 28,000 career points at 33 years and 131 days old.
- March 27: Kobe Bryant passed Michael Jordan for second most points scored by a player for a single franchise after scoring 30 points against the Golden State Warriors.
- Andrew Bynum recorded 10 blocks against the Denver Nuggets in Game 1 of the NBA Division playoffs tying an NBA playoff record set by Mark Eaton and Hakeem Olajuwon.

=== Team records ===
- January 28: Kobe Bryant made his 7,161st free throw against the Milwaukee Bucks, breaking the Lakers all-time free throw record set by Jerry West.
- January 29: Kobe Bryant made his 9,936th field goal against the Minnesota Timberwolves breaking the Lakers all-time record set by Kareem Abdul-Jabbar.
- February 6: Kobe Bryant passed Shaquille O'Neal into 5th place on the all-time scoring list against the Philadelphia 76ers.
- February 10: Kobe Bryant made his 10,000th career field goal in a game against the New York Knicks.
- March 9: Kobe Bryant, at 33 years and 200 days old, became the youngest player to score 29,000 points in a game against the Minnesota Timberwolves.

=== Milestones ===
- January 20: Los Angeles Lakers power forward Pau Gasol scored his 14,000th career point in a game against the Orlando Magic.

== Transactions ==
=== Additions ===
Power Forwards Troy Murphy, Josh McRoberts, and Guard/Forward Jason Kapono, who was later traded to the Cleveland Cavaliers.

=== Subtractions ===
Derrick Caracter

=== Pre-season trades ===
In December 2011, NBA commissioner David Stern vetoed a proposed three-team trade that would have sent Chris Paul to the Lakers, Lamar Odom to the New Orleans Hornets, and Pau Gasol to the Houston Rockets. Stern said the Hornets were better off keeping Paul than accepting the terms of the deal. The league had acquired the Hornets from former owner George Shinn, and the commissioner's office had final authority over all management decisions. Odom felt "disrespected" after he learned of the Hornets trade publicly, and he requested a trade from the Lakers to another contending team. The Lakers were also concerned that Odom's contract was pricey since he was not needed to initiate the triangle offense with Mike Brown replacing Phil Jackson as Lakers coach. Odom was traded to the Dallas Mavericks for a first-round draft pick and an $8.9 million trade exception on December 11.

=== Mid-season trades ===
On March 15, 2012, the Lakers traded Luke Walton, Jason Kapono, and a 2012 first-round draft pick to the Cleveland Cavaliers for Ramon Sessions, Christian Eyenga, and the right to swap a 2013 first-round pick for Miami's, currently owned by Cleveland. They also traded longtime Laker and co-captain Derrick Fisher and a 2012 first-round draft pick to the Houston Rockets for Jordan Hill. These trades gave them the younger, quicker starting point guard they had been looking for to compete in a league that featured quick, explosive point guards on almost every team. Hill bolstered the Laker frontline which featured oft-injured Andrew Bynum. Both Sessions and Hill added youth to a Laker team filled with old veterans. Although Hill did not play immediately, he later planted himself as a key bench player after his breakout game against the Oklahoma City Thunder. After Metta World Peace was ejected for elbowing James Harden, the shorthanded Lakers called upon Hill. In his first game with significant minutes for the Lakers, he scored 14 points, grabbed 15 rebounds, and blocked 3 shots. Not only did he play an important role in both overtime periods, he was so productive that Coach Mike Brown played Hill instead of Bynum, the Lakers' all star center. Hill helped the Lakers defeat the Thunder, 114–106.

June 23, 2011
To Los Angeles Lakers

- Future second-round picks
To Denver Nuggets

- (Nigeria) Chukwudiebere Maduabum (Draft rights to 56th pick)

December 11, 2011
To Los Angeles Lakers

- First round draft pick
- $8.9 million trade exception
To Dallas Mavericks

- Lamar Odom
- Second-round draft pick

March 15, 2012
To Los Angeles Lakers

- Ramon Sessions
- Christian Eyenga
- Right to swap 2013 first-round pick for Miami's, currently owned by Cleveland
To Cleveland Cavaliers

- Luke Walton
- Jason Kapono
- 2012 first-round pick (lottery-protected)

March 15, 2012
To Los Angeles Lakers

- Jordan Hill
To Houston Rockets

- Derek Fisher
- 2012 first-round pick
