= Devin Ebanks =

American basketball player (born 1989)

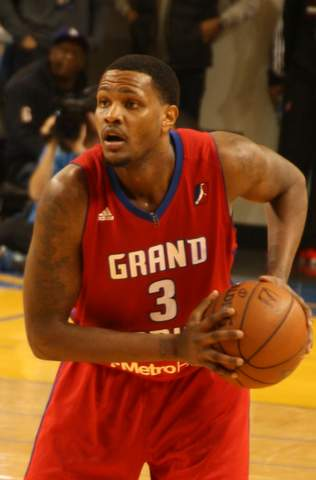
- Ebanks with Grand Rapids Drive in 2016

No. 6 – Manama Club
- Position: Small forward / power forward
- League: Bahraini Premier League

Personal information
- Born: October 28, 1989 (age 36) Queens, New York, U.S.
- Listed height: 6 ft 9 in (2.06 m)
- Listed weight: 215 lb (98 kg)

Career information
- High school: Bishop Loughlin (Brooklyn, New York)
- College: West Virginia (2008–2010)
- NBA draft: 2010: 2nd round, 43rd overall pick
- Drafted by: Los Angeles Lakers
- Playing career: 2010–present

Career history
- 2010–2013: Los Angeles Lakers
- 2010–2011: → Bakersfield Jam
- 2012: → Los Angeles D-Fenders
- 2013–2014: Texas Legends
- 2014: Springfield Armor
- 2014: Bnei Herzliya
- 2014–2015: Halcones Rojos Veracruz
- 2015: Brujos de Guayama
- 2015–2016: Grand Rapids Drive
- 2016: Leones de Ponce
- 2016: Reales de La Vega
- 2017: Atléticos de San Germán
- 2017–2018: Mens Sana 1871 Basket
- 2018–2019: Châlons-Reims
- 2019–2020: San-en NeoPhoenix
- 2020: Indios de Mayagüez
- 2021: Iraklis Thessaloniki
- 2021–2022: Manama Club
- 2022–2024: Al-Ahli
- 2024: Manama Club
- 2024–2026: Al-Ahli
- 2026: Al-Gharafa
- 2026: Beirut Club
- 2026–present: Manama Club

Career highlights
- Bahraini League champion (2022); Bahraini Cup winner (2022); French LNB Pro A Best Scorer (2019); All-NBA D-League Third Team (2016); NBA D-League All-Star (2014)
- Stats at NBA.com
- Stats at Basketball Reference

Devin Maurice Ebanks (born October 28, 1989) is an American professional basketball player for Manama Club of the Bahraini Premier League. He was selected 43rd overall by the Los Angeles Lakers in the 2010 NBA draft, after playing college basketball for two seasons at West Virginia University.

== High school career ==
As a sophomore at Bishop Loughlin Memorial High School in Brooklyn, New York, Ebanks averaged 18 points, six rebounds and 1.3 assists per game. In his junior season, at St. Thomas More School in Connecticut, he averaged 23 points, five rebounds, four assists and three steals. In his senior season, Ebanks recorded an average of 23 points, 10 rebounds and 5 assists per game. He scored over 1,000 points in his two seasons at St. Thomas More.

Ebanks received various honors while a prep player in high school. These honors included the Jordan Brand Classic All-Star Game in New York, playing AAU basketball, and being one of 30 players selected for the 2007 USA Basketball Development Festival at the U.S. Olympic Training Center in Colorado Springs, Colorado. While at the camp, Ebanks averaged 28.2 points and 4.8 rebounds per game.

Ebanks was widely regarded as one of the top high school players in the nation by scouting services, ranking 11th overall and 13th overall in the class by Rivals.com and Scout.com, respectively. He was being pursued by various colleges, such as Indiana, Memphis, Rutgers and Texas. Ebanks originally signed with the Indiana Hoosiers, but was released from his letter of intent after coach Kelvin Sampson was dismissed. Ebanks signed his letter of intent with Bob Huggins' West Virginia University.

== College career ==
At WVU, Ebanks totaled a then season-high 17 rebounds to go along with his 10 points, 3 assists, 3 steals and 2 blocks in a win over Cleveland State. In the following 68–65 loss to #22 Davidson in Madison Square Garden, Ebanks led the team with 17 rebounds and also had 13 points. He then followed up in the Duquesne win with his third double-double: 15 points and 10 rebounds. However, his run was ended as he missed the majority of the Miami University victory with an injury.

Ebanks bounced back with 9 points and 10 rebounds in the win over Radford. In the 76–48 win over Ohio State, Ebanks had 10 points and 5 rebounds. In the following win over Seton Hall, Ebanks had 10 points and 9 rebounds. He played 25 minutes of the loss to #1 UConn, however he only had 4 points and 2 rebounds; in the following loss to Marquette Ebanks had 8 points and 3 rebounds. In the win over Marshall, he totaled 12 points and 4 rebounds, then 5 points and 10 rebounds in the win over USF. In the following win over Georgetown, Ebanks had 9 points and 7 rebounds. In the loss to Pittsburgh in the Backyard Brawl, Ebanks had 9 points and 5 rebounds. In the following win over St. John's, he had 10 points and 8 rebounds.

In the 69–63 loss to Louisville, Ebanks had 14 points and 6 rebounds. As the Mountaineers lost to Syracuse, he recorded 9 points and 9 rebounds. In the 86–59 win over Providence, he had 13 points and 6 rebounds. In the second loss to Pittsburgh, he totaled a season-high 16 points with 7 rebounds. He followed the season-high point-performance with a double-double in the victory over Villanova – 16 points and 10 rebounds. In the 79–68 win over Notre Dame, Ebanks recorded 11 points and 9 rebounds. In the following win over Rutgers, Ebanks had another double-double with 14 points and 11 rebounds. Ebanks had a consecutive double-double in the loss to Cincinnati with 12 points and 14 rebounds. He then had 10 points and 7 rebounds in a victory over South Florida. Ebanks had his 9th double-double of his rookie campaign in the win over DePaul with 14 points and 14 rebounds. Ebanks ended the regular season against #6 Louisville with a season-high 16 points and 10 rebounds for his 10th double-double of the season. Following the 62–59 loss, Ebanks was named to the Big East all-rookie team.

In the second round of the Big East Tournament against Notre Dame, Ebanks scored 7 points and had 5 assists to go with his season-high 18 rebounds. In the following round, defeating the #2 Pittsburgh Panthers 74–60, he had a season-high 20 points with 7 rebounds and 3 assists. In the semifinals, he led the team to overtime against #20 Syracuse, setting a new career-high with 22 points and he also had 6 rebounds, 3 assists and 3 steals in the 74–69 loss. Ebanks was named to the first team All-Big East Tournament squad with his average of 16 points and 10 rebounds during the tenure. However, the Mountaineers lost in the first round of the NCAA Tournament to Dayton, 68–60, with Ebanks scoring 14 points and grabbing 12 rebounds.

For his true freshman season, Ebanks averaged 10.5 points and 7.8 rebounds per game in his starting role. He had season-highs of 22 points against Syracuse and 18 rebounds against Notre Dame. He finished the year with double-point figures in 12 of his last 13 games with six double-doubles in those games. After some speculation, Ebanks announced he would return for his sophomore season.

=== College statistics ===
College	Year	GP	MIN	SPG	BPG	RPG	APG	PPG	FG%	FT%	3P%
West Virginia	2008–09	35	30.2	0.8	0.7	7.8	2.7	10.5	.470	.700	.125
West Virginia	2009–10	34	34.1	1.1	0.7	8.1	2.4	12.0	.457	.770	.100

== Professional career ==
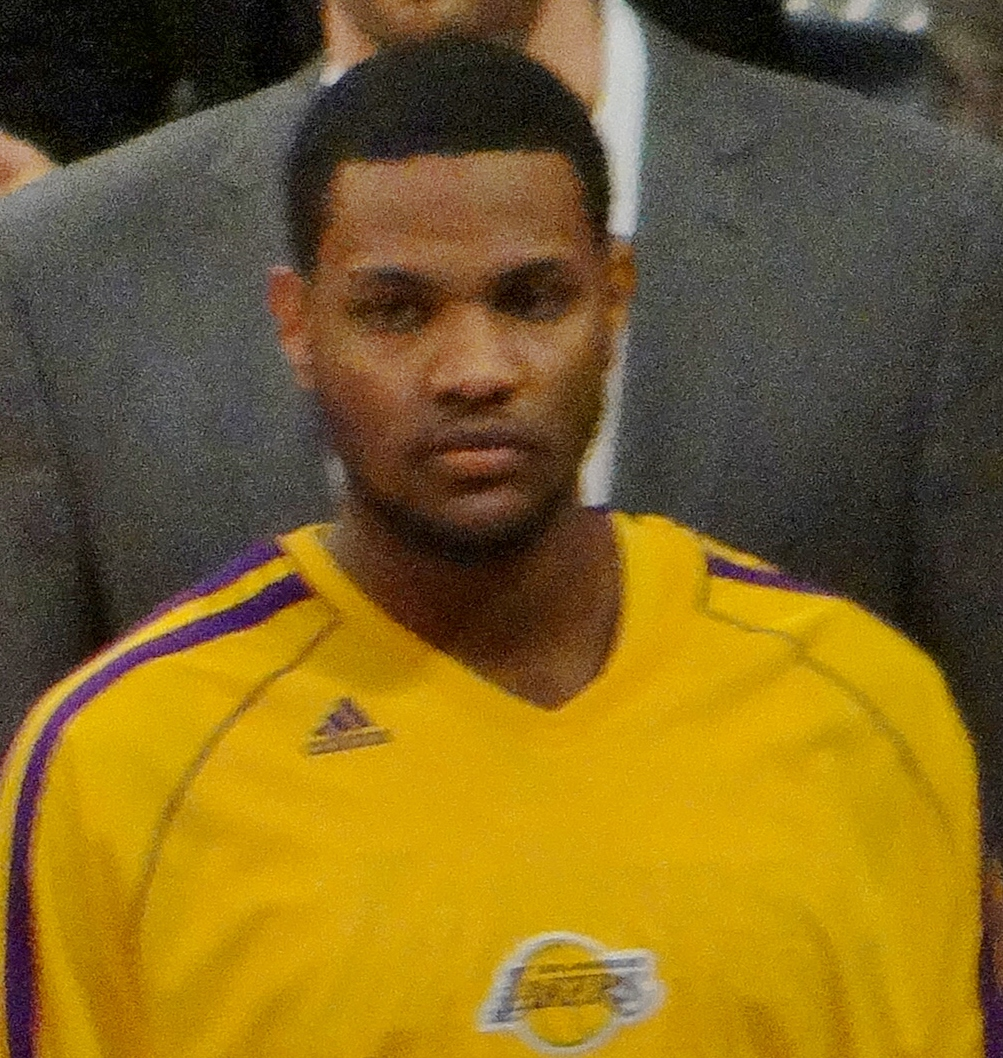
Ebanks with the Los Angeles Lakers in 2013

Ebanks declared for the 2010 NBA draft, and was selected 43rd overall by the Los Angeles Lakers. He was signed on August 12, 2010. On December 27, 2010, the Los Angeles Lakers assigned Ebanks to the Bakersfield Jam of the NBA D-League. On January 8, 2011, the Lakers recalled Ebanks from the Jam as a result of an injury sustained by Matt Barnes. In February 2011, Ebanks fractured his leg while practicing before a game in Memphis.

On December 23, 2011, and in his sophomore season in the NBA, Ebanks was announced the starting small forward, in place of Matt Barnes, by new Laker coach Mike Brown. In his first game as a starter, Ebanks had 8 points, 1 rebound, and 2 assists, against the Chicago Bulls. On February 15, 2012, he was assigned with the Los Angeles D-Fenders. He was later recalled on February 26, 2012. In his sophomore season, he averaged 4 points in 16.5 minutes per game. He also played 12 of 24 games as a starter.

On August 13, 2012, Ebanks re-signed with the Lakers to a one-year deal.

On September 13, 2013, Ebanks signed with the Dallas Mavericks. However, he was waived on October 22. In November 2013, he was acquired by the Texas Legends. On February 3, 2014, Ebanks was named to the Prospects All-Star roster for the 2014 NBA D-League All-Star Game. On February 20, he was traded to the Springfield Armor.

In July 2014, he joined the NBA D-League Select Team for the 2014 NBA Summer League. On August 28, 2014, he signed with Bnei Herzliya of Israel for the 2014–15 season. On October 28, 2014, he parted ways with Herzliya after just three games, with the team citing behavioral issues. On November 29, 2014, he signed with Halcones Rojos Veracruz of Mexico for the rest of the season. In April 2015, he signed with Brujos de Guayama of Puerto Rico for the rest of the 2015 BSN season.

On October 31, 2015, Ebanks was acquired by the Grand Rapids Drive of the NBA Development League. On January 18, 2016, Ebanks scored 43 points in a 128–119 win over the Maine Red Claws, setting a new Drive franchise record. At the season's end, he was named to the All-NBA D-League Third Team.

On April 5, 2016, Ebanks signed with the Leones de Ponce of Puerto Rico for the rest of the 2016 BSN season. Two days later, he made his debut for Leones in a 78–70 loss to the Atenienses de Manatí, recording 18 points, five rebounds and one assist in 34 minutes.

On August 18, 2016, Ebanks signed with Reales de La Vega of Dominican Republic for the rest of the 2016 LNB season.

On August 1, 2017, Ebanks signed with Italian club Mens Sana 1871 Basket of the Serie A2 Basket.

On October 10, 2020, Indios de Mayagüez announced the signing of Ebanks.

On January 22, 2021, Greek club Iraklis Thessaloniki announced the signing of Ebanks. On August 17, 2021, Ebanks signed with Manama of the Bahraini Premier League. He helped Manama win their 21st national championship, as well as their 17th Bahraini Cup after he scored 34 points in the 103–97 finals win over Al Hala.

== NBA career statistics ==
Legend
GP	Games played	GS	Games started	MPG	Minutes per game
FG%	Field goal percentage	3P%	3-point field goal percentage	FT%	Free throw percentage
RPG	Rebounds per game	APG	Assists per game	SPG	Steals per game
BPG	Blocks per game	PPG	Points per game	**Bold**	Career high

=== Regular season ===
Year	Team	GP	GS	MPG	FG%	3P%	FT%	RPG	APG	SPG	BPG	PPG
2010–11	L.A. Lakers	20	0	5.9	.412	**.400**	.783	1.4	.1	.2	**.3**	3.1
2011–12	L.A. Lakers	**24**	**12**	**16.5**	**.416**	.000	.657	**2.3**	**.5**	**.5**	**.3**	**4.0**
2012–13	L.A. Lakers	19	3	10.4	.329	.273	**.786**	2.2	**.5**	.2	.1	3.4
Career		63	15	11.3	.385	.222	.722	1.9	.4	.3	.2	3.6

=== Playoffs ===
Year	Team	GP	GS	MPG	FG%	3P%	FT%	RPG	APG	SPG	BPG	PPG
2012	L.A. Lakers	9	6	14.0	.410	.000	.625	2.2	.7	.3	.8	4.1
Career		9	6	14.0	.410	.000	.625	2.2	.7	.3	.8	4.1
