= 2011–12 Phoenix Suns season =

Professional basketball season

- Head coach: Alvin Gentry
- General manager: Lance Blanks
- Owners: Robert Sarver
- Arena: US Airways Center

Results
- Record: 33–33 (.500)
- Place: Division: 3rd (Pacific); Conference: 10th (Western)
- Playoff finish: Did not qualify
- Stats at Basketball Reference

Local media
- Television: Fox Sports Arizona
- Radio: KTAR

The 2011–12 Phoenix Suns season was the 44th season of the franchise in the National Basketball Association (NBA), as well as the last season the Suns had point guard Steve Nash on the team. The season was shortened to sixty-six games due to the 2011 NBA Lockout. Going into the All-Star break with a 14–20 record, the Suns went 14–6 in their next 20 games to push back into playoffs contention. Towards the end of the season, the eighth-seeded Suns were still in the hunt, but a loss after their second-to-last game on the road against the Utah Jazz eliminated them from playoff contention. They went 8–7 in April, finishing the season with a 33–33 record, 10th-best in the West.

Nash led the team in assists per game (10.7; second-best average in the league, most assists in total), three-point percentage (.390%), and free throw percentage (.894%), while averaging a career-high in field goal percentage (.532%). Center Marcin Gortat led the team in most statistical categories, including games played (66), games started (66), minutes per game (32.0), field goal percentage (.555%), rebounds per game (10.0), blocks per game (1.5), and points per game (15.4). Nash was the lone member of the Suns selected for the 2012 NBA All-Star Game, his eighth appearance. In a game against the Denver Nuggets on April 21, Nash passed Oscar Robertson for fifth all-time in total assists.

== Key dates ==
- June 23, 2011: The 2011 NBA draft took place at the Prudential Center in Newark, New Jersey.
- July 1, 2011: The current NBA collective bargaining agreement expires, leading owners to impose a lockout of its players until a new agreement is reached.
- November 22, 2011: Aaron Brooks signs with the Guangdong Southern Tigers in the CBA. As a result, he can't reunite with the team until the 2011–12 CBA season is officially over.
- December 9, 2011: The new and improved NBA free agency begun; Grant Hill stays with Phoenix; Shannon Brown and Sebastian Telfair join Phoenix; Mickaël Piétrus tried to get traded to the Toronto Raptors; Vince Carter and Gani Lawal are waived.
- December 10, 2011: The Mickaël Piétrus trade is permanently suspended; training camp begins.
- December 13, 2011: Zabian Dowdell is waived and replaced with Ronnie Price.
- December 18, 2011: Training camp ends.
- December 22, 2011: Mickaël Piétrus is waived.
- December 26, 2011: The NBA season begins for Phoenix.
- December 29, 2011: Michael Redd signs with Phoenix.
- January 2, 2012: Garret Siler is waived.
- February 8, 2012: Markieff Morris gets represented as a rookie for the 2012 Rising Stars challenge.
- February 9, 2012: Steve Nash gets his 8th All-Star representation; 6th as a reserve and 6th as a representative of the Phoenix Suns (which ties a record previously set by Walter Davis).
- February 24, 2012: The 2012 NBA All-Star Weekend begins.
- April 18, 2012: The Suns officially induct former head coach John MacLeod in the Phoenix Suns Ring of Honor.

== Offseason ==
=== NBA draft ===
Round	Pick	Player	Position	Nationality	College
1	13	Markieff Morris	Forward	United States	Kansas

The Suns used their only draft pick to select power forward Markieff Morris from Kansas. Morris averaged 13.6 points and 8.3 rebounds per game in his last year with the Jayhawks. The Suns traded their other first-round pick, which they acquired from the Orlando Magic, to the Houston Rockets when they dealt Goran Dragić for Aaron Brooks. Their second-round pick was traded to the Chicago Bulls for Hakim Warrick in a sign and trade. Around a year and a half later, the Suns ended up with the 14th draft pick in Marcus Morris, who would be a part of the team for two or so seasons before being traded himself in 2015.

=== Free agency ===
Veteran forward Grant Hill became an unrestricted free agent at the end of the 2010–11 season. Newly acquired point guard Aaron Brooks became a restricted free agent at the end of the season. On June 23, the Suns extended a $3 million qualifying offer to Brooks. However, due to the lockout, Brooks signed a contract with the Guangdong Southern Tigers of the Chinese Basketball Association on November 22. With no opt-out clause, Brooks had to complete the CBA season before returning to the NBA. On February 6, 2011, reserve point guard Zabian Dowdell was signed for the remainder of the 2010–11 season, with a team option for a second year.

=== Coaching changes ===
On July 14, the Suns signed Elston Turner as an assistant coach. Turner is considered to be a defensive specialist and has been called the Suns' unofficial "defensive coordinator".

== Roster ==
2011–12 Phoenix Suns roster
Players

Pos.	No.	Player	Height	Weight	DOB	From
G	26	Shannon Brown	6 ft 4 in (1.93 m)	210 lb (95 kg)	1985–11–29	Michigan State
G/F	1	Josh Childress	6 ft 8 in (2.03 m)	209 lb (95 kg)	1983–06–20	Stanford
F	3	Jared Dudley	6 ft 7 in (2.01 m)	235 lb (107 kg)	1985–07–10	Boston College
F	8	Channing Frye	7 ft 0 in (2.13 m)	255 lb (116 kg)	1983–05–17	Arizona
C	4	Marcin Gortat	6 ft 11 in (2.11 m)	240 lb (109 kg)	1984–02–17	Poland
F	33	Grant Hill	6 ft 8 in (2.03 m)	225 lb (102 kg)	1972–10–05	Duke
C	15	Robin Lopez	7 ft 0 in (2.13 m)	275 lb (125 kg)	1988–04–01	Stanford
F	11	Markieff Morris	6 ft 10 in (2.08 m)	245 lb (111 kg)	1989–09–02	Kansas
G	13	Steve Nash	6 ft 3 in (1.91 m)	178 lb (81 kg)	1974–02–07	Santa Clara
G	2	Ronnie Price	6 ft 2 in (1.88 m)	190 lb (86 kg)	1984–06–21	Utah Valley
G	22	Michael Redd	6 ft 6 in (1.98 m)	215 lb (98 kg)	1979–08–24	Ohio State
G	31	Sebastian Telfair	6 ft 0 in (1.83 m)	175 lb (79 kg)	1985–06–09	Lincoln HS (NY)
F	21	Hakim Warrick	6 ft 9 in (2.06 m)	219 lb (99 kg)	1982–07–08	Syracuse

Coaches
Head coach
- Alvin Gentry
Assistant(s)
- Bill Cartwright
- Dan Majerle
- Igor Kokoškov
- Elston Turner
- Noel Gillespie

Legend
- (DP) Unsigned draft pick
- (FA) Free agent
- (S) Suspended
- Injured

=== Salaries ===
The final year of Vince Carter's contract was non-guaranteed. Carter's contract stipulated that if he was not waived by the Suns before the start of free agency on July 1, his $18 million would become fully guaranteed. However, with the onset of the lockout, the Suns delayed the deadline until the date on which free agency began at the end of the lockout. Since he was waived by the time the lockout ended and the free agency period officially began that season, he would receive a guaranteed $4 million outside of the team instead. The second-year contracts of Gani Lawal and Garret Siler were non-guaranteed.

== Preseason ==
2011 pre-season game log
Pre-season: 0–2 (home: 0–1; road: 0–1)

Game	Date	Team	Score	High points	High rebounds	High assists	Location Attendance	Record
1	December 20	@ Denver	L 110–127	Marcin Gortat, Hakim Warrick (14)	Marcin Gortat, Markieff Morris (8)	Steve Nash, Sebastian Telfair (5)	Pepsi Center; 11,475	0–1
2	December 22	Denver	L 85–110	Jared Dudley (17)	Markieff Morris (7)	Steve Nash (8)	US Airways Center; 12,613	0–2

2011–12 season schedule

== Regular season ==
=== Standings ===
Pacific Division	W	L	PCT	GB	Home	Road	Div	GP
y-Los Angeles Lakers	41	25	.621	–	26‍–‍7	15‍–‍18	9–5	66
x-Los Angeles Clippers	40	26	.606	1.0	24‍–‍9	16‍–‍17	7–7	66
Phoenix Suns	33	33	.500	8.0	19‍–‍14	14‍–‍19	9–5	66
Golden State Warriors	23	43	.348	18.0	12‍–‍21	11‍–‍22	7–8	66
Sacramento Kings	22	44	.333	19.0	16‍–‍17	6‍–‍27	3–10	66

Western Conference
#	Team	W	L	PCT	GB	GP
1	c-San Antonio Spurs *	50	16	.758	–	66
2	y-Oklahoma City Thunder *	47	19	.712	3.0	66
3	y-Los Angeles Lakers *	41	25	.621	9.0	66
4	x-Memphis Grizzlies	41	25	.621	9.0	66
5	x-Los Angeles Clippers	40	26	.606	10.0	66
6	x-Denver Nuggets	38	28	.576	12.0	66
7	x-Dallas Mavericks	36	30	.545	14.0	66
8	x-Utah Jazz	36	30	.545	14.0	66
9	Houston Rockets	34	32	.515	16.0	66
10	Phoenix Suns	33	33	.500	17.0	66
11	Portland Trail Blazers	28	38	.424	22.0	66
12	Minnesota Timberwolves	26	40	.394	24.0	66
13	Golden State Warriors	23	43	.348	27.0	66
14	Sacramento Kings	22	44	.333	28.0	66
15	New Orleans Hornets	21	45	.318	29.0	66

=== Game log ===
All games from November 1 through December 24 were canceled due to the 2011 NBA Lockout. A new schedule was created with games starting on December 25.

2011–12 game log
Total: 33–33 (Home: 19–14; Road: 14–19)
December: 1–3 (home: 0–2; road: 1–1)

Game	Date	Team	Score	High points	High rebounds	High assists	Location Attendance	Record
1	December 26	New Orleans	L 84–85	Robin Lopez (21)	Markieff Morris (9)	Steve Nash (12)	US Airways Center; 17,776	0–1
2	December 28	Philadelphia	L 83–103	Ronnie Price (16)	Channing Frye, Marcin Gortat (8)	Ronnie Price (4)	US Airways Center; 16,360	0–2
3	December 30	@ New Orleans	W 93–78	Hakim Warrick (18)	Channing Frye (16)	Steve Nash (12)	New Orleans Arena; 15,790	1–2
4	December 31	@ Oklahoma City	L 97–107	Markieff Morris, Hakim Warrick (15)	Marcin Gortat, Markieff Morris (6)	Steve Nash (6)	Chesapeake Energy Arena; 18,203	1–3

January: 6–10 (home: 4–4; road: 2–6)

Game	Date	Team	Score	High points	High rebounds	High assists	Location Attendance	Record
5	January 2	Golden State	W 102–91	Steve Nash (21)	Channing Frye (10)	Steve Nash (9)	US Airways Center; 14,793	2–3
6	January 4	@ Dallas	L 89–98	Marcin Gortat (22)	Channing Frye, Marcin Gortat (10)	Steve Nash (12)	American Airlines Center; 19,885	2–4
7	January 6	Portland	W 102–77	Jared Dudley (18)	Robin Lopez (12)	Steve Nash (9)	US Airways Center; 16,235	3–4
8	January 8	Milwaukee	W 109–93	Marcin Gortat (18)	Markieff Morris (10)	Steve Nash (17)	US Airways Center; 13,420	4–4
9	January 10	@ L. A. Lakers	L 83–99	Channing Frye (17)	Marcin Gortat (12)	Steve Nash (8)	Staples Center; 18,997	4–5
10	January 12	Cleveland	L 90–101	Steve Nash (16)	Marcin Gortat (10)	Steve Nash (15)	US Airways Center; 14,636	4–6
11	January 13	New Jersey	L 103–110	Marcin Gortat (20)	Marcin Gortat (10)	Ronnie Price (8)	US Airways Center; 15,191	4–7
12	January 15	@ San Antonio	L 91–102	Marcin Gortat (24)	Marcin Gortat (15)	Steve Nash (10)	AT&T Center; 18,581	4–8
13	January 17	@ Chicago	L 97–118	Steve Nash (25)	Marcin Gortat (15)	Steve Nash (9)	United Center; 21,347	4–9
14	January 18	@ New York	W 91–88	Steve Nash (26)	Marcin Gortat (12)	Steve Nash (11)	Madison Square Garden; 19,763	5–9
15	January 20	@ Boston	W 79–71	Marcin Gortat (24)	Marcin Gortat (12)	Steve Nash (9)	TD Garden; 18,624	6–9
16	January 23	@ Dallas	L 87–93	Marcin Gortat, Grant Hill (19)	Marcin Gortat (17)	Steve Nash (12)	American Airlines Center; 19,944	6–10
17	January 24	Toronto	L 96–99	Marcin Gortat (21)	Marcin Gortat (12)	Steve Nash (14)	US Airways Center; 15,404	6–11
18	January 27	@ Portland	L 71–109	Grant Hill (12)	Marcin Gortat (10)	Steve Nash (7)	Rose Garden; 20,664	6–12
19	January 28	Memphis	W 86–84	Steve Nash (21)	Marcin Gortat (12)	Steve Nash (6)	US Airways Center; 14,903	7–12
20	January 30	Dallas	L 99–122	Marcin Gortat (17)	Marcin Gortat (10)	Sebastian Telfair (6)	US Airways Center; 13,132	7–13

February: 7–7 (home: 3–3; road: 4–4)

Game	Date	Team	Score	High points	High rebounds	High assists	Location Attendance	Record
21	February 1	@ New Orleans	W 120–103	Steve Nash (30)	Marcin Gortat (11)	Steve Nash (10)	New Orleans Arena; 13,598	8–13
22	February 3	@ Houston	L 81–99	Jared Dudley, Marcin Gortat (15)	Marcin Gortat (12)	Steve Nash (9)	Toyota Center; 15,941	8–14
23	February 4	Charlotte	W 95–89	Michael Redd (17)	Marcin Gortat (12)	Steve Nash (10)	US Airways Center; 14,928	9–14
24	February 6	@ Atlanta	W 99–90	Steve Nash (24)	Channing Frye, Marcin Gortat (9)	Steve Nash (11)	Philips Arena; 11,823	10–14
25	February 7	@ Milwaukee	W 107–105	Marcin Gortat (21)	Josh Childress (12)	Steve Nash (11)	Bradley Center; 13,203	11–14
26	February 9	Houston	L 89–96	Channing Frye (21)	Channing Frye (10)	Steve Nash (13)	US Airways Center; 16,122	11–15
27	February 11	@ Sacramento	W 98–84	Jared Dudley (20)	Jared Dudley (10)	Steve Nash (15)	Power Balance Pavilion; 16,964	12–15
28	February 13	@ Golden State	L 96–102	Marcin Gortat (25)	Marcin Gortat (12)	Steve Nash (14)	Oracle Arena; 19,106	12–16
29	February 14	@ Denver	L 92–109	Markieff Morris (21)	Marcin Gortat (14)	Ronnie Price (6)	Pepsi Center; 17,873	12–17
30	February 15	Atlanta	L 99–101	Steve Nash (22)	Channing Frye (11)	Steve Nash (16)	US Airways Center; 15,392	12–18
31	February 17	@ L. A. Lakers	L 99–111	Marcin Gortat (21)	Marcin Gortat (16)	Steve Nash (17)	Staples Center; 18,997	12–19
32	February 19	L. A. Lakers	W 102–90	Jared Dudley (25)	Marcin Gortat (15)	Steve Nash (14)	US Airways Center; 18,023	13–19
33	February 20	Washington	W 104–88	Marcin Gortat (20)	Channing Frye (11)	Steve Nash (11)	US Airways Center; 13,921	14–19
34	February 22	Golden State	L 104–106	Channing Frye (22)	Marcin Gortat (15)	Steve Nash (9)	US Airways Center; 14,558	14–20
All-Star Break

March: 11–6 (home: 8–2; road: 3–4)

Game	Date	Team	Score	High points	High rebounds	High assists	Location Attendance	Record
35	March 1	Minnesota	W 104–95	Grant Hill (20)	Steve Nash (8)	Steve Nash (17)	US Airways Center; 15,071	15–20
36	March 2	L. A. Clippers	W 81–78	Jared Dudley (22)	Channing Frye, Marcin Gortat (14)	Steve Nash (6)	US Airways Center; 18,091	16–20
37	March 4	Sacramento	W 96–88	Steve Nash (19)	Marcin Gortat (17)	Steve Nash (7)	US Airways Center; 15,026	17–20
38	March 7	@ Oklahoma City	L 104–115	Marcin Gortat (28)	Jared Dudley, Marcin Gortat (11)	Steve Nash (13)	Chesapeake Energy Arena; 18,203	17–21
39	March 8	Dallas	W 96–94	Jared Dudley (18)	Marcin Gortat (12)	Steve Nash (11)	US Airways Center; 15,498	18–21
40	March 10	Memphis	W 98–91	Jared Dudley (19)	Marcin Gortat (9)	Steve Nash (15)	US Airways Center; 16,350	19–21
41	March 12	Minnesota	L 124–127	Jared Dudley (28)	Jared Dudley (9)	Steve Nash (10)	US Airways Center; 14,568	19–22
42	March 14	Utah	W 120–111	Channing Frye (26)	Channing Frye (9)	Steve Nash (16)	US Airways Center; 14,076	20–22
43	March 15	@ L. A. Clippers	W 91–87	Shannon Brown (21)	Jared Dudley, Channing Frye, Marcin Gortat, Markieff Morris (6)	Sebastian Telfair (8)	Staples Center; 19,060	21–22
44	March 16	Detroit	W 109–101	Jared Dudley (23)	Channing Frye (13)	Steve Nash (17)	US Airways Center; 17,148	22–22
45	March 18	Houston	W 99–86	Michael Redd (25)	Marcin Gortat (10)	Steve Nash (11)	US Airways Center; 15,645	23–22
46	March 20	@ Miami	L 95–99	Grant Hill (19)	Marcin Gortat (8)	Steve Nash (10)	American Airlines Arena; 20,212	23–23
47	March 21	@ Orlando	L 93–103	Jared Dudley (17)	Marcin Gortat (9)	Marcin Gortat, Sebastian Telfair (3)	Amway Center; 18,930	23–24
48	March 23	@ Indiana	W 113–111	Marcin Gortat (23)	Marcin Gortat (8)	Steve Nash (17)	Bankers Life Fieldhouse; 14,786	24–24
49	March 25	@ Cleveland	W 108–83	Marcin Gortat, Markieff Morris (22)	Marcin Gortat (8)	Steve Nash (13)	Quicken Loans Arena; 17,307	25–24
50	March 27	San Antonio	L 100–107	Shannon Brown (32)	Marcin Gortat (14)	Steve Nash (8)	US Airways Center; 16,573	25–25
51	March 28	@ L. A. Clippers	L 86–103	Marcin Gortat (23)	Channing Frye, Marcin Gortat (7)	Steve Nash (15)	Staples Center; 19,060	25–26

April: 8–7 (home: 4–3; road: 4–4)

Game	Date	Team	Score	High points	High rebounds	High assists	Location Attendance	Record
52	April 1	New Orleans	W 92–75	Jared Dudley (21)	Channing Frye (11)	Steve Nash (14)	US Airways Center; 15,753	26–26
53	April 3	@ Sacramento	W 109–100	Marcin Gortat (20)	Marcin Gortat (10)	Steve Nash (12)	Power Balance Pavilion; 12,462	27–26
54	April 4	@ Utah	W 107–105	Michael Redd (19)	Marcin Gortat (8)	Steve Nash (9)	EnergySolutions Arena; 19,911	28–26
55	April 6	@ Denver	L 99–105	Shannon Brown (18)	Marcin Gortat (14)	Steve Nash (11)	Pepsi Center; 19,155	28–27
56	April 7	L. A. Lakers	W 125–105	Shannon Brown (24)	Marcin Gortat (9)	Steve Nash (11)	US Airways Center; 18,237	29–27
57	April 9	@ Minnesota	W 114–90	Markieff Morris (21)	Shannon Brown, Marcin Gortat (7)	Sebastian Telfair (7)	Target Center; 17,274	30–27
58	April 11	@ Memphis	L 93–104	Marcin Gortat (19)	Markieff Morris (6)	Steve Nash (10)	FedExForum; 15,239	30–28
59	April 13	@ Houston	W 112–105	Marcin Gortat (20)	Marcin Gortat (15)	Steve Nash (10)	Toyota Center; 18,223	31–28
60	April 14	@ San Antonio	L 91–105	Sebastian Telfair (21)	Robin Lopez, Markieff Morris (9)	Markieff Morris, Sebastian Telfair (4)	AT&T Center; 18,581	31–29
61	April 16	Portland	W 125–107	Marcin Gortat (20)	Marcin Gortat (10)	Steve Nash (13)	US Airways Center; 15,322	32–29
62	April 18	Oklahoma City	L 97–109	Jared Dudley (21)	Marcin Gortat (12)	Steve Nash (5)	US Airways Center; 14,873	32–30
63	April 19	L. A. Clippers	W 93–90	Jared Dudley (18)	Marcin Gortat (14)	Steve Nash (6)	US Airways Center; 14,644	33–30
64	April 21	Denver	L 107–118	Shannon Brown (28)	Marcin Gortat (11)	Steve Nash (13)	US Airways Center; 15,877	33–31
65	April 24	@ Utah	L 88–100	Jared Dudley, Michael Redd (15)	Marcin Gortat (12)	Steve Nash (11)	EnergySolutions Arena; 19,911	33–32
66	April 25	San Antonio	L 106–110	Shannon Brown (21)	Marcin Gortat (10)	Steve Nash (7)	US Airways Center; 17,172	33–33

2011–12 season schedule

== Player statistics ==
Legend
GP	Games played	GS	Games started	MPG	Minutes per game
FG%	Field-goal percentage	3P%	3-point field-goal percentage	FT%	Free-throw percentage
RPG	Rebounds per game	APG	Assists per game	SPG	Steals per game
BPG	Blocks per game	PPG	Points per game

=== Season ===
Player	GP	GS	MPG	FG%	3P%	FT%	RPG	APG	SPG	BPG	PPG
Shannon Brown	59	19	23.7	.420	.362	.808	2.7	1.2	.7	.3	11.0
Josh Childress	34	0	14.4	.485	.167	.000	2.8	1.0	.4	.2	2.9
Jared Dudley	65	60	31.1	.485	.383	.726	4.6	1.7	.8	.3	12.7
Channing Frye	64	59	26.1	.416	.346	.890	5.9	1.4	.7	1.1	10.5
Marcin Gortat	66	66	32.0	.555	.000	.649	10.0	0.9	.7	1.5	15.4
Grant Hill	49	46	28.1	.446	.264	.761	3.5	2.2	.8	.6	10.2
Robin Lopez	64	0	14.0	.461	.000	.714	3.3	0.3	.3	.9	5.4
Markieff Morris	63	7	19.5	.399	.347	.717	4.4	1.0	.7	.7	7.4
Steve Nash	62	62	31.6	.532	.390	.894	3.0	10.7	.6	.1	12.5
Ronnie Price	36	8	14.4	.377	.295	.800	1.6	1.9	.9	.1	3.6
Michael Redd	51	2	15.1	.400	.318	.793	1.5	0.6	.3	.0	8.2
Sebastian Telfair	60	1	14.9	.412	.314	.791	1.5	2.3	.7	.2	6.1
Hakim Warrick	35	0	14.4	.411	.100	.768	2.6	0.9	.2	.1	6.4

== Awards, records and milestones ==
=== Awards ===
- Former head coach John MacLeod gets put into the Phoenix Suns Ring of Honor on April 18, 2012, against the Oklahoma City Thunder.
- Steve Nash was named the winner of the PBWA's Magic Johnson Award, which is an award given to the player that best combines excellence on the court with cooperation and dignity in dealing with the media and the public alike.

==== All-Star ====
- Markieff Morris is represented in the 2012 Rising Stars Challenge.
- Steve Nash gets his 8th representation as an All-Star player, with this being his 6th and final representation coming from the Phoenix Suns.

=== Records ===
- Josh Childress broke the record for the most number of minutes played in one season without making a free throw with 491 minutes played this season.

=== Team Records ===
- Steve Nash surpassed Dick Van Arsdale as the third-most played Suns player ever.
- Steve Nash made his 1,000th 3 pointer with the Phoenix Suns on December 31, 2011.
- Steve Nash becomes the #1 assist leader of all Phoenix Suns players on February 1, 2012, surpassing the mark previously set by Kevin Johnson.

=== Milestones ===
- Steve Nash gets his 16,000th career point on January 12, 2012.
- Steve Nash passes Oscar Robertson as the third-most player with 15+ assist games on March 10, 2012. He's currently behind John Stockton and Magic Johnson.
- Grant Hill gets his 17,000th career point on March 20, 2012.
- Steve Nash passes Oscar Robertson as the fifth-most NBA assists leader of all time on April 21, 2012.
- Marcin Gortat averages his first ever double-double throughout an entire season.

=== Team Milestones ===
- The Suns committed the franchise's lowest turnover count in a game with 3 turnovers against the Los Angeles Lakers on April 7, 2012.

== Injuries/Missed games ==
- 12/20/11: Marcin Gortat: Non-displaced right thumb fracture; out until December 25
- 12/30/11: Michael Redd: Left knee; placed on injured list until January 12
- 01/13/12: Grant Hill: Strained right quadriceps; did not play
- 01/13/12: Steve Nash: Bruised right quadriceps; did not play
- 01/25/12: Robin Lopez: League suspension (making contact with a referee): did not play
- 01/30/12: Steve Nash: Bruised left thigh; did not play
- 02/04/12: Jared Dudley: Bruised thigh; did not play
- 02/14/12: Grant Hill: Rest; did not play
- 02/14/12: Steve Nash: Rest; did not play
- 03/15/12: Grant Hill: Rest; did not play
- 03/15/12: Steve Nash: Rest; did not play
- 03/27/12: Grant Hill: Right knee inflammation; did not play
- 03/28/12: Grant Hill: Right knee inflammation; did not play
- 03/28/12: Markieff Morris: Flu; did not play
- 03/30/12: Grant Hill: Surgery to repair torn meniscus in right knee; out until April 13
- 04/16/12: Grant Hill: Right knee; did not play
- 04/18/12: Grant Hill: Right knee; did not play
- 04/19/12: Grant Hill: Right knee, did not play
- 04/21/12: Grant Hill: Right knee, did not play
- 04/24/12: Channing Frye: Subluxed right shoulder; did not play
- 04/25/12: Channing Frye: Subluxed right shoulder; did not play
- 04/25/12: Grant Hill: Right knee; did not play

== Transactions ==
=== Free agents ===
==== Additions ====
Player	Signed	Former Team
Sebastian Telfair	Signed a 1-year deal that was worth $1.5 Million.	Minnesota Timberwolves
Shannon Brown	Signed a 1-year deal that was worth $3.5 Million.	Los Angeles Lakers
Grant Hill	Signed a 1-year deal that was worth $6.5 Million.	Phoenix Suns
Ronnie Price	Signed a 1-year deal that was worth $854,389.	Utah Jazz
Michael Redd	Signed a 1-year deal that was worth $1.3 Million.	Milwaukee Bucks

a: Michael Redd signed onto the team two games after the beginning of the 2011–12 season. However, he didn't start playing until January 12, 2012 due to Redd fully recovering from some knee injuries during his last two seasons in Milwaukee.

==== Subtractions ====
Player	Reason left	New team
Aaron Brooks	Lockout Concerns	(China) Guangdong Winnerway (Hongyuan) Southern Tigers
Gani Lawal	Lockout Concerns / Waived	(Poland) Zastal Zielona Góra / San Antonio Spurs / (China) Xinjiang Guanghui Flying Tigers / (France) Chorale Roanne Basket
Vince Carter	Waived	Dallas Mavericks
Zabian Dowdell	Waived	(Turkey) Anadolu Efes Pilsen Spor Kulübü / (Spain) Club Baloncesto Gran Canaria – Claret, S.A.D.
Mickaël Piétrus	Waived	Boston Celtics
Garret Siler	Waived	(China) Jiangsu Nangang Dragons

b: Gani Lawal originally left due to the 2011 NBA lockout in concerns of playing the season. He signed with Zastal Zielona Góra in Poland before returning to Phoenix once the lockout ended. However, Gani was waived by the team alongside Vince Carter once the season began, and he tried a stint with the San Antonio Spurs for their training camp before being waived again. He later found a new team in the Xinjiang Guanghui Flying Tigers, but due to personal problems, he returned to playing with Zastal once more before finishing his season with Chorale Roanne Basket in France.
c: Vince Carter was paid $4 million in order to get out of his contract with the Suns.
d: Zabian Dowdell originally signed a deal to play with Anadolu Efes Pilsen Spor Kulübü in Turkey on January 18, 2012. However, due to a failed physical, he would be waived from the team before even having a change to play for them. He would then play with Club Baloncesto Gran Canaria – Claret, S.A.D. on March 17, 2016 after passing their own physical exam.
e: Mickaël Piétrus was paid $1.2 million in order to get out of his contract with the Suns.
f: Garret Siler was waived after the January 2 game against the Golden State Warriors. He didn't play a single game with the Phoenix Suns in the regular season.
g: Garret Siler signed with the Jiangsu Nangang Dragons of the Chinese Basketball Association quite some time after this season ended.

== See also ==
- 2011–12 NBA season
