= 2011–12 Denver Nuggets season =

NBA professional basketball team season

- Head coach: George Karl
- General manager: Masai Ujiri
- Owner: Stan Kroenke
- Arena: Pepsi Center

Results
- Record: 38–28 (.576)
- Place: Division: 2nd (Northwest); Conference: 6th (Western)
- Playoff finish: First round (lost to Lakers 3–4)
- Stats at Basketball Reference

Local media
- Television: Altitude Sports and Entertainment
- Radio: KCKK

The 2011–12 Denver Nuggets season was the 45th season of the franchise, and its 36th season in the National Basketball Association (NBA). This is the first full season since 2002-03 season that Carmelo Anthony was not on the opening day roster. Denver finished the lockout-shortened season in sixth place in the Western Conference with a 38–28 record and were eliminated in the first round of the 2012 NBA Playoffs by the Los Angeles Lakers in seven games. The Nuggets finished the regular season leading the league in points per game (104.12) and assists per game (23.96).

== Key dates ==
- June 23: The 2011 NBA draft took place at Prudential Center in Newark, New Jersey. With the 22nd overall pick in the draft, the Nuggets selected Kenneth Faried from Morhead State.

== Draft ==
Round	Pick	Player	Position	Nationality	School/Club team
1	22	Kenneth Faried	PF	United States	Morehead State University

== Roster ==
2011–12 Denver Nuggets roster
Players

Pos.	No.	Player	Height	Weight	DOB	From
SG	6	Arron Afflalo	6 ft 5 in (1.96 m)	215 lb (98 kg)	1985-10-15	UCLA
C	11	Chris Andersen	6 ft 10 in (2.08 m)	245 lb (111 kg)	1978-07-07	Blinn
SF	13	Corey Brewer	6 ft 9 in (2.06 m)	188 lb (85 kg)	1986-03-05	Florida
SF	21	Wilson Chandler	6 ft 8 in (2.03 m)	225 lb (102 kg)	1987-05-10	DePaul
PF	35	Kenneth Faried	6 ft 8 in (2.03 m)	228 lb (103 kg)	1989-11-19	Morehead State
SG	5	Rudy Fernández	6 ft 6 in (1.98 m)	185 lb (84 kg)	1985-04-04	Spain
SF	8	Danilo Gallinari	6 ft 10 in (2.08 m)	233 lb (106 kg)	1988-08-08	Italy
SF	1	Jordan Hamilton	6 ft 7 in (2.01 m)	220 lb (100 kg)	1990-10-06	Texas
PF	7	Al Harrington	6 ft 9 in (2.06 m)	250 lb (113 kg)	1980-02-17	St. Patrick HS (NJ)
C	41	Kosta Koufos	7 ft 0 in (2.13 m)	265 lb (120 kg)	1989-02-24	Ohio State
PG	3	Ty Lawson	5 ft 11 in (1.80 m)	195 lb (88 kg)	1987-11-03	North Carolina
C	34	JaVale McGee	7 ft 0 in (2.13 m)	252 lb (114 kg)	1988-01-19	Nevada
SG	24	Andre Miller	6 ft 3 in (1.91 m)	200 lb (91 kg)	1976-03-19	Utah
C	25	Timofey Mozgov	7 ft 1 in (2.16 m)	250 lb (113 kg)	1986-07-16	Russia
SG	10	Julyan Stone	6 ft 6 in (1.98 m)	200 lb (91 kg)	1988-12-07	UTEP

Coaches
Head coach
- George Karl
Assistant(s)
- Ryan Bowen
- Melvin Hunt
- Chad Iske
- Jesse Mermuys
- Patrick Mutombo (player development)
- John Welch

Legend
- (DP) Unsigned draft pick
- (FA) Free agent
- (S) Suspended
- Injured

Roster
Updated: March 18, 2012

== Regular season ==
=== Standings ===
Northwest Division	W	L	PCT	GB	Home	Road	Div	GP
y-Oklahoma City Thunder	47	19	.712	–	26‍–‍7	21‍–‍12	10–3	66
x-Denver Nuggets	38	28	.576	9.0	20‍–‍13	18‍–‍15	6–7	66
x-Utah Jazz	36	30	.545	11.0	25‍–‍8	11‍–‍22	9–4	66
Portland Trail Blazers	28	38	.424	19.0	20‍–‍13	8‍–‍25	4–10	66
Minnesota Timberwolves	26	40	.394	21.0	13‍–‍20	13‍–‍20	4–9	66

Western Conference
#	Team	W	L	PCT	GB	GP
1	c-San Antonio Spurs *	50	16	.758	–	66
2	y-Oklahoma City Thunder *	47	19	.712	3.0	66
3	y-Los Angeles Lakers *	41	25	.621	9.0	66
4	x-Memphis Grizzlies	41	25	.621	9.0	66
5	x-Los Angeles Clippers	40	26	.606	10.0	66
6	x-Denver Nuggets	38	28	.576	12.0	66
7	x-Dallas Mavericks	36	30	.545	14.0	66
8	x-Utah Jazz	36	30	.545	14.0	66
9	Houston Rockets	34	32	.515	16.0	66
10	Phoenix Suns	33	33	.500	17.0	66
11	Portland Trail Blazers	28	38	.424	22.0	66
12	Minnesota Timberwolves	26	40	.394	24.0	66
13	Golden State Warriors	23	43	.348	27.0	66
14	Sacramento Kings	22	44	.333	28.0	66
15	New Orleans Hornets	21	45	.318	29.0	66

=== Game log ===
2011–12 game log
Total: 38–28 (home: 20–13; road: 18–15)
December: 2–2 (home: 1–0; road: 1–2)

Game	Date	Team	Score	High points	High rebounds	High assists	Location Attendance	Record
1	December 26	@ Dallas	W 115–93	Ty Lawson (27)	Danilo Gallinari; Nenê (7)	Andre Miller (5)	American Airlines Center; 20,408	1–0
2	December 28	Utah	W 117–100	Nenê (25)	Al Harrington; Nenê (7)	Andre Miller (12)	Pepsi Center; 19,155	2–0
3	December 29	@ Portland	L 102–111	Ty Lawson (25)	Nenê (9)	Andre Miller (8)	Rose Garden; 20,531	2–1
4	December 31	@ L. A. Lakers	L 89–92	Al Harrington (21)	Timofey Mozgov (10)	Ty Lawson (8)	Staples Center; 18,997	2–2

January: 12–5 (home: 6–3; road: 6–2)

Game	Date	Team	Score	High points	High rebounds	High assists	Location Attendance	Record
5	January 1	L. A. Lakers	W 99–90	Danilo Gallinari (20)	Al Harrington (11)	Ty Lawson (10)	Pepsi Center; 19,155	3–2
6	January 2	Milwaukee	W 91–86	Danilo Gallinari (21)	Danilo Gallinari (10)	Ty Lawson (6)	Pepsi Center; 14,142	4–2
7	January 4	Sacramento	W 110–83	Al Harrington (15)	Kosta Koufos (10)	Rudy Fernández (8)	Pepsi Center; 14,562	5–2
8	January 6	@ New Orleans	W 96–88	Danilo Gallinari (23)	Nenê (8)	Ty Lawson (8)	New Orleans Arena; 13,035	6–2
9	January 7	@ San Antonio	L 117–121	Danilo Gallinari (31)	Andre Miller (6)	Ty Lawson (10)	AT&T Center; 17,537	6–3
10	January 9	New Orleans	L 81–94	Danilo Gallinari; Ty Lawson (15)	Nenê (11)	Nenê (4)	Pepsi Center; 14,002	6–4
11	January 11	New Jersey	W 123–115	Danilo Gallinari (22)	Nenê (9)	Andre Miller (12)	Pepsi Center; 14,139	7–4
12	January 13	Miami	W 117–104	Ty Lawson (24)	Nenê (12)	Ty Lawson (9)	Pepsi Center; 19,155	8–4
13	January 15	Utah	L 96–106	Nenê; Danilo Gallinari (18)	Al Harrington (7)	Ty Lawson (8)	Pepsi Center; 16,208	8–5
14	January 17	@ Milwaukee	W 105–95	Corey Brewer (22)	Nenê (9)	Andre Miller (11)	Bradley Center; 11,322	9–5
15	January 18	@ Philadelphia	W 108–104 (OT)	Andre Miller (28)	Nenê (14)	Andre Miller (10)	Wells Fargo Center; 15,201	10–5
16	January 20	@ Washington	W 108–104	Al Harrington (29)	Ty Lawson (9)	Ty Lawson (7)	Verizon Center; 14,866	11–5
17	January 21	@ New York	W 119–114 (2OT)	Danilo Gallinari (37)	Nenê (13)	Andre Miller (12)	Madison Square Garden; 19,763	12–5
18	January 25	@ Sacramento	W 122–93	Danilo Gallinari (23)	Kosta Koufos (7)	Andre Miller (10)	Power Balance Pavilion; 12,097	13–5
19	January 27	Toronto	W 96–81	Rudy Fernández (23)	Nenê (10)	Andre Miller (12)	Pepsi Center; 18,855	14–5
20	January 29	L. A. Clippers	L 105–109	Nenê (18)	Nenê (9)	Andre Miller (10)	Pepsi Center; 19,495	14–6
21	January 31	@ Memphis	L 97–100 (OT)	Al Harrington (23)	Al Harrington (10)	Andre Miller (6)	FedEx Forum; 13,651	14–7

February: 5–10 (home: 3–5; road: 2–5)

Game	Date	Team	Score	High points	High rebounds	High assists	Location Attendance	Record
22	February 2	@ L. A. Clippers	W 112–91	Danilo Gallinari (21)	Timofey Mozgov (7)	Andre Miller (8)	Staples Center; 19,223	15–7
23	February 3	L. A. Lakers	L 89–93	Al Harrington (24)	Al Harrington (8)	Ty Lawson; Andre Miller (7)	Pepsi Center; 19,155	15–8
24	February 4	@ Portland	L 97–117	Danilo Gallinari (20)	Kosta Koufos (12)	Ty Lawson (5)	Rose Garden; 20,583	15–9
25	February 6	Houston	L 90–99	Rudy Fernández; Danilo Gallinari (14)	Al Harrington (15)	Ty Lawson (7)	Pepsi Center; 14,501	15–10
26	February 8	Dallas	L 95–105	Rudy Fernández; Al Harrington (17)	Nenê (10)	Ty Lawson (10)	Pepsi Center; 15,970	15–11
27	February 9	Golden State	L 101–109	Arron Afflalo (26)	Kenneth Faried (10)	Ty Lawson (10)	Pepsi Center; 14,960	15–12
28	February 11	@ Indiana	W 113–109	Ty Lawson (27)	Kosta Koufos (7)	Andre Miller (4)	Bankers Life Fieldhouse; 15,313	16–12
29	February 14	Phoenix	W 109–92	Arron Afflalo (20)	Kenneth Faried; Kosta Koufos (9)	Andre Miller (7)	Pepsi Center; 17,873	17–12
30	February 15	@ Dallas	L 84–102	Rudy Fernández (14)	Kosta Koufos (14)	Corey Brewer; Julyan Stone (4)	American Airlines Center; 20,075	17–13
31	February 17	@ Memphis	L 102–103	Corey Brewer (26)	Kenneth Faried (10)	Andre Miller (9)	Pepsi Center; 15,201	17–14
32	February 19	@ Oklahoma City	L 118–124 (OT)	Arron Afflalo (27)	Al Harrington (11)	Andre Miller (10)	Chesapeake Energy Arena; 18,203	17–15
33	February 20	Minnesota	W 103–101 (OT)	Al Harrington (31)	Kenneth Faried (14)	Andre Miller (12)	Pepsi Center; 17,263	18–15
34	February 22	@ L. A. Clippers	L 95–103	Arron Afflalo (20)	Kenneth Faried (9)	Andre Miller (8)	Staples Center; 19,163	18–16
35	February 23	San Antonio	L 99–114	Corey Brewer (23)	Jordan Hamilton; Al Harrington (9)	Andre Miller; Julyan Stone (12)	Pepsi Center; 18,875	18–17
36	February 29	Portland	W 104–95	Ty Lawson (18)	Kosta Koufos (11)	Ty Lawson (9)	Pepsi Center; 15,715	19–17

March: 9–7 (home: 5–4; road: 4–3)

Game	Date	Team	Score	High points	High rebounds	High assists	Location Attendance	Record
37	March 2	@ Houston	W 117–105	Ty Lawson (22)	Kenneth Faried (11)	Ty Lawson (15)	Toyota Center; 16,879	20–17
38	March 4	@ San Antonio	W 99–94	Ty Lawson (22)	Ty Lawson (9)	Ty Lawson (11)	AT&T Center; 18,581	21–17
39	March 5	Sacramento	W 119–116 (OT)	Arron Afflalo (32)	Kenneth Faried (12)	Ty Lawson (13)	Pepsi Center; 14,823	22–17
40	March 7	Cleveland	L 99–100	Al Harrington (22)	Kenneth Faried (9)	Ty Lawson (6)	Pepsi Center; 15,816	22–18
41	March 9	New Orleans	W 110–97	Arron Afflalo (28)	Al Harrington (10)	Ty Lawson (10)	Pepsi Center; 19,155	23–18
42	March 11	Memphis	L 91–94	Three players (15)	Chris Andersen; Nenê (9)	Andre Miller (7)	Pepsi Center; 17,737	23–19
43	March 13	Atlanta	W 118–117 (OT)	Nenê (22)	Kenneth Faried (9)	Andre Miller (8)	Pepsi Center; 15,594	24–19
44	March 15	Oklahoma City	L 90–103	Andre Miller (17)	Kenneth Faried (9)	Ty Lawson (5)	Pepsi Center; 18,458	24–20
45	March 17	Boston	W 98–91	Danilo Gallinari (20)	Kenneth Faried (16)	Ty Lawson (10)	Pepsi Center; 19,003	25–20
46	March 19	Dallas	L 95–112	Arron Afflalo (24)	Al Harrington (9)	Danilo Gallinari (7)	Pepsi Center; 16,683	25–21
47	March 21	Detroit	W 116–115	Ty Lawson (25)	Wilson Chandler (10	Andre Miller (7)	Pepsi Center; 16,681	26–21
48	March 23	@ Utah	L 102–121	Al Harrington (20)	Al Harrington (10)	Ty Lawson; Andre Miller (6)	EnergySolutions Arena; 19,250	26–22
49	March 25	@ Minnesota	L 100–117	Kenneth Faried (17)	JaVale McGee (11)	Wilson Chandler; Ty Lawson (5)	Target Center; 20,023	26–23
50	March 26	@ Chicago	W 108–91	Ty Lawson (27)	Ty Lawson (9)	Andre Miller (10)	United Center; 22,274	27–23
51	March 28	@ Toronto	L 96–105	Ty Lawson (26)	Wilson Chandler (8)	Ty Lawson (9)	Air Canada Centre; 15,867	27–24
52	March 30	@ Charlotte	W 99–88	Arron Afflalo (19)	Arron Afflalo; Al Harrington (11)	Ty Lawson (10)	Time Warner Cable Arena; 13,806	28–24

April: 10–4 (home: 5–1; road: 5–3)

Game	Date	Team	Score	High points	High rebounds	High assists	Location Attendance	Record
53	April 1	@ Orlando	W 104–101	Ty Lawson (25)	Kenneth Faried (9)	Ty Lawson (9)	Amway Center; 18,846	29–24
54	April 4	@ New Orleans	L 92–94	Ty Lawson (22)	Kenneth Faried (8)	Arron Afflalo (7)	New Orleans Arena; 15,020	29–25
55	April 6	Phoenix	W 105–99	Arron Afflalo (30)	Kenneth Faried; Kosta Koufos (8)	Ty Lawson (8)	Pepsi Center; 19,155	30–25
56	April 7	@ Golden State	L 97–112	Ty Lawson (21)	JaVale McGee; Andre Miller (6)	Ty Lawson (6)	Oracle Arena; 18,942	30–26
57	April 9	Golden State	W 123–84	Kenneth Faried (27)	Kenneth Faried (17)	Andre Miller (12)	Pepsi Center; 15,530	31–26
58	April 11	Minnesota	W 113–107	Ty Lawson (24)	Kenneth Faried (12)	Ty Lawson (8)	Pepsi Center; 15,823	32–26
59	April 13	@ L. A. Lakers	L 97–103	Andre Miller (20)	JaVale McGee (10)	Andre Miller (6)	Staples Center; 18,997	32–27
60	April 15	Houston	W 101–86	Arron Afflalo; Ty Lawson (20)	Kenneth Faried (11)	Andre Miller (11)	Pepsi Center; 17,954	33–27
61	April 16	@ Houston	W 105–102	Arron Afflalo (26)	Al Harrington (9)	Andre Miller (13)	Toyota Center; 15,988	34–27
62	April 18	L. A. Clippers	L 98–104	Ty Lawson (24)	Kosta Koufos (9)	Andre Miller (8)	Pepsi Center; 17,219	34–28
63	April 21	@ Phoenix	W 118–107	Ty Lawson (29)	Kenneth Faried (14)	Ty Lawson (10)	US Airways Center; 15,877	35–28
64	April 22	Orlando	W 101–74	Danilo Gallinari; JaVale McGee (17)	Kenneth Faried (10)	Andre Miller (11)	Pepsi Center; 19,155	36–28
65	April 25	@ Oklahoma City	W 106–101	Ty Lawson (25)	Kenneth Faried (10)	Andre Miller (6)	Chesapeake Energy Arena; 18,203	37–28
66	April 26	@ Minnesota	W 131–102	JaVale McGee (19)	Kosta Koufos (11)	Andre Miller (10)	Target Center; 14,824	38–28

2011–12 season schedule

== Playoffs ==
2012 playoff game log
First round: 3–4 (home: 2–1; road: 1–3)

Game	Date	Team	Score	High points	High rebounds	High assists	Location Attendance	Series
1	April 29	@ L. A. Lakers	L 88–103	Danilo Gallinari (19)	Andre Miller, Kenneth Faried (8)	Andre Miller (7)	Staples Center; 18,997	0–1
2	May 1	@ L. A. Lakers	L 100–104	Ty Lawson (25)	Kenneth Faried (10)	Andre Miller (8)	Staples Center; 18,997	0–2
3	May 4	L. A. Lakers	W 99–84	Ty Lawson (25)	JaVale McGee (15)	Ty Lawson (7)	Pepsi Center; 19,155	1–2
4	May 6	L. A. Lakers	L 88–92	Danilo Gallinari (20)	Andre Miller, Kenneth Faried (7)	Ty Lawson (6)	Pepsi Center; 19,155	1–3
5	May 8	@ L. A. Lakers	W 102–99	Andre Miller (24)	JaVale McGee (14)	Ty Lawson, Andre Miller (8)	Staples Center; 18,997	2–3
6	May 10	L. A. Lakers	W 113–96	Ty Lawson (32)	Kenneth Faried (11)	Arron Afflalo, Danilo Gallinari (7)	Pepsi Center; 19,770	3–3
7	May 12	@ L. A. Lakers	L 87–96	Al Harrington, Ty Lawson (24)	JaVale McGee (14)	Andre Miller (8)	Staples Center; 18,997	3–4

2012 playoff schedule

== Player statistics ==
Legend
GP	Games played	GS	Games started	MPG	Minutes per game
FG%	Field-goal percentage	3P%	3-point field-goal percentage	FT%	Free-throw percentage
RPG	Rebounds per game	APG	Assists per game	SPG	Steals per game
BPG	Blocks per game	PPG	Points per game

=== Regular season ===
Player	GP	GS	MPG	FG%	3P%	FT%	RPG	APG	SPG	BPG	PPG
Arron Afflalo	62	62	33.6	.471	.398	.798	3.2	2.4	.6	.2	15.2
Chris Andersen	32	1	15.2	.546		.610	4.6	.2	.6	1.4	5.3
Corey Brewer	59	17	21.8	.434	.260	.692	2.5	1.5	1.2	.3	8.9
DeMarre Carroll ^{[a]}	4	0	5.3	1.000			.8	.8	.0	.0	3.0
Wilson Chandler	8	6	26.9	.392	.250	.833	5.1	2.1	.8	.8	9.4
Kenneth Faried	46	39	22.5	.586		.665	7.7	.8	.7	1.0	10.2
Rudy Fernandez	31	1	22.9	.440	.328	.698	2.1	2.4	1.0	.1	8.6
Danilo Gallinari	43	40	31.4	.414	.328	.871	4.7	2.7	1.0	.5	14.6
Jordan Hamilton	26	2	9.9	.432	.362	.400	2.4	.8	.2	.1	4.4
Al Harrington	64	1	27.5	.446	.333	.676	6.1	1.4	.9	.2	14.2
Nene Hilario ^{[a]}	28	27	29.5	.509	.000	.677	7.4	2.2	1.3	.9	13.4
Kosta Koufos	48	24	16.5	.599		.600	5.4	.3	.5	.9	5.5
Ty Lawson	61	61	34.8	.488	.365	.824	3.7	6.6	1.3	.1	16.4
JaVale McGee ^{[a]}	20	5	20.6	.612		.373	5.8	.3	.5	1.6	10.3
Andre Miller	66	7	27.4	.438	.217	.811	3.3	6.7	1.0	.1	9.7
Timofey Mozgov	44	35	15.6	.526		.684	4.1	.5	.3	1.0	5.4
Julyan Stone	22	2	8.1	.419	.182	.727	1.1	1.7	.4	.3	1.6

^{a} Statistics with the Denver Nuggets.

=== Playoffs ===
Player	GP	GS	MPG	FG%	3P%	FT%	RPG	APG	SPG	BPG	PPG
Arron Afflalo	7	7	32.7	.405	.200	.800	3.6	2.7	.7	.3	10.9
Corey Brewer	7	0	16.6	.426	.300	.750	2.0	.9	1.0	.3	8.3
Kenneth Faried	7	7	27.4	.533		.750	10.0	.6	.7	1.1	10.4
Danilo Gallinari	7	7	31.7	.362	.174	.917	5.1	2.4	.7	.6	13.4
Jordan Hamilton	2	0	2.5	.667			.0	.0	.5	.0	2.0
Al Harrington	7	0	23.3	.320	.286	.667	4.3	.9	.4	.1	9.7
Kosta Koufos	3	2	8.7	.333			3.7	.0	.0	.1	.7
Ty Lawson	7	7	34.6	.514	.321	.632	2.6	6.0	1.0	.1	19.0
JaVale McGee	7	0	25.9	.434		.538	9.6	.7	.7	3.1	8.6
Andre Miller	7	0	28.6	.425	.571	.867	5.6	6.0	1.3	.1	11.3
Timofey Mozgov	7	5	14.1	.480		.500	3.3	.4	.3	.9	4.0
Julyan Stone	2	0	2.5	.500			.5	1.0	.0	.0	1.0

== Awards ==
- Ty Lawson was named Western Conference Player of the Week (February 27 – March 4).
- Kenneth Faried was named Western Conference Rookie of the Month for March and was selected to the NBA All-Rookie First Team.

== Injuries and disciplinary actions ==
- Before the start of the postseason, Wilson Chandler had a labral tear in his hip and was out for the remainder of the season.
- Arron Afflalo earned a 1-game suspension for throwing an elbow at an opponent during a game against the Utah Jazz on March 23.

== Transactions ==
=== Overview ===
Players Added

Via draft

- Kenneth Faried

Via free agency

- DeMarre Carroll (later waived)
- Julyan Stone (Undrafted)

Via trade

- Corey Brewer
- Rudy Fernández
- JaVale McGee
- Andre Miller
Players Lost

Via trade

- Raymond Felton
- Nenê

Via free agency

- Melvin Ely
- Gary Forbes
- Kenyon Martin
- J. R. Smith

Waived

- Cory Higgins
- Ronny Turiaf (acquired in trade)

=== Trades ===
June 23, 2011	To Denver Nuggets Andre Miller; Draft rights to Jordan Hamilton (from Mavericks)	To Dallas Mavericks Rudy Fernández; Draft rights to Petteri Koponen (from Trail Blazers) To Portland Trail Blazers Raymond Felton; Draft rights to Tanguy Ngombo (from Mavericks)
June 23, 2011	To Denver Nuggets Draft rights to Chukwudiebere Maduabum	To Los Angeles Lakers Future second round pick
December 13, 2011	To Denver Nuggets Corey Brewer; Rudy Fernández	To Dallas Mavericks Future second round pick
March 15, 2012	To Denver Nuggets JaVale McGee; Ronny Turiaf; Future second round pick (from Clippers)	To Los Angeles Clippers Nick Young To Washington Wizards Nenê; Brian Cook; Conditional 2015 second round pick (from Clippers)

=== Free agents ===
Additions
Player	Date signed	Former team
Julyan Stone	December 9	UTEP (undrafted rookie)
DeMarre Carroll	December 13	Houston Rockets
Nenê	December 14	Re-signed (later traded to Washington)
Arron Afflalo	December 20	Re-signed
Wilson Chandler	March 18	Re-signed

Subtractions
Player	Date signed	New team
J. R. Smith	September 13	Zhejiang Golden Bulls (China) (later signed with the New York Knicks)
Kenyon Martin	September 21	Xinjiang Flying Tigers (China) (later signed with the Los Angeles Clippers)
Melvin Ely	December 14	Charlotte Bobcats
Gary Forbes	December 14	Toronto Raptors

Many players signed with teams from other leagues due to the 2011 NBA lockout. FIBA allows players under NBA contracts to sign and play for teams from other leagues if the contracts have opt-out clauses that allow the players to return to the NBA if the lockout ends. The Chinese Basketball Association, however, only allows its clubs to sign foreign free agents who could play for at least the entire season.

Played in other leagues during lockout
Player	Date signed	New team	Opt-out clause
Timofey Mozgov	July 21	BC Khimki (Russia)	Yes
Ty Lawson	August 15	Žalgiris Kaunas (Lithuania)	Yes
Wilson Chandler	August 29	Zhejiang Lions (China)	No
J. R. Smith	September 13	Zhejiang Golden Bulls (China)	No
Danilo Gallinari	September 20	Armani Milano (Italy)	Yes
Kenyon Martin	September 21	Xinjiang Flying Tigers (China)	No
