= Brendan Haywood =

American basketball player (born 1979)

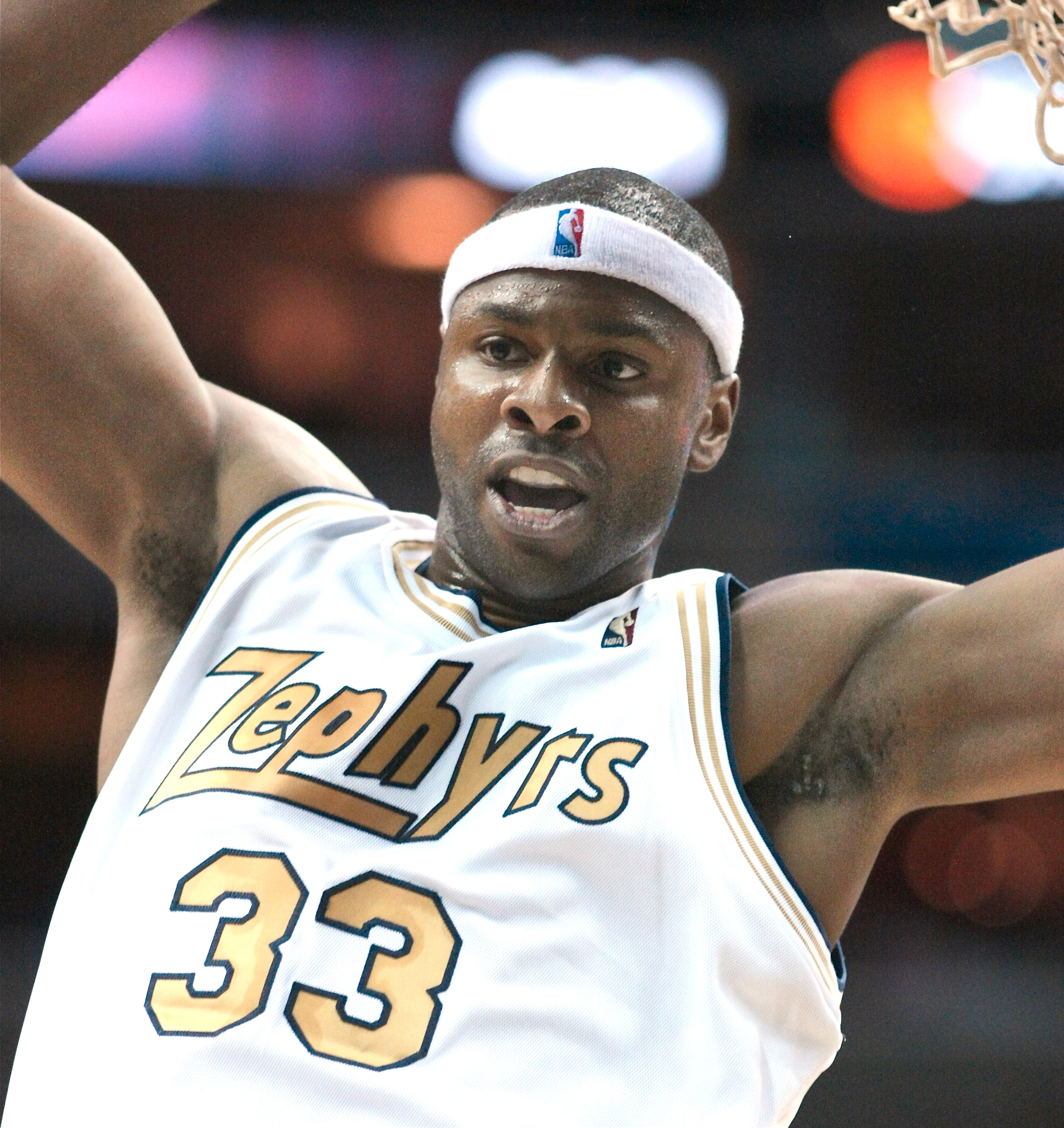
- Haywood with the Washington Wizards in 2009

Personal information
- Born: November 27, 1979 (age 46) New York City, New York, U.S.
- Listed height: 7 ft 0 in (2.13 m)
- Listed weight: 263 lb (119 kg)

Career information
- High school: James B. Dudley (Greensboro, North Carolina)
- College: North Carolina (1997–2001)
- NBA draft: 2001: 1st round, 20th overall pick
- Drafted by: Cleveland Cavaliers
- Playing career: 2001–2015
- Position: Center
- Number: 3, 00, 33

Career history
- 2001–2010: Washington Wizards
- 2010–2012: Dallas Mavericks
- 2012–2014: Charlotte Bobcats
- 2014–2015: Cleveland Cavaliers

Career highlights
- NBA champion (2011); Second-team All-American – SN (2001); Third-team All-American – NABC (2001); Second-team All-ACC (2001); Third-team All-ACC (2000); ACC All-Defensive Team (2001); No. 00 honored by North Carolina Tar Heels; Third-team Parade All-American (1997); McDonald's All-American (1997)

Career statistics
- Points: 5,538 (6.8 ppg)
- Rebounds: 4,875 (6.0 rpg)
- Assists: 442 (0.5 apg)
- Stats at NBA.com
- Stats at Basketball Reference
Medals
Men's basketball
Representing United States
Summer Universiade
Gold medal – first place	1999 Palma	Team competition

Brendan Todd Haywood (born November 27, 1979) is an American former professional basketball player who was a center in the National Basketball Association (NBA). He won an NBA championship with the Dallas Mavericks in 2011. Following his playing career, Haywood became a college basketball announcer for CBS Sports and a co-host/analyst on SiriusXM NBA Radio. Brendan Haywood also works as an analyst for the NBA Playoffs on NBATV.

== College career ==
As a senior at James B. Dudley High School in Greensboro, North Carolina, Haywood won the Gatorade North Carolina Basketball Player of the Year. He was named to the 1997 McDonald's All-American Team.

After graduation, Haywood enrolled at the University of North Carolina at Chapel Hill for the 1997–98 season. Haywood was recruited by legendary Tar Heel basketball coach Dean Smith, but the coach retired shortly after Haywood's arrival on campus and turned the job over to his assistant, Bill Guthridge. Haywood backed up Makhtar N'Diaye at the center position his freshman season, and was the most-used bench player after the six rotating starters (Antawn Jamison, Vince Carter, Shammond Williams, Ed Cota, Ademola Okulaja, and N'Diaye). That season, the Tar Heels advanced to the National Semifinals of the 1998 NCAA Men's Division I Basketball Tournament.

Haywood moved into the starting lineup during his sophomore season, and the Tar Heels earned a #3 seed in the 1999 NCAA tournament, but were eliminated in the first round. The Tar Heels struggled again during the 1999–2000 season, but experienced a resurgence during the 2000 NCAA tournament, reaching the Final Four. The 2000–01 season was Haywood's last at UNC and the first for new head coach Matt Doherty. That season the Tar Heels earned a #2 seed in the 2001 NCAA tournament, but were eliminated in the second round.

At UNC, Haywood recorded the first triple-double in school history against the University of Miami on December 4, 2000, with 18 points, 14 rebounds, and 10 blocks (which was also a UNC record). He also finished his college basketball career as the Atlantic Coast Conference's all-time leader in field goal percentage (63.7%) and is the Tar Heels' all-time leader in blocked shots (304). During his senior year, Haywood was named to the All-Atlantic Coast Conference 2nd Team, and also was named 2nd Team All-America by the Sporting News.

== NBA career ==
=== Washington Wizards (2001–2010) ===
Haywood was selected by the Cleveland Cavaliers with the 20th overall pick in the 2001 NBA draft. He was later traded to the Orlando Magic in exchange for Michael Doleac, who in turn traded him to the Washington Wizards in exchange for Laron Profit and a first-round draft pick. After playing as the Wizards' starting center for the bulk of six years, Haywood began putting up career numbers in the 2007–08 season.

=== Dallas Mavericks (2010–2012) ===
On February 13, 2010, Haywood was traded to the Dallas Mavericks along with Caron Butler and DeShawn Stevenson for Josh Howard, Drew Gooden, James Singleton, and Quinton Ross. On July 9, 2010, Haywood re-signed with the Mavericks to a reported six-year, $55 million deal. The Mavericks went on to win the 2011 NBA championship. On July 12, 2012, Haywood was waived by the Mavericks under the league's amnesty clause.

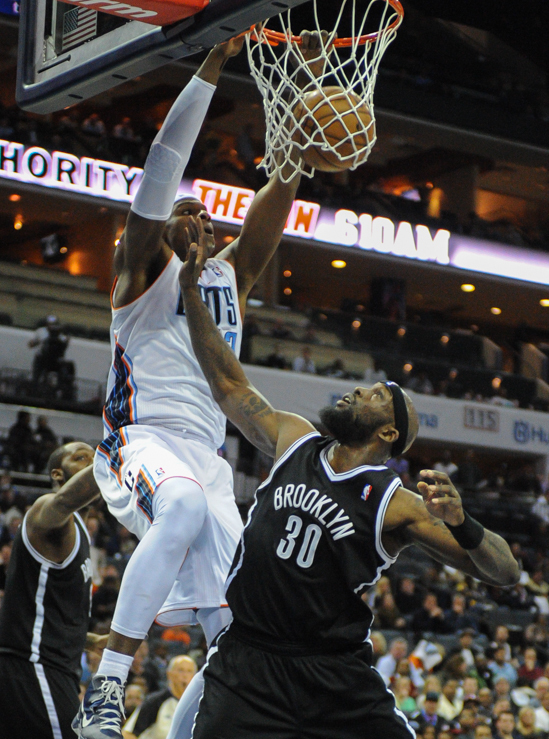
Haywood dunks on Reggie Evans, 2013

=== Charlotte Bobcats (2012–2014) ===
On July 14, 2012, Haywood was claimed off waivers by the Charlotte Bobcats. He missed the entire 2013–14 season due to a stress fracture in his foot.

=== Cleveland Cavaliers (2014–2015) ===
On July 12, 2014, Haywood was traded, along with the drafts right to Dwight Powell, to the Cleveland Cavaliers in exchange for Scotty Hopson and cash considerations. Haywood's final NBA game was played in Game 4 of the 2015 Eastern Conference Finals on May 26, 2015. In that game, Cleveland completed a 4–0 sweep over the Atlanta Hawks, winning the game 118 – 88, with Haywood only playing for 2 minutes, missing his only jumpshot and recording no other stats. That 2 minutes was the only playing time Haywood saw during the 2015 Playoffs with the Cavs. Cleveland advanced to the Finals, but eventually lost to the Golden State Warriors in six games.

On July 27, 2015, Haywood was traded, along with Mike Miller and two future second-round draft picks, to the Portland Trail Blazers in exchange for cash considerations. However, the Blazers waived him three days later.

== NBA career statistics ==
Legend
GP	Games played	GS	Games started	MPG	Minutes per game
FG%	Field goal percentage	3P%	3-point field goal percentage	FT%	Free throw percentage
RPG	Rebounds per game	APG	Assists per game	SPG	Steals per game
BPG	Blocks per game	PPG	Points per game	**Bold**	Career high
†	Won an NBA championship

=== Regular season ===
Year	Team	GP	GS	MPG	FG%	3P%	FT%	RPG	APG	SPG	BPG	PPG
2001–02	Washington	62	2	20.4	.493	.000	.606	5.2	.5	.3	1.5	5.1
2002–03	Washington	**81**	69	23.8	.510	.000	.633	5.0	.4	.4	1.5	6.2
2003–04	Washington	77	59	19.3	.515	.000	.585	5.0	.6	.4	1.3	7.0
2004–05	Washington	68	68	27.4	.560	.000	.609	6.8	.8	**.8**	1.7	9.4
2005–06	Washington	79	70	23.8	.514	.000	.585	5.9	.6	.4	1.3	7.3
2006–07	Washington	77	49	22.6	.558	.000	.548	6.2	.6	.4	1.1	6.6
2007–08	Washington	80	**80**	27.9	.528	.000	**.735**	7.2	.9	.4	1.7	**10.6**
2008–09	Washington	6	5	29.2	.480	.000	.476	7.3	**1.3**	.7	**2.5**	9.7
2009–10	Washington	49	48	**32.9**	.561	.000	.646	**10.3**	.4	.4	2.1	9.8
2009–10	Dallas	28	19	26.5	.564	.000	.575	7.4	.9	.3	2.0	8.1
2010–11†	Dallas	72	8	18.5	.**574**	.000	.362	5.2	.3	.2	1.0	4.4
2011–12	Dallas	54	54	21.2	.518	.000	.469	6.0	.4	.4	1.0	5.2
2012–13	Charlotte	61	17	19.0	.431	.000	.455	4.8	.5	.3	.8	3.5
2014–15	Cleveland	22	1	5.4	.467	.000	.538	1.3	.1	.1	.5	1.6
Career		816	549	22.9	.528	.000	.587	6.0	.5	.4	1.4	6.8

=== Playoffs ===
Year	Team	GP	GS	MPG	FG%	3P%	FT%	RPG	APG	SPG	BPG	PPG
2005	Washington	10	**10**	29.6	.542	.000	.636	**7.6**	**1.0**	**1.4**	**2.0**	10.6
2006	Washington	6	6	25.8	.682	.000	.520	3.2	.8	.3	1.8	7.2
2007	Washington	3	0	11.3	**.714**	.000	.750	1.7	.3	.3	.0	4.3
2008	Washington	6	6	**29.7**	.591	.000	**.800**	6.7	.8	.7	1.5	**12.0**
2010	Dallas	6	2	23.2	.571	.000	.600	6.2	.5	1.2	1.7	6.0
2011†	Dallas	**18**	0	15.3	.581	.000	.465	4.1	.2	.1	1.0	3.1
2012	Dallas	4	4	15.3	.286	.000	.625	3.3	.3	.3	.5	3.3
Career		53	28	21.4	.564	.000	.598	5.0	.5	.6	1.3	6.4

== Broadcast career ==
After Haywood retired from the NBA, he became an analyst and a broadcaster for NBA TV. He also worked as an analyst for NBATV and TNT's coverage of the first round of the 2021 NBA playoffs.Haywood now broadcasts Wizards games for Monumental Sports.
