= 2011–12 Houston Rockets season =

- Head coach: Kevin McHale
- General manager: Daryl Morey
- Owners: Leslie Alexander
- Arena: Toyota Center

Results
- Record: 34–32 (.515)
- Place: Division: 4th (Southwest); Conference: 9th (Western)
- Playoff finish: Did not qualify
- Stats at Basketball Reference

Local media
- Television: FS Houston, KTXH
- Radio: Sports Radio 610

The 2011–12 Houston Rockets season was the 45th season of the franchise in the National Basketball Association (NBA) and the 41st based in Houston. This was the first season since 2001–02 without Yao Ming, who retired from the NBA on July 9, 2011. The off-season saw team draft a pair of first-round picks, forward Marcus Morris from Kansas was drafted 14th overall and Madrid sensation Nikola Mirotić was drafted 23rd overall. Forward and 3-point specialist Chandler Parsons from Florida was taken with the 38th pick in the second round. The season is most memorable when ex-Celtic and former Timberwolves general manager Kevin McHale was hired to be their new head coach for the upcoming season. The Rockets finished with a 34–32 record, missing the playoffs.

== Key dates ==
- June 23: The 2011 NBA draft took place at Prudential Center in Newark, New Jersey.
- July 9: Yao Ming announced his retirement from professional basketball.

== Draft picks ==
Round	Pick	Player	Position	Nationality	College/Team
1	14	Marcus Morris	PF	United States	Kansas
1	23	Nikola Mirotić	PF	Spain	Real Madrid
2	38	Chandler Parsons	SF	United States	University of Florida

== Roster ==
2011–12 Houston Rockets roster
Players

Pos.	No.	Player	Height	Weight	DOB	From
G	6	Earl Boykins	5 ft 5 in (1.65 m)	133 lb (60 kg)	1976–06–02	Eastern Michigan
F	10	Chase Budinger	6 ft 7 in (2.01 m)	218 lb (99 kg)	1988–05–22	Arizona
C	29	Marcus Camby	6 ft 11 in (2.11 m)	235 lb (107 kg)	1974–03–22	UMass
C	21	Samuel Dalembert	6 ft 11 in (2.11 m)	250 lb (113 kg)	1981–05–10	Seton Hall
G	3	Goran Dragić	6 ft 3 in (1.91 m)	190 lb (86 kg)	1986–05–06	Slovenia
G	9	Courtney Fortson (DL)	5 ft 11 in (1.80 m)	185 lb (84 kg)	1988–05–23	Arkansas
G/F	5	Courtney Lee	6 ft 5 in (1.96 m)	200 lb (91 kg)	1985–10–03	Western Kentucky
G	7	Kyle Lowry	6 ft 0 in (1.83 m)	205 lb (93 kg)	1986–03–25	Villanova
SG	12	Kevin Martin	6 ft 7 in (2.01 m)	185 lb (84 kg)	1983–02–01	Western Carolina
F	2	Marcus Morris	6 ft 9 in (2.06 m)	235 lb (107 kg)	1989–02–09	Kansas
F	25	Chandler Parsons	6 ft 8 in (2.03 m)	227 lb (103 kg)	1988–10–25	Florida
PF	54	Patrick Patterson	6 ft 9 in (2.06 m)	235 lb (107 kg)	1989–03–14	Kentucky
F/C	4	Luis Scola	6 ft 9 in (2.06 m)	245 lb (111 kg)	1980–04–30	Argentina
F	20	Diamon Simpson	6 ft 7 in (2.01 m)	230 lb (104 kg)	1987-09-08	Saint Mary's College of California
F/C	0	Greg Smith (DL)	6 ft 10 in (2.08 m)	250 lb (113 kg)	1991–01–08	Fresno State

Coaches
Head coach
- Kevin McHale
Assistant(s)
- Kelvin Sampson
- J. B. Bickerstaff
- Chris Finch
- Brett Gunning
- Greg Buckner

Legend
- (DP) Unsigned draft pick
- (FA) Free agent
- (S) Suspended
- (DL) On assignment to D-League affiliate
- Injured

Roster
Updated: 2012–04–06

== Pre-season ==
Due to the 2011 NBA lockout negotiations, the programmed pre-season schedule, along with the first two weeks of the regular season were scrapped, and a two-game pre-season was set for each team once the lockout concluded.

2011 pre-season game log
Pre-season: 1–1 (home: 1–0; road: 0–1)

Game	Date	Team	Score	High points	High rebounds	High assists	Location Attendance	Record
1	December 17	San Antonio	W 101–87	Luis Scola (20)	Jordan Hill (13)	Kyle Lowry (5)	Toyota Center; 12,859	1–0
2	December 21	@ San Antonio	L 95–97	Marcus Morris (20)	Jordan Hill (8)	Jonny Flynn (6)	AT&T Center; 17,323	1–1

2011–12 season schedule

== Regular season ==
=== Standings ===
Southwest Division	W	L	PCT	GB	Home	Road	Div	GP
c-San Antonio Spurs	50	16	.758	–	28‍–‍5	22‍–‍11	12–4	66
x-Memphis Grizzlies	41	25	.621	9.0	26‍–‍7	15‍–‍18	7–8	66
x-Dallas Mavericks	36	30	.545	14.0	23‍–‍10	13‍–‍20	8–5	66
Houston Rockets	34	32	.515	16.0	22‍–‍11	12‍–‍21	6–8	66
New Orleans Hornets	21	45	.318	29.0	11‍–‍22	10‍–‍23	3–11	66

Western Conference
#	Team	W	L	PCT	GB	GP
1	c-San Antonio Spurs *	50	16	.758	–	66
2	y-Oklahoma City Thunder *	47	19	.712	3.0	66
3	y-Los Angeles Lakers *	41	25	.621	9.0	66
4	x-Memphis Grizzlies	41	25	.621	9.0	66
5	x-Los Angeles Clippers	40	26	.606	10.0	66
6	x-Denver Nuggets	38	28	.576	12.0	66
7	x-Dallas Mavericks	36	30	.545	14.0	66
8	x-Utah Jazz	36	30	.545	14.0	66
9	Houston Rockets	34	32	.515	16.0	66
10	Phoenix Suns	33	33	.500	17.0	66
11	Portland Trail Blazers	28	38	.424	22.0	66
12	Minnesota Timberwolves	26	40	.394	24.0	66
13	Golden State Warriors	23	43	.348	27.0	66
14	Sacramento Kings	22	44	.333	28.0	66
15	New Orleans Hornets	21	45	.318	29.0	66

== Player statistics ==
Legend
GP	Games played	GS	Games started	MPG	Minutes per game
FG%	Field-goal percentage	3P%	3-point field-goal percentage	FT%	Free-throw percentage
RPG	Rebounds per game	APG	Assists per game	SPG	Steals per game
BPG	Blocks per game	PPG	Points per game

=== Regular season ===
Houston Rockets statistics
Player	GP	GS	MPG	FG%	3P%	FT%	RPG	APG	SPG	BPG	PPG
Luis Scola	66	66	31.3	.491	.000	.773	6.5	2.1	.5	.4	15.5
Goran Dragić	66	28	26.5	.462	.337	.805	2.5	5.3	1.3	.2	11.7
Samuel Dalembert	65	45	22.2	.506	.000	.796	7.0	.5	.6	1.7	7.5
Patrick Patterson	64	1	23.2	.440	.000	.702	4.5	.8	.4	.6	7.7
Chandler Parsons	63	57	28.6	.452	.337	.551	4.8	2.1	1.2	.5	9.5
Courtney Lee	58	26	30.3	.433	.401	.826	2.7	1.5	1.2	.4	11.4
Chase Budinger	58	9	22.4	.442	.402	.771	3.7	1.3	.5	.1	9.6
Kyle Lowry	47	38	32.1	.409	.374	.864	4.5	6.6	1.6	.3	14.3
Kevin Martin	40	40	31.6	.413	.347	.894	2.7	2.8	.7	.1	17.1
Jordan Hill^{†}	32	7	14.7	.504	.000	.641	4.8	.4	.3	.7	5.0
Marcus Camby^{†}	19	13	24.1	.484	.400	.423	9.3	1.7	.9	1.5	7.1
Marcus Morris Sr.	17	0	7.4	.296	.118	.750	.9	.2	.1	.1	2.4
Terrence Williams^{†}	12	0	15.1	.351	.421	.500	2.3	.8	.3	.1	4.5
Jonny Flynn^{†}	11	0	12.3	.293	.222	.786	.7	2.5	.3	.1	3.4
Earl Boykins	8	0	13.9	.333	.222	.867	1.4	2.1	.1	.0	4.9
Greg Smith	8	0	8.6	.636			2.5	.1	.3	.6	1.8
Jeff Adrien	8	0	7.9	.438		.583	2.8	.1	.0	.3	2.6
Courtney Fortson^{†}	6	0	8.2	.300	.222	.667	1.2	.8	.5	.0	3.0
Hasheem Thabeet^{†}	5	0	4.6	1.000			1.4	.0	.0	.4	1.2

- ^{†} Denotes player spent time with another team in the season. Stats reflect time with the Rockets only.
