= 2011–12 Utah Jazz season =

NBA professional basketball team season

- Head coach: Tyrone Corbin
- General manager: Kevin O'Connor
- Owner: Gail Miller
- Arena: EnergySolutions Arena

Results
- Record: 36–30 (.545)
- Place: Division: 3rd (Northwest); Conference: 8th (Western)
- Playoff finish: First round (lost to Spurs 0–4)
- Stats at Basketball Reference

Local media
- Television: Root Sports Utah
- Radio: KFNZ; KBEE

The 2011–12 Utah Jazz season is the franchise's 38th overall in the National Basketball Association (NBA), and the 33rd season of the franchise in Salt Lake City. This for first time since 2000-01 season Andrei Kirilenko was not on the opening day roster and for the first full season since 2004-05 season Deron Williams was not on the roster.

With a mediocre 36–30 record, the Jazz made the playoffs for the first time since 1988 without Jerry Sloan, who retired last year. However, the Jazz were quickly eliminated from the playoffs as they were overpowered by the San Antonio Spurs, who swept them in four games.

The Jazz would not return to the playoffs until 2017.

== Key dates ==
- June 23: The 2011 NBA draft took place at Prudential Center in Newark, New Jersey.

== Roster ==
2011–12 Utah Jazz roster
Players

Pos.	No.	Player	Height	Weight	DOB	From
PG	2	Blake Ahearn	6 ft 2 in (1.88 m)	190 lb (86 kg)	1984-05-27	Missouri State
SG	19	Raja Bell	6 ft 5 in (1.96 m)	210 lb (95 kg)	1976-09-19	FIU
SG	10	Alec Burks	6 ft 6 in (1.98 m)	202 lb (92 kg)	1991-07-20	Colorado
SF	3	DeMarre Carroll	6 ft 8 in (2.03 m)	212 lb (96 kg)	1986-07-27	Missouri
SF	40	Jeremy Evans	6 ft 9 in (2.06 m)	194 lb (88 kg)	1987-10-24	Western Kentucky
PF	15	Derrick Favors	6 ft 10 in (2.08 m)	248 lb (112 kg)	1991-07-15	Georgia Tech
PG	5	Devin Harris	6 ft 3 in (1.91 m)	192 lb (87 kg)	1983-02-27	Wisconsin
SF	20	Gordon Hayward	6 ft 8 in (2.03 m)	210 lb (95 kg)	1990-03-23	Butler
SF	8	Josh Howard	6 ft 7 in (2.01 m)	210 lb (95 kg)	1980-04-28	Wake Forest
C	25	Al Jefferson	6 ft 10 in (2.08 m)	289 lb (131 kg)	1985-01-04	Prentiss HS (MS)
C	0	Enes Kanter	6 ft 11 in (2.11 m)	267 lb (121 kg)	1992-05-20	Turkey
SG	34	C. J. Miles	6 ft 6 in (1.98 m)	222 lb (101 kg)	1987-03-18	Skyline HS (TX)
PF	24	Paul Millsap	6 ft 8 in (2.03 m)	253 lb (115 kg)	1985-02-10	Louisiana Tech
PG	6	Jamaal Tinsley	6 ft 3 in (1.91 m)	197 lb (89 kg)	1978-02-28	Iowa State
PG	11	Earl Watson	6 ft 1 in (1.85 m)	199 lb (90 kg)	1979-06-12	UCLA

Coaches
Head coach
- Tyrone Corbin
Assistant(s)
- Jeff Hornacek
- Scott Layden
- Sidney Lowe
- Mark McKown

Legend
- (DP) Unsigned draft pick
- (FA) Free agent
- (S) Suspended
- Injured

Roster
Updated: April 9, 2012

== Pre-season ==
=== Game log ===
2011 pre-season game log
Pre-season: 1–1 (home: 1–0; road: 0–1)

Game	Date	Team	Score	High points	High rebounds	High assists	Location Attendance	Record
1	December 19	@ Portland	L 90–110	Derrick Favors (25)	Derrick Favors (12)	Earl Watson (5)	Rose Garden; 19,997	0–1
2	December 21	Portland	W 92–89	C.J. Miles (17)	C.J. Miles; Al Jefferson (9)	Jamaal Tinsley; Al Jefferson (3)	EnergySolutions Arena; 15,367	1–1

2011–12 season schedule

== Regular season ==
=== Standings ===
Northwest Division	W	L	PCT	GB	Home	Road	Div	GP
y-Oklahoma City Thunder	47	19	.712	–	26‍–‍7	21‍–‍12	10–3	66
x-Denver Nuggets	38	28	.576	9.0	20‍–‍13	18‍–‍15	6–7	66
x-Utah Jazz	36	30	.545	11.0	25‍–‍8	11‍–‍22	9–4	66
Portland Trail Blazers	28	38	.424	19.0	20‍–‍13	8‍–‍25	4–10	66
Minnesota Timberwolves	26	40	.394	21.0	13‍–‍20	13‍–‍20	4–9	66

Western Conference
#	Team	W	L	PCT	GB	GP
1	c-San Antonio Spurs *	50	16	.758	–	66
2	y-Oklahoma City Thunder *	47	19	.712	3.0	66
3	y-Los Angeles Lakers *	41	25	.621	9.0	66
4	x-Memphis Grizzlies	41	25	.621	9.0	66
5	x-Los Angeles Clippers	40	26	.606	10.0	66
6	x-Denver Nuggets	38	28	.576	12.0	66
7	x-Dallas Mavericks	36	30	.545	14.0	66
8	x-Utah Jazz	36	30	.545	14.0	66
9	Houston Rockets	34	32	.515	16.0	66
10	Phoenix Suns	33	33	.500	17.0	66
11	Portland Trail Blazers	28	38	.424	22.0	66
12	Minnesota Timberwolves	26	40	.394	24.0	66
13	Golden State Warriors	23	43	.348	27.0	66
14	Sacramento Kings	22	44	.333	28.0	66
15	New Orleans Hornets	21	45	.318	29.0	66

=== Game log ===
2011–12 game log
Total: 36–30 (home: 25–8; road: 11–22)
December: 1–3 (home: 1–0; road: 0–3)

Game	Date	Team	Score	High points	High rebounds	High assists	Location Attendance	Record
1	December 27	@ L. A. Lakers	L 71–96	Paul Millsap (18)	Enes Kanter (11)	Devin Harris (6)	Staples Center; 18,997	0–1
2	December 28	@ Denver	L 100–117	Al Jefferson (19)	Derrick Favors (10)	Gordon Hayward (7)	Pepsi Center; 19,155	0–2
3	December 30	Philadelphia	W 102–99	Derrick Favors (20)	Paul Millsap (14)	Earl Watson (4)	EnergySolutions Arena; 19,911	1–2
4	December 31	@ San Antonio	L 89–104	Al Jefferson (21)	Al Jefferson (11)	Gordon Hayward (4)	AT&T Center; 17,769	1–3

January: 11–4 (home: 9–3; road: 2–1)

Game	Date	Team	Score	High points	High rebounds	High assists	Location Attendance	Record
5	January 2	New Orleans	W 94–90	Al Jefferson (22)	Al Jefferson; Paul Millsap (6)	Earl Watson (7)	EnergySolutions Arena; 19,159	2–3
6	January 3	Milwaukee	W 85–73	Al Jefferson (26)	Paul Millsap (12)	Earl Watson (8)	EnergySolutions Arena; 17,756	3–3
7	January 6	Memphis	W 94–85	Al Jefferson (20)	Al Jefferson (9)	Earl Watson (5)	EnergySolutions Arena; 19,503	4–3
8	January 7	@ Golden State	W 88–87	Gordon Hayward (18)	Derrick Favors (10)	Devin Harris (8)	Oracle Arena; 19,596	5–3
9	January 10	Cleveland	W 113–105	Al Jefferson (30)	Al Jefferson (12)	Gordon Hayward (8)	EnergySolutions Arena; 17,859	6–3
10	January 11	L. A. Lakers	L 87–90 (OT)	Paul Millsap (29)	Al Jefferson (11)	Devin Harris; Gordon Hayward (5)	EnergySolutions Arena; 19,642	6–4
11	January 14	New Jersey	W 107–94	Al Jefferson (20)	Paul Millsap (12)	Devin Harris (6)	EnergySolutions Arena; 19,557	7–4
12	January 15	@ Denver	W 106–96	Paul Millsap (26)	Al Jefferson; Paul Millsap (12)	Devin Harris; Earl Watson (7)	Pepsi Center; 16,208	8–4
13	January 17	L. A. Clippers	W 108–79	Paul Millsap (20)	Al Jefferson (13)	Devin Harris; Al Jefferson (4)	EnergySolutions Arena; 19,371	9–4
14	January 19	Dallas	L 91–94	Al Jefferson (22)	Paul Millsap (13)	Earl Watson (7)	EnergySolutions Arena; 19,911	9–5
15	January 21	Minnesota	W 108–98	Paul Millsap (26)	Al Jefferson (12)	Earl Watson (7)	EnergySolutions Arena; 19,911	10–5
16	January 25	Toronto	L 106–111 (OT)	Paul Millsap (31)	Derrick Favors (12)	Devin Harris (6)	EnergySolutions Arena; 19,802	10–6
17	January 27	@ Dallas	L 101–116	Paul Millsap (20)	Enes Kanter; Paul Millsap (7)	Gordon Hayward (6)	American Airlines Center; 20,096	10–7
18	January 28	Sacramento	W 96–93	Gordon Hayward (21)	Paul Millsap (14)	Devin Harris (6)	EnergySolutions Arena; 19,911	11–7
19	January 30	Portland	W 93–89	Paul Millsap (19)	Paul Millsap (15)	Three players (4)	EnergySolutions Arena; 19,328	12–7

February: 4–11 (home: 3–3; road: 1–8)

Game	Date	Team	Score	High points	High rebounds	High assists	Location Attendance	Record
20	February 1	L. A. Clippers	L 105–107	Al Jefferson (27)	Al Jefferson (12)	Earl Watson (8)	EnergySolutions Arena; 19,637	12–8
21	February 2	@ Golden State	L 101–119	Gordon Hayward (21)	Paul Millsap (11)	Jamaal Tinsley (13)	Oracle Arena; 18,123	12–9
22	February 4	L. A. Lakers	W 95–87	Al Jefferson (18)	Al Jefferson; Paul Millsap (13)	Earl Watson (11)	EnergySolutions Arena; 19,642	13–9
23	February 6	@ New York	L 88–99	Al Jefferson (22)	Paul Millsap (13)	Devin Harris; Gordon Hayward (4)	Madison Square Garden; 19,763	13–10
24	February 7	@ Indiana	L 99–104	Paul Millsap (18)	Paul Millsap (10)	Earl Watson (7)	Bankers Life Fieldhouse; 11,006	13–11
25	February 10	Oklahoma City	L 87–101	Al Jefferson (20)	Paul Millsap (9)	Devin Harris (7)	EnergySolutions Arena; 19,911	13–12
26	February 12	@ Memphis	W 98–88	Gordon Hayward (23)	Al Jefferson (15)	Gordon Hayward; Earl Watson (5)	FedExForum; 14,234	14–12
27	February 13	@ New Orleans	L 80–86	Derrick Favors; Al Jefferson (14)	Al Jefferson; Enes Kanter (12)	Earl Watson (5)	New Orleans Arena; 13,562	14–13
28	February 14	@ Oklahoma City	L 85–111	Al Jefferson (15)	Paul Millsap (8)	Earl Watson (6)	Chesapeake Energy Arena; 18,203	14–14
29	February 17	Washington	W 114–100	Al Jefferson (34)	Al Jefferson; Paul Millsap (12)	Devin Harris (9)	EnergySolutions Arena; 18,719	15–14
30	February 19	@ Houston	L 85–101	Al Jefferson (23)	Al Jefferson (11)	Devin Harris; Gordon Hayward (4)	Toyota Center; 16,764	15–15
31	February 20	San Antonio	L 102–106	Al Jefferson (20)	Al Jefferson; Paul Millsap (11)	Devin Harris (4)	EnergySolutions Arena; 19,105	15–16
32	February 22	@ Minnesota	L 98–100	Paul Millsap (25)	Al Jefferson (11)	Devin Harris (8)	Target Center; 18,776	15–17
All-Star Break
33	February 28	@ Sacramento	L 96–103	Devin Harris (18)	Derrick Favors (11)	Devin Harris (7)	Power Balance Pavilion; 13,896	15–18
34	February 29	Houston	W 104–83	CJ Miles (27)	Al Jefferson (10)	Earl Watson (8)	EnergySolutions Arena; 18,816	16–18

March: 11–8 (home: 6–1; road: 5–7)

Game	Date	Team	Score	High points	High rebounds	High assists	Location Attendance	Record
35	March 2	Miami	W 99–98	Al Jefferson (20)	Josh Howard (9)	Earl Watson (7)	EnergySolutions Arena; 19,911	17–18
36	March 3	@ Dallas	L 96–102	Paul Millsap (24)	Al Jefferson (10)	Devin Harris (5)	American Airlines Center; 20,560	17–19
37	March 5	@ Cleveland	W 109–100	Al Jefferson (25)	Al Jefferson (13)	Al Jefferson (7)	Quicken Loans Arena; 13,190	18–19
38	March 7	@ Charlotte	W 99–93	Al Jefferson (31)	Al Jefferson (9)	Al Jefferson; Earl Watson (5)	Time Warner Cable Arena; 10,891	19–19
39	March 9	@ Philadelphia	L 91–104	Paul Millsap (15)	Paul Millsap (9)	Earl Watson (5)	Wells Fargo Center; 18,512	19–20
40	March 10	@ Chicago	L 97–111	Paul Millsap (26)	Al Jefferson (8)	Jamaal Tinsley (10)	United Center; 22,158	19–21
41	March 12	Detroit	W 105–90	Al Jefferson (33)	Al Jefferson (12)	Devin Harris (8)	EnergySolutions Arena; 19,393	20–21
42	March 14	@ Phoenix	L 111–120	Al Jefferson; Paul Millsap (18)	Paul Millsap (10)	Jamaal Tinsley (8)	US Airways Center; 14,076	20–22
43	March 15	Minnesota	W 111–105 (OT)	Gordon Hayward (26)	Derrick Favors (16)	Jamaal Tinsley (5)	EnergySolutions Arena; 18,053	21–22
44	March 17	Golden State	W 99–92 (OT)	Derrick Favors (23)	Derrick Favors (17)	Devin Harris (5)	EnergySolutions Arena; 17,854	22–22
45	March 18	@ L. A. Lakers	W 103–99	Paul Millsap (24)	Derrick Favors (10)	Devin Harris (9)	Staples Center; 18,997	23–22
46	March 20	Oklahoma City	W 97–90	Paul Millsap (20)	Derrick Favors (9)	Devin Harris; Al Jefferson (4)	EnergySolutions Arena; 18,138	24–22
47	March 22	@ Sacramento	W 103–102	Al Jefferson (26)	Derrick Favors (10)	Jamaal Tinsley (8)	Power Balance Pavilion; 11,646	25–22
48	March 23	Denver	W 121–102	Al Jefferson (23)	Al Jefferson (8)	Devin Harris (9)	EnergySolutions Arena; 19,250	26–22
49	March 25	@ Atlanta	L 133–139 (4OT)	Al Jefferson (28)	Al Jefferson (17)	Devin Harris (10)	Philips Arena; 13,544	26–23
50	March 26	@ New Jersey	W 105–84	Paul Millsap (24)	Paul Millsap (13)	Devin Harris (11)	Prudential Center; 10,310	27–23
51	March 28	@ Boston	L 82–94	Gordon Hayward (19)	Al Jefferson (12)	Devin Harris (7)	TD Garden; 18,624	27–24
52	March 30	Sacramento	L 103–104	Al Jefferson (27)	Al Jefferson (16)	Earl Watson (7)	EnergySolutions Arena; 19,911	27–25
53	March 31	@ L. A. Clippers	L 96–105	Al Jefferson (26)	Paul Millsap (9)	Devin Harris (6)	Staples Center; 19,060	27–26

April: 9–4 (home: 6–1; road: 3–3)

Game	Date	Team	Score	High points	High rebounds	High assists	Location Attendance	Record
54	April 2	@ Portland	W 102–97	Paul Millsap (31)	Derrick Favors; Paul Millsap (11)	Jamaal Tinsley (6)	Rose Garden; 20,050	28–26
55	April 4	Phoenix	L 105–107	Paul Millsap (25)	Gordon Hayward (10)	Paul Millsap (6)	EnergySolutions Arena; 19,911	28–27
56	April 6	Golden State	W 104–98	Al Jefferson (30)	Al Jefferson (11)	Earl Watson (6)	EnergySolutions Arena; 18,933	29–27
57	April 8	@ San Antonio	L 104–114	Al Jefferson (19)	Derrick Favors (12)	Devin Harris (6)	AT&T Center; 18,581	29–28
58	April 9	San Antonio	W 91–84	Devin Harris (25)	Al Jefferson; Paul Millsap (10)	Devin Harris (6)	EnergySolutions Arena; 19,911	30–28
59	April 11	@ Houston	W 103–91	Gordon Hayward (29)	Derrick Favors (11)	Gordon Hayward (6)	Toyota Center; 18,273	31–28
60	April 13	@ New Orleans	L 85–96	Paul Millsap (27)	Derrick Favors (13)	Devin Harris (8)	New Orleans Arena; 16,326	31–29
61	April 14	@ Memphis	L 98–103	Devin Harris; Al Jefferson (20)	Derrick Favors (14)	Devin Harris (6)	FedExForum; 17,190	31–30
62	April 16	Dallas	W 123–121 (3OT)	Al Jefferson (28)	Al Jefferson (26)	Devin Harris (7)	EnergySolutions Arena; 19,363	32–30
63	April 18	@ Portland	W 112–91	Devin Harris (27)	Al Jefferson (10)	Alec Burks (5)	Rose Garden; 20,545	33–30
64	April 21	Orlando	W 117–107	Devin Harris; Al Jefferson (21)	Derrick Favors (11)	Jamaal Tinsley (9)	EnergySolutions Arena; 19,580	34–30
65	April 24	Phoenix	W 100–88	Paul Millsap (26)	Al Jefferson (16)	Gordon Hayward (8)	EnergySolutions Arena; 19,911	35–30
66	April 26	Portland	W 96–94	Alec Burks (18)	Jeremy Evans; Enes Kanter (10)	Jamaal Tinsley (7)	EnergySolutions Arena; 19,554	36–30

2011–12 season schedule

== Player statistics ==
Legend
GP	Games played	GS	Games started	MPG	Minutes per game
FG%	Field-goal percentage	3P%	3-point field-goal percentage	FT%	Free-throw percentage
RPG	Rebounds per game	APG	Assists per game	SPG	Steals per game
BPG	Blocks per game	PPG	Points per game

=== Regular season ===
Player	GP	GS	MPG	FG%	3P%	FT%	RPG	APG	SPG	BPG	PPG
Gordon Hayward	66	58	30.5	.456	.346	.832	3.5	3.1	.8	.6	11.8
Enes Kanter	66	0	13.2	.496	.000	.667	4.2	.1	.3	.3	4.6
Derrick Favors	65	9	21.2	.499		.649	6.5	.7	.6	1.0	8.8
Paul Millsap	64	62	32.8	.495	.226	.792	8.8	2.3	1.8	.8	16.6
Devin Harris	63	63	27.6	.445	.362	.746	1.8	5.0	1.0	.2	11.3
Al Jefferson	61	61	34.0	.492	.250	.774	9.6	2.2	.8	1.7	19.2
Alec Burks	59	0	15.9	.429	.333	.727	2.2	.9	.5	.1	7.2
C. J. Miles	56	14	20.4	.381	.307	.794	2.1	1.2	.8	.3	9.1
Earl Watson	50	2	20.7	.338	.192	.674	2.4	4.3	1.1	.4	3.0
Josh Howard	43	18	23.0	.399	.243	.773	3.7	1.2	.7	.2	8.7
Jamaal Tinsley	37	1	13.7	.404	.270	.765	1.2	3.3	.5	.2	3.7
Raja Bell	34	33	23.4	.466	.391	.840	1.4	1.1	.4	.1	6.4
Jeremy Evans	29	0	7.5	.643	.000	.500	1.7	.4	.2	.8	2.1
DeMarre Carroll^{†}	20	9	16.4	.374	.368	.875	2.5	.8	.6	.1	4.8
Blake Ahearn	4	0	7.5	.286	.222		.5	.3	.0	.0	2.5

=== Playoffs ===
Player	GP	GS	MPG	FG%	3P%	FT%	RPG	APG	SPG	BPG	PPG
Al Jefferson	4	4	35.3	.529	.000	.250	8.5	2.5	1.3	.8	18.3
Paul Millsap	4	4	34.8	.370	.000	.500	11.0	.5	.3	2.5	12.0
Gordon Hayward	4	4	30.8	.182	.083	1.000	2.8	3.0	.8	.0	7.3
Devin Harris	4	4	30.0	.396	.267	.714	1.5	3.8	.8	.5	13.0
Josh Howard	4	3	15.8	.294	.500	.800	3.5	1.0	.5	.3	3.8
Derrick Favors	4	1	29.0	.417		.586	9.5	.5	1.3	1.5	11.8
DeMarre Carroll	4	0	18.3	.474	.200		3.8	.8	.5	.3	4.8
Jamaal Tinsley	4	0	16.3	.250	.250	1.000	.5	3.0	.5	.0	3.8
Alec Burks	4	0	15.8	.250	.000	.857	2.8	.8	.5	.0	6.5
Enes Kanter	4	0	10.8	.438		.000	4.0	.3	.0	1.0	3.5
Blake Ahearn	3	0	2.7	.667	1.000		.0	.7	.0	.0	1.7
Jeremy Evans	2	0	3.5	.000		1.000	1.5	.5	.5	.0	1.0

- ^{†} Denotes player spent time with another team in the season. Stats reflect time with the Jazz only.
