= Southwest Division (NBA) =

Division of the National Basketball Association

- Conference: Western Conference
- League: National Basketball Association
- Sport: Basketball
- First season: 2004–05 season
- No. of teams: 5
- Most recent champions: San Antonio Spurs (10th title) (2025–26)
- Most titles: San Antonio Spurs (10 titles)

Southwest Division Teams Location

The Southwest Division is one of the three divisions in the Western Conference of the National Basketball Association (NBA). Despite its name, the division is actually located in the South Central United States. The division consists of five teams: the Dallas Mavericks, the Houston Rockets, the Memphis Grizzlies, the New Orleans Pelicans and the San Antonio Spurs. Three of the teams, the Mavericks, Rockets, and Spurs, are based in Texas.

Consisting of some of the most historically competitive teams in the NBA's Western Conference, the division was created at the start of the 2004–05 season, when the league expanded from 29 to 30 teams with the addition of the Charlotte Bobcats. The league realigned itself into three divisions in each conference. The Southwest Division began with five inaugural members, the Mavericks, the Rockets, the Grizzlies, the Hornets (now Pelicans) and the Spurs. The Mavericks, the Rockets, the Grizzlies and the Spurs joined from the now-defunct Midwest Division, while the Pelicans joined from the Central Division.

The Spurs have been dominant since the division's inaugural season, having won the most Southwest Division titles with ten. The Rockets have won five, the Mavericks have won four, the Grizzlies have won two and the Pelicans have won one title. Four NBA champions came from the Southwest Division. The Spurs won the NBA championship in 2005, 2007 and 2014, while the Mavericks won in 2011. In the 2007–08 season, all four teams that qualified for the playoffs each had more than 50 wins. In the 2010–11 season and the 2014–15 season, all teams in the division had winning percentages above 0.500 (50%). In the 2014–15 season, the Southwest Division saw every one of its teams making the playoffs, a feat achieved only twice in the last 30 years. The most recent division champions are the Houston Rockets.

Since the 2021–22 season, the Southwest Division champion has received the Willis Reed Trophy, named after Hall of Famer Willis Reed, who notably never played for or coached for a team currently in the division.

== 2026–27 standings ==
Southwest Division	W	L	PCT	GB	Home	Road	Div	GP
Houston Rockets	1	0	1.000	–	1‍–‍0	0‍–‍0	1–0	1
Memphis Grizzlies	1	0	1.000	–	1‍–‍0	0‍–‍0	0–0	1
San Antonio Spurs	0	1	.000	1.0	0‍–‍0	0‍–‍1	0–0	1
Dallas Mavericks	0	1	.000	1.0	0‍–‍0	0‍–‍1	0–1	1
New Orleans Pelicans	0	1	.000	1.0	0‍–‍1	0‍–‍0	0–0	1

== Teams ==
Team	City	Year	From
Team	City	Joined	
Dallas Mavericks	Dallas, Texas	2004	Midwest Division
Houston Rockets	Houston, Texas	2004	Midwest Division
Memphis Grizzlies (2001–present); Vancouver Grizzlies (1995–2001)	Memphis, Tennessee; Vancouver, British Columbia	2004	Midwest Division
New Orleans Pelicans (2013–present); New Orleans Hornets (2002–2005, 2007–2013); New Orleans/Oklahoma City Hornets (2005–2007)^{[a]}	New Orleans, Louisiana New Orleans, Louisiana and Oklahoma City, Oklahoma^{[a]}	2004	Central Division
San Antonio Spurs	San Antonio, Texas	2004	Midwest Division

== Willis Reed Trophy ==
Beginning with the 2021–22 season, the Southwest Division champion has received the Willis Reed Trophy. As with the other division championship trophies, it is named after one of the African American pioneers from NBA history. During his playing career from 1964 to 1974, Willis Reed became the first HBCU graduate to win both the NBA MVP Award and the Finals MVP Award. The Reed Trophy consists of a 200-millimetre (7.9 in) crystal ball.

== Division champions ==
^	Had or tied for the best regular season record for that season

Season	Team	Record	Playoffs result
2004–05	San Antonio Spurs	59–23 (.720)	Won NBA Finals
2005–06	San Antonio Spurs	63–19 (.768)	Lost conference semifinals
2006–07	Dallas Mavericks^	67–15 (.817)	Lost First round
2007–08	New Orleans Hornets	56–26 (.683)	Lost conference semifinals
2008–09	San Antonio Spurs	54–28 (.659)	Lost First round
2009–10	Dallas Mavericks	55–27 (.671)	Lost First round
2010–11	San Antonio Spurs	61–21 (.744)	Lost First round
2011–12^{[b]}	San Antonio Spurs^	50–16 (.758)	Lost conference finals
2012–13	San Antonio Spurs	58–24 (.707)	Lost NBA Finals
2013–14	San Antonio Spurs^	62–20 (.756)	Won NBA Finals
2014–15	Houston Rockets	56–26 (.683)	Lost conference finals
2015–16	San Antonio Spurs	67–15 (.817)	Lost conference semifinals
2016–17	San Antonio Spurs	61–21 (.744)	Lost conference finals
2017–18	Houston Rockets^	65–17 (.793)	Lost conference finals
2018–19	Houston Rockets	53–29 (.646)	Lost conference semifinals
2019–20^{[c]}	Houston Rockets	44–28 (.611)	Lost conference semifinals
2020–21^{[d]}	Dallas Mavericks	42–30 (.583)	Lost First round
2021–22	Memphis Grizzlies	56–26 (.683)	Lost conference semifinals
2022–23	Memphis Grizzlies	51–31 (.622)	Lost First round
2023–24	Dallas Mavericks	50–32 (.610)	Lost NBA Finals
2024–25	Houston Rockets	52–30 (.634)	Lost First round
2025–26	San Antonio Spurs	62–20 (.756)	Lost NBA Finals

=== Division Titles by team ===
Team	Titles	Season(s) won
San Antonio Spurs	10	2004–05, 2005–06, 2008–09, 2010–11, 2011–12, 2012–13, 2013–14, 2015–16, 2016–17, 2025–26
Houston Rockets	5	2014–15, 2017–18, 2018–19, 2019–20, 2024–25
Dallas Mavericks	4	2006–07, 2009–10, 2020–21, 2023–24
Memphis Grizzlies	2	2021–22, 2022–23
New Orleans Hornets/Pelicans	1	2007–08

== Season results ==
^	Denotes team that won the NBA Finals
^{+}	Denotes team that won the Conference finals, but lost the NBA Finals
*	Denotes team that qualified for the NBA Playoffs
×	Denotes team that qualified for the NBA play-in tournament

Season	Team (record)				
Season	1st	2nd	3rd	4th	5th
2004: The Southwest Division was formed with five inaugural members. The New Orleans Hornets joined from the Central Division, while the Dallas Mavericks, the Houston Rockets, the Memphis Grizzlies and the San Antonio Spurs joined from the Midwest Division.
2004–05	San Antonio^ (59–23)	Dallas* (58–24)	Houston* (51–31)	Memphis* (45–37)	New Orleans (18–64)
2005–06	San Antonio* (63–19)	Dallas^{+} (60–22)	Memphis* (49–33)	New Orleans/OKC^{[a]} (38–44)	Houston (34–48)
2006–07	Dallas* (67–15)	San Antonio^ (58–24)	Houston* (52–30)	New Orleans/OKC^{[a]} (39–43)	Memphis (22–60)
2007–08	New Orleans* (56–26)	San Antonio* (56–26)	Houston* (55–27)	Dallas* (51–31)	Memphis (22–60)
2008–09	San Antonio* (54–28)	Houston* (53–29)	Dallas* (50–32)	New Orleans* (49–33)	Memphis (24–58)
2009–10	Dallas* (55–27)	San Antonio* (50–32)	Houston (42–40)	Memphis (40–42)	New Orleans (37–45)
2010–11	San Antonio* (61–21)	Dallas^ (57–25)	New Orleans* (46–36)	Memphis* (46–36)	Houston (43–39)
2011–12^{[b]}	San Antonio* (50–16)	Memphis* (41–25)	Dallas* (36–30)	Houston (34–32)	New Orleans (21–45)
2012–13	San Antonio+ (58–24)	Memphis* (56–26)	Houston* (45–37)	Dallas (41–41)	New Orleans (27–55)
2013: The New Orleans Hornets were renamed the New Orleans Pelicans.
2013–14	San Antonio^ (62–20)	Houston* (54–28)	Memphis* (50–32)	Dallas* (49–33)	New Orleans (34–48)
2014–15	Houston* (56–26)	Memphis* (55–27)	San Antonio* (55–27)	Dallas* (50–32)	New Orleans* (45–37)
2015–16	San Antonio* (67–15)	Dallas* (42–40)	Memphis* (42–40)	Houston* (41–41)	New Orleans (30–52)
2016–17	San Antonio* (61–21)	Houston* (55–27)	Memphis* (43–39)	New Orleans (34–48)	Dallas (33–49)
2017–18	Houston* (65–17)	New Orleans* (48–34)	San Antonio* (47–35)	Dallas (24–58)	Memphis (22–60)
2018–19	Houston* (53–29)	San Antonio* (48–34)	Memphis (33–49)	New Orleans (33–49)	Dallas (33–49)
2019–20^{[c]}	Houston* (44–28)	Dallas* (43–32)	Memphis× (34–39)	San Antonio (32–39)	New Orleans (30–42)
2020–21^{[d]}	Dallas* (42–30)	Memphis* (38–34)	San Antonio× (33–39)	New Orleans (31–41)	Houston (17–55)
2021–22	Memphis* (56–26)	Dallas* (52–30)	New Orleans* (36–46)	San Antonio× (34–48)	Houston (20–62)
2022–23	Memphis* (51–31)	New Orleans× (42–40)	Dallas (38–44)	Houston (22–60)	San Antonio (22–60)
2023–24	Dallas^{+} (50–32)	New Orleans* (49–33)	Houston (41–41)	Memphis (27–55)	San Antonio (22–60)
2024–25	Houston* (52–30)	Memphis* (48–34)	Dallas× (39–43)	San Antonio (34–48)	New Orleans (21–61)
2025–26	San Antonio^{+} (62–20)	Houston* (52–30)	New Orleans (26–56)	Dallas (26–56)	Memphis (25–57)

== Notes ==
- ^{a 1} ^{2} ^{3} The New Orleans Hornets temporarily relocated to Oklahoma City due to the effect of Hurricane Katrina. The majority of home games were played in Oklahoma City, while a few remained in New Orleans.
- ^{b 1} ^{2} Because of a lockout, the season did not start until December 25, 2011, and all 30 teams played a shortened 66-game regular season schedule.
- ^{c 1} ^{2} Due to the COVID-19 pandemic, the 82-game regular season schedule was cancelled on March 11, 2020. The season was restarted on July 30 under an eight-game seeding format in the 2020 NBA Bubble to conclude the regular season and determine playoff berths. Games were played inside the ESPN Wide World of Sports Complex at Walt Disney World in Orlando, Florida.
- ^{d 1} ^{2} Season shortened to 72 games due to COVID-19 pandemic.

== See also ==
- Atlantic Division (NBA)
- Pacific Division (NBA)
- Midwest Division (NBA)
