= 2011–12 Minnesota Timberwolves season =

NBA professional basketball team season

- Head coach: Rick Adelman
- President: David Kahn
- General manager: David Kahn
- Owner: Glen Taylor
- Arena: Target Center

Results
- Record: 26–40 (.394)
- Place: Division: 5th (Northwest); Conference: 12th (Western)
- Playoff finish: Did not qualify
- Stats at Basketball Reference

Local media
- Television: Fox Sports North
- Radio: WCCO-AM 830

The 2011–12 Minnesota Timberwolves season was the 23rd season of the franchise in the National Basketball Association (NBA). In their first season with head coach Rick Adelman, the team finished the lockout-shortened season with a 26–40 record, nine wins above their previous season and finished in 12th place in the Western Conference. This season saw the debut of 2009 draftee Ricky Rubio, who was a contender for the Rookie of the Year Award until he tore his ACL and his lateral collateral ligament after colliding into Kobe Bryant during a game against the Los Angeles Lakers and was out for the rest of the season. Following the season, Brad Miller retired.

== Key dates ==
- June 23: The 2011 NBA draft took place at Prudential Center in Newark, New Jersey
- December 26: The Timberwolves begin the regular season with a loss against the Oklahoma City Thunder.

== Summary ==
=== NBA draft 2011 ===
Round	Pick	Player	Position	Nationality	College
1	2	Derrick Williams	Small forward / power forward	United States	Arizona
1	20	Donatas Motiejūnas (traded to Houston Rockets)	Power forward / center	Lithuania	Lithuania
1	23	Nikola Mirotić (from Houston Rockets traded to Chicago Bulls)	Power forward	Spain	Spain
1	28	Norris Cole (from Chicago Bulls traded to Miami Heat)	Point guard	United States	Cleveland State
2	31	Bojan Bogdanović (from Miami Heat traded to New Jersey Nets)	Small forward	Croatia	Croatia
2	38	Chandler Parsons (traded back to Houston Rockets for cash)	Power forward	United States	Florida
2	43	Malcolm Lee (from Chicago Bulls)	Shooting guard	United States	UCLA
2	57	Tanguy Ngombo (from Portland Trail Blazers)	Small forward	Qatar	Qatar

== Roster ==
2011–12 Minnesota Timberwolves roster
Players

Pos.	No.	Player	Height	Weight	DOB	From
G	11	José Juan Barea	6 ft 0 in (1.83 m)	175 lb (79 kg)	1984-06-26	Northeastern
F	8	Michael Beasley	6 ft 10 in (2.08 m)	235 lb (107 kg)	1989-01-09	Kansas State
G	22	Wayne Ellington	6 ft 4 in (1.93 m)	200 lb (91 kg)	1987-11-29	North Carolina
G/F	4	Wesley Johnson	6 ft 7 in (2.01 m)	215 lb (98 kg)	1987-07-11	Syracuse
G	3	Malcolm Lee	6 ft 5 in (1.96 m)	200 lb (91 kg)	1990-05-22	UCLA
F/C	42	Kevin Love	6 ft 10 in (2.08 m)	260 lb (118 kg)	1988–09–22	UCLA
C	31	Darko Miličić	7 ft 0 in (2.13 m)	275 lb (125 kg)	1985-06-20	Serbia
C	52	Brad Miller	7 ft 0 in (2.13 m)	261 lb (118 kg)	1976-04-12	Purdue
C	14	Nikola Peković	6 ft 11 in (2.11 m)	290 lb (132 kg)	1986-01-03	Montenegro
F	15	Anthony Randolph	6 ft 11 in (2.11 m)	225 lb (102 kg)	1989-07-15	LSU
G	13	Luke Ridnour	6 ft 2 in (1.88 m)	175 lb (79 kg)	1981-02-13	Oregon
G	9	Ricky Rubio	6 ft 4 in (1.93 m)	180 lb (82 kg)	1990-10-21	Spain
F	44	Anthony Tolliver	6 ft 9 in (2.06 m)	240 lb (109 kg)	1985-06-01	Creighton
G/F	5	Martell Webster	6 ft 7 in (2.01 m)	230 lb (104 kg)	1986-12-04	Seattle Prep (WA)
F	7	Derrick Williams	6 ft 8 in (2.03 m)	241 lb (109 kg)	1991–05–25	Arizona

Coaches
Head coach
- Rick Adelman
Assistant(s)
- Terry Porter
- Jack Sikma
- T. R. Dunn
- Bill Bayno

Legend
- (DP) Unsigned draft pick
- (FA) Free agent
- (S) Suspended
- Injured

== Pre-season ==
Due to the 2011 NBA lockout negotiations, the programmed pre-season schedule, along with the first two weeks of the regular season were scrapped, and a two-game pre-season was set for each team once the lockout concluded.

2011 pre-season game log
Pre-season: 2–0 (home: 1–0; road: 1–0)

Game	Date	Team	Score	High points	High rebounds	High assists	Location Attendance	Record
1	December 17	Milwaukee	W 117–96	Michael Beasley and Kevin Love(21)	Kevin Love (15)	Ricky Rubio (7)	Target Center 15,013	1–0
2	December 21	@ Milwaukee	W 85–84	Kevin Love (22)	Kevin Love (16)	Luke Ridnour (6)	Bradley Center	2–0

2011–12 season schedule

== Regular season ==
=== Standings ===
Northwest Division	W	L	PCT	GB	Home	Road	Div	GP
y-Oklahoma City Thunder	47	19	.712	–	26‍–‍7	21‍–‍12	10–3	66
x-Denver Nuggets	38	28	.576	9.0	20‍–‍13	18‍–‍15	6–7	66
x-Utah Jazz	36	30	.545	11.0	25‍–‍8	11‍–‍22	9–4	66
Portland Trail Blazers	28	38	.424	19.0	20‍–‍13	8‍–‍25	4–10	66
Minnesota Timberwolves	26	40	.394	21.0	13‍–‍20	13‍–‍20	4–9	66

Western Conference
#	Team	W	L	PCT	GB	GP
1	c-San Antonio Spurs *	50	16	.758	–	66
2	y-Oklahoma City Thunder *	47	19	.712	3.0	66
3	y-Los Angeles Lakers *	41	25	.621	9.0	66
4	x-Memphis Grizzlies	41	25	.621	9.0	66
5	x-Los Angeles Clippers	40	26	.606	10.0	66
6	x-Denver Nuggets	38	28	.576	12.0	66
7	x-Dallas Mavericks	36	30	.545	14.0	66
8	x-Utah Jazz	36	30	.545	14.0	66
9	Houston Rockets	34	32	.515	16.0	66
10	Phoenix Suns	33	33	.500	17.0	66
11	Portland Trail Blazers	28	38	.424	22.0	66
12	Minnesota Timberwolves	26	40	.394	24.0	66
13	Golden State Warriors	23	43	.348	27.0	66
14	Sacramento Kings	22	44	.333	28.0	66
15	New Orleans Hornets	21	45	.318	29.0	66

=== Game log ===
2011–12 game log
Total: 26–40 (Home: 13–20; Road: 13–20)
December: 0–3 (home: 0–2; road: 0–1)

Game	Date	Team	Score	High points	High rebounds	High assists	Location Attendance	Record
1	December 26	Oklahoma City	L 100–104	Michael Beasley (24)	Kevin Love (12)	Ricky Rubio (6)	Target Center; 19,406	0–1
2	December 27	@ Milwaukee	L 95–98	Kevin Love (31)	Kevin Love (20)	José Juan Barea; Ricky Rubio (4)	Bradley Center; 17,352	0–2
3	December 30	Miami	L 101–103	Kevin Love (25)	Kevin Love (12)	Ricky Rubio (12)	Target Center; 19,356	0–3

January: 10–8 (home: 5–5; road: 5–3)

Game	Date	Team	Score	High points	High rebounds	High assists	Location Attendance	Record
4	January 1	Dallas	W 99–82	Kevin Love (25)	Kevin Love (17)	Ricky Rubio (7)	Target Center; 15,115	1–3
5	January 2	San Antonio	W 106–96	Kevin Love (24)	Kevin Love (15)	Luke Ridnour (9)	Target Center; 14,514	2–3
6	January 4	Memphis	L 86–90	Kevin Love (27)	Kevin Love (14)	Ricky Rubio (10)	Target Center; 17,404	2–4
7	January 6	Cleveland	L 87–98	Kevin Love (29)	Kevin Love (14)	Luke Ridnour (6)	Target Center; 16,943	2–5
8	January 8	@ Washington	W 93–72	Kevin Love (20)	Kevin Love (16)	Ricky Rubio (14)	Verizon Center; 13,095	3–5
9	January 9	@ Toronto	L 87–97	Jose Barea (16)	Kevin Love (14)	Ricky Rubio (6)	Air Canada Centre; 14,097	3–6
10	January 10	Chicago	L 100–111	Luke Ridnour (22)	Kevin Love (13)	Ricky Rubio (12)	Target Center; 19,356	3–7
11	January 13	@ New Orleans	W 87–80	Kevin Love (34)	Kevin Love (15)	Ricky Rubio (9)	New Orleans Arena; 14,295	4–7
12	January 14	@ Atlanta	L 91–93	Kevin Love (30)	Kevin Love (13)	Ricky Rubio (12)	Philips Arena; 13,135	4–8
13	January 16	Sacramento	W 99–86	Kevin Love (33)	Kevin Love (11)	Luke Ridnour (9)	Target Center; 16,159	5–8
14	January 18	Detroit	W 93–85	Kevin Love (20)	Kevin Love (17)	Ricky Rubio (8)	Target Center; 15,598	6–8
15	January 20	@ L. A. Clippers	W 101–98	Darko Miličić (22)	Kevin Love (14)	Luke Ridnour; Ricky Rubio (6)	Staples Center; 19,492	7–8
16	January 21	@ Utah	L 98–108	Ricky Rubio (17)	Kevin Love; Derrick Williams (8)	Ricky Rubio (11)	EnergySolutions Arena; 19,911	7–9
17	January 23	Houston	L 92–107	Kevin Love (39)	Kevin Love (12)	Ricky Rubio (12)	Target Center; 16,924	7–10
18	January 25	@ Dallas	W 105–90	Kevin Love (31)	Kevin Love (11)	Ricky Rubio (12)	American Airlines Center; 20,150	8–10
19	January 27	San Antonio	W 87–79	Kevin Love; Ricky Rubio (18)	Kevin Love (16)	Ricky Rubio (10)	Target Center; 16,699	9–10
20	January 29	L. A. Lakers	L 101–106	Kevin Love (33)	Kevin Love (13)	Ricky Rubio (8)	Target Center; 17,551	9–11
21	January 30	@ Houston	W 120–108	Michael Beasley (34)	Ricky Rubio (8)	Ricky Rubio (11)	Staples Center; 14,264	10–11

February: 8–7 (home: 5–3; road: 3–4)

Game	Date	Team	Score	High points	High rebounds	High assists	Location Attendance	Record
22	February 1	Indiana	L 99–109	Kevin Love (21)	Kevin Love (17)	Ricky Rubio (6)	Target Center; 15,017	10–12
23	February 3	@ New Jersey	W 108–105	Nikola Peković (27)	Nikola Peković (11)	Ricky Rubio (10)	Prudential Center; 15,069	11–12
24	February 4	Houston	W 100–91	Kevin Love (25)	Kevin Love (18)	Ricky Rubio (11)	Target Center; 19,356	12–12
25	February 7	Sacramento	W 86–84	Nikola Peković (23)	Michael Beasley (14)	Ricky Rubio (14)	Target Center; 14,073	13–12
26	February 8	@ Memphis	L 80–85	José Juan Barea (17)	Nikola Peković; Derrick Williams (9)	José Juan Barea (6)	FedEx Forum; 13,287	13–13
27	February 10	Dallas	L 97–104	Kevin Love (32)	Kevin Love (12)	Ricky Rubio (8)	Target Center; 17,119	13–14
28	February 11	New York	L 98–100	Kevin Love (32)	Kevin Love (21)	Ricky Rubio (8)	Target Center; 20,232	13–15
29	February 13	@ Orlando	L 89–102	Kevin Love (19)	Kevin Love (15)	Ricky Rubio (8)	Amway Center; 18,846	13–16
30	February 15	Charlotte	W 102–90	Kevin Love (30)	Kevin Love (18)	José Juan Barea (8)	Target Center; 15,139	14–16
31	February 17	@ Houston	W 111–98	Kevin Love (33)	Kevin Love (17)	Ricky Rubio (9)	Toyota Center; 16,836	15–16
32	February 19	Philadelphia	W 92–91	Ricky Rubio (22)	Kevin Love (15)	Ricky Rubio (5)	Target Center; 18,759	16–16
33	February 20	@ Denver	L 101–103 (OT)	Kevin Love (22)	Kevin Love (13)	Luke Ridnour (6)	Pepsi Center; 17,263	16–17
34	February 22	Utah	W 100–98	José Juan Barea (22)	Nikola Peković (12)	Luke Ridnour; Ricky Rubio (6)	Target Center; 18,776	17–17
35	February 28	@ L. A. Clippers	W 109–97	Michael Beasley; Derrick Williams (27)	Kevin Love; Ricky Rubio (7)	Ricky Rubio (9)	Staples Center; 19,243	18–17
36	February 29	@ L. A. Lakers	L 85–104	Michael Beasley; Martell Webster (14)	Anthony Randolph (9)	Ricky Rubio (9)	Staples Center; 18,997	18–18

March: 7–10 (home: 3–3; road: 4–7)

Game	Date	Team	Score	High points	High rebounds	High assists	Location Attendance	Record
37	March 1	@ Phoenix	L 95–104	Kevin Love (23)	Kevin Love (10)	Luke Ridnour (8)	US Airways Center; 15,071	18–19
38	March 3	@ Portland	W 122–110	Kevin Love (42)	Kevin Love (10)	Ricky Rubio (12)	Rose Garden; 20,644	19–19
39	March 5	L. A. Clippers	W 95–94	Kevin Love (39)	Kevin Love (17)	Ricky Rubio (6)	Target Center; 19,509	20–19
40	March 7	Portland	W 106–94	Kevin Love (29)	Kevin Love (16)	José Juan Barea (7)	Target Center; 17,118	21–19
41	March 9	L. A. Lakers	L 102–105	Nikola Peković (25)	Nikola Peković (13)	Ricky Rubio (10)	Target Center; 20,164	21–20
42	March 10	New Orleans	L 89–95	Kevin Love (31)	Kevin Love (16)	Luke Ridnour (10)	Target Center; 20,123	21–21
43	March 12	@ Phoenix	W 127–124	Kevin Love (30)	Nikola Peković; Derrick Williams (8)	Luke Ridnour (9)	US Airways Center; 14,568	22–21
44	March 15	@ Utah	L 105–111	Gordon Hayward (26)	Kevin Love; Derrick Favors (16)	Luke Ridnour (13)	EnergySolutions Arena; 18,053	22–22
45	March 16	@ L. A. Lakers	L 92–97	Kevin Love (27)	Kevin Love (15)	Luke Ridnour (11)	Staples Center; 18,997	22–23
46	March 18	@ Sacramento	L 99–115	Kevin Love (21)	Kevin Love (11)	José Juan Barea (4)	Power Balance Pavilion; 15,616	22–24
47	March 19	@ Golden State	W 97–93	Kevin Love (36)	Kevin Love (16)	José Juan Barea; Luke Ridnour (10)	Oracle Arena; 19,596	23–24
48	March 21	@ San Antonio	L 100–116	José Juan Barea (18)	Kevin Love (12)	José Juan Barea (11)	AT&T Center; 18,581	23–25
49	March 23	@ Oklahoma City	L 140–149 (2OT)	Kevin Love (51)	Kevin Love (14)	José Juan Barea (14)	Chesapeake Energy Arena; 18,203	23–26
50	March 25	Denver	W 117–100	Kevin Love (30)	Kevin Love (21)	Luke Ridnour (6)	Target Center; 20,023	24–26
51	March 27	@ Memphis	L 86–93	Kevin Love (28)	Kevin Love (11)	Luke Ridnour (5)	FedEx Forum; 14,769	24–27
52	March 28	@ Charlotte	W 88–83	Kevin Love (40)	Kevin Love (19)	Luke Ridnour (14)	Time Warner Cable Arena; 10,540	25–27
53	March 30	Boston	L 79–100	Kevin Love (22)	Kevin Love (11)	Luke Ridnour (8)	Target Center; 19,356	25–28

April: 1–12 (home: 0–7; road: 1–5)

Game	Date	Team	Score	High points	High rebounds	High assists	Location Attendance	Record
54	April 1	@ Portland	L 106–119	Kevin Love (26)	Kevin Love (9)	Luke Ridnour (6)	Rose Garden; 20,359	25–29
55	April 2	@ Sacramento	L 108–116	Kevin Love (23)	Kevin Love (7)	Brad Miller; Luke Ridnour (6)	Power Balance Pavilion; 12,279	25–30
56	April 4	Golden State	L 94–97	Kevin Love (29)	Kevin Love (12)	José Juan Barea (8)	Target Center; 17,161	25–31
57	April 7	@ New Orleans	L 90–99	Kevin Love (29)	Kevin Love (12)	José Juan Barea (7)	New Orleans Arena; 15,520	25–32
58	April 9	Phoenix	L 90–114	Kevin Love (25)	Kevin Love (13)	José Juan Barea; Malcolm Lee (5)	Target Center; 17,274	25–33
59	April 11	@ Denver	L 107–113	Anthony Randolph (28)	Derrick Williams (8)	José Juan Barea (15)	Pepsi Center; 15,823	25–34
60	April 12	L. A. Clippers	L 82–95	Nikola Peković (17)	Michael Beasley (10)	José Juan Barea (11)	Target Center; 16,016	25–35
61	April 14	Oklahoma City	L 110–115	Michael Beasley (26)	Nikola Peković (13)	José Juan Barea (10)	Target Center; 19,552	25–36
62	April 16	@ Indiana	L 88–111	José Juan Barea (14)	Derrick Williams (10)	José Juan Barea (9)	Bankers Life Fieldhouse; 11,845	25–37
63	April 17	Memphis	L 84–91	José Juan Barea (28)	Nikola Peković (11)	José Juan Barea (8)	Target Center; 16,709	25–38
64	April 19	@ Detroit	W 91–80	Nikola Peković (23)	Anthony Randolph (10)	José Juan Barea (12)	The Palace of Auburn Hills; 12,458	26–38
65	April 22	Golden State	L 88–93	Nikola Peković (19)	Nikola Peković (16)	José Juan Barea (12)	Target Center; 15,872	26–39
66	April 26	Denver	L 102–131	José Juan Barea (20)	Nikola Peković (10)	José Juan Barea (5)	Target Center; 14,824	26–40

2011–12 season schedule

== Player statistics ==
=== Regular season ===
Player	POS	GP	GS	MP	REB	AST	STL	BLK	PTS	MPG	RPG	APG	SPG	BPG	PPG
Derrick Williams	PF	66	15	1,418	311	38	30	31	583	21.5	4.7	.6	.5	.5	8.8
Wesley Johnson	SF	65	64	1,469	177	59	35	48	393	22.6	2.7	.9	.5	.7	6.0
Kevin Love	PF	55	55	2,145	734	111	47	28	1,432	39.0	13.3	2.0	.9	.5	26.0
Luke Ridnour	SG	53	53	1,750	141	252	56	16	639	33.0	2.7	4.8	1.1	.3	12.1
Wayne Ellington	SG	51	4	973	99	33	26	10	311	19.1	1.9	.6	.5	.2	6.1
Anthony Tolliver	SF	51	0	882	153	22	18	19	208	17.3	3.0	.4	.4	.4	4.1
Nikola Peković	C	47	35	1,264	346	31	29	31	651	26.9	7.4	.7	.6	.7	13.9
Martell Webster	SF	47	26	1,140	168	40	31	17	324	24.3	3.6	.9	.7	.4	6.9
Michael Beasley	SF	47	7	1,087	207	45	18	19	541	23.1	4.4	1.0	.4	.4	11.5
Ricky Rubio	PG	41	31	1,404	171	336	91	8	436	34.2	4.2	8.2	2.2	.2	10.6
J. J. Barea	PG	41	11	1,032	114	232	21	0	463	25.2	2.8	5.7	.5	.0	11.3
Anthony Randolph	PF	34	5	517	123	19	13	35	252	15.2	3.6	.6	.4	1.0	7.4
Darko Miličić	C	29	23	472	97	17	9	25	134	16.3	3.3	.6	.3	.9	4.6
Malcolm Lee	SG	19	0	243	26	31	8	4	62	12.8	1.4	1.6	.4	.2	3.3
Brad Miller	C	15	1	146	19	24	4	2	35	9.7	1.3	1.6	.3	.1	2.3

== Awards and records ==
- Ricky Rubio was named Western Conference Rookie of the Month for December – January and earned an NBA All-Rookie First Team selection.
- Kevin Love earned an All-NBA Second Team selection.
- Kevin Love scored a franchise record 51 points in a double overtime loss against the Oklahoma City Thunder on March 23.

=== All-Star ===
- Kevin Love participated in his second All-Star game as a reserve for the West in the 2012 NBA All-Star Game and won the Three-Point Shootout.
- Ricky Rubio and Derrick Williams participated in the Rising Stars Challenge. Williams also participated in the Slam Dunk Contest.

== Injuries and disciplinary actions ==
- Brad Miller underwent surgery on his left knee during the offseason and returned on January 29.
- On December, Malcolm Lee underwent surgery to repair a torn meniscus and was out for two months.
- Martell Webster had surgery on his back in December and returned to practice with the team in mid-January.
- Kevin Love earned a two-game suspension after stepping over Luis Scola during a game against the Houston Rockets on February 4.
- Ricky Rubio tore his ACL during a game against the Los Angeles Lakers on March 9 and missed the remainder of the season.

== Transactions ==
=== Overview ===
Players Added

Via draft

- Malcolm Lee
- Derrick Williams

Via free agency

- José Juan Barea

Via trade

- Brad Miller
- Robert Vaden (later waived)
Players Lost

Via trade

- Jonny Flynn
- Lazar Hayward

Via free agency

- Sebastian Telfair

=== Trades ===
June 23, 2011	To Minnesota Timberwolves Brad Miller; Draft rights to Nikola Mirotić; Draft rights to Chandler Parsons; Future first-round pick	To Houston Rockets Jonny Flynn; Draft rights to Donatas Motiejūnas; 2012 second-round pick
June 23, 2011	To Minnesota Timberwolves Draft rights to Norris Cole; Draft rights to Malcolm Lee; Cash considerations	To Chicago Bulls Draft rights to Nikola Mirotić
June 23, 2011	To Minnesota Timberwolves Draft rights to Bojan Bogdanović; 2014 second-round pick Cash considerations	To Miami Heat Draft rights to Norris Cole
June 23, 2011	To Minnesota Timberwolves 2013 second-round pick Cash considerations	To New Jersey Nets Draft rights to Bojan Bogdanović
June 23, 2011	To Minnesota Timberwolves Cash considerations	To Houston Rockets Draft rights to Chandler Parsons
June 27, 2011	To Minnesota Timberwolves Draft rights to Tanguy Ngombo	To Portland Trail Blazers Future second-round pick
December 13, 2011	To Minnesota Timberwolves Robert Vaden; 2012 second-round pick Future second-round pick	To Oklahoma City Thunder Lazar Hayward

=== Free agents ===
Additions
Player	Date signed	Former team
José Juan Barea	December 14	Dallas Mavericks

Subtractions
Player	Date signed	New team
Sebastian Telfair	December 9	Phoenix Suns

Many players signed with teams from other leagues due to the 2011 NBA lockout. FIBA allows players under NBA contracts to sign and play for teams from other leagues if the contracts have opt-out clauses that allow the players to return to the NBA if the lockout ends. The Chinese Basketball Association, however, only allows its clubs to sign foreign free agents who could play for at least the entire season.

Played in other leagues during lockout
Player	Date signed	New team	Opt-out clause
Nikola Peković	August 16	KK Partizan (Serbia)	Yes

== See also ==
2011–12 NBA season
