= 2011–12 San Antonio Spurs season =

- Division champions
- Head coach: Gregg Popovich
- President: Gregg Popovich
- General manager: R. C. Buford
- Owner: Peter Holt
- Arena: AT&T Center

Results
- Record: 50–16 (.758)
- Place: Division: 1st (Southwest); Conference: 1st (Western)
- Playoff finish: Western Conference finals (lost to Thunder 2–4)
- Stats at Basketball Reference

Local media
- Television: FS Southwest; KENS; KMYS
- Radio: WOAI; KCOR (in Spanish)

The 2011–12 San Antonio Spurs season was the 45th season of the franchise, 39th in San Antonio and 36th in the National Basketball Association (NBA). The Spurs tied the Chicago Bulls for the best record of the season at 50–16, transmuted to 62–20 in an 82-game season, as the season was shortened to 66 games due to the 2011 NBA lockout.

The Spurs attained the first seed in the Western Conference, earning a berth in the 2012 NBA playoffs, where they swept both the Utah Jazz and the Los Angeles Clippers in four games in the first round and semifinals, respectively, only to be eliminated in six games by the Oklahoma City Thunder in the Western Conference finals. The Thunder would go on to lose to the Miami Heat in the Finals in five games.

== Key dates ==
- June 23: The 2011 NBA draft took place at Prudential Center in Newark, New Jersey.
- April 27: Upon defeating Golden State in the season finale, the Spurs achieved their 13th consecutive 50-plus-win season, a new NBA record.
- May 1: Gregg Popovich announced as the recipient of the 2011–12 NBA Coach of the Year Award.
- May 7: With an 87–81 win the Spurs defeated the Utah Jazz in a 4–0 series sweep in the first round of the 2012 NBA playoffs.
- May 20: Spurs completed another series sweep, defeating the L.A. Clippers with a 102–99 win in the second round of the 2012 NBA playoffs.
- May 29: With the Spurs' game 2 victory over the Thunder, their 20th consecutive, the Spurs became only the fourth team in NBA history to win 20 or more straight victories.
- June 6: The Spurs are defeated by the Oklahoma City Thunder in the Western Conference finals in a six-game series.

== Draft picks ==
Round	Pick	Player	Position	Nationality	School/club team
1	15	Kawhi Leonard	Small forward	United States	San Diego State
1	29	Cory Joseph	Point guard	Canada	University of Texas
2	42	Dāvis Bertāns	Small forward	Latvia	Union Olimpija (Slovenia)
2	59	Ádám Hanga	Shooting guard	Hungary	Assignia Manresa (Spain)

== Roster ==
2011–12 San Antonio Spurs roster
Players

Pos.	No.	Player	Height	Weight	DOB	From
SG	25	James Anderson	6 ft 6 in (1.98 m)	215 lb (98 kg)	1989-03-25	Oklahoma State
PF	45	DeJuan Blair	6 ft 7 in (2.01 m)	270 lb (122 kg)	1989-04-22	Pittsburgh
PF	15	Matt Bonner	6 ft 10 in (2.08 m)	235 lb (107 kg)	1980-04-05	Florida
PF	34	Derrick Byars	6 ft 7 in (2.01 m)	220 lb (100 kg)	1984-04-25	Vanderbilt
PF	33	Boris Diaw	6 ft 8 in (2.03 m)	235 lb (107 kg)	1982-04-16	France
C	21	Tim Duncan	6 ft 11 in (2.11 m)	255 lb (116 kg)	1976-04-25	Wake Forest
SG	20	Manu Ginóbili	6 ft 6 in (1.98 m)	205 lb (93 kg)	1977-07-28	Argentina
SG	4	Danny Green	6 ft 6 in (1.98 m)	210 lb (95 kg)	1987-06-22	North Carolina
SF	3	Stephen Jackson	6 ft 8 in (2.03 m)	220 lb (100 kg)	1978-04-05	Oak Hill Academy (HS)
PG	5	Cory Joseph	6 ft 3 in (1.91 m)	185 lb (84 kg)	1991-08-20	Texas
SF	2	Kawhi Leonard	6 ft 7 in (2.01 m)	225 lb (102 kg)	1991-06-29	San Diego State
PG	8	Patty Mills	6 ft 0 in (1.83 m)	185 lb (84 kg)	1988-08-11	Saint Mary's
SG	14	Gary Neal	6 ft 4 in (1.93 m)	210 lb (95 kg)	1984-10-03	Towson
PG	9	Tony Parker	6 ft 2 in (1.88 m)	185 lb (84 kg)	1982-05-17	France
C	22	Tiago Splitter	6 ft 11 in (2.11 m)	240 lb (109 kg)	1985-01-01	Brazil

Coaches
Head coach
- Gregg Popovich
Assistant(s)
- Brett Brown
- Mike Budenholzer
- Chip Engelland
- Chad Forcier
- Don Newman
- Jacque Vaughn

Legend
- (DP) Unsigned draft pick
- (FA) Free agent
- (S) Suspended
- Injured

Roster
Updated: April 25, 2012

== Pre-season ==
Due to the 2011 NBA lockout negotiations, the programmed pre-season schedule, along with the first two weeks of the regular season were scrapped, and a two-game pre-season was set for each team once the lockout concluded.

2011 pre-season game log
Pre-season: 1–1 (home: 1–0; road: 0–1)

Game	Date	Team	Score	High points	High rebounds	High assists	Location Attendance	Record
1	December 17	@ Houston	L 87–101	DeJuan Blair; Manu Ginóbili (16)	DeJuan Blair (7)	T. J. Ford (6)	Toyota Center; 12,859	0–1
2	December 21	Houston	W 97–95	Tim Duncan (19)	Gani Lawal; T. J. Ford (5)	Tony Parker; Tim Duncan (5)	AT&T Center; 17,323	1–1

2011–12 season schedule

== Regular season ==
=== Standings ===
Southwest Division	W	L	PCT	GB	Home	Road	Div	GP
c-San Antonio Spurs	50	16	.758	–	28‍–‍5	22‍–‍11	12–4	66
x-Memphis Grizzlies	41	25	.621	9.0	26‍–‍7	15‍–‍18	7–8	66
x-Dallas Mavericks	36	30	.545	14.0	23‍–‍10	13‍–‍20	8–5	66
Houston Rockets	34	32	.515	16.0	22‍–‍11	12‍–‍21	6–8	66
New Orleans Hornets	21	45	.318	29.0	11‍–‍22	10‍–‍23	3–11	66

Western Conference
#	Team	W	L	PCT	GB	GP
1	c-San Antonio Spurs *	50	16	.758	–	66
2	y-Oklahoma City Thunder *	47	19	.712	3.0	66
3	y-Los Angeles Lakers *	41	25	.621	9.0	66
4	x-Memphis Grizzlies	41	25	.621	9.0	66
5	x-Los Angeles Clippers	40	26	.606	10.0	66
6	x-Denver Nuggets	38	28	.576	12.0	66
7	x-Dallas Mavericks	36	30	.545	14.0	66
8	x-Utah Jazz	36	30	.545	14.0	66
9	Houston Rockets	34	32	.515	16.0	66
10	Phoenix Suns	33	33	.500	17.0	66
11	Portland Trail Blazers	28	38	.424	22.0	66
12	Minnesota Timberwolves	26	40	.394	24.0	66
13	Golden State Warriors	23	43	.348	27.0	66
14	Sacramento Kings	22	44	.333	28.0	66
15	New Orleans Hornets	21	45	.318	29.0	66

=== Game log ===
2011–12 game log
Total: 50–16 (home: 28–5; road: 22–11)
December: 3–1 (home: 3–0; road: 0–1)

Game	Date	Team	Score	High points	High rebounds	High assists	Location Attendance	Record
1	December 26	Memphis	W 95–82	Manu Ginóbili (24)	Tiago Splitter (8)	Tony Parker (7)	AT&T Center; 18,581	1–0
2	December 28	L. A. Clippers	W 115–90	Manu Ginóbili (24)	Tim Duncan, Kawhi Leonard (8)	Tony Parker (9)	AT&T Center; 18,581	2–0
3	December 29	@ Houston	L 85–105	DeJuan Blair (22)	DeJuan Blair (8)	Tiago Splitter (3)	Toyota Center; 18,267	2–1
4	December 31	Utah	W 104–89	Manu Ginóbili (23)	DeJuan Blair (10)	Tony Parker (8)	AT&T Center; 17,769	3–1

January : 10–8 (home: 7–1; road: 3–7)

Game	Date	Team	Score	High points	High rebounds	High assists	Location Attendance	Record
5	January 2	@ Minnesota	L 96–106	Richard Jefferson, Tim Duncan (16)	Matt Bonner (6)	Tony Parker (9)	Target Center; 14,514	3–2
6	January 4	Golden State	W 101–96	Tony Parker (21)	Tim Duncan (11)	Tony Parker, T. J. Ford (8)	AT&T Center; 16,751	4–2
7	January 5	Dallas	W 93–71	Matt Bonner (17)	Richard Jefferson (7)	Tony Parker (8)	AT&T Center; 18,581	5–2
8	January 7	Denver	W 121–117	Danny Green (24)	DeJuan Blair (10)	T. J. Ford (7)	AT&T Center; 17,537	6–2
9	January 8	@ Oklahoma City	L 96–108	Gary Neal (18)	Kawhi Leonard (10)	Tony Parker (7)	Chesapeake Energy Arena; 18,203	6–3
10	January 10	@ Milwaukee	L 93–96	Tony Parker (22)	Tim Duncan (8)	Tony Parker (8)	Bradley Center; 11,585	6–4
11	January 11	Houston	W 101–95 (OT)	Tony Parker (28)	Tim Duncan (11)	Tony Parker (8)	AT&T Center; 17,381	7–4
12	January 13	Portland	W 99–83	Tony Parker (20)	DeJuan Blair (11)	Tony Parker (9)	AT&T Center; 18,581	8–4
13	January 15	Phoenix	W 102–91	Tim Duncan (21)	Tim Duncan (11)	Tony Parker (9)	AT&T Center; 18,581	9–4
14	January 17	@ Miami	L 98–120	Danny Green (20)	Tim Duncan (7)	Richard Jefferson (5)	American Airlines Arena; 19,600	9–5
15	January 18	@ Orlando	W 85–83 (OT)	Tony Parker (25)	Tim Duncan (10)	Tony Parker (9)	Amway Center; 18,846	10–5
16	January 20	Sacramento	L 86–88	Tony Parker (24)	Tim Duncan (10)	Tony Parker (6)	AT&T Center; 18,581	10–6
17	January 21	@ Houston	L 102–105	Tiago Splitter (25)	Kawhi Leonard (11)	Tony Parker (13)	Toyota Center; 15,285	10–7
18	January 23	@ New Orleans	W 104–102	Tim Duncan (28)	Tim Duncan (7)	Tony Parker (17)	New Orleans Arena; 12,599	11–7
19	January 25	Atlanta	W 105–83	Matt Bonner, DeJuan Blair (17)	Tim Duncan (11)	Tony Parker (7)	AT&T Center; 17,888	12–7
20	January 27	@ Minnesota	L 79–87	Tony Parker (20)	Tim Duncan (10)	Tim Duncan (4)	Target Center; 16,699	12–8
21	January 29	@ Dallas	L 100–101 (OT)	Gary Neal (19)	DeJuan Blair (9)	Gary Neal (7)	American Airlines Center; 20,262	12–9
22	January 30	@ Memphis	W 83–73	Matt Bonner (15)	Kawhi Leonard (10)	Tony Parker (12)	FedExForum; 15,118	13–9

February : 11–2 (home: 3–1; road: 8–1)

Game	Date	Team	Score	High points	High rebounds	High assists	Location Attendance	Record
23	February 1	Houston	W 99–91	Tim Duncan (25)	Matt Bonner (10)	Tony Parker, Danny Green (4)	AT&T Center; 18,581	14–9
24	February 2	New Orleans	W 93–81	Tim Duncan (19)	Tim Duncan (9)	Tony Parker (7)	AT&T Center; 18,082	15–9
25	February 4	Oklahoma City	W 107–96	Tony Parker (42)	Tim Duncan (15)	Tony Parker (9)	AT&T Center; 18,581	16–9
26	February 6	@ Memphis	W 89–84	Tony Parker (21)	Tim Duncan (17)	Tony Parker (7)	FedExForum; 13,527	17–9
27	February 8	@ Philadelphia	W 100–90	Tony Parker (37)	Tim Duncan (11)	Tony Parker (8)	Wells Fargo Center; 18,070	18–9
28	February 11	@ New Jersey	W 103–89	Gary Neal (18)	Tim Duncan (10)	Tim Duncan, Tony Parker (5)	Prudential Center; 15,272	19–9
29	February 14	@ Detroit	W 99–95	Tim Duncan (18)	Tim Duncan (13)	Tony Parker, Manu Ginóbili (7)	The Palace of Auburn Hills; 11,533	20–9
30	February 15	@ Toronto	W 113–106	Tony Parker (34)	Danny Green (7)	Tony Parker (14)	Air Canada Centre; 15,999	21–9
31	February 18	@ L. A. Clippers	W 103–100 (OT)	Tony Parker (30)	Tim Duncan (17)	Tony Parker (10)	Staples Center; 19,217	22–9
32	February 20	@ Utah	W 106–102	Tony Parker (23)	Kawhi Leonard (8)	Tony Parker (11)	EnergySolutions Arena; 19,105	23–9
33	February 21	@ Portland	L 97–137	Kawhi Leonard (24)	Kawhi Leonard (10)	Richard Jefferson, Cory Joseph, Gary Neal (3)	Rose Garden; 20,567	23–10
34	February 23	@ Denver	W 114–99	Dejuan Blair (28)	DeJuan Blair (12)	Tony Parker (12)	Pepsi Center; 18,875	24–10
All-Star Break
35	February 29	Chicago	L 89–96	Gary Neal (21)	Tim Duncan (10)	Tony Parker (9)	AT&T Center; 18,581	24–11

March : 11–3 (home: 8–2; road: 3–1)

Game	Date	Team	Score	High points	High rebounds	High assists	Location Attendance	Record
36	March 2	Charlotte	W 102–72	Tony Parker (15)	DeJuan Blair (11)	Tony Parker (4)	AT&T Center; 18,581	25–11
37	March 4	Denver	L 94–99	Tony Parker (25)	Tim Duncan (9)	Tony Parker (7)	AT&T Center; 18,581	25–12
38	March 7	New York	W 118–105	Tony Parker (32)	Tim Duncan (8)	Tony Parker, Manu Ginóbili (6)	AT&T Center; 18,581	26–12
39	March 9	L. A. Clippers	L 108–120	Manu Ginóbili (22)	Matt Bonner, Kawhi Leonard (6)	Manu Ginóbili (6)	AT&T Center; 18,581	26–13
40	March 12	Washington	W 112–97	Tony Parker (31)	DeJuan Blair (12)	Tony Parker, Manu Ginóbili (7)	AT&T Center; 18,581	27–13
41	March 14	Orlando	W 122–111	Tony Parker (31)	Tim Duncan (13)	Tony Parker (12)	AT&T Center; 18,581	28–13
42	March 16	@ Oklahoma City	W 114–105	Tony Parker (25)	Tim Duncan (19)	Tony Parker (7)	Chesapeake Energy Arena; 18,203	29–13
43	March 17	@ Dallas	L 99–106	Danny Green, Tim Duncan (17)	Tiago Splitter (6)	Tony Parker (11)	American Airlines Center; 20,528	29–14
44	March 21	Minnesota	W 116–100	Tim Duncan (21)	Tim Duncan (15)	Manu Ginóbili (8)	AT&T Center; 18,581	30–14
45	March 23	Dallas	W 104–87	Danny Green (18)	Tim Duncan (12)	Manu Ginóbili (7)	AT&T Center; 18,581	31–14
46	March 24	@ New Orleans	W 89–86	DeJuan Blair (23)	Tim Duncan, DeJuan Blair, Kawhi Leonard, Danny Green (7)	Tony Parker (10)	New Orleans Arena; 16,118	32–14
47	March 25	Philadelphia	W 93–76	Tony Parker (21)	Kawhi Leonard (10)	Tony Parker (7)	AT&T Center; 18,581	33–14
48	March 27	@ Phoenix	W 107–100	Tim Duncan (26)	Tim Duncan (11)	Tony Parker (7)	US Airways Center; 16,573	34–14
49	March 28	@ Sacramento	W 117–112	Manu Ginóbili (20)	Kawhi Leonard (9)	Tony Parker (10)	Power Balance Pavilion; 13,119	35–14
50	March 31	Indiana	W 112–103	Tim Duncan (23)	Tim Duncan (11)	Tony Parker, Manu Ginóbili (5)	AT&T Center; 18,581	36–14

April: 12–2 (home: 6–1; road: 6–1)

Game	Date	Team	Score	High points	High rebounds	High assists	Location Attendance	Record
51	April 3	@ Cleveland	W 125–90	Patrick Mills (20)	Tim Duncan (8)	Boris Diaw (8)	Quicken Loans Arena; 19,574	37–14
52	April 4	@ Boston	W 87–86	Danny Green (14)	Tim Duncan (16)	Gary Neal (4)	TD Garden; 18,624	38–14
53	April 6	New Orleans	W 128–103	Tim Duncan (19)	Stephen Jackson (7)	Tony Parker (6)	AT&T Center; 18,581	39–14
54	April 8	Utah	W 114–100	Tony Parker (28)	Tim Duncan (13)	Danny Green (5)	AT&T Center; 18,581	40–14
55	April 9	@ Utah	L 84–91	Gary Neal (14)	DeJuan Blair (8)	Gary Neal (5)	EnergySolutions Arena; 19,911	40–15
56	April 11	L. A. Lakers	L 84–98	Danny Green (22)	Kawhi Leonard, Stephen Jackson (5)	Tony Parker (8)	AT&T Center; 18,581	40–16
57	April 12	Memphis	W 107–97	Tim Duncan (28)	Tim Duncan (12)	Tony Parker (9)	AT&T Center; 18,581	41–16
58	April 14	Phoenix	W 105–91	Tim Duncan (19)	Tim Duncan (11)	Tony Parker (5)	AT&T Center; 18,581	42–16
59	April 16	@ Golden State	W 120–99	Gary Neal (17)	Boris Diaw (9)	Gary Neal, Tony Parker (5)	Oracle Arena; 18,471	43–16
60	April 17	@ L. A. Lakers	W 112–91	Tony Parker (29)	Tim Duncan, Matt Bonner (8)	Tony Parker (13)	Staples Center; 18,997	44–16
61	April 18	@ Sacramento	W 127–102	Gary Neal, Tiago Splitter (17)	Tiago Splitter (7)	Tony Parker (8)	Power Balance Pavilion; 16,954	45–16
62	April 20	L. A. Lakers	W 121–97	Tim Duncan (21)	Tim Duncan (8)	Tony Parker (10)	AT&T Center; 18,581	46–16
63	April 22	Cleveland	W 114–98	Manu Ginóbili (20)	Tiago Splitter, Boris Diaw, Kawhi Leonard, DeJuan Blair (7)	Tony Parker (9)	AT&T Center; 18,581	47–16
64	April 23	Portland	W 124–89	Danny Green, Tim Duncan (18)	Tim Duncan (8)	Boris Diaw, Tony Parker (6)	AT&T Center; 18,581	48–16
65	April 25	@ Phoenix	W 110–106	Patrick Mills (27)	DeJuan Blair (8)	Stephen Jackson (6)	US Airways Center; 17,172	49–16
66	April 26	@ Golden State	W 107–101	Patrick Mills (34)	DeJuan Blair (13)	Patrick Mills (12)	Oracle Arena; 18,124	50–16

2011–12 season schedule

== Playoffs ==
=== Game log ===
2012 playoff game log
First round: 4–0 (home: 2–0; road: 2–0)

Game	Date	Team	Score	High points	High rebounds	High assists	Location Attendance	Series
1	April 29	Utah	W 106–91	Tony Parker (28)	Tim Duncan (11)	Tony Parker (8)	AT&T Center; 18,581	1–0
2	May 2	Utah	W 114–83	Tony Parker (18)	Tim Duncan (13)	Tony Parker (9)	AT&T Center; 18,581	2–0
3	May 5	@ Utah	W 102–90	Tony Parker (27)	Tiago Splitter (8)	Manu Ginóbili (10)	EnergySolutions Arena; 19,911	3–0
4	May 7	@ Utah	W 87–81	Manu Ginóbili (17)	Stephen Jackson (6)	Tony Parker (3)	EnergySolutions Arena; 19,911	4–0

Conference semifinals: 4–0 (home: 2–0; road: 2–0)

Game	Date	Team	Score	High points	High rebounds	High assists	Location Attendance	Series
1	May 15	L. A. Clippers	W 108–92	Tim Duncan (26)	Boris Diaw (12)	Tony Parker (11)	AT&T Center; 18,581	1–0
2	May 17	L. A. Clippers	W 105–88	Tony Parker (22)	Kawhi Leonard (6)	Tony Parker (5); Manu Ginóbili (5)	AT&T Center; 18,581	2–0
3	May 19	@ L. A. Clippers	W 96–86	Tony Parker (23)	Tim Duncan (13)	Tony Parker (10)	Staples Center; 19,060	3–0
4	May 20	@ L. A. Clippers	W 102–99	Tim Duncan (21)	Tim Duncan (9)	Tony Parker (5)	Staples Center; 19,060	4–0

Conference finals: 2–4 (home: 2–1; road: 0–3)

Game	Date	Team	Score	High points	High rebounds	High assists	Location Attendance	Series
1	May 27	Oklahoma City	W 101–98	Manu Ginóbili (26)	Tim Duncan (11)	Tony Parker (6)	AT&T Center; 18,581	1–0
2	May 29	Oklahoma City	W 120–111	Tony Parker (34)	Tim Duncan (12)	Tony Parker (6)	AT&T Center; 18,581	2–0
3	May 31	@ Oklahoma City	L 82–102	Tony Parker (16); S. Jackson (16)	Manu Ginóbili (6); Kawhi Leonard (6)	Gary Neal (5)	Chesapeake Energy Arena 18,203	2–1
4	June 2	@ Oklahoma City	L 103–109	Tim Duncan (21)	Kawhi Leonard (9)	Gary Neal (4); Manu Ginóbili (4)	Chesapeake Energy Arena 18,203	2–2
5	June 4	Oklahoma City	L 103–108	Manu Ginóbili (34)	Tim Duncan (12)	Manu Ginóbili (7)	AT&T Center; 18,581	2–3
6	June 6	@ Oklahoma City	L 99–107	Tony Parker (29)	Tim Duncan (14)	Tony Parker (12)	Chesapeake Energy Arena 18,203	2–4

2012 playoff schedule

== Player statistics ==
=== Regular season ===
Player	POS	GP	GS	MP	REB	AST	STL	BLK	PTS	MPG	RPG	APG	SPG	BPG	PPG
Danny Green	SG	66	38	1,522	228	86	58	46	603	23.1	3.5	1.3	.9	.7	9.1
Matt Bonner	PF	65	2	1,326	214	61	15	21	429	20.4	3.3	.9	.2	.3	6.6
DeJuan Blair	PF	64	62	1,363	351	78	59	12	611	21.3	5.5	1.2	.9	.2	9.5
Kawhi Leonard	SF	64	39	1,534	327	70	85	24	507	24.0	5.1	1.1	1.3	.4	7.9
Tony Parker	PG	60	60	1,923	171	463	57	5	1,095	32.1	2.9	7.7	1.0	.1	18.3
Tiago Splitter	C	59	2	1,121	306	65	21	47	549	19.0	5.2	1.1	.4	.8	9.3
Tim Duncan	C	58	58	1,634	520	132	38	88	895	28.2	9.0	2.3	.7	1.5	15.4
Gary Neal	SG	56	7	1,206	118	117	27	2	557	21.5	2.1	2.1	.5	.0	9.9
James Anderson	SG	51	2	603	79	41	8	2	190	11.8	1.5	.8	.2	.0	3.7
Richard Jefferson^{†}	SF	41	41	1,168	143	55	25	12	379	28.5	3.5	1.3	.6	.3	9.2
Manu Ginóbili	SG	34	7	792	116	151	24	12	440	23.3	3.4	4.4	.7	.4	12.9
Cory Joseph	PG	29	1	266	25	34	7	3	58	9.2	.9	1.2	.2	.1	2.0
Stephen Jackson^{†}	SF	21	1	500	81	41	28	7	187	23.8	3.9	2.0	1.3	.3	8.9
Boris Diaw^{†}	PF	20	7	406	85	47	14	6	93	20.3	4.3	2.4	.7	.3	4.7
Patty Mills	PG	16	3	261	28	39	10	1	165	16.3	1.8	2.4	.6	.1	10.3
T. J. Ford	PG	14	0	191	18	45	9	2	51	13.6	1.3	3.2	.6	.1	3.6
Eric Dawson	C	4	0	39	10	0	1	2	15	9.8	2.5	.0	.3	.5	3.8
Malcolm Thomas	PF	3	0	15	3	1	1	1	1	5.0	1.0	.3	.3	.3	.3
Derrick Byars	PF	2	0	37	11	1	2	0	10	18.5	5.5	.5	1.0	.0	5.0
Justin Dentmon^{†}	PG	2	0	19	1	1	1	0	4	9.5	.5	.5	.5	.0	2.0
Ike Diogu	PF	2	0	14	1	0	0	0	2	7.0	.5	.0	.0	.0	1.0

- ^{†} Denotes player spent time with another team in the season. Stats reflect time with the Spurs only.

=== Playoffs ===
Player	POS	GP	GS	MP	REB	AST	STL	BLK	PTS	MPG	RPG	APG	SPG	BPG	PPG
Tony Parker	PG	14	14	506	50	95	13	0	282	36.1	3.6	6.8	.9	.0	20.1
Tim Duncan	C	14	14	463	131	39	10	29	243	33.1	9.4	2.8	.7	2.1	17.4
Kawhi Leonard	SF	14	14	379	83	8	17	6	121	27.1	5.9	.6	1.2	.4	8.6
Boris Diaw	PF	14	14	346	73	35	11	4	87	24.7	5.2	2.5	.8	.3	6.2
Danny Green	SG	14	12	289	45	15	7	10	103	20.6	3.2	1.1	.5	.7	7.4
Manu Ginóbili	SG	14	2	390	49	56	10	4	201	27.9	3.5	4.0	.7	.3	14.4
Stephen Jackson	SF	14	0	299	28	24	9	3	116	21.4	2.0	1.7	.6	.2	8.3
Gary Neal	SG	14	0	217	18	19	2	0	105	15.5	1.3	1.4	.1	.0	7.5
Tiago Splitter	C	13	0	168	36	10	5	4	76	12.9	2.8	.8	.4	.3	5.8
Matt Bonner	PF	13	0	165	25	9	2	4	31	12.7	1.9	.7	.2	.3	2.4
DeJuan Blair	PF	10	0	76	23	2	3	1	37	7.6	2.3	.2	.3	.1	3.7
Patty Mills	PG	8	0	31	3	5	1	0	15	3.9	.4	.6	.1	.0	1.9
James Anderson	SG	8	0	31	5	3	1	0	11	3.9	.6	.4	.1	.0	1.4

== Transactions ==
=== Trades ===
March 15, 2012

June 23, 2011

To San Antonio Spurs

- (United States) Stephen Jackson
To San Antonio Spurs

- (United States) Draft rights to 15th pick Kawhi Leonard
- Draft rights to 42nd pick Dāvis Bertāns
- (Slovenia) Draft rights to Erazem Lorbek
To Golden State Warriors

- (United States) Richard Jefferson
- (United States) T. J. Ford
- Conditional 2012 first-round pick
To Indiana Pacers

- (United States) George Hill

=== Free agents ===
==== Additions ====
Player	Signed	Former Team
Eric Dawson	Signed 10-day contract	Austin Toros
T. J. Ford	Undisclosed	Indiana Pacers
Gani Lawal	Undisclosed	Phoenix Suns
Ike Diogu	Undisclosed	Los Angeles Clippers
Malcolm Thomas	Undisclosed	Los Angeles D-Fenders
Boris Diaw	Undisclosed	Charlotte Bobcats
Patrick Mills	Undisclosed	Portland Trail Blazers
Justin Dentmon	Signed 10-day contract	Austin Toros

==== Subtractions ====
Player	Reason Left	New Team
Da'Sean Butler	Waived	Austin Toros
T. J. Ford	Retired	N/A
Steve Novak	Waived	New York Knicks
Antonio McDyess	Waived	N/A
Gani Lawal	Waived	Chorale Roanne
Ike Diogu	Waived	Capitanes de Arecibo
Malcolm Thomas	Waived	Los Angeles D-Fenders

== Award winners ==
- Tony Parker, NBA All-Star Western Conference reserve (4th appearance)
- Tony Parker, Guard, All-NBA Second Team
- Kawhi Leonard, Forward, All-Rookie First Team
- Gregg Popovich, Western Conference Coach of the Month (February)
- Gregg Popovich, Western Conference Coach of the Month (March)
- Gregg Popovich, NBA Coach of the Year
