= 2011–12 Sacramento Kings season =

NBA professional basketball team season

- Head coach: Paul Westphal (Dec 26-Jan 5); Keith Smart (Jan 5-Apr 26)
- General manager: Geoff Petrie
- Owners: Maloof family
- Arena: Power Balance Pavilion

Results
- Record: 22–44 (.333)
- Place: Division: 5th (Pacific); Conference: 14th (Western)
- Playoff finish: Did not qualify
- Stats at Basketball Reference

Local media
- Television: Comcast Sports Net California
- Radio: Sports Radio 1140 The Fan

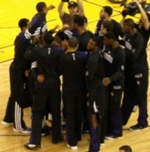
The Kings huddling prior to the tip-off of the 2011–12 exhibition opener against the Golden State Warriors

The 2011–12 Sacramento Kings season was the 67th season of the franchise, its 63rd season in the National Basketball Association (NBA), and its 27th in Sacramento.

== Key dates ==
- June 23: The 2011 NBA draft took place at Prudential Center in Newark, New Jersey.

== Possible relocation ==
Henry Samueli, the owner of the Anaheim Ducks and Anaheim Arena Management, has hoped to bring an NBA franchise to Honda Center in Anaheim since he took control of the arena in the early 2000s. The Sacramento Kings had expressed an interest in relocating to Anaheim from their current stadium, Power Balance Pavilion (formerly ARCO Arena). On March 3, 2011, a lawyer representing the Maloof brothers (owners of the Kings) filed federal trademark applications for names for a new basketball team based in Anaheim. Those names included Anaheim Royals, Los Angeles Royals, Orange County Royals, and Anaheim Royals of Southern California. Of note, the city of Anaheim has mandated that any team playing at Honda Center must use "Anaheim" as its only geographic identifier. This requirement was made after the Los Angeles Angels of Anaheim added 'Los Angeles' to their official name. On May 2, 2011, the Maloofs announced they were staying in Sacramento for at least one more season, to try to make things work with a new Sports and Entertainment Complex in Sacramento.

=== Timeline of events ===
- July 1, 1997: Sacramento obtained a $70 million loan for the Kings. A "Team Owner's Relocation Assurance Agreement" recites that Kings agree to stay in Sacramento for 30 years or until the loan is repaid. But the contract includes a term prohibiting the City of Sacramento from preventing a relocation.
- November 8, 2003: As early as 2003, there had been speculation that the Kings may move to Anaheim. The Los Angeles Times reported that the Maloofs (then owners of the Kings) were interested in purchasing the then-Mighty Ducks of Anaheim who played (and still play) at the Arrowhead Pond/Honda Center. In that same article, Gavin Maloof was quoted as saying that "I think Anaheim would be a plus for the league. The arena is beautiful. The market is so rich. Three teams in that market, it could handle it." This, naturally, set off speculation that the Maloofs were considering a move to Orange County, however, a spokeswoman for the Maloofs quickly shot down the idea calling a possible Kings move to Anaheim "laughable."
- February 13, 2009: Speculation was renewed by the Orange County Register/Sacramento Bee that the Kings may be looking at Southern California as a possible new home.
- September 23, 2010: Anaheim Ducks and Anaheim Arena Management owner Henry Samueli renewed his interest in an NBA franchise relocating to Honda Center.
- December 6, 2010: ESPN, Sports Illustrated, and other news agencies were reporting that Anaheim is on the NBA's short list for a possible franchise relocation. At this time, however, speculation surrounded the New Orleans Hornets franchise and also the cities of Kansas City, Missouri; San Jose, California; Seattle, Washington; and Chicago, Illinois; along with Anaheim.
- January 9, 2011: Randy Youngman of the Orange County Register re-kindled the Kings to Anaheim speculation and the Register continued to publish Kings to Anaheim speculation for a week.
- February 10, 2011: The Sacramento city council unanimously voted to approve ICON and David Taylor to conduct a feasibility study for a new sports and entertainment center in the state capital. The Maloofs, at that time, reportedly agreed to hand over 11 years of financial/arena information documents to help in this study.
- February 19–22, 2011: NBA Commissioner David Stern acknowledged that there are ongoing talks between the Kings and Anaheim officials about a possible relocation during the All-Star festivities at Staples Center in Los Angeles.
- February 25, 2011: The Kings asked for an extension to the relocation filing deadline. The deadline is normally March 1.
- February 28, 2011: Kings fans organized to sell out then-ARCO Arena for a game against the Los Angeles Clippers in response to the relocation rumors.
- March 1, 2011: The NBA moved the relocation filing deadline back from March 1 to April 18 for the Kings.
- March 6, 2011: It was reported that the Taylor/ICON group would delay their report until they knew whether or not the Kings were staying in Sacramento.
- March 23–26, 2011: Jim Crandell reported that there is a possible "game changing" proposal that could keep the Kings in Sacramento. It was later reported, however, that the Maloofs had rejected this plan which calls for a renovation of Power Balance Pavilion.
- March 28, 2011: The Orange County Register reported that an official in the city of Sacramento had sent a letter to the city of Anaheim insisting that they cease negotiations with the Kings because of a $73,725,000 loan that is owed to the capital city by the Maloofs. Kings co-owner quickly shot back, saying that the letter was "below the belt" and that Sacramento should "not interfere with our business." The next day, the Los Angeles Times reported that California state senate president pro tempore Steinberg (D-Sacramento) is considering legislation that would prevent the Kings from moving until the debt is paid in full.
- March 29, 2011: The city of Anaheim unanimously approved a 75 million dollar bond to bring Honda Center up to modern NBA standards.
- April 14, 2011: The NBA Board of Governors met at the St. Regis Hotel in New York City where George Maloof, on behalf of the majority owners, made his case to the other owners that relocation was advisable. Anaheim Mayor Tom Tait, Anaheim City Manager Tom Wood, Anaheim Ducks owner Henry Samueli, and Anaheim Arena Management official Michael Schulman all attended the meetings to make the argument for relocation to their city. Sacramento mayor Kevin Johnson also attended the meetings and made the case why the Kings should remain in California's capital city or why Sacramento deserves a new team if the Kings leave. Johnson also announced during his presentation that Ron Burkle, a billionaire credited with helping keep the Pittsburgh Penguins in their home town, wanted to purchase the Kings franchise and keep them in Sacramento. Burkle's firm later sent out a press release confirming his interest in purchasing the Kings and keeping the NBA in Sacramento. The Orange County Register also reported that the fate of the Kings may be known by Friday, April 15.
- April 15, 2011: At an NBA Board of Governors meeting at the St. Regis Hotel in New York City, the NBA moved the relocation filing deadline for the Kings from March 18 to May 2.
- April 18, 2011: The Kings' second deadline to file for relocation. An extension to May 2 was granted on April 15.
- April 29, 2011: The Orange County Register reported that the relocation committee headed by Oklahoma City Thunder owner has suggested that the Kings remain in Sacramento. In response, Anaheim Ducks owner Henry Samueli upped his offer to the Maloofs, promising to pay for up to 70 million dollars in upgrades to Honda Center. He also reportedly secured 30 million dollars (to counter the 10 million that Sacramento mayor Kevin Johnson secured) in corporate funding and a six-year television deal that would pay out 24 million dollars annually. Samueli also upped his personal loan to the Maloofs to 75 million dollars and offered to buy a minority stake in the Kings. Following this report, the Maloofs have not filed for relocation and the relocation committee has not changed their reported suggestion.
- May 2, 2011: George Maloof announces that the Kings will remain in Sacramento for at least one more season.

=== Cities considered future sites for the Kings ===
The Kings not only looked at Anaheim in relocation plans, the team was offered deals in possible relocations to Kansas City, where the Kings once played until their move to Sacramento in 1985, Cincinnati, where the Kings used to be the Cincinnati Royals from 1957 to 1972, Pittsburgh due to a radio station report about the NHL's Pittsburgh Penguins may purchase the team, Las Vegas where the 2007 NBA All-Star Game, and Seattle the former home of the Oklahoma City Thunder (was the Seattle SuperSonics) when the team moved to Oklahoma in 2006. The Kings wanted to reuse the "Royals" namesake for Anaheim not to confuse with the NHL's Los Angeles Kings whose cross-region rival is the Anaheim Ducks, but if they move to Seattle, they will keep the "Kings" moniker and their closest opponent will be the Portland Trail Blazers in Oregon. ESPN's Basketball Editor in Chief recently told a Seattle Sports Station that Vancouver, British Columbia, Canada is the most "viable" option.

== Draft picks ==
Round	Pick	Player	Position	Nationality	College
1	10	Jimmer Fredette^{¤}	Guard	United States	BYU
2	35	Tyler Honeycutt	Forward	United States	UCLA
2	60	Isaiah Thomas^{¤}	Guard	United States	Washington

¤:Draft rights traded to Sacramento from the Milwaukee Bucks

== Roster ==
2011–12 Sacramento Kings roster
Players

Pos.	No.	Player	Height	Weight	DOB	From
C	15	DeMarcus Cousins	6 ft 11 in (2.11 m)	270 lb (122 kg)	1990–08–13	Kentucky
G	13	Tyreke Evans	6 ft 6 in (1.98 m)	220 lb (100 kg)	1989–09–19	Memphis
G	7	Jimmer Fredette	6 ft 2 in (1.88 m)	195 lb (88 kg)	1989–02–25	BYU
G/F	32	Francisco García	6 ft 7 in (2.01 m)	195 lb (88 kg)	1980–12–31	Louisville
F	20	Donté Greene	6 ft 11 in (2.11 m)	226 lb (103 kg)	1988–02–21	Syracuse
F/C	42	Chuck Hayes	6 ft 6 in (1.98 m)	250 lb (113 kg)	1983–06–11	Kentucky
F	3	Tyler Honeycutt	6 ft 8 in (2.03 m)	188 lb (85 kg)	1990–07–15	UCLA
F	25	Travis Outlaw	6 ft 9 in (2.06 m)	207 lb (94 kg)	1984–09–18	Starkville HS (MS)
G/F	5	John Salmons	6 ft 6 in (1.98 m)	207 lb (94 kg)	1979–12–12	Miami (FL)
G	22	Isaiah Thomas	5 ft 9 in (1.75 m)	185 lb (84 kg)	1989–02–07	Washington
F	34	Jason Thompson	6 ft 11 in (2.11 m)	250 lb (113 kg)	1986–07–21	Rider
G	23	Marcus Thornton	6 ft 4 in (1.93 m)	205 lb (93 kg)	1987–06–05	LSU
C	33	Hassan Whiteside	7 ft 0 in (2.13 m)	235 lb (107 kg)	1989–06–13	Marshall
G/F	55	Terrence Williams	6 ft 6 in (1.98 m)	220 lb (100 kg)	1987–06–28	Louisville

Coaches
Head coach
- Keith Smart
Assistant(s)
- Jim Eyen
- Alex English
- Bobby Jackson

Legend
- (DP) Unsigned draft pick
- (FA) Free agent
- (S) Suspended
- (DL) On assignment to D-League affiliate
- Injured

Roster
Updated: 2012–03–21

== Preseason ==
Due to the 2011 NBA lockout negotiations, the programmed preseason schedule, along with the first two weeks of the regular season, were scrapped, and a two-game preseason was set for each team once the lockout concluded.

2011 pre-season game log
Pre-season: 1–1 (home: 1–0; road: 0–1)

Game	Date	Team	Score	High points	High rebounds	High assists	Location Attendance	Record
1	December 17	@ Golden State	L 96–107	Jimmer Fredette; Marcus Thornton (21)	J. J. Hickson (7)	Tyreke Evans (7)	Oracle Arena; 16,523	1–0
2	December 20	Golden State	W 95–91	Marcus Thornton (21)	DeMarcus Cousins (10)	Tyreke Evans (7)	Power Balance Pavilion; 12,425	1–1

2011–12 season schedule

== Regular season ==
=== Standings ===
Pacific Division	W	L	PCT	GB	Home	Road	Div	GP
y-Los Angeles Lakers	41	25	.621	–	26‍–‍7	15‍–‍18	9–5	66
x-Los Angeles Clippers	40	26	.606	1.0	24‍–‍9	16‍–‍17	7–7	66
Phoenix Suns	33	33	.500	8.0	19‍–‍14	14‍–‍19	9–5	66
Golden State Warriors	23	43	.348	18.0	12‍–‍21	11‍–‍22	7–8	66
Sacramento Kings	22	44	.333	19.0	16‍–‍17	6‍–‍27	3–10	66

Western Conference
#	Team	W	L	PCT	GB	GP
1	c-San Antonio Spurs *	50	16	.758	–	66
2	y-Oklahoma City Thunder *	47	19	.712	3.0	66
3	y-Los Angeles Lakers *	41	25	.621	9.0	66
4	x-Memphis Grizzlies	41	25	.621	9.0	66
5	x-Los Angeles Clippers	40	26	.606	10.0	66
6	x-Denver Nuggets	38	28	.576	12.0	66
7	x-Dallas Mavericks	36	30	.545	14.0	66
8	x-Utah Jazz	36	30	.545	14.0	66
9	Houston Rockets	34	32	.515	16.0	66
10	Phoenix Suns	33	33	.500	17.0	66
11	Portland Trail Blazers	28	38	.424	22.0	66
12	Minnesota Timberwolves	26	40	.394	24.0	66
13	Golden State Warriors	23	43	.348	27.0	66
14	Sacramento Kings	22	44	.333	28.0	66
15	New Orleans Hornets	21	45	.318	29.0	66

=== Game log ===
2011–12 game log
Total: 22–44 (Home: 16–17; Road: 6–27)
December: 1–3 (home: 1–2; road: 0–1)

Game	Date	Team	Score	High points	High rebounds	High assists	Location Attendance	Record
1	December 26	L. A. Lakers	W 100–91	Marcus Thornton (27)	DeMarcus Cousins (11)	Three players (3)	Power Balance Pavilion; 17,317	1–0
2	December 27	@ Portland	L 79–101	DeMarcus Cousins (16)	DeMarcus Cousins; Chuck Hayes (11)	Tyreke Evans; Marcus Thornton (3)	Rose Garden; 20,350	1–1
3	December 29	Chicago	L 98–108	Marcus Thornton (20)	DeMarcus Cousins (12)	Jimmer Fredette; Chuck Hayes (3)	Power Balance Pavilion; 17,317	1–2
4	December 31	New York	L 92–114	Marcus Thornton (14)	Chuck Hayes (13)	DeMarcus Cousins (4)	Power Balance Pavilion; 16,175	1–3

January: 5–12 (home: 3–2; road: 2–10)

Game	Date	Team	Score	High points	High rebounds	High assists	Location Attendance	Record
5	January 1	New Orleans	W 96–80	Tyreke Evans (27)	Chuck Hayes (10)	Jimmer Fredette (5)	Power Balance Pavilion; 13,628	2–3
6	January 3	@ Memphis	L 96–113	Jimmer Fredette (17)	J.J. Hickson (10)	Tyreke Evans (4)	FedEx Forum; 12,391	2–4
7	January 4	@ Denver	L 83–110	DeMarcus Cousins (26)	Three players (5)	Three players (3)	Pepsi Center; 14,562	2–5
8	January 5	Milwaukee	W 103–100	Marcus Thornton (27)	DeMarcus Cousins (15)	Tyreke Evans (5)	Power Balance Pavilion; 11,813	3–5
9	January 8	Orlando	L 97–104	Tyreke Evans (28)	J. J. Hickson (11)	Tyreke Evans (8)	Power Balance Pavilion; 14,150	3–6
10	January 10	@ Philadelphia	L 85–112	DeMarcus Cousins (17)	DeMarcus Cousins (10)	Francisco García (4)	Wells Fargo Center; 10,255	3–7
11	January 11	@ Toronto	W 98–91	Tyreke Evans (29)	DeMarcus Cousins (19)	Isaiah Thomas (6)	Air Canada Centre; 14,323	4–7
12	January 13	@ Houston	L 89–103	Tyreke Evans (27)	Donté Greene (8)	Tyreke Evans; Isaiah Thomas (5)	Toyota Center; 12,870	4–8
13	January 14	@ Dallas	L 60–99	Marcus Thornton (14)	DeMarcus Cousins (10)	Tyreke Evans; John Salmons (3)	American Airlines Center; 20,313	4–9
14	January 16	@ Minnesota	L 86–99	Three players (12)	Tyreke Evans (8)	Tyreke Evans (10)	Target Center; 16,159	4–10
15	January 18	Indiana	W 92–88	Marcus Thornton (17)	DeMarcus Cousins (19)	Tyreke Evans (6)	Power Balance Pavilion; 14,170	5–10
16	January 20	@ San Antonio	W 88–86	Tyreke Evans (23)	DeMarcus Cousins (13)	Tyreke Evans (7)	AT&T Center; 18,581	6–10
17	January 21	@ Memphis	L 95–128	Jimmer Fredette (20)	DeMarcus Cousins (11)	Three players (5)	FedEx Forum; 16,562	6–11
18	January 23	@ Portland	L 89–101	DeMarcus Cousins (18)	DeMarcus Cousins (13)	Isaiah Thomas (8)	Power Balance Pavilion; 20,363	6–12
19	January 25	Denver	L 93–122	Jimmer Fredette (19)	DeMarcus Cousins (15)	Tyreke Evans (7)	Power Balance Pavilion; 12,097	6–13
20	January 28	@ Utah	L 93–96	Tyreke Evans (31)	DeMarcus Cousins (9)	Tyreke Evans (9)	EnergySolutions Arena; 19,911	6–14
21	January 31	@ Golden State	L 90–93	Tyreke Evans (22)	DeMarcus Cousins (14)	Tyreke Evans (9)	Oracle Arena; 17,753	6–15

February : 6–7 (home: 4–1; road: 2–6)

Game	Date	Team	Score	High points	High rebounds	High assists	Location Attendance	Record
22	February 2	Portland	W 95–92	Marcus Thornton (20)	Jason Thompson (12)	Tyreke Evans (5)	Power Balance Pavilion; 11,740	7–15
23	February 4	Golden State	W 114–106 (OT)	Marcus Thornton (28)	DeMarcus Cousins (20)	Tyreke Evans (9)	Power Balance Pavilion; 16,411	8–15
24	February 6	@ New Orleans	W 100–92	DeMarcus Cousins (28)	DeMarcus Cousins (19)	Isaiah Thomas (6)	New Orleans Arena; 13,222	9–15
25	February 7	@ Minnesota	L 84–86	Marcus Thornton (22)	DeMarcus Cousins; J. J. Hickson (11)	Tyreke Evans; Isaiah Thomas (4)	Target Center; 14,073	9–16
26	February 9	Oklahoma City	W 106–101	Tyreke Evans (22)	Jason Thompson (10)	Tyreke Evans (5)	Power Balance Pavilion; 17,317	10–16
27	February 11	Phoenix	L 84–98	DeMarcus Cousins (26)	DeMarcus Cousins (9)	Tyreke Evans (5)	Power Balance Pavilion; 16,964	10–17
28	February 14	@ Chicago	L 115–121	DeMarcus Cousins (28)	DeMarcus Cousins (17)	Tyreke Evans (8)	United Center; 21,936	10–18
29	February 15	@ New York	L 85–100	Tyreke Evans (19)	J. J. Hickson (6)	Tyreke Evans (5)	Madison Square Garden; 19,763	10–19
30	February 17	@ Detroit	L 108–114	DeMarcus Cousins (26)	DeMarcus Cousins (15)	Tyreke Evans (9)	The Palace of Auburn Hills; 14,686	10–20
31	February 19	@ Cleveland	L 92–93	Isaiah Thomas (23)	Marcus Thornton (10)	Isaiah Thomas (11)	Quicken Loans Arena; 16,812	10–21
32	February 21	@ Miami	L 108–120	Isaiah Thomas (24)	Jason Thompson (10)	Tyreke Evans (10)	American Airlines Arena; 20,068	10–22
33	February 22	@ Washington	W 115–107	Tyreke Evans; Marcus Thornton (22)	DeMarcus Cousins (16)	Isaiah Thomas (6)	Verizon Center; 17,085	11–22
34	February 28	Utah	W 103–96	DeMarcus Cousins (22)	DeMarcus Cousins (18)	Isaiah Thomas (8)	Power Balance Pavilion; 13,896	12–22

March: 6–12 (home: 5–7; road: 1–5)

Game	Date	Team	Score	High points	High rebounds	High assists	Location Attendance	Record
35	March 1	L. A. Clippers	L 100–108	DeMarcus Cousins (23)	DeMarcus Cousins (10)	Isaiah Thomas (4)	Power Balance Pavilion; 15,512	12–23
36	March 2	@ L. A. Lakers	L 107–115	Francisco García (18)	DeMarcus Cousins (13)	Isaiah Thomas (6)	Staples Center; 18,997	12–24
37	March 4	@ Phoenix	L 88–96	Marcus Thornton (21)	DeMarcus Cousins (14)	Tyreke Evans (6)	US Airways Center; 15,026	12–25
38	March 5	@ Denver	L 116–119 (OT)	Tyreke Evans, Marcus Thornton (27)	Jason Thompson (8)	DeMarcus Cousins, John Salmons (5)	Pepsi Center; 14,823	12–26
39	March 7	New Orleans	W 99–98	Marcus Thornton (25)	Jason Thompson (8)	Jimmer Fredette (5)	Power Balance Pavilion; 13,487	13–26
40	March 9	Dallas	W 110–97	Tyreke Evans; Marcus Thornton (17)	Tyreke Evans (9)	DeMarcus Cousins; Isaiah Thomas (5)	Power Balance Pavilion; 16,857	14–26
41	March 11	Atlanta	L 99–106	DeMarcus Cousins (28)	DeMarcus Cousins (12)	Tyreke Evans (7)	Power Balance Pavilion; 13,976	14–27
42	March 13	Golden State	L 89–115	DeMarcus Cousins (19)	DeMarcus Cousins (12)	Marcus Thornton (3)	Power Balance Pavilion; 12,011	14–28
43	March 14	Detroit	L 112–124	Tyreke Evans (23)	Jason Thompson (15)	Marcus Thornton (6)	Power Balance Pavilion; 12,173	14–29
44	March 16	Boston	W 120–95	Marcus Thornton (36)	Jason Thompson (15)	Isaiah Thomas (10)	Power Balance Pavilion; 17,317	15–29
45	March 18	Minnesota	W 115–99	Marcus Thornton (24)	Jason Thompson (10)	Jimmer Fredette; Marcus Thornton (4)	Power Balance Pavilion; 15,616	16–29
46	March 20	Memphis	W 119–110	Marcus Thornton (31)	Jason Thompson (13)	Isaiah Thomas (7)	Power Balance Pavilion; 11,105	17–29
47	March 22	Utah	L 102–103	Tyreke Evans (25)	DeMarcus Cousins (18)	Isaiah Thomas (7)	Power Balance Pavilion; 11,646	17–30
48	March 24	@ Golden State	L 108–111	DeMarcus Cousins (28)	DeMarcus Cousins (18)	DeMarcus Cousins; Isaiah Thomas (5)	Oracle Arena; 19,596	17–31
49	March 26	@ Houston	L 106–113 (OT)	DeMarcus Cousins (38)	DeMarcus Cousins (14)	Isaiah Thomas (6)	Toyota Center; 13,572	17–32
50	March 28	San Antonio	L 112–117	Isaiah Thomas (28)	DeMarcus Cousins (11)	Isaiah Thomas (10)	Power Balance Pavilion; 13,119	17–33
51	March 30	@ Utah	W 104–103	DeMarcus Cousins (27)	DeMarcus Cousins (14)	Isaiah Thomas (6)	EnergySolutions Arena; 19,911	18–33
52	March 31	New Jersey	L 99–111	Tyreke Evans (23)	Jason Thompson (10)	Isaiah Thomas (6)	Power Balance Pavilion; 14,370	18–34

April: 4–10 (home: 3–5; road: 1–5)

Game	Date	Team	Score	High points	High rebounds	High assists	Location Attendance	Record
53	April 2	Minnesota	W 116–108	Tyreke Evans (24)	Terrence Williams (12)	Tyreke Evans (7)	Power Balance Pavilion; 12,279	19–34
54	April 3	Phoenix	L 100–109	DeMarcus Cousins (41)	DeMarcus Cousins (12)	Isaiah Thomas (7)	Power Balance Pavilion; 12,462	19–35
55	April 5	L. A. Clippers	L 85–93	Isaiah Thomas (17)	Jason Thompson (16)	Tyreke Evans (6)	Power Balance Pavilion; 14,411	19–36
56	April 7	@ L. A. Clippers	L 94–109	DeMarcus Cousins (15)	DeMarcus Cousins (20)	Terrence Williams (9)	Staples Center; 19,060	19–37
57	April 8	Houston	L 87–104	Terrence Williams (21)	Hassan Whiteside (10)	Isaiah Thomas (6)	Power Balance Pavilion; 13,299	19–38
58	April 10	@ Dallas	L 100–110	DeMarcus Cousins (25)	DeMarcus Cousins (18)	Tyreke Evans; Isaiah Thomas (5)	American Airlines Center; 20,241	19–39
59	April 11	@ New Orleans	L 96–105	Marcus Thornton (25)	Jason Thompson (7)	Tyreke Evans (8)	New Orleans Arena; 16,906	19–40
60	April 13	@ Oklahoma City	L 89–115	Isaiah Thomas (21)	DeMarcus Cousins (12)	Terrence Williams (6)	Chesapeake Energy Arena; 18,203	19–41
61	April 15	Portland	W 104–103	DeMarcus Cousins (23)	DeMarcus Cousins; Chuck Hayes (7)	Isaiah Thomas (8)	Power Balance Pavilion; 16,012	20–41
62	April 18	San Antonio	L 102–127	Isaiah Thomas (21)	DeMarcus Cousins (9)	Isaiah Thomas; Terrence Williams (8)	Power Balance Pavilion; 16,954	20–42
63	April 20	Oklahoma City	L 92–103	DeMarcus Cousins (18)	DeMarcus Cousins (9)	Chuck Hayes (5)	Power Balance Pavilion; 16,882	20–43
64	April 22	@ Charlotte	W 114–88	DeMarcus Cousins (29)	Jason Thompson (11)	Jason Thompson (7)	Time Warner Cable Arena; 11,317	21–43
65	April 24	@ Oklahoma City	L 110–118	DeMarcus Cousins (32)	DeMarcus Cousins; Travis Outlaw (7)	Isaiah Thomas (9)	Chesapeake Energy Arena; 18,203	21–44
66	April 26	L. A. Lakers	W 113–96	DeMarcus Cousins (23)	DeMarcus Cousins (19)	Isaiah Thomas (7)	Power Balance Pavilion; 16,281	22–44

2011–12 season schedule

== Player statistics ==
Legend
GP	Games played	GS	Games started	MPG	Minutes per game
FG%	Field-goal percentage	3P%	3-point field-goal percentage	FT%	Free-throw percentage
RPG	Rebounds per game	APG	Assists per game	SPG	Steals per game
BPG	Blocks per game	PPG	Points per game

=== Regular season ===
Player	GP	GS	MPG	FG%	3P%	FT%	RPG	APG	SPG	BPG	PPG
Isaiah Thomas	65	37	25.5	.448	.379	.832	2.6	4.1	.8	.1	11.5
DeMarcus Cousins	64	62	30.5	.448	.143	.702	11.0	1.6	1.5	1.2	18.1
Jason Thompson	64	47	25.9	.535	.000	.602	6.9	1.2	.7	.7	9.1
Tyreke Evans	63	61	34.3	.453	.202	.779	4.6	4.5	1.3	.5	16.5
Jimmer Fredette	61	7	18.6	.386	.361	.833	1.2	1.8	.5	.0	7.6
Chuck Hayes	54	9	19.2	.429	.000	.667	4.3	1.4	.7	.3	3.2
Donté Greene	53	7	14.7	.406	.238	.800	2.5	.6	.3	.5	5.4
Marcus Thornton	51	51	34.9	.438	.345	.865	3.7	1.9	1.4	.2	18.7
Francisco García	49	3	16.3	.376	.290	.800	2.0	.6	.7	.8	4.8
John Salmons	46	32	27.2	.409	.295	.644	2.9	2.0	.8	.2	7.5
Travis Outlaw	39	5	12.8	.343	.267	.674	1.6	.4	.5	.5	4.3
JJ Hickson^{†}	35	9	18.4	.370	.000	.638	5.1	.6	.5	.5	4.7
Terrence Williams^{†}	18	0	20.5	.461	.296	.618	4.1	3.1	.9	.3	8.8
Hassan Whiteside	18	0	6.1	.444		.417	2.2	.0	.2	.8	1.6
Tyler Honeycutt	15	0	5.9	.333	.333	.600	.9	.5	.3	.2	1.3

- ^{†} Denotes player spent time with another team in the season. Stats reflect time with the Kings only.

== Transactions ==
=== Trades ===
June 23, 2011	To Milwaukee Bucks----Stephen Jackson; Shaun Livingston; Beno Udrih; Draft rights to Tobias Harris	To Charlotte Bobcats----Corey Maggette; Draft rights to Bismack Biyombo----To Sacramento Kings----John Salmons; Draft rights to Jimmer Fredette
June 30, 2011	To Sacramento Kings----J.J. Hickson	To Cleveland Cavaliers----Omri Casspi; 2012 first-round pick

=== Free agents ===
Additions
Player	Date signed	Former team
Marcus Thornton	December 9	Sacramento Kings
Travis Outlaw	December 17	New Jersey Nets
Chuck Hayes	December 23	Houston Rockets
Terrence Williams	March 31	Sacramento Kings (previously signed a 10-day contract)

Subtractions
Player	Date signed	New team
Marquis Daniels	December 9	Boston Celtics
Samuel Dalembert	December 26	Houston Rockets
Jermaine Taylor		Rio Grande Valley Vipers

== See also ==
- 2011–12 NBA season
