= 2011–12 Golden State Warriors season =

NBA professional basketball team season

- Head coach: Mark Jackson
- General manager: Larry Riley
- Owners: Joe Lacob
- Arena: Oracle Arena

Results
- Record: 23–43 (.348)
- Place: Division: 4th (Pacific); Conference: 13th (Western)
- Playoff finish: Did not qualify
- Stats at Basketball Reference

The 2011–12 Golden State Warriors season was the 66th season of the franchise in the National Basketball Association (NBA), and the 50th anniversary of their time in the San Francisco Bay Area. The Warriors hired former NBA player and ESPN color commentator Mark Jackson as their head coach during the lockout, and finished with a 23–43 win–loss record. This was the last time the Warriors failed to qualify for the playoffs until 2020.

== Draft ==
Round	Pick	Player	Position	Nationality	School / club team
1	11	Klay Thompson	SG	United States	Washington State (Jr.)
2	44	Charles Jenkins	PG/ SG	United States	Hofstra (Sr.)

== Preseason ==
Due to the 2011 NBA lockout negotiations, the programmed preseason schedule, along with the first two weeks of the regular season, were scrapped, and a two-game preseason was set for each team once the lockout concluded.

== Pre-season ==
2011 pre-season game log
Total: 1–1 (Home: 1–0; Road: 0–1)
Pre-season: 1–1 (home: 1–0; road: 0–1)

Game	Date	Team	Score	High points	High rebounds	High assists	Location Attendance	Record
1	December 17	Sacramento	W 107–96	Stephen Curry (22)	David Lee (8)	Monta Ellis (8)	Oracle Arena; 16,523	1–0
2	December 20	@ Sacramento	L 91–95	David Lee (30)	David Lee (13)	Monta Ellis (6)	Power Balance Pavilion; 12,425	1-1

2011–12 season schedule

== Regular season ==
=== Standings ===
==== Division ====
Pacific Division	W	L	PCT	GB	Home	Road	Div	GP
y-Los Angeles Lakers	41	25	.621	–	26‍–‍7	15‍–‍18	9–5	66
x-Los Angeles Clippers	40	26	.606	1.0	24‍–‍9	16‍–‍17	7–7	66
Phoenix Suns	33	33	.500	8.0	19‍–‍14	14‍–‍19	9–5	66
Golden State Warriors	23	43	.348	18.0	12‍–‍21	11‍–‍22	7–8	66
Sacramento Kings	22	44	.333	19.0	16‍–‍17	6‍–‍27	3–10	66

==== Conference ====
Western Conference
#	Team	W	L	PCT	GB	GP
1	c-San Antonio Spurs *	50	16	.758	–	66
2	y-Oklahoma City Thunder *	47	19	.712	3.0	66
3	y-Los Angeles Lakers *	41	25	.621	9.0	66
4	x-Memphis Grizzlies	41	25	.621	9.0	66
5	x-Los Angeles Clippers	40	26	.606	10.0	66
6	x-Denver Nuggets	38	28	.576	12.0	66
7	x-Dallas Mavericks	36	30	.545	14.0	66
8	x-Utah Jazz	36	30	.545	14.0	66
9	Houston Rockets	34	32	.515	16.0	66
10	Phoenix Suns	33	33	.500	17.0	66
11	Portland Trail Blazers	28	38	.424	22.0	66
12	Minnesota Timberwolves	26	40	.394	24.0	66
13	Golden State Warriors	23	43	.348	27.0	66
14	Sacramento Kings	22	44	.333	28.0	66
15	New Orleans Hornets	21	45	.318	29.0	66

=== Game log ===
2011–12 game log
Total: 23–43 (Home: 12–21; Road: 11–22)
December: 2–2 (home: 2–2; road: 0–0)

Game	Date	Team	Score	High points	High rebounds	High assists	Location Attendance	Record
1	December 25	L. A. Clippers	L 86–105	David Lee (21)	David Lee (12)	Monta Ellis (8)	Oracle Arena; 19,596	0–1
2	December 26	Chicago	W 99–91	Monta Ellis (26)	Lee, Curry (7)	Stephen Curry (10)	Oracle Arena; 19,596	1–1
3	December 28	New York	W 92–78	Monta Ellis (22)	Kwame Brown (10)	Monta Ellis (8)	Oracle Arena; 19,596	2–1
4	December 31	Philadelphia	L 79–107	Stephen Curry (21)	Ekpe Udoh (9)	Ish Smith (5)	Oracle Arena; 19,084	2–2

January: 5–10 (home: 3–5; road: 2–5)

Game	Date	Team	Score	High points	High rebounds	High assists	Location Attendance	Record
5	January 2	@ Phoenix	L 91–102	Monta Ellis (18)	David Lee (9)	Monta Ellis (11)	US Airways Center; 14,793	2–3
6	January 4	@ San Antonio	L 95–101	Monta Ellis (38)	David Lee (10)	Stephen Curry (8)	AT&T Center; 16,751	2–4
7	January 6	@ L. A. Lakers	L 90–97	Monta Ellis (18)	David Lee (11)	Monta Ellis (10)	Staples Center; 18,997	2–5
8	January 7	Utah	L 87–88	Monta Ellis (32)	David Lee (15)	Monta Ellis (6)	Oracle Arena; 19,596	2–6
9	January 10	Miami	W 111–106	Nate Robinson (24)	David Lee (14)	Nate Robinson (5)	Oracle Arena; 19,596	3–6
10	January 12	Orlando	L 109–117	Monta Ellis (30)	David Lee (12)	Monta Ellis (11)	Oracle Arena; 17,754	3–7
11	January 14	@ Charlotte	L 100–112	David Lee (24)	David Lee (16)	Monta Ellis (6)	Time Warner Cable Arena; 16,112	3–8
12	January 15	@ Detroit	W 99–91	David Lee (24)	Dorell Wright (11)	Monta Ellis (7)	The Palace of Auburn Hills; 11,774	4–8
13	January 17	@ Cleveland	W 105–95	David Lee (29)	Andris Biedriņš (11)	Nate Robinson (10)	Quicken Loans Arena; 13,056	5–8
14	January 18	@ New Jersey	L 100–107	Monta Ellis (30)	David Lee (11)	Nate Robinson (7)	Prudential Center; 12,570	5–9
15	January 20	Indiana	L 91–94	Monta Ellis (25)	David Lee (14)	Monta Ellis (6)	Oracle Arena; 17,621	5–10
16	January 23	Memphis	L 90–91	Monta Ellis (20)	David Lee (12)	Nate Robinson (6)	Oracle Arena; 17,549	5–11
17	January 25	Portland	W 101–93	Stephen Curry (32)	Ekpe Udoh (7)	Monta Ellis (12)	Oracle Arena; 17,923	6–11
18	January 27	Oklahoma City	L 109–120	Dorell Wright (23)	Dorell Wright (9)	Ellis, Curry (6)	Oracle Arena; 19,596	6–12
19	January 31	Sacramento	W 93–90	Brandon Rush (20)	Brandon Rush (6)	Stephen Curry (8)	Oracle Arena; 17,753	7–12

February : 7–6 (home: 4–2; road: 3–4)

Game	Date	Team	Score	High points	High rebounds	High assists	Location Attendance	Record
20	February 2	Utah	W 119–101	Monta Ellis (33)	David Lee (14)	Stephen Curry (12)	Oracle Arena; 18,123	8–12
21	February 4	@ Sacramento	L 106–114 (OT)	Dorell Wright (24)	Lee, Biedriņš (5)	Stephen Curry (9)	Power Balance Pavilion; 16,411	8–13
22	February 7	Oklahoma City	L 116–119	Monta Ellis (48)	David Lee (11)	Curry, Lee (10)	Oracle Arena; 17,971	8–14
23	February 9	@ Denver	W 109–101	Stephen Curry (36)	Lee, Biedriņš (8)	Stephen Curry (7)	Pepsi Center; 14,960	9–14
24	February 12	Houston	W 106–97	Monta Ellis (33)	David Lee (13)	Monta Ellis (7)	Oracle Arena; 19,596	10–14
25	February 13	Phoenix	W 102–96	David Lee (28)	David Lee (12)	Stephen Curry (5)	Oracle Arena; 19,106	11–14
26	February 15	Portland	L 91–93	David Lee (29)	David Lee (11)	Stephen Curry (8)	Oracle Arena; 17,934	11–15
27	February 17	@ Oklahoma City	L 87–110	David Lee (23)	Dorell Wright (11)	Ellis, Curry (4)	Chesapeake Energy Arena; 18,203	11–16
28	February 18	@ Memphis	L 103–104	Stephen Curry (36)	David Lee (9)	Ellis, Curry (6)	FedEx Forum; 17,151	11–17
29	February 20	L. A. Clippers	W 104–97	Monta Ellis (32)	David Lee (13)	Stephen Curry (6)	Oracle Arena; 19,596	12–17
30	February 22	@ Phoenix	W 106–104	Monta Ellis (26)	Dominic McGuire (9)	Monta Ellis (6)	US Airways Center; 14,558	13–17
31	February 28	@ Indiana	L 78–102	Ellis, Rush (14)	Brandon Rush (7)	Lee, Robinson (4)	Bankers Life Fieldhouse; 12,111	13–18
32	February 29	@ Atlanta	W 85–82	Monta Ellis (24)	Dominic McGuire (15)	Monta Ellis (8)	Philips Arena; 13,049	14–18

March: 6–12 (home: 2–7; road: 4–5)

Game	Date	Team	Score	High points	High rebounds	High assists	Location Attendance	Record
33	March 2	@ Philadelphia	L 83–105	David Lee (24)	David Lee (15)	Monta Ellis (7)	Wells Fargo Center; 18,323	14–19
34	March 4	@ Toronto	L 75–83	David Lee (22)	David Lee (12)	Monta Ellis (7)	Air Canada Centre; 18,056	14–20
35	March 5	@ Washington	W 120–100	Monta Ellis (25)	David Lee (10)	Monta Ellis (8)	Verizon Center; 17,843	15–20
36	March 7	Memphis	L 92–110	Ellis, Thompson (16)	3 players tied (6)	Robinson, Udoh (4)	Oracle Arena; 19,171	15–21
37	March 10	Dallas	W 111–87	David Lee (25)	David Lee (9)	Monta Ellis (8)	Oracle Arena; 19,596	16–21
38	March 11	@ L. A. Clippers	W 97–93	Monta Ellis (21)	David Lee (10)	Monta Ellis (11)	Staples Center; 19,183	17–21
39	March 13	@ Sacramento	W 115–89	3 players tied (17)	Dorell Wright (10)	Klay Thompson (5)	Power Balance Pavilion; 12,011	18–21
40	March 14	Boston	L 103–105	Klay Thompson (26)	David Lee (8)	Nate Robinson (11)	Oracle Arena; 19,596	18–22
41	March 16	Milwaukee	L 98–120	David Lee (22)	David Lee (9)	Nate Robinson (6)	Oracle Arena; 19,596	18–23
42	March 17	@ Utah	L 92–99 (OT)	Nate Robinson (19)	Dorell Wright (10)	Nate Robinson (4)	EnergySolutions Arena; 17,854	18–24
43	March 19	Minnesota	L 93–97	David Lee (25)	Lee, McGuire (9)	Nate Robinson (7)	Oracle Arena; 19,596	18–25
44	March 21	@ New Orleans	W 101–92	Klay Thompson (27)	David Lee (11)	Nate Robinson (10)	New Orleans Arena; 13,959	19–25
45	March 22	@ Houston	L 83–109	Richard Jefferson (14)	Dominic McGuire (6)	Charles Jenkins (6)	Toyota Center; 15,325	19–26
46	March 24	Sacramento	W 111–108	Klay Thompson (31)	David Lee (14)	David Lee (9)	Oracle Arena; 19,596	20–26
47	March 25	@ Portland	L 87–90	Charles Jenkins (27)	David Lee (16)	Charles Jenkins (6)	Rose Garden; 20,636	20–27
48	March 27	L. A. Lakers	L 101–104	Lee, Rush (23)	David Lee (9)	Klay Thompson (7)	Oracle Arena; 19,596	20–28
49	March 28	New Orleans	L 87–102	David Lee (28)	David Lee (7)	Nate Robinson (6)	Oracle Arena; 18,771	20–29
50	March 30	New Jersey	L 100–102	David Lee (27)	Dominic McGuire (9)	Charles Jenkins (12)	Oracle Arena; 19,596	20–30

April : 3–14 (home: 1–6; road: 2–8)

Game	Date	Team	Score	High points	High rebounds	High assists	Location Attendance	Record
51	April 1	@ L. A. Lakers	L 112–120	David Lee (27)	David Lee (6)	Lee, Robinson (7)	Staples Center; 18,897	20–31
52	April 3	@ Memphis	L 94–98	David Lee (22)	David Lee (13)	Nate Robinson (5)	FedEx Forum; 14,310	20–32
53	April 4	@ Minnesota	W 97–94	David Lee (31)	David Lee (8)	Charles Jenkins (7)	Target Center; 17,161	21–32
54	April 6	@ Utah	L 98–104	David Lee (26)	David Lee (12)	Charles Jenkins (7)	EnergySolutions Arena; 18,933	21–33
55	April 7	Denver	W 112–97	Rush (20)	David Lee (9)	Charles Jenkins (8)	Oracle Arena; 18,942	22–33
56	April 9	@ Denver	L 84–123	Klay Thompson (17)	Mickell Gladness (5)	Nate Robinson (5)	Pepsi Center; 15,530	22–34
57	April 11	@ Portland	L 110–118	David Lee (21)	David Lee (14)	Nate Robinson (8)	Rose Garden; 20,502	22–35
58	April 12	Dallas	L 103–112	David Lee (30)	David Lee (8)	Klay Thompson (8)	Oracle Arena; 17,929	22–36
59	April 14	@ L. A. Clippers	L 104–112	Nate Robinson (28)	Dominic McGuire (11)	Nate Robinson (8)	Staples Center; 19,060	22–37
60	April 16	San Antonio	L 99–120	Nate Robinson (30)	Jeremy Tyler (10)	Nate Robinson (7)	Oracle Arena; 18,471	22–38
61	April 18	L. A. Lakers	L 87–99	Klay Thompson (17)	Dorell Wright (7)	Charles Jenkins (11)	Oracle Arena; 18,547	22–39
62	April 20	@ Dallas	L 94–104	Klay Thompson (26)	Brandon Rush (8)	Charles Jenkins (10)	American Airlines Center; 20547	22–40
63	April 21	@ Houston	L 96–99	Klay Thompson (24)	Brandon Rush (7)	Charles Jenkins (8)	Toyota Center; 15436	22–41
64	April 22	@ Minnesota	W 93–88	Charles Jenkins (24)	Brandon Rush (9)	Charles Jenkins (9)	Target Center; 15872	23–41
65	April 24	New Orleans	L 81–83	Klay Thompson (16)	Jeremy Tyler (8)	Charles Jenkins (10)	Oracle Arena; 17598	23–42
66	April 26	San Antonio	L 101–107	Dorell Wright (25)	Jeremy Tyler (9)	Dominic McGuire (8)	Oracle Arena; 18124	23–43

2011–12 season schedule

== Roster ==
2011–12 Golden State Warriors roster
Players

Pos.	No.	Player	Height	Weight	DOB	From
C	15	Andris Biedriņš	7 ft 0 in (2.13 m)	240 lb (109 kg)	1986–04–02	Latvia
C	12	Andrew Bogut	7 ft 0 in (2.13 m)	260 lb (118 kg)	1984–11–28	Utah
PG	30	Stephen Curry	6 ft 3 in (1.91 m)	185 lb (84 kg)	1988–03–14	Davidson
C	32	Mickell Gladness	6 ft 11 in (2.11 m)	220 lb (100 kg)	1986–07–26	Alabama A&M
SF	44	Richard Jefferson	6 ft 7 in (2.01 m)	230 lb (104 kg)	1980–06–21	Arizona
G	22	Charles Jenkins	6 ft 3 in (1.91 m)	220 lb (100 kg)	1989–02–28	Hofstra
F/C	10	David Lee	6 ft 9 in (2.06 m)	240 lb (109 kg)	1983–04–29	Florida
F	5	Dominic McGuire	6 ft 9 in (2.06 m)	220 lb (100 kg)	1985–10–20	Fresno State
C	31	Mikki Moore	7 ft 0 in (2.13 m)	225 lb (102 kg)	1975–11–04	Nebraska
PG	2	Nate Robinson	5 ft 9 in (1.75 m)	180 lb (82 kg)	1984–05–31	Washington
G	4	Brandon Rush	6 ft 6 in (1.98 m)	210 lb (95 kg)	1985–07–07	Kansas
SG	11	Klay Thompson	6 ft 7 in (2.01 m)	205 lb (93 kg)	1990–02–08	Washington State
F/C	3	Jeremy Tyler	6 ft 10 in (2.08 m)	260 lb (118 kg)	1991–06–21	San Diego HS (CA)
F	1	Dorell Wright	6 ft 9 in (2.06 m)	205 lb (93 kg)	1985–12–02	South Kent HS (CT)
F	33	Chris Wright	6 ft 8 in (2.03 m)	230 lb (104 kg)	1988–09–30	Dayton

Coaches
Head coach
- Mark Jackson
Assistant(s)
- Michael Malone
- Pete Myers
- Wes Unseld Jr.
- Jerry DeGregorio
- Darren Erman
- Kris Weems

Legend
- (DP) Unsigned draft pick
- (FA) Free agent
- (S) Suspended
- (DL) On assignment to D-League affiliate
- Injured

Roster
Updated: 2012–04–04

== Player statistics ==
Legend
GP	Games played	GS	Games started	MPG	Minutes per game
FG%	Field-goal percentage	3P%	3-point field-goal percentage	FT%	Free-throw percentage
RPG	Rebounds per game	APG	Assists per game	SPG	Steals per game
BPG	Blocks per game	PPG	Points per game

=== Regular season ===
Player	GP	GS	MPG	FG%	3P%	FT%	RPG	APG	SPG	BPG	PPG
Klay Thompson	66	29	24.4	.443	.414	.868	2.4	2.0	.7	.3	12.5
Brandon Rush	65	1	26.4	.501	.452	.793	3.9	1.4	.5	.9	9.8
Dominic McGuire	64	6	17.6	.448	.000	.736	3.8	1.7	.7	.6	3.5
Dorell Wright	61	61	27.0	.422	.360	.816	4.6	1.5	1.0	.4	10.3
David Lee	57	57	37.2	.503	.000	.782	9.6	2.8	.9	.4	20.1
Charles Jenkins	51	28	17.5	.447	.150	.872	1.3	3.3	.6	.1	5.8
Nate Robinson	51	9	23.4	.424	.365	.832	2.0	4.5	1.2	.0	11.2
Andris Biedriņš	47	35	15.7	.609		.111	3.7	.3	.5	1.0	1.7
Jeremy Tyler	42	23	13.5	.421	.000	.558	3.3	.4	.4	.5	4.9
Ekpe Udoh^{†}	38	6	21.8	.443		.719	3.9	.8	.7	1.7	5.5
Monta Ellis^{†}	37	37	36.9	.433	.321	.812	3.4	6.0	1.5	.3	21.9
Stephen Curry	26	23	28.2	.490	.455	.809	3.4	5.3	1.5	.3	14.7
Chris Wright	24	1	7.8	.511		.774	1.9	.2	.3	.5	2.9
Richard Jefferson^{†}	22	3	26.4	.420	.418	.686	3.5	1.5	.5	.3	9.0
Mickell Gladness^{†}	18	7	12.4	.429		.500	2.6	.2	.2	1.1	3.0
Kwame Brown	9	3	20.8	.525		.441	6.3	.4	.9	.0	6.3
Mikki Moore	7	0	16.9	.450		.857	3.1	.7	.4	.4	3.4
Ish Smith^{†}	6	1	10.5	.400	.400	.500	1.5	1.5	.7	.0	4.5
Keith Benson	3	0	3.0	.000			1.0	.0	.0	.0	.0
Earl Barron	2	0	4.5	.500			.5	.0	.0	.0	2.0

- ^{†} Denotes player spent time with another team in the season. Stats reflect time with the Warriors only.

== Transactions ==
=== Trades ===
June 23, 2011	To Golden State Warriors • Draft rights to (United States) Jeremy Tyler	To Charlotte Bobcats • Cash considerations
December 19, 2011	To Golden State Warriors • (United States) Brandon Rush	To Indiana Pacers • (United States) Louis Amundson
March 13, 2012	To Golden State Warriors • (Australia) Andrew Bogut • (United States) Stephen Jackson	To Milwaukee Bucks • (United States) Monta Ellis • (United States) Ekpe Udoh • (United States) Kwame Brown
March 15, 2012	To Golden State Warriors • 2012 second-round pick	To Atlanta Hawks • Cash considerations
March 15, 2012	To Golden State Warriors • (United States) Richard Jefferson • (United States) T. J. Ford • Conditional 2012 1st-round pick	To San Antonio Spurs • (United States) Stephen Jackson

=== Free agency ===
==== Additions ====
Player	Signed	Former team
(United States) Chris Wright		Maine Red Claws (NBA D-League)
(United States) Kwame Brown	1-year contract worth $7 million	Charlotte Bobcats
(United States) Dominic McGuire	1-year contract worth $1 million	Charlotte Bobcats
(United States) Ish Smith		Memphis Grizzlies
(United States) Nate Robinson		Oklahoma City Thunder
(United States) Earl Barron		Portland Trail Blazers
(United States) Mickell Gladness		Miami Heat
(United States) Keith Benson		Sioux Falls Skyforce (NBA D-League)
(United States) Mikki Moore		Idaho Stampede (NBA D-League)

==== Subtractions ====
Player	Reason left	New team
(United States) Jeff Adrien	Waived	Houston Rockets
(Serbia) Vladimir Radmanović	—	Atlanta Hawks
(United States) Jeremy Lin	Waived	New York Knicks
(United States) Charlie Bell	Waived	Juvecaserta Basket (Italy)
(United States) Reggie Williams	2-year contract worth $5 million	Charlotte Bobcats
(United States) Ish Smith	Waived	Orlando Magic
(United States) Earl Barron	Waived	Meralco Bolts (Philippines)
(United States) T. J. Ford	Waived	—N/a
