= 2010–11 Houston Rockets season =

- Head coach: Rick Adelman
- General manager: Daryl Morey
- Owners: Leslie Alexander
- Arena: Toyota Center

Results
- Record: 43–39 (.524)
- Place: Division: 5th (Southwest); Conference: 9th (Western)
- Playoff finish: Did not qualify
- Stats at Basketball Reference

Local media
- Television: FS Houston, KTXH
- Radio: Sports Radio 610

The 2010–11 Houston Rockets season was the 44th season of the franchise in the National Basketball Association (NBA), and the 40th based in Houston. This season was Yao Ming's last in the NBA. He played only 5 games because of recurring injuries that interrupted his career. Despite his injuries, he was selected to play in the 2011 NBA All-Star Game as a starter, but he was unable to participate.

The Rockets ended the season with a 43–39 record without the playoffs. After the season, head coach Rick Adelman left to coach the Minnesota Timberwolves and Yao retired.

== Key dates ==
- June 24 – The 2010 NBA draft was held in New York City.
- July 1 – The free agency period begun.

== Draft picks ==
Round	Pick	Player	Position	Nationality	College/Team
1	14	Patrick Patterson	PF	United States	Kentucky

== Roster ==
2010-11 Houston Rockets roster
Players

Pos.	No.	Player	Height	Weight	DOB	From
G/F	15	Marqus Blakely	6 ft 5 in (1.96 m)	230 lb (104 kg)		Vermont
F	10	Chase Budinger	6 ft 7 in (2.01 m)	209 lb (95 kg)		Arizona
C	50	Marcus Cousin	6 ft 11 in (2.11 m)	255 lb (116 kg)		Houston
G	3	Goran Dragić	6 ft 3 in (1.91 m)	190 lb (86 kg)		Slovenia
F/C	44	Chuck Hayes	6 ft 6 in (1.98 m)	238 lb (108 kg)		Kentucky
F/C	27	Jordan Hill	6 ft 10 in (2.08 m)	235 lb (107 kg)		Arizona
G	5	Courtney Lee	6 ft 5 in (1.96 m)	200 lb (91 kg)		Western Kentucky
PG	7	Kyle Lowry	6 ft 0 in (1.83 m)	205 lb (93 kg)		Villanova
G	12	Kevin Martin	6 ft 7 in (2.01 m)	199 lb (90 kg)		Western Carolina
F/C	52	Brad Miller	6 ft 11 in (2.11 m)	244 lb (111 kg)		Purdue
F	54	Patrick Patterson	6 ft 9 in (2.06 m)	235 lb (107 kg)		Kentucky
F/C	4	Luis Scola	6 ft 9 in (2.06 m)	245 lb (111 kg)		Argentina
C	32	Hasheem Thabeet	7 ft 3 in (2.21 m)	263 lb (119 kg)		Connecticut
G/F	1	Terrence Williams	6 ft 6 in (1.98 m)	220 lb (100 kg)		Louisville
C	11	Yao Ming (injured)	7 ft 6 in (2.29 m)	310 lb (141 kg)		People's Republic of China

Coaches
Head coach
- Rick Adelman (Loyola Marymount)
Assistant(s)
- Elston Turner (Mississippi)
- Jack Sikma (Illinois Wesleyan)
- T. R. Dunn (Alabama)
- R.J. Adelman (Willamette)
- Pat Zipfel (Cabrini College)

Legend
- (DP) Unsigned draft pick
- (FA) Free agent
- (S) Suspended
- Injured

Roster

== Pre-season ==
=== Game log ===
2010 pre-season game log
Pre-season: 4–4 (home: 3–2; road: 1–2)

Game	Date	Team	Score	High points	High rebounds	High assists	Location Attendance	Record
1	October 5	Orlando	L 88–97	Kevin Martin (14)	Luis Scola (6)	Shane Battier, Aaron Brooks, Jared Jeffries, Kyle Lowry, Courtney Lee, Ishmael Smith (2)	State Farm Arena; 4,854	0–1
2	October 7	San Antonio	W 90–87	Kevin Martin (21)	Chuck Hayes (10)	Kyle Lowry (7)	Toyota Center; 13,035	1–1
3	October 9	Indiana	W 126–92	Luis Scola (23)	Luis Scola (11)	Ishmael Smith (8)	Toyota Center; 12,469	2–1
4	October 10	Cleveland	L 93–99	Chase Budinger (13)	Chase Budinger (10)	Chuck Hayes, Antonio Anderson, Ishmael Smith, Patrick Patterson (2)	Toyota Center; 11,095	2–2
5	October 13	New Jersey	W 91–81	Kevin Martin (18)	Patrick Patterson (9)	Chase Budinger (4)	Wukesong Arena; 16,996	3–2
6	October 16	@ New Jersey	W 95–85	Kevin Martin (16)	Shane Battier, Courtney Lee (6)	Brad Miller, Kyle Lowry (4)	Guangzhou Gymnasium; 16,516	4–2
7	October 21	@ San Antonio	L 103–111	Kevin Martin (21)	Luis Scola (7)	Aaron Brooks (5)	AT&T Center; 15,356	4–3
8	October 22	@ Dallas	L 96–97	Chase Budinger (19)	Luis Scola, Yao Ming (8)	Aaron Brooks, Ishmael Smith (4)	American Airlines Center; 18,580	4–4

2010–11 season schedule

== Regular season ==
=== Standings ===
Southwest Division	W	L	PCT	GB	Home	Road	Div
c-San Antonio Spurs	61	21	.744	–	36–5	25–16	10–6
x-Dallas Mavericks	57	25	.695	4	29–12	28–13	8–8
x-New Orleans Hornets	46	36	.561	15	28–13	18–23	9–7
x-Memphis Grizzlies	46	36	.561	15	30–11	16–25	8–8
Houston Rockets	43	39	.524	18	25–16	18–23	5–11

#	Western Conference				
#	Team	W	L	PCT	GB
1	c-San Antonio Spurs	61	21	.744	–
2	y-Los Angeles Lakers	57	25	.695	4
3	x-Dallas Mavericks	57	25	.695	4
4	y-Oklahoma City Thunder	55	27	.671	6
5	x-Denver Nuggets	50	32	.610	11
6	x-Portland Trail Blazers	48	34	.585	13
7	x-New Orleans Hornets	46	36	.561	15
8	x-Memphis Grizzlies	46	36	.561	15
9	Houston Rockets	43	39	.524	18
10	Phoenix Suns	40	42	.488	21
11	Utah Jazz	39	43	.476	22
12	Golden State Warriors	36	46	.439	25
13	Los Angeles Clippers	32	50	.390	29
14	Sacramento Kings	24	58	.293	37
15	Minnesota Timberwolves	17	65	.207	44

=== Game log ===
2010–11 game log
Total: 43–39 (Home: 25–16; Road: 18–23)
October: 0–3 (home: 0–1; road: 0–2)

Game	Date	Team	Score	High points	High rebounds	High assists	Location Attendance	Record
1	October 26	@ L.A. Lakers	L 110–112	Kevin Martin (26)	Luis Scola (16)	Aaron Brooks (9)	Staples Center; 18,997	0–1
2	October 27	@ Golden State	L 128–132	Luis Scola (36)	Luis Scola (16)	Aaron Brooks (7)	Oracle Arena; 18,428	0–2
3	October 30	Denver	L 94–107	Luis Scola (28)	Luis Scola (10)	Aaron Brooks (5)	Toyota Center; 18,161	0–3

November: 5–9 (home: 3–3; road: 2–6)

Game	Date	Team	Score	High points	High rebounds	High assists	Location Attendance	Record
4	November 3	New Orleans	L 99–107	Aaron Brooks, Kevin Martin (18)	Luis Scola (16)	Luis Scola (5)	Toyota Center; 13,484	0–4
5	November 6	@ San Antonio	L 121–124 (OT)	Kevin Martin (24)	Chuck Hayes (13)	Ishmael Smith (7)	AT&T Center; 17,740	0–5
6	November 7	Minnesota	W 120–94	Luis Scola (24)	Luis Scola (8)	Ishmael Smith (6)	Toyota Center; 15,058	1–5
7	November 10	@ Washington	L 91–98	Kevin Martin (31)	Chuck Hayes, Kevin Martin (7)	Kevin Martin (6)	Verizon Center; 13,665	1–6
8	November 12	@ Indiana	W 102–99	Brad Miller (23)	Luis Scola (9)	Kyle Lowry (7)	Conseco Fieldhouse; 14,414	2–6
9	November 14	@ New York	W 104–96	Kevin Martin (28)	Chuck Hayes (9)	Kyle Lowry (6)	Madison Square Garden; 19,763	3–6
10	November 16	Chicago	L 92–95	Luis Scola (27)	Chuck Hayes, Jordan Hill, Brad Miller, Luis Scola (5)	Kyle Lowry (7)	Toyota Center; 18,158	3–7
11	November 17	@ Oklahoma City	L 99–116	Luis Scola (26)	Luis Scola (8)	Ishmael Smith (5)	Oklahoma City Arena; 17,509	3–8
12	November 19	@ Toronto	L 96–106	Kevin Martin (31)	Kyle Lowry (7)	Kyle Lowry (12)	Air Canada Centre; 17,369	3–9
13	November 22	Phoenix	L 116–123	Kevin Martin (19)	Jordan Hill (10)	Kyle Lowry (8)	Toyota Center; 15,080	3–10
14	November 24	Golden State	W 111–101	Kevin Martin (25)	Luis Scola (12)	Kyle Lowry (10)	Toyota Center; 13,847	4–10
15	November 26	@ Charlotte	L 89–99	Chase Budinger (19)	Chuck Hayes (10)	Kyle Lowry (6)	Time Warner Cable Arena; 16,473	4–11
16	November 28	Oklahoma City	W 99–98	Kevin Martin (23)	Jordan Hill, Brad Miller (7)	Kyle Lowry (8)	Toyota Center; 15,316	5–11
17	November 29	@ Dallas	L 91–101	Kevin Martin (17)	Jordan Hill (8)	Kyle Lowry, Brad Miller (5)	American Airlines Center; 19,435	5–12

December: 11–4 (home: 8–1; road: 3–3)

Game	Date	Team	Score	High points	High rebounds	High assists	Location Attendance	Record
18	December 1	L.A. Lakers	W 109–99	Kevin Martin (22)	Luis Scola (9)	Kyle Lowry (10)	Toyota Center; 18,116	6–12
19	December 3	@ Memphis	W 127–111	Kyle Lowry, Kevin Martin (28)	Brad Miller (7)	Kyle Lowry (12)	FedExForum; 14,577	7–12
20	December 4	@ Chicago	L 116–119 (OT)	Luis Scola (27)	Luis Scola (8)	Kyle Lowry, Kevin Martin (4)	United Center; 21,232	7–13
21	December 7	Detroit	W 97–83	Luis Scola (35)	Luis Scola (12)	Kyle Lowry (12)	Toyota Center; 14,798	8–13
22	December 10	@ Milwaukee	L 91–97	Kevin Martin (23)	Brad Miller, Luis Scola (6)	Brad Miller (4)	Bradley Center; 14,526	8–14
23	December 11	Cleveland	W 110–95	Kevin Martin (40)	Luis Scola (14)	Kyle Lowry (6)	Toyota Center; 15,532	9–14
24	December 14	Sacramento	W 118–105	Luis Scola (23)	Luis Scola (10)	Kyle Lowry (9)	Toyota Center; 13,414	10–14
25	December 15	@ Oklahoma City	L 105–117	Kevin Martin (22)	Jordan Hill, Luis Scola (5)	Shane Battier (5)	Oklahoma City Arena; 17,997	10–15
26	December 17	Memphis	W 103–87	Kevin Martin (34)	Shane Battier (10)	Kyle Lowry (18)	Toyota Center; 14,534	11–15
27	December 19	@ Sacramento	W 102–93	Kevin Martin (22)	Chuck Hayes (11)	Kyle Lowry (7)	ARCO Arena; 13,599	12–15
28	December 20	@ Golden State	W 121–112	Kevin Martin (30)	Chuck Hayes (10)	Kyle Lowry (8)	Oracle Arena; 19,256	13–15
29	December 22	@ L.A. Clippers	W 97–92	Kevin Martin (28)	Shane Battier (10)	Shane Battier (7)	Staples Center; 17,470	14–15
30	December 27	Washington	W 100–93	Kevin Martin (20)	Chuck Hayes (8)	Kyle Lowry (6)	Toyota Center; 18,143	15–15
31	December 29	Miami	L 119–125	Luis Scola (22)	Chuck Hayes (8)	Aaron Brooks (8)	Toyota Center; 18,409	15–16
32	December 31	Toronto	W 114–105	Chase Budinger (22)	Patrick Patterson (10)	Aaron Brooks (7)	Toyota Center; 18,121	16–16

January: 6–11 (home: 3–5; road: 3–6)

Game	Date	Team	Score	High points	High rebounds	High assists	Location Attendance	Record
33	January 2	@ Portland	L 85–100	Kevin Martin (15)	Patrick Patterson (10)	Kyle Lowry, Kevin Martin (4)	Rose Garden; 20,416	16–17
34	January 3	@ Denver	L 106–113	Luis Scola (24)	Brad Miller (11)	Aaron Brooks, Brad Miller (5)	Pepsi Center; 17,136	16–18
35	January 5	Portland	L 100–103	Kevin Martin (45)	Luis Scola (12)	Kyle Lowry (7)	Toyota Center; 14,125	16–19
36	January 7	@ Orlando	L 95–110	Kevin Martin (27)	Courtney Lee (6)	Kyle Lowry (5)	Amway Center; 19,107	16–20
37	January 8	Utah	L 99–103 (OT)	Luis Scola (24)	Luis Scola (10)	Kyle Lowry (6)	Toyota Center; 16,113	16–21
38	January 10	@ Boston	W 108–102	Aaron Brooks (24)	Luis Scola (9)	Kyle Lowry (8)	TD Garden; 18,624	17–21
39	January 12	Oklahoma City	L 112–118	Luis Scola (31)	Luis Scola (11)	Shane Battier (6)	Toyota Center; 16,158	17–22
40	January 14	New Orleans	L 105–110 (OT)	Kyle Lowry (28)	Luis Scola (11)	Kyle Lowry (7)	Toyota Center; 13,616	17–23
41	January 15	@ Atlanta	W 112–106	Aaron Brooks (24)	Chuck Hayes, Jordan Hill (8)	Aaron Brooks (10)	Philips Arena; 13,420	18–23
42	January 17	Milwaukee	W 93–84	Kevin Martin (36)	Luis Scola (14)	Kyle Lowry (6)	Toyota Center; 16,186	19–23
43	January 19	New York	W 104–89	Kevin Martin (21)	Chuck Hayes (12)	Chuck Hayes, Kyle Lowry, Kevin Martin (4)	Toyota Center; 15,903	20–23
44	January 21	@ Memphis	L 110–115	Kevin Martin (32)	Shane Battier (8)	Kyle Lowry (8)	FedExForum; 13,458	20–24
45	January 22	Orlando	L 104–118	Chase Budinger (19)	Luis Scola (9)	Chuck Hayes (4)	Toyota Center; 18,052	20–25
46	January 24	@ Minnesota	W 129–125	Kevin Martin (34)	Luis Scola (12)	Chuck Hayes (7)	Target Center; 11,983	21–25
47	January 26	L.A. Clippers	W 96–83	Kyle Lowry (20)	Chuck Hayes (11)	Kyle Lowry (8)	Toyota Center; 18,147	22–25
48	January 27	@ Dallas	L 106–111	Luis Scola (30)	Chuck Hayes, Luis Scola (8)	Kyle Lowry (5)	American Airlines Center; 20,088	22–26
49	January 29	@ San Antonio	L 95–108	Luis Scola (23)	Luis Scola (10)	Kyle Lowry (7)	AT&T Center; 18,581	22–27

February: 8–4 (home: 3–3; road: 5–1)

Game	Date	Team	Score	High points	High rebounds	High assists	Location Attendance	Record
50	February 1	@ L.A. Lakers	L 106–114 (OT)	Kevin Martin (30)	Luis Scola (15)	Aaron Brooks (8)	Staples Center; 18,997	22–28
51	February 2	@ Utah	W 97–96	Kevin Martin (22)	Chuck Hayes (12)	Kyle Lowry (5)	EnergySolutions Arena; 19,619	23–28
52	February 5	Memphis	W 95–93 (OT)	Kevin Martin (31)	Shane Battier (13)	Kyle Lowry (6)	Toyota Center; 18,195	24–28
53	February 7	@ Denver	W 108–103	Kevin Martin (37)	Chuck Hayes (10)	Kevin Martin (7)	Pepsi Center; 14,595	25–28
54	February 8	Minnesota	L 108–112	Courtney Lee, Kevin Martin (23)	Chuck Hayes (13)	Luis Scola (7)	Toyota Center; 15,679	25–29
55	February 12	Dallas	L 102–106	Kyle Lowry (26)	Jordan Hill (9)	Kyle Lowry (8)	Toyota Center; 17,009	25–30
56	February 14	Denver	W 121–102	Courtney Lee (22)	Luis Scola (8)	Kyle Lowry (7)	Toyota Center; 16,450	26–30
57	February 16	Philadelphia	L 105–114	Kyle Lowry (36)	Luis Scola (13)	Kyle Lowry (7)	Toyota Center; 14,476	26–31
All-Star Break
58	February 22	@ Detroit	W 108–100	Patrick Patterson (20)	Luis Scola (9)	Aaron Brooks (6)	The Palace of Auburn Hills; 12,353	27–31
59	February 23	@ Cleveland	W 124–119	Chase Budinger, Kevin Martin (30)	Chuck Hayes (17)	Brad Miller (5)	Quicken Loans Arena; 18,027	28–31
60	February 26	New Jersey	W 123–108	Kevin Martin (30)	Chuck Hayes (11)	Kyle Lowry (9)	Toyota Center; 17,209	29–31
61	February 27	@ New Orleans	W 91–89	Kevin Martin (33)	Chuck Hayes (11)	Chuck Hayes (5)	New Orleans Arena; 17,466	30–31

March: 9–5 (home: 6–1; road: 3–4)

Game	Date	Team	Score	High points	High rebounds	High assists	Location Attendance	Record
62	March 1	@ Portland	W 103–87	Kyle Lowry, Luis Scola (21)	Chuck Hayes (7)	Kyle Lowry (11)	Rose Garden; 20,272	31–31
63	March 2	@ L.A. Clippers	L 103–106	Kyle Lowry (24)	Chuck Hayes (12)	Kyle Lowry (11)	Staples Center; 19,060	31–32
64	March 5	Indiana	W 112–95	Kevin Martin (20)	Chuck Hayes (10)	Kyle Lowry (6)	Toyota Center; 14,965	32–32
65	March 7	@ Sacramento	W 123–101	Chase Budinger (20)	Kyle Lowry (7)	Kyle Lowry (8)	Power Balance Pavilion; 12,561	33–32
66	March 8	@ Phoenix	L 110–113	Kyle Lowry (32)	Chuck Hayes, Brad Miller (9)	Kyle Lowry, Kevin Martin, Brad Miller (4)	US Airways Center; 17,363	33–33
67	March 12	San Antonio	L 107–115	Kevin Martin (28)	Chuck Hayes (11)	Kyle Lowry (9)	Toyota Center; 18,245	33–34
68	March 14	Phoenix	W 95–93	Kevin Martin (23)	Chuck Hayes (9)	Kyle Lowry (5)	Toyota Center; 16,262	34–34
69	March 16	Charlotte	W 94–78	Kevin Martin (21)	Chuck Hayes (17)	Chuck Hayes (7)	Toyota Center; 14,822	35–34
70	March 18	Boston	W 93–77	Kevin Martin (25)	Patrick Patterson (12)	Kyle Lowry (9)	Toyota Center; 18,412	36–34
71	March 20	Utah	W 110–108	Kevin Martin (34)	Patrick Patterson (13)	Kyle Lowry (10)	Toyota Center; 14,459	37–34
72	March 23	Golden State	W 131–112	Kevin Martin (34)	Chuck Hayes (14)	Kyle Lowry (12)	Toyota Center; 16,623	38–34
73	March 27	@ Miami	L 119–125	Kevin Martin (29)	Chuck Hayes, Kyle Lowry (7)	Kyle Lowry (9)	American Airlines Arena; 19,825	38–35
74	March 29	@ New Jersey	W 112–87	Kevin Martin (20)	Chuck Hayes (14)	Kyle Lowry (10)	Prudential Center; 13,866	39–35
75	March 30	@ Philadelphia	L 97–108	Kyle Lowry (19)	Chase Budinger (9)	Chuck Hayes (7)	Wells Fargo Center; 16,635	39–36

April: 4–3 (home: 3–2; road: 1–1)

Game	Date	Team	Score	High points	High rebounds	High assists	Location Attendance	Record
76	April 1	San Antonio	W 119–114 (OT)	Kevin Martin (33)	Luis Scola (14)	Luis Scola (6)	Toyota Center; 18,059	40–36
77	April 3	Atlanta	W 114–109	Kevin Martin (35)	Chuck Hayes (12)	Kyle Lowry (8)	Toyota Center; 15,993	41–36
78	April 5	Sacramento	L 101–104	Kevin Martin (30)	Chuck Hayes, Luis Scola (10)	Kyle Lowry (9)	Toyota Center; 15,523	41–37
79	April 6	@ New Orleans	L 93–101	Kevin Martin (21)	Chuck Hayes, Luis Scola (10)	Courtney Lee, Kyle Lowry (6)	New Orleans Arena; 12,728	41–38
80	April 9	L.A. Clippers	W 99–78	Chase Budinger, Kevin Martin, Brad Miller (16)	Chuck Hayes (13)	Goran Dragić (7)	Toyota Center; 18,089	42–38
81	April 11	Dallas	L 91–98 (OT)	Kevin Martin (28)	Chuck Hayes (12)	Goran Dragić (7)	Toyota Center; 14,898	42–39
82	April 13	@ Minnesota	W 121–102	Chase Budinger (35)	Goran Dragić (11)	Goran Dragić (11)	Target Center; 17,101	43–39

2010–11 season schedule

== Player statistics ==
Legend
GP	Games played	GS	Games started	MPG	Minutes per game
FG%	Field-goal percentage	3P%	3-point field-goal percentage	FT%	Free-throw percentage
RPG	Rebounds per game	APG	Assists per game	SPG	Steals per game
BPG	Blocks per game	PPG	Points per game

=== Season ===
Houston Rockets statistics
Player	GP	GS	MPG	FG%	3P%	FT%	RPG	APG	SPG	BPG	PPG
Shane Battier*	59	59	30.8	.456	.391	.645	4.8	2.6	.90	1.20	8.6
Aaron Brooks*	34	7	23.9	.346	.284	.940	1.5	3.8	.60	.10	11.6
Chase Budinger	71	15	21.3	.421	.335	.852	3.5	1.5	.54	.21	9.4
DeMarre Carroll*	4	0	2.0	.000	.0	.0	0.0	0.5	.0	.0	0.0
Goran Dragić*	15	0	13.2	.486	.552	.724	1.5	1.8	.60	.07	7.1
Mike Harris	3	0	2.0	.667	.0	.0	0.0	0.0	.0	.0	1.3
Chuck Hayes	67	56	27.2	.527	.000	.664	7.8	2.6	1.00	.67	7.7
Jordan Hill	67	11	16.2	.490	.000	.720	4.4	0.4	.21	.73	5.8
Jared Jeffries*	18	0	7.7	.306	.167	.400	1.9	0.6	.40	.20	1.5
Courtney Lee	74	1	20.6	.452	.426	.755	2.4	1.1	.70	.20	8.1
Kyle Lowry	71	67	33.8	.433	.380	.755	4.1	6.6	1.39	.31	13.5
Kevin Martin	73	73	31.9	.436	.390	.893	3.2	2.4	1.04	.19	23.1
Brad Miller	56	5	16.5	.438	.358	.822	3.5	2.3	.45	.36	6.1
Patrick Patterson	45	3	15.9	.557	.000	.727	3.9	0.8	.33	.71	6.0
Luis Scola	70	70	32.5	.501	.000	.736	8.1	2.4	.63	.63	18.3
Ishmael Smith*	28	3	11.8	.386	.375	.700	1.5	2.3	.50	.10	2.6
Jermaine Taylor*	8	0	9.6	.500	.400	.833	1.1	0.3	.30	.30	4.9
Hasheem Thabeet*	2	0	2.0	.000	.0	.0	0.0	0.0	.0	.50	0.0
Terrence Williams*	11	0	7.6	.333	.200	.818	1.4	0.6	.36	.0	3.5
Yao Ming	5	5	18.2	.486	.273	.938	5.4	0.8	.0	1.60	10.2

As of March 31.
* – Stats with the Rockets.

== Awards, records and milestones ==
=== Awards ===
==== Week/Month ====
- Kevin Martin was named Western Conference Player of the Week for games played February 21 through February 27.
- Kyle Lowry was named Western Conference Player of the Week for games played March 14 through March 20.

==== All-Star ====
- Yao Ming was selected by fans as the starting center for the 2011 NBA All-Star Game. He was unable to play due to injury. Kevin Love of the Minnesota Timberwolves was selected as his replacement, and Tim Duncan of the San Antonio Spurs was selected to start in his place.

== Transactions ==
=== Trades ===
December 15, 2010

To New Jersey Nets----
- (Slovenia) Sasha Vujačić
- 2011 first-round pick
- 2012 first-round pick
To Houston Rockets----
- (United States) Terrence Williams
To Los Angeles Lakers----
- (United States) Joe Smith
December 15, 2010

To Sacramento Kings----
- (United States) Jermaine Taylor
- Cash considerations
To Houston Rockets----
- Future second-round pick
February 24, 2011

To Memphis Grizzlies----
- (United States) Shane Battier
- (United States) Ishmael Smith
To Houston Rockets----
- (Tanzania) Hasheem Thabeet
- (United States) DeMarre Carroll
- Future first-round pick
February 24, 2011

To Phoenix Suns----
- (United States) Aaron Brooks
To Houston Rockets----
- (Slovenia) Goran Dragić
- 2011 protected first-round pick

=== Free agents ===
==== Additions ====
Player	Signed	Former Team
Brad Miller	Signed 3-year contract for $15 Million	Chicago Bulls
Kyle Lowry		Houston Rockets
Chuck Hayes		Houston Rockets
Luis Scola	Signed 5-year contract for $47 Million	Houston Rockets
Yao Ming		Houston Rockets

==== Subtractions ====
Player	Reason Left	New Team
Brian Cook	Free agent	Los Angeles Clippers
Hilton Armstrong	Free agent	Washington Wizards
Jared Jeffries	Waived	
