= Chase Budinger =

American volleyball and basketball player (born 1988)

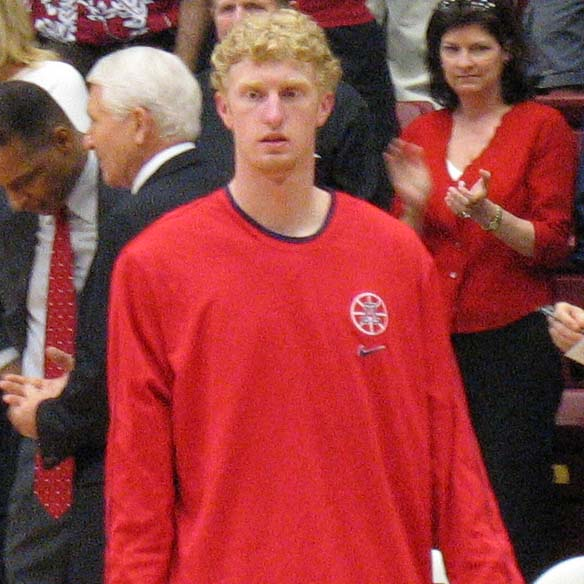
- Budinger with the Arizona Wildcats

Personal information
- Born: May 22, 1988 (age 38) Encinitas, California, U.S.
- Listed height: 6 ft 7 in (2.01 m)
- Listed weight: 209 lb (95 kg)

Career information
- High school: La Costa Canyon (Carlsbad, California)
- College: Arizona (2006–2009)
- NBA draft: 2009: 2nd round, 44th overall pick
- Drafted by: Detroit Pistons
- Playing career: 2009–2017
- Position: Small forward
- Number: 10, 34

Career history
- 2009–2012: Houston Rockets
- 2012–2015: Minnesota Timberwolves
- 2015–2016: Indiana Pacers
- 2016: Phoenix Suns
- 2016–2017: Saski Baskonia

Career highlights
- First-team All-Pac-10 (2009); Third-team All-Pac-10 (2008); Pac-10 Freshman of the Year (2007); McDonald's All-American Game Co-MVP (2006); First-team Parade All-American (2006); California Mr. Basketball (2006)
- Stats at NBA.com
- Stats at Basketball Reference
Medals
Men's beach volleyball
Representing the United States
World Tour
Gold medal – first place	2023 Haikou	Beach
Silver medal – second place	2021 Rubavu	Beach
Silver medal – second place	2022 Nalaguraidhoo	Beach
Silver medal – second place	2023 Saquarema	Beach
Silver medal – second place	2025 Veracruz	Beach
Silver medal – second place	2026 Gstaad	Beach
Bronze medal – third place	2023 Chiang Mai	Beach

Chase Andrew Budinger (/ˈbʌdɪŋɡər/ BUH-ding-ghər; born May 22, 1988) is an American beach volleyball player and former professional basketball player. He was selected by the Detroit Pistons with the 44th overall pick in the 2009 NBA draft after playing three years of college basketball for the Arizona Wildcats.

== Basketball career ==
=== High school career ===
Budinger was a standout basketball and volleyball player at La Costa Canyon High School while living in Encinitas, California; his teammates on the basketball team included future NFL quarterback Kevin O'Connell and future Wagner College Point Guard, Caleb Stratton. In basketball, he led La Costa Canyon to the CIF San Diego Section title in 2006. In volleyball, he led his school to three state championships and was named by Volleyball Magazine as the National Player of the Year as a senior.

Budinger was a McDonald's All-American and was the runner-up in the 2006 McDonald's All-American Slam Dunk Contest.

Considered a five-star recruit by Rivals.com, Budinger was listed as the No. 2 small forward and the No. 4 player in the nation in 2006. Budinger was named Co-MVP of the 2006 McDonald's All-American Game along with future NBA superstar Kevin Durant.

=== College career ===
Budinger chose to concentrate on basketball, signing with Arizona—a school that did not (and still does not) sponsor varsity men's volleyball—although he received offers from many other schools, most notably offers by USC and UCLA to play both basketball and volleyball. He averaged 15.6 points in his freshman season, starting all 30 games for the Wildcats. At the conclusion of the season he announced that he planned to stay with Arizona for his sophomore season, despite speculation that he could be picked early in the NBA draft. However, he later announced that he would declare for the draft and not hire an agent. He was projected as a mid-first-round pick by most draft analysts. However, on the final day of the deadline for pulling out of the early entry list, Budinger opted not to remain in the draft and returned to school instead.

After the 2008–09 season, he declared for the NBA draft a second time. Under an NCAA rule back then, declaring for the draft a second time ended a player's college eligibility. In 2016, that rule was revised to allow a player to enter and withdraw from the draft multiple times without losing eligibility.

=== Professional career ===
==== Houston Rockets (2009–2012) ====
In 2009, he was drafted by the Detroit Pistons, and then traded to the Houston Rockets on draft night. He joined the Rockets' Summer League team, and averaged 17.8 PPG. In the 2009 season opener for the Rockets, Budinger came off the bench and logged 15 minutes of playing time while scoring 6 points and collecting one rebound. On March 30, 2010, Budinger scored 24 points in a 98–94 home win against the Washington Wizards. Three days later he matched this total in a 119–114 road win at the Boston Celtics. On February 23, 2011, Budinger scored a new career-high 30 points in a 124–119 win over the Cleveland Cavaliers. During the Rockets' season finale against the Minnesota Timberwolves, Budinger scored a new career-high 35 points on 12 of 21 shooting, including 4 for 8 from 3-point range.

During the 2011 NBA lockout, Budinger agreed to play for the Russian team PBC Lokomotiv-Kuban; however, before he signed the deal, the lockout ended and the agreement fell through.

In 2012, Budinger competed in the 2012 Slam Dunk Contest, where he performed a dunk over P. Diddy, a wheelhouse slam, and a blindfolded reverse dunk honoring former Slam Dunk Contest winner Cedric Ceballos. However, he ultimately lost to Jeremy Evans by one percent of the votes.

==== Minnesota Timberwolves (2012–2015) ====
On June 25, 2012, Budinger, along with the rights to Lior Eliyahu, was traded to the Minnesota Timberwolves for the eighteenth pick in the 2012 NBA draft. On November 2, he made his debut for the Timberwolves in a 92–80 win over the Sacramento Kings, recording nine points, five rebounds and one block in 21 minutes off the bench.

==== Indiana Pacers (2015–2016) ====
On July 12, 2015, Budinger was traded to the Indiana Pacers in exchange for Damjan Rudež. On October 28, he made his debut for Indiana in a 106–99 loss to the Toronto Raptors, recording two rebounds and one assist in 15 minutes off the bench. On March 5, 2016, he was waived by the Pacers.

==== Phoenix Suns (2016) ====
On March 8, 2016, Budinger signed with the Phoenix Suns. He made his debut for the Suns the following night, recording two points, two rebounds and one assist in a loss to the New York Knicks.

On September 26, 2016, Budinger signed with the Brooklyn Nets, but was waived on October 18 after appearing in four preseason games.

==== Saski Baskonia (2016–2017) ====
On October 27, 2016, Budinger signed with Saski Baskonia. Over 29 EuroLeague games, he averaged 6.8 points and 3.8 rebounds per game.

== Beach volleyball career ==
In 2017, Budinger decided to retire from basketball to focus on playing professional beach volleyball. He made his debut on the AVP tour with Sean Rosenthal in 2018, and in 2019 he partnered with Casey Patterson. On June 5, 2024, Budinger, along with partner Miles Evans, qualified for the 2024 Summer Olympic Games in Paris, France. The pair finished in 9th place in the Paris Olympics and were eliminated by Norway's Christian Sorum/ Anders Mol who went on to win the bronze medal. Budinger became the first person to play a regular-season game in the NBA and compete in an Olympic beach volleyball match.

== Personal life ==
Budinger holds dual American/Latvian citizenship.

Budinger's parents are Duncan and Māra Budinger. His maternal grandfather, Andrejs Eglītis, was Latvian, and fled to the United States shortly after the Soviet occupation of the country. Andrejs was proud of his ethnicity and wrote a book about it called A Man From Latvia. Budinger's older sister, Brittanie, played volleyball at the University of San Francisco and as a professional in Europe. His older brother, Duncan, also plays volleyball and tours professionally.

== Career statistics ==
Legend
GP	Games played	GS	Games started	MPG	Minutes per game
FG%	Field goal percentage	3P%	3-point field goal percentage	FT%	Free throw percentage
RPG	Rebounds per game	APG	Assists per game	SPG	Steals per game
BPG	Blocks per game	PPG	Points per game	**Bold**	Career high

=== NBA ===
==== Regular season ====
Year	Team	GP	GS	MPG	FG%	3P%	FT%	RPG	APG	SPG	BPG	PPG
2009–10	Houston	74	4	20.1	.441	.369	.770	3.0	1.2	.5	.2	8.9
2010–11	Houston	**78**	**22**	22.3	.425	.325	**.855**	3.6	**1.6**	.5	.2	**9.8**
2011–12	Houston	58	9	**22.4**	.442	**.402**	.771	**3.7**	1.3	.5	.1	9.6
2012–13	Minnesota	23	1	22.1	.414	.321	.762	3.1	1.1	.6	**.3**	9.4
2013–14	Minnesota	41	8	18.3	.394	.350	.821	2.5	.8	.5	.0	6.7
2014–15	Minnesota	67	4	19.2	.433	.364	.827	3.0	1.0	**.7**	.1	6.8
2015–16	Indiana	49	2	14.9	.418	.290	.708	2.5	1.0	.6	.2	4.4
2015–16	Phoenix	17	0	11.8	**.511**	.235	.625	1.7	.9	.2	.1	3.2
Career		407	50	19.7	.430	.352	.797	3.0	1.2	.5	.2	7.9

=== EuroLeague ===
Year	Team	GP	GS	MPG	FG%	3P%	FT%	RPG	APG	SPG	BPG	PPG	PIR
2016–17	Saski Baskonia	29	16	18.5	.584	.328	.852	3.8	1.2	.6	.1	6.8	7.8
Career		29	16	18.5	.584	.328	.852	3.8	1.2	.6	.1	6.8	7.8

=== College ===
Year	Team	GP	GS	MPG	FG%	3P%	FT%	RPG	APG	SPG	BPG	PPG
2006–07	Arizona	31	31	33.0	**.485**	.368	**.845**	5.8	2.0	1.2	0.4	15.6
2007–08	Arizona	34	34	35.3	.446	.380	.718	5.4	2.9	1.1	0.2	17.1
2008–09	Arizona	**35**	**35**	**37.6**	.480	**.399**	.801	**6.2**	**3.4**	**1.4**	**0.5**	**18.0**
**Career**		100	100	35.4	.469	.383	.782	5.8	2.8	1.3	0.4	17.0

== Awards ==
- 2006 Mizuno National Player of the Year in high school boys' volleyball
- Co-MVP of the 2006 McDonald's High School All-American Game (with Kevin Durant)
- 2006 First-team Parade All-American
- Named the Most Valuable Player of the Nike Junior World Championships in Douai, France
- Named the Most Valuable Player of the 2006 US Junior Olympic Volleyball Tournament in the 18 and under division.
- 2006 California Mr. Basketball
- 2006 McDonald's All-American Slam Dunk Contest Runner-Up
- Named the 2007 Pac-10 Freshman of the Year

== See also ==
- 2006 high school boys basketball All-Americans
