= Jordan Hill (basketball) =

American basketball player (born 1987)

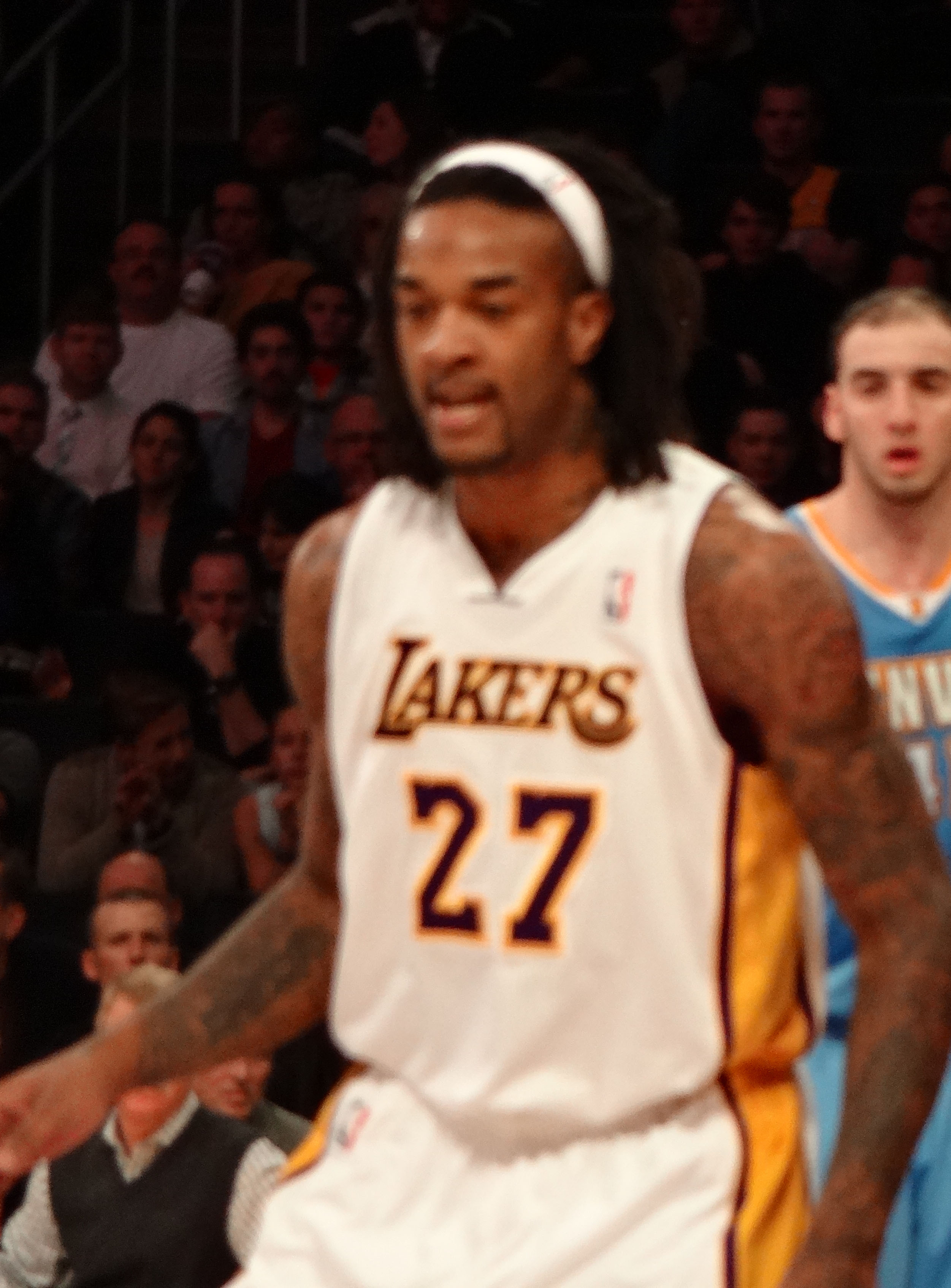
- Hill with the Los Angeles Lakers in 2013

Personal information
- Born: July 27, 1987 (age 38) Newberry, South Carolina, U.S.
- Listed height: 6 ft 10 in (2.08 m)
- Listed weight: 240 lb (109 kg)

Career information
- High school: North Springs (Atlanta, Georgia); The Patterson School (Lenoir, North Carolina)
- College: Arizona (2006–2009)
- NBA draft: 2009: 1st round, 8th overall pick
- Drafted by: New York Knicks
- Playing career: 2009–2018
- Position: Center / power forward
- Number: 43, 27

Career history
- 2009–2010: New York Knicks
- 2010–2012: Houston Rockets
- 2012–2015: Los Angeles Lakers
- 2015–2016: Indiana Pacers
- 2016–2017: Minnesota Timberwolves
- 2017: Nevada Desert Dogs
- 2018: Vancouver Knights

Career highlights
- Third-team All-American – SN (2009); First-team All-Pac-10 (2009)
- Stats at NBA.com
- Stats at Basketball Reference

Jordan Craig Hill (born July 27, 1987) is an American former professional basketball player.

Hill played college basketball for the Arizona Wildcats before he was drafted eighth overall in the 2009 NBA draft by the New York Knicks. He was traded in the middle of his rookie season to the Houston Rockets, and was again involved in a midseason trade to the Los Angeles Lakers in 2011–12. In 2015, he signed with the Indiana Pacers, but departed after just one season, signing with the Timberwolves in 2016.

== Early life and college ==
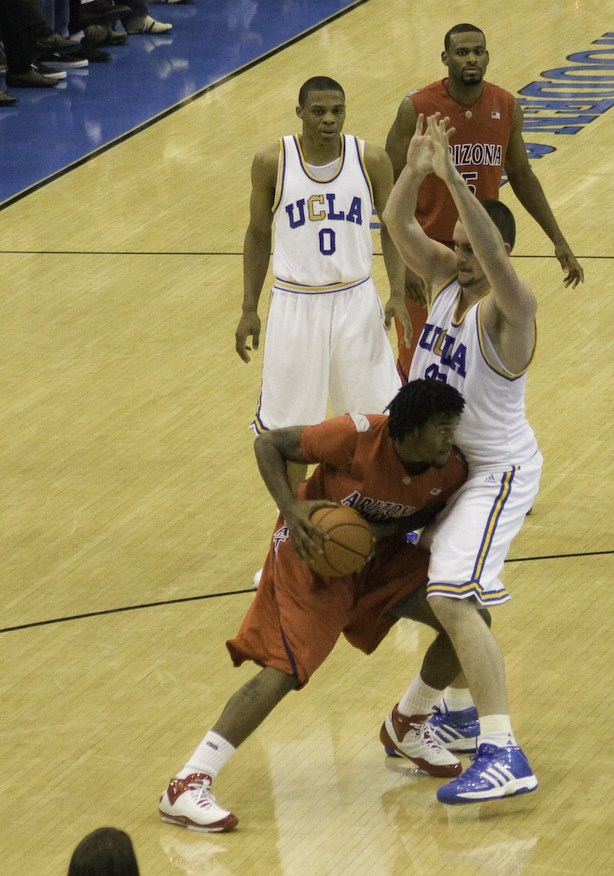
Kevin Love of UCLA defends Hill, then with Arizona.

Jordan Hill was born in Newberry, South Carolina. After Hill's mother died of breast cancer when Hill was three, Hill was raised by his father and grandmother and later older brother and older sister. His cousin, Trevor Booker, introduced him to basketball. Booker, who is four months younger than Hill, also became a player in the NBA. Hill attended North Springs High School in Atlanta, and the parents of a classmate became Hill's legal guardians. After graduating from North Springs in 2005, Hill spent a year at a prep school in Patterson, North Carolina, The Patterson School. As a junior in high school, Hill was ineligible to play on the school basketball team, so he showcased his skills to potential college coaches through an AAU club based in Smyrna, Georgia.

At the University of Arizona, Hill played three years with the Wildcats basketball team. He left Arizona ranked fifth all-time in field goal percentage (57.8%). As a junior (2008–2009), Hill started all 34 games and averaged 18.3 points and 11.0 rebounds. He earned Honorable Mention All-America from the Associated Press, Third-Team All-America honors from The Sporting News, and first-team all-conference and All-Defensive Team honors both from the Pac-10 conference that year.

== Professional career ==
=== NBA draft ===
When Hill entered the 2009 NBA draft, many had him high up on the draft board, possibly a top 5 pick in the draft. As draft night went on and Stephen Curry was taken by Golden State, it left New York to pick Jordan Hill.

=== New York Knicks (2009–2010) ===
Hill was drafted as the 8th overall pick in the 2009 NBA draft by the New York Knicks. Hill earned about $4.3 million over the next two seasons.

Hill played five games in the 2009 NBA Summer League, where he averaged 14.4 ppg, 8.2 rebounds, 0.6 assists, 0.8 steals and 1.0 block. His highest-scoring game was a 21-point performance against the Washington Wizards.

Hill scored his first regular season points for the Knicks against the Cleveland Cavaliers on November 6, 2009.

Hill was traded 25 games into his rookie season.

=== Houston Rockets (2010–2012) ===
On the trading deadline on February 18, 2010, Hill was traded along with Jared Jeffries to the Houston Rockets as part of a three-team deal that included Sacramento that saw the Rockets' Tracy McGrady go to the New York Knicks.

=== Los Angeles Lakers (2012–2015) ===
At the trade deadline again on March 15, 2012, Hill was traded to the Los Angeles Lakers for point guard Derek Fisher and a protected first-round draft pick from Dallas. Hill played in seven regular season games with the Lakers, averaging 4.7 points and 4.4 rebounds in 11.7 minutes. In 12 playoff games, he averaged 4.8 points and 6.3 rebounds in 18.1 minutes.

On July 25, 2012, Hill re-signed with the Lakers on a two-year, $8 million contract. The Lakers struggled during the 2012–13 season, but he brought hustle that was lacking in the team. On January 6, 2013, against the Denver Nuggets, Hill suffered a major injury when Denver's Andre Miller drove baseline on Lakers teammate Kobe Bryant, who inadvertently stepped on Hill's foot; however, Hill was also moving and pulled his hip. Surgery was required after doctors found loose fragments and a possible labral tear. In 29 games, he was averaging 6.7 points and 5.7 rebounds in 15.8 minutes per game. His rebounds-per-minute average was among the league's best, prompting Bryant to lament Hill's absence after the Lakers were outrebounded during a game. Hill was cleared to play during the first round of the 2013 NBA playoffs.

On November 12, 2013, in the ninth game of the 2013–14 season, Hill was a starter for the first time during the season and scored a career-high 21 points against the New Orleans Pelicans in a 116–95 Lakers home win.

On July 23, 2014, Hill re-signed with the Lakers.

=== Indiana Pacers (2015–2016) ===
On July 14, 2015, Hill signed with the Indiana Pacers. He made his debut for the Pacers in the team's season opener against the Toronto Raptors on October 28, recording 8 points and 8 rebounds off the bench in a 106–99 loss.

=== Minnesota Timberwolves (2016–2017) ===
On July 20, 2016, Hill signed with the Minnesota Timberwolves. On June 26, 2017, he was waived by the Timberwolves.

=== North American Premier League (2017–2018) ===
In 2017 and 2018, Hill played in the North American Premier Basketball league for the Nevada Desert Dogs and Vancouver Knights.

== NBA career statistics ==
Legend
| GP | Games played | GS | Games started | MPG | Minutes per game |
| FG% | Field goal percentage | 3P% | 3-point field goal percentage | FT% | Free throw percentage |
| RPG | Rebounds per game | APG | Assists per game | SPG | Steals per game |
| BPG | Blocks per game | PPG | Points per game | **Bold** | Career high |

=== Regular season ===
| Year | Team | GP | GS | MPG | FG% | 3P% | FT% | RPG | APG | SPG | BPG | PPG |
|---|---|---|---|---|---|---|---|---|---|---|---|---|
| 2009–10 | New York | 24 | 0 | 10.5 | .446 | .000 | .714 | 2.5 | .3 | .4 | .4 | 4.0 |
| 2009–10 | Houston | 23 | 0 | 16.2 | .532 | .000 | .660 | 5.0 | .6 | .2 | .5 | 6.4 |
| 2010–11 | Houston | 72 | 11 | 15.6 | .491 | .000 | .706 | 4.3 | .4 | .2 | .7 | 5.6 |
| 2011–12 | Houston | 32 | 7 | 14.7 | .504 | .000 | .641 | 4.8 | .4 | .3 | .7 | 5.0 |
| 2011–12 | L.A. Lakers | 7 | 1 | 11.7 | .467 | .000 | .625 | 4.4 | .3 | **.7** | **.9** | 4.7 |
| 2012–13 | L.A. Lakers | 29 | 1 | 15.8 | .497 | .000 | .656 | 5.7 | .4 | .3 | .7 | 6.7 |
| 2013–14 | L.A. Lakers | 72 | 32 | 20.8 | **.549** | .000 | .685 | 7.4 | .8 | .4 | **.9** | 9.7 |
| 2014–15 | L.A. Lakers | 70 | **57** | **26.8** | .459 | **.273** | .738 | **7.9** | **1.5** | .5 | .7 | **12.0** |
| 2015–16 | Indiana | **73** | 11 | 20.7 | .506 | .000 | .712 | 6.2 | 1.2 | .5 | .5 | 8.8 |
| 2016–17 | Minnesota | 7 | 0 | 6.7 | .385 | .000 | **1.000** | 2.0 | .0 | .1 | .0 | 1.7 |
| Career | | 409 | 120 | 18.8 | .497 | .136 | .699 | 5.8 | .8 | .4 | .7 | 7.9 |

=== Playoffs ===
| Year | Team | GP | GS | MPG | FG% | 3P% | FT% | RPG | APG | SPG | BPG | PPG |
|---|---|---|---|---|---|---|---|---|---|---|---|---|
| 2012 | L.A. Lakers | **12** | 0 | **18.1** | .434 | .000 | **.688** | **6.3** | .1 | **.3** | **.7** | **4.8** |
| 2013 | L.A. Lakers | 3 | 0 | 10.3 | **.500** | .000 | .000 | 3.7 | .3 | .0 | **.7** | 3.3 |
| 2016 | Indiana | 5 | 0 | 3.0 | .000 | .000 | .000 | 1.2 | **.4** | .0 | .0 | .0 |
| Career | | 20 | 0 | 13.2 | .424 | .000 | .688 | 4.7 | .2 | .2 | .5 | 3.4 |
