= Jermaine Taylor (basketball) =

American basketball player (born 1986)

Personal information
- Born: December 8, 1986 (age 39) Tavares, Florida, U.S.
- Listed height: 6 ft 4 in (1.93 m)
- Listed weight: 210 lb (95 kg)

Career information
- High school: Tavares (Tavares, Florida)
- College: UCF (2005–2009)
- NBA draft: 2009: 2nd round, 32nd overall pick
- Drafted by: Washington Wizards
- Playing career: 2009–2018
- Position: Shooting guard
- Number: 8, 3

Career history
- 2009–2010: Houston Rockets
- 2010: →Rio Grande Valley Vipers
- 2010–2011: Sacramento Kings
- 2012: Rio Grande Valley Vipers
- 2012–2013: Lagun Aro GBC
- 2013: Hapoel Tel Aviv
- 2013: Shanxi Zhongyu
- 2013–2015: Maine Red Claws
- 2015: Idaho Stampede
- 2015: Canterbury Rams
- 2015: Centro Juvenil Don Bosco
- 2016–2018: Salt Lake City Stars

Career highlights
- AP honorable mention All-American (2009); Conference USA Player of the Year (2009); First-team All-Conference USA (2009); Second-team All-C-USA (2008)
- Stats at NBA.com
- Stats at Basketball Reference

Jermaine Taylor (born December 8, 1986) is an American former professional basketball player. Taylor played college basketball for the UCF Knights team before being selected with the 32nd overall pick in the 2009 NBA draft by the Washington Wizards, and soon after traded to the Houston Rockets.

== High school career ==
Taylor attended Tavares High School in Tavares, Florida. As a senior at Tavares High School, Taylor averaged 25 points, 11 rebounds and 5 assists per game. He finished his senior year second in the Florida Class 3A Player of the Year voting and was named to the Florida Class 3A All-State First Team.

Taylor also excelled on the gridiron as a wide receiver for Tavares, gaining 481 yards and 8 touchdowns as a senior. He turned down offers from Florida and South Florida to play basketball instead.

In addition to football and basketball, finished second in the Florida Class 2A Track and Field Championships in both the triple jump and high jump. He currently owns his high school's record for the long jump, high jump, and triple jump.

After completing his high school career, Taylor signed a national letter of intent with UCF choosing the Knights over Pittsburgh, Alabama, and Penn State.

== Collegiate career ==
Taylor began his career at the University of Central Florida in 2005 during their first season in Conference USA. Taylor played in 15 games averaging 11 minutes and 4.3 points. In only his fourth collegiate game he scored 15 points in a winning effort against in-state opponent Bethune-Cookman. His best game as a freshman came during a home contest when he scored 16 points in 25 minutes of action in a 77–71 home loss.

In his sophomore campaign, he emerged as the second-leading scorer for UCF, averaging 12.7 points (good for 16th in Conference USA). Taylor's prowess as a 3-point shooter was also evident during his second year for the Knights, draining 63 3s, averaging 41.4% behind the arc. Jermaine scored 26 points twice during his second year helping UCF to a 22–9 record and a 2-seed in the Conference USA tournament.

Taylor first career start for the Knights came during his junior season, scoring 8 points in UCF's 63–60 win over University of Nevada in the inaugural game at the new UCF Arena.

Taylor is a member of the Epsilon Eta chapter of Iota Phi Theta fraternity.

=== College statistics ===
Season Averages (as of 1/11/2009)
Season	Team	G	PTS	REB	AST	STL	BLK	FG%	3P%	FT%	MIN
2005–06	UCF Knights	29	4.3	2.2	0.6	0.4	0.2	.395	.304	.440	11.7
2006–07	UCF Knights	31	12.7	3.2	1.5	0.9	0.3	.474	.414	.711	25.2
2007–08	UCF Knights	31	20.8	1.6	1.1	1.0	0.2	.461	.367	.795	33.5
2008–09	UCF Knights	31	26.2	5.2	1.9	1.3	0.8	.480	.376	.812	31.9

== Professional career ==
Taylor declared for the 2009 NBA draft and was drafted 32nd overall by the Washington Wizards. He was later traded to the Houston Rockets for cash considerations.

On January 29, 2010, Taylor was assigned to the Rio Grande Valley Vipers of the NBA Development League. On February 4, 2010, he was recalled by the Houston Rockets after scoring 32 and 30 in two games with the Vipers. He was sent back to the Vipers on February 19, 2010, but recalled four days later, and then returned to the Vipers on March 17, 2010. Taylor was recalled by the Rockets once again on March 24, 2010. He then had his first career start in a game versus the Los Angeles Lakers on March 27, 2010, in which he scored 15 points.

On December 15, 2010, Taylor was traded to the Sacramento Kings in exchange for a protected second-round pick. He was waived by the Kings at the end of the season.

In September 2012, Taylor signed with the Minnesota Timberwolves. However, he did not make the team's final roster.

On November 8, 2012, Taylor signed with the Spanish League team San Sebastián Gipuzkoa BC. In January 2013, he joined Hapoel Tel Aviv B.C. Later that month, he joined Shanxi Zhongyu of China.

On March 15, 2013, Taylor was acquired by the Maine Red Claws. In September 2013, he joined the Cleveland Cavaliers for training camp. He was later waived on October 25. On October 31, 2013, he was reacquired by the Maine Red Claws. On November 29, 2013, he was waived by the Red Claws due to a season-ending knee injury just two games into the season.

On October 31, 2014, Taylor was again reacquired by the Maine Red Claws. On January 22, 2015, he was traded to the Idaho Stampede in exchange for the returning player rights to Dallas Lauderdale. On April 28, 2015, he signed with the Canterbury Rams for the rest of the 2015 New Zealand NBL season. He made his debut for the Rams four days later and recorded 7 points and 3 assists off the bench in a loss to the Super City Rangers. In 11 games for Canterbury, he averaged 15.7 points, 3.8 rebounds, 2.1 assists and 1.2 steals per game.

On August 15, 2015, Taylor signed with Dominican club Centro Juvenil Don Bosco. However, his stint lasted just three days after falling to score in his debut game on August 17. On October 31, he was acquired by the Salt Lake City Stars of the NBA Development League.

== NBA career statistics ==
Legend
GP	Games played	GS	Games started	MPG	Minutes per game
FG%	Field goal percentage	3P%	3-point field goal percentage	FT%	Free throw percentage
RPG	Rebounds per game	APG	Assists per game	SPG	Steals per game
BPG	Blocks per game	PPG	Points per game	**Bold**	Career high

=== Regular season ===
Year	Team	GP	GS	MPG	FG%	3P%	FT%	RPG	APG	SPG	BPG	PPG
2009–10	Houston	**31**	4	9.8	.378	.227	.717	1.5	.5	.3	.1	4.1
2010–11	Houston	8	0	9.6	**.500**	**.400**	**.833**	1.1	.3	.3	**.3**	4.9
2010–11	Sacramento	26	**8**	**15.6**	.476	.300	.727	**2.0**	**1.2**	**.5**	.1	**7.1**
Career		65	12	12.1	.441	.284	.730	1.7	.7	.4	.1	5.4
