= Patrick Patterson (basketball) =

American basketball player (born 1989)

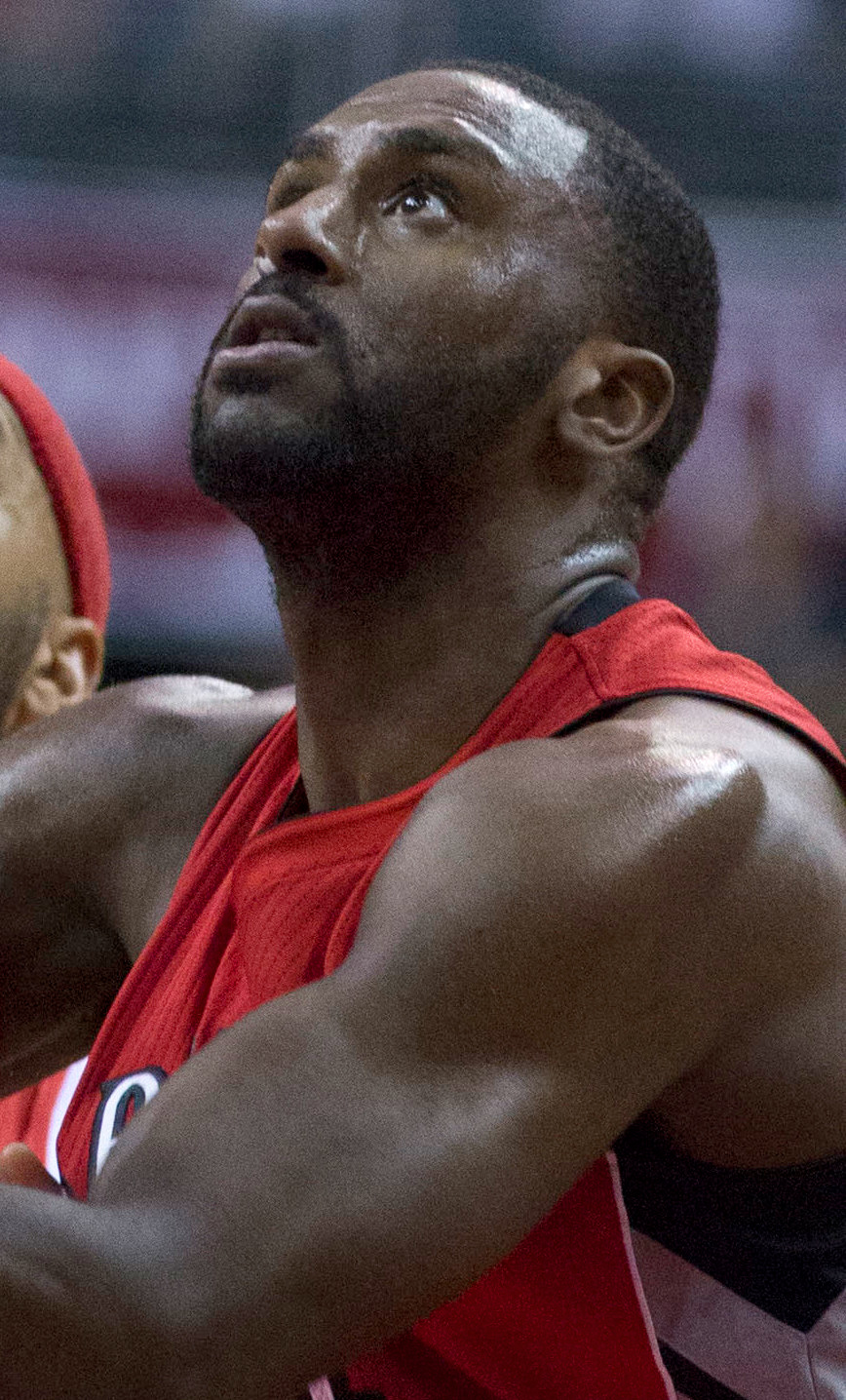
- Patterson with the Toronto Raptors in 2015

Personal information
- Born: March 14, 1989 (age 37) Washington, D.C., U.S.
- Listed height: 6 ft 8 in (2.03 m)
- Listed weight: 235 lb (107 kg)

Career information
- High school: Huntington (Huntington, West Virginia)
- College: Kentucky (2007–2010)
- NBA draft: 2010: 1st round, 14th overall pick
- Drafted by: Houston Rockets
- Playing career: 2010–2021
- Position: Power forward
- Number: 54, 9

Career history
- 2010–2013: Houston Rockets
- 2010: →Rio Grande Valley Vipers
- 2013: Sacramento Kings
- 2013–2017: Toronto Raptors
- 2017–2019: Oklahoma City Thunder
- 2019–2021: Los Angeles Clippers

Career highlights
- 2× First-team All-SEC (2009, 2010); SEC Rookie of the Year – Coaches (2008); SEC All-Defensive team (2010); Second-team Parade All-American (2007); McDonald's All-American (2007); Bill Evans Award (2006)
- Stats at NBA.com
- Stats at Basketball Reference

Patrick Davell Patterson (born March 14, 1989) is an American former professional basketball player. He played in the NBA for the Houston Rockets, Sacramento Kings, Toronto Raptors, Oklahoma City Thunder and Los Angeles Clippers.

== Early life ==
Patterson, born in Washington, D.C., grew up in Huntington, West Virginia and graduated from Huntington High School in 2007. During his high school career, Patterson helped lead Huntington High School to three straight state championships. Patterson won his third state championship during his senior season with help from O. J. Mayo.

Considered a five-star recruit by Rivals.com, Patterson was listed as the No. 3 power forward and the No. 17 player in the nation in 2007, and was named a McDonald's All-American.

== College career ==
Patrick Patterson played college basketball for the University of Kentucky (UK). He chose to play for Kentucky rather than Duke or Florida in a highly publicized recruiting battle. He was recruited by Kentucky coach Tubby Smith and his replacement Billy Gillispie. Later, in the 2009–10 season, he played for former Memphis coach John Calipari who became Gillispie's replacement in April 2009.

=== Freshman season ===
During Patterson's freshman All-American 2007–08 season, he averaged 16.4 points, 7.7 rebounds, 1.2 blocks and 0.8 steals, while shooting 57% from the field. After a Kentucky victory over the Ole Miss Rebels, Patterson missed the remainder of the 2007–08 season with a stress fracture in his left ankle. He also claimed he planned on staying at Kentucky rather than participating in the NBA draft.

=== Sophomore season ===
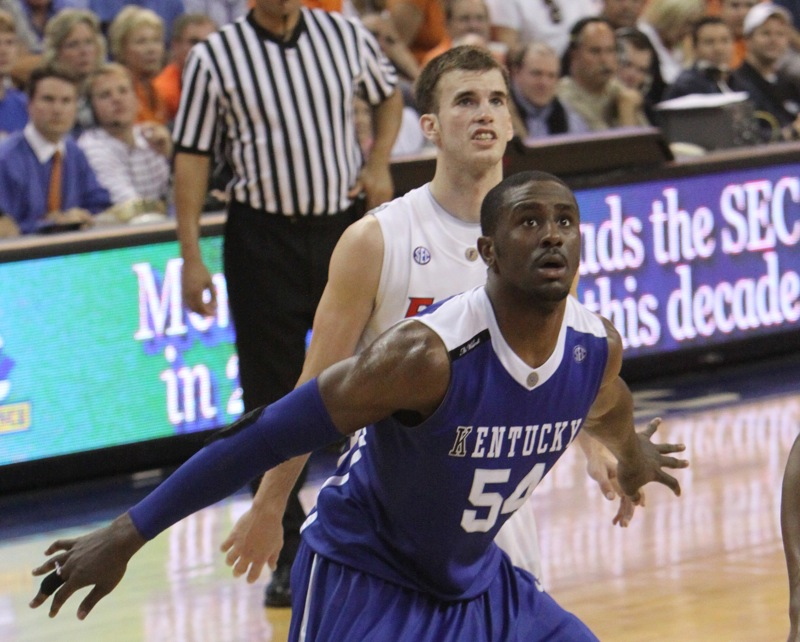
Patterson in 2009

For his sophomore season at UK during the 2008–09 season, he and teammate Jodie Meeks became one of the most successful duos that season, and also became the most productive duo at Kentucky, since the days of Dan Issel and Mike Pratt. Patterson scored a career-high 33 points, on 15-of-17 shooting, on December 22, 2008, against the Tennessee State Tigers. During Patterson's sophomore 2008–09 season, he averaged 17.9 points, 9.3 rebounds, 2.1 blocks and 0.6 steals, while shooting 60% from the field. On April 18, 2009, Patterson decided to enter his name into the 2009 NBA draft. However, on May 8, 2009, he decided he would return to Kentucky for the third season.

=== Junior season ===
Patterson continued to play a crucial role for the team during his junior season. However, with the addition of freshman players John Wall, DeMarcus Cousins and Eric Bledsoe, Patterson was no longer required to be the main option for scoring and rebounding. Patterson also improved his outside shot, shooting about 35% from the three-point line all season (compared to no three-pointers made in the previous seasons). During this season, Patterson helped the team win the SEC tournament and achieve a #1 seed in the NCAA tournament for the first time since 2004. On April 23, 2010, Patterson entered the 2010 NBA draft; by the time of the draft, he had completed his coursework and earned a degree from UK.

== Professional career ==
=== Houston Rockets (2010–2013) ===
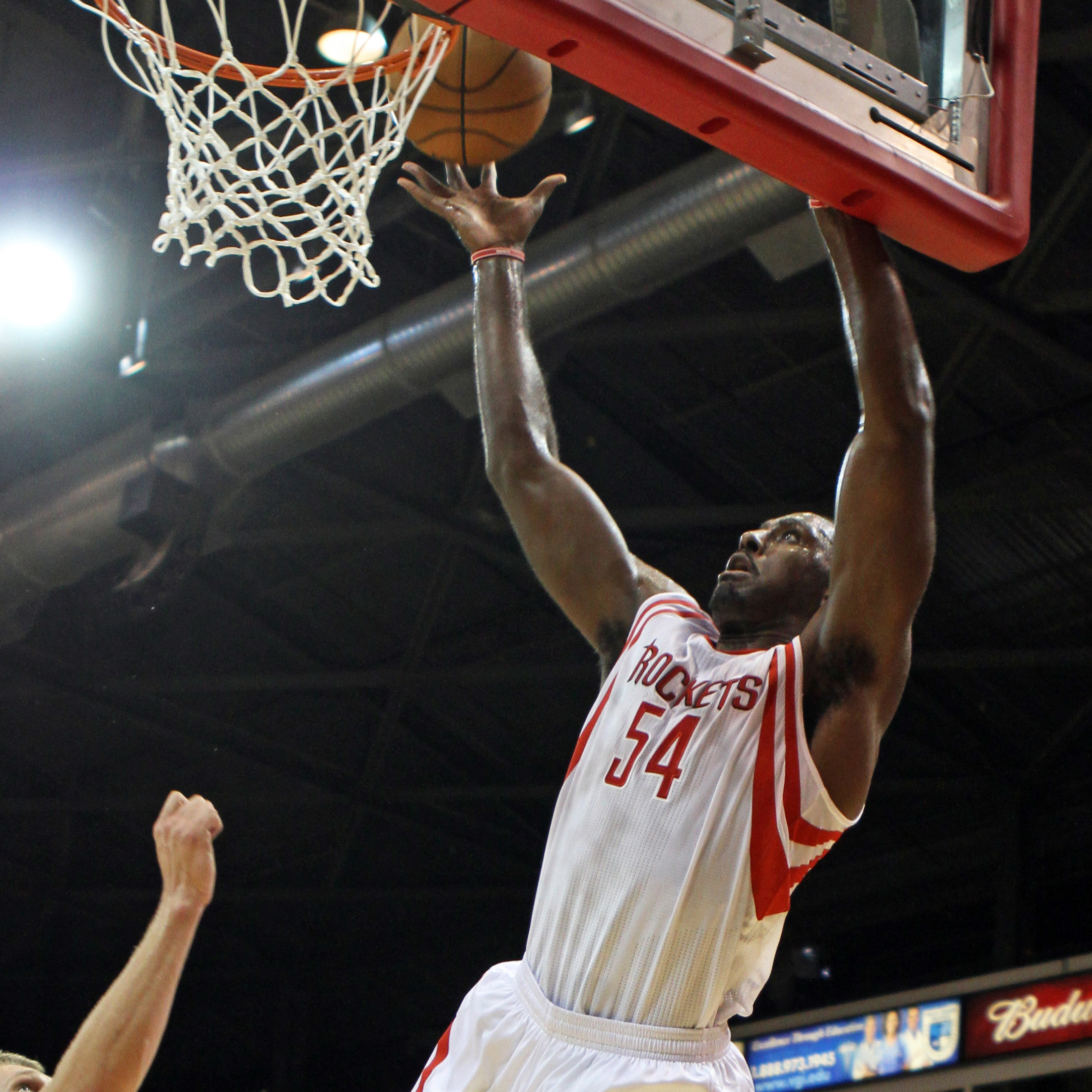
Patterson with the Houston Rockets in 2012

On June 24, 2010, Patterson was selected in the NBA draft by the Houston Rockets with the fourteenth overall pick. On November 10, he was assigned to the Rio Grande Valley Vipers of the NBA Development League. In nine games with the Vipers, Patterson averaged 18.3 points, and 10.3 rebounds in 35 minutes per game. Two days after being recalled by the Rockets, he made his NBA regular season debut on December 15, 2010.

With Luis Scola injured, Patterson had his first NBA start with the Rockets on March 14, 2011, scoring 2 points and grabbing 5 rebounds.

After the Rockets used the amnesty clause to waive Scola, Patterson became the starting power forward for the 2012–13 season.

=== Sacramento Kings (2013) ===
On February 20, 2013, Patterson was traded to the Sacramento Kings along with Toney Douglas and Cole Aldrich in exchange for Thomas Robinson, Francisco García and Tyler Honeycutt.

=== Toronto Raptors (2013–2017) ===
On December 9, 2013, the Kings traded Patterson, along with Greivis Vásquez, John Salmons and Chuck Hayes to the Toronto Raptors for Rudy Gay, Quincy Acy and Aaron Gray.

On July 12, 2014, Patterson re-signed with the Raptors to a reported three-year, $18 million contract.

=== Oklahoma City Thunder (2017–2019) ===
On July 10, 2017, Patterson signed with the Oklahoma City Thunder. On August 10, 2017, he underwent a successful arthroscopic procedure on his left knee. On August 1, 2019, Patterson and the Thunder agreed to a buyout, allowing him to become an unrestricted free agent.

=== Los Angeles Clippers (2019–2021) ===
On August 16, 2019, Patterson signed with the Los Angeles Clippers.

On September 23, 2021, Patterson signed with the Portland Trail Blazers. However, he was waived on October 16, after two preseason games.

== Career statistics ==
Legend
GP	Games played	GS	Games started	MPG	Minutes per game
FG%	Field goal percentage	3P%	3-point field goal percentage	FT%	Free throw percentage
RPG	Rebounds per game	APG	Assists per game	SPG	Steals per game
BPG	Blocks per game	PPG	Points per game	**Bold**	Career high
*	Led the league

=== NBA ===
==== Regular season ====
Year	Team	GP	GS	MPG	FG%	3P%	FT%	RPG	APG	SPG	BPG	PPG
2010–11	Houston	52	6	16.7	**.558**	.000	.714	3.8	.8	.3	**.7**	6.3
2011–12	Houston	64	1	23.2	.440	.000	.702	4.5	.8	.4	.6	7.7
2012–13	Houston	47	**38**	25.9	.519	.365	.755	4.7	1.1	.4	.6	**11.6**
2012–13	Sacramento	24	3	23.2	.494	**.444**	.786	4.8	1.3	.5	.5	8.0
2013–14	Sacramento	17	6	24.4	.410	.231	.563	**5.8**	.9	.8	.2	6.9
2013–14	Toronto	48	7	23.3	.477	.411	.745	5.1	1.3	**.9**	**.7**	9.1
2014–15	Toronto	81	4	**26.6**	.449	.371	.788	5.3	**1.9**	.7	.5	8.0
2015–16	Toronto	79	0	25.6	.414	.362	.853	4.3	1.2	.7	.4	6.9
2016–17	Toronto	65	8	24.6	.401	.372	.717	4.5	1.2	.6	.4	6.8
2017–18	Oklahoma City	**82***	3	15.5	.398	.386	**.870**	2.4	.7	.6	.3	3.9
2018–19	Oklahoma City	63	5	13.7	.374	.336	.633	2.3	.5	.3	.2	3.6
2019–20	L.A. Clippers	59	18	13.2	.408	.390	.814	2.6	.7	.1	.1	4.9
2020–21	L.A. Clippers	38	5	15.3	.436	.357	.765	2.0	.8	.4	.2	5.2
Career		719	104	20.8	.447	.369	.755	3.9	1.0	.5	.4	6.7

==== Playoffs ====
Year	Team	GP	GS	MPG	FG%	3P%	FT%	RPG	APG	SPG	BPG	PPG
2014	Toronto	7	0	28.4	.542	.389	.778	**6.7**	1.3	.4	.4	**10.4**
2015	Toronto	4	1	26.5	.556	.467	**1.000**	3.5	1.3	**.8**	.0	10.3
2016	Toronto	**20**	**9**	**29.2**	.404	.300	.846	3.9	1.2	.4	**.5**	7.7
2017	Toronto	10	1	18.5	.278	.308	**1.000**	2.0	**2.0**	.7	.2	3.4
2018	Oklahoma City	6	0	9.6	.500	.500	–	1.8	.5	.2	.0	1.3
2020	L.A. Clippers	2	0	5.0	**1.000**	**1.000**	–	.5	**2.0**	.0	.0	4.5
Career		49	10	23.3	.438	.353	.852	3.5	1.3	.4	.3	6.5

=== College ===
Year	Team	GP	GS	MPG	FG%	3P%	FT%	RPG	APG	SPG	BPG	PPG
2007–08	Kentucky	25	25	**35.7**	.574	.000	.731	7.7	1.7	**.8**	1.2	16.4
2008–09	Kentucky	34	34	33.6	**.603**	.000	**.768**	**9.3**	**2.0**	.6	**2.1**	**17.9**
2009–10	Kentucky	**38**	**38**	33.0	.575	**.348**	.692	7.4	.9	.7	1.3	14.3
Career		97	97	34.0	.604	.329	.734	8.2	1.5	.7	1.6	16.1

== Film career ==
On October 19, 2021, Patterson and Joel Reilly launched Undisputed Pictures, a film company. Later that year Patterson was credited as an executive producer for the drama North of Normal.
