= Chuck Hayes =

American basketball player (born 1983)

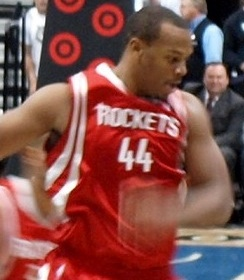
- Hayes with the Houston Rockets in 2009

Personal information
- Born: June 11, 1983 (age 43) San Leandro, California, U.S.
- Listed height: 6 ft 6 in (1.98 m)
- Listed weight: 240 lb (109 kg)

Career information
- High school: Modesto Christian School (Modesto, California)
- College: Kentucky (2001–2005)
- NBA draft: 2005: undrafted
- Playing career: 2005–2015
- Position: Center / power forward
- Number: 44, 42
- Coaching career: 2016–2018

Career history

Playing
- 2005–2006: Albuquerque Thunderbirds
- 2006–2011: Houston Rockets
- 2011–2013: Sacramento Kings
- 2013–2015: Toronto Raptors
- 2015: Houston Rockets

Coaching
- 2016–2018: Denver Nuggets (assistant)

Career highlights
- First-team All-SEC (2005); Second-team All-SEC (2004); Fourth-team Parade All-American (2001)
- Stats at NBA.com
- Stats at Basketball Reference

Charles Edward Hayes Jr. (born June 11, 1983) is an American basketball executive and former professional player who is the director of basketball operations for the Golden State Warriors of the National Basketball Association (NBA). An undersized 6 ft 6 in (1.98 m) center, he played college basketball for the University of Kentucky. From 2006 to 2015, he played in the NBA for the Houston Rockets, Sacramento Kings, and Toronto Raptors.

== High school career ==
As a junior attending Modesto Christian High School in Modesto, California, Hayes was named all-league and all-state. That year, he grabbed 31 rebounds in the 2000 Northern California championship game – a California High School record for all divisions. As a senior, Hayes was named "Mr. Basketball" in California and a Parade All-American while leading his team to the state championship game. Hayes was also named an all-state football player as a sophomore.

== College career ==
Hayes arrived at the University of Kentucky (UK) in 2001 after choosing UK over Kansas in a close recruiting battle. Hayes was named to the All-SEC Freshman Team in 2002. During the next three years, he contributed to a resurgence in Kentucky basketball along with Keith Bogans, Gerald Fitch, Erik Daniels and Kelenna Azubuike. Over Hayes' sophomore, junior and senior seasons, Kentucky accumulated a record of 87–15 (.853), and earned final AP rankings of 1st, 2nd and 7th respectively. During Hayes' senior season, the Kentucky athletics department promoted him as an All-American candidate, using the slogan "All He Does Is Win". Although Hayes was named the 2004 SEC defensive player of the year, he did not earn All-American honors.

Hayes finished his career at Kentucky ranking 7th all time in rebounds, 8th in steals, 9th in blocked shots and 35th in points. He also tied Alex Groza for the Kentucky record for most consecutive starts with 110.

Hayes was a member of the 2003 USA men's Pan American Games team. He started all five games and led the team with 7.6 rebounds per game. The team finished in fourth place with a 2–3 record playing against internationally experienced teams from North and South America.

== Professional career ==
=== NBA Development League ===
Despite earning MVP honors at the Portsmouth pre-draft camp, Hayes was not selected in the 2005 NBA draft but was signed by the Houston Rockets prior to the 2005–06 season. Hayes played in several preseason games before being cut. Hayes was then selected sixth in the 2005 NBA Development League Draft by the Albuquerque Thunderbirds. Hayes led the NBA D-League in rebounding with 12.2 a game in his tenure with the Thunderbirds.

=== NBA ===
==== Houston Rockets (2006–2011) ====
Due to a rash of injuries on the Houston roster, Hayes was signed to a 10-day contract on January 18, 2006. In his second game in a Rockets uniform, Hayes posted a double-double, collecting 12 points and 13 rebounds in a 109–108 double-overtime win over the Chicago Bulls on January 20. On January 28, the Rockets announced they were signing Hayes for the rest of the season. Hayes earned a total of $231,390 for the season between the 10-day contract and the contract for the remainder of the year. He was later joined by former Kentucky teammate Keith Bogans, who was traded by the Charlotte Bobcats for Lonny Baxter on February 9. The departure of Baxter created room in the depth chart for Hayes. Hayes was also temporarily joined by another Kentucky teammate, Gerald Fitch, who was traded to the Rockets on February 23 but was assigned to the D-League on March 7, 2006.

Hayes was quietly productive for the Rockets in his first season. He appeared in all 40 games after joining the team and averaged 13.4 minutes per game. Hayes was one of the most efficient defensive players in the league, ranking 3rd among rookies in rebounds per 48 minutes (16.1) and 14th in steals per 48 minutes (2.33). He also had an FG% of 52.6%, good for 11th highest in the league among players with at least 100 field goals attempted. On June 13, 2006, the Rockets decided to pick up the option year on his contract (which was worth $664,209), extending his stay with the Rockets through the 2006–07 season. His first official NBA start occurred November 4, 2006, against the Dallas Mavericks. Fouling out after 17 minutes, he scored 2 points, and had 3 rebounds and 2 steals.

In the 2006–07 season, Hayes played as the primary starting Power Forward for the Rockets, having more starts than teammate and Power Forward Juwan Howard, though Hayes would average less minutes per game than Howard. The scope of his role on the team was limited to rebounding, defense, and acting as a decoy or setting screens on offense. The ball was very rarely in his hands on offense. Nevertheless, he received praise from his coaches and appeared on the leaderboard for several statistics in the NBA. He finished his second season in the NBA 12th in rebounds per minute and 34th in rebounds per game.

Several factors hindered Hayes' performance during the season. He hyperextended his left knee and was sidelined for two weeks. His stamina and durability over an 82-game season was an issue as well; Hayes' style of play was more physically demanding than most. Finally, Hayes has become somewhat notorious for getting in foul trouble. He ended his second season with the third-most fouls per game and 7th-most fouls per minute in the NBA.

Although not one of the league's premier players, in 2006 Hayes signed a shoe endorsement deal with Chinese athletic apparel company Li Ning. The deal was valued at $5 million. On July 31, 2007, Hayes signed an incentive-laden contract with the Houston Rockets valued at $8 million over four years. In 2009, Hayes was named co-captain along with Shane Battier for the 2009–10 Houston Rockets.

From 2003 to 2009, Hayes had the second highest defensive adjusted plus-minus of all NBA players. Through December 25, 2009, Hayes had the fifth highest overall adjusted plus-minus for the 2009–10 NBA season.

During the 2009–10 season, Hayes had to log his minutes as the starting center, replacing the injured Yao Ming, who missed the entire season, after suffering a hairline fracture in his left foot.

On March 23, 2011, Hayes had his first career triple-double, dropping 13 points, 14 rebounds and 11 assists in a 131–112 home victory over the Golden State Warriors.

==== Sacramento Kings (2011–2013) ====
On December 9, 2011, Hayes signed a four-year, $21.3 million contract with the Sacramento Kings. However, the Kings voided the contract on December 19 after his physical exam showed a heart abnormality in an echo test, and the team conducted additional testing. Hayes then went to the Cleveland Clinic for extensive tests on his heart, and issued a statement on December 22 that cardiologists at the hospital had cleared him to play.

On December 22, 2011, Hayes and the Sacramento Kings agreed to a four-year, $22.4 million deal.

==== Toronto Raptors (2013–2015) ====
On December 9, 2013, the Kings traded Hayes, along with Greivis Vásquez, Patrick Patterson, and John Salmons to the Toronto Raptors for Rudy Gay, Quincy Acy, and Aaron Gray.

On August 31, 2015, Hayes signed with the Los Angeles Clippers. However, he was later waived by the Clippers on October 24 after appearing in four preseason games.

==== Return to Houston (2015) ====
On November 1, 2015, Hayes signed with the Houston Rockets, returning to the franchise for a second stint. A week later, he was waived by the Rockets after appearing in two games.

== Player profile ==
Hayes is listed as a forward in the NBA, but played center during the Rockets' playoff run in 2009 after injuries to starter Yao Ming and his backup Dikembe Mutombo. Although his skills and style are most suited for interior play, he always had to overcome a significant height disadvantage because he stands at only 6' 6".

Hayes delays the release on his jumpshots and free-throw attempts, which is referred to as having a "hitch". An example was seen in a game against the Utah Jazz in the 2007 NBA Playoffs, where his unorthodox release drew lane violations from three players on a free-throw attempt.

Hayes has attributed his "nose for the ball" in part to his father's influence.

== Post-playing career ==
On September 9, 2016, it was announced that Hayes would no longer play in the NBA, and instead would take on both a staff assistant role and a player development coaching role for the Denver Nuggets.

On July 29, 2023, it was announced that Hayes would become the director of basketball operations for the Golden State Warriors, fulfilling part of the role of the retiring Bob Myers.

== Personal life ==
On April 21, 2007, Hayes became a father to a baby boy, Dorian Titus Hayes. This day later marked Hayes' first career playoff start and first playoff victory as well.

Hayes married Rochelle Jackson on August 8, 2014. His wife Rochelle Hayes gave birth to their twin boys Kaine William Hayes and Kao Asiel Hayes on May 21, 2015.

Hayes has professed an interest for singing, acting and playing poker.

== NBA career statistics ==
Legend
GP	Games played	GS	Games started	MPG	Minutes per game
FG%	Field goal percentage	3P%	3-point field goal percentage	FT%	Free throw percentage
RPG	Rebounds per game	APG	Assists per game	SPG	Steals per game
BPG	Blocks per game	PPG	Points per game	**Bold**	Career high
*	Led the league

=== Regular season ===
Year	Team	GP	GS	MPG	FG%	3P%	FT%	RPG	APG	SPG	BPG	PPG
2005–06	Houston	40	0	13.4	.562	.000	.644	4.5	.4	.7	.4	3.7
2006–07	Houston	78	43	22.0	**.573**	.000	.618	6.7	.6	.9	.2	5.6
2007–08	Houston	79	44	19.9	.511	.000	.458	5.4	1.2	**1.1**	.5	3.0
2008–09	Houston	71	1	12.1	.372	.000	.368	3.5	.6	.5	.3	1.3
2009–10	Houston	**82***	**82***	21.6	.489	.000	.545	5.7	1.7	.9	.5	4.4
2010–11	Houston	74	63	**28.1**	.527	.000	.662	**8.1**	**2.7**	**1.1**	**.7**	**7.9**
2011–12	Sacramento	54	9	19.2	.429	.000	.667	4.3	1.4	.7	.3	3.2
2012–13	Sacramento	74	1	16.3	.442	.000	.625	4.0	1.5	.4	.2	2.7
2013–14	Sacramento	16	1	11.2	.438	.000	.714	2.9	.4	.7	.1	2.1
2013–14	Toronto	45	0	12.8	.429	.000	.833	3.6	.6	.5	.2	2.2
2014–15	Toronto	29	0	8.8	.478	.000	.545	1.8	.7	.3	.1	1.7
2015–16	Houston	2	0	12.0	.500	.000	**1.000**	4.0	1.0	.0	.0	2.0
Career		644	244	18.3	.498	.000	.620	5.0	1.2	.7	.4	3.7

=== Playoffs ===
Year	Team	GP	GS	MPG	FG%	3P%	FT%	RPG	APG	SPG	BPG	PPG
2007	Houston	7	**7**	**28.1**	**.706**	.000	.400	**6.4**	.4	**1.3**	.4	**3.7**
2008	Houston	6	0	18.0	.636	.000	.000	4.7	**.8**	.5	**1.0**	2.3
2009	Houston	**13**	4	13.3	.476	.000	.000	3.0	**.8**	1.0	.2	1.5
2014	Toronto	5	0	7.6	.250	.000	**1.000**	1.6	.4	.6	.0	1.2
Career		31	11	16.6	.544	.000	.571	3.9	.6	.9	.4	2.1
