= 2009–10 Houston Rockets season =

- Head coach: Rick Adelman
- General manager: Daryl Morey
- Owners: Leslie Alexander
- Arena: Toyota Center

Results
- Record: 42–40 (.512)
- Place: Division: 3rd (Southwest); Conference: 9th (Western)
- Playoff finish: Did not qualify
- Stats at Basketball Reference

Local media
- Television: My Network TV Houston, FSN Houston
- Radio: Sports Radio 610

The 2009–10 Houston Rockets season was the 43rd season of the franchise in the National Basketball Association (NBA). The news broke in the off-season when center Yao Ming would miss the upcoming season due to foot surgery. This injury would soon be considered career-threatening. Mid-season, All-Star Tracy McGrady, who was working his way back from knee surgery that kept him out of last season, was traded to the New York Knicks. Despite losing two All-Stars, the Rockets finished 42–40, but did not clinch a playoff spot.

== Key dates ==
- June 25 – The 2009 NBA draft took place in New York City.
- July 8 – The free agency period started.

== Draft picks ==
Round	Pick	Player	Position	Nationality	College
2	32	Jermaine Taylor	SG	United States	Central Florida
2	34	Sergio Llull	PG	Spain	Real Madrid (Spain)

== Roster ==
2009–10 Houston Rockets roster
Players

Pos.	No.	Player	Height	Weight	DOB	From
C	13	David Andersen	6 ft 11 in (2.11 m)	245 lb (111 kg)		Australia
SF	1	Trevor Ariza	6 ft 8 in (2.03 m)	210 lb (95 kg)		UCLA
SG	31	Shane Battier	6 ft 8 in (2.03 m)	220 lb (100 kg)		Duke
PG	0	Aaron Brooks	6 ft 0 in (1.83 m)	161 lb (73 kg)		Oregon
SF	10	Chase Budinger	6 ft 7 in (2.01 m)	218 lb (99 kg)		Arizona
PF	33	Mike Harris	6 ft 6 in (1.98 m)	235 lb (107 kg)		Rice
C	44	Chuck Hayes	6 ft 6 in (1.98 m)	238 lb (108 kg)		Kentucky
PF	27	Jordan Hill	6 ft 10 in (2.08 m)	235 lb (107 kg)		Arizona
F	20	Jared Jeffries	6 ft 11 in (2.11 m)	240 lb (109 kg)		Indiana
PG	7	Kyle Lowry	6 ft 0 in (1.83 m)	205 lb (93 kg)		Villanova
SG	12	Kevin Martin	6 ft 7 in (2.01 m)	185 lb (84 kg)		Western Carolina
PF	4	Luis Scola	6 ft 9 in (2.06 m)	245 lb (111 kg)		Argentina
SG	8	Jermaine Taylor	6 ft 4 in (1.93 m)	210 lb (95 kg)		Central Florida
C	11	Yao Ming	7 ft 6 in (2.29 m)	310 lb (141 kg)		People's Republic of China

Coaches
Head coach
- Rick Adelman (Loyola Marymount)
Assistant(s)
- Elston Turner (Mississippi)
- Jack Sikma (Illinois Wesleyan)
- T. R. Dunn (Alabama)
- R.J. Adelman (Willamette)

Legend
- (DP) Unsigned draft pick
- (FA) Free agent
- (S) Suspended
- Injured

=== Roster notes ===
- Center Yao Ming missed the entire season due to a left foot injury.

== Pre-season ==
2009 Pre-season game log: 0–0–0 (Home: 0–0–0; Road: 0–0–0)
#	Date	Visitor	Score	Home	OT	Decision	Attendance	Record	Recap
1	October 7 (in Hidalgo, Texas)	Boston Celtics	90–96	Houston Rockets

== Regular season ==
=== Standings ===
Southwest Division	W	L	PCT	GB	Home	Road	Div
y-Dallas Mavericks	55	27	.671	–	28–13	27–14	10–6
x-San Antonio Spurs	50	32	.610	5	29–12	21–20	9–7
Houston Rockets	42	40	.512	13	23–18	19–22	9–7
Memphis Grizzlies	40	42	.488	15	23–18	17–24	5–11
New Orleans Hornets	37	45	.451	18	24–17	13–28	7–9

#	Western Conference				
#	Team	W	L	PCT	GB
1	c-Los Angeles Lakers	57	25	.695	–
2	y-Dallas Mavericks	55	27	.671	2
3	x-Phoenix Suns	54	28	.659	3
4	y-Denver Nuggets	53	29	.646	4
5	x-Utah Jazz	53	29	.646	4
6	x-Portland Trail Blazers	50	32	.610	7
7	x-San Antonio Spurs	50	32	.610	7
8	x-Oklahoma City Thunder	50	32	.610	7
9	Houston Rockets	42	40	.512	15
10	Memphis Grizzlies	40	42	.488	17
11	New Orleans Hornets	37	45	.451	20
12	Los Angeles Clippers	29	53	.354	28
13	Golden State Warriors	26	56	.317	31
14	Sacramento Kings	25	57	.305	32
15	Minnesota Timberwolves	15	67	.183	42

=== Game log ===
2009–10 game log
Total: 42–40 (Home: 23–18; Road: 19–22)
October: 2–1 (home: 1–0; road: 1–1)

Game	Date	Team	Score	High points	High rebounds	High assists	Location Attendance	Record
1	October 27	@ Portland	L 87–96	Aaron Brooks (19)	Hayes, Landry; Andersen (5)	Kyle Lowry (8)	Rose Garden; 20403	0–1
2	October 28	@ Golden State	W 108–107	Trevor Ariza (25)	Luis Scola (11)	Aaron Brooks (12)	Oracle Arena; 19596	1-1
3	October 31	Portland	W 111–107	Trevor Ariza (33)	Luis Scola (6)	Aaron Brooks (8)	Toyota Center; 18100	2–1

November: 7–7 (home: 3–4; road: 4–3)

Game	Date	Team	Score	High points	High rebounds	High assists	Location Attendance	Record
4	November 2	@ Utah	W 113–96	Aaron Brooks (19)	Luis Scola (15)	Aaron Brooks (9)	EnergySolutions Arena; 19911	3–1
5	November 4	LA Lakers	L 102–103	Carl Landry (20)	Chuck Hayes (14)	Aaron Brooks (6)	Toyota Center; 18291	3–2
6	November 6	Oklahoma City	W 105–94	Trevor Ariza (21)	Luis Scola (10)	Kyle Lowry (8)	Toyota Center; 14911	4–2
7	November 10	@ Dallas	L 103–121	Aaron Brooks (22)	Chase Budinger (9)	Kyle Lowry (5)	American Airlines Center; 19720	4–3
8	November 11	Memphis	W 104–79	Luis Scola (22)	Luis Scola (15)	Kyle Lowry (10)	Toyota Center; 17220	5–3
9	November 13	@ Sacramento	L 100–109	Trevor Ariza (28)	Luis Scola (9)	Ariza, Brooks (5)	ARCO Arena; 11762	5–4
10	November 15	@ LA Lakers	W 101–91	Aaron Brooks (33)	Landry, Scola (9)	Kyle Lowry (8)	Staples Center; 18977	6–4
11	November 17	Phoenix	L 105–111	Carl Landry (27)	Carl Landry (9)	Aaron Brooks (13)	Toyota Center; 16396	6–5
12	November 18	@ Minnesota	W 97–84	Luis Scola (20)	Luis Scola (16)	Shane Battier (5)	Target Center; 11137	7–5
13	November 20	@ Atlanta	L 103–105	Luis Scola (17)	Luis Scola (10)	Kyle Lowry (7)	Philips Arena; 16674	7–6
14	November 21	Sacramento	W 113–106	Luis Scola (22)	Luis Scola (12)	Kyle Lowry (8)	Toyota Center; 16202	8–6
15	November 25	Dallas	L 99–130	Carl Landry (24)	Scola, Hayes (7)	Kyle Lowry (7)	Toyota Center; 18157	8–7
16	November 27	San Antonio	L 84–92	Luis Scola (18)	Luis Scola (12)	Trevor Ariza (5)	Toyota Center; 18164	8-8
17	November 29	@ Oklahoma City	W 100–91	Brooks, Landry (21)	Carl Landry (10)	Aaron Brooks (4)	Ford Center; 18203	9–8

December: 11–5 (home: 6–0; road: 5–5)

Game	Date	Team	Score	High points	High rebounds	High assists	Location Attendance	Record
18	December 2	@ LA Clippers	W 102–85	Aaron Brooks (22)	Luis Scola (7)	Aaron Brooks (5)	Staples Center; 13836	10–8
19	December 3	@ Golden State	W 111–109	Aaron Brooks (25)	Luis Scola (13)	Aaron Brooks (7)	Oracle Arena; 16432	11–8
20	December 5	@ Portland	L 89–90	Carl Landry (23)	Carl Landry (9)	Aaron Brooks (5)	Rose Garden; 20555	11–9
21	December 9	Cleveland	W 95–85	Aaron Brooks (27)	Luis Scola (10)	Aaron Brooks (6)	Toyota Center; 18200	12–9
22	December 11	@ Philadelphia	W 96–91	Carl Landry (20)	Trevor Ariza (12)	Trevor Ariza (3)	Wachovia Center; 13991	13–9
23	December 13	@ Toronto	L 88–101	Carl Landry (25)	Luis Scola (15)	Aaron Brooks (4)	Air Canada Centre; 17111	13–10
24	December 15	Detroit	W 107–96	Brooks, Scola (23)	Chase Budinger (12)	Aaron Brooks (10)	Toyota Center; 14899	14–10
25	December 16	@ Denver	L 101–111	Aaron Brooks (23)	David Andersen (9)	Aaron Brooks (7)	Pepsi Center; 15753	14–11
26	December 18	@ Dallas	W 116–108	Kyle Lowry (26)	Luis Scola (10)	Kyle Lowry (10)	American Airlines Center; 19890	15–11
27	December 19	Oklahoma City	W 95–90	Trevor Ariza (31)	Chuck Hayes (15)	Trevor Ariza (6)	Toyota Center; 15095	16–11
28	December 22	LA Clippers	W 108–99	Aaron Brooks (27)	Shane Battier (8)	Kyle Lowry (7)	Toyota Center; 17128	17–11
29	December 23	@ Orlando	L 87–102	Carl Landry (20)	Trevor Ariza (7)	Brooks, Battier (4)	Amway Arena; 17461	17–12
30	December 26	@ New Jersey	W 103–98	Carl Landry (26)	Trevor Ariza (11)	Trevor Ariza (8)	IZOD Center; 13374	18–12
31	December 27	@ Cleveland	L 83–108	Aaron Brooks (23)	Carl Landry (6)	Battier, Ariza, Brooks, Lowry (3)	Quicken Loans Arena; 20562	18–13
32	December 29	New Orleans	W 108–100	Aaron Brooks (27)	Luis Scola (12)	Kyle Lowry (7)	Toyota Center; 18187	19–13
33	December 31	Dallas	W 97–94	Aaron Brooks (30)	Luis Scola (13)	Trevor Ariza (7)	Toyota Center; 18306	20–13

January: 5–9 (home: 4–5; road: 1–4)

Game	Date	Team	Score	High points	High rebounds	High assists	Location Attendance	Record
34	January 2	@ New Orleans	L 95–99	Trevor Ariza (19)	Chuck Hayes (13)	Kyle Lowry (6)	New Orleans Arena; 16020	20–14
35	January 5	@ LA Lakers	L 79–88	Carl Landry (19)	Carl Landry (6)	Trevor Ariza (8)	Staples Center; 18997	20–15
36	January 6	@ Phoenix	L 110–118	Aaron Brooks (34)	Carl Landry (10)	Kyle Lowry (6)	US Airways Center; 15811	20–16
37	January 9	NY Knicks	W 105–96	Luis Scola (23)	Scola, Lowry (7)	Shane Battier (5)	Toyota Center; 15693	21–16
38	January 12	@ Charlotte	L 94–102	Trevor Ariza (19)	Luis Scola (14)	Aaron Brooks (6)	Time Warner Cable Arena; 11463	21–17
39	January 13	Minnesota	W 120–114	Aaron Brooks (43)	Chuck Hayes (17)	Trevor Ariza (7)	Toyota Center; 15175	22–17
40	January 15	Miami	L 106–115	Budinger, Scola (17)	Battier, Ariza (6)	Aaron Brooks (5)	Toyota Center; 16720	22–18
41	January 18	Milwaukee	W 101–98	Luis Scola (27)	Luis Scola (15)	Aaron Brooks (10)	Toyota Center; 17187	23–18
42	January 22	@ San Antonio	W 116–109	Brooks, Lowry (23)	Luis Scola (9)	Kyle Lowry (9)	AT&T Center; 18581	24–18
43	January 23	Chicago	L 97–104	Carl Landry (22)	Shane Battier (8)	Kyle Lowry (5)	Toyota Center; 18119	24–19
44	January 25	Atlanta	L 95–102	Carl Landry (16)	Luis Scola (8)	Aaron Brooks (5)	Toyota Center; 14998	24–20
45	January 27	Denver	L 92–97	Aaron Brooks (22)	Luis Scola (11)	Kyle Lowry (7)	Toyota Center; 16357	24–21
46	January 29	Portland	W 104–100	Aaron Brooks (33)	Battier, Scola (8)	Aaron Brooks (7)	Toyota Center; 16129	25–21
47	January 31	Phoenix	L 111–115	Aaron Brooks (24)	Shane Battier (11)	Aaron Brooks (6)	Toyota Center; 17165	25–22

February: 4–7 (home: 2–4; road: 2–3)

Game	Date	Team	Score	High points	High rebounds	High assists	Location Attendance	Record
48	February 2	Golden State	W 119–97	Brooks, Landry (24)	Chuck Hayes (13)	Aaron Brooks (6)	Toyota Center; 12845	26–22
49	February 5	@ Memphis	W 101–83	Aaron Brooks (19)	Joey Dorsey (12)	Brooks, Lowry (4)	FedExForum; 14531	27–22
50	February 6	Philadelphia	L 95–102	Aaron Brooks (34)	Carl Landry (10)	Ariza, Brooks (4)	Toyota Center; 17415	27–23
51	February 9	@ Miami	L 66–99	Luis Scola (12)	Hayes, Budinger (12)	Battier, Scola (2)	American Airlines Arena; 18654	27–24
52	February 16	Utah	L 95–104	Aaron Brooks (18)	Shane Battier (8)	Trevor Ariza (6)	Toyota Center; 14942	27–25
53	February 17	@ Milwaukee	W 127–99	Trevor Ariza (22)	Shane Battier (10)	Aaron Brooks (12)	Bradley Center; 11685	28–25
54	February 20	Indiana	L 115–125	Aaron Brooks (26)	Scola, Andersen (11)	Aaron Brooks (7)	Toyota Center; 16550	28–26
55	February 21	@ New Orleans	L 94–102	Chase Budinger (18)	Luis Scola (11)	Brooks, Ariza (8)	New Orleans Arena; 14504	28–27
56	February 24	Orlando	L 92–110	Aaron Brooks (24)	Shane Battier (9)	Aaron Brooks (8)	Toyota Center; 15749	28-28
57	February 26	San Antonio	W 109–104	Kevin Martin (33)	Luis Scola (13)	Shane Battier (5)	Toyota Center; 18195	29–28
58	February 27	@ Utah	L 110–133	Kevin Martin (32)	Budinger, Hayes (5)	Chuck Hayes (6)	EnergySolutions Arena; 19911	29–29

March: 8–8 (home: 5–4; road: 3–4)

Game	Date	Team	Score	High points	High rebounds	High assists	Location Attendance	Record
59	March 1	Toronto	W 116–92	Martin, Brooks (28)	Luis Scola (8)	Chuck Hayes (8)	Toyota Center; 13943	30–29
60	March 3	Sacramento	L 81–84	Aaron Brooks (22)	Luis Scola (18)	Luis Scola (5)	Toyota Center; 15651	30-30
61	March 6	@ Minnesota	W 112–98	Kevin Martin (30)	Luis Scola (21)	Aaron Brooks (9)	Target Center; 15587	31–30
62	March 7	@ Detroit	L 107–110	Kevin Martin (27)	Luis Scola (15)	Aaron Brooks (7)	Palace of Auburn Hills; 18422	31-31
63	March 9	@ Washington	W 96–88	Luis Scola (23)	Luis Scola (10)	Kyle Lowry (4)	Verizon Center; 10422	32–31
64	March 13	New Jersey	W 116–108	Luis Scola (44)	Luis Scola (12)	Aaron Brooks (7)	Toyota Center; 16998	33–31
65	March 15	Denver	W 125–123	Aaron Brooks (31)	Luis Scola (11)	Aaron Brooks (9)	Toyota Center; 16369	34–31
66	March 17	Memphis	W 107–94	Aaron Brooks (33)	Jordan Hill (9)	Brooks, Battier, Lowry (4)	Toyota Center; 16142	35–31
67	March 19	Boston	L 87–94	Scola, Martin (17)	Luis Scola (10)	Scola, Martin, Brooks, Lowry (3)	Toyota Center; 18198	35–32
68	March 21	@ NY Knicks	W 116–112	Kevin Martin (28)	Trevor Ariza (7)	Trevor Ariza (6)	Madison Square Garden; 17242	36–32
69	March 22	@ Chicago	L 88–98	Luis Scola (22)	Luis Scola (10)	Aaron Brooks (6)	United Center; 19834	36–33
70	March 24	@ Oklahoma City	L 104–122	Luis Scola (25)	Mike Harris (8)	Aaron Brooks (7)	Ford Center; 18203	36–34
71	March 25	LA Clippers	L 93–99	Brooks, Ariza (18)	Luis Scola (14)	Aaron Brooks (9)	Toyota Center; 15201	36–35
72	March 27	LA Lakers	L 101–109	Luis Scola (28)	Luis Scola (10)	Aaron Brooks (7)	Toyota Center; 18583	36-36
73	March 30	Washington	W 98–94	Chase Budinger (24)	Scola, Brooks (8)	Aaron Brooks (11)	Toyota Center; 14395	37–36
74	March 31	@ San Antonio	L 102–119	Aaron Brooks (21)	Jermaine Taylor (10)	Kyle Lowry (5)	AT&T Center; 18581	37–37

April: 5–3 (home: 2–1; road: 3–2)

Game	Date	Team	Score	High points	High rebounds	High assists	Location Attendance	Record
75	April 2	@ Boston	W 119–114	Aaron Brooks (30)	Luis Scola (11)	Aaron Brooks (9)	TD Garden; 18624	38–37
76	April 4	@ Indiana	L 102–133	Chase Budinger (17)	Luis Scola (6)	Aaron Brooks (5)	Conseco Fieldhouse; 14201	38-38
77	April 6	@ Memphis	W 113–103	Kevin Martin (29)	Jared Jeffries (10)	Aaron Brooks (7)	FedExForum; 11673	39–38
78	April 7	Utah	W 113–96	Martin, Brooks (28)	Chuck Hayes (18)	Brooks, Lowry (5)	Toyota Center; 15004	40–38
79	April 9	Charlotte	W 97–90	Aaron Brooks (23)	Ariza, Scola (9)	Trevor Ariza (8)	Toyota Center; 16488	41–38
80	April 11	@ Phoenix	L 106–116	Luis Scola (30)	Scola, Hayes (8)	Aaron Brooks (6)	US Airways Center; 18422	41–39
81	April 12	@ Sacramento	W 117–107	Kevin Martin (39)	Hayes, Jeffries (7)	Kyle Lowry (11)	ARCO Arena; 14549	42–39
82	April 14	New Orleans	L 115–123	Trevor Ariza (26)	Trevor Ariza (10)	Trevor Ariza (10)	Toyota Center; 18191	42–40

2009–10 season schedule

== Player statistics ==
Legend
GP	Games played	GS	Games started	MPG	Minutes per game
FG%	Field-goal percentage	3P%	3-point field-goal percentage	FT%	Free-throw percentage
RPG	Rebounds per game	APG	Assists per game	SPG	Steals per game
BPG	Blocks per game	PPG	Points per game

=== Regular season ===
Houston Rockets statistics
Player	GP	GS	MPG	FG%	3P%	FT%	RPG	APG	SPG	BPG	PPG
David Andersen	63	0	14.1	.432	.346	.687	3.3	.7	.2	.2	5.8
Trevor Ariza	72	71	36.5	.394	.334	.649	5.6	3.8	1.8	.6	14.9
Hilton Armstrong	9	0	4.4	.294	.000	.000	.7	.3	.6	.0	1.1
Shane Battier	67	62	32.4	.398	.362	.726	4.7	.8	.8	1.1	8.0
Aaron Brooks	82	82	35.6	.432	.398	.822	2.6	5.3	.8	.2	19.6
Chase Budinger	74	4	20.1	.441	.369	.770	3.0	1.2	.5	.1	8.9
Will Conroy	5	0	7.2	.300	.300	.000	.6	1.4	.0	.0	1.2
Brian Cook	15	0	2.9	.304	.222	.714	.6	.1	.0	.1	1.4
Joey Dorsey	7	0	7.7	.455	.	.500	3.6	.3	.3	.1	1.6
Mike Harris	8	0	10.3	.370	.000	.556	2.5	.4	.5	.1	3.1
Chuck Hayes	82	82	21.6	.489	.	.545	5.7	1.7	.9	.5	4.4
Jordan Hill	23	0	16.2	.532	.	.660	5.0	.6	.2	.5	6.4
Jared Jeffries	18	0	18.4	.429	.111	.556	3.6	1.0	.5	.7	4.9
Carl Landry	52	1	27.2	.547	.	.839	5.5	.8	.5	.9	16.1
Kyle Lowry	68	0	24.3	.397	.272	.827	3.6	4.5	.9	.1	9.1
Kevin Martin	24	22	35.8	.435	.310	.924	2.9	2.3	1.0	.1	21.3
Tracy McGrady	6	0	7.7	.368	.500	.667	.8	1.0	.0	.3	3.2
Pops Mensah-Bonsu	4	0	3.3	.250	.	.500	1.0	.3	.3	.3	1.3
Luis Scola	82	82	32.6	.514	.200	.779	8.6	2.1	.8	.3	16.2
Jermaine Taylor	31	4	9.8	.378	.227	.717	1.5	.5	.3	.1	4.1
Garrett Temple	9	0	13.1	.448	.250	.667	1.6	.8	.4	.4	5.0

== Awards, records and milestones ==
=== Awards ===
==== Season ====
- Aaron Brooks, NBA Most Improved Player Award

== Injuries and surgeries ==
- Yao Ming missed the entire season with a stress fracture in his left ankle.

== Transactions ==
=== Trades ===
June 25, 2009

To Houston Rockets

- Rights to Jermaine Taylor
To Washington Wizards

- Cash considerations
June 25, 2009

To Houston Rockets

- Sergio Llull
To Denver Nuggets

- Cash considerations
June 25, 2009

To Houston Rockets

- Rights to Chase Budinger
To Detroit Pistons

- Future second-round pick
- Cash considerations
July 14, 2009

To Houston Rockets

- Rights to David Andersen
To Atlanta Hawks

- Future second-round pick
- Cash and future considerations
September 22, 2009

To Houston Rockets

- Rights to Axel Hervelle
To Denver Nuggets

- James White
February 18, 2010
To Sacramento Kings

Larry Hughes (From New York)
Carl Landry (From Houston)
Joey Dorsey (From Houston)
To New York Knicks

Tracy McGrady (from Houston)
Sergio Rodríguez (from Sacramento)

To Houston Rockets

Kevin Martin (from Sacramento)
Jared Jeffries (from New York)
Jordan Hill (From New York)
Hilton Armstrong (From Sacramento)
2012 protected first-round pick (from New York)
Rights to exchange 2011 first-round picks with New York

=== Free agents ===
Additions
Player	Date signed	Former team
Trevor Ariza	July 8	Los Angeles Lakers
Pops Mensah-Bonsu	September 3	Toronto Raptors
Mike Harris	December 22	Rio Grande Valley Vipers
Will Conroy	January 28	Rio Grande Valley Vipers

Subtractions
Player	Date signed	New Team
Ron Artest	July 8	Los Angeles Lakers
Pops Mensah-Bonsu	November 16	Toronto Raptors
