= Mike Harris (basketball) =

American basketball player (born 1983)

Personal information
- Born: June 15, 1983 (age 42) Hillsboro, Texas, U.S.
- Listed height: 6 ft 6 in (1.98 m)
- Listed weight: 235 lb (107 kg)

Career information
- High school: Hillsboro (Hillsboro, Texas)
- College: Rice (2001–2005)
- NBA draft: 2005: undrafted
- Playing career: 2005–2022
- Position: Small forward

Career history
- 2005–2006: BC Kyiv
- 2006–2007: Colorado 14ers
- 2007–2009: Dongguan Leopards
- 2008: Houston Rockets
- 2009: Al Qadsia
- 2009–2010: Rio Grande Valley Vipers
- 2009–2010: Houston Rockets
- 2010: Washington Wizards
- 2010–2011: Houston Rockets
- 2010–2012: Shanghai Sharks
- 2011–2012: Atléticos de San Germán
- 2012–2013: Jiangsu Dragons
- 2013–2015: Leones de Ponce
- 2013: Utah Jazz
- 2014: Zhejiang Golden Bulls
- 2014–2015: Qingdao Eagles
- 2015–2017: Sichuan Blue Whales
- 2017: Leones de Ponce
- 2017: Fujian Sturgeons
- 2018: Al Riyadi Beirut
- 2018: Alaska Aces
- 2019: Al-Muharraq
- 2019: Henan Golden Elephants
- 2019–2020: Changwon LG Sakers
- 2020: Al-Shamal
- 2020: Indios de Mayagüez
- 2021: Al-Ahli Club
- 2021–2022: Magnolia Hotshots

Career highlights
- Bahraini Premier League champion (2021); Chinese NBL Player of the Year (2019); Chinese NBL Import Player of the Year (2019); PBA Best Import of the Conference (2018); West Asian Basketball Cup champion (2018); CBA champion (2016); CBA Player of the Year (2016); 2× BSN champion (2014, 2015); 2× BSN Finals MVP (2014, 2015); BSN Most Valuable Player (2013); 2× All-Baloncesto Superior Nacional First Team (2013, 2014); 3× All-BSN Second Team (2011, 2012, 2015); Baloncesto Superior Nacional Import Player of the Year (2014); 5× BSN All-Import Team (2011–2015); NBA D-League champion (2010); NBA D-League Finals MVP (2010); NBA D-League Most Valuable Player (2010); NBA D-League All-Star (2010); All-NBA D-League First Team (2010); 2× First-team All-WAC (2004, 2005)
- Stats at NBA.com
- Stats at Basketball Reference

Michael Latrent Harris (born June 15, 1983) is an American former professional basketball player.

== College career ==
Harris played college basketball for Rice University and finished his career as Rice's all-time leading scorer (2,014 points) and rebounder (1,111 boards).

== Professional career ==
Harris played professionally for BC Kyiv of the Ukrainian Super League during the 2005–06 season. In the 2006–07 NBA preseason, Harris was signed by the Milwaukee Bucks, with whom he averaged 6.0 points per game and 2.4 rebounds per game in five preseason games before being cut from the team before the regular season started. Harris then spent the 2006–07 season with the Colorado 14ers of the NBA D-League. He averaged 11.8 points per game, 6.8 rebounds per game and 1.54 blocks per game in 48 games with the 14ers during the 2006–07 season.

Harris then signed a non-guaranteed deal with the Houston Rockets on July 13, 2008, and after averaging 5.0 points per game and 6.0 rebounds per game in Houston's first two preseason games, he was by waived the club before the season started on October 22.

In the 2007–08 season, Harris played for the Dongguan Leopards of the Chinese Basketball Association (CBA), averaging 28 minutes played per game, with 24.3 points per game and 11.6 rebounds per game in 25 games played. Following the end of the CBA season, Harris signed a 10-day NBA contract with the Houston Rockets on March 9, 2008, and after that he earned a contract from the club for the remainder of the season, with a team option for the next season. During the 2008–09 NBA preseason, Harris was released once again by the Rockets.

In the 2009–2010 season, Harris was signed by the Rio Grande Valley Vipers of the D-League. After averaging 25.3 points with the Vipers, he was signed by the Houston Rockets. On January 6, 2010, Harris was waived by Houston. Later that season, Harris briefly played for the Washington Wizards, before rejoining the Vipers. On March 24, 2010, he signed with the Houston Rockets for another stint. He was reassigned to the Vipers on April 13, 2010. Harris was also named the 09-10 NBA D-League MVP along winning the NBA D-League Championship in a 2-0 victory over the 66ers. He posted 26 points and 16 rebounds in Game 2.

In the summer of 2012, Harris signed with the Minnesota Timberwolves. However, he was waived before the start of the 2012–13 season. Later that fall, he signed with the Jiangsu Dragons in China. At the end of the Chinese season, he joined the Leones de Ponce in Puerto Rico. During that season, Harris was chosen the Most Valuable Player of the league, averaging 20.4 ppg and 10.2 rpg.

On September 26, 2013, he signed with the Utah Jazz. On January 7, 2014, he was waived by the Jazz after 20 games, averaging 4.2 points per game. On January 22, 2014, he signed with the Zhejiang Golden Bulls in China for the rest of the 2013–14 CBA season. At the end of the Chinese season, he re-signed with the Leones de Ponce of Puerto Rico. Harris led the Leones de Ponce to the championship that season, and carried off the Finals MVP award. Harris was widely acclaimed as the best player in the Baloncesto Superior Nacional during this time.

In September 2014, he returned to China and signed with the Qingdao Eagles for the 2014–15 CBA season. On April 10, 2015, he re-signed with Leones de Ponce.

In October 2015, he signed with Sichuan Blue Whales for the 2015–16 CBA season. Harris helped lead Sichuan to their first-ever CBA title the following March, and re-signed with the Blue Whales for the 2016-17 CBA season, but missed much of the campaign with an injury.

Harris returned to Puerto Rico for another stint with the Leones de Ponce in the summer of 2017. He then signed with the Fujian Sturgeons in China for the 2017-18 CBA season.

Since his 2017-18 CBA season and departure from the Fujian Sturgeons, he has had multiple different stints in different leagues overseas.

He announced his retirement in 2022.

== NBA career statistics ==
Legend
GP	Games played	GS	Games started	MPG	Minutes per game
FG%	Field goal percentage	3P%	3-point field goal percentage	FT%	Free throw percentage
RPG	Rebounds per game	APG	Assists per game	SPG	Steals per game
BPG	Blocks per game	PPG	Points per game	**Bold**	Career high

=== Regular season ===
Year	Team	GP	GS	MPG	FG%	3P%	FT%	RPG	APG	SPG	BPG	PPG
2007–08	Houston	17	0	9.4	**.500**	.000	.615	**3.2**	.2	.4	.2	3.6
2009–10	Houston	8	0	10.3	.370	.000	.556	2.5	**.4**	.5	.1	3.1
2009–10	Washington	5	0	2.8	.333	.000	**1.000**	.8	.0	.2	.0	.8
2010–11	Houston	4	0	4.0	**.500**	.000	.500	1.3	.3	.0	.3	2.0
2013–14	Utah	**20**	0	**11.3**	.475	.000	.963	1.7	.3	**.8**	**.4**	**4.2**
Career		54	0	9.2	.464	.000	.782	2.1	.2	.5	.2	3.4

=== Playoffs ===
Year	Team	GP	GS	MPG	FG%	3P%	FT%	RPG	APG	SPG	BPG	PPG
2008	Houston	3	0	3.0	.500	.000	.500	.7	.0	.0	.0	1.0
Career		3	0	3.0	.500	.000	.500	.7	.0	.0	.0	1.0

== See also ==
- List of NCAA Division I men's basketball players with 2000 points and 1000 rebounds
