= Kevin Martin (basketball, born 1983) =

American basketball player (born 1983)

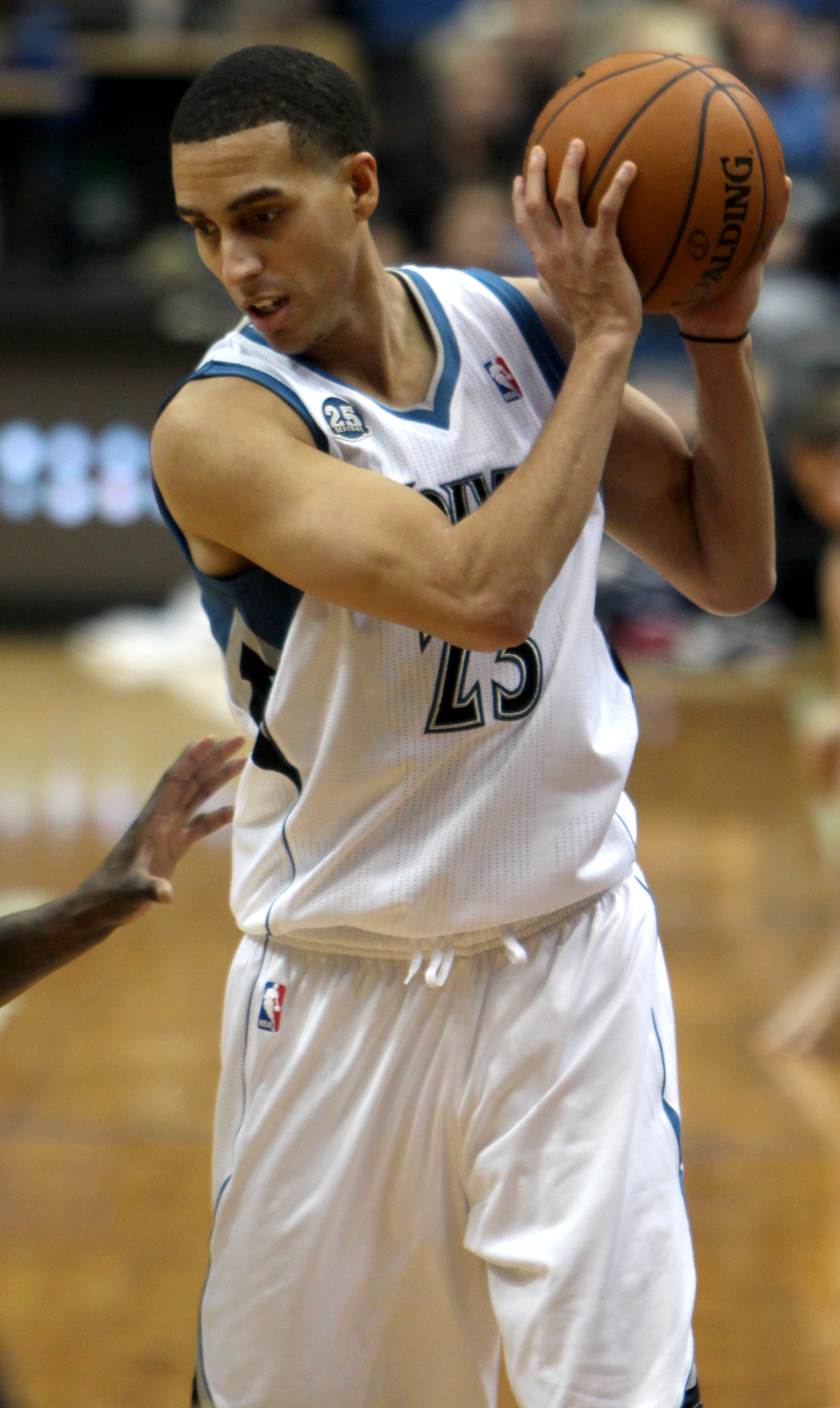
- Martin with the Minnesota Timberwolves in 2014

Personal information
- Born: February 1, 1983 (age 43) Zanesville, Ohio, U.S.
- Listed height: 6 ft 7 in (2.01 m)
- Listed weight: 199 lb (90 kg)

Career information
- High school: Zanesville (Zanesville, Ohio)
- College: Western Carolina (2001–2004)
- NBA draft: 2004: 1st round, 26th overall pick
- Drafted by: Sacramento Kings
- Playing career: 2004–2016
- Position: Shooting guard
- Number: 23, 12

Career history
- 2004–2010: Sacramento Kings
- 2010–2012: Houston Rockets
- 2012–2013: Oklahoma City Thunder
- 2013–2016: Minnesota Timberwolves
- 2016: San Antonio Spurs

Career highlights
- 2× First-team All-SoCon (2003, 2004); Second-team All-SoCon (2002); SoCon All-Freshman Team (2002); No. 32 retired by Western Carolina Catamounts

Career statistics
- Points: 12,396 (17.4 ppg)
- Rebounds: 2,278 (3.2 rpg)
- Assists: 1,352 (1.9 apg)
- Stats at NBA.com
- Stats at Basketball Reference

Kevin Dallas Martin Jr. (born February 1, 1983) is an American former professional basketball player who played 12 seasons in the National Basketball Association (NBA). He played college basketball for the Western Carolina Catamounts, where in his junior year, he averaged 24.9 points per game, which ranked second in the nation. After three years at Western Carolina, he entered the 2004 NBA draft and was selected with the 26th overall pick by the Sacramento Kings.

== Early life ==
Martin was born in Zanesville, Ohio, to Kevin Sr. and Marilyn Martin. He grew up idolizing Michael Jordan. He played for Zanesville High School and was fourth in the voting for Ohio Mr. Basketball as a Senior, finishing behind the first Sophomore winner LeBron James.

== College career ==
He received a full scholarship to Western Carolina University, where he majored in sport management. On November 22, 2002, Martin scored a college career-high 46 points in a loss against Coastal Carolina. On November 21, 2003, Martin scored 44 points in a loss against Georgia. He ranks fourth all-time on Western Carolina's scoring list with 1,838 points. Martin averaged 23.3 points, 4.5 rebounds and 1.7 assists per game during his three years in college.

== Professional career ==
=== Sacramento Kings (2004–2010) ===
Martin was a standout while at Western Carolina. Due to his success, he was selected by the Sacramento Kings with the 26th overall pick in the 2004 NBA draft.

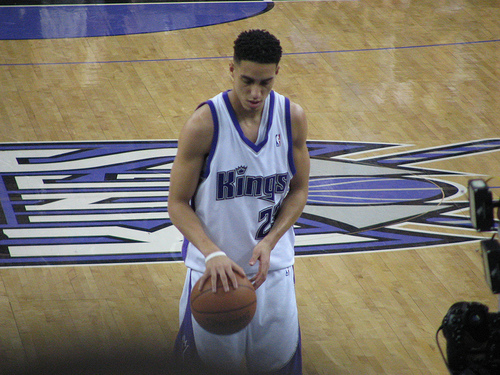
Martin in 2005 during his tenure with the Kings

In the 2004–05 season, Martin averaged 2.9 points, 1.3 rebounds and 0.5 assists per game, and played sparingly, averaging just 10 minutes a game.

Martin showed much improvement the following year, averaging 10.8 points, 3.6 rebounds, and 1.3 assists. Martin also started from time to time during the 2005–06 season in part by the injury of Bonzi Wells. This included a start at small forward due to Ron Artest being suspended for Game Two of the team's first-round playoff series against the San Antonio Spurs following a flagrant foul (elbow to the head) on Manu Ginóbili. He is best known in that series for making the game winning buzzer beater in Game 3 in Sacramento that gave the Kings a 1–2 series against the Spurs. His shot was also over the San Antonio Spurs' Tim Duncan.

When interviewed on a segment by TNT during a game, Martin credited Doug Christie for helping him learn how to defend in the NBA. Likewise, Martin also credited Cuttino Mobley for helping him with his shooting. Martin played behind both guards during their tenure with the Kings.

In the general managers' survey at the start of the 2006–07 NBA season, Martin tied for second as the player most likely to have a breakout campaign, behind the Orlando Magic's Dwight Howard. During the 2006–07 season, Martin proved himself to be among the top scorers in the NBA, averaging 20.2 points per game, while averaging 4.3 rebounds and 2.2 assists, all career highs. He is also one of the best shooters in the league with a 47.3% shooting percentage from the field and 38.1% from beyond the three-point arc (along with 84.4% FT shooting). Martin finished second to Monta Ellis in the NBA Most Improved Player Award. Ellis edged Martin by three points in the closest voting in the award's history.

On March 17, 2007, Martin led the Kings to a 95–83 road win over the Orlando Magic and joined Nate Archibald as the only other player in NBA history to score at least 20 points in a game with only one field goal made. Martin tallied 20 points on 1-8 FG from the field (1–1 3pt) while knocking down 17-20 FT from the foul line.

On August 28, 2007, the Sacramento Kings and Martin agreed to a 5-year, $55 million deal.

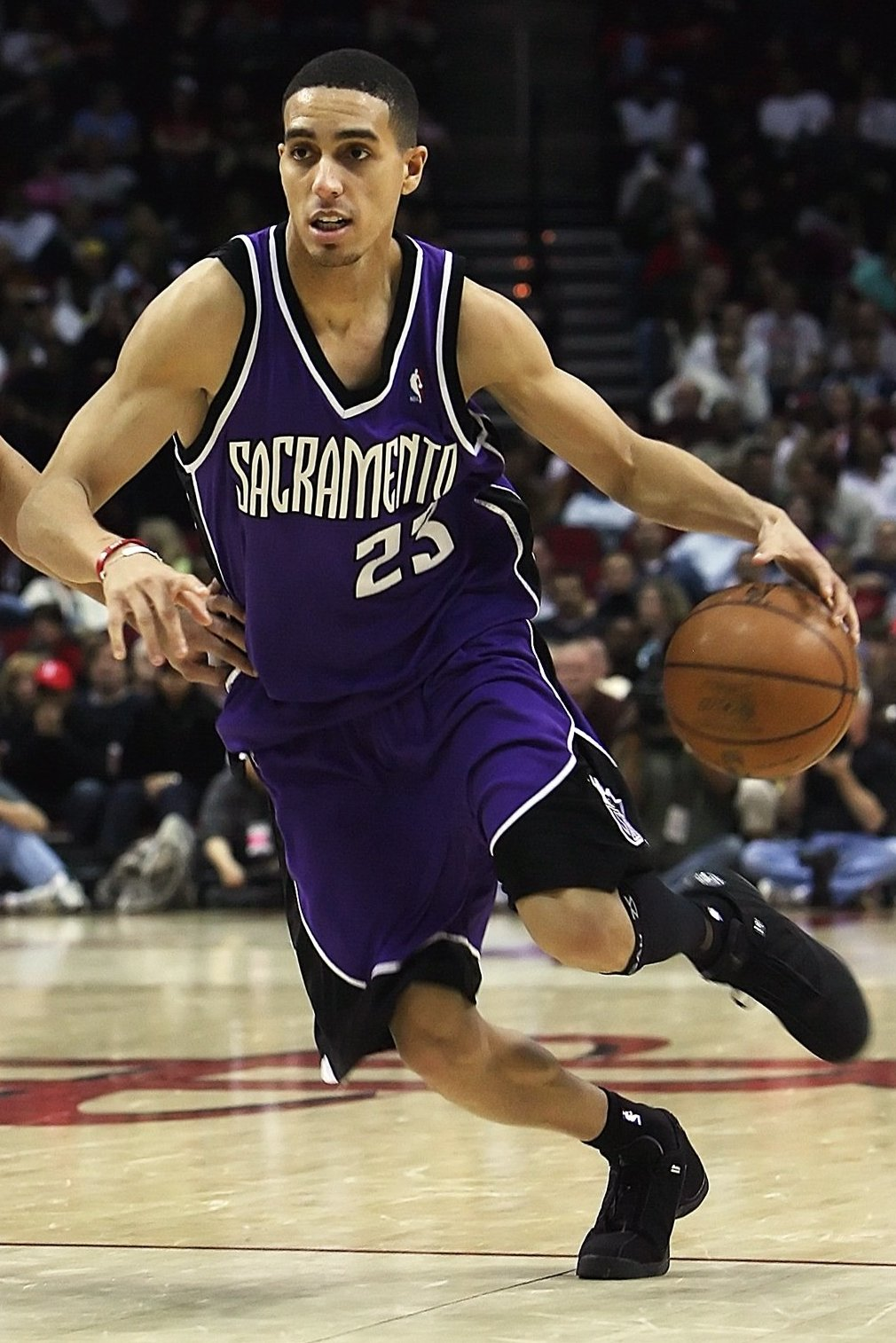
Martin with the Kings in 2008

Martin got off to a fast start to the NBA season, while in the first 15 games was the NBA's leading scorer with 29.6 PPG. Martin finished the season 6th in the NBA in scoring at 23.7 PPG, 4.5 RPG, 2.1 APG and averaging 45% from the court and 40% from three-point range. However, he missed 17 games due to a groin injury. Also during the year, on March 7, 2008, Martin scored 48 points in a loss against the Minnesota Timberwolves.

Martin became the leader of the team following the Ron Artest trade during the offseason. He started the season strong, however he suffered an ankle injury which kept him out 15 games. He returned, but re-aggravated his injury shortly thereafter. After returning again, he helped the Kings snap a 6-game losing streak. Martin averaged 24.6 points per game during the remainder of the season, including an overtime loss on April 1, 2009, against the Golden State Warriors, in which he scored a career-high 50 points and became the first King to score 50-plus since Chris Webber in 2001. On November 2, 2009, Martin scored 48 points including 7–10 from three-point range to lead the Kings to an overtime victory over the Memphis Grizzlies.

=== Houston Rockets (2010–2012) ===
Martin was traded during the 2009–10 season to the Houston Rockets on February 18, 2010, as part of a three-way trade including the New York Knicks and the Sacramento Kings, sending Larry Hughes, Joey Dorsey, and Carl Landry to Sacramento. In his debut as a Rocket, Martin scored just 3–16 from the field, but 8–9 from the line, ending the game with 14 points, in a 125–115 loss to the Indiana Pacers. On April 12, in his first game back in Sacramento's Arco Arena, Martin scored 39 points, scoring 11 of 20, making all 16 of his foul shot attempts.

On December 11, 2010, Martin scored 40 points in a 110–95 win against the Cleveland Cavaliers and went on to score a season-high 45 points in a loss against the Portland Trail Blazers on January 5, 2011. By the end of the season he averaged 23.5 points per game in 32 minutes per game. Martin shot .383 at the three-point line, and he was also near .900 from free throw range. Martin averaged 7.4 made free throws per game, second in the NBA to only Kevin Durant.

After commissioner David Stern, acting as owner of the New Orleans Hornets at the time, vetoed a three-team deal involving the Rockets and the Los Angeles Lakers that would have sent Martin, Luis Scola, Goran Dragić, and Lamar Odom to New Orleans, he stayed with Houston for the lockout-shortened season. Martin suffered a shoulder injury on February 2. He tried to play through the injury but ended up re-aggravating the injury when he ran into a screen against the Cleveland Cavaliers on March 11. An MRI revealed a labral tear in his right shoulder, and he missed the rest of the season. With new rules regarding foul calls, in addition to playing injured, Martin's numbers dropped, averaging just 17.1 points per game, the worst in his career as a full-time starter. While he was still able to make a high percentage of his free throws, he only got to the line about half as often as the previous season.

=== Oklahoma City Thunder (2012–2013) ===
On October 27, 2012, Martin was traded along with Jeremy Lamb and three future draft picks to the Oklahoma City Thunder for James Harden, Daequan Cook, Lazar Hayward, and Cole Aldrich. In game six of the Western Conference Quarterfinals, Martin scored 25 points in a 103–94 win, as the Thunder eliminated his former team the Houston Rockets.

=== Minnesota Timberwolves (2013–2016) ===
On July 2, 2013, it was reported Martin had agreed to sign a four-year, $28 million contract with the Minnesota Timberwolves. Martin reportedly also received interest from the Oklahoma City Thunder, New Orleans Pelicans, and Milwaukee Bucks. On July 11, 2013, he was officially acquired by the Timberwolves as part of a three-team trade involving the Thunder and the Bucks that sent the rights to Szymon Szewczyk to Oklahoma City and Luke Ridnour to Milwaukee. On November 3, 2013, Martin scored 30 points, including 5–5 three-pointers as the Timberwolves defeated the New York Knicks.

On November 25, 2014, Martin was sidelined for six to eight weeks after undergoing surgery to repair a fracture in his right wrist.

On March 1, 2016, Martin was waived by the Timberwolves in a buyout agreement.

=== San Antonio Spurs (2016) ===
On March 9, 2016, Martin signed with the San Antonio Spurs. His best effort as a Spur came on April 8, 2016, when he scored 17 points against the Denver Nuggets. Martin's final appearance came on May 12, 2016, in the Spurs' loss to the Oklahoma City Thunder in Game 6 of the Western Conference semi-finals; he recorded two rebounds in just under six minutes off the bench.

=== Retirement ===
On November 24, 2016, Martin announced his retirement from the NBA.

== Player profile ==
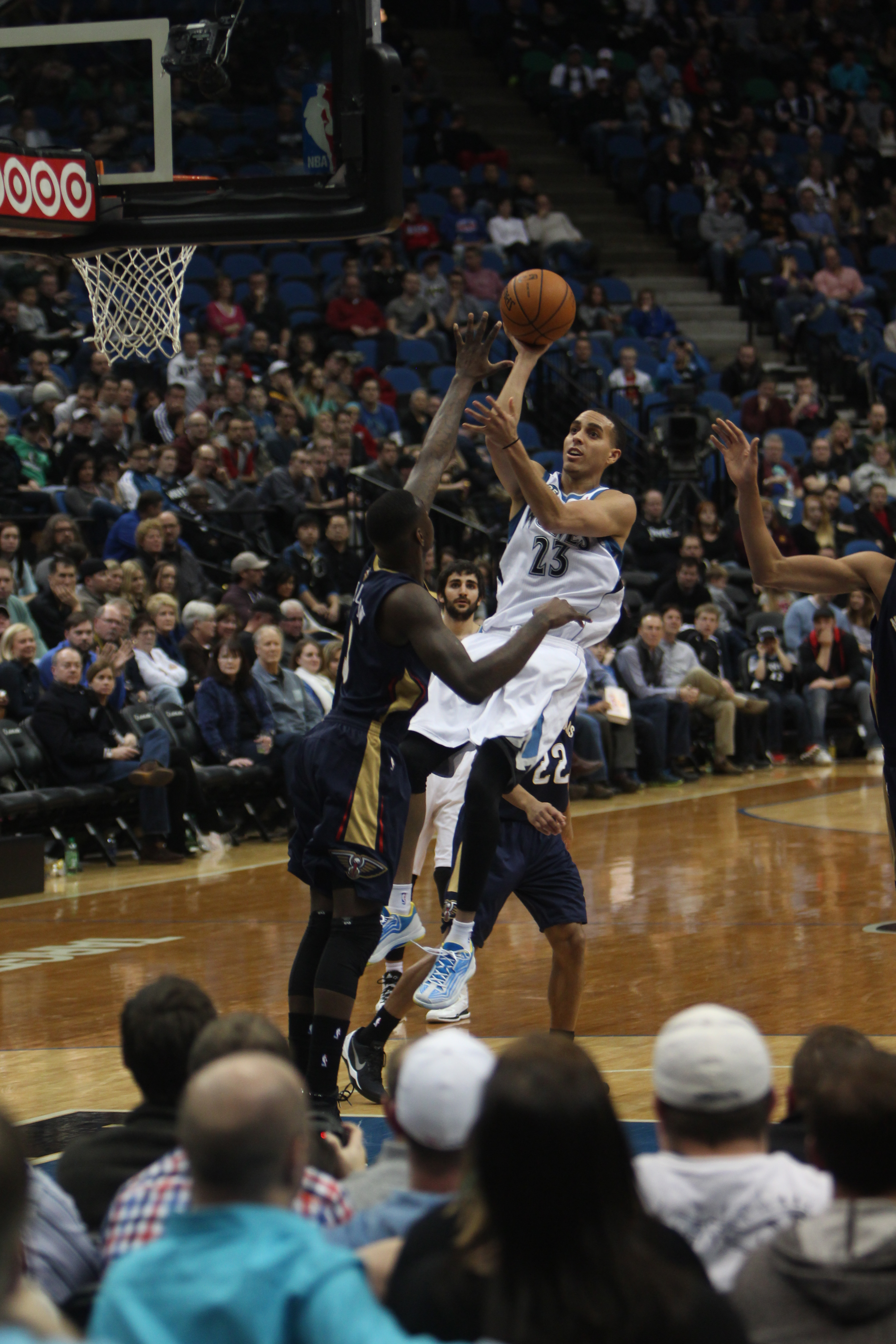
Martin attacking the rim during a game in 2014

Standing at six feet, seven inches tall and weighing in at 200 pounds, Martin played the shooting guard position. With a career points-per-game average of 17.4, he established himself as one of the most efficient scorers in the NBA. Despite his unorthodox shooting stroke and skinny frame, he made significant contributions offensively. He was also known for his quickness. Martin went to the free throw line frequently and shot a great percentage; he led the NBA in free throws made in 2010–11. He was considered an average defender who had good awareness but lacked strength. In a 2010 interview, Reggie Miller was asked which NBA players reminded him of his own playing style. Miller responded: "Game-wise I would say Richard Hamilton and Kevin Martin. Thin, great coming off screens, can knock down threes."

== NBA career statistics ==
Legend
GP	Games played	GS	Games started	MPG	Minutes per game
FG%	Field goal percentage	3P%	3-point field goal percentage	FT%	Free throw percentage
RPG	Rebounds per game	APG	Assists per game	SPG	Steals per game
BPG	Blocks per game	PPG	Points per game	**Bold**	Career high

=== Regular season ===
Year	Team	GP	GS	MPG	FG%	3P%	FT%	RPG	APG	SPG	BPG	PPG
2004–05	Sacramento	45	0	10.1	.385	.200	.655	1.3	.5	.4	.1	2.9
2005–06	Sacramento	72	41	26.6	**.480**	.369	.847	3.6	1.3	.8	.1	10.8
2006–07	Sacramento	**80**	**80**	35.2	.473	.381	.844	4.3	2.2	**1.2**	.1	20.2
2007–08	Sacramento	61	57	36.3	.456	.402	.869	**4.5**	2.1	1.0	.1	23.7
2008–09	Sacramento	51	46	**38.2**	.420	.415	.867	3.6	2.7	**1.2**	**.2**	**24.6**
2009–10	Sacramento	22	21	35.2	.398	.355	.819	4.3	2.6	1.0	**.2**	19.8
2009–10	Houston	24	22	35.8	.435	.310	.924	2.9	2.3	1.0	.1	21.3
2010–11	Houston	**80**	**80**	32.5	.436	.383	.888	3.2	2.5	1.0	**.2**	23.5
2011–12	Houston	40	40	31.6	.413	.347	.894	2.7	**2.8**	.7	.1	17.1
2012–13	Oklahoma City	77	0	27.7	.450	**.426**	.890	2.3	1.4	.9	.1	14.0
2013–14	Minnesota	68	68	32.0	.430	.387	.891	3.0	1.8	1.0	.1	19.1
2014–15	Minnesota	39	36	33.4	.427	.393	.881	3.6	2.3	.8	.0	20.0
2015–16	Minnesota	39	12	21.4	.377	.369	.880	2.1	1.2	.4	.0	10.6
2015–16	San Antonio	16	1	16.3	.353	.333	**.933**	1.8	.8	.6	.1	6.2
Career		714	504	30.2	.437	.384	.870	3.2	1.9	.9	.1	17.4

=== Playoffs ===
Year	Team	GP	GS	MPG	FG%	3P%	FT%	RPG	APG	SPG	BPG	PPG
2006	Sacramento	6	**1**	**32.8**	**.407**	.316	**1.000**	**5.0**	.5	.5	**.3**	13.2
2013	Oklahoma City	**11**	0	29.4	.380	.370	.907	3.1	**1.3**	**.6**	**.3**	**14.0**
2016	San Antonio	5	0	9.8	.400	**.500**	.667	.8	.6	.2	.0	4.4
Career		22	1	25.9	.389	.370	.933	3.1	.9	.5	.2	11.6

== Post-playing career ==
On October 1, 2019, the Brisbane Bullets of the National Basketball League (NBL) announced their new ownership group, which included Martin.

== Personal life ==
In 2007, Martin traveled to Johannesburg, South Africa to participate in the Basketball Without Borders Program and Habitat for Humanity. In June 2010, Martin volunteered to donate money to pay for the funeral of Kasey King-Thomas, a six-year-old boy who died in a school bus accident near Martin's hometown. Martin also voiced his support for an Ohio law requiring seat belts in school buses. Martin married Jill Arnold on July 15, 2011, in Clearwater Beach, Florida.

== See also ==
- List of National Basketball Association career free throw percentage leaders
