= Rick Carlisle =

American basketball coach (born 1959)

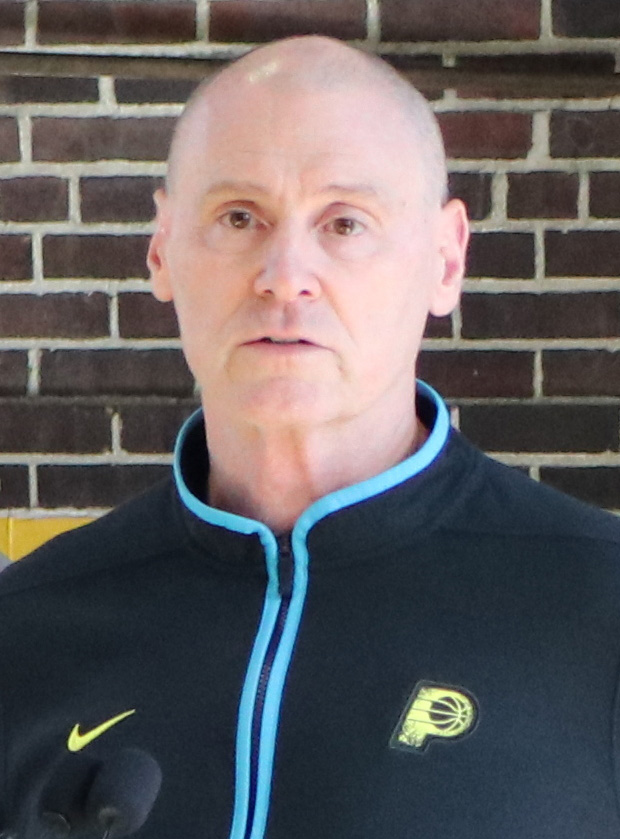
- Carlisle in 2023

Indiana Pacers
- Title: Head coach
- League: NBA

Personal information
- Born: October 27, 1959 (age 67) Ogdensburg, New York, U.S.
- Listed height: 6 ft 5 in (1.96 m)
- Listed weight: 210 lb (95 kg)

Career information
- High school: Lisbon Central (Lisbon, New York); Worcester Academy (Worcester, Massachusetts)
- College: Maine (1979–1981); Virginia (1982–1984)
- NBA draft: 1984: 3rd round, 70th overall pick
- Drafted by: Boston Celtics
- Playing career: 1984–1989
- Position: Shooting guard
- Number: 34, 3, 12
- Coaching career: 1989–present

Career history

Playing
- 1984–1987: Boston Celtics
- 1987: Albany Patroons
- 1987–1988: New York Knicks
- 1989: New Jersey Nets

Coaching
- 1989–1994: New Jersey Nets (assistant)
- 1994–1997: Portland Trail Blazers (assistant)
- 1997–2000: Indiana Pacers (assistant)
- 2001–2003: Detroit Pistons
- 2003–2007: Indiana Pacers
- 2008–2021: Dallas Mavericks
- 2021–present: Indiana Pacers

Career highlights
- As player: NBA champion (1986); As coach: NBA champion (2011); NBA Coach of the Year (2002); NBA All-Star Game head coach (2004)

Career NBA statistics
- Points: 422 (2.2 ppg)
- Rebounds: 141 (0.8 rpg)
- Assists: 201 (1.1 apg)
- Stats at NBA.com
- Stats at Basketball Reference

Rick Preston Carlisle (/ˈkɑːrlaɪl/ KAR-lyle; born October 27, 1959) is an American basketball coach and former player who is the head coach for the Indiana Pacers of the National Basketball Association (NBA). He has previously served as head coach of the Detroit Pistons and Dallas Mavericks, winning the 2011 NBA Finals with the latter. As a player, Carlisle played for the Boston Celtics, New York Knicks, and New Jersey Nets. He is one of only 14 people to win an NBA championship as both a player and a coach, and is one of only 11 head coaches in NBA history to win 1,000 games.

== Playing career ==
Carlisle was raised in Lisbon, New York. He attended and played basketball at Lisbon Central High School and was the first 1,000-point scorer in school history. One of the only NCAA Division I coaches to recruit him was Jim Larrañaga, an assistant coach at America International. However, Carlisle "couldn't face spending four years in downtown Springfield," Massachusetts and chose instead to attend a year of prep school at Worcester Academy.

Carlisle played two years of college basketball at the University of Maine from 1979 to 1981, during which time he reconnected with Larrañaga at the Empire State Games. Larrañaga had since become an assistant coach at the University of Virginia. Carlisle transferred from Maine to Virginia after two seasons. He was a starter for the 1982–83 Virginia Cavaliers team that featured the three-time college player of the year Ralph Sampson. UVA was the number one ranked team in the country prior to being defeated by Chaminade on December 23, 1982. In the 1983 NCAA tournament, UVA was the number one seed in the West and made it to the Elite Eight before losing to eventual NCAA national champion North Carolina State. Carlisle was the co-captain on the 1983–84 Cavaliers team and helped lead them to the Final Four where they lost 49–47 in overtime to the Houston Cougars team led by Hakeem Olajuwon. Carlisle averaged 12.5 points, 3.6 assists, and 3.3 rebounds per game during his college career.

=== NBA ===
After graduating in 1984, Carlisle was selected 70th overall by the Boston Celtics in the 1984 NBA draft, where he played alongside Larry Bird. Under Celtics' coach K. C. Jones, Carlisle won the NBA championship in 1986 and lost in the finals in 1985 and 1987. In the 1986 NBA finals series, in limited playing time, Carlisle made every shot he took (3 for 3).

In a limited reserve role from 1984 to 1987, Carlisle averaged 2.2 points, 1.0 assists and 0.8 rebounds per game. He then played for the Albany Patroons of the Continental Basketball Association (CBA) under Bill Musselman. Carlisle then signed as a free agent with the New York Knicks, where he played under coach Rick Pitino alongside emerging star Patrick Ewing. In 1989, Carlisle played in five games with the New Jersey Nets under Bill Fitch.

== Coaching career ==
Later in 1989, Carlisle accepted an assistant coaching position with the New Jersey Nets, where he spent five seasons under Bill Fitch and Chuck Daly. In 1994, he joined the assistant coaching staff with the Portland Trail Blazers under coach P. J. Carlesimo, where he spent three seasons.

In 1997, Carlisle joined the Indiana Pacers organization as an assistant coach under former teammate Larry Bird. During his time as assistant coach, he helped the Pacers to two of their best seasons ever. First, in 1997–98, the Pacers stretched the Chicago Bulls to the limit, narrowly losing the deciding seventh game of the Eastern Conference Finals to the eventual NBA champion. Then, in 1999–2000 season, the Pacers made the NBA Finals for the first time, ultimately losing to the Los Angeles Lakers. Bird stepped down as coach and pushed for Carlisle to be selected as his replacement, but Pacers' team president Donnie Walsh gave the job to Isiah Thomas.

=== Detroit Pistons (2001–2003) ===
For the 2001–02 season, Carlisle was hired by the Detroit Pistons to be their new head coach. In two seasons as head coach, he led the team to consecutive 50–32 records (.610) with Central Division titles and playoff appearances. Carlisle was named Coach of the Year in 2002. However, the Pistons fired Carlisle after the 2002–03 season with a year remaining on his contract and hired Larry Brown. Friction between Carlisle and team ownership was cited as one of the primary reasons for the firing. Carlisle's Pistons had just dispatched Brown's Philadelphia 76ers in the Eastern Conference semifinals before being swept by the New Jersey Nets in the Eastern Conference finals.

=== Indiana Pacers (2003–2007) ===
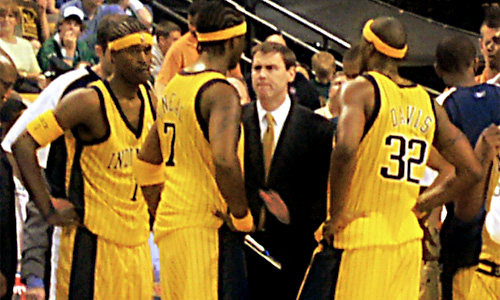
Carlisle in 2005

For the 2003–04 season, Carlisle returned to the Pacers as head coach to replace Isiah Thomas, who had been fired almost immediately after Larry Bird was brought back as the new President of Basketball Operations. In his first season, Carlisle led the Pacers to the Central Division title and NBA's best regular-season record at 61–21 (74.4%), setting a franchise record for wins (both in the NBA and ABA). In the playoffs, the team eliminated the Boston Celtics and Miami Heat before losing to the Detroit Pistons in the Eastern Conference finals. That year, Carlisle coached the East All-Stars at the All-Star Game.

In 2005, the Pacers roster was decimated by injuries, most notably, those of Jermaine O'Neal, Stephen Jackson and Jamaal Tinsley, and suspensions from the Pacers–Pistons brawl at The Palace of Auburn Hills, which resulted in Ron Artest being suspended for the rest of the season, Jackson being suspended for 30 games, and O'Neal being suspended for 15 games. The Pacers still made the NBA playoffs that season. As the sixth seed, they again defeated the Boston Celtics in the first round before being defeated again by the eventual Eastern Conference champion, the Detroit Pistons.

The Pacers slipped to a .500 record in 2005–06 and barely made the playoffs, losing in the first round. Despite this, Bird and Pacers CEO Donnie Walsh did not hold Carlisle responsible for the Pacers' lackluster performances in the past two seasons, signing him to a multiyear contract extension and giving him the title of executive vice president of basketball operations.

After the Pacers finished the 2006–07 season with a 35–47 record, missing the playoffs for the first time since 1997, Bird fired Carlisle. Carlisle understood the decision, saying that the Pacers needed "a new voice". In four seasons with the Pacers, he compiled a 181–147 record. The Pacers offered to let Carlisle stay on in the front office, but Carlisle also resigned that post on June 12, 2007.

After leaving Indiana, Carlisle worked as a studio analyst for ESPN before signing with the Dallas Mavericks as the team's new head coach.

=== Dallas Mavericks (2008–2021) ===
==== 2008–2018: Dirk Nowitzki era ====
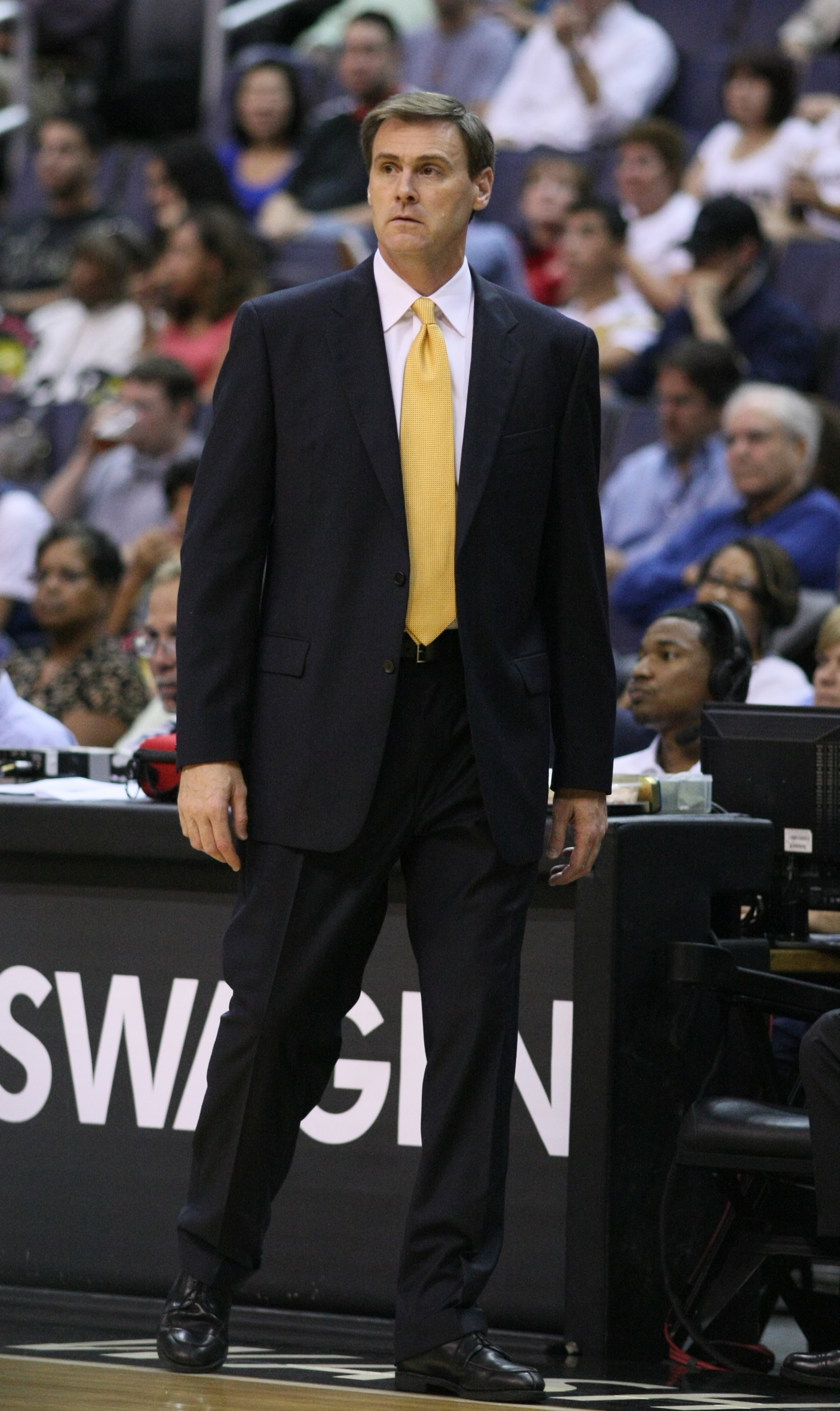
Carlisle in 2009

On May 9, 2008, Carlisle signed a four-year deal with the Dallas Mavericks, replacing Avery Johnson.

In the regular season, the Mavericks finished with a record of 50–32. In the playoffs, the team pulled off a first round upset win against the San Antonio Spurs, then lost to the Denver Nuggets 1–4 in the Western Conference semifinals.

The next year, Carlisle coached the Mavericks to a 55–27 record, first in Southwest Division and second in the Western Conference, but lost in the first round to the Spurs in the 2010 playoffs.

===== 2010–11 season: NBA championship =====
The 2010–11 season was Carlisle's most successful as a head coach. To strengthen the team, Dallas acquired Tyson Chandler, Peja Stojaković, Corey Brewer, J.J Barea and Ian Mahinmi. An existing core of Dirk Nowitzki, Jason Terry, Shawn Marion, Caron Butler, and Jason Kidd, the team had clear championship aspirations. To start the season, Dallas won 16 of its first 20 games in a competitive Western Conference. They finished the regular season with a 57–25 record.

In the first round, the Mavericks beat the Portland Trail Blazers 4–2. On May 8, 2011, they swept the two-time defending champion Los Angeles Lakers in the Western Conference semifinals. On May 25, 2011, the Mavericks earned a 4–1 series win over the Oklahoma City Thunder in the Western Conference finals. This marked Carlisle's first conference finals victory of his head coaching career, leading to his first NBA Finals appearance.

In the 2011 NBA Finals, Carlisle coached the Mavericks to a 4–2 series victory over the Miami Heat for the franchise's first championship.

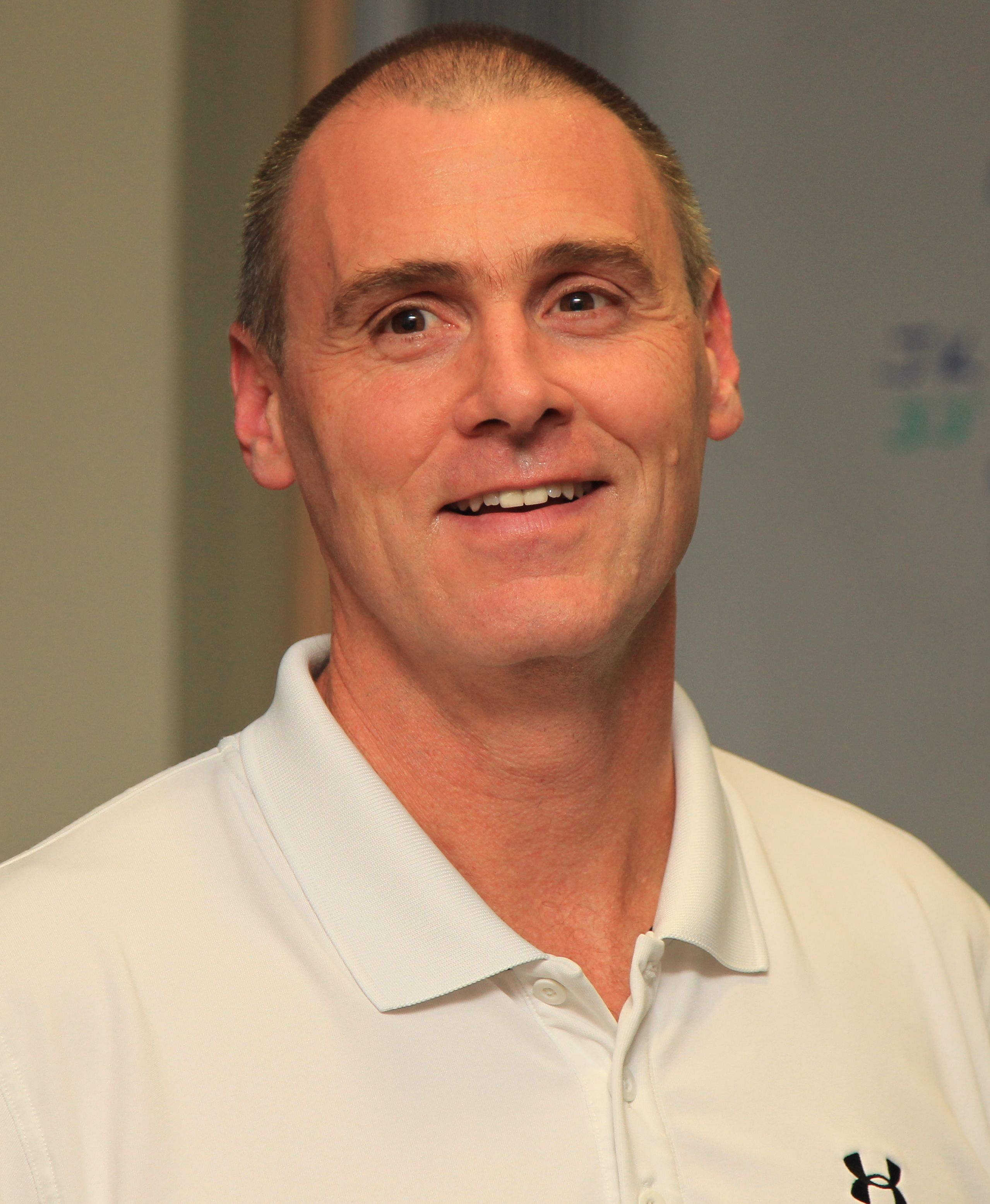
Carlisle in 2011

===== 2012–2018: Post-championship success =====
In the 2012 playoffs, the Mavericks were swept by the Oklahoma City Thunder in the first round. In May 2012, Carlisle agreed to a new four-year deal with the Mavericks.

In 2013, the Mavericks finished 41–41 and missed the playoffs for the first time since 2000.

In 2014, Carlisle led the Mavericks back to the playoffs as the eighth seed with a 49–33 record where they would meet the San Antonio Spurs in the first round. The Mavericks lost in seven games and the Spurs went on to win the 2014 NBA Finals.

In 2015, the Mavericks finished 50–32, but were defeated in five games by the Houston Rockets in the first round.

On January 30, 2015, Carlisle recorded his 600th win in a game against the Miami Heat. On November 1, 2015, Carlisle recorded his 340th win as Mavericks coach, passing Don Nelson as the winningest coach in franchise history. Four days later, Carlisle signed a new five-year deal with Dallas on November 5.

In 2016, the Mavericks finished sixth in the Western Conference, but were defeated in five games by the Oklahoma City Thunder.

On December 2, 2017, Carlisle recorded his 700th win in a game against the Los Angeles Clippers.

==== 2018–2021: Luka Dončić era ====
During the 2018 NBA draft, the Mavericks traded for Luka Dončić and drafted a second round standout Jalen Brunson. In 2019, the team acquired Tim Hardaway Jr. and Kristaps Porziņģis. In 2020, the Mavericks made the playoffs for the first time in three years as the 7th seed in the conference, losing in six games to the Los Angeles Clippers.

On January 13, 2021, Carlisle recorded his 800th win in a game against the Charlotte Hornets.

In 2021, the Mavericks made the playoffs for the second consecutive year, again set to play the Los Angeles Clippers. This year, the Mavericks entered as the 5th seed in the Western Conference and as division champions but lost in seven games to the Clippers.

On June 17, 2021, Carlisle stepped down as the Mavericks' head coach with two years remaining on his contract.

=== Indiana Pacers (2021–present) ===
On June 24, 2021, Carlisle was hired as the head coach of the Indiana Pacers, returning to the franchise for a third stint and his second as head coach. His contract was a reported $29 million over four years.

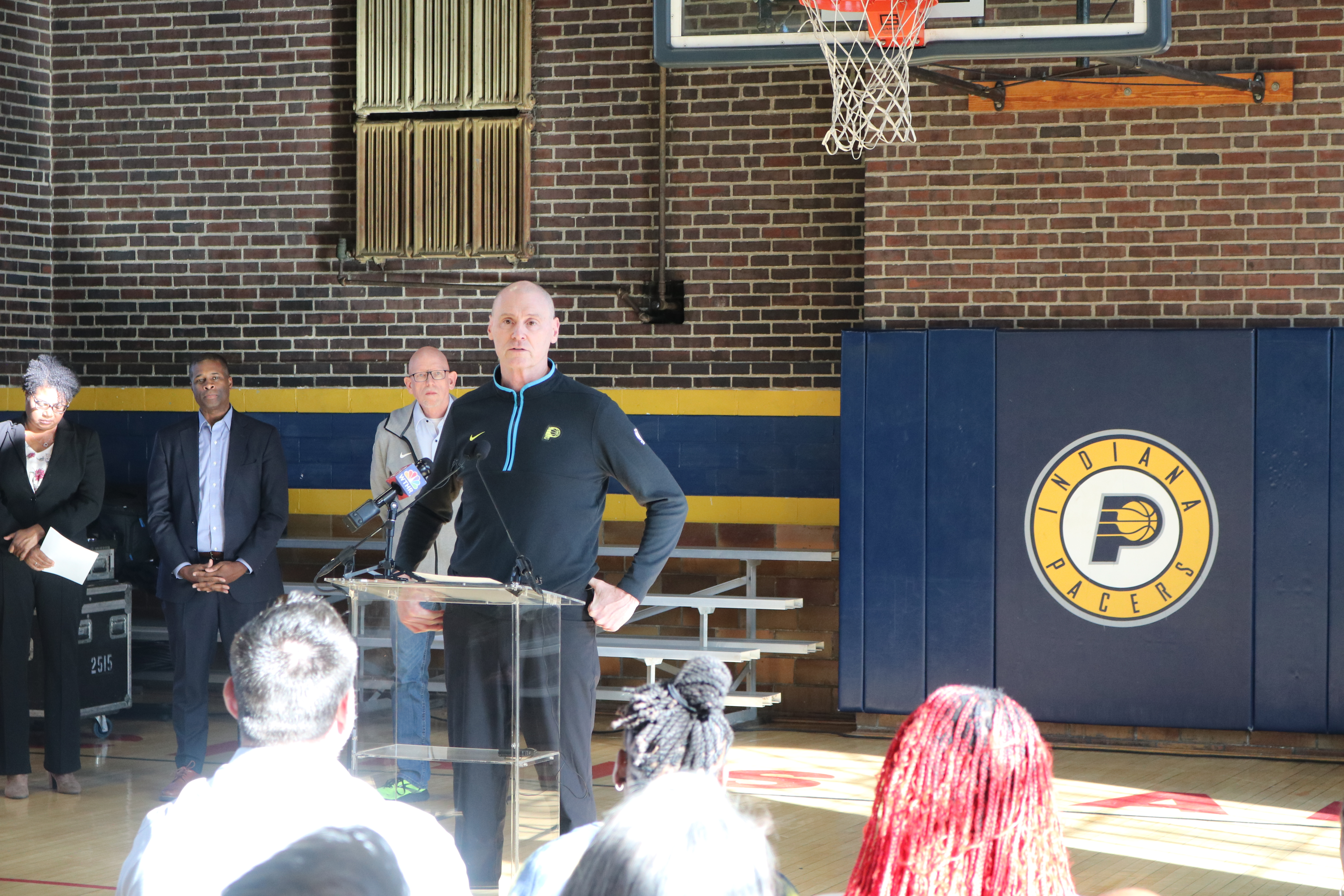
Carlisle with the Pacers during an Office of Public Health and Safety (OPHS) event in November 2023

Upon Carlisle's arrival in Indiana, the team began a rebuild, departing from core players Domantas Sabonis, Malcolm Brogdon, Caris LeVert, T.J. Warren, Jeremy Lamb, Justin Holiday, and Torrey Craig. During this period, the Pacers received young rising superstar Tyrese Haliburton, who Carlisle referred to as "an elite young point guard that affects the game positively in many, many ways." In addition, the team acquired multiple first–round draft picks, sharpshooter Buddy Hield, Daniel Theis, and Tristan Thompson. With their numerous draft picks, the team selected Bennedict Mathurin, Jarace Walker, Andrew Nembhard, Chris Duarte, Isaiah Jackson, and Ben Sheppard. The Pacers missed the 2022 and 2023 NBA playoffs with a combined 60–104 record.

On October 26, 2023, Carlisle agreed to a multiyear contract extension with Indiana, extending beyond the 2024–25 season.

On November 6, 2023, Carlisle recorded his 900th win in a 41-point blowout win over the San Antonio Spurs.

==== 2024–present: Playoff success and finals run ====
In 2024, after a two-year rebuilding process and acquiring Pascal Siakam, Carlisle's 2023–24 Pacers finished with a 47–35 record as the sixth seed, qualifying for the 2024 NBA playoffs and reaching the conference finals, where they were swept by the eventual 2024 NBA Finals champion Boston Celtics. On May 10, 2024, Carlisle was fined $35,000 for public criticism of the officiating and questioning the integrity of the league and its officials during their series win over the New York Knicks.

In 2025, the Pacers returned to the playoffs as the fourth seed, improving to a 50–32 record, the franchise's first 50-win season since 2013–14. The Pacers again reached the conference finals, the first time the team had reached consecutive conference finals since the 2012–13 and 2013–14 seasons. He subsequently led them to the 2025 NBA Finals, the team's first finals appearance since 2000. In game 1 of the finals, the Pacers overcame a 15-point deficit in the fourth quarter after a timeout by Carlisle to beat the Oklahoma City Thunder. The feat was tied for the largest overcome fourth-quarter deficit in a finals match since the Dallas Mavericks, who at that time were also coached by Carlisle, rallied and won against the Miami Heat in game 2 of the 2011 Finals. The Pacers eventually lost in 7 games.

On August 19, 2025, Carlisle agreed to a multiyear contract extension with the Pacers. On January 8, 2026, Carlisle recorded his 1,000 win, becoming the 11th coach in NBA history to accomplish this milestone, after defeating the Hornets. This came on the heels of a 13-game losing streak.

== Personal life ==
Carlisle married pediatrician Dr. Donna Nobile in 2000. They have a daughter, born c. 2005. Carlisle is an avid pianist and private pilot, who as of September 2015 had logged nearly 200 hours flying his Cirrus SR22T single-engine light aircraft.

== Career statistics ==
Legend
GP	Games played	GS	Games started	MPG	Minutes per game
FG%	Field goal percentage	3P%	3-point field goal percentage	FT%	Free throw percentage
RPG	Rebounds per game	APG	Assists per game	SPG	Steals per game
BPG	Blocks per game	PPG	Points per game	**Bold**	Career high
†	Won an NBA championship

=== Regular season ===
Year	Team	GP	GS	MPG	FG%	3P%	FT%	RPG	APG	SPG	BPG	PPG
1984–85	Boston	38	0	4.7	.388	.000	.882	.6	.7	.1	.0	1.8
1985–86†	Boston	**77**	**1**	**9.9**	**.487**	.000	.652	**1.0**	**1.4**	.2	.1	2.6
1986–87	Boston	42	0	7.1	.326	.313	.750	.7	.8	.2	.0	1.9
1987–88	New York	26	0	7.8	.433	**.353**	**.909**	.5	1.2	**.4**	**.2**	**2.8**
1989–90	New Jersey	5	0	4.2	.143	.000	—	.0	1.0	.2	**.2**	.4
Career		188	1	7.8	.422	.229	.775	.8	1.1	.2	.0	2.2

=== Playoffs ===
Year	Team	GP	GS	MPG	FG%	3P%	FT%	RPG	APG	SPG	BPG	PPG
1986†	Boston	**10**	0	**5.4**	**.533**	—	**.750**	.5	**.8**	.2	.0	**1.9**
1988	New York	2	0	4.0	.250	.000	—	**1.0**	.0	**.5**	.0	1.0
Career		12	0	5.2	.474	.000	.750	.6	.7	.3	.0	1.8

== Head coaching record ==
Legend
Regular season	G	Games coached	W	Games won	L	Games lost	W–L %	Win–loss %
Playoffs	PG	Playoff games	PW	Playoff wins	PL	Playoff losses	PW–L %	Playoff win–loss %

Team	Year	G	W	L	W–L%	Finish	PG	PW	PL	PW–L%	Result
Detroit	2001–02	82	50	32	.610	1st in Central	10	4	6	.400	Lost in conference semifinals
Detroit	2002–03	82	50	32	.610	1st in Central	17	8	9	.471	Lost in conference finals
Indiana	2003–04	82	61	21	.744	1st in Central	16	10	6	.625	Lost in conference finals
Indiana	2004–05	82	44	38	.537	3rd in Central	13	6	7	.462	Lost in conference semifinals
Indiana	2005–06	82	41	41	.500	3rd in Central	6	2	4	.333	Lost in first round
Indiana	2006–07	82	35	47	.427	4th in Central	—	—	—	—	Missed playoffs
Dallas	2008–09	82	50	32	.610	3rd in Southwest	10	5	5	.500	Lost in conference semifinals
Dallas	2009–10	82	55	27	.671	1st in Southwest	6	2	4	.333	Lost in first round
Dallas	2010–11	82	57	25	.695	2nd in Southwest	21	16	5	.762	Won NBA championship
Dallas	2011–12	66	36	30	.545	3rd in Southwest	4	0	4	.000	Lost in first round
Dallas	2012–13	82	41	41	.500	4th in Southwest	—	—	—	—	Missed playoffs
Dallas	2013–14	82	49	33	.598	4th in Southwest	7	3	4	.429	Lost in first round
Dallas	2014–15	82	50	32	.610	3rd in Southwest	5	1	4	.200	Lost in first round
Dallas	2015–16	82	42	40	.512	2nd in Southwest	5	1	4	.200	Lost in first round
Dallas	2016–17	82	33	49	.402	4th in Southwest	—	—	—	—	Missed playoffs
Dallas	2017–18	82	24	58	.293	4th in Southwest	—	—	—	—	Missed playoffs
Dallas	2018–19	82	33	49	.402	5th in Southwest	—	—	—	—	Missed playoffs
Dallas	2019–20	75	43	32	.573	2nd in Southwest	6	2	4	.333	Lost in first round
Dallas	2020–21	72	42	30	.583	1st in Southwest	7	3	4	.429	Lost in first round
Indiana	2021–22	82	25	57	.305	4th in Central	—	—	—	—	Missed playoffs
Indiana	2022–23	82	35	47	.427	4th in Central	—	—	—	—	Missed playoffs
Indiana	2023–24	82	47	35	.573	3rd in Central	17	8	9	.471	Lost in conference finals
Indiana	2024–25	82	50	32	.610	2nd in Central	23	15	8	.652	Lost in NBA Finals
Indiana	2025–26	82	19	63	.232	5th in Central	—	—	—	—	Missed playoffs
Career		1,935	1,012	923	.523		173	86	87	.497	
