= 2010–11 Dallas Mavericks season =

National Basketball Association season

- NBA champions
- Conference champions
- Head coach: Rick Carlisle
- President: Donnie Nelson
- General manager: Donnie Nelson
- Owner: Mark Cuban
- Arena: American Airlines Center

Results
- Record: 57–25 (.695)
- Place: Division: 2nd (Southwest); Conference: 3rd (Western)
- Playoff finish: NBA champions (Defeated Heat 4–2)
- Stats at Basketball Reference

Local media
- Television: FS Southwest; KTXA
- Radio: KESN

The 2010–11 Dallas Mavericks season was the 31st season of the franchise in the National Basketball Association (NBA).

This season would prove to be the most successful season for the Mavericks. In the playoffs, the Mavericks defeated the Portland Trail Blazers in six games in the first round, then swept the defending two-time NBA champion Los Angeles Lakers in four games in the semi-finals, before defeating the Oklahoma City Thunder in five games in the Conference Finals to reach the NBA Finals for the first time since 2006. In the NBA Finals, the Mavericks faced off against the Miami Heat in a rematch of the 2006 NBA Finals, and the Heat were led by their Big Three of LeBron James, Dwyane Wade, and Chris Bosh. The Mavericks would go on to defeat the Heat in six games in the NBA Finals, winning their first NBA championship in franchise history. This would be their last playoff series win until 2022.

The Mavericks' championship was the first major sports championship in the Dallas-Fort Worth area since the Dallas Stars in 1999, and the first title in Mavericks franchise history. The Mavericks became the third team to win an NBA title in the state of Texas, joining the Houston Rockets and San Antonio Spurs. The Mavericks were the third team to win a major sports championship in the Dallas-Fort Worth area, joining the Dallas Cowboys and the Dallas Stars. The Mavericks championship parade was held on June 16, 2011, in downtown Dallas. Following the season, Peja Stojakovic retired after 13 seasons.

== Key dates ==
- June 24 – The 2010 NBA draft was held in New York City.
- July 1 – The free agency period began.

== Transactions ==
=== Summary ===
In the 2010 NBA Draft the Mavericks selected Nigerian center Solomon Alabi with the 20th pick in the second round(50th overall) who was traded directly to the Toronto Raptors for a future second-round pick and cash considerations.

The Mavericks sent $3 million to the Memphis Grizzlies to acquire the rights for shooting guard Dominique Jones.

Mavericks free agent Dirk Nowitzki agreed to a 4-year deal worth $80 million to stay with the Mavericks.

Brendan Haywood also decided to stay with the Mavericks as he signed a new 6-year deal worth $55 million. His sixth and last year in this contract is however not fully guaranteed.

Center Ian Mahinmi signed a 2-year deal worth the veteran minimum starting at $850,000.

On July 13, the Mavericks officially signed rookie Dominique Jones.

The Mavericks and the Charlotte Bobcats agreed on a trade that sent Erick Dampier, Matt Carroll and Eduardo Nájera to the Bobcats, while the Bobcats sent Tyson Chandler and Alexis Ajinça to the Mavericks.

On August 12 Tim Thomas signed a 1-year deal to the veteran minimum ($1.35 million). He was rostered the previous season, but left the team to take care of his ill wife. Later, Thomas announced that the illness his wife was suffering from would prevent him from playing for the Mavericks.

=== NBA draft ===
Round	Pick	Player	Position	Nationality	College/team
1	25	Dominique Jones (acquired from Memphis)	SG	United States	USF
2	50	Solomon Alabi (traded to Toronto)	C	Nigeria	Florida State

=== Trades ===
June 24, 2010
To Dallas Mavericks

- No. 25 pick (Dominique Jones)
To Memphis Grizzlies

- Cash considerations
June 24, 2010
To Dallas Mavericks

- Future second-round pick,
  cash considerations
To Toronto Raptors

- No. 50 pick (Solomon Alabi)
July 13, 2010
To Dallas Mavericks

- (United States) Tyson Chandler
  (France) Alexis Ajinça
To Charlotte Bobcats

- (United States) Erick Dampier
  (United States) Matt Carroll
  (Mexico) Eduardo Nájera
  cash considerations
January 24, 2011
To Dallas Mavericks

- Future second-round pick
To Toronto Raptors

- (France) Alexis Ajinça,
  cash considerations

=== Free agents ===
==== Additions ====
Player	Signed	Former Team
Brendan Haywood	Signed 6-year contract for $55 Million	Dallas Mavericks
Dirk Nowitzki	Signed 4-year contract for $80 Million	Dallas Mavericks
Ian Mahinmi	Signed 2-year contract for $8.5 Million	San Antonio Spurs
Peja Stojaković		Toronto Raptors
Corey Brewer	Signed 3-year contract for $7.5 Million	Minnesota Timberwolves

On January 10, the Mavericks signed Sasha Pavlović to a 10-day contract. He received a second 10-day contract on January 20. On January 30 he was released.

The Mavericks signed Peja Stojaković on January 24, 2011.

Corey Brewer was signed on March 3, 2011.

==== Subtractions ====
Player	Reason Left	New Team
Steve Novak	Waived	

On January 5, the Mavericks waived Steve Novak before his contract became fully guaranteed.

== Roster ==
2010–11 Dallas Mavericks roster
Players

Pos.	No.	Player	Height	Weight	DOB	From
G	11	José Juan Barea	5 ft 10 in (1.78 m)	175 lb (79 kg)	June 26, 1984	Northeastern
G	3	Rodrigue Beaubois	6 ft 2 in (1.88 m)	185 lb (84 kg)	February 24, 1988	France
F	13	Corey Brewer	6 ft 9 in (2.06 m)	185 lb (84 kg)	March 5, 1986	Florida
F	4	Caron Butler	6 ft 7 in (2.01 m)	228 lb (103 kg)	March 13, 1980	Connecticut
F	35	Brian Cardinal	6 ft 8 in (2.03 m)	240 lb (109 kg)	May 2, 1977	Purdue
C	6	Tyson Chandler	7 ft 1 in (2.16 m)	235 lb (107 kg)	October 2, 1982	Dominguez HS (CA)
C	33	Brendan Haywood	7 ft 0 in (2.13 m)	263 lb (119 kg)	November 27, 1979	North Carolina
G	20	Dominique Jones	6 ft 4 in (1.93 m)	215 lb (98 kg)	October 15, 1988	South Florida
G	2	Jason Kidd	6 ft 4 in (1.93 m)	210 lb (95 kg)	March 23, 1973	California
C	28	Ian Mahinmi	6 ft 11 in (2.11 m)	230 lb (104 kg)	November 5, 1986	France
F	0	Shawn Marion	6 ft 7 in (2.01 m)	228 lb (103 kg)	May 7, 1978	UNLV
F	41	Dirk Nowitzki	7 ft 0 in (2.13 m)	245 lb (111 kg)	June 19, 1978	Germany
G	92	DeShawn Stevenson	6 ft 5 in (1.96 m)	218 lb (99 kg)	April 3, 1981	Washington Union High School (CA)
F	16	Peja Stojaković	6 ft 10 in (2.08 m)	229 lb (104 kg)	June 9, 1977	Serbia
G	31	Jason Terry	6 ft 2 in (1.88 m)	180 lb (82 kg)	September 15, 1977	Arizona

Players who left during the season
Pos.	#	Name	Height	Weight	DOB (Y–M–D)	From
C	8	Alexis Ajinça	7 ft 0 in (2.13 m)	220 lb (100 kg)	May 6, 1988	France
F	21	Steve Novak	6 ft 10 in (2.08 m)	220 lb (100 kg)	June 13, 1983	Marquette
G/F	7	Sasha Pavlović	6 ft 8 in (2.03 m)	220 lb (100 kg)	November 15, 1983	Serbia

Coaches
Head coach
- Rick Carlisle
Assistant(s)
- Terry Stotts
- Dwane Casey
- Darrell Armstrong
- Monte Mathis
- Robert Hackett

Legend
- (DP) Unsigned draft pick
- (FA) Free agent
- (S) Suspended
- Injured

== Pre-season ==
=== Game log ===
2010 pre-season game log
Pre-season: 4–4 (home: 2–2; road: 2–2)

Game	Date	Team	Score	High points	High rebounds	High assists	Location Attendance	Record
1	October 5	Washington	L 94–97	Jason Terry (15)	Tyson Chandler (9)	Jason Kidd (5)	American Airlines Center; 15,546	0–1
2	October 7	Chicago	W 88–83	Dirk Nowitzki (30)	Dirk Nowitzki (10)	Jason Terry (4)	American Airlines Center; 17,448	1–1
3	October 9	@ Phoenix	L 90–98	José Juan Barea (13)	Caron Butler (7)	Dee Brown, Jason Kidd (4)	Indian Wells Tennis Garden; 15,617	1–2
4	October 11	Cleveland	L 79–85	Dirk Nowitzki (15)	Brendan Haywood (8)	José Juan Barea (7)	American Airlines Center; 16,673	1–3
5	October 13	@ Detroit	W 101–96	Steve Novak (22)	Tyson Chandler (7)	Dominique Jones, Jason Terry (7)	Van Andel Arena; 10,207	2–3
6	October 15	@ Chicago	W 109–105 (OT)	Dirk Nowitzki (24)	Brendan Haywood (10)	Jason Kidd (8)	United Center; 21,125	3–3
7	October 20	@ Orlando	L 76–101	Caron Butler (15)	Dirk Nowitzki (7)	José Juan Barea (8)	Amway Center; 18,846	3–4
8	October 22	Houston	W 97–96	Caron Butler (25)	Brendan Haywood, Shawn Marion (9)	Jason Kidd (9)	American Airlines Center; 18,580	4–4

2010–11 season schedule

== Regular season ==
=== Standings ===
Southwest Division	W	L	PCT	GB	Home	Road	Div
c-San Antonio Spurs	61	21	.744	–	36–5	25–16	10–6
x-Dallas Mavericks	57	25	.695	4	29–12	28–13	8–8
x-New Orleans Hornets	46	36	.561	15	28–13	18–23	9–7
x-Memphis Grizzlies	46	36	.561	15	30–11	16–25	8–8
Houston Rockets	43	39	.524	18	25–16	18–23	5–11

#	Western Conference				
#	Team	W	L	PCT	GB
1	c-San Antonio Spurs	61	21	.744	–
2	y-Los Angeles Lakers	57	25	.695	4
3	x-Dallas Mavericks	57	25	.695	4
4	y-Oklahoma City Thunder	55	27	.671	6
5	x-Denver Nuggets	50	32	.610	11
6	x-Portland Trail Blazers	48	34	.585	13
7	x-New Orleans Hornets	46	36	.561	15
8	x-Memphis Grizzlies	46	36	.561	15
9	Houston Rockets	43	39	.524	18
10	Phoenix Suns	40	42	.488	21
11	Utah Jazz	39	43	.476	22
12	Golden State Warriors	36	46	.439	25
13	Los Angeles Clippers	32	50	.390	29
14	Sacramento Kings	24	58	.293	37
15	Minnesota Timberwolves	17	65	.207	44

=== Game log ===
2010–11 game log
Total: 57–25 (Home: 29–12; Road: 28–13)
October: 2–1 (home: 1–1; road: 1–0)

Game	Date	Team	Score	High points	High rebounds	High assists	Location Attendance	Record
1	October 27	Charlotte	W 101–86	Dirk Nowitzki (28)	Dirk Nowitzki (13)	Jason Kidd (18)	American Airlines Center; 19,440	1–0
2	October 29	Memphis	L 90–91	Dirk Nowitzki (27)	Tyson Chandler (9)	Jason Kidd (10)	American Airlines Center; 20,060	1–1
3	October 31	@ LA Clippers	W 99–83	Caron Butler (17)	Jason Kidd (9)	Jason Kidd (7)	Staples Center; 13,718	2–1

November: 11–3 (home: 6–2; road: 5–1)

Game	Date	Team	Score	High points	High rebounds	High assists	Location Attendance	Record
4	November 3	@ Denver	W 102–101	Dirk Nowitzki (35)	Dirk Nowitzki (12)	Jason Kidd (12)	Pepsi Center; 14,159	3–1
5	November 6	Denver	L 92–103	Jason Terry (26)	Caron Butler (10)	Jason Kidd (7)	American Airlines Center; 19,948	3–2
6	November 8	Boston	W 89–87	Dirk Nowitzki (25)	Tyson Chandler (13)	Jason Kidd (10)	American Airlines Center; 20,194	4–2
7	November 10	@ Memphis	W 106–91	Jason Terry (25)	Dirk Nowitzki (10)	Jason Kidd (12)	FedExForum; 10,767	5–2
8	November 12	Philadelphia	W 99–90	José Juan Barea (19)	Brendan Haywood (17)	Jason Kidd (8)	American Airlines Center; 19,989	6–2
9	November 15	New Orleans	W 98–95	Jason Terry (26)	Dirk Nowitzki (10)	Jason Kidd (6)	American Airlines Center; 19,712	7–2
10	November 17	@ New Orleans	L 97–99	Dirk Nowitzki (29)	Dirk Nowitzki (9)	Jason Kidd (8)	New Orleans Arena; 13,828	7–3
11	November 19	Chicago	L 83–88	Dirk Nowitzki (36)	Tyson Chandler (10)	Jason Terry (8)	American Airlines Center; 20,133	7–4
12	November 20	@ Atlanta	W 98–93	Dirk Nowitzki (21)	Shawn Marion (10)	Jason Kidd (9)	Philips Arena; 14,143	8–4
13	November 23	Detroit	W 88–84	Dirk Nowitzki (42)	Dirk Nowitzki (12)	Jason Kidd (10)	American Airlines Center; 19,734	9–4
14	November 24	@ Oklahoma	W 111–103	Dirk Nowitzki (32)	Tyson Chandler (18)	Jason Kidd (12)	Ford Center; 18,203	10–4
15	November 26	@ San Antonio	W 103–94	Dirk Nowitzki (26)	Tyson Chandler; Dirk Nowitzki (8)	José Juan Barea (7)	AT&T Center; 18,581	11–4
16	November 27	Miami	W 106–95	Caron Butler (23)	Tyson Chandler (17)	Jason Kidd (13)	American Airlines Center; 20,536	12–4
17	November 29	Houston	W 101–91	Dirk Nowitzki (20)	Shawn Marion; Dirk Nowitzki (10)	Jason Kidd (11)	American Airlines Center; 19,435	13–4

December : 11–3 (home: 6–3; road: 5–0)

Game	Date	Team	Score	High points	High rebounds	High assists	Location Attendance	Record
18	December 1	Minnesota	W 100–86	Shawn Marion (16)	Tyson Chandler (18)	Jason Terry (7)	American Airlines Center; 19,567	14–4
19	December 3	@ Utah	W 93–81	Dirk Nowitzki (26)	Tyson Chandler (8)	Jason Terry (7)	EnergySolutions Arena; 19,623	15–4
20	December 4	@ Sacramento	W 105–103	Dirk Nowitzki (25)	Shawn Marion (8)	José Juan Barea (6)	ARCO Arena; 12,900	16–4
21	December 7	Golden State	W 105–100	Dirk Nowitzki (25)	Ian Mahinmi (10)	Jason Kidd (7)	American Airlines Center; 19,593	17–4
22	December 9	New Jersey	W 102–89	Dirk Nowitzki (12)	Dirk Nowitzki (10)	José Juan Barea (13)	American Airlines Center; 19,666	18–4
23	December 11	Utah	W 103–97	Dirk Nowitzki (31)	Dirk Nowitzki (15)	Jason Kidd (9)	American Airlines Center; 20,074	19–4
24	December 13	Milwaukee	L 99–103	Dirk Nowitzki (30)	Tyson Chandler (9)	Jason Kidd (10)	American Airlines Center; 19,720	19–5
25	December 15	Portland	W 103–98	Caron Butler (23)	Tyson Chandler (8)	Jason Kidd (6)	American Airlines Center; 19,531	20–5
26	December 17	Phoenix	W 106–91	Dirk Nowitzki, Jason Terry (18)	Tyson Chandler (12)	Jason Kidd (8)	American Airlines Center; 20,406	21–5
27	December 20	@ Miami	W 98–96	Dirk Nowitzki (26)	Shawn Marion (13)	Jason Kidd (7)	American Airlines Arena; 20,178	22–5
28	December 21	@ Orlando	W 105–99	Caron Butler (20)	Dirk Nowitzki (8)	Jason Kidd (12)	Amway Center; 19,057	23–5
29	December 27	@ Oklahoma City	W 103–93	Caron Butler (21)	Tyson Chandler (10)	Jason Kidd (10)	Oklahoma City Arena; 18,203	24–5
30	December 28	Toronto	L 76–84	Jason Terry (18)	Tyson Chandler, Jason Kidd (6)	Jason Terry (6)	American Airlines Center; 20,027	24–6
31	December 30	San Antonio	L 93–99	Caron Butler (30)	Tyson Chandler (11)	Jason Kidd (13)	American Airlines Center; 20,604	24–7

January: 8–8 (home: 6–2; road: 2–6)

Game	Date	Team	Score	High points	High rebounds	High assists	Location Attendance	Record
32	January 1	@ Milwaukee	L 87–99	José Juan Barea (29)	Jason Kidd (7)	Jason Kidd (9)	Bradley Center; 13,194	24–8
33	January 2	@ Cleveland	W 104–95	Shawn Marion (22)	Tyson Chandler (14)	Jason Kidd (8)	Quicken Loans Arena; 20,562	25–8
34	January 4	Portland	W 84–81	DeShawn Stevenson, Jason Terry (18)	Tyson Chandler (13)	Jason Kidd (8)	American Airlines Center; 19,514	26–8
35	January 6	Oklahoma City	L 95–99	Shawn Marion (25)	Tyson Chandler (18)	Jason Kidd (7)	American Airlines Center; 20,282	26–9
36	January 8	Orlando	L 107–117	DeShawn Stevenson (24)	Shawn Marion (8)	Jason Terry (9)	American Airlines Center; 20,178	26–10
37	January 12	@ Indiana	L 89–102	Jason Terry (18)	Tyson Chandler (9)	Jason Kidd (7)	Conseco Fieldhouse; 11,204	26–11
38	January 14	@ San Antonio	L 89–101	Shawn Marion (14)	Shawn Marion (10)	José Juan Barea (5)	AT&T Center; 18,581	26–12
39	January 15	@ Memphis	L 70–89	Ian Mahinmi (17)	four players (6)	Jason Kidd (4)	FedExForum; 15,812	26–13
40	January 17	@ Detroit	L 89–103	Dirk Nowitzki (32)	Brendan Haywood, Shawn Marion (7)	Jason Kidd (13)	The Palace of Auburn Hills; 12,660	26–14
41	January 19	LA Lakers	W 109–100	Shawn Marion, Jason Terry (22)	Tyson Chandler (10)	Jason Kidd (10)	American Airlines Center; 20,365	27–14
42	January 20	@ Chicago	L 77–82	Dirk Nowitzki (19)	Tyson Chandler (12)	Dirk Nowitzki, Jason Terry (4)	United Center; 21,397	27–15
43	January 22	@ New Jersey	W 87–86	Dirk Nowitzki (23)	Shawn Marion (11)	Jason Kidd (8)	Prudential Center; 14,051	28–15
44	January 25	LA Clippers	W 112–105	Jason Terry (28)	Shawn Marion (10)	Jason Kidd (7)	American Airlines Center; 20,335	29–15
45	January 27	Houston	W 111–106	Tyson Chandler (21)	Tyson Chandler (15)	Jason Kidd (10)	American Airlines Center; 20,088	30–15
46	January 29	Atlanta	W 102–91	Dirk Nowitzki (19)	Jason Kidd (8)	Jason Terry (11)	American Airlines Center; 20,309	31–15
47	January 31	Washington	W 102–92	Dirk Nowitzki (24)	Tyson Chandler (18)	Jason Kidd (11)	American Airlines Center; 19,724	32–15

February: 10–1 (home: 3–0; road: 7–1)

Game	Date	Team	Score	High points	High rebounds	High assists	Location Attendance	Record
48	February 2	@ New York	W 113–97	Dirk Nowitzki (29)	Tyson Chandler, Dirk Nowitzki (11)	Jason Kidd (10)	Madison Square Garden; 19,763	33–15
49	February 4	@ Boston	W 101–97	Dirk Nowitzki (29)	Tyson Chandler (15)	Jason Kidd (9)	TD Garden; 18,624	34–15
50	February 5	@ Charlotte	W 101–92	Dirk Nowitzki (25)	Tyson Chandler (15)	Jason Kidd (6)	Time Warner Cable Arena; 17,743	35–15
51	February 7	Cleveland	W 99–96	Jason Terry (23)	Tyson Chandler (11)	Jason Kidd (8)	American Airlines Center; 19,875	36–15
52	February 9	@ Sacramento	W 102–100	Jason Terry (22)	Jason Kidd (8)	Jason Kidd, Peja Stojaković (5)	ARCO Arena; 12,310	37–15
53	February 10	@ Denver	L 120–121	Jason Terry (25)	Tyson Chandler (11)	Jason Kidd, Dirk Nowitzki (6)	Pepsi Center; 16,273	37–16
54	February 12	@ Houston	W 106–102	Dirk Nowitzki, Peja Stojaković (22)	Shawn Marion (9)	Jason Terry (7)	Toyota Center; 17,009	38–16
55	February 16	Sacramento	W 116–100	Jason Kidd (20)	Brendan Haywood (10)	José Juan Barea (10)	American Airlines Center; 20,420	39–16
56	February 17	@ Phoenix	W 112–106	Dirk Nowitzki (35)	Tyson Chandler (12)	Jason Kidd (12)	US Airways Center; 17,903	40–16
All-Star Break
57	February 23	Utah	W 118–99	Dirk Nowitzki (23)	Tyson Chandler, Brendan Haywood (10)	Jason Kidd (12)	American Airlines Center; 20,379	41–16
58	February 26	@ Washington	W 105–99	Jason Terry (25)	Tyson Chandler (13)	Jason Kidd (14)	Verizon Center; 19,203	42–16
59	February 27	@ Toronto	W 114–96	Dirk Nowitzki (31)	Dirk Nowitzki (13)	José Juan Barea (9)	Air Canada Centre; 16,827	43–16

March: 9–6 (home: 4–3; road: 5–3)

Game	Date	Team	Score	High points	High rebounds	High assists	Location Attendance	Record
60	March 1	@ Philadelphia	W 101–93	Jason Terry (30)	Jason Kidd, Shawn Marion (10)	Jason Kidd (13)	Wells Fargo Center; 13,509	44–16
61	March 4	Indiana	W 116–108	Dirk Nowitzki (29)	Shawn Marion (7)	José Juan Barea (8)	American Airlines Center; 20,385	45–16
62	March 6	Memphis	L 103–104	Jason Terry (26)	Shawn Marion (12)	Jason Kidd (6)	American Airlines Center; 20,102	45–17
63	March 7	@ Minnesota	W 108–105	Dirk Nowitzki (25)	Brendan Haywood, Shawn Marion (10)	Jason Kidd (9)	Target Center; 13,288	46–17
64	March 9	@ New Orleans	L 92–93	Dirk Nowitzki (26)	Tyson Chandler (13)	Jason Kidd (7)	New Orleans Arena; 14,472	46–18
65	March 10	New York	W 127–109	Dirk Nowitzki (23)	Dirk Nowitzki (9)	Jason Kidd (8)	American Airlines Center; 20,517	47–18
66	March 12	LA Lakers	L 91–96	Shawn Marion, Dirk Nowitzki (25)	Shawn Marion (12)	Jason Kidd (9)	American Airlines Center; 20,619	47–19
67	March 15	@ Portland	L 101–104	Dirk Nowitzki (28)	Dirk Nowitzki (11)	Jason Kidd (14)	Rose Garden; 20,631	47–20
68	March 16	@ Golden State	W 112–106	Dirk Nowitzki (34)	Dirk Nowitzki (13)	Jason Kidd (11)	Oracle Arena; 19,596	48–20
69	March 18	San Antonio	L 91–97	Dirk Nowitzki (23)	Dirk Nowitzki (9)	Jason Kidd (9)	American Airlines Center; 20,614	48–21
70	March 20	Golden State	W 101–73	Dirk Nowitzki (20)	Tyson Chandler (17)	José Juan Barea, Jason Kidd (6)	American Airlines Center; 20,324	49–21
71	March 24	Minnesota	W 104–96	Dirk Nowitzki (30)	Dirk Nowitzki (11)	Jason Kidd (13)	American Airlines Center; 20,296	50–21
72	March 26	@ Utah	W 94–77	Jason Terry (22)	Tyson Chandler, Shawn Marion (7)	José Juan Barea, Jason Kidd (6)	EnergySolutions Arena; 19,649	51–21
73	March 27	@ Phoenix	W 91–83	Tyson Chandler, Jason Kidd, Jason Terry (16)	Tyson Chandler (18)	José Juan Barea (5)	US Airways Center; 17,314	52–21
74	March 30	@ LA Clippers	W 106–100	Dirk Nowitzki (24)	Shawn Marion (9)	Jason Kidd (10)	Staples Center; 19,060	53–21
75	March 31	@ LA Lakers	L 82–110	Dirk Nowitzki (27)	Dirk Nowitzki (13)	Jason Kidd (6)	Staples Center; 18,997	53–22

April: 4–3 (home: 3–1; road: 1–2)

Game	Date	Team	Score	High points	High rebounds	High assists	Location Attendance	Record
76	April 2	@ Golden State	L 92–99	Shawn Marion (21)	Shawn Marion (8)	José Juan Barea (11)	Oracle Arena; 18,128	53–23
77	April 3	@ Portland	L 96–104	Rodrigue Beaubois (20)	Brendan Haywood (11)	Rodrigue Beaubois, Jason Kidd (4)	Rose Garden; 20,534	53–24
78	April 6	Denver	L 96–104	Shawn Marion (21)	Brendan Haywood (19)	José Juan Barea (10)	American Airlines Center; 20,364	53–25
79	April 8	LA Clippers	W 107–96	Corey Brewer, Dirk Nowitzki (20)	Shawn Marion (10)	Dirk Nowitzki (7)	American Airlines Center; 20,382	54–25
80	April 10	Phoenix	W 115–90	Dirk Nowitzki (19)	Tyson Chandler (12)	Jason Kidd (7)	American Airlines Center; 20,355	55–25
81	April 11	@ Houston	W 98–91 (OT)	Dirk Nowitzki (23)	Tyson Chandler, Dirk Nowitzki (12)	José Juan Barea, Jason Kidd, Shawn Marion, Jason Terry (4)	Toyota Center; 14,898	56–25
82	April 13	New Orleans	W 121–89	Dirk Nowitzki (32)	Shawn Marion (8)	José Juan Barea, Jason Kidd (8)	American Airlines Center; 20,366	57–25

2010–11 season schedule

== Playoffs ==
The Mavericks' playoff run began with a six-game first round series against the Portland Trail Blazers. In the conference semi-finals, the Mavericks swept the two-time defending champion Los Angeles Lakers. The series against the Lakers also birthed the Mavericks Royal Blue-Out games in the AAC, with almost all fans wearing T-shirts that read "The Time is Now". In the Western Conference Finals against the Oklahoma City Thunder, the Mavericks won the last three games with fourth-quarter comebacks to win their second Western Conference Championship and earn a trip to the NBA Finals for the first time since 2006. Following a disappointing Game One, the Mavericks came back from 15 points down in Game 2 to even the series at 1 game apiece, the 5th largest comeback in a Finals game as of August 2026. After a loss in Game Three, the Mavericks won the last two games in Dallas to take a 3–2 series lead heading to Game Six in Miami. The Mavericks won Game Six; with that win, the Mavs became NBA Champions for the first time.

=== Game log ===
2011 playoff game log
Total: 16–5 (Home: 9–2; Road: 7–3)
First Round: 4–2 (home: 3–0; road: 1–2)

Game	Date	Team	Score	High points	High rebounds	High assists	Location Attendance	Series
1	April 16	Portland	W 89–81	Dirk Nowitzki (26)	Dirk Nowitzki (10)	Jason Kidd (4)	American Airlines Center; 20,541	1–0
2	April 19	Portland	W 101–89	Dirk Nowitzki (33)	Tyson Chandler (10)	Jason Kidd (8)	American Airlines Center; 20,620	2–0
3	April 21	@ Portland	L 92–97	Jason Terry (29)	Dirk Nowitzki (9)	Jason Terry (7)	Rose Garden; 20,217	2–1
4	April 23	@ Portland	L 82–84	Dirk Nowitzki (20)	Shawn Marion (11)	Jason Kidd (4)	Rose Garden; 20,357	2–2
5	April 25	Portland	W 93–82	Dirk Nowitzki (25)	Tyson Chandler (20)	Jason Kidd (14)	American Airlines Center; 20,837	3–2
6	April 28	@ Portland	W 103–96	Dirk Nowitzki (33)	Dirk Nowitzki (11)	Jason Terry (8)	Rose Garden; 20,494	4–2

Conference Semifinals: 4–0 (home: 2–0; road: 2–0)

Game	Date	Team	Score	High points	High rebounds	High assists	Location Attendance	Series
1	May 2	@ L.A. Lakers	W 96–94	Dirk Nowitzki (28)	Dirk Nowitzki (14)	Jason Kidd (11)	Staples Center; 18,997	1–0
2	May 4	@ L.A. Lakers	W 93–81	Dirk Nowitzki (24)	Shawn Marion (9)	Jason Kidd (6)	Staples Center; 18,997	2–0
3	May 6	L.A. Lakers	W 98–92	Dirk Nowitzki (32)	Dirk Nowitzki (9)	Jason Kidd (9)	American Airlines Center; 21,156	3–0
4	May 8	L.A. Lakers	W 122–86	Jason Terry (32)	Tyson Chandler (9)	José Juan Barea (8)	American Airlines Center; 21,087	4–0

Conference Finals: 4–1 (home: 2–1; road: 2–0)

Game	Date	Team	Score	High points	High rebounds	High assists	Location Attendance	Series
1	May 17	Oklahoma City	W 121–112	Dirk Nowitzki (48)	Tyson Chandler (8)	Jason Kidd (11)	American Airlines Center; 20,911	1–0
2	May 19	Oklahoma City	L 100–106	Dirk Nowitzki (29)	Tyson Chandler (13)	Jason Kidd (7)	American Airlines Center; 21,051	1–1
3	May 21	@ Oklahoma City	W 93–87	Shawn Marion, Dirk Nowitzki (18)	Tyson Chandler (15)	Jason Kidd (8)	Oklahoma City Arena; 18,203	2–1
4	May 23	@ Oklahoma City	W 112–105 (OT)	Dirk Nowitzki (40)	Tyson Chandler (8)	Jason Kidd (7)	Oklahoma City Arena; 18,203	3–1
5	May 25	Oklahoma City	W 100–96	Shawn Marion, Dirk Nowitzki (26)	Tyson Chandler, Dirk Nowitzki (9)	Jason Kidd (10)	American Airlines Center; 21,092	4–1

NBA Finals: 4–2 (home: 2–1; road: 2–1)

Game	Date	Team	Score	High points	High rebounds	High assists	Location Attendance	Series
1	May 31	@ Miami	L 84–92	Dirk Nowitzki (27)	Shawn Marion (10)	Jason Kidd (6)	American Airlines Arena; 20,003	0–1
2	June 2	@ Miami	W 95–93	Dirk Nowitzki (24)	Dirk Nowitzki (11)	Jason Kidd, Jason Terry (5)	American Airlines Arena; 20,003	1–1
3	June 5	Miami	L 86–88	Dirk Nowitzki (34)	Tyson Chandler, Dirk Nowitzki (11)	Jason Kidd (10)	American Airlines Center; 20,340	1–2
4	June 7	Miami	W 86–83	Dirk Nowitzki (21)	Tyson Chandler (16)	José Juan Barea (4)	American Airlines Center; 20,430	2–2
5	June 9	Miami	W 112–103	Dirk Nowitzki (29)	Tyson Chandler (7)	Jason Kidd, Jason Terry (6)	American Airlines Center; 20,433	3–2
6	June 12	@ Miami	W 105–95	Jason Terry (27)	Dirk Nowitzki (11)	Jason Kidd (8)	American Airlines Arena; 20,003	4–2

2011 playoff schedule

== Player statistics ==
=== Regular season ===
Player	POS	GP	GS	MP	REB	AST	STL	BLK	PTS	MPG	RPG	APG	SPG	BPG	PPG
Jason Terry	SG	82	10	2,564	153	334	93	13	1,293	31.3	1.9	4.1	1.1	.2	15.8
J. J. Barea	PG	81	2	1,669	159	317	30	1	769	20.6	2.0	3.9	.4	.0	9.5
Jason Kidd	PG	80	80	2,653	351	655	134	29	630	33.2	4.4	8.2	1.7	.4	7.9
Shawn Marion	SF	80	27	2,253	551	110	68	50	999	28.2	6.9	1.4	.9	.6	12.5
Tyson Chandler	C	74	74	2,059	692	32	36	80	748	27.8	9.4	.4	.5	1.1	10.1
Dirk Nowitzki	PF	73	73	2,504	513	190	38	47	1,681	34.3	7.0	2.6	.5	.6	23.0
DeShawn Stevenson	SG	72	54	1,158	106	77	21	5	383	16.1	1.5	1.1	.3	.1	5.3
Brendan Haywood	C	72	8	1,331	376	19	16	74	320	18.5	5.2	.3	.2	1.0	4.4
Brian Cardinal	SF	56	4	618	59	40	24	7	145	11.0	1.1	.7	.4	.1	2.6
Ian Mahinmi	C	56	0	488	120	8	14	15	173	8.7	2.1	.1	.3	.3	3.1
Caron Butler	SF	29	29	867	118	46	28	8	436	29.9	4.1	1.6	1.0	.3	15.0
Rodrigue Beaubois	PG	28	26	496	52	64	20	8	236	17.7	1.9	2.3	.7	.3	8.4
Peja Stojaković^{†}	SF	25	13	506	66	22	11	2	215	20.2	2.6	.9	.4	.1	8.6
Dominique Jones	SG	18	0	135	25	19	5	3	42	7.5	1.4	1.1	.3	.2	2.3
Corey Brewer^{†}	SG	13	2	148	23	12	11	2	69	11.4	1.8	.9	.8	.2	5.3
Aleksandar Pavlović^{†}	SF	10	6	163	12	7	5	3	41	16.3	1.2	.7	.5	.3	4.1
Alexis Ajinça^{†}	C	10	2	75	17	2	3	5	29	7.5	1.7	.2	.3	.5	2.9
Steve Novak^{†}	SF	7	0	18	5	0	0	0	11	2.6	.7	.0	.0	.0	1.6

- ^{†} Denotes player spent time with another team in the season. Stats reflect time with the Mavericks only.

=== Playoffs ===
Player	POS	GP	GS	MP	REB	AST	STL	BLK	PTS	MPG	RPG	APG	SPG	BPG	PPG
Dirk Nowitzki	PF	21	21	826	171	53	12	13	582	39.3	8.1	2.5	.6	.6	27.7
Jason Kidd	PG	21	21	744	95	153	40	10	195	35.4	4.5	7.3	1.9	.5	9.3
Shawn Marion	SF	21	21	690	133	45	21	19	250	32.9	6.3	2.1	1.0	.9	11.9
Tyson Chandler	C	21	21	680	193	8	13	19	167	32.4	9.2	.4	.6	.9	8.0
DeShawn Stevenson	SG	21	18	332	19	12	11	2	94	15.8	.9	.6	.5	.1	4.5
J. J. Barea	PG	21	3	390	39	71	6	0	187	18.6	1.9	3.4	.3	.0	8.9
Jason Terry	SG	21	0	684	40	67	26	3	368	32.6	1.9	3.2	1.2	.1	17.5
Peja Stojaković	SF	19	0	350	32	7	12	2	134	18.4	1.7	.4	.6	.1	7.1
Brendan Haywood	C	18	0	275	73	4	2	18	56	15.3	4.1	.2	.1	1.0	3.1
Brian Cardinal	SF	9	0	37	3	2	1	0	10	4.1	.3	.2	.1	.0	1.1
Ian Mahinmi	C	6	0	33	6	0	1	0	11	5.5	1.0	.0	.2	.0	1.8
Corey Brewer	SG	6	0	23	2	1	4	0	9	3.8	.3	.2	.7	.0	1.5

== Awards, records and milestones ==
=== Awards ===
==== Week/Month ====
- Dirk Nowitzki was named Western Conference Player of the Week for games played from November 22 through November 28.
- Dirk Nowitzki was named Western Conference Player of the Week for games played from December 6 through December 12.
- Rick Carlisle was named Western Conference Coach of the Month for games played in February.

==== All-Star ====
- Dirk Nowitzki was voted to his 10th NBA All-Star Game.

==== Season ====
- Dirk Nowitzki was named to the All-NBA Second Team
- Tyson Chandler was named to the All-Defensive Second Team

==== Playoffs ====
- Dirk Nowitzki was voted the NBA Finals Most Valuable Player.

=== Records ===
- On October 29, Dirk Nowitzki's free-throw streak came to an end at 82, when he missed a free-throw against Memphis. He now holds the record for the third-longest free-throw streak.
- In Game 1 of the Western Conference Finals, Dirk Nowitzki of the Dallas Mavericks set a playoff record for most free throws made without a miss with 24, previously held by Paul Pierce (21) in 2003.

=== Milestones ===
- On November 12, Jason Kidd recorded his 11,000th Assist during a game against the Philadelphia 76ers. He is the second player in NBA history to achieve it.
- On May 8, in a playoff game against the Los Angeles Lakers, Brian Cardinal hit the 20th three-pointer of the game, tying what was at the time the record set by the Houston Rockets on May 6, 1996. The current record belongs to the Cleveland Cavaliers, who hit 25 three-pointers in a game against the Atlanta Hawks on May 4, 2016.
- On June 12, the Dallas Mavericks defeated the Miami Heat in game 6 of the 2011 Finals, to win their first NBA Championship.
- On June 16, a crowd estimated at 200,000 lined the streets of Dallas for the first-ever NBA Championship Victory Parade. A celebration followed inside, at the American Airlines Center for Season ticket holders, and was broadcast on local TV.

== Major injuries and surgeries ==
Rodrigue Beaubois injured his foot during a practice session with the France national team. Beaubois broke the fifth metatarsal bone in his left foot. He underwent surgery, which was successful. He rebroke his foot, but returned to practice at February 8, 2011. Beaubois made his comeback in a game against Sacramento on February 16.

On January 4, 2011, Caron Butler was ruled out for the rest of the season after undergoing surgery to repair a ruptured right patellar tendon.

Head coach Rick Carlisle did not make the trip to Oklahoma because he was recovering from a minor arthroscopic knee surgery.

During a game against Milwaukee, Caron Butler injured his right knee and did not return to the game. Butler suffered a ruptured right patellar tendon on his right knee, underwent surgery on Tuesday, January 4, and missed the remainder of the season.

During the first quarter of a game against Detroit, Aleksandar Pavlović suffered a broken nose.

Rodrigue Beaubois missed Game 1 of the playoff series against Portland due to a foot sprain. He also missed Games 2–5 of the same series.

Dirk Nowitzki tore a tendon in the middle finger of his left (non-shooting) hand in Game 1 of the NBA Finals.

During the Finals against Miami, Brendan Haywood missed Game 3 due to a strained right hip flexor. He returned to play Game 4, but could not move well and only played a few minutes.

== See also ==
- 2010–11 NBA season
