= 2011 NBA Finals =

2011 basketball championship series

Team	Coach	Wins
Dallas Mavericks	Rick Carlisle	4
Miami Heat	Erik Spoelstra	2
- Dates: May 31 – June 12
- MVP: Dirk Nowitzki (Dallas Mavericks)
- Hall of Famers: Mavericks: Jason Kidd (2018); Dirk Nowitzki (2023); Heat: Chris Bosh (2021); Dwyane Wade (2023); Officials: Danny Crawford (2025)
- Eastern finals: Heat defeated Bulls, 4–1
- Western finals: Mavericks defeated Thunder, 4–1

The 2011 NBA Finals was the championship series of the National Basketball Association's (NBA) 2010–11 season, and the conclusion of the season's playoffs. A rematch of the 2006 Finals, the series was contested between the Western Conference champion Dallas Mavericks and the Eastern Conference champion Miami Heat. It was held from May 31 to June 12, 2011.

Entering the series as favorites due to their newly formed "superteam" of LeBron James, Dwyane Wade, and Chris Bosh, the Miami Heat won the opening game and eventually led the series 2–1 before the Dallas Mavericks won the next three games to achieve their first championship in franchise history. Mavericks forward and German player Dirk Nowitzki was named Finals MVP, becoming the second European to win the award after Tony Parker in 2007, and the first German player to do so. The series has been described by some sportswriters as one of the greatest finals of all time.

== Background ==
Both the Mavericks and Heat made their second appearance in the NBA Finals, the first for both teams being the 2006 NBA Finals. This Finals marked a rematch of those 2006 Finals, won by Miami in six games, after the Mavericks were up 2–0.

It was the first time since 2006 that neither the Los Angeles Lakers nor the San Antonio Spurs represented the Western Conference in the Finals and only the second time since 1998, and also the thirteenth consecutive NBA Finals to feature a Western Conference champion from either the states of California or Texas. This was also the first finals since 1998 not to feature Kobe Bryant (2000–2002, 2004, 2008–2010), Shaquille O'Neal (2000–2002, 2004, 2006) or Tim Duncan (1999, 2003, 2005, 2007).

The Mavericks' appearance also meant that three of North America's four major professional sports championships were played in the Dallas–Fort Worth metroplex in a span of eight months, with the 2010 World Series and Super Bowl XLV both occurring in nearby Arlington.

The Heat had home-court advantage by virtue of a better regular-season record than the Mavericks. This was only the second time that the Eastern Conference had home-court advantage during the Finals since the end of the Michael Jordan era in 1998. It also marked the first time since 1995 that the Eastern Conference team lost in the Finals despite having home-court advantage.

The 2011 series marked the first time a Finals match (Game 1) was played in the month of May since 1986.

Among the players from both teams, only Dirk Nowitzki and Jason Terry of Dallas, and Dwyane Wade and Udonis Haslem of Miami, appeared in the 2006 series with the same team. Heat center Erick Dampier played for the Mavericks in 2006. Aside from Dampier, Caron Butler, Juwan Howard, and Shawn Marion are the only other players who have played for both the Mavericks and Heat. Eddie House, Žydrūnas Ilgauskas, LeBron James (James would reach the finals every year from 2011 to 2018, with both the Heat and the Cavaliers), and Jason Kidd have appeared in the Finals with different teams, with House (as a member of Boston's 2008 championship team), Wade and Haslem winning a championship ring. Mavericks head coach Rick Carlisle won a championship as a reserve for Boston's 1986 championship team making him only the eleventh person in NBA history to win a Finals as both a player and a coach.

Prior to the start of the season, Jason Terry tattooed the Larry O'Brien Championship Trophy on his right biceps, anticipating the Mavericks would be champions this season.

=== Road to the Finals ===
Dallas Mavericks (Western Conference champion)		Miami Heat (Eastern Conference champion)
# / Western Conference; # / Team / W / L / PCT / GB; 1 / c-San Antonio Spurs / 61 / 21 / .744 / –; 2 / y-Los Angeles Lakers / 57 / 25 / .695 / 4; 3 / x-Dallas Mavericks / 57 / 25 / .695 / 4; 4 / y-Oklahoma City Thunder / 55 / 27 / .671 / 6; 5 / x-Denver Nuggets / 50 / 32 / .610 / 11; 6 / x-Portland Trail Blazers / 48 / 34 / .585 / 13; 7 / x-New Orleans Hornets / 46 / 36 / .561 / 15; 8 / x-Memphis Grizzlies / 46 / 36 / .561 / 15; 9 / Houston Rockets / 43 / 39 / .524 / 18; 10 / Phoenix Suns / 40 / 42 / .488 / 21; 11 / Utah Jazz / 39 / 43 / .476 / 22; 12 / Golden State Warriors / 36 / 46 / .439 / 25; 13 / Los Angeles Clippers / 32 / 50 / .390 / 29; 14 / Sacramento Kings / 24 / 58 / .293 / 37; 15 / Minnesota Timberwolves / 17 / 65 / .207 / 44; 3rd seed in the West, 5th-best league record	Regular season	# / Eastern Conference; # / Team / W / L / PCT / GB; 1 / z-Chicago Bulls / 62 / 20 / .756 / –; 2 / y-Miami Heat / 58 / 24 / .707 / 4; 3 / y-Boston Celtics / 56 / 26 / .683 / 6; 4 / x-Orlando Magic / 52 / 30 / .634 / 10; 5 / x-Atlanta Hawks / 44 / 38 / .537 / 18; 6 / x-New York Knicks / 42 / 40 / .512 / 20; 7 / x-Philadelphia 76ers / 41 / 41 / .500 / 21; 8 / x-Indiana Pacers / 37 / 45 / .451 / 25; 9 / Milwaukee Bucks / 35 / 47 / .427 / 27; 10 / Charlotte Bobcats / 34 / 48 / .415 / 28; 11 / Detroit Pistons / 30 / 52 / .366 / 32; 12 / New Jersey Nets / 24 / 58 / .293 / 38; 13 / Washington Wizards / 23 / 59 / .280 / 39; 14 / Toronto Raptors / 22 / 60 / .268 / 40; 15 / Cleveland Cavaliers / 19 / 63 / .232 / 43; 2nd seed in the East, 3rd-best league record
Defeated the 6th-seeded Portland Trail Blazers, 4–2	First round	Defeated the 7th-seeded Philadelphia 76ers, 4–1
Defeated the 2nd-seeded Los Angeles Lakers, 4–0	Conference semifinals	Defeated the 3rd-seeded Boston Celtics, 4–1
Defeated the 4th-seeded Oklahoma City Thunder, 4–1	Conference finals	Defeated the 1st-seeded Chicago Bulls, 4–1

=== Regular-season series ===
The Dallas Mavericks won both games in the regular season.

November 27, 2010

Recap

Miami Heat 95, Dallas Mavericks 106

American Airlines Center, Dallas, Texas

December 20, 2010

Recap

Dallas Mavericks 98, Miami Heat 96

American Airlines Arena, Miami, Florida

== Series summary ==
Game	Date	Road team	Result	Home team
Game 1	May 31	Dallas Mavericks	84–92 (0–1)	Miami Heat
Game 2	June 2	Dallas Mavericks	95–93 (1–1)	Miami Heat
Game 3	June 5	Miami Heat	88–86 (2–1)	Dallas Mavericks
Game 4	June 7	Miami Heat	83–86 (2–2)	Dallas Mavericks
Game 5	June 9	Miami Heat	103–112 (2–3)	Dallas Mavericks
Game 6	June 12	Dallas Mavericks	105–95 (4–2)	Miami Heat

== Game summaries ==
All times are in Eastern Daylight Time (UTC−4).

=== Game 1 ===
ABC

May 31
9:00 pm

Recap with video

Dallas Mavericks 84, Miami Heat 92
Scoring by quarter: 17–16, 27–27, 17–22, 23–27
Pts: Dirk Nowitzki 27; Rebs: Shawn Marion 10; Asts: Jason Kidd 6	Pts: LeBron James 24; Rebs: Dwyane Wade 10; Asts: Dwyane Wade 6
Miami leads series, 1–0

American Airlines Arena, Miami, Florida
Attendance: 20,003
Referees: Steve Javie, Mike Callahan, Bill Kennedy

Game 1 was the first NBA Finals game to be held in the month of May since 1986. The Heat made only 28.6 percent of their shots during the first quarter, and this low scoring percentage early on left the Mavs with an 8-point lead early into the 3rd quarter. The Heat changed course from this point on, outscoring the Mavs 22–10 and taking a 65–61 lead going into the 4th quarter. Mavs power forward Dirk Nowitzki injured his finger within the last four minutes of the game, but remained in play, wearing a splint to support the torn tendon. Despite having a below-average performance early in the game, Heat shooting guard Dwyane Wade and small forward LeBron James collaborated on both defensive and offensive ends of the court in the fourth quarter, leading the Heat to win Game 1 over the Mavs 92–84.

=== Game 2 ===
ABC

June 2
9:00 pm

Recap with video

Dallas Mavericks 95, Miami Heat 93
Scoring by quarter: 28–28, 23–23, 20–24, 24–18
Pts: Dirk Nowitzki 24; Rebs: Dirk Nowitzki 11; Asts: Kidd, Terry 5 each	Pts: Dwyane Wade 36; Rebs: James, Bosh 8 each Asts: Dwyane Wade 6
Series tied, 1–1

American Airlines Arena, Miami, Florida
Attendance: 20,003
Referees: Joe Crawford, Ed Malloy, Ken Mauer

External videos
- Full game broadcast by ABC on YouTube

The Mavs' 15-point comeback was the biggest in an NBA Finals game since the 24-point comeback the Celtics made against the Lakers in Game 4 of the 2008 NBA Finals. Dirk Nowitzki hit a 3 with 26.7 seconds left to give the Mavericks a 93–90 lead. However, Mario Chalmers tied it with a 3 of his own with 24.5 seconds left when Jason Terry left him wide open. After Jason Kidd ran the clock down, Nowitzki then made a driving layup with his injured left hand with 3.6 seconds left. The Heat had no timeouts left, and Dwyane Wade's potential game-winning 3 hit the back rim at the buzzer as he fell to the ground in an attempt to draw a foul on Nowitzki. The Mavs' win broke the Heat's 9-game home winning streak in the playoffs, costing them a chance to tie the 1996 Bulls' mark of 10 straight. This was the second straight Finals with a 1–1 split after two games, after five straight years with one team leading 2–0 (2005–09).

=== Game 3 ===
ABC

June 5
8:00 pm

Recap with video

Miami Heat 88, Dallas Mavericks 86
Scoring by quarter: 29–22, 18–20, 20–22, 21–22
Pts: Dwyane Wade 29; Rebs: Dwyane Wade 11; Asts: LeBron James 9	Pts: Dirk Nowitzki 34; Rebs: Chandler, Nowitzki 11 each Asts: Jason Kidd 10
Miami leads series, 2–1

American Airlines Center, Dallas, Texas
Attendance: 20,340
Referees: Danny Crawford, Scott Foster, Derrick Stafford

The Heat led most of the game, but the Mavericks fought back from a 14-point deficit. With 39.6 seconds left in the 4th, LeBron James found Chris Bosh for a 20-foot baseline jumper; Dirk Nowitzki had a chance to force OT, but missed a well-defended fadeaway jumper at the buzzer as the Heat handed Dallas another defeat to go up 2–1 in the series. It was Miami's sixth win in its last seven NBA Finals games, four by 3 points or less.

=== Game 4 ===
ABC

June 7
9:00 pm

Recap with video

Miami Heat 83, Dallas Mavericks 86
Scoring by quarter: 21–21, 26–24, 22–20, 14–21
Pts: Dwyane Wade 32; Rebs: LeBron James 9 Asts: LeBron James 7	Pts: Dirk Nowitzki 21; Rebs: Tyson Chandler 16; Asts: José Juan Barea 4
Series tied, 2–2

American Airlines Center, Dallas, Texas
Attendance: 20,430
Referees: Monty McCutchen, Marc Davis, Greg Willard

Nowitzki was questionable for the game with a flu.

Game 4 was a back-and-forth affair, with 12 lead changes and 15 ties. Miami went up 74–65 early in the fourth quarter on a baseline jumpshot by Udonis Haslem, tallying their largest lead of the game. After a timeout, Dallas answered with 4 straight points by Jason Terry, similar to the 6 straight he scored with Dallas down 15 halfway through the fourth quarter of Game 2. Dallas would take their first lead of the fourth quarter with 5:15 left on a fastbreak layup by Terry. They held the lead for the rest of the game, although Miami cut the lead to 1 twice in the final minute. Up 82–81 with 20 seconds left after Dwyane Wade missed 1 of 2 free throws, Dirk Nowitzki hit a driving layup with 14.4 seconds left to extend the lead to 3. After a dunk by Wade with 9 seconds left, 2 free throws by Terry pushed the lead back up to 3. With a chance to tie the game with a 3, Wade fumbled the inbounds pass with 6.7 seconds left, only to make a diving save to prevent a backcourt violation. The ball landed in Mike Miller's hands, whose desperation 3 airballed at the buzzer, preserving Dallas' 86–83 win. LeBron James scored just 8 total points in Game 4 on 3-11 (27.2%) shooting, including going 0-6 from the field when guarded by Jason Kidd or Jason Terry, but still led his team with 9 rebounds and 7 assists.

=== Game 5 ===
ABC

June 9
9:00 pm

Recap with video

Miami Heat 103, Dallas Mavericks 112
Scoring by quarter: 31–30, 26–30, 22–24, 24–28
Pts: Dwyane Wade 23; Rebs: James, Bosh 10 each Asts: LeBron James 10	Pts: Dirk Nowitzki 29; Rebs: Tyson Chandler 7 Asts: Kidd, Terry 6 each
Dallas leads series, 3–2

American Airlines Center, Dallas, Texas
Attendance: 20,433
Referees: Joe Crawford, Mike Callahan, Bill Kennedy

After pre-game walkthroughs, LeBron James and Dwyane Wade mocked Nowitzki with fake coughs, as they felt like he was "faking" his reported flu; years later, Wade acknowledged the incident was a childish in an interview with Nowitzki.

After four low-scoring games, Game 5 saw the first time either team would break 100 points in this series. Dallas connected 13 times out of their 19 tries from three-point range. Jason Terry, Jason Kidd, and J. J. Barea combined to make 10 of those 13 made threes. Late in the first quarter, Dwyane Wade ran into Brian Cardinal and had to go to the locker room with a hip injury; he eventually returned and hit a 3 to cap a 9–0 run that put Miami in front 99–95 with less than 5 minutes left in the game. Unhappy with Terry for missing a defensive assignment and setting a poor cross-screen, Mavs coach Rick Carlisle pulled Terry from the game, telling him, "Refocus. I'm putting you right back in." After less than a minute, Carlisle subbed in Terry and made the crucial decision to run the offense through him for the rest of the game. This move ignited Dallas' offense, leading them on a game-winning 15–3 run in which Terry scored or assisted on 11 points. With Miami leading 100–97, Terry passed to Dirk Nowitzki, who drew a double team and then kicked it back out to Terry for a game-tying 3. Nowitzki then drove baseline on Chris Bosh for a two-handed dunk (assisted by Terry) with 2:44 left in the game to give the Mavs a 102–100 lead they would not relinquish. After LeBron James was called for an offensive foul (Tyson Chandler drew the charge), Terry found Kidd for another wide-open 3 that gave the Mavs a 105–100 lead with 1:26 left. After Chandler blocked Wade with 1:04 left, Bosh made 1 of 2 free throws to cut the Mavs' lead to 105–101. On the Mavs' next possession, Terry knocked down a 28-foot three-pointer with James closely guarding him to give the Mavs an insurmountable 108–101 lead with 33.3 seconds left. The Mavericks won 112–103 and grabbed a 3–2 series lead going back to Miami.

=== Game 6 ===
ABC

June 12
8:00 pm

Recap with video

Dallas Mavericks 105, Miami Heat 95
Scoring by quarter: 32–27, 21–24, 28–21, 24–23
Pts: Jason Terry 27; Rebs: Dirk Nowitzki 11; Asts: Jason Kidd 8	Pts: LeBron James 21; Rebs: Udonis Haslem 9 Asts: Mario Chalmers 7
Dallas wins NBA Finals, 4–2

American Airlines Arena, Miami, Florida
Attendance: 20,003
Referees: Steve Javie, Scott Foster, Derrick Stafford

LeBron James made his first four shots to contribute to the Heat taking a 20–11 lead. The Mavericks went to a zone defense that perplexed Miami and Dallas went on a 21–4 run in a span of 5½ minutes. They made 9 of 12 shots during this stretch with DeShawn Stevenson making three-pointers in a 24-second duration to give Dallas a 40–28 lead with 9:42 left in the first half. Dallas turned Miami's first six turnovers into 14 points. The Heat then went on a 14–0 run to take a 42–40 lead. With 6:25 left in the half, Stevenson along with Udonis Haslem and Mario Chalmers received technical fouls after a scuffle occurred at midcourt during a timeout. In the second half, James did not score until making a layup with 1:49 remaining in the third. The Mavericks led by nine going into the 4th quarter after Ian Mahinmi hit a buzzer beater to give Dallas an 81–72 lead. The Mavericks took a 12-point lead with 8:12 remaining. With 2:27 left, Nowitzki made a jump shot to help build the Mavericks' lead to 99–89. The Mavericks, who led for the final 22 minutes in the game, won their first championship in franchise history. Nowitzki was named Finals MVP. He had a poor shooting performance in the first half but managed to score 18 points in the second half. When the final buzzer sounded, an emotional Nowitzki went straight to the locker room in tears, although he re-emerged for the trophy presentation.

== Rosters ==
=== Dallas Mavericks ===
2010–11 Dallas Mavericks roster
Players

Pos.	No.	Player	Height	Weight	DOB	From
PG	11	J. J. Barea	5 ft 10 in (1.78 m)	185 lb (84 kg)	1984–06–26	Northeastern
PG	3	Rodrigue Beaubois	6 ft 0 in (1.83 m)	170 lb (77 kg)	1988–02–24	France
F	13	Corey Brewer	6 ft 9 in (2.06 m)	186 lb (84 kg)	1986–03–05	Florida
F	4	Caron Butler	6 ft 7 in (2.01 m)	228 lb (103 kg)	1980–03–13	Connecticut
F	35	Brian Cardinal	6 ft 8 in (2.03 m)	245 lb (111 kg)	1977–05–02	Purdue
C	6	Tyson Chandler	7 ft 1 in (2.16 m)	240 lb (109 kg)	1982–10–02	Dominguez HS (California)
C	33	Brendan Haywood	7 ft 0 in (2.13 m)	268 lb (122 kg)	1979–11–27	North Carolina
G	20	Dominique Jones	6 ft 4 in (1.93 m)	215 lb (98 kg)	1988–10–15	South Florida
PG	2	Jason Kidd	6 ft 4 in (1.93 m)	205 lb (93 kg)	1973–03–23	California
C	28	Ian Mahinmi	6 ft 11 in (2.11 m)	262 lb (119 kg)	1986–11–05	France
F	0	Shawn Marion	6 ft 7 in (2.01 m)	220 lb (100 kg)	1978–05–07	UNLV
PF	41	Dirk Nowitzki	7 ft 0 in (2.13 m)	245 lb (111 kg)	1978–06–19	Germany
G	92	DeShawn Stevenson	6 ft 5 in (1.96 m)	210 lb (95 kg)	1981–04–03	Washington Union HS (California)
SF	16	Peja Stojaković	6 ft 10 in (2.08 m)	229 lb (104 kg)	1977–06–09	Serbia
G	31	Jason Terry	6 ft 2 in (1.88 m)	185 lb (84 kg)	1977–09–15	Arizona

Coaches
Head coach
- Rick Carlisle
Assistant(s)
- Darrell Armstrong
- Dwane Casey
- Monte Mathis
- Robert Hackett
- Terry Stotts

Legend
- (DP) Unsigned draft pick
- (FA) Free agent
- (S) Suspended
- Injured

=== Miami Heat ===
2010–11 Miami Heat roster
Players

Pos.	No.	Player	Height	Weight	DOB	From
C	50	Joel Anthony	6 ft 9 in (2.06 m)	245 lb (111 kg)	1982–08–09	UNLV
G	0	Mike Bibby	6 ft 2 in (1.88 m)	195 lb (88 kg)	1978–05–13	Arizona
F	1	Chris Bosh	6 ft 11 in (2.11 m)	230 lb (104 kg)	1984–03–24	Georgia Tech
G	15	Mario Chalmers	6 ft 2 in (1.88 m)	195 lb (88 kg)	1986–05–19	Kansas
C	25	Erick Dampier	6 ft 11 in (2.11 m)	265 lb (120 kg)	1975–07–14	Mississippi State
F	40	Udonis Haslem	6 ft 8 in (2.03 m)	235 lb (107 kg)	1980–06–09	Florida
G	55	Eddie House	6 ft 1 in (1.85 m)	178 lb (81 kg)	1978–05–14	Arizona State
F	5	Juwan Howard	6 ft 9 in (2.06 m)	253 lb (115 kg)	1973–02–07	Michigan
C	11	Žydrūnas Ilgauskas	7 ft 3 in (2.21 m)	260 lb (118 kg)	1975–06–05	Lithuania
F	6	LeBron James	6 ft 8 in (2.03 m)	250 lb (113 kg)	1984-12-30	St. Vincent – St. Mary HS (Ohio)
F	22	James Jones	6 ft 8 in (2.03 m)	215 lb (98 kg)	1980–10–04	Miami (FL)
C	21	Jamaal Magloire	6 ft 11 in (2.11 m)	255 lb (116 kg)	1978–05–21	Kentucky
F	13	Mike Miller	6 ft 8 in (2.03 m)	218 lb (99 kg)	1980–02–19	Florida
C	45	Dexter Pittman	6 ft 10 in (2.08 m)	290 lb (132 kg)	1988–03–02	Texas
G	3	Dwyane Wade	6 ft 4 in (1.93 m)	220 lb (100 kg)	1982–01–17	Marquette

Coaches
Head coach
- Erik Spoelstra
Assistant(s)
- Keith Askins
- David Fizdale
- Bill Foran
- Chet Kammerer
- Bob McAdoo
- Ron Rothstein

Legend
- (DP) Unsigned draft pick
- (FA) Free agent
- (S) Suspended
- Injured

== Player statistics ==
Legend
GP	Games played	GS	Games started	MPG	Minutes per game
FG%	Field-goal percentage	3P%	3-point field-goal percentage	FT%	Free-throw percentage
RPG	Rebounds per game	APG	Assists per game	SPG	Steals per game
BPG	Blocks per game	PPG	Points per game

Dallas Mavericks

|-

Dallas Mavericks statistics
Player	GP	GS	MPG	FG%	3P%	FT%	RPG	APG	SPG	BPG	PPG
José Juan Barea	6	3	21.4	.382	.333	.714	2.2	3.2	0.5	0.0	8.8
Brian Cardinal	5	0	6.1	.667	.667	.500	0.2	0.2	0.2	0.0	1.4
Tyson Chandler	6	6	37.3	.594	.000	.625	8.8	0.7	1.2	1.2	9.7
Brendan Haywood	3	0	8.5	.333	.000	.500	2.3	0.0	0.3	1.0	1.7
Jason Kidd	6	6	37.4	.389	.429	.750	4.5	6.3	1.2	0.8	7.7
Ian Mahinmi	3	0	9.0	.600	.000	.600	1.7	0.0	0.3	0.0	3.0
Shawn Marion	6	6	35.8	.479	.000	.824	6.3	2.3	0.8	0.7	13.7
Dirk Nowitzki	6	6	40.4	.416	.368	.978	9.7	2.0	0.7	0.7	26.0
DeShawn Stevenson	6	3	17.2	.542	.565	.750	1.5	0.3	0.7	0.2	7.0
Peja Stojaković	4	0	6.4	.200	.000	.000	0.8	0.0	0.5	0.0	0.5
Jason Terry	6	0	32.6	.494	.393	.750	2.0	3.2	1.3	0.0	18.0

Miami Heat

Miami Heat statistics
Player	GP	GS	MPG	FG%	3P%	FT%	RPG	APG	SPG	BPG	PPG
Joel Anthony	6	6	20.6	.286	.000	.000	3.5	0.3	0.2	1.2	1.3
Mike Bibby	5	5	17.4	.350	.294	.000	1.4	1.0	1.4	0.2	3.8
Chris Bosh	6	6	39.4	.413	.000	.778	7.3	1.0	0.2	0.5	18.5
Mario Chalmers	6	1	28.9	.426	.400	.739	2.7	3.5	1.7	0.0	11.8
Udonis Haslem	6	0	29.4	.450	.000	.800	5.2	0.7	0.5	0.5	6.7
Eddie House	2	0	12.3	.333	.375	.000	2.0	0.5	1.0	0.0	4.5
Juwan Howard	5	0	5.9	.600	.000	.500	1.2	0.2	0.0	0.0	1.8
LeBron James	6	6	43.6	.478	.321	.600	7.2	6.8	1.7	0.5	17.8
Mike Miller	6	0	15.6	.304	.389	.000	2.8	0.8	0.8	0.2	3.5
Dwyane Wade	6	6	39.0	.546	.304	.694	7.0	5.2	1.5	1.5	26.5

== Broadcast notes ==
The Finals were originally projected to begin on Thursday, June 9, but (along with the entire NBA schedule) were pushed up ahead one week to Thursday, June 2 due to negotiations on an impending league-wide lockout at the end of the season. They were again pushed ahead to a start date of May 31 as both conference finals series ended in five games.

The Finals were televised in the United States through ABC (which included the respective Miami and Dallas affiliates WPLG and WFAA), with Mike Breen, Mark Jackson and Jeff Van Gundy as announcers. Doris Burke was the sideline reporter, while Stuart Scott hosted the championship presentation. Scott also hosted the pre-game and halftime shows along with Jon Barry, Michael Wilbon, and Magic Johnson. ESPN Radio aired the Finals nationally on radio, with Mike Tirico, Hubie Brown, and Jack Ramsay announcing.

Until 2014, this is the last Finals to be called entirely by Breen, Van Gundy, and Jackson altogether.

Game	Ratings (households)	Share (households)	American audience (in millions)
1	9.0	15	15.171
2	9.3	16	15.522
3	9.1	15	15.338
4	9.6	16	16.126
5	10.8	19	18.318
6	13.3	22	23.880

== Aftermath ==
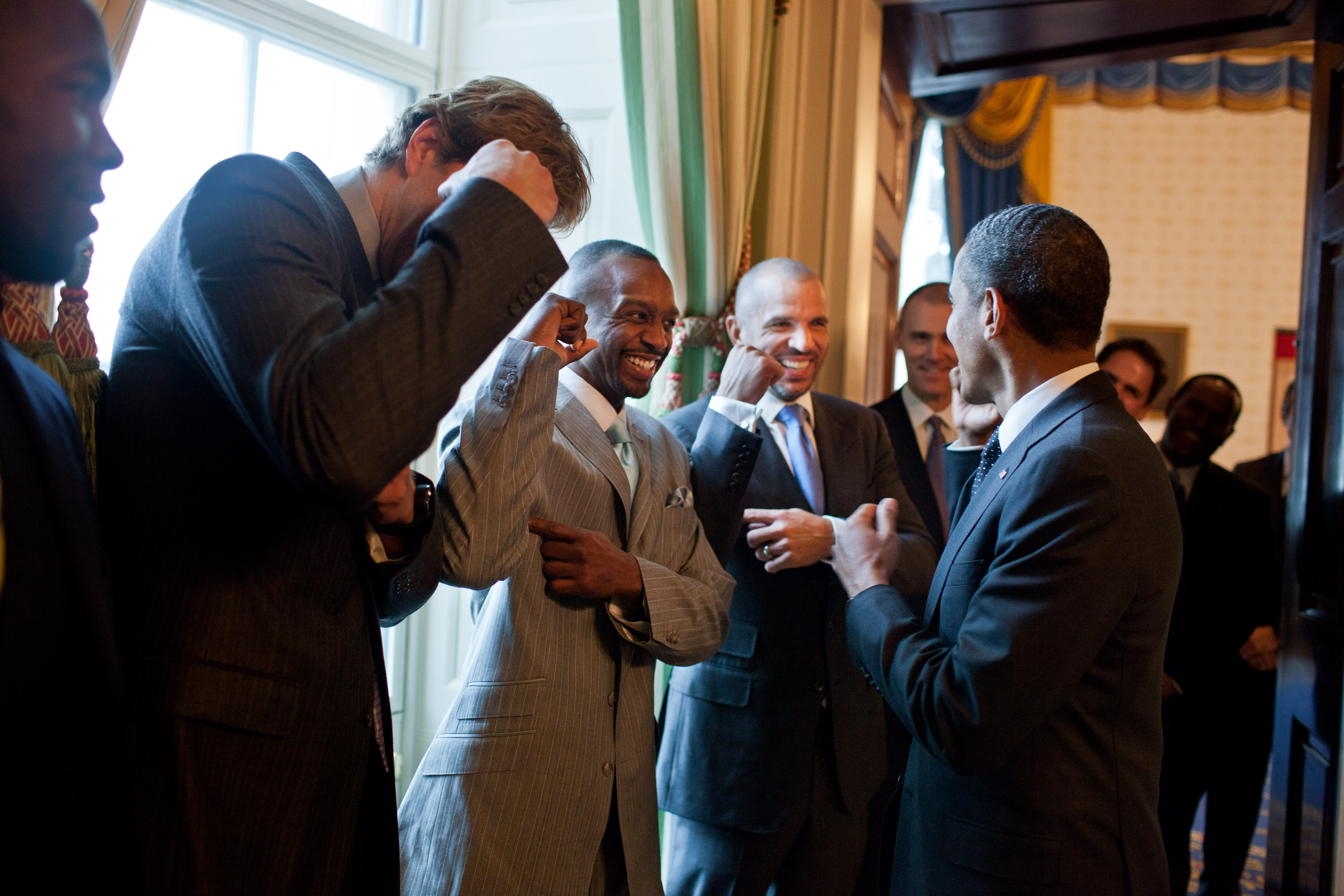
President Barack Obama meeting Jason Kidd, Jason Terry, and Dirk Nowitzki at the Mavericks White House visit in 2012.

The 2011 edition of the NBA Finals is considered one of the best ever, although it is often overshadowed by the two other great Finals in the decade (2013 and 2016). From the 2011–2020 NBA Finals, LeBron James or Stephen Curry would participate each one, similar to how superstar players Shaquille O'Neal, Kobe Bryant and Tim Duncan accomplished this feat from the 1999–2010 NBA Finals.

LeBron James was criticized heavily for his performance in the Finals. James averaged 17.8 points, 7.2 rebounds and 6.8 assists in the 6 games (all well below his season averages), culminating in just an 8 point, 7 assist, 9 rebound performance in a pivotal Game 4 (the Heat would lose this game and the final 2). James was often guarded by smaller players, such as Jason Terry, Jason Kidd, and J.J. Barea, and DeShawn Stevenson, yet could not take advantage of these mismatches. Throughout all six fourth quarters in the 2011 Finals, he scored just eight points. In 2024, James would call the 2011 Finals the lowest point of his career. James and the Heat quickly rebounded, winning the next two NBA Finals (2012, 2013).

2011 represented a high-point for the Mavericks and franchise player Dirk Nowitzki. Before 2011, the Mavericks had not come away with a Larry O'Brien trophy after 10 straight postseason trips. Much of the criticism was placed at the feet of Nowitzki, the team's best player. However, in 2011, it would all come together, with the Mavericks championship run being considered as one of the toughest in NBA history, along with the 1969 Celtics and 1995 Rockets. In the 2011 playoffs, the Mavs survived a scare from the Trail Blazers in the first round, handily swept the defending champion Lakers in the second round, and dispatched the upstart Thunder in the Western Conference finals. From there, they pulled off one of the biggest upsets in the NBA Finals history by defeating the Big Three Miami Heat. The Mavs did not have the home-court advantage in any of the last three rounds. On the run to the Finals, Nowitzki also ended the narrative as a playoff under-performer, as he tied the record for most made FGs to tie/take the lead in the last 90 seconds of the 4th/OT in one playoffs (since the play-by-play era in 1997) with 5.

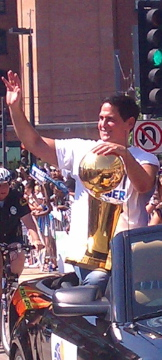
Owner Mark Cuban at the Mavericks championship parade

In the summer, team owner Mark Cuban elected not to re-sign center and defensive anchor Tyson Chandler. They also lost top defensive assistant coach coach Dwane Casey to the Toronto Raptors. These losses severely hurt the team's defense the following season, as they fell to 7th place in the conference during the lockout shortened 2011–12 season. Overall, after the championship season, the Mavericks made the playoff four of the next five seasons, but did not win any round. Nowitzki retired in 2019, with the 2011 NBA Finals being the last playoff series he won.

Like he did prior to the Mavericks championship season in 2010–2011, two years later prior to the 2012–13 season, Jason Terry, by then with the Boston Celtics, tattooed the Celtics' famous leprechaun spinning the Larry O'Brien trophy on his finger on his left arm. However, the Celtics did not win the championship that season.

Jason Kidd would later coach LeBron James as an assistant coach during the 2019–2020 Los Angeles Lakers season. Kidd became the head coach for the Mavs in 2021, a position he held until 2026, after Rick Carlisle mutually parted ways with the team.

The championship won by the Mavericks would be the first for the Dallas-Fort Worth Metroplex, since the Dallas Stars won the Stanley Cup in 1999 and the last until the Texas Rangers defeated the Arizona Diamondbacks in the World Series in 2023. The Mavericks would return to the Finals again in 2024 but fell to the Boston Celtics in five games.

=== In popular culture ===
In Puerto Rican rapper Bad Bunny's 2022 song El Apagón, he shouts out fellow Puerto Rican J. J. Barea while taking a small diss at LeBron James: "Y de Barea, el que fue campeón primero que Lebron" which translates to "And Barea, the one who was a champion before LeBron". This was in reference to Dallas win over Miami in 2011, which allowed Barea to win a championship before James.
