= Big Three (Miami Heat) =

Trio of professional basketball players

The Big Three

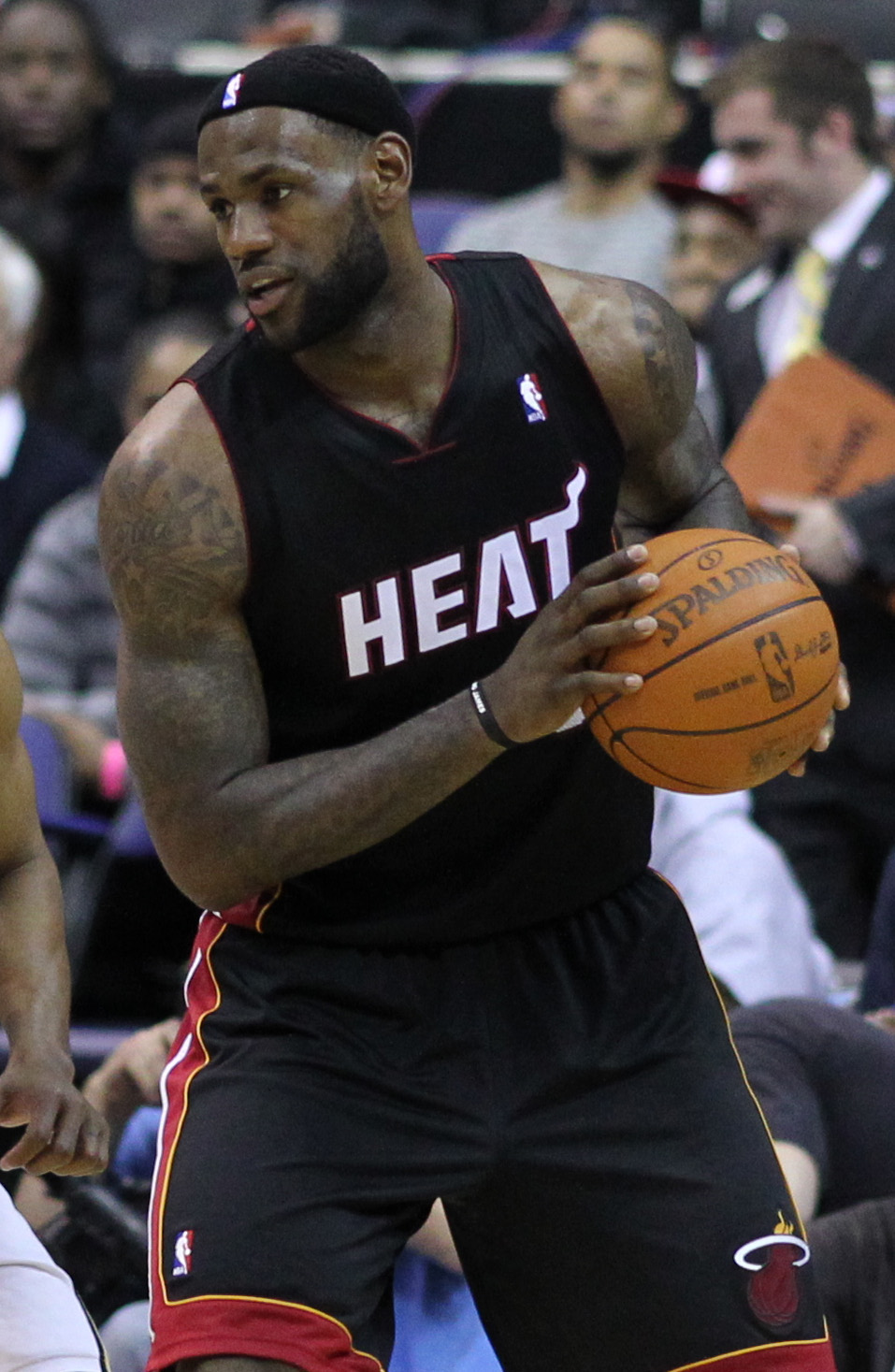
LeBron James

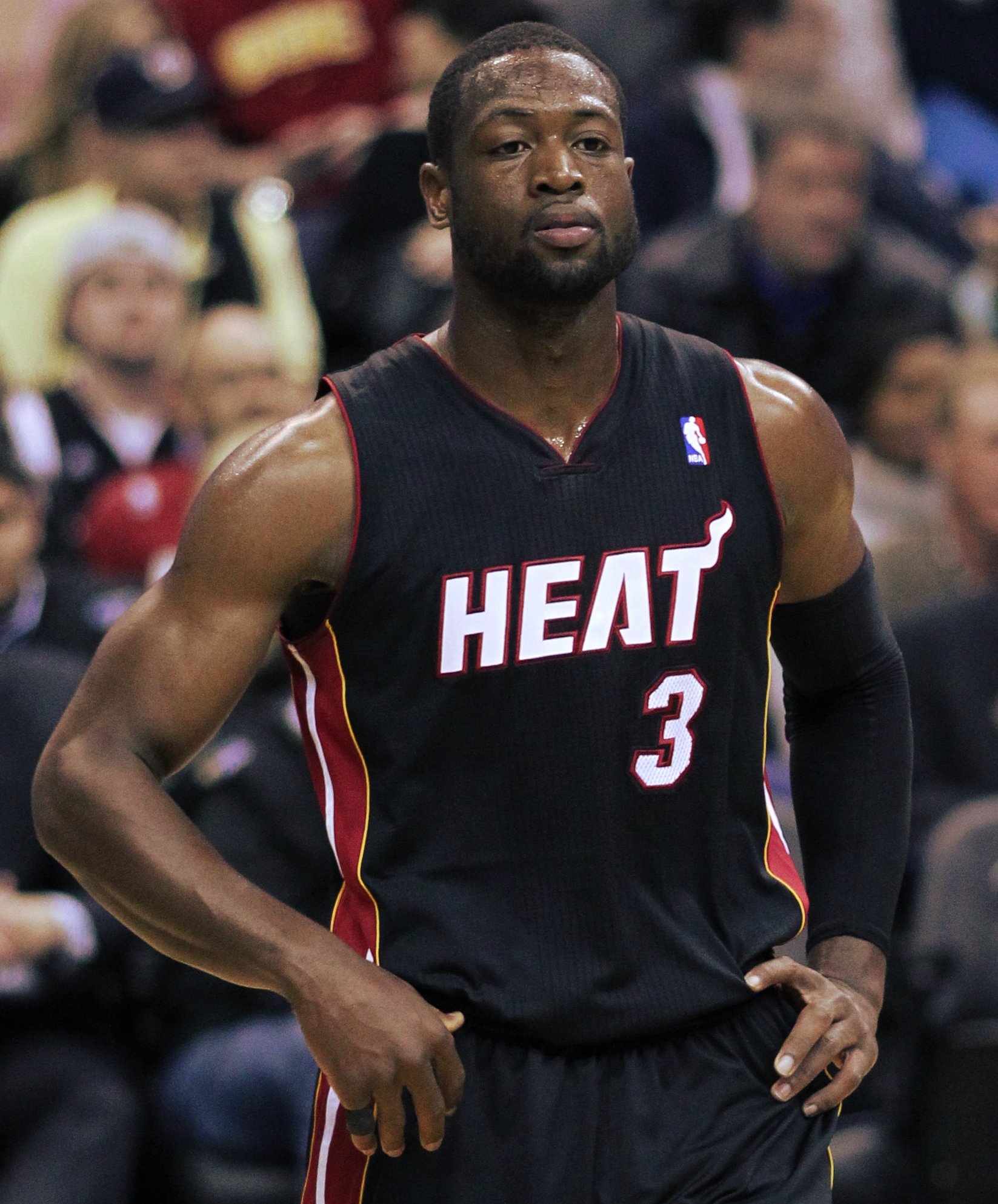
Dwyane Wade

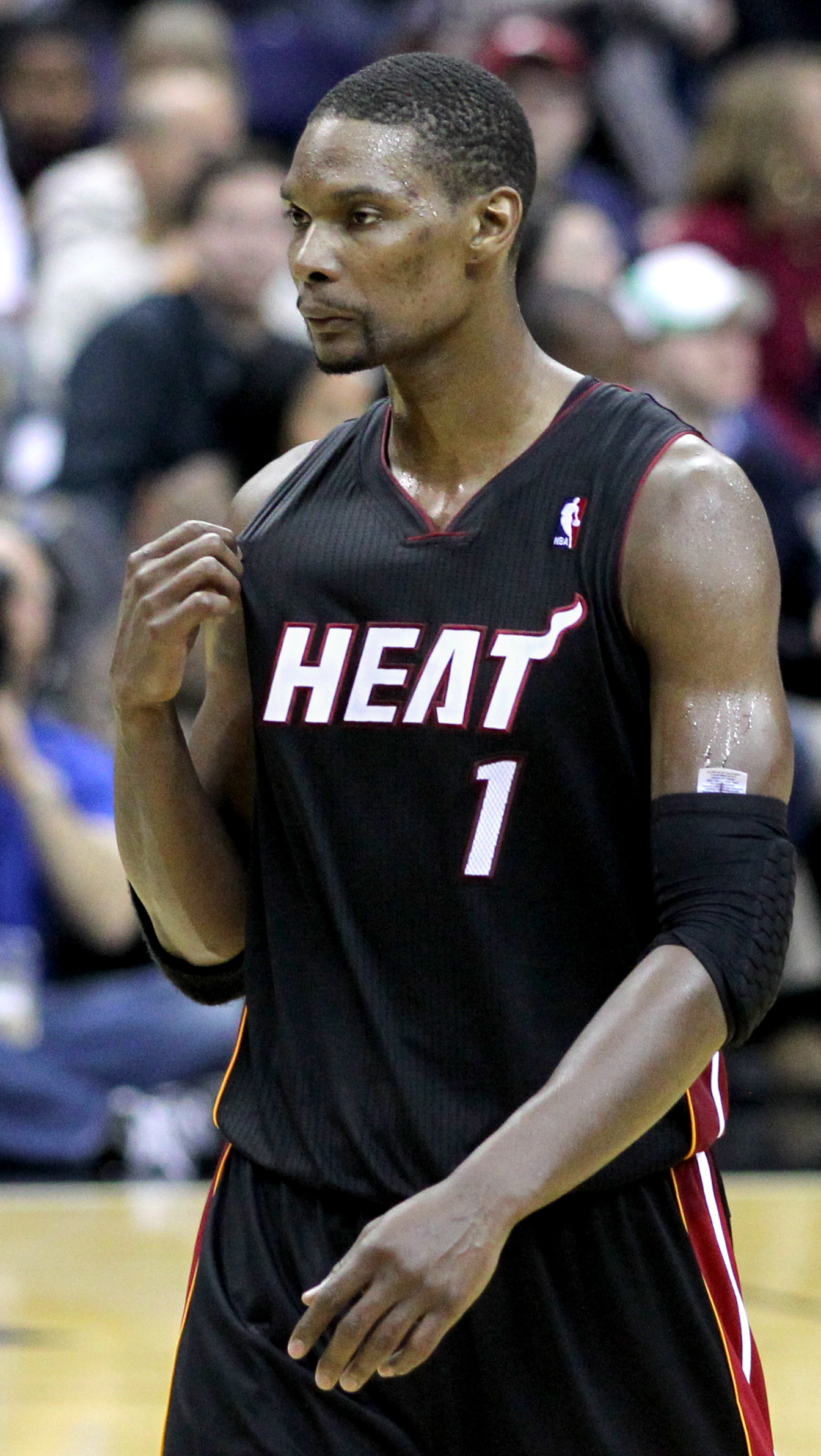
Chris Bosh

The Big Three, also known as the Heatles, were a trio of professional basketball players – LeBron James, Dwyane Wade, and Chris Bosh – who formed the core of a superteam for the Miami Heat of the National Basketball Association (NBA) from the 2010–11 season to the 2013–14 season. James, Bosh, and Wade had been selected as the 1st, 4th, and 5th picks in the 2003 NBA draft, and became scoring leaders for their respective franchises over their first seven seasons.

During the trio's four seasons together, the Heat advanced to the NBA Finals each year and won two NBA championships. James won NBA Most Valuable Player awards in 2012 and 2013 and was named to the All-NBA First Team in all four seasons, while Wade was All-NBA Second Team in 2011 and All-NBA Third Team in 2012 and 2013. All three of Bosh, Wade, and James were NBA All-Stars during all four seasons together.

== History ==
=== Origins ===
All three players were part of the 2003 NBA Draft class, with James, a forward, selected first to the Cleveland Cavaliers, Bosh, a forward, fourth to the Toronto Raptors, and Wade, a guard, fifth to the Miami Heat. Bosh, who hails from Texas, played one season of college basketball for Georgia Tech, while James was drafted straight from St. Vincent–St. Mary High School in his hometown of Akron, Ohio. Wade (born in 1982 in Chicago, Illinois) is two years older than both Bosh and James, and played three seasons in college for Marquette University, where he led the Golden Eagles to the 2003 Final Four. The year prior to his Final Four run, Wade suffered a meniscus tear and had his meniscus removed, a surgery that came to negatively impact his longevity in the NBA a decade later.

Wade quickly became a star with the Heat, and teamed up with veteran star Shaquille O'Neal to lead the team to the 2005–06 NBA championship over the Dallas Mavericks, winning Finals MVP in only his third season. Though James's Cavaliers teams were known for weak supporting casts, he led them to the 2007 NBA Finals but was swept by the San Antonio Spurs. He won back-to-back NBA Most Valuable Player awards in 2008–09 and 2009–10. Bosh earned All-Star and All-NBA nods on middling Raptors teams.

=== Joining forces ===
Bosh, James, and Wade began discussing a potential team-up as early as 2006, when all three were still on rookie contracts. According to Brian Windhorst's reporting, Miami Heat president Pat Riley, who had experience with NBA super-teams as former coach of the Showtime Los Angeles Lakers, had been laying the groundwork for a play at James and Bosh for years, including by purposely cost-cutting in the 2007–08 and 2008–09 seasons. Several other teams, most notably the New York Knicks, had done the same in hopes of attracting at least two of the three.

A crucial moment came during the 2009–10 season, when Riley met with James, then still with the Cavaliers, before a game alongside Michael Jordan, to discuss how current players could honor Jordan's legacy. The Heat had retired Jordan's jersey #23, though he had never played for the team. Shortly afterwards, James said in an interview that he would honor Jordan by no longer wearing jersey #23. According to reporter Brian Windhorst, this moment provided a blueprint for Riley on how to appeal to James's emotions, which later became the basis of Riley's free-agent pitch to James.

By the summer of 2010, when all three were set to be free agents, there were significant rumors surrounding two or three of Wade, James, and Bosh teaming up. The three reportedly held a pre-free agency summit together in Miami just days before the free agent window opened.

The group strongly considered joining the Chicago Bulls together, as they had massive salary cap space alongside rising star Derrick Rose, who was on an affordable rookie contract. James also reportedly initially attempted to convince Bosh to join him in Cleveland. Ultimately, it was Bosh who moved first and chose to sign in Miami. This convinced Wade to follow suit and re-sign with the Heat.

This left James to make his final decision alone, largely between Miami and Cleveland, but with the New York Knicks and Chicago Bulls as dark horses. Riley and Miami had offered maximum accommodations for James's personal friends in the Heat organization, compared to others, continuing the approach that had helped him land Shaquille O'Neal to team with Wade for the 2006 title team. James's close friend Chris Paul was among those who reportedly urged him to consider staying in Cleveland.

James announced his decision to sign with Miami in the controversial television special The Decision, with the quote "I'm going to take my talents to South Beach," which became an Internet meme. Fans in Cleveland burned James' jersey after the televised announcement, while Cavaliers owner Dan Gilbert issued a public letter in the Comic Sans font calling James "the self-declared former 'King'" and declaring that "I personally guarantee that the Cleveland Cavaliers will win an NBA Championship before the self-titled former 'king' wins one", a prediction that did not come true.

Led by James (aged 25), Bosh (aged 26), and Wade (aged 28), all in the prime of their careers, the Heat were seen as title favorites for the foreseeable future. In a press conference days later to introduce the team's new star trio, James played into this new role by declaring his prediction that the group would win numerous titles, promising "not one, not two, not three, not four, not five, not six, not seven" championships for the group, a quote that became infamous.

=== "Heatles" nickname ===
James first referred to the trio as "the Heatles" after a 96–82 road victory over the Charlotte Bobcats on January 3, 2011, comparing the three stars to the Beatles for drawing strong road attendance. "I see we sell out 99.1 percent on the road, so we call ourselves the Heatles off the Beatles, so every time we take our show on the road we bring a great crowd," James said. The term was criticized immediately by the media. Business Insider derided it as "stupid", while NBC Sports said, "It's just too early for this — the Beatles are the most successful rock band of all time and you guys have yet to really do anything except look good in December. You haven't even been on Ed Sullivan yet." Despite the criticism, the nickname caught on, and eventually became part of the team's legacy, with Tyrese Haliburton referring to the team by this nickname in 2025.

=== Big Three run ===
The trio led the Heat to the NBA Finals in each of their four seasons together, three of which came against teams James and Wade had faced in the finals earlier in their careers — the Dallas Mavericks and San Antonio Spurs. Throughout the Big Three's run, they were coached by Erik Spoelstra, with the coaching veteran Riley as the team president. Due to the enormous salaries required to retain the Big Three stars, the rest of the team's roster was composed of younger players on rookie contracts (including Mario Chalmers and Norris Cole) and late-career veterans who signed affordable deals for a chance at a championship, including Udonis Haslem, Juwan Howard, Chris Andersen, Greg Oden, Ray Allen, Mike Miller, and Joel Anthony.

In the 2011 NBA Finals, their first season together, though the Heat were favored to win the title, they were defeated by the Dallas Mavericks and star Dirk Nowitzki. James was often reviled by fans for his move to Miami, and had a reputation as a "choker", purportedly playing at his worst in critical late-game situations, at the time.

In 2012, James won his third league MVP award in four years (the 2011 award had gone to Derrick Rose) and the Heat prevailed in a challenging conference finals against the experienced Boston Celtics, with their own Big Three. After going down 3-2 in the series and trailing in Game 6, James led a comeback, and his performance helped him to shed the "choker" label. James later said he had been worried that Heat president Pat Riley would break up the team if they had lost again. The Heat returned to the Finals, this time facing a younger opponent: the upstart Oklahoma City Thunder, led by Kevin Durant, Russell Westbrook and James Harden. The Heat dispatched the Thunder in five games, marking James's first NBA title at age 27, as well as Bosh's first title and Wade's second.

In 2013, the Heat once again advanced to the NBA Finals and faced the San Antonio Spurs, among the dynasties of the 2000s and previously undefeated in the NBA Finals under coach Gregg Popovich and star Tim Duncan, and now featuring rising star Kawhi Leonard. The Spurs came within minutes of clinching the title in Game 6, but a late Heat run capped by a Ray Allen three sent the game to overtime, where the Heat won narrowly, in what James called "the best game I've ever been a part of". The Heat would go on to win Game 7 narrowly and clinch their second straight title.

The following season, the Spurs finished with the NBA's best record, and marched back to the Finals for a rematch with the Heat. By Duncan's admission, the Spurs were motivated to avenge their 2013 loss. The Spurs won the 2014 NBA Finals in resounding fashion, with a 4-1 victory.

=== Conclusion and aftermath ===
The Heat's Game 5 loss to the Spurs in 2014 ended up being the Big Three's last game together. After the resounding loss to the Spurs, media attention focused on the athletic decline of Dwyane Wade, who had dealt with knee issues since his meniscus tear and meniscus removal surgery in his college years. Wade himself later said that he was "outside of [his] prime" by 2014, and that he is unsure whether the Heat Big Three could've made a title run had they stayed together in 2015.

With the status of his co-star in question, and with other tensions with Heat management (exemplified by an infamous story in which Riley banned chocolate chip cookies, a favorite indulgence of James's, from the team plane), James chose to depart Miami and return to the Cleveland Cavaliers, ending the Big Three era in Miami. James's Cavaliers would go on to make four consecutive NBA finals appearances, marking a streak of eight consecutive finals appearances for James-led teams between 2011–2018, unparalleled in the modern era. James would continue to play at an All-NBA level for more than a decade after leaving Miami.

In contrast, Wade and Bosh never fully returned to form after the Big Three era. The pair would play two more seasons together in Miami after James's departure. Though Bosh initially performed well in an increased role for the Heat after James's departure, he endured a severe blood-clotting condition beginning in 2015 that became career-ending. He played his last NBA game on February 9, 2016, and retired several years later after attempting a comeback. The Heat missed the 2015 playoffs entirely, and earned the third seed in the East in 2016 but lost in the second round of the playoffs with Bosh sidelined by his medical condition.

Wade continued to experience athletic decline, and left the Heat in 2016 for his hometown Chicago Bulls. In 2017, he signed with the Cavaliers, reuniting with James in Cleveland for half a season before ultimately being traded back to Miami, where he played a farewell season before retiring in 2019. Both Bosh and Wade had their jersey numbers retired by the Heat.

== Legacy ==
The trio have been credited with a dramatic influence on the NBA, especially in team development and general management. In subsequent seasons, several other teams sought to adopt the "Big Three" model of opening large amounts of salary cap space to court established NBA superstars to their franchises, in order to win championships. The NBA's most recent collective bargaining agreement, which has made it more difficult to build a team around multiple high-salary superstars, can be viewed as a response to the dominance of superteams like the Heat and the Golden State Warriors in the 2010s. The team's play influenced later NBA superstars including Tyrese Haliburton, who called them his favorite childhood team.

== Records and statistics ==
=== Season-by-season team record ===
Note: GP = Games played, W = Wins, L = Losses, W–L% = Winning percentage

Season	GP	W	L	W–L%	Finish	Playoffs
2010–11	82	58	24	.707	1st in Southeast	Lost NBA Finals, 4–2 (Mavericks)
2011–12	66	46	20	.697	1st in Southeast	Won NBA Finals, 4–1 (Thunder)
2012–13	82	66	16	.805	1st in Southeast	Won NBA Finals, 4–3 (Spurs)
2013–14	82	54	28	.659	1st in Southeast	Lost NBA Finals, 4–1 (Spurs)

=== Season-by-season player statistics ===
Legend
GP	Games played	GS	Games started	MPG	Minutes per game
FG%	Field-goal percentage	3P%	3-point field-goal percentage	FT%	Free-throw percentage
RPG	Rebounds per game	APG	Assists per game	SPG	Steals per game
BPG	Blocks per game	PPG	Points per game

Led team

==== 2010–11 regular season ====
Player	GP	GS	MPG	FG%	3FG%	FT%	RPG	APG	SPG	BPG	PPG
Chris Bosh	77	77	36.3	.496	.240	.815	8.3	1.9	0.77	0.64	18.7
LeBron James	79	79	38.8	.510	.330	.759	7.5	7.0	1.57	0.63	26.7
Dwyane Wade	76	76	37.1	.500	.306	.758	6.4	4.6	1.46	1.14	25.5

==== 2011 playoffs ====
Player	GP	GS	MPG	FG%	3FG%	FT%	RPG	APG	SPG	BPG	PPG
Chris Bosh	21	21	39.7	.474	.000	.814	8.5	1.1	0.71	0.90	18.6
LeBron James	21	21	43.9	.466	.353	.763	8.4	5.9	1.67	1.19	23.7
Dwyane Wade	21	21	39.4	.485	.269	.777	7.1	4.4	1.62	1.33	24.5

==== 2011–12 regular season ====
Player	GP	GS	MPG	FG%	3FG%	FT%	RPG	APG	SPG	BPG	PPG
Chris Bosh	57	57	35.2	.487	.286	.821	7.9	1.8	0.89	0.79	18.0
LeBron James	62	62	37.5	.531	.362	.771	7.9	6.2	1.85	0.81	27.1
Dwyane Wade	49	49	33.2	.497	.268	.791	4.8	4.6	1.67	1.29	22.1

==== 2012 playoffs ====
Player	GP	GS	MPG	FG%	3FG%	FT%	RPG	APG	SPG	BPG	PPG
Chris Bosh	14	10	31.4	.493	.538	.827	7.8	0.6	0.43	1.00	14.0
LeBron James	23	23	42.7	.500	.259	.739	9.7	5.6	1.87	0.70	30.3
Dwyane Wade	23	23	39.4	.462	.294	.729	5.2	4.3	1.70	1.30	22.8

==== 2012–13 regular season ====
Player	GP	GS	MPG	FG%	3FG%	FT%	RPG	APG	SPG	BPG	PPG
Chris Bosh	74	74	33.2	.535	.284	.798	6.8	1.7	0.9	1.4	16.6
LeBron James	76	76	37.9	.565	.406	.753	8.0	7.3	1.7	0.9	26.8
Dwyane Wade	69	69	34.7	.521	.258	.725	5.0	5.1	1.9	0.8	21.2

==== 2013 playoffs ====
Player	GP	GS	MPG	FG%	3FG%	FT%	RPG	APG	SPG	BPG	PPG
Chris Bosh	23	23	32.7	.458	.405	.733	7.3	1.5	1.0	1.6	12.1
LeBron James	23	23	41.7	.491	.375	.777	8.4	6.6	1.8	0.8	25.9
Dwyane Wade	22	22	35.5	.457	.250	.750	4.6	4.8	1.7	1.0	15.9

==== 2013–14 regular season ====
Player	GP	GS	MPG	FG%	3FG%	FT%	RPG	APG	SPG	BPG	PPG
Chris Bosh	79	79	32	.516	.339	.820	6.6	1.1	1.0	1.0	16.2
LeBron James	77	77	37.7	.567	.379	.750	6.9	6.3	1.6	0.3	27.1
Dwyane Wade	54	53	32.9	.545	.281	.733	4.5	4.7	1.5	0.5	19

==== 2014 playoffs ====
Player	GP	GS	MPG	FG%	3FG%	FT%	RPG	APG	SPG	BPG	PPG
Chris Bosh	20	20	34.3	.507	.405	.750	5.6	1.1	0.9	1.0	14.9
LeBron James	20	20	38.2	.565	.407	.806	7.1	4.8	1.8	0.6	27.4
Dwyane Wade	20	20	34.7	.500	.375	.767	3.9	3.9	1.5	0.3	17.8

== Individual Honors ==
Honors listed are only for the years the Big Three were together.

NBA Most Valuable Player

- James – 2012, 2013

NBA Finals Most Valuable Player

- James – 2012, 2013

Best NBA Player ESPY Award

- James – 2012, 2013

NBA Community Assist Award

- Wade – 2013

All-NBA First Team

- James – 2011–2014

All-NBA Second Team

- Wade – 2011

All-NBA Third Team

- Wade – 2012, 2013

NBA All-Defensive First Team

- James – 2011–2013

NBA All-Defensive Second Team

- James – 2014

Season-long NBA Community Assist Award

- Wade – 2013

NBA All-Star selections

- Wade – 2011–2014
- Bosh – 2011–2014
- James – 2011–2014

NBA All-Star Shooting Stars Contest Champion

- Bosh – 2013–2014 (with Swin Cash and Dominique Wilkins)
