= Ian Mahinmi =

French basketball player (born 1986)

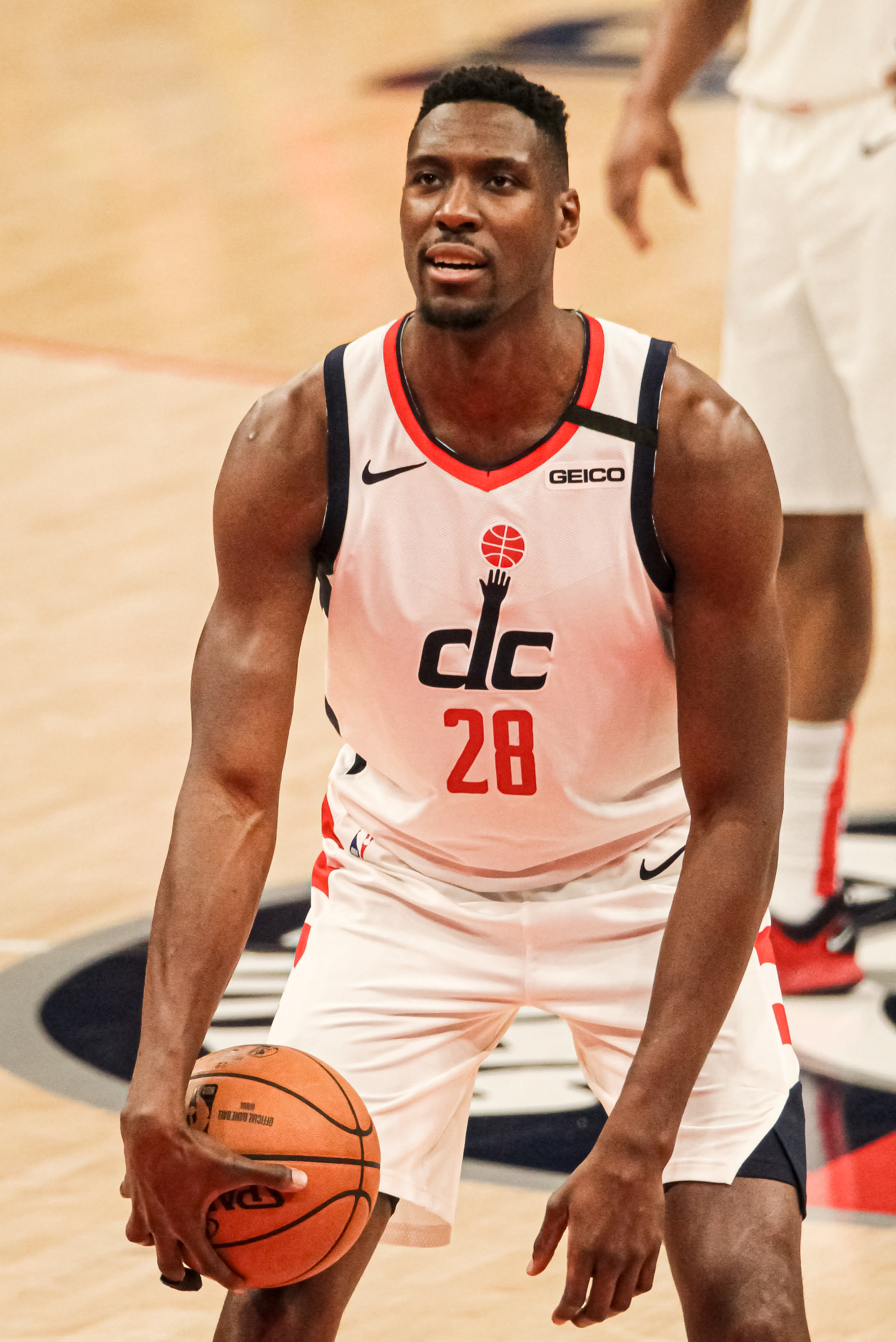
- Mahinmi with the Washington Wizards in 2020

Personal information
- Born: November 5, 1986 (age 40) Rouen, France
- Listed height: 6 ft 11 in (2.11 m)
- Listed weight: 262 lb (119 kg)

Career information
- NBA draft: 2005: 1st round, 28th overall pick
- Drafted by: San Antonio Spurs
- Playing career: 2003–2020
- Position: Center
- Number: 15, 28, 32

Career history
- 2003–2006: STB Le Havre
- 2006–2007: ÉB Pau-Orthez
- 2007–2010: San Antonio Spurs
- 2007–2009: →Austin Toros
- 2010–2012: Dallas Mavericks
- 2011: STB Le Havre
- 2012–2016: Indiana Pacers
- 2016–2020: Washington Wizards

Career highlights
- NBA champion (2011); NBA D-League All-Star (2008); All-NBA D-League First Team (2008); French Cup winner (2007)

Career statistics
- Points: 3,209 (5.2 ppg)
- Rebounds: 2,705 (4.4 rpg)
- Blocks: 443 (.7 bpg)
- Stats at NBA.com
- Stats at Basketball Reference
Medals
Men's basketball
Representing France
European U-18 Championship
Bronze medal – third place	2004 Spain	U-18 Team

Ian Mahinmi (born November 5, 1986) is a French former professional basketball player. He played the center position and was selected with the 28th overall pick in the 2005 NBA draft by the San Antonio Spurs.

== Early life ==
Mahinmi was born to a Beninese father who helped other Africans immigrate to France and a Jamaican mother who taught in a preschool. Mahinmi preferred playing soccer as a child along with his older brother, but eventually switched to playing basketball. He was 6 feet tall when he was 14 years old.

== Professional career ==
=== Le Havre (2003–2006) ===
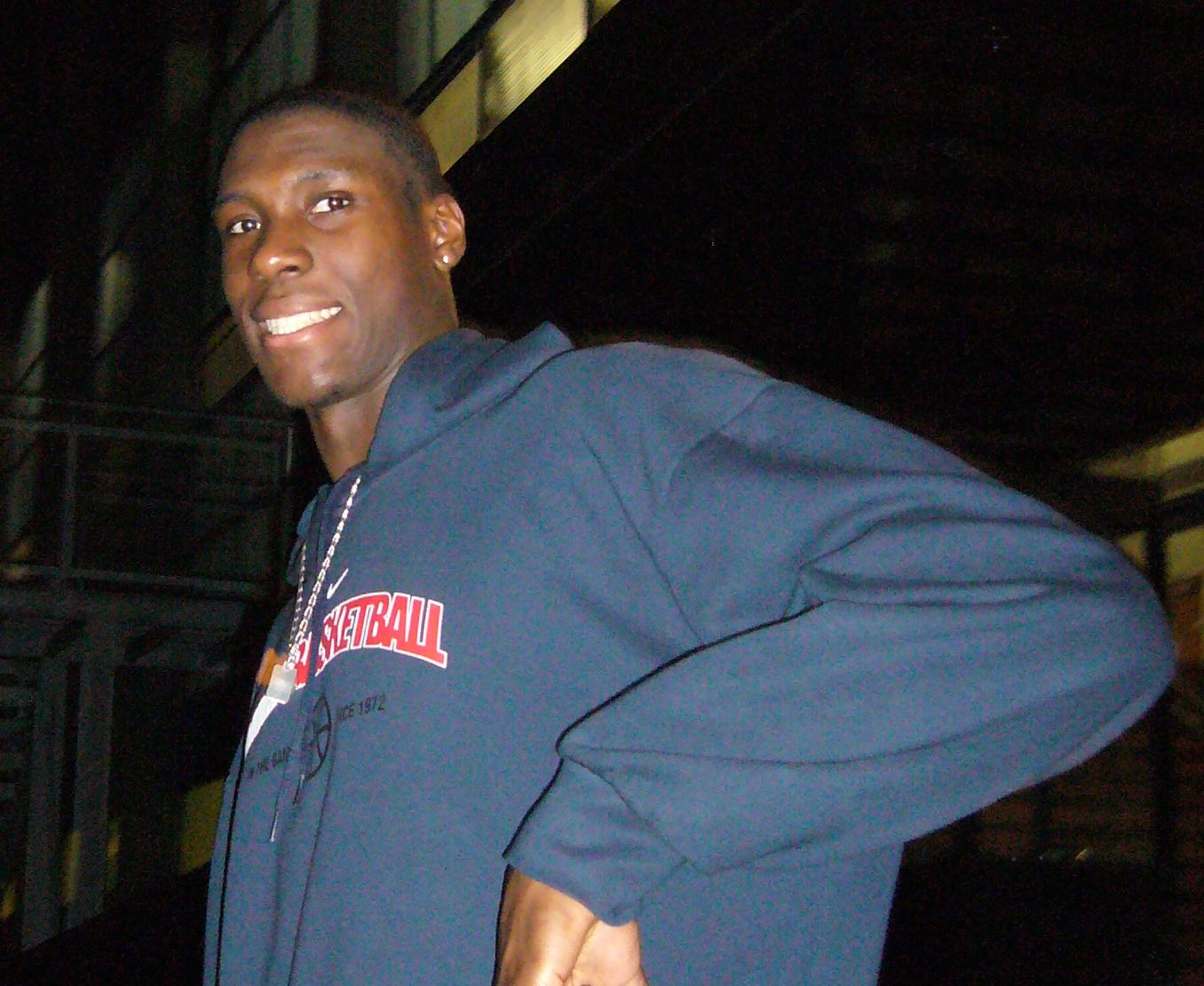
Mahinmi in 2007

Mahinmi made his impression on international scouts at the 2004 Under-18 European Championships in Zaragoza, Spain. It was there that he first caught the attention of international scouts, including San Antonio Spurs scout Sam Presti. After playing with the French national team he signed his first contract with the club STB Le Havre (France). He played three seasons with Le Havre, averaging 9.7 points and 5.2 rebounds per game in 2005–06.

=== Pau-Orthez (2006–2007) ===
In the summer of 2006, Mahinmi signed a contract to play for Pau Orthez in France's top professional league. He averaged 4.3 points and 3.2 rebounds in 12.7 minutes in the 2006–07 season, helping the team win the French Cup.

=== San Antonio Spurs (2007–2010) ===
Mahinmi was selected 28th overall in the 2005 NBA draft by the San Antonio Spurs, which surprised many other teams and league officials because he wasn't among the 128 players listed in the league's draft guide. Mahinmi was considered a "project" that would be a couple of years from competing in the NBA. The Spurs' interest in Mahinmi related to their need for an athletic big man since David Robinson retired. Playing for the Spurs' 2006 summer-league team at Rocky Mountain Revue, Mahinmi demonstrated his athleticism, but had difficulty maintaining rebounding or post position without fouling. After Mahinmi moved to Pau Orthez, which had a more developed strength and nutrition program than the one at Le Havre, the Spurs also began to send a strength coach to monitor his progress.

During the 2007 Summer League, Mahinmi tore his right pectoralis minor shortly after the start of play. Despite this setback, he was signed by the Spurs on August 23, 2007. On October 30, 2007, Mahinmi made his NBA debut with the Spurs against the Portland Trail Blazers, playing only 74 seconds and registering no statistics. Mahinmi played for the Austin Toros, the Spurs' affiliate in the NBA Development League, by November. Mahinmi averaged 17.1 points and 8.2 rebounds in the NBA Development League, leading the Austin Toros to the D-League Finals in which they lost.

=== Dallas Mavericks (2010–2012) ===
Mahinmi signed with the Dallas Mavericks on July 13, 2010. On December 7, 2010, against the Golden State Warriors, Mahinmi recorded his first career double-double (12 points and 10 rebounds in 21 minutes). On January 15, 2011, Mahinmi scored a career high 17 points in a loss to the Memphis Grizzlies, going 6–6 from the floor and 5–6 from the free throw line while collecting 6 rebounds. On March 20, 2011, Mahinmi collected a career-high 13 rebounds and 9 points after playing 20 minutes in the 101–73 win over the Golden State Warriors.

On June 12, 2011, in game 6 of the NBA Finals against the Miami Heat with Dallas leading the series 3–2, Mahinmi collected a crucial offensive rebound in the closing seconds of the 3rd quarter before hitting a buzzer beater shot to further extend the Mavericks lead. Dallas went on to win the game 105–95 and Mahinmi won his first NBA championship with the Dallas Mavericks.

During the 2011 NBA lockout, Mahinmi played four games for STB Le Havre. In December 2011, he returned to the Mavericks. He scored a career high 19 points on December 30, 2011, in a game against the Toronto Raptors as the Mavericks won their first game of the 2011–12 season. Mahinmi went 6–6 from the floor and 7–11 from the free throw line while collecting 5 rebounds.

Mahinmi recorded his first career start in a 95–86 loss to the Oklahoma City Thunder.

=== Indiana Pacers (2012–2016) ===
On July 12, 2012, Mahinmi was traded to the Indiana Pacers in exchange for Darren Collison and Dahntay Jones.

In his 2014–15 year with the Indiana Pacers, Ian recorded the lowest free throw percentage in the history of the NBA, with a percentage of 30.49%. As a result, Mahinmi almost never played in the fourth quarter as teams would intentionally foul him to get extra possessions and limiting the Pacers' Offensive rating.

On February 19, 2016, Mahinmi matched a career high with 19 points and grabbed 11 rebounds in a 101–98 win over the Oklahoma City Thunder. On March 4, 2016, Mahinmi led the Pacers with a career-high 14 rebounds and 10 points in 32 minutes in a 101–108 loss to the Charlotte Hornets. On March 27, 2016, Mahinmi helped the Pacers defeat the Houston Rockets, tying a career-high 19 points and 11 rebounds in a 104–101 win. In Game 4 of the Pacers' 2016 first-round playoff series against the Toronto Raptors, Mahinmi scored a career-high 22 points, while his 10 rebounds and five assists were both playoff career bests, as he helped the Pacers tie the series at 2–2 with a 100–83 win. In his final season with Indiana, Mahinmi recorded career highs in points (9.3), rebounds (7.1), and blocks per game (1.1).

=== Washington Wizards (2016–2020) ===
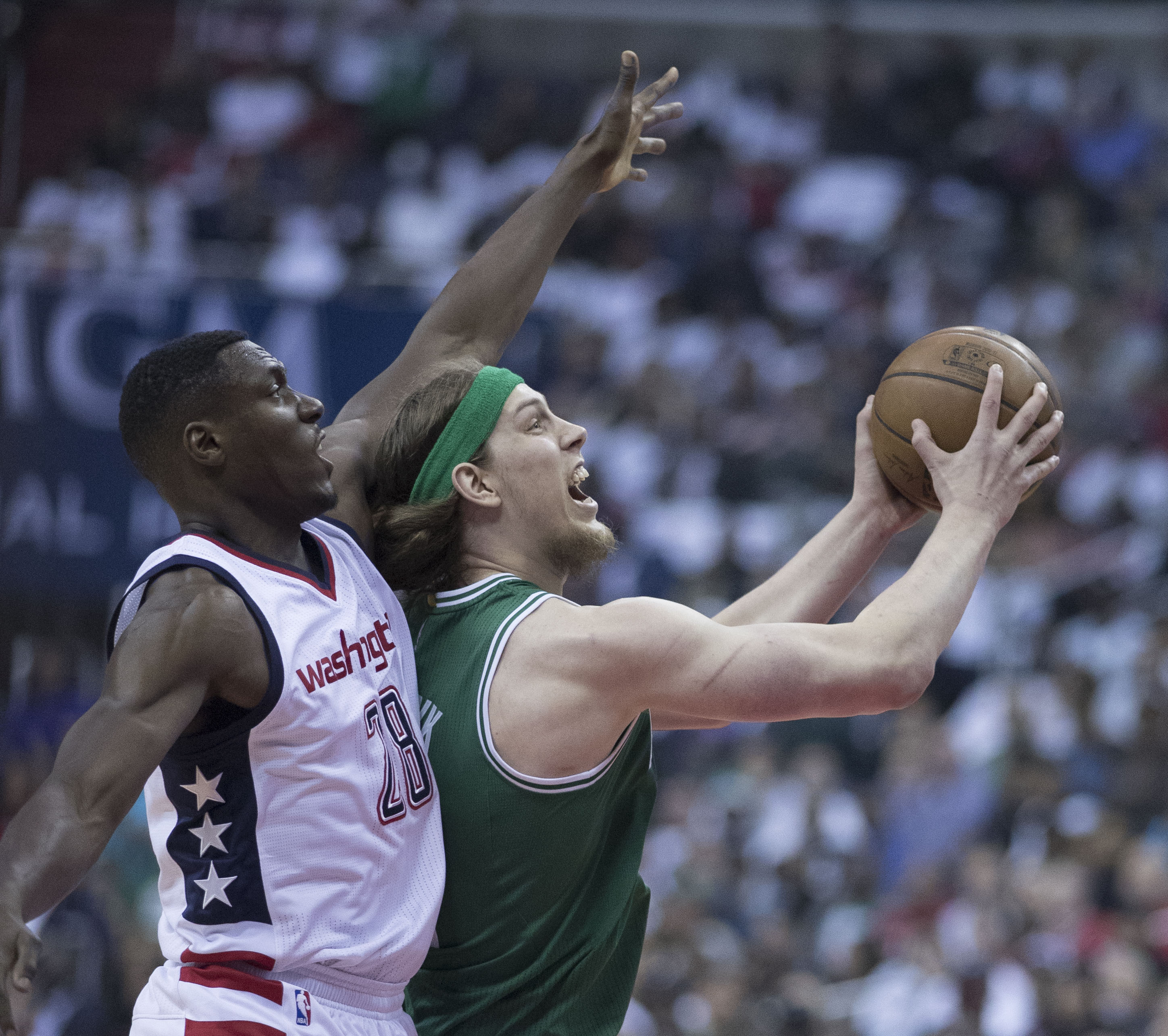
Mahinmi guards Kelly Olynyk of the Boston Celtics in 2017

On July 7, 2016, Mahinmi signed a four-year, $64 million contract with the Washington Wizards. On October 15, 2016, he was ruled out for four to six weeks after suffering a partially torn medial meniscus in his left knee. He made his debut for the Wizards on November 26, 2016, against the San Antonio Spurs after missing the first 14 games of the season while recovering from left knee surgery. He was deactivated following this game, and on December 20, he was ruled out for another six weeks after requiring more treatment on his knees. On February 8, 2017, against Brooklyn, Mahinmi played in only his second game of the season and scored his first points. On March 7, 2017, he had a career-high seven steals in a 131–127 win over the Phoenix Suns. On March 17, 2017, he had a season-high 16 points in a 112–107 win over the Chicago Bulls. On April 12, 2017, he was ruled out for the start of the postseason with a strained left calf. He returned to action in Game 3 of the Wizards' second-round series against the Boston Celtics.

On July 6, 2021, Mahinmi announced his retirement from professional basketball.

== NBA career statistics ==
Legend
GP	Games played	GS	Games started	MPG	Minutes per game
FG%	Field goal percentage	3P%	3-point field goal percentage	FT%	Free throw percentage
RPG	Rebounds per game	APG	Assists per game	SPG	Steals per game
BPG	Blocks per game	PPG	Points per game	**Bold**	Career high
†	Won an NBA championship

=== Regular season ===
Year	Team	GP	GS	MPG	FG%	3P%	FT%	RPG	APG	SPG	BPG	PPG
2007–08	San Antonio	6	0	3.8	.500	–	**1.000**	.8	.2	.0	.7	3.5
2009–10	San Antonio	26	0	6.3	**.636**	–	.660	2.0	.1	.1	.3	3.9
2010–11†	Dallas	56	0	8.7	.561	.000	.768	2.1	.1	.3	.3	3.1
2011–12	Dallas	61	12	18.7	.546	.000	.639	4.7	.2	.6	.5	5.8
2012–13	Indiana	**80**	2	16.5	.453	.000	.608	3.9	.3	.5	.8	5.0
2013–14	Indiana	77	1	16.2	.481	–	.621	3.3	.3	.5	.9	3.5
2014–15	Indiana	61	6	18.8	.552	–	.304	5.8	.5	.5	.8	4.3
2015–16	Indiana	71	**71**	**25.6**	.589	–	.587	**7.1**	**1.5**	.9	1.1	**9.3**
2016–17	Washington	31	0	17.9	.586	–	.573	4.8	.6	**1.1**	.8	5.6
2017–18	Washington	77	0	14.9	.556	.000	.703	4.1	.7	.5	.5	4.8
2018–19	Washington	34	6	14.6	.452	.188	.689	3.8	.7	.7	.5	4.1
2019–20	Washington	38	35	21.3	.495	**.192**	.619	5.7	1.3	.8	**1.2**	7.4
Career		618	133	16.8	.533	.160	.612	4.4	.6	.6	.7	5.2

=== Playoffs ===
Year	Team	GP	GS	MPG	FG%	3P%	FT%	RPG	APG	SPG	BPG	PPG
2010	San Antonio	2	0	9.5	.500	–	.750	1.0	.0	.0	.5	4.5
2011†	Dallas	6	0	5.5	.600	–	.556	1.0	.0	.2	.0	1.8
2012	Dallas	4	0	17.5	.643	–	.846	4.5	.0	.8	.8	7.3
2013	Indiana	18	0	8.3	.448	–	.300	2.3	.1	.0	.7	1.6
2014	Indiana	**19**	0	12.7	.481	–	.611	2.4	.2	.3	.8	1.9
2016	Indiana	7	**7**	**24.6**	.500	–	.600	**5.1**	1.1	**.7**	.9	**8.1**
2017	Washington	5	0	12.6	.556	–	.364	2.2	**1.2**	.2	**1.2**	2.8
2018	Washington	6	0	8.7	**.714**	–	**.909**	1.8	.2	.7	.8	5.0
Career		67	7	11.9	.527	–	.614	2.6	.3	.3	.7	3.2

== Personal life ==
Mahinmi and his wife, Alexis, have three daughters.

== See also ==
- List of European basketball players in the United States
