= Kammeyer =

Kammeyer is a German surname. Notable people with the surname include:

- Annkathrin Kammeyer (born 1990), German politician
- Bob Kammeyer (1950–2003), American baseball player

== See also ==
- Kammerer
