= Joel Anthony =

Canadian basketball player (born 1982)

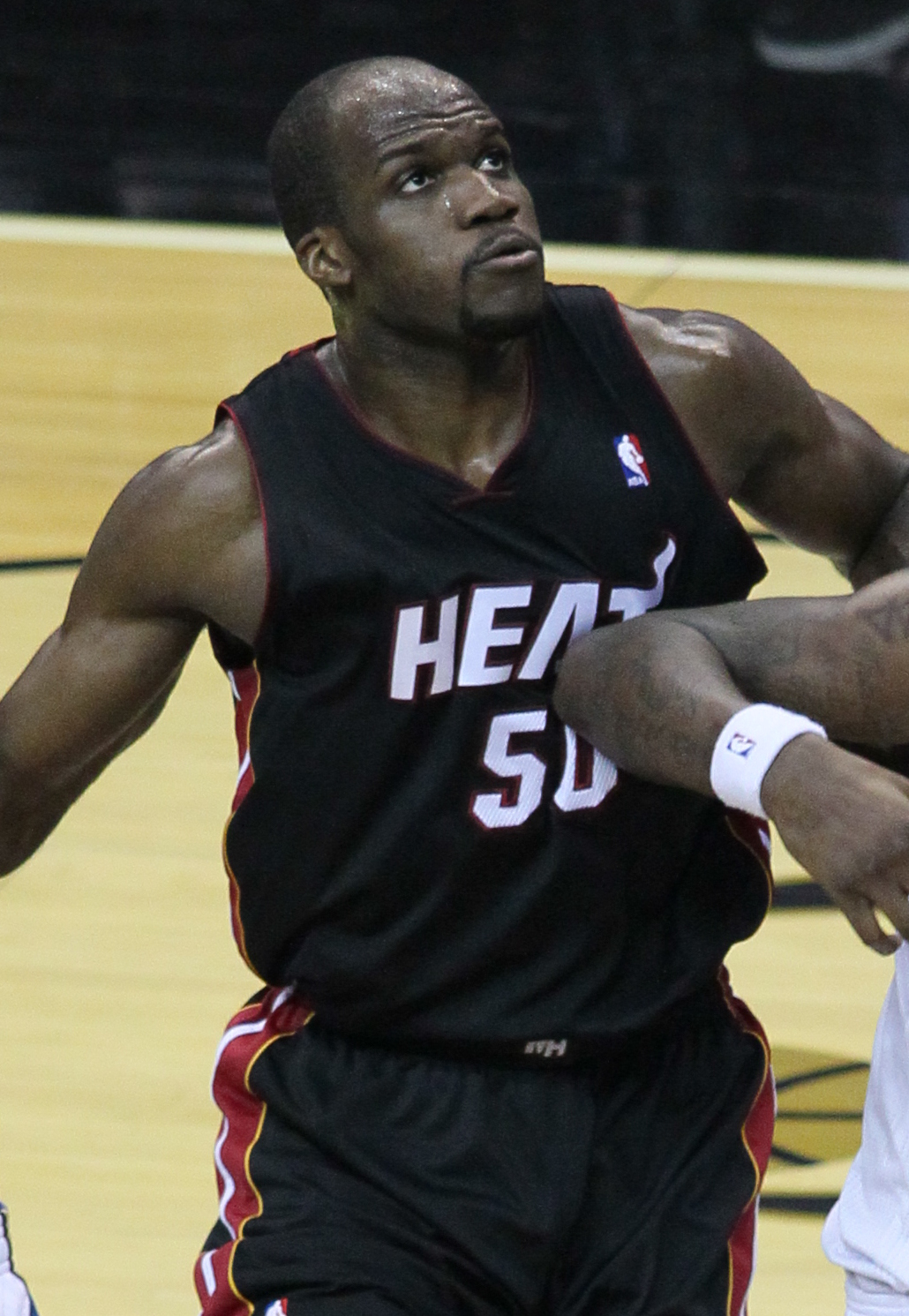
- Anthony with the Miami Heat in 2010

Montreal Alliance
- Title: General manager
- League: CEBL

Personal information
- Born: August 9, 1982 (age 44) Montreal, Quebec, Canada
- Listed height: 6 ft 9 in (2.06 m)
- Listed weight: 245 lb (111 kg)

Career information
- High school: Selwyn House (Montreal, Quebec); Emmanuel Christian (Montreal, Quebec); Dawson College (Montreal, Quebec)
- College: Pensacola (2002–2004); UNLV (2004–2007)
- NBA draft: 2007: undrafted
- Playing career: 2007–2020
- Position: Center / power forward
- Number: 50, 30

Career history
- 2007–2014: Miami Heat
- 2008: →Iowa Energy
- 2014: Boston Celtics
- 2014–2016: Detroit Pistons
- 2017: San Antonio Spurs
- 2018–2020: San Lorenzo

Career highlights
- 2× NBA champion (2012, 2013); 2× Liga de las Américas champion (2018, 2019); 2× Liga Nacional de Básquet champion (2018, 2019); MWC Defensive Player of the Year (2007)

Career NBA statistics
- Points: 1,064 (2.2 ppg)
- Rebounds: 1,353 (2.8 rpg)
- Blocks: 531 (1.1 bpg)
- Stats at NBA.com
- Stats at Basketball Reference

Joel Vincent Anthony (born August 9, 1982) is a Canadian former professional basketball player who played for the Miami Heat, Boston Celtics, Detroit Pistons, and San Antonio Spurs of the National Basketball Association (NBA). He won two championships with the Heat in 2012 and 2013. He is the Co-Owner and General manager of the Montreal Alliance of the Canadian Elite Basketball League (CEBL). Previously he was a player consultant for the Hamilton Honey Badgers. He is a former member of the Canada national team.

== College career ==
After attending Selwyn House School, Emmanuel Christian School, and Dawson College, Anthony was recruited by Pensacola Junior College in Pensacola, Florida, United States. After two years, he transferred to the University of Nevada, Las Vegas (UNLV). He led the team in blocks in his junior season in 2004–05; fourth overall in the Mountain West Conference, but redshirted the next season and did not play.

Returning to help lead the Runnin' Rebels to a 30–7 season his senior year (2006–07), he was named Mountain West Conference defensive player of the year after finishing second in the NCAA's Division I in blocks-per-40-minutes (6.77), and first in the conference in blocked shots, blocks per game, and defensive win shares. (The D–I leader, Mickell Gladness, later became Anthony's Miami Heat teammate.) The highlight in Anthony's senior year was his only double-double of the season, a season-high 13-block, 11-rebound effort versus Texas Christian on February 7, 2007.

== Professional career ==
=== Miami Heat (2007–2014) ===
He signed a one-year deal (with an option for a second) with Miami in July 2007. He made 24 appearances that season, averaging 3.5 points and 3.9 rebounds. The following year Anthony made his NBA playoff debut during Miami's first-round series with the Atlanta Hawks. Miami lost the series 4–3. He was re-signed by the Heat in July 2009.

With Miami's high-profile free agent signings of LeBron James and Chris Bosh in July 2010 much hype surrounded the team with its new self-proclaimed "Big Three". On July 16, 2010, Joel Anthony re-signed with the Miami Heat on a five-year, $18 million deal. On January 9, 2011, in 29 minutes of play against the Portland Trail Blazers, Anthony recorded zero counting stats and 4 personal fouls, setting an NBA record for most playing time in a game without recording a point, rebound, assist, steal or block. Miami finished the 2010–11 NBA season second in the Eastern Conference behind the Chicago Bulls with a 58–24 record. The Heat cruised through the first three rounds of the playoffs before losing to the Dallas Mavericks 4–2 during the 2011 NBA Finals. Anthony averaged 1.3 points, 3.5 rebounds, and 20.5 minutes per game during the NBA Finals.

The following season, Joel won his first NBA title with the Miami Heat against the Oklahoma City Thunder in five games.

Anthony won his second championship on June 20, 2013, when the Heat defeated the San Antonio Spurs in an intense seven game series. In the series, Anthony put up 2 points while playing 3.7 minutes.

=== Boston Celtics (2014) ===
On January 15, 2014, a three-team trade was completed involving the Miami Heat, the Boston Celtics, and the Golden State Warriors. The Heat sent Anthony, a protected future draft pick received from Philadelphia in an earlier trade, and a 2016 second-round draft pick to the Celtics. In exchange, the Heat received Toney Douglas from the Warriors. The Warriors also received Jordan Crawford and MarShon Brooks from the Celtics as part of the deal.

=== Detroit Pistons (2014–2016) ===
On October 17, 2014, Anthony was traded to the Detroit Pistons in exchange for Will Bynum. In 49 games for the Pistons in 2014–15, he averaged 1.8 points and 1.9 rebounds in 8.3 minutes per game.

On July 20, 2015, Anthony re-signed with the Pistons. On February 18, 2016, Anthony was traded to the Philadelphia 76ers in a three-team trade involving the Pistons and the Houston Rockets, where Anthony and a 2017 second-round pick went to Philadelphia, Donatas Motiejūnas and Marcus Thornton to Detroit, and the rights to Chukwudiebere Maduabum and a 2016 first-round pick to Houston. However, four days later, the Pistons rescinded their trade following a failed physical by Motiejūnas, forcing Anthony to return to the Pistons. On July 10, 2016, he was waived by the Pistons.

=== San Antonio Spurs (2017) ===
After spending preseason with the San Antonio Spurs in October 2016, Anthony returned to the team in January 2017, signing a 10-day contract on January 23. He made his debut for the Spurs that night, recording four rebounds in five minutes off the bench in a 112–86 win over the Brooklyn Nets. He signed a second 10-day contract with the Spurs on February 2, then a rest-of-season contract on February 12.

=== Milwaukee Bucks (2017) ===
On September 24, 2017, Anthony signed with the Milwaukee Bucks. He was waived on October 14 as one of the team's final preseason roster cuts.

=== San Lorenzo de Almagro (2018–2020) ===
On February 27, 2018, Anthony signed with San Lorenzo of Argentina's Liga Nacional de Básquetbol (LNB), as a temporary replacement for injured power forward-center Matías Sandes. On October 29, 2018, Anthony re-signed with San Lorenzo as a replacement for Eric Dawson.

== National team career ==
During the summer of 2006, Anthony was selected to join the Canadian senior national team and participated with the squad, touring three European countries: Italy, Germany, and Slovenia.

Anthony made his national team debut in the summer of 2008. He made a tremendous impact on the court for the Canadians, by setting both scoring and shot-blocking records for an individual game. However, Canada failed to qualify for the Beijing Olympics.

The following summer, Anthony participated in the 2009 FIBA Americas Championship. He helped lead Canada to a 4th-place finish, losing in the bronze medal game to Argentina. Anthony had his best performance in Canada's semi-final loss to Brazil, in which he posted team-highs with 17 points and 8 rebounds.

In the summer of 2010, Anthony once again competed for Canada in the 2010 FIBA World Championship. Canada lost all five of their games played, their worst ever performance in the international tournament.

In August 2013, Anthony was again named to the Canadian national team, playing in the 2013 FIBA Americas Championship.

== Post-playing career ==
On May 21, 2020, the Hamilton Honey Badgers of the Canadian Elite Basketball League (CEBL) announced that they had appointed Anthony as player consultant.

== Personal life ==
Anthony was raised by a single mother. His mother is Erene Anthony from the island of Antigua, who he listed on his biography as the person that made a difference in his life because she has been an inspiration to him. He also has a sister, Charlotte Pryce. He was able to attend Selwyn House School, a private school in Westmount, with the support of financial aid. He graduated from UNLV in December 2006 with a degree in university studies, and majoring in sociology and physical education.

He is commonly referred to as "The Warden" by fans. The nickname started gaining traction on Twitter after the Heat beat the Knicks in New York on December 17, 2010, and fans credited Anthony for "locking up" Amar'e Stoudemire. However, his teammates refer to him as "Doc".

== Career statistics ==
Legend
| GP | Games played | GS | Games started | MPG | Minutes per game |
| FG% | Field goal percentage | 3P% | 3-point field goal percentage | FT% | Free throw percentage |
| RPG | Rebounds per game | APG | Assists per game | SPG | Steals per game |
| BPG | Blocks per game | PPG | Points per game | **Bold** | Career high |
| † | Won an NBA championship | * | Led the league |

=== NBA ===
==== Regular season ====
| Year | Team | GP | GS | MPG | FG% | 3P% | FT% | RPG | APG | SPG | BPG | PPG |
|---|---|---|---|---|---|---|---|---|---|---|---|---|
| 2007–08 | Miami | 24 | 1 | 20.8 | .467 | – | .592 | **3.9** | .1 | .4 | 1.3 | **3.5** |
| 2008–09 | Miami | 65 | 28 | 16.1 | .483 | – | .652 | 3.0 | **.4** | .3 | **1.4** | 2.2 |
| 2009–10 | Miami | **80** | 16 | 16.5 | .478 | – | .717 | 3.1 | .2 | .3 | **1.4** | 2.7 |
| 2010–11 | Miami | 75 | 11 | 19.5 | .535 | – | .644 | 3.6 | .3 | .1 | 1.2 | 2.0 |
| 2011–12† | Miami | 64 | **51** | **21.1** | .559 | – | .690 | **3.9** | .1 | **.6** | 1.3 | 3.4 |
| 2012–13† | Miami | 62 | 3 | 9.1 | .515 | – | .607 | 1.9 | .2 | .2 | .7 | 1.4 |
| 2013–14 | Miami | 12 | 0 | 3.1 | .333 | – | **1.000** | .6 | .0 | .0 | .3 | .5 |
| 2013–14 | Boston | 21 | 0 | 7.1 | .385 | – | .333 | 1.5 | .1 | .1 | .4 | 1.0 |
| 2014–15 | Detroit | 49 | 0 | 8.3 | .581 | – | .682 | 1.9 | .1 | .2 | 1.0 | 1.8 |
| 2015–16 | Detroit | 19 | 0 | 5.1 | .600 | – | .750 | 1.1 | .1 | .1 | .6 | .9 |
| 2016–17 | San Antonio | 19 | 0 | 6.4 | **.625** | – | .625 | 1.6 | .2 | .1 | .3 | 1.3 |
| Career | | 490 | 110 | 14.4 | .513 | – | .662 | 2.8 | .2 | .3 | 1.1 | 2.2 |

==== Playoffs ====
| Year | Team | GP | GS | MPG | FG% | 3P% | FT% | RPG | APG | SPG | BPG | PPG |
|---|---|---|---|---|---|---|---|---|---|---|---|---|
| 2009 | Miami | 6 | 2 | 14.7 | **.800** | – | **1.000** | 3.2 | .3 | .0 | 1.2 | 1.7 |
| 2010 | Miami | 5 | 0 | 15.8 | .714 | – | .750 | 1.8 | .2 | **.4** | 1.0 | 2.6 |
| 2011 | Miami | **21*** | **13** | **27.4** | .367 | – | .710 | **4.6** | **.5** | **.4** | **1.8** | 2.8 |
| 2012† | Miami | 17 | 1 | 19.4 | .586 | – | .800 | 3.2 | .1 | .3 | .9 | **3.2** |
| 2013† | Miami | 14 | 0 | 5.1 | .300 | – | – | 1.5 | .0 | .1 | .3 | .4 |
| 2017 | San Antonio | 3 | 0 | 5.2 | .750 | – | .000 | 1.3 | .0 | .0 | .7 | 2.0 |
| Career | | 66 | 16 | 17.5 | .481 | – | .746 | 3.1 | .2 | .3 | 1.1 | 2.2 |

=== NBA D-League ===
==== Regular season ====
| Year | Team | GP | GS | MPG | FG% | 3P% | FT% | RPG | APG | SPG | BPG | PPG |
|---|---|---|---|---|---|---|---|---|---|---|---|---|
| 2007–08 | Iowa | 3 | 3 | 24.3 | .450 | – | .500 | 6.7 | .0 | .3 | 4.0 | 8.0 |

=== College ===
| Year | Team | GP | GS | MPG | FG% | 3P% | FT% | RPG | APG | SPG | BPG | PPG |
|---|---|---|---|---|---|---|---|---|---|---|---|---|
| 2004–05 | UNLV | 31 | 3 | 13.6 | .500 | – | .483 | 2.7 | .2 | .2 | 1.5 | 1.9 |
| 2006–07 | UNLV | **37** | **6** | **18.1** | **.597** | – | **.604** | **4.1** | **.4** | **.5** | **2.9** | **5.2** |
| Career | | 68 | 9 | 16.1 | .573 | – | .561 | 3.5 | .3 | .4 | 2.3 | 3.7 |

== See also ==
- List of Canadians in the National Basketball Association
- List of NCAA Division I men's basketball players with 13 or more blocks in a game
- List of Montreal athletes
- List of people from Montreal
