= Kammerer =

Kammerer is a German surname. Notable people with the surname include:

- Axel Kammerer (born 1964), German ice hockey player
- Bernhard Kammerer (born 1962), Italian luger
- Carl Kammerer (born 1937), American football player
- Chad Kammerer (born 1967), American basketball coach
- Charlene P. Kammerer (born 1948), bishop of The United Methodist Church
- Christel Kammerer, German management consultant
- Felix Kammerer (born 1995), Austrian actor
- Gladys Kammerer (1909–1970), American political scientist
- Kent Kammerer (1933–2011), American teacher and activist
- Manfred Kammerer (born 1944), German footballer
- Matthew Kammerer, American chef and restaurateur
- Paul Kammerer (1880–1926), Austrian zoologist
- Paul T. Kammerer Jr. (c. 1887–1939), American lawyer and politician
- Zoltán Kammerer (born 1978), Hungarian sprint canoer

Kämmerer:

- Fred Kämmerer (born 1934), German wrestler
- Gerlinde Kämmerer (born 1955), German cultural scientist
- Hans Kämmerer (born 1937), German sailor

Fictional character:

- Maxim Kammerer, a fictional character from Strugatsky's Noon Universe

== See also ==
- 112233 Kammerer, an asteroid
- Cammerer (disambiguation)
