= 2010–11 Miami Heat season =

NBA professional basketball team season

- Conference champions
- Division champions
- Head coach: Erik Spoelstra
- President: Pat Riley
- Owner: Micky Arison
- Arena: American Airlines Arena

Results
- Record: 58–24 (.707)
- Place: Division: 1st (Southeast); Conference: 2nd (Eastern)
- Playoff finish: NBA Finals (lost to Mavericks 2–4)
- Stats at Basketball Reference

Local media
- Television: Sun Sports
- Radio: 790 The Ticket

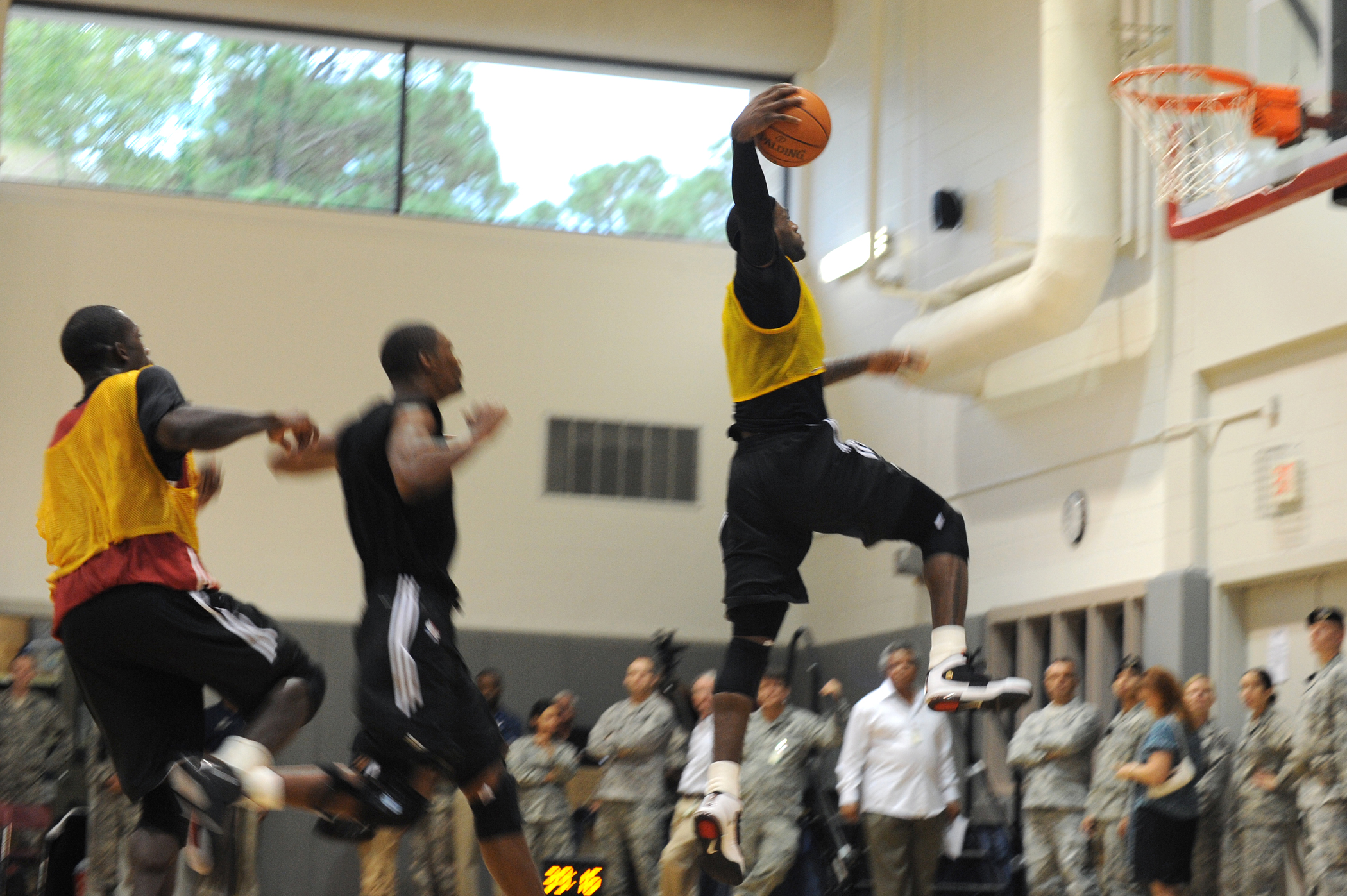
A Miami Heat practice session at the team's preseason training camp in Hurlburt Field, Florida, in late September 2010

The 2010–11 Miami Heat season was the 23rd season of the Miami Heat in the National Basketball Association (NBA). In the regular season, the Heat finished first in the Southeast Division with 58–24 record, and made the NBA playoffs for the 3rd consecutive year as the Eastern Conference's No. 2 seed (behind the Chicago Bulls).

Marked by the acquisition of perennial All-Stars LeBron James and Chris Bosh entering the 2010 NBA Free Agency period during the off-season, the Heat superteam opened the season with extraordinarily high expectations, with many observers expecting a championship in the first year of the new lineup. With Bosh, James, and Wade having been ranked among the NBA's top players for many seasons in addition to being frequently sought-after big names looking to be courted by multiple teams during the 2010 NBA Free Agency signing spree at the time, team stars and 2003 draftees Chris Bosh, Dwyane Wade and LeBron James were predicted to potentially win an NBA championship in their first season together. Miami defeated the Philadelphia 76ers in five games in the first round, then defeated LeBron’s arch-nemesis—the Boston Celtics—in the second round in five games. They then defeated the top-seeded Chicago Bulls in the Eastern Conference Finals in five games to advance to the 2011 NBA Finals. Despite entering the series as heavy favorites and taking a 2-1 series lead, they were beaten in the next three games and were upset by the Dallas Mavericks in six games, ending their hopes of winning the title.

Even though Miami's playoff run ended in disappointing fashion, the Heat nonetheless enjoyed a successful year, despite witnessing a sluggish 9–8 start to the regular season. They finished the regular season with 58 wins, won the Southeast Division, and entered the 2011 playoffs as the Eastern Conference's second seed. Pat Riley was named NBA Executive of the Year. Wade, James, and Bosh were all selected to the 2011 NBA All-Star Game, the most Heat players sent to an NBA All-Star game in franchise history. James earned All-NBA First Team honors, while Wade was bestowed with All-NBA Second Team honors.

== Key dates ==
- June 24 – The 2010 NBA draft was held in New York City.
- July 1 – The free agency negotiation period began.
- July 9 – Dwyane Wade was re-signed, while Chris Bosh and LeBron James were signed to the Heat.
- October 26 – The Heat started the regular season on the road with an 88–80 loss to the Boston Celtics.
- October 29 – The Heat defeated the Orlando Magic 96–70 in the home opener.
- February 24 – Trade deadline.
- March 10 – The Heat clinched a playoff berth for the 2011 NBA Playoffs with a 94–88 win over the Los Angeles Lakers.
- March 18 – The Heat matched their victory total of the previous season with a 106–85 win against the Atlanta Hawks.
- April 3 – The Heat clinched the Southeast Division with a 108–94 win over the New Jersey Nets and an Orlando Magic loss.
- April 10 – The Heat defeated the Boston Celtics for the first time all season, 100–77, in their last regular-season home game.
- April 11 – The Heat clinched the 2nd seed for the Eastern Conference with a 98–90 win against the Atlanta Hawks and a Boston Celtics loss.
- April 13 – The Heat regular season concluded with a 97–79 victory against the Toronto Raptors.
- April 27 – The Heat advanced to the Eastern Conference Semi-finals with a win in Game 5 of the First round against the Philadelphia 76ers with the final score 97–91.
- May 11 – The Heat advanced to the Eastern Conference finals with a win in Game 5 of the Eastern Conference Semi-finals against the Boston Celtics with the final score 97–87.
- May 26 – The Heat advanced to the NBA Finals for the first time since 2006 with a win in Game 5 of the Eastern Conference finals against the Chicago Bulls with the final score 83–80.
- June 12 – The Heat lost to the Dallas Mavericks in Game 6 of the NBA Finals and failed to capture their 2nd NBA Championship.

== Summary ==
=== Offseason ===
The Miami Heat entered the 2010 NBA Free Agency period with nearly $46 million of salary cap space to spare, allowing the team to allocate enough financial resources to gain the ability to retain free agent and franchise player Dwyane Wade, as well as being able to pair him with two other perennial All-Stars and top-ranked NBA players at the time, LeBron James and Chris Bosh. According to Fox Sports Radio's Stephen A. Smith, speaking on his show just days after the NBA draft, the Heat were "highly likely" to sign all three players. As James became an unrestricted free agent at 12:01 am EDT on July 1, 2010, his name circulated heavily during the 2010 Free Agency signing spree as he was courted by the New Jersey Nets, New York Knicks, Los Angeles Clippers, Chicago Bulls, Cleveland Cavaliers, Dallas Mavericks and the Miami Heat; all of whom in negotiations looking to potentially sign him. On July 7, 2010, Wade and Bosh both agreed to their finalized contractual terms with the Miami Heat. Then next day on July 8, 2010, James held an hour-long special to announce his decision on ESPN to commit to playing with the Heat. Later that evening, the Heat announced the trade of Michael Beasley to the Minnesota Timberwolves for a pair of second round picks and cash considerations. The three are called the SuperFriends by many sportswriters and commentators, most notably those for ESPN, because all three were taken in the top five of the 2003 NBA Draft and because they have become good friends over the years.

On July 8, 2010, it became official that NBA superstars and gold medal-winning Beijing Olympic teammates LeBron James, Dwyane Wade, and Chris Bosh would be joining Miami. The Heat completed sign-and-trade deals, sending a total of four future first-round and two-second-round picks to the Cavaliers and Raptors for James and Bosh (both signing 6 years and $110.1 million contracts). Dwyane Wade re-signed with the Heat for $107.59 million for six years. All three stars have early termination clauses in their contracts, allowing them to become free agents again in the summer of 2014. The final year on all three deals, for 2015–16, is a player option. The three made their debut at the 2010 Summer Heat Welcome Party at the American Airlines Arena on July 9, where they were introduced as The Three Kings by Heat play-by-play announcer and event co-host Eric Reid. James predicted a dynasty for the Heat and alluded to multiple championships: "Not two, not three, not four, not five, not six, not seven". Howard Beck of The New York Times described the national fan reaction to the party: "Everyone saw something: greatness, arrogance, self-indulgence, boldness, cowardice, pride, friendship, collusion, joy, cynicism, heroes, mercenaries."

By taking less than maximum salaries, Wade, James and Bosh opened the door for the Heat to further continue its roster makeover with the resigning of Udonis Haslem and signing of veteran swingman and teammate of Haslem at the University of Florida, Mike Miller for dual 5-year deals worth a combined $45 million. In order to fill the voids at forward and center, the Heat signed James's former teammate in Cleveland, Zydrunas Ilgauskas to a two-year deal for the veterans minimum at $2.8 million, resigning Joel Anthony, and signing power forward Juwan Howard. In the guard department, the Miami Heat resigned guard Carlos Arroyo and signed former Celtics player Eddie House to a two-year contract for the veteran minimum of $2.8 million. Rookies Dexter Pittman and Da'Sean Butler, along with NBA Summer League standouts Patrick Beverley and Kenny Hasbrouck, also signed contracts.

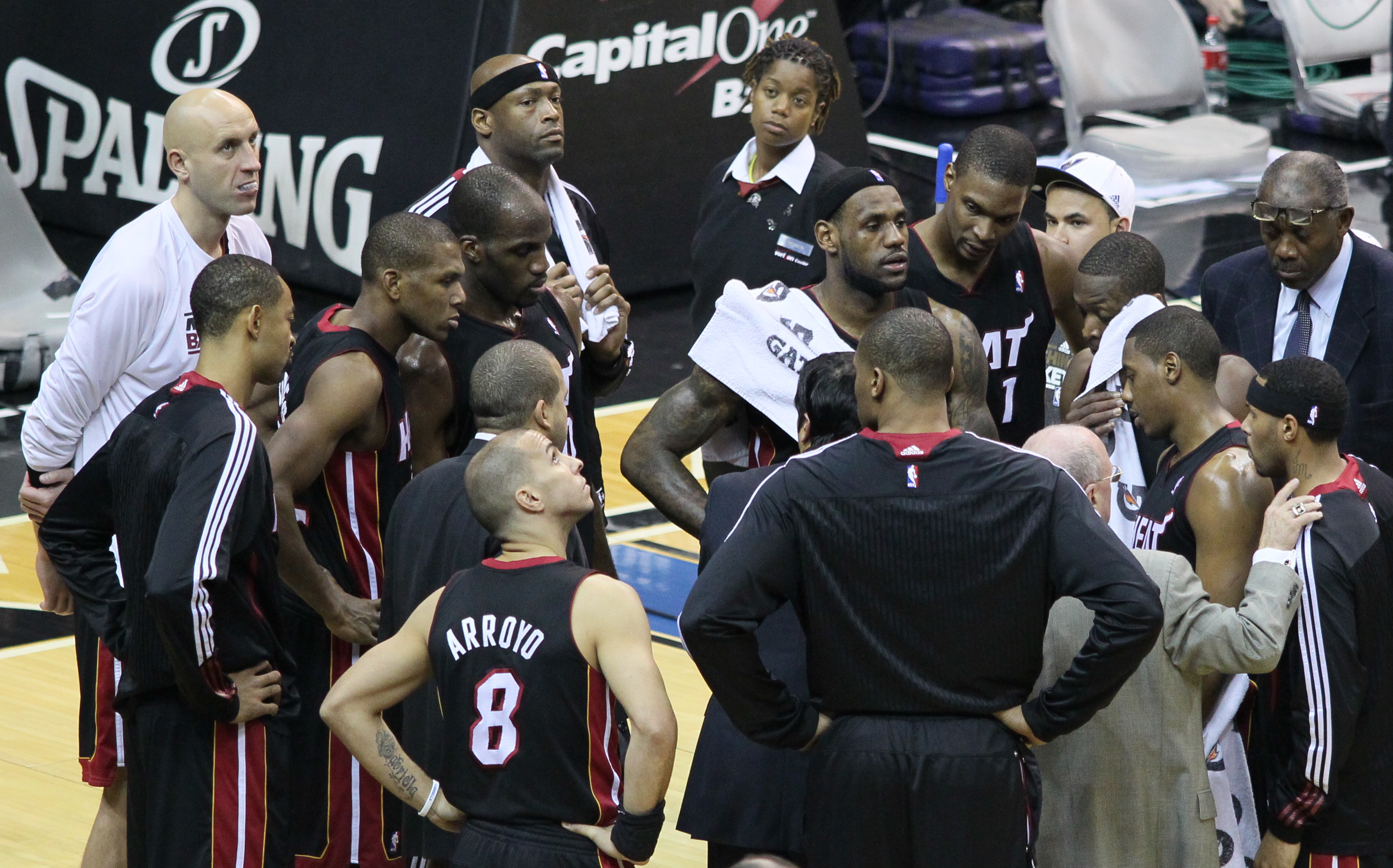
Members of the 2010–11 Miami Heat team and coaching staff during a timeout.

The Miami Heat began the regular season with much hype going into their first game against the Eastern Conference Champs, the Boston Celtics. Many considered the Miami Heat as the team to break the single season record of 72 regular season victories set by the Chicago Bulls.

=== Season ===
On the opening game of the season, broadcast on the TNT Network and featuring the debut of reigning two-time NBA MVP James in a Miami uniform alongside Chris Bosh, the game was the most-watched NBA contest ever on cable television. The game earned a 4.6 rating, delivering 7.4 million total viewers and 5.3 million households, beating the Chicago Bulls vs. Los Angeles Lakers on February 2, 1996.

The Heat lost the opening game 88–80 and got off to a 9–8 start due in large part to inconsistent play and injuries to key role players Mike Miller (thumb) and Udonis Haslem (foot). After losing four out of five games, including a Saturday night loss to the Dallas Mavericks on November 27, the team called a players-only meeting with the intent to get players to communicate with each other. Much of the speculation was that Spoelstra could lose his job and that Heat president Pat Riley would return as coach, especially after a well-publicized incident when James "bumped" into Spoelstra during a timeout.

After the players-only meeting, the team pulled together a 12-game win streak (10 of them by double digits) and limited the opposition under 100 points in all those games. During the winning streak, James led the Heat to defeat his former team by scoring 38 points (tying a Heat record for points in a quarter with 24 in the third) in a game that drew nearly 7.1 million viewers and earned a 25.4 rating in Miami. ESPN 3D aired its first NBA game in the third dimension on December 17, 2010, when the Heat defeated the New York Knicks at Madison Square Garden., The Heat set a franchise record for wins in December with 15 and set an NBA record for consecutive road victories in a calendar month with 10 (including the Christmas Day match-up with the reigning two-time champs, Kobe Bryant's Los Angeles Lakers which the team won 96–80).

During a postgame chat with Sun Sports' Jason Jackson on January 3, 2011, LeBron James joked "I see we sell out 99.1 percent on the road, so we call ourselves the Heatles off the Beatles, so every time we take our show on the road we bring a great crowd", giving the Heat's famed trio the unofficial nickname.

On January 27, 2011, via fan voting, LeBron James (forward) and Dwyane Wade (guard) were selected to be starters for the Eastern Conference at the All-Star Game, becoming the second pair of teammates to be selected as All-Star starters in franchise history (Shaquille O'Neal and Dwyane Wade; 2006 and 2007). A few days later, forward Chris Bosh was selected as a reserve, marking the first time in Heat history the team had sent three players to the All-Star game in a single season.

Like the 2005–06 championship season, the Heat were criticized for being unable to beat the top-caliber teams of the NBA. This criticism though would just grow more and more as the regular season was beginning to wind down. Despite being tied 2–2 with their division rival, the Orlando Magic, sweeping the Los Angeles Lakers 2–0, and beating both the San Antonio Spurs and the Oklahoma City Thunder once, they lost the season series to the defending Eastern Conference champion Boston Celtics 3–1, were swept by the Chicago Bulls 3–0 and lost both times to the Dallas Mavericks, who continued their regular season dominance against Miami for their 16th straight victory dating back to the 2004–05 season.

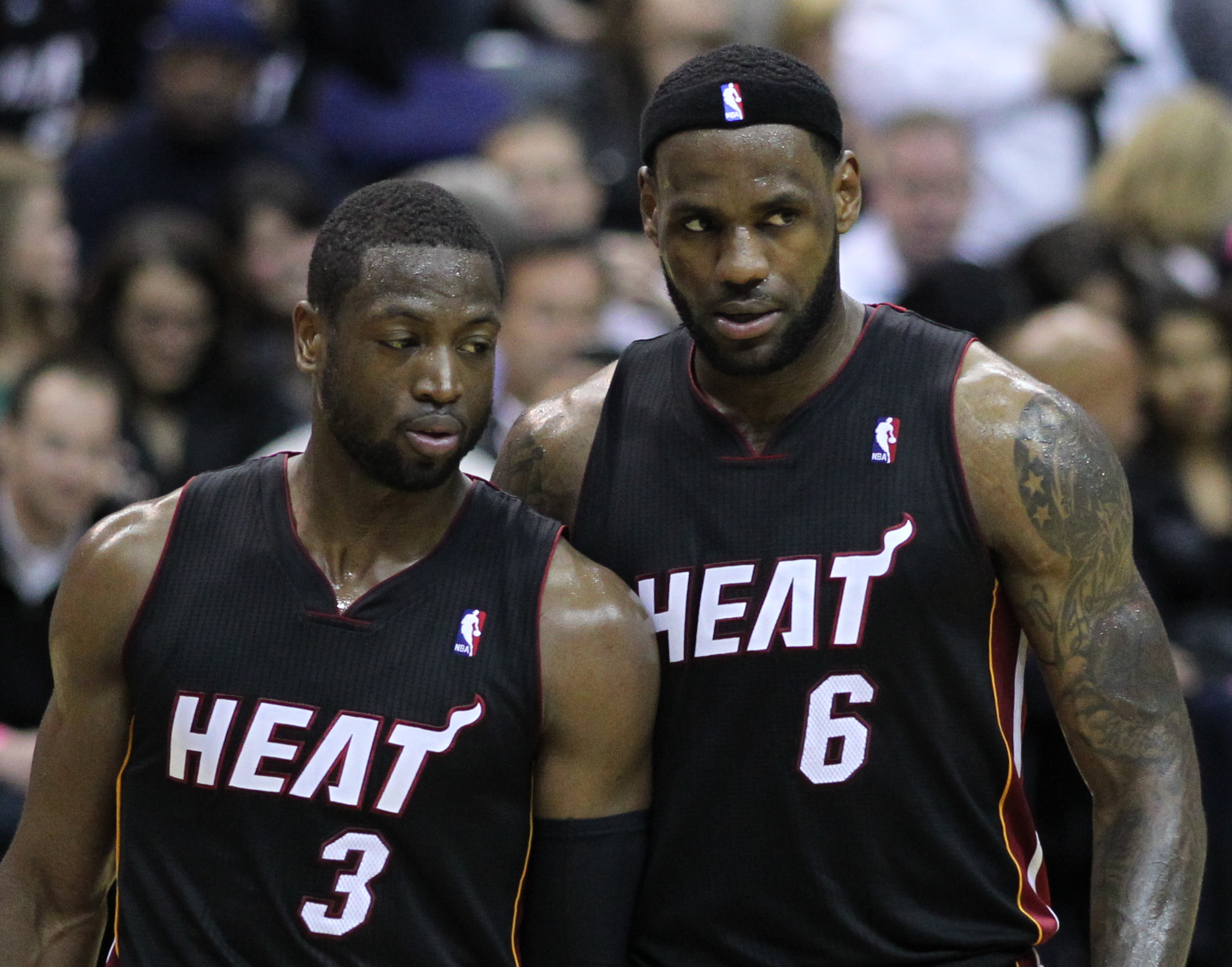
Teammates Dwyane Wade (3) and LeBron James (6) during a game

In order to improve for the playoffs, the Heat signed guard Mike Bibby, who agreed to forfeit the $6.2 million he was owed by the Washington Wizards for the next season so that he could become a free agent and sign a league minimum contract with a contender. In the process, the Heat released Carlos Arroyo. In Bibby's first game on March 3, the Heat were leading the Magic by 24 points in the third quarter before the Heat were outscored 40–9 and lost 99–96. The following night against the Spurs, who held the NBA's best record (51–11), the Heat lost 125–95, their most lopsided loss of the year and their fourth loss in five games. In their next game against the Bulls, the Heat had a 12-point lead in the first half, but ended up losing 87–86 after two failed shots by James and Wade in the last 6 seconds of the game. It was the Heat's 12th and 13th consecutive missed shots with a chance to tie or lead a game in the final 10 seconds of regulation or overtime. James had missed four in the four-game losing streak. It was the Heat's fourth straight loss, and the fourth time since February 24 they had lost after a double-digit lead. The Heat were 2–5 since the All-Star break, 5–13 in games decided by five or fewer points and 14–18 against teams with winning records. After the game, there were reports of players crying in the locker room afterwards. On March 10, the Heat beat the Lakers, 94–88, and ended their five-game losing streak while also ending the Lakers' eight-game winning streak.

On March 27, Wade, James, and Bosh became the second trio in NBA history to have at least 30 points and 10 rebounds in the same non-overtime game (a home win against the Houston Rockets), matching Oscar Robertson, Wayne Embry and Jack Twyman for the Cincinnati Royals in a loss to the Philadelphia Warriors on February 2, 1961. Additionally, it was the first time that a team's trio recorded 20 points and 10 rebounds in consecutive games since Sidney Wicks, Lloyd Neal and John Johnson accomplished the feat with the Portland Trail Blazers in March 1975. It was also the first time in Heat franchise history that three players scored 30 points in the same game.

The 2011 Heat finished with a 58–24 record, third best in team history and a second overall seed, behind the Chicago Bulls, who had the NBA's best record. Additionally, the Heat finished 5th in the NBA in attendance with 810,930 behind Mavericks, Cavaliers, Trail Blazers, and Bulls in that order (100.9% capacity). The Heat faced the Philadelphia 76ers in the first round of the NBA Playoffs and eliminated them in five games. In the Eastern Conference Semi-finals, the Heat defeated their rival Boston Celtics in five games, winning a dramatic overtime Game 4 in Boston and a come-from-behind Game 5 victory at home to finish the series. In the Eastern Conference finals, the Heat faced the Chicago Bulls. After being blown out by 21 points by the Bulls in Game 1, the Heat took home-court by defeating Chicago in Game 2, and winning their home Games 3 and 4, the latter of which came in overtime. In Game 5 in Chicago, the Heat made a historic comeback; after being down 77–65 with 3:14 left, the Heat went on an 18–3 run to win, 83–80, capped by a key four-point play from Dwyane Wade and clutch shooting from LeBron James. The Heat advanced to the 2011 NBA Finals to face the Dallas Mavericks, who had defeated the Portland Trail Blazers, Los Angeles Lakers, and Oklahoma City Thunder. The series was a rematch of the 2006 NBA Finals, in which Dallas won the first two games and then lost four straight to Miami. The Heat won Game 1 in Miami, 92–84, but in Game 2, the Heat were leading the Mavericks by 15 points with 6:20 left in the fourth quarter before the Heat were outscored 22–5 and lost, 95–93. The Heat won Game 3 in Dallas 88–86 with the game-winning basket scored by Chris Bosh. The Mavericks won Game 4, 86–83, holding LeBron James to a career playoff-low 8 points. The Mavericks won Game 5 and took a 3–2 series lead with a 112–103 victory. That was the first time since March 6 that the Heat had lost two consecutive games, including the regular season, playoffs, and the NBA Finals. In Game 6, Dallas defeated Miami, 105–95, to win the 2011 NBA Finals in six games, 4–2. James's 17.8 points per game in the Finals was the largest drop off in points from a regular season to an NBA Finals (down 8.9 points from 26.7) in NBA history. As James only averaged three points in the fourth quarters in the series, and he received the brunt of the criticism for the team's loss to Dallas as a result of his lackluster performance.

== Draft picks ==
Round	Pick	Player	Position	Nationality	College/Team
2	32	Dexter Pittman	C	USA	Texas (Sr.)
2	41	Jarvis Varnado	PF	USA	Mississippi State (Sr.)
2	42	Da'Sean Butler	SF	USA	West Virginia (Sr.)
2	48	Latavious Williams (traded to Oklahoma City)	SF/PF	USA	Tulsa 66ers (D-League)

== Roster ==
2010–11 Miami Heat roster
Players

Pos.	No.	Player	Height	Weight	DOB	From
C	50	Joel Anthony	6 ft 9 in (2.06 m)	245 lb (111 kg)	1982-08-09	UNLV
PG	0	Mike Bibby	6 ft 2 in (1.88 m)	195 lb (88 kg)	1978-05-13	Arizona
PF	1	Chris Bosh	6 ft 11 in (2.11 m)	235 lb (107 kg)	1984-03-24	Georgia Tech
PG	15	Mario Chalmers	6 ft 2 in (1.88 m)	195 lb (88 kg)	1986-05-19	Kansas
C	25	Erick Dampier	6 ft 11 in (2.11 m)	265 lb (120 kg)	1975-07-14	Mississippi State
PF	40	Udonis Haslem	6 ft 8 in (2.03 m)	235 lb (107 kg)	1980-06-09	Florida
SG	55	Eddie House	6 ft 1 in (1.85 m)	178 lb (81 kg)	1978-05-14	Arizona State
PF	5	Juwan Howard	6 ft 9 in (2.06 m)	253 lb (115 kg)	1973-02-07	Michigan
C	11	Zydrunas Ilgauskas	7 ft 3 in (2.21 m)	260 lb (118 kg)	1975-06-05	Lithuania
SF	6	LeBron James	6 ft 8 in (2.03 m)	250 lb (113 kg)	1984-12-30	St. Vincent–St. Mary HS
SF	22	James Jones	6 ft 8 in (2.03 m)	215 lb (98 kg)	1980-10-04	Miami (FL)
C	21	Jamaal Magloire	7 ft 0 in (2.13 m)	255 lb (116 kg)	1978-05-21	Kentucky
SG	13	Mike Miller	6 ft 8 in (2.03 m)	218 lb (99 kg)	1980-02-19	Florida
C	45	Dexter Pittman	6 ft 10 in (2.08 m)	290 lb (132 kg)	1988-03-02	Texas
SG	3	Dwyane Wade	6 ft 4 in (1.93 m)	220 lb (100 kg)	1982-01-17	Marquette

Coaches
Head coach
- Erik Spoelstra
Assistant(s)
- Keith Askins
- David Fizdale
- Bill Foran
- Chet Kammerer
- Bob McAdoo
- Ron Rothstein

Legend
- (DP) Unsigned draft pick
- (FA) Free agent
- (S) Suspended
- Injured

Roster
Updated: March 2, 2011

=== 2010–11 Salaries ===
Player	2010–11 Salary
LeBron James	$14,500,001
Chris Bosh	$14,500,000
Dwyane Wade	$14,000,000
Mike Miller	$5,000,000
Udonis Haslem	$3,500,000
Joel Anthony	$3,000,000
Zydrunas Ilgauskas	$1,352,181
Jamaal Magloire	$1,352,181
Juwan Howard	$1,352,181
Eddie House	$1,352,181
James Jones	$1,146,337
Erick Dampier	$1,137,423
Mario Chalmers	$854,839
Dexter Pittman	$473,604
Mike Bibby	$323,021
TOTAL	$67,950,231

- As of March 2011.
- Source: Hoops World.com

== Pre-season ==
=== Game log ===
2010 pre-season game log
Pre-season: 3–4 (home: 3–1; road: 0–3)

Game	Date	Team	Score	High points	High rebounds	High assists	Location Attendance	Record
1	October 5	Detroit	W 105–89	Chris Bosh (20)	Udonis Haslem (13)	Mario Chalmers (7)	American Airlines Arena; 19,600	1–0
2	October 8	Oklahoma City	W 103–96	Chris Bosh (23)	Udonis Haslem (9)	LeBron James (8)	Sprint Center; 18,222	2–0
3	October 9	@ San Antonio	L 73–90	James Jones, LeBron James (12)	Patrick Beverley (10)	Patrick Beverley (5)	AT&T Center; 18,581	2–1
4	October 12	CSKA Moscow	W 96–85	LeBron James (22)	Chris Bosh (8)	LeBron James (7)	American Airlines Arena; 17,503	3–1
5	October 13	@ New Orleans	L 76–90	Chris Bosh (24)	Udonis Haslem (11)	Kenny Hasbrouck (7)	New Orleans Arena; 12,043	3–2
6	October 18	Charlotte	L 96–102	LeBron James (33)	Chris Bosh, Udonis Haslem (8)	LeBron James (5)	American Airlines Arena; 18,557	3–3
7	October 21	@ Atlanta	L 89–98	LeBron James (38)	Chris Bosh (14)	Mario Chalmers, Eddie House (3)	Philips Arena; 15,197	3–4
8	October 22	Orlando	Cancelled				St. Pete Times Forum	–

2010–11 season schedule

== Regular season ==
=== Standings ===
Southeast Division	W	L	PCT	GB	Home	Road	Div
y-Miami Heat	58	24	.707	–	30–11	28–13	13–3
x-Orlando Magic	52	30	.634	6	29–12	23–18	11–5
x-Atlanta Hawks	44	38	.537	14	24–17	20–21	9–7
Charlotte Bobcats	34	48	.415	24	21–20	13–28	4–12
Washington Wizards	23	59	.280	35	20–21	3–38	3–13

#	Eastern Conference				
#	Team	W	L	PCT	GB
1	z-Chicago Bulls	62	20	.756	–
2	y-Miami Heat	58	24	.707	4
3	y-Boston Celtics	56	26	.683	6
4	x-Orlando Magic	52	30	.634	10
5	x-Atlanta Hawks	44	38	.537	18
6	x-New York Knicks	42	40	.512	20
7	x-Philadelphia 76ers	41	41	.500	21
8	x-Indiana Pacers	37	45	.451	25
9	Milwaukee Bucks	35	47	.427	27
10	Charlotte Bobcats	34	48	.415	28
11	Detroit Pistons	30	52	.366	32
12	New Jersey Nets	24	58	.293	38
13	Washington Wizards	23	59	.280	39
14	Toronto Raptors	22	60	.268	40
15	Cleveland Cavaliers	19	63	.232	43

=== Game log ===
2010–11 game log
Total: 58–24 (home: 30–11; road: 28–13)
October: 3–1 (home: 1–0; road: 2–1)

Game	Date	Team	Score	High points	High rebounds	High assists	Location Attendance	Record
1	October 26	@ Boston	L 80–88	LeBron James (31)	Udonis Haslem (11)	Dwyane Wade (6)	TD Garden; 18,624	0–1
2	October 27	@ Philadelphia	W 97–87	Dwyane Wade (30)	Dwyane Wade, Chris Bosh (7)	LeBron James (7)	Wells Fargo Center; 20,389	1–1
3	October 29	Orlando	W 96–70	Dwyane Wade (26)	Udonis Haslem (11)	LeBron James (7)	American Airlines Arena; 19,600	2–1
4	October 31	@ New Jersey	W 101–78	LeBron James (20)	LeBron James, Udonis Haslem (7)	LeBron James, Dwyane Wade (7)	Prudential Center; 17,086	3–1

November: 7–7 (home: 7–3; road: 0–4)

Game	Date	Team	Score	High points	High rebounds	High assists	Location Attendance	Record
5	November 2	Minnesota	W 129–97	Dwyane Wade (26)	Udonis Haslem (9)	LeBron James (12)	American Airlines Arena; 19,600	4–1
6	November 5	@ New Orleans	L 93–96	Dwyane Wade (28)	Dwyane Wade (10)	LeBron James (10)	New Orleans Arena; 17,988	4–2
7	November 6	New Jersey	W 101–89	Dwyane Wade (29)	Dwyane Wade (10)	LeBron James (9)	American Airlines Arena; 19,600	5–2
8	November 9	Utah	L 114–116 (OT)	Dwyane Wade (39)	LeBron James (11)	LeBron James (14)	American Airlines Arena; 19,600	5–3
9	November 11	Boston	L 107–112	LeBron James (35)	LeBron James, Udonis Haslem (10)	LeBron James (9)	American Airlines Arena; 19,650	5–4
10	November 13	Toronto	W 109–100	Dwyane Wade (31)	Udonis Haslem (10)	LeBron James (11)	American Airlines Arena; 19,600	6–4
11	November 17	Phoenix	W 123–96	Chris Bosh (35)	Udonis Haslem (10)	LeBron James (9)	American Airlines Arena; 19,600	7–4
12	November 19	Charlotte	W 95–87	LeBron James (32)	Chris Bosh (14)	LeBron James (5)	American Airlines Arena; 19,600	8–4
13	November 20	@ Memphis	L 95–97	LeBron James (29)	Chris Bosh, Žydrūnas Ilgauskas (10)	LeBron James (11)	FedExForum; 18,119	8–5
14	November 22	Indiana	L 77–93	LeBron James (25)	Chris Bosh (11)	LeBron James (6)	American Airlines Arena; 19,600	8–6
15	November 24	@ Orlando	L 95–104	LeBron James (25)	Dwyane Wade (7)	Carlos Arroyo, Dwyane Wade (5)	Amway Center; 18,936	8–7
16	November 26	Philadelphia	W 99–90	Dwyane Wade (23)	Chris Bosh (9)	Dwyane Wade (8)	American Airlines Arena; 19,800	9–7
17	November 27	@ Dallas	L 95–106	LeBron James (23)	Dwyane Wade (9)	Dwyane Wade (5)	American Airlines Center; 20,536	9–8
18	November 29	Washington	W 105–94	LeBron James (30)	Dwyane Wade (8)	Dwyane Wade (6)	American Airlines Arena; 19,600	10–8

December: 15–1 (home: 5–1; road: 10–0)

Game	Date	Team	Score	High points	High rebounds	High assists	Location Attendance	Record
19	December 1	Detroit	W 97–72	LeBron James (18)	Chris Bosh, James Jones (7)	Mario Chalmers (6)	American Airlines Arena; 19,600	11–8
20	December 2	@ Cleveland	W 118–90	LeBron James (38)	Dwyane Wade (9)	Dwyane Wade (9)	Quicken Loans Arena; 20,562	12–8
21	December 4	Atlanta	W 89–77	Chris Bosh (27)	Chris Bosh, Dwyane Wade (10)	Mario Chalmers, LeBron James (4)	American Airlines Arena; 19,600	13–8
22	December 6	@ Milwaukee	W 88–78	Dwyane Wade (25)	Dwyane Wade (14)	LeBron James (6)	Bradley Center; 17,167	14–8
23	December 8	@ Utah	W 111–98	LeBron James (33)	Žydrūnas Ilgauskas (10)	LeBron James (9)	EnergySolutions Arena; 19,911	15–8
24	December 10	@ Golden State	W 106–84	Dwyane Wade (34)	Dwyane Wade (9)	LeBron James (9)	Oracle Arena; 20,036	16–8
25	December 11	@ Sacramento	W 104–83	Dwyane Wade (36)	Chris Bosh (17)	Dwyane Wade (6)	ARCO Arena; 16,396	17–8
26	December 13	New Orleans	W 96–84	Dwyane Wade (32)	Chris Bosh (11)	LeBron James (7)	American Airlines Arena; 19,600	18–8
27	December 15	Cleveland	W 101–95	Dwyane Wade (28)	LeBron James (13)	LeBron James (5)	American Airlines Arena; 19,899	19–8
28	December 17	@ New York	W 113–91	LeBron James (32)	LeBron James (11)	LeBron James (10)	Madison Square Garden; 19,763	20–8
29	December 18	@ Washington	W 95–94	LeBron James (32)	Chris Bosh (9)	LeBron James (6)	Verizon Center; 20,278	21–8
30	December 20	Dallas	L 96–98	Dwyane Wade (22)	LeBron James (10)	LeBron James, Dwyane Wade (7)	American Airlines Arena; 20,178	21–9
31	December 23	@ Phoenix	W 95–83	LeBron James (36)	Chris Bosh (11)	LeBron James (4)	US Airways Center; 18,422	22–9
32	December 25	@ L.A. Lakers	W 96–80	LeBron James (27)	Chris Bosh (13)	LeBron James (10)	Staples Center; 18,997	23–9
33	December 28	New York	W 106–98	Dwyane Wade (40)	Chris Bosh, Žydrūnas Ilgauskas, LeBron James (10)	LeBron James (8)	American Airlines Arena; 20,288	24–9
34	December 29	@ Houston	W 125–119	Dwyane Wade (45)	Joel Anthony, Dwyane Wade (7)	LeBron James (9)	Toyota Center; 18,409	25–9

January: 9–5 (home: 5–1; road: 4–4)

Game	Date	Team	Score	High points	High rebounds	High assists	Location Attendance	Record
35	January 1	Golden State	W 114–107	LeBron James, Dwyane Wade (25)	Chris Bosh (11)	LeBron James (10)	American Airlines Arena; 20,254	26–9
36	January 3	@ Charlotte	W 96–82	LeBron James (38)	Joel Anthony, Dwyane Wade (11)	LeBron James (5)	Time Warner Cable Arena; 19,233	27–9
37	January 4	Milwaukee	W 101–89	Dwyane Wade (34)	Chris Bosh (12)	LeBron James (9)	American Airlines Arena; 20,215	28–9
38	January 7	@ Milwaukee	W 101–95 (OT)	LeBron James (26)	Chris Bosh (12)	LeBron James (5)	Bradley Center; 18,717	29–9
39	January 9	@ Portland	W 107–100 (OT)	LeBron James (44)	LeBron James (13)	LeBron James (6)	Rose Garden; 20,636	30–9
40	January 12	@ L.A. Clippers	L 105–111	Dwyane Wade (31)	Chris Bosh (13)	LeBron James (6)	Staples Center; 19,803	30–10
41	January 13	@ Denver	L 102–130	Chris Bosh (24)	Mike Miller (8)	Mike Miller (8)	Pepsi Center; 19,155	30–11
42	January 15	@ Chicago	L 96–99	Dwyane Wade (33)	Dwyane Wade (6)	Dwyane Wade (4)	United Center; 23,017	30–12
43	January 18	Atlanta	L 89–93 (OT)	LeBron James (34)	Joel Anthony (16)	LeBron James (7)	American Airlines Arena; 19,600	30–13
44	January 22	Toronto	W 120–103	LeBron James (38)	LeBron James (11)	Mario Chalmers (9)	American Airlines Arena; 20,025	31–13
45	January 27	@ New York	L 88–93	Dwyane Wade (34)	Dwyane Wade (16)	LeBron James, Dwyane Wade (5)	Madison Square Garden; 19,763	31–14
46	January 28	Detroit	W 88–87	LeBron James (39)	Mike Miller (10)	LeBron James (9)	American Airlines Arena; 19,805	32–14
47	January 30	@ Oklahoma City	W 108–103	Dwyane Wade (32)	Dwyane Wade (9)	LeBron James (13)	Oklahoma City Arena; 18,203	33–14
48	January 31	Cleveland	W 117–90	Dwyane Wade (34)	Žydrūnas Ilgauskas (14)	LeBron James (8)	American Airlines Arena; 19,600	34–14

February: 9–3 (home: 4–1; road: 5–2)

Game	Date	Team	Score	High points	High rebounds	High assists	Location Attendance	Record
49	February 3	@ Orlando	W 104–100	LeBron James (51)	LeBron James, Mike Miller (11)	LeBron James (8)	Amway Center; 18,945	35–14
50	February 4	@ Charlotte	W 109–97	Dwyane Wade (22)	Dwyane Wade (12)	Dwyane Wade (10)	Time Warner Cable Arena; 19,592	36–14
51	February 6	L.A. Clippers	W 97–79	Dwyane Wade (28)	Dwyane Wade (8)	Dwyane Wade (8)	American Airlines Arena; 19,702	37–14
52	February 8	Indiana	W 117–112	LeBron James (41)	LeBron James (13)	LeBron James (8)	American Airlines Arena; 19,600	38–14
53	February 11	@ Detroit	W 106–92	Dwyane Wade (24)	Chris Bosh (10)	LeBron James (10)	The Palace of Auburn Hills; 22,076	39–14
54	February 13	@ Boston	L 82–85	Chris Bosh (24)	Chris Bosh (10)	LeBron James (7)	TD Garden; 18,624	39–15
55	February 15	@ Indiana	W 110–103	Dwyane Wade (41)	Dwyane Wade (12)	LeBron James (5)	Conseco Fieldhouse; 18,165	40–15
56	February 16	@ Toronto	W 103–95	Dwyane Wade (28)	LeBron James (13)	LeBron James (8)	Air Canada Centre; 20,156	41–15
All-Star Break
57	February 22	Sacramento	W 117–97	LeBron James (31)	Chris Bosh (9)	Dwyane Wade (7)	American Airlines Arena; 19,754	42–15
58	February 24	@ Chicago	L 89–93	Dwyane Wade (34)	LeBron James (10)	LeBron James (5)	United Center; 23,024	42–16
59	February 25	Washington	W 121–113	Dwyane Wade (41)	LeBron James (9)	LeBron James (7)	American Airlines Arena; 19,825	43–16
60	February 27	New York	L 86–91	LeBron James (27)	Chris Bosh (12)	Dwyane Wade (9)	American Airlines Arena; 19,702	43–17

March: 9–6 (home: 6–4; road: 3–2)

Game	Date	Team	Score	High points	High rebounds	High assists	Location Attendance	Record
61	March 3	Orlando	L 96–99	LeBron James (29)	LeBron James, Mike Miller (6)	Dwyane Wade (5)	American Airlines Arena; 19,600	43–18
62	March 4	@ San Antonio	L 95–125	LeBron James (26)	Chris Bosh (14)	LeBron James (7)	AT&T Center; 18,581	43–19
63	March 6	Chicago	L 86–87	LeBron James (26)	LeBron James (8)	LeBron James (6)	American Airlines Arena; 19,763	43–20
64	March 8	Portland	L 96–105	Dwyane Wade (38)	LeBron James (11)	LeBron James (8)	American Airlines Arena; 19,835	43–21
65	March 10	L.A. Lakers	W 94–88	Chris Bosh (24)	Chris Bosh (9)	LeBron James (9)	American Airlines Arena; 19,986	44–21
66	March 12	Memphis	W 118–85	Dwyane Wade (28)	Chris Bosh (10)	Dwyane Wade (9)	American Airlines Arena; 19,600	45–21
67	March 14	San Antonio	W 110–80	Chris Bosh (30)	Chris Bosh (12)	LeBron James (8)	American Airlines Arena; 20,021	46–21
68	March 16	Oklahoma City	L 85–96	Chris Bosh, Dwyane Wade (21)	Chris Bosh (11)	Mario Chalmers, LeBron James (3)	American Airlines Arena; 20,083	46–22
69	March 18	@ Atlanta	W 106–85	LeBron James (43)	Chris Bosh (10)	Mike Bibby (6)	Philips Arena; 20,024	47–22
70	March 19	Denver	W 103–98	LeBron James (33)	Chris Bosh (11)	Chris Bosh (6)	American Airlines Arena; 19,600	48–22
71	March 23	@ Detroit	W 100–94	Dwyane Wade (24)	LeBron James (8)	LeBron James (7)	The Palace of Auburn Hills; 22,076	49–22
72	March 25	Philadelphia	W 111–99	Dwyane Wade (39)	Dwyane Wade (11)	Dwyane Wade (8)	American Airlines Arena; 19,840	50–22
73	March 27	Houston	W 125–119	LeBron James (33)	Chris Bosh (12)	LeBron James (7)	American Airlines Arena; 19,825	51–22
74	March 29	@ Cleveland	L 90–102	LeBron James (27)	LeBron James (10)	LeBron James (12)	Quicken Loans Arena; 20,562	51–23
75	March 30	@ Washington	W 123–107	LeBron James (35)	Chris Bosh, LeBron James (8)	Dwyane Wade (9)	Verizon Center; 18,916	52–23

April: 6–1 (home: 2–1; road: 4–0)

Game	Date	Team	Score	High points	High rebounds	High assists	Location Attendance	Record
76	April 1	@ Minnesota	W 111–92	Dwyane Wade (32)	Chris Bosh (11)	LeBron James (10)	Target Center; 19,096	53–23
77	April 3	@ New Jersey	W 108–94	LeBron James (31)	Erick Dampier (14)	LeBron James (7)	Prudential Center; 18,711	54–23
78	April 6	Milwaukee	L 85–90	LeBron James (29)	Mike Miller (12)	LeBron James (8)	American Airlines Arena; 20,017	54–24
79	April 8	Charlotte	W 112–103	Chris Bosh, Dwyane Wade (27)	Chris Bosh (10)	LeBron James (9)	American Airlines Arena; 19,897	55–24
80	April 10	Boston	W 100–77	LeBron James (27)	Joel Anthony (10)	Dwyane Wade (8)	American Airlines Arena; 19,766	56–24
81	April 11	@ Atlanta	W 98–90	LeBron James (34)	LeBron James (10)	LeBron James (7)	Philips Arena; 18,529	57–24
82	April 13	@ Toronto	W 97–79	Eddie House (35)	Jamaal Magloire (19)	Mario Chalmers (13)	Air Canada Centre; 20,108	58–24

2010–11 season schedule

== Playoffs ==
=== Game log ===
2011 playoff game log
First Round: 4–1 (home: 3–0; road: 1–1)

Game	Date	Team	Score	High points	High rebounds	High assists	Location Attendance	Series
1	April 16	Philadelphia	W 97–89	Chris Bosh (25)	LeBron James (14)	LeBron James, Dwyane Wade (5)	American Airlines Arena; 19,600	1–0
2	April 18	Philadelphia	W 94–73	LeBron James (29)	Chris Bosh (11)	LeBron James (6)	American Airlines Arena; 20,204	2–0
3	April 21	@ Philadelphia	W 100–94	Dwyane Wade (32)	LeBron James (15)	Dwyane Wade (8)	Wells Fargo Center; 20,404	3–0
4	April 24	@ Philadelphia	L 82–86	LeBron James (31)	Dwyane Wade (8)	LeBron James (6)	Wells Fargo Center; 19,048	3–1
5	April 27	Philadelphia	W 97–91	Dwyane Wade (26)	Chris Bosh, Dwyane Wade (11)	LeBron James (8)	American Airlines Arena; 19,896	4–1

Conference Semifinals: 4–1 (home: 3–0; road: 1–1)

Game	Date	Team	Score	High points	High rebounds	High assists	Location Attendance	Series
1	May 1	Boston	W 99–90	Dwyane Wade (38)	Chris Bosh (12)	LeBron James, Dwyane Wade (5)	American Airlines Arena; 20,021	1–0
2	May 3	Boston	W 102–91	LeBron James (35)	Chris Bosh (11)	Chris Bosh (4)	American Airlines Arena; 20,104	2–0
3	May 7	@ Boston	L 81–97	Dwyane Wade (23)	Joel Anthony (11)	Dwyane Wade (7)	TD Garden; 18,624	2–1
4	May 9	@ Boston	W 98–90 (OT)	LeBron James (35)	LeBron James (14)	Dwyane Wade (4)	TD Garden; 18,624	3–1
5	May 11	Boston	W 97–87	Dwyane Wade (34)	Chris Bosh (11)	Dwyane Wade (5)	American Airlines Arena; 20,208	4–1

Conference Finals: 4–1 (home: 2–0; road: 2–1)

Game	Date	Team	Score	High points	High rebounds	High assists	Location Attendance	Series
1	May 15	@ Chicago	L 82–103	Chris Bosh (30)	Chris Bosh (9)	LeBron James (6)	United Center; 22,874	0–1
2	May 18	@ Chicago	W 85–75	LeBron James (29)	LeBron James (10)	LeBron James (5)	United Center; 23,007	1–1
3	May 22	Chicago	W 96–85	Chris Bosh (34)	Dwyane Wade (9)	LeBron James (10)	American Airlines Arena; 20,123	2–1
4	May 24	Chicago	W 101–93 (OT)	LeBron James (35)	Udonis Haslem, Mike Miller (9)	LeBron James (6)	American Airlines Arena; 20,125	3–1
5	May 26	@ Chicago	W 83–80	LeBron James (28)	LeBron James (11)	LeBron James (6)	United Center; 23,057	4–1

NBA Finals: 2–4 (home: 1–2; road: 1–2)

Game	Date	Team	Score	High points	High rebounds	High assists	Location Attendance	Series
1	May 31	Dallas	W 92–84	LeBron James (24)	Dwyane Wade (10)	Dwyane Wade (6)	American Airlines Arena; 20,003	1–0
2	June 2	Dallas	L 93–95	Dwyane Wade (36)	Chris Bosh, LeBron James (8)	Dwyane Wade (6)	American Airlines Arena; 20,003	1–1
3	June 5	@ Dallas	W 88–86	Dwyane Wade (29)	Dwyane Wade (11)	LeBron James (9)	American Airlines Center; 20,340	2–1
4	June 7	@ Dallas	L 83–86	Dwyane Wade (32)	LeBron James (9)	LeBron James (7)	American Airlines Center; 20,430	2–2
5	June 9	@ Dallas	L 103–112	Dwyane Wade (23)	Chris Bosh, LeBron James (10)	LeBron James (10)	American Airlines Center; 20,433	2–3
6	June 12	Dallas	L 95–105	LeBron James (21)	Udonis Haslem (9)	Mario Chalmers (7)	American Airlines Arena; 20,003	2–4

2011 playoff schedule

== Player statistics ==
=== Regular season ===
Player	POS	GP	GS	MP	REB	AST	STL	BLK	PTS	MPG	RPG	APG	SPG	BPG	PPG
James Jones	SF	81	8	1,549	160	43	29	19	475	19.1	2.0	.5	.4	.2	5.9
LeBron James	SF	79	79	3,063	590	554	124	50	2,111	38.8	7.5	7.0	1.6	.6	26.7
Chris Bosh	PF	77	77	2,795	641	144	59	49	1,438	36.3	8.3	1.9	.8	.6	18.7
Dwyane Wade	SG	76	76	2,823	485	346	111	87	1,941	37.1	6.4	4.6	1.5	1.1	25.5
Joel Anthony	C	75	11	1,463	266	24	10	93	153	19.5	3.5	.3	.1	1.2	2.0
Zydrunas Ilgauskas	C	72	51	1,145	287	26	23	58	360	15.9	4.0	.4	.3	.8	5.0
Mario Chalmers	PG	70	28	1,579	146	177	76	7	447	22.6	2.1	2.5	1.1	.1	6.4
Juwan Howard	PF	57	0	592	122	23	10	4	139	10.4	2.1	.4	.2	.1	2.4
Eddie House	SG	56	1	978	92	62	32	3	362	17.5	1.6	1.1	.6	.1	6.5
Erick Dampier	C	51	22	815	177	22	14	47	128	16.0	3.5	.4	.3	.9	2.5
Carlos Arroyo^{†}	PG	49	42	995	80	100	14	1	274	20.3	1.6	2.0	.3	.0	5.6
Mike Miller	SG	41	2	838	184	51	20	2	228	20.4	4.5	1.2	.5	.0	5.6
Mike Bibby^{†}	PG	22	12	582	49	55	11	3	160	26.5	2.2	2.5	.5	.1	7.3
Jamaal Magloire	C	18	0	158	61	3	4	2	35	8.8	3.4	.2	.2	.1	1.9
Udonis Haslem	PF	13	0	345	106	6	7	3	104	26.5	8.2	.5	.5	.2	8.0
Jerry Stackhouse	SG	7	1	50	7	3	0	2	12	7.1	1.0	.4	.0	.3	1.7
Dexter Pittman	C	2	0	11	3	0	0	0	2	5.5	1.5	.0	.0	.0	1.0

- ^{†} Denotes player spent time with another team in the season. Stats reflect time with the Heat only.

=== Playoffs ===
Player	POS	GP	GS	MP	REB	AST	STL	BLK	PTS	MPG	RPG	APG	SPG	BPG	PPG
LeBron James	SF	21	21	922	176	123	35	25	497	43.9	8.4	5.9	1.7	1.2	23.7
Chris Bosh	PF	21	21	834	178	23	14	19	390	39.7	8.5	1.1	.7	.9	18.6
Dwyane Wade	SG	21	21	828	150	92	34	28	515	39.4	7.1	4.4	1.6	1.3	24.5
Joel Anthony	C	21	13	575	97	10	8	38	58	27.4	4.6	.5	.4	1.8	2.8
Mario Chalmers	PG	21	1	511	40	44	27	1	163	24.3	1.9	2.1	1.3	.0	7.8
Mike Bibby	PG	20	20	415	36	23	11	6	73	20.8	1.8	1.2	.6	.3	3.7
Mike Miller	SG	18	0	215	49	13	7	1	47	11.9	2.7	.7	.4	.1	2.6
Udonis Haslem	PF	12	0	290	54	9	6	4	63	24.2	4.5	.8	.5	.3	5.3
James Jones	SF	12	0	272	30	2	6	2	78	22.7	2.5	.2	.5	.2	6.5
Juwan Howard	PF	11	0	60	10	1	0	0	17	5.5	.9	.1	.0	.0	1.5
Zydrunas Ilgauskas	C	9	8	104	32	3	0	3	32	11.6	3.6	.3	.0	.3	3.6
Eddie House	SG	7	0	48	5	1	4	0	11	6.9	.7	.1	.6	.0	1.6
Jamaal Magloire	C	3	0	18	5	2	1	0	4	6.0	1.7	.7	.3	.0	1.3

== Awards, records and milestones ==
=== Awards ===
==== Week/Month ====
- On December 13, 2010 Dwyane Wade was named Eastern Conference's Player of the Week (December 6 – 12).
- On December 27, 2010 LeBron James was named Eastern Conference's Player of the Week (December 20 – 26).
- On January 3, 2011 Dwyane Wade was named Eastern Conference's Player of the Week (December 27 – January 2).
- On January 3, 2011 LeBron James and Dwyane Wade were named Eastern Conference's Co-Players of the Month (December).
- On January 3, 2011 Erik Spoelstra was named Eastern Conference's Coach of the Month (December).
- On January 10, 2011 LeBron James was named Eastern Conference's Player of the Week (January 3 – 9).
- On January 31, 2011 LeBron James was named Eastern Conference's Player of the Week (January 24 – 30).
- On February 4, 2011 LeBron James was named Eastern Conference's Player of the Month (January).
- On February 7, 2011 LeBron James was named Eastern Conference's Player of the Week (January 31 – February 6).
- On March 14, 2011 Dwyane Wade was named Eastern Conference's Player of the Week (March 7 – 13).
- On March 21, 2011 LeBron James was named Eastern Conference's Player of the Week (March 14 – 20).
- On April 15, 2011 LeBron James was named Eastern Conference's Player of the Month (April).

==== All-Star ====
- LeBron James was voted to his 7th consecutive NBA All-Star Game as a starter (7th consecutive time as a starter).
- Dwyane Wade was voted to his 7th consecutive NBA All-Star Game as a starter (6th consecutive time as a starter).
- Chris Bosh was selected to his 6th consecutive NBA All-Star Game (4th consecutive time as a reserve).
- James Jones won the 2011 NBA All-Star Three-point Shootout.

==== Season ====
- On May 9, 2011 LeBron James was named to the NBA All-Defensive First Team.
- On May 10, 2011 Pat Riley was named NBA Co-Executive of the Year.
- On May 12, 2011 LeBron James was named to the All-NBA First Team.
- On May 12, 2011 Dwyane Wade was named to the All-NBA Second Team.

=== Records ===
- On December 23, 2010 LeBron James became the youngest player to have reached 16,000 career points.
- On March 18, 2011 LeBron James became the youngest player to have reached 17,000 career points.
- On March 27, 2011 Chris Bosh, LeBron James and Dwyane Wade became the first trio in franchise history to each score 30 or more points and 10 or more rebounds in a single game, against the Houston Rockets.

=== Milestones ===
- On December 18, 2010 Chris Bosh reached 5,000th career rebounds.
- On December 18, 2010 Juwan Howard reached his 16,000th career points.
- On December 23, 2010 LeBron James became the youngest player to have reached 16,000 career points.
- On January 7, 2011 LeBron James reached 500th career blocks.
- On January 13, 2011 Dwyane Wade reached 500th career blocks.
- On March 18, 2011 LeBron James became the youngest player to have reached 17,000 career points.
- On March 27, 2011 Chris Bosh, LeBron James and Dwyane Wade became only the second trio in NBA history to each score 30 or more points and 10 or more rebounds in a single non-overtime game, against the Houston Rockets.

== Transactions ==
=== Trades ===
June 23, 2010
To Oklahoma City Thunder----
- (United States) Daequan Cook
  No. 18 Pick (Eric Bledsoe)
To Miami Heat----
- No. 32nd Pick (Dexter Pittman)
June 24, 2010
To Oklahoma City Thunder----
- No. 48 Pick (Latavious Williams)
To Miami Heat----
- Future Second-Round Pick
  Cash Considerations
July 9, 2010
To Cleveland Cavaliers----
- 2013 First-Round Pick
  2015 First-Round Pick
  2012 Second-Round Pick (Jae Crowder)
  Future Second-Round Pick
  Trade Exception
To Miami Heat----
- (United States) LeBron James (sign and trade)
July 9, 2010
To Toronto Raptors----
- Two 2011 First-Round Picks
  Trade Exception
To Miami Heat----
- (United States) Chris Bosh (sign and trade)
July 12, 2010
To Minnesota Timberwolves----
- (United States) Michael Beasley
To Miami Heat----
- 2011 Second-Round Pick
  2014 Second-Round Pick
  Cash Considerations

=== Additions ===
Player	Signed	Former Team
Dwyane Wade	Signed 6 Year Contract For $107.5 Million	Miami Heat
Chris Bosh	Signed 6 Year Contract For $110.1 Million	Toronto Raptors
LeBron James	Signed 6 Year Contract For $110.1 Million	Cleveland Cavaliers
Udonis Haslem	Signed 5 Year Contract For $20.0 Million	Miami Heat
Mike Miller	Signed 5 Year Contract For $25.0 Million	Washington Wizards
Joel Anthony	Signed 5 Year Contract For $18.0 Million	Miami Heat
Žydrūnas Ilgauskas	Signed 2 Year Contract For $2.8 Million	Cleveland Cavaliers
Juwan Howard	Signed 1 Year Contract For $1.35 Million	Portland Trail Blazers
James Jones	Signed 1 Year Contract For $1.1 Million	Miami Heat
Carlos Arroyo	Signed 1 Year Contract For $1.23 Million	Miami Heat
Jamaal Magloire	Signed 1 Year Contract For 1.23 Million	Miami Heat
Shavlik Randolph	Signed 1 Year Contract For $250,000	Miami Heat
Jerry Stackhouse	Signed 1 Year Contract For $210,339	Milwaukee Bucks
Erick Dampier	Signed 1 Year Contract For $1.14 Million	Charlotte Bobcats
Mike Bibby	Signed 1 Year Contract For $450,727	Washington Wizards

==== Subtractions ====
Player	Reason Left	New Team
Dorell Wright	Free Agent	Golden State Warriors
Quentin Richardson	Free Agent	Orlando Magic
Jermaine O'Neal	Free Agent	Boston Celtics
Shavlik Randolph	Waived	
Jerry Stackhouse	Waived	
Carlos Arroyo	Waived	Boston Celtics

== Season in review ==
The Miami Heat entered NBA free agency in 2010 with nearly $46 million in salary cap space, with the ability to re-sign free agent Dwyane Wade, and add two of the NBA's top players, LeBron James and Chris Bosh. According to Fox Sports Radio's Stephen A. Smith, speaking on his show just days after the NBA draft, the Heat were "highly likely" to sign all three players. The New Jersey Nets, New York Knicks, Los Angeles Clippers, Chicago Bulls, Cleveland Cavaliers, Dallas Mavericks and Miami Heat were in negotiations to sign LeBron James. On July 7, 2010, Dwyane Wade and Chris Bosh agreed to terms with the Miami Heat. Then on July 8, 2010, James held an hour-long special to announce his decision on ESPN to commit to playing with the Heat. Later that evening, the Heat announced the trade of Michael Beasley to the Minnesota Timberwolves for a pair of second-round picks and cash considerations.

On July 8, 2010, it became official that NBA players and gold medal-winning Beijing Olympic teammates James, Wade, and Bosh would be joining the Heat. The Heat completed sign-and-trade deals, sending a total of four future first-round and two-second-round picks to the Cavaliers and Raptors for James and Bosh (both signing six-year, $110.1 million contracts). Wade re-signed with the Heat for $107.59 million for six years. All three have early-termination clauses in their contracts, allowing them to become free agents again in four years, in the summer of 2014. The final year on all three deals, for 2015–16, is a player option. The three made their debut at the 2010 Summer Heat Welcome Party at the American Airlines Arena on July 9, where they were introduced as The Three Kings by Heat play-by-play announcer and event co-host Eric Reid. Howard Beck of The New York Times described the national fan reaction to the party: "Everyone saw something: greatness, arrogance, self-indulgence, boldness, cowardice, pride, friendship, collusion, joy, cynicism, heroes, mercenaries."

By taking less than maximum salaries, Wade, James and Bosh opened the door for the Heat to further continue its roster makeover with the re-signing of Udonis Haslem and signing of veteran swingman and teammate of Haslem at the University of Florida, Mike Miller, for dual five-year deals worth a combined $45 million. In order to fill the voids at forward and center, the Heat signed James's former teammate in Cleveland, Zydrunas Ilgauskas, to a two-year deal for the veteran's minimum at $2.8 million, re-signed Joel Anthony, and signed power forward Juwan Howard. In the guard department, the Miami Heat re-signed guard Carlos Arroyo and signed former Celtics player Eddie House to a two-year contract for the veteran's minimum of $2.8 million. Rookies Dexter Pittman and Da'Sean Butler, along with NBA Summer League standouts Patrick Beverley and Kenny Hasbrouck, also signed contracts.

The Miami Heat began the regular season with much hype going into their first game against the Eastern Conference Champs, the Boston Celtics. Many considered the Miami Heat as the team to break the single-season record of 72 regular season victories set by the Chicago Bulls. The opening game of the season, broadcast on the TNT Network and featuring the debut of reigning two-time NBA MVP James in a Miami uniform alongside Chris Bosh, was the most-watched NBA contest ever on cable television. The game earned a 4.6 rating, delivering 7.4 million total viewers and 5.3 million households, beating the Chicago Bulls vs. Los Angeles Lakers on February 2, 1996.

The Heat lost the opening game 88–80 and got off to a 9–8 start due in large part to inconsistent play and injuries of key role players Mike Miller (thumb) and Udonis Haslem (foot). After losing four out of five games, including a Saturday night loss to the Dallas Mavericks on November 27, the team called a players-only meeting with the intent to get players to communicate with each other. Much of the speculation was that Spoelstra could lose his job and that Heat president Pat Riley would return as coach, especially after a well publicized incident when James "bumped" into Spoelstra during a timeout.

After the players-only meeting, the team pulled together a 12-game win streak (10 of them by double digits) and limited the opposition under 100 points in all those games. During the winning streak, James led the Heat in defeating his former team by scoring 38 points (tying a Heat record for points in a quarter with 24 in the third) in a game that drew nearly 7.1 million viewers and earned a 25.4 rating in Miami. ESPN 3D aired its first NBA game in the third dimension on December 17, 2010, when the Heat defeated the New York Knicks at Madison Square Garden., The Heat set a franchise record for wins in December with 15 and set an NBA record for consecutive road victories in a calendar month with 10 (including the Christmas Day match-up with the reigning two-time champion Los Angeles Lakers, which the team won 96–80).

During a post-game chat with Sun Sports' Jason Jackson on January 3, 2011, LeBron James joked "I see we sell out 99.1 percent on the road, so we call ourselves the Heatles off the Beatles, so every time we take our show on the road we bring a great crowd", giving the Heat's trio the unofficial nickname.

On January 27, 2011, via fan voting, James (forward) and Wade (guard) were selected to be starters for the Eastern Conference at the All-Star Game, becoming the second pair of teammates to be selected as All-Star starters in franchise history (Shaquille O'Neal and Dwyane Wade; 2006 and 2007). A few days later, forward Chris Bosh was selected as a reserve, marking the first time in Heat history the team had sent three players to the All-Star game in a single season.

Like the 2005–06 championship season, the Heat were criticized, for being unable to beat the top-caliber teams of the NBA. This criticism though would just grow more and more as the regular season was beginning to wind down. Despite beating their division rival Orlando Magic two of three games, sweeping the Lakers 2–0, and beating both the San Antonio Spurs and the Thunder once, they had lost to the defending Eastern Conference champion Boston Celtics three times, swept by the Chicago Bulls and Dallas Mavericks who swept the season series and continued their regular season dominance against Miami for their 16th straight victory dating back to the 2004–05 season.

In order to improve for the playoffs, the Heat signed guard Mike Bibby, who agreed to forfeit the $6.2 million he was owed by the Washington Wizards for the next season so that he could become a free agent and sign a league-minimum contract with a contender. In the process, the Heat released Carlos Arroyo. In Bibby's first game on March 3, the Heat were leading the Magic by 24 points in the third quarter before the Heat were outscored 40–9 and lost 99–96. The following night against the Spurs, who held the NBA's best record (51–11), the Heat lost 125–95, their most lopsided loss of the year and their fourth loss in five games. In their next game against the Bulls, the Heat had a 12-point lead in the first half, but they ended up losing 87–86 after two failed shots by James and Wade in the last 6 seconds of the game. It was the Heat's 12th and 13th consecutive missed shots with a chance to tie or lead a game in the final 10 seconds of regulation or overtime. James had missed four in the four-game losing streak. It was the Heat's fourth straight loss, and the fourth time since February 24 they had lost after a double-digit lead. The Heat were 2–5 since the All-Star break, 5–13 in games decided by five or fewer points and 14–18 against teams with winning records. After the game, there were reports of players crying in the locker room afterwards. On March 10, the Heat beat the Lakers, 94–88, and ended their five-game losing streak while also ending the Lakers' eight-game winning streak.

On March 27, Wade, James, and Bosh became the second trio in NBA history to have at least 30 points and 10 rebounds in the same non-overtime game (a home win against the Houston Rockets), matching Oscar Robertson, Wayne Embry and Jack Twyman for the Cincinnati Royals in a loss to the Philadelphia Warriors on February 2, 1961. Additionally, it was the first time that a team's trio recorded 20 points and 10 rebounds in consecutive games since Sidney Wicks, Lloyd Neal and John Johnson accomplished the feat with the Portland Trail Blazers in March 1975. It was also the first time in Heat franchise history that three players scored 30 points in the same game.

The 2011 Heat finished with a 58–24 record, third best in team history and a second overall seed, behind the Chicago Bulls, who had the NBA's best record. Additionally, the Heat finished 5th in the NBA in attendance with 810,930, behind the Mavericks, Cavaliers, Trail Blazers, and Bulls in that order (100.9% capacity). The Heat faced the Philadelphia 76ers in the first round of the NBA Playoffs and eliminated them in five games. In the Eastern Conference Semi-finals, the Heat defeated their rival Boston Celtics in five games, winning a dramatic overtime Game 4 in Boston and a come-from-behind Game 5 victory at home to finish the series. In the Eastern Conference finals, the Heat faced the Chicago Bulls. After being blown out by 21 points by the Bulls in Game 1, the Heat took home-court by defeating Chicago in Game 2, and winning their home Games 3 and 4, the latter of which came in overtime. In Game 5 in Chicago, the Miami Heat made a historic comeback; after being down 77–65 with 3:14 left, the Heat went on an 18–3 run to win, 83–80, capped by a key four-point play from Wade and clutch shooting from James. The Heat advanced to the NBA Finals to face the Dallas Mavericks, who had defeated the Portland Trail Blazers, Los Angeles Lakers, and Oklahoma City Thunder. This series was a rematch of the 2006 NBA Finals, in which Dallas won the first two games and then lost four straight to Miami. The Heat won Game 1 in Miami, 92–84, but in Game 2, the Heat were leading the Mavericks by 15 points with 6:20 left in the fourth quarter before the Heat were outscored 22–5 and lost, 95–93. Miami won Game 3 in Dallas 88–86 with the game-winning basket scored by Chris Bosh. They would lose to the Mavericks in six games falling just short of capturing their 2nd NBA Championship. Dwyane Wade averaged 26.5 points and 7.0 rebounds, the highest scorer on the team, while LeBron James averaged 17.8 points, and 7.1 rebounds which was the largest drop off in points from a regular season to an NBA Finals in NBA history.
