= 2012 NBA Finals =

2012 basketball championship series

| Team | Coach | Wins |
|---|---|---|
| Miami Heat | Erik Spoelstra | 4 |
| Oklahoma City Thunder | Scott Brooks | 1 |
- Dates: June 12–21
- MVP: LeBron James (Miami Heat)
- Hall of Famers: Heat: Chris Bosh (2021); Dwyane Wade (2023); Officials: Danny Crawford (2025)
- Eastern finals: Heat defeated Celtics, 4–3
- Western finals: Thunder defeated Spurs, 4–2

The 2012 NBA Finals was the championship series of the National Basketball Association's (NBA) 2011–12 season, and the conclusion of the season's playoffs. In this best-of-seven series, the Eastern Conference champion Miami Heat defeated the Western Conference champion Oklahoma City Thunder in five games, winning their second championship in franchise history. The Heat's LeBron James, who was named the NBA Most Valuable Player (MVP) of the season, was voted the NBA Finals MVP, after averaging 28.6 points, 10.2 rebounds, and 7.4 assists.

The series started on June 12, and concluded on June 21. This marked Oklahoma City's first NBA Finals appearance since their relocation from Seattle, and their only one until 2025. The win by the Heat earned James his first championship.

== Background ==
=== Miami Heat ===
This was the second consecutive appearance for the Heat, after losing to the Dallas Mavericks in 2011. This was also their second Finals appearance in the "Big Three" era, being led by superstar LeBron James, shooting guard Dwyane Wade, and power forward Chris Bosh. Their other Finals appearance was in 2006, when they defeated the Mavericks to win their first NBA title.

In the regular season, the Heat finished with 46 wins, earning the second seed in the Eastern Conference. In the first round, they defeated the New York Knicks 4–1, marking the first time since 1997 that the Heat beat their arch rivals in the postseason. In the next two rounds, the Heat overcame major series deficits that nearly eliminated them from the postseason, but survived thanks to a string of victories. In the Conference semifinals, they defeated the Indiana Pacers 4–2 despite trailing 2–1 and losing Chris Bosh to injury. Then, the Heat survived a grueling Eastern Conference finals against the Boston Celtics, winning 4–3 despite trailing 3–2. The Heat's comeback vs the Celtics was extremely notable thanks to LeBron James’ epic 45 point performance in Game 6, allowing the Heat to win Game 7 at home and advance to the Finals. The Heat also became the first team since the 1994–95 Houston Rockets to overcome multiple series deficits en route to the finals. Overall, James took over more of the scoring responsibility from Wade in his second season in Miami, as he was rewarded with the NBA regular season's Most Valuable Player.

The 2011–2012 Miami Heat included several new players that had not played for the team during its 2011 Finals run, including Shane Battier, Eddy Curry, Ronny Turiaf, and rookies Terrel Harris and Norris Cole.

=== Oklahoma City Thunder ===
This was the Thunder's first NBA Finals appearance since the team relocated from Seattle to Oklahoma City in 2008. Including their seasons as the Seattle SuperSonics, this was also the club's fourth Finals appearance, and first since 1996, when they lost to the Michael Jordan-led Chicago Bulls. The team was seeking their first NBA championship since 1979.

The Thunder finished with 47 wins, placing them as the second seed in the Western Conference. During the playoffs, they defeated the last three Western Conference finalists in sequential order. First, they dethroned the defending champion Dallas Mavericks in a 4–0 first round sweep. Next, they dispatched the Los Angeles Lakers in the conference semifinals 4–1. Then, in the Western Conference finals, they defeated the top seeded San Antonio Spurs 4–2, despite losing the first two games, snapping San Antonio's 20 game winning streak in the process.

The Thunder entered the Finals as the second-youngest finalists in NBA history. In addition, Daequan Cook faced the team that traded him to the Thunder in 2010.

=== Road to the Finals ===
| Oklahoma City Thunder (Western Conference champion) | | Miami Heat (Eastern Conference champion) |
|---|---|---|
| Western Conference: # / Team / W / L / PCT / GB / GP; 1 / c-San Antonio Spurs * / 50 / 16 / .758 / – / 66; 2 / y-Oklahoma City Thunder * / 47 / 19 / .712 / 3.0 / 66; 3 / y-Los Angeles Lakers * / 41 / 25 / .621 / 9.0 / 66; 4 / x-Memphis Grizzlies / 41 / 25 / .621 / 9.0 / 66; 5 / x-Los Angeles Clippers / 40 / 26 / .606 / 10.0 / 66; 6 / x-Denver Nuggets / 38 / 28 / .576 / 12.0 / 66; 7 / x-Dallas Mavericks / 36 / 30 / .545 / 14.0 / 66; 8 / x-Utah Jazz / 36 / 30 / .545 / 14.0 / 66; 9 / Houston Rockets / 34 / 32 / .515 / 16.0 / 66; 10 / Phoenix Suns / 33 / 33 / .500 / 17.0 / 66; 11 / Portland Trail Blazers / 28 / 38 / .424 / 22.0 / 66; 12 / Minnesota Timberwolves / 26 / 40 / .394 / 24.0 / 66; 13 / Golden State Warriors / 23 / 43 / .348 / 27.0 / 66; 14 / Sacramento Kings / 22 / 44 / .333 / 28.0 / 66; 15 / New Orleans Hornets / 21 / 45 / .318 / 29.0 / 66; 2nd seed in the West, 3rd best league record | Regular season | Eastern Conference: # / Team / W / L / PCT / GB / GP; 1 / z-Chicago Bulls / 50 / 16 / .758 / – / 66; 2 / y-Miami Heat * / 46 / 20 / .697 / 4.0 / 66; 3 / x-Indiana Pacers * / 42 / 24 / .636 / 8.0 / 66; 4 / y-Boston Celtics / 39 / 27 / .591 / 11.0 / 66; 5 / x-Atlanta Hawks / 40 / 26 / .606 / 10.0 / 66; 6 / x-Orlando Magic / 37 / 29 / .561 / 13.0 / 66; 7 / x-New York Knicks / 36 / 30 / .545 / 14.0 / 66; 8 / x-Philadelphia 76ers / 35 / 31 / .530 / 15.0 / 66; 9 / Milwaukee Bucks / 31 / 35 / .470 / 19.0 / 66; 10 / Detroit Pistons / 25 / 41 / .379 / 25.0 / 66; 11 / Toronto Raptors / 23 / 43 / .348 / 27.0 / 66; 12 / New Jersey Nets / 22 / 44 / .333 / 28.0 / 66; 13 / Cleveland Cavaliers / 21 / 45 / .318 / 29.0 / 66; 14 / Washington Wizards / 20 / 46 / .303 / 30.0 / 66; 15 / Charlotte Bobcats / 7 / 59 / .106 / 43.0 / 66; 2nd seed in the East, 4th best league record |
| Defeated the 7th seeded Dallas Mavericks, 4–0 | First round | Defeated the 7th seeded New York Knicks, 4–1 |
| Defeated the 3rd seeded Los Angeles Lakers, 4–1 | Conference semifinals | Defeated the 3rd seeded Indiana Pacers, 4–2 |
| Defeated the 1st seeded San Antonio Spurs, 4–2 | Conference finals | Defeated the 4th seeded Boston Celtics, 4–3 |

=== Regular season series ===
The season series was tied, 1–1, with both teams winning at their home floor.

March 25, 2012

Recap

Miami Heat 87, Oklahoma City Thunder 103

Chesapeake Energy Arena, Oklahoma City, Oklahoma

April 4, 2012

Recap

Oklahoma City Thunder 93, Miami Heat 98

American Airlines Arena, Miami, Florida

== Series summary ==
| Game | Date | Road team | Result | Home team |
|---|---|---|---|---|
| Game 1 | June 12 | Miami Heat | 94–105 (0–1) | Oklahoma City Thunder |
| Game 2 | June 14 | Miami Heat | 100–96 (1–1) | Oklahoma City Thunder |
| Game 3 | June 17 | Oklahoma City Thunder | 85–91 (1–2) | Miami Heat |
| Game 4 | June 19 | Oklahoma City Thunder | 98–104 (1–3) | Miami Heat |
| Game 5 | June 21 | Oklahoma City Thunder | 106–121 (1–4) | Miami Heat |

== Game summaries ==
All times are in Eastern Daylight Time (UTC−4)

=== Game 1 ===
ABC

June 12
9:00 pm

Recap

Miami Heat 94, Oklahoma City Thunder 105
Scoring by quarter: 29–22, 25–25, 19–27, 21–31
| Pts: LeBron James 30; Rebs: Udonis Haslem 11; Asts: Dwyane Wade 8 | Pts: Kevin Durant 36; Rebs: Nick Collison 10; Asts: Russell Westbrook 11 |
Oklahoma City leads series, 1–0

Chesapeake Energy Arena, Oklahoma City, Oklahoma
Attendance: 18,203
Referees:
- No. 13 Monty McCutchen
- No. 14 Ed Malloy
- No. 9 Derrick Stafford

The Thunder defeated the Heat, 105–94, in Game 1. Miami held the lead for most of the first three quarters, including a 13-point lead at one point during the second quarter. The Heat made five three-pointers to jump to a 29–22 lead by the end of the first quarter, but Oklahoma City kept on pace with Miami to keep the score at 54–47 by halftime. The Thunder then took the lead for good with 16 seconds left in the third quarter after Russell Westbrook made a free throw to make it 74–73. Kevin Durant led Oklahoma City with 36 points, while Westbrook had 27. LeBron James led the Heat with 30 points, but was held to one basket during the first eight minutes of the fourth quarter.

=== Game 2 ===
ABC

June 14
9:00 pm

Recap

Miami Heat 100, Oklahoma City Thunder 96
Scoring by quarter: 27–15, 28–28, 23–24, 22–29
| Pts: LeBron James 32; Rebs: Chris Bosh 15; Asts: James, Wade 5 each | Pts: Kevin Durant 32; Rebs: Perkins, Westbrook 8 each Asts: Russell Westbrook 7 |
Series tied, 1–1

Chesapeake Energy Arena, Oklahoma City, Oklahoma
Attendance: 18,203
Referees:
- No. 43 Dan Crawford
- No. 25 Tony Brothers
- No. 49 Tom Washington

The Heat defeated the Thunder 100–96 in Game 2, tying the series at one game a piece and giving the Thunder their first home playoff loss of the season. Miami never trailed, building a 27–15 first quarter lead, and holding a 17-point advantage at one point. The Thunder attempted a comeback in the fourth quarter, and with 37 seconds left in the game, Oklahoma City's Kevin Durant made a three-pointer to cut the deficit, 98–96. Durant would miss a game-tying jumper in the closing seconds as Miami held off Oklahoma City for the Game 2 win. The play did not come without controversy however as many observers had felt that James had fouled Durant on the right hip during the shot, a potential sixth foul that would have taken the Heat superstar out of the game in the process. LeBron James led the Heat with 32 points, while Durant scored 32 of his own to lead the Thunder.

=== Game 3 ===
ABC

June 17
8:00 pm

Recap

Oklahoma City Thunder 85, Miami Heat 91
Scoring by quarter: 20–26, 26–21, 21–22, 18–22
| Pts: Kevin Durant 25; Rebs: Kendrick Perkins 12; Asts: James Harden 6 | Pts: LeBron James 29; Rebs: LeBron James 14; Asts: Dwyane Wade 7 |
Miami leads series, 2–1

American Airlines Arena, Miami, Florida
Attendance: 20,003
Referees:
- No. 17 Joe Crawford
- No. 19 James Capers
- No. 41 Ken Mauer

Miami won Game 3, 91–85, to go up two games to one in the series. Miami had a slim 47–46 halftime lead before Oklahoma City began the third quarter with a 10–4 run, eventually building a 10-point lead midway through the period. However, Miami scored the last seven points in the third quarter to regain the lead at 69–67. With 7:36 remaining in the game, the Thunder came back to retake the lead at 77–76, but the Heat then scored eight unanswered points to build an 84–77 advantage with 3:47 left. A 6–0 run by Oklahoma City pulled them within one point of Miami with 90 seconds left, but the Thunder could not score again for the rest of the game while the Heat made five insurance free throws. LeBron James led the Heat with 29 points and 14 rebounds, while Kevin Durant scored 25 points to lead the Thunder.

=== Game 4 ===
ABC

June 19
9:00 pm

Recap

Oklahoma City Thunder 98, Miami Heat 104
Scoring by quarter: 33–19, 16–27, 26–33, 23–25
| Pts: Russell Westbrook 43; Rebs: James Harden 10; Asts: Russell Westbrook 5 | Pts: LeBron James 26; Rebs: Bosh, James 9 each Asts: LeBron James 12 |
Miami leads series, 3–1

American Airlines Arena, Miami, Florida
Attendance: 20,003
Referees:
- No. 48 Scott Foster
- No. 24 Mike Callahan
- No. 55 Bill Kennedy

Miami won Game 4, 104–98, to go up three games to one in the series. The Thunder jumped to a 33–19 lead by the end the first quarter, but the Heat rallied to cut the score to 49–46 at halftime, thanks to two huge three-pointers by Heat rookie Norris Cole. The two teams remained neck-and-neck throughout most of the third quarter, with Miami holding a 4-point lead at the start of fourth period. However, for the final 16 minutes of the game, Russell Westbrook (who led the Thunder with 43 points) and Kevin Durant (who had 28 points) were the only two Oklahoma City players able to score. With the other Thunder players struggling to make their shots, Miami was able to pull away in the end, largely thanks to late-game heroics from LeBron James, Mario Chalmers and Dwyane Wade. LeBron James led the Heat with 26 points, including the go ahead three pointer, but had to sit out during the final two minutes of the game due to leg cramps. Mario Chalmers scored 25 points and made two key plays to seal Miami's win: a driving layup around a well-positioned Serge Ibaka and two free throws after a rare mistake by Westbrook (he fouled Chalmers after the point guard recovered Shane Battier's tip on a jump ball with less than 1 minute left, thinking that the shot clock would reset, while NBA rules do not reset at that point in a 4th quarter if the team that previously had the ball re-gains possession off the tip).

=== Game 5 ===
ABC

June 21
9:00 pm

Recap

Oklahoma City Thunder 106, Miami Heat 121
Scoring by quarter: 26–31, 23–28, 22–36, 35–26
| Pts: Kevin Durant 32; Rebs: Kevin Durant 11; Asts: Russell Westbrook 6 | Pts: LeBron James 26; Rebs: LeBron James 11; Asts: LeBron James 13 |
Miami wins NBA Finals, 4–1

American Airlines Arena, Miami, Florida
Attendance: 20,003
Referees:
- No. 43 Dan Crawford
- No. 13 Monty McCutchen
- No. 9 Derrick Stafford

Miami won Game 5, 121–106, to win the series, four games to one. After keeping it a close game in the first half, the Thunder were outscored 36–22 in the third quarter, with Miami leading as much as 27 at one point. Miami was fueled by strong performances by their "Big Three" of LeBron James, Dwyane Wade, and Chris Bosh, as well as by Mike Miller, who was 7 for 8 for three-pointers, ending the night with 23 points. Miller only entered the game because Wade encountered foul trouble in the first half, with Coach Erik Spoelstra telling the variously injured veteran the Heat just needed him to hold the fort until the 2nd quarter began; when Miller hit two three-pointers, Spoelstra asked him if he could keep playing and Miller said yes, leading to 23 minutes on the court that were critical in blowing the game open for Miami. The team tied an NBA Finals record for most 3-pointers in a game with 14. With three minutes remaining in the game, both teams took their starters out of the game, with the Heat still leading by more than 20 points. With their Game 5 win, the Heat won their second NBA championship in team history, and the first for several Heat players, including James, who was named the NBA Finals MVP after averaging 28.6 points, 10.2 rebounds and 7.4 assists in the finals, capping it all off with his first triple double of the season in the final game. For the Thunder, Kevin Durant had 32 points, and 11 rebounds; Russell Westbrook had 19 points and 6 assists; and James Harden led the bench with 19 points, 5 assists, and 4 rebounds.

== Rosters ==
=== Miami Heat ===
2011–12 Miami Heat roster
Players

| Pos. | No. | Player | Height | Weight | DOB | From |
|---|---|---|---|---|---|---|
| F/C | 50 | Joel Anthony | 6 ft 9 in (2.06 m) | 245 lb (111 kg) | 1982–08–09 | UNLV |
| F | 31 | Shane Battier | 6 ft 8 in (2.03 m) | 220 lb (100 kg) | 1978–09–09 | Duke |
| F | 1 | Chris Bosh | 6 ft 11 in (2.11 m) | 235 lb (107 kg) | 1984–03–24 | Georgia Tech |
| G | 15 | Mario Chalmers | 6 ft 2 in (1.88 m) | 190 lb (86 kg) | 1986–05–19 | Kansas |
| G | 30 | Norris Cole | 6 ft 2 in (1.88 m) | 170 lb (77 kg) | 1988–10–13 | Cleveland State |
| C | 34 | Eddy Curry | 7 ft 0 in (2.13 m) | 295 lb (134 kg) | 1982–12–05 | Thornwood HS (IL) |
| G | 14 | Terrel Harris | 6 ft 5 in (1.96 m) | 190 lb (86 kg) | 1987–08–10 | Oklahoma State |
| F/C | 40 | Udonis Haslem | 6 ft 8 in (2.03 m) | 235 lb (107 kg) | 1980–06–09 | Florida |
| F | 5 | Juwan Howard | 6 ft 9 in (2.06 m) | 250 lb (113 kg) | 1973–02–07 | Michigan |
| F | 6 | LeBron James | 6 ft 8 in (2.03 m) | 250 lb (113 kg) | 1984–12–30 | St. Vincent–St. Mary HS (OH) |
| F | 22 | James Jones | 6 ft 8 in (2.03 m) | 215 lb (98 kg) | 1980–10–04 | Miami (FL) |
| F | 13 | Mike Miller | 6 ft 8 in (2.03 m) | 218 lb (99 kg) | 1980–02–19 | Florida |
| C | 45 | Dexter Pittman | 6 ft 11 in (2.11 m) | 285 lb (129 kg) | 1988–03–02 | Texas |
| F/C | 21 | Ronny Turiaf | 6 ft 10 in (2.08 m) | 246 lb (112 kg) | 1983–01–13 | Gonzaga |
| G | 3 | Dwyane Wade | 6 ft 4 in (1.93 m) | 220 lb (100 kg) | 1982–01–17 | Marquette |

Coaches
Head coach
- Erik Spoelstra
Assistant(s)
- Bob McAdoo
- Keith Askins
- Ron Rothstein
- David Fizdale
- Chad Kammerer
- Octavio De La Grana

Legend
- (DP) Unsigned draft pick
- (FA) Free agent
- (S) Suspended
- (DL) On assignment to D-League affiliate
- Injured

=== Oklahoma City Thunder ===
2011–12 Oklahoma City Thunder roster
Players

| Pos. | No. | Player | Height | Weight | DOB | From |
|---|---|---|---|---|---|---|
| C | 45 | Cole Aldrich | 6 ft 11 in (2.11 m) | 245 lb (111 kg) | 1988–10–31 | Kansas |
| F/C | 4 | Nick Collison | 6 ft 10 in (2.08 m) | 255 lb (116 kg) | 1980–10–26 | Kansas |
| G | 14 | Daequan Cook | 6 ft 5 in (1.96 m) | 210 lb (95 kg) | 1987–04–28 | Ohio State |
| G/F | 35 | Kevin Durant | 6 ft 9 in (2.06 m) | 230 lb (104 kg) | 1988–09–29 | Texas |
| G | 37 | Derek Fisher | 6 ft 1 in (1.85 m) | 210 lb (95 kg) | 1974–08–09 | Little Rock |
| G | 13 | James Harden | 6 ft 5 in (1.96 m) | 220 lb (100 kg) | 1989–08–26 | Arizona State |
| F | 11 | Lazar Hayward | 6 ft 6 in (1.98 m) | 225 lb (102 kg) | 1986–11–26 | Marquette |
| F | 9 | Serge Ibaka | 6 ft 10 in (2.08 m) | 235 lb (107 kg) | 1989–09–18 | Republic of the Congo |
| G | 7 | Royal Ivey | 6 ft 4 in (1.93 m) | 215 lb (98 kg) | 1981–12–20 | Texas |
| G | 15 | Reggie Jackson | 6 ft 3 in (1.91 m) | 208 lb (94 kg) | 1990–04–16 | Boston College |
| G | 6 | Eric Maynor | 6 ft 3 in (1.91 m) | 175 lb (79 kg) | 1987–06–11 | VCU |
| C | 8 | Nazr Mohammed | 6 ft 10 in (2.08 m) | 250 lb (113 kg) | 1977–09–05 | Kentucky |
| C | 5 | Kendrick Perkins | 6 ft 10 in (2.08 m) | 267 lb (121 kg) | 1984–11–10 | Clifton J. Ozen HS (TX) |
| G/F | 2 | Thabo Sefolosha | 6 ft 7 in (2.01 m) | 215 lb (98 kg) | 1984–05–02 | Switzerland |
| G | 0 | Russell Westbrook | 6 ft 3 in (1.91 m) | 187 lb (85 kg) | 1988–11–12 | UCLA |

Coaches
Head coach
- Scott Brooks
Assistant(s)
- Mark Bryant
- Maurice Cheeks
- Rex Kalamian
- Brian Keefe
- Maz Trakh

Legend
- (DP) Unsigned draft pick
- (FA) Free agent
- (S) Suspended
- (DL) On assignment to D-League affiliate
- Injured

== Player statistics ==
Legend
| GP | Games played | GS | Games started | MPG | Minutes per game |
| FG% | Field-goal percentage | 3P% | 3-point field-goal percentage | FT% | Free-throw percentage |
| RPG | Rebounds per game | APG | Assists per game | SPG | Steals per game |
| BPG | Blocks per game | PPG | Points per game |

Miami Heat

Miami Heat statistics
| Player | GP | GS | MPG | FG% | 3P% | FT% | RPG | APG | SPG | BPG | PPG |
|---|---|---|---|---|---|---|---|---|---|---|---|
| Joel Anthony | 1 | 0 | 2.1 | .000 | .000 | .000 | 0.0 | 0.0 | 0.0 | 0.0 | 0.0 |
| Shane Battier | 5 | 5 | 37.5 | .613 | .577 | .714 | 3.4 | 0.4 | 0.8 | 0.0 | 11.6 |
| Chris Bosh | 5 | 4 | 36.6 | .452 | .400 | .882 | 9.4 | 0.2 | 0.6 | 1.2 | 14.6 |
| Mario Chalmers | 5 | 5 | 36.5 | .442 | .348 | .857 | 2.6 | 4.0 | 1.8 | 0.4 | 10.4 |
| Norris Cole | 4 | 0 | 11.0 | .333 | .429 | .000 | 1.0 | 0.0 | 0.0 | 0.0 | 3.3 |
| Terrel Harris | 1 | 0 | 3.0 | .000 | .000 | .750 | 1.0 | 0.0 | 0.0 | 0.0 | 3.0 |
| Udonis Haslem | 5 | 1 | 16.3 | .400 | .000 | .833 | 4.4 | 0.4 | 0.0 | 0.4 | 2.6 |
| Juwan Howard | 1 | 0 | 3.0 | .000 | .000 | .000 | 0.0 | 0.0 | 0.0 | 0.0 | 0.0 |
| LeBron James | 5 | 5 | 44.1 | .472 | .188 | .826 | 10.2 | 7.4 | 1.6 | 0.4 | 28.6 |
| James Jones | 4 | 0 | 10.7 | .500 | .400 | 1.000 | 1.5 | 0.0 | 0.3 | 0.0 | 2.8 |
| Mike Miller | 5 | 0 | 8.9 | .563 | .636 | 1.000 | 1.8 | 0.4 | 0.2 | 0.2 | 6.2 |
| Ronny Turiaf | 1 | 0 | 3.0 | .000 | .000 | .000 | 1.0 | 0.0 | 0.0 | 0.0 | 0.0 |
| Dwyane Wade | 5 | 5 | 40.6 | .435 | .400 | .775 | 6.0 | 5.2 | 1.4 | 1.2 | 22.6 |

Oklahoma City Thunder

Oklahoma City Thunder statistics
| Player | GP | GS | MPG | FG% | 3P% | FT% | RPG | APG | SPG | BPG | PPG |
|---|---|---|---|---|---|---|---|---|---|---|---|
| Cole Aldrich | 1 | 0 | 4.7 | 1.000 | .000 | .000 | 1.0 | 0.0 | 0.0 | 0.0 | 2.0 |
| Nick Collison | 5 | 0 | 16.6 | .600 | .000 | .000 | 4.6 | 0.6 | 0.6 | 0.2 | 3.6 |
| Daequan Cook | 3 | 0 | 3.5 | .333 | .000 | .000 | 0.0 | 0.3 | 0.0 | 0.0 | 0.7 |
| Kevin Durant | 5 | 5 | 42.6 | .548 | .394 | .839 | 6.0 | 2.2 | 1.4 | 1.0 | 30.6 |
| Derek Fisher | 5 | 0 | 25.6 | .423 | .357 | 1.000 | 1.6 | 0.8 | 1.0 | 0.0 | 5.6 |
| James Harden | 5 | 0 | 32.8 | .375 | .318 | .792 | 4.8 | 3.6 | 1.2 | 0.0 | 12.4 |
| Lazar Hayward | 1 | 0 | 4.7 | .500 | .000 | .000 | 2.0 | 0.0 | 0.0 | 0.0 | 2.0 |
| Serge Ibaka | 5 | 5 | 26.3 | .424 | .000 | .636 | 5.2 | 0.8 | 0.4 | 2.0 | 7.0 |
| Royal Ivey | 1 | 0 | 3.0 | 1.000 | 1.000 | .000 | 0.0 | 0.0 | 0.0 | 0.0 | 6.0 |
| Kendrick Perkins | 5 | 5 | 23.2 | .429 | .000 | .750 | 6.8 | 0.0 | 0.2 | 0.6 | 4.8 |
| Thabo Sefolosha | 5 | 5 | 25.9 | .296 | .182 | .833 | 2.0 | 1.0 | 1.4 | 0.8 | 4.6 |
| Russell Westbrook | 5 | 5 | 42.3 | .433 | .136 | .824 | 6.4 | 6.6 | 1.0 | 0.4 | 27.0 |

== Broadcast ==
In the United States, the NBA Finals aired on ABC and Mike Breen and Jeff Van Gundy served as commentators. Local ABC stations for the competing teams were WPLG (Miami) and KOCO-TV (Oklahoma City). ESPN Radio aired it as well and had Jim Durham, Jack Ramsay and Hubie Brown as commentators.

| Game | Ratings (households) | Share (households) | American audience (in millions) |
|---|---|---|---|
| 1 | 9.9 | 16 | 16.195 |
| 2 | 10.4 | 18 | 16.670 |
| 3 | 8.8 | 15 | 15.549 |
| 4 | 10.5 | 17 | 17.455 |
| 5 | 10.9 | 18 | 18.461 |

== Aftermath ==
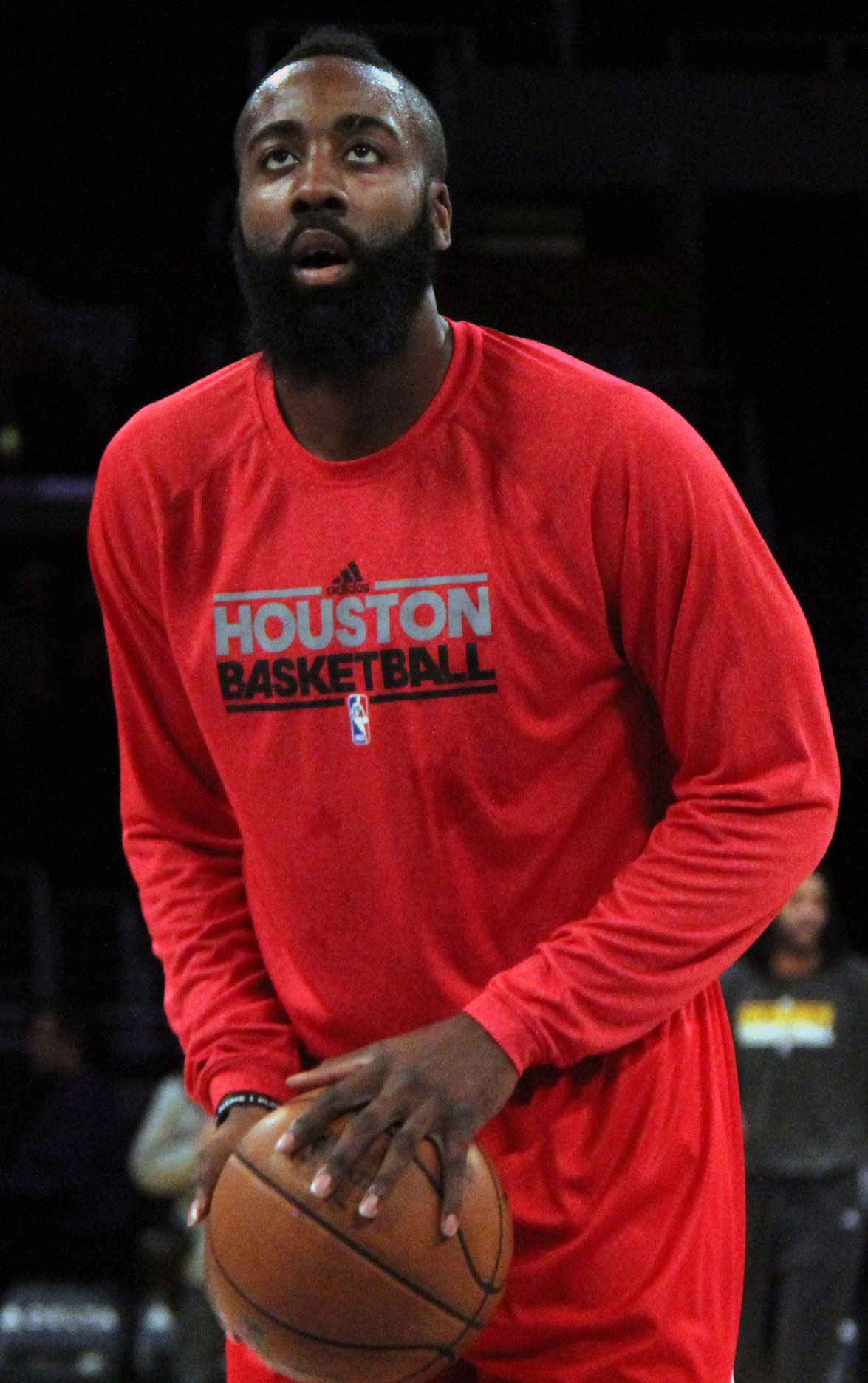
Harden with the Rockets in 2012

After failing to agree on a contract extension with the Thunder, James Harden was traded to the Houston Rockets on October 27, 2012, along with Daequan Cook, Cole Aldrich and Lazar Hayward, in exchange for Kevin Martin, Jeremy Lamb, two first-round picks (which became Steven Adams in 2013 and Mitch McGary in 2014), and a second-round pick (which became Álex Abrines in 2013). This move for the Thunder proved to be a mistake in hindsight, as Harden would go on to become an MVP-caliber player in Houston, winning the award in 2018 and coming in second three times. The Thunder, however, did receive Steven Adams in the deal, who became a fixture at center for the team for a number of years. Harden's Rockets later defeated OKC in the playoffs in 2017 and 2020.

The Oklahoma City dynasty many fans and NBA analysts predicted did not end up coming true. They would win 60 games the following season, but a Russell Westbrook knee injury caused their season to stall in an upset to the Memphis Grizzlies in the second round. The core's last opportunity at a championship was in the 2016 playoffs. That year, the Thunder took a 3 games to 1 series lead on the 73-win Golden State Warriors. However, they could not finish the job and lost the next three games, in what is considered one of the best non-Finals series in NBA history. Following the defeat, Kevin Durant left the team for the Warriors in free agency a month later, which essentially ended their championship window with the Westbrook-Durant-Harden-Ibaka core. The Thunder would not seriously contend for a championship until the next decade.

Kevin Durant and LeBron James faced each other twice more in the Finals in the decade, although both players were on different teams. Durant and the Warriors defeated James' Cavaliers in 2017 and 2018, going a cumulative 8–1 in both series.

The Thunder retooled in following years after losing Russell Westbrook in a 2019 trade. They would acquire several prospects, including future MVP Shai Gilgeous-Alexander, defensive specialist Luguentz Dort, and future All-Stars Jalen Williams and Chet Holmgren. Eventually, they defeated the Indiana Pacers in the 2025 NBA Finals to win their first championship since moving to Oklahoma City from Seattle.
