= Cammerer =

Cammerer may refer to:

- Mount Cammerer, a mountain on the Great Smoky Mountains, south-eastern United States
- Arno B. Cammerer (1883–1941), the 3rd director of the U.S. National Park Service
- Helmut Cämmerer (1911–1997), German sprint canoer
- Cämmerer See, lake in Mecklenburg-Vorpommern, Germany

== See also ==
- Kammerer
