= Dexter Pittman =

American basketball player (born 1988)

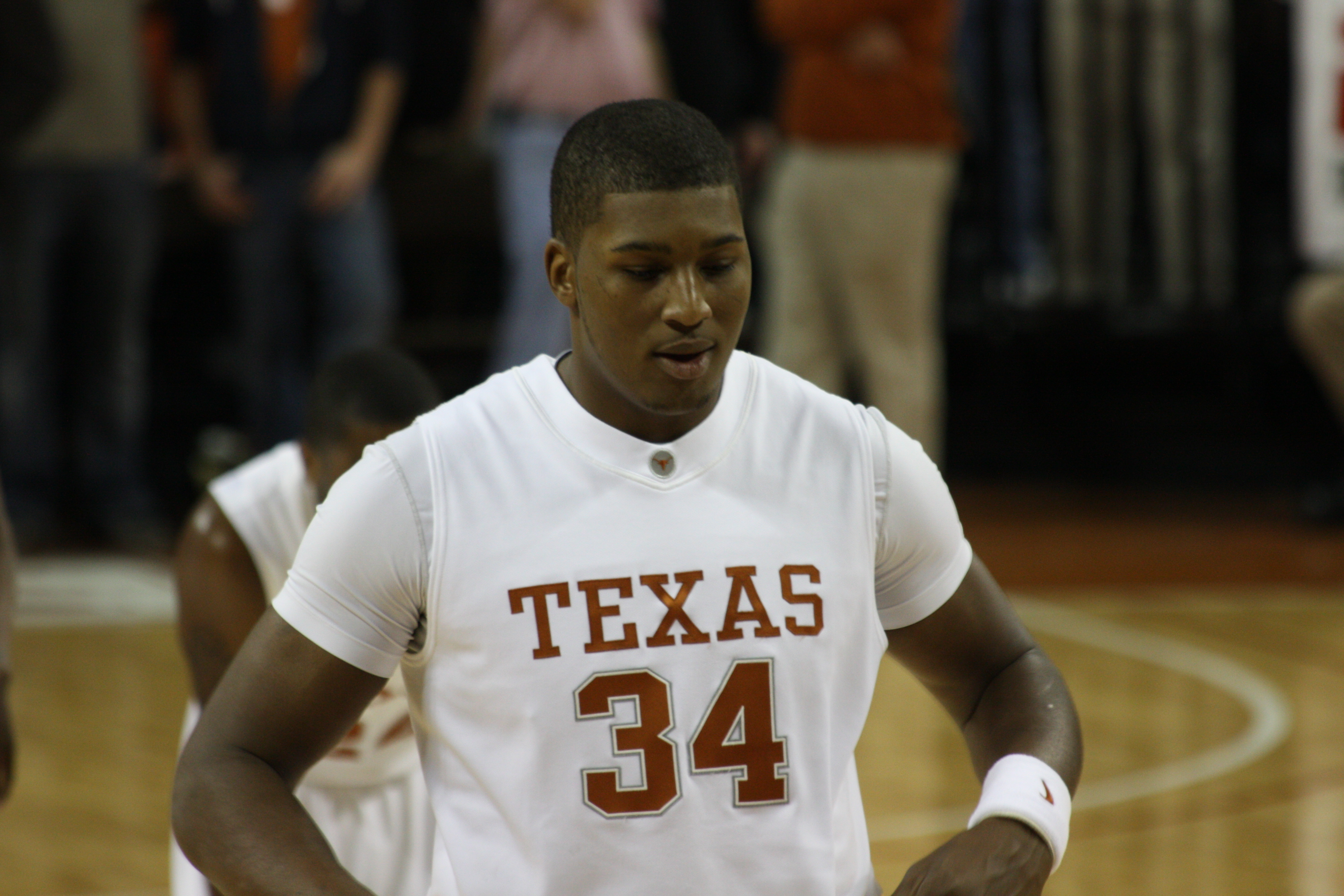
- Pittman during a home game at the Frank Erwin Center against the University of Missouri, February 2009

Personal information
- Born: March 2, 1988 (age 38) Houston, Texas, U.S.
- Listed height: 6 ft 11 in (2.11 m)
- Listed weight: 285 lb (129 kg)

Career information
- High school: B. F. Terry (Rosenberg, Texas)
- College: Texas (2006–2010)
- NBA draft: 2010: 2nd round, 32nd overall pick
- Drafted by: Miami Heat
- Playing career: 2010–2023
- Position: Center
- Number: 45

Career history
- 2010–2013: Miami Heat
- 2010–2011, 2012–2013: →Sioux Falls Skyforce
- 2013: Memphis Grizzlies
- 2013: Foshan Long Lions
- 2013–2014: Austin Toros
- 2014: Atlanta Hawks
- 2014: Caciques de Humacao
- 2014–2015: TED Ankara Kolejliler
- 2015–2016: Virtus Bologna
- 2016: Santeros de Aguada
- 2016–2018: Toyama Grouses
- 2018–2019: Rizing Zephyr Fukuoka
- 2019–2020: Al-Ahli
- 2021–2022: Al-Sharjah
- 2022–2023: Al-Qurain SC
- 2023: Guaiqueríes de Margarita

Career highlights
- NBA champion (2012); NBA D-League All-Star (2011)
- Stats at NBA.com
- Stats at Basketball Reference

Dexter Jerome Pittman (born March 2, 1988) is an American former professional basketball player. He played college basketball for the Texas Longhorns.

== High school career ==
Pittman was a three-year starter at B. F. Terry High School, where he averaged 15 points and 8.5 rebounds per game over his career. In his senior season, he was named the Most Valuable Player for District 24-4A.

Considered a three-star recruit by Rivals.com, Pittman was listed as the No. 16 center and the No. 150 player in the nation in 2006.

== College career ==
Pittman was used sparingly in his first two seasons at Texas, averaging less than 3 points per game with just one start. As a junior, he started 24 games–averaging 10 points and 5.5 rebounds per game–and became one of the most dominant centers in the Big 12 conference.

=== Weight loss ===
Pittman weighed 388 lbs as a senior at Terry High School. After receiving weight loss tips from Texas' Strength and conditioning coach Todd Wright, he was able to drop his weight to 366 lbs before enrolling at Texas. Pittman's weight still prevented him from doing basic drills in practice, which caused various back and knee aches. He dedicated himself to a workout program with Wright including 5:30 a.m. workouts and a complete revamp of his diet. Pittman agreed to call Wright before every meal to evaluate his choices. Pittman later characterized the workout regimen as being so tough that "I wanted to cry and say, 'Man, I want to give up'". Since losing almost 100 pounds, he has become an icon for admirers, like Hall of Famer Charles Barkley, who heard about his weight loss.

=== College statistics ===
Year	Team	GP	GS	MPG	FG%	3P%	FT%	RPG	APG	SPG	BPG	PPG
2006–07	Texas Longhorns	29	0	5.3	.604	.000	.471	1.8	.1	.2	.3	2.6
2007–08	Texas Longhorns	36	1	6.8	.559	.000	.561	2.4	.2	.1	.5	2.8
2008–09	Texas Longhorns	35	24	16.6	.616	.000	.691	5.5	.4	.4	.9	10.1
2009–10	Texas Longhorns	34	34	19.1	.654	.000	.556	5.9	.5	.4	1.9	10.4
Career		134	59	12.2	.623	.000	.601	3.9	.3	.2	.9	6.6

== Professional career ==
Pittman was selected with the 32nd overall pick in the 2010 NBA draft by the Miami Heat. On July 16, 2010, he signed a multi-year deal with the Heat. On November 26, 2010, Pittman was assigned to the Sioux Falls Skyforce. On December 18, 2010, he was recalled by the Heat. On January 6, 2011, he was reassigned to the Skyforce. He was selected to the 2011 NBA D-League All-Star game. Pittman made his NBA debut on April 1, 2011, against the Minnesota Timberwolves. The Heat made it to the 2011 NBA Finals but lost to the Dallas Mavericks in six games.

On April 13, 2012, Pittman scored a career high 16 points in a 105–82 win against the Charlotte Bobcats. In Game 5 of the 2012 Conference semi-finals against the Indiana Pacers, he was assessed a flagrant foul after he came across the lane and used his forearm to hit Lance Stephenson of the Pacers with 19.4 seconds left in the game. Pittman was later suspended for three games due to the incident. The Heat advanced to the 2012 NBA Finals and won the series against Oklahoma City Thunder in five games, giving Pittman his first championship.

During the 2012–13 season, Pittman was assigned multiple times to the Skyforce. On February 21, 2013, the Heat traded Pittman and a second round pick to the Memphis Grizzlies for a trade exception and the rights to Ricky Sanchez. On April 14, 2013, he was waived by the Grizzlies.

Pittman joined the San Antonio Spurs for the 2013 NBA Summer League. In September 2013, he signed with the Chicago Bulls. However, he was later waived by the Bulls on October 26, 2013. On November 27, 2013, Pittman was acquired by the Springfield Armor. However, his contract was bought out by the Armor on December 3, before he appeared in a game for them. He then signed with the Foshan Long Lions of China as an injury-replacement for Shavlik Randolph. Later that month, he left Foshan after seven games.

On January 6, 2014, Pittman was acquired by the Austin Toros. On February 22, 2014, Pittman signed a 10-day contract with the Atlanta Hawks. Pittman's final NBA game was on February 26, 2014, in a 104–115 loss to the Boston Celtics. In that game, Pittman only played 30 seconds and didn't record a single statistic. On February 27, 2014, he was waived by the Hawks. On March 2, 2014, he was reacquired by the Toros. On April 10, 2014, he signed with the Houston Rockets. A few days later, he was released by the Rockets before appearing in a game for them.

On April 19, 2014, Pittman signed with Caciques de Humacao for the 2014 BSN season. On September 29, 2014, Pittman signed with the Atlanta Hawks. However, he was later waived by the Hawks on October 21, 2014. On November 27, 2014, he signed with TED Ankara of Turkey for the rest of the 2014–15 season.

On June 26, 2015, he signed with Virtus Bologna of the Italian Lega Basket Serie A for the 2015–16 season. On May 12, 2016, Pittman was acquired by Santeros de Aguada of the Puerto Rican League.

On December 16, 2016, Pittman signed with Toyama Grouses of the Japanese B.League. During the 2017–18 season he posted 11.5 points and 6 rebounds per game. He signed with B.League team Rizing Zephyr Fukuoka on September 20, 2018. On October 9, 2021, Pittman signed with Al Sharjah of the UAE National Basketball League.

== Career statistics ==
Legend
GP	Games played	GS	Games started	MPG	Minutes per game
FG%	Field goal percentage	3P%	3-point field goal percentage	FT%	Free throw percentage
RPG	Rebounds per game	APG	Assists per game	SPG	Steals per game
BPG	Blocks per game	PPG	Points per game	**Bold**	Career high
†	Won an NBA championship

=== NBA ===
==== Regular season ====
Year	Team	GP	GS	MPG	FG%	3P%	FT%	RPG	APG	SPG	BPG	PPG
2010–11	Miami	2	0	5.5	.333	.000	.000	1.5	.0	.0	.0	1.0
2011–12†	Miami	**35**	**6**	**8.6**	.468	.000	**.643**	**2.0**	**.3**	**.2**	**.2**	**3.0**
2012–13	Miami	4	0	3.0	**.600**	.000	.000	1.8	.0	.0	.0	1.5
2012–13	Memphis	7	0	2.9	.167	.000	.000	.7	.0	.0	.0	.3
2013–14	Atlanta	2	0	1.5	.000	.000	.000	1.5	.0	.0	.0	.0
Career		50	6	6.9	.450	.000	.545	1.8	.2	.2	.2	2.3

==== Playoffs ====
Year	Team	GP	GS	MPG	FG%	3P%	FT%	RPG	APG	SPG	BPG	PPG
2012†	Miami	3	1	2.7	.000	.000	.000	.0	.3	.0	.3	.0
Career		3	1	2.7	.000	.000	.000	.0	.3	.0	.3	.0

=== NBA D-League ===
==== Regular season ====
Year	Team	GP	GS	MPG	FG%	3P%	FT%	RPG	APG	SPG	BPG	PPG
2010–11	Sioux Falls	22	**22**	**27.7**	.536	.000	.548	8.2	**1.2**	.4	1.7	**14.5**
2012–13	Sioux Falls	15	12	24.9	.470	.000	**.767**	**8.8**	.3	**.9**	1.7	12.4
2013–14	Austin	**28**	20	20.5	**.556**	.000	.705	6.8	.5	.5	**2.3**	11.3
Career		65	54	24.0	.527	.000	.652	7.7	.7	.6	1.9	12.6

=== CBA ===
==== Regular season ====
Year	Team	GP	GS	MPG	FG%	3P%	FT%	RPG	APG	SPG	BPG	PPG
2013–14	Foshan	7	0	18.7	.649	.000	.441	5.5	.4	.3	1.0	15.0
Career		7	0	18.7	.649	.000	.441	5.5	.4	.3	1.0	15.0

=== B.League ===
==== Regular season ====
Year	Team	GP	GS	MPG	FG%	3P%	FT%	RPG	APG	SPG	BPG	PPG
2016–17	Toyama	35	19	19.9	.538	.000	.600	7.8	.4	.3	1.1	12.9
2017–18	Toyama	57	13	17.8	.585	.000	.608	5.9	1.4	.5	.6	11.5
