= Annkathrin Kammeyer =

German politician (born 1990)

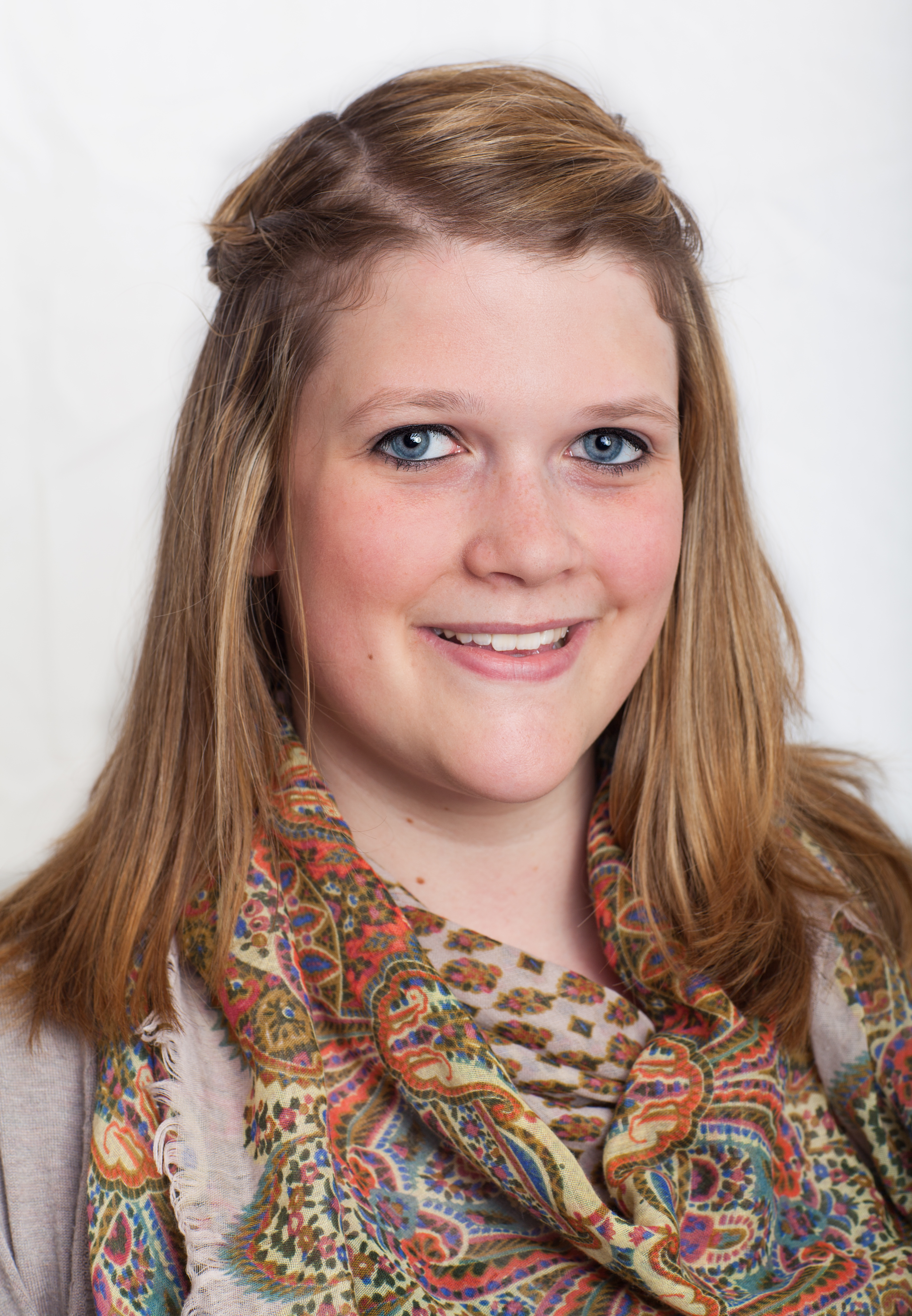
- Annkathrin Kammeyer in May 2012

Member of the Hamburg Parliament
- Incumbent
- Assumed office 7 March 2011

Personal details
- Born: 12 January 1990 (age 36) Horn, Hamburg, Germany
- Party: SPD
- Website: annkathrin-kammeyer.de

Annkathrin Kammeyer (born 12 January 1990) is a German Social Democratic politician and Member of the Hamburg Parliament since 7 March 2011.

== Life and work ==
Born in Horn, Hamburg, she was raised in a political family, Kammeyer had an early interest in politics. After her final exams at the Charlotte-Paulsen-Gymnasium in 2009, she started studying political science at the University of Hamburg.

== Political career ==
Kammeyer joined the SPD in 2006. She became the group leader of the Jusos (Young Socialists in the SPD) in Horn and deputy district chairman of the Jusos in Hamburg-Mitte.

From 2008 she worked in the office of Member of the Hamburg Parliament Michael Neumann. After her finals, she supported the Johannes Kahrs' campaign for the Bundestag. She also was active for AStA at the University of Hamburg.

Kammeyer ran as a candidate for the SPD in the 2011 Hamburg state election, in voting district 2 of Billstedt-Wilhelmsburg-Finkenwerder. She was elected, despite being only 46th on the SPD party list. On 7 March 2011, she became the youngest member of the Hamburg Parliament in history, at 21 years of age.
