= Chad Kammerer =

American basketball coach

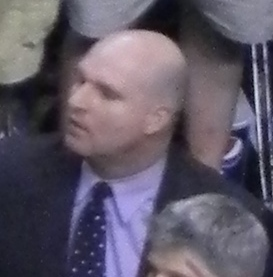
- Kammerer in 2012

Miami Heat
- Position: Director of Scouting
- League: NBA

Personal information
- Born: September 28, 1967 (age 58) Goshen, Indiana, U.S.

Career information
- College: Westmont (1987–1991)

Career history
- 2008–2013: Miami Heat (assistant)

Career highlights
- As assistant coach: 2× NBA champion (2012, 2013)

Chad Kammerer (born September 28, 1967) is director of scouting and a former assistant basketball coach of the National Basketball Association's Miami Heat. Kammerer joined the Heat in 2001 as an advance scout, became an assistant coach under Erik Spoelstra in 2008, and was part of the Miami Heat's 2012 NBA Finals Championship. Before joining the Heat, Kammerer worked as an assistant coach for Valparaiso University, the University of California at Los Angeles, Concordia University, and the University of Mississippi.

His father, Chet Kammerer, serves as the Miami Heat's Vice President of Player Personnel.

== Early life ==
Kammerer spent the early years of his childhood in Warsaw, Indiana, before moving to California. His father, Chet, was the head basketball coach at Grace College while the family lived in Warsaw. In 1975, the family moved to California, where Chet would become the head basketball coach at Westmont College. Years later, Chad Kammerer would become an all-conference college basketball player while attending Westmont College from 1986 to 1990. In 1993, Kammerer earned his master's degree from the University of Mississippi. The Westmont College basketball court was named Kammerer Court in 2008.

== Career ==
Kammerer joined the Miami Heat as a scout in August 2002 after just two months as an assistant coach for Valparaiso University. He also served as an assistant coach for UCLA, Concordia University Irvine, and Ole Miss.
