= Gerlinde Kämmerer =

German cultural scientist

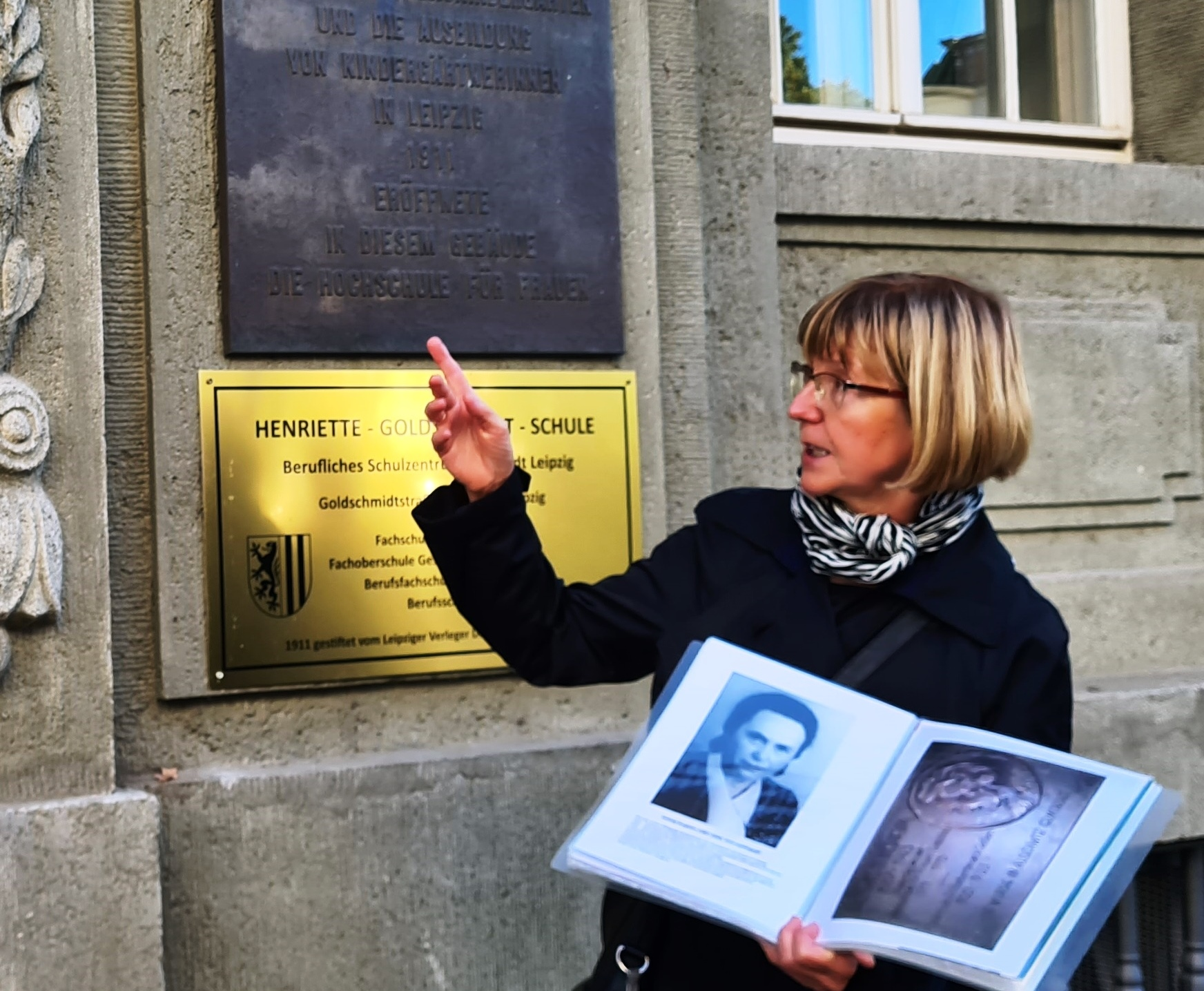
Gerlinde Kämmerer in front of the Henriette-Goldschmidt-Schule in Leipzig

Gerlinde Kämmerer (born 1955) is a German cultural scientist and certified tourist guide who specializes in research into Leipzig's women's history. Through her work, she contributes to raising awareness of the important role of women in the history of Leipzig and beyond.

== Life and work ==
Gerlinde Kämmerer has a degree in cultural studies and has been working intensively on women's history since 1992. She became particularly well known through her development of the first city tours on this topic in Leipzig. Since 1992 she has been active in the network "Miss Marple's Sisters" – Women's History on Location in Germany, Switzerland and Austria. In 1995, she published her book Leipziger Frauengeschichten. Ein historischer Stadtrundgang, followed by contributions in other publications, in the Digital German Women's Archive and in the Sächsische Biografie. Since 2005, Kämmerer has been co-editor of the publication series LOUISEum of the Louise-Otto-Peters-Gesellschaft e.V. .

Since 2013 Kämmerer has worked as an editor and author for the online portal Frauen machen Geschichte. Leipziger Frauenporträts, an online portal she designed for the Louise-Otto-Peters-Gesellschaft and the Department for Equality of the City of Leipzig. Since 2016, she has been a volunteer advisory board member of the frauenorte sachsen project of the State Women's Council of Saxony. She was a member of the board of the Louise-Otto-Peters-Gesellschaft from 2004 to 2014 and deputy chairwoman from 2014 to 2020. Since the end of 2020, she has been a member of the society's advisory board, which has been dedicated to promoting and honoring the life and work of Louise Otto-Peters since 1993.

Kämmerer's work has included research into Leipzig's women's history, which she presented in her city tours. As part of this work, she shows historical personalities, buildings and memorials in the city that were important for the German women's movement and the development of women's rights. These personalities include the writer and women's politician Louise Otto-Peters, the women's rights activist and Fröbel educator Henriette Goldschmidt, the pianist and composer Clara Schumann, the benefactress Apollonia von Wiedebach, the learned women Luise Adelgunde Victorie Gottsched and Ernestine Christine Reiske, the salonier Christiana Mariana von Ziegler, the composer Ethel Smyth and others. a. m. .
