= Emmanuel Christian School, Quebec =

Coordinates: 45°29′12″N 73°50′58″W

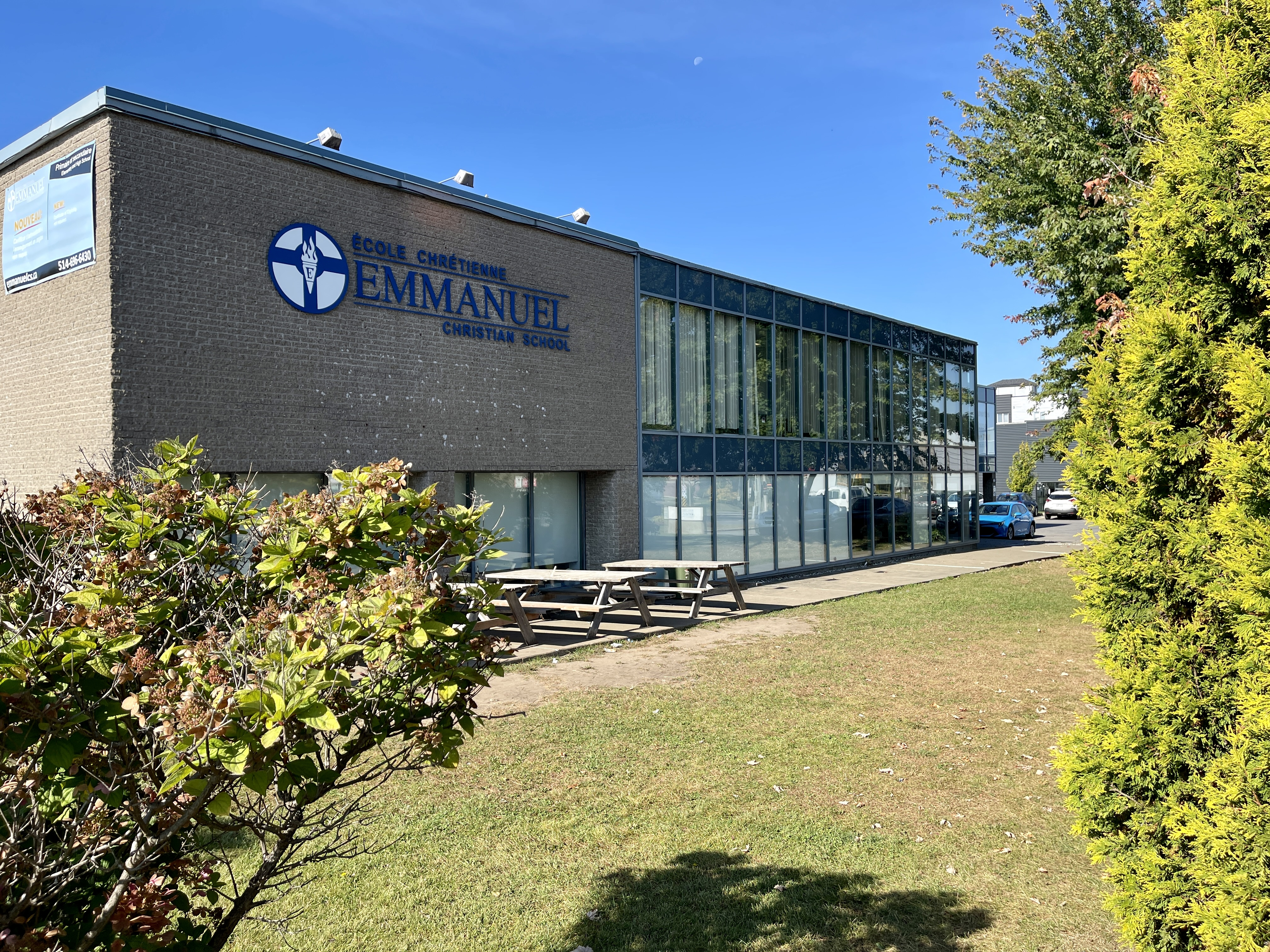
Emmanuel Christian School

Emmanuel Christian School (EMCS) is a Christian private elementary and high school located in Dollard-des-Ormeaux, Quebec. The school bases its educational and religious values primarily on Evangelical Protestant principles.

Emmanuel High School opened its doors to 38 students enrolled in Grades 7 and 8 in September 1975. The school was located in the former Surrey Gardens Elementary School, which belonged to the then Protestant School Board of Montreal. An additional grade was formed and admitted each consecutive year until the first year of graduates obtained their diplomas in 1979.

In September 1981, Kindergarten and Grades 1 and 2 classes became available, followed by Grades 3 and 4 in September 1982. Grades 5 and 6 were added in September 1983 until the complete school, from Kindergarten to Secondary 5 was formed.

In 1993, Emmanuel Christian School moved to the Boulevard St-Jean in Dollard-des-Ormeaux.

Fall 2025 marked the 50th anniversary of Emmanuel Christian School.
