= Cole Aldrich =

American basketball player (born 1988)

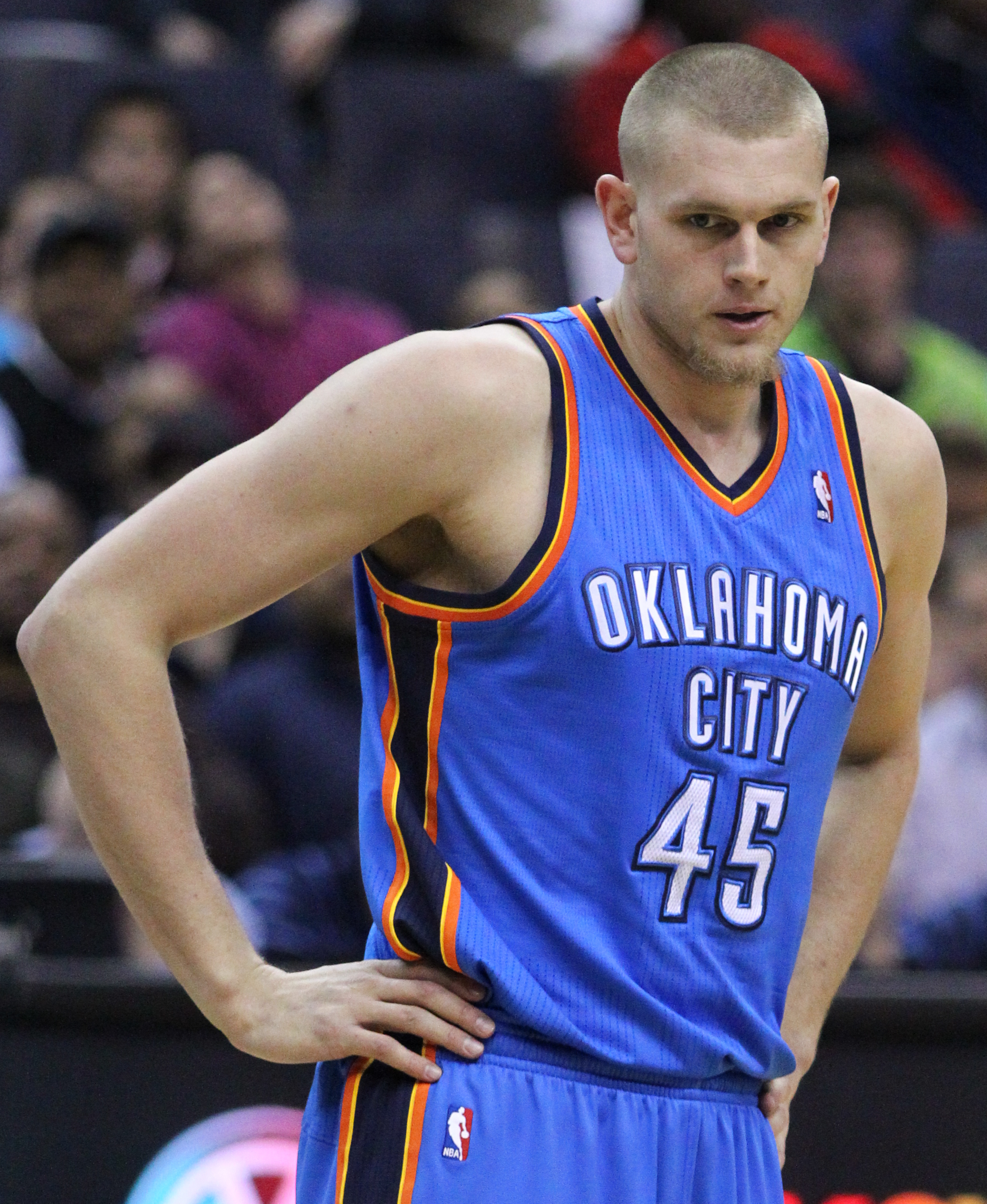
- Aldrich with the Oklahoma City Thunder in 2011

Personal information
- Born: October 31, 1988 (age 38) Burnsville, Minnesota, U.S.
- Listed height: 6 ft 11 in (2.11 m)
- Listed weight: 253 lb (115 kg)

Career information
- High school: Bloomington Jefferson (Bloomington, Minnesota)
- College: Kansas (2007–2010)
- NBA draft: 2010: 1st round, 11th overall pick
- Drafted by: New Orleans Hornets
- Playing career: 2010–2018
- Position: Center
- Number: 45, 31

Career history
- 2010–2012: Oklahoma City Thunder
- 2010–2011: →Tulsa 66ers
- 2012–2013: Houston Rockets
- 2013: Sacramento Kings
- 2013–2015: New York Knicks
- 2015–2016: Los Angeles Clippers
- 2016–2018: Minnesota Timberwolves
- 2018: Tianjin Gold Lions

Career highlights
- NCAA champion (2008); Consensus second-team All-American (2010); 2× Big 12 Defensive Player of the Year (2009, 2010); 2× First-team All-Big 12 (2009, 2010); 2× Big 12 All-Defensive Team (2009, 2010); No. 45 jersey retired by Kansas Jayhawks; Second-team Parade All-American (2007); McDonald's All-American (2007)

Career NBA statistics
- Points: 1,050 (3.1 ppg)
- Rebounds: 1,131 (3.3 rpg)
- Assists: 183 (0.5 apg)
- Stats at NBA.com
- Stats at Basketball Reference

Cole David Aldrich (born October 31, 1988) is an American former professional basketball player. He played in the National Basketball Association (NBA) for the Oklahoma City Thunder, Houston Rockets, Sacramento Kings, New York Knicks, Los Angeles Clippers and Minnesota Timberwolves. Aldrich played three seasons of college basketball for the Kansas Jayhawks before being drafted by the New Orleans Hornets with the 11th overall pick in the 2010 NBA draft.

== Early life ==
Aldrich was born on October 31, 1988, in Burnsville, Minnesota. His father was a steel metal worker and his mother worked in an embroidery. Aldrich attended Bloomington Jefferson High School in Bloomington, Minnesota. As a senior, he was named state player of the year by the St. Paul Pioneer Press and Minneapolis Star-Tribune.

Considered a four-star recruit by Rivals.com, Aldrich was listed as the No. 6 center and the No. 30 player in the nation in 2007.

== College career ==
=== Freshman season ===
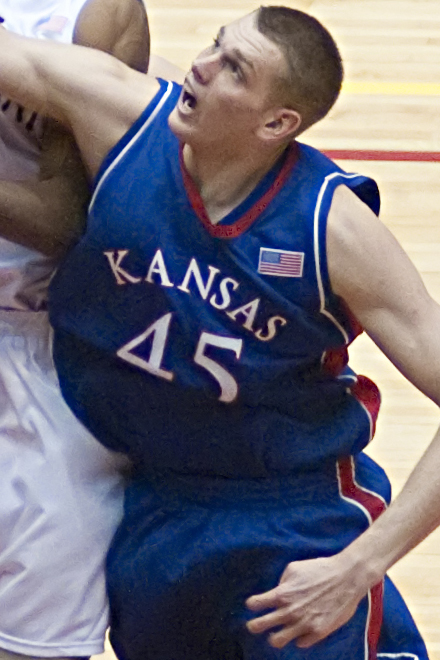
Cole Aldrich against Iowa State on January 24, 2009

During the 2007–08 season at Kansas, Aldrich's freshman season, his playing time was limited due to playing behind future NBA draft picks Darrell Arthur, Sasha Kaun, and Darnell Jackson. He averaged three rebounds and 2.8 points a game in 8.3 minutes a game during the regular season. Statistically, Aldrich's best performance was an 11-point, 11-rebound outing in a win over Texas Tech on March 3, 2008. Probably the most crucial game for Aldrich was during the Final Four game between Kansas and North Carolina on April 5, 2008, when he played only 16 minutes but managed to grab 8 rebounds and score 7 points along with blocking 4 shots while also playing effective defense against National Player of the Year Tyler Hansbrough, helping lead Kansas into the NCAA national championship game. They then defeated the Memphis Tigers to win their first Championship since 1988.

=== Sophomore season ===
With the departure of the other Jayhawk big men to the NBA draft, Aldrich became the premier big man going into his sophomore season. Through the first 29 games, he averaged a double-double with 15.1 points and 10.8 rebounds in 29.7 minutes of play. He grabbed a career-high 20 rebounds in an 87–78 win over Oklahoma on February 23, 2009. On March 8, 2009, Aldrich was named to the 2008–09 Big 12 All-conference first team.

On March 22, 2009, Aldrich recorded the first official triple-double in the history of Kansas basketball against Dayton in the second round of the NCAA tournament. Aldrich accumulated 13 points, 20 rebounds, and 10 blocks in a 60–43 victory, which was the second triple-double in NCAA history to include blocks, former LSU center Shaquille O'Neal recorded the other. On Monday, April 13, Aldrich announced that he would return to KU for his junior season.

=== Junior season ===
He won the 2009–10 men's college basketball Academic All-American of the Year as selected by CoSIDA and presented by ESPN the Magazine. He ended his college career a perfect 55–0 at Allen Fieldhouse.

== Professional career ==
=== Oklahoma City Thunder (2010–2012) ===
On March 29, 2010, Aldrich announced that he would forgo his final season of collegiate eligibility and enter the 2010 NBA draft. He was the 11th pick, selected by the New Orleans Hornets, who traded his rights on draft day to the Oklahoma City Thunder. On August 6, 2010, Aldrich signed a two-year contract with the Thunder with a two-year option.

On November 24, 2010, the Thunder assigned Aldrich to the Tulsa 66ers of the NBA D-League. He was recalled on December 6, 2010, but sent back to Tulsa on December 30, 2010. He was again recalled on February 2, 2011, and assigned for a third time on March 30, 2011. Aldrich reached the 2012 NBA Finals with the Thunder, but the team lost to the Miami Heat.

=== Houston Rockets (2012–2013) ===
In October 2012, Aldrich, James Harden, Daequan Cook, and Lazar Hayward were traded to the Houston Rockets for Kevin Martin, Jeremy Lamb, and draft picks.

=== Sacramento Kings (2013) ===
On February 20, 2013, Aldrich was traded to the Sacramento Kings along with Toney Douglas and Patrick Patterson in exchange for Francisco García, Thomas Robinson and Tyler Honeycutt.

=== New York Knicks (2013–2015) ===
On September 24, 2013, Aldrich signed with the New York Knicks. On January 29, 2014, he was assigned to the Erie BayHawks. He was recalled the next day. He went on to record his first double-double (12 points, 10 rebounds) in his first NBA start on March 12, 2014.

On July 11, 2014, Aldrich re-signed with the Knicks. On April 11, 2015, he scored a career-high 19 points in an 80–79 win over the Orlando Magic.

=== Los Angeles Clippers (2015–2016) ===
On July 13, 2015, Aldrich signed with the Los Angeles Clippers. On January 13, 2016, with starting center DeAndre Jordan out, Aldrich had a then season-best game with 19 points and 7 rebounds in a 104–90 win over the Miami Heat. On April 8, 2016, he recorded 21 points and 18 rebounds (both season highs) and a career-high five steals in a 102–99 overtime win over the Utah Jazz.

=== Minnesota Timberwolves (2016–2018) ===
On July 13, 2016, Aldrich signed a three-year, $22 million deal with his hometown team, the Minnesota Timberwolves.

On June 30, 2018, Aldrich was waived by the Timberwolves.

On September 18, 2018, Aldrich signed with the Atlanta Hawks but was waived by the Hawks on October 2, 2018, as their first training camp cut.

=== Tianjin Golden Lions (2018) ===
On October 10, 2018, Aldrich signed with the Tianjin Golden Lions of the Chinese Basketball Association. He sprained his knee while playing and returned home.

Aldrich planned to have a year-long break from basketball but made the decision to retire after his son was born and the COVID-19 pandemic occurred.

== NBA career statistics ==
Legend
| GP | Games played | GS | Games started | MPG | Minutes per game |
| FG% | Field goal percentage | 3P% | 3-point field goal percentage | FT% | Free throw percentage |
| RPG | Rebounds per game | APG | Assists per game | SPG | Steals per game |
| BPG | Blocks per game | PPG | Points per game | **Bold** | Career high |

=== Regular season ===
| Year | Team | GP | GS | MPG | FG% | 3P% | FT% | RPG | APG | SPG | BPG | PPG |
|---|---|---|---|---|---|---|---|---|---|---|---|---|
| 2010–11 | Oklahoma City | 18 | 0 | 7.9 | .533 | – | .500 | 1.9 | .2 | **.3** | .4 | 1.0 |
| 2011–12 | Oklahoma City | 26 | 0 | 6.7 | .524 | – | **.929** | 1.8 | .1 | **.3** | .6 | 2.2 |
| 2012–13 | Houston | 30 | 0 | 7.1 | .535 | – | .444 | 1.9 | .2 | .1 | .3 | 1.7 |
| 2012–13 | Sacramento | 15 | 0 | 11.7 | .568 | – | .727 | 4.2 | .2 | .1 | .9 | 3.3 |
| 2013–14 | New York | 46 | 2 | 7.2 | .541 | – | .867 | 2.8 | .3 | .2 | .7 | 2.0 |
| 2014–15 | New York | 61 | **16** | **16.0** | .478 | – | .781 | **5.5** | **1.2** | .6 | **1.1** | **5.5** |
| 2015–16 | L.A. Clippers | 60 | 5 | 13.3 | **.596** | – | .714 | 4.8 | .8 | **.8** | 1.1 | **5.5** |
| 2016–17 | Minnesota | **62** | 0 | 8.6 | .523 | – | .682 | 2.5 | .4 | .4 | .4 | 1.7 |
| 2017–18 | Minnesota | 21 | 0 | 2.3 | .333 | – | .333 | .7 | .1 | .1 | .0 | 0.6 |
| Career | | 339 | 23 | 10.0 | .527 | – | .738 | 3.3 | .5 | .4 | .7 | 3.1 |

=== Playoffs ===
| Year | Team | GP | GS | MPG | FG% | 3P% | FT% | RPG | APG | SPG | BPG | PPG |
|---|---|---|---|---|---|---|---|---|---|---|---|---|
| 2012 | Oklahoma City | 5 | 0 | 4.9 | .444 | – | **.500** | 2.6 | .0 | .0 | .0 | 2.0 |
| 2016 | L.A. Clippers | **6** | 0 | **12.8** | **.667** | – | **.500** | **5.0** | **.5** | **1.0** | **.5** | **3.8** |
| Career | | 11 | 0 | 9.2 | .583 | – | .500 | 3.9 | .3 | .5 | .3 | 3.0 |

== Personal life ==
Aldrich lives in Minnesota with his wife and son.

== See also ==
- 2010 NCAA Men's Basketball All-Americans
