= Daequan Cook =

American basketball player (born 1987)

Personal information
- Born: April 28, 1987 (age 39) Dayton, Ohio, U.S.
- Listed height: 6 ft 5 in (1.96 m)
- Listed weight: 210 lb (95 kg)

Career information
- High school: Dunbar (Dayton, Ohio)
- College: Ohio State (2006–2007)
- NBA draft: 2007: 1st round, 21st overall pick
- Drafted by: Philadelphia 76ers
- Playing career: 2007–2020
- Position: Shooting guard / small forward
- Number: 14

Career history
- 2007–2010: Miami Heat
- 2008: →Iowa Energy
- 2010–2012: Oklahoma City Thunder
- 2012–2013: Houston Rockets
- 2013: Chicago Bulls
- 2013–2014: Budivelnyk
- 2014: Walter Tigers Tübingen
- 2014–2015: SPO Rouen Basket
- 2015–2016: Benfica
- 2016–2017: Chemidor Tehran
- 2017–2020: Ironi Nes Ziona

Career highlights
- Israeli League All-Star (2019); NBA Three-Point Contest champion (2009); McDonald's All-American (2006); Third-team Parade All-American (2006)
- Stats at NBA.com
- Stats at Basketball Reference

Daequan Cook (born April 28, 1987) is an American former professional basketball player who last played for Ironi Nes Ziona of the Israeli Premier League. He was taken 21st overall in the 2007 NBA draft by the Philadelphia 76ers then subsequently traded to the Miami Heat.

== High school career ==
Daequan Cook attended Paul Laurence Dunbar High School in Dayton, Ohio. As a junior, he led Dunbar to the Ohio Division II state semifinals where they lost to eventual champion Upper Sandusky High School. As a senior, he averaged 24.9 points, 6.0 rebounds and 5.0 assists per game and led Dunbar to a Division II state championship. He was named onto the 2006 McDonald's All-American Team. Playing for the West, Cook scored 17 points in the 112–94 win. He was also named a third-team Parade All-American.

Cook was a high school teammate of Norris Cole. (The two later faced each other in the 2012 NBA Finals.) Cook also played with Mark Titus, Greg Oden and Mike Conley Jr. on the SPIECE Indy Heat high school AAU team. Cook was the team's leading scorer in the 2004 Big Time event in Las Vegas. The team was undefeated and won the championship.

== College career ==
One of Ohio State University Coach Thad Matta's famed "Thad Five", Cook averaged 10.7 points, 4.5 rebounds, 1.1 assists, and 0.7 steals in 20.4 minutes per game. On April 20, 2007, Cook announced his intentions to enter the 2007 NBA draft, along with fellow freshmen teammates Greg Oden and Mike Conley Jr.

== Professional career ==
=== NBA ===
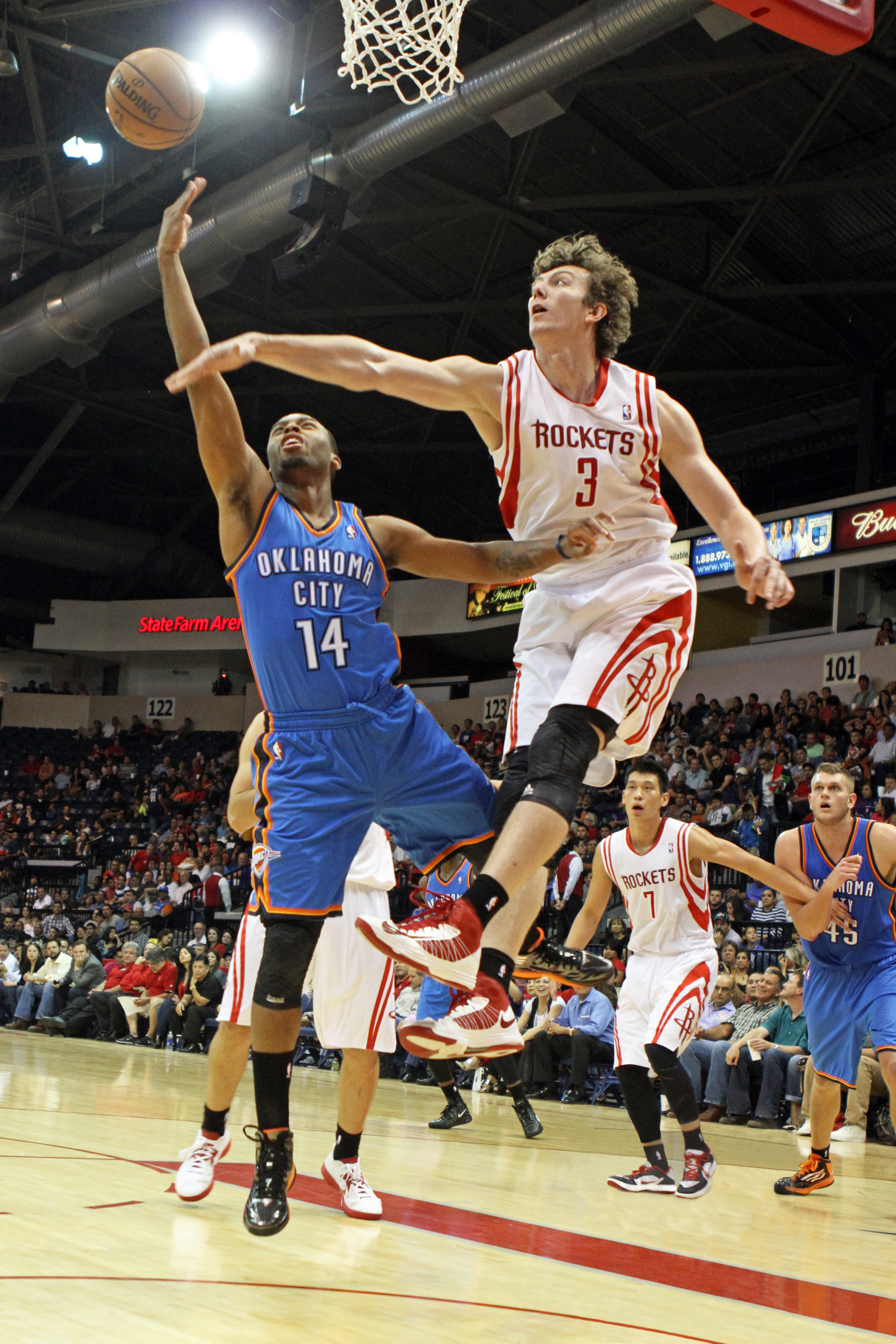
Cook in pre-season game versus Houston Rockets in 2012

==== Miami Heat (2007–2010) ====
Daequan Cook was averaging 8.2 points per game in his rookie season with the Miami Heat before being sent to the Iowa Energy of the NBA D-League in late February 2008. He returned to the Heat on March 8 and in his second game back on March 10 he scored a career-high 23 points in a one-point loss to the L.A. Clippers. He scored a new career-high of 27 against the Phoenix Suns on March 4, 2009, going 6–8 from 3-point range.

Cook won the 2009 NBA All-Star Weekend Three-Point Shootout in Phoenix, ending Jason Kapono's two-year winning streak.

==== Oklahoma City Thunder (2010–2012) ====
On June 23, 2010, Cook was traded with the 18th pick in the 2010 draft to the Oklahoma City Thunder for the 32nd pick in the 2010 Draft.

In 2010–2011, Cook emerged as a useful bench player for the Thunder, mostly as a three-point specialist. He was a key player in the Thunder's emergence as a Western Conference contender. In December 2011, Cook signed a two-year extension with the Thunder. Cook reached the 2012 NBA Finals with the Thunder, but the team lost to the Miami Heat.

==== Houston Rockets (2012–2013) ====
On October 27, 2012, Cook, James Harden, Cole Aldrich, and Lazar Hayward were traded to the Houston Rockets for Kevin Martin, Jeremy Lamb, and draft picks. Cook was waived by the Rockets on January 2, 2013.

==== Chicago Bulls (2013) ====
On January 6, 2013, Cook signed with the Chicago Bulls, and played there for the remainder of the season.

=== Overseas ===
==== Budivelnyk / Tübingen (2013–2014) ====
On November 23, 2013, Cook has signed his first overseas contract, with Ukrainian SuperLeague team Budivelnyk Kyiv, which also participating in the Euroleague. In his Euroleague debut, Cook scored 16 points with 4/8 from 3-point range in his team loss 74–82 to CSKA Moscow. Budivelnyk waived him on January 14, 2014. On January 29, 2014, he signed with Walter Tigers Tübingen of Germany for the rest of the 2013–14 season.

==== SPO Rouen (2014–2015) ====
On August 12, 2014, Cook signed with SPO Rouen Basket of the French LNB Pro A for the 2014–15 season.

==== Benfica (2015–2016) ====
On August 14, 2015, Cook signed with Portuguese champions S.L. Benfica of the Liga Portuguesa de Basquetebol. On March 13, 2016, Cook recorded a career-high 44 points, while shooting 15-of-32 from the field, along with nine rebounds and three assists in a 94–97 loss to Porto.

==== Chemidor Tehran (2016–2017) ====
In December 2016, Cook signed with Chemidor Tehran of the Iranian Super League.

==== Ironi Nes Ziona (2017–2020) ====
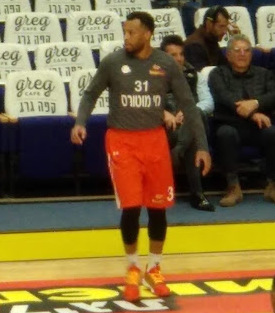
Cook with Ironi Nes Ziona in March 2019

On August 9, 2017, Cook signed with the Israeli team Ironi Nes Ziona for the 2017–18 season. In 32 games played during the 2017–18 season, he led the team in scoring by averaging 16 points per game. Cook led Nes Ziona to the 2018 Israeli League Playoffs, where they eventually lost to Maccabi Tel Aviv in the Quarterfinals.

On June 7, 2018, Cook signed a one-year contract extension with Nes Ziona. On December 9, 2018, Cook recorded 24 points, shooting 5-of-8 from three-point range, including a game-winning three-point shot with 2.9 seconds left to give Nes Ziona an 83–81 win over Maccabi Tel Aviv. He was subsequently named Israeli League Round 9 MVP. On April 7, 2019, Cook recorded a season-high 30 points, shooting 7-of-11 from three-point range, along with three assists, leading Nes Ziona to a 97–84 win over Hapoel Holon. He was subsequently named Israeli League Round 25 MVP.

On August 1, 2019, Cook signed a one-year contract extension with Nes Ziona. On December 1, 2019, Cook recorded a season-high 34 points, while shooting 13-of-24 from the field, along with seven rebounds and two assists in a 106–115 double overtime loss to Hapoel Gilboa Galil.

On August 24, 2020, Cook signed with Hapoel Tel Aviv. However, his contract was voided on September 6 and the team replaced him with Jon Diebler.

== NBA career statistics ==
Legend
GP	Games played	GS	Games started	MPG	Minutes per game
FG%	Field goal percentage	3P%	3-point field goal percentage	FT%	Free throw percentage
RPG	Rebounds per game	APG	Assists per game	SPG	Steals per game
BPG	Blocks per game	PPG	Points per game	**Bold**	Career high

=== Regular season ===
Year	Team	GP	GS	MPG	FG%	3P%	FT%	RPG	APG	SPG	BPG	PPG
2007–08	Miami	59	19	**24.4**	.381	.332	.825	**3.0**	**1.3**	.4	**.2**	8.8
2008–09	Miami	**75**	4	**24.4**	.375	.387	**.875**	2.5	.9	**.5**	.1	**9.1**
2009–10	Miami	45	3	15.4	.320	.317	.840	1.8	1.0	.3	**.2**	5.0
2010–11	Oklahoma City	43	0	13.9	**.436**	**.422**	.800	1.7	.5	.3	.0	5.6
2011–12	Oklahoma City	57	**22**	17.4	.368	.346	.636	2.1	.3	.4	**.2**	5.5
2012–13	Houston	16	1	10.3	.356	.367	.667	1.1	.6	.4	.1	3.4
2012–13	Chicago	33	0	8.4	.278	.246	.778	1.3	.3	.1	**.2**	2.5
Career		328	49	18.3	.369	.359	.813	2.1	.7	.4	.1	6.4

=== Playoffs ===
Year	Team	GP	GS	MPG	FG%	3P%	FT%	RPG	APG	SPG	BPG	PPG
2009	Miami	7	0	**23.0**	.310	.300	**1.000**	**2.4**	.6	**.3**	.0	**5.3**
2011	Oklahoma City	**17**	0	11.5	**.393**	**.348**	**1.000**	1.6	.1	.2	.0	3.8
2012	Oklahoma City	16	0	6.8	.378	.333	.000	.6	.3	.2	.0	2.3
2013	Chicago	6	0	6.0	.100	.125	.000	.5	**.7**	.2	.0	.5
Career		46	0	10.9	.345	.315	.750	1.2	.3	.2	.0	3.0

== See also ==
- 2006 high school boys basketball All-Americans
