= 2011–12 Oklahoma City Thunder season =

NBA professional basketball team season

- Conference champions
- Division champions
- Head coach: Scott Brooks
- General manager: Sam Presti
- Owners: Professional Basketball Club LLC
- Arena: Chesapeake Energy Arena

Results
- Record: 47–19 (.712)
- Place: Division: 1st (Northwest); Conference: 2nd (Western)
- Playoff finish: NBA Finals (lost to Heat 1–4)
- Stats at Basketball Reference

Local media
- Television: Fox Sports Oklahoma
- Radio: KWPN; WWLS-FM

The 2011–12 Oklahoma City Thunder season was the 4th season of the franchise's existence in Oklahoma City as a member of the National Basketball Association (NBA).

The Thunder continued to build on recent success in previous years by making the NBA Playoffs, first defeating and sweeping the defending NBA champions, the Dallas Mavericks, in four games in the First Round, then defeated the Los Angeles Lakers in five games in the Semi-finals, and finally, defeated the San Antonio Spurs in six games in the Western Conference finals to advance to the NBA Finals for the first time since 1996, when the club was based in Seattle.

In the NBA Finals, the Thunder faced off against the Big Three-led Miami Heat, who made an appearance in the previous NBA Finals, but lost to the Dallas Mavericks in six games. Despite winning Game 1 in the NBA Finals, the Thunder would then go on to lose the next four games and the NBA Finals against the Heat. They did not return to the NBA Finals until 2025.

Other season highlights included forward Kevin Durant's third consecutive NBA scoring title, and Durant being named the MVP of the All-Star Game. Following the season, James Harden was traded to the Houston Rockets.

== Offseason ==
=== Draft picks ===
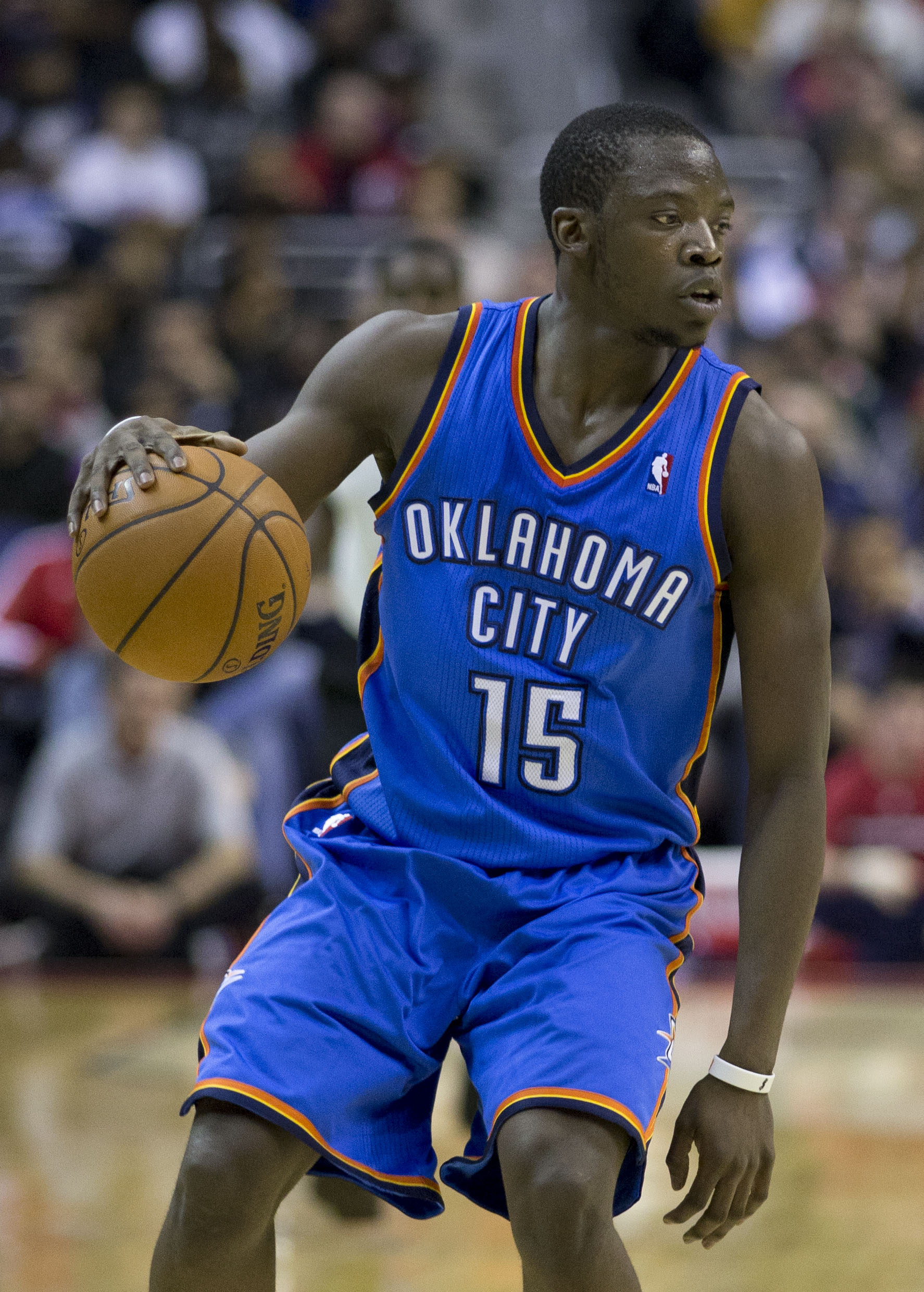
Reggie Jackson was selected 24th overall by the Oklahoma City Thunder.

Round	Pick	Player	Position	Nationality	College
1	24	Reggie Jackson	PG	United States	Boston College

The Thunder had only their own first-round pick entering the draft. The Thunder traded their 2011 second-round pick in the Latavious Williams trade with the Miami Heat back in 2010. The Thunder ended 2011 NBA draft night with Boston College guard Reggie Jackson.

=== Trades ===
On December 13, the Thunder traded Robert Vaden, a 2012 second-round pick and a 2013 second-round pick to the Minnesota Timberwolves in exchange for Lazar Hayward. Presti said on Hayward that his "toughness, length, and shooting are attributes that will add depth to our roster."

On December 19, the Thunder traded Byron Mullens to the Charlotte Bobcats in exchange for a 2013 second-round pick. Mullens only played in 26 games over two seasons being stuck behind Kendrick Perkins, Nazr Mohammed and Cole Aldrich.

=== Free agency ===
For this offseason, free agency began on December 9, 2011, due to the 2011 NBA lockout. Daequan Cook was set to hit restricted free agency. On December 9, Cook agreed to a two-year, $6.5 million deal to re-sign with the Thunder. On December 13, Ryan Reid signed a deal with the Thunder. Reid was originally selected 57th overall in the 2010 NBA draft but did not a sign a contract in the 2010–11 season, instead playing the season with the Tulsa 66ers.

On December 24, the Thunder waived Nate Robinson. Robinson opted to stay in his hometown Seattle after spending most of his Thunder tenure on the bench.

== Roster ==
2011–12 Oklahoma City Thunder roster
Players

Pos.	No.	Player	Height	Weight	DOB	From
C	45	Cole Aldrich	6 ft 11 in (2.11 m)	245 lb (111 kg)	1988-10-31	Kansas
PF	4	Nick Collison	6 ft 10 in (2.08 m)	255 lb (116 kg)	1980-10-26	Kansas
SG	14	Daequan Cook	6 ft 5 in (1.96 m)	210 lb (95 kg)	1987-04-28	Ohio State
SF	35	Kevin Durant	6 ft 9 in (2.06 m)	230 lb (104 kg)	1988-09-29	Texas
PG	37	Derek Fisher	6 ft 1 in (1.85 m)	210 lb (95 kg)	1974-08-09	Little Rock
SG	13	James Harden	6 ft 5 in (1.96 m)	220 lb (100 kg)	1989-08-26	Arizona State
SF	11	Lazar Hayward	6 ft 6 in (1.98 m)	225 lb (102 kg)	1986-11-26	Marquette
PF	9	Serge Ibaka	6 ft 10 in (2.08 m)	235 lb (107 kg)	1989-09-18	Spain
SG	7	Royal Ivey	6 ft 4 in (1.93 m)	215 lb (98 kg)	1981-12-20	Texas
PG	15	Reggie Jackson	6 ft 3 in (1.91 m)	208 lb (94 kg)	1990-04-16	Boston College
PG	6	Eric Maynor	6 ft 3 in (1.91 m)	175 lb (79 kg)	1987-06-11	VCU
C	8	Nazr Mohammed	6 ft 10 in (2.08 m)	250 lb (113 kg)	1977-09-05	Kentucky
C	5	Kendrick Perkins	6 ft 10 in (2.08 m)	267 lb (121 kg)	1984-11-10	Clifton J. Ozen HS (TX)
SG	2	Thabo Sefolosha	6 ft 7 in (2.01 m)	215 lb (98 kg)	1984-05-02	Switzerland
PG	0	Russell Westbrook	6 ft 3 in (1.91 m)	187 lb (85 kg)	1988-11-12	UCLA

Coaches
Head coach
- Scott Brooks
Assistant(s)
- Mark Bryant
- Maurice Cheeks
- Rex Kalamian
- Brian Keefe
- Maz Trakh (player development)

Legend
- (DP) Unsigned draft pick
- (FA) Free agent
- (S) Suspended
- (DL) On assignment to D-League affiliate
- Injured

Roster
Updated: March 25, 2012

== Standings ==
=== Conference ===
Western Conference
#	Team	W	L	PCT	GB	GP
1	c-San Antonio Spurs *	50	16	.758	–	66
2	y-Oklahoma City Thunder *	47	19	.712	3.0	66
3	y-Los Angeles Lakers *	41	25	.621	9.0	66
4	x-Memphis Grizzlies	41	25	.621	9.0	66
5	x-Los Angeles Clippers	40	26	.606	10.0	66
6	x-Denver Nuggets	38	28	.576	12.0	66
7	x-Dallas Mavericks	36	30	.545	14.0	66
8	x-Utah Jazz	36	30	.545	14.0	66
9	Houston Rockets	34	32	.515	16.0	66
10	Phoenix Suns	33	33	.500	17.0	66
11	Portland Trail Blazers	28	38	.424	22.0	66
12	Minnesota Timberwolves	26	40	.394	24.0	66
13	Golden State Warriors	23	43	.348	27.0	66
14	Sacramento Kings	22	44	.333	28.0	66
15	New Orleans Hornets	21	45	.318	29.0	66

=== Division ===
Northwest Division	W	L	PCT	GB	Home	Road	Div	GP
y-Oklahoma City Thunder	47	19	.712	–	26‍–‍7	21‍–‍12	10–3	66
x-Denver Nuggets	38	28	.576	9.0	20‍–‍13	18‍–‍15	6–7	66
x-Utah Jazz	36	30	.545	11.0	25‍–‍8	11‍–‍22	9–4	66
Portland Trail Blazers	28	38	.424	19.0	20‍–‍13	8‍–‍25	4–10	66
Minnesota Timberwolves	26	40	.394	21.0	13‍–‍20	13‍–‍20	4–9	66

== Game log ==
=== Preseason ===
2011 pre-season game log
Pre-season: 2–0 (home: 1–0; road: 1–0)

Game	Date	Team	Score	High points	High rebounds	High assists	Location Attendance	Record
1	December 18	@ Dallas	W 106–92	Kevin Durant (21)	Kendrick Perkins (8)	Russell Westbrook (4)	American Airlines Center	1–0
2	December 20	Dallas	W 87–83	James Harden (13)	Kendrick Perkins; James Harden (8)	James Harden (5)	Chesapeake Energy Arena	2–0

2011–12 season schedule

=== Regular season ===
2011–12 game log
Total: 47–19 (home: 26–7; road: 21–12)
December: 5–0 (home: 3–0; road: 2–0)

Game	Date	Team	Score	High points	High rebounds	High assists	Location Attendance	Record
1	December 25	Orlando	W 97–89	Kevin Durant (30)	Russell Westbrook; Nazr Mohammed (7)	Kevin Durant; Russell Westbrook (6)	Chesapeake Energy Arena; 18,203	1–0
2	December 26	@ Minnesota	W 104–100	Kevin Durant (33)	Kendrick Perkins (8)	Russell Westbrook (6)	Target Center; 19,406	2–0
3	December 28	@ Memphis	W 98–95	Kevin Durant (32)	Kevin Durant (8)	Russell Westbrook (6)	FedExForum; 18,119	3–0
4	December 29	Dallas	W 104–102	Kevin Durant (30)	Kevin Durant (11)	Kevin Durant (6)	Chesapeake Energy Arena; 18,203	4–0
5	December 31	Phoenix	W 107–97	Russell Westbrook (18)	Kendrick Perkins (8)	James Harden (8)	Chesapeake Energy Arena; 18,203	5–0

January: 11–4 (home: 5–1; road: 6–3)

Game	Date	Team	Score	High points	High rebounds	High assists	Location Attendance	Record
6	January 2	@ Dallas	L 87–100	Kevin Durant (27)	Serge Ibaka; Russell Westbrook (8)	Russell Westbrook; James Harden (3)	American Airlines Center; 20,108	5–1
7	January 3	Portland	L 93–103	James Harden (23)	Nick Collison (6)	Russell Westbrook (8)	Chesapeake Energy Arena; 18,203	5–2
8	January 6	Houston	W 109–94	Kevin Durant (26)	Serge Ibaka (9)	Russell Westbrook (5)	Chesapeake Energy Arena; 18,203	6–2
9	January 7	@ Houston	W 98–95	Kevin Durant (27)	Kendrick Perkins (9)	Russell Westbrook (6)	Toyota Center; 14,327	7–2
10	January 8	San Antonio	W 108–96	Kevin Durant (21)	Nick Collison; Kevin Durant (10)	Kevin Durant (7)	Chesapeake Energy Arena; 18,203	8–2
11	January 10	@ Memphis	W 100–95	Russell Westbrook (30)	Kendrick Perkins (13)	Kevin Durant (5)	FedExForum; 13,601	9–2
12	January 11	@ New Orleans	W 95–85	Kevin Durant (29)	Kevin Durant (10)	Russell Westbrook (7)	New Orleans Arena; 13,565	10–2
13	January 14	New York	W 104–92	Kevin Durant (28)	Russell Westbrook (8)	Russell Westbrook (8)	Chesapeake Energy Arena; 18,203	11–2
14	January 16	@ Boston	W 97–88	Kevin Durant (28)	Kevin Durant; Russell Westbrook (7)	Kevin Durant; Russell Westbrook (4)	TD Garden; 18,624	12–2
15	January 18	@ Washington	L 102–105	Russell Westbrook (36)	Serge Ibaka (10)	Russell Westbrook (7)	Verizon Center; 15,075	12–3
16	January 21	@ New Jersey	W 84–74	Russell Westbrook (21)	Kevin Durant (15)	Russell Westbrook (6)	Prudential Center; 15,201	13–3
17	January 23	Detroit	W 99–79	Russell Westbrook; James Harden (24)	Serge Ibaka (10)	Russell Westbrook (6)	Chesapeake Energy Arena; 18,203	14–3
18	January 25	New Orleans	W 101–91	Kevin Durant (25)	Kevin Durant; Serge Ibaka (7)	James Harden (6)	Chesapeake Energy Arena; 18,203	15–3
19	January 27	@ Golden State	W 120–109	Kevin Durant (37)	Kevin Durant (13)	Russell Westbrook (11)	Oracle Arena; 19,596	16–3
20	January 30	@ L. A. Clippers	L 100–112	Kevin Durant (36)	Kevin Durant (13)	James Harden (5)	Staples Center; 19,404	16–4

February: 12–3 (home: 7–0; road: 5–3)

Game	Date	Team	Score	High points	High rebounds	High assists	Location Attendance	Record
21	February 1	@ Dallas	W 95–86	Russell Westbrook (33)	Kevin Durant (13)	James Harden (9)	American Airlines Center; 20,316	17–4
22	February 3	Memphis	W 101–94	Kevin Durant (36)	Kevin Durant (10)	Russell Westbrook (7)	Chesapeake Energy Arena; 18,203	18–4
23	February 4	@ San Antonio	L 96–107	Kevin Durant (22)	Kevin Durant (11)	Russell Westbrook (6)	AT&T Center; 18,581	18–5
24	February 6	@ Portland	W 111–107	Kevin Durant (33)	Serge Ibaka (13)	Russell Westbrook (8)	Rose Garden; 20,559	19–5
25	February 7	@ Golden State	W 119–116	Kevin Durant (33)	Kevin Durant (10)	Kevin Durant; Russell Westbrook; James Harden (7)	Oracle Arena; 17,971	20–5
26	February 9	@ Sacramento	L 101–106	Kevin Durant (27)	Serge Ibaka (9)	Kevin Durant; Russell Westbrook; James Harden; Nick Collison (3)	Power Balance Pavilion; 17,317	20–6
27	February 10	@ Utah	W 101–87	Russell Westbrook (28)	Serge Ibaka (11)	Russell Westbrook (3)	EnergySolutions Arena; 19,911	21–6
28	February 14	Utah	W 111–85	James Harden (22)	Serge Ibaka (10)	Reggie Jackson (8)	Chesapeake Energy Arena; 18,203	22–6
29	February 15	@ Houston	L 95–96	Kevin Durant (33)	Kevin Durant; Russell Westbrook (8)	Russell Westbrook; James Harden (4)	Toyota Center; 18,274	22–7
30	February 17	Golden State	W 110–87	James Harden (25)	Kevin Durant (10)	Kevin Durant (6)	Chesapeake Energy Arena; 18,203	23–7
31	February 19	Denver	W 124–118	Kevin Durant (51)	Serge Ibaka (15)	Russell Westbrook (9)	Chesapeake Energy Arena; 18,203	24–7
32	February 20	New Orleans	W 101–93	Kevin Durant; Russell Westbrook (31)	Kendrick Perkins (10)	Kevin Durant; Russell Westbrook; Reggie Jackson (4)	Chesapeake Energy Arena; 18,203	25–7
33	February 22	Boston	W 119–104	Russell Westbrook (31)	Kendrick Perkins (10)	James Harden (7)	Chesapeake Energy Arena; 18,203	26–7
34	February 23	L. A. Lakers	W 100–85	Kevin Durant (33)	Serge Ibaka (13)	Kevin Durant; Russell Westbrook (6)	Chesapeake Energy Arena; 18,203	27–7
All-Star Break
35	February 29	@ Philadelphia	W 92–88	Kevin Durant (23)	Russell Westbrook (13)	Russell Westbrook; James Harden (4)	Wells Fargo Center; 19,746	28–7

March: 11–5 (home: 7–3; road: 4–2)

Game	Date	Team	Score	High points	High rebounds	High assists	Location Attendance	Record
36	March 1	@ Orlando	W 105–102	Kevin Durant (38)	Kendrick Perkins (11)	Russell Westbrook (10)	Amway Center; 18,846	29–7
37	March 3	@ Atlanta	L 90–97	Kevin Durant (35)	Kevin Durant (8)	Russell Westbrook (4)	Philips Arena; 18,087	29–8
38	March 5	Dallas	W 95–91	Russell Westbrook (24)	Kendrick Perkins (14)	James Harden (4)	Chesapeake Energy Arena; 18,203	30–8
39	March 7	Phoenix	W 115–104	Russell Westbrook (31)	Serge Ibaka (20)	Russell Westbrook (10)	Chesapeake Energy Arena; 18,203	31–8
40	March 9	Cleveland	L 90–96	Kevin Durant (23)	Kevin Durant (8)	Kevin Durant (8)	Chesapeake Energy Arena; 18,203	31–9
41	March 10	Charlotte	W 122–95	James Harden (33)	Kevin Durant (7)	Reggie Jackson (7)	Chesapeake Energy Arena; 18,203	32–9
42	March 13	Houston	L 103–104	Kevin Durant (28)	Kevin Durant (12)	James Harden (7)	Chesapeake Energy Arena; 18,203	32–10
43	March 15	@ Denver	W 103–90	Kevin Durant (24)	Kevin Durant (8)	Russell Westbrook (5)	Pepsi Center; 18,458	33–10
44	March 16	San Antonio	L 105–114	Russell Westbrook (36)	Serge Ibaka (12)	Russell Westbrook (6)	Chesapeake Energy Arena; 18,203	33–11
45	March 18	Portland	W 111–95	Russell Westbrook (28)	Serge Ibaka (8)	James Harden (7)	Chesapeake Energy Arena; 18,203	34–11
46	March 20	@ Utah	L 90–97	Russell Westbrook (23)	Serge Ibaka (10)	Russell Westbrook (3)	EnergySolutions Arena; 18,138	34–12
47	March 21	L. A. Clippers	W 114–91	Kevin Durant (32)	Kevin Durant (9)	Kevin Durant; James Harden (5)	Chesapeake Energy Arena; 18,203	35–12
48	March 23	Minnesota	W 149–140 (2OT)	Russell Westbrook (45)	Kevin Durant (17)	James Harden; Russell Westbrook (6)	Chesapeake Energy Arena; 18,203	36–12
49	March 25	Miami	W 103–87	Kevin Durant (28)	Serge Ibaka (10)	Kevin Durant (8)	Chesapeake Energy Arena; 18,203	37–12
50	March 27	@ Portland	W 109–95	Russell Westbrook (32)	Serge Ibaka (12)	Russell Westbrook (8)	Rose Garden; 20,626	38–12
51	March 29	@ L. A. Lakers	W 102–93	Russell Westbrook (36)	Kevin Durant (11)	Russell Westbrook (6)	Staples Center; 18,997	39–12

April : 8–7 (home: 4–3; road: 4–4)

Game	Date	Team	Score	High points	High rebounds	High assists	Location Attendance	Record
52	April 1	Chicago	W 92–78	Russell Westbrook (27)	Kevin Durant (10)	Russell Westbrook (5)	Chesapeake Energy Arena; 18,203	40–12
53	April 2	Memphis	L 88–94	Kevin Durant (21)	Kendrick Perkins (11)	James Harden (5)	Chesapeake Energy Arena; 18,203	40–13
54	April 4	@ Miami	L 93–98	Kevin Durant (30)	Serge Ibaka; Kendrick Perkins; Nick Collison (7)	James Harden (5)	American Airlines Arena; 20,104	40–14
55	April 6	@ Indiana	L 98–103	Kevin Durant (44)	Russell Westbrook (11)	Russell Westbrook (9)	Bankers Life Fieldhouse; 18,165	40–15
56	April 8	Toronto	W 91–75	Kevin Durant (23)	Nick Collison (9)	Russell Westbrook (6)	Chesapeake Energy Arena; 18,203	41–15
57	April 9	@ Milwaukee	W 109–89	Russell Westbrook (26)	Kendrick Perkins; Russell Westbrook; Nick Collison (7)	Kevin Durant (8)	Bradley Center; 14,111	42–15
58	April 11	L. A. Clippers	L 98–100	Kevin Durant (22)	Kevin Durant (9)	Russell Westbrook (7)	Chesapeake Energy Arena; 18,203	42–16
59	April 13	Sacramento	W 115–89	Kevin Durant (29)	Kendrick Perkins (11)	Russell Westbrook (5)	Chesapeake Energy Arena; 18,203	43–16
60	April 14	@ Minnesota	W 115–110	Kevin Durant (43)	Serge Ibaka (12)	Russell Westbrook (8)	Target Center; 19,552	44–16
61	April 16	@ L. A. Clippers	L 77–92	Kevin Durant (24)	Kendrick Perkins (9)	James Harden; Russell Westbrook (3)	Staples Center; 19,516	44–17
62	April 18	@ Phoenix	W 109–97	James Harden (40)	Kevin Durant (11)	Kevin Durant; Russell Westbrook (5)	US Airways Center; 14,873	45–17
63	April 20	@ Sacramento	W 103–92	Kevin Durant (29)	Kevin Durant (14)	Kevin Durant (7)	Power Balance Pavilion; 16,882	46–17
64	April 22	@ L. A. Lakers	L 106–114 (2OT)	Kevin Durant (35)	Serge Ibaka (14)	Russell Westbrook (10)	Staples Center; 18,997	46–18
65	April 24	Sacramento	W 118–110	Kevin Durant (32)	Kevin Durant (9)	Russell Westbrook (6)	Chesapeake Energy Arena; 18,203	47–18
66	April 25	Denver	L 101–106	Kevin Durant (32)	Kendrick Perkins; Russell Westbrook (6)	Russell Westbrook (9)	Chesapeake Energy Arena; 18,203	47–19

2011–12 season schedule

=== Playoffs ===
2012 playoff game log
First round: 4–0 (home: 2–0; road: 2–0)

Game	Date	Team	Score	High points	High rebounds	High assists	Location Attendance	Series
1	April 28	Dallas	W 99–98	Russell Westbrook (28)	Kendrick Perkins (8)	Russell Westbrook (5)	Chesapeake Energy Arena; 18,203	1–0
2	April 30	Dallas	W 102–99	Russell Westbrook (29)	Kevin Durant (10)	James Harden (5)	Chesapeake Energy Arena; 18,203	2–0
3	May 3	@ Dallas	W 95–79	Kevin Durant (31)	Serge Ibaka (11)	Kevin Durant (6)	American Airlines Center; 20,640	3–0
4	May 5	@ Dallas	W 103–97	James Harden (29)	Kevin Durant (11)	Russell Westbrook (6)	American Airlines Center; 20,533	4–0

Conference Semi-finals: 4–1 (home: 3–0; road: 1–1)

Game	Date	Team	Score	High points	High rebounds	High assists	Location Attendance	Series
1	May 14	L. A. Lakers	W 119–90	Russell Westbrook (27)	Kevin Durant (8)	Russell Westbrook (9)	Chesapeake Energy Arena; 18,203	1–0
2	May 16	L. A. Lakers	W 77–75	Kevin Durant (22)	Kevin Durant (7)	Kevin Durant (5)	Chesapeake Energy Arena; 18,203	2–0
3	May 18	@ L. A. Lakers	L 96–99	Kevin Durant (31)	Serge Ibaka (11)	Thabo Sefolosha (4)	Staples Center; 18,997	2–1
4	May 19	@ L. A. Lakers	W 103–100	Russell Westbrook (37)	Kevin Durant (13)	Russell Westbrook (5)	Staples Center; 18,997	3–1
5	May 21	L. A. Lakers	W 106–90	Russell Westbrook (28)	Kendrick Perkins (11)	Kevin Durant; Russell Westbrook; James Harden (4)	Chesapeake Energy Arena; 18,203	4–1

Conference finals: 4–2 (home: 3–0; road: 1–2)

Game	Date	Team	Score	High points	High rebounds	High assists	Location Attendance	Series
1	May 27	@ San Antonio	L 98–101	Kevin Durant (27)	Kevin Durant (10)	Russell Westbrook (5)	AT&T Center; 18,581	0–1
2	May 29	@ San Antonio	L 111–120	Kevin Durant (31)	Serge Ibaka (10)	Russell Westbrook (8)	AT&T Center; 18,581	0–2
3	May 31	San Antonio	W 102–82	Kevin Durant (22)	Kendrick Perkins (8)	Russell Westbrook (9)	Chesapeake Energy Arena; 18,203	1–2
4	June 2	San Antonio	W 109–103	Kevin Durant (36)	Kendrick Perkins (9)	Kevin Durant (8)	Chesapeake Energy Arena; 18,203	2–2
5	June 4	@ San Antonio	W 108–103	Kevin Durant (27)	Kendrick Perkins (10)	Russell Westbrook (12)	AT&T Center; 18,581	3–2
6	June 6	San Antonio	W 107–99	Kevin Durant (34)	Kevin Durant (14)	Kevin Durant; Russell Westbrook (5)	Chesapeake Energy Arena; 18,203	4–2

NBA Finals: 1–4 (home: 1–1; road: 0–3)

Game	Date	Team	Score	High points	High rebounds	High assists	Location Attendance	Series
1	June 12	Miami	W 105–94	Kevin Durant (36)	Nick Collison (10)	Russell Westbrook (11)	Chesapeake Energy Arena; 18,203	1–0
2	June 14	Miami	L 96–100	Kevin Durant (32)	Kendrick Perkins (8)	Russell Westbrook (7)	Chesapeake Energy Arena; 18,203	1–1
3	June 17	@ Miami	L 85–91	Kevin Durant (25)	Kendrick Perkins (12)	James Harden (6)	American Airlines Arena; 20,003	1–2
4	June 19	@ Miami	L 98–104	Russell Westbrook (43)	James Harden (10)	Russell Westbrook (5)	American Airlines Arena; 20,003	1–3
5	June 21	@ Miami	L 106–121	Kevin Durant (32)	Kevin Durant (11)	Russell Westbrook (6)	American Airlines Arena; 20,003	1–4

2012 playoff schedule

== Player statistics ==
Legend
GP	Games played	GS	Games started	MPG	Minutes per game
FG%	Field goal percentage	3P%	3-point field goal percentage	FT%	Free throw percentage
RPG	Rebounds per game	APG	Assists per game	SPG	Steals per game
BPG	Blocks per game	PPG	Points per game	**Bold**	Career high

=== Regular season ===
Oklahoma City Thunder statistics
Player	GP	GS	MPG	FG%	3P%	FT%	RPG	APG	SPG	BPG	PPG
Cole Aldrich	26	0	6.7	52.4%	-	92.9%	1.8	0.1	0.3	0.6	2.2
Nick Collison	63	0	20.7	59.7%	0.0%	71.0%	4.3	1.3	0.5	0.4	4.5
Daequan Cook	57	22	17.4	36.8%	34.6%	63.6%	2.1	0.3	0.4	0.2	5.5
Kevin Durant	66	66	38.6	49.6%	38.7%	86.0%	8.0	3.5	1.3	1.2	28.0
Derek Fisher ^{≠}	20	0	20.4	34.3%	31.4%	92.9%	1.5	0.4	0.6	0.1	4.9
James Harden	62	2	31.4	49.1%	39.0%	84.6%	4.1	3.7	1.0	0.2	16.8
Lazar Hayward	26	0	5.4	34.2%	28.6%	58.3%	0.6	0.2	0.1	0.0	1.4
Serge Ibaka	66	66	27.2	53.5%	33.3%	66.1%	7.5	0.4	0.5	3.7	9.1
Royal Ivey	34	0	10.4	35.6%	34.0%	12.5%	0.7	0.3	0.4	0.0	2.1
Reggie Jackson	45	0	11.1	32.1%	21.0%	86.2%	1.2	1.6	0.6	0.0	3.1
Eric Maynor	9	0	15.2	35.9%	35.3%	100%	1.4	2.4	0.6	0.0	4.2
Nazr Mohammed	63	1	11.0	46.7%	0.0%	56.5%	2.7	0.2	0.3	0.6	2.7
Kendrick Perkins	65	65	26.8	48.9%	-	65.2%	6.6	1.2	0.4	1.1	5.1
Ryan Reid ^{‡}	5	0	3.4	80.0%	-	-	0.4	0.0	0.0	0.0	1.6
Thabo Sefolosha	42	42	21.8	43.2%	43.7%	88.4%	3.0	1.1	0.9	0.4	4.8
Russell Westbrook	66	66	35.3	45.7%	31.6%	82.3%	4.6	5.5	1.7	0.3	23.6

Led team in statistic

After all games.
^{‡} Waived during the season
^{†} Traded during the season
^{≠} Acquired during the season

=== Playoffs ===
Oklahoma City Thunder statistics
Player	GP	GS	MPG	FG%	3P%	FT%	RPG	APG	SPG	BPG	PPG
Cole Aldrich	5	0	5.0	44.4%	-	50.0%	2.6	0.0	0.0	0.0	2.0
Nick Collison	20	0	16.6	64.7%	-	42.9%	3.4	1.0	0.6	0.3	3.5
Daequan Cook	16	0	6.8	37.8%	33.3%	0.0%	0.6	0.3	0.2	0.0	2.3
Kevin Durant	20	20	41.9	51.7%	37.3%	86.4%	7.4	3.7	1.5	1.2	28.5
Derek Fisher	20	0	22.3	41.5%	37.5%	100%	1.6	1.3	0.9	0.1	6.3
James Harden	20	0	31.5	43.5%	41.0%	85.7%	5.1	3.4	1.6	0.1	16.3
Lazar Hayward	5	0	3.6	66.7%	-	-	0.8	0.0	0.0	0.0	0.8
Serge Ibaka	20	20	28.5	52.8%	25.0%	72.2%	5.8	0.6	0.6	3.0	9.8
Royal Ivey	5	0	4.2	36.4%	40.0%	50.0%	0.6	0.2	0.4	0.0	2.2
Nazr Mohammed	8	0	10.4	50.0%	-	50.0%	2.0	0.1	0.0	0.4	2.3
Kendrick Perkins	20	20	25.9	41.6%	-	80.0%	6.2	0.7	0.4	1.3	4.7
Thabo Sefolosha	20	20	22.3	40.2%	32.7%	88.9%	2.7	1.3	1.5	0.5	5.3
Russell Westbrook	20	20	38.4	43.5%	27.7%	80.2%	5.5	5.9	1.6	0.4	23.1

Led team in statistic

After all games.

=== Individual game highs ===
Category	Player	Statistic
Points	Kevin Durant	51 vs Nuggets on February 19, 2012
Rebounds	Serge Ibaka	20 vs Suns on March 7, 2012
Assists	Russell Westbrook	11 vs Warriors on January 27, 2012
Steals	Russell Westbrook; Thabo Sefolosha	7 vs Warriors on January 27, 2012; 7 vs Bucks on April 9, 2012
Blocks	Serge Ibaka	11 vs Nuggets on February 19, 2012
Minutes	Kevin Durant	52:24 vs Timberwolves on March 23, 2012

Category	Player	Statistic
Field goals made	Kevin Durant	19 vs Nuggets on February 19, 2012
Threes made	James Harden; Daequan Cook; Kevin Durant; Kevin Durant; James Harden; Kevin Durant	5 vs Pistons on January 23, 2012; 5 vs Warriors on February 7, 2012; 5 vs Nuggets on February 19, 2012; 5 vs Magic on March 1, 2012; 5 vs Suns on April 18, 2012; 5 vs Nuggets on April 25, 2012
Free throws made	Kevin Durant	5 vs Kings on April 24, 2012
Double-doubles	Kevin Durant	18
Triple-doubles	Serge Ibaka	1

== Awards and records ==
=== Awards ===
Date	Player	Award
January 3, 2012	Kevin Durant (1/3)	December 25–January 1 Player of the Week (Note: Durant helped the Thunder to a 5-0 start as well, averaging a Western Conference-best 27.4 points (second overall), while shooting .547 from the field and .500 from beyond the arc. Durant opened the 2011-12 campaign with four 30-plus-point performances. He recorded a double-double – 30 points and 11 rebounds – in a 104-102 win over the Mavericks Dec. 29.)
January 30, 2012	Russell Westbrook (1/2)	January 23–29 Player of the Week (Note: Westbrook led the Thunder to a 3-0 week, including wins over the Pistons and Hornets. Westbrook averaged 22.0 points, 7.3 assists, 4.0 rebounds and 3.3 steals. Oklahoma City’s 120-109 victory over the Golden State Warriors on Jan. 27 was keyed by Westbrook’s 28 points, 11 assists, seven steals and six rebounds.)
February 2, 2012	Kevin Durant	All-Star (Note: Oklahoma City Thunder forward Kevin Durant was named a starter on the 2012 Western Conference All-Star team after receiving 1,345,566 votes, second most in the Western Conference, the NBA announced today.)
February 9, 2012	Russell Westbrook	All-Star (Note: For the second straight season, Westbrook will join teammate Kevin Durant on the Western Conference All-Star squad. In his first All-Star appearance, Westbrook finished with 12 points, five rebounds and two assists in 14 minutes of action.)
February 11, 2012	Scott Brooks	Western Conference All-Star Head Coach (Note: Oklahoma City head coach Scott Brooks and his coaching staff will guide the Western Conference All-Stars on February 26th at Amway Center in Orlando, it was announced by the NBA.)
February 13, 2012	Russell Westbrook (2/2)	February 6–12 Player of the Week (Note: Westbrook helped the Thunder to a 3-1 week, averaging 30.0 points, 6.0 rebounds, 5.3 assists and 2.5 steals. Westbrook scored 28 or more points in all four of Oklahoma City’s games, and posted one double-double (28 points, 11 rebounds) on Feb. 6, in a 111-107 win over the Portland Trail Blazers. Westbrook connected on a career-high 15 field goals on Feb. 9, during a 106-101 loss to the Sacramento Kings.)
February 20, 2012	Kevin Durant (2/3)	February 13–19 Player of the Week (Note: Durant helped Oklahoma City to a 3-1 week which included wins over the Utah Jazz and Denver Nuggets. Durant averaged 32.0 points and 8.0 rebounds, and shot .585 from the field, .917 from the foul line and .588 from distance. Durant’s career-high 51 points on Feb. 19 propelled the Thunder to a 124-118 win over the Nuggets.)
March 2, 2012	Kevin Durant (1/2)	February Player of the Month (Note: Durant helped the Thunder to a 12-3 month with the help of seven 30-plus-point scoring efforts. He paced the league, averaging 29.1 points. Against Denver on Feb. 19, Durant scored a career-high 51 points to go along with eight rebounds during a 124-118 win. Oklahoma City’s 12 wins for the month was tops in the league, and the 12-3 record equaled the franchise’s best February in history (12-3, 1972). Durant was named MVP of the 2012 NBA All-Star Game in Orlando, thanks to his 36-point performance on Feb. 26, during the West’s 152-149 victory over the East.)
March 26, 2012	Kevin Durant (3/3)	March 19–25 Player of the Week (Note: Durant’s 29.5 ppg ranked second in the league (Kevin Love, 33.5), his 10.3 rpg ranked ninth, and his 2.0 spg tied for fifth best in the Western Conference as he helped the Thunder to a 3-1 week. Durant, the league’s second leading scorer for the season at 27.9 points (Kobe Bryant, 28.3) tallied 40 points and a season-high 17 rebounds on March 25 in a 103-87 win over the Heat.)
April 4, 2012	Kevin Durant (2/2)	March Player of the Month (Note: Durant captured his second consecutive Player of the Month award, leading Oklahoma City to an 11-5 record (second in the Western Conference) in March. Durant ranked second in the league in scoring (27.6 ppg), netting at least 20 points 15 times and eclipsing 30 on five occasions. He added averages of 8.5 rebounds and 3.9 assists, and recorded three double-doubles. In a 149-140 double overtime win against Minnesota on March 23, Durant scored 40 points and grabbed a season-high 17 rebounds. Two nights later, in a 103-87 victory over Miami, Durant had 28 points, nine rebounds and season-high-tying eight assists.)
May 10, 2012	James Harden	Sixth Man of the Year (Note: Harden, the third overall pick of the 2009 NBA Draft, was a model of consistency, scoring in double figures in 58 of 62 contests, while averaging 4.1 rebounds and 3.7 assists in 31.4 minutes per game. He topped the 20-point mark on 15 occasions, with the Thunder going 14-1 in those games. He shot .491 from the field, .846 from the free throw line, and .390 from three-point range.)
May 23, 2012	Serge Ibaka	All-Defensive First Team (Note: In his third NBA season, Ibaka led the NBA and set an all-time franchise record with 3.65 blocks per game. Ibaka’s block per game average was the highest for any NBA player in more than a decade.)
May 24, 2012	Kevin Durant	All-NBA First Team (Note: Durant was named to the All-NBA First Team for a third consecutive season after becoming just the seventh player in NBA history to capture three consecutive scoring crowns. During the 2011-12 season, Durant led the Thunder with 18 doubles-doubles and on Feb. 19 vs. Denver, he recorded a career-best 51 points. During the 2011-12 season, Durant received NBA Player of the Month honors in February and March.)
May 24, 2012	Russell Westbrook	All-NBA Second Team (Note: Westbrook received All-NBA Second Team honors for a second straight season after securing five first place votes and 239 total points. Westbrook currently maintains the longest active games played streak in the NBA (312 games) and registered the fifth highest scoring average in the NBA (23.6 ppg) while leading the Thunder in assists (5.5 apg) during the 2011-12 season.)

== Injuries ==
Player	Duration		Injury	Games missed
Player	Start	End	Injury	Games missed
Thabo Sefolosha	January 3, 2012	January 6, 2012	Flu-like symptoms	1
Eric Maynor	January 8, 2012	November 1, 2012	Torn right ACL	57
Thabo Sefolosha	January 30, 2012	March 13, 2012	Right foot surgery	22
Kendrick Perkins	February 17, 2012	February 19, 2012	Knee contusion	1
James Harden	February 20, 2012	February 22, 2012	Sore ankle	1
Nick Collison	February 20, 2012	February 29, 2012	Quad contusion	3
Daequan Cook	March 21, 2012	April 1, 2012	Right MCL sprain	6
James Harden	April 13, 2012	April 14, 2012	Sore right knee	1
James Harden	April 24, 2012	April 28, 2012	Concussion	2

== Transactions ==
=== Overview ===
Players Added

Via draft

- Reggie Jackson

Via trade

- Lazar Hayward

Via free agency

- Ryan Reid
  (Draft rights)
Players Lost

Via trade

- Byron Mullens
- Robert Vaden

Waived

- Nate Robinson

=== Trades ===
December 13, 2011	To Oklahoma City Thunder Lazar Hayward	To Minnesota Timberwolves Robert Vaden; 2012 second-round pick 2013 second-round pick
December 19, 2011	To Oklahoma City Thunder 2013 second-round pick	To Charlotte Bobcats Byron Mullens

=== Free agency ===
==== Re-signed ====
Date	Player	Contract
December 9, 2011	Daequan Cook	Multi-Year Contract
January 19, 2012	Russell Westbrook	Multi-Year Extension

==== Additions ====
Date	Player	Contract	Former team
December 13, 2011	Ryan Reid	Standard	Tulsa 66ers (D-League)
March 21, 2012	Derek Fisher	Standard	Los Angeles Lakers

==== Subtractions ====
Date	Player	Reason left	New team
December 24, 2011	Nate Robinson	Waived	Golden State Warriors
March 21, 2012	Ryan Reid	Waived	Tulsa 66ers (D-League)
