= 2011–12 Miami Heat season =

Professional basketball team season (won NBA championship)

- NBA champions
- Conference champions
- Division champions
- Head coach: Erik Spoelstra
- President: Pat Riley
- Owner: Micky Arison
- Arena: American Airlines Arena

Results
- Record: 46–20 (.697)
- Place: Division: 1st (Southeast); Conference: 2nd (Eastern)
- Playoff finish: NBA champions (Defeated Thunder 4–1)
- Stats at Basketball Reference

Local media
- Television: Sun Sports
- Radio: 790 The Ticket

The 2011–12 Miami Heat season was the franchise's 24th season in the National Basketball Association (NBA). They came into the season as the defending Eastern Conference champions, the second season playing with the "Big Three" of Dwyane Wade, LeBron James, and Chris Bosh, and the fourth season under head coach Erik Spoelstra. Prior to the beginning of the season, they looked to bounce back from their disappointing finish to the previous year where they lost to the Dallas Mavericks in the NBA Finals.

Following the 2011 NBA lockout, the Heat, like every other team in the league, played only 66 games this season. Despite a hot 28–7 start to the season, they struggled in their last 31 games, only going 18–13 the rest of the way, and eventually finishing with a 46–20 record, roughly the equivalent of 57–25. They won their division for the 9th time and appeared in the Eastern Conference Finals for the 5th time. For the second consecutive year, Wade, James, and Bosh were all selected to the 2012 NBA All-Star Game, tying the record for the most Heat players sent to an All-Star game in franchise history.

In the playoffs, they met the New York Knicks in first round, reigniting the Heat-Knicks rivalry as it was their first postseason meeting since 2000. However, the notion of a heated rivalry fell flat as the Heat defeated the Knicks in 5 games, beating their arch rivals in a playoff series for the first time since 1997. Next, they faced Indiana Pacers in the conference semifinals and defeated them in 6 games despite losing Bosh in Game 1 to injury. Then, in the Eastern Conference Finals, the Heat met the Boston Celtics for their third consecutive postseason meeting. The Heat took a 2–0 series lead before losing 3 straight. However, the Heat forced a Game 7 thanks to an epic 45 point performance by James in Game 6. On June 9, 2012, the Heat won Game 7 of the Eastern Conference Finals to advance to the NBA Finals for the second consecutive year and 3rd time in franchise history.

In the NBA Finals, the Heat faced the Oklahoma City Thunder, who entered the NBA Finals as favorites thanks to home court advantage. Despite losing Game 1 in Oklahoma City, the Heat battled back by winning the next three straight games to take a 3–1 series lead. On June 21, 2012, the Miami Heat won the NBA Championship at home against the Oklahoma City Thunder with a 121–106 Game 5 victory, winning the NBA Finals 4–1 to become the 2012 NBA Champions. This was the second NBA championship for the franchise, as well as the Heat's first since 2006. They also became the third (and final) team under the 2-3-2 format to win the middle three games at home, the others being their 2006 team and the 2004 Detroit Pistons. LeBron James won an NBA championship for the first time in his career, and was awarded the 2012 NBA Finals MVP. During their postseason run, the 2011-12 Miami Heat became the second team in NBA history to win a championship despite trailing three separate times in a postseason series (2–1 in the conference semifinals, 3–2 in the conference finals, and 0–1 in the NBA Finals), with the first being the 1995 Houston Rockets.

== Key dates ==
- June 23: The 2011 NBA draft took place at Prudential Center in Newark, New Jersey.
- December 9: The free agency period started.
- December 18: The Heat pre-season started with a game against the Orlando Magic.
- December 25: The Heat avenged their 2011 NBA Finals loss with a 105–94 win over the Dallas Mavericks to open the season.
- December 27: The Heat won their home opener against the Boston Celtics 115–107.
- February 7: With a 19–6 season start, the Heat marked their best start in franchise history.
- February 14: The Heat became the first team to win three road games (Hawks, Bucks, & Pacers) on three consecutive nights by double digits since the 1970–71 Milwaukee Bucks.
- February 23: The Heat went into the All Star Break with their best win percentage (.794) in team history.
- February 25–26: The 2012 NBA All-Star Weekend took place.
- April 3: The Heat clinched a playoff spot with a 99–93 win over the Philadelphia 76ers.
- April 15: The Heat clinched a back to back (9th) Southeast Division title with a 93–85 win over the New York Knicks.
- April 22: The Heat defeated the Houston Rockets 97–88 in their final regular season home game.
- April 24: The Heat clinched the 2nd seed for the Eastern Conference after losing to the Boston Celtics 78–66.
- April 26: The Heat ended the regular season with a 104–70 loss against the Washington Wizards.
- May 9: The Heat defeated the New York Knicks in Game 5 of the Eastern Conference First Round, advancing to the Conference Semi-finals.
- May 24: The Heat defeated the Indiana Pacers in Game 6 of the Eastern Conference Semi-finals, advancing to the Conference Finals.
- June 9: The Heat defeated the Boston Celtics in Game 7 of the Eastern Conference Finals, advancing to the 2012 NBA Finals.
- June 21: The Heat defeated the Oklahoma City Thunder in Game 5 of the NBA Finals, winning the franchise's second championship. LeBron James was named NBA Finals MVP.

== Season summary ==
When the Heat made it all the way to the finals in Dwyane Wade, LeBron James, and Chris Bosh's first year playing together, they were seen as heavy favorites from the Eastern Conference to return in 2012. The team's original starting lineup was:
C – Joel Anthony
PF – Chris Bosh
SF – LeBron James
SG – Dwyane Wade
PG – Mario Chalmers

The starting lineup would go through many changes as the season went on. The finals lineup in the NBA Finals is listed above.

== Draft picks ==
Round	Pick	Player	Position	Nationality	College/Team
2	31	Bojan Bogdanović (traded to Minnesota Timberwolves)	SF/SG	Croatia	Fenerbahçe Ülker

== Roster ==
2011–12 Miami Heat roster
Players

Pos.	No.	Player	Height	Weight	DOB	From
F/C	50	Joel Anthony	6 ft 9 in (2.06 m)	245 lb (111 kg)	1982-08-09	UNLV
F	31	Shane Battier	6 ft 8 in (2.03 m)	220 lb (100 kg)	1978-09-09	Duke
F	1	Chris Bosh	6 ft 11 in (2.11 m)	235 lb (107 kg)	1984-05-19	Georgia Tech
G	15	Mario Chalmers	6 ft 2 in (1.88 m)	190 lb (86 kg)	1986–03–24	Kansas
G	30	Norris Cole	6 ft 2 in (1.88 m)	170 lb (77 kg)	1988-10-13	Cleveland State
C	34	Eddy Curry	7 ft 0 in (2.13 m)	295 lb (134 kg)	1982-12-05	Thornwood HS (IL)
G	14	Terrel Harris	6 ft 5 in (1.96 m)	190 lb (86 kg)	1987-08-10	Oklahoma State
F	40	Udonis Haslem	6 ft 8 in (2.03 m)	235 lb (107 kg)	1980-06-09	Florida
F	5	Juwan Howard	6 ft 9 in (2.06 m)	250 lb (113 kg)	1973-02-07	Michigan
F	6	LeBron James	6 ft 8 in (2.03 m)	250 lb (113 kg)	1984-12-30	St. Vincent–St. Mary HS (OH)
F	22	James Jones	6 ft 8 in (2.03 m)	215 lb (98 kg)	1980-10-04	Miami (FL)
G/F	13	Mike Miller	6 ft 8 in (2.03 m)	218 lb (99 kg)	1980-02-19	Florida
C	45	Dexter Pittman	6 ft 11 in (2.11 m)	308 lb (140 kg)	1988-03-02	Texas
C	21	Ronny Turiaf	6 ft 10 in (2.08 m)	245 lb (111 kg)	1983-01-13	Gonzaga
G	3	Dwyane Wade	6 ft 4 in (1.93 m)	220 lb (100 kg)	1982-01-17	Marquette

Coaches
Head coach
- Erik Spoelstra
Assistant(s)
- Keith Askins
- Octavio De La Grana
- David Fizdale
- Bill Foran
- Chet Kammerer
- Bob McAdoo
- Ron Rothstein

Legend
- (DP) Unsigned draft pick
- (FA) Free agent
- (S) Suspended
- Injured

Roster
Updated: March 21, 2012

== Pre-season ==
2011 pre-season game log
Pre-season: 1–1 (home: 1–0; road: 0–1)

Game	Date	Team	Score	High points	High rebounds	High assists	Location Attendance	Record
1	December 18	Orlando	W 118–85	LeBron James (19)	Udonis Haslem (9)	Norris Cole (8)	American Airlines Arena; 20,100	1–0
2	December 21	@ Orlando	L 100–104	LeBron James (27)	Chris Bosh (7)	Chris Bosh (4)	Amway Center; 19,045	1–1

2011–12 season schedule

== Regular season ==
=== Standings ===
Southeast Division	W	L	PCT	GB	Home	Road	Div	GP
y-Miami Heat	46	20	.697	–	28–5	18–15	9–5	66
x-Atlanta Hawks	40	26	.606	6	23–10	17–16	11–3	66
x-Orlando Magic	37	29	.561	9	21–12	16–17	8–7	66
Washington Wizards	20	46	.303	26	11–22	9–24	7–7	66
Charlotte Bobcats	7	59	.106	39	4–29	3–30	1–14	66

Eastern Conference
#	Team	W	L	PCT	GB	GP
1	z-Chicago Bulls	50	16	.758	–	66
2	y-Miami Heat *	46	20	.697	4.0	66
3	x-Indiana Pacers *	42	24	.636	8.0	66
4	y-Boston Celtics	39	27	.591	11.0	66
5	x-Atlanta Hawks	40	26	.606	10.0	66
6	x-Orlando Magic	37	29	.561	13.0	66
7	x-New York Knicks	36	30	.545	14.0	66
8	x-Philadelphia 76ers	35	31	.530	15.0	66
9	Milwaukee Bucks	31	35	.470	19.0	66
10	Detroit Pistons	25	41	.379	25.0	66
11	Toronto Raptors	23	43	.348	27.0	66
12	New Jersey Nets	22	44	.333	28.0	66
13	Cleveland Cavaliers	21	45	.318	29.0	66
14	Washington Wizards	20	46	.303	30.0	66
15	Charlotte Bobcats	7	59	.106	43.0	66

=== Game log ===
2011–12 game log
Total: 46–20 (Home: 28–5; Road: 18–15)
December: 4–0 (home: 1–0; road: 3–0)

Game	Date	Team	Score	High points	High rebounds	High assists	Location Attendance	Record
1	December 25	@ Dallas	W 105–94	LeBron James (37)	Udonis Haslem (14)	LeBron James; Dwyane Wade (6)	American Airlines Center; 20,421	1–0
2	December 27	Boston	W 115–107	LeBron James (26)	Udonis Haslem (12)	Dwyane Wade (8)	American Airlines Arena; 20,166	2–0
3	December 28	@ Charlotte	W 96–95	LeBron James (35)	Bosh, James & Haslem (6)	LeBron James (7)	Time Warner Cable Arena; 19,614	3–0
4	December 30	@ Minnesota	W 103–101	LeBron James (34)	Chris Bosh; Udonis Haslem (9)	LeBron James (10)	Target Center; 19,356	4–0

January: 12–5 (home: 9–2; road: 3–3)

Game	Date	Team	Score	High points	High rebounds	High assists	Location Attendance	Record
5	January 1	Charlotte	W 129–90	Chris Bosh (24)	Chris Bosh (10)	Norris Cole (9)	American Airlines Arena; 20,016	5–0
6	January 2	Atlanta	L 92–100	LeBron James (28)	Udonis Haslem (10)	Dwyane Wade (10)	American Airlines Arena; 20,078	5–1
7	January 4	Indiana	W 118–83	LeBron James (33)	Udonis Haslem (10)	LeBron James (13)	American Airlines Arena; 20,201	6–1
8	January 5	@ Atlanta	W 116–109 (OT)	Chris Bosh (33)	Chris Bosh; Terrel Harris (14)	Mario Chalmers (8)	Philips Arena; 18,371	7–1
9	January 7	@ New Jersey	W 101–90	LeBron James (32)	Udonis Haslem (12)	LeBron James (9)	Prudential Center; 18,711	8–1
10	January 10	@ Golden State	L 106–111 (OT)	Dwyane Wade (34)	LeBron James (11)	LeBron James (7)	Oracle Arena; 19,596	8–2
11	January 11	@ L. A. Clippers	L 89–95 (OT)	LeBron James (23)	LeBron James (13)	LeBron James (7)	Staples Center; 19,341	8–3
12	January 13	@ Denver	L 103–117	LeBron James (35)	Udonis Haslem (11)	LeBron James (6)	Pepsi Center; 19,155	8–4
13	January 17	San Antonio	W 120–98	LeBron James (33)	Chris Bosh (8)	LeBron James (10)	American Airlines Arena; 19,600	9–4
14	January 19	L. A. Lakers	W 98–87	LeBron James (31)	Bosh, James & Haslem (8)	LeBron James (8)	American Airlines Arena; 20,004	10–4
15	January 21	Philadelphia	W 113–92	Chris Bosh (30)	Udonis Haslem (10)	Mario Chalmers (8)	American Airlines Arena; 19,725	11–4
16	January 22	Milwaukee	L 82–91	LeBron James (28)	LeBron James (13)	LeBron James (5)	American Airlines Arena; 19,600	11–5
17	January 24	Cleveland	W 92–85	Chris Bosh (35)	Udonis Haslem (10)	LeBron James (5)	American Airlines Arena; 19,600	12–5
18	January 25	@ Detroit	W 101–98	LeBron James (32)	LeBron James (6)	LeBron James (7)	The Palace of Auburn Hills; 18,058	13–5
19	January 27	New York	W 99–89	LeBron James (31)	Chris Bosh (9)	LeBron James (7)	American Airlines Arena; 19,707	14–5
20	January 29	Chicago	W 97–93	LeBron James (35)	Chris Bosh (12)	Dwyane Wade (7)	American Airlines Arena; 20,054	15–5
21	January 30	New Orleans	W 109–95	LeBron James; Dwyane Wade (22)	LeBron James (11)	LeBron James (8)	American Airlines Arena; 19,600	16–5

February: 11–2 (home: 5–0; road: 6–2)

Game	Date	Team	Score	High points	High rebounds	High assists	Location Attendance	Record
22	February 1	@ Milwaukee	L 97–105	LeBron James (40)	Chris Bosh (9)	Dwyane Wade (6)	Bradley Center; 10,265	16–6
23	February 3	@ Philadelphia	W 99–79	Dwyane Wade (26)	LeBron James (8)	LeBron James (12)	Wells Fargo Center; 20,694	17–6
24	February 5	Toronto	W 95–89	LeBron James (30)	LeBron James (9)	LeBron James (4)	American Airlines Arena; 19,802	18–6
25	February 7	Cleveland	W 107–91	Dwyane Wade (26)	LeBron James (6)	Chris Bosh (9)	American Airlines Arena; 20,078	19–6
26	February 8	@ Orlando	L 89–102	Dwyane Wade (33)	LeBron James(10)	Chris Bosh (9)	Amway Center; 18,972	19–7
27	February 10	@ Washington	W 106–89	Dwyane Wade (26)	LeBron James (9)	Udonis Haslem (12)	Verizon Center; 20,282	20–7
28	February 12	@ Atlanta	W 107–87	LeBron James (23)	LeBron James (6)	Chris Bosh (26)	Philips Arena; 18,371	21–7
29	February 13	@ Milwaukee	W 114–96	LeBron James (35)	Mike Miller (8)	Chris Bosh (4)	Bradley Center; 16,749	22–7
30	February 14	@ Indiana	W 105–90	LeBron James (23)	LeBron James (9)	LeBron James (7)	Bankers Life Fieldhouse; 18,165	23–7
31	February 17	@ Cleveland	W 111–87	LeBron James (28)	Chris Bosh (12)	LeBron James; Mario Chalmers (5)	Quicken Loans Arena; 20,562	24–7
32	February 19	Orlando	W 90–78	Dwyane Wade (27)	LeBron James (11)	LeBron James (8)	American Airlines Arena; 20,185	25–7
33	February 21	Sacramento	W 120–108	Dwyane Wade (30)	Chris Bosh (10)	Dwyane Wade (10)	American Airlines Arena; 20,068	26–7
34	February 23	New York	W 102–88	Chris Bosh (25)	Udonis Haslem; LeBron James (9)	LeBron James (8)	American Airlines Arena; 20,197	27–7
All-Star Break

March: 10–6 (home: 6–0; road: 4–6)

Game	Date	Team	Score	High points	High rebounds	High assists	Location Attendance	Record
35	March 1	@ Portland	W 107–93	LeBron James (38)	Udonis Haslem (14)	Dwyane Wade (10)	Rose Garden; 20,597	28–7
36	March 2	@ Utah	L 98–99	LeBron James (35)	LeBron James (10)	LeBron James (6)	EnergySolutions Arena; 19,991	28–8
37	March 4	@ L. A. Lakers	L 83–93	LeBron James (25)	LeBron James (13)	LeBron James (7)	Staples Center; 18,997	28–9
38	March 6	New Jersey	W 108–78	LeBron James (21)	LeBron James (9)	Mario Chalmers (7)	American Airlines Arena; 19,600	29–9
39	March 7	Atlanta	W 89–86	LeBron James (31)	LeBron James (11)	Dwyane Wade (6)	American Airlines Arena; 20,018	30–9
40	March 10	Indiana	W 93–91 (OT)	Dwyane Wade (28)	Udonis Haslem (11)	Dwyane Wade (7)	American Airlines Arena; 20,154	31–9
41	March 13	@ Orlando	L 98–104 (OT)	Dwyane Wade (28)	LeBron James (11)	LeBron James (8)	Amway Center; 18,879	31–10
42	March 14	@ Chicago	L 102–106	Dwyane Wade (36)	Dwyane Wade (7)	LeBron James (4)	United Center; 23,028	31–11
43	March 16	@ Philadelphia	W 84–78	LeBron James (29)	Dwyane Wade (11)	LeBron James (8)	Wells Fargo Center; 20,396	32–11
44	March 18	Orlando	W 91–81	Dwyane Wade (31)	LeBron James (12)	LeBron James (7)	American Airlines Arena; 20,003	33–11
45	March 20	Phoenix	W 99–95	Chris Bosh (29)	Udonis Haslem (9)	Mario Chalmers (8)	American Airlines Arena; 20,212	34–11
46	March 23	@ Detroit	W 88–73	Dwyane Wade (24)	Chris Bosh; Dwyane Wade (9)	LeBron James (10)	The Palace of Auburn Hills; 22,076	35–11
47	March 25	@ Oklahoma City	L 87–103	Dwyane Wade (22)	Udonis Haslem (9)	LeBron James (7)	Chesapeake Energy Arena; 18,203	35–12
48	March 26	@ Indiana	L 90–105	LeBron James; Dwyane Wade (24)	LeBron James (9)	Dwyane Wade (6)	Bankers Life Fieldhouse; 17,415	35–13
49	March 29	Dallas	W 106–85	Chris Bosh; LeBron James (19)	Chris Bosh; LeBron James (9)	LeBron James; Dwyane Wade (5)	American Airlines Arena; 20,096	36–13
50	March 30	@ Toronto	W 113–101	Chris Bosh; Dwyane Wade (30)	Chris Bosh (8)	LeBron James (9)	Air Canada Centre; 19,883	37–13

April: 9–7 (home: 7–3; road: 2–4)

Game	Date	Team	Score	High points	High rebounds	High assists	Location Attendance	Record
51	April 1	@ Boston	L 72–91	LeBron James (23)	Chris Bosh (11)	Chris Bosh (4)	TD Garden; 18,624	37–14
52	April 3	Philadelphia	W 99–93	LeBron James (41)	Udonis Haslem (11)	Mario Chalmers; LeBron James (4)	American Airlines Arena; 20,015	38–14
53	April 4	Oklahoma City	W 98–93	LeBron James (34)	Udonis Haslem (8)	LeBron James (10)	American Airlines Arena; 20,104	39–14
54	April 6	Memphis	L 82–97	LeBron James (21)	Dwyane Wade (7)	LeBron James (6)	American Airlines Arena; 20,008	39–15
55	April 8	Detroit	W 98–75	LeBron James (26)	Chris Bosh; Ronny Turiaf (9)	Shane Battier; Mario Chalmers (5)	American Airlines Arena; 20,017	40–15
56	April 10	Boston	L 107–115	LeBron James (36)	Chris Bosh (9)	LeBron James (7)	American Airlines Arena; 19,954	40–16
57	April 12	@ Chicago	L 86–96 (OT)	LeBron James (30)	Chris Bosh; Ronny Turiaf (8)	LeBron James (5)	United Center; 23,015	40–17
58	April 13	Charlotte	W 105–82	LeBron James (19)	LeBron James (9)	LeBron James (5)	American Airlines Arena; 19,600	41–17
59	April 15	@ New York	W 93–85	LeBron James (29)	Chris Bosh (14)	Dwyane Wade (4)	Madison Square Garden; 19,763	42–17
60	April 16	@ New Jersey	W 101–98	LeBron James (37)	Chris Bosh (15)	LeBron James (7)	Prudential Center; 18,711	43–17
61	April 18	Toronto	W 96–72	LeBron James (28)	Udonis Haslem (7)	Mario Chalmers (7)	American Airlines Arena; 19,600	44–17
62	April 19	Chicago	W 83–72	LeBron James (27)	LeBron James (11)	LeBron James (6)	American Airlines Arena; 20,008	45–17
63	April 21	Washington	L 84–86	Mario Chalmers (16)	Udonis Haslem (15)	Mario Chalmers (6)	American Airlines Arena; 19,722	45–18
64	April 22	Houston	W 97–88	LeBron James (32)	Udonis Haslem (11)	LeBron James (5)	American Airlines Arena; 19,859	46–18
65	April 24	@ Boston	L 66–78	Dexter Pittman (12)	Udonis Haslem (13)	Mario Chalmers (5)	TD Garden; 18,624	46–19
66	April 26	@ Washington	L 70–104	Norris Cole (14)	Harris, Howard & Turiaf (5)	Terrel Harris (3)	Verizon Center; 19,537	46–20

2011–12 season schedule

== Playoffs ==
=== Game log ===
2012 playoff game log
Total: 16–7 (Home: 11–2; Road: 5–5)
First round: 4–1 (home: 3–0; road: 1–1)

Game	Date	Team	Score	High points	High rebounds	High assists	Location Attendance	Series
1	April 28	New York	W 100–67	LeBron James (32)	Udonis Haslem (8)	Mario Chalmers (9)	American Airlines Arena; 19,621	1–0
2	April 30	New York	W 104–94	Dwyane Wade (25)	Udonis Haslem (8)	LeBron James (9)	American Airlines Arena; 19,684	2–0
3	May 3	@ New York	W 87–70	LeBron James (32)	Chris Bosh (10)	LeBron James (5)	Madison Square Garden; 19,763	3–0
4	May 6	@ New York	L 87–89	LeBron James (27)	Chris Bosh (9)	Dwyane Wade (6)	Madison Square Garden; 19,763	3–1
5	May 9	New York	W 106–94	LeBron James (29)	LeBron James (8)	LeBron James (7)	American Airlines Arena; 19,754	4–1

Conference Semi-finals: 4–2 (home: 2–1; road: 2–1)

Game	Date	Team	Score	High points	High rebounds	High assists	Location Attendance	Series
1	May 13	Indiana	W 95–86	LeBron James (32)	LeBron James (15)	LeBron James (5)	American Airlines Arena; 19,600	1–0
2	May 15	Indiana	L 75–78	LeBron James (28)	LeBron James (9)	LeBron James (5)	American Airlines Arena; 19,828	1–1
3	May 17	@ Indiana	L 75–94	Mario Chalmers (25)	Ronny Turiaf (8)	Mario Chalmers (5)	Bankers Life Fieldhouse; 18,165	1–2
4	May 20	@ Indiana	W 101–93	LeBron James (40)	LeBron James (18)	LeBron James (9)	Bankers Life Fieldhouse; 18,165	2–2
5	May 22	Indiana	W 115–83	LeBron James (30)	Mario Chalmers (11)	LeBron James (8)	American Airlines Arena; 20,097	3–2
6	May 24	@ Indiana	W 105–93	Dwyane Wade (41)	Dwyane Wade (10)	LeBron James (7)	Bankers Life Fieldhouse; 18,165	4–2

Conference Finals: 4–3 (home: 3–1; road: 1–2)

Game	Date	Team	Score	High points	High rebounds	High assists	Location Attendance	Series
1	May 28	Boston	W 93–79	LeBron James (32)	LeBron James (13)	Dwyane Wade (7)	American Airlines Arena; 19,912	1–0
2	May 30	Boston	W 115–111 (OT)	LeBron James (34)	Udonis Haslem (11)	LeBron James (7)	American Airlines Arena; 19,973	2–0
3	June 1	@ Boston	L 91–101	LeBron James (34)	LeBron James (8)	Mario Chalmers (6)	TD Garden; 18,624	2–1
4	June 3	@ Boston	L 91–93 (OT)	LeBron James (29)	Udonis Haslem (17)	Dwyane Wade (6)	TD Garden; 18,624	2–2
5	June 5	Boston	L 90–94	LeBron James (30)	Udonis Haslem (14)	Chalmers & Wade (3)	American Airlines Arena; 20,021	2–3
6	June 7	@ Boston	W 98–79	LeBron James (45)	LeBron James (15)	LeBron James (5)	TD Garden; 18,624	3–3
7	June 9	Boston	W 101–88	LeBron James (31)	LeBron James (12)	Mario Chalmers (7)	American Airlines Arena; 20,114	4–3

NBA Finals: 4–1 (home: 3–0; road: 1–1)

Game	Date	Team	Score	High points	High rebounds	High assists	Location Attendance	Series
1	June 12	@ Oklahoma City	L 94–105	LeBron James (30)	Udonis Haslem (11)	Dwyane Wade (8)	Chesapeake Energy Arena; 18,203	0–1
2	June 14	@ Oklahoma City	W 100–96	LeBron James (32)	Chris Bosh (15)	James & Wade (5)	Chesapeake Energy Arena; 18,203	1–1
3	June 17	Oklahoma City	W 91–85	LeBron James (29)	LeBron James (14)	Dwyane Wade (7)	American Airlines Arena; 20,003	2–1
4	June 19	Oklahoma City	W 104–98	LeBron James (26)	Bosh & James (9)	LeBron James (12)	American Airlines Arena; 20,003	3–1
5	June 21	Oklahoma City	W 121–106	LeBron James (26)	LeBron James (11)	LeBron James (13)	American Airlines Arena; 20,003	4–1

2012 playoff schedule

== Player statistics ==
=== Regular season ===
Player	POS	GP	GS	MP	REB	AST	STL	BLK	PTS	MPG	RPG	APG	SPG	BPG	PPG
Shane Battier	SF	65	10	1,499	156	82	64	33	311	23.1	2.4	1.3	1.0	.5	4.8
Norris Cole	PG	65	2	1,260	91	133	44	2	441	19.4	1.4	2.0	.7	.0	6.8
Mario Chalmers	PG	64	64	1,825	171	222	97	11	627	28.5	2.7	3.5	1.5	.2	9.8
Joel Anthony	C	64	51	1,349	250	9	36	84	219	21.1	3.9	.1	.6	1.3	3.4
Udonis Haslem	PF	64	10	1,589	470	42	35	24	385	24.8	7.3	.7	.5	.4	6.0
LeBron James	SF	62	62	2,326	492	387	115	50	1,683	37.5	7.9	6.2	1.9	.8	27.1
Chris Bosh	PF	57	57	2,007	452	103	51	45	1,025	35.2	7.9	1.8	.9	.8	18.0
James Jones	SG	51	10	666	49	19	17	9	185	13.1	1.0	.4	.3	.2	3.6
Dwyane Wade	SG	49	49	1,625	237	225	82	63	1,082	33.2	4.8	4.6	1.7	1.3	22.1
Mike Miller	SG	39	2	752	128	42	14	6	237	19.3	3.3	1.1	.4	.2	6.1
Dexter Pittman	C	35	6	301	71	9	8	8	106	8.6	2.0	.3	.2	.2	3.0
Juwan Howard	PF	28	0	190	47	10	4	1	42	6.8	1.7	.4	.1	.0	1.5
Terrel Harris	SG	22	1	318	51	26	9	2	80	14.5	2.3	1.2	.4	.1	3.6
Eddy Curry	C	14	1	83	12	1	0	2	30	5.9	.9	.1	.0	.1	2.1
Ronny Turiaf^{†}	C	13	5	221	58	5	8	14	45	17.0	4.5	.4	.6	1.1	3.5
Mickell Gladness^{†}	PF	8	0	28	11	2	1	1	2	3.5	1.4	.3	.1	.1	.3

- ^{†} Denotes player spent time with another team in the season. Stats reflect time with the Heat only.

=== Playoffs ===
Player	POS	GP	GS	MP	REB	AST	STL	BLK	PTS	MPG	RPG	APG	SPG	BPG	PPG
LeBron James	SF	23	23	983	224	129	43	16	697	42.7	9.7	5.6	1.9	.7	30.3
Dwyane Wade	SG	23	23	907	120	100	39	30	525	39.4	5.2	4.3	1.7	1.3	22.8
Mario Chalmers	PG	23	23	819	84	90	28	6	260	35.6	3.7	3.9	1.2	.3	11.3
Shane Battier	SF	23	16	768	74	27	22	14	161	33.4	3.2	1.2	1.0	.6	7.0
Mike Miller	SG	23	0	368	58	17	9	2	120	16.0	2.5	.7	.4	.1	5.2
Udonis Haslem	PF	22	11	452	141	13	5	6	106	20.5	6.4	.6	.2	.3	4.8
James Jones	SG	20	0	173	20	2	3	1	51	8.7	1.0	.1	.2	.1	2.6
Norris Cole	PG	19	0	170	10	12	7	0	34	8.9	.5	.6	.4	.0	1.8
Joel Anthony	C	17	1	329	55	2	5	16	54	19.4	3.2	.1	.3	.9	3.2
Chris Bosh	PF	14	10	439	109	8	6	14	196	31.4	7.8	.6	.4	1.0	14.0
Ronny Turiaf	C	12	7	121	31	1	1	8	23	10.1	2.6	.1	.1	.7	1.9
Juwan Howard	PF	9	0	24	1	0	0	0	7	2.7	.1	.0	.0	.0	.8
Terrel Harris	SG	4	0	10	3	0	0	0	5	2.5	.8	.0	.0	.0	1.3
Dexter Pittman	C	3	1	8	0	1	0	1	0	2.7	.0	.3	.0	.3	.0

== Awards, records and milestones ==
=== Awards ===
==== Week/Month ====
- On January 3, 2012 LeBron James was named Eastern Conference's Player of the Week (December 25 – January 1).
- On January 9, 2012 LeBron James was named Eastern Conference's Player of the Week (January 2 – January 8).
- On January 30, 2012 LeBron James was named Eastern Conference's Player of the Week (January 23 – January 29).
- On February 3, 2012 LeBron James was named Eastern Conference's Player of the Month (December – January).
- On February 20, 2012 LeBron James was named Eastern Conference's Player of the Week (February 13 – February 19).
- On March 1, 2012 Erik Spoelstra was named Eastern Conference's Coach of the Month (February).
- On March 2, 2012 LeBron James was named Eastern Conference's Player of the Month (February).
- On April 9, 2012 LeBron James was named Eastern Conference's Player of the Week (April 2 – April 8).
- On April 23, 2012 LeBron James was named Eastern Conference's Player of the Week (April 16 – April 22).

==== All-Star ====
- LeBron James was voted to his 8th consecutive NBA All-Star Game as a starter (8th consecutive time as a starter).
- Dwyane Wade was voted to his 8th consecutive NBA All-Star Game (7th consecutive time as a starter).
- Chris Bosh was selected to his 7th consecutive NBA All-Star Game (5th consecutive time as a reserve).
- Mario Chalmers and James Jones were selected to participate in the 2012 NBA All-Star Three-point Shootout.
- Rookie Norris Cole was selected to participate in the 2012 Rising Stars challenge.

==== Season ====
- On May 12, 2012 LeBron James won the NBA Most Valuable Player Award for the 3rd time (1st with the Heat).
- On May 23, 2012 LeBron James was named to the NBA All-Defensive First Team for the 4th consecutive time (2nd with the Heat).
- On May 24, 2012 LeBron James was named to the All-NBA First Team.
- On May 24, 2012 Dwyane Wade was named to the All-NBA Third Team.

==== Playoffs ====
- On June 21, 2012 LeBron James was named the NBA Finals Most Valuable Player.

=== Records ===
- On February 3, 2012 LeBron James became the youngest player to have reached 18,000 career points.
- On April 19, 2012 LeBron James became the youngest player to have reached 19,000 career points.

=== Milestones ===
- On February 3, 2012 LeBron James reached 18,000 career points.
- On March 26, 2012 Dwyane Wade reached 600 career blocks.
- On April 19, 2012 LeBron James reached 19,000 career points.

== Transactions ==
=== Trades ===
June 23, 2011
To Miami Heat

- (United States) Norris Cole
To Minnesota Timberwolves

- (Croatia) Bojan Bogdanović
  2014 Second-Round Pick
  Cash Considerations

=== Free agents ===
==== Additions ====
Player	Signed	Former Team
Mario Chalmers	Signed 3 Year Contract For $12.0 Million	Miami Heat
Juwan Howard	Signed 1 Year Contract For $1.32 Million	Miami Heat
James Jones	Signed 3 Year Contract For $4.5 Million	Miami Heat
Shane Battier	Signed 3 Year Contract For $9.4 Million	Memphis Grizzlies
Eddy Curry	Signed 1 Year Contract For $1.22 Million	Minnesota Timberwolves
Mickell Gladness	Signed 1 Year Contract For $171,872	Dakota Wizards (D-League)
Terrel Harris	Signed 1 Year Contract For $473,604	Rio Grande Valley Vipers (D-League)

==== Subtractions ====
Player	Reason Left	New Team
Mike Bibby	Free Agent	New York Knicks
Erick Dampier	Free Agent	Atlanta Hawks
Jamaal Magloire	Free Agent	Toronto Raptors
Žydrūnas Ilgauskas	Retired	
Mickell Gladness	Waived	Golden State Warriors
Eddie House	Waived	

== See also ==
- 2011–12 NBA season
