= Ryan Reid (basketball) =

American basketball player (1986–2025)

Personal information
- Born: October 30, 1986 Lauderdale Lakes, Florida, U.S.
- Died: July 9, 2025 (aged 38)
- Listed height: 6 ft 8 in (2.03 m)
- Listed weight: 235 lb (107 kg)

Career information
- High school: Boyd Anderson (Lauderdale Lakes, Florida)
- College: Florida State (2006–2010)
- NBA draft: 2010: 2nd round, 57th overall pick
- Drafted by: Indiana Pacers
- Playing career: 2010–2019
- Position: Power forward
- Number: 33

Career history
- 2010–2011: Tulsa 66ers
- 2011–2012: Oklahoma City Thunder
- 2012: →Tulsa 66ers
- 2012: Mets de Guaynabo
- 2012–2014: Chorale Roanne
- 2014–2015: SLUC Nancy
- 2015–2016: Niigata Albirex BB
- 2016–2017: Shimane Susanoo Magic
- 2018: St. John's Edge
- 2018–2019: Kanazawa Samuraiz
- Stats at NBA.com
- Stats at Basketball Reference

Ryan Rupert Reid (October 30, 1986 – July 9, 2025) was an American professional basketball player.

Reid played college basketball with the Florida State Seminoles. After four years in college, he was drafted by the Indiana Pacers with the 57th pick in the 2010 NBA draft. After the draft, his draft rights were immediately traded to the Oklahoma City Thunder. However, the Thunder did not sign him to a contract and Reid went on to play for the Tulsa 66ers, the NBA Development League (NBA D-League) affiliate of the Thunder. He played for the 66ers for one season before he was signed by the Thunder for the 2011–12 season.

== Early life ==
Ryan Reid was born to Jasmine and Kenneth Mullings. He was born and grew up in Lauderdale Lakes, Florida. He attended and played for Boyd Anderson High School in his hometown. During his last three years with Boyd Anderson, he averaged 18 points, 12 rebounds and 3 blocked shots. After graduating in 2005, he attended Florida State University. He reportedly chose Florida State over Florida, Miami, Georgia, Houston and Pittsburgh. He also played basketball in the Amateur Athletic Union (AAU) with the Tallahassee Wildcats.

== College career ==
Reid played under coach Leonard Hamilton for the Florida State Seminoles, who played in the Atlantic Coast Conference in the National Collegiate Athletic Association (NCAA) Division I. As a freshman, he played in all 35 games off the bench, averaging 2.9 points on 56.2 percent shooting and 3.2 rebounds in 16.1 minutes per game. In his sophomore season, he started 21 games and played a total of 25 games for the Seminoles. He improved his performance and averaged 5.6 points on 53.1 percent shooting and 5.0 rebounds in 24.1 minutes per game. He helped the Seminoles to the National Invitation Tournament (NIT) tournament in both years.

Reid played 35 games in his junior year, averaging 4.9 points on 44.0 percent shooting and 3.7 rebounds in 19.1 minutes per game. In his final year at college, Reid was named as the team captain. He played in 31 games and averaged 6.8 points on 49.1 percent shooting and 4.0 rebounds in 22.7 minutes per game. He helped the Seminoles to the NCAA championships in his junior and senior seasons. Despite his low scoring and rebounding numbers, his biggest contribution for the Seminoles came at the defensive end. He became one of the best defenders in the college and successfully defended top opposing players. He became one of only three players in the Seminoles history to reach the postseason in all four years. Reid, who helped the Seminoles to 88 wins, also had more wins than any other player in school history. He finished his college career with 126 games with 5.0 points per game and 3.7 rebounds per game average. He graduated with a bachelor's degree in social science on May 1, 2010, and became the first person in his family to earn a college degree.

== Professional career ==
Reid was automatically eligible for the 2010 NBA draft after finishing his four-year college eligibility. The Oklahoma City Thunder were the only NBA team that sought to see him play or practice before the draft. He was eventually drafted by the Indiana Pacers with the 57th pick in the draft and his rights were immediately traded to the Thunder in exchange for the rights to Magnum Rolle, the 51st pick. His selection was considered a surprise in the draft because some analysts did not even consider him as a top-100 prospect for the draft. Nevertheless, the Thunder was already impressed with Reid's defensive abilities and work ethic and decided to take a chance on him.

He played for the Thunder in the 2010 Orlando Summer League. He played in four games, averaging 8.3 points and 3.8 rebounds in 16.0 minutes per game. However, he did not receive a contract offer or an invitation to the Thunder's training camp for the 2010–11 season. On November 26, 2010, he was acquired by the Tulsa 66ers, the D-League affiliate of the Thunder. His rights in the NBA were still held by the Thunder. Hence, the Thunder was the only team allowed to call up Reid to the NBA during the 2010–11 season. He averaged 8.5 points on 50.3 percent shooting and 5.8 rebounds per game in 48 games with the 66ers.

He returned to the 66ers for the 2011–12 season. After playing 8 games and averaging 11.8 points and 8.9 rebounds per game, he was called up to the Thunder training camp roster on December 13, 2011. On January 16, 2012, Reid returned to the 66ers on assignment from the Thunder. He was recalled on February 6, 2012.

On March 16, 2012, Reid was reassigned to the 66ers. He was recalled and then waived on March 21, 2012. He then returned to the 66ers on March 23, 2012.

On November 17, 2014, he signed with SLUC Nancy of the LNB Pro A.

On February 14, 2018, he signed with the St. John's Edge of NBL Canada.

== Death ==
Ryan Reid died following a medical emergency on July 9, 2025, at the age of 38.

== Career statistics ==
Legend
GP	Games played	GS	Games started	MPG	Minutes per game
FG%	Field goal percentage	3P%	3-point field goal percentage	FT%	Free throw percentage
RPG	Rebounds per game	APG	Assists per game	SPG	Steals per game
BPG	Blocks per game	PPG	Points per game	**Bold**	Career high

=== NBA ===
Year	Team	GP	GS	MPG	FG%	3P%	FT%	RPG	APG	SPG	BPG	PPG
2011–12	Oklahoma City	5	0	3.4	.800	–	–	.4	.0	.0	.0	1.6
Career		5	0	3.4	.800	–	–	.4	.0	.0	.0	1.6
