= 2012 NBA All-Star Game =

Exhibition basketball game

	1	2	3	4	Total
West	39	49	36	28	152
East	28	41	43	37	149
- Date: February 26, 2012
- Arena: Amway Center
- City: Orlando
- MVP: Kevin Durant
- National anthem: Mary J. Blige (US); Neverest (Canadian)
- Halftime show: Pitbull, Ne-Yo, Nayer, Chris Brown
- Attendance: 17,125
- Network: TNT
- Announcers: Marv Albert, Steve Kerr and Reggie Miller; Kevin Harlan, Reggie Miller, Mike Fratello, Charles Barkley, Kenny Smith and Shaquille O'Neal (All-Star Saturday Night); Kevin Harlan and Kenny Smith (Rising Stars Challenge)
West	East

NBA All-Star Game
< 2011	2013 >

The 2012 NBA All-Star Game was an exhibition basketball game that was played on February 26, 2012, during the National Basketball Association's (NBA) 2011–12 season. It was the 61st edition of the NBA All-Star Game, and was played at the Amway Center in Orlando, Florida, home of the Orlando Magic. The Western Conference defeated the Eastern Conference, 152–149. Kevin Durant was named the All-Star Game Most Valuable Player.

The Orlando Magic were awarded the All-Star Game in an announcement by commissioner David Stern on May 4, 2010. This was also the second time that Orlando has hosted the All-Star Game; the city had previously hosted the event in 1992 in the Orlando Arena, the Magic's previous home arena. Despite the 2011 NBA lockout, which reduced the regular season to sixty-six games on a condensed schedule, the All-Star Game took place as scheduled.

The All-Star Weekend began on Friday, February 24, 2012, with the Celebrity Game and the Rising Stars Challenge, a game featuring the league's best rookies and second-year players. On Saturday, the event continued with the All-Star Saturday Night, which featured the Shooting Stars Competition, Skills Challenge, Three-Point Shootout and Slam Dunk Contest. The D-League All-Star Game and the D-League Dream Factory, which includes the Slam Dunk Contest, Three-Point Shootout and Shooting Stars Competition, also took place during the All-Star Weekend. Both events were held on Saturday before the NBA All-Star Saturday Night.

== All-Star Game ==
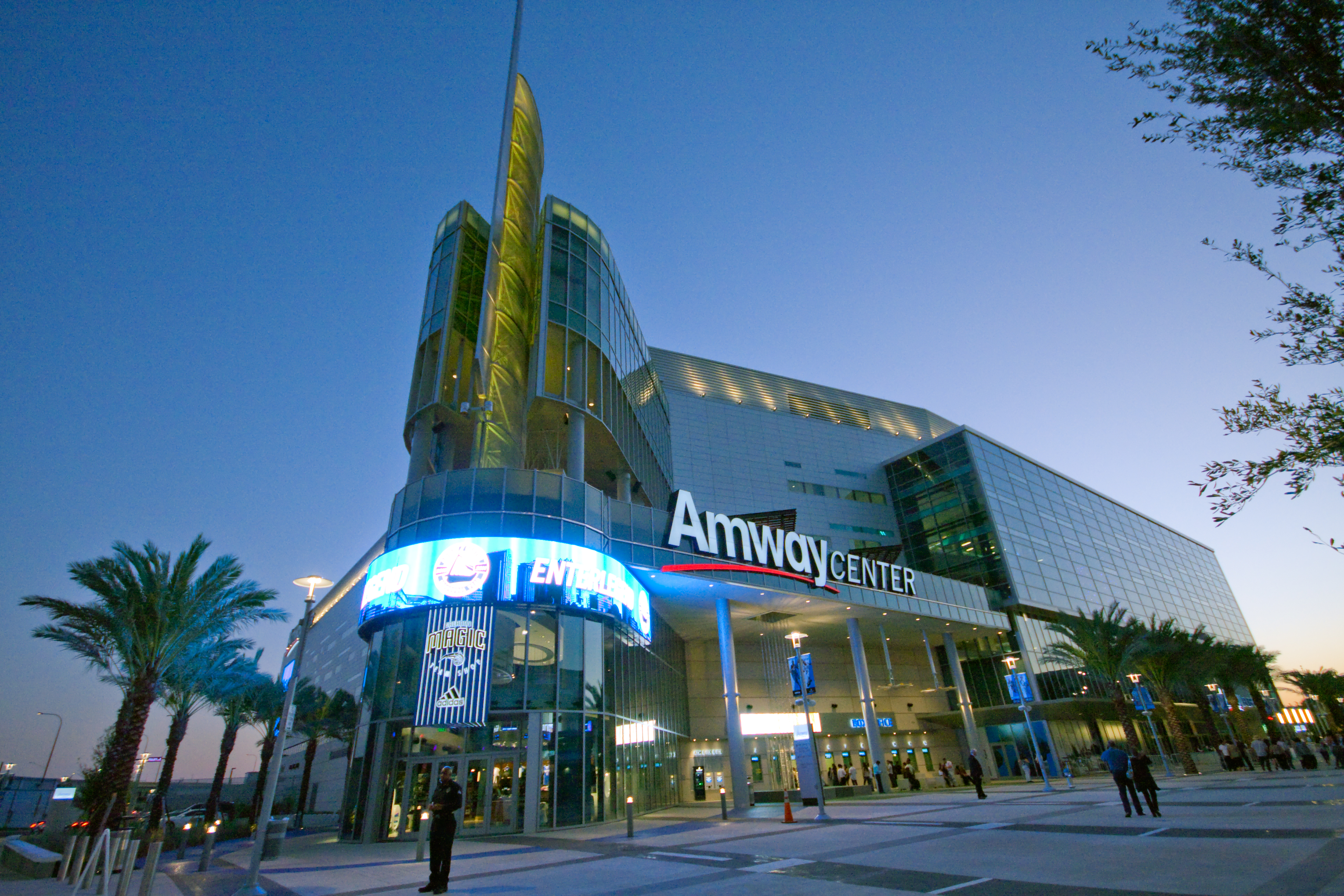
The event was held at the Amway Center in Orlando, Florida.

=== Coaches ===
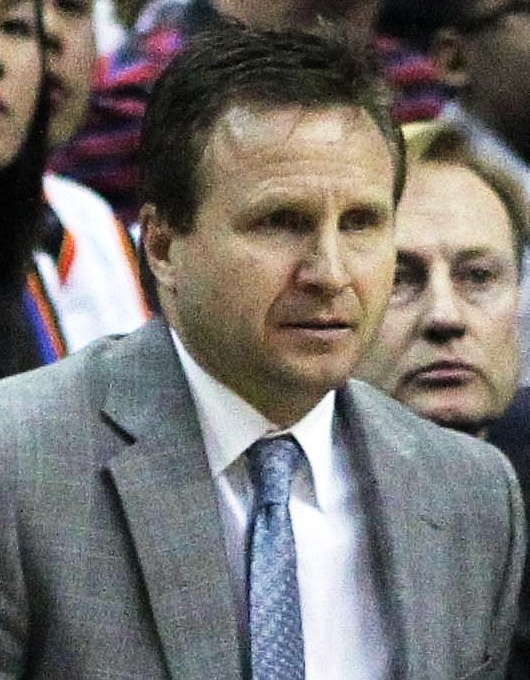
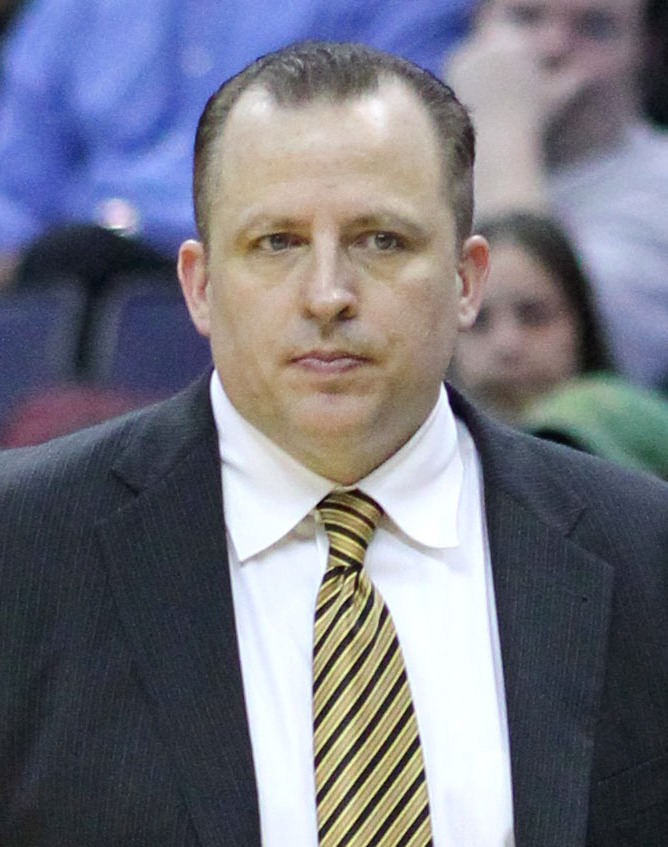
Scott Brooks (left) and Tom Thibodeau were selected as the West and East head coach, respectively.

The coaches for the All-Star game are the head coaches who led the teams with the best winning percentages in their conference through the games of February 15, 2012. The head coaches from the previous year, Doc Rivers and Gregg Popovich were not eligible for selection.

The coach for the Western Conference team was Oklahoma City Thunder head coach Scott Brooks. The Thunder had a 22–7 record on February 15, the best record in the Western Conference. The coach for the Eastern Conference team was Chicago Bulls head coach Tom Thibodeau. The Bulls had a 23–7 record on February 15, the best record in the Eastern Conference and in the league. This was the first All-Star Game selection for both Brooks and Thibodeau.

=== Players ===
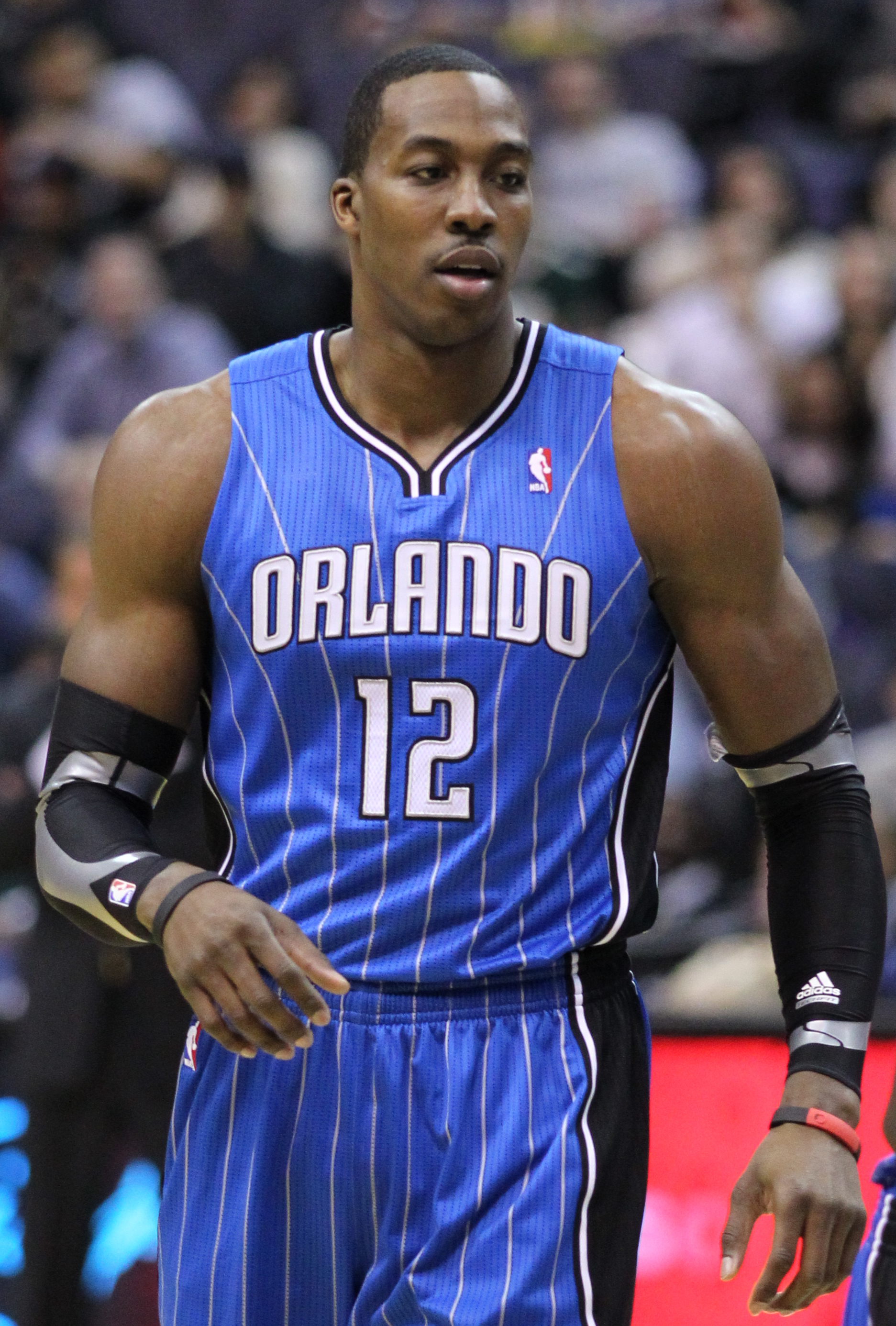
Dwight Howard received the most votes by fans, to be the leading vote-getter.

The rosters for the All-Star Game were chosen in two ways. The starters were chosen via a fan ballot. Two guards, two forwards and one center who received the highest vote were named the All-Star starters. The reserves were chosen by votes among the NBA head coaches in their respective conferences. The coaches were not permitted to vote for their own players. The reserves consist of two guards, two forwards, one center and two players regardless of position. If a player is unable to participate due to injury, the commissioner will select a replacement.

Dwight Howard of the Orlando Magic topped the ballots with 1,600,390 votes, which earned him a starting position as a center in the Eastern Conference team. Derrick Rose, Dwyane Wade, LeBron James, and Carmelo Anthony completed the Eastern Conference starting position. Howard, Rose, Wade and James were starters for the previous year's Eastern Conference team, while Anthony started for the Western Conference team. The Eastern Conference reserves includes three first-time selections, Luol Deng, Andre Iguodala, and Roy Hibbert. Atlanta Hawks guard Joe Johnson suffered an injury and was replaced by Boston Celtics guard Rajon Rondo. The Miami Heat is represented by three players, Wade, James and Chris Bosh, while the Chicago Bulls and the Celtics are represented by two players each.

The Western Conference's leading vote-getter was Kobe Bryant, who earned his fourteenth consecutive All-Star Game selection with 1,555,479 votes. Chris Paul, Kevin Durant, Blake Griffin, and Andrew Bynum completed the Western Conference starting positions. Bryant, Paul and Durant were starters for the previous year's Western Conference team. Griffin became an All-Star Game starter for the first time after he was selected as a reserve in last year's game. Bynum received 1,051,945 votes to earn his first All-Star Game selection and a starting position at center. Bryant/Bynum and Paul/Griffin became the first two pair of teammates who were voted to start for one conference since the 1997 game. The Western Conference reserves include two other first-time selections, LaMarcus Aldridge and Marc Gasol. Both Los Angeles teams, the Lakers and the Los Angeles Clippers, are represented by two players each, all of them are starters. Durant, of the Oklahoma City Thunder, is the only Western Conference starter that does not play in either teams of Los Angeles. The Thunder is also represented by two players, Durant and Russell Westbrook.

=== Roster ===
Western Conference All-Stars
Pos	Player	Team	No. of selections	Votes
Starters
G	Chris Paul	Los Angeles Clippers	5	1,138,743
G	Kobe Bryant	Los Angeles Lakers	14	1,555,479
F	Kevin Durant	Oklahoma City Thunder	3	1,345,566
F	Blake Griffin	Los Angeles Clippers	2	1,200,560
C	Andrew Bynum	Los Angeles Lakers	1	1,051,945
Reserves
F	LaMarcus Aldridge	Portland Trail Blazers	1	—
C	Marc Gasol	Memphis Grizzlies	1	—
F	Kevin Love	Minnesota Timberwolves	2	—
G	Steve Nash	Phoenix Suns	8	—
F	Dirk Nowitzki	Dallas Mavericks	11	—
G	Tony Parker	San Antonio Spurs	4	—
G	Russell Westbrook	Oklahoma City Thunder	2	—
Head coach: Scott Brooks (Oklahoma City Thunder)

Eastern Conference All-Stars
Pos	Player	Team	No. of selections	Votes
Starters
G	Derrick Rose	Chicago Bulls	3	1,514,723
G	Dwyane Wade	Miami Heat	8	1,334,223
F	LeBron James	Miami Heat	8	1,360,680
F	Carmelo Anthony	New York Knicks	5	1,041,290
C	Dwight Howard	Orlando Magic	6	1,600,390
Reserves
F	Chris Bosh	Miami Heat	7	—
F	Luol Deng	Chicago Bulls	1	—
C	Roy Hibbert	Indiana Pacers	1	—
F/G	Andre Iguodala	Philadelphia 76ers	1	—
G	Joe Johnson^{INJ}	Atlanta Hawks	6	—
F	Paul Pierce	Boston Celtics	10	—
G	Rajon Rondo^{REP}	Boston Celtics	3	—
G	Deron Williams	New Jersey Nets	3	—
Head coach: Tom Thibodeau (Chicago Bulls)

^INJ Joe Johnson was unable to participate due to injury.
^REP Rajon Rondo was named as Joe Johnson's replacement.

=== Game ===
TNT

February 26, 2012
7:30 p.m. ET

Boxscore

Western Conference 152, Eastern Conference 149
Scoring by quarter: 39–28, 49–41, 36–43, 28–37
Pts: Kevin Durant 36; Rebs: Blake Griffin 8 Asts: Chris Paul 12	Pts: LeBron James 36; Rebs: Dwight Howard, Dwyane Wade 10 each Asts: Dwyane Wade 10

Amway Center, Orlando, Florida
Attendance: 17,125
Referees:
- #55 Bill Kennedy
- #31 Scott Wall
- #20 Leroy Richardson

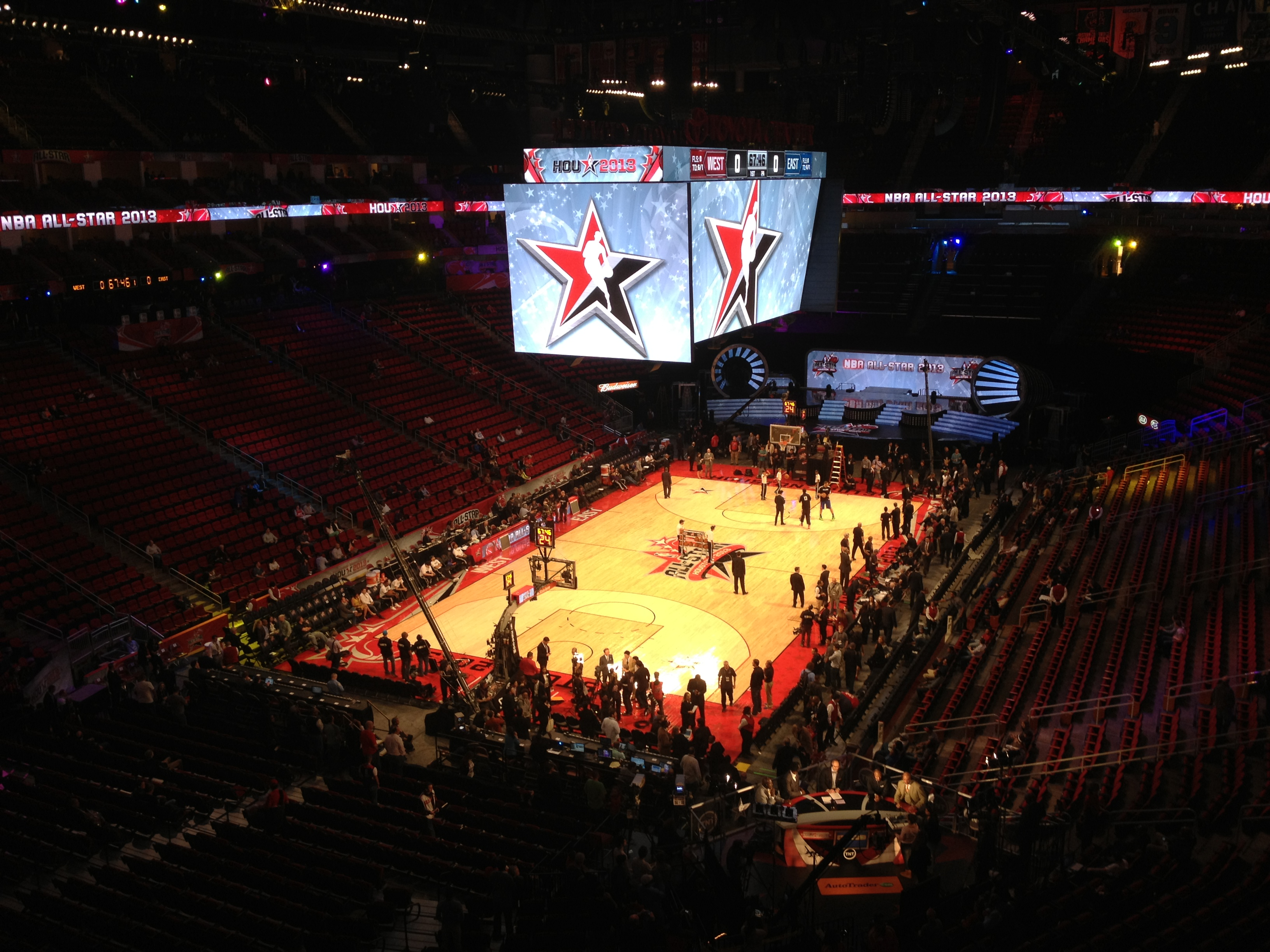
Toyota Center prior to the game's tip-off

The West led by as many as 21 points and held on to win the game, 152–149. Kevin Durant scored 34 of his game-high 36 points in the first three quarters and was named the game's Most Valuable Player. LeBron James also scored 36. The West's lead was reduced to one point at 148–147 after a Deron Williams' steal and layup with 1:44 remaining. Leading 151–149, Blake Griffin secured the victory by intercepting James' pass. Griffin was fouled and made one of two free throws with 1.1 seconds left. Kobe Bryant was guarding James on the play and chastised James for not attempting the potential game-winning shot. Bryant left the game earlier in the third quarter after he was bloodied from a hard foul to his face by Dwyane Wade. He was diagnosed after the game with a broken nose and a concussion.

Bryant finished with 27 points and became the leading scorer in All-Star history (271), passing Michael Jordan (262). Wade had 24 points, 10 rebounds, and 10 assists, joining James and Jordan as the only players to record a triple-double in the All-Star game. The West set an All-Star record with 88 first-half points, and the teams' 157 combined points at the half was also a record. The 301 combined points at the end of the game were two shy of the record set (in overtime) in the 1987 NBA All-Star Game. The East made 14 three-point field goals, another record.

== All-Star Weekend ==
=== BBVA Rising Stars Challenge ===
The BBVA Rising Stars Challenge featured the best first-year players ('Rookies') and the best second-year players ('Sophomores') going at each other. The game was divided into two twenty-minute halves, similar to college basketball. For this edition of the Rising Stars Challenge, a pool of the participating players was selected by the league's assistant coaches. Then, the teams were drafted by former NBA players and current TNT analysts Shaquille O'Neal and Charles Barkley, who serve as "General Managers" for their respective teams. Former NBA player and current TNT analyst Kenny Smith served as the "Honorary Commissioner" for the Rising Stars Challenge. Sophomore Jeremy Lin of the New York Knicks and rookie Norris Cole of the Miami Heat were two last-minute additions to the player pool. Sophomore Derrick Favors of the Utah Jazz was selected as an injury replacement for Tiago Splitter. Lin played only nine minutes in the game, at his request, due to exhaustion from his rise to stardom that month.

Team Shaq
Round	Pick	Pos.	Player	Team	Rookie / Sophomore
1	1	F	Blake Griffin	Los Angeles Clippers	Sophomore
2	3	G	Jeremy Lin	New York Knicks	Sophomore
3	5	G	Ricky Rubio	Minnesota Timberwolves	Rookie
4	7	F/C	Greg Monroe	Detroit Pistons	Sophomore
5	9	F	Markieff Morris	Phoenix Suns	Rookie
6	11	G	Kemba Walker	Charlotte Bobcats	Rookie
7	13	G	Landry Fields	New York Knicks	Sophomore
8	15	G	Norris Cole	Miami Heat	Rookie
Draw		G	Brandon Knight	Detroit Pistons	Rookie
Draw		F	Tristan Thompson	Cleveland Cavaliers	Rookie
Co-head coach: Ron Adams (Chicago Bulls)
Co-head coach: Steve Kerr
General manager: Shaquille O'Neal

Team Chuck
Round	Pick	Pos.	Player	Team	Rookie / Sophomore
1	2	G	Kyrie Irving	Cleveland Cavaliers	Rookie
2	4	C	DeMarcus Cousins	Sacramento Kings	Sophomore
3	6	G/F	Paul George	Indiana Pacers	Sophomore
4	8	F	Derrick Williams	Minnesota Timberwolves	Rookie
5	10	G/F	MarShon Brooks	New Jersey Nets	Rookie
6	12	G	John Wall	Washington Wizards	Sophomore
7	14	F	Gordon Hayward	Utah Jazz	Sophomore
8	16	F/C	Tiago Splitter^{INJ}	San Antonio Spurs	Sophomore
Draw		F	Kawhi Leonard^{DNP}	San Antonio Spurs	Rookie
Draw		G/F	Evan Turner	Philadelphia 76ers	Sophomore
–		F	Derrick Favors^{REP}	Utah Jazz	Sophomore
Co-head coach: Maurice Cheeks (Oklahoma City Thunder)
Co-head coach: Mike Fratello
General manager: Charles Barkley

^INJ Tiago Splitter was unable to participate due to injury.
^REP Derrick Favors was named Tiago Splitter's replacement.
^DNP Kawhi Leonard did not play due to injury.

TNT

February 24
9:00 p.m. ET

Boxscore

Team Shaq 133, Team Chuck 146
Scoring by half: 65–77, 68–69
Pts: Tristan Thompson 20; Rebs: Greg Monroe 10; Asts: Kemba Walker 10	Pts: Kyrie Irving 34; Rebs: Cousins, Turner 11 each Asts: Kyrie Irving 9

Amway Center, Orlando, Florida
Attendance: 17,125
Referees:
- #75 Eric Dalen
- #68 Marat Kogut
- #35 Kane Fitzgerald

Kyrie Irving, who scored 34 points on 8/8 three-point shooting, won the MVP award of the Rising Stars Challenge.

=== Sprite Slam Dunk Contest ===
Contestants
Pos.	Player	Team	Height	Weight	Pct
F	Chase Budinger	Houston Rockets	6–7	218	28%
F	Jeremy Evans^{REP}	Utah Jazz	6–9	194	29%
G/F	Paul George	Indiana Pacers	6–8	215	
F	Derrick Williams	Minnesota Timberwolves	6–8	241	
G	Iman Shumpert^{INJ}	New York Knicks	6–5	220	

^INJ Iman Shumpert was unable to participate due to injury.
^REP Jeremy Evans was named Iman Shumpert's replacement.

=== Foot Locker Three-Point Contest ===
Contestants
Pos.	Player	Team	Height	Weight	First round	Tiebreaker (24 seconds)	Final round	Tiebreaker (60 seconds)
F	Kevin Love	Minnesota Timberwolves	6–10	260	18	5	16	17
F	Kevin Durant^{REP}	Oklahoma City Thunder	6–9	235	20	—	16	14
F	James Jones	Miami Heat	6–8	215	22	—	12	—
G	Mario Chalmers	Miami Heat	6–2	190	18	4	—	
F	Ryan Anderson	Orlando Magic	6–10	240	17	—		
G	Anthony Morrow	New Jersey Nets	6–5	210	14	—		
G	Joe Johnson^{INJ}	Atlanta Hawks	6–7	240	—			

^INJ Joe Johnson was unable to participate due to injury.
^REP Kevin Durant was named as Joe Johnson's replacement.

=== Taco Bell Skills Challenge ===
Contestants
Pos.	Player	Team	Height	Weight	First round	Final round
G	Tony Parker	San Antonio Spurs	6–2	180	29.2	32.8
G	Rajon Rondo^{REP}	Boston Celtics	6–1	186	32.8	34.6
G	Deron Williams	New Jersey Nets	6–3	209	28.3	41.4
G	John Wall	Washington Wizards	6–4	195	32.8	—
G	Russell Westbrook	Oklahoma City Thunder	6–3	187	33.8	—
G	Kyrie Irving	Cleveland Cavaliers	6–3	191	42.2	—
G	Stephen Curry^{INJ}	Golden State Warriors	6–3	185	—	

^INJ Stephen Curry was unable to participate due to injury.
^REP Rajon Rondo was named as Curry's replacement.

=== Haier Shooting Stars Competition ===
Contestants
City/State	Members	Team	First round	Final round
New York	Landry Fields	New York Knicks	38.7	37.3
New York	Cappie Pondexter	New York Liberty	38.7	37.3
New York	Allan Houston	New York Knicks (retired)	38.7	37.3
Texas	Chandler Parsons	Houston Rockets	42.7	47.6
Texas	Sophia Young	San Antonio Silver Stars	42.7	47.6
Texas	Kenny Smith	Houston Rockets (retired)	42.7	47.6
Atlanta	Jerry Stackhouse^{REP}	Atlanta Hawks	55.3	—
Atlanta	Lindsey Harding	Atlanta Dream	55.3	—
Atlanta	Steve Smith	Atlanta Hawks (retired)	55.3	—
Atlanta	Joe Johnson^{INJ}	Atlanta Hawks	55.3	—
Orlando	Jameer Nelson	Orlando Magic	1:04	—
Orlando	Marie Ferdinand-Harris	Phoenix Mercury	1:04	—
Orlando	Dennis Scott	Orlando Magic (retired)	1:04	—

^INJ Joe Johnson was unable to participate due to injury.
^REP Jerry Stackhouse was named as Joe Johnson's replacement.
