= Lazar Hayward =

American basketball player (born 1986)

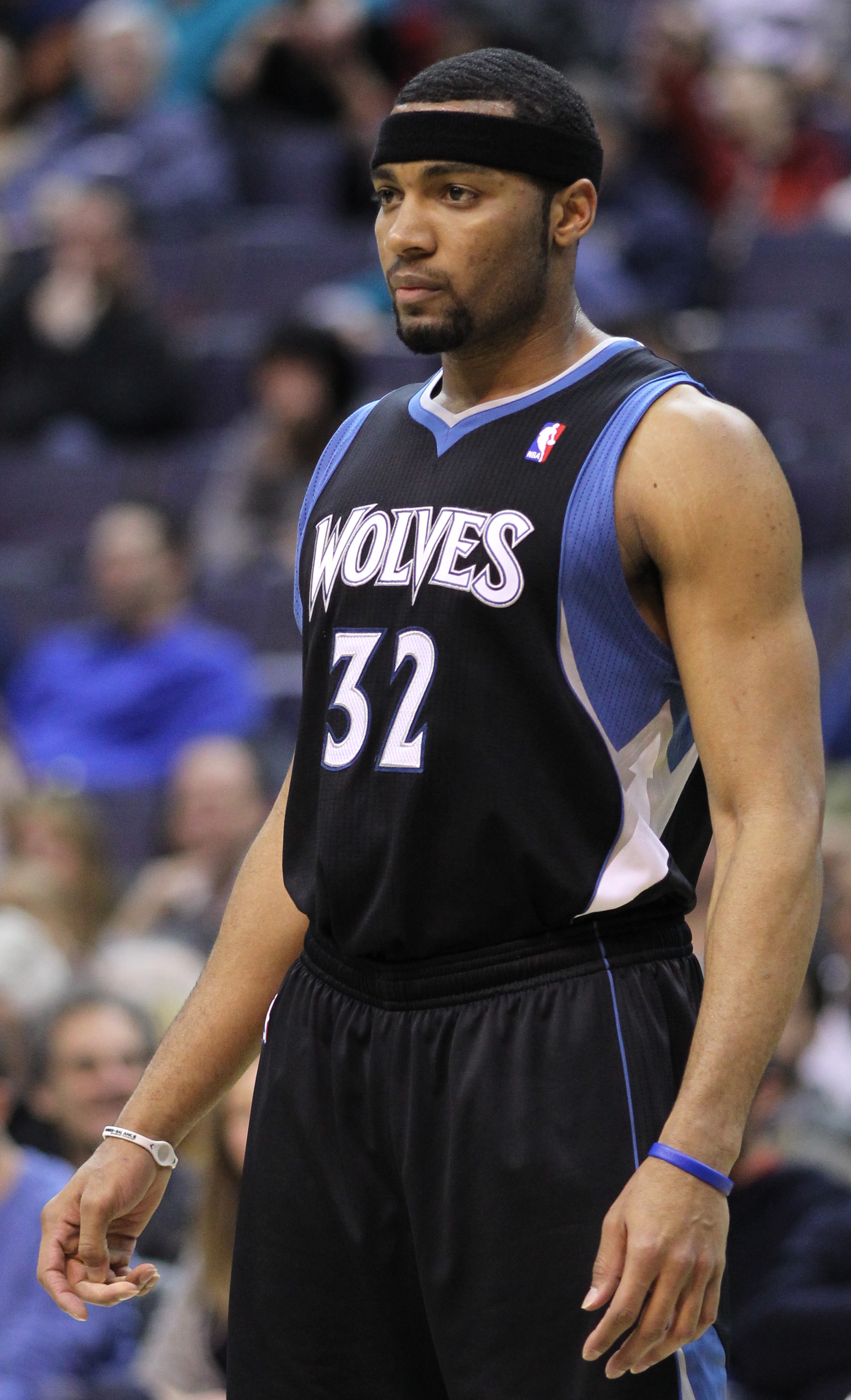
- Hayward with the Minnesota Timberwolves in 2011

Personal information
- Born: November 26, 1986 (age 39) Buffalo, New York, U.S.
- Listed height: 6 ft 6 in (1.98 m)
- Listed weight: 225 lb (102 kg)

Career information
- High school: Buffalo Traditional (Buffalo, New York); Notre Dame Prep (Fitchburg, Massachusetts)
- College: Marquette (2006–2010)
- NBA draft: 2010: 1st round, 30th overall pick
- Drafted by: Washington Wizards
- Playing career: 2010–2017
- Position: Small forward / shooting guard
- Number: 32, 11

Career history
- 2010–2011: Minnesota Timberwolves
- 2011–2012: Oklahoma City Thunder
- 2012: →Tulsa 66ers
- 2012–2013: Minnesota Timberwolves
- 2013, 2016: Los Angeles D-Fenders
- 2016–2017: Long Island Nets
- 2017: Guaros de Lara

Career highlights
- 2× Second-team All-Big East (2008, 2010)
- Stats at NBA.com
- Stats at Basketball Reference
Medals
Men's basketball
Representing United States
Summer Universiade
Bronze medal – third place	2009 Belgrade	Team competition

Lazar Miller Hayward (born November 26, 1986) is an American former professional basketball player. He was a college standout for the Marquette Golden Eagles.

== High school career ==
Hayward went to Buffalo Traditional High School where he was an outstanding basketball player. After graduating from Buffalo Traditional in 2004, Hayward enrolled in Notre Dame Prep School in Fitchburg, Massachusetts, as only the NCAA Division III college SUNY Fredonia expressed any interest in Hayward.

Hayward attended Notre Dame Prep School in Fitchburg, Massachusetts, and while he attended he played with many other notable players, like Michael Beasley, Syracuse University standout Paul Harris and UTEP player Derrick Caracter. Hayward started both freshman and sophomore seasons.

Considered a four-star recruit by Rivals.com, Hayward was listed as the No. 18 small forward and the No. 73 player in the nation in 2006.

== College career ==
At Marquette University, Hayward received the nickname "Money Man". He finished his Marquette career as the program's 3rd all-time leading scorer and 5th all time in rebounds, as well as garnering 2nd-Team All-Big East honors in 2008 and 2010 and Honorable Mention AP All-American status in 2010 while leading Marquette to 4 NCAA Tournament appearances. On April 2, 2010, Hayward was named the Hershey's Player of the Game in the Reese's College All-Star Game.

== Professional career ==
=== Minnesota Timberwolves (2010–2011) ===
On June 25, 2010, Hayward was selected by the Washington Wizards with the 30th pick in the 2010 NBA draft, but his draft rights were traded to the Minnesota Timberwolves shortly after being drafted. In 2011, his college teammate Jimmy Butler was taken with the same pick in the NBA draft. It was the first time Marquette players went back-to-back in the first round since Bo Ellis was drafted by Washington in 1977 and Butch Lee was taken by Atlanta in 1978. In his first season in the NBA, he averaged 3.8 points in 10 minutes per game for the Timberwolves.

=== Oklahoma City Thunder (2011–2012) ===
On December 13, 2011, before the start of another season, Hayward was traded to the Oklahoma City Thunder for two second-round draft picks and Robert Vaden.

The Thunder assigned Hayward to the Tulsa 66ers of the D-League on March 2, 2012. The Thunder recalled him on March 4, 2012, after he averaged 28 ppg in 2 games with the Tulsa 66ers. With the Thunder that season, he averaged 1.4 points per game, shooting 34% from the field. Hayward reached the 2012 NBA Finals with the Thunder, but the team lost to the Miami Heat.

=== Return to Minnesota (2012–2013) ===
On October 27, 2012, Hayward was traded to the Houston Rockets and subsequently waived. On December 31, 2012, Hayward re-signed with the Timberwolves. He was waived by the Timberwolves on January 6, 2013, but re-signed two days later on a 10-day contract.

=== Los Angeles D-Fenders (2013; 2016) ===
After the 10-day contract expired, Hayward joined the Los Angeles D-Fenders of the NBA Development League. He was waived by the D-Fenders on April 4, 2013, after sustaining an injury.

In September 2013, Hayward signed with the New Orleans Pelicans. He was later waived by the Pelicans on October 13, 2013.

On January 29, 2016, Hayward was reacquired by the Los Angeles D-Fenders.

=== Long Island Nets (2016–2017) ===
On November 1, 2016, Hayward was acquired by the Long Island Nets after previously acquiring his rights through the expansion draft. On February 8, 2017, Hayward was waived by the Nets. In 20 games, he averaged 12.5 points, 5.9 rebounds and 1.4 steals in 24.3 minutes.

=== Guaros de Lara (2017) ===
On February 11, 2017, Hayward signed with the Guaros de Lara of the LPB.

== NBA career statistics ==
Legend
GP	Games played	GS	Games started	MPG	Minutes per game
FG%	Field goal percentage	3P%	3-point field goal percentage	FT%	Free throw percentage
RPG	Rebounds per game	APG	Assists per game	SPG	Steals per game
BPG	Blocks per game	PPG	Points per game	**Bold**	Career high

=== Regular season ===
Year	Team	GP	GS	MPG	FG%	3P%	FT%	RPG	APG	SPG	BPG	PPG
2010–11	Minnesota	**42**	0	**10.0**	**.357**	.283	.786	**1.7**	.7	.3	**.2**	**3.8**
2011–12	Oklahoma City	26	0	5.4	.342	**.286**	.583	.6	.2	.1	.0	1.4
2012–13	Minnesota	4	0	7.8	.200	.000	**1.000**	1.0	**.8**	**.5**	.0	2.5
Career		72	0	8.2	.347	.269	.767	1.3	.5	.2	.1	2.9

=== Playoffs ===
Year	Team	GP	GS	MPG	FG%	3P%	FT%	RPG	APG	SPG	BPG	PPG
2012	Oklahoma City	5	0	3.6	.667	.000	.000	.8	.0	.0	.0	.8
Career		5	0	3.6	.667	.000	.000	.8	.0	.0	.0	.8

== See also ==
- 2010 NCAA Men's Basketball All-Americans
