= List of 2012–13 NBA season transactions =

This is a list of all personnel changes for the 2012 NBA off-season and 2012–13 NBA season.

== Retirement ==
Date	Name	Team(s) played (years)	Age	Notes	Ref.
June 27	Anthony Parker	Philadelphia 76ers (1997–1999); Orlando Magic (1999–2000); Toronto Raptors (2006–2009); Cleveland Cavaliers (2009–2012)	37	Played in the Continental Basketball Association in 2000, as well as six seasons around Europe between 2000 and 2006.	
August 21	Eduardo Nájera	Dallas Mavericks (2000–2004); Golden State Warriors (2004–2005); Denver Nuggets (2005–2008); New Jersey Nets (2008–2010); Dallas Mavericks (2010); Charlotte Bobcats (2010–2012)	36	Eduardo Nájera is only the second NBA player who is Mexican-born (Horacio Llamas was the first) and was the first Mexican player to be drafted.	
August 28	Ime Udoka	Los Angeles Lakers (2004); New York Knicks (2006); Portland Trail Blazers (2006–2007); San Antonio Spurs (2007–2009, 2010–2011); Sacramento Kings (2009–2010)	35	Became an assistant coach at the San Antonio Spurs on August 28, 2012.	
August 30	Laron Profit	Washington Wizards (1999–2001, 2004–2005); Los Angeles Lakers (2005)	35	Was hired as an assistant coach for the Magic.	
September 6	Brian Scalabrine	New Jersey Nets (2001–2005); Boston Celtics (2005–2010); Chicago Bulls (2010–2012)	34	Brian Scalabrine went to the NBA Finals on four occasions: with the New Jersey Nets in 2002 and 2003, and with the Boston Celtics in 2008 and 2010; the Celtics won the Finals in 2008.	
September 11	Brad Miller	Charlotte Hornets (1998–2000); Chicago Bulls (2000–2002; 2009–2010); Indiana Pacers (2002–2003); Sacramento Kings (2003–2009); Houston Rockets (2010–2011); Minnesota Timberwolves (2011–2012)	36	Played in Italy in 1998. Was traded to the New Orleans Hornets and the Phoenix Suns before retiring for good.	
September 20	Keyon Dooling	Los Angeles Clippers (2000–2004); Miami Heat (2004–2005); Orlando Magic (2005–2008); New Jersey Nets (2008–2010); Milwaukee Bucks (2010–2011); Boston Celtics (2011–2012)	32	Was the first-ever vice president of the NBA's players' union.	
November 8	Mehmet Okur	Detroit Pistons (2002–2004); Utah Jazz (2004–2011); New Jersey Nets (2011–2012)	33	Won a champion with the Pistons in 2004. Also played in Turkey (1997–2002, 2011).	
January 25	Brian Cardinal	Detroit Pistons (2000–2002); Washington Wizards (2002); Golden State Warriors (2003–2004); Memphis Grizzlies (2004–2008); Minnesota Timberwolves (2008–2010); Dallas Mavericks (2010–2012)	36	Won a championship with the Mavericks in 2011. Also played in Spain (2002–2003).	
February 20	Luke Jackson	Cleveland Cavaliers (2004–2006); Los Angeles Clippers (2006–2007); Toronto Raptors (2007); Miami Heat (2008)	31	Played overseas and in the D-League. Was hired as head coach for Northwest Christian University.	
March 11	Tony Battie	Denver Nuggets (1997–1998); Boston Celtics (1998–2003); Cleveland Cavaliers (2003–2004); Orlando Magic (2004–2008); New Jersey Nets (2009–2010); Philadelphia 76ers (2010–2012)	37	Became an analyst for the Orlando Magic.	
March 30	Jerry Stackhouse	Philadelphia 76ers (1995–1998); Detroit Pistons (1998–2002); Washington Wizards (2002–2004); Dallas Mavericks (2004–2009); Milwaukee Bucks (2010); Miami Heat (2010); Atlanta Hawks (2011–2012); Brooklyn Nets (2012–2013)	38		
April 17	Rasheed Wallace	Washington Bullets (1995–1996); Portland Trail Blazers (1996–2004); Atlanta Hawks (2004); Detroit Pistons (2004–2009); Boston Celtics (2009–2010); New York Knicks (2012–2013)	38	Second retirement from basketball. First being in 2010.	

== Front office movements ==
=== Head coach changes ===
Off-season

Date	Team	Outgoing head coach	Reason for departure	Incoming head coach	Last coaching position	Ref.
June 20	Charlotte Bobcats	Paul Silas	Fired	Mike Dunlap	St. John's assistant coach (2010–2012)	
July 28	Orlando Magic	Stan Van Gundy	Fired	Jacque Vaughn	San Antonio Spurs assistant coach (2010–2012)	
August 7	Portland Trail Blazers	Kaleb Canales (interim)	Replaced, returned to assistant role	Terry Stotts	Dallas Mavericks assistant coach (2008–2012)	

Season

Date	Team	Outgoing head coach	Reason for departure	Incoming head coach	Last coaching position	Ref.
November 9	Los Angeles Lakers	Mike Brown	Fired	Bernie Bickerstaff (interim)	Los Angeles Lakers assistant coach (2012)	
November 12	Los Angeles Lakers	Bernie Bickerstaff (interim)	Replaced, returned to assistant role	Mike D'Antoni	New York Knicks head coach (2008–2012)	
December 27	Brooklyn Nets	Avery Johnson	Fired	P. J. Carlesimo (interim)	Brooklyn Nets assistant coach (2011–2012)	
January 8	Milwaukee Bucks	Scott Skiles	Quit	Jim Boylan (interim)	Milwaukee Bucks assistant coach (2008–2013)	
January 18	Phoenix Suns	Alvin Gentry	Quit	Lindsey Hunter (interim)	Phoenix Suns player development coach (2012–2013)	

=== General manager changes ===
Off-season

Date	Team	Outgoing general manager	Reason for departure	Incoming general manager	Last managerial position	Ref.
June 4	Portland Trail Blazers	Chad Buchanan	Interim GM, returned to director of college scouting role	Neil Olshey	Los Angeles Clippers general manager (2010–2012)	
June 20	Orlando Magic	Otis Smith	Fired	Rob Hennigan	Oklahoma City Thunder assistant general manager (2008–2012)	
June 25	Atlanta Hawks	Rick Sund	Contract expired	Danny Ferry	Cleveland Cavaliers general manager (2005–2010)	
June 27	Indiana Pacers	David Morway	Resigned	Kevin Pritchard	Portland Trail Blazers general manager (2007–2010)	
August 7	Utah Jazz	Kevin O’Connor	Returned to executive vice president of basketball operations role	Dennis Lindsey	San Antonio Spurs assistant general manager (2007–2012)	

== Player movement ==
The following is a list of player movement via free agency and trades.

=== Trades ===
June
June 20	To Washington Wizards: Trevor Ariza; Emeka Okafor	To New Orleans Hornets: Rashard Lewis; The 46th pick in 2012 (Darius Miller)
June 26	To Minnesota Timberwolves: Chase Budinger; Draft rights to Lior Eliyahu	To Houston Rockets: The 18th pick in 2012 (Terrence Jones)
June 26	To Charlotte Bobcats: Ben Gordon; Future first-round pick	To Detroit Pistons: Corey Maggette
June 27	To Houston Rockets: Jon Brockman; Jon Leuer; Shaun Livingston; The 12th pick in 2012 (Jeremy Lamb)	To Milwaukee Bucks: Samuel Dalembert; The 14th pick in 2012 (John Henson); Future second-round pick; Cash considerations
June 28 (draft-day trades)	To Dallas Mavericks: Draft rights to 24th pick Jared Cunningham; Draft rights to 33rd pick Bernard James; Draft rights to 34th pick Jae Crowder	To Cleveland Cavaliers: Draft rights to 17th pick Tyler Zeller; Kelenna Azubuike
June 28 (draft-day trades)	To Miami Heat: Draft rights to 45th pick Justin Hamilton; Future first-round pick	To Philadelphia 76ers: Draft rights to 27th pick Arnett Moultrie
June 28 (draft-day trades)	To Sacramento Kings: Cash considerations	To Indiana Pacers: Draft rights to 36th pick Orlando Johnson
June 28 (draft-day trades)	To Portland Trail Blazers: Cash considerations	To Brooklyn Nets: Draft rights to 41st pick Tyshawn Taylor
June 28 (draft-day trades)	To Philadelphia 76ers: Cash considerations	To Brooklyn Nets: Draft rights to 54th pick Tornike Shengelia
June 28 (draft-day trades)	To Dallas Mavericks: Cash considerations	To Los Angeles Lakers: Draft rights to 55th pick Darius Johnson-Odom
June 29	Four-team trade	
June 29	To Houston Rockets: Draft rights to 53rd pick Furkan Aldemir (from L.A. Clippers)	To Utah Jazz: Mo Williams (from L.A. Clippers); Draft rights to Shan Foster (from Dallas)
June 29	To Dallas Mavericks: Draft rights to Tadija Dragićević (from Utah); Cash considerations (from Houston)	To Los Angeles Clippers: Lamar Odom (from Dallas)
July
July 11	To Los Angeles Lakers: Steve Nash (sign and trade)	To Phoenix Suns: 2013 first-round pick (from L.A. Lakers or Miami); 2013 second-round pick (from L.A. Lakers via Denver); 2014 second-round pick; 2015 Los Angeles Lakers protected first-round pick; Cash considerations
July 11	To New Orleans Hornets: Ryan Anderson (sign and trade)	To Orlando Magic: Gustavo Ayón
July 11	To New York Knicks: Marcus Camby (sign and trade)	To Houston Rockets: Toney Douglas; Josh Harrellson; Jerome Jordan; 2014 second-round pick; 2015 second-round pick; Cash considerations
July 11	To Toronto Raptors: Kyle Lowry	To Houston Rockets: Gary Forbes; Future first-round pick
July 11	To Brooklyn Nets: Joe Johnson	To Atlanta Hawks: DeShawn Stevenson (sign and trade); Johan Petro; Jordan Farmar; Anthony Morrow; Jordan Williams; 2013 Houston first-round pick; 2017 Brooklyn second-round pick
July 11	To Brooklyn Nets: Reggie Evans (sign and trade)	To Los Angeles Clippers: Right to swap 2016 second-round draft picks
July 11	To Atlanta Hawks: Devin Harris	To Utah Jazz: Marvin Williams
July 11	Three-team trade	
July 11	To New Orleans Hornets: Draft rights to Edin Bavčić (from Philadelphia)	To Golden State Warriors: Jarrett Jack (from New Orleans)
July 11	To Philadelphia 76ers: Darryl Watkins (from New Orleans); Dorell Wright (from Golden State)	
July 12	To Dallas Mavericks: Dahntay Jones; Darren Collison	To Indiana Pacers: Ian Mahinmi (sign and trade)
July 13	To New Orleans Hornets: Brad Miller; 2013 Brooklyn second-round pick; 2016 Minnesota second-round pick; Cash considerations	To Minnesota Timberwolves: conditional second-round pick
July 16	To Sacramento Kings: James Johnson	To Toronto Raptors: 2014 second-round pick
July 16	To Portland Trail Blazers: Jared Jeffries (sign and trade); Dan Gadzuric; Draft rights to Kostas Papanikolaou; Draft rights to Georgios Printezis; Future protected second-round pick	To New York Knicks: Raymond Felton (sign and trade); Kurt Thomas
July 16	To Atlanta Hawks: Kyle Korver	To Chicago Bulls: Cash considerations
July 20	Three-team trade	
July 20	To Houston Rockets: JaJuan Johnson (from Boston); E'Twaun Moore (from Boston); Sean Williams (from Boston); 2013 second-round pick (from Boston); Draft rights to Jon Diebler (from Portland)	To Boston Celtics: Courtney Lee (from Houston) (sign and trade)
July 20	To Portland Trail Blazers: Sasha Pavlović (from Boston) (sign and trade); Two 2013 second-round picks (from Boston); Cash considerations (from Boston)	
July 24	To Memphis Grizzlies: Wayne Ellington	To Minnesota Timberwolves: Dante Cunningham
July 25	To Cleveland Cavaliers: Jeremy Pargo; 2014 Memphis second-round pick; Cash considerations	To Memphis Grizzlies: D. J. Kennedy
July 27	Three-team trade	
July 27	To New Orleans Hornets: Robin Lopez (from Phoenix) (sign and trade); Hakim Warrick (from Phoenix); Cash considerations (from Phoenix)	To Phoenix Suns: Jerome Dyson (from New Orleans); Brad Miller (from New Orleans); Wesley Johnson (from Minnesota); Future first round pick (from Minnesota or Memphis)
July 27	To Minnesota Timberwolves: 2013 Brooklyn second-round pick (from New Orleans); 2014 Los Angeles Lakers second-round pick (from Phoenix); 2016 Minnesota second-round pick (from New Orleans)	
July 30	To Los Angeles Clippers: Willie Green (sign and trade)	To Atlanta Hawks: Draft rights to Sofoklis Schortsanitis
August
August 10	Four-team trade	
August 10	To Los Angeles Lakers: Dwight Howard (from Orlando); Earl Clark (from Orlando); Chris Duhon (from Orlando)	To Denver Nuggets: Andre Iguodala (from Philadelphia)
August 10	To Philadelphia 76ers: Andrew Bynum (from L.A. Lakers); Jason Richardson (from Orlando)	To Orlando Magic: Arron Afflalo (from Denver); Al Harrington (from Denver); Nikola Vučević (from Philadelphia); Maurice Harkless (from Philadelphia); Josh McRoberts (from L.A. Lakers); Christian Eyenga (from L.A. Lakers); 2013 second-round pick (from Denver); 2014 first-round pick (from Denver or New York); 2015 conditional first-round pick (from Philadelphia); 2015 protected second-round pick (from L.A. Lakers); 2017 protected first-round pick (from L.A. Lakers)
October
October 27	To Houston Rockets: James Harden; Cole Aldrich; Daequan Cook; Lazar Hayward	To Oklahoma City Thunder: Kevin Martin; Jeremy Lamb; 2013 Top-3 protected first round pick (from Toronto); 2013 Top-20 protected first round pick (from Dallas); 2013 second round pick (from Charlotte)
November
November 13	To New Orleans Hornets: Matt Carroll	To Charlotte Bobcats: Hakim Warrick
January
January 22	To Cleveland Cavaliers: Marreese Speights; Josh Selby; Wayne Ellington; Future Memphis first-round draft pick (Note: The pick cannot be conveyed until two years after Memphis sends its first-round pick to Minnesota; the pick to Cleveland is protected 1-5 and 15-30 in 2015, 1-5 in 2017 and 2018)	To Memphis Grizzlies: Jon Leuer
January 30	Three-team trade	
January 30	To Detroit Pistons: José Calderón (from Toronto via Memphis)	To Memphis Grizzlies: Ed Davis (from Toronto); Austin Daye (from Detroit); Tayshaun Prince (from Detroit); 2013 second-round pick (from Toronto)
January 30	To Toronto Raptors: Rudy Gay (from Memphis); Hamed Haddadi (from Memphis)	
February
February 20	To Houston Rockets: Francisco García; Tyler Honeycutt; Thomas Robinson	To Sacramento Kings: Patrick Patterson; Cole Aldrich; Toney Douglas; Cash considerations
February 21	To Houston Rockets: 2013 Phoenix second-round pick	To Phoenix Suns: Marcus Morris
February 21	To Miami Heat: Trade exception; Rights to Ricky Sánchez	To Memphis Grizzlies: Dexter Pittman; 2013 second-round pick
February 21	To Phoenix Suns: Hamed Haddadi; 2014 protected second-round pick (Note: Phoenix will receive the worse of Toronto's and Sacramento's picks, subject to Toronto's pick being protected 31-36)	To Toronto Raptors: Sebastian Telfair
February 21	To Milwaukee Bucks: JJ Redick; Gustavo Ayón; Ish Smith	To Orlando Magic: Doron Lamb; Beno Udrih; Tobias Harris
February 21	To Oklahoma City Thunder: Rights to Georgios Printezis; Trade exception	To Portland Trail Blazers: Eric Maynor
February 21	To Oklahoma City Thunder: Ronnie Brewer	To New York Knicks: 2014 Oklahoma City second-round pick; Cash considerations
February 21	To Boston Celtics: Jordan Crawford	To Washington Wizards: Jason Collins; Leandro Barbosa
February 21	To Charlotte Bobcats: Josh McRoberts	To Orlando Magic: Hakim Warrick
February 21	To Atlanta Hawks: Dahntay Jones	To Dallas Mavericks: Anthony Morrow
February 21	To Atlanta Hawks: Jeremy Tyler	To Golden State Warriors: Cash considerations; Future draft considerations
February 21	To Philadelphia 76ers: Charles Jenkins	To Golden State Warriors: Future draft considerations

=== Free agency ===
Free agency negotiation started on July 1, 2012, with players being able to sign starting July 11, after the July moratorium ended. All players are unrestricted free agents unless indicated otherwise. A restricted free agent's team has the right to keep the player by matching an offer sheet the player signs with another team.

Player	Date signed	New team	Former team	Ref
Lavoy Allen (RFA)	July 11	Philadelphia 76ers		
Ray Allen	July 11	Miami Heat	Boston Celtics	
Ryan Anderson (RFA)	July 11	New Orleans Hornets (via sign and trade)	Orlando Magic	
Marcus Camby	July 11	New York Knicks (via sign and trade)	Houston Rockets	
Jamal Crawford	July 11	Los Angeles Clippers	Portland Trail Blazers	
Tim Duncan	July 11	San Antonio Spurs		
Jeremy Evans (RFA)	July 11	Utah Jazz		
Reggie Evans	July 11	Brooklyn Nets (via sign and trade)	Los Angeles Clippers	
Danny Green (RFA)	July 11	San Antonio Spurs		
Luke Harangody (RFA)	July 11	Cleveland Cavaliers		
Rashard Lewis	July 11	Miami Heat	Washington Wizards	
Brook Lopez (RFA)	July 11	Brooklyn Nets		
Andre Miller	July 11	Denver Nuggets		
Steve Nash	July 11	Los Angeles Lakers (via sign and trade)	Phoenix Suns	
J. R. Smith	July 11	New York Knicks		
DeShawn Stevenson	July 11	Atlanta Hawks (via sign and trade)	Brooklyn Nets	
Mirza Teletović	July 11	Brooklyn Nets	Caja Laboral (Spain)	
Hasheem Thabeet	July 11	Oklahoma City Thunder	Portland Trail Blazers	
Hollis Thompson	July 11	Oklahoma City Thunder	Georgetown (went undrafted in the 2012 draft)	
Jason Thompson (RFA)	July 11	Sacramento Kings		
Gerald Wallace	July 11	Brooklyn Nets		
James White	July 11	New York Knicks	Scavolini Pesaro (Italy)	
Deron Williams	July 11	Brooklyn Nets		
Boris Diaw	July 12	San Antonio Spurs		
Ersan İlyasova	July 12	Milwaukee Bucks		
Jason Kidd	July 12	New York Knicks	Dallas Mavericks	
Cartier Martin	July 12	Washington Wizards		
Ian Mahinmi	July 12	Indiana Pacers (via sign and trade)	Dallas Mavericks	
Steve Novak	July 12	New York Knicks		
Louis Williams	July 12	Atlanta Hawks	Philadelphia 76ers	
Nick Young	July 12	Philadelphia 76ers	Los Angeles Clippers	
Darrell Arthur (RFA)	July 13	Memphis Grizzlies		
D. J. Augustin	July 13	Indiana Pacers	Charlotte Bobcats	
Jerryd Bayless (RFA)	July 13	Memphis Grizzlies	Toronto Raptors	
Chauncey Billups	July 13	Los Angeles Clippers		
Elton Brand	July 13	Dallas Mavericks (claimed off waivers)	Philadelphia 76ers (waived on July 11)	
Gerald Green	July 13	Indiana Pacers	Brooklyn Nets	
Spencer Hawes	July 13	Philadelphia 76ers		
Roy Hibbert (RFA)	July 13	Indiana Pacers		
J. J. Hickson	July 13	Portland Trail Blazers		
George Hill (RFA)	July 13	Indiana Pacers		
Chris Kaman	July 13	Dallas Mavericks	New Orleans Hornets	
Patrick Mills (RFA)	July 13	San Antonio Spurs		
Ramon Sessions	July 13	Charlotte Bobcats	Los Angeles Lakers	
Marreese Speights (RFA)	July 13	Memphis Grizzlies		
Brandon Bass	July 14	Boston Celtics		
Kevin Garnett	July 14	Boston Celtics		
Eric Gordon (RFA)	July 14	New Orleans Hornets (matched offer sheet from Phoenix)		
Brendan Haywood	July 14	Charlotte Bobcats (claimed off waivers)	Dallas Mavericks (waived on July 12)	
Viacheslav Kravtsov	July 14	Detroit Pistons	Donetsk (Ukraine)	
Chris Wilcox	July 14	Boston Celtics		
Landry Fields (RFA)	July 15	Toronto Raptors	New York Knicks	
Luis Scola	July 15	Phoenix Suns (claimed off waivers)	Houston Rockets (waived on July 13)	
Raymond Felton	July 16	New York Knicks (via sign and trade)	Portland Trail Blazers	
Chris Copeland	July 16	New York Knicks	Generali Okapi Aalstar (Belgium)	
Jared Jeffries	July 16	Portland Trail Blazers (via sign and trade)	New York Knicks	
Jameer Nelson	July 16	Orlando Magic		
Jerry Stackhouse	July 16	Brooklyn Nets	Atlanta Hawks	
Aaron Brooks	July 16	Sacramento Kings	Guangdong Southern Tigers (China) (rights last owned by Phoenix)	
Kris Humphries	July 17	Brooklyn Nets		
Jeremy Lin (RFA)	July 17	Houston Rockets	New York Knicks	
Nicolas Batum (RFA)	July 18	Portland Trail Blazers (matched offer sheet from Minnesota)		
Grant Hill	July 18	Los Angeles Clippers	Phoenix Suns	
JaVale McGee (RFA)	July 18	Denver Nuggets		
Ronnie Price	July 18	Portland Trail Blazers	Phoenix Suns	
Jason Terry	July 18	Boston Celtics	Dallas Mavericks	
Goran Dragić	July 19	Phoenix Suns	Houston Rockets	
O. J. Mayo	July 19	Dallas Mavericks	Memphis Grizzlies	
Vladimir Radmanović	July 19	Chicago Bulls	Atlanta Hawks	
Keith Bogans	July 19	Brooklyn Nets		
Michael Beasley	July 20	Phoenix Suns	Minnesota Timberwolves	
Kwame Brown	July 20	Philadelphia 76ers	Milwaukee Bucks	
Courtney Lee	July 20	Boston Celtics (via sign and trade)	Houston Rockets	
Jon Leuer	July 20	Cleveland Cavaliers (claimed off waivers)	Houston Rockets (waived on July 18)	
Sasha Pavlović	July 20	Portland Trail Blazers (via sign and trade)	Boston Celtics	
Anthony Randolph	July 20	Denver Nuggets	Minnesota Timberwolves	
Kirk Hinrich	July 23	Chicago Bulls	Atlanta Hawks	
Ryan Hollins	July 23	Los Angeles Clippers	Boston Celtics	
C. J. Watson	July 23	Brooklyn Nets	Chicago Bulls	
Ömer Aşık (RFA)	July 24	Houston Rockets	Chicago Bulls	
Marco Belinelli	July 24	Chicago Bulls	New Orleans Hornets	
A. J. Price (RFA)	July 24	Washington Wizards	Indiana Pacers	
Pablo Prigioni	July 24	New York Knicks	Caja Laboral (Spain)	
Ronnie Brewer	July 25	New York Knicks	Chicago Bulls	
Shannon Brown	July 25	Phoenix Suns		
Randy Foye	July 25	Utah Jazz	Los Angeles Clippers	
Jordan Hill	July 25	Los Angeles Lakers		
Antawn Jamison	July 25	Los Angeles Lakers	Cleveland Cavaliers	
Alexey Shved	July 25	Minnesota Timberwolves	CSKA Moscow (Russia)	
Kent Bazemore	July 26	Golden State Warriors	Old Dominion (went undrafted in the 2012 draft)	
Delonte West	July 26	Dallas Mavericks		
Aaron Gray	July 27	Toronto Raptors		
Robin Lopez (RFA)	July 27	New Orleans Hornets (via sign and trade)	Phoenix Suns	
Andrei Kirilenko	July 27	Minnesota Timberwolves	CSKA Moscow (Russia) (rights last owned by Utah)	
John Lucas III	July 27	Toronto Raptors	Chicago Bulls	
Nazr Mohammed	July 27	Chicago Bulls	Oklahoma City Thunder	
Ronny Turiaf	July 27	Los Angeles Clippers	Miami Heat	
Royal Ivey	July 27	Philadelphia 76ers	Oklahoma City Thunder	
Hamed Haddadi	July 28	Memphis Grizzlies		
Alan Anderson	July 30	Toronto Raptors		
Willie Green	July 30	Los Angeles Clippers (via sign and trade)	Atlanta Hawks	
Dionte Christmas	July 31	Boston Celtics	Rethymno Aegean (Greece)	
Jason Collins	July 31	Boston Celtics	Atlanta Hawks	
Keyon Dooling	July 31	Boston Celtics		
Nate Robinson	July 31	Chicago Bulls	Golden State Warriors	
Brandon Roy	July 31	Minnesota Timberwolves	Retired (rights last owned by Portland)	
Jamar Smith	July 31	Boston Celtics	BK Prostějov (Czech Republic)	
Maalik Wayns	July 31	Philadelphia 76ers	Villanova (went undrafted in the 2012 draft)	
Carl Landry	August 1	Golden State Warriors	New Orleans Hornets	
Brandon Rush (RFA)	August 1	Golden State Warriors		
Chris Smith	August 1	New York Knicks	Louisville (went undrafted in the 2012 draft)	
P. J. Tucker	August 1	Phoenix Suns	Brose Baskets (Germany)	
Greg Stiemsma	August 2	Minnesota Timberwolves	Boston Celtics	
Roger Mason, Jr.	August 3	New Orleans Hornets	Washington Wizards	
Daniel Orton	August 4	Oklahoma City Thunder	Orlando Magic	
C. J. Miles	August 8	Cleveland Cavaliers	Utah Jazz	
Joel Przybilla	August 9	Milwaukee Bucks	Portland Trail Blazers	
Micheal Eric	August 10	Cleveland Cavaliers	Temple (went undrafted in the 2012 draft)	
Jodie Meeks	August 13	Los Angeles Lakers	Philadelphia 76ers	
Devin Ebanks	August 13	Los Angeles Lakers		
Carlos Delfino	August 15	Houston Rockets	Milwaukee Bucks	
Jermaine O'Neal	August 15	Phoenix Suns	Boston Celtics	
Ish Smith	August 15	Orlando Magic		
Brian Roberts	August 16	New Orleans Hornets	Brose Baskets (Germany)	
Jeff Green	August 22	Boston Celtics		
Martell Webster	August 29	Washington Wizards	Minnesota Timberwolves	
Greg Somogyi	September 5	Los Angeles Lakers	Santa Barbara Breakers (WCBL)	
Reeves Nelson	September 5	Los Angeles Lakers	Žalgiris Kaunas (Lithuania)	
E'Twaun Moore	September 6	Orlando Magic	Houston Rockets (waived on July 25)	
Sam Young	September 6	Indiana Pacers	Philadelphia 76ers	
Sundiata Gaines	September 6	Indiana Pacers	Brooklyn Nets	
Blake Ahearn	September 6	Indiana Pacers	Utah Jazz	
Mickell Gladness	September 7	Miami Heat	Golden State Warriors	
Scott Machado	September 7	Houston Rockets	Iona (went undrafted in the 2012 draft)	
Alonzo Gee	September 10	Cleveland Cavaliers		
Terrel Harris	September 11	Miami Heat		
Henry Sims	September 11	New York Knicks	Georgetown (went undrafted in the 2012 draft)	
Oscar Bellfield	September 11	New York Knicks	UNLV (went undrafted in the 2012 draft)	
John Shurna	September 11	New York Knicks	Northwestern (went undrafted in the 2012 draft)	
Mychel Thompson	September 11	New York Knicks	Erie BayHawks (D-League)	
DeAndre Liggins	September 12	Oklahoma City Thunder	Orlando Magic	
Andy Rautins	September 12	Oklahoma City Thunder	Lucentum Alicante (Spain)	
Andray Blatche	September 12	Brooklyn Nets	Washington Wizards (waived on July 17)	
Dominic McGuire	September 12	Toronto Raptors	Golden State Warriors	
Josh Childress	September 13	Brooklyn Nets	Phoenix Suns (waived on July 15)	
Garrett Temple	September 13	Miami Heat	Novipiù Casale Monferrato (Italy)	
Matt Barnes	September 14	Los Angeles Clippers	Los Angeles Lakers	
Stephen Dennis	September 17	Brooklyn Nets	Phantoms Braunschweig (Germany)	
Josh Harrellson	September 17	Miami Heat	Houston Rockets (waived on August 15)	
James Mays	September 17	Brooklyn Nets	Capitanes de Arecibo (Puerto Rico)	
Carleton Scott	September 17	Brooklyn Nets	UBC Carefuel Gussing Knights (Austria)	
Ivan Johnson	September 18	Atlanta Hawks		
Luke Nevill	September 18	Indiana Pacers	Perth Wildcats (Australia)	
Ben Hansbrough	September 18	Indiana Pacers	BC Krka (Slovenia)	
Jamaal Magloire	September 18	Toronto Raptors		
Brian Cook	September 19	Washington Wizards		
Earl Barron	September 19	Washington Wizards	Atléticos de San Germán (Puerto Rico)	
Steven Gray	September 19	Washington Wizards	BK Ventspils (Latvia)	
Shavlik Randolph	September 19	Washington Wizards	Piratas de Quebradillas (Puerto Rico)	
Jerel McNeal	September 21	Toronto Raptors	Sutor Basket Montegranaro (Italy)	
Chris Wright	September 21	Toronto Raptors	Golden State Warriors	
Adam Morrison	September 21	Portland Trail Blazers	Beşiktaş JK İstanbul (Turkey)	
Demonte Harper	September 21	Portland Trail Blazers	Cibona Zagreb (Croatia)	
Dallas Lauderdale	September 21	Portland Trail Blazers	Turów Zgorzelec (Poland)	
Louis Amundson	September 24	Minnesota Timberwolves	Indiana Pacers	
Marquis Daniels	September 25	Milwaukee Bucks	Boston Celtics	
D. J. Mbenga	September 25	Dallas Mavericks	New Orleans Hornets	
Josh Akognon	September 25	Dallas Mavericks	Canton Charge (D-League)	
Tu Holloway	September 25	Dallas Mavericks	Xavier (went undrafted in the 2012 draft)	
Jeff Adrien	September 25	Charlotte Bobcats	BC Khimki (Russia)	
Paris Horne	September 25	Charlotte Bobcats	BG Göttingen (Germany)	
Josh Owens	September 25	Charlotte Bobcats	Stanford (went undrafted in the 2012 draft)	
DaJuan Summers	September 25	Charlotte Bobcats	New Orleans Hornets	
Kyle Fogg	September 25	Houston Rockets	Arizona (went undrafted in the 2012 draft)	
Demetri McCamey	September 25	Houston Rockets	Hapoel Jerusalem (Israel)	
Cyril Awere	September 25	Sacramento Kings	Stade Nabeulien (Tunisia)	
Tony Mitchell	September 25	Sacramento Kings	Alabama (went undrafted in the 2012 draft)	
Hamady N'Diaye	September 25	Sacramento Kings	Maine Red Claws (D-League)	
Willie Reed	September 25	Sacramento Kings	Saint Louis (went undrafted in the 2010 draft)	
Carlon Brown	September 26	Golden State Warriors	Colorado (went undrafted in the 2012 draft)	
Lance Goulbourne	September 26	Golden State Warriors	Vanderbilt (went undrafted in the 2012 draft)	
Rick Jackson	September 26	Golden State Warriors	Chorale Roanne Basket (France)	
Tarence Kinsey	September 26	Golden State Warriors	Anadolu Efes (Turkey)	
Trey Gilder	September 26	Utah Jazz	Trotamundos de Carabobo (Venezuela)	
Darnell Jackson	September 26	Utah Jazz	Donetsk (Ukraine)	
Chris Quinn	September 26	Utah Jazz	BC Khimki (Russia)	
Brian Butch	September 26	Utah Jazz	Bakersfield Jam (D-League)	
Ronnie Aguilar	September 27	Los Angeles Lakers	Bakersfield Jam (D-League)	
Derrick Brown	September 27	San Antonio Spurs	Charlotte Bobcats	
Josh Powell	September 27	San Antonio Spurs	Brujos de Guayama (Puerto Rico)	
Tyler Wilkerson	September 27	San Antonio Spurs	Maccabi Haifa (Israel)	
Wesley Witherspoon	September 27	San Antonio Spurs	Memphis (went undrafted in the 2012 draft)	
Rodney Carney	September 27	Miami Heat	Liaoning Dinosaurs (China)	
Anthony Tolliver	September 27	Atlanta Hawks	Minnesota Timberwolves	
Keith Benson	September 27	Atlanta Hawks	Golden State Warriors	
Damion James	September 27	Atlanta Hawks	Brooklyn Nets	
James Anderson	September 27	Atlanta Hawks	San Antonio Spurs	
Carldell Johnson	September 27	Atlanta Hawks	Austin Toros (D-League)	
Dan Gadzuric	September 27	Philadelphia 76ers	Portland Trail Blazers (waived on July 19)	
Devin Searcy	September 27	Philadelphia 76ers	Toyama Grouses (Japan)	
Xavier Silas	September 27	Philadelphia 76ers		
Damien Wilkins	September 27	Philadelphia 76ers	Detroit Pistons	
Darko Miličić	September 28	Boston Celtics	Minnesota Timberwolves (waived on July 12)	
Micah Downs	September 28	Boston Celtics	Assignia Manresa (Spain)	
Rob Kurz	September 28	Boston Celtics	SLUC Nancy Basket (France)	
Will Conroy	September 28	Minnesota Timberwolves	Rio Grande Valley Vipers (D-League)	
Mike Harris	September 28	Minnesota Timberwolves	Atléticos de San Germán (Puerto Rico)	
Chris Johnson	September 28	Minnesota Timberwolves	New Orleans Hornets	
Phil Jones	September 28	Minnesota Timberwolves	Cluj-Napoca (Romania)	
Seth Tarver	September 28	Minnesota Timberwolves	Idaho Stampede (D-League)	
Jermaine Taylor	September 28	Minnesota Timberwolves	Rio Grande Valley Vipers (D-League)	
Kevin Jones	September 28	Cleveland Cavaliers	West Virginia (went undrafted in the 2012 draft)	
Kevin Anderson	September 28	Cleveland Cavaliers	Strasbourg IG (France)	
Jeremy Pargo	September 28	Cleveland Cavaliers	Memphis Grizzlies	
Michael Dunigan	September 29	Memphis Grizzlies	BC Dnipro-Azot (Ukraine)	
Ronald Dupree	September 29	Memphis Grizzlies	Aget Imola (Italy)	
Jarrid Famous	September 29	Memphis Grizzlies	Petron Blaze Boosters (Philippines)	
Jerome Jordan	September 29	Memphis Grizzlies	Houston Rockets (waived on July 18)	
D. J. Kennedy	September 29	Memphis Grizzlies (waived on September 18)		
Armon Johnson	September 29	Orlando Magic	Brooklyn Nets	
DeQuan Jones	September 29	Orlando Magic	Miami (went undrafted in the 2012 draft)	
Marqus Blakely	September 29	Los Angeles Clippers	San Mig Coffee Mixers (Philippines)	
Courtney Fortson	September 29	Los Angeles Clippers	Houston Rockets (waived on September 25)	
Trent Plaisted	September 29	Los Angeles Clippers	Aliağa Petkim (Turkey)	
Ike Diogu	October 1	Phoenix Suns	Capitanes de Arecibo (Puerto Rico)	
Othyus Jeffers	October 1	Phoenix Suns	Washington Wizards	
Luke Zeller	October 1	Phoenix Suns	Austin Toros (D-League)	
Diante Garrett	October 1	Phoenix Suns	JSF Nanterre (France)	
Solomon Jones	October 1	Phoenix Suns	New Orleans Hornets	
Terrence Williams	October 1	Detroit Pistons	Sacramento Kings	
Jonny Flynn	October 1	Detroit Pistons	Portland Trail Blazers	
Isma'il Muhammad	October 1	Atlanta Hawks	Auckland Pirates (New Zealand)	
Walker Russell, Jr.	October 1	Oklahoma City Thunder	Detroit Pistons	
Chris Douglas-Roberts	October 1	Los Angeles Lakers	Virtus Bologna (Italy)	
Alando Tucker	October 1	Milwaukee Bucks	Texas Legends (D-League)	
Eddie Gill	October 1	Milwaukee Bucks	Townsville Crocodiles (Australia)	
Orien Greene	October 1	Milwaukee Bucks	Los Angeles D-Fenders (D-League)	
Mustapha Farrakhan, Jr.	October 1	Milwaukee Bucks	Bakersfield Jam (D-League)	
Jannero Pargo	October 1	Washington Wizards	Atlanta Hawks	
Ryan Allen	October 1	Chicago Bulls	Wisconsin–Milwaukee (went undrafted in the 2012 draft)	
Vance Cooksey	October 1	Chicago Bulls	Rio Grande Valley Vipers (D-League)	
Andre Emmett	October 1	Chicago Bulls	Sporting Al Riyadi Beirut (Lebanon)	
Kyrylo Fesenko	October 1	Chicago Bulls	Indiana Pacers	
Marko Jarić	October 1	Chicago Bulls	Montepaschi Siena (Italy)	
Mikki Moore	October 1	Philadelphia 76ers	Golden State Warriors	
Kyle Weaver	October 1	Memphis Grizzlies	Alba Berlin (Germany)	
Ronald Murray	October 1	Memphis Grizzlies	Austin Toros (D-League)	
Anthony Carter	October 1	Denver Nuggets	Toronto Raptors	
Ben Uzoh	October 1	Denver Nuggets	Toronto Raptors	
Eddy Curry	October 1	San Antonio Spurs	Miami Heat	
Sherron Collins	October 1	San Antonio Spurs	Hacettepe Üniversitesi (Turkey)	
Solomon Alabi	October 1	New Orleans Hornets	Toronto Raptors	
Chris Wright	October 1	New Orleans Hornets	Olin Edirne Basket (Turkey)	
Dominique Morrison	October 1	New Orleans Hornets	Oral Roberts (went undrafted in the 2012 draft)	
Coby Karl	October 1	Portland Trail Blazers	Sutor Basket Montegranaro (Italy)	
Justin Holiday	October 1	Cleveland Cavaliers	Generali Okapi Aalstar (Belgium)	
Hank Thorns	October 1	Los Angeles Clippers	TCU (went undrafted in the 2012 draft)	
Chris Johnson	October 1	Los Angeles Clippers	Dayton (went undrafted in the 2012 draft)	
Stefhon Hannah	October 1	Golden State Warriors	Dakota Wizards (D-League)	
Rasheed Wallace	October 3	New York Knicks	Retired (rights last owned by Boston)	
Chris Johnson	October 9	Orlando Magic (claimed off waivers)	Los Angeles Clippers (waived on October 7)	
Justin Holiday	October 12	Portland Trail Blazers (claimed off waivers)	Cleveland Cavaliers (waived on October 10)	
Leandro Barbosa	October 18	Boston Celtics	Indiana Pacers	
JaMychal Green	October 22	San Antonio Spurs	Alabama (went undrafted in the 2012 draft)	
Eddy Curry	October 25	Dallas Mavericks (claimed off waivers)	San Antonio Spurs (waived on October 23)	
D'Aundray Brown	October 25	Cleveland Cavaliers	Cleveland State (went undrafted in the 2012 draft)	
Chris Douglas-Roberts	October 27	Dallas Mavericks (claimed off waivers)	Los Angeles Lakers (waived on October 22)	
Melvin Ely	October 27	Dallas Mavericks	Brujos de Guayama (Puerto Rico)	
Daniel Orton	October 31	Oklahoma City Thunder (waived on October 27)		
Troy Murphy	November 2	Dallas Mavericks	Los Angeles Lakers	
Shaun Livingston	November 15	Washington Wizards	Houston Rockets (waived on October 29)	
Josh Howard	November 15	Minnesota Timberwolves	Utah Jazz	
James Anderson	November 21	San Antonio Spurs	Rio Grande Valley Vipers (D-League)	
Derek Fisher	November 29	Dallas Mavericks	Oklahoma City Thunder	
Kevin Jones	November 29	Cleveland Cavaliers (waived on October 27)		
Mickaël Piétrus	November 30	Toronto Raptors	Boston Celtics	
Jeff Adrien	December 9	Charlotte Bobcats	Rio Grande Valley Vipers (D-League)	
Dominic McGuire	December 16	New Orleans Hornets	Toronto Raptors (waived on November 30)	
Chris Douglas-Roberts	December 23	Dallas Mavericks (waived on October 28)	Texas Legends (D-League)	
Jarvis Varnado	December 24	Boston Celtics	Sioux Falls Skyforce (D-League)	
Shelvin Mack	December 25	Washington Wizards	Maine Red Claws (D-League)	
Garrett Temple	December 25	Washington Wizards	Reno Bighorns (D-League)	
Shaun Livingston	December 25	Cleveland Cavaliers (claimed off waivers)	Washington Wizards (waived on December 23)	
Lazar Hayward	December 31	Minnesota Timberwolves	Houston Rockets (waived on October 29)	
James Anderson	January 2	Houston Rockets	Rio Grande Valley Vipers (D-League)	
Daequan Cook	January 6	Chicago Bulls	Houston Rockets (waived on January 2)	
Dominic McGuire	January 7	Indiana Pacers (10-day contract)	New Orleans Hornets (waived on January 4)	
Donald Sloan	January 7	New Orleans Hornets (10-day contract)	Sioux Falls Skyforce (D-League)	
Patrick Beverley	January 7	Houston Rockets	BC Spartak Saint Petersburg (Russia)	
Mike James	January 8	Dallas Mavericks (10-day contract)	Texas Legends (D-League)	
Lazar Hayward	January 8	Minnesota Timberwolves (10-day contract, previously waived on January 6)		
Maalik Wayns	January 8	Philadelphia 76ers (10-day contract, previously waived on January 6)		
Jarvis Varnado	January 9	Miami Heat (10-day contract)	Boston Celtics (waived on January 6)	
Josh Harrellson	January 10	Miami Heat (10-day contract, previously waived on January 7)		
Damion James	January 13	Brooklyn Nets (10-day contract)	Bakersfield Jam (D-League)	
Dominic McGuire	January 17	Indiana Pacers (second 10-day contract)		
Shelvin Mack	January 17	Philadelphia 76ers (10-day contract)	Maine Red Claws (D-League)	
Mike James	January 18	Dallas Mavericks (second 10-day contract)		
Chris Johnson	January 19	Minnesota Timberwolves (10-day contract)	Santa Cruz Warriors (D-League)	
Mickaël Gelabale	January 19	Minnesota Timberwolves (10-day contract)	Valencia BC (Spain)	
Chris Andersen	January 20	Miami Heat (10-day contract)	Denver Nuggets (waived on July 17)	
Jarvis Varnado	January 20	Miami Heat (second 10-day contract)		
Jannero Pargo	January 21	Atlanta Hawks (10-day contract)	Washington Wizards (waived on November 15)	
Aron Baynes	January 23	San Antonio Spurs	Union Olimpija (Slovenia)	
Chris Johnson	January 23	Memphis Grizzlies (10-day contract)	Rio Grande Valley Vipers (D-League)	
Mike James	January 28	Dallas Mavericks (signed for rest of season)		
Shelvin Mack	January 28	Philadelphia 76ers (second 10-day contract)		
Sam Young	January 28	Indiana Pacers (waived on January 6)		
Chris Johnson	January 29	Minnesota Timberwolves (second 10-day contract)		
Mickaël Gelabale	January 29	Minnesota Timberwolves (second 10-day contract)		
Chris Andersen	January 30	Miami Heat (second 10-day contract)		
Jarvis Varnado	January 30	Miami Heat (signed for rest of season)		
Jannero Pargo	February 2	Atlanta Hawks (second 10-day contract)		
Chris Johnson	February 3	Memphis Grizzlies (second 10-day contract)		
Jeremy Pargo	February 7	Philadelphia 76ers (10-day contract)	Cleveland Cavaliers (waived on January 22)	
Chris Andersen	February 8	Miami Heat (signed for rest of season)		
Chris Johnson	February 8	Minnesota Timberwolves (signed for rest of season)		
Mickaël Gelabale	February 8	Minnesota Timberwolves (signed for rest of season)		
Jeremy Pargo	February 18	Philadelphia 76ers (signed for rest of season)		
Terrence Williams	February 20	Boston Celtics (10-day contract)	Guangdong Southern Tigers (China)	
Kenyon Martin	February 23	New York Knicks (10-day contract)	Los Angeles Clippers	
Derek Fisher	February 25	Oklahoma City Thunder	Dallas Mavericks (waived on December 22)	
Tim Ohlbrecht	February 25	Houston Rockets	Rio Grande Valley Vipers (D-League)	
D. J. White	February 28	Boston Celtics (10-day contract)	Shanghai Sharks (China)	
Shavlik Randolph	March 1	Boston Celtics (10-day contract)	Foshan Dralions (China)	
Lou Amundson	March 2	Chicago Bulls (10-day contract)	Minnesota Timberwolves (waived on February 8)	
Juwan Howard	March 2	Miami Heat (10-day contract)		
Henry Sims	March 3	New Orleans Hornets (10-day contract)	Erie BayHawks (D-League)	
Terrence Williams	March 3	Boston Celtics (signed multi-year contract)		
Aaron Brooks	March 5	Houston Rockets	Sacramento Kings (waived on March 1)	
Kenyon Martin	March 5	New York Knicks (second 10-day contract)		
Shelvin Mack	March 6	Atlanta Hawks (10-day contract)	Maine Red Claws (D-League)	
Malcolm Thomas	March 8	Golden State Warriors (10-day contract)	Los Angeles D-Fenders (D-League)	
Terrel Harris	March 8	New Orleans Hornets (10-day contract)	Erie BayHawks (D-League)	
Maalik Wayns	March 9	Los Angeles Clippers (10-day contract)	Rio Grande Valley Vipers (D-League)	
D. J. White	March 10	Boston Celtics (second 10-day contract)		
Travis Leslie	March 10	Utah Jazz (10-day contract)	Santa Cruz Warriors (D-League)	
Shavlik Randolph	March 11	Boston Celtics (second 10-day contract)		
Lou Amundson	March 12	New Orleans Hornets (signed for rest of season)	Chicago Bulls (10-day contract expired)	
Juwan Howard	March 12	Miami Heat (second 10-day contract)		
Chris Wright	March 13	Dallas Mavericks (10-day contract)	Iowa Energy (D-League)	
Jannero Pargo	March 14	Charlotte Bobcats (10-day contract)	Atlanta Hawks (second 10-day contract expired February 12)	
DaJuan Summers	March 15	Los Angeles Clippers (10-day contract)	Maine Red Claws (D-League)	
Kenyon Martin	March 15	New York Knicks (signed for rest of season)		
Shelvin Mack	March 16	Atlanta Hawks (second 10-day contract)		
Terrel Harris	March 18	New Orleans Hornets (second 10-day contract)		
Malcolm Thomas	March 19	Chicago Bulls (10-day contract)	Golden State Warriors (10-day contract expired March 18)	
Maalik Wayns	March 19	Los Angeles Clippers (second 10-day contract)		
D. J. White	March 20	Boston Celtics (signed multi-year contract)		
Chris Quinn	March 20	Cleveland Cavaliers	Tulsa 66ers (D-League)	
Shavlik Randolph	March 21	Boston Celtics (signed multi-year contract)		
Juwan Howard	March 22	Miami Heat (signed for rest of season)		
Jannero Pargo	March 24	Charlotte Bobcats (second 10-day contract)		
DaJuan Summers	March 25	Los Angeles Clippers (second 10-day contract)		
Justin Dentmon	March 25	Dallas Mavericks (10-day contract)	Texas Legends (D-League)	
Shelvin Mack	March 26	Atlanta Hawks (signed for rest of season)		
Jerel McNeal	March 27	Utah Jazz (10-day contract)	Bakersfield Jam (D-League)	
Terrel Harris	March 28	New Orleans Hornets (signed for rest of season)		
Maalik Wayns	March 29	Los Angeles Clippers (signed for rest of season)		
Malcolm Thomas	March 29	Chicago Bulls (second 10-day contract)		
Justin Holiday	April 1	Philadelphia 76ers	Idaho Stampede (D-League)	
Kris Joseph	April 2	Brooklyn Nets (10-day contract)	Springfield Armor (D-League)	
Josh Akognon	April 3	Dallas Mavericks (10-day contract)	Liaoning Dinosaurs (China)	
Jannero Pargo	April 3	Charlotte Bobcats (signed for rest of season)		
Keyon Dooling	April 3	Memphis Grizzlies	Boston Celtics (waived on September 20)	
DaJuan Summers	April 4	Los Angeles Clippers (signed for rest of season)		
Jerel McNeal	April 6	Utah Jazz (signed for rest of season)		
Scott Machado	April 7	Golden State Warriors (10-day contract)	Santa Cruz Warriors (D-League)	
Malcolm Thomas	April 8	Chicago Bulls (signed for rest of season)		
Solomon Jones	April 12	New York Knicks	Liaoning Dinosaurs (China)	
Kris Joseph	April 12	Brooklyn Nets (signed for rest of season)		
Josh Akognon	April 13	Dallas Mavericks (signed for rest of season)		
Andrew Goudelock	April 14	Los Angeles Lakers	Rio Grande Valley Vipers (D-League)	
Quentin Richardson	April 16	New York Knicks	Orlando Magic (waived on October 27)	
Tracy McGrady	April 16	San Antonio Spurs	Qingdao DoubleStar (China)	
Earl Barron	April 17	New York Knicks	Washington Wizards (waived on December 13)	
Dwayne Jones	April 17	Golden State Warriors	Texas Legends (D-League)	
Donté Greene	April 17	Memphis Grizzlies	Atléticos de San Germán (Puerto Rico)	
Willie Reed	April 17	Memphis Grizzlies	Springfield Armor (D-League)	
Scott Machado	April 17	Golden State Warriors (signed for rest of season)		
Erick Dampier			Atlanta Hawks	
Brian Cardinal			Dallas Mavericks	
Earl Boykins			Houston Rockets	
Bobby Simmons			Los Angeles Clippers	
Mike Bibby			New York Knicks	
Baron Davis			New York Knicks	
Tony Battie			Philadelphia 76ers	
Michael Redd			Phoenix Suns	
Maurice Evans			Washington Wizards	

=== Released ===
==== Waived ====
Player	Date waived	Former team	Ref
Rashard Lewis	June 30	New Orleans Hornets	
Manny Harris	July 2	Cleveland Cavaliers	
Jamario Moon	July 2	Charlotte Bobcats	
Elton Brand*	July 11	Philadelphia 76ers	
Brendan Haywood*	July 12	Dallas Mavericks	
Darko Miličić*	July 12	Minnesota Timberwolves	
Luis Scola*	July 13	Houston Rockets	
Martell Webster	July 13	Minnesota Timberwolves	
Josh Childress*	July 15	Phoenix Suns	
Jordan Farmar	July 16	Atlanta Hawks	
Hassan Whiteside	July 16	Sacramento Kings	
Darryl Watkins	July 16	Philadelphia 76ers	
Chris Andersen*	July 17	Denver Nuggets	
Andray Blatche*	July 17	Washington Wizards	
Ryan Gomes*	July 18	Los Angeles Clippers	
Jon Leuer	July 18	Houston Rockets	
Jerome Jordan	July 18	Houston Rockets	
Dan Gadzuric	July 19	Portland Trail Blazers	
E'Twaun Moore	July 25	Houston Rockets	
Jerome Dyson	August 15	Phoenix Suns	
Brad Miller	August 15	Phoenix Suns	
Josh Harrellson	August 15	Houston Rockets	
Derrick Byars	August 21	San Antonio Spurs	
Sean Williams	August 29	Houston Rockets	
Diamon Simpson	September 7	Houston Rockets	
Jordan Williams	September 17	Atlanta Hawks	
D. J. Kennedy	September 18	Memphis Grizzlies	
Keyon Dooling	September 20	Boston Celtics	
Courtney Fortson	September 25	Houston Rockets	
Travis Leslie	October 30	Los Angeles Clippers	
Eddy Curry	November 2	Dallas Mavericks	
Jannero Pargo	November 15	Washington Wizards	
Will Conroy	November 15	Minnesota Timberwolves	
Matt Carroll	November 20	New Orleans Hornets	
Darko Miličić	November 21	Boston Celtics	
Troy Murphy	November 29	Dallas Mavericks	
Luke Harangody	November 29	Cleveland Cavaliers	
Dominic McGuire	November 30	Toronto Raptors	
Cory Higgins	December 9	Charlotte Bobcats	
James Anderson	December 20	San Antonio Spurs	
Derek Fisher	December 22	Dallas Mavericks	
Earl Barron	December 23	Washington Wizards	
Shaun Livingston	December 23	Washington Wizards	
Donald Sloan	December 25	Cleveland Cavaliers	
Josh Childress	December 29	Brooklyn Nets	
Daequan Cook	January 2	Houston Rockets	
Dominic McGuire	January 4	New Orleans Hornets	
Terrel Harris	January 5	Miami Heat	
Kris Joseph	January 6	Boston Celtics	
Jarvis Varnado	January 6	Boston Celtics	
Samardo Samuels	January 6	Cleveland Cavaliers	
Chris Douglas-Roberts	January 6	Dallas Mavericks	
Sam Young	January 6	Indiana Pacers	
Lazar Hayward	January 6	Minnesota Timberwolves	
Maalik Wayns	January 6	Philadelphia 76ers	
Shelvin Mack	January 7	Washington Wizards	
Scott Machado	January 7	Houston Rockets	
Josh Harrellson	January 7	Miami Heat	
Darius Johnson-Odom	January 7	Los Angeles Lakers	
Jeremy Pargo	January 22	Cleveland Cavaliers	
Lou Amundson	February 8	Minnesota Timberwolves	
Ronnie Price	February 21	Portland Trail Blazers	
Luke Zeller	February 21	Phoenix Suns	
Hakim Warrick	February 23	Orlando Magic	
Aaron Brooks	March 1	Sacramento Kings	
Josh Selby	March 3	Cleveland Cavaliers	
Tyler Honeycutt	March 5	Houston Rockets	
Jeremy Tyler	March 6	Atlanta Hawks	
Dominique Jones	March 9	Dallas Mavericks	
Raja Bell	March 10	Utah Jazz	
Henry Sims	March 12	New Orleans Hornets	
Trey Thompkins	March 14	Los Angeles Clippers	
Jeremy Pargo	April 1	Philadelphia 76ers	
Justin Dentmon	April 3	Dallas Mavericks	
Stephen Jackson	April 12	San Antonio Spurs	
Kurt Thomas	April 12	New York Knicks	
Dexter Pittman	April 14	Memphis Grizzlies	
Solomon Jones	April 15	New York Knicks	
Jared Jeffries	April 18	Portland Trail Blazers	
Brandon Roy	May 10	Minnesota Timberwolves	

Note

- * Released under the amnesty clause in the CBA, which gives teams a one-time option to waive a player's remaining contract from the salary cap.

==== Training camp cuts ====
All players listed did not make the final roster.

Atlanta Hawks	Boston Celtics	Brooklyn Nets	Charlotte Bobcats	Chicago Bulls
James Anderson; Keith Benson; Damion James; Carldell Johnson; Isma’il Muhammad	Dionte Christmas; Micah Downs; Rob Kurz; Jamar Smith	Stephen Dennis; James Mays; Carleton Scott	Jeff Adrien; Paris Horne; Josh Owens; DaJuan Summers	Ryan Allen; Vance Cooksey; Andre Emmett; Kyrylo Fesenko; Marko Jarić
Cleveland Cavaliers	Dallas Mavericks	Denver Nuggets	Detroit Pistons	Golden State Warriors
Kevin Anderson; D'Aundray Brown; Kelenna Azubuike; Micheal Eric; Justin Holiday; Kevin Jones	Josh Akognon; Chris Douglas-Roberts; Melvin Ely; Tu Holloway; D. J. Mbenga; Delonte West	Anthony Carter; Ben Uzoh	Jonny Flynn; Terrence Williams	Carlon Brown; Lance Goulbourne; Stefhon Hannah; Rick Jackson; Tarence Kinsey
Houston Rockets	Indiana Pacers	Los Angeles Clippers	Los Angeles Lakers	Memphis Grizzlies
Jon Brockman; Kyle Fogg; Gary Forbes; Lazar Hayward; JaJuan Johnson; Shaun Livingston; Demetri McCamey	Blake Ahearn; Sundiata Gaines; Luke Nevill	Marqus Blakely; Courtney Fortson; Chris Johnson; Trent Plaisted; Hank Thorns	Ronnie Aguilar; Chris Douglas-Roberts; Andrew Goudelock; Reeves Nelson; Greg Somogyi	Michael Dunigan; Ronald Dupree; Jarrid Famous; Jerome Jordan; D. J. Kennedy; Ronald Murray; Kyle Weaver
Miami Heat	Milwaukee Bucks	Minnesota Timberwolves	New Orleans Hornets	New York Knicks
Rodney Carney; Robert Dozier; Mickell Gladness; Garrett Temple; Jarvis Varnado	Mustapha Farrakhan, Jr.; Eddie Gill; Orien Greene; Alando Tucker	Chris Johnson; Mike Harris; Phil Jones; Seth Tarver; Jermaine Taylor	Solomon Alabi; Dominique Morrison; Chris Wright	Oscar Bellfield; John Shurna; Henry Sims; Chris Smith; Mychel Thompson
Oklahoma City Thunder	Orlando Magic	Philadelphia 76ers	Phoenix Suns	Portland Trail Blazers
Daniel Orton; Andy Rautins; Walker Russell, Jr.; Hollis Thompson	Christian Eyenga; Justin Harper; Armon Johnson; Chris Johnson; Quentin Richardson	Dan Gadzuric; Mikki Moore; Devin Searcy; Xavier Silas	Ike Diogu; Othyus Jeffers; Solomon Jones	Demonte Harper; Justin Holiday; Coby Karl; Dallas Lauderdale; Adam Morrison
Sacramento Kings	San Antonio Spurs	Toronto Raptors	Utah Jazz	Washington Wizards
Cyril Awere; Tony Mitchell; Hamady N'Diaye; Willie Reed	Derrick Brown; Sherron Collins; Eddy Curry; JaMychal Green; Josh Powell; Tyler Wilkerson; Wesley Witherspoon	Jamaal Magloire; Jerel McNeal; Chris Wright	Brian Butch; Trey Gilder; Darnell Jackson; Chris Quinn	Brian Cook; Steven Gray; Shelvin Mack; Shavlik Randolph

=== D-League assignments ===
Each NBA team can assign players with two years or less of experience to its affiliated NBA Development League team. Players with more than two years of experience may be assigned to the D-League with the players' consent.

Player	Date assigned	Date recalled	NBA team	D-League team
Tyler Honeycutt	November 7		Sacramento Kings	Reno Bighorns
Darius Johnson-Odom	November 10	November 13	Los Angeles Lakers	Los Angeles D-Fenders
Quincy Miller	November 13	December 2	Denver Nuggets	Iowa Energy
Scott Machado	November 14	November 26	Houston Rockets	Rio Grande Valley Vipers
Donatas Motiejūnas	November 14	November 25	Houston Rockets	Rio Grande Valley Vipers
Kris Joseph	November 14	November 27	Boston Celtics	Maine Red Claws
Fab Melo	November 14	November 28	Boston Celtics	Maine Red Claws
Cory Joseph	November 15	November 15	San Antonio Spurs	Austin Toros
Darius Johnson-Odom (2)	November 17	November 18	Los Angeles Lakers	Los Angeles D-Fenders
Orlando Johnson	November 22	November 26	Indiana Pacers	Fort Wayne Mad Ants
Miles Plumlee	November 22	November 26	Indiana Pacers	Fort Wayne Mad Ants
DeAndre Liggins	November 22	December 1	Oklahoma City Thunder	Tulsa 66ers
Daniel Orton	November 22	December 7	Oklahoma City Thunder	Tulsa 66ers
Darius Johnson-Odom (3)	November 25		Los Angeles Lakers	Los Angeles D-Fenders
Kevin Murphy	November 26		Utah Jazz	Reno Bighorns
Tony Wroten	November 27	December 17	Memphis Grizzlies	Reno Bighorns
Robert Sacre	November 28	December 3	Los Angeles Lakers	Los Angeles D-Fenders
Jeremy Lamb	November 29	December 7	Oklahoma City Thunder	Tulsa 66ers
Kendall Marshall	November 29	December 21	Phoenix Suns	Bakersfield Jam
Kris Joseph (2)	November 29	November 30	Boston Celtics	Maine Red Claws
Fab Melo (2)	November 29	December 10	Boston Celtics	Maine Red Claws
Kevin Jones	November 29	December 3	Cleveland Cavaliers	Canton Charge
Scott Machado (2)	November 30	December 21	Houston Rockets	Rio Grande Valley Vipers
Terrence Jones	November 30	December 3	Houston Rockets	Rio Grande Valley Vipers
Kent Bazemore	November 30	December 1	Golden State Warriors	Santa Cruz Warriors
Cory Joseph (2)	December 1	December 5	San Antonio Spurs	Austin Toros
Mike Scott	December 1	December 11	Atlanta Hawks	Bakersfield Jam
John Jenkins	December 1	December 5	Atlanta Hawks	Bakersfield Jam
Jeremy Tyler	December 2	December 3	Golden State Warriors	Santa Cruz Warriors
Kris Joseph (3)	December 2	December 5	Boston Celtics	Maine Red Claws
Nando de Colo	December 2	December 3	San Antonio Spurs	Austin Toros
Perry Jones III	December 3	December 7	Oklahoma City Thunder	Tulsa 66ers
Quincy Acy	December 6	December 12	Toronto Raptors	Bakersfield Jam
Jon Leuer	December 7	December 20	Cleveland Cavaliers	Canton Charge
Will Barton	December 7	December 9	Portland Trail Blazers	Idaho Stampede
Victor Claver	December 7	December 9	Portland Trail Blazers	Idaho Stampede
Jeremy Lamb (2)	December 8	December 10	Oklahoma City Thunder	Tulsa 66ers
Daniel Orton (2)	December 8	December 10	Oklahoma City Thunder	Tulsa 66ers
Reggie Jackson	December 8	December 9	Oklahoma City Thunder	Tulsa 66ers
Kris Joseph (4)	December 8	December 9	Boston Celtics	Maine Red Claws
Jared Cunningham	December 11	December 31	Dallas Mavericks	Texas Legends
Kim English	December 12	December 19	Detroit Pistons	Fort Wayne Mad Ants
Khris Middleton	December 12	December 19	Detroit Pistons	Fort Wayne Mad Ants
Fab Melo (3)	December 12	December 24	Boston Celtics	Maine Red Claws
Miles Plumlee (2)	December 13	December 19	Indiana Pacers	Fort Wayne Mad Ants
Jeremy Lamb (3)	December 14	December 17	Oklahoma City Thunder	Tulsa 66ers
Daniel Orton (3)	December 14	December 17	Oklahoma City Thunder	Tulsa 66ers
Joel Freeland	December 14	December 16	Portland Trail Blazers	Idaho Stampede
Victor Claver (2)	December 14	December 16	Portland Trail Blazers	Idaho Stampede
Terrence Jones (2)	December 14	December 16	Houston Rockets	Rio Grande Valley Vipers
Donatas Motiejūnas (2)	December 14	December 18	Houston Rockets	Rio Grande Valley Vipers
Cory Joseph (3)	December 17		San Antonio Spurs	Austin Toros
Josh Selby	December 17	December 22	Memphis Grizzlies	Reno Bighorns
James White	December 18	December 19	New York Knicks	Erie BayHawks
Chris Copeland	December 18	December 19	New York Knicks	Erie BayHawks
Amar'e Stoudemire	December 18	December 21	New York Knicks	Erie BayHawks
Perry Jones III (2)	December 19	December 23	Oklahoma City Thunder	Tulsa 66ers
DeAndre Liggins (2)	December 19	December 23	Oklahoma City Thunder	Tulsa 66ers
Kawhi Leonard	December 19	December 20	San Antonio Spurs	Austin Toros
James White (2)	December 20	December 21	New York Knicks	Erie BayHawks
Chris Copeland (2)	December 20	December 21	New York Knicks	Erie BayHawks
Tornike Shengelia	December 21	December 22	Brooklyn Nets	Springfield Armor
Tyshawn Taylor	December 21	December 22	Brooklyn Nets	Springfield Armor
Arnett Moultrie	December 21		Philadelphia 76ers	Sioux Falls Skyforce
Reggie Jackson (2)	December 21	December 23	Oklahoma City Thunder	Tulsa 66ers
Kris Joseph (5)	December 22	December 23	Boston Celtics	Maine Red Claws
Kent Bazemore (2)	December 23	December 24	Golden State Warriors	Santa Cruz Warriors
Jeremy Tyler (2)	December 23	December 24	Golden State Warriors	Santa Cruz Warriors
Fab Melo (4)	December 24		Boston Celtics	Maine Red Claws
Dexter Pittman	December 24		Miami Heat	Sioux Falls Skyforce
Tony Wroten (2)	December 26	December 31	Memphis Grizzlies	Reno Bighorns
Terrence Jones (3)	December 26		Houston Rockets	Rio Grande Valley Vipers
Perry Jones III (3)	December 27	December 31	Oklahoma City Thunder	Tulsa 66ers
DeAndre Liggins (3)	December 27	December 31	Oklahoma City Thunder	Tulsa 66ers
Daniel Orton (4)	December 27	December 31	Oklahoma City Thunder	Tulsa 66ers
Quincy Miller (2)	December 27		Denver Nuggets	Iowa Energy
Kent Bazemore (3)	December 27	December 28	Golden State Warriors	Santa Cruz Warriors
Jeremy Tyler (3)	December 27	December 28	Golden State Warriors	Santa Cruz Warriors
Samardo Samuels	December 28	December 31	Cleveland Cavaliers	Canton Charge
Miles Plumlee (3)	December 28	December 29	Indiana Pacers	Fort Wayne Mad Ants
Darius Miller	December 31		New Orleans Hornets	Iowa Energy
Kent Bazemore (4)	December 31	January 2	Golden State Warriors	Santa Cruz Warriors
Jeremy Tyler (4)	December 31	January 2	Golden State Warriors	Santa Cruz Warriors
Jon Leuer (2)	January 3		Cleveland Cavaliers	Canton Charge
Orlando Johnson (2)	January 3		Indiana Pacers	Fort Wayne Mad Ants
Miles Plumlee (4)	January 3		Indiana Pacers	Fort Wayne Mad Ants
Robert Sacre (2)	January 5	January 7	Los Angeles Lakers	Los Angeles D-Fenders
Diante Garrett	January 10	January 28	Phoenix Suns	Bakersfield Jam
Royce White	February 11		Houston Rockets	Rio Grande Valley Vipers

Note

- Numbers in parentheses indicates the number of assignments a player has received during the season.

=== Going overseas ===
*	Denotes international players who returned to their home country

Player	Date signed	New team	New country	NBA team	NBA contract status	Ref
Semih Erden*	July 3	Anadolu Efes	Turkey	Cleveland Cavaliers	Restricted free agent	
Rudy Fernández*	July 4	Real Madrid	Spain	Denver Nuggets	Restricted free agent	
Jordan Farmar	July 12	Anadolu Efes	Turkey	Atlanta Hawks	Bought out of contract/waived	
Marcus Denmon	July 25	Élan Chalon	France	San Antonio Spurs	Unsigned draft pick	
Craig Brackins	August 1	Angelico Biella	Italy	Philadelphia 76ers	Unrestricted free agent	
Robbie Hummel	August 8	Blu:sens Monbús	Spain	Minnesota Timberwolves	Unsigned draft pick	
Craig Smith	August 11	Hapoel Jerusalem	Israel	Portland Trail Blazers	Unrestricted free agent	
Justin Hamilton	August 15	Cibona Zagreb	Croatia	Miami Heat	Unsigned draft pick	
Vernon Macklin	August 19	Royal Halı Gaziantep	Turkey	Detroit Pistons	Unrestricted free agent	
Morris Almond	August 19	Red Star Belgrade	Serbia	Washington Wizards	Unrestricted free agent	
Darryl Watkins	August 20	Lukoil Academic	Bulgaria	Philadelphia 76ers	Bought out of contract/waived	
Von Wafer	August 21	Xinjiang Flying Tigers	China	Orlando Magic	Unrestricted free agent	
Shelden Williams	August 28	Élan Chalon	France	Brooklyn Nets	Unrestricted free agent	
Diamon Simpson	September 4	Maccabi Ashdod	Israel	Houston Rockets	Bought out of contract/waived	
Manny Harris	September 13	BC Azovmash	Ukraine	Cleveland Cavaliers	Bought out of contract/waived	
James Singleton	September 18	Xinjiang Flying Tigers	China	Washington Wizards	Unrestricted free agent	
Yi Jianlian*	September 23	Guangdong Southern Tigers	China	Dallas Mavericks	Unrestricted free agent	
D. J. White	September 25	Shanghai Sharks	China	Charlotte Bobcats	Unrestricted free agent	
Jerome Dyson	October 3	Hapoel Holon	Israel	Phoenix Suns	Bought out of contract/waived	
Tracy McGrady	October 9	Qingdao DoubleStar Eagles	China	Atlanta Hawks	Unrestricted free agent	
Lester Hudson	October 12	Dongguan Leopards	China	Memphis Grizzlies	Unrestricted free agent	
Gilbert Arenas	November 19	Shanghai Sharks	China	Memphis Grizzlies	Unrestricted free agent	
Ryan Gomes	November 22	Artland Dragons	Germany	Los Angeles Clippers	Amnestied	
Gary Forbes	November 25	Zhejiang Guangsha Lions	China	Houston Rockets	Bought out of contract/waived	

== Draft ==
=== 2012 NBA draft ===
The 2012 NBA draft was held on June 28, 2012, at Prudential Center in Newark, New Jersey.

==== First round ====
Pick	Player	Date signed	Team	School/club team	Ref
1	Anthony Davis	July 24	New Orleans Hornets	Kentucky (Fr.)	
2	Michael Kidd-Gilchrist	July 7	Charlotte Bobcats	Kentucky (Fr.)	
3	Bradley Beal	July 6	Washington Wizards	Florida (Fr.)	
4	Dion Waiters	July 5	Cleveland Cavaliers	Syracuse (So.)	
5	Thomas Robinson	July 13	Sacramento Kings	Kansas (Jr.)	
6	Damian Lillard	July 13	Portland Trail Blazers (acquired from Brooklyn)	Weber St. (Jr.)	
7	Harrison Barnes	July 3	Golden State Warriors	North Carolina (So.)	
8	Terrence Ross	July 10	Toronto Raptors	Washington (So.)	
9	Andre Drummond	July 9	Detroit Pistons	Connecticut (Fr.)	
10	Austin Rivers	July 24	New Orleans Hornets (acquired from Minnesota via L.A. Clippers)	Duke (Fr.)	
11	Meyers Leonard	July 14	Portland Trail Blazers	Illinois (So.)	
12	Jeremy Lamb	July 26	Houston Rockets (acquired from Milwaukee)	Connecticut (So.)	
13	Kendall Marshall	July 16	Phoenix Suns	North Carolina (So.)	
14	John Henson	July 9	Milwaukee Bucks (acquired from Houston)	North Carolina (Jr.)	
15	Maurice Harkless	July 24	Philadelphia 76ers (later traded to Orlando)	St. John's (Fr.)	
16	Royce White	July 26	Houston Rockets (acquired from New York)	Iowa St. (So.)	
17	Tyler Zeller	July 5	Cleveland Cavaliers (acquired from Dallas)	North Carolina (Sr.)	
18	Terrence Jones	July 26	Houston Rockets (acquired from Utah via Minnesota)	Kentucky (So.)	
19	Andrew Nicholson	July 3	Orlando Magic	St. Bonaventure (Sr.)	
20	Evan Fournier	July 11	Denver Nuggets	Union Poitiers (France)	
21	Jared Sullinger	July 3	Boston Celtics	Ohio St. (So.)	
22	Fab Melo	July 3	Boston Celtics (acquired from L.A. Clippers via Oklahoma City)	Syracuse (So.)	
23	John Jenkins	July 9	Atlanta Hawks	Vanderbilt (Jr.)	
24	Jared Cunningham	July 21	Dallas Mavericks (acquired from Cleveland via L.A. Lakers)	Oregon St. (Jr.)	
25	Tony Wroten	July 13	Memphis Grizzlies	Washington (Fr.)	
26	Miles Plumlee	July 5	Indiana Pacers	Duke (Sr.)	
27	Arnett Moultrie	July 24	Philadelphia 76ers (acquired from Miami)	Mississippi St. (Jr.)	
28	Perry Jones III	July 6	Oklahoma City Thunder	Baylor (So.)	
29	Marquis Teague	August 8	Chicago Bulls	Kentucky (Fr.)	
30	Festus Ezeli	July 6	Golden State Warriors (acquired from San Antonio)	Vanderbilt (Sr.)	

==== Second round ====
Pick	Player	Date signed	Team	School/club team	Ref
31	Jeffery Taylor	July 13	Charlotte Bobcats	Vanderbilt (Sr.)	
32	Tomáš Satoranský		Washington Wizards	Banca Cívica (Spain)	
33	Bernard James	July 25	Dallas Mavericks (acquired from Cleveland)	Florida St. (Sr.)	
34	Jae Crowder	July 20	Dallas Mavericks (acquired from Cleveland via New Orleans)	Marquette (Sr.)	
35	Draymond Green	July 30	Golden State Warriors (acquired from Brooklyn)	Michigan St. (Sr.)	
36	Orlando Johnson	July 13	Indiana Pacers (acquired from Sacramento)	UC Santa Barbara (Sr.)	
37	Quincy Acy	July 16	Toronto Raptors	Baylor (Sr.)	
38	Quincy Miller	September 7	Denver Nuggets (acquired from Golden State via New York)	Baylor (Fr.)	
39	Khris Middleton	August 15	Detroit Pistons	Texas A&M (Jr.)	
40	Will Barton	July 14	Portland Trail Blazers (acquired from Minnesota via Houston)	Memphis (So.)	
41	Tyshawn Taylor	July 6	Brooklyn Nets (acquired from Portland)	Kansas (Sr.)	
42	Doron Lamb	July 9	Milwaukee Bucks	Kentucky (So.)	
43	Mike Scott	September 6	Atlanta Hawks (acquired from Phoenix)	Virginia (Sr.)	
44	Kim English	July 12	Detroit Pistons (acquired from Houston)	Missouri (Sr.)	
45	Justin Hamilton		Miami Heat (acquired from Philadelphia)	LSU (Jr.)	
46	Darius Miller	September 6	New Orleans Hornets (acquired from Dallas via Washington)	Kentucky (Sr.)	
47	Kevin Murphy	September 14	Utah Jazz	Tennessee Tech (Sr.)	
48	Kostas Papanikolaou		New York Knicks (later traded to Portland)	Olympiacos (Greece)	
49	Kyle O'Quinn	August 9	Orlando Magic	Norfolk St. (Sr.)	
50	İzzet Türkyılmaz		Denver Nuggets	Banvit (Turkey)	
51	Kris Joseph	July 3	Boston Celtics	Syracuse (Sr.)	
52	Ognjen Kuzmić		Golden State Warriors (acquired from Atlanta)	Clinicas Rincón (Spain)	
53	Furkan Aldemir		Los Angeles Clippers (later traded to Houston)	Galatasaray (Turkey)	
54	Tornike Shengelia	July 24	Brooklyn Nets (acquired from Philadelphia via Memphis)	Spirou Charleroi (Belgium)	
55	Darius Johnson-Odom	September 15	Los Angeles Lakers (acquired from Dallas via L.A. Lakers)	Marquette (Sr.)	
56	Tomislav Zubčić		Toronto Raptors (acquired from Indiana)	Cibona Zagreb (Croatia)	
57	İlkan Karaman		Brooklyn Nets (acquired from Miami)	Pınar Karşıyaka (Turkey)	
58	Robbie Hummel		Minnesota Timberwolves (acquired from Oklahoma City)	Purdue (Sr.)	
59	Marcus Denmon		San Antonio Spurs	Missouri (Sr.)	
60	Robert Sacre	September 7	Los Angeles Lakers (acquired from Chicago via Milwaukee and Brooklyn)	Gonzaga (Sr.)	

=== Previous years' draftees ===
Draft	Pick	Player	Date signed	Team	Previous team	Ref
2006	30	Joel Freeland	July 13	Portland Trail Blazers (from Detroit via Utah)	Unicaja Málaga (Spain)	
2009	22	Víctor Claver	July 11	Portland Trail Blazers (from Dallas)	Valencia BC (Spain)	
2009	53	Nando de Colo	July 13	San Antonio Spurs (from Houston)	Valencia BC (Spain)	
2009	60	Robert Dozier	September 27	Miami Heat	Cholet Basket (France)	
2010	41	Jarvis Varnado	September 7	Miami Heat (from New Orleans)	Pallacanestro Virtus Roma (Italy)	
2011	5	Jonas Valančiūnas	July 18	Toronto Raptors	BC Lietuvos rytas (Lithuania)	
2011	20	Donatas Motiejūnas	July 6	Houston Rockets (from Minnesota)	Prokom Gdynia (Poland)	
2011	33	Kyle Singler	July 11	Detroit Pistons	Real Madrid (Spain)	
