= 2011–12 Orlando Magic season =

NBA professional basketball team season

- Head coach: Stan Van Gundy
- General manager: Otis Smith
- Owners: RDV Sports, Inc.
- Arena: Amway Center

Results
- Record: 37–29 (.561)
- Place: Division: 3rd (Southeast); Conference: 6th (Eastern)
- Playoff finish: First round (lost to Pacers 1–4)
- Stats at Basketball Reference

Local media
- Television: Fox Sports Florida; Sun Sports
- Radio: WDBO

The 2011–12 Orlando Magic season was the 23rd season of the franchise in the National Basketball Association (NBA). The team finished in 6th place in the Eastern Conference with a 37–29 record in a regular season shortened by the lockout and an offseason where trade rumours that included starting center Dwight Howard abounded. After the Magic's playoff loss against the Indiana Pacers in the first round of the playoffs in five games, the Orlando franchise parted ways with head coach Stan Van Gundy and general manager Otis Smith. The Amway Center, the Magic's home court, was the venue of the 2012 NBA All-Star Game.

This season also marked the end of an era as Dwight Howard, along with Steve Nash from the Phoenix Suns, was traded to the Los Angeles Lakers in the 2012 off-season. The Magic did not earn a playoff berth again until the 2018–19 season when Dwight was with the Washington Wizards.

== Key dates ==
- June 23: The 2011 NBA draft took place at Prudential Center in Newark, New Jersey.
- December 18: The Magic had the first of their two-game preseason against Miami at American Airlines Arena.
- December 25: The regular season begins and the Magic have an away game at Oklahoma City. This is the Magic's first regular season game. They lost the season opener 89–97.
- December 26: The Magic had their first home game of the regular season at the Amway Center. They played the Houston Rockets. The Magic also achieved their first win of the season, with a score of 104–95.
- April 15: Orlando secures a playoff spot with a 100–84 win against the Cleveland Cavaliers.

== Draft picks ==
Round	Pick	Player	Position	Nationality	College
2	53	DeAndre Liggins	SG / SF	United States	Kentucky

== Roster ==
2011–12 Orlando Magic roster
Players

Pos.	No.	Player	Height	Weight	DOB	From
F/C	33	Ryan Anderson	6 ft 10 in (2.08 m)	240 lb (109 kg)	1988-05-06	California
F	3	Earl Clark	6 ft 10 in (2.08 m)	225 lb (102 kg)	1988-01-17	Louisville
F/C	11	Glen Davis	6 ft 9 in (2.06 m)	289 lb (131 kg)	1986-01-01	LSU
G	25	Chris Duhon	6 ft 1 in (1.85 m)	190 lb (86 kg)	1982-08-31	Duke
F	32	Justin Harper	6 ft 10 in (2.08 m)	225 lb (102 kg)	1989-08-30	Richmond
C	12	Dwight Howard	6 ft 11 in (2.11 m)	265 lb (120 kg)	1985-12-08	SW Atlanta Academy (GA)
F	34	DeAndre Liggins	6 ft 6 in (1.98 m)	209 lb (95 kg)	1988-03-31	Kentucky
G	14	Jameer Nelson	6 ft 0 in (1.83 m)	190 lb (86 kg)	1982-02-09	Saint Joseph's
F/C	21	Daniel Orton	6 ft 10 in (2.08 m)	255 lb (116 kg)	1990-08-06	Kentucky
G	7	JJ Redick	6 ft 4 in (1.93 m)	190 lb (86 kg)	1984-06-24	Duke
G	23	Jason Richardson	6 ft 6 in (1.98 m)	225 lb (102 kg)	1981-01-20	Michigan State
F	5	Quentin Richardson	6 ft 6 in (1.98 m)	228 lb (103 kg)	1980-04-13	DePaul
G	10	Ish Smith	6 ft 0 in (1.83 m)	175 lb (79 kg)	1988-07-05	Wake Forest
F	15	Hedo Türkoğlu	6 ft 10 in (2.08 m)	220 lb (100 kg)	1979-03-19	Turkey
G	1	Von Wafer	6 ft 5 in (1.96 m)	209 lb (95 kg)	1985-07-21	Florida State

Coaches
Head coach
- Stan Van Gundy
Assistant(s)
- Ahmad Ajami
- Bob Beyer
- Steve Clifford
- Patrick Ewing
- Brendan Malone

Legend
- (DP) Unsigned draft pick
- (FA) Free agent
- (S) Suspended
- Injured

Roster
Updated: February 2, 2012

=== Roster notes ===
- Center Dwight Howard played 54 games (his last game being on April 7, 2012) but missed the remainder of the season and the playoffs after undergoing back surgery to repair a herniated disk which also led to him missing the 2012 Summer Olympics in London.

== Pre-season ==
Due to the 2011 NBA lockout negotiations, the programmed pre-season schedule, along with the first two weeks of the regular season were scrapped, and a two-game pre-season was set for each team once the lockout concluded.

2011 pre-season game log
Pre-season: 1–1 (home: 1–0; road: 0–1)

Game	Date	Team	Score	High points	High rebounds	High assists	Location Attendance	Record
1	December 18	@ Miami	L 85–118	Ryan Anderson, JJ Redick (22)	Ryan Anderson (8)	Jameer Nelson (7)	American Airlines Arena; 20,100	0–1
2	December 21	Miami	W 104–100	Glen Davis (18)	Dwight Howard (9)	Jameer Nelson (10)	Amway Center; 19,045	1–1

2011–12 season schedule

== Regular season ==
=== Standings ===
Southeast Division	W	L	PCT	GB	Home	Road	Div	GP
y-Miami Heat	46	20	.697	–	28–5	18–15	9–5	66
x-Atlanta Hawks	40	26	.606	6	23–10	17–16	11–3	66
x-Orlando Magic	37	29	.561	9	21–12	16–17	8–7	66
Washington Wizards	20	46	.303	26	11–22	9–24	7–7	66
Charlotte Bobcats	7	59	.106	39	4–29	3–30	1–14	66

Eastern Conference
#	Team	W	L	PCT	GB	GP
1	z-Chicago Bulls	50	16	.758	–	66
2	y-Miami Heat *	46	20	.697	4.0	66
3	x-Indiana Pacers *	42	24	.636	8.0	66
4	y-Boston Celtics	39	27	.591	11.0	66
5	x-Atlanta Hawks	40	26	.606	10.0	66
6	x-Orlando Magic	37	29	.561	13.0	66
7	x-New York Knicks	36	30	.545	14.0	66
8	x-Philadelphia 76ers	35	31	.530	15.0	66
9	Milwaukee Bucks	31	35	.470	19.0	66
10	Detroit Pistons	25	41	.379	25.0	66
11	Toronto Raptors	23	43	.348	27.0	66
12	New Jersey Nets	22	44	.333	28.0	66
13	Cleveland Cavaliers	21	45	.318	29.0	66
14	Washington Wizards	20	46	.303	30.0	66
15	Charlotte Bobcats	7	59	.106	43.0	66

=== Game log ===
2011–12 game log
Total: 37–29 (home: 21–12; road: 16–17)
December: 3–1 (home: 2–0; road: 1–1)

Game	Date	Team	Score	High points	High rebounds	High assists	Location Attendance	Record
1	December 25	@ Oklahoma City	L 89–97	Ryan Anderson (25)	Dwight Howard (15)	Jameer Nelson (6)	Chesapeake Energy Arena; 18,203	0–1
2	December 26	Houston	W 104–95	Hedo Türkoğlu (23)	Dwight Howard (7)	Jameer Nelson (6)	Amway Center; 18,846	1–1
3	December 29	New Jersey	W 94–78	Ryan Anderson (22)	Dwight Howard (24)	Hedo Türkoğlu (7)	Amway Center; 18,954	2–1
4	December 30	@ Charlotte	W 100–79	Ryan Anderson (23)	Dwight Howard (24)	Chris Duhon (6)	Time Warner Cable Arena; 18,064	3–1

January: 9–8 (home: 4–4; road: 5–4)

Game	Date	Team	Score	High points	High rebounds	High assists	Location Attendance	Record
5	January 1	Toronto	W 102–96	Ryan Anderson (24)	Dwight Howard (15)	Hedo Türkoğlu (7)	Amway Center; 18,846	4–1
6	January 2	@ Detroit	L 78–89	Dwight Howard (19)	Dwight Howard (7)	Jameer Nelson (5)	The Palace of Auburn Hills; 8,120	4–2
7	January 4	Washington	W 103–85	Dwight Howard (28)	Dwight Howard (20)	Jameer Nelson (9)	Amway Center; 18,846	5–2
8	January 6	Chicago	L 83–97	Dwight Howard (28)	Dwight Howard (15)	Chris Duhon (4)	Amway Center; 18,912	5–3
9	January 8	@ Sacramento	W 104–97	Jason Richardson (22)	Dwight Howard (11)	Jameer Nelson (6)	Power Balance Pavilion; 14,150	6–3
10	January 11	@ Portland	W 107–104	JJ Redick (17)	Dwight Howard (13)	Hedo Türkoğlu (6)	Rose Garden; 20,467	7–3
11	January 12	@ Golden State	W 117–109	Dwight Howard (45)	Dwight Howard (23)	Hedo Türkoğlu (9)	Oracle Arena; 17,754	8–3
12	January 16	@ New York	W 102–93	Ryan Anderson (30)	Dwight Howard (10)	Jameer Nelson (7)	Madison Square Garden; 19,763	9–3
13	January 17	Charlotte	W 96–89	Dwight Howard (25)	Dwight Howard (17)	Dwight Howard, Jameer Nelson (4)	Amway Center; 18,846	10–3
14	January 18	San Antonio	L 83–85 (OT)	Dwight Howard (24)	Dwight Howard (25)	Jameer Nelson (5)	Amway Center; 18,846	10–4
15	January 20	L. A. Lakers	W 92–80	Dwight Howard (21)	Dwight Howard (23)	Jameer Nelson (9)	Amway Center; 18,846	11–4
16	January 23	@ Boston	L 56–87	Dwight Howard (18)	Dwight Howard (14)	Dwight Howard, Jameer Nelson (3)	TD Garden; 18,624	11–5
17	January 24	@ Indiana	W 102–83	Ryan Anderson (24)	Dwight Howard (9)	Hedo Türkoğlu (8)	Bankers Life Fieldhouse; 12,760	12–5
18	January 26	Boston	L 83–91	Dwight Howard (16)	Dwight Howard (16)	Hedo Türkoğlu (7)	Amway Center; 18,952	12–6
19	January 27	@ New Orleans	L 67–93	Dwight Howard (28)	Dwight Howard (16)	Chris Duhon (5)	New Orleans Arena; 16,176	12–7
20	January 29	Indiana	L 85–106	Dwight Howard (24)	Dwight Howard (13)	Hedo Türkoğlu (7)	Amway Center; 18,952	12–8
21	January 30	@ Philadelphia	L 69–74	Dwight Howard (17)	Ryan Anderson (20)	Quentin Richardson (3)	Wells Fargo Center; 16,299	12–9

February: 10–4 (home: 5–2; road: 5–2)

Game	Date	Team	Score	High points	High rebounds	High assists	Location Attendance	Record
22	February 1	Washington	W 109–103	Dwight Howard, Ryan Anderson (23)	Dwight Howard (18)	Hedo Türkoğlu (5)	Amway Center; 18,846	13–9
23	February 3	Cleveland	W 102–94	Dwight Howard, Jason Richardson (19)	Dwight Howard (16)	Chris Duhon (5)	Amway Center; 18,933	14–9
24	February 4	@ Indiana	W 85–81	Dwight Howard (27)	Hedo Türkoğlu (10)	Chris Duhon, Jason Richardson (5)	Bankers Life Fieldhouse; 18,165	15–9
25	February 6	L. A. Clippers	L 102–107 (OT)	Dwight Howard (33)	Dwight Howard (14)	Jameer Nelson (12)	Amway Center; 18,846	15–10
26	February 8	Miami	W 102–89	Ryan Anderson (27)	Dwight Howard (24)	Hedo Türkoğlu (7)	Amway Center; 18,972	16–10
27	February 10	Atlanta	L 87–89 (OT)	Ryan Anderson (21)	Dwight Howard (18)	Jameer Nelson (5)	Amway Center; 18,846	16–11
28	February 11	@ Milwaukee	W 99–94	Jason Richardson (31)	Dwight Howard (14)	Chris Duhon, Hedo Türkoğlu (7)	Bradley Center; 17,723	17–11
29	February 13	Minnesota	W 102–89	Jason Richardson (17)	Dwight Howard (7)	Hedo Türkoğlu (6)	Amway Center; 18,846	18–11
30	February 15	Philadelphia	W 103–87	Ryan Anderson (27)	Dwight Howard (14)	Jameer Nelson (14)	Amway Center; 18,846	19–11
31	February 17	Milwaukee	W 94–85	Dwight Howard (26)	Dwight Howard (20)	Hedo Türkoğlu (7)	Amway Center; 18,846	20–11
32	February 19	@ Miami	L 78–90	JJ Redick (17)	Dwight Howard (15)	Jameer Nelson (4)	American Airlines Arena; 20,185	20–12
33	February 20	@ Milwaukee	W 93–90	Dwight Howard (28)	Dwight Howard (16)	Jameer Nelson (5)	Bradley Center; 13,143	21–12
34	February 22	@ New Jersey	W 108–91	Dwight Howard (20)	Dwight Howard (17)	Jameer Nelson (7)	Prudential Center; 15,364	22–12
35	February 23	@ Atlanta	L 78–83	JJ Redick (13)	Dwight Howard (12)	Chris Duhon, Ish Smith, Hedo Türkoğlu (4)	Philips Arena; 14,523	22–13
All-Star Break
36	February 29	@ Washington	W 102–95	Ryan Anderson (23)	Ryan Anderson (15)	Hedo Türkoğlu (6)	Verizon Center; 18,688	23–13

March: 9–7 (home: 6–3; road: 3–4)

Game	Date	Team	Score	High points	High rebounds	High assists	Location Attendance	Record
37	March 1	Oklahoma City	L 102–105	Dwight Howard (33)	Dwight Howard (9)	Jameer Nelson (9)	Amway Center; 18,846	23–14
38	March 3	Milwaukee	W 114–98	Dwight Howard (28)	Dwight Howard (14)	Jameer Nelson (10)	Amway Center; 18,846	24–14
39	March 5	@ Toronto	W 92–88	Dwight Howard (36)	Ryan Anderson, Dwight Howard (13)	Hedo Türkoğlu (9)	Air Canada Centre; 15,392	25–14
50	March 6	@ Charlotte	L 84–100	Dwight Howard (15)	Dwight Howard (17)	Jameer Nelson (4)	Time Warner Cable Arena; 13,110	25–15
41	March 8	@ Chicago	W 99–94	Dwight Howard (29)	Dwight Howard (18)	Jameer Nelson (7)	United Center; 22,127	26–15
42	March 11	Indiana	W 107–94	Dwight Howard (30)	Dwight Howard (13)	JJ Redick (9)	Amway Center; 18,846	27–15
43	March 13	Miami	W 104–98 (OT)	Jameer Nelson (25)	Dwight Howard (25)	Hedo Türkoğlu (5)	Amway Center; 18,879	28–15
44	March 14	@ San Antonio	L 111–122	Jameer Nelson (25)	Dwight Howard (12)	Jameer Nelson (7)	AT&T Center; 18,581	28–16
45	March 16	New Jersey	W 86–70	Dwight Howard (18)	Dwight Howard (11)	Jameer Nelson, Hedo Türkoğlu (6)	Amway Center; 18,938	29–16
46	March 18	@ Miami	L 81–91	Dwight Howard (18)	Dwight Howard (11)	Jameer Nelson (6)	American Airlines Arena; 20,003	29–17
47	March 19	Chicago	L 59–85	Dwight Howard (18)	Dwight Howard (12)	Dwight Howard, JJ Redick, Jason Richardson (2)	Amway Center; 18,998	29–18
48	March 21	Phoenix	W 103–93	Ryan Anderson (29)	Dwight Howard (16)	Jason Richardson (5)	Amway Center; 18,930	30–18
49	March 23	Cleveland	W 93–80	Ryan Anderson (17)	Dwight Howard (13)	Jameer Nelson, Hedo Türkoğlu (7)	Amway Center; 18,846	31–18
50	March 26	@ Toronto	W 117–101	Ryan Anderson (28)	Dwight Howard (10)	Hedo Türkoğlu (8)	Air Canada Centre; 16,429	32–18
51	March 28	@ New York	L 86–108	Jameer Nelson (17)	Glen Davis (6)	Jameer Nelson (4)	Madison Square Garden; 19,763	32–19
52	March 30	Dallas	L 98–100	Jameer Nelson (24)	Dwight Howard (15)	Jameer Nelson, Hedo Türkoğlu (4)	Amway Center; 18,951	32–20

April: 5–9 (home: 3–3; road: 2–6)

Game	Date	Team	Score	High points	High rebounds	High assists	Location Attendance	Record
53	April 1	Denver	L 101–104	Jameer Nelson (27)	Glen Davis (16)	Jameer Nelson (5)	Amway Center; 18,951	32–21
54	April 3	@ Detroit	L 95–102	Glen Davis (31)	Glen Davis (10)	Chris Duhon (5)	The Palace of Auburn Hills; 16,741	32–22
55	April 5	New York	L 80–96	Jason Richardson (16)	Dwight Howard (8)	Jameer Nelson (5)	Amway Center; 19,098	32–23
56	April 7	@ Philadelphia	W 88–82	Glen Davis (23)	Dwight Howard (22)	Dwight Howard (6)	Wells Fargo Center; 19,775	33–23
57	April 9	Detroit	W 119–89	Jason Richardson (22)	Glen Davis (16)	Jameer Nelson (9)	Amway Center; 18,998	34–23
58	April 10	@ Washington	L 85–93	Jameer Nelson (19)	Glen Davis (10)	Jameer Nelson (7)	Verizon Center; 15,355	34–24
59	April 13	Atlanta	L 81–109	Glen Davis, Von Wafer (16)	Glen Davis (9)	Jameer Nelson, Von Wafer (4)	Amway Center; 18,846	34–25
60	April 15	@ Cleveland	W 100–84	Jameer Nelson (21)	Ryan Anderson (13)	Jameer Nelson (9)	Quicken Loans Arena; 16,305	35–25
61	April 16	Philadelphia	W 113–100	Ryan Anderson (26)	Ryan Anderson (16)	Jameer Nelson (13)	Amway Center; 18,846	36–25
62	April 18	@ Boston	L 98–102	Glen Davis (27)	Ryan Anderson (9)	Jameer Nelson (9)	TD Garden; 18,624	36–26
63	April 21	@ Utah	L 107–117 (OT)	Jameer Nelson (23)	Glen Davis (13)	Jameer Nelson (11)	EnergySolutions Arena; 19,580	36–27
64	April 22	@ Denver	L 74–101	Ryan Anderson (24)	Ryan Anderson (9)	Jason Richardson, Von Wafer (4)	Pepsi Center; 19,155	36–28
65	April 25	Charlotte	W 102–95	JJ Redick (31)	Ryan Anderson (13)	Jameer Nelson (9)	Amway Center; 19,152	37–28
66	April 26	@ Memphis	L 76–88	Hedo Türkoğlu (18)	Earl Clark (9)	Chris Duhon, Daniel Orton, Ish Smith (3)	FedExForum; 17,215	37–29

2011–12 season schedule

== Playoffs ==
=== Game log ===
2012 playoff game log
First round: 1–4 (home: 0–2; road: 1–2)

Game	Date	Team	Score	High points	High rebounds	High assists	Location Attendance	Series
1	April 28	@ Indiana	W 81–77	Jameer Nelson, Jason Richardson (17)	Glen Davis (13)	Jameer Nelson (9)	Bankers Life Fieldhouse; 18,165	1–0
2	April 30	@ Indiana	L 78–93	Glen Davis (18)	Glen Davis (10)	Jameer Nelson, JJ Redick, Jason Richardson (3)	Bankers Life Fieldhouse; 18,165	1–1
3	May 2	Indiana	L 74–97	Glen Davis (22)	Quentin Richardson (10)	Jameer Nelson (5)	Amway Center; 18,846	1–2
4	May 5	Indiana	L 99–101 (OT)	Jason Richardson (25)	Glen Davis (11)	Jameer Nelson (11)	Amway Center; 18,846	1–3
5	May 8	@ Indiana	L 87–105	Jameer Nelson (27)	Glen Davis (8)	Jameer Nelson (5)	Bankers Life Fieldhouse; 18,165	1–4

2012 playoff schedule

== Player statistics ==
=== Regular season ===
Player	POS	GP	GS	MP	REB	AST	STL	BLK	PTS	MPG	RPG	APG	SPG	BPG	PPG
JJ Redick	SG	65	22	1,765	150	164	27	6	751	27.2	2.3	2.5	.4	.1	11.6
Chris Duhon	PG	63	9	1,226	102	151	35	9	237	19.5	1.6	2.4	.6	.1	3.8
Ryan Anderson	PF	61	61	1,964	471	54	50	26	980	32.2	7.7	.9	.8	.4	16.1
Glen Davis	PF	61	13	1,427	331	47	43	19	566	23.4	5.4	.8	.7	.3	9.3
Jameer Nelson	PG	57	57	1,706	181	325	38	5	676	29.9	3.2	5.7	.7	.1	11.9
Dwight Howard	C	54	54	2,070	785	104	81	116	1,113	38.3	14.5	1.9	1.5	2.1	20.6
Jason Richardson	SG	54	54	1,591	194	107	53	22	629	29.5	3.6	2.0	1.0	.4	11.6
Hedo Türkoğlu	SF	53	53	1,653	199	233	45	17	576	31.2	3.8	4.4	.8	.3	10.9
Quentin Richardson	SF	48	3	866	123	38	28	6	215	18.0	2.6	.8	.6	.1	4.5
Earl Clark	PF	45	1	559	124	18	12	32	123	12.4	2.8	.4	.3	.7	2.7
Von Wafer	SG	33	1	469	45	29	10	3	194	14.2	1.4	.9	.3	.1	5.9
Ish Smith^{†}	PG	20	0	171	26	32	11	2	45	8.6	1.3	1.6	.6	.1	2.3
DeAndre Liggins	SF	17	0	115	15	5	6	0	33	6.8	.9	.3	.4	.0	1.9
Daniel Orton	PF	16	2	187	39	5	8	9	45	11.7	2.4	.3	.5	.6	2.8
Justin Harper	PF	14	0	84	12	2	2	3	20	6.0	.9	.1	.1	.2	1.4
Larry Hughes	PG	9	0	114	5	7	2	0	12	12.7	.6	.8	.2	.0	1.3

- ^{†} Denotes player spent time with another team in the season. Stats reflect time with the Magic only.

=== Playoffs ===
Player	POS	GP	GS	MP	REB	AST	STL	BLK	PTS	MPG	RPG	APG	SPG	BPG	PPG
Glen Davis	PF	5	5	190	46	4	3	6	95	38.0	9.2	.8	.6	1.2	19.0
Jameer Nelson	PG	5	5	182	19	33	4	1	78	36.4	3.8	6.6	.8	.2	15.6
Ryan Anderson	PF	5	5	172	23	4	3	2	48	34.4	4.6	.8	.6	.4	9.6
Hedo Türkoğlu	SF	5	5	162	14	12	5	4	42	32.4	2.8	2.4	1.0	.8	8.4
Jason Richardson	SG	5	5	148	19	5	6	2	57	29.6	3.8	1.0	1.2	.4	11.4
JJ Redick	SG	5	0	123	5	16	1	0	54	24.6	1.0	3.2	.2	.0	10.8
Earl Clark	PF	5	0	88	33	1	2	5	20	17.6	6.6	.2	.4	1.0	4.0
Quentin Richardson	SF	5	0	74	22	2	1	0	12	14.8	4.4	.4	.2	.0	2.4
Chris Duhon	PG	5	0	61	7	9	5	1	3	12.2	1.4	1.8	1.0	.2	.6
Daniel Orton	PF	4	0	9	2	0	0	0	4	2.3	.5	.0	.0	.0	1.0
Von Wafer	SG	1	0	6	1	0	0	0	6	6.0	1.0	.0	.0	.0	6.0
Justin Harper	PF	1	0	5	0	0	0	0	0	5.0	.0	.0	.0	.0	.0
Ish Smith	PG	1	0	5	1	0	0	1	0	5.0	1.0	.0	.0	1.0	.0

== Awards and records ==
- Ryan Anderson won the NBA Most Improved Player Award.
- Dwight Howard was selected to the All-NBA First Team and NBA All-Defensive First Team and was named Eastern Conference Player of the Week (January 16 – January 22).
- Dwight Howard attempted a record 39 free throws against the Golden State Warriors, breaking Wilt Chamberlain's record of 34 set in 1962.

=== All-Star ===
- Dwight Howard made his sixth All-Star appearance at the 2012 NBA All-Star Game held in Orlando.
- Ryan Anderson participated in the Three-Point Contest.
- Jameer Nelson participated in the Shooting Stars Competition along Phoenix Mercury player Marie Ferdinand-Harris and former Orlando Magic player Dennis Scott.

== Injuries and disciplinary actions ==
- Hedo Türkoğlu underwent surgery to repair a facial fracture sustained during a game against the New York Knicks on April 5 and missed the remainder of the regular season.
- Glen Davis was suspended 2 games by the team for conduct detrimental to the team. A month later he was fined US$35,000 by the league for making an obscene gesture in a game against the Toronto Raptors.
- Hedo Türkoğlu was suspended 1 game by the league for making intentional contact with an official during a game against the Chicago Bulls.
- Chris Duhon was suspended 1 game by the team for violating team rules.
- In April, Dwight Howard underwent surgery to repair a herniated disc in his back and was out for the remainder of the season.

== Transactions ==
=== Overview ===
Players Added

Via draft

- DeAndre Liggins

Via free agency

- Larry Hughes
- Ish Smith

Via trade

- Glen Davis
- Justin Harper
- Von Wafer
Players Lost

Via trade

- Brandon Bass

Waived

- Gilbert Arenas
- Larry Hughes

=== Trades ===
June 23, 2011	To Orlando Magic Draft rights to Justin Harper	To Cleveland Cavaliers Conditional 2012 and 2013 second round picks.
December 12, 2011	To Orlando Magic Glen Davis (sign and trade); Von Wafer (sign and trade)	To Boston Celtics Brandon Bass

=== Free agents ===
Additions
Player	Date signed	Former team
Larry Hughes	December 9	
Ish Smith	February 2	Los Angeles D-Fenders (D-League

Many players signed with teams from other leagues due to the 2011 NBA lockout. FIBA allows players under NBA contracts to sign and play for teams from other leagues if the contracts have opt-out clauses that allow the players to return to the NBA if the lockout ends. The Chinese Basketball Association, however, only allows its clubs to sign foreign free agents who could play for at least the entire season.

Played in other leagues during lockout
Player	Date signed	New team	Opt-out clause
Earl Clark	August 10	Zhejiang Lions (China)	No
Justin Harper	August 19	Strasbourg IG (France)	Yes
