= Hank Thorns =

American professional basketball player (born 1989)

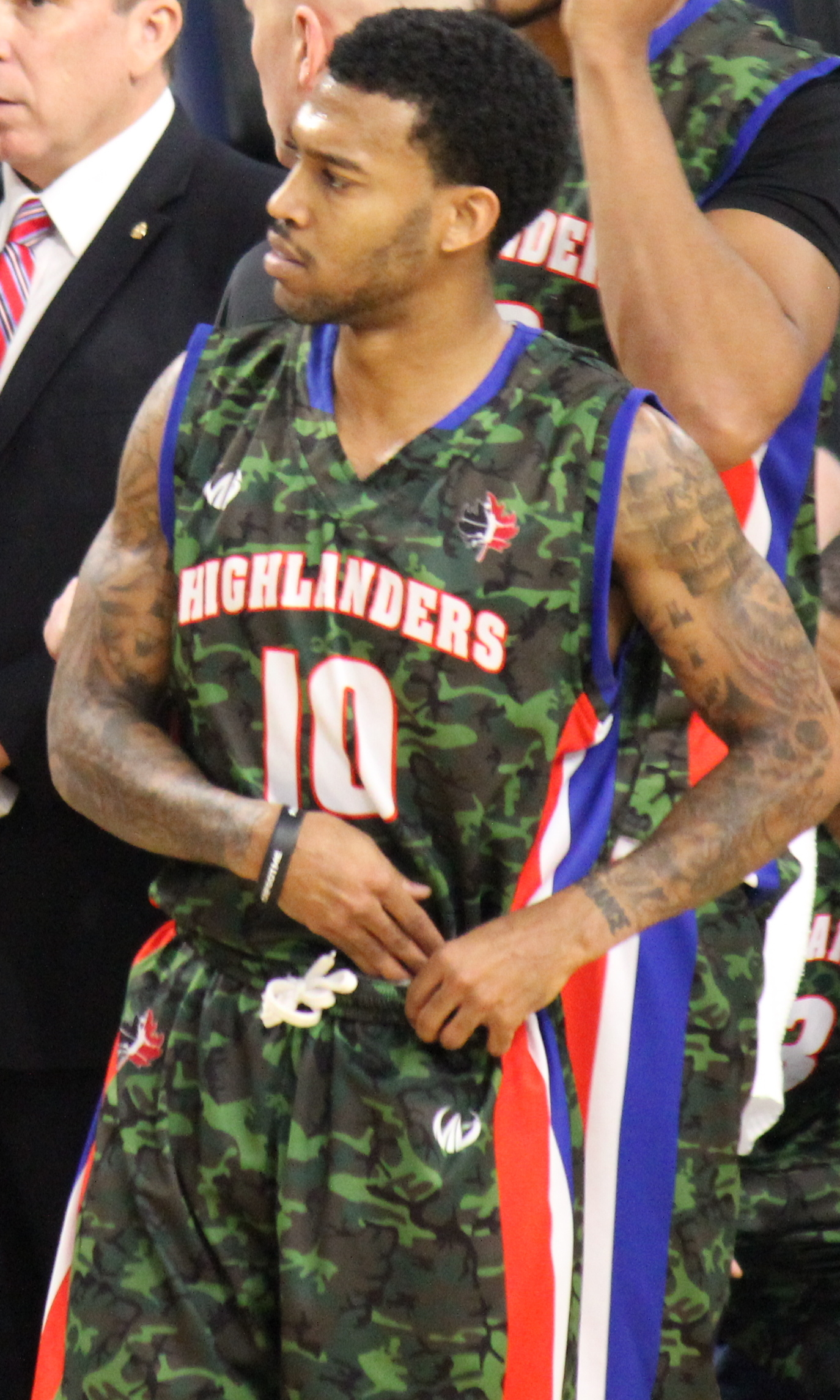
- Thorns with the Cape Breton Highlanders in 2016

Personal information
- Born: January 11, 1989 (age 37) Las Vegas, Nevada, U.S.
- Listed height: 5 ft 9 in (1.75 m)
- Listed weight: 165 lb (75 kg)

Career information
- High school: Valley (Winchester, Nevada)
- College: Virginia Tech (2007–2009); TCU (2010–2012)
- NBA draft: 2012: undrafted
- Playing career: 2012–2017
- Position: Point guard

Career history
- 2012–2013: Maine Red Claws
- 2013: Mornar Bar
- 2014: Ostioneros de Guaymas
- 2016–2017: Cape Breton Highlanders

Career highlights
- First-team All-MWC (2012); Second-team All-MWC (2011)
- Stats at Basketball Reference

Hank Thorns (born January 11, 1989) is an American professional basketball player who last played for the Cape Breton Highlanders of the National Basketball League of Canada (NBL). He played college basketball at Texas Christian University, after transferring from Virginia Tech in 2009.

== College career ==
Thorns played his first two seasons of college basketball at Virginia Tech. Thorns was among the top players in the Mountain West in 2011–12 as a senior at TCU. He earned a spot on the Mountain West Conference First Team in 2012, a year after a second team finish as a junior.

== Professional career ==
On September 25, 2013, he signed with the Los Angeles Clippers of the National Basketball Association (NBA). However, he was waived on October 25.

On December 24, 2012, Thorns signed with the Maine Red Claws. He was waived on February 7, 2013. Later that month, he signed with Mornar Bar of Montenegro and finished off the season with the team.

On October 25, 2016, Thorns signed with the Cape Breton Highlanders in the NBL Canada. Team manager Tyrone Levingston praised the signee, saying, "The point guard role is key to the success of any team, and I look forward to seeing what Hank is going to bring to that role."

== Personal ==
Thorns is the cousin of former Tennessee Volunteers basketball star and current NBA player C. J. Watson.
