= Oscar Bellfield =

American professional basketball player

Free agent
- Position: Point guard

Personal information
- Born: January 11, 1990 (age 36) Los Angeles, California
- Listed height: 6 ft 2 in (1.88 m)
- Listed weight: 190 lb (86 kg)

Career information
- High school: Westchester (Los Angeles, California)
- College: UNLV (2008–2012)
- NBA draft: 2012: undrafted
- Playing career: 2012–present

Career history
- 2012: Erie BayHawks
- 2013: Panteras de Miranda
- 2013: Skallagrímur

Oscar Jermaine Bellfield (born January 11, 1990) is an American professional basketball player. He played college basketball for UNLV and played in the 2012 NBA Summer League for the Memphis Grizzlies. He then signed with the New York Knicks, but was waived at the end of the preseason.

In November 2012, Bellfield joined the Erie BayHawks for the 2012–13 season as an affiliate player. He was waived by the BayHawks on December 28, 2012. In March 2013, he signed with Panteras de Miranda in Venezuela.
