= Ryan Anderson (basketball, born 1988) =

American basketball player

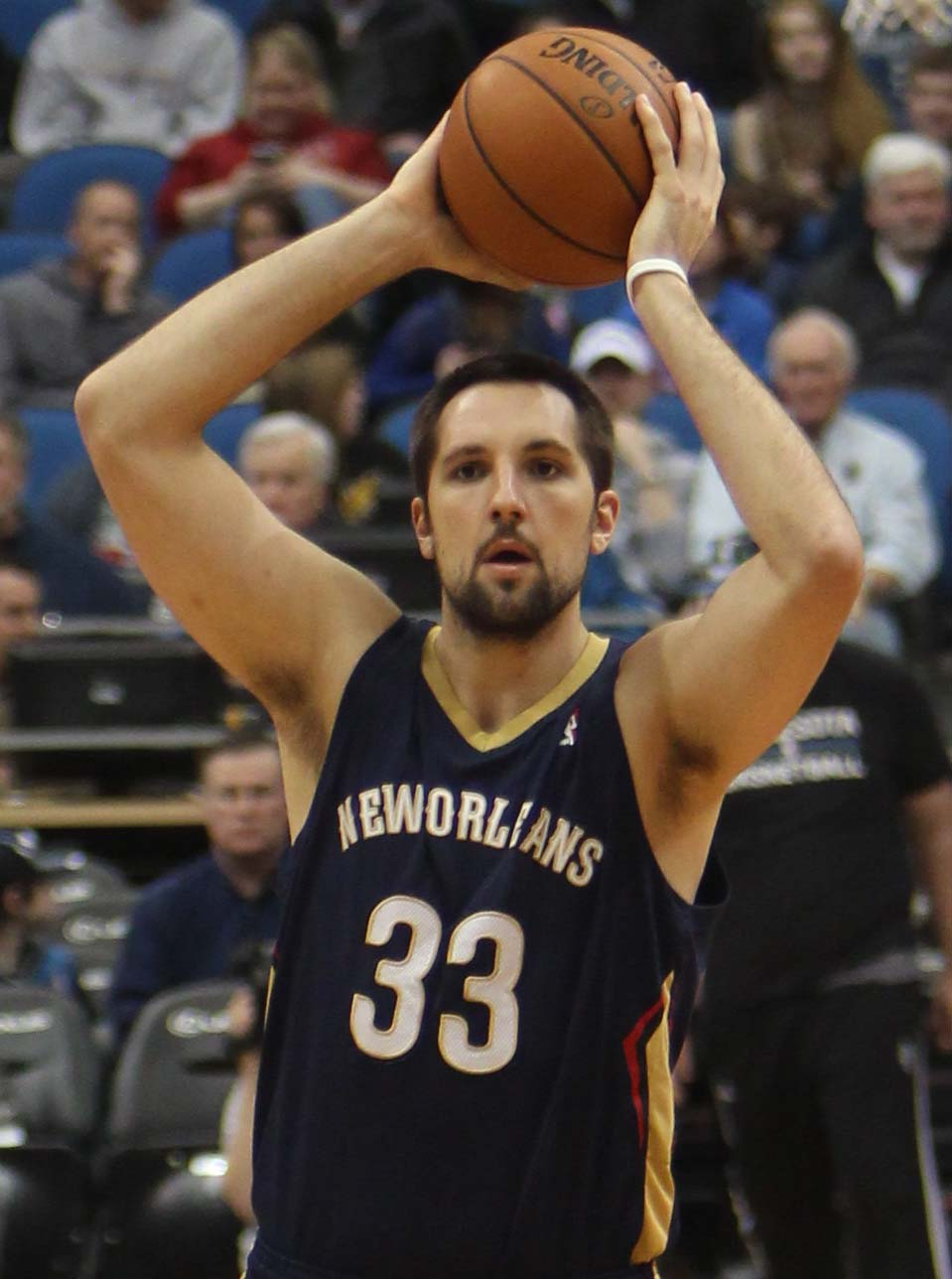
- Anderson with the New Orleans Pelicans in 2014

Personal information
- Born: May 6, 1988 (age 37) Sacramento, California, U.S.
- Listed height: 6 ft 9 in (2.06 m)
- Listed weight: 240 lb (109 kg)

Career information
- High school: Oak Ridge (El Dorado Hills, California)
- College: California (2006–2008)
- NBA draft: 2008: 1st round, 21st overall pick
- Drafted by: New Jersey Nets
- Playing career: 2008–2019
- Position: Power forward

Career history
- 2008–2009: New Jersey Nets
- 2009–2012: Orlando Magic
- 2012–2016: New Orleans Hornets / Pelicans
- 2016–2018: Houston Rockets
- 2018–2019: Phoenix Suns
- 2019: Miami Heat
- 2019: Houston Rockets

Career highlights
- NBA Most Improved Player (2012); Second-team All-American – SN (2008); First-team All-Pac-10 (2008)
- Stats at NBA.com
- Stats at Basketball Reference

Ryan James Anderson (born May 6, 1988) is an American former professional basketball player. He played college basketball for the California Golden Bears.

Anderson was selected with the 21st overall pick in the 2008 NBA draft by the New Jersey Nets, who traded him to the Orlando Magic in June 2009. With the Magic, he received the NBA Most Improved Player Award in 2012. In July 2012, Anderson was traded to the New Orleans Hornets, who changed their name to the Pelicans in April 2013. In July 2016, he signed with the Houston Rockets as a free agent and was dealt to the Phoenix Suns in August 2018. Anderson was traded to the Miami Heat in February 2019 and returned to the Rockets in September of the same year before being waived two months later.

== Early life ==
Anderson was born in Sacramento, California and attended Oak Ridge High School in nearby El Dorado Hills. His parents are Jack Anderson and Sue Anderson and he is very close to his grandparents.

== High school career ==
In 2005, Anderson helped lead the Oak Ridge Trojans to the Division II California State Championship. The game was held at ARCO Arena in Sacramento. In the opening round of that playoff series, Anderson's No. 1 ranked team narrowly averted an upset against a John H. Pitman High School team led by Colin Kaepernick, who would later go on to become an NFL quarterback for the San Francisco 49ers. In that game, Kaepernick scored 34 points while Anderson scored 50.

Considered a four-star recruit by Rivals.com, Anderson was listed as the No. 22 power forward and the No. 98 player in the nation in 2006.

== College career ==
Anderson played two seasons for the California Golden Bears at UC Berkeley, averaging 18.7 points and 9.0 rebounds in 33.0 minutes per game in 66 career games. As a freshman in 2006–07, he led the Bears in scoring and rebounding, averaging 16.3 points and 8.2 rebounds, and earned Honorable Mention All-Pac-10 honors. He went on to be named Second Team All-America by The Sporting News and earned First Team All-Pac-10 honors as a sophomore in 2007–08. He led the Pac-10 in scoring, averaging 21.1 points (ranked 18th in nation) and ranked third in rebounding, pulling down 9.9 rebounds per game.

On April 3, 2008, Anderson declared for the NBA draft, forgoing his final two years of college eligibility.

== Professional career ==
=== New Jersey Nets (2008–2009) ===
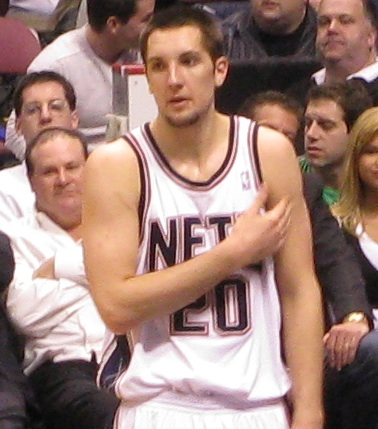
Anderson with the Nets in 2009

On June 26, 2008, Anderson was selected with the 21st overall pick in the 2008 NBA draft by the New Jersey Nets. He made his NBA debut on October 29, 2008, against the Washington Wizards. He played in 66 games during his rookie campaign with New Jersey, averaging 7.4 points and 4.7 rebounds in 19.9 minutes per game, as he ranked 10th among all NBA rookies in three-point field-goal percentage (.365 – 69-of-189).

=== Orlando Magic (2009–2012) ===
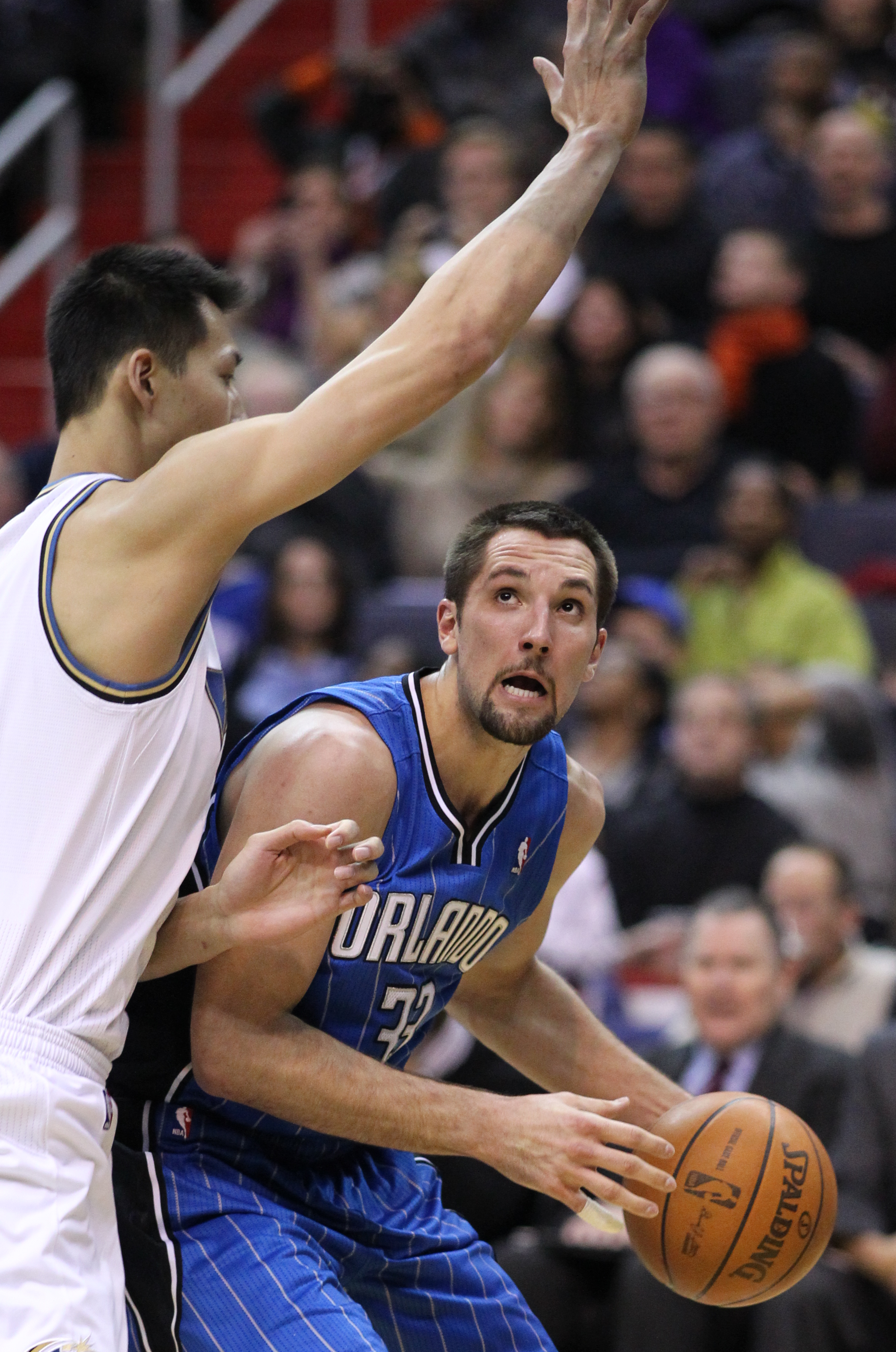
Anderson with the Magic in 2010

On June 25, 2009, Anderson was traded, along with Vince Carter, to the Orlando Magic in exchange for Rafer Alston, Tony Battie and Courtney Lee. In 2009–10, he appeared in 63 games with Orlando, averaging 7.7 points and 3.2 rebounds in 14.5 minutes per game. He started in six games during the regular season, and played in a further nine playoff games.

In 2010–11, Anderson played in 64 games (14 starts) with Orlando, averaging 10.6 points and 5.5 rebounds in 22.3 minutes per game. During December 2010, he missed nine games due to a sprained right foot.

In the lockout-shortened 2011–12 season, Anderson won the NBA Most Improved Player Award after averaging 16.1 points and 7.7 rebounds in 61 games. He led the NBA in both three-point field goals made and attempted, while ranking seventh in free throw percentage, tied for 27th in three-point field goal percentage, ranking 29th in rebounding and 33rd in scoring.

=== New Orleans Hornets / Pelicans (2012–2016) ===
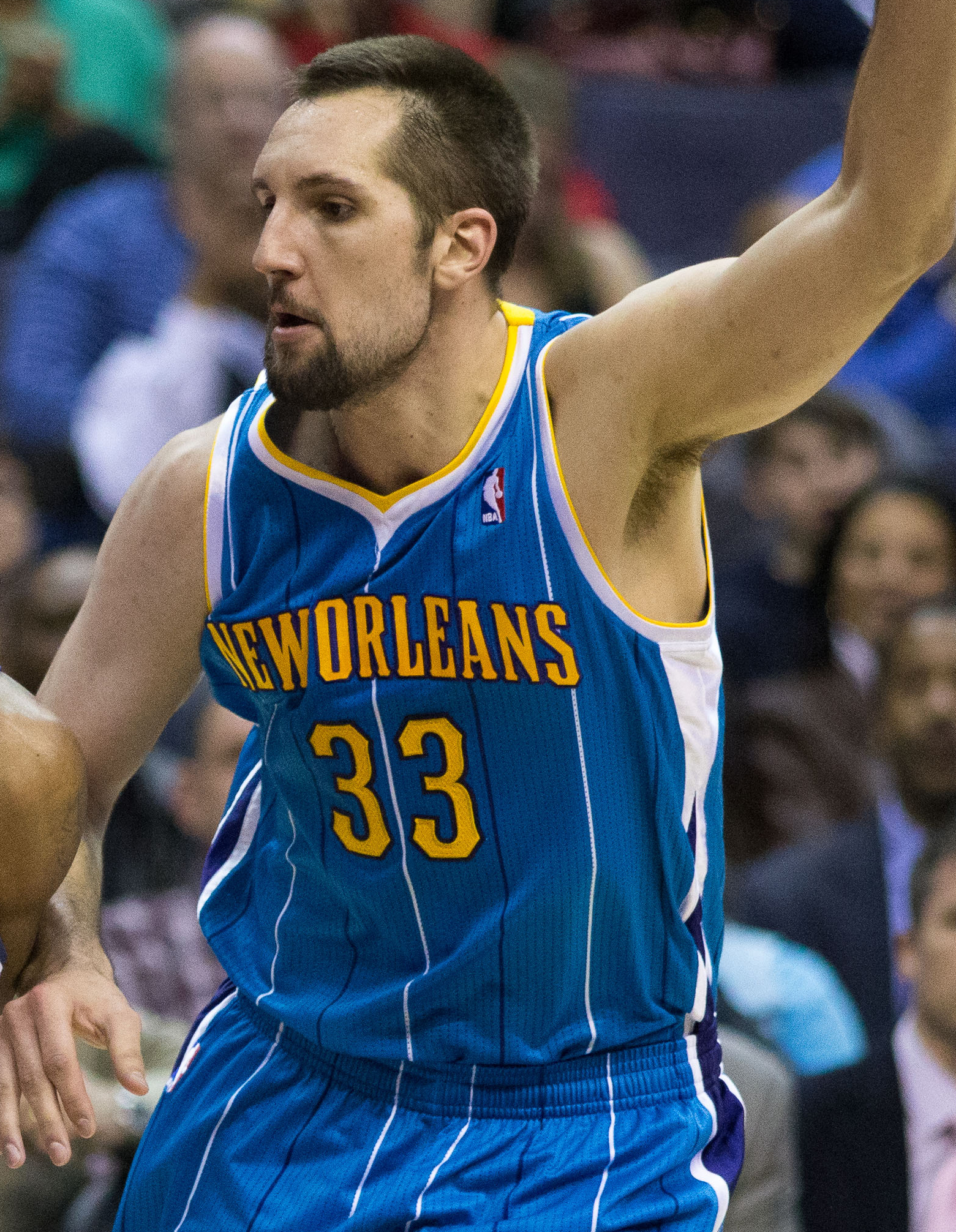
Anderson with the Hornets in 2013

On July 11, 2012, Anderson was acquired by the New Orleans Hornets in a sign-and-trade deal that sent Gustavo Ayón to the Magic. During his first season for the Hornets in 2012–13, he appeared in 81 games (22 starts) and averaged 16.2 points, 6.4 rebounds and 1.2 assists per game. He finished second in the NBA with a career-high 213 three-point field goals made in 557 attempts (38.2%). In April 2013, the Hornets changed their name to the Pelicans.

On December 2, 2013, Anderson scored a career-high 36 points in a 131–128 triple overtime win over the Chicago Bulls. On January 3, 2014, Anderson suffered a neck injury colliding with Gerald Wallace in the Pelicans' 95–92 win over the Boston Celtics. Anderson, who had to be removed from the court on a stretcher, required neck surgery and was ruled out for the rest of the season in late March. He managed just 22 games in 2013–14, averaging 19.8 points and 6.5 rebounds per game.

On October 28, 2014, Anderson made his return for the Pelicans in their season-opening game against the Orlando Magic. In 22 minutes of action, he recorded 22 points and 9 rebounds off the bench in a 101–84 win. On February 22, 2015, he was ruled out for two to four weeks after being diagnosed with an MCL sprain in his right knee. He returned to action on April 1 and played out the regular season, and appeared in the team's four playoff games.

Anderson continued to be an effective role player off the bench for the Pelicans in 2015–16. On January 15, 2016, he scored a then season-high 32 points and hit six three-pointers in a 109–107 win over the Charlotte Hornets. On January 23, he scored 23 points and tied a season high with six three-pointers in a 116–99 win over the Milwaukee Bucks. In that game, the Pelicans hit a franchise-best 17 three-pointers. On January 28, he scored 30 of his career high-tying 36 points in the first half of the Pelicans' 114–105 win over the Sacramento Kings. Starting in just his seventh game of the season, at power forward in place of the injured Anthony Davis, Anderson's 30 first half points set a franchise record. After being diagnosed with a sports hernia in late March, Anderson missed the team's final 14 games of the season.

=== Houston Rockets (2016–2018) ===
On July 9, 2016, Anderson signed with the Houston Rockets. He made his debut for the Rockets in their season opener on October 26, recording 14 points and six rebounds in a 120–114 loss to the Los Angeles Lakers. On December 1, he scored a season-high 29 points in a 132–127 double overtime win over the Golden State Warriors. On December 23, he set a new season high with 31 points in a 115–109 loss to the Memphis Grizzlies.

During the 2017 NBA playoffs, Anderson scored 19 points during a 110–107 overtime WCSF Game Five loss to the San Antonio Spurs. Houston eventually lost the series in six games.

During the 2017 offseason, the Rockets began working to move Anderson's large contract. To clear the way for a trade out of Houston during the 2018 offseason, Anderson agreed to reduce the guarantee on his $21 million salary in 2019–20 to $15.6 million.

=== Phoenix Suns (2018–2019) ===
On August 31, 2018, Anderson was traded alongside rookie guard De'Anthony Melton to the Phoenix Suns in exchange for Brandon Knight and Marquese Chriss.

=== Miami Heat (2019) ===
On February 6, 2019, Anderson was traded to the Miami Heat in exchange for Wayne Ellington and Tyler Johnson. On July 6, 2019, Anderson was waived by the Heat.

=== Return to Houston (2019) ===
On September 27, 2019, Anderson signed with the Houston Rockets, but was waived on November 18, 2019.

== NBA career statistics ==
Legend
GP	Games played	GS	Games started	MPG	Minutes per game
FG%	Field goal percentage	3P%	3-point field goal percentage	FT%	Free throw percentage
RPG	Rebounds per game	APG	Assists per game	SPG	Steals per game
BPG	Blocks per game	PPG	Points per game	**Bold**	Career high

=== Regular season ===
Year	Team	GP	GS	MPG	FG%	3P%	FT%	RPG	APG	SPG	BPG	PPG
2008–09	New Jersey	66	30	19.9	.393	.365	.845	4.7	.8	.7	.3	7.4
2009–10	Orlando	63	6	14.5	.436	.370	.866	3.2	.6	.4	.2	7.7
2010–11	Orlando	64	14	22.1	.430	.393	.812	5.5	.8	.5	**.6**	10.6
2011–12	Orlando	61	61	32.2	**.439**	.393	.877	**7.7**	.9	**.8**	.4	16.1
2012–13	New Orleans	**81**	22	30.9	.423	.382	.844	6.4	**1.2**	.5	.4	16.2
2013–14	New Orleans	22	14	**36.1**	.438	**.409**	**.952**	6.5	.8	.5	.3	**19.8**
2014–15	New Orleans	61	5	27.5	.399	.340	.854	4.8	.9	.5	.3	13.7
2015–16	New Orleans	66	7	30.4	.427	.366	.873	6.0	1.1	.6	.4	17.0
2016–17	Houston	72	**72**	29.4	.419	.404	.860	4.6	.9	.4	.2	13.6
2017–18	Houston	66	50	26.1	.431	.386	.774	5.0	.9	.4	.3	9.3
2018–19	Phoenix	15	8	18.5	.317	.206	.786	3.0	1.1	.2	.1	3.7
2018–19	Miami	10	0	4.4	.222	.333	.500	.9	.2	.1	.0	.7
2019–20	Houston	2	0	7.0	.286	.200	–	3.5	1.0	.5	.0	2.5
Career		649	289	25.8	.422	.380	.854	5.3	.9	.5	.3	12.3

=== Playoffs ===
Year	Team	GP	GS	MPG	FG%	3P%	FT%	RPG	APG	SPG	BPG	PPG
2010	Orlando	9	0	9.9	.310	.286	**1.000**	3.5	.3	.2	.2	2.6
2011	Orlando	6	0	24.5	.267	.300	**1.000**	4.5	.5	**.8**	.2	4.7
2012	Orlando	5	5	**34.4**	.341	.400	.857	4.6	.8	.6	.4	9.6
2015	New Orleans	4	0	23.8	**.444**	**.417**	**1.000**	4.3	**2.3**	.0	**.5**	**10.8**
2017	Houston	**11**	**9**	30.5	.391	.283	.875	**5.2**	.6	.4	.2	9.4
2018	Houston	**11**	0	8.6	.350	.333	–	1.2	.5	.3	.1	1.7
Career		46	14	20.3	.363	.325	.917	3.7	.7	.4	.2	5.7

== Personal life ==
Anderson was in a relationship with former Bachelor contestant and model Gia Allemand, who committed suicide in August 2013. He and former teammate Anthony Davis took 75 underprivileged children on a shopping spree at Toys-R-Us in 2014, and they donated 2,000 Pelicans tickets in 2015. Anderson's favorite television show is Family Guy. In 2017, he married Kari Klinkenborg who is an American actress and they have one child together.

== See also ==
- List of National Basketball Association career 3-point scoring leaders
