= Justin Harper (basketball) =

American basketball player (born 1989)

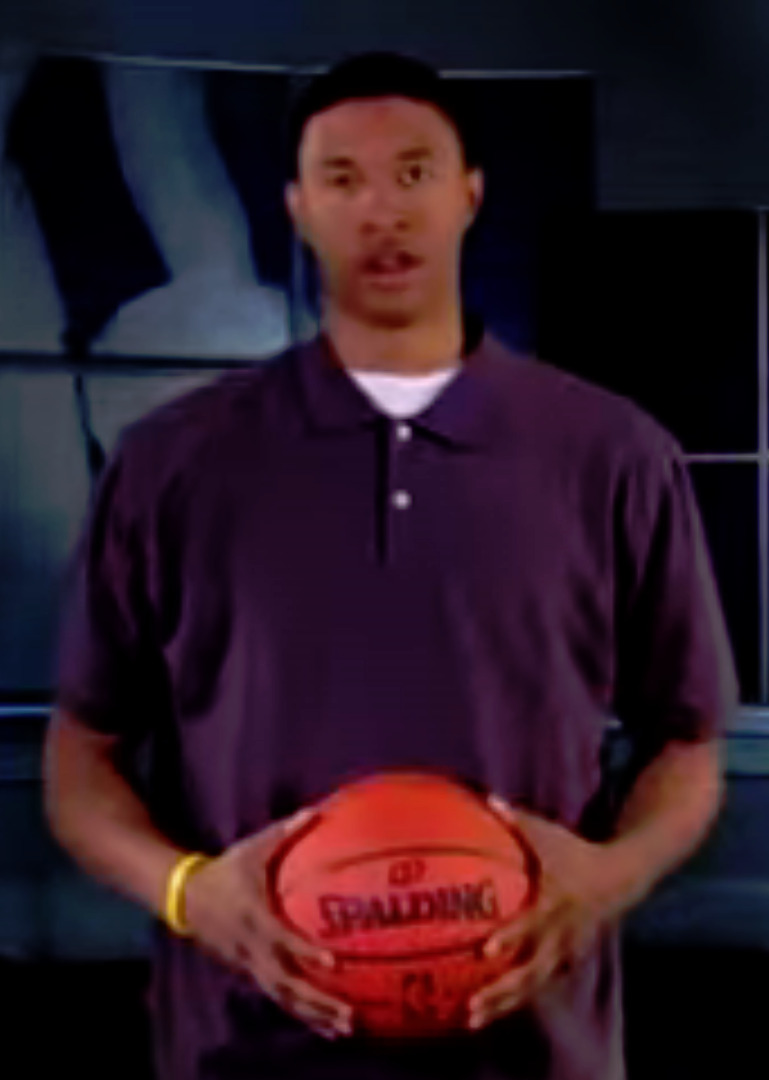
- Harper in 2011

Free agent
- Position: Power forward

Personal information
- Born: August 30, 1989 (age 36) Richmond, Virginia, U.S.
- Listed height: 6 ft 11 in (2.11 m)
- Listed weight: 225 lb (102 kg)

Career information
- High school: Meadowbrook (Richmond, Virginia)
- College: Richmond (2007–2011)
- NBA draft: 2011: 2nd round, 32nd overall pick
- Drafted by: Cleveland Cavaliers
- Playing career: 2011–present

Career history
- 2011: SIG Strasbourg
- 2011–2012: Orlando Magic
- 2012–2013: Idaho Stampede
- 2013–2014: Hapoel Tel Aviv
- 2014–2015: Sidigas Avellino
- 2015–2017: Los Angeles D-Fenders
- 2016: Detroit Pistons
- 2017: Philadelphia 76ers
- 2017: GlobalPort Batang Pier
- 2017–2018: ASVEL Basket
- 2018–2019: South Bay Lakers
- 2019: Indios de Mayagüez
- 2020–2022: Kyoto Hannaryz
- 2022–2024: Koshigaya Alphas
- 2024: Fighting Eagles Nagoya
- 2025: Utsunomiya Brex

Career highlights
- 2× NBA D-League All-Star (2016, 2017); First-team All-Atlantic 10 (2011)
- Stats at NBA.com
- Stats at Basketball Reference

Justin Oliver Harper (born August 30, 1989) is an American professional basketball player who last played for Utsunomiya Brex of the Japanese B. League. Harper played professionally in the NBA for various teams, including the Orlando Magic, Detroit Pistons, and Philadelphia 76ers. He played college basketball for the University of Richmond.

== College career ==
As a senior with Richmond, Harper averaged 17.9 points and 6.9 rebounds while shooting 53 percent from the field, and he was named to the first-team All-Atlantic 10, along with teammate Kevin Anderson. Harper was recognized as an All-Fourth District first-team selection by the National Association of Basketball Coaches.

== Professional career ==
Harper was selected with the 32nd overall pick in the 2011 NBA draft by the Cleveland Cavaliers, who subsequently traded his draft rights to the Orlando Magic. During the 2011 NBA lockout, Harper played in France for SIG Strasbourg of the Ligue Nationale de Basketball. On December 9, 2011, he signed with the Magic. On October 27, 2012, he was waived by the Magic.

On November 2, 2012, Harper was selected by the Idaho Stampede with the third overall pick in the 2012 NBA Development League draft. He played in 48 games for Idaho in 2012–13, averaging 11.7 points and 6.5 rebounds per game.

On October 5, 2013, Harper signed with Hapoel Tel Aviv of Israel for the 2013–14 season. On September 10, 2014, he signed with Sidigas Avellino of Italy for the 2014–15 season.

On September 18, 2015, Harper signed with the Brooklyn Nets. However, he was later waived by the Nets on October 26 after appearing in six preseason games. On November 16, he was acquired by the Los Angeles D-Fenders of the D-League. The following day, he made his debut for the D-Fenders in a 114–105 win over the Bakersfield Jam, recording seven points and one rebound in 13 minutes. On January 29, 2016, he was named in the West All-Star team for the 2016 NBA D-League All-Star Game.

On February 24, 2016, Harper signed a 10-day contract with the Detroit Pistons. That night, he made his debut for the Pistons in a 111–91 win over the Philadelphia 76ers, recording one point and one steal in five minutes off the bench. On March 5, he signed a second 10-day contract with the Pistons. On March 15, the Pistons decided not to sign him for the remainder of the season. He subsequently returned to the D-Fenders and played out the rest of the 2016–17 season with them.

Harper re-joined the D-Fenders for the 2016–17 season. On March 3, 2017, he signed a 10-day contract with the Philadelphia 76ers. After the 10-day contract expired, Harper was reacquired by the D-Fenders.

Harper re-joined the D-Fenders, this time re-branded as the South Bay Lakers.

On April 25, 2019, Harper joined Indios de Mayagüez.

On August 25, 2020, Harper signed with Kyoto Hannaryz of the B.League. On June 16, 2021, Harper re-signed with Kyoto Hannaryz. On July 1, 2022, Harper signed with Koshigaya Alphas of the B.League. On May 29, 2023, Harper re-signed with Koshigaya Alphas. On September 18, 2024, Harper signed with Fighting Eagles Nagoya of the B.League. On November 15, Harper left Fighting Eagles Nagoya.

== Career statistics ==
Legend
GP	Games played	GS	Games started	MPG	Minutes per game
FG%	Field goal percentage	3P%	3-point field goal percentage	FT%	Free throw percentage
RPG	Rebounds per game	APG	Assists per game	SPG	Steals per game
BPG	Blocks per game	PPG	Points per game	**Bold**	Career high

=== NBA ===
==== Regular season ====
Year	Team	GP	GS	MPG	FG%	3P%	FT%	RPG	APG	SPG	BPG	PPG
2011–12	Orlando	**14**	0	6.0	.290	.154	.000	**.9**	**.1**	.1	**.2**	1.4
2015–16	Detroit	5	0	7.0	.400	**.444**	**.500**	.2	.0	.2	.0	2.6
2016–17	Philadelphia	3	0	**10.0**	**.417**	.286	.000	**2.0**	.0	**.7**	.0	**4.0**
Career		22	0	6.8	.340	.276	.333	.9	.2	.1	.1	2.0

==== Playoffs ====
Year	Team	GP	GS	MPG	FG%	3P%	FT%	RPG	APG	SPG	BPG	PPG
2012	Orlando	1	0	5.0	.000	.000	.000	.0	.0	.0	.0	.0
Career		1	0	5.0	.000	.000	.000	.0	.0	.0	.0	.0

=== Japan ===
==== Regular season ====
Year	Team	GP	GS	MPG	FG%	3P%	FT%	RPG	APG	SPG	BPG	PPG
2020–21	Kyoto	34	30	25.4	.494	**.377**	**.800**	6.6	1.2	**.6**	.5	12.7
2021–22	Kyoto	**54**	**53**	**32.4**	**.512**	**.377**	.733	**8.5**	**1.7**	**.6**	**.6**	**19.1**

Source: basketball-stats.de (Date: May 27, 2022)
