= 2011–12 Portland Trail Blazers season =

NBA professional basketball team season

- Head coach: Nate McMillan (fired); Kaleb Canales (interim)
- General manager: Chad Buchanan
- Owner: Paul Allen
- Arena: Rose Garden

Results
- Record: 28–38 (.424)
- Place: Division: 4th (Northwest); Conference: 11th (Western)
- Playoff finish: Did not qualify
- Stats at Basketball Reference

Local media
- Television: KGW; CSN Northwest
- Radio: KXTG

The 2011–12 Portland Trail Blazers season was the 42nd season of the franchise in the National Basketball Association (NBA). Due to the 2011 NBA lockout the regular season was shortened to 66 games. The Trail Blazers finished the season in 11th place in the Western Conference with a 28–38 record. It was the last season with head coach Nate McMillan, who was fired on March and with starting shooting guard Brandon Roy, who announced his retirement. The Trail Blazers also parted ways with their number one pick from the 2007 NBA draft Greg Oden after an injury-marred short career with the team.

== Key dates ==
- June 23: The 2011 NBA draft took place at the Prudential Center in Newark, New Jersey.

== Draft ==
Round	Pick	Player	Position	Nationality	School
1	21	Nolan Smith	PG/SG	United States	Duke
2	51	Jon Diebler	SG	United States	Ohio State

== Roster ==
2011–12 Portland Trail Blazers roster
Players

Pos.	No.	Player	Height	Weight	DOB	From
F	12	LaMarcus Aldridge	6 ft 11 in (2.11 m)	240 lb (109 kg)	1985–07–19	Texas
F	8	Luke Babbitt	6 ft 9 in (2.06 m)	225 lb (102 kg)	1989–06–20	Nevada
F	88	Nicolas Batum	6 ft 8 in (2.03 m)	200 lb (91 kg)	1988–12–14	France
G	11	Jamal Crawford	6 ft 5 in (1.96 m)	200 lb (91 kg)	1980–03–20	Michigan
G	5	Raymond Felton	6 ft 1 in (1.85 m)	205 lb (93 kg)	1984–06–26	North Carolina
G	3	Jonny Flynn	6 ft 0 in (1.83 m)	185 lb (84 kg)	1989–02–06	Syracuse
F	21	J. J. Hickson	6 ft 9 in (2.06 m)	242 lb (110 kg)	1988–09–04	NC State
G	2	Wesley Matthews	6 ft 5 in (1.96 m)	220 lb (100 kg)	1986–10–14	Marquette
C	10	Joel Przybilla	7 ft 1 in (2.16 m)	245 lb (111 kg)	1979–10–10	Minnesota
F	83	Craig Smith	6 ft 7 in (2.01 m)	265 lb (120 kg)	1983–11–10	Boston College
G	4	Nolan Smith	6 ft 2 in (1.88 m)	185 lb (84 kg)	1988–07–25	Duke
C	34	Hasheem Thabeet	7 ft 3 in (2.21 m)	263 lb (119 kg)	1987–02–16	Connecticut
F/C	40	Kurt Thomas	6 ft 9 in (2.06 m)	230 lb (104 kg)	1972–10–04	TCU
G	9	Elliot Williams	6 ft 5 in (1.96 m)	180 lb (82 kg)	1989–06–20	Memphis
F	7	Shawne Williams	6 ft 9 in (2.06 m)	230 lb (104 kg)	1986–02–16	Memphis

Coaches
Head coach
- Nate McMillan
- Kaleb Canales
Assistant(s)
- Bernie Bickerstaff
- Larry Greer
- Bob Ociepka
- Buck Williams

Legend
- (DP) Unsigned draft pick
- (FA) Free agent
- (S) Suspended
- Injured

== Pre-season ==
=== Game log ===
2011 pre-season game log
Pre-season: 1–1 (home: 1–0; road: 0–1)

Game	Date	Team	Score	High points	High rebounds	High assists	Location Attendance	Record
1	December 19	Utah	W 110–90	Wesley Matthews (17)	Chris Johnson (6)	Jamal Crawford (7)	Rose Garden	1–0
2	December 21	@ Utah	L 89–92	Raymond Felton (17)	LaMarcus Aldridge (11)	Jamal Crawford (5)	EnergySolutions Arena	1–1

2011–12 season schedule

== Regular season ==
=== Standings ===
Northwest Division	W	L	PCT	GB	Home	Road	Div	GP
y-Oklahoma City Thunder	47	19	.712	–	26‍–‍7	21‍–‍12	10–3	66
x-Denver Nuggets	38	28	.576	9.0	20‍–‍13	18‍–‍15	6–7	66
x-Utah Jazz	36	30	.545	11.0	25‍–‍8	11‍–‍22	9–4	66
Portland Trail Blazers	28	38	.424	19.0	20‍–‍13	8‍–‍25	4–10	66
Minnesota Timberwolves	26	40	.394	21.0	13‍–‍20	13‍–‍20	4–9	66

Western Conference
#	Team	W	L	PCT	GB	GP
1	c-San Antonio Spurs *	50	16	.758	–	66
2	y-Oklahoma City Thunder *	47	19	.712	3.0	66
3	y-Los Angeles Lakers *	41	25	.621	9.0	66
4	x-Memphis Grizzlies	41	25	.621	9.0	66
5	x-Los Angeles Clippers	40	26	.606	10.0	66
6	x-Denver Nuggets	38	28	.576	12.0	66
7	x-Dallas Mavericks	36	30	.545	14.0	66
8	x-Utah Jazz	36	30	.545	14.0	66
9	Houston Rockets	34	32	.515	16.0	66
10	Phoenix Suns	33	33	.500	17.0	66
11	Portland Trail Blazers	28	38	.424	22.0	66
12	Minnesota Timberwolves	26	40	.394	24.0	66
13	Golden State Warriors	23	43	.348	27.0	66
14	Sacramento Kings	22	44	.333	28.0	66
15	New Orleans Hornets	21	45	.318	29.0	66

=== Game log ===
2011–12 game log
Total: 28–38 (Home: 20–13; Road: 8–25)
December: 3–0 (home: 3–0; road: 0–0)

Game	Date	Team	Score	High points	High rebounds	High assists	Location Attendance	Record
1	December 26	Philadelphia	W 107–103	LaMarcus Aldridge (25)	Marcus Camby (13)	Raymond Felton (8)	Rose Garden; 20,509	1–0
2	December 27	Sacramento	W 101–79	Gerald Wallace (25)	Marcus Camby (9)	Raymond Felton (6)	Rose Garden; 20,350	2–0
3	December 29	Denver	W 111–102	Wes Matthews (25)	Marcus Camby (12)	LaMarcus Aldridge (6)	Rose Garden; 20,531	3–0

January: 9–9 (home: 6–1; road: 3–8)

Game	Date	Team	Score	High points	High rebounds	High assists	Location Attendance	Record
4	January 1	@ L. A. Clippers	L 88–93	Jamal Crawford (23)	LaMarcus Aldridge (9)	Raymond Felton (8)	Staples Center; 19,060	3–1
5	January 3	@ Oklahoma City	W 103–93	LaMarcus Aldridge (30)	Gerald Wallace (10)	Raymond Felton (7)	Chesapeake Energy Arena; 18,203	4–1
6	January 5	L. A. Lakers	W 107–96	Gerald Wallace (31)	LaMarcus Aldridge (10)	Raymond Felton (10)	Rose Garden; 20,444	5–1
7	January 6	@ Phoenix	L 77–102	LaMarcus Aldridge (14)	Marcus Camby (11)	Jamal Crawford; Nolan Smith (3)	US Airways Center; 16,235	5–2
8	January 8	Cleveland	W 98–78	LaMarcus Aldridge (28)	Marcus Camby (9)	Raymond Felton (7)	Rose Garden; 20,292	6–2
9	January 10	L. A. Clippers	W 105–97	Gerald Wallace (20)	Marcus Camby (11)	Raymond Felton (8)	Rose Garden; 20,381	7–2
10	January 11	Orlando	L 104–107	Jamal Crawford (24)	LaMarcus Aldridge (8)	Raymond Felton (8)	Rose Garden; 20,467	7–3
11	January 13	@ San Antonio	L 83–99	LaMarcus Aldridge (29)	Gerald Wallace (12)	Raymond Felton (7)	AT&T Center; 18,581	7–4
12	January 14	@ Houston	L 105–107 (OT)	Nicolas Batum (29)	LaMarcus Aldridge (10)	LaMarcus Aldridge; Raymond Felton (5)	Toyota Center; 11,676	7–5
13	January 16	@ New Orleans	W 84–77	LaMarcus Aldridge (22)	LaMarcus Aldridge (9)	Raymond Felton (12)	New Orleans Arena; 14,759	8–5
14	January 18	@ Atlanta	L 89–92	Jamal Crawford (22)	LaMarcus Aldridge (11)	Raymond Felton (8)	Philips Arena; 13,729	8–6
15	January 20	@ Toronto	W 94–84	LaMarcus Aldridge (33)	LaMarcus Aldridge (23)	LaMarcus Aldridge; Raymond Felton (5)	Air Canada Centre; 17,537	9–6
16	January 21	@ Detroit	L 91–94	LaMarcus Aldridge (25)	Nicolas Batum (9)	Raymond Felton (9)	The Palace of Auburn Hills; 14,456	9–7
17	January 23	Sacramento	W 101–89	Jamal Crawford (26)	LaMarcus Aldridge (16)	Three players (5)	Rose Garden; 20,363	10–7
18	January 24	Memphis	W 97–84	LaMarcus Aldridge (23)	Marcus Camby (22)	Jamal Crawford (4)	Rose Garden; 20,602	11–7
19	January 25	@ Golden State	L 93–101	LaMarcus Aldridge (18)	Marcus Camby (16)	Raymond Felton (7)	Oracle Arena; 17,923	11–8
20	January 27	Phoenix	W 109–71	LaMarcus Aldridge (23)	Marcus Camby (20)	Jamal Crawford (10)	Rose Garden; 20,664	12–8
21	January 30	@ Utah	L 89–93	LaMarcus Aldridge (25)	Gerald Wallace (9)	Raymond Felton (7)	EnergySolutions Arena; 19,328	12–9

February: 6–8 (home: 4–4; road: 2–4)

Game	Date	Team	Score	High points	High rebounds	High assists	Location Attendance	Record
22	February 1	Charlotte	W 112–68	Jamal Crawford (24)	Marcus Camby (7)	Raymond Felton (7)	Rose Garden; 20,608	13–9
23	February 2	@ Sacramento	L 92–95	LaMarcus Aldridge (28)	LaMarcus Aldridge (14)	Raymond Felton (10)	Power Balance Pavilion; 11,740	13–10
24	February 4	Denver	W 117–97	Nicolas Batum (33)	Marcus Camby (20)	Jamal Crawford (8)	Rose Garden; 20,583	14–10
25	February 6	Oklahoma City	L 107–111 (OT)	LaMarcus Aldridge (39)	Marcus Camby (15)	Jamal Crawford (5)	Rose Garden; 20,559	14–11
26	February 8	Houston	L 96–103	Jamal Crawford (21)	Gerald Wallace (9)	Jamal Crawford; Raymond Felton (6)	Rose Garden; 20,350	14–12
27	February 10	@ New Orleans	W 94–86	Jamal Crawford (31)	LaMarcus Aldridge; Marcus Camby (7)	Jamal Crawford (8)	New Orleans Arena; 14,421	15–12
28	February 11	@ Dallas	L 94–97 (OT)	LaMarcus Aldridge (33)	LaMarcus Aldridge (12)	Nicolas Batum (3)	American Center; 20,457	15–13
29	February 14	Washington	L 109–124	Nicolas Batum (33)	Marcus Camby (12)	Gerald Wallace (8)	Rose Garden; 20,558	15–14
30	February 15	@ Golden State	W 93–91	Gerald Wallace (24)	Marcus Camby (11)	Jamal Crawford; Raymond Felton (6)	Oracle Arena; 17,934	16–14
31	February 16	L. A. Clippers	L 71–74	Nicolas Batum; Jamal Crawford (19)	Three players (6)	Marcus Camby; Gerald Wallace (4)	Rose Garden; 20,665	16–15
32	February 18	Atlanta	W 97–77	Nicolas Batum (22)	LaMarcus Aldridge; Kurt Thomas (10)	Raymond Felton (8)	Rose Garden; 20,635	17–15
33	February 20	@ L. A. Lakers	L 92–103	LaMarcus Aldridge; Nicolas Batum (18)	Marcus Camby (13)	Nicolas Batum; Jamal Crawford (5)	Staples Center; 18,997	17–16
34	February 21	San Antonio	W 137–97	LaMarcus Aldridge (21)	Gerald Wallace (10)	Jamal Crawford (8)	Rose Garden; 20,567	18–16
All-Star Break
35	February 29	@ Denver	L 95–104	Jamal Crawford (21)	LaMarcus Aldridge (9)	Raymond Felton (7)	Pepsi Center; 15,715	18–17

March: 6–11 (home: 4–4; road: 2–7)

Game	Date	Team	Score	High points	High rebounds	High assists	Location Attendance	Record
36	March 1	Miami	L 93–107	LaMarcus Aldridge (20)	Marcus Camby; Wesley Matthews (7)	Three players (4)	Rose Garden; 20,597	18–18
37	March 3	Minnesota	L 110–122	Nicolas Batum (29)	Gerald Wallace (14)	LaMarcus Aldridge; Raymond Felton (4)	Rose Garden; 20,644	18–19
38	March 5	New Orleans	W 86–74	Nicolas Batum (19)	Marcus Camby (16)	Raymond Felton (10)	Rose Garden; 20,520	19–19
39	March 7	@ Minnesota	L 94–106	Raymond Felton (23)	Gerald Wallace (9)	Raymond Felton, Gerald Wallace (9)	Target Center; 17,118	19–20
40	March 9	@ Boston	L 86–104	LaMarcus Aldridge (22)	Marcus Camby (10)	Raymond Felton (4)	TD Garden; 18,624	19–21
41	March 10	@ Washington	W 110–99	LaMarcus Aldridge (30)	LaMarcus Aldridge (10)	Jamal Crawford; Raymond Felton (5)	Verizon Center; 18,071	20–21
42	March 13	@ Indiana	L 75–92	LaMarcus Aldridge (17)	Joel Przybilla; Gerald Wallace (6)	Raymond Felton (2)	Bankers Life Fieldhouse; 10,933	20–22
43	March 14	@ New York	L 79–121	LaMarcus Aldridge; Gerald Wallace (15)	Gerald Wallace (12)	Raymond Felton; Gerald Wallace (3)	Madison Square Garden; 19,763	20–23
44	March 16	@ Chicago	W 100–89	LaMarcus Aldridge (21)	Nicolas Batum (9)	Raymond Felton (5)	United Center; 22,022	21–23
45	March 18	@ Oklahoma City	L 95–111	Jamal Crawford (23)	Joel Przybilla (11)	Raymond Felton (7)	Chesapeake Energy Arena; 18,203	21–24
46	March 20	Milwaukee	L 87–116	LaMarcus Aldridge; Wesley Matthews (21)	LaMarcus Aldridge (12)	Raymond Felton (9)	Rose Garden; 20,387	21–25
47	March 22	Memphis	W 97–93	Nicolas Batum (24)	Wesley Matthews (9)	Raymond Felton (9)	Rose Garden; 20,636	22–25
48	March 23	@ L. A. Lakers	L 96–103	LaMarcus Aldridge (29)	LaMarcus Aldridge (9)	Raymond Felton (6)	Staples Center; 18,997	22–26
49	March 25	Golden State	W 90–87	Raymond Felton (24)	LaMarcus Aldridge (9)	Raymond Felton (7)	Rose Garden; 20,636	23–26
50	March 27	Oklahoma City	L 95–109	J. J. Hickson (21)	LaMarcus Aldridge (8)	Jonny Flynn (5)	Rose Garden; 20,626	23–27
51	March 29	New Orleans	W 99–93	LaMarcus Aldridge (25)	LaMarcus Aldridge (12)	Raymond Felton (10)	Rose Garden; 20,499	24–27
52	March 30	@ L. A. Clippers	L 97–98	J. J. Hickson (29)	J. J. Hickson (13)	Raymond Felton (8)	Staples Center; 19,060	24–28

April: 4–10 (home: 3–4; road: 1–6)

Game	Date	Team	Score	High points	High rebounds	High assists	Location Attendance	Record
53	April 1	Minnesota	W 119–106	LaMarcus Aldridge (26)	J. J. Hickson (9)	Raymond Felton (11)	Rose Garden; 20,359	25–28
54	April 2	Utah	L 97–102	Wesley Matthews (33)	Nicolas Batum (10)	Raymond Felton (8)	Rose Garden; 20,050	25–29
55	April 4	New Jersey	W 101–88	LaMarcus Aldridge (24)	Nicolas Batum (10)	Raymond Felton (9)	Rose Garden; 20,464	26–29
56	April 6	@ Dallas	W 99–97 (OT)	Raymond Felton (30)	LaMarcus Aldridge (12)	Raymond Felton (6)	American Center; 20,544	27–29
57	April 7	@ Milwaukee	L 94–116	LaMarcus Aldridge (21)	Joel Przybilla (10)	Raymond Felton (10)	Bradley Center; 14,969	27–30
58	April 9	Houston	L 89–94	LaMarcus Aldridge (20)	J. J. Hickson (10)	Raymond Felton (8)	Rose Garden; 20,487	27–31
59	April 11	Golden State	W 118–110	J. J. Hickson (23)	Joel Przybilla (14)	Raymond Felton (10)	Rose Garden; 20,502	28–31
60	April 13	Dallas	L 94–97	Nicolas Batum (20)	J. J. Hickson (10)	Jonny Flynn (5)	Rose Garden; 20,304	28–32
61	April 15	@ Sacramento	L 103–104	Wesley Matthews (31)	J. J. Hickson (13)	Jonny Flynn (5)	Power Balance Pavilion; 16,012	28–33
62	April 16	@ Phoenix	L 107–125	Jamal Crawford; J. J. Hickson (22)	J. J. Hickson (8)	Jonny Flynn (6)	US Airways Center; 15,322	28–34
63	April 18	Utah	L 91–112	Wesley Matthews (21)	J. J. Hickson (9)	Jonny Flynn (7)	Rose Garden; 20,545	28–35
64	April 21	@ Memphis	L 89–93	J. J. Hickson (23)	J. J. Hickson (13)	Nolan Smith (6)	FedExForum; 17,904	28–36
65	April 23	@ San Antonio	L 89–124	Wesley Matthews (24)	J. J. Hickson (10)	Raymond Felton (7)	AT&T Center; 18,581	28–37
66	April 26	@ Utah	L 94–96	J. J. Hickson (20)	J. J. Hickson (9)	Jonny Flynn (11)	EnergySolutions Arena; 19,554	28–38

2011–12 season schedule

== Player statistics ==
Legend
GP	Games played	GS	Games started	MPG	Minutes per game
FG%	Field-goal percentage	3P%	3-point field-goal percentage	FT%	Free-throw percentage
RPG	Rebounds per game	APG	Assists per game	SPG	Steals per game
BPG	Blocks per game	PPG	Points per game

=== Regular season ===
Portland Trail Blazers statistics
Player	GP	GS	MPG	FG%	3P%	FT%	RPG	APG	SPG	BPG	PPG
LaMarcus Aldridge	55	55	36.3	.512	.182	.814	8.0	2.4	.9	.8	21.7
Luke Babbitt	40	4	13.4	.410	.430	.850	2.4	.4	.3	.1	5.1
Nicolas Batum	59	34	30.4	.451	.391	.836	4.6	1.4	1.0	1.0	13.9
Marcus Camby ^{[a]}	40	40	22.4	.416		.474	8.9	1.9	.8	1.4	3.8
Jamal Crawford	60	6	26.9	.384	.308	.927	2.0	3.2	.9	.2	14.0
Raymond Felton	60	56	31.8	.407	.305	.806	2.5	6.5	1.3	.2	11.4
Jonny Flynn ^{[a]}	18	1	15.6	.378	.320	.720	1.7	3.8	.2	.1	5.2
J. J. Hickson	19	10	31.6	.543	.000	.645	8.3	1.2	.6	.9	15.1
Armon Johnson ^{[a]}	1	0	5.0	1.000			1.0	.0	1.0	.0	2.0
Chris Johnson ^{[a]}	20	0	4.7	.478		.833	.9	.1	.1	.4	1.6
Wesley Matthews	66	53	33.8	.412	.383	.860	3.4	1.7	1.5	.2	13.7
Joel Przybilla	27	19	16.6	.458		.611	5.1	.2	.1	.6	2.0
Craig Smith	47	0	9.9	.504	.000	.717	2.3	.4	.3	.1	3.3
Nolan Smith	44	4	12.3	.372	.289	.714	1.3	1.4	.4	.1	3.8
Hasheem Thabeet ^{[a]}	15	3	7.7	.444		.650	2.3	.0	.1	.5	1.9
Kurt Thomas	53	3	15.2	.465		.700	3.5	.9	.5	.6	3.0
Gerald Wallace ^{[a]}	42	42	35.8	.472	.265	.776	6.6	2.7	1.5	.6	13.3
Elliot Williams	24	0	6.2	.500	.296	.333	.8	.3	.3	.1	3.7

- ^{a} Statistics with the Portland Trail Blazers.

== Awards and records ==
- Jamal Crawford led the league in free throw percentage with .927.

=== All-Star ===
- LaMarcus Aldridge made his first All-Star appearance as a reserve for the West in the 2012 NBA All-Star Game.

== Injuries ==
- Before the start of the regular season, Brandon Roy announced his retirement due to a degenerative knee condition.
- LaMarcus Aldridge underwent heart surgery two weeks before the start of the regular season. Two weeks before the end of the season he had surgery to repair a torn labrum on his right hip.
- In February, Greg Oden, who was scheduled to miss the season after procedures on both of his knees, had microfracture surgery on his left knee.
- Shawne Williams had surgery in February to remove bone fragments from his left foot and missed the remainder of the season.
- In March Elliot Williams had surgery to repair his left dislocated shoulder capsule and was scheduled to miss the remainder of the season.

== Transactions ==
=== Overview ===
Players Added

Via draft

- Nolan Smith

Via free agency

- Jamal Crawford
- J. J. Hickson
- Joel Przybilla
- Kurt Thomas
- Craig Smith

Via trade

- Raymond Felton
- Jonny Flynn
- Mehmet Okur (later waived)
- Hasheem Thabeet
- Shawne Williams
Players Lost

Via trade

- Marcus Camby
- Andre Miller
- Gerald Wallace

Via free agency

- Patrick Mills

Waived

- Earl Barron
- Armon Johnson
- Chris Johnson
- Greg Oden

Retired

- Brandon Roy

=== Trades ===
June 23, 2011	To Portland Trail Blazers Raymond Felton; Draft rights to Tanguy Ngombo (from Mavericks)	To Dallas Mavericks Rudy Fernández; Draft rights to Petteri Koponen (from Trail Blazers) To Denver Nuggets Andre Miller; Draft rights to Jordan Hamilton (from Mavericks)
June 27, 2011	To Portland Trail Blazers Future second-round pick	To Minnesota Timberwolves Draft rights to Tanguy Ngombo
March 13, 2012	To Portland Trail Blazers Jonny Flynn; Hasheem Thabeet; 2012 second-round pick	To Houston Rockets Marcus Camby
March 15, 2012	To Portland Trail Blazers Mehmet Okur; Shawne Williams; 2012 first-round pick	To New Jersey Nets Gerald Wallace

=== Free agents ===
Additions
Player	Date signed	Former team
Greg Oden	December 9	Re-signed
Kurt Thomas	December 11	Chicago Bulls
Jamal Crawford	December 15	Atlanta Hawks
Craig Smith	December 15	Los Angeles Clippers
Joel Przybilla	February 27	Charlotte Bobcats
J. J. Hickson	March 21	Sacramento Kings

Subtractions
Player	Date signed	New team
Patrick Mills	March 27	San Antonio Spurs

Many players signed with teams from other leagues due to the 2011 NBA lockout. FIBA allows players under NBA contracts to sign and play for teams from other leagues if the contracts have opt-out clauses that allow the players to return to the NBA if the lockout ends. The Chinese Basketball Association, however, only allows its clubs to sign foreign free agents who could play for at least the entire season.

Played in other leagues during lockout
Player	Date signed	New team	Opt-out clause
Nicolas Batum	August 1	SLUC Nancy (France)	Yes
Jon Diebler	August 6	Panionios (Greece) (unsigned rookie)	No
Patrick Mills	August 29	Melbourne Tigers (Australia)	Yes
