= 2010–11 Portland Trail Blazers season =

NBA professional basketball team season

- Head coach: Nate McMillan
- General manager: Rich Cho
- Owner: Paul Allen
- Arena: Rose Garden

Results
- Record: 48–34 (.585)
- Place: Division: 3rd (Northwest); Conference: 6th (Western)
- Playoff finish: First round (lost to Mavericks 2–4)
- Stats at Basketball Reference

Local media
- Television: KGW; CSN Northwest
- Radio: KXTG

The 2010–11 Portland Trail Blazers season was the 41st season of the franchise in the National Basketball Association (NBA).

In the playoffs, the Trail Blazers lost to the eventual NBA champion Dallas Mavericks in six games in the First Round.

== Key dates ==
- June 24 – The 2010 NBA draft in New York City
- June 24 – Kevin Pritchard is relieved of his duties as general manager by owner Paul Allen.
- July 1 – The free agency negotiation period begins
- July 8 – First day NBA free agents can sign new contracts; Prior conditional free agent trades can be finalized
- July 16 – First round draft picks become free agents if not given a required tender
- July 19 – Rich Cho hired as general manager
- July 23 – Last day to withdraw a qualifying offer to a restricted free agent without the player's consent
- July 19 – Bernie Bickerstaff, Bob Ociepka, and Buck Williams hired as assistant coaches
- August 15 – Players waived on or after this date remain on waivers for 48 hours
- September 6 – Second round draft picks become free agents if not given a required tender
- October 1 – Last day to sign replacement player with Disabled Player exception if the player was injured from December 1 to June 30 and will be out for the season
- November 1 – Last day to exercise option years on scale contracts; Last day contracts can be extended
- December 15 – Players who signed a contract on or before September 15 can be traded

== Offseason ==
=== NBA draft ===
| Round | Pick | Player | Position | Nationality | School/Club team |
|---|---|---|---|---|---|
| 1 | 22 | Elliot Williams | G | United States | Memphis |
| 2 | 34 | Armon Johnson | G | United States | Nevada |

== Roster ==
Portland Trail Blazers roster
Players

| Pos. | No. | Player | Height | Weight | DOB | From |
|---|---|---|---|---|---|---|
| F | 12 | LaMarcus Aldridge | 6 ft 11 in (2.11 m) | 240 lb (109 kg) | | Texas |
| F | 11 | Luke Babbitt | 6 ft 9 in (2.06 m) | 225 lb (102 kg) | | Nevada |
| C | 40 | Earl Barron | 7 ft 0 in (2.13 m) | 250 lb (113 kg) | | Memphis |
| F | 88 | Nicolas Batum | 6 ft 8 in (2.03 m) | 200 lb (91 kg) | | France |
| C | 23 | Marcus Camby | 6 ft 11 in (2.11 m) | 235 lb (107 kg) | | UMass |
| G | 5 | Rudy Fernández | 6 ft 6 in (1.98 m) | 185 lb (84 kg) | | Spain |
| G | 1 | Armon Johnson | 6 ft 3 in (1.91 m) | 195 lb (88 kg) | | Nevada |
| C | 17 | Chris Johnson | 6 ft 11 in (2.11 m) | 210 lb (95 kg) | | LSU |
| G | 2 | Wesley Matthews | 6 ft 5 in (1.96 m) | 220 lb (100 kg) | | Marquette |
| G | 24 | Andre Miller | 6 ft 2 in (1.88 m) | 200 lb (91 kg) | | Utah |
| G | 8 | Patrick Mills | 6 ft 0 in (1.83 m) | 185 lb (84 kg) | | Saint Mary's |
| C | 52 | Greg Oden | 7 ft 0 in (2.13 m) | 285 lb (129 kg) | | Ohio State |
| G | 7 | Brandon Roy | 6 ft 6 in (1.98 m) | 211 lb (96 kg) | | Washington |
| F | 3 | Gerald Wallace | 6 ft 7 in (2.01 m) | 220 lb (100 kg) | | Alabama |
| G | 9 | Elliot Williams | 6 ft 5 in (1.96 m) | 180 lb (82 kg) | | Memphis |

Coaches
Head coach
- (United States) Nate McMillan (NC State)
Assistant(s)
- (United States) Bill Bayno (Sacred Heart)
- (United States) Bernie Bickerstaff (San Diego)
- (United States) Kaleb Canales (UT Arlington)
- (United States) Bob Ociepka (Quincy)
- (United States) Buck Williams (Maryland)

Legend
- (DP) Unsigned draft pick
- (FA) Free agent
- (S) Suspended
- Injured

== Salaries ==
As of October 26, 2010:

| Player | 2010–11 Salary |
|---|---|
| Brandon Roy | $13,604,000 |
| LaMarcus Aldridge | $10,744,000 |
| Gerald Wallace | $9,500,000 |
| Marcus Camby | $8,453,250 |
| Joel Przybilla | $7,405,300 |
| Andre Miller | $7,269,264 |
| Greg Oden | $6,796,524 |
| Wesley Matthews | $5,765,000 |
| Luke Babbitt | $1,645,440 |
| Sean Marks | $1,288,549 |
| Elliot Williams | $1,254,720 |
| Rudy Fernandez | $1,246,680 |
| Nicolas Batum | $1,196,760 |
| Fabricio Oberto | $992,680 |
| Patty Mills | $937,195 |
| Dante Cunningham | $762,195 |
| Jeff Pendergraph | $762,195 |
| Armon Johnson | $473,604 |
| Jarron Collins | $75,121 |
| TOTAL | $70,808,457 |

Sources:

- HoopsWorld: Blazers Salaries
- HoopsWorld: 2010–11 NBA Rookie Scale

== Pre-season ==
=== Game log ===
2010 pre-season game log
Pre-season: 3–4 (home: 3–1; road: 0–3)

| Game | Date | Team | Score | High points | High rebounds | High assists | Location Attendance | Record |
|---|---|---|---|---|---|---|---|---|
| 1 | October 5 | L.A. Clippers | W 115–86 | Wesley Matthews (20) | LaMarcus Aldridge (7) | Andre Miller (5) | Rose Garden; 18,209 | 1–0 |
| 2 | October 7 | @ Utah | L 96–100 | Wesley Matthews (21) | Dante Cunningham (10) | Wesley Matthews (5) | EnergySolutions Arena; 19,492 | 1–1 |
| 3 | October 8 | @ Denver | L 99–109 | Luke Babbitt (18) | Dante Cunningham (10) | Andre Miller (7) | Pepsi Center; 10,864 | 1–2 |
| 4 | October 11 | Utah | L 100–109 | LaMarcus Aldridge (22) | Marcus Camby (7) | Andre Miller (4) | Portland Memorial Coliseum; 10,651 | 1–3 |
| 5 | October 16 | Golden State | W 118–105 | LaMarcus Aldridge (25) | Nicolas Batum (9) | Brandon Roy, Rudy Fernández (5) | Rose Garden; 19,727 | 2–3 |
| 6 | October 18 | @ Golden State | L 78–100 | LaMarcus Aldridge (11) | Luke Babbitt (9) | Luke Babbitt (5) | Oracle Arena; 11,246 | 2–4 |
| 7 | October 21 | Denver | W 90–83 | Brandon Roy (23) | Marcus Camby (17) | Andre Miller (7) | Rose Garden; 19,710 | 3–4 |

2010–11 season schedule

== Regular season ==
=== Standings ===
| Northwest Division | W | L | PCT | GB | Home | Road | Div |
|---|---|---|---|---|---|---|---|
| y-Oklahoma City Thunder | 55 | 27 | .671 | – | 30–11 | 25–16 | 13–3 |
| x-Denver Nuggets | 50 | 32 | .610 | 5 | 33–8 | 17–24 | 9–7 |
| x-Portland Trail Blazers | 48 | 34 | .585 | 7 | 30–11 | 18–23 | 10–6 |
| Utah Jazz | 39 | 43 | .476 | 16 | 21–20 | 18–23 | 7–9 |
| Minnesota Timberwolves | 17 | 65 | .207 | 38 | 12–29 | 5–36 | 1–15 |

| # | Western Conference | | | | |
| # | Team | W | L | PCT | GB |
|---|---|---|---|---|---|
| 1 | c-San Antonio Spurs | 61 | 21 | .744 | – |
| 2 | y-Los Angeles Lakers | 57 | 25 | .695 | 4 |
| 3 | x-Dallas Mavericks | 57 | 25 | .695 | 4 |
| 4 | y-Oklahoma City Thunder | 55 | 27 | .671 | 6 |
| 5 | x-Denver Nuggets | 50 | 32 | .610 | 11 |
| 6 | x-Portland Trail Blazers | 48 | 34 | .585 | 13 |
| 7 | x-New Orleans Hornets | 46 | 36 | .561 | 15 |
| 8 | x-Memphis Grizzlies | 46 | 36 | .561 | 15 |
| 9 | Houston Rockets | 43 | 39 | .524 | 18 |
| 10 | Phoenix Suns | 40 | 42 | .488 | 21 |
| 11 | Utah Jazz | 39 | 43 | .476 | 22 |
| 12 | Golden State Warriors | 36 | 46 | .439 | 25 |
| 13 | Los Angeles Clippers | 32 | 50 | .390 | 29 |
| 14 | Sacramento Kings | 24 | 58 | .293 | 37 |
| 15 | Minnesota Timberwolves | 17 | 65 | .207 | 44 |

=== Game log ===
2010–11 game log
Total: 48–34 (home: 30–11; road: 18–23)
October: 3–0 (home: 1–0; road: 2–0)

| Game | Date | Team | Score | High points | High rebounds | High assists | Location Attendance | Record |
|---|---|---|---|---|---|---|---|---|
| 1 | October 26 | Phoenix | W 106–92 | Brandon Roy (24) | Nicolas Batum (11) | Andre Miller (9) | Rose Garden; 20,603 | 1–0 |
| 2 | October 27 | @ L.A. Clippers | W 98–88 | Brandon Roy (22) | Marcus Camby (14) | Andre Miller (7) | Staples Center; 18,382 | 2–0 |
| 3 | October 30 | @ New York | W 100–95 | Brandon Roy (29) | LaMarcus Aldridge (10) | Andre Miller (10) | Madison Square Garden; 19,763 | 3–0 |

November: 5–9 (home: 3–3; road: 2–6)

| Game | Date | Team | Score | High points | High rebounds | High assists | Location Attendance | Record |
|---|---|---|---|---|---|---|---|---|
| 4 | November 1 | @ Chicago | L 98–110 | LaMarcus Aldridge (33) | Marcus Camby (11) | Andre Miller (6) | United Center; 21,057 | 3–1 |
| 5 | November 2 | @ Milwaukee | W 90–76 | Wesley Matthews (18) | Marcus Camby (13) | Andre Miller, Armon Johnson (5) | Bradley Center; 13,087 | 4–1 |
| 6 | November 4 | Oklahoma City | L 106–107 (OT) | LaMarcus Aldridge (22) | Marcus Camby (12) | Andre Miller (11) | Rose Garden; 20,611 | 4–2 |
| 7 | November 6 | Toronto | W 97–84 | Brandon Roy (26) | Marcus Camby (16) | Andre Miller (13) | Rose Garden; 20,363 | 5–2 |
| 8 | November 7 | @ L.A. Lakers | L 96–121 | Andre Miller (20) | Marcus Camby (7) | Andre Miller (5) | Staples Center; 18,997 | 5–3 |
| 9 | November 9 | Detroit | W 100–78 | LaMarcus Aldridge (19) | LaMarcus Aldridge (17) | Marcus Camby (6) | Rose Garden; 20,556 | 6–3 |
| 10 | November 12 | @ Oklahoma City | L 108–110 | Brandon Roy (24) | Nicolas Batum, Marcus Camby (6) | Andre Miller (10) | Oklahoma City Arena; 18,203 | 6–4 |
| 11 | November 13 | @ New Orleans | L 87–107 | Nicolas Batum (16) | Marcus Camby (12) | LaMarcus Aldridge (5) | New Orleans Arena; 14,706 | 6–5 |
| 12 | November 16 | @ Memphis | W 100–99 | Wesley Matthews (30) | Marcus Camby (17) | Andre Miller (9) | FedExForum; 10,827 | 7–5 |
| 13 | November 18 | Denver | W 86–83 | LaMarcus Aldridge (24) | Marcus Camby (14) | Andre Miller (6) | Rose Garden; 20,532 | 8–5 |
| 14 | November 20 | Utah | L 94–103 | LaMarcus Aldridge (24) | Marcus Camby (14) | Andre Miller (9) | Rose Garden; 20,533 | 8–6 |
| 15 | November 26 | New Orleans | L 78–97 | Brandon Roy (27) | LaMarcus Aldridge (9) | Andre Miller (6) | Rose Garden; 20,452 | 8–7 |
| 16 | November 28 | @ New Jersey | L 96–98 | Wesley Matthews (25) | Marcus Camby (10) | Andre Miller (5) | Prudential Center; 11,448 | 8–8 |
| 17 | November 30 | @ Philadelphia | L 79–88 | Wesley Matthews (26) | LaMarcus Aldridge (12) | Andre Miller (9) | Wells Fargo Center; 13,556 | 8–9 |

December: 9–7 (home: 7–0; road: 2–7)

| Game | Date | Team | Score | High points | High rebounds | High assists | Location Attendance | Record |
|---|---|---|---|---|---|---|---|---|
| 18 | December 1 | @ Boston | L 95–99 | Wesley Matthews (23) | Marcus Camby (9) | Andre Miller (6) | TD Garden; 18,624 | 8–10 |
| 19 | December 3 | @ Washington | L 79–83 | Brandon Roy (18) | LaMarcus Aldridge (15) | Patrick Mills (6) | Verizon Center; 13,408 | 8–11 |
| 20 | December 5 | L.A. Clippers | W 100–91 | Wesley Matthews (26) | Marcus Camby (19) | Andre Miller (6) | Rose Garden; 20,139 | 9–11 |
| 21 | December 7 | Phoenix | W 106–99 | Wesley Matthews (24) | LaMarcus Aldridge (6) | Patrick Mills (7) | Rose Garden; 20,151 | 10–11 |
| 22 | December 9 | Orlando | W 97–83 | Andre Miller (22) | Marcus Camby (13) | Andre Miller (8) | Rose Garden; 20,219 | 11–11 |
| 23 | December 10 | @ Phoenix | W 101–94 | Brandon Roy (26) | Marcus Camby (18) | Andre Miller (9) | US Airways Center; 17,284 | 12–11 |
| 24 | December 12 | @ San Antonio | L 78–95 | Wesley Matthews (17) | Marcus Camby (13) | Andre Miller (7) | AT&T Center; 16,743 | 12–12 |
| 25 | December 13 | @ Memphis | L 73–86 | Wesley Matthews (18) | Marcus Camby (14) | Andre Miller (9) | FedExForum; 10,467 | 12–13 |
| 26 | December 15 | @ Dallas | L 98–103 | LaMarcus Aldridge (35) | LaMarcus Aldridge (10) | Andre Miller (8) | American Airlines Center; 19,531 | 12–14 |
| 27 | December 17 | Minnesota | W 107–102 | LaMarcus Aldridge (36) | LaMarcus Aldridge (10) | Rudy Fernández (6) | Rose Garden; 20,310 | 13–14 |
| 28 | December 18 | Golden State | W 96–95 | LaMarcus Aldridge, Andre Miller (17) | LaMarcus Aldridge (12) | Andre Miller (8) | Rose Garden; 20,398 | 14–14 |
| 29 | December 20 | Milwaukee | W 106–80 | LaMarcus Aldridge (29) | LaMarcus Aldridge (19) | Andre Miller (9) | Rose Garden; 20,406 | 15–14 |
| 30 | December 25 | @ Golden State | L 102–109 | Wesley Matthews (25) | Marcus Camby (13) | Andre Miller (15) | Oracle Arena; 19,596 | 15–15 |
| 31 | December 27 | @ Utah | W 96–91 | LaMarcus Aldridge (26) | Marcus Camby (12) | Andre Miller (6) | EnergySolutions Arena; 19,911 | 16–15 |
| 32 | December 28 | @ Denver | L 77–85 | LaMarcus Aldridge (18) | LaMarcus Aldridge (13) | Andre Miller (5) | Pepsi Center; 17,388 | 16–16 |
| 33 | December 30 | Utah | W 100–89 | Wesley Matthews (30) | Marcus Camby (20) | Andre Miller (10) | Rose Garden; 20,652 | 17–16 |

January: 8–6 (home: 5–4; road: 3–2)

| Game | Date | Team | Score | High points | High rebounds | High assists | Location Attendance | Record |
|---|---|---|---|---|---|---|---|---|
| 34 | January 2 | Houston | W 100–85 | LaMarcus Aldridge (25) | Marcus Camby (13) | Marcus Camby (8) | Rose Garden; 20,416 | 18–16 |
| 35 | January 4 | @ Dallas | L 81–84 | LaMarcus Aldridge (28) | Marcus Camby (20) | Marcus Camby, Patrick Mills (4) | American Airlines Center; 19,514 | 18–17 |
| 36 | January 5 | @ Houston | W 103–100 | LaMarcus Aldridge (27) | LaMarcus Aldridge (13) | Rudy Fernández (5) | Toyota Center; 14,125 | 19–17 |
| 37 | January 7 | @ Minnesota | W 108–98 | Wesley Matthews (36) | LaMarcus Aldridge (10) | Andre Miller (10) | Target Center; 12,213 | 20–17 |
| 38 | January 9 | Miami | L 100–107 (OT) | LaMarcus Aldridge (31) | LaMarcus Aldridge, Marcus Camby (14) | LaMarcus Aldridge, Andre Miller (7) | Rose Garden; 20,636 | 20–18 |
| 39 | January 11 | New York | L 86–100 | LaMarcus Aldridge (19) | Marcus Camby (16) | Marcus Camby, Andre Miller (3) | Rose Garden; 20,604 | 20–19 |
| 40 | January 14 | @ Phoenix | L 111–115 | Wesley Matthews (26) | Marcus Camby (15) | Andre Miller (8) | US Airways Center; 17,412 | 20–20 |
| 41 | January 15 | New Jersey | W 96–89 | LaMarcus Aldridge (27) | Marcus Camby (10) | Andre Miller (8) | Rose Garden; 20,441 | 21–20 |
| 42 | January 17 | Minnesota | W 113–102 | LaMarcus Aldridge (37) | LaMarcus Aldridge (12) | Andre Miller (10) | Rose Garden; 20,239 | 22–20 |
| 43 | January 19 | @ Sacramento | W 94–90 (OT) | Nicolas Batum (24) | Joel Przybilla (11) | Andre Miller (6) | ARCO Arena; 12,722 | 23–20 |
| 44 | January 20 | L.A. Clippers | W 108–93 | LaMarcus Aldridge, Wesley Matthews (28) | LaMarcus Aldridge, Andre Miller (8) | Andre Miller (7) | Rose Garden; 20,630 | 24–20 |
| 45 | January 22 | Indiana | W 97–92 | LaMarcus Aldridge (25) | LaMarcus Aldridge (12) | Wesley Matthews (9) | Rose Garden; 20,563 | 25–20 |
| 46 | January 24 | Sacramento | L 81–96 | Wesley Matthews (21) | Nicolas Batum (9) | LaMarcus Aldridge, Andre Miller (5) | Rose Garden; 20,488 | 25–21 |
| 47 | January 27 | Boston | L 78–88 | LaMarcus Aldridge (17) | LaMarcus Aldridge (16) | Andre Miller (7) | Rose Garden; 20,706 | 25–22 |

February: 8–4 (home: 4–2; road: 4–2)

| Game | Date | Team | Score | High points | High rebounds | High assists | Location Attendance | Record |
|---|---|---|---|---|---|---|---|---|
| 48 | February 1 | San Antonio | W 99–86 | LaMarcus Aldridge (40) | LaMarcus Aldridge (11) | Andre Miller (9) | Rose Garden; 20,364 | 26–22 |
| 49 | February 2 | @ Denver | L 90–109 | Wesley Matthews (19) | LaMarcus Aldridge (9) | Andre Miller (10) | Pepsi Center; 15,258 | 26–23 |
| 50 | February 4 | @ Indiana | L 87–100 | Rudy Fernández (19) | LaMarcus Aldridge (10) | Rudy Fernández (5) | Conseco Fieldhouse; 11,778 | 26–24 |
| 51 | February 5 | @ Cleveland | W 111–105 | Wesley Matthews (31) | LaMarcus Aldridge (10) | Andre Miller (13) | Quicken Loans Arena; 19,975 | 27–24 |
| 52 | February 7 | Chicago | W 109–103 | LaMarcus Aldridge (42) | LaMarcus Aldridge (8) | Andre Miller (11) | Rose Garden; 20,534 | 28–24 |
| 53 | February 11 | @ Toronto | W 102–96 | LaMarcus Aldridge (37) | LaMarcus Aldridge (10) | Andre Miller (8) | Air Canada Centre; 15,625 | 29–24 |
| 54 | February 13 | @ Detroit | W 105–100 | LaMarcus Aldridge (36) | Wesley Matthews (7) | Andre Miller (12) | The Palace of Auburn Hills; 15,257 | 30–24 |
| 55 | February 14 | @ Minnesota | W 95–81 | Wesley Matthews (23) | Dante Cunningham (13) | Andre Miller (7) | Target Center; 11,227 | 31–24 |
| 56 | February 16 | New Orleans | W 103–96 | LaMarcus Aldridge (34) | Wesley Matthews (8) | Andre Miller (7) | Rose Garden; 20,650 | 32–24 |
All-Star Break
| 57 | February 23 | L.A. Lakers | L 101–106 (OT) | LaMarcus Aldridge (29) | LaMarcus Aldridge (14) | Andre Miller (8) | Rose Garden; 20,643 | 32–25 |
| 58 | February 25 | Denver | W 107–106 (OT) | LaMarcus Aldridge (24) | LaMarcus Aldridge (14) | Andre Miller (9) | Rose Garden; 20,659 | 33–25 |
| 59 | February 27 | Atlanta | L 83–90 | Andre Miller (20) | LaMarcus Aldridge (8) | Andre Miller (4) | Rose Garden; 20,642 | 33–26 |

March: 10–6 (home: 6–1; road: 4–5)

| Game | Date | Team | Score | High points | High rebounds | High assists | Location Attendance | Record |
|---|---|---|---|---|---|---|---|---|
| 60 | March 1 | Houston | L 87–103 | Nicolas Batum (22) | Gerald Wallace (10) | Andre Miller (6) | Rose Garden; 20,272 | 33–27 |
| 61 | March 2 | @ Sacramento | W 107–102 | Wesley Matthews (21) | Marcus Camby (13) | Andre Miller (6) | Power Balance Pavilion; 12,286 | 34–27 |
| 62 | March 5 | Charlotte | W 93–69 | LaMarcus Aldridge (26) | Marcus Camby (10) | Andre Miller (6) | Rose Garden; 20,588 | 35–27 |
| 63 | March 7 | @ Orlando | W 89–85 | LaMarcus Aldridge (24) | Marcus Camby, Gerald Wallace (10) | Andre Miller (7) | Amway Center; 19,001 | 36–27 |
| 64 | March 8 | @ Miami | W 105–96 | LaMarcus Aldridge (26) | Gerald Wallace (9) | Andre Miller, Wesley Matthews (5) | American Airlines Arena; 19,835 | 37–27 |
| 65 | March 11 | @ Charlotte | L 92–97 | Wesley Matthews (20) | Marcus Camby (11) | Andre Miller (9) | Time Warner Cable Arena; 18,176 | 37–28 |
| 66 | March 12 | @ Atlanta | L 82–91 | LaMarcus Aldridge (22) | Gerald Wallace (12) | LaMarcus Aldridge (7) | Philips Arena; 15,522 | 37–29 |
| 67 | March 15 | Dallas | W 104–101 | LaMarcus Aldridge (30) | LaMarcus Aldridge, Marcus Camby (8) | Nicolas Batum (5) | Rose Garden; 20,631 | 38–29 |
| 68 | March 17 | Cleveland | W 111–70 | LaMarcus Aldridge (20) | LaMarcus Aldridge (11) | Andre Miller, Gerald Wallace (6) | Rose Garden; 20,235 | 39–29 |
| 69 | March 19 | Philadelphia | W 110–101 | Gerald Wallace (25) | LaMarcus Aldridge (7) | Gerald Wallace (8) | Rose Garden; 20,637 | 40–29 |
| 70 | March 20 | @ L.A. Lakers | L 80–84 | Nicolas Batum (25) | Marcus Camby (10) | Andre Miller (5) | Staples Center; 18,997 | 40–30 |
| 71 | March 22 | Washington | W 111–76 | Gerald Wallace (28) | Nicolas Batum (12) | Andre Miller (11) | Rose Garden; 20,624 | 41–30 |
| 72 | March 25 | San Antonio | W 98–96 | Nicolas Batum, Andre Miller (21) | Gerald Wallace (10) | Andre Miller (8) | Rose Garden; 20,644 | 42–30 |
| 73 | March 27 | @ Oklahoma City | L 90–99 | Gerald Wallace (40) | Marcus Camby (13) | Andre Miller (5) | Oklahoma City Arena; 18,203 | 42–31 |
| 74 | March 28 | @ San Antonio | W 100–92 | Andre Miller (26) | Nicolas Batum (13) | Brandon Roy (4) | AT&T Center; 18,583 | 43–31 |
| 75 | March 30 | @ New Orleans | L 91–95 | LaMarcus Aldridge (24) | LaMarcus Aldridge (15) | Andre Miller (5) | New Orleans Arena; 12,575 | 43–32 |

April: 5–2 (home: 4–1; road: 1–1)

| Game | Date | Team | Score | High points | High rebounds | High assists | Location Attendance | Record |
|---|---|---|---|---|---|---|---|---|
| 76 | April 1 | Oklahoma City | W 98–91 | LaMarcus Aldridge (32) | LaMarcus Aldridge (8) | Andre Miller (7) | Rose Garden; 20,709 | 44–32 |
| 77 | April 3 | Dallas | W 104–96 | Gerald Wallace (19) | LaMarcus Aldridge, Gerald Wallace (8) | Nicolas Batum, Brandon Roy (4) | Rose Garden; 20,534 | 45–32 |
| 78 | April 5 | Golden State | L 87–108 | LaMarcus Aldridge, Wesley Matthews (17) | LaMarcus Aldridge (12) | LaMarcus Aldridge (4) | Rose Garden; 20,551 | 45–33 |
| 79 | April 7 | @ Utah | W 98–87 | Gerald Wallace (29) | LaMarcus Aldridge (11) | Andre Miller (12) | EnergySolutions Arena; 18,831 | 46–33 |
| 80 | April 8 | L.A. Lakers | W 93–86 | LaMarcus Aldridge (24) | Gerald Wallace (13) | Andre Miller (13) | Rose Garden; 20,697 | 47–33 |
| 81 | April 12 | Memphis | W 102–89 | LaMarcus Aldridge (22) | LaMarcus Aldridge, Marcus Camby (11) | Andre Miller (8) | Rose Garden; 20,662 | 48–33 |
| 82 | April 13 | @ Golden State | L 86–110 | Patrick Mills (23) | Earl Barron, Chris Johnson (13) | Rudy Fernández (5) | Oracle Arena; 19,596 | 48–34 |

2010–11 season schedule

== Playoffs ==
=== Game log ===
2011 playoff game log
First Round: 2–4 (home: 2–1; road: 0–3)

| Game | Date | Team | Score | High points | High rebounds | High assists | Location Attendance | Series |
|---|---|---|---|---|---|---|---|---|
| 1 | April 16 | @ Dallas | L 81–89 | LaMarcus Aldridge (27) | Marcus Camby (18) | Andre Miller (6) | American Airlines Center; 20,541 | 0–1 |
| 2 | April 19 | @ Dallas | L 89–101 | LaMarcus Aldridge (24) | LaMarcus Aldridge (10) | Andre Miller (8) | American Airlines Center; 20,620 | 0–2 |
| 3 | April 21 | Dallas | W 97–92 | Wesley Matthews (25) | Gerald Wallace (11) | Andre Miller (7) | Rose Garden; 20,217 | 1–2 |
| 4 | April 23 | Dallas | W 84–82 | Brandon Roy (24) | Gerald Wallace (11) | Brandon Roy (5) | Rose Garden; 20,357 | 2–2 |
| 5 | April 25 | @ Dallas | L 82–93 | Andre Miller (18) | LaMarcus Aldridge, Gerald Wallace (9) | Andre Miller (7) | American Airlines Center; 20,837 | 2–3 |
| 6 | April 28 | Dallas | L 96–103 | Gerald Wallace (32) | Gerald Wallace (12) | Andre Miller (4) | Rose Garden; 20,494 | 2–4 |

2011 playoff schedule

== Player statistics ==
Legend
| GP | Games played | GS | Games started | MPG | Minutes per game |
| FG% | Field-goal percentage | 3P% | 3-point field-goal percentage | FT% | Free-throw percentage |
| RPG | Rebounds per game | APG | Assists per game | SPG | Steals per game |
| BPG | Blocks per game | PPG | Points per game |

=== Season ===
Portland Trail Blazers statistics
| Player | GP | GS | MPG | FG% | 3P% | FT% | RPG | APG | SPG | BPG | PPG |
|---|---|---|---|---|---|---|---|---|---|---|---|
| LaMarcus Aldridge | 81 | 81 | 39.6 | .500 | .174 | .791 | 8.8 | 2.1 | 1.01 | 1.16 | 21.8 |
| Luke Babbitt | 23 | 0 | 4.5 | .289 | .091 | .286 | 0.8 | 0.1 | .09 | .09 | 1.1 |
| Earl Barron* | 1 | 0 | 1.0 | 1.000 | .0 | .0 | 1.0 | 0.0 | .0 | .0 | 2.0 |
| Nicolas Batum | 80 | 67 | 31.5 | .455 | .345 | .841 | 4.5 | 1.5 | .85 | .61 | 12.4 |
| Marcus Camby | 59 | 51 | 26.1 | .398 | .000 | .614 | 10.3 | 2.1 | .68 | 1.56 | 4.7 |
| Jarron Collins* | 5 | 0 | 4.8 | .167 | .0 | .0 | 1.4 | 0.2 | .0 | .0 | 0.4 |
| Dante Cunningham* | 56 | 9 | 19.8 | .433 | .000 | .711 | 3.4 | 0.5 | .70 | .57 | 5.1 |
| Rudy Fernández | 77 | 2 | 23.2 | .372 | .323 | .863 | 2.2 | 2.4 | 1.12 | .18 | 8.6 |
| Armon Johnson | 37 | 0 | 6.6 | .461 | .455 | .579 | 0.9 | 1.1 | .08 | .03 | 2.6 |
| Chris Johnson* | 9 | 0 | 7.3 | .600 | .0 | .700 | 1.6 | 0.1 | .22 | .56 | 2.1 |
| Sean Marks | 29 | 0 | 7.2 | .432 | 1.000 | .625 | 1.4 | 0.1 | .14 | .10 | 1.6 |
| Wesley Matthews | 81 | 68 | 33.8 | .448 | .404 | .842 | 3.2 | 2.0 | 1.26 | .11 | 15.8 |
| Andre Miller | 80 | 80 | 33.0 | .459 | .111 | .853 | 3.8 | 7.1 | 1.43 | .15 | 12.8 |
| Patrick Mills | 64 | 0 | 12.2 | .412 | .353 | .766 | 0.8 | 1.7 | .40 | 1.0 | 5.5 |
| Fabricio Oberto | 5 | 0 | 9.0 | .600 | .0 | .500 | 1.4 | 0.0 | .0 | .0 | 1.4 |
| Joel Przybilla* | 31 | 9 | 14.4 | .618 | .0 | .565 | 3.9 | 0.4 | .16 | .45 | 1.8 |
| Brandon Roy | 47 | 23 | 27.9 | .400 | .333 | .848 | 2.6 | 2.7 | .79 | .26 | 12.2 |
| Gerald Wallace* | 23 | 15 | 35.7 | .498 | .338 | .767 | 7.6 | 2.5 | 2.00 | .65 | 15.8 |

As of April 12.
* – Stats with the Blazers.

=== Playoffs ===
Portland Trail Blazers statistics
| Player | GP | GS | MPG | FG% | 3P% | FT% | RPG | APG | SPG | BPG | PPG |
|---|---|---|---|---|---|---|---|---|---|---|---|
| LaMarcus Aldridge | 6 | 6 | 43.0 | .461 | | .792 | 7.5 | 1.3 | 1.3 | 1.7 | 20.8 |
| Gerald Wallace | 6 | 6 | 37.7 | .448 | .176 | .875 | 9.2 | 2.8 | 1.3 | .5 | 15.2 |
| Wesley Matthews | 6 | 6 | 33.7 | .474 | .381 | .842 | 1.2 | 1.0 | .7 | .2 | 13.0 |
| Andre Miller | 6 | 6 | 32.3 | .493 | .400 | .792 | 3.2 | 5.5 | .3 | .0 | 14.8 |
| Marcus Camby | 6 | 6 | 27.8 | .455 | 1.000 | .000 | 9.7 | 1.3 | .7 | 1.5 | 3.5 |
| Nicolas Batum | 6 | 0 | 25.2 | .413 | .269 | .750 | 1.7 | 1.3 | .8 | .8 | 8.0 |
| Brandon Roy | 6 | 0 | 23.0 | .500 | .286 | .615 | 2.2 | 2.8 | .2 | .0 | 9.3 |
| Rudy Fernández | 6 | 0 | 13.5 | .222 | .300 | .667 | 2.0 | .8 | .3 | .2 | 2.8 |
| Chris Johnson | 4 | 0 | 4.8 | 1.000 | | 1.000 | 1.3 | .0 | .0 | .5 | 1.0 |
| Patty Mills | 2 | 0 | 2.5 | .000 | .000 | | .5 | .0 | .0 | .0 | .0 |
| Armon Johnson | 2 | 0 | 0.0 | | | | .5 | .0 | .0 | .0 | .0 |
| Earl Barron | 1 | 0 | 0.0 | | | | .0 | .0 | .0 | .0 | .0 |

== Awards, records and milestones ==
=== Awards ===
==== Weekly and monthly ====
- Western Conference Player of the Week
  - January 17–23, 2011 – LaMarcus Aldridge
  - February 7–13, 2011 – LaMarcus Aldridge
- Western Conference Player of the Month
  - February 2011 – LaMarcus Aldridge

==== All-Star ====
- NBA All-Star Weekend Rookie Challenge – Wesley Matthews

== Injuries and surgeries ==
- December 5, 2009: Greg Oden – broken left patella (suffered in 2009–10 season)
- December 22, 2009: Joel Przybilla – dislocated right patella and ruptured patellar tendon (suffered in 2009–10 season)
- November 4, 2010: Elliot Williams – dislocated right patella; out for season

== Transactions ==
=== Trades ===
June 21, 2010
To Golden State Warriors

- No. 44 pick ( (United States) Jerome Jordan)
  cash considerations
To Portland Trail Blazers

- No. 34 pick ( (United States) Armon Johnson)
June 24, 2010
To Portland Trail Blazers

- No. 16 pick ( (United States) Luke Babbitt)
- (United States) Ryan Gomes
To Minnesota Timberwolves

- (United States) Martell Webster
February 24, 2011
To Portland Trail Blazers

- (United States) Gerald Wallace
To Charlotte Bobcats

- (United States) Dante Cunningham
- (United States) Joel Przybilla
- (New Zealand) Sean Marks
- 2011 first-round pick
- 2013 first-round pick
- Cash considerations

=== Free agents ===
==== Additions ====
| Player | Signed | Former team |
|---|---|---|
| Wesley Matthews | five-year contract for $34 million | Utah Jazz |
| Sean Marks | Undisclosed | New Orleans Hornets |
| Chris Johnson | Signed for rest of season | Boston Celtics |
| Jarron Collins | 10-day contract | Los Angeles Clippers |
| Earl Barron | Signed for rest of season | Milwaukee Bucks |

==== Subtractions ====
| Player | Reason Left | New Team |
|---|---|---|
| Ryan Gomes | Waived | Los Angeles Clippers |
| Fabricio Oberto | Retired | n/a |
| Jarron Collins | 10-day contract expired | |
