= 2010–11 Minnesota Timberwolves season =

NBA professional basketball team season

- Head coach: Kurt Rambis
- President: David Kahn
- General manager: David Kahn
- Owner: Glen Taylor
- Arena: Target Center

Results
- Record: 17–65 (.207)
- Place: Division: 5th (Northwest); Conference: 15th (Western)
- Playoff finish: Did not qualify
- Stats at Basketball Reference

Local media
- Television: Fox Sports North; WFTC
- Radio: KFAN

The 2010–11 Minnesota Timberwolves season was the 22nd season of the franchise in the National Basketball Association (NBA).

== Key dates ==
- June 24, 2010 – The 2010 NBA draft was held in New York City.
- July 1, 2010 – The free agency period began.
- October 26, 2010 – Regular season began.
- December 25, 2010 – Christmas Day
- February 20, 2011 – 2011 NBA All-Star Game
- April 13, 2011 – Regular season ended
- April 16, 2011 – 2011 NBA Playoffs
- May 31, 2011 – 2011 NBA Finals

== Summary ==
=== NBA draft 2010 ===
Round	Pick	Player	Position	Nationality	College
1	4	Wesley Johnson	Small forward	United States	Syracuse
1	16	Luke Babbitt (traded to Portland Trail Blazers)	Small forward	United States	Nevada
1	23	Trevor Booker (traded to Washington Wizards)	Forward	United States	Clemson
1	30	Lazar Hayward(acquired from Washington Wizards)	Small forward	United States	Marquette
2	35	Nemanja Bjelica (acquired from Washington Wizards)	Small forward	Serbia	Red Star Belgrade
2	45	Paulão Prestes	Center	Brazil	Brazil
2	56	Hamady N'Diaye(traded to Washington Wizards)	Center	Senegal	Rutgers University

== Roster ==
2010–11 Minnesota Timberwolves roster
Players

Pos.	No.	Player	Height	Weight	DOB	From
SF	8	Michael Beasley	6 ft 10 in (2.08 m)	235 lb (107 kg)	1989-01-09	Kansas State
SG	19	Wayne Ellington	6 ft 4 in (1.93 m)	200 lb (91 kg)	1987-11-29	North Carolina
PG	10	Jonny Flynn	6 ft 0 in (1.83 m)	185 lb (84 kg)	1989-02-06	Syracuse
SF	32	Lazar Hayward	6 ft 6 in (1.98 m)	225 lb (102 kg)	1986-11-26	Marquette
SG	4	Wesley Johnson	6 ft 7 in (2.01 m)	210 lb (95 kg)	1987-07-11	Syracuse
PF	42	Kevin Love	6 ft 8 in (2.03 m)	260 lb (118 kg)	1988-09-07	UCLA
C	31	Darko Milicic	7 ft 0 in (2.13 m)	275 lb (125 kg)	1985-06-20	Serbia
C	14	Nikola Peković	6 ft 11 in (2.11 m)	290 lb (132 kg)	1986-01-03	Montenegro
C	15	Anthony Randolph	6 ft 11 in (2.11 m)	225 lb (102 kg)	1989-07-15	LSU
PG	13	Luke Ridnour	6 ft 2 in (1.88 m)	175 lb (79 kg)	1981-02-13	Oregon
PG	3	Sebastian Telfair	6 ft 0 in (1.83 m)	175 lb (79 kg)	1985-06-09	Abraham Lincoln High School (Brooklyn)
SF	44	Anthony Tolliver	6 ft 9 in (2.06 m)	243 lb (110 kg)	1985-06-01	Creighton
SF	5	Martell Webster	6 ft 7 in (2.01 m)	235 lb (107 kg)	1986-12-04	Seattle Preparatory School

Coaches
Head coach
- Kurt Rambis
Assistant(s)
- J. B. Bickerstaff
- Bill Laimbeer
- Reggie Theus
- Dave Wohl
- Gregg Farnam (trainer)

Legend
- (DP) Unsigned draft pick
- (FA) Free agent
- (S) Suspended
- (DL) On assignment to D-League affiliate
- Injured

Roster
Updated: March 1, 2011

== Pre-season ==
=== Game log ===
2010 pre-season game log
Pre-season: 6–2 (home: 5–1; road: 1–1)

Game	Date	Team	Score	High points	High rebounds	High assists	Location Attendance	Record
1	October 4	L.A. Lakers	W 111–92	Martell Webster (24)	Kevin Love (8)	Luke Ridnour (7)	O2 Arena; 18,689	1–0
2	October 6	New York	W 106–100	Kevin Love, Martell Webster (17)	Kevin Love (14)	Sebastian Telfair (4)	Palais Omnisports de Paris-Bercy; 15,532	2–0
3	October 12	Denver	W 122–108	Michael Beasley (21)	Kevin Love (15)	Sebastian Telfair (8)	Target Center; 8,718	3–0
4	October 13	@ Indiana	L 86–98	Luke Ridnour (11)	Kevin Love (9)	Sebastian Telfair (3)	Conseco Fieldhouse; 9,177	3–1
5	October 15	Detroit	W 99–88	Kevin Love (21)	Kevin Love (10)	Sebastian Telfair (7)	Carrier Dome; 11,747	4–1
6	October 17	Milwaukee	W 114–109	Kevin Love (32)	Kevin Love (13)	Luke Ridnour (7)	Sioux Falls Arena; 5,102	5–1
7	October 19	Indiana	L 124–128 (OT)	Kevin Love (28)	Kevin Love (11)	Sebastian Telfair (6)	Target Center; 10,918	5–2
8	October 22	@ Milwaukee	W 119–118	Luke Ridnour (17)	Darko Miličić (10)	Luke Ridnour (7)	Bradley Center; 11,624	6–2

2010–11 season schedule

== Regular season ==
=== Standings ===
Northwest Division	W	L	PCT	GB	Home	Road	Div
y-Oklahoma City Thunder	55	27	.671	–	30–11	25–16	13–3
x-Denver Nuggets	50	32	.610	5	33–8	17–24	9–7
x-Portland Trail Blazers	48	34	.585	7	30–11	18–23	10–6
Utah Jazz	39	43	.476	16	21–20	18–23	7–9
Minnesota Timberwolves	17	65	.207	38	12–29	5–36	1–15

#	Western Conference				
#	Team	W	L	PCT	GB
1	c-San Antonio Spurs	61	21	.744	–
2	y-Los Angeles Lakers	57	25	.695	4
3	x-Dallas Mavericks	57	25	.695	4
4	y-Oklahoma City Thunder	55	27	.671	6
5	x-Denver Nuggets	50	32	.610	11
6	x-Portland Trail Blazers	48	34	.585	13
7	x-New Orleans Hornets	46	36	.561	15
8	x-Memphis Grizzlies	46	36	.561	15
9	Houston Rockets	43	39	.524	18
10	Phoenix Suns	40	42	.488	21
11	Utah Jazz	39	43	.476	22
12	Golden State Warriors	36	46	.439	25
13	Los Angeles Clippers	32	50	.390	29
14	Sacramento Kings	24	58	.293	37
15	Minnesota Timberwolves	17	65	.207	44

=== Game log ===
2010–11 game log
Total: 17–65 (Home: 12–29; Road: 5–36)
October: 1–2 (home: 1–1; road: 0–1)

Game	Date	Team	Score	High points	High rebounds	High assists	Location Attendance	Record
1	October 27	Sacramento	L 116–117	Luke Ridnour (20)	Kevin Love (10)	Luke Ridnour, Sebastian Telfair (6)	Target Center; 17,067	0–1
2	October 29	Milwaukee	W 96–85	Michael Beasley (21)	Kevin Love (16)	Luke Ridnour (7)	Target Center; 17,197	1–1
3	October 30	@ Memphis	L 89–109	Wayne Ellington (15)	Kevin Love (13)	Luke Ridnour (3)	FedExForum; 12,753	1–2

November: 3–11 (home: 2–4; road: 1–7)

Game	Date	Team	Score	High points	High rebounds	High assists	Location Attendance	Record
4	November 2	@ Miami	L 97–129	Kevin Love (20)	Nikola Peković (8)	Wesley Johnson (5)	American Airlines Arena; 19,600	1–3
5	November 3	@ Orlando	L 86–128	Kevin Love (22)	Kevin Love (9)	Sebastian Telfair (5)	Amway Center; 18,846	1–4
6	November 5	Atlanta	L 103–113	Kevin Love, Corey Brewer, Wesley Johnson (18)	Kevin Love (12)	Sebastian Telfair (7)	Target Center; 17.222	1–5
7	November 7	@ Houston	L 94–120	Kevin Love (16)	Kevin Love (16)	Corey Brewer (3)	Toyota Center; 15,058	1–6
8	November 9	@ L.A. Lakers	L 94–99	Kevin Love (23)	Kevin Love (24)	Sebastian Telfair (9)	Staples Center; 18,997	1–7
9	November 10	@ Sacramento	W 98–89	Michael Beasley (42)	Michael Beasley, Kevin Love (9)	Darko Miličić (4)	ARCO Arena; 12,433	2–7
10	November 12	New York	W 112–103	Michael Beasley (35)	Kevin Love (31)	Sebastian Telfair (8)	Target Center; 15,232	3–7
11	November 14	@ Atlanta	L 105–111	Michael Beasley (25)	Kevin Love (17)	Sebastian Telfair (8)	Philips Arena; 12,027	3–8
12	November 15	@ Charlotte	L 110–113	Michael Beasley (28)	Darko Miličić (12)	Sebastian Telfair (6)	Time Warner Cable Arena; 11,211	3–9
13	November 17	L.A. Clippers	W 113–111	Michael Beasley (33)	Kevin Love (14)	Luke Ridnour (8)	Target Center; 12,909	4–9
14	November 19	L.A. Lakers	L 95–112	Michael Beasley (25)	Darko Miličić (16)	Darko Miličić (5)	Target Center; 19,356	4–10
15	November 22	@ Oklahoma City	L 107–117	Kevin Love (24)	Kevin Love (17)	Luke Ridnour (7)	Oklahoma City Arena; 17,653	4–11
16	November 24	San Antonio	L 109–113 (OT)	Kevin Love (32)	Kevin Love (22)	Luke Ridnour, Sebastian Telfair (5)	Target Center; 13,117	4–12
17	November 27	Golden State	L 94–104	Michael Beasley (28)	Kevin Love (22)	Luke Ridnour (6)	Target Center; 14,440	4–13

December: 4–12 (home: 3–3; road: 1–9)

Game	Date	Team	Score	High points	High rebounds	High assists	Location Attendance	Record
18	December 1	@ Dallas	L 86–100	Michael Beasley (16)	Kevin Love (15)	Kevin Love, Darko Miličić, Luke Ridnour (3)	American Airlines Center; 19,567	4–14
19	December 3	@ San Antonio	L 101–107	Michael Beasley (28)	Kevin Love (18)	Darko Miličić (4)	AT&T Center; 18,581	4–15
20	December 4	Cleveland	W 129–95	Kevin Love (28)	Kevin Love (19)	Sebastian Telfair (7)	Target Center; 14,422	5–15
21	December 6	@ New York	L 114–121	Kevin Love (33)	Kevin Love (15)	Luke Ridnour (4)	Madison Square Garden; 19,763	5–16
22	December 8	Oklahoma City	L 103–111	Michael Beasley (26)	Kevin Love (21)	Luke Ridnour (9)	Target Center; 13,907	5–17
23	December 10	Detroit	W 109–99	Kevin Love (27)	Kevin Love (18)	Luke Ridnour (10)	Target Center; 13,988	6–17
24	December 11	@ Chicago	L 82–113	Kevin Love (23)	Kevin Love (15)	Luke Ridnour (8)	United Center; 21,102	6–18
25	December 14	@ Golden State	L 99–108	Darko Miličić (25)	Kevin Love (14)	Luke Ridnour (11)	Oracle Arena; 17,615	6–19
26	December 15	@ Phoenix	L 122–128	Kevin Love (23)	Kevin Love (16)	Luke Ridnour (8)	US Airways Center; 16,977	6–20
27	December 17	@ Portland	L 102–107	Michael Beasley (33)	Kevin Love (17)	Kevin Love (4)	Rose Garden; 20,310	6–21
28	December 18	@ Denver	L 113–115	Kevin Love (43)	Kevin Love (17)	Luke Ridnour (5)	Pepsi Center; 15,409	6–22
29	December 20	@ L.A. Clippers	L 90–113	Michael Beasley (20)	Kevin Love (10)	Luke Ridnour (6)	Staples Center; 16,053	6–23
30	December 22	Utah	L 107–112	Kevin Love (25)	Kevin Love (19)	Luke Ridnour (5)	Target Center; 15,809	6–24
31	December 26	@ Cleveland	W 98–97	Michael Beasley (28)	Kevin Love (18)	Luke Ridnour (6)	Quicken Loans Arena; 20,562	7–24
32	December 27	New Orleans	W 113–98	Michael Beasley (30)	Kevin Love (11)	Luke Ridnour (11)	Target Center; 11,679	8–24
33	December 29	Denver	L 113–119	Michael Beasley (33)	Kevin Love (14)	Luke Ridnour (8)	Target Center; 17,093	8–25

January: 3–11 (home: 3–6; road: 0–5)

Game	Date	Team	Score	High points	High rebounds	High assists	Location Attendance	Record
34	January 1	New Jersey	W 103–88	Kevin Love (23)	Kevin Love (10)	Luke Ridnour (6)	Target Center; 12,665	9–25
35	January 3	@ Boston	L 93–96	Michael Beasley (19)	Kevin Love (24)	Luke Ridnour (5)	TD Garden; 18,624	9–26
36	January 5	Charlotte	L 105–108 (OT)	Kevin Love (35)	Kevin Love (15)	Kevin Love (5)	Target Center; 14,881	9–27
37	January 7	Portland	L 98–108	Kevin Love (30)	Kevin Love (19)	Luke Ridnour (11)	Target Center; 12,213	9–28
38	January 9	@ San Antonio	L 91–94	Kevin Love (18)	Kevin Love (17)	Luke Ridnour (7)	AT&T Center; 18,581	9–29
39	January 11	San Antonio	L 96–107	Kevin Love (20)	Kevin Love (20)	Luke Ridnour (9)	Target Center; 11,209	9–30
40	January 13	Washington	W 109–97	Kevin Love (35)	Kevin Love, Darko Miličić (11)	Luke Ridnour (9)	Target Center; 11,437	10–30
41	January 15	Orlando	L 99–108	Corey Brewer (23)	Kevin Love (15)	Luke Ridnour (6)	Target Center; 17,391	10–31
42	January 17	@ Portland	L 102–113	Kevin Love, Darko Miličić (22)	Kevin Love (17)	Luke Ridnour (6)	Rose Garden; 20,239	10–32
43	January 19	@ L.A. Clippers	L 111–126	Kevin Love (26)	Kevin Love (11)	Jonny Flynn (6)	Staples Center; 17,793	10–33
44	January 24	Houston	L 125–129	Kevin Love (24)	Kevin Love (17)	Kevin Love (7)	Target Center; 11,983	10–34
45	January 26	Oklahoma City	L 117–118 (OT)	Kevin Love (31)	Kevin Love (21)	Luke Ridnour (8)	Target Center; 14,979	10–35
46	January 28	@ Utah	L 100–108	Kevin Love (22)	Kevin Love (15)	Jonny Flynn (6)	EnergySolutions Arena; 19,911	10–36
47	January 29	Toronto	W 103–87	Kevin Love (21)	Kevin Love (12)	Jonny Flynn (8)	Target Center; 14,991	11–36

February: 3–10 (home: 1–7; road: 2–3)

Game	Date	Team	Score	High points	High rebounds	High assists	Location Attendance	Record
48	February 2	Memphis	L 84–102	Michael Beasley (19)	Kevin Love (10)	Jonny Flynn, Sebastian Telfair (5)	Target Center; 12,662	11–37
49	February 4	@ Toronto	L 100–111	Kevin Love (20)	Kevin Love (15)	Jonny Flynn (7)	Air Canada Centre; 14,389	11–38
50	February 5	Denver	L 100–113	Michael Beasley (23)	Kevin Love (19)	Michael Beasley, Corey Brewer (5)	Target Center; 15,389	11–39
51	February 7	@ New Orleans	W 104–92	Kevin Love (27)	Kevin Love (17)	Jonny Flynn (6)	New Orleans Arena; 13,401	12–39
52	February 8	@ Houston	W 112–108	Kevin Love (20)	Kevin Love (14)	Jonny Flynn (7)	Toyota Center; 15,679	13–39
53	February 11	@ Indiana	L 105–116	Kevin Love (22)	Kevin Love (15)	Sebastian Telfair (4)	Conseco Fieldhouse; 12,559	13–40
54	February 12	Philadelphia	L 87–107	Kevin Love (16)	Kevin Love (13)	Luke Ridnour (5)	Target Center; 17,011	13–41
55	February 14	Portland	L 81–95	Martell Webster (17)	Kevin Love (11)	Wayne Ellington (5)	Target Center; 11,227	13–42
56	February 16	L.A. Clippers	L 90–98	Wayne Ellington, Kevin Love (18)	Kevin Love (18)	Sebastian Telfair (5)	Target Center; 15,227	13–43
All-Star Break
57	February 22	@ Milwaukee	L 88–94	Michael Beasley (21)	Kevin Love (17)	Kevin Love (6)	Bradley Center; 13,106	13–44
58	February 23	Memphis	L 95–104	Wayne Ellington (16)	Kevin Love (11)	Luke Ridnour (5)	Target Center; 11,497	13–45
59	February 25	New Orleans	L 81–95	Wesley Johnson, Luke Ridnour (22)	Kevin Love (14)	Kevin Love (5)	Target Center; 16,965	13–46
60	February 27	Golden State	W 126–123	Kevin Love (37)	Kevin Love (23)	Jonny Flynn (9)	Target Center; 16,021	14–46

March: 3–12 (home: 2–5; road: 1–7)

Game	Date	Team	Score	High points	High rebounds	High assists	Location Attendance	Record
61	March 1	L.A. Lakers	L 79–90	Wesley Johnson (20)	Kevin Love (11)	Jonny Flynn, Luke Ridnour (5)	Target Center; 17,111	14–47
62	March 2	@ Detroit	W 116–105	Kevin Love (20)	Kevin Love (20)	Jonny Flynn (14)	The Palace of Auburn Hills; 13,122	15–47
63	March 4	@ Philadelphia	L 100–111	Kevin Love (21)	Kevin Love (23)	Luke Ridnour (10)	Wells Fargo Center; 12,008	15–48
64	March 5	@ Washington	L 96–103	Kevin Love (20)	Kevin Love (21)	Luke Ridnour (6)	Verizon Center; 18,216	15–49
65	March 7	Dallas	L 105–108	Kevin Love (23)	Kevin Love (17)	Kevin Love (5)	Target Center; 13,288	15–50
66	March 9	Indiana	W 101–75	Michael Beasley, Kevin Love (16)	Kevin Love (21)	Jonny Flynn (6)	Target Center; 15,153	16–50
67	March 11	Utah	W 122–101	Kevin Love (24)	Kevin Love (12)	Luke Ridnour (7)	Target Center; 18,534	17–50
68	March 13	@ Golden State	L 77–100	Michael Beasley, Martell Webster (16)	Kevin Love (12)	Luke Ridnour (6)	Oracle Arena; 17,788	17–51
69	March 16	@ Utah	L 104–119	Kevin Love (22)	Kevin Love (11)	Kevin Love, Luke Ridnour (3)	EnergySolutions Arena; 19,465	17–52
70	March 18	@ L.A. Lakers	L 98–106	Wesley Johnson (29)	Kevin Love (13)	Luke Ridnour (8)	Staples Center; 18,997	17–53
71	March 20	Sacramento	L 95–127	Luke Ridnour (22)	Darko Miličić (6)	Kevin Love, Luke Ridnour (4)	Target Center; 18,993	17–54
72	March 24	@ Dallas	L 96–104	Anthony Randolph (31)	Anthony Randolph (11)	Jonny Flynn (5)	American Airlines Center; 20,296	17–55
73	March 25	@ Oklahoma City	L 103–111	Anthony Randolph (24)	Anthony Randolph (15)	Luke Ridnour (5)	Oklahoma City Arena; 18,203	17–56
74	March 27	Boston	L 82–85	Michael Beasley (28)	Anthony Tolliver (15)	Luke Ridnour (8)	Target Center; 19,178	17–57
75	March 30	Chicago	L 91–108	Kevin Love (16)	Kevin Love (9)	Jonny Flynn (5)	Target Center; 19,207	17–58

April: 0–7 (home: 0–3; road: 0–4)

Game	Date	Team	Score	High points	High rebounds	High assists	Location Attendance	Record
76	April 1	Miami	L 92–111	Martell Webster (22)	Kevin Love (7)	Luke Ridnour (9)	Target Center; 19,096	17–59
77	April 2	@ Memphis	L 89–106	Michael Beasley (20)	Nikola Peković (6)	Michael Beasley, Wesley Johnson, Anthony Tolliver (4)	FedExForum; 15,327	17–60
78	April 5	@ New Jersey	L 105–107	Anthony Randolph (20)	Michael Beasley (11)	Luke Ridnour (9)	Prudential Center; 13,461	17–61
79	April 6	Phoenix	L 98–108	Michael Beasley (24)	Michael Beasley (11)	Luke Ridnour (5)	Target Center; 16,113	17–62
80	April 9	@ Denver	L 106–130	Lazar Hayward, Martell Webster (15)	Anthony Tolliver (7)	Jonny Flynn (9)	Pepsi Center; 19,155	17–63
81	April 11	@ Phoenix	L 127–135 (OT)	Michael Beasley (26)	Anthony Randolph, Anthony Tolliver (10)	Luke Ridnour (9)	US Airways Center; 17,485	17–64
82	April 13	Houston	L 102–121	Michael Beasley (34)	Anthony Tolliver (13)	Luke Ridnour (11)	Target Center; 17,101	17–65

2010–11 season schedule

== Player statistics ==
=== Regular season ===
Player	POS	GP	GS	MP	REB	AST	STL	BLK	PTS	MPG	RPG	APG	SPG	BPG	PPG
Wesley Johnson	SG	79	63	2,069	240	148	58	54	709	26.2	3.0	1.9	.7	.7	9.0
Kevin Love	PF	73	73	2,611	1,112	184	45	28	1,476	35.8	15.2	2.5	.6	.4	20.2
Michael Beasley	SF	73	73	2,361	409	158	54	52	1,401	32.3	5.6	2.2	.7	.7	19.2
Luke Ridnour	PG	71	66	2,159	199	384	89	10	840	30.4	2.8	5.4	1.3	.1	11.8
Darko Miličić	C	69	69	1,686	360	104	54	140	606	24.4	5.2	1.5	.8	2.0	8.8
Nikola Peković	C	65	11	887	193	27	18	35	359	13.6	3.0	.4	.3	.5	5.5
Anthony Tolliver	SF	65	4	1,362	295	82	28	28	434	21.0	4.5	1.3	.4	.4	6.7
Wayne Ellington	SG	62	8	1,181	108	72	28	3	410	19.0	1.7	1.2	.5	.0	6.6
Corey Brewer^{†}	SF	56	22	1,362	152	77	89	14	483	24.3	2.7	1.4	1.6	.3	8.6
Jonny Flynn	PG	53	8	983	77	182	34	3	279	18.5	1.5	3.4	.6	.1	5.3
Martell Webster	SF	46	1	1,094	147	53	28	9	453	23.8	3.2	1.2	.6	.2	9.8
Lazar Hayward	SF	42	0	419	70	28	12	7	160	10.0	1.7	.7	.3	.2	3.8
Kosta Koufos^{†}	C	39	1	336	97	7	8	20	106	8.6	2.5	.2	.2	.5	2.7
Sebastian Telfair	PG	37	8	711	54	111	25	3	266	19.2	1.5	3.0	.7	.1	7.2
Anthony Randolph^{†}	C	23	3	463	120	26	18	16	270	20.1	5.2	1.1	.8	.7	11.7
Sundiata Gaines^{†}	PG	8	0	65	6	6	3	0	21	8.1	.8	.8	.4	.0	2.6
Maurice Ager	SG	4	0	29	2	1	1	0	15	7.3	.5	.3	.3	.0	3.8

- ^{†} Denotes player spent time with another team in the season. Stats reflect time with the Timberwolves only.

== Transactions ==
=== Trades ===
June 24, 2010
To Portland Trail Blazers----
- No. 16 pick (Luke Babbitt),
  (United States) Ryan Gomes
To Minnesota Timberwolves----
- (United States) Martell Webster
June 24, 2010
To Minnesota Timberwolves----
- No. 30 pick (Lazar Hayward),
  No. 35 pick (Nemanja Bjelica)
To Washington Wizards----
- No. 23 pick (Trevor Booker),
  No. 56 pick (Hamady Ndiaye)
July 12, 2010
To Miami Heat----
- 2011 second-round pick (Bojan Bogdanovic)
  2014 second-round pick
  Cash considerations
To Minnesota Timberwolves----
- (United States) Michael Beasley
July 13, 2010
To Minnesota Timberwolves----
- (Greece) Kosta Koufos
  2011 protected first-round pick (Donatas Motiejūnas)
  Future protected first-round pick
To Utah Jazz----
- (United States) Al Jefferson
July 26, 2010
To Cleveland Cavaliers----
- (United States) Ramon Sessions
  (United States) Ryan Hollins
  Future second-round pick
To Minnesota Timberwolves----
- (United States) Delonte West
  (United States) Sebastian Telfair
January 21, 2011
To New York Knicks----
- (United States) Carmelo Anthony
  (United States) Renaldo Balkman
  (United States) Chauncey Billups
  (United States) Anthony Carter
  (United States) Shelden Williams
  (United States) Corey Brewer
To Denver Nuggets----
- (United States) Wilson Chandler
  (United States) Raymond Felton
  (Italy) Danilo Gallinari
  (Russia) Timofey Mozgov
  (Greece) Kosta Koufos
  2014 first round pick (of the New York Knicks)
  2012 second-round pick (of the Golden State Warriors)
  2013 second-round pick (of the Golden State Warriors)
  $3 million
To Minnesota Timberwolves----
- (United States) Eddy Curry
  (United States) Anthony Randolph

=== Free agents ===
==== Additions ====
Player	Signed	Former team
Darko Miličić	Signed four-year contract	New York Knicks
Luke Ridnour	Signed four-year contract for $16 million	Milwaukee Bucks
Anthony Tolliver	Signed two-year contract for $4.5 million	Golden State Warriors

==== Subtractions ====
Player	Signed
Sundiata Gaines	Waived
Delonte West	Waived
Jason Hart	Waived
Maurice Ager	Waived
Eddy Curry	Waived
