= Johnny Flynn (disambiguation) =

Johnny Flynn (born 1983) is a British musician and actor.

Johnny Flynn may also refer to:

- Johnny Flynn (footballer) (born 1989)

== See also ==
- Jonny Flynn (born 1989), basketball player
