= John B. Alexander High School =

High school in Texas, United States

Location
- 3600 E. Del Mar Blvd; Laredo, Texas 78041; United States; 27°34′54″N 99°26′51″W

Information
- Type: Public
- Motto: Pure Breed of Knowledge.
- Established: 1994; 32 years ago
- School district: United Independent School District
- Principal: Rosana Arizola
- Teaching staff: 168.80 (FTE)
- Grades: 9 through 12
- Enrollment: 3,070 (2022–23)
- Student to teacher ratio: 18.19
- Colors: Blue and Vegas gold
- Mascot: Bulldog
- Website: ahs.uisd.net

John B. Alexander High School, also shortened simply to Alexander High School, is a secondary school in Laredo, Texas, United States and a part of the United Independent School District.

The high school was established in 1994 to alleviate overcrowding at United High School in northern sector of Laredo. Freshman students are housed in a separate building at 4601 Victory Drive.

The mascot for Alexander High School is a Bulldog.

== Magnet school ==
John B. Alexander High School also houses John B. Alexander High School Health Science Magnet School, a magnet school that focuses on health science education.

== Fine arts programs ==
John B. Alexander High School has four fine arts programs: orchestra (John B. Alexander Orchestra), mariachi (Mariachi Monumental de Oro), choir (John B. Alexander Choir), and band (John B. Alexander Band) programs. The John B. Alexander Outdoor Performance Ensemble is a three-time South Texas Regional Grand Champion and three-time Area G champion.

== Notable alumni ==
- Kaleb Canales, Class of 1996, basketball coach
- Carlos Mercado, soccer player
- Roxanne Perez, Class of 2020, professional wrestler
