= Luke Babbitt =

American basketball player (born 1989)

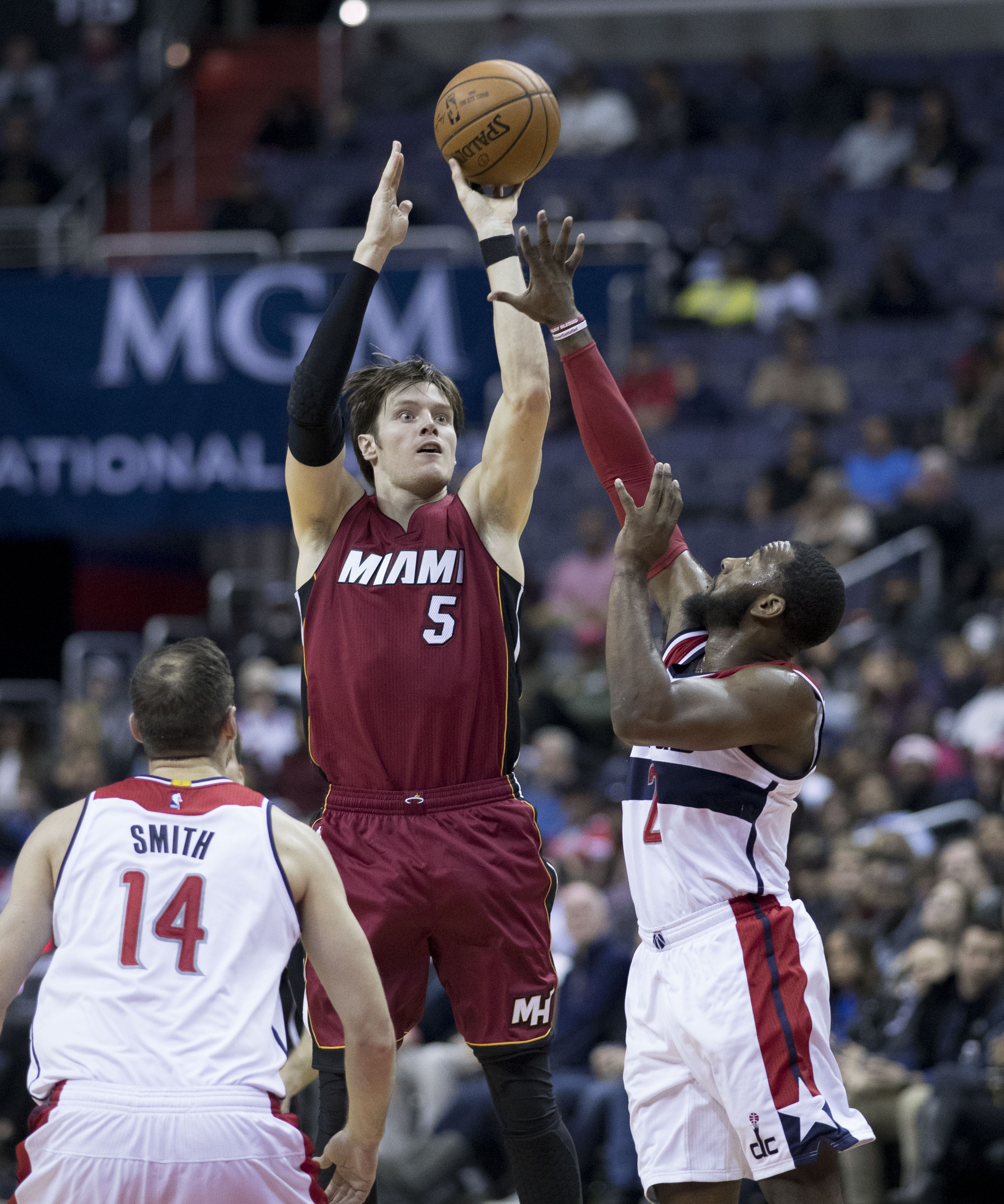
- Babbitt with the Miami Heat in 2016

Personal information
- Born: June 20, 1989 (age 37) Cincinnati, Ohio, U.S.
- Listed height: 6 ft 9 in (2.06 m)
- Listed weight: 225 lb (102 kg)

Career information
- High school: Galena (Reno, Nevada)
- College: Nevada (2008–2010)
- NBA draft: 2010: 1st round, 16th overall pick
- Drafted by: Minnesota Timberwolves
- Playing career: 2010–2018
- Position: Small forward / power forward
- Number: 11, 8, 5, 22
- Coaching career: 2022–present

Career history

Playing
- 2010–2013: Portland Trail Blazers
- 2010–2012: →Idaho Stampede
- 2013–2014: Nizhny Novgorod
- 2014–2016: New Orleans Pelicans
- 2016–2017: Miami Heat
- 2017–2018: Atlanta Hawks
- 2018: Miami Heat

Coaching
- 2022–present: Bishop Manogue HS

Career highlights
- WAC Player of the Year (2010); 2× First-team All-WAC (2009, 2010); Second-team Parade All-American (2008); McDonald's All-American (2008)
- Stats at NBA.com
- Stats at Basketball Reference

Luke Robert Babbitt (born June 20, 1989) is an American former professional basketball player. He played college basketball for the Nevada Wolf Pack before declaring for the 2010 NBA draft following his sophomore year. He was selected by the Minnesota Timberwolves with the 16th overall pick in the 2010 NBA draft, then traded to the Portland Trail Blazers.

== Early life ==
Babbitt was born in Cincinnati, Ohio. At the age of nine his family moved to Reno, Nevada. Babbitt attended Galena High School, where he was a 3-time All-State performer and a two-time Gatorade State Player of the Year in basketball. As a junior, Babbitt averaged 27.8 points and 9.5 rebounds per game while leading Galena to a state championship. Babbitt finished his high school career by scoring 2,941 points, which broke future college teammate Armon Johnson's Nevada state scoring record of 2,616 points.

Considered a four-star recruit by Rivals.com, Babbitt was listed as the No. 12 power forward and the No. 31 player in the nation in 2008.

== College career ==
After originally verbally committing to Ohio State, Babbitt backed out and decided to attend the University of Nevada. In his first game, Babbitt recorded a 20-point, 12-rebound double-double versus Montana State. He went on to average 16.9 points per game during his freshman year including a season-high 30 points on March 12, 2009, versus San Jose State.

In his sophomore season, Babbitt led the team in scoring with 21.9 points per game. He scored a career-high 33 points in the Western Athletic Conference tournament semifinals on March 13, 2010, versus New Mexico State. Despite losing that game and ending their hopes of going to the NCAA Tournament, Nevada was invited to the NIT, where they lost in the second round to the University of Rhode Island.

On April 20, 2010, Babbitt hired an agent and declared for the NBA draft.

== Professional career ==
=== Portland Trail Blazers (2010–2013) ===
Babbitt was selected with the 16th overall pick by the Minnesota Timberwolves in the 2010 NBA draft. His rights were later traded, along with Wolves forward Ryan Gomes, to the Portland Trail Blazers in exchange for Martell Webster. On July 9, 2010, Babbitt signed his rookie contract with the Blazers. He then joined the Blazers for the 2010 NBA Summer League.

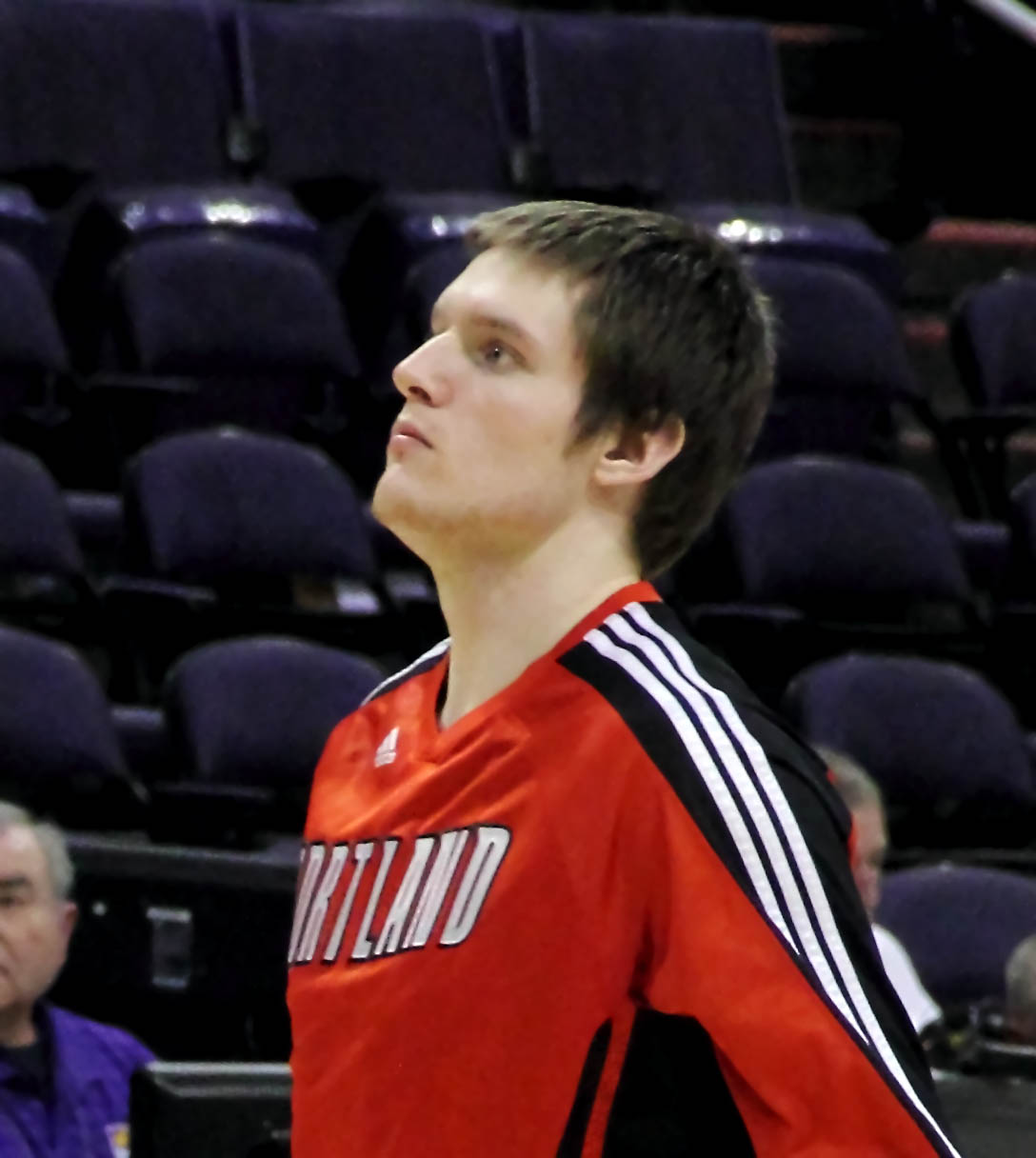
Babbitt in 2011 with the Portland Trail Blazers

On December 8, 2010, Babbitt was assigned to the Idaho Stampede of the NBA D-League. On December 18, 2010, he was recalled by the Trail Blazers. On March 3, 2011, he was reassigned to the Idaho Stampede. On March 28, 2011, he was recalled by the Trail Blazers. On January 4, 2012, he was reassigned to the Idaho Stampede. On January 10, 2012, he was recalled again.

Babbitt joined the Trail Blazers for the 2012 NBA Summer League.

=== Nizhny Novgorod (2013–2014) ===
In August 2013, Babbitt signed with Nizhny Novgorod of Russia for the 2013–14 season. In January 2014, he left Russia under controversial circumstances.

=== New Orleans Pelicans (2014–2016) ===
On February 4, 2014, Babbitt signed with the New Orleans Pelicans. On July 20, 2015, he re-signed with the Pelicans.

=== Miami Heat (2016–2017) ===
On July 10, 2016, Babbitt was traded to the Miami Heat in exchange for a 2018 second-round draft pick and cash considerations.

=== Atlanta Hawks (2017–2018) ===
Babbitt signed with the Atlanta Hawks on August 9, 2017.

=== Return to Miami (2018) ===
Babbitt was traded back to the Heat on February 8, 2018, in exchange for Okaro White.

== Career statistics ==
Legend
GP	Games played	GS	Games started	MPG	Minutes per game
FG%	Field goal percentage	3P%	3-point field goal percentage	FT%	Free throw percentage
RPG	Rebounds per game	APG	Assists per game	SPG	Steals per game
BPG	Blocks per game	PPG	Points per game	**Bold**	Career high

=== NBA ===
==== Regular season ====
Year	Team	GP	GS	MPG	FG%	3P%	FT%	RPG	APG	SPG	BPG	PPG
2010–11	Portland	24	0	5.7	.273	.188	.333	1.3	.3	.1	.1	1.5
2011–12	Portland	40	4	13.4	.410	.430	**.850**	2.4	.4	**.3**	.1	5.1
2012–13	Portland	62	0	11.8	.368	.348	.769	2.2	.5	.2	.1	3.9
2013–14	New Orleans	27	2	17.5	.390	.379	.778	**3.3**	**1.1**	**.3**	**.4**	6.3
2014–15	New Orleans	63	19	13.2	**.479**	**.513**	.684	1.8	.4	**.3**	.2	4.1
2015–16	New Orleans	47	13	**18.0**	.422	.404	.780	3.1	**1.1**	.2	.1	**7.0**
2016–17	Miami	**68**	**55**	15.7	.402	.414	.733	2.1	.5	**.3**	.2	4.8
2017–18	Atlanta	37	9	15.4	.476	.441	.773	2.2	.7	.2	.1	6.1
2017–18	Miami	13	5	11.2	.234	.244	.000	1.2	.4	.1	.2	2.5
Career		381	107	14.0	.408	.402	.747	2.2	.6	.2	.2	4.8

==== Playoffs ====
Year	Team	GP	GS	MPG	FG%	3P%	FT%	RPG	APG	SPG	BPG	PPG
2018	Miami	2	0	1.5	.000	–	–	.0	.0	.0	.0	.0
Career		2	0	1.5	.000	–	–	.0	.0	.0	.0	.0

=== College ===
Year	Team	GP	GS	MPG	FG%	3P%	FT%	RPG	APG	SPG	BPG	PPG
2008–09	Nevada	**34**	**34**	32.6	.456	**.429**	.864	7.4	1.4	.7	.7	16.9
2009–10	Nevada	**34**	**34**	**37.1**	**.500**	.416	**.917**	**8.9**	**2.1**	**1.0**	**.8**	**21.9**
Career		68	68	34.9	.480	.421	.893	8.1	1.8	.9	.8	19.4

== Awards and recognition ==
- 2008–09 WAC Freshman of the Year
- 2008–09 WAC 1st Team All- Conference
- 2008–09 WAC Newcomer of the Year
- 2009–10 WAC All-Decade Team
- 2009–10 ESPN The Magazine Academic All-American
- 2009–10 AP All American Honorable Mention
- 2009–10 Naismith Award mid-season finalist
- 2009–10 WAC Player of the Year
- 2009–10 WAC 1st Team All- Conference
- 2008–2010 2× WAC All-Tournament Team
- 2023 Galena High School Athletic Hall of Fame Award

== See also ==
- List of National Basketball Association career 3-point field goal percentage leaders
