= Armon Johnson =

American basketball player (born 1989)

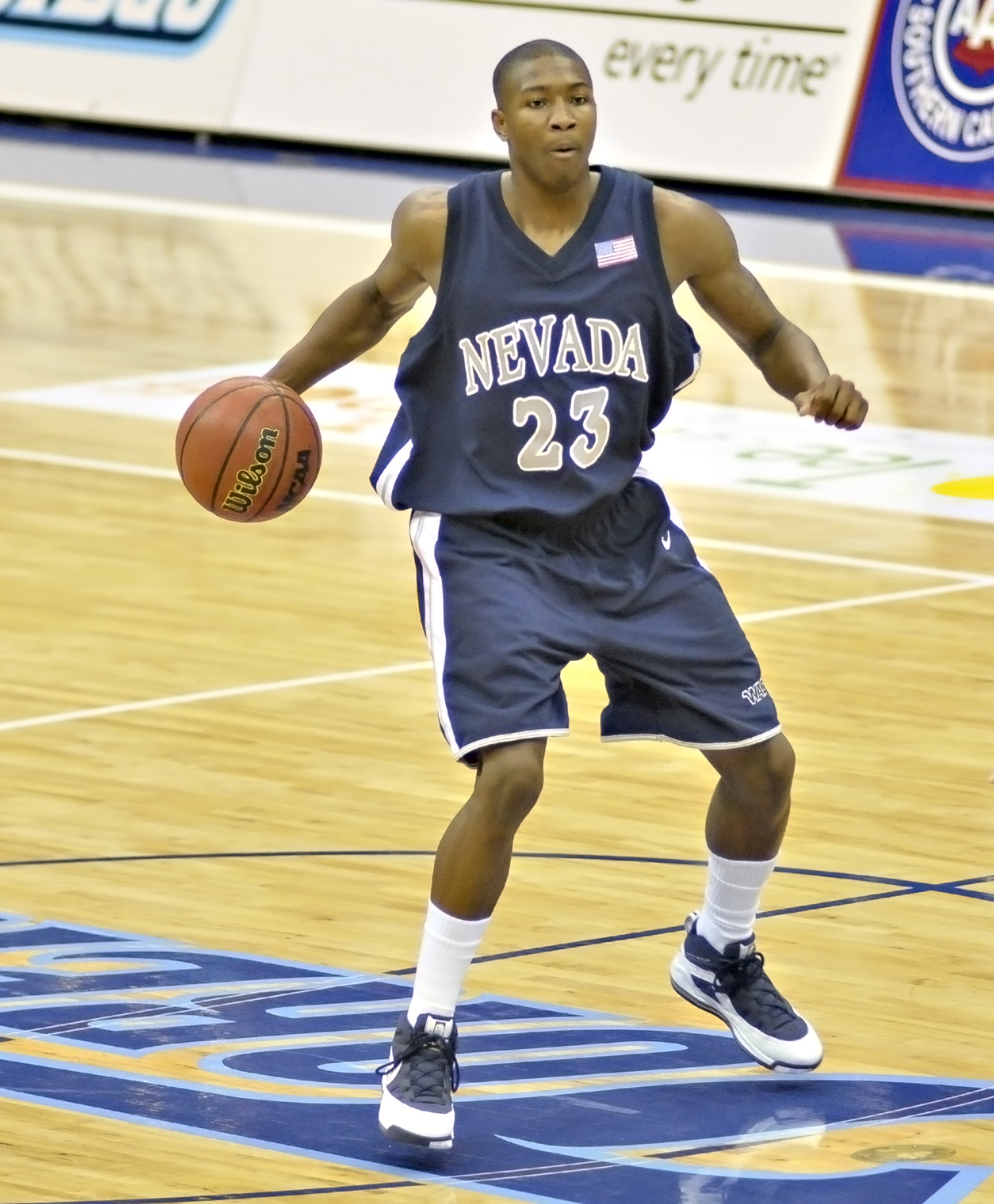
- Johnson as a member of the Nevada Wolf Pack men's basketball team

Personal information
- Born: February 23, 1989 (age 37) Chicago, Illinois, U.S.
- Listed height: 6 ft 3 in (1.91 m)
- Listed weight: 195 lb (88 kg)

Career information
- High school: Hug (Reno, Nevada)
- College: Nevada (2007–2010)
- NBA draft: 2010: 2nd round, 34th overall pick
- Drafted by: Portland Trail Blazers
- Playing career: 2010–2017
- Position: Point guard
- Number: 1, 7

Career history
- 2010–2012: Portland Trail Blazers
- 2011–2012: →Idaho Stampede
- 2012: New Jersey Nets
- 2012: Astana
- 2014: Valladolid
- 2014: Le Mans Sarthe
- 2015: Austin Spurs
- 2016–2017: Nevada Senators

Career highlights
- First-team All-WAC (2009); Second-team All-WAC (2010); WAC Freshman of the Year (2008); WAC All-Newcomer Team (2008)
- Stats at NBA.com
- Stats at Basketball Reference

Armon Deshawn Johnson (born February 23, 1989) is an American former professional basketball player who played two seasons in the National Basketball Association (NBA). He played college basketball for Nevada.

== College career ==
In his three-year career at Nevada, Johnson averaged 14.3 points, 3.7 rebounds and 4.4 assists in 101 games.

== Professional career ==
Johnson was selected by the Portland Trail Blazers with the 34th overall pick in the 2010 NBA draft. On August 2, 2010, he signed with the Trail Blazers after averaging 11.6 points and 4.2 assists in five summer league games. After a promising debut game on October 26, 2010, in which he scored six points with two rebounds and three assists in nine minutes, Johnson went on to have three double-figure scoring games in November, reaching a high in playing time of 22 minutes. However, his minutes and production declined over the following two months.

On January 28, 2011, he was assigned to the Idaho Stampede of the NBA Development League. He was recalled on February 22, 2011, then reassigned on January 4, 2012, and recalled again on January 15, 2012. On February 27, 2012, he was waived by the Trail Blazers. He signed a ten-day contract with the New Jersey Nets on April 9, 2012. On April 20, he signed with the Nets for the rest of the season.

On September 29, 2012, Johnson signed with the Orlando Magic. However, he was later waived by the Magic on October 23, 2012, after appearing in five preseason games. In December 2012, he joined Kazakh powerhouse team BC Astana. After scoring 13 points in his debut for Astana on December 16, he was ruled out for the rest of the season with a serious knee injury.

In March 2014, after passing a tryout period, Johnson signed with the Spanish team CB Valladolid for the rest of the season.

On July 7, 2014, Johnson joined the Los Angeles Clippers for the 2014 NBA Summer League. On July 29, he signed with Le Mans Sarthe Basket of France for the 2014–15 season. On October 29, 2014, he was waived by Le Mans after appearing in just five games. On April 2, 2015, he was acquired by the Austin Spurs of the NBA Development League.

On August 14, 2015, Johnson signed with Göttingen of the German Basketball Bundesliga. On September 15, 2015, he parted ways with Göttingen before the start of the season.

In 2016, he joined the Nevada Senators ABA team in Reno, Nevada.

== Coaching career ==
Following his professional career, Johnson returned to the University of Nevada, Reno as an undergrad assistant under Head Coach Eric Musselman. After a couple year stint with the Wolf Pack, he was hired as the head coach of Excel Christian School, a small 1A academy in Sparks, Nevada. In his one season at Excel Christian School, Johnson failed to win a game, going 0–12. In May 2021, Johnson was hired as the head varsity basketball coach for Robert McQueen High School where he currently coaches. As of December 31, 2021, Johnson is 7–2 with the Lancers. His overall prep coaching record stands at 7–14.

== Career statistics ==
Legend
GP	Games played	GS	Games started	MPG	Minutes per game
FG%	Field goal percentage	3P%	3-point field goal percentage	FT%	Free throw percentage
RPG	Rebounds per game	APG	Assists per game	SPG	Steals per game
BPG	Blocks per game	PPG	Points per game	**Bold**	Career high

=== NBA ===
==== Regular season ====
Year	Team	GP	GS	MPG	FG%	3P%	FT%	RPG	APG	SPG	BPG	PPG
2010–11	Portland	**38**	0	7.3	.455	**.417**	.591	.9	1.2	.1	.0	2.9
2011–12	Portland	1	0	5.0	**1.000**	–	–	1.0	.0	**1.0**	.0	2.0
2011–12	New Jersey	8	0	**14.9**	.452	.333	**1.000**	**1.5**	**1.4**	.5	.0	**5.6**
Career		47	0	8.5	.458	.400	.679	1.0	1.2	.2	.0	3.3

==== Playoffs ====
Year	Team	GP	GS	MPG	FG%	3P%	FT%	RPG	APG	SPG	BPG	PPG
2011	Portland	2	0	.0	–	–	–	.5	.0	.0	.0	.0
