= Kaleb Canales =

American basketball coach (born 1978)

Weber State Wildcats
- Position: Head Coach
- Conference: Big Sky Conference

Personal information
- Born: July 7, 1978 (age 48) Laredo, Texas, U.S.

Career information
- High school: John B. Alexander (Laredo, Texas)
- College: Laredo CC; UT Arlington
- Coaching career: 2001–present

Career history

Coaching
- 2001–2002: Martin HS (assistant)
- 2002–2003: United HS (assistant)
- 2003–2004: UT Arlington (assistant)
- 2008–2012: Portland Trail Blazers (assistant)
- 2012: Portland Trail Blazers (interim HC)
- 2012–2013: Portland Trail Blazers (assistant)
- 2013–2018: Dallas Mavericks (assistant)
- 2018–2020: New York Knicks (assistant)
- 2020–2021: Indiana Pacers (assistant)
- 2021–2023: Orlando Magic (assistant)
- 2021: Mexico (Assistant)
- 2023–2025: Texas Legends (assistant)
- 2025: Calgary Surge
- 2025–2026: Troy (associate HC)
- 2026–present: Weber State

Victor Kaleb Canales (born July 7, 1978) is an American basketball coach who serves as the Head Coach for the Weber State Wildcats.

== Early life ==
Born in Laredo, Texas, Canales is a graduate of John B. Alexander High School. He graduated from the University of Texas at Arlington with a degree in kinesiology. He later earned a master's degree in sports leadership from Virginia Commonwealth University. He did not play college basketball at any level.

== Coaching career ==
=== Early career ===
Canales began his coaching career as an assistant coach in 2001 at United High School in Laredo, Texas. The following year, he became an assistant coach at Martin High School, also in Laredo. In 2003, Canales returned to UT Arlington to be an assistant coach.

=== NBA Assistant (2008–2025) ===
In 2005, Canales was hired as a video intern for the Portland Trail Blazers, and was eventually hired as the team's video coordinator. In 2009, he was promoted to an assistant coach for the team. In 2010, Canales served as the Trail Blazers' head coach during the NBA Summer League. He was promoted to interim head coach of the Trail Blazers after head coach Nate McMillan was dismissed on March 15, 2012. Canales became the youngest active head coach in the NBA and the first Mexican-American coach in NBA history. In 2012, Portland hired Terry Stotts as their head coach, but Canales remained with the team as an assistant.

On May 3, 2013, Canales accepted an assistant coaching job with the Dallas Mavericks.

In 2018, Canales was hired as an assistant coach for the New York Knicks under David Fizdale. Canales remained with the team after Fizdale was fired in 2019 and worked under interim head coach Mike Miller.

On November 13, 2020, Canales was hired as an assistant coach by the Indiana Pacers under Nate Bjorkgren.

On October 9, 2023, Canales was hired as an associate head coach for the Texas Legends of the NBA G League.

=== Weber State (2026–present) ===
On April 3, 2026, Canales was introduced as the next head men's basketball coach at Weber State University. He had spent the previous season as an assistant coach at Troy University.

== Head coaching record ==
=== NCAA ===
Record table
| Season | Team | Overall | Conference | Standing | Postseason |
|---|---|---|---|---|---|
Weber State Wildcats (Big Sky Conference) (2026–present)
| 2026–27 | Weber State | 0–0 | 0–0 | | |
| Weber State: | | 0–0 (–) | 0–0 (–) | | |
| Total: | | 0–0 (–) | | | |
National champion Postseason invitational champion Conference regular season champion Conference regular season and conference tournament champion Division regular season champion Division regular season and conference tournament champion Conference tournament champion

=== NBA ===
Legend
| Regular season | G | Games coached | W | Games won | L | Games lost | W–L % | Win–loss % |
| Playoffs | PG | Playoff games | PW | Playoff wins | PL | Playoff losses | PW–L % | Playoff win–loss % |

| Team | Year | G | W | L | W–L% | Finish | PG | PW | PL | PW–L% | Result |
|---|---|---|---|---|---|---|---|---|---|---|---|
| Portland | 2011–12 | 23 | 8 | 15 | .348 | 4th in Northwest | — | — | — | — | Missed playoffs |
| Career | | 23 | 8 | 15 | .348 | | — | — | — | — | |
