= Jonny Flynn =

American basketball player (born 1989)

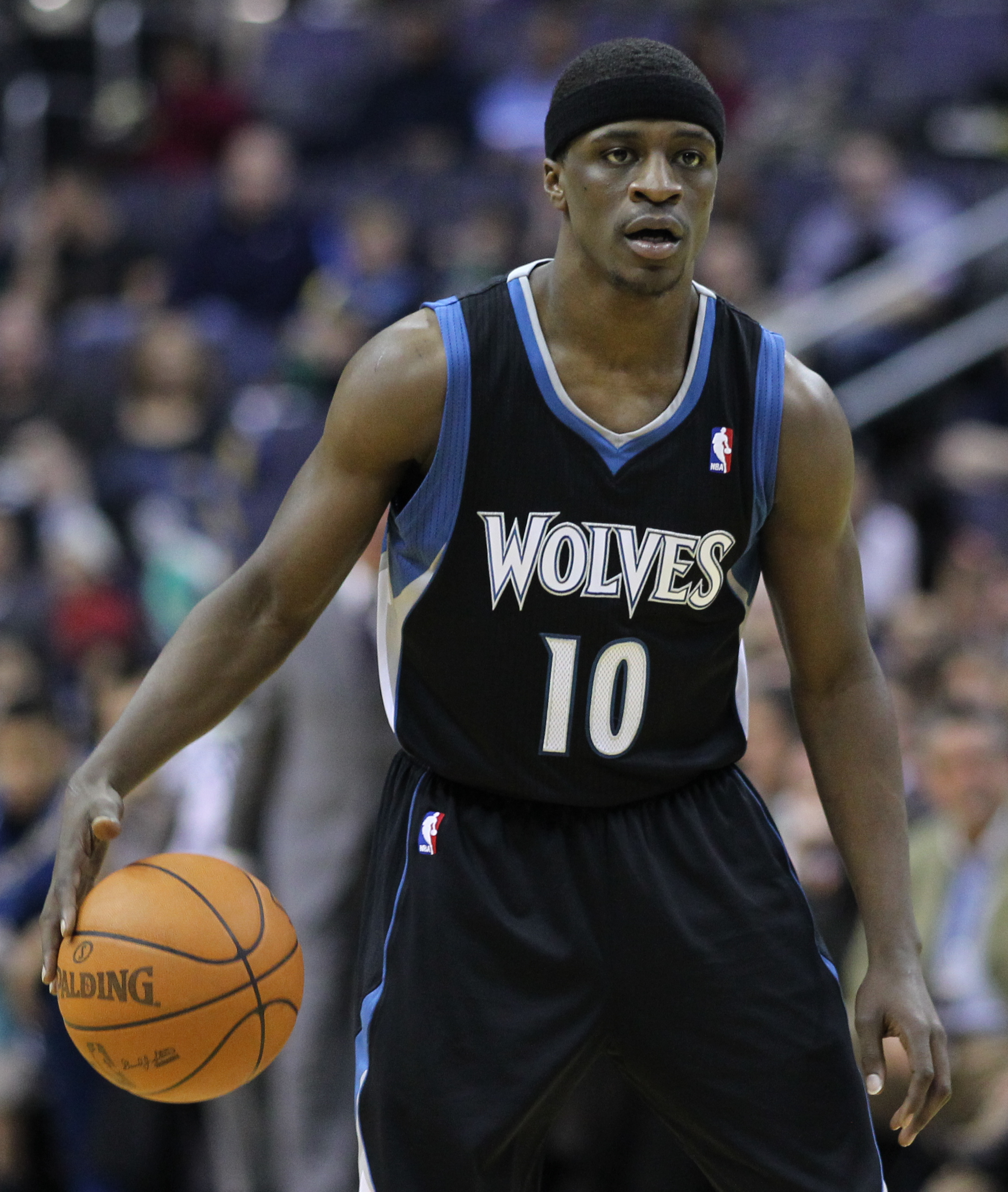
- Flynn with the Timberwolves in 2011

Personal information
- Born: February 6, 1989 (age 37) Niagara Falls, New York, U.S.
- Listed height: 6 ft 0 in (1.83 m)
- Listed weight: 194 lb (88 kg)

Career information
- High school: Niagara Falls (Niagara Falls, New York)
- College: Syracuse (2007–2009)
- NBA draft: 2009: 1st round, 6th overall pick
- Drafted by: Minnesota Timberwolves
- Playing career: 2009–2014
- Position: Point guard

Career history
- 2009–2011: Minnesota Timberwolves
- 2010: →Sioux Falls Skyforce
- 2011–2012: Houston Rockets
- 2012: Portland Trail Blazers
- 2012–2013: Melbourne Tigers
- 2014: Orlandina Basket

Career highlights
- NBA All-Rookie Second Team (2010); NBL All-Star (2012); All-NBL Second Team (2013); Big East Rookie of the Year (2008); Big East tournament MVP (2009); Second-team Parade All-American (2007); McDonald's All-American (2007); Mr. New York Basketball (2007)
- Stats at NBA.com
- Stats at Basketball Reference
Medals
Representing United States
FIBA U19 World Championship
Silver medal – second place	2007 Serbia	Team competition
FIBA Americas U18 Championship
Gold medal – first place	2006 San Antonio	Team competition

Jonny William Flynn (born February 6, 1989) is an American former professional basketball player. A three-year National Basketball Association (NBA) veteran, he last played for the Orlandina Basket of the Lega Basket Serie A and played collegiate basketball for the Syracuse Orange.

== High school career ==
Flynn and Niagara Falls High School won the 2005 New York state public high school and federation championships. He was also named New York State Mr. Basketball following his senior year. When he graduated with the class of 2007, he was ranked the No. 22 overall recruit and No. 4 point guard by Rivals.com as well as the No. 23 overall and the No. 4 point guard by Scout.com. Flynn was a 2007 McDonald's All-American and he was named to the 2007 USA Basketball Junior National Select Team that competed against the World Select Team in the 10th annual Nike Hoop Summit in Memphis, Tennessee. Flynn was a former high school and college teammate of guard/forward Paul Harris, whom he played alongside as members of the Minnesota Timberwolves' summer league team. In his senior year, Flynn averaged 26.7 points, 6.0 assists, 3.5 steals and 3.3 rebounds.

In 2009 as The Buffalo News celebrated 50 years of All-Western New York (WNY) basketball selections, Flynn, who was twice an All-WNY first team selection was a third team selection for the All-time All-WNY team along with Gary Bossert, Jason Rowe, Aaron Curry, and Jimmy "Bug" Williams.

== College career ==
=== 2007–08 ===
In his first game ever, on November 12, 2007, Flynn scored 28 points, which eclipsed former Orange standout Carmelo Anthony's record for most points in a freshman's debut. Later in the season, he matched his debut performance with another 28-point effort in an 82–77 loss to Pittsburgh on March 21, 2008. Flynn would go on to have a prolific freshman year, collecting co-Big East Rookie of the Year honors, with averages of 15.7 points and 5.3 assists per game. Flynn and fellow freshman Donté Greene were the second-highest-scoring freshman duo in the country, combining to average 33.4 points per outing.

=== 2008–09 ===
Flynn was named to the preseason All Big East team and started the season with a 27-point effort against Richmond on November 18, 2008. Seven days later, Flynn scored 25 points and hit a 3-pointer with 6.4 seconds left in regulation as Syracuse defeated then-No. 23 ESPN/USA Today, No. 22 AP Kansas 89–81 in overtime in the championship game of the CBE Classic. Flynn was named MVP of the Tournament.

Flynn's leaping ability was on display in a January 11, 2009, game against Rutgers. With Syracuse clinging to a 52–48 lead, Flynn drove to the hoop and threw down a monstrous dunk over opposing guard Michael Rosario as he attempted to draw a charge.

In the quarterfinals of the 2009 Big East tournament on March 12 and 13, Flynn led the Orange to a 127–117 win in six overtimes over the favored Connecticut Huskies. Flynn played 67 out of a possible 70 minutes on the floor that evening, leading the Orange by scoring 34 points, adding 11 assists and making all 16 of his free throw attempts. The next day, Flynn then played all 45 minutes of Syracuse's 74–69 overtime victory over West Virginia in the Big East semifinals. He scored 15 points and had 9 assists. Syracuse, however, would eventually fall to Louisville in the Big East championship game, 76–66. For his efforts, Flynn was named the 2009 Big East tournament's MVP, the fourth player from the losing team to win the award in the tournament's history.

In his first career NCAA tournament game in 2009, Flynn led all scorers in their first-round matchup against Stephen F. Austin, tallying 16 points and 7 assists. Syracuse went on to win the game 59–44. On March 22, 2009, Flynn scored 11 points and add 7 assists as Syracuse defeated Arizona State 78–67 advancing Syracuse to its first Sweet Sixteen since 2004.

On April 9, 2009, it was announced by Syracuse University that Flynn would declare himself eligible for the upcoming NBA draft. However, Flynn would retain his NCAA eligibility by not immediately hiring an agent. Flynn officially decided to forgo his final two years at Syracuse and signed with Creative Artists Agency Sports, run by agent Leon Rose, on April 15. He was ultimately drafted sixth overall by the Minnesota Timberwolves in the 2009 NBA draft.

== Professional career ==
=== Minnesota Timberwolves (2009–2011) ===
Flynn was drafted sixth overall in the 2009 NBA draft by the Minnesota Timberwolves, notably just one selection ahead of future two-time MVP Stephen Curry at the point guard position. Expectations were very high for Flynn as he was seen as the future cornerstone point guard for the Timberwolves by GM David Kahn. Flynn's stats were solid for his rookie season: he averaged 13.5 points per game and 4.4 assists per game.

On October 28, 2009, Flynn made his professional debut and sparked a rally for the Timberwolves, coming back from 19 points down. Flynn scored 13 points in the 4th quarter to lead the Timberwolves to a victory over the New Jersey Nets. On December 14, 2009, he made the driving game-winning layup to beat the Utah Jazz 110–108, scoring 28 points.

On January 18, 2010, he set a new career high with 29 points against the Philadelphia 76ers in a 108–103 overtime victory. At the end of the season, Flynn was selected to the All-Rookie second team. On January 31, 2010, Flynn had a career-high eight rebounds in a 112–91 win over the New York Knicks.

Flynn underwent hip surgery during the summer of 2010. This surgery caused Flynn's decline in production and play. His 2010–11 campaign was widely considered to be a disappointment, as his numbers dipped to 5.3 points per game and only 3.4 assists per game. This led to much speculation of his departure following the season.

On March 2, 2011, Flynn dropped a career-high 14 assists in a 116–105 win over the Detroit Pistons.

=== Houston Rockets (2011–2012) ===
During the 2011 NBA draft, Flynn was traded to the Houston Rockets, along with Donatas Motiejūnas, in exchange for Brad Miller, the number 23 and 38 picks in the draft, and a future first-round draft pick. The number 23 pick became Nikola Mirotić and the number 38 pick became Chandler Parsons.

=== Portland Trail Blazers (2012) ===
On March 15, 2012, Flynn was traded to the Portland Trail Blazers, along with Hasheem Thabeet and a future second-round pick (Will Barton was later selected), for Marcus Camby.

=== Melbourne Tigers (2012–2013) ===
On October 1, 2012, Flynn signed with the Detroit Pistons. On October 22, 2012, Flynn was waived by the Pistons.

On November 5, 2012, Flynn signed with the Melbourne Tigers of the Australian National Basketball League. In his first game in the NBL, and after only a few days of preparation, Flynn was impressive with 12 points, eight rebounds, seven assists, and one block and lifted the struggling Tigers to a dominant 96–66 win over the Adelaide 36ers.

Flynn continued to have an impact on the NBL and, following an injury to Kevin Lisch, was selected as the substitute starting point guard for the South All-Stars in their 134–114 win over the North All-Stars in the 2012 NBL All-Star Game held at the Adelaide Arena on December 22, 2012. In 19:56 of game time, Flynn recorded seven points, five rebounds and ten assists.

Flynn joined the Indiana Pacers for the 2013 Orlando Summer League. He then joined the Los Angeles Clippers for the Las Vegas Summer League.

After the 2013 NBA Summer League ended, Flynn left the NBA and never returned.

=== Orlandina (2014–2015) ===
In September 2013, Flynn joined the Sichuan Blue Whales of the Chinese Basketball Association. However, he left a month later due to injury.

On August 30, 2014, Flynn signed with Orlandina Basket of Italy for the 2014–15 season. On November 24, 2014, he parted ways with Orlandina, after playing only two games in Serie A before getting injured.

== National team career ==
Flynn was named as a 2006 USA Men's U18 National Team member on June 26, 2006, at the 2006 FIBA Americas U18 Championship for men in San Antonio, Texas. During the tournament, he averaged 8.5 points, 3.8 rebounds, a team-high 5.3 assists, and 1.8 steals per game.

Flynn would once again play on Team USA in the 2007 USA Basketball U19 World Championships. The team took home the silver medal, as Flynn averaged 9.6 points per game in the USA's nine games.

== NBA career statistics ==
Legend
GP	Games played	GS	Games started	MPG	Minutes per game
FG%	Field goal percentage	3P%	3-point field goal percentage	FT%	Free throw percentage
RPG	Rebounds per game	APG	Assists per game	SPG	Steals per game
BPG	Blocks per game	PPG	Points per game	**Bold**	Career high

=== Regular season ===
Year	Team	GP	GS	MPG	FG%	3P%	FT%	RPG	APG	SPG	BPG	PPG
2009–10	Minnesota	**81**	**81**	**28.9**	**.417**	**.358**	**.826**	**2.4**	**4.4**	**1.0**	.0	**13.5**
2010–11	Minnesota	53	8	18.5	.365	.310	.762	1.5	3.4	.6	**.1**	5.3
2011–12	Houston	11	0	12.3	.293	.222	.786	.7	2.5	.3	**.1**	3.4
2011–12	Portland	18	1	15.6	.378	.320	.720	1.7	3.8	.2	**.1**	5.2
Career		163	90	22.9	.400	.338	.809	1.9	3.9	.7	.0	9.2
