= Excel Christian School =

Private Christian school in Sparks, Nevada, United States

Location
- 850 Baring Blvd, 89434; Sparks, Nevada; United States

Information
- Type: Private Christian
- Motto: Excellence & Faith in Education
- Established: 2003
- Founder: Bonnie Krupa
- Principal: Melissa Molina
- Staff: 15
- Faculty: 41
- Enrollment: 231
- Colors: Red and black
- Nickname: Warriors
- Affiliations: ACSI
- Information: 775-356-9995
- Website: excelchristianschool.org

Excel Christian School is an accredited private pre-K through grade 12 Christian school in Sparks, Nevada, founded in 2003 as a non-profit organization. The school's teams are known as the Warriors, and the school colors are red and black.

== Description ==
Excel Christian was founded as a non-denominational Christian school by teacher Bonnie Krupa, with a stated mission "for students to find joy in the pursuit of spiritual, moral, relational and academic excellence". Basic skills in "phonics, current events, mathematics, language skills plus reading and writing" were planned as the focus, with class electives to include "journalism, cinema, music, sports, art and cheerleading".

As of the 2017–2018 school year, Excel's K–12 enrollment was 231 students, with 63 students enrolled in grades 9–12.

Niche reviews rated Excel Christian as sixth among nine "Best Christian High Schools in Nevada", with an overall grade of "B" for academics. According the 2021 Niche survey, "After graduation, 75% of students from this school go on to attend a 4-year college."

It is a non-profit corporation, filing under 501(c)(3) of the U.S. tax code.

== History ==
Excel Christian School opened in August 2003 in leased classroom space on Baring Boulevard, large enough to serve between 50–80 students in grades K–12. It was located next to a YMCA which the school planned to use "for sports, recreation, PE programs and breaks".

In 2006, the school opened a second site, on Odie Boulevard, for its 75 middle school and high school students, with room enough to expand enrollment to 160 students. The site included a 560-seat auditorium planned for use with a new fine arts curriculum.

The elementary school program moved in 2008 to the Hope Chapel campus of University Family Fellowship, a larger location with 6,000 square feet of space, to allow expanding enrollment from 40 students in the elementary program up to 140 students. In the fall of 2008, the school also began the accreditation process of the Association of Christian Schools International, and as of 2021 it is accredited.

In March 2015, the school began fundraising for a down payment to buy the former YMCA property at Baring Boulevard and Rockwood Drive.

== Athletics ==
Excel is a member of the NIAA (Nevada Interscholastic Activities Association) and competes in the Single A (1A) division. Current sports offered for middle school are girls’ basketball, boys’ basketball, volleyball, football, track, and wrestling. High school sports offered include: boys’ basketball, girls’ basketball, cheerleading, cross country, football, track and field, volleyball, and wrestling.

In January 2020, five international students from the school filed a federal equal rights lawsuit against the Nevada Interscholastic Activities Association after the NIAA threatened to void any games the students had played in. The NIAA has a ban on international students playing in varsity sports, to prevent the trafficking of students for the benefit of sports teams. In February 2020, it was announced that Excel Christian School would be exempt from this ban due to its small size, although no other schools were affected.
