= Earl Barron =

American basketball player (born 1981)

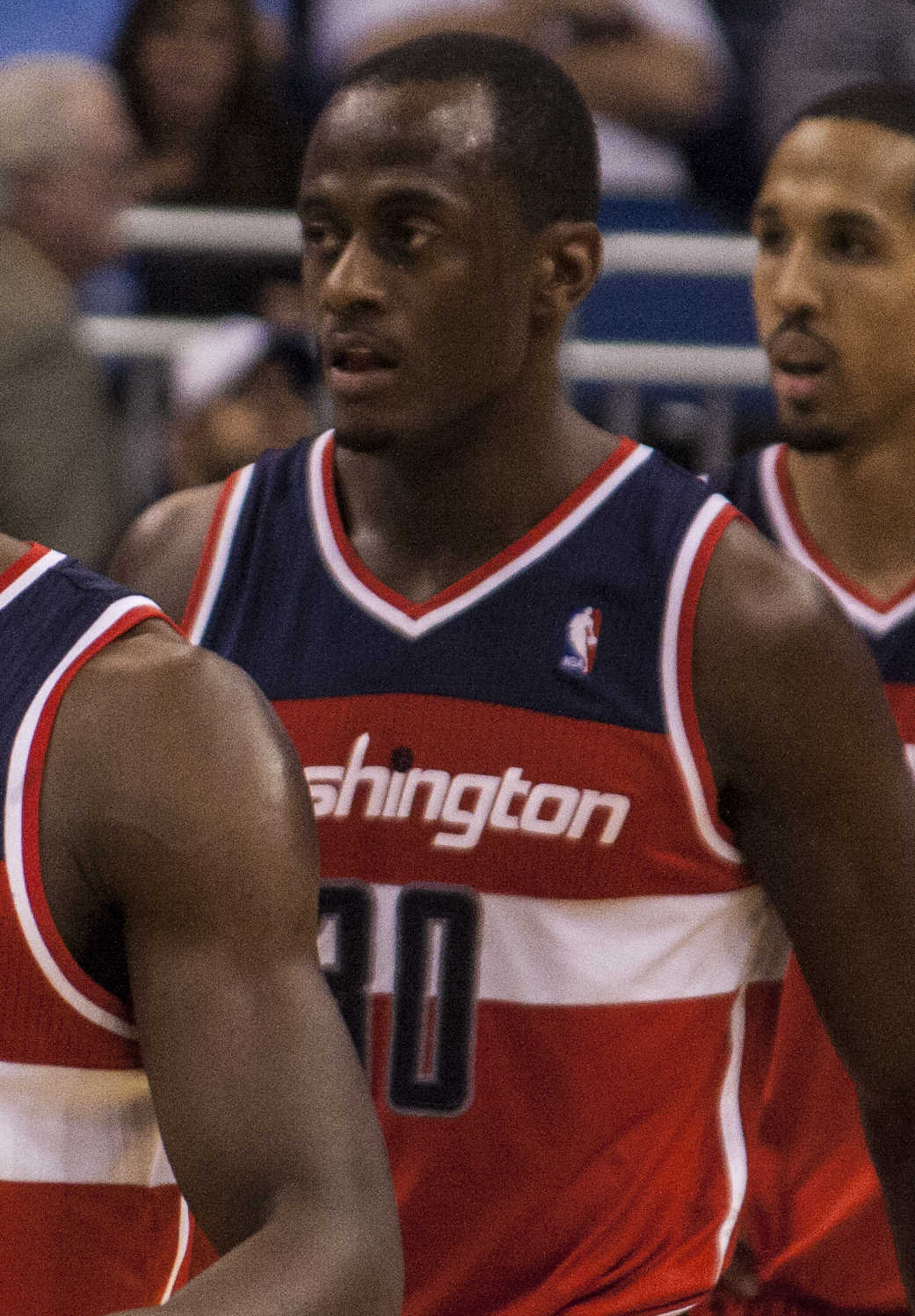
- Barron with the Washington Wizards in 2012

Personal information
- Born: August 14, 1981 (age 45) Clarksdale, Mississippi, U.S.
- Listed height: 7 ft 0 in (2.13 m)
- Listed weight: 250 lb (113 kg)

Career information
- High school: Clarksdale (Clarksdale, Mississippi)
- College: Memphis (1999–2003)
- NBA draft: 2003: undrafted
- Playing career: 2003–2017
- Position: Center / power forward
- Number: 30, 40, 42
- Coaching career: 2017–2018

Career history

Playing
- 2003–2004: Tuborg Pilsener
- 2004–2005: Huntsville Flight
- 2005: Red Bull Barako
- 2005–2008: Miami Heat
- 2006: →Florida Flame
- 2008: GMAC Bologna
- 2009: Los Angeles D-Fenders
- 2009–2010: Iowa Energy
- 2010: New York Knicks
- 2010: Phoenix Suns
- 2011: Milwaukee Bucks
- 2011: Portland Trail Blazers
- 2012: Golden State Warriors
- 2012: Meralco Bolts
- 2012: Atleticos de San Germán
- 2012: Washington Wizards
- 2013: New York Knicks
- 2014–2015: Bakersfield Jam
- 2015: Phoenix Suns
- 2015–2016: Fubon Braves
- 2016: Toyama Grouses
- 2017: Fubon Braves

Coaching
- 2017–2018: Northern Arizona Suns (assistant)

Career highlights
- SBL Best Foreign Player of the year (2016); All-NBA D-League First Team (2015); All-NBA D-League Third Team (2010); NBA D-League All-Star (2010)
- Stats at NBA.com
- Stats at Basketball Reference
Medals
Representing United States
Men's basketball
Summer Universiade
Bronze medal – third place	2001 Beijing	Team competition

Earl Daniel Barron Jr. (born August 14, 1981) is an American professional basketball former player and coach. He played college basketball for the University of Memphis and had stints in the NBA with multiple teams.

== College career ==
Barron played college basketball at the University of Memphis from 2000 to 2003 under coaches Johnny Jones and John Calipari. He averaged 7.8 points per game over his time at Memphis and started just under half (63) of his 128 career games.

In 2001–02, Barron's Tigers won the 2002 National Invitation Tournament and the regular season C-USA title. In Barron's senior year in 2002–03, the Tigers were ranked 19th nationally in the final AP poll and played in the 2003 NCAA tournament, losing to Arizona State University in the first round.

== Professional career ==
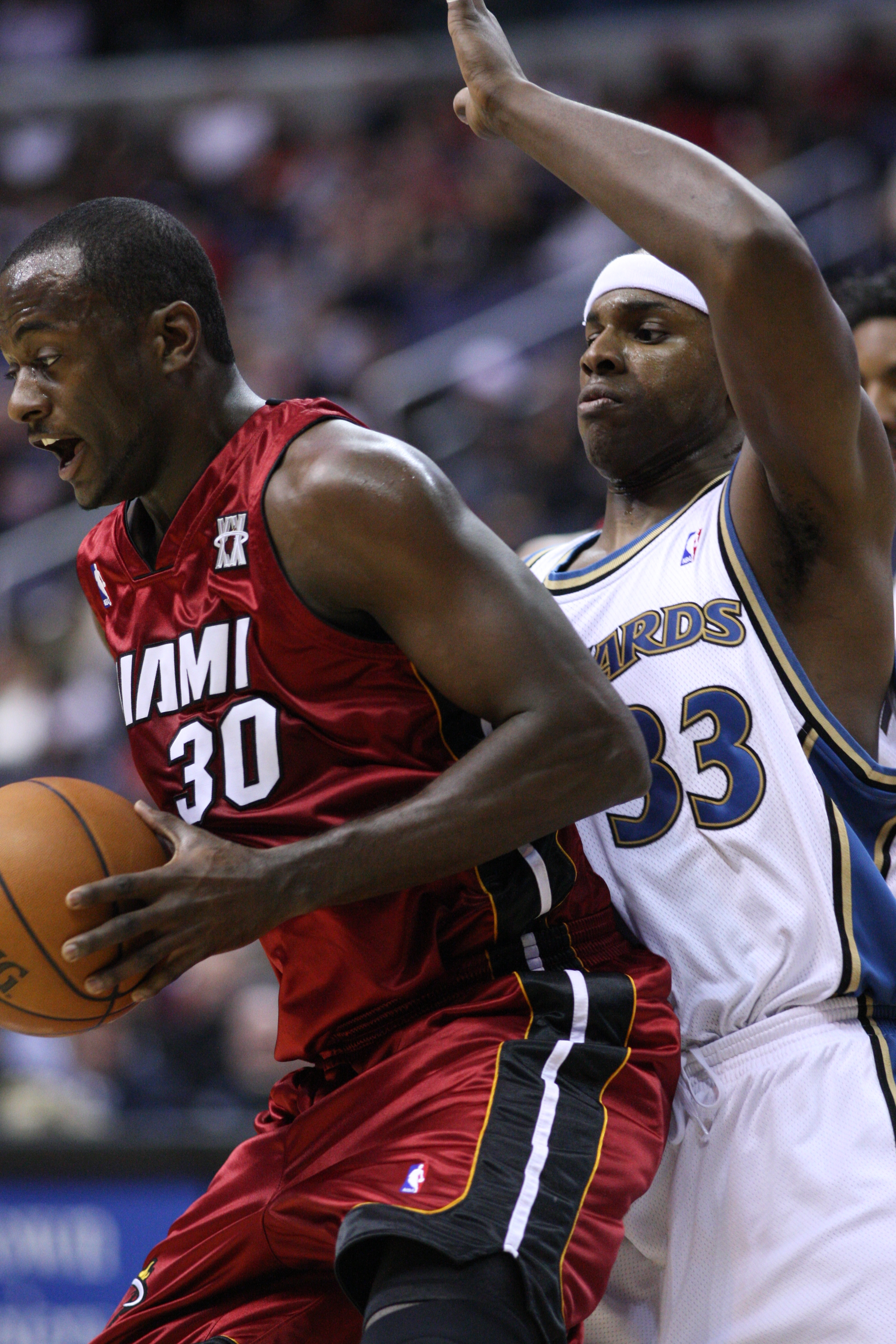
Barron gets guarded by Brendan Haywood during a 2007 game

A 7'0" center from the University of Memphis, he was never drafted by an NBA team. He began his professional career with the Turkish team Tuborg Pilsener in 2003 before joining the Huntsville Flight of the NBA Development League (D-League) in March 2004. He spent the 2004 pre-season with the Orlando Magic, but was waived before the regular season began. In 2005, he played with the Red Bull Barako in the Philippine Basketball Association (PBA).

He returned to the U.S. to play with the Miami Heat in the Summer League, signing on August 8. Barron played for the Heat for three seasons. After 82 games in Miami, which included a stint with the Florida Flame, Barron was not re-signed by the Heat. In August 2008, he signed a one-year, $2 million deal with the Italian team GMAC Bologna. His stint in Italy was cut short because of an ankle injury which forced him to leave the team in November 2008. In March 2009, he was signed by the Sioux Falls Skyforce and was immediately traded to the Los Angeles D-Fenders.

On September 28, 2009, Barron was signed by the New Orleans Hornets to their training camp roster, but failed to make the roster and was waived on October 21, 2009. He then returned to the D-League and was traded by the D-Fenders to the Iowa Energy in November 2009. He was selected to the 2010 D-League All-Star Game played during the 2010 NBA All-Star Weekend. He scored a game-high 20 points for the Eastern Conference in the 81–98 loss to the Western Conference.

On April 2, 2010, he was signed to a 10-day contract by the New York Knicks. On April 6, 2010, in his second game with the Knicks, he recorded a career high 18 rebounds against the Boston Celtics. His previous career high was eight. He also scored 17 points in the game for the first double-double of his NBA career. Five days later, he recorded his second double-double with 13 points and 12 rebounds in a game against his former team, the Heat. A day later, the Knicks signed him for the remainder of the season. He averaged 33 minutes per game in seven games with the Knicks, with a double-double average of points and rebounds per game (11.7 ppg and 11.0 rpg).

On November 16, 2010, he was signed by the Phoenix Suns, following an injury to their starting center Robin Lopez. Barron made his debut the next day against the Heat. On December 2, 2010, he made his first start as a Sun in a game against the Golden State Warriors. Barron was released by the Suns on December 21 and signed a ten-day contract with the Milwaukee Bucks on March 1, 2011. He then signed a second one with the Bucks, which ended on March 21. On April 12, the Portland Trail Blazers signed him to a contract for the rest of the 2011 season.

On December 21, 2011, he was waived by the Trail Blazers.

On January 14, 2012, he was signed by the Warriors. The Warriors waived him on February 6.

In February 2012, Barron signed with the Meralco Bolts in the Philippine Basketball Association (PBA) replacing the team's first import Jarrid Famous. On April 26, he signed with Atleticos de San Germán from Puerto Rico.

Barron joined the Washington Wizards in September 2012. He was waived by the Wizards on December 23, 2012.

On April 17, 2013, Barron signed with the New York Knicks following the retirement of Rasheed Wallace. He appeared in one game for the Knicks, scoring 11 points and grabbing 18 rebounds in 37 minutes in a victory against the Atlanta Hawks.

On September 26, 2014, Barron signed with the Phoenix Suns. However, he was later waived by the Suns on October 25, 2014. On November 2, 2014, he was acquired by the Bakersfield Jam as an affiliate player. On January 27, 2015, he was bought out of his contract with the Jam in order to sign in China with Shanxi Zhongyu. However, the CBA season finished before he appeared in a game for them, and he returned to the Jam on February 18. Three days later, he signed a 10-day contract with the Suns. He then signed a second 10-day contract with the Suns on March 3, and for the rest of the season on March 13.

On September 25, 2015, Barron signed with the Atlanta Hawks. However, he was later waived by the Hawks on October 24 after appearing in four preseason games. On November 17, 2015, he signed with the Fubon Braves of the Taiwanese League.

On September 3, 2016, Barron signed a one-year deal with the Toyama Grouses of the Japanese B.League. On December 9, 2016, he parted ways with Toyama. On January 9, 2017, he re-joined the Fubon Braves.

== Coaching career ==
=== Northern Arizona Suns (2017–2018) ===
On November 20, 2017, during the 2017–18 NBA G League season, Barron was announced as one of the newest assistant coaches for the Northern Arizona Suns, thus effectively ending his playing career.

=== Indiana Pacers (2020–2021) ===
On December 4, 2020, Barron was hired by the Indiana Pacers to serve as a video/player development assistant.

== Career statistics ==
Legend
GP	Games played	GS	Games started	MPG	Minutes per game
FG%	Field goal percentage	3P%	3-point field goal percentage	FT%	Free throw percentage
RPG	Rebounds per game	APG	Assists per game	SPG	Steals per game
BPG	Blocks per game	PPG	Points per game	**Bold**	Career high

=== NBA ===
==== Regular season ====
Year	Team	GP	GS	MPG	FG%	3P%	FT%	RPG	APG	SPG	BPG	PPG
2005–06	Miami	8	0	5.6	.313	.000	.750	1.3	.0	.0	.0	1.6
2006–07	Miami	28	0	7.3	.289	.000	.944	1.5	.2	.2	.1	2.3
2007–08	Miami	**46**	**15**	19.3	.404	.077	.701	4.3	.6	.4	.2	7.1
2009–10	New York	7	6	33.1	.441	.000	.759	11.0	1.1	**.6**	.6	**11.7**
2010–11	Phoenix	12	6	15.3	.235	.000	.600	3.3	.3	.5	.3	3.0
2010–11	Milwaukee	7	0	12.1	.459	.000	**1.000**	3.1	.6	.3	.3	5.1
2010–11	Portland	2	1	18.5	.273	.000	.500	7.0	1.5	.0	.0	3.5
2011–12	Golden State	2	0	4.5	**.500**	.000	.000	.5	.0	.0	.0	2.0
2012–13	Washington	11	1	11.1	.351	.000	.400	3.9	.3	.4	.4	2.5
2012–13	New York	1	1	**37.0**	.357	.000	.500	**18.0**	**2.0**	.0	**1.0**	11.0
2014–15	Phoenix	16	1	8.9	.308	**.500**	.500	1.8	.3	.2	.1	2.0
Career		140	31	14.2	.371	.167	.702	3.5	.5	.3	.2	4.6

==== Playoffs ====
Year	Team	GP	GS	MPG	FG%	3P%	FT%	RPG	APG	SPG	BPG	PPG
2011	Portland	1	0	.0	.000	.000	.000	.0	.0	.0	.0	.0

=== NBA D-League ===
==== Regular season ====
Year	Team	GP	GS	MPG	FG%	3P%	FT%	RPG	APG	SPG	BPG	PPG
2003–04	Huntsville	10	9	22.7	**.542**	–	.762	6.1	.6	**1.0**	.7	8.0
2004–05	Huntsville	45	23	25.8	.499	–	**.811**	5.7	.8	.4	.6	12.2
2005–06	Florida	6	3	29.2	.512	.000	.762	9.7	2.2	.7	.2	17.0
2008–09	Los Angeles	13	6	28.3	.415	.000	.636	7.2	**2.4**	.5	.7	9.9
2009–10	Iowa	**47**	**47**	31.7	.489	.318	.762	10.2	1.2	.7	**.8**	16.2
2014–15	Bakersfield	26	17	**32.5**	.467	**.338**	.792	**10.9**	1.5	.7	.5	**20.5**
Career		147	105	29.0	.483	.327	.775	8.4	1.2	.6	.6	14.7

==== Playoffs ====
Year	Team	GP	GS	MPG	FG%	3P%	FT%	RPG	APG	SPG	BPG	PPG
2004	Huntsville	**2**	**2**	12.0	**.500**	–	**1.000**	2.5	.5	3.5	1.5	4.0
2005	Huntsville	1	1	**27.0**	.222	–	**1.000**	**10.0**	**1.0**	**5.0**	**5.0**	**8.0**
Career		3	3	17.0	.333	–	1.000	5.0	.7	4.0	2.7	5.3

== Personal life ==
An avid poker player, Barron participated in the 2015 World Series of Poker where he was eliminated during the early stages of the competition.
