= Bob Ociepka =

American basketball coach

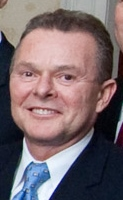
- Ociepka visits the White House in 2009 with the Chicago Bulls before the team's game against the Washington Wizards.

Personal information
- Born: 1948 or 1949 (age 77–78) Chicago, Illinois, U.S.

Career information
- High school: St. Mel (Chicago, Illinois)
- College: Quincy (1966–1970)
- Coaching career: 1970–2013

Career history

Coaching
- 1970–1979: Gordon Technical HS (asst.)
- 1979–1985: Gordon Technical HS
- 1985–1989: York HS
- 1989–1993: Indiana Pacers (asst.)
- 1993–1996: Los Angeles Clippers (asst.)
- 1996–1997: Philadelphia 76ers (asst.)
- 1998–1999: Detroit Pistons (asst.)
- 1999–2001: Cleveland Cavaliers (asst.)
- 2001–2003: Detroit Pistons (asst.)
- 2003–2006: Milwaukee Bucks (asst.)
- 2006–2008: Minnesota Timberwolves (asst.)
- 2008–2010: Chicago Bulls (asst.)
- 2010–2012: Portland Trail Blazers (asst.)
- 2012–2013: Los Angeles Clippers (asst.)

Robert Henry "Bob" Ociepka is an American former basketball coach.

== Early life ==
Ociepka was born in Chicago to an Italian American mother and Polish American father. Ociepka grew up in the West Side district of Chicago. After graduating from St. Mel High School, Ociepka played college basketball at Quincy University.

== High school coaching career ==
After graduating from Quincy University in 1970, Ociepka became an assistant coach for Gordon Technical High School in Chicago. After nine seasons as assistant, Ociepka became head coach in 1979. At Gordon Tech, Ociepka had a 128–43 record in six seasons and led Gordon to regional titles in his first four seasons and a spot in the state finals in his first season. From 1985 to 1989, Ociepka was head coach at York Community High School in Elmhurst. He was less successful at York, with a 27–50 record in his first three seasons. In 2000, he was inducted into the Chicago Catholic League Hall of Fame for his contribution to prep sports.

== NBA career ==
While coaching high school basketball, Ociepka served as a part-time volunteer scout for the Detroit Pistons in the 1980s.

He was first hired as an assistant coach in January 1989 for the Indiana Pacers. Ociepka has also served as an assistant coach with the Los Angeles Clippers from 1993 to 1996, the Philadelphia 76ers from 1996 to 1997, the Cleveland Cavaliers from 1999 to 2001, the Detroit Pistons from 1998 to 1999 and again from 2001 to 2003, the Milwaukee Bucks from 2003 to 2006, and the Minnesota Timberwolves from 2007 to 2008.

Ociepka also served as an advance scout during the 1998 season for the Orlando Magic.

From 2008 to 2010, Ociepka was an assistant coach for the Chicago Bulls and rookie head coach Vinny Del Negro. In 2010, following Del Negro's firing from the Bulls, Ociepka was hired as an assistant for the Portland Trail Blazers.

During his time in the NBA, Ociepka has also written two books on basketball strategies. Basketball Playbook: Plays From the Pros was published in 1995 and Basketball Playbook 2: More Plays from the Pros was published in 2001.

After serving as an assistant coach for the Los Angeles Clippers for the second time in his career, in the 2012–13 season, Ociepka retired from coaching.
