= WRKN =

WRKN may refer to:

- WRKN (FM), a radio station (106.1 FM) licensed to serve Picayune, Mississippi, United States
- WZRH, a radio station (92.3 FM) licensed to serve Laplace, Louisiana, United States, which held the call sign WRKN from 2010 to 2017
- WHWY, a radio station (98.1 FM) licensed to serve Holt, Florida, United States, which held the call sign WRKN from 2009 to 2010
- WTKE-FM, a radio station (100.3 FM) licensed to serve Niceville, Florida, which held the call sign WRKN from 2006 to 2009
- WNCV, a radio station (93.3 FM) licensed to serve Shalimar, Florida, which held the call sign WRKN in 2006
- WFQY, a radio station (970 AM) licensed to serve Brandon, Mississippi, which held the call sign WRKN from the 1960s to 2005
