= KKND =

KKND may refer to:

- KKND (FM), a radio station (106.7 FM) licensed to serve Port Sulphur, Louisiana, United States
- KMEZ (FM), a radio station (102.9 FM) licensed to serve Belle Chasse, Louisiana, United States, which held the call sign KKND from 2008 to 2018
- KFFN, a radio station (1490 AM) licensed to serve Tucson, Arizona, United States, which held the call sign KKND from 1995 to 1996
- KGFY, a radio station (105.5 FM) licensed to serve Stillwater, Oklahoma, United States, which held the call sign KKND from 1989 to 1993
- KKnD (video game)
