= KMEZ =

KMEZ may refer to:

- KMEZ (FM), a radio station (102.9 FM) licensed to serve Belle Chasse, Louisiana, United States
- KKND (FM), a radio station (106.7 FM) licensed to serve Port Sulphur, Louisiana, United States, which held the call sign KMEZ from 2008 to 2018
- KMVK, a radio station (107.5 FM) licensed to serve Fort Worth, Texas, United States, which held the call sign KMEZ-FM from 1988 to 1991
- KJKK, a radio station (100.3 FM) licensed to serve Dallas, Texas, United States, which held the call sign KMEZ from 1976 to 1988
- Mena Intermountain Municipal Airport (ICAO code KMEZ)
