= Alt 92.3 =

Alt 92.3 can refer to the following radio stations in the United States:

- WZRH, an alternative station from LaPlace, Louisiana
- WNYL, a former alternative station from New York City, now WINS-FM
