= 2010–11 New Orleans Hornets season =

- Head coach: Monty Williams
- General manager: Dell Demps
- Owners: NBA
- Arena: New Orleans Arena

Results
- Record: 46–36 (.561)
- Place: Division: 3rd (Southwest); Conference: 7th (Western)
- Playoff finish: First Round (lost to Lakers 2–4)
- Stats at Basketball Reference

Local media
- Television: Cox Sports Television
- Radio: KMEZ

The 2010–11 New Orleans Hornets season was the ninth (Note: At the time, this season was considered the 23rd season in franchise history, being viewed as a relocation from Charlotte. In 2014, after this team was rebranded as the Pelicans, the name and the statistical history of the original team was reclaimed by the present day Charlotte Hornets, who had begun play in 2004 as an expansion team known as the Charlotte Bobcats.) season of the franchise in the National Basketball Association (NBA).

The 2011 playoffs was the final time the New Orleans Hornets made the playoffs before changing the team's monicker to "Pelicans" in 2013. The Hornets fell to the back-to-back reigning champions the Los Angeles Lakers in six first-round games. The Lakers would go on to be swept by the eventual champions Dallas Mavericks in four Western Conference Semifinal games.

After six years, this season marked the end of the Chris Paul era as he was traded to the Los Angeles Clippers during the lockout after the season. Believed by many as the greatest Hornet/Pelican of all time, Paul was originally going to be traded to the Lakers in a 3-team deal that would send Lamar Odom, Goran Dragic, Luis Scola, Kevin Martin, and a 2012 first round draft pick to the Hornets and Pau Gasol to the Houston Rockets, but NBA Commissioner David Stern had controversially vetoed the trade.

== Key dates ==
- June 7 – The Hornets hired Portland Trail Blazers assistant coach Monty Williams to head coach.
- June 24 – The 2010 NBA draft was held in New York City.
- July 1 – The free agency period begun.
- July 13 – The Hornets and GM Jeff Bower mutually parted ways.
- July 22 – The Hornets hired San Antonio Spurs Vice President of Basketball Operations Dell Demps to GM.
- August 11 – The Hornets hired Washington Wizards Player Personnel Director Tim Connelly to Assistant GM.
- August 11 – The Hornets hired Houston Rockets Director of Scouting Gerald Madkins to Vice President of Player Personnel.

== Draft picks ==
Round	Pick	Player	Position	Nationality	College/Team
1	10	Cole Aldrich	C	United States	Kansas

The Hornets entered the draft with one first-round pick. They have traded their second-round pick to the Miami Heat in 2009.

== Roster ==
2010–11 New Orleans Hornets roster
Players

Pos.	No.	Player	Height	Weight	DOB	From
PF	11	David Andersen	6 ft 11 in (2.11 m)	245 lb (111 kg)	1980-06-23	Australia
SF	1	Trevor Ariza	6 ft 8 in (2.03 m)	210 lb (95 kg)	1985-06-30	UCLA
SG	8	Marco Belinelli	6 ft 5 in (1.96 m)	195 lb (88 kg)	1986-03-25	Italy
C	34	Aaron Gray	7 ft 0 in (2.13 m)	270 lb (122 kg)	1984-12-07	Pittsburgh
SG	33	Willie Green	6 ft 4 in (1.93 m)	200 lb (91 kg)	1981-07-28	Detroit Mercy
SF	22	Patrick Ewing Jr.	6 ft 8 in (2.03 m)	235 lb (107 kg)	1984-05-20	Indiana
SG	2	Jarrett Jack	6 ft 3 in (1.91 m)	197 lb (89 kg)	1983-10-28	Georgia Tech
PF	24	Carl Landry	6 ft 9 in (2.06 m)	248 lb (112 kg)	1983-09-19	Purdue
C	28	D. J. Mbenga	7 ft 0 in (2.13 m)	245 lb (111 kg)	1980-12-30	Democratic Republic of the Congo
C	50	Emeka Okafor	6 ft 10 in (2.08 m)	255 lb (116 kg)	1982-09-28	Connecticut
PG	3	Chris Paul	6 ft 0 in (1.83 m)	175 lb (79 kg)	1985-05-06	Wake Forest
SF	20	Quincy Pondexter	6 ft 7 in (2.01 m)	220 lb (100 kg)	1988-03-10	Washington
C	14	Jason Smith	7 ft 0 in (2.13 m)	240 lb (109 kg)	1986-03-02	Colorado State
PF	30	David West	6 ft 9 in (2.06 m)	250 lb (113 kg)	1980-08-29	Xavier

Coaches
Head coach
- Monty Williams
Assistant(s)
- Randy Ayers
- James Borrego
- Bryan Gates
- Fred Vinson
- Dave Hanners
- Michael Malone
- Jon Ishop (trainer)

Legend
- (DP) Unsigned draft pick
- (FA) Free agent
- (S) Suspended
- (DL) On assignment to D-League affiliate
- Injured

Roster
Updated: March 26, 2011

=== 2010–11 Salaries ===
As of September 2010:

Player	2010–11 Salary
Chris Paul	$14,940,152
Emeka Okafor	$11,540,375
David West (basketball)	$8,287,500
Trevor Ariza	$6,322,320
Willie Green	$3,976,000
Marco Belinelli	$2,380,270
Jason Smith	$2,187,913
Quincy Pondexter	$1,073,280
Aaron Gray	$1,062,144
Marcus Thornton	$762,195
TOTAL	$67,829,156

== Pre-season ==
=== Game log ===
2010 pre-season game log
Pre-season: 1–7 (home: 1–2; road: 0–5)

Game	Date	Team	Score	High points	High rebounds	High assists	Location Attendance	Record
1	October 9	Memphis	L 90–97	Trevor Ariza (17)	Emeka Okafor (9)	Chris Paul, Marco Belinelli, David West (4)	New Orleans Arena; 11,461	0–1
2	October 10	@ Orlando	L 81–135	Peja Stojaković (20)	Emeka Okafor (8)	Chris Paul (10)	Amway Center; 18,516	0–2
3	October 13	Miami	W 90–76	Marco Belinelli (19)	Jason Smith (8)	Chris Paul (7)	New Orleans Arena; 12,043	1–2
4	October 15	@ Indiana	L 98–101	Marco Belinelli (16)	Jason Smith (9)	Chris Paul (8)	Conseco Fieldhouse; 10,758	1–3
5	October 16	Atlanta	L 74–84	Marco Belinelli (13)	Pops Mensah-Bonsu (9)	Chris Paul (4)	Mountain States Health Alliance Athletic Center; 5,933	1–4
6	October 18	@ Memphis	L 91–96	Pops Mensah-Bonsu (19)	Pops Mensah-Bonsu (10)	Chris Paul (12)	FedExForum; 8,268	1–5
7	October 20	@ Charlotte	L 98–105	Marco Belinelli (25)	Chris Paul (6)	Chris Paul (14)	Time Warner Cable Arena; 19,077	1–6
8	October 21	@ Oklahoma City	L 86–101	David West (24)	D. J. Mbenga, Marcus Thornton, Jason Smith (6)	Willie Green (6)	Oklahoma City Arena; 16,541	1–7

2010–11 season schedule

== Regular season ==
=== Standings ===
Southwest Division	W	L	PCT	GB	Home	Road	Div
c-San Antonio Spurs	61	21	.744	–	36–5	25–16	10–6
x-Dallas Mavericks	57	25	.695	4	29–12	28–13	8–8
x-New Orleans Hornets	46	36	.561	15	28–13	18–23	9–7
x-Memphis Grizzlies	46	36	.561	15	30–11	16–25	8–8
Houston Rockets	43	39	.524	18	25–16	18–23	5–11

#	Western Conference				
#	Team	W	L	PCT	GB
1	c-San Antonio Spurs	61	21	.744	–
2	y-Los Angeles Lakers	57	25	.695	4
3	x-Dallas Mavericks	57	25	.695	4
4	y-Oklahoma City Thunder	55	27	.671	6
5	x-Denver Nuggets	50	32	.610	11
6	x-Portland Trail Blazers	48	34	.585	13
7	x-New Orleans Hornets	46	36	.561	15
8	x-Memphis Grizzlies	46	36	.561	15
9	Houston Rockets	43	39	.524	18
10	Phoenix Suns	40	42	.488	21
11	Utah Jazz	39	43	.476	22
12	Golden State Warriors	36	46	.439	25
13	Los Angeles Clippers	32	50	.390	29
14	Sacramento Kings	24	58	.293	37
15	Minnesota Timberwolves	17	65	.207	44

=== Game log ===
2010–11 game log
Total: 46–36 (home: 28–13; road: 18–23)
October: 3–0 (home: 2–0; road: 1–0)

Game	Date	Team	Score	High points	High rebounds	High assists	Location Attendance	Record
1	October 27	Milwaukee	W 95–91	David West (22)	Emeka Okafor (9)	Chris Paul (16)	New Orleans Arena; 15,039	1–0
2	October 29	Denver	W 101–95	Chris Paul (18)	Emeka Okafor (8)	Chris Paul (7)	New Orleans Arena; 12,474	2–0
3	October 30	@ San Antonio	W 99–90	Chris Paul (25)	Chris Paul, Marcus Thornton (7)	Chris Paul (5)	AT&T Center; 18,581	3–0

November: 9–5 (home: 5–1; road: 4–4)

Game	Date	Team	Score	High points	High rebounds	High assists	Location Attendance	Record
4	November 3	@ Houston	W 107–99	Chris Paul (25)	Emeka Okafor, David West, Jason Smith (9)	Chris Paul (8)	Toyota Center; 13,484	4–0
5	November 5	Miami	W 96–93	Emeka Okafor (26)	Emeka Okafor (13)	Chris Paul (19)	New Orleans Arena; 17,988	5–0
6	November 6	@ Milwaukee	W 87–81	David West (25)	Chris Paul (9)	Chris Paul (6)	Bradley Center; 16,731	6–0
7	November 9	L.A. Clippers	W 101–82	Willie Green (19)	Emeka Okafor (7)	Jerryd Bayless (9)	New Orleans Arena; 12,479	7–0
8	November 13	Portland	W 107–87	Marco Belinelli, David West (18)	Emeka Okafor (12)	Chris Paul (13)	New Orleans Arena; 14,706	8–0
9	November 15	@ Dallas	L 95–98	Chris Paul (22)	Emeka Okafor (14)	Chris Paul (9)	American Airlines Center; 19,712	8–1
10	November 17	Dallas	W 99–97	Chris Paul (20)	Emeka Okafor (10)	Chris Paul (11)	New Orleans Arena; 13,828	9–1
11	November 19	Cleveland	W 108–101	David West (34)	David West (11)	Chris Paul (10)	New Orleans Arena; 14,755	10–1
12	November 21	@ Sacramento	W 75–71	David West (17)	Emeka Okafor (12)	Chris Paul (14)	ARCO Arena; 12,003	11–1
13	November 22	@ L.A. Clippers	L 95–99	David West (30)	Emeka Okafor (12)	Chris Paul (6)	Staples Center; 17,787	11–2
14	November 24	@ Utah	L 87–105	Chris Paul (17)	Emeka Okafor (10)	Chris Paul (9)	EnergySolutions Arena; 19,237	11–3
15	November 26	@ Portland	W 97–78	Willie Green (19)	Emeka Okafor (9)	Chris Paul (13)	Rose Garden; 20,452	12–3
16	November 28	San Antonio	L 95–109	David West (23)	Emeka Okafor, David West (7)	Chris Paul (7)	New Orleans Arena; 12,449	12–4
17	November 29	@ Oklahoma City	L 89–95	David West (20)	Emeka Okafor (11)	Chris Paul (14)	Oklahoma City Arena; 18,203	12–5

December: 7–9 (home: 6–3; road: 1–6)

Game	Date	Team	Score	High points	High rebounds	High assists	Location Attendance	Record
18	December 1	Charlotte	W 89–73	David West (22)	Emeka Okafor (13)	Chris Paul (14)	New Orleans Arena; 10,866	13–5
19	December 3	New York	L 92–100	Trevor Ariza (21)	Emeka Okafor (14)	Chris Paul (10)	New Orleans Arena; 14,020	13–6
20	December 5	@ San Antonio	L 84–109	Chris Paul (16)	Chris Paul, Jason Smith, David West (5)	Chris Paul (8)	AT&T Center; 17,571	13–7
21	December 8	Detroit	W 93–74	David West (25)	Trevor Ariza, Jason Smith (7)	Chris Paul (14)	New Orleans Arena; 10,823	14–7
22	December 10	Oklahoma City	L 92–97	David West (24)	David West (13)	Chris Paul (7)	New Orleans Arena; 14,428	14–8
23	December 12	@ Philadelphia	L 70–88	Chris Paul (25)	Trevor Ariza (10)	Chris Paul (3)	Wells Fargo Center; 13,884	14–9
24	December 13	@ Miami	L 84–96	David West (26)	David West (12)	Chris Paul (5)	American Airlines Arena; 19,600	14–10
25	December 15	Sacramento	W 94–91	Chris Paul (22)	Emeka Okafor, David West (9)	Chris Paul (11)	New Orleans Arena; 13,325	15–10
26	December 17	Utah	W 100–71	David West (23)	Emeka Okafor (11)	Chris Paul (10)	New Orleans Arena; 14,414	16–10
27	December 19	@ Detroit	L 108–111 (OT)	David West (32)	Emeka Okafor (12)	Chris Paul (10)	The Palace of Auburn Hills; 16,452	16–11
28	December 20	@ Indiana	L 93–94	Emeka Okafor (19)	Emeka Okafor (15)	Jarrett Jack (6)	Conseco Fieldhouse; 12,271	16–12
29	December 22	New Jersey	W 105–91	Emeka Okafor (21)	Emeka Okafor (10)	Chris Paul (14)	New Orleans Arena; 15,423	17–12
30	December 26	Atlanta	W 93–86	Chris Paul (22)	Emeka Okafor (15)	Chris Paul (8)	New Orleans Arena; 15,626	18–12
31	December 27	@ Minnesota	L 98–113	David West (23)	Emeka Okafor (8)	Chris Paul (13)	Target Center; 11,679	18–13
32	December 29	L.A. Lakers	L 88–103	Chris Paul (20)	Emeka Okafor (7)	Chris Paul (7)	New Orleans Arena; 18,018	18–14
33	December 31	@ Boston	W 83–81	Chris Paul (20)	Emeka Okafor (13)	Chris Paul (11)	TD Garden; 18,624	19–14

January: 12–4 (home: 6–1; road: 6–3)

Game	Date	Team	Score	High points	High rebounds	High assists	Location Attendance	Record
34	January 1	@ Washington	W 92–81	Trevor Ariza (22)	Emeka Okafor (15)	Chris Paul (11)	Verizon Center; 16,026	20–14
35	January 3	Philadelphia	W 84–77	David West (17)	Emeka Okafor, David West (8)	Chris Paul (5)	New Orleans Arena; 13,433	21–14
36	January 5	Golden State	L 103–110	Chris Paul (24)	Trevor Ariza, Emeka Okafor (10)	Chris Paul (13)	New Orleans Arena; 13,532	21–15
37	January 7	@ L.A. Lakers	L 97–101	David West (23)	Emeka Okafor (13)	Chris Paul (10)	Staples Center; 18,997	21–16
38	January 9	@ Denver	W 96–87	Chris Paul (20)	Emeka Okafor (13)	Chris Paul (6)	Pepsi Center; 16,283	22–16
39	January 12	Orlando	W 92–89 (OT)	Marcus Thornton (22)	Emeka Okafor (14)	Chris Paul (13)	New Orleans Arena; 13,688	23–16
40	January 14	@ Houston	W 110–105 (OT)	David West (29)	Emeka Okafor (15)	Chris Paul (8)	Toyota Center; 13,616	24–16
41	January 15	@ Charlotte	W 88–81	David West (26)	Emeka Okafor (10)	Trevor Ariza, Chris Paul (4)	Time Warner Cable Arena; 17,486	25–16
42	January 17	Toronto	W 85–81	David West (23)	Emeka Okafor (16)	Chris Paul (11)	New Orleans Arena; 15,155	26–16
43	January 19	Memphis	W 103–102 (OT)	Chris Paul (20)	Emeka Okafor, David West (11)	Chris Paul (12)	New Orleans Arena; 15,951	27–16
44	January 21	@ Atlanta	W 100–59	Chris Paul (16)	Emeka Okafor (12)	Chris Paul (8)	Philips Arena; 14,875	28–16
45	January 22	San Antonio	W 96–72	Marcus Thornton, David West (18)	Emeka Okafor (12)	Chris Paul (6)	New Orleans Arena; 18,023	29–16
46	January 24	Oklahoma City	W 91–89	Chris Paul (24)	Emeka Okafor (9)	Chris Paul (9)	New Orleans Arena; 17,233	30–16
47	January 26	@ Golden State	W 112–103	David West (22)	Trevor Ariza, Emeka Okafor (7)	Chris Paul (17)	Oracle Arena; 18,108	31–16
48	January 29	@ Sacramento	L 96–102	David West (21)	David West (7)	Chris Paul (7)	ARCO Arena; 14,534	31–17
49	January 30	@ Phoenix	L 102–104	Chris Paul (26)	Marcus Thornton (10)	Chris Paul (12)	US Airways Center; 17,921	31–18

February: 4–8 (home: 2–4; road: 2–4)

Game	Date	Team	Score	High points	High rebounds	High assists	Location Attendance	Record
50	February 1	Washington	W 97–89	Jason Smith (20)	Aaron Gray, David West (8)	Chris Paul (9)	New Orleans Arena; 13,921	32–18
51	February 2	@ Oklahoma City	L 93–104	David West (20)	David West (15)	Chris Paul (5)	Oklahoma City Arena; 17,849	32–19
52	February 5	L.A. Lakers	L 95–101	Chris Paul (21)	David West (12)	Chris Paul (15)	New Orleans Arena; 18,426	32–20
53	February 7	Minnesota	L 92–104	David West (18)	Aaron Gray (8)	Chris Paul (13)	New Orleans Arena; 13,401	32–21
54	February 9	@ New Jersey	L 101–103 (OT)	David West (32)	David West (15)	Chris Paul (11)	Prudential Center; 13,316	32–22
55	February 11	@ Orlando	W 99–93	Willie Green (24)	David West (17)	Chris Paul (7)	Amway Center; 18,944	33–22
56	February 12	Chicago	L 88–97	Marcus Thornton (24)	Aaron Gray, Marcus Thornton (6)	Chris Paul (6)	New Orleans Arena; 17,831	33–23
57	February 15	@ Golden State	L 89–102	Marco Belinelli, David West (15)	David West (7)	Chris Paul (10)	Oracle Arena; 18,276	33–24
58	February 16	@ Portland	L 96–103	David West (27)	Trevor Ariza (9)	Trevor Ariza (6)	Rose Garden; 20,650	33–25
All-Star Break
59	February 23	L.A. Clippers	W 98–87	David West (22)	David West (8)	Chris Paul (10)	New Orleans Arena; 17,537	34–25
60	February 25	@ Minnesota	W 95–81	Trevor Ariza (18)	Emeka Okafor (7)	Chris Paul (8)	Target Center; 16,965	35–25
61	February 27	Houston	L 89–91	David West (22)	Emeka Okafor (14)	Chris Paul (12)	New Orleans Arena; 17,466	35–26

March: 7–6 (home: 3–2; road: 4–4)

Game	Date	Team	Score	High points	High rebounds	High assists	Location Attendance	Record
62	March 1	@ Toronto	L 90–96	David West (19)	David West (10)	Chris Paul (5)	Air Canada Centre; 14,704	35–27
63	March 2	@ New York	L 88–107	Jarrett Jack (21)	Emeka Okafor (8)	Chris Paul (10)	Madison Square Garden; 19,763	35–28
64	March 4	@ Memphis	W 98–91	Chris Paul (23)	Carl Landry (10)	Chris Paul (14)	FedExForum; 15,367	36–28
65	March 6	@ Cleveland	W 96–81	David West (23)	Emeka Okafor, David West (7)	Chris Paul (11)	Quicken Loans Arena; 18,754	37–28
66	March 7	@ Chicago	L 77–85	Jarrett Jack (23)	David West (11)	Jarrett Jack, David West (3)	United Center; 21,997	37–29
67	March 9	Dallas	W 93–92	Marco Belinelli, Jarrett Jack (21)	David West (10)	Jarrett Jack (7)	New Orleans Arena; 14,472	38–29
68	March 12	Sacramento	W 115–103	Chris Paul (33)	David West (9)	Chris Paul (15)	New Orleans Arena; 15,530	39–29
69	March 14	Denver	L 103–114	Chris Paul (27)	Emeka Okafor (7)	Chris Paul (10)	New Orleans Arena; 11,782	39–30
70	March 16	Phoenix	W 100–95	Chris Paul (26)	Emeka Okafor (11)	Chris Paul (9)	New Orleans Arena; 13,758	40–30
71	March 19	Boston	L 85–89	David West (32)	Emeka Okafor (11)	Chris Paul (15)	New Orleans Arena; 18,018	40–31
72	March 24	@ Utah	W 121–117 (OT)	David West (29)	Trevor Ariza (9)	Chris Paul (12)	EnergySolutions Arena; 18,840	41–31
73	March 25	@ Phoenix	W 106–100	Chris Paul (22)	Emeka Okafor (12)	Chris Paul (7)	US Airways Center; 18,422	42–31
74	March 27	@ L.A. Lakers	L 84–102	Carl Landry (24)	Emeka Okafor (11)	Chris Paul (9)	Staples Center; 18,997	42–32
75	March 30	Portland	W 95–91	Carl Landry (21)	Emeka Okafor (10)	Chris Paul (12)	New Orleans Arena; 12,575	43–32

April: 3–4 (home: 3–2; road: 0–2)

Game	Date	Team	Score	High points	High rebounds	High assists	Location Attendance	Record
76	April 1	Memphis	L 81–93	Carl Landry (19)	Emeka Okafor (10)	Chris Paul (13)	New Orleans Arena; 16,561	43–33
77	April 3	Indiana	W 108–96	Trevor Ariza (19)	Emeka Okafor (17)	Chris Paul (8)	New Orleans Arena; 13,898	44–33
78	April 6	Houston	W 101–93	Chris Paul (28)	Carl Landry, Chris Paul (9)	Chris Paul (10)	New Orleans Arena; 12,728	45–33
79	April 8	Phoenix	W 109–97	Willie Green (31)	Trevor Ariza (8)	Chris Paul (12)	New Orleans Arena; 14,950	46–33
80	April 10	@ Memphis	L 89–111	Marco Belinelli (18)	Emeka Okafor (7)	Chris Paul (10)	FedExForum; 17,041	46–34
81	April 11	Utah	L 78–90	Chris Paul (15)	Aaron Gray (9)	Jarrett Jack (6)	New Orleans Arena; 12,558	46–35
82	April 13	@ Dallas	L 89–121	Jarrett Jack (21)	Aaron Gray (10)	Chris Paul (8)	American Airlines Center; 20,366	46–36

2010–11 season schedule

== Playoffs ==
=== Game log ===
2011 playoff game log
First Round: 2–4 (home: 1–2; road: 1–2)

Game	Date	Team	Score	High points	High rebounds	High assists	Location Attendance	Series
1	April 17	@ L.A. Lakers	W 109–100	Chris Paul (33)	Trevor Ariza, Chris Paul (7)	Chris Paul (14)	Staples Center; 18,997	1–0
2	April 20	@ L.A. Lakers	L 78–87	Trevor Ariza (22)	Aaron Gray (8)	Chris Paul (9)	Staples Center; 18,997	1–1
3	April 22	L.A. Lakers	L 86–100	Carl Landry (23)	Trevor Ariza (12)	Chris Paul (8)	New Orleans Arena; 18,340	1–2
4	April 24	L.A. Lakers	W 93–88	Chris Paul (27)	Chris Paul (13)	Chris Paul (15)	New Orleans Arena; 18,083	2–2
5	April 26	@ L.A. Lakers	L 90–106	Trevor Ariza (22)	Aaron Gray (6)	Chris Paul (12)	Staples Center; 18,997	2–3
6	April 28	L.A. Lakers	L 80–98	Carl Landry (19)	Chris Paul (8)	Chris Paul (11)	New Orleans Arena; 17,949	2–4

2011 playoff schedule

== Player statistics ==
Legend
GP	Games played	GS	Games started	MPG	Minutes per game
FG%	Field-goal percentage	3P%	3-point field-goal percentage	FT%	Free-throw percentage
RPG	Rebounds per game	APG	Assists per game	SPG	Steals per game
BPG	Blocks per game	PPG	Points per game

=== Regular season ===
Player	GP	GS	MPG	FG%	3P%	FT%	RPG	APG	SPG	BPG	PPG
David Andersen	29	0	7.7	.446	.385	.467	1.7	.2	.1	.2	2.7
Trevor Ariza	75	75	34.7	.398	.303	.701	5.4	2.2	1.6	.4	11.0
Jerryd Bayless	11	0	13.5	.347	.214	.765	1.4	2.5	.2	.1	4.5
Marco Belinelli	80	69	24.5	.437	.414	.784	1.9	1.2	.5	.1	10.5
Patrick Ewing Jr.	7	0	2.7	.000	.000	.750	.3	.3	.0	.1	.4
Aaron Gray	41	6	13.0	.566	.	.500	4.2	.4	.3	.3	3.1
Willie Green	77	13	21.7	.443	.348	.780	2.1	1.0	.5	.2	8.7
D. J. Mbenga	41	0	8.0	.469	.	.722	2.1	.1	.1	.7	1.4
Jarrett Jack	70	2	19.6	.412	.345	.845	1.9	2.6	.6	.1	8.5
Carl Landry	23	10	26.2	.527	.000	.795	4.1	.6	.4	.5	11.8
Pops Mensah-Bonsu	7	0	5.0	.333	.	.	1.6	.3	.0	.0	.3
Emeka Okafor	72	72	31.8	.573	.000	.562	9.5	.6	.6	1.8	10.3
Chris Paul	80	80	36.0	.463	.388	.878	4.1	9.8	2.4	.1	15.8
Sasha Pavlovic	4	1	12.5	.182	.000	.	1.5	1.5	.0	1.0	1.0
Quincy Pondexter	66	6	11.1	.406	.360	.706	1.3	.4	.3	.2	2.8
Jason Smith	77	6	14.3	.443	.000	.843	3.1	.5	.3	.4	4.3
Peja Stojakovic	6	0	14.8	.424	.440	.857	1.0	1.0	.3	.0	7.5
Marcus Thornton	46	0	16.2	.410	.376	.758	2.8	.9	.4	.1	7.8
David West	70	70	35.0	.508	.222	.807	7.6	2.3	1.0	.9	18.9

=== Playoffs ===
Player	GP	GS	MPG	FG%	3P%	FT%	RPG	APG	SPG	BPG	PPG
Trevor Ariza	6	6	40.2	.412	.333	.727	6.5	3.3	1.3	.5	15.5
Marco Belinelli	6	6	28.8	.365	.308	1.000	.8	.7	.8	.0	9.7
Patrick Ewing Jr.	2	0	1.0	1.000	1.000	.	.0	.0	.0	.0	1.5
Aaron Gray	6	0	14.5	.692	.	.375	3.5	.3	.3	.3	3.5
Willie Green	6	0	14.0	.389	.222	.571	.8	.7	.3	.0	5.7
D. J. Mbenga	5	0	5.2	1.000	.	.500	1.0	.2	.4	.6	1.0
Jarrett Jack	6	0	18.5	.353	.000	.688	2.5	2.2	.2	.2	5.8
Carl Landry	6	6	35.5	.456	.	.917	5.0	1.0	.7	.5	15.8
Emeka Okafor	6	6	31.3	.645	.	.364	5.5	.0	1.0	1.0	7.3
Chris Paul	6	6	41.7	.545	.474	.796	6.7	11.5	1.8	.0	22.0
Quincy Pondexter	3	0	3.0	.167	.000	.	.3	.3	.0	.0	.7
Jason Smith	6	0	9.7	.467	.	.	1.2	.2	.3	.0	2.3

== Awards, records and milestones ==
=== Awards ===
==== All-Star ====
Chris Paul was selected as a starter to his 4th NBA All Star game

== Transactions ==
=== Trades ===
July 8, 2010

To Oklahoma City Thunder

- (United States) Morris Peterson
  No. 11 pick (Cole Aldrich)
To New Orleans Hornets

- No. 21 pick (Craig Brackins)
  No. 26 pick (Quincy Pondexter)

August 11, 2010

To Indiana Pacers

- (United States) Darren Collison
  (United States) James Posey
To New Orleans Hornets

- (United States) Trevor Ariza

August 11, 2010

To Toronto Raptors

- (United States) Julian Wright
To New Orleans Hornets

- (Italy) Marco Belinelli

September 23, 2010

To Philadelphia 76ers

- (United States) Craig Brackins
  (Lithuania) Darius Songaila
To New Orleans Hornets

- (United States) Willie Green
  (United States) Jason Smith

October 23, 2010

To Portland Trail Blazers

- (United States) Sean Marks
To New Orleans Hornets

- (United States) Jerryd Bayless

November 20, 2010

February 23, 2011

To Toronto Raptors

- (Serbia) Peja Stojaković
- (United States) Jerryd Bayless
To Sacramento Kings

- (United States) Marcus Thornton
- Cash considerations
To New Orleans Hornets

- (United States) Jarrett Jack
- (Australia) David Andersen
- (United States) Marcus Banks
To New Orleans Hornets

- (United States) Carl Landry

=== Free agents ===
==== Additions ====
Player	Signed	Former Team
Aaron Gray	2 Year Contract	New Orleans Hornets
Sasha Pavlović	10-day contract	Dallas Mavericks
Jerel McNeal	10-day contract	Rio Grande Valley Vipers
Patrick Ewing Jr.	10-day contract	Sioux Falls Skyforce

==== Subtractions ====
Player	Reason Left	New Team
Joe Alexander	Waived	Texas Legends
Pops Mensah-Bonsu	Waived	ASVEL Villeurbanne
Sasha Pavlović	10-day contract expired	Boston Celtics
Jerel McNeal	10-day contract expired	
