= Darrell Arthur =

American basketball player (born 1988)

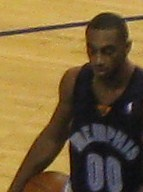
- Arthur with the Memphis Grizzlies in 2008

Personal information
- Born: March 25, 1988 (age 38) Dallas, Texas, U.S.
- Listed height: 6 ft 9 in (2.06 m)
- Listed weight: 235 lb (107 kg)

Career information
- High school: South Oak Cliff (Dallas, Texas)
- College: Kansas (2006–2008)
- NBA draft: 2008: 1st round, 27th overall pick
- Drafted by: New Orleans Hornets
- Playing career: 2008–2018
- Position: Power forward
- Number: 00

Career history
- 2008–2013: Memphis Grizzlies
- 2013–2018: Denver Nuggets

Career highlights
- NCAA champion (2008); First-team All-Big 12 (2008); Big 12 All-Rookie Team (2007); McDonald's All-American (2006); Third-team Parade All-American (2006); Co-Texas Mr. Basketball (2006)
- Stats at NBA.com
- Stats at Basketball Reference

Darrell Antwonne Arthur (born March 25, 1988) is an American former professional basketball player. He played college basketball for the Kansas Jayhawks for two seasons, and was part of their 2007–08 national championship team. He was drafted by the New Orleans Hornets in the 2008 NBA draft but after two trades, he ended up with the Memphis Grizzlies, with whom he signed on July 8, 2008. He is listed at 6 feet 9 inches (2.06 m), 235 lb (107 kg) and played the power forward position.

Darrell is now a part of the Denver Nuggets Front Office.

Arthur is the first cousin of fellow basketball player Quinton Ross.

== Early life ==
In high school, Arthur guided South Oak Cliff High School to back-to-back Texas 4A state titles in 2005 and 2006 and was the tournament's MVP both years. Those state titles were later forfeited, after it was determined that the school had played an ineligible athlete.

During his senior year, Arthur was named a McDonald's All-American and third-team Parade All-American honors in 2006.

In regards to college recruiting, Arthur was considered a five-star recruit by Rivals.com, and 247Sports.com listed him as the consensus top recruit in Texas and the 13th best recruit in the country.

== College career ==
Arthur's uniform number in college was 00, making him the first Jayhawk to wear that number since Greg Ostertag. He was named to the Big 12 All-Rookie team in his freshman year in 2006–07. Arthur was named to the All-Big 12 first team the year Kansas won the NCAA championship.

== Professional career ==
=== Memphis Grizzlies (2008–2013) ===
Arthur was selected by the New Orleans Hornets as the 27th overall pick in the 2008 NBA draft but was promptly traded to the Portland Trail Blazers for cash. The Trail Blazers then traded Arthur to the Houston Rockets for draft rights to 25th overall pick Nicolas Batum. Soon afterwards, the Rockets traded Arthur to the Memphis Grizzlies for draft rights to the 28th overall pick Donté Greene.

On September 3, 2008, Arthur and fellow former Kansas Jayhawks teammate Mario Chalmers were excused from NBA's Rookie Training Camp following a marijuana-related incident. Police responding to their hotel room following a fire alarm at 2:00 a.m. claimed that the room smelled strongly of marijuana but none was found and no charges were filed. Fellow NBA rookie Michael Beasley was also reported to have been in the room at the time, but was not asked to leave camp. Beasley was fined $50,000 for his involvement in the incident. Arthur released a statement denying any involvement with marijuana. Arthur was fined $20,000 by the league for missing the rookie camp, but was not fined or suspended for any drug-related violations.

On June 29, 2012, the Grizzlies extended a qualifying offer to Arthur, making him a restricted free agent.

=== Denver Nuggets (2013–2018) ===
On June 27, 2013, Arthur was traded to the Denver Nuggets along with 55th overall draft pick Joffrey Lauvergne in exchange for Kosta Koufos. On June 23, 2014, he exercised his player option for the 2014–15 season.

On August 7, 2015, Arthur re-signed with the Nuggets. On March 31, 2016, he tied a career high with 24 points off the bench in a 101–95 loss to the New Orleans Pelicans.

On July 9, 2016, Arthur again re-signed with the Nuggets.

On July 13, 2018, Arthur was traded, along with Kenneth Faried, a protected 2019 first round draft pick and a 2020 second round draft pick, to the Brooklyn Nets in exchange for Isaiah Whitehead. Seven days later, Arthur was traded to the Phoenix Suns in exchange for Jared Dudley and a 2021 second round draft pick. On October 15, 2018, he was waived by the Suns.

== NBA career statistics ==
Legend
GP	Games played	GS	Games started	MPG	Minutes per game
FG%	Field goal percentage	3P%	3-point field goal percentage	FT%	Free throw percentage
RPG	Rebounds per game	APG	Assists per game	SPG	Steals per game
BPG	Blocks per game	PPG	Points per game	**Bold**	Career high

=== Regular season ===
Year	Team	GP	GS	MPG	FG%	3P%	FT%	RPG	APG	SPG	BPG	PPG
2008–09	Memphis	76	**64**	19.3	.438	.000	.667	**4.6**	.6	.7	.7	5.6
2009–10	Memphis	32	1	14.3	.432	.000	.567	3.4	.5	.4	.4	4.5
2010–11	Memphis	**80**	9	20.1	**.497**	.000	.813	4.3	.7	.7	**.8**	**9.1**
2012–13	Memphis	59	3	16.4	.451	.278	.717	2.9	.6	.4	.6	6.1
2013–14	Denver	68	1	17.1	.395	.375	.855	3.1	.9	.6	.7	5.9
2014–15	Denver	58	4	17.0	.404	.236	.780	2.9	1.0	**.8**	.4	6.6
2015–16	Denver	70	16	**21.7**	.452	.385	.755	4.2	**1.4**	**.8**	.7	7.5
2016–17	Denver	41	7	15.6	.442	**.453**	**.864**	2.7	1.0	.5	.5	6.4
2017–18	Denver	19	1	7.4	.468	.348	.667	.8	.5	.4	.2	2.8
Career		503	106	17.8	.444	.352	.765	3.5	.8	.6	.6	6.5

=== Playoffs ===
Year	Team	GP	GS	MPG	FG%	3P%	FT%	RPG	APG	SPG	BPG	PPG
2011	Memphis	13	0	**15.5**	.459	**1.000**	.765	2.2	**.5**	**.5**	**.9**	**7.1**
2013	Memphis	**15**	0	11.7	**.472**	.000	**.889**	**2.5**	.4	.1	.3	3.9
Career		28	0	13.4	.464	.333	.808	2.4	.5	.3	.6	5.4

== See also ==
- 2006 boys high school basketball All-Americans
