= 2010–11 Memphis Grizzlies season =

- Head coach: Lionel Hollins
- General manager: Chris Wallace
- Owners: Michael Heisley
- Arena: FedExForum

Results
- Record: 46–36 (.561)
- Place: Division: 4th (Southwest); Conference: 8th (Western)
- Playoff finish: Conference Semifinals (lost to Thunder 3–4)
- Stats at Basketball Reference

Local media
- Television: Fox Sports Tennessee, SportSouth
- Radio: WRBO

The 2010–11 Memphis Grizzlies season was the 16th season of the franchise in the National Basketball Association (NBA), and the tenth for the franchise in Memphis. The 2010–11 Memphis Grizzlies season marked their first playoff appearance since 2006. This season also marked their first playoff win in a series in franchise history by defeating the first seeded San Antonio Spurs in six games in an upset, becoming the fourth eighth seed in league history to win a playoffs series against a number one seed, following the Denver Nuggets in 1994, the New York Knicks in 1999, and the Golden State Warriors in 2007.

However, the Grizzlies' season ended with a seven-game loss to the Oklahoma City Thunder in the Semifinals.

== Key dates ==
- June 24, 2010 – The 2010 NBA draft was held in New York City.
- July 1, 2010 – The free agency period began.
- February 8, 2011 – Tony Allen was inserted into the starting lineup in a game against Oklahoma City, in place of an injured Rudy Gay and suspended O. J. Mayo. Allen produced 27 points, five steals and three blocks while spending most of the contest guarding Kevin Durant and in a postgame interview, coined the phrase "Grit. Grind." that became part of Memphis' team identity going forward.
- February 24, 2011 – The Grizzlies trade Hasheem Thabeet, DeMarre Carroll and a future first-round draft pick to the Houston Rockets for Shane Battier and Ishmael Smith. An attempted trade of O. J. Mayo to the Indiana Pacers for Josh McRoberts and a 2011 first-round draft pick did not make the trade deadline.
- April 8, 2011 – The Grizzlies clinch a playoff berth after a victory over the Sacramento Kings.

== Draft picks ==
Round	Pick	Player	Position	Nationality	School
1	12	Xavier Henry	Guard	United States	Kansas (Fr.)
1	25	Dominique Jones	Guard	United States	USF (Jr.)
1	28	Greivis Vásquez	Guard	Venezuela	Maryland (Sr.)

== Roster ==
2010–11 Memphis Grizzlies roster
Players

Pos.	No.	Player	Height	Weight	DOB	From
SG	9	Tony Allen	6 ft 4 in (1.93 m)	213 lb (97 kg)		Oklahoma State
F	00	Darrell Arthur	6 ft 9 in (2.06 m)	235 lb (107 kg)		Kansas
G/F	31	Shane Battier	6 ft 8 in (2.03 m)	220 lb (100 kg)		Duke
PG	11	Mike Conley Jr.	6 ft 1 in (1.85 m)	185 lb (84 kg)		Ohio State
C	33	Marc Gasol	7 ft 1 in (2.16 m)	265 lb (120 kg)		Spain
SF	22	Rudy Gay (IN)	6 ft 8 in (2.03 m)	230 lb (104 kg)		Connecticut
C	15	Hamed Haddadi	7 ft 2 in (2.18 m)	265 lb (120 kg)		Iran
SG	13	Xavier Henry (IN)	6 ft 6 in (1.98 m)	220 lb (100 kg)		Kansas
SG	32	O. J. Mayo	6 ft 4 in (1.93 m)	210 lb (95 kg)		USC
F	7	Leon Powe	6 ft 8 in (2.03 m)	240 lb (109 kg)		California
PF	50	Zach Randolph	6 ft 9 in (2.06 m)	260 lb (118 kg)		Michigan State
G	5	Ishmael Smith	6 ft 0 in (1.83 m)	175 lb (79 kg)		Wake Forest
PG	21	Greivis Vasquez	6 ft 6 in (1.98 m)	211 lb (96 kg)		Maryland
SF	4	Sam Young	6 ft 6 in (1.98 m)	220 lb (100 kg)		Pittsburgh

Coaches
Head coach
- Lionel Hollins
Assistant(s)
- Johnny Davis
- Henry Bibby
- Berry Hecker
- Dave Joerger
- Damon Stoudamire

Legend
- (DP) Unsigned draft pick
- (FA) Free agent
- (S) Suspended
- Injured

== Pre-season ==
=== Game log ===
2010 pre-season game log
Pre-season: 8–0 (home: 4–0; road: 4–0)

Game	Date	Team	Score	High points	High rebounds	High assists	Location Attendance	Record
1	October 6	Indiana	W 87–85	Rudy Gay (12)	Marc Gasol (9)	Mike Conley Jr. (7)	FedExForum; 8,618	1–0
2	October 7	@ Atlanta	W 115–111 (OT)	Acie Law (19)	Zach Randolph (8)	Acie Law (5)	Philips Arena; 7,132	2–0
3	October 9	@ New Orleans	W 97–90	Zach Randolph (21)	Marc Gasol (10)	Mike Conley Jr. (4)	New Orleans Arena; 11,461	3–0
4	October 12	@ Oklahoma City	W 116–96	Marc Gasol (19)	Marc Gasol (8)	Acie Law (6)	BOK Center; 11,297	4–0
5	October 14	Caja Laboral	W 110–105	Mike Conley Jr. (27)	Darrell Arthur (9)	Acie Law (5)	FedExForum; 7,940	5–0
6	October 16	Milwaukee	W 91–77	Rudy Gay (17)	Rudy Gay (9)	Acie Law (5)	FedExForum; 9,767	6–0
7	October 18	New Orleans	W 96–91	Mike Conley Jr. (19)	Darrell Arthur, Hasheem Thabeet (7)	Mike Conley Jr., Marc Gasol, O. J. Mayo (4)	FedExForum; 8,268	7–0
8	October 22	@ Detroit	W 106–103	Marc Gasol, Sam Young (16)	DeMarre Carroll; Hamed Haddadi (7)	Mike Conley Jr.	The Palace of Auburn Hills; 18,528	8–0

2010–11 season schedule

== Regular season ==
=== Standings ===
Southwest Division	W	L	PCT	GB	Home	Road	Div
c-San Antonio Spurs	61	21	.744	–	36–5	25–16	10–6
x-Dallas Mavericks	57	25	.695	4	29–12	28–13	8–8
x-New Orleans Hornets	46	36	.561	15	28–13	18–23	9–7
x-Memphis Grizzlies	46	36	.561	15	30–11	16–25	8–8
Houston Rockets	43	39	.524	18	25–16	18–23	5–11

#	Western Conference				
#	Team	W	L	PCT	GB
1	c-San Antonio Spurs	61	21	.744	–
2	y-Los Angeles Lakers	57	25	.695	4
3	x-Dallas Mavericks	57	25	.695	4
4	y-Oklahoma City Thunder	55	27	.671	6
5	x-Denver Nuggets	50	32	.610	11
6	x-Portland Trail Blazers	48	34	.585	13
7	x-New Orleans Hornets	46	36	.561	15
8	x-Memphis Grizzlies	46	36	.561	15
9	Houston Rockets	43	39	.524	18
10	Phoenix Suns	40	42	.488	21
11	Utah Jazz	39	43	.476	22
12	Golden State Warriors	36	46	.439	25
13	Los Angeles Clippers	32	50	.390	29
14	Sacramento Kings	24	58	.293	37
15	Minnesota Timberwolves	17	65	.207	44

=== Game log ===
2010–11 game log
Total: 46–36 (home: 30–11; road: 16–25)
October: 2–1 (home: 1–1; road: 1–0)

Game	Date	Team	Score	High points	High rebounds	High assists	Location Attendance	Record
1	October 27	Atlanta	L 104–119	Mike Conley Jr. (23)	Rudy Gay (10)	Mike Conley Jr. (8)	FedExForum; 17,519	0–1
2	October 29	@ Dallas	W 91–90	Rudy Gay (21)	Marc Gasol (15)	Mike Conley Jr. (6)	American Airlines Center; 20,060	1–1
3	October 30	Minnesota	W 109–89	O. J. Mayo (29)	Marc Gasol (8)	Mike Conley Jr. (11)	FedExForum; 12,753	2–1

November: 6–9 (home: 5–3; road: 1–6)

Game	Date	Team	Score	High points	High rebounds	High assists	Location Attendance	Record
4	November 2	@ LA Lakers	L 105–124	Rudy Gay (30)	Marc Gasol (8)	Mike Conley Jr. (8)	Staples Center; 18,997	2–2
5	November 3	@ Golden State	L 109–115	Rudy Gay (35)	Marc Gasol (8)	Mike Conley Jr. (13)	Oracle Arena; 16,607	2–3
6	November 5	@ Phoenix	L 118–123 (2OT)	Rudy Gay, Marc Gasol (26)	Zach Randolph (14)	Mike Conley Jr. (7)	US Airways Center; 16,470	2–4
7	November 6	@ Sacramento	W 100–91	Rudy Gay (32)	Zach Randolph (11)	Mike Conley Jr. (5)	ARCO Arena; 14,085	3–4
8	November 8	Phoenix	W 109–99	Zach Randolph (23)	Zach Randolph (20)	Mike Conley Jr. (6)	FedExForum; 10,786	4–4
9	November 10	Dallas	L 91–106	Zach Randolph (23)	Rudy Gay, Zach Randolph (9)	Mike Conley Jr. (5)	FedExForum; 10,767	4–5
10	November 13	Boston	L 110–116 (OT)	Rudy Gay (22)	Zach Randolph (11)	Marc Gasol (5)	FedExForum; 18,119	4–6
11	November 15	@ Orlando	L 72–89	Marc Gasol (14)	Zach Randolph, Rudy Gay (9)	Mike Conley Jr. (8)	Amway Center; 18,846	4–7
12	November 16	Portland	L 99–100	Rudy Gay (20)	Zach Randolph (14)	Mike Conley Jr. (6)	FedExForum; 10,827	4–8
13	November 19	@ Washington	L 86–89	Zach Randolph (19)	Zach Randolph (12)	Mike Conley Jr. (6)	Verizon Center; 13,504	4–9
14	November 20	Miami	W 97–95	Zach Randolph (21)	Zach Randolph (13)	Mike Conley Jr. (6)	FedExForum; 18,119	5–9
15	November 24	Detroit	W 105–84	Zach Randolph (21)	Zach Randolph (14)	Mike Conley Jr. (7)	FedExForum; 11,283	6–9
16	November 26	Golden State	W 116–111	Rudy Gay (25)	Zach Randolph (7)	Mike Conley Jr. (5)	FedExForum; 14,753	7–9
17	November 27	@ Cleveland	L 86–92	Rudy Gay (17)	Zach Randolph (11)	Rudy Gay (6)	Quicken Loans Arena; 20,562	7–10
18	November 30	LA Lakers	W 98–96	Mike Conley Jr. (28)	Marc Gasol, Zach Randolph (9)	Zach Randolph (4)	FedExForum; 17,638	8–10

December: 6–8 (home: 3–2; road: 3–6)

Game	Date	Team	Score	High points	High rebounds	High assists	Location Attendance	Record
19	December 1	@ Atlanta	L 109–112	Rudy Gay (23)	Zach Randolph (19)	Mike Conley Jr. (9)	Philips Arena; 11,513	8–11
20	December 3	Houston	L 111–127	Rudy Gay (29)	Zach Randolph (8)	Mike Conley Jr. (8)	FedExForum; 14,577	8–12
21	December 5	@ Denver	L 107–108	Rudy Gay (24)	Zach Randolph (12)	Mike Conley Jr. (9)	Pepsi Center; 15,017	8–13
22	December 6	@ Utah	L 85–94	Mike Conley Jr. (19)	Zach Randolph (14)	Mike Conley Jr., Marc Gasol (5)	EnergySolutions Arena; 19,131	8–14
23	December 8	@ Phoenix	W 104–98 (OT)	Zach Randolph (34)	Zach Randolph (17)	Mike Conley Jr. (14)	US Airways Center; 16,288	9–14
24	December 11	@ LA Clippers	W 84–83	Zach Randolph (18)	Zach Randolph (13)	Mike Conley Jr. (8)	Staples Center; 14,970	10–14
25	December 13	Portland	W 86–73	Zach Randolph (25)	Zach Randolph (20)	Mike Conley Jr. (3)	FedExForum; 10,467	11–14
26	December 15	Charlotte	W 113–80	O. J. Mayo (24)	Marc Gasol (10)	Mike Conley Jr. (9)	FedExForum; 12,219	12–14
27	December 17	@ Houston	L 87–103	Rudy Gay, Sam Young (19)	Zach Randolph (9)	Mike Conley Jr., Rudy Gay, O. J. Mayo (3)	Toyota Center; 14,534	12–15
28	December 18	@ San Antonio	L 106–112 (OT)	O. J. Mayo (27)	Zach Randolph (21)	Mike Conley Jr. (8)	AT&T Center; 18,581	12–16
29	December 21	New Jersey	L 94–101	Marc Gasol (19)	Zach Randolph (14)	Mike Conley Jr. (8)	FedExForum; 14,112	12–17
30	December 26	@ Indiana	W 104–90	Rudy Gay (30)	Zach Randolph (16)	Mike Conley Jr. (10)	Conseco Fieldhouse; 12,630	13–17
31	December 27	Toronto	W 96–85	Zach Randolph (21)	Tony Allen, Zach Randolph (8)	Mike Conley Jr., Rudy Gay (6)	FedExForum; 14,971	14–17
32	December 29	@ Sacramento	L 98–100	Zach Randolph (35)	Zach Randolph (17)	Mike Conley Jr. (7)	ARCO Arena; 12,636	14–18

January: 11–6 (home: 6–1; road: 5–5)

Game	Date	Team	Score	High points	High rebounds	High assists	Location Attendance	Record
33	January 1	@ Utah	L 92–98	Zach Randolph (27)	Zach Randolph (16)	Mike Conley Jr. (7)	EnergySolutions Arena; 19,732	14–19
34	January 2	@ LA Lakers	W 104–85	Rudy Gay (27)	Marc Gasol (10)	Mike Conley Jr., Marc Gasol (6)	Staples Center; 18,997	15–19
35	January 4	Oklahoma City	W 110–105	Zach Randolph (31)	Zach Randolph (16)	Mike Conley Jr. (9)	FedExForum; 12,765	16–19
36	January 7	Utah	W 110–99	Rudy Gay (28)	Zach Randolph (11)	Greivis Vásquez (7)	FedExForum; 14,781	17–19
37	January 8	@ Oklahoma City	L 100–109	Zach Randolph (27)	Zach Randolph (16)	Greivis Vásquez (6)	Oklahoma City Arena; 18,203	17–20
38	January 10	@ Charlotte	L 82–96	Zach Randolph (15)	Zach Randolph (15)	Mike Conley Jr. (7)	Time Warner Cable Arena; 10,188	17–21
39	January 12	@ Detroit	W 107–99	Zach Randolph (34)	Zach Randolph (17)	Mike Conley Jr. (9)	The Palace of Auburn Hills; 13,068	18–21
40	January 15	Dallas	W 89–70	Zach Randolph (23)	Zach Randolph (20)	Mike Conley Jr. (6)	FedExForum; 15,812	19–21
41	January 17	Chicago	L 84–96	Zach Randolph (21)	Zach Randolph (13)	Mike Conley Jr. (6)	FedExForum; 18,119	19–22
42	January 19	@ New Orleans	L 102–103 (OT)	Mike Conley Jr., Rudy Gay (22)	Marc Gasol, Zach Randolph (10)	Mike Conley Jr., Marc Gasol, Rudy Gay (5)	New Orleans Arena; 15,951	19–23
43	January 21	Houston	W 115–110	Zach Randolph (29)	Zach Randolph (19)	Mike Conley Jr., Rudy Gay (5)	FedExForum; 13,458	20–23
44	January 22	@ Milwaukee	W 94–81	Marc Gasol (24)	Marc Gasol (16)	Greivis Vásquez (4)	Bradley Center; 16,157	21–23
45	January 24	@ Toronto	W 100–98	Rudy Gay (21)	Zach Randolph (12)	Mike Conley Jr., Marc Gasol (4)	Air Canada Centre; 14,127	22–23
46	January 26	@ New Jersey	L 88–93	Rudy Gay (22)	Zach Randolph (16)	Mike Conley Jr., Marc Gasol (5)	Prudential Center; 8,866	22–24
47	January 28	@ Philadelphia	W 99–94	Zach Randolph (22)	Zach Randolph (12)	Marc Gasol (5)	Wells Fargo Center; 14,289	23–24
48	January 29	Washington	W 107–93	Zach Randolph (24)	Zach Randolph (20)	Mike Conley Jr. (12)	FedExForum; 14,722	24–24
49	January 31	Orlando	W 100–97	Mike Conley Jr. (26)	Zach Randolph (9)	Mike Conley Jr. (11)	FedExForum; 13,513	25–24

February: 8–4 (home: 5–1; road: 3–3)

Game	Date	Team	Score	High points	High rebounds	High assists	Location Attendance	Record
50	February 2	@ Minnesota	W 102–84	Zach Randolph (23)	Zach Randolph (13)	Mike Conley Jr. (9)	Target Center; 12,662	26–24
51	February 4	Cleveland	W 112–105	Zach Randolph (29)	Zach Randolph (13)	Mike Conley Jr. (8)	FedExForum; 11,932	27–24
52	February 5	@ Houston	L 93–95 (OT)	Zach Randolph (22)	Zach Randolph (17)	Mike Conley Jr. (5)	Toyota Center; 18,195	27–25
53	February 7	LA Lakers	L 84–93	Sam Young (22)	Marc Gasol, Zach Randolph (12)	Mike Conley Jr., Zach Randolph (4)	FedExForum; 18,119	27–26
54	February 8	@ Oklahoma City	W 105–101 (OT)	Zach Randolph (31)	Zach Randolph (14)	Mike Conley Jr., Zach Randolph (4)	Oklahoma City Arena; 17,868	28–26
55	February 11	Milwaukee	W 89–86	Mike Conley Jr. (23)	Rudy Gay (10)	Mike Conley Jr. (8)	FedExForum; 14,749	29–26
56	February 13	Denver	W 116–108	Darrell Arthur (24)	Zach Randolph (16)	Mike Conley Jr. (5)	FedExForum; 15,398	30–26
57	February 15	Philadelphia	W 102–91	Mike Conley Jr. (22)	Zach Randolph (10)	Zach Randolph (7)	FedExForum; 11,197	31–26
All-Star Break
58	February 22	@ Denver	L 107–120	Tony Allen (26)	Tony Allen, Zach Randolph (8)	Jason Williams (9)	Pepsi Center; 14,638	31–27
59	February 23	@ Minnesota	W 104–95	Zach Randolph (24)	Zach Randolph (10)	Mike Conley Jr. (9)	Target Center; 11,497	32–27
60	February 26	Sacramento	W 120–92	Zach Randolph (23)	Zach Randolph (12)	Jason Williams (5)	FedExForum; 16,028	33–27
61	February 27	@ San Antonio	L 88–95	Zach Randolph (24)	Zach Randolph (17)	Marc Gasol (7)	AT&T Center; 18,581	33–28

March: 9–5 (home: 7–2; road: 2–3)

Game	Date	Team	Score	High points	High rebounds	High assists	Location Attendance	Record
62	March 1	San Antonio	W 109–93	Darrell Arthur, Zach Randolph (21)	Zach Randolph (10)	Mike Conley Jr. (9)	FedExForum; 13,480	34–28
63	March 4	New Orleans	L 91–98	Zach Randolph (20)	Zach Randolph (11)	O. J. Mayo (6)	FedExForum; 15,367	34–29
64	March 6	@ Dallas	W 104–103	Zach Randolph (27)	Shane Battier (11)	Mike Conley Jr. (10)	American Airlines Center; 20,102	35–29
65	March 7	Oklahoma City	W 107–101	Tony Allen, Mike Conley Jr. (20)	Shane Battier, O. J. Mayo (7)	Mike Conley Jr. (9)	FedExForum; 13,903	36–29
66	March 9	New York	L 108–110	Tony Allen (22)	Zach Randolph (11)	Mike Conley Jr. (6)	FedExForum; 17,512	36–30
67	March 12	@ Miami	L 85–118	O. J. Mayo (19)	Zach Randolph (9)	Mike Conley Jr. (10)	American Airlines Arena; 19,600	36–31
68	March 14	@ LA Clippers	W 105–82	Zach Randolph (30)	Zach Randolph (12)	Mike Conley Jr. (5)	FedExForum; 15,989	37–31
69	March 17	@ New York	L 99–120	Mike Conley Jr. (16)	Darrell Arthur (7)	Mike Conley Jr. (6)	Madison Square Garden; 19,763	37–32
70	March 19	Indiana	W 99–78	Tony Allen (19)	Tony Allen (11)	Mike Conley Jr. (9)	FedExForum; 17,013	38–32
71	March 21	Utah	W 103–85	Zach Randolph (19)	Zach Randolph (13)	Mike Conley Jr. (11)	FedExForum; 12,688	39–32
72	March 23	@ Boston	W 90–87	Leon Powe, Zach Randolph (13)	Marc Gasol (11)	Mike Conley Jr. (5)	TD Garden; 18,624	40–32
73	March 25	@ Chicago	L 96–99	Zach Randolph (16)	Marc Gasol (11)	Mike Conley Jr. (6)	United Center; 22,274	40–33
74	March 27	San Antonio	W 111–104	Tony Allen, Zach Randolph (23)	Zach Randolph (11)	Mike Conley Jr., Marc Gasol (4)	FedExForum; 17,098	41–33
75	March 30	Golden State	W 110–91	Tony Allen (21)	Zach Randolph (13)	Mike Conley Jr. (7)	FedExForum; 13,815	42–33

April: 4–3 (home: 3–1; road: 1–2)

Game	Date	Team	Score	High points	High rebounds	High assists	Location Attendance	Record
76	April 1	@ New Orleans	W 93–81	Zach Randolph (28)	Marc Gasol, Zach Randolph (10)	Mike Conley Jr., Zach Randolph (7)	New Orleans Arena; 16,561	43–33
77	April 2	Minnesota	W 106–89	Zach Randolph (22)	Marc Gasol (9)	Mike Conley Jr. (9)	FedExForum; 15,327	44–33
78	April 5	LA Clippers	L 81–82	Mike Conley Jr. (20)	Marc Gasol (15)	Mike Conley Jr. (4)	FedExForum; 15,433	44–34
79	April 8	Sacramento	W 101–96	Zach Randolph (27)	Zach Randolph (15)	Mike Conley Jr. (8)	FedExForum; 16,517	45–34
80	April 10	New Orleans	W 111–89	O. J. Mayo (18)	Marc Gasol, Hamed Haddadi (7)	Zach Randolph (6)	FedExForum; 17,041	46–34
81	April 12	@ Portland	L 89–102	Mike Conley Jr. (17)	Hamed Haddadi, Marc Gasol (10)	O. J. Mayo (3)	Rose Garden; 20,662	46–35
82	April 13	@ LA Clippers	L 103–110	Sam Young (22)	Darrell Arthur (9)	O. J. Mayo, Greivis Vásquez, Sam Young (4)	Staples Center; 19,060	46–36

2010–11 season schedule

== Playoffs ==
=== Game log ===
2011 playoff game log
First Round: 4–2 (home: 3–0; road: 1–2)

Game	Date	Team	Score	High points	High rebounds	High assists	Location Attendance	Series
1	April 17	@ San Antonio	W 101–98	Zach Randolph (25)	Zach Randolph (14)	Mike Conley Jr. (10)	AT&T Center; 18,581	1–0
2	April 20	@ San Antonio	L 87–93	Sam Young (17)	Marc Gasol (17)	Mike Conley Jr. (4)	AT&T Center; 18,760	1–1
3	April 23	San Antonio	W 91–88	Zach Randolph (25)	Marc Gasol (9)	Mike Conley Jr. (8)	FedExForum; 18,119	2–1
4	April 25	San Antonio	W 104–86	Mike Conley Jr. (15)	Marc Gasol, Zach Randolph (9)	Mike Conley Jr. (7)	FedExForum; 18,119	3–1
5	April 27	@ San Antonio	L 103–110 (OT)	Zach Randolph (26)	Marc Gasol (17)	Zach Randolph (6)	AT&T Center; 18,581	3–2
6	April 29	San Antonio	W 99–91	Zach Randolph (31)	Marc Gasol (13)	Mike Conley Jr. (3)	FedExForum; 18,119	4–2

Conference Semifinals: 3–4 (home: 2–1; road: 1–3)

Game	Date	Team	Score	High points	High rebounds	High assists	Location Attendance	Series
1	May 1	@ Oklahoma City	W 114–101	Zach Randolph (34)	Marc Gasol (13)	Mike Conley Jr. (7)	Oklahoma City Arena; 18,203	1–0
2	May 3	@ Oklahoma City	L 102–111	Mike Conley Jr. (24)	Marc Gasol (10)	Mike Conley Jr. (8)	Oklahoma City Arena; 18,203	1–1
3	May 7	Oklahoma City	W 101–93 (OT)	Zach Randolph (21)	Zach Randolph (21)	Mike Conley Jr., O. J. Mayo (4)	FedExForum; 18,119	2–1
4	May 9	Oklahoma City	L 123–133 (3OT)	Zach Randolph (34)	Marc Gasol (21)	Mike Conley Jr., O. J. Mayo (5)	FedExForum; 18,119	2–2
5	May 11	@ Oklahoma City	L 72–99	Marc Gasol (15)	Zach Randolph (7)	Mike Conley Jr., O. J. Mayo (4)	Oklahoma City Arena; 18,203	2–3
6	May 13	Oklahoma City	W 95–83	Zach Randolph (30)	Zach Randolph (13)	Mike Conley Jr. (12)	FedExForum; 18,119	3–3
7	May 15	@ Oklahoma City	L 90–105	Mike Conley Jr. (18)	Zach Randolph (10)	Mike Conley Jr. (6)	Oklahoma City Arena; 18,203	3–4

2011 playoff schedule

== Player statistics ==
=== Regular season ===
Player	POS	GP	GS	MP	REB	AST	STL	BLK	PTS	MPG	RPG	APG	SPG	BPG	PPG
Mike Conley Jr.	PG	81	81	2,872	247	528	144	18	1,107	35.5	3.0	6.5	1.8	.2	13.7
Marc Gasol	C	81	81	2,586	569	200	74	136	951	31.9	7.0	2.5	.9	1.7	11.7
Darrell Arthur	PF	80	9	1,609	342	53	52	63	729	20.1	4.3	.7	.7	.8	9.1
Sam Young	SF	78	46	1,577	187	71	68	23	572	20.2	2.4	.9	.9	.3	7.3
Zach Randolph	PF	75	74	2,724	914	163	63	25	1,504	36.3	12.2	2.2	.8	.3	20.1
Tony Allen	SG	72	31	1,494	193	104	129	44	643	20.8	2.7	1.4	1.8	.6	8.9
O. J. Mayo	SG	71	17	1,869	170	145	73	26	803	26.3	2.4	2.0	1.0	.4	11.3
Greivis Vásquez	PG	70	1	860	73	151	22	4	249	12.3	1.0	2.2	.3	.1	3.6
Rudy Gay	SF	54	54	2,152	336	153	91	58	1,069	39.9	6.2	2.8	1.7	1.1	19.8
Hasheem Thabeet^{†}	C	45	0	369	75	4	9	15	53	8.2	1.7	.1	.2	.3	1.2
Xavier Henry	SG	38	16	527	37	18	11	3	165	13.9	1.0	.5	.3	.1	4.3
Hamed Haddadi	C	31	0	168	68	5	2	13	75	5.4	2.2	.2	.1	.4	2.4
Shane Battier^{†}	SF	23	0	557	92	32	16	10	115	24.2	4.0	1.4	.7	.4	5.0
Leon Powe^{†}	C	16	0	141	25	5	3	1	88	8.8	1.6	.3	.2	.1	5.5
Ish Smith^{†}	PG	15	0	113	5	15	5	0	27	7.5	.3	1.0	.3	.0	1.8
Jason Williams^{†}	PG	11	0	124	8	28	3	1	21	11.3	.7	2.5	.3	.1	1.9
Acie Law^{†}	PG	11	0	94	11	14	4	0	12	8.5	1.0	1.3	.4	.0	1.1
DeMarre Carroll^{†}	PF	7	0	39	8	2	1	1	10	5.6	1.1	.3	.1	.1	1.4
Rodney Carney^{†}	SF	2	0	5	1	0	1	0	2	2.5	.5	.0	.5	.0	1.0

- ^{†} Denotes player spent time with another team in the season. Stats reflect time with the Grizzlies only.

=== Playoffs ===
Player	POS	GP	GS	MP	REB	AST	STL	BLK	PTS	MPG	RPG	APG	SPG	BPG	PPG
Marc Gasol	C	13	13	519	146	29	14	28	195	39.9	11.2	2.2	1.1	2.2	15.0
Zach Randolph	PF	13	13	515	141	31	14	10	289	39.6	10.8	2.4	1.1	.8	22.2
Mike Conley Jr.	PG	13	13	507	50	83	14	3	197	39.0	3.8	6.4	1.1	.2	15.2
Tony Allen	SG	13	13	350	38	20	25	5	114	26.9	2.9	1.5	1.9	.4	8.8
Sam Young	SF	13	11	256	30	2	6	3	98	19.7	2.3	.2	.5	.2	7.5
O. J. Mayo	SG	13	2	362	41	31	11	4	147	27.8	3.2	2.4	.8	.3	11.3
Shane Battier	SF	13	0	339	52	15	7	6	72	26.1	4.0	1.2	.5	.5	5.5
Darrell Arthur	PF	13	0	201	29	7	7	12	92	15.5	2.2	.5	.5	.9	7.1
Greivis Vásquez	PG	13	0	142	19	25	5	2	56	10.9	1.5	1.9	.4	.2	4.3
Hamed Haddadi	C	9	0	31	8	0	0	5	11	3.4	.9	.0	.0	.6	1.2
Ish Smith	PG	5	0	10	2	2	1	0	4	2.0	.4	.4	.2	.0	.8
Leon Powe	C	4	0	14	4	0	0	0	7	3.5	1.0	.0	.0	.0	1.8

== Awards, records and milestones ==
=== Awards ===
==== Week/Month ====
Week	Player	Ref.
Jan. 3 – Jan. 9	Zach Randolph	
Jan. 24 – Jan. 30	Zach Randolph	
Mar. 28 – Apr. 3	Zach Randolph	

Month	Player	Ref.
January	Zach Randolph	

==== Season ====
- Zach Randolph was named to the All-NBA Third Team. It was his first All-NBA selection.
- Tony Allen was named to the NBA All-Defensive Second Team. It was his first All-Defensive selection.

=== Milestones ===
- The Grizzlies won the first playoff game in franchise history with a victory over the San Antonio Spurs in game 1 of their first round series.
- The Grizzlies won the first home playoff game in franchise history with a victory over the San Antonio Spurs in game 3 of their first round series.
- The Grizzlies won the first playoff series in franchise history with a victory over the San Antonio Spurs in game 6 of their first round series. It was also only the fourth time in NBA history an eighth-seeded team defeated a first-seeded team, and only the second time in a best-of-seven series.

== Injuries and surgeries ==
- Rudy Gay suffered a dislocated left shoulder during a February 15 victory over the Philadelphia 76ers. Gay underwent surgery on March 25 and missed the remainder of the season.
- Xavier Henry missed much of the season with a knee sprain. He declined knee surgery.

== Transactions ==
=== Trades ===
June 24, 2010

February 24, 2011

To Dallas Mavericks

- No. 25 pick (Dominique Jones)
To Houston Rockets

- (Tanzania) Hasheem Thabeet
- (United States) DeMarre Carroll
- Future first-round pick
To Memphis Grizzlies

- Cash considerations
To Memphis Grizzlies

- (United States) Shane Battier
- (United States) Ishmael Smith

=== Free agents ===
==== Additions ====
Player	Signed	Former Team
Rudy Gay	Signed 5-year contract for $82 Million	Memphis Grizzlies
Tony Allen	Signed 3-year contract for $10 Million	Boston Celtics
Rodney Carney	Signed 10-day contract	Golden State Warriors

==== Subtractions ====
Player	Reason Left	New Team
Lester Hudson	Waived	N/A
Ronnie Brewer	Free agent	Chicago Bulls
Jason Williams	Retired	n/a
