= 2010–11 Oklahoma City Thunder season =

NBA professional basketball team season

- Division champions
- Head coach: Scott Brooks
- General manager: Sam Presti
- Owners: Professional Basketball Club LLC
- Arena: Oklahoma City Arena

Results
- Record: 55–27 (.671)
- Place: Division: 1st (Northwest); Conference: 4th (Western)
- Playoff finish: Western Conference Finals (lost to Mavericks 1–4)
- Stats at Basketball Reference

Local media
- Television: Fox Sports Oklahoma
- Radio: WWLS-AM; FM

The 2010–11 Oklahoma City Thunder season was the 3rd season of the franchise's existence in Oklahoma City as a member of the National Basketball Association (NBA). The franchise built on its prior success from the previous year, winning 55 regular-season games and reaching the Western Conference finals – in the process becoming the second-youngest team ever to do so.

In the playoffs, the Thunder defeated the Denver Nuggets in five games in the First Round, and the Memphis Grizzlies in seven games in the conference semi-finals, before losing to the eventual NBA champion Dallas Mavericks in five games in the conference finals.

== Previous season ==
The Thunder finished the 2009–10 season 50–32 to finish in fourth place in the Northwest Division, eighth in the Western Conference and qualified for the playoffs. The Thunder made it to the playoffs for the first since the franchise moved to Oklahoma City but were defeated 4–2 against the Los Angeles Lakers.

== Offseason ==
=== Draft picks ===
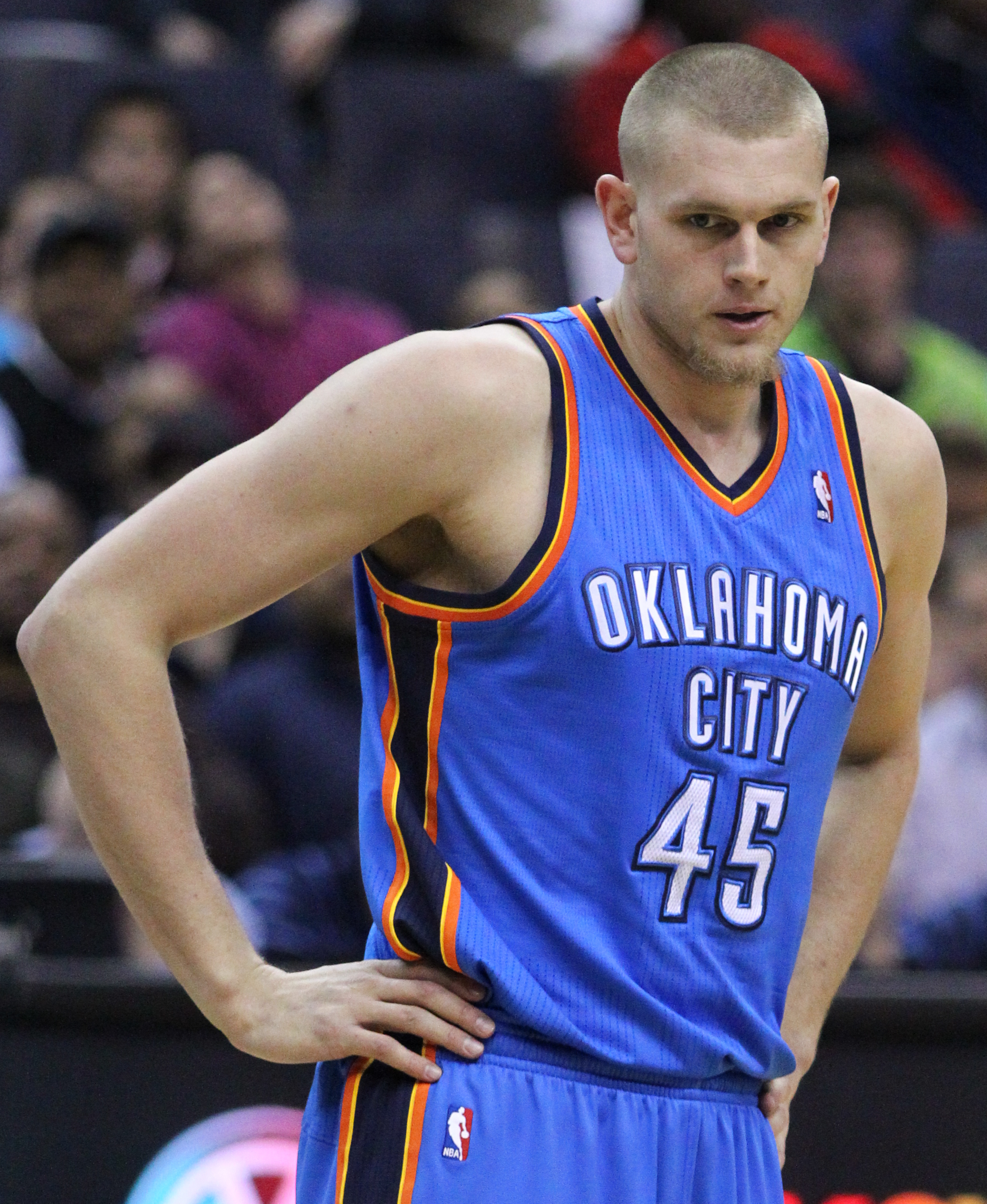
Cole Aldrich was traded to the Oklahoma City Thunder.

Round	Pick	Player	Position	Nationality	College/club team
1	18	Eric Bledsoe	SG	United States	Kentucky
1	21	Craig Brackins	PF	United States	Iowa State
1	26	Quincy Pondexter	SF	United States	Washington
2	51	Magnum Rolle	PF	Bahamas	Louisiana Tech
Cole Aldrich, Tibor Pleiss, Latavious Williams, and Ryan Reid were later traded to the Thunder

The Thunder had three first-round picks and one second-round pick entering the draft. The Thunder's 18th overall pick was originally acquired from the Miami Heat as a result of the Daequan Cook trade prior to the draft. The Thunder also acquired the 26th overall pick originally owned by the Phoenix Suns in the Kurt Thomas trade in 2007. In the second round, the Thunder acquired the 51st overall pick originally owned by the Minnesota Timberwolves in the Etan Thomas trade. The Thunder traded their 2010 second-round pick in the Byron Mullens trade back in 2009.

On draft night, the Thunder made four trades to acquire a future first-round pick and draft rights to three players. The Thunder traded the draft rights to Eric Bledsoe, the eighteenth pick, to the Los Angeles Clippers in exchange for a future first-round pick. The Thunder traded cash considerations to the Atlanta Hawks for Tibor Pleiss, the thirty-first pick. The Thunder then traded a future second-round pick swap to the Miami Heat in exchange for draft rights to Latavious Williams, the forty-eighth pick. Finally, the Thunder traded Magnum Rolle, the fifty-first pick, to the Indiana Pacers in exchange for Ryan Reid, the fifty-seventh pick.

Two weeks later, the Thunder traded the draft rights to Craig Brackins, the twenty-first pick, and Quincy Pondexter, the twenty-sixth pick, to the New Orleans Hornets in exchange for the draft rights to Cole Aldrich, the eleventh pick, and Morris Peterson.

The Thunder ended 2010 NBA draft night and the conclusion of player acquisitions and transactions, with Kansas center Cole Aldrich, Brose Basket center Tibor Pleiss, Tulsa 66ers of the NBA D-League forward Latavious Williams, and Florida State forward Ryan Reid.

=== International participation ===
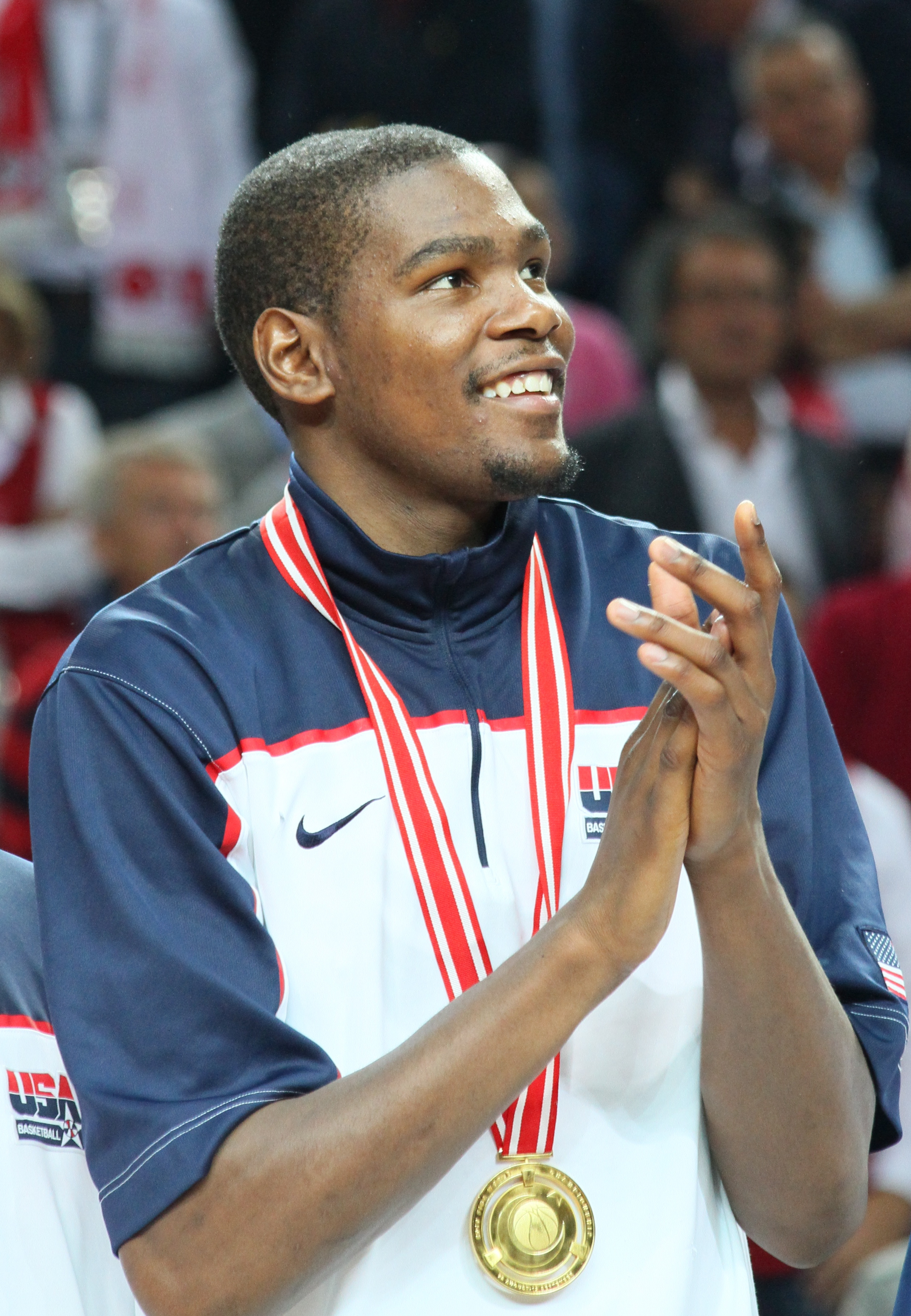
Durant after receiving the gold medal at the 2010 FIBA World Championship

In February 2010, the USA National Basketball Team named Thunder players Kevin Durant and Russell Westbrook to the 27-man national team roster for 2010–12. From July 19–24, 2010, Durant, Westbrook and Jeff Green each attended tryout camp in Las Vegas for inclusion on the 12-man USA National Team roster at the 2010 FIBA World Championship, to take place from August 28 to September 12, 2010, in Turkey. In late July, Durant, Westbrook and Green were each named to the narrowed 15-man USA Team roster, which participated in additional workouts August 9–16 in New York City. On August 15, 2010, Westbrook and Durant were named to the narrowed 13-man roster, which competed from August 17–20 in Madrid, Spain. On August 24, 2010, the final 12-man roster was effectively determined when USA Basketball member Rajon Rondo withdrew from Team USA. This made Durant and Westbrook the only members of Team USA from the same NBA squad. In addition, Thunder athletic trainer Joe Sharpe also traveled as a team assistant. Thunder players participating on other FIBA teams included Nenad Krstić (who was suspended for Serbia's first three games following a chair-throwing incident in a tune-up match against Greece at the Acropolis Tournament on August 19), and Tibor Pleiß for Germany.

At the 2010 FIBA tournament, Team USA won the championship game against Turkey, and Serbia ended the tournament in fourth place. Germany did not advance to the elimination-round phase of the competition. Durant was named the tournament's Most Valuable Player, and was also a first-team All-Tournament selection. For his efforts, Durant was also awarded the 2010 Male Athlete of the Year award by USA Basketball.

=== Training ===
The Thunder attended the Orlando Pro Summer League from July 5–9, 2010, during which the team won four games and lost one. No Thunder starters were assigned to Orlando; Harden, Serge Ibaka and Eric Maynor were the most experienced players on the summer roster. The Thunder also signed forward Marcus Lewis and guard Cliff Hammonds as free agents on the summer roster. Both Durant and Daequan Cook attended the event and participated in informal workouts. Harden averaged 17.5 points over five games, good for fifth in the summer league standings. Maynor averaged 5.0 assists over three games, good for fourth.

=== Front office and coaching changes ===
Just before the end of the 2010 playoffs, the Thunder announced that the team had exercised extension rights on its contract with Coach Scott Brooks, keeping him under contract through the 2011–12 season. Under the contract, Brooks earns in excess of $1.5 million per season. Later, on July 22, 2010, the team announced signing its general manager Sam Presti to a multi-year deal, terms of which were not disclosed.

Assistant coaching and staff positions, however, changed over the summer. In late June, Thunder assistant coach Ron Adams took a similar position with the Chicago Bulls under their new head coach Tom Thibodeau. As of July, the Thunder had no immediate plans to directly replace Adams. On August 24, 2010, the Thunder added former international coach Maz Trakh as an assistant coach in charge of player development, in addition to confirming the retention of remaining assistant coaches Maurice Cheeks, Mark Bryant, Rex Kalamian, and Brian Keefe.

On July 19, 2010, Thunder Assistant general manager Rich Cho left to take the vacant general manager's position with the Portland Trail Blazers. Former Thunder Director of Pro Personnel Bill Branch also joined Cho in Portland. The Thunder subsequently promoted Troy Weaver to vice president/assistant general manager, Rob Hennigan to assistant general manager/player personnel, Paul Rivers to director of minor league operations and basketball technology and Brandon Barnett to director of minor league scouting and manager of minor league operations. At the same time, the Thunder announced the additions of Michael Winger as Assistant general manager for Legal/Administration, and David Vanterpool as a scout.

=== Promotion and media news ===
In June 2010, Durant and teammate James Harden completed a week-long promotional tour of China sponsored by Nike. Durant was also unveiled as the featured athlete on the cover of EA Sports' video game NBA Elite 11.

On August 3, 2010, the Thunder announced a multi-year contract granting FOX Sports Southwest the exclusive rights to regional television broadcasts of Thunder games.

On August 26, 2010, the Thunder organization announced that it would exercise its right to re-open naming rights negotiations for the Ford Center, which effectively guarantees a name change for the facility in the near future.

Thunder players Durant, Krstić, and Thabo Sefolosha were featured on the October 19, 2010, cover of Sports Illustrated's 2010 NBA Preview edition, with an accompanying feature article by SI Correspondent Lee Jenkins.

== Season synopsis ==
=== Preseason ===
The Thunder's pre-season training camp opened on September 28, 2010, with the temporary roster addition of guards Demond "Tweety" Carter, Jerome Dyson and Elijah Millsap, as well as center Longar Longar. Carter and Longar were subsequently waived and removed from the roster on October 15, 2010, after one pre-season appearance each. The Thunder's final two pre-season roster additions, Dyson and Millsap, were waived on October 20, 2010 – leaving the team roster at the required 15 members heading into the regular season.

=== Regular season ===
The Thunder's playoff run in 2009–10 fueled early-season interest for 2010–11. The team's regular-season schedule, released on August 10, 2010, revealed fifteen nationally televised games, up from three in the previous year. The Thunder also ranked among the NBA's top five teams in new season ticket sales heading into the year. This was in addition to a 93% renewal rate for season tickets from the previous year, well above the NBA average of 80%.

The Thunder began their regular season at home against the Chicago Bulls with an Opening Night promotion that included outdoor entertainment, a new magazine publication, and a blue-attire theme. The Thunder won the opening game, 106 to 95.

The first two months of the season saw mixed, but generally positive results for the Thunder. Through December 10, 2010, the Thunder played a schedule which statistically ranked #5 in the NBA, and #3 in the Western Conference. Despite this, the team logged a .667 winning percentage over the period. Kevin Durant led the NBA in scoring over the period at 27.45 points per game, although he missed four games due to injury (the Thunder were 3–1 in those games). The early season was highlighted by strong performances by Russell Westbrook (who at 23.95 points per game improved his scoring average by almost 8 points per game compared to 2009–2010) and Serge Ibaka (who saw his playing time increase to over 27 minutes per game and was near the top of the league in blocks).

By the midway point in the season, the Thunder's cumulative team free-throw percentage stood at .83116, just slightly off the pace of the all-time NBA single-season record of .83186, set by the 1989–90 Boston Celtics. The team's three-point shooting, however, lagged behind other offensive categories; by early February, the team's cumulative three-point percentage was 32.8%, third-worst in the league. The Thunder's 27–14 record at the midpoint of the season was largely attributable to a potent offense (103.7 points per game, sixth in the NBA) making up for subpar defensive performance (102 opponents' points per game, 20th in the NBA). As of the All-Star break, the Thunder were rated #6 in the NBA's power ranking system, with a comparatively easy schedule over the remaining course of the season.

Through the first half of the season, the Thunder's rotation stayed relatively constant, with a starting five of:

- PG: Russell Westbrook
- SG: Thabo Sefolosha
- SF: Kevin Durant
- PF: Jeff Green
- C: Nenad Krstić

Except for periodic injuries, the starting rotation did not change until after the trading deadline on February 24, 2011. In various combinations, the Thunder generally used a nine-man rotation through January 2011, providing reserves Ibaka, Maynor, Harden and Nick Collison with significant playing time. During four games when Durant was out of the lineup with injury, the Thunder often utilized a lineup which simultaneously featured Green at the small forward spot with Ibaka at power forward, a combination featured more often as the early season unfolded. Starting with the January 28, 2011, game against Washington, shooting guard Daequan Cook began receiving significant minutes in the rotation, allowing the Thunder to substitute an entirely new second string on multiple occasions. This combination sparked some notable Thunder streaks, including the February 5 game against Utah and the February 15 game against Sacramento.

The starting rotation changed significantly after the February 24, 2011, trading deadline. In two deals made on that date, the Thunder sent starters Jeff Green and Nenad Krstić to the Boston Celtics, and acquired eventual starter at center Kendrick Perkins, backup center Nazr Mohammed, and backup point guard Nate Robinson. Perkins was unable to start immediately after his acquisition due to a left knee sprain suffered on February 22. In games on February 25 and 27, the Thunder elevated Ibaka and Collison into the starting rotation at power forward and center, respectively.

The immediate post-trade lineup shuffle resulted in the team's only three-game losing streak of the season, from February 23–27. This stretch, however, did include some bright spots, including a competitive performance against the Lakers on February 27 in which Cole Aldrich registered his best performance of the year. On March 2, Mohammed replaced Collison as starting center.

The starting lineup changed again on March 14 with the insertion of Kendrick Perkins at starting center. This solidified the starting lineup for the stretch run of the regular season as:

- PG: Russell Westbrook
- SG: Thabo Sefolosha
- SF: Kevin Durant
- PF: Serge Ibaka
- C: Kendrick Perkins

The most immediate beneficiary of the new lineup, however, was sixth man James Harden, who in the first 15 games after the All-Star break increased his scoring average from 10.3 to 17.7 points per game. The new lineup's first major test came in the March 16, 2011, game at Miami, which the Thunder won due to a shutdown defensive performance in the second half. Subsequently, the team was cited for lackluster play in a four-game stretch from March 18–25, but afterward put in an energetic performance against Portland at home on March 27, a win which clinched a playoff berth for the franchise for the second year in a row. The team subsequently clinched the Northwest Division championship with its April 6 victory against the Los Angeles Clippers.

The contributions of Cook and Harden in the second half of the season, combined with improved three-point shooting from Westbrook, allowed the team to bring its overall three-point shooting percentage to 34.7% by the end of the regular season, good for 19th in the league. Although the Thunder ended up leading the NBA in free-throw percentage at 82.3%, this number did not displace the 1989–90 Celtics record.

The Thunder were still in contention for a #2 overall playoff seed by the time of their last regular season game on April 13 against Milwaukee, the pre-game ceremonies for which featured the unveiling of a Northwest Division championship banner. However, the Thunder's overtime loss in that game, in which the starting rotation played limited minutes, guaranteed the overall #4 seed in the Western Conference and a first-round playoff matchup with the #5-seed Denver Nuggets. The Thunder ended the season with 55 wins, five more than the 2009–10 season. Overall during the regular season, they averaged 104.83 points per game (good for fifth in the league) while limiting opponents to 101.04 points per game (18th in the league).

Attendance at Thunder regular season games continued to be strong in 2010–11. Despite having one of the smaller arenas in the NBA, the Thunder drew an average of 18,148 spectators per contest, ranking 13th in the league. This translated into 99.7% of the overall capacity of the 18,203-seat Oklahoma City Arena, ranking 8th in the league.

==== Promotion and media news ====
In March 2011, the Thunder were named to Fast Company Magazine's list of the Ten Most Innovative Companies in Sports, ranked at #6.

In merchandising sales figures released by the NBA on April 13, 2011, the Thunder as a team generated the sixth-most jersey sales of all NBA teams; in addition, Kevin Durant's individual jersey ranked as the seventh-most popular in the NBA.

In the May/June 2011 issue of Dime Magazine, Kevin Durant and Russell Westbrook were featured on the cover and named "The NBA's best duo since Shaq and Kobe."

=== Playoffs ===
==== First round ====
The opening series of the playoffs against the Denver Nuggets was given extra attention when Denver coach George Karl described the Thunder team as "cocky" in comments made before the series. Game 1 of the series featured promotions similar to the "Opening Night" of the regular season, including a "blue-out" T-shirt giveaway and a "Thunder Alley" entertainment venue outside the arena. The crowd atmosphere for Game One was loud enough that it reportedly made Karl's six-year-old daughter cry. The game itself was highly competitive, featuring nine ties and nine lead changes. The Thunder's eventual 107–103 victory was aided by a basket occurring with just over one minute left in the game by Kendrick Perkins, which the NBA later admitted should have resulted in an offensive goaltending call. After a relatively easy Game 2 at home, the Thunder earned a hard-fought 97–94 victory in Game 3 at Denver, behind the remarkable performance of Serge Ibaka, who logged a career-high 22 points along with 16 rebounds. Denver avoided elimination in a Game 4 contest in which the Thunder's Russell Westbrook was criticized for selfish play in a 12-for-30 shooting performance. The Thunder finished the series in Game 5 by winning a dramatic comeback at home, which featured Kevin Durant scoring 16 of his 41 points in the fourth quarter.

==== Conference semifinals ====
The second round of the playoffs matched the Thunder against the Memphis Grizzlies, who had upset the #1-seeded San Antonio Spurs in a six-game series. Memphis dominated Game 1 in Oklahoma City behind a combined 54-point, 23-rebound performance by Marc Gasol and Zach Randolph. The Thunder's front court was able to play more aggressive defense against the duo in Game 2, leading to a 111-102 Thunder victory to tie the series. The next two games of the series in Memphis developed similarly but ended in different results. In Game 3, the Thunder surrendered a 16-point lead late in the third quarter, with the Grizzlies eventually tying the game in regulation and winning the game in overtime. In Game 4, the Thunder allowed Memphis to come back from a 10-point deficit with 5:25 remaining; afterward, the Thunder were unable to convert last-second shots in regulation and each of the first two overtime periods, before eventually pulling out a 133–123 win in triple overtime. Fatigue from this contest appeared to effect the Grizzlies in Game 5, who were limited to just 36% shooting in a runaway 99-72 Thunder victory. Oklahoma City led by 19 points at the end of the third quarter, allowing the team to rest most of its starters for the final period. The rest did not benefit the Thunder in Game 6, however, in which Kevin Durant was limited to just 11 points; by contrast, Memphis' Zach Randolph scored 30 points en route to a 95-83 Memphis victory, forcing a decisive Game 7 in Oklahoma City. The Thunder were able to clinch the playoff series in Game 7, however, benefitting from a 39-point performance from Durant as well as a triple-double performance by Westbrook.

==== Conference finals ====
The Western Conference finals pitted the Thunder against the Dallas Mavericks, who had previously swept the defending champion Los Angeles Lakers in four games, allowing the Mavericks the advantage of eight days rest heading into the series. Game 1 of the conference finals saw the Thunder accumulate as much as a nine-point lead in the third quarter, but ultimately collapse under the pressure of a 48-point performance by Mavericks forward Dirk Nowitzki and timely three-point shooting by reserve guard J.J. Barea. Nowitzki's performance included an NBA-record for consecutive free throws in a game; he was a perfect 24-for-24 from the line. Oklahoma City evened the series in Game 2, where the Thunder bench scored 50 points and played much of the decisive fourth quarter. In Game 3, Dallas' defensive effort forced 14 turnovers by the Thunder, eventually opening up a 23-point Dallas lead before holding off a late Thunder charge in a 93–87 win. Game 4 unfolded positively for the Thunder through most of the contest, with the team enjoying a 15-point advantage with 4:49 remaining in the fourth quarter, having built on a large statistical lead in rebounds, assists, blocks, and points in the paint. However, the Thunder suffered from 25 turnovers in the contest, and their offense evaporated in the final five minutes, shooting 1-10 from the field, as Dallas went on a 17–2 run to tie the game in regulation, 101-101. The Mavericks eventually won the game in overtime, 112–105, sending the Thunder back to Dallas down 3–1 in the series. The Thunder season then came to an end on May 25, 2011, in a hard-fought loss at Dallas, 100–96.

==== Promotion and media news ====
The Thunder's 2011 playoff appearances generated several new records for television ratings of individual Thunder games within the OKC market. Prior to 2011, the highest-rated Thunder game had been Game 6 against the Lakers in the 2010 playoffs (generating a cumulative 21.4 rating in OKC households among two broadcasts). In 2011, Game 6 of the Memphis series generated a 22.5 share; Game 7 generated a 23.4 share; Game 5 generated a 24.0 share; and Game 1 of the Mavericks series generated a 24.8 share.

During the 2011 NBA Playoffs, Kevin Durant was featured in national television commercials for Gatorade's "G-Series" sports drink line, with one such commercial incorporating teammates Nate Robinson, Nick Collison, Cole Aldrich and Royal Ivey.

=== Recap ===
Despite a frustrating series against the Dallas Mavericks to end the season, community spirit surrounding the Thunder remained high after the season. An estimated 500 fans greeted the team's private charter flight as it arrived in Oklahoma City at 1:00 a.m. the night of the Thunder's final loss.

After the conclusion of the season, several Thunder players appeared at three different youth camps hosted by the team at various locations around the OKC area in June, until the NBA lockout prohibited players from appearing at Thunder camps after June 30. Kevin Durant hosted his own camp from June 29–30 in OKC, and from July 1–2 in Austin, Texas.

== Roster ==
Oklahoma City Thunder roster
Players

Pos.	No.	Player	Height	Weight	DOB	From
C	45	Cole Aldrich	6 ft 11 in (2.11 m)	245 lb (111 kg)	1988–10–31	Kansas
PF	4	Nick Collison	6 ft 10 in (2.08 m)	255 lb (116 kg)	1980–10–26	Kansas
SG	14	Daequan Cook	6 ft 5 in (1.96 m)	210 lb (95 kg)	1987–04–28	Ohio State
SF	35	Kevin Durant	6 ft 9 in (2.06 m)	230 lb (104 kg)	1988–09–29	Texas
SG	13	James Harden	6 ft 5 in (1.96 m)	220 lb (100 kg)	1989–05–26	Arizona State
PF	9	Serge Ibaka	6 ft 10 in (2.08 m)	265 lb (120 kg)	1989–09–18	Republic of the Congo
PG	7	Royal Ivey	6 ft 4 in (1.93 m)	215 lb (98 kg)	1981–12–20	Texas
PG	6	Eric Maynor	6 ft 3 in (1.91 m)	175 lb (79 kg)	1987–06–11	VCU
C	8	Nazr Mohammed	6 ft 11 in (2.11 m)	250 lb (113 kg)	1977–09–05	Kentucky
C	23	Byron Mullens	7 ft 0 in (2.13 m)	275 lb (125 kg)	1989–02–14	Ohio State
C	5	Kendrick Perkins	6 ft 11 in (2.11 m)	280 lb (127 kg)	1984–11–10	Clifton J. Ozen HS (TX)
PG	3	Nate Robinson	5 ft 9 in (1.75 m)	180 lb (82 kg)	1984–05–31	Washington
SG	2	Thabo Sefolosha	6 ft 7 in (2.01 m)	215 lb (98 kg)	1984–05–02	Switzerland
PG	0	Russell Westbrook	6 ft 3 in (1.91 m)	187 lb (85 kg)	1988–11–12	UCLA

Coaches
Head coach
- (United States) Scott Brooks (UC Irvine)
Assistant(s)
- (United States) Mark Bryant (Seton Hall)
- (United States) Maurice Cheeks (West Texas A&M)
- (United States) Rex Kalamian (Cal Poly Pomona)
- (United States) Brian Keefe (UNLV)
- (Jordan) Maz Trakh (Southern Utah)

Legend
- (DP) Unsigned draft pick
- (FA) Free agent
- (S) Suspended
- Injured

Roster

=== Salaries ===
Player	2010–11 Salary
Nick Collison	$13,720,000
Nazr Mohammed	$6,883,800
Kendrick Perkins	$6,446,720
Kevin Durant	$6,053,663
James Harden	$4,304,520
Nate Robinson	$4,200,000
Russell Westbrook	$4,017,720
Thabo Sefolosha	$3,000,000
Daequan Cook	$2,169,856
Cole Aldrich	$2,126,520
Eric Maynor	$1,417,800
Byron Mullens	$1,204,200
Serge Ibaka	$1,204,200
Royal Ivey	$1,069,509
Robert Vaden	$57,884
TOTAL	$57,876,392

Sources:

- HoopsHype: OKC Salaries
- HoopsWorld: OKC Salaries
- ESPN: OKC Roster

== Standings ==
=== Conference ===
#	Western Conference				
#	Team	W	L	PCT	GB
1	c-San Antonio Spurs	61	21	.744	–
2	y-Los Angeles Lakers	57	25	.695	4
3	x-Dallas Mavericks	57	25	.695	4
4	y-Oklahoma City Thunder	55	27	.671	6
5	x-Denver Nuggets	50	32	.610	11
6	x-Portland Trail Blazers	48	34	.585	13
7	x-New Orleans Hornets	46	36	.561	15
8	x-Memphis Grizzlies	46	36	.561	15
9	Houston Rockets	43	39	.524	18
10	Phoenix Suns	40	42	.488	21
11	Utah Jazz	39	43	.476	22
12	Golden State Warriors	36	46	.439	25
13	Los Angeles Clippers	32	50	.390	29
14	Sacramento Kings	24	58	.293	37
15	Minnesota Timberwolves	17	65	.207	44

=== Division ===
Northwest Division	W	L	PCT	GB	Home	Road	Div
y-Oklahoma City Thunder	55	27	.671	–	30–11	25–16	13–3
x-Denver Nuggets	50	32	.610	5	33–8	17–24	9–7
x-Portland Trail Blazers	48	34	.585	7	30–11	18–23	10–6
Utah Jazz	39	43	.476	16	21–20	18–23	7–9
Minnesota Timberwolves	17	65	.207	38	12–29	5–36	1–15

== Game log ==
=== Preseason ===
2010 pre-season game log
Pre-season: 4–3 (home: 2–1; road: 2–2)

Game	Date	Team	Score	High points	High rebounds	High assists	Location Attendance	Record
1	October 6	@ Charlotte	W 97–93	Jeff Green (25)	Serge Ibaka (11)	Russell Westbrook (6)	Cumberland County Crown Coliseum; 7,491	1–0
2	October 8	@ Miami	L 96–103	Kevin Durant (21)	Jeff Green, James Harden (5)	Eric Maynor, Russell Westbrook (6)	Sprint Center; 18,222	1–1
3	October 12	Memphis	L 96–116	James Harden (23)	Serge Ibaka (8)	Royal Ivey (6)	BOK Center; 11,297	1–2
4	October 14	CSKA Moscow	W 97–89	Kevin Durant (20)	Serge Ibaka (6)	Kevin Durant (7)	Oklahoma City Arena; 16,425	2–2
5	October 18	@ San Antonio	W 111–102	Kevin Durant (29)	Kevin Durant, Jeff Green (9)	Russell Westbrook (9)	AT&T Center; 14,627	3–2
6	October 19	@ Denver	L 115–130	Jeff Green (29)	D. J. White (13)	Eric Maynor (6)	Pepsi Center; 13,549	3–3
7	October 21	New Orleans	W 101–86	Kevin Durant (19)	Byron Mullens (9)	Kevin Durant (8)	Oklahoma City Arena; 16,541	4–3

2010–11 season schedule

=== Regular season ===
2010–11 game log
Total: 55–27 (home: 30–11; road: 25–16)
October: 2–1 (home: 1–1; road: 1–0)

Game	Date	Team	Score	High points	High rebounds	High assists	Location Attendance	Record
1	October 27	Chicago	W 106–95	Kevin Durant (30)	Russell Westbrook (10)	Russell Westbrook (6)	Oklahoma City Arena; 18,203	1–0
2	October 29	@ Detroit	W 105–104	Kevin Durant (30)	Serge Ibaka (10)	Russell Westbrook (11)	The Palace of Auburn Hills; 22,076	2–0
3	October 31	Utah	L 99–120	Kevin Durant (28)	Jeff Green (9)	Russell Westbrook (5)	Oklahoma City Arena; 18,203	2–1

November : 10–5 (home: 5–3; road: 5–2)

Game	Date	Team	Score	High points	High rebounds	High assists	Location Attendance	Record
4	November 3	@ L.A. Clippers	L 92–107	Jeff Green (19)	Jeff Green, Nenad Krstić (9)	Russell Westbrook (6)	Staples Center; 18,414	2–2
5	November 4	@ Portland	W 107–106 (OT)	Kevin Durant, Russell Westbrook (28)	Kevin Durant, Russell Westbrook (11)	Russell Westbrook (5)	Rose Garden; 20,611	3–2
6	November 7	Boston	L 83–92	Kevin Durant (34)	Serge Ibaka (11)	Russell Westbrook (10)	Oklahoma City Arena; 18,203	3–3
7	November 10	Philadelphia	W 109–103	Kevin Durant, Russell Westbrook (31)	Kevin Durant, Serge Ibaka (7)	Russell Westbrook (12)	Oklahoma City Arena; 18,203	4–3
8	November 12	Portland	W 110–108	Russell Westbrook (36)	Serge Ibaka, Russell Westbrook (7)	Russell Westbrook (7)	Oklahoma City Arena; 18,203	5–3
9	November 14	San Antonio	L 104–117	Kevin Durant (23)	Kevin Durant (7)	Russell Westbrook (8)	Oklahoma City Arena; 18,203	5–4
10	November 15	@ Utah	W 115–108	Kevin Durant (30)	Serge Ibaka (11)	Russell Westbrook (7)	EnergySolutions Arena; 19,911	6–4
11	November 17	Houston	W 116–99	Kevin Durant (24)	Serge Ibaka (8)	Russell Westbrook (12)	Oklahoma City Arena; 17,509	7–4
12	November 19	@ Boston	W 89–84	Russell Westbrook (31)	Serge Ibaka, Thabo Sefolosha (7)	Russell Westbrook (6)	TD Garden; 18,624	8–4
13	November 20	@ Milwaukee	W 82–81	James Harden (23)	James Harden (9)	Russell Westbrook (6)	Bradley Center; 16,975	9–4
14	November 22	Minnesota	W 117–107	Kevin Durant (28)	Thabo Sefolosha (11)	Russell Westbrook (14)	Oklahoma City Arena; 17,653	10–4
15	November 24	Dallas	L 103–111	Kevin Durant (32)	Kevin Durant (11)	Russell Westbrook (10)	Oklahoma City Arena; 18,203	10–5
16	November 26	@ Indiana	W 110–106 (OT)	Russell Westbrook (43)	Jeff Green (14)	Russell Westbrook (8)	Conseco Fieldhouse; 17,155	11–5
17	November 28	@ Houston	L 98–99	Russell Westbrook (23)	Serge Ibaka (8)	Russell Westbrook (10)	Toyota Center; 15,316	11–6
18	November 29	New Orleans	W 95–89	Kevin Durant (26)	Kevin Durant, Serge Ibaka (11)	Russell Westbrook (11)	Oklahoma City Arena; 18,203	12–6

December : 11–5 (home: 7–2; road: 4–3)

Game	Date	Team	Score	High points	High rebounds	High assists	Location Attendance	Record
19	December 1	@ New Jersey	W 123–120 (3OT)	Russell Westbrook (38)	Russell Westbrook (15)	Russell Westbrook (9)	Prudential Center; 13,108	13–6
20	December 3	@ Toronto	L 99–111	James Harden, Russell Westbrook (20)	Thabo Sefolosha (7)	Jeff Green, Russell Westbrook (7)	Air Canada Centre; 16,774	13–7
21	December 5	Golden State	W 114–109	Kevin Durant (28)	Jeff Green, Serge Ibaka (8)	Russell Westbrook (13)	Oklahoma City Arena; 18,203	14–7
22	December 6	@ Chicago	L 90–99	Kevin Durant (29)	Thabo Sefolosha (8)	Russell Westbrook (7)	United Center; 21,184	14–8
23	December 8	@ Minnesota	W 111–103	Kevin Durant (30)	Kevin Durant (11)	Russell Westbrook (8)	Target Center; 13,907	15–8
24	December 10	@ New Orleans	W 97–92	Russell Westbrook (29)	Serge Ibaka (9)	Russell Westbrook (10)	New Orleans Arena; 14,428	16–8
25	December 12	Cleveland	W 106–77	Kevin Durant (25)	Nick Collison (8)	Russell Westbrook (11)	Oklahoma City Arena; 18,203	17–8
26	December 15	Houston	W 117–105	Kevin Durant (32)	Thabo Sefolosha (9)	Jeff Green, Russell Westbrook (5)	Oklahoma City Arena; 17,997	18–8
27	December 17	Sacramento	W 102–87	Kevin Durant (24)	Serge Ibaka (10)	Russell Westbrook (6)	Oklahoma City Arena; 18,203	19–8
28	December 19	Phoenix	L 110–113	Kevin Durant (28)	Nick Collison (8)	Russell Westbrook (9)	Oklahoma City Arena; 18,203	19–9
29	December 21	@ Charlotte	W 99–81	Kevin Durant (32)	Nick Collison (10)	Jeff Green (5)	Time Warner Cable Arena; 16,876	20–9
30	December 22	@ New York	L 98–112	Kevin Durant (26)	Serge Ibaka, Thabo Sefolosha (8)	Russell Westbrook (5)	Madison Square Garden; 19,763	20–10
31	December 25	Denver	W 114–106	Kevin Durant (44)	Nenad Krstić (8)	Jeff Green (6)	Oklahoma City Arena; 18,203	21–10
32	December 27	Dallas	L 93–103	Kevin Durant (28)	Serge Ibaka (9)	Russell Westbrook (7)	Oklahoma City Arena; 18,203	21–11
33	December 29	New Jersey	W 114–93	Kevin Durant (27)	Thabo Sefolosha (8)	Eric Maynor, Russell Westbrook (7)	Oklahoma City Arena; 18,203	22–11
34	December 31	Atlanta	W 103–94	Kevin Durant (33)	Serge Ibaka, Russell Westbrook (10)	Russell Westbrook (10)	Oklahoma City Arena; 18,203	23–11

January : 7–6 (home: 4–1; road: 3–5)

Game	Date	Team	Score	High points	High rebounds	High assists	Location Attendance	Record
35	January 1	@ San Antonio	L 74–101	Kevin Durant (16)	Serge Ibaka (13)	Thabo Sefolosha (3)	AT&T Center; 18,581	23–12
36	January 4	@ Memphis	L 105–110	Kevin Durant, Russell Westbrook (28)	Kevin Durant (9)	Russell Westbrook (7)	FedEx Forum; 12,765	23–13
37	January 6	@ Dallas	W 99–95	Kevin Durant (28)	Jeff Green, Nenad Krstić (9)	Russell Westbrook (9)	American Airlines Center; 20,282	24–13
38	January 8	Memphis	W 109–100	Kevin Durant (40)	Kevin Durant (8)	Russell Westbrook (11)	Oklahoma City Arena; 18,203	25–13
39	January 12	@ Houston	W 118–112	Kevin Durant (30)	Thabo Sefolosha (13)	Russell Westbrook (13)	Toyota Center; 16,158	26–13
40	January 13	Orlando	W 125–124	Kevin Durant (36)	Nenad Krstić (11)	Russell Westbrook (13)	Oklahoma City Arena; 18,203	27–13
41	January 17	@ L.A. Lakers	L 94–101	Russell Westbrook (32)	Serge Ibaka (10)	Russell Westbrook (12)	Staples Center; 18,997	27–14
42	January 19	@ Denver	L 107–112	Russell Westbrook (28)	Nick Collison, Serge Ibaka (9)	Russell Westbrook (10)	Pepsi Center; 16,872	27–15
43	January 22	New York	W 101–98	Kevin Durant (30)	Serge Ibaka (15)	Russell Westbrook (5)	Oklahoma City Arena; 18,203	28–15
44	January 24	@ New Orleans	L 89–91	Kevin Durant (22)	Serge Ibaka (10)	Russell Westbrook (10)	New Orleans Arena; 17,233	28–16
45	January 26	@ Minnesota	W 118–117 (OT)	Kevin Durant (47)	Kevin Durant (18)	Russell Westbrook (8)	Target Center; 14,979	29–16
46	January 28	Washington	W 124–117 (2OT)	Kevin Durant (40)	Russell Westbrook (13)	Russell Westbrook (13)	Oklahoma City Arena; 18,203	30–16
47	January 30	Miami	L 103–108	Kevin Durant (33)	Jeff Green (11)	Russell Westbrook (10)	Oklahoma City Arena; 18,203	30–17

February : 6–5 (home: 3–2; road: 3–3)

Game	Date	Team	Score	High points	High rebounds	High assists	Location Attendance	Record
48	February 2	New Orleans	W 104–93	Kevin Durant (43)	Serge Ibaka (12)	Russell Westbrook (8)	Oklahoma City Arena; 17,849	31–17
49	February 4	@ Phoenix	W 111–107	Jeff Green (28)	Kevin Durant (11)	Russell Westbrook (11)	US Airways Center; 16,274	32–17
50	February 5	@ Utah	W 121–105	Russell Westbrook (33)	Kevin Durant (12)	Russell Westbrook (10)	EnergySolutions Arena; 19,711	33–17
51	February 8	Memphis	L 101–105 (OT)	Kevin Durant (31)	Serge Ibaka (14)	Russell Westbrook (11)	Oklahoma City Arena; 17,868	33–18
52	February 12	@ Sacramento	W 99–97	Kevin Durant (35)	Kevin Durant, Serge Ibaka (6)	Russell Westbrook (7)	ARCO Arena; 14,987	34–18
53	February 13	@ Golden State	L 94–100	Kevin Durant (29)	Nick Collison (10)	Russell Westbrook (5)	Oracle Arena; 19,596	34–19
54	February 15	Sacramento	W 126–96	Daequan Cook (20)	Serge Ibaka (9)	Russell Westbrook (11)	Oklahoma City Arena; 18,087	35–19
All-Star Break
55	February 22	L.A. Clippers	W 111–88	Jeff Green (22)	Serge Ibaka (10)	Russell Westbrook (7)	Oklahoma City Arena; 18,203	36–19
56	February 23	@ San Antonio	L 105–109	Kevin Durant (30)	Serge Ibaka (15)	Russell Westbrook (7)	AT&T Center; 18,581	36–20
57	February 25	@ Orlando	L 88–111	Kevin Durant (23)	Kevin Durant (16)	Eric Maynor (7)	Amway Center; 19,011	36–21
58	February 27	L.A. Lakers	L 87–90	Russell Westbrook (22)	Serge Ibaka (13)	Russell Westbrook (6)	Oklahoma City Arena; 18,203	36–22

March : 13–2 (home: 8–1; road: 5–1)

Game	Date	Team	Score	High points	High rebounds	High assists	Location Attendance	Record
59	March 2	Indiana	W 113–89	Kevin Durant, Russell Westbrook (21)	Serge Ibaka (12)	Russell Westbrook (9)	Oklahoma City Arena; 18,203	37–22
60	March 4	@ Atlanta	W 111–104	Kevin Durant (29)	Kevin Durant (8)	Russell Westbrook (9)	Philips Arena; 17,916	38–22
61	March 6	Phoenix	W 122–118 (OT)	Russell Westbrook (32)	Nick Collison, Thabo Sefolosha (9)	Russell Westbrook (11)	Oklahoma City Arena; 18,203	39–22
62	March 7	@ Memphis	L 101–107	Russell Westbrook (27)	Kevin Durant, James Harden, Serge Ibaka (6)	Russell Westbrook (7)	FedExForum; 13,903	39–23
63	March 9	@ Philadelphia	W 110–105 (OT)	Kevin Durant (34)	Kevin Durant (16)	Russell Westbrook (12)	Wells Fargo Center; 19,283	40–23
64	March 11	Detroit	W 104–94	Kevin Durant (24)	Kevin Durant (9)	Russell Westbrook (11)	Oklahoma City Arena; 18,203	41–23
65	March 13	@ Cleveland	W 95–75	Russell Westbrook (20)	Serge Ibaka (14)	Eric Maynor (8)	Quicken Loans Arena; 19,811	42–23
66	March 14	@ Washington	W 116–89	Kevin Durant (32)	Kendrick Perkins (9)	Russell Westbrook (12)	Verizon Center; 17,921	43–23
67	March 16	@ Miami	W 96–85	Kevin Durant (29)	Serge Ibaka (12)	Kevin Durant (6)	American Airlines Arena; 20,083	44–23
68	March 18	Charlotte	W 99–82	Kevin Durant (25)	Serge Ibaka (13)	Russell Westbrook (7)	Oklahoma City Arena; 18,203	45–23
69	March 20	Toronto	L 93–95	James Harden (23)	Kendrick Perkins (12)	James Harden, Kendrick Perkins, Russell Westbrook (4)	Oklahoma City Arena; 18,203	45–24
70	March 23	Utah	W 106–94	Russell Westbrook (31)	Serge Ibaka (13)	Russell Westbrook (5)	Oklahoma City Arena; 18,203	46–24
71	March 25	Minnesota	W 111–103	Kevin Durant (23)	Serge Ibaka (10)	Russell Westbrook (8)	Oklahoma City Arena; 18,203	47–24
72	March 27	Portland	W 99–90	Russell Westbrook (28)	Kendrick Perkins (10)	Russell Westbrook (7)	Oklahoma City Arena; 18,203	48–24
73	March 29	Golden State	W 115–114 (OT)	Kevin Durant (39)	Kendrick Perkins (13)	Russell Westbrook (9)	Oklahoma City Arena; 18,203	49–24
74	March 30	@ Phoenix	W 116–98	Kevin Durant, James Harden (22)	Serge Ibaka (10)	Russell Westbrook (8)	US Airways Center; 18,033	50–24

April : 5–3 (home: 2–1; road: 3–2)

Game	Date	Team	Score	High points	High rebounds	High assists	Location Attendance	Record
75	April 1	@ Portland	L 91–98	Kevin Durant (25)	Kevin Durant (11)	Russell Westbrook (6)	Rose Garden; 20,709	50–25
76	April 2	@ L.A. Clippers	L 92–98	Kevin Durant (23)	Nazr Mohammed (10)	Russell Westbrook (8)	Staples Center; 19,060	50–26
77	April 5	@ Denver	W 101–94	Kevin Durant (32)	Kendrick Perkins (14)	Russell Westbrook (6)	Pepsi Center; 18,203	51–26
78	April 6	L.A. Clippers	W 112–108	Kevin Durant (29)	Kendrick Perkins (17)	Russell Westbrook (7)	Oklahoma City Arena; 18,203	52–26
79	April 8	Denver	W 104–89	Kevin Durant (28)	Nick Collison (8)	Russell Westbrook (8)	Oklahoma City Arena; 18,203	53–26
80	April 10	@ L.A. Lakers	W 120–106	Kevin Durant (31)	Russell Westbrook (6)	Russell Westbrook (7)	Staples Center; 18,997	54–26
81	April 11	@ Sacramento	W 120–112	Kevin Durant (32)	Kevin Durant, Serge Ibaka (8)	Russell Westbrook (9)	Power Balance Pavilion; 15,683	55–26
82	April 13	Milwaukee	L 106–110 (OT)	Russell Westbrook (20)	Nazr Mohammed (10)	James Harden, Russell Westbrook (5)	Oklahoma City Arena; 18,203	55–27

2010–11 season schedule

=== Playoffs ===
2011 playoff game log
First Round: 4–1 (home: 3–0; road: 1–1)

Game	Date	Team	Score	High points	High rebounds	High assists	Location Attendance	Record
1	April 17	Denver	W 107–103	Kevin Durant (41)	Kevin Durant (9)	Russell Westbrook (7)	Oklahoma City Arena; 18,203	1–0
2	April 20	Denver	W 106–89	Kevin Durant (23)	Serge Ibaka (12)	Russell Westbrook (7)	Oklahoma City Arena; 18,203	2–0
3	April 23	@ Denver	W 97–94	Kevin Durant (26)	Serge Ibaka (16)	Russell Westbrook (8)	Pepsi Center; 19,958	3–0
4	April 25	@ Denver	L 101–104	Kevin Durant (31)	Serge Ibaka (14)	James Harden, Russell Westbrook (5)	Pepsi Center; 19,155	3–1
5	April 27	Denver	W 100–97	Kevin Durant (41)	Kendrick Perkins (9)	Russell Westbrook (4)	Oklahoma City Arena; 18,203	4–1

Conference Semifinals: 4–3 (home: 3–1; road: 1–2)

Game	Date	Team	Score	High points	High rebounds	High assists	Location Attendance	Series
1	May 1	Memphis	L 101–114	Kevin Durant (33)	Kevin Durant, Serge Ibaka (11)	Russell Westbrook (6)	Oklahoma City Arena; 18,203	0–1
2	May 3	Memphis	W 111–102	Kevin Durant (26)	Nick Collison (7)	Russell Westbrook (6)	Oklahoma City Arena; 18,203	1–1
3	May 7	@ Memphis	L 93–101 (OT)	Russell Westbrook (23)	Kendrick Perkins (13)	Russell Westbrook (12)	FedExForum; 18,119	1–2
4	May 9	@ Memphis	W 133–123 (3OT)	Russell Westbrook (40)	Kevin Durant (13)	James Harden (7)	FedExForum; 18,119	2–2
5	May 11	Memphis	W 99–72	Kevin Durant (19)	Nick Collison (10)	Eric Maynor (9)	Oklahoma City Arena; 18,203	3–2
6	May 13	@ Memphis	L 83–95	Russell Westbrook (27)	Kevin Durant, Kendrick Perkins (7)	James Harden (5)	FedExForum; 18,119	3–3
7	May 15	Memphis	W 105–90	Kevin Durant (39)	Nick Collison (12)	Russell Westbrook (14)	Oklahoma City Arena; 18,203	4–3

Conference Finals: 1–4 (home: 0–2; road: 1–2)

Game	Date	Team	Score	High points	High rebounds	High assists	Location Attendance	Series
1	May 17	@ Dallas	L 112–121	Kevin Durant (40)	Kevin Durant (8)	Kevin Durant (5)	American Airlines Center; 20,911	0–1
2	May 19	@ Dallas	W 106–100	Kevin Durant (24)	Nick Collison, James Harden (7)	Kevin Durant, James Harden, Russell Westbrook (4)	American Airlines Center; 21,051	1–1
3	May 21	Dallas	L 87–93	Russell Westbrook (30)	Kevin Durant (12)	Kevin Durant (5)	Oklahoma City Arena; 18,203	1–2
4	May 23	Dallas	L 105–112 (OT)	Kevin Durant (29)	Kevin Durant (15)	Russell Westbrook (8)	Oklahoma City Arena; 18,203	1–3
5	May 25	@ Dallas	L 96–100	Russell Westbrook (31)	Nick Collison (12)	James Harden (6)	American Airlines Center; 21,092	1–4

2011 playoff schedule

== Player statistics ==
Legend
GP	Games played	GS	Games started	MPG	Minutes per game
FG%	Field-goal percentage	3P%	3-point field-goal percentage	FT%	Free-throw percentage
RPG	Rebounds per game	APG	Assists per game	SPG	Steals per game
BPG	Blocks per game	PPG	Points per game

=== Regular season ===
Player	GP	GS	MPG	FG%	3P%	FT%	RPG	APG	SPG	BPG	PPG
Cole Aldrich	18	0	7.9	.533	.0	.500	1.9	.2	.28	.39	1.0
Nick Collison	71	2	21.5	.566	.0	.753	4.5	1.0	.59	.44	4.6
Daequan Cook	43	0	13.9	.436	.422	.800	1.7	.55	.33	.02	5.6
Kevin Durant	78	78	38.9	.462	.350	.880	6.8	2.7	1.13	0.97	27.7
Jeff Green*	49	49	37.0	.437	.304	.818	5.6	1.8	.8	.4	15.2
James Harden	82	5	26.7	.436	.349	.843	3.1	2.1	1.12	.29	12.2
Serge Ibaka	82	44	27.0	.543	.0	.750	7.6	0.3	.38	2.41	9.9
Royal Ivey	25	0	6.2	.421	.438	1.0	.6	.3	.24	.04	1.6
Nenad Krstić*	47	47	21.7	.498	.0	.803	4.4	.4	.4	.4	7.6
Eric Maynor	82	0	14.6	.402	.385	.729	1.5	2.9	.4	.1	4.2
Nazr Mohammed*	24	7	17.9	.573	.0	.625	4.8	0.3	.7	.4	6.9
Byron Mullens	13	0	6.5	.321	.0	.500	1.8	.0	.2	.2	1.9
Kendrick Perkins*	17	17	25.2	.493	.000	.531	7.9	.9	.4	.9	5.1
Morris Peterson*	4	0	5.8	.400	.000	.0	.8	.3	.0	.0	1.0
Nate Robinson*	4	0	7.5	.267	.250	.750	.3	1.5	.0	.0	3.3
Thabo Sefolosha	79	79	25.9	.471	.275	.747	4.4	1.4	1.2	.5	5.1
Russell Westbrook	82	82	34.7	.442	.330	.842	4.6	8.2	1.9	.4	21.9
D.J. White*	23	0	9.5	.462	.0	.500	2.3	.2	.3	.3	2.8

Led team

* – Stats with Thunder (partial season)

Sources: OKC Thunder 2010–11 Statistics

=== Playoffs ===
Player	GP	GS	MPG	FG%	3P%	FT%	RPG	APG	SPG	BPG	PPG
Nick Collison	17	0	24.3	.632	.0	.783	5.8	.9	.88	.88	6.7
Daequan Cook	17	0	11.5	.393	.348	1.000	1.6	.1	.18	.0	3.8
Kevin Durant	17	17	42.5	.449	.339	.838	8.2	2.8	.94	1.12	28.6
James Harden	17	0	31.6	.475	.303	.825	5.4	3.6	1.24	.76	13.0
Serge Ibaka	17	17	28.8	.462	.0	.825	7.3	0.2	.24	3.06	9.8
Royal Ivey	2	0	3.0	1.000	1.000	.0	.5	.5	.0	.0	3.0
Eric Maynor	17	0	12.9	.377	.36	.789	1.3	2.2	.53	.0	4.8
Nazr Mohammed	14	0	10.6	.412	.0	.400	2.3	.0	.29	.43	2.3
Kendrick Perkins	17	17	28.2	.453	.0	.576	6.1	.8	.24	.76	4.5
Nate Robinson	3	0	4.0	.286	.333	1.000	.0	.3	.0	.0	2.7
Thabo Sefolosha	17	17	20.2	.463	.154	1.000	3.1	.7	.94	.29	4.6
Russell Westbrook	17	17	37.5	.394	.292	.852	5.4	6.4	1.41	.35	23.8

Led team

Source: OKC Thunder 2011 Playoff Statistics

== Awards, records and milestones ==
=== Awards ===
==== Weekly ====
- Russell Westbrook was named Western Conference Player of the Week for November 15–21.
- Westbrook was named Western Conference Player of the Week for November 29 to December 5.
- Westbrook was named Western Conference Player of the Week for January 10–16.
- Kevin Durant was named Western Conference Player of the Week for January 31 to February 6.
- Westbrook was named Western Conference Player of the Week for February 28 to March 6.
- Durant was named Western Conference Player of the Week for April 4 to April 10.

==== Monthly ====
- Kevin Durant was named Western Conference Player of the Month for December 2010.
- Durant was named Western Conference Player of the Month for April 2011.

==== All-Star ====
- Thunder players Kevin Durant, Jeff Green, Thabo Sefolosha, and Russell Westbrook were designated for placement on the NBA ballot for the 2011 All-Star Game, to be played at the Staples Center in Los Angeles on February 20, 2011.
- On January 27, 2011, Durant was named as a starter to the Western Conference All-Star team, having received 1,736,728 total votes – the most of any forward, and second only to Kobe Bryant in overall voting among Western Conference players. It was Durant's second All-Star appearance overall, and first as a starter. During the game Durant scored 34 points, second-most to Kobe Bryant's 37-point effort. Durant was also named as one of six participants in the All-Star weekend's Three-Point Shooting Contest held the night before the All-Star Game, although he did not advance out of the preliminary round.
- Russell Westbrook was selected as an All-Star team reserve by a vote of the Western Conference coaches. It was his first All-Star appearance. Westbrook scored 12 points in the game. Westbrook was also voted by online fan ballot to participate in the Taco Bell Skills Challenge held the night before the All-Star Game. Westbrook advanced to the finals of the competition, placing second to Stephen Curry.
- Forward Serge Ibaka was named as a first-time participant for the 2011 All-Star Slam Dunk Contest. Durant was assigned as Ibaka's official coach for the competition. Although Ibaka did not advance out of the preliminary round, he made an impression with his two efforts – a running dunk from the free-throw line and a dunk in which he simultaneously grabbed a "Rumble" mascot doll off the rim with his teeth. Ibaka was also named to the Sopohomore Team roster in the T-Mobile Rookie Challenge, in which he registered 14 points and two blocked shots.
- Guard James Harden was also named to the Sophomore Team roster in the T-Mobile Rookie Challenge, as the replacement for Tyreke Evans (unable to compete due to plantar fasciitis). Harden lead the Sophomore team with 30 points, and also recorded two assists.

==== Season ====
- At the close of the regular season, forward Kevin Durant clinched his second-consecutive NBA scoring title, averaging 27.7 points per game. In the process, he surpassed Bob McAdoo as the youngest NBA player to earn two scoring titles.
- On April 20, 2011, Kevin Durant was given the Magic Johnson Award by the Professional Basketball Writers Association, recognizing the combination of Durant's on-court performance and openness with the media during the course of the regular season.
- Kevin Durant received recognition on the All-NBA First Team at the end of the year. Russell Westbrook received recognition on the All-NBA Second Team.

=== Milestones ===
- The Thunder's January 22, 2011, win over the New York Knicks was Scott Brooks' 100th win as an NBA head coach, all with the Thunder.
- During the March 11, 2011, game against Detroit, Russell Westbrook scored the 4,000th point of his NBA career, becoming one of only five players in NBA history to log 4,000 points, 1,500 assists and 1,000 rebounds in their first three years.
- The March 18, 2011, game against Charlotte was Kevin Durant's 300th game in the NBA. Among active players, Durant rates third in points scored during the first 300 games, with 7,760 total points.

== Injuries and surgeries ==
- Center Nenad Krstić underwent surgery on September 21, 2010, to repair a fracture to his right middle finger, suffered in the final game of the FIBA World Championships in Istanbul, Turkey, against Lithuania. His recovery allowed him to see playing time in the Thunder's regular-season debut on October 27, 2010, and subsequent games. Back spasms forced him to sit out games on November 26 and 28, and again from December 10 through December 22. After the January 26 game against Minnesota, Krstić developed a sore right foot which was subsequently aggravated in the February 2 game against New Orleans. Neither condition forced him to miss a start, however.
- Center Nenad Krstić underwent surgery on September 21, 2010, to repair a fracture to his right middle finger, suffered in the final game of the FIBA World Championships in Istanbul, Turkey, against Lithuania. His recovery allowed him to see playing time in the Thunder's regular-season debut on October 27, 2010, and subsequent games. Back spasms forced him to sit out games on November 26 and 28, and again from December 10 through December 22. After the January 26 game against Minnesota, Krstić developed a sore right foot which was subsequently aggravated in the February 2 game against New Orleans. Neither condition forced him to miss a start, however.
- Forward Jeff Green suffered a sprained left ankle in practice on November 6, 2010, forcing his placement on the inactive list for games from November 7 through November 12. After aggravating the injury against the San Antonio Spurs on November 14, Green was withheld from action in games from November 15 through November 20.
- Kevin Durant suffered a left ankle sprain in the game against Houston on November 17, limiting his action in that game and forcing him to sit out subsequent games against Boston on November 19 and Milwaukee on November 20. Durant subsequently sprained his left knee in the fourth quarter of the November 29 game against New Orleans, forcing him onto the inactive list for games on December 1 and 3.
- Rookie Cole Aldrich was sidelined with a left rib contusion for games on December 10 and 12.
- Guard Eric Maynor suffered a sprained right foot on January 1, 2011, but did not miss subsequent game action.
- Guard Thabo Sefolosha suffered a sprained knee after the Thunder's game on January 26, and missed subsequent games through February 2.
- Center Kendrick Perkins suffered a left knee sprain in the final game prior to being traded to the Thunder on February 24, 2011. While separate from the ligament injury to his right knee which kept Perkins out much of the 2010–11 season, the sprain kept Perkins out of the lineup until March 14.
- Point guard Nate Robinson underwent arthroscopic surgery on his right knee on March 4, 2011, after experiencing discomfort following practice on February 28. He is expected to miss 4–6 weeks, which would place his return near the end of the regular season. Robinson was placed back on the active roster for the March 29 game against Golden State, but did not play.
- Forward Serge Ibaka sprained his left ankle in Game 2 of the Memphis Grizzlies playoff series, and re-aggravated the same injury in Game 3. This forced him to miss practice time on May 5, and limited his minutes in subsequent games.

== Transactions ==
=== Overview ===
Players Added

Via trade

- Cole Aldrich
  (Draft rights)
- Daequan Cook
- Morris Peterson

Via free agency

- Royal Ivey
Players Lost

Via free agency

- Mustafa Shakur
- Etan Thomas

Via retirement

- Kevin Ollie

Waived

- Kyle Weaver

=== Trades ===
June 23, 2010	To Oklahoma City Thunder 2010 first-round pick Daequan Cook	To Miami Heat 2010 second-round pick
June 24, 2010	To Oklahoma City Thunder Draft rights to Tibor Pleiss	To Atlanta Hawks Cash considerations
June 24, 2010	To Oklahoma City Thunder Draft rights to Latavious Williams	To Miami Heat Future second-round pick swap
June 24, 2010	To Oklahoma City Thunder Draft rights to Ryan Reid	To Indiana Pacers Draft rights to Magnum Rolle
June 24, 2010	To Oklahoma City Thunder Future first-round pick	To Los Angeles Clippers Draft rights to Eric Bledsoe
July 8, 2010	To Oklahoma City Thunder Draft rights to Cole Aldrich; Morris Peterson	To New Orleans Hornets Draft rights to Craig Brackins; Quincy Pondexter
February 24, 2011	To Oklahoma City Thunder Kendrick Perkins; Nate Robinson	To Boston Celtics Jeff Green; Nenad Krstic; 2012 first-round pick via LAC
February 24, 2011	To Oklahoma City Thunder Nazr Mohammed	To Charlotte Bobcats Morris Peterson; D.J. White

=== Free agency ===
==== Re-signed ====
Date	Player	Contract
July 8, 2010	Kevin Durant	Multi-Year Extension
November 23, 2010	Nick Collison	Multi-Year Extension
March 1, 2011	Kendrick Perkins	Multi-Year Extension

==== Additions ====
Date	Player	Contract	Former team
July 21, 2010	Royal Ivey	Standard	Milwaukee Bucks
April 9, 2011	Robert Vaden	Standard	Tulsa 66ers (D-League)

==== Subtractions ====
Date	Player	Reason left	New team
July 1, 2010	Kevin Ollie	Retirement	N/A
July 1, 2010	Mustafa Shakur	Free agent	Tulsa 66ers (D-League)
July 30, 2010	Kyle Weaver	Free agent	Iowa Energy (D-League)
September 2, 2010	Etan Thomas	Free agent	Atlanta Hawks
