= WRKN (FM) =

Sports radio station in Picayune, Mississippi, serving New Orleans

Coordinates: 30.522°N 90.020°W

- Picayune, Mississippi; United States
- Broadcast area: New Orleans, Louisiana
- Frequency: 106.1 MHz
- Branding: Heaven 106.1

Programming
- Format: Gospel
- Affiliations: Tulane Green Wave

Ownership
- Owner: Cumulus Media; (Radio License Holding CBC, LLC)
- Sister stations: KKND, KMEZ, WZRH

History
- First air date: 1991 (as WZRH)
- Former call signs: WJOJ-FM (1982–1984, CP); WRMH (1984–1989, CP); WZRH (1989–1998); WKSY (1998–2006); WMTI (2006–2015); WZRH (2015–2017)
- Call sign meaning: "We're New Orleans' RocK Ninety Two Point Three FM!" (former format for the current WZRH)

Technical information
- Licensing authority: FCC
- Facility ID: 27951
- Class: C2
- ERP: 28,000 watts
- HAAT: 201 meters (659 ft)

Links
- Public license information: Public file; LMS
- Webcast: Listen live
- Website: heaven1061.com

WRKN (106.1 MHz, "Heaven 106.1") is an urban gospel-formatted FM radio station serving the New Orleans area. The Cumulus Media outlet broadcasts with an ERP of 28 kW, and is licensed to Picayune, Mississippi. Its studios are located on the campus of Delgado Community College in New Orleans and the transmitter site is outside Covington, Louisiana.

== History ==
The station signed on in 1991 as WZRH with a Top 40/Rock format as "Z 106.1, New Orleans' Untamed Radio." However, this station is most remembered for what it became in 1992: 106.1 the Zephyr, with an edgy, alternative rock format.

"The Zephyr" was the first true commercial alternative station in the New Orleans area, and had quite a following. Kenny Vest was the station's program director, and Christian Unruh was the first music director. Scot Fox, Christian "West" Unruh, Grant Morris, Ross "The Ross Man" Shields, Michelle Hinch (Blake), Zach The Roll Model, Wolfgang, Denver Crabb, and Darren Gauthier were some of the more recognizable DJs at the station. The station hosted "Zephyrfest" for a number of years, drawing in thousands of rock revelers to New Orleans' City Park. The station attained very respectable ratings and had a large impact on the local music scene in the nineties.

In 1996, "106.7 The End" was launched. This was the beginning of the end for The Zephyr, as The End cut into their ratings significantly. In 1997, the station was sold to Baton Rouge-based Guaranty Broadcasting. On May 12 of that year, the station was flipped to country as WKSY ("Kiss Country 106.1"). Christian Unruh, banned from the station along with the former staff when the format change was imminent, managed to enter the station an hour before midnight and host the last hour, calling each of the former DJs and letting them each say their goodbyes. The last song played on The Zephyr was "Radio, Radio" by Elvis Costello.

In January 2001, the station flipped to adult contemporary as "Sunny 106.1". After Citadel Broadcasting acquired the station in 2005, they flipped it to "Martini 106.1" on November 15 of that same year, along with the WMTI call letters. Originally, WMTI started with a hybrid Smooth Jazz/Adult Standards format, but evolved back to its previous format by adopting a Soft AC direction in early 2007, putting them in direct competition with rival WLMG.

On December 3, 2007, WMTI flipped to oldies, using the satellite feed from ABC Radio's "True Oldies" format. Citadel merged with Cumulus Media on September 16, 2011.

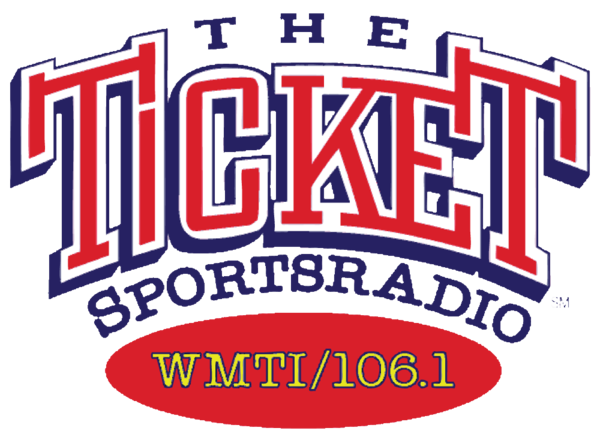
WMTI logo as "The Ticket" (2012–2015)

On January 2, 2012, WMTI changed their format to sports talk, branded as "The Ticket". Most of the station's programming came from CBS Sports Radio. The station had one local afternoon show, The Sports Hangover, hosted by Gus Kattengell. The Ticket hung around for two years, but by the summer of 2015, ratings had dropped precipitously to a 0.7 Nielsen share (still trending up from a 0.0 in the spring ratings.)

On August 26, 2015, WMTI abruptly dropped the sports format in the middle of The Jim Rome Show and began stunting with a loop of "It's the End of the World as We Know It (And I Feel Fine)" by R.E.M. and "The Zephyr Song" by the Red Hot Chili Peppers, telling the audience to listen the following day at 3 PM. At that time, WMTI flipped back to alternative as "106.1 The Underground". The first song under the format was "Good" by Baton Rouge band Better Than Ezra. On September 3, 2015, WMTI changed their call letters to WZRH.

On June 19, 2017, at noon, WZRH swapped formats and call signs with WRKN, as WZRH returned to country, branded as Nash FM 106.1 under the WRKN calls. In November 2018, the station quietly switched to the Nash Icon branding and playlist (and replacing Nash FM's Ty, Kelly & Chuck and Nash Nights Live with syndicated airstaff from WestwoodOne's Nash Icon network).

On March 1, 2024, WRKN changed their format from country back to sports, becoming "106.1 The Ticket" again.

On March 18, 2025, WRKN swapped formats with KKND.
