= KKND (FM) =

Radio station in Port Sulphur–New Orleans, Louisiana

Coordinates: 29.809°N 89.762°W

- Port Sulphur, Louisiana; United States
- Broadcast area: New Orleans metropolitan area
- Frequency: 106.7 MHz
- Branding: 106.7 The Ticket

Programming
- Format: Sports
- Affiliations: Fox Sports Radio; Tulane Green Wave; UNO Privateers

Ownership
- Owner: Cumulus Media; (Radio License Holding CBC, LLC)
- Sister stations: KMEZ, WRKN, WZRH

History
- First air date: July 4, 1989 (as KQLD)
- Former call signs: KQLD (1989–1993); KGTR (1993–1994); KLJZ (1994–1996); KKND (1996–2008); KXOS (2008); KMEZ (2008–2018)
- Call sign meaning: KK The END (former branding)

Technical information
- Licensing authority: FCC
- Facility ID: 58395
- Class: C1
- ERP: 98,000 watts 100,000 with beam tilt
- HAAT: 299 meters (981 ft)

Links
- Public license information: Public file; LMS
- Webcast: Listen live
- Website: theticket1067.com

KKND (106.7 MHz) is a commercial FM radio station licensed to Port Sulphur, Louisiana, and serving the New Orleans metropolitan area. The Cumulus Media station airs a sports radio format. The studio is located on the campus of Delgado Community College in New Orleans.

The transmitter site is on Delacroix Highway (Route 300) in St. Bernard, Louisiana. The effective radiated power (ERP) is 98,000 watts (100,000 with beam tilt).

== History ==
The station began broadcasting on July 4, 1989 as oldies KQLD. In 1993, it flipped to country music as KGTR, 106.7 The Gator. In 1994, the station flipped to smooth jazz as KLJZ. In September 1996, the station flipped to modern rock as 106.7 The End, introducing its current KKND calls. The station added the Howard Stern show in January 1997, and eventually dropped it in December 1999.

In August 2005, KKND was knocked off the air by Hurricane Katrina. On January 8, 2006, KKND returned to air with a new hybrid country/rock format, Rockin' Country 106.7. In early-2007, the station dropped this hybrid format and shifted to a more conventional country format, later rebranding on December 26 as 106.7 The Wolf.

On May 20, 2008, KKND flipped to urban adult contemporary as Old School 106.7, assuming the format of sister station KMEZ. The two stations simulcasted until July 3, when KMEZ flipped to rhythmic contemporary as Power 102.9. KKND's calls were also moved to 102.9, being briefly replaced by KXOS before switching to KMEZ itself.

On December 6, 2018, the two stations began to simulcast once more, this time to migrate the urban AC format back to 102.9 (with the KKND calls also returning to 106.7). Cumulus stated that the simulcast would last for 30 days, after which KKND would launch a new format. On January 3, 2019, KKND flipped to classic hits as 106.7 The Krewe, adding John McConnell's The Spud Show for mornings.

On September 8, 2020, KKND flipped to hot adult contemporary, maintaining the Krewe branding, and replacing McConnell with the syndicated The Bert Show.

On September 10, 2021, KKND changed their format to urban gospel, branded as "Heaven 106.7". The change came after the station had briefly gone off air, along with the rest of their sister stations, after their transmitter had been destroyed in the midst of Hurricane Ida three weeks prior. The change also came after the station, despite the move to Hot AC, barely registered in the local Nielsen Audio Ratings, carrying just a 0.3 share of the market in the July 2021 ratings.

On March 18, 2025, KKND swapped formats with sister station WRKN.
