= WZRH =

Alternative rock radio station in LaPlace, Louisiana, United States

- LaPlace, Louisiana; United States
- Broadcast area: New Orleans metropolitan area
- Frequency: 92.3 MHz (HD Radio)
- Branding: Alt 92-3

Programming
- Format: Alternative rock

Ownership
- Owner: Cumulus Media; (Radio License Holding CBC, LLC)
- Sister stations: KKND, KMEZ, WRKN

History
- First air date: January 10, 1966
- Former call signs: WCKW-FM (1966–2004); WDVW (2004–2010); WRKN (2010–2017)
- Call sign meaning: Zephyr, former branding of the current WRKN

Technical information
- Licensing authority: FCC
- Facility ID: 117
- Class: C1
- ERP: 100,000 watts
- HAAT: 130 meters (430 ft)
- Transmitter coordinates: 29.953°N 90.724°W

Links
- Public license information: Public file; LMS
- Webcast: Listen live
- Website: alt923.com

WZRH (92.3 FM, "Alt 92-3") is a commercial radio station licensed to LaPlace, Louisiana, United States, and serving the greater New Orleans metropolitan area. Owned by Cumulus Media, it airs an alternative rock format and is owned by Cumulus Media, with studios on the campus of Delgado Community College in New Orleans.

WZRH's transmitter is sited on East Airline Highway (U.S. Route 61) in LaPlace. WZRH is authorized to broadcast in HD Radio, with plans to air a variety hits format on its HD2 subchannel.

== History ==
=== 1966-2004: WCKW ===
The station signed on the air on January 10, 1966, as WCKW. It was a stand-alone FM station, not attached to an AM or TV station. In its early years, it was an affiliate of the ABC Information Network.

During the first 29 years of its existence, it tried several formats including country, classic rock, active rock, all-1980s hits and adult Top 40. There were two attempts at adult contemporary music, including a rebrand from "The Point" to "Lite 92.3" on November 4, 2003.

=== 2004-2007: Diva WDVW ===
On November 18, 2004, WCKW unveiled the "Diva" format and changed its call letters to WDVW. The new format consisted of mostly rhythmic pop, classic Disco and Dance music from the 1970s, 1980s, and 1990s. From 2005 to 2007, WDVW was also a reporter to the Billboard magazine Dance/Mix Show Airplay panel.

When it debuted with the format, its slogan was "Music For The Diva In You". "Diva" was a reference to the female audience it targeted and the high number of female artists on its playlist, but despite the name and slogan, it attracted some male listeners as well. In September 2005, WDVW shortly rebranded its slogan to "New Orleans' New #1 Feel Good Station!” in an attempt to bring music and normality back to the area following Hurricane Katrina. WDVW was also the first radio station in the market to resume playing music after emergency information programming had ended.

WDVW was one of two "Divas" in Louisiana along with its sister station in Baton Rouge, WCDV-FM, which returned to an adult contemporary sound on September 18, 2006, therefore making WDVW the last station with a "Diva" format operating within the state.

former "Mix 92.3" logo

=== 2007-2010: Adult top 40 ===
On December 20, 2007, WDVW switched directions to adult top 40 and rebranded as "Mix 92.3." The station dropped most of the Dance music on its playlist in favor of Hot AC music, and also featured recurrents from the 1980s and 1990s along with its modern-leaning playlist. However, the station struggled to find an audience, alike numerous other Hot AC stations that had once attempted to reach into the New Orleans radio market.

=== 2010-2014: Rock ===
On July 23, 2010, at 2:50 p.m., after playing "Need You Now" by Lady Antebellum, the station began stunting by playing Mardi Gras-themed music. At 4:00 p.m., the station became "Rock 92-3," using the slogan "New Orleans' Rock Station" and switched its call sign to WRKN. The first song on "Rock 92-3" was "Check My Brain" by Alice in Chains. The move to a rock format was driven by the recent format change of KOBW-FM, which had aired a similar format. However, like its previous format as WDVW, it struggled in the ratings, given New Orleans' negative history with rock formats.

=== 2014-2016: Country ===
On January 3, 2014, at 9 a.m., after playing "No Sleep till Brooklyn" by The Beastie Boys, WRKN began stunting a "Wheel of Formats" as a tease to its audience. On January 6 at around 9:23 AM, a new country format branded "Nash FM 92-3" was unveiled. The first song on "Nash" was "Radio" by Darius Rucker.

On April 21, 2016, WRKN altered its format, expanding its presence to target the adjacent Baton Rouge market while tweaking its format towards a mix of 1990s and current country songs. The new shift came with a positioning change to “The Gulf South’s Country Giant”. With the change, Scott Innes joined the station to host middays. Innes had spent fifteen years at 101.5 WYNK in Baton Rouge prior to his exit in 2011, and was a cartoon voice actor known for portraying the voices of many Hanna Barbera characters, including Norville "Shaggy" Rogers, Scooby-Doo and Scrappy-Doo.

=== 2017-present: Alternative ===
On June 19, 2017, at noon, WRKN swapped formats and call signs with 106.1 WZRH. WRKN flipped to alternative rock as "Alt 92-3". Both stations inherited the other’s format and call letters during the switch.

During the impact of Hurricane Ida in August 2021, WZRH's main tower in Vacherie, shared with KVDU, toppled when it was hit by powerful winds. The old tower, which was 1,946 feet (596 meters) tall, has been substit with a new transmitter atop an old AT&T tower in LaPlace that stands at 427 feet (130 meters) in height above average terrain (HAAT). While it is still powered at 100,000 watts, the shorter tower restricts WZRH's signal toward Baton Rouge, and the station now mostly covers the New Orleans metropolitan area.
