= KMEZ (FM) =

Radio station in Belle Chasse, Louisiana

Coordinates: 29.954°N 89.950°W

- Belle Chasse, Louisiana; United States
- Broadcast area: New Orleans metropolitan area
- Frequency: 102.9 MHz
- Branding: KMEZ 102.9

Programming
- Format: Urban adult contemporary
- Affiliations: Compass Media Networks

Ownership
- Owner: Cumulus Media; (Radio License Holding CBC, LLC)
- Sister stations: KKND, WZRH, WRKN

History
- First air date: 1992
- Former call signs: KNOK (10/18/89-9/27/91, CP); KMEZ (9/27/91-5/29/08); KKND (5/29/08-12/17/18)

Technical information
- Licensing authority: FCC
- Facility ID: 12157
- Class: C3
- ERP: 4,700 watts
- HAAT: 184 meters (604 ft)

Links
- Public license information: Public file; LMS
- Webcast: Listen live
- Website: kmez1029.com

KMEZ (102.9 MHz), better known as "KMEZ 102.9", is an urban AC outlet serving the New Orleans area. The Cumulus Media station is licensed to Belle Chasse, Louisiana and broadcasts its format with an ERP of 4.7 kW. Its studios are located on the campus of Delgado Community College in New Orleans and the transmitter site is in Chalmette, Louisiana.

== History ==
The station, whose original calls were KMEZ, started off in 1992 with a gold-based Urban AC format and was known on-air as "Big Eazy 102.9", only to later re-image as "Old School 102.9" in an effort to capitalize on the growing interest in the Rhythmic/Urban Oldies format. By 2004, it modified its format by adding current Adult R&B product to its playlist and reimaged itself again as "102.9, Old School & Today's R&B" to reflect the changes—and compete with WYLD-FM and hip hop station WQUE. Despite being an Urban AC, KMEZ, who, during the fall of 2007, became the flagship station of the New Orleans Hornets of the National Basketball Association.

On May 20, 2008, KMEZ began simulcasting on sister station KKND, who in turn, dropped their struggling country format. The simulcast also marked KMEZ's move to the 106.7 frequency. This station received the callsign of KKND from 106.7 FM on May 29, 2008, which took the call sign of KXOS.

On July 3, 2008, at exactly 10:29 a.m., Rock with You by Michael Jackson signaled the end of the "Old School" format (as that station completed its move to 106.7 FM), with the song fading into the introduction of the new Rhythmic Contemporary-formatted "Power 102.9", signing on with 10,000 songs in a row, starting with New Orleans native Lil' Wayne's "Lollipop". The station's logo and Hip-Hop direction is loosely based on KPWR Los Angeles and is expected to challenge WQUE, who has dominated the R&B/Hip-Hop scene in New Orleans for nearly two decades and has yet to be defeated.

The station carried the syndicated Big Boy's Neighborhood from ABC Radio when it first signed on. In March 2010, due to the possibility of the show being cancelled due to the loss of their syndication deal with ABC, the program was dropped for a local show hosted by Big Abe & The Power Posse. The show only lasted two years, as they were replaced by the Atlanta-based Rickey Smiley Morning Show in October 2012.

Despite having a Hip-Hop heavy direction, KKND has adjusted its musical focus in summer 2013 to allow some Rhythmic Pop tracks to be played on the station. Citadel merged with Cumulus Media on September 16, 2011.

On December 6, 2018, the urban AC format of "Old School 106.7" moved back to the 102.9 FM frequency and rebranded as "KMEZ102.9". The two frequencies simulcasted until 106.7 adopted a new classic hits format as "The Krewe" the following month. The KMEZ call letters were returned on December 17, 2018; in addition, the KKND calls returned to 106.7 on the same date.
