= 2010–11 Los Angeles Lakers season =

NBA professional basketball team season

- Division champions
- Head coach: Phil Jackson
- General manager: Mitch Kupchak
- Owner: Jerry Buss
- Arena: Staples Center

Results
- Record: 57–25 (.695)
- Place: Division: 1st (Pacific); Conference: 2nd (Western)
- Playoff finish: Conference Semifinals (lost to Mavericks 0–4)
- Stats at Basketball Reference

Local media
- Television: Home: FS West HD Away: KCAL 9 HD
- Radio: 710 ESPN

The 2010–11 Los Angeles Lakers season was the 63rd season of the franchise, 62nd in the National Basketball Association (NBA) and 51st in Los Angeles. As both the three-time defending Western Conference Champions and the two-time defending NBA Champions, the Lakers attempted their third "three-peat" in franchise history (1952–54) and (2000–02), but were swept by the eventual champion Dallas Mavericks in the Western Conference Semi-finals. The Lakers marked the end of an era for head coach Phil Jackson, who was diagnosed with prostate cancer in March 2011. He proceeded to announce his retirement as head coach after the playoffs. The Lakers once again sold out all 41 home games for the season at Staples Center.

The Lakers clinched the Pacific Division for the 32nd time in franchise history. Despite winning as many games as the previous season, they did not win the top seed in the Western Conference playoffs, finishing the regular season four games behind the San Antonio Spurs. Kobe Bryant finished in fourth place in MVP voting. Lamar Odom became the first player in Lakers history to be named NBA Sixth Man of the Year. Despite Bryant spraining his left ankle in a game against the Mavericks on March 12, he aggravated the injury in Game 4 against the Hornets in the first round of the playoffs and still finished the series and played in the semi-finals despite the injury. In May, right after the playoffs, Bryant underwent a procedure on his right knee in Germany called platelet-rich plasma therapy.

Following the season, Odom was traded to the Dallas Mavericks.

== Key dates ==
- June 24 – The 2010 NBA draft was held in New York City.
- July 1 – The free agency period begun.
- October 26 – The Lakers' regular season began with a home game versus the Houston Rockets. The previous year's players received their championship rings and the team raised their 16th championship banner into the Staples Center rafters.
- February 20 – The 2011 NBA All-Star Game takes place in Los Angeles.
- February 24 – NBA trade deadline.
- March 20 – The Lakers clinched the Pacific Division title, clinching a playoff spot and at least the fourth seed in the playoffs.
- April 14 – The Lakers finished the regular season with a win against the Sacramento Kings, clinching the 2nd seed in the Western Conference playoffs in the process.
- May 8 – The Lakers were swept by the Dallas Mavericks in the second round of the Playoffs, ending the hopes of a three-peat.

== Offseason ==
=== Free agency ===
Entering the offseason, Derek Fisher, Adam Morrison, D. J. Mbenga and Josh Powell were all unrestricted free agents. Jordan Farmar was a restricted free agent, but the Lakers didn't extend a qualifying offer to him, also making him an unrestricted free agent. Shannon Brown exercised the player option on his contract and opted out of the remaining year of his contract that would have paid him $2.15 million. Fisher was the Lakers' main priority to re-sign in the offseason, but there was disagreement over the amount of the contract's worth, with both sides arguing between 2.5 and 5 million dollars per season. Fisher eventually agreed to a three-year contract worth $10.5 million with a player option on the final year.

On July 2, the Lakers agreed to terms with Los Angeles Clippers free agent Steve Blake on a four-year contract worth $16 million using most of the team's mid-level exception. The Lakers officially signed Blake to a four-year contract on July 8. On July 22, the Lakers signed free agent forward Matt Barnes to a two-year deal worth $3.6 million (with a player option on the second year) and center Theo Ratliff to a one-year deal worth $1.35 million. On August 5, Shannon Brown's agent announced that the Lakers will resign Brown to a two-year deal worth $4.6 million. Brown turned down more lucrative offers from the Knicks and Hornets and has a player option on his second year.

Backup point guard Jordan Farmar left the Lakers, indicating his desire to be a starter and signed with the New Jersey Nets. Backup power forward Josh Powell left the team and signed with the Atlanta Hawks. D. J. Mbenga and Adam Morrison signed with the New Orleans Hornets and Washington Wizards, respectively. The Lakers also signed both of their second-round draft picks Devin Ebanks (on August 13) and Derrick Caracter (on August 14) to non-guaranteed two-year deals. Ebanks earned the minimum rookie salary of $473,604. As he would stay with the Lakers, his second year salary was $736,420. Caracter agreed to a two-year, $1.1 million deal that was partially guaranteed. Caracter earned $473,604 that season. On April 13 the Lakers signed Trey Johnson due to injuries on the roster.

Head coach Phil Jackson also agreed to a one-year deal after considering retiring. After Jackson's deal, the Lakers were able to quickly reach agreements with the rest of the coaching staff. Longtime assistants Brian Shaw, Frank Hamblen and Jim Cleamons are returning and special assistant Chuck Person has officially been added to the staff.

In September, the Lakers signed Drew Naymick, Anthony Roberson, Trey Johnson, and Russell Hicks to the training camp squad, bringing their total number of players to 18. By the start of the season, the Lakers can have at the most 15 players. The Lakers eventually released all four players in October, bring their roster to 14 players.

== Draft picks ==
Round	Pick	Player	Position	Nationality	College/Team
2	43	Devin Ebanks	SF	United States	West Virginia
2	58	Derrick Caracter	PF	United States	UTEP

== Roster ==
2010–11 Los Angeles Lakers roster
Players

Pos.	No.	Player	Height	Weight	DOB	From
SF	15	Ron Artest	6 ft 7 in (2.01 m)	260 lb (118 kg)	1979-11-13	St. John's
SF	9	Matt Barnes	6 ft 7 in (2.01 m)	226 lb (103 kg)	1980-03-09	UCLA
PG	5	Steve Blake	6 ft 3 in (1.91 m)	172 lb (78 kg)	1980-02-26	Maryland
SG	12	Shannon Brown	6 ft 4 in (1.93 m)	210 lb (95 kg)	1985-11-29	Michigan State
SG	24	Kobe Bryant	6 ft 6 in (1.98 m)	205 lb (93 kg)	1978-08-23	Lower Merion HS (PA)
C	17	Andrew Bynum	7 ft 0 in (2.13 m)	285 lb (129 kg)	1987-10-27	St. Joseph HS (NJ)
C	45	Derrick Caracter	6 ft 9 in (2.06 m)	275 lb (125 kg)	1988-05-04	UTEP
SG	3	Devin Ebanks	6 ft 9 in (2.06 m)	215 lb (98 kg)	1989-10-28	West Virginia
PG	2	Derek Fisher	6 ft 1 in (1.85 m)	210 lb (95 kg)	1974-08-09	Little Rock
PF	16	Pau Gasol	7 ft 0 in (2.13 m)	250 lb (113 kg)	1980-07-06	Spain
SG	10	Trey Johnson	6 ft 5 in (1.96 m)	215 lb (98 kg)	1984-08-30	Jackson State
PF	7	Lamar Odom	6 ft 10 in (2.08 m)	230 lb (104 kg)	1979-11-06	Rhode Island
C	50	Theo Ratliff	6 ft 10 in (2.08 m)	235 lb (107 kg)	1973-04-17	Wyoming
PF	1	Joe Smith	6 ft 10 in (2.08 m)	225 lb (102 kg)	1975-07-26	Maryland
SF	4	Luke Walton	6 ft 8 in (2.03 m)	235 lb (107 kg)	1980-03-28	Arizona

Coaches
Head coach
- Phil Jackson
Assistant(s)
- Kareem Abdul-Jabbar
- Jim Cleamons
- Frank Hamblen
- Craig Hodges
- Chuck Person
- Brian Shaw

Legend
- (DP) Unsigned draft pick
- (FA) Free agent
- (S) Suspended
- Injured

Roster
Updated: April 13, 2011

== Season summary ==
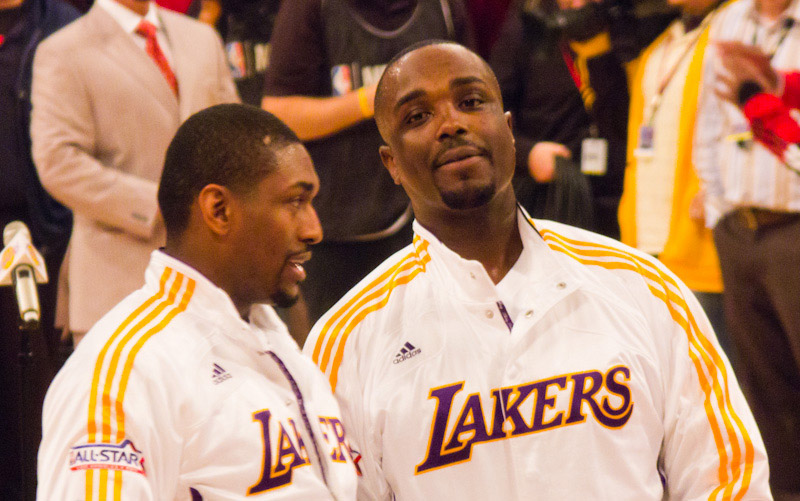
Ron Artest and Derrick Caracter.

The Lakers started the season at home versus the Houston Rockets. Last year's players and staff received their 2010 NBA Championship rings and the Lakers raised their 16th championship banner in the Staples Center rafters. With Andrew Bynum missing the season opener, Pau Gasol moved from starting power forward to center and Lamar Odom moved from backup forward to starting power forward. The starting lineup to begin the season was:

- C – Andrew Bynum
- PF – Pau Gasol
- SF – Ron Artest
- SG – Kobe Bryant
- PG – Derek Fisher

The Lakers started by winning their first four games while leading the NBA in scoring (113.8), 3-point shooting (46.8%) and offensive rebounds. They would go on to win their first eight games before losing back to back games in November. During their first 14 games, notable performances have included Kobe Bryant recording a triple double in a November 3 win against the Sacramento Kings. Matt Barnes and Pau Gasol became the only players besides Charles Barkley to record 20 points, five rebounds and five assists without missing on at least five shots from the field and the free throw line. They accomplished this feat two days apart on November 19 and 21, respectively, winning both games.

Several reasons have been given for the Lakers' early success including improved play by Lamar Odom, Pau Gasol and a better bench. The Lakers also have a light schedule during the early part of the season, playing most games at home while only three of the first 14 teams they've played have had winning records. This has also allowed Bryant to play a reduced role and stay fresher. The Lakers managed to jump out to a 13–2 start before losing their final three games of November. The Lakers extended their losing streak to four before beating the Sacramento Kings 113–80 on December 3. The Lakers started a seven-game December road trip by beating the Los Angeles Clippers 87–86 after Derek Fisher made the game winning layup as time expired. During the road trip they visited President Barack Obama in Washington, D.C. for the second time in 2010. Bynum played his first game of the season coming off the bench against the Washington Wizards on December 14 after missing the first 24 games of the season. On December 15, the Lakers were involved in a three-way trade that sent Sasha Vujačić and a protected (No.1-No.18) 2011 first round draft pick to the New Jersey Nets in return for Joe Smith and the Nets' second round picks they acquired from the Golden State Warriors and Chicago Bulls, respectively. The Lakers will also receive the draft rights to Sergei Lishouk from the Houston Rockets, as well as a trade exception.

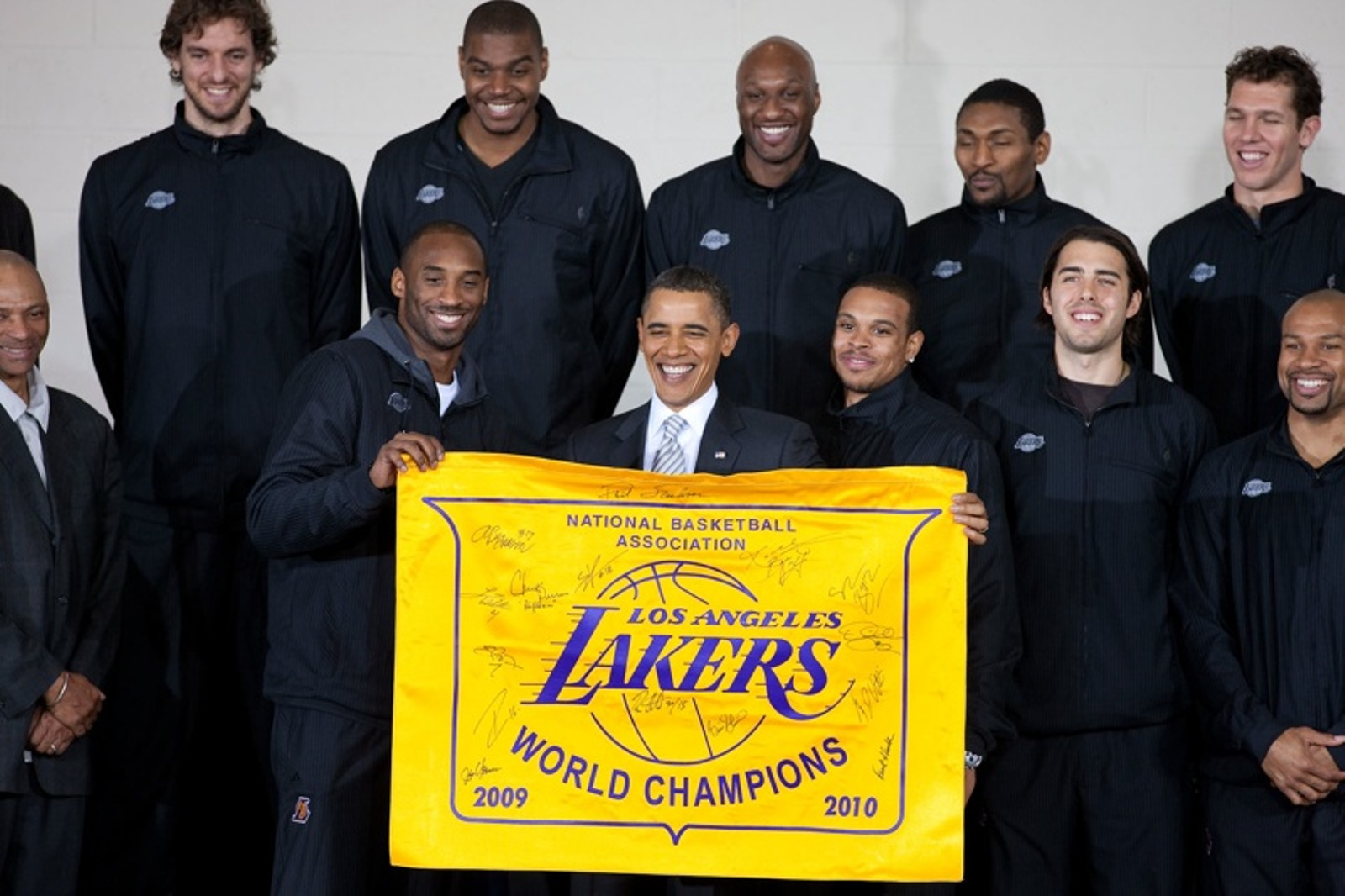
The Lakers meeting with President Barack Obama following their 2010 NBA championship

The Lakers finished their road trip 6–1, before losing at home 98–79 against the Milwaukee Bucks. Their next game was on Christmas Day against the Miami Heat, a home game they lost by 16 points. In their next game they fell to the San Antonio Spurs losing 97–82 marking their third straight loss, with all three losses by 15 or more points. The next day the Lakers bounced back with a 103–88 road win against the New Orleans Hornets behind Lamar Odom's 24 points. On January 7 against the New Orleans Hornets, Matt Barnes tore the lateral meniscus on his right knee and is expected to be out for eight weeks. On January 11, the Lakers beat the Cleveland Cavaliers by 55 points, the third largest margin of victory in franchise history. This was part of a seven-game winning streak that was snapped in a "road" game versus the Los Angeles Clippers. The Lakers final seven games before the All-Star Game were on the road while the Grammys were taking place at Staples Center. They started off winning their first four games before losing their final three. In Boston on February 10, Bryant scored 20 of his 23 points in the second half as the Lakers rallied from an early 15-point deficit for a 92–86 win over the Celtics. It was the Lakers first victory of the season against one of the league's top four teams, as they entered the game 0–5 in previous matchups and had been outscored by an average of 11 points. The Lakers finished the trip with a 104–99 loss to the Cleveland Cavaliers, and the Lakers entered the All-Star break on a three-game losing streak and the league's sixth best record. The Cavaliers entered the game having lost 37 of its previous 39 games including an NBA record 26 consecutive losses and the earlier 112–57 loss to the Lakers. Gasol recorded his first 30-point, 20-rebound game against the Cavaliers. Lakers general manager Mitch Kupchak and the press had discussed trade possibilities, but the trade deadline passed on February 24 without any moves. Both Bryant and Gasol were selected to play in the 2011 All-Star Game, with Bryant winning the All-Star MVP award.

After the All-Star break, the Lakers started 8–0 including a 16-point blowout against the top ranked San Antonio Spurs (51–12), whom they led by as many as 32 points in the third quarter. The win also ended the Spurs' franchise-record home winning streak at 22. Jackson conceded that San Antonio's 6½-game lead in the West may be too big to overcome with 18 games left. On March 10, the Lakers ended their winning streak, losing to the Heat 94–88, while the Heat stopped their five-game losing streak. Since the All-Star break, the Lakers rejuvenated themselves with tough defense and strong performances by Andrew Bynum. On March 20, Bynum was suspended for two games for a flagrant foul against Michael Beasley. On March 22, the Lakers defeated the Suns 139–137 in triple overtime. Bryant scored 42 points, and Odom had a season-high 29 points and 16 rebounds while playing over 55 minutes filling in for the suspended Bynum. They followed that victory up with another win, 112–104 over the Los Angeles Clippers with the help of a 37-point performance from Bryant.

The Lakers improved their record to 17–1 since the All-Star break before losing five straight games, putting them out of reach from the best record in the Western Conference. The losing streak ended with a 102–93 home win over the Spurs, who sat out Tim Duncan, Tony Parker and Manu Ginóbili. However, Bynum sustained a hyperextended right knee when he landed on DeJuan Blair's foot in the game. He missed the remaining games of the season with a bruised knee, but returned for the playoffs. Blake was diagnosed with chickenpox and missed the rest of the season. During the Spurs' game, Bryant used a derogatory gay term in frustration over a referee's call and was later fined $100,000 by the NBA. The Lakers and Bryant later apologized for the use of the word while Bryant appealed the fine. The Lakers produced a public service announcement with Bryant and other Lakers denouncing Bryant's behavior. In the last game of the regular season, the Lakers secured the No. 2 seed in the Western Conference of the 2011 playoffs with a 116–108 overtime win over the Kings in possibly their last game in Sacramento. The Lakers surrendered a 20-point lead in the fourth quarter, but Bryant made a tying 3-pointer with 4.8 seconds remaining to send the game into overtime.

== Playoffs summary ==
=== First Round vs New Orleans Hornets ===
In the first round of the playoffs, the Lakers played the New Orleans Hornets, a team they beat four times in the regular season. The Lakers lost 109–100 in their opener in the playoffs to the Hornets, who were led by Chris Paul and his 33 points, 14 assists and seven rebounds. The Lakers had not lost a playoff opener at home in 15 years. Bryant had 34 points on 13-for-26 shooting, while Gasol had eight points on two-of-nine shooting, six rebounds, zero offensive rebounds and poor defense on pick-and-roll plays. "It's up to me to get myself going, be more aggressive, get myself into rhythm", Gasol said. "He's not naturally aggressive", Bryant said. Bynum and Barnes played after injuries at the end of the regular season, while Blake remained out with the chicken pox. The Lakers won Game 2, 87–78, led by Bynum's 17 points and 11 rebounds. Odom scored 16 points, and Artest added 15. Bryant had only 11 points, but insisted to Jackson that he guard Paul, who finished with 20 points and nine assists. Gasol had eight points and five rebounds, and shot just four-for-19 from the field in the first two games. Blake returned in Game 2 and did not score but had five assists and three rebounds. Bryant scored 30 points, Gasol added 17 points and 10 rebounds, and the Lakers won Game 3 in New Orleans, 100–86. Bryant again helped to defend Paul, who had 22 points, eight assists, and five turnovers. The Lakers lost 93–88 in Game 4 as Paul had 27 points, 15 assists and 13 rebounds and the smaller Hornets outrebounded the Lakers 39–32 and held a 20–4 advantage second-chance points. Bryant was scoreless in the first half, shooting 0–7, and he finished with 17 points on 5–18 shooting. Bryant sprained his left ankle with 1:32 remaining in the game, and used crutches to leave the arena. Bryant, after refusing to get an MRI exam and X-rays, played in Game 5 and had two spectacular dunks in a 106–90 victory. The larger Laker front line helped the team regain control in rebounds with a 42–25 advantage over the Hornets, resulting in a 22–2 disparity in second-chance points. Bynum had 18 points and 10 rebounds. The Lakers won the series 4–2 with a 98–80 win in Game 6. Bryant scored 22 of his 24 points in the first three-quarters, and Bynum had 18 points and 12 rebounds. The Lakers again outrebounded New Orleans, 43–30, and held the advantage in second-chance points, 21–4. Paul had 10 points, 11 assists and eight rebounds. Hornets head coach Monty Williams said, "Kobe's Kobe, but I thought Bynum decided the series. He was that good."

=== Conference Semifinals vs Dallas Mavericks ===
In the second round, the Lakers faced the Dallas Mavericks, who advanced past the Portland Trail Blazers, 4–2. In Game 1 of the series, the Lakers lost a close match to the Mavericks 96–94 after blowing a 16-point lead early in the 3rd quarter. Then in Game 2, the Lakers lost another game by a wider margin, 81–93. The Lakers also lost Ron Artest for the end of Game 2 and for Game 3 after he hit Dallas player J. J. Barea in the face in the closing moments of the game. Following Game 2, Andrew Bynum told the press that the team was having "trust issues", a comment that sparked doubt of the Lakers' ability to win the series and the playoffs. After losing both home games, the Lakers headed to Dallas hoping to patch up the 0–2 hole by snatching up a win or two and taking the series back home. But, things looked bleak as they entered the highly partisan atmosphere of the American Airlines Center at Dallas. The Lakers ended the first quarter of Game 3 down 2 points, but made a surge during the next two-quarters to take a 6-point lead. However, the Mavericks dominated the fourth quarter and took 32 points in that quarter to seal the game in their favor, 98–92, leaving the Lakers in an 0–3 hole. This intensified the doubts of the Lakers' attempt to make a three-peat, since no team in NBA history had ever climbed out of a 0–3 hole in the playoffs to win a series. The Lakers tried to make a last-ditch effort to win their final game in Dallas in Game 4, but were overwhelmed by Dallas in a 122–86 victory marked by a playoff record-tying 20 3-point field goals, many by Jason Terry, the star of the game. The Mavericks' bench scored the same as the whole Lakers roster. Lamar Odom and Andrew Bynum were also ejected from the game after flagrant fouls on Dirk Nowitzki and J. J. Barea, respectively. What became the Lakers' last stand in the 2010–11 postseason was also marked by coach Phil Jackson's retirement. The Dallas Mavericks swept the Lakers with ease and moved on to the conference finals for the first time since 2006. The Lakers missed a chance for a record third three-peat and were swept for the seventh time in franchise history.

Former Laker and ESPN analyst Magic Johnson was disgusted with the Lakers' performance in Game 4, and stated in the ESPN Game 4 halftime report that the first half was "the worst that I've ever seen the Lakers play in a game that they need ... like they're already on vacation." During the series, it seemed as if the Lakers had uncharacteristic problems with closing out their games, something that they are usually famed for. The Lakers were swept for the seventh time in franchise history, but this sweep by the Mavericks is only the second time that the Lakers have been swept with home-court advantage. The Lakers lost by 30-plus points in a playoffs game for the fourth time in franchise history and first since an embarrassing 39–point blowout loss to the Boston Celtics, 131–92 in Game 6 of the 2008 NBA Finals, prior to Lakers' blowout loss to the Celtics' in the NBA Finals game occurred was Game 1 of the 1985 NBA Finals was 34–point blowout known as the "Memorial Day Massacre". The Mavericks' win over the Lakers was the largest margin of victory in a game that clinched a sweep in the playoffs.

== Regular season ==
=== Standings ===
Pacific Division	W	L	PCT	GB	Home	Road	Div
y-Los Angeles Lakers	57	25	.695	–	30–11	27–14	12–4
Phoenix Suns	40	42	.488	17	23–18	17–24	9–7
Golden State Warriors	36	46	.439	21	26–15	10–31	5–11
Los Angeles Clippers	32	50	.390	25	23–18	9–32	7–9
Sacramento Kings	24	58	.293	33	11–30	13–28	7–9

#	Western Conference				
#	Team	W	L	PCT	GB
1	c-San Antonio Spurs	61	21	.744	–
2	y-Los Angeles Lakers	57	25	.695	4
3	x-Dallas Mavericks	57	25	.695	4
4	y-Oklahoma City Thunder	55	27	.671	6
5	x-Denver Nuggets	50	32	.610	11
6	x-Portland Trail Blazers	48	34	.585	13
7	x-New Orleans Hornets	46	36	.561	15
8	x-Memphis Grizzlies	46	36	.561	15
9	Houston Rockets	43	39	.524	18
10	Phoenix Suns	40	42	.488	21
11	Utah Jazz	39	43	.476	22
12	Golden State Warriors	36	46	.439	25
13	Los Angeles Clippers	32	50	.390	29
14	Sacramento Kings	24	58	.293	37
15	Minnesota Timberwolves	17	65	.207	44

== Game log ==
=== Pre-season ===
2010 preseason game log
Total: 4–4
Preseason

Game	Date	Team	Score	High points	High rebounds	High assists	Location Attendance	Record
1	October 4	Minnesota	L 92-111	Lamar Odom (17)	Derrick Caracter (9)	Steve Blake (4)	The O2 Arena (London, England); 18,689	0–1
2	October 7	FC Barcelona	L 88-92	Pau Gasol (25)	Lamar Odom (18)	Kobe Bryant (3)	Palau Sant Jordi (Barcelona, Spain); 16,236	0–2
3	October 13	Sacramento	W 98-95	Artest & Gasol (18)	Pau Gasol (12)	Lamar Odom (6)	Thomas & Mack Center (Las Vegas, NV); 15,134	1–2
4	October 16	Denver	W 102-95	Kobe Bryant (18)	Kobe Bryant (8)	Lamar Odom (7)	Staples Center; 16,304	2–2
5	October 17	Utah	L 94-99	Pau Gasol (28)	Lamar Odom (15)	Pau Gasol (4)	Staples Center; 15,690	2–3
6	October 19	Utah	L 74-82	Barnes & Brown (13)	Lamar Odom (9)	Lamar Odom (9)	Honda Center (Anaheim, CA); 15,625	2–4
7	October 21	Golden State	W 120-99	Pau Gasol (23)	Lamar Odom (12)	Steve Blake (7)	San Diego Sports Arena (San Diego, CA); 11,150	3–4
8	October 22	Golden State	W 105-102 (OT)	Kobe Bryant (22)	Pau Gasol (8)	Kobe Bryant (7)	Citizens Business Bank Arena (Ontario, CA); 10,556	4–4

2010–11 season schedule

=== Regular season ===
2010–11 game log
Total: 57–25 (home: 30–11; road: 27–14)
October: 3–0 (home: 2–0; road: 1–0)

Game	Date	Team	Score	High points	High rebounds	High assists	Location Attendance	Record
1	October 26	Houston	W 112-110	Pau Gasol (29)	Pau Gasol (11)	Kobe Bryant (7)	Staples Center; 18,997	1–0
2	October 29	@ Phoenix	W 114-106	Kobe Bryant (25)	Lamar Odom (17)	Pau Gasol (9)	US Airways Center; 18,422	2–0
3	October 31	Golden State	W 107-83	Pau Gasol (26)	Lamar Odom (14)	4 players tied (4)	Staples Center; 18,997	3–0

November: 10–5 (home: 6–2; road: 4–3)

Game	Date	Team	Score	High points	High rebounds	High assists	Location Attendance	Record
4	November 2	Memphis	W 124-105	Kobe Bryant (23)	Matt Barnes (14)	Lamar Odom (6)	Staples Center; 18,997	4–0
5	November 3	@ Sacramento	W 112-100	Kobe Bryant (30)	Pau Gasol (11)	Kobe Bryant (12)	ARCO Arena; 16,113	5–0
6	November 5	Toronto	W 108-103	Pau Gasol (30)	Lamar Odom (9)	Kobe Bryant (6)	Staples Center; 18,997	6–0
7	November 7	Portland	W 121-96	Lamar Odom (21)	Pau Gasol (14)	Pau Gasol (10)	Staples Center; 18,997	7–0
8	November 9	Minnesota	W 99-94	Kobe Bryant (33)	Pau Gasol (10)	Artest & Fisher (4)	Staples Center; 18,997	8–0
9	November 11	@ Denver	L 112-118	Kobe Bryant (34)	Pau Gasol (20)	Kobe Bryant (5)	Pepsi Center; 19,155	8–1
10	November 14	Phoenix	L 116-121	Pau Gasol (28)	Pau Gasol (17)	Kobe Bryant (14)	Staples Center; 18,997	8–2
11	November 16	@ Milwaukee	W 118-107	Kobe Bryant (31)	Pau Gasol (10)	Lamar Odom (6)	Bradley Center; 18,059	9–2
12	November 17	@ Detroit	W 103-90	Kobe Bryant (33)	Lamar Odom (14)	Derek Fisher (7)	The Palace of Auburn Hills; 20,284	10–2
13	November 19	@ Minnesota	W 112-95	Matt Barnes (24)	Pau Gasol (14)	Lamar Odom (7)	Target Center; 19,356	11–2
14	November 21	Golden State	W 117-89	Pau Gasol (28)	Lamar Odom (10)	Steve Blake (6)	Staples Center; 18,997	12–2
15	November 23	Chicago	W 98-91	Brown & Odom (21)	Pau Gasol (11)	Kobe Bryant (5)	Staples Center; 18,997	13–2
16	November 26	@ Utah	L 96-102	Kobe Bryant (31)	Pau Gasol (11)	Lamar Odom (5)	EnergySolutions Arena; 19,911	13–3
17	November 28	Indiana	L 92-95	Kobe Bryant (41)	Pau Gasol (12)	Derek Fisher (5)	Staples Center; 18,997	13–4
18	November 30	@ Memphis	L 96-98	Kobe Bryant (29)	Pau Gasol (14)	Kobe Bryant (5)	FedExForum; 17,638	13–5

December: 10–5 (home: 3–2; road: 7–3)

Game	Date	Team	Score	High points	High rebounds	High assists	Location Attendance	Record
19	December 1	@ Houston	L 99-109	Kobe Bryant (27)	Lamar Odom (11)	Steve Blake (5)	Toyota Center; 18,116	13–6
20	December 3	Sacramento	W 113-80	Kobe Bryant (22)	Lamar Odom (7)	Pau Gasol (5)	Staples Center; 18,997	14–6
21	December 7	Washington	W 115-108	Kobe Bryant (32)	Pau Gasol (14)	Pau Gasol (8)	Staples Center; 18,997	15–6
22	December 8	@ L.A. Clippers	W 87-86	Kobe Bryant (24)	Pau Gasol (10)	Pau Gasol (5)	Staples Center; 19,614	16–6
23	December 10	@ Chicago	L 84-88	Kobe Bryant (23)	Gasol & Odom (8)	Kobe Bryant (7)	United Center; 22,760	16–7
24	December 12	@ New Jersey	W 99-92	Kobe Bryant (32)	Pau Gasol (11)	Kobe Bryant (6)	Prudential Center; 16,561	17–7
25	December 14	@ Washington	W 103-89	Kobe Bryant (24)	Lamar Odom (10)	Pau Gasol (7)	Verizon Center; 16,513	18–7
26	December 15	@ Indiana	W 109-94	Kobe Bryant (31)	Lamar Odom (17)	Kobe Bryant (6)	Conseco Fieldhouse; 18,165	19–7
27	December 17	@ Philadelphia	W 93-81	Lamar Odom (28)	Pau Gasol (13)	Steve Blake (5)	Wells Fargo Center; 20,366	20–7
28	December 19	@ Toronto	W 120-110	Kobe Bryant (20)	Matt Barnes (9)	Bryant & Gasol (4)	Air Canada Centre; 19,935	21–7
29	December 21	Milwaukee	L 79-98	Kobe Bryant (21)	Pau Gasol (11)	Lamar Odom (6)	Staples Center; 18,997	21–8
30	December 25	Miami	L 80-96	Bryant & Gasol (17)	Lamar Odom (9)	Kobe Bryant (7)	Staples Center; 18,997	21–9
31	December 28	@ San Antonio	L 82-97	Kobe Bryant (21)	Shannon Brown (11)	Pau Gasol (5)	AT&T Center; 18,581	21–10
32	December 29	@ New Orleans	W 103-88	Lamar Odom (24)	Pau Gasol (12)	Derek Fisher (8)	New Orleans Arena; 18,018	22–10
33	December 31	Philadelphia	W 102-98	Kobe Bryant (33)	Andrew Bynum (15)	3 players tied (4)	Staples Center; 18,997	23–10

January: 10–5 (home: 7–3; road: 3–2)

Game	Date	Team	Score	High points	High rebounds	High assists	Location Attendance	Record
34	January 2	Memphis	L 85-104	Kobe Bryant (28)	Andrew Bynum (11)	Shannon Brown (3)	Staples Center; 18,997	23–11
35	January 4	Detroit	W 108-83	Pau Gasol (21)	Lamar Odom (9)	Kobe Bryant (8)	Staples Center; 18,997	24–11
36	January 5	@ Phoenix	W 99-95	Kobe Bryant (24)	Lamar Odom (10)	Pau Gasol (6)	US Airways Center; 18,105	25–11
37	January 7	New Orleans	W 101-97	Kobe Bryant (25)	Gasol & Odom (13)	Pau Gasol (7)	Staples Center; 18,997	26–11
38	January 9	New York	W 109-87	Kobe Bryant (27)	Lamar Odom (18)	Kobe Bryant (5)	Staples Center; 18,997	27–11
39	January 11	Cleveland	W 112-57	Artest & Bynum (15)	Pau Gasol (14)	Kobe Bryant (8)	Staples Center; 18,997	28–11
40	January 12	@ Golden State	W 115-110	Kobe Bryant (39)	Andrew Bynum (14)	Ron Artest (7)	Oracle Arena; 19,596	29–11
41	January 14	New Jersey	W 100-88	Kobe Bryant (27)	Lamar Odom (11)	Steve Blake (5)	Staples Center; 18,997	30–11
42	January 16	@ L.A. Clippers	L 92-99	Kobe Bryant (27)	Andrew Bynum (13)	Kobe Bryant (5)	Staples Center; 19,905	30–12
43	January 17	Oklahoma City	W 101-94	Bryant & Gasol (21)	Andrew Bynum (10)	Kobe Bryant (7)	Staples Center; 18,997	31–12
44	January 19	@ Dallas	L 100-109	Pau Gasol (23)	Lamar Odom (10)	Kobe Bryant (10)	American Airlines Center; 20,365	31–13
45	January 21	@ Denver	W 107-97	Artest & Gasol (19)	Pau Gasol (13)	Kobe Bryant (7)	Pepsi Center; 19,155	32–13
46	January 25	Utah	W 120-91	Kobe Bryant (21)	Andrew Bynum (11)	Kobe Bryant (6)	Staples Center; 18,997	33–13
47	January 28	Sacramento	L 95-100	Kobe Bryant (38)	Pau Gasol (11)	Kobe Bryant (7)	Staples Center; 18,997	33–14
48	January 30	Boston	L 96-109	Kobe Bryant (41)	Pau Gasol (7)	3 players tied (2)	Staples Center; 18,997	33–15

February: 9–4 (home: 3–1; road: 6–3)

Game	Date	Team	Score	High points	High rebounds	High assists	Location Attendance	Record
49	February 1	Houston	W 114-106 (OT)	Kobe Bryant (32)	Lamar Odom (20)	Kobe Bryant (11)	Staples Center; 18,997	34–15
50	February 3	San Antonio	L 88-89	Pau Gasol (19)	Andrew Bynum (10)	Kobe Bryant (10)	Staples Center; 18,997	34–16
51	February 5	@ New Orleans	W 101-95	Pau Gasol (34)	Pau Gasol (10)	Kobe Bryant (5)	New Orleans Arena; 18,426	35–16
52	February 7	@ Memphis	W 93-84	Kobe Bryant (19)	Lamar Odom (11)	Kobe Bryant (6)	FedExForum; 18,119	36–16
53	February 10	@ Boston	W 92-86	Kobe Bryant (23)	Lamar Odom (12)	Derek Fisher (5)	TD Garden; 18,624	37–16
54	February 11	@ New York	W 113-96	Kobe Bryant (33)	Kobe Bryant (10)	Steve Blake (7)	Madison Square Garden; 19,763	38–16
55	February 13	@ Orlando	L 75-89	Bryant & Bynum (17)	Andrew Bynum (9)	Kobe Bryant (5)	Amway Center; 19,193	38–17
56	February 14	@ Charlotte	L 89-109	Kobe Bryant (20)	Pau Gasol (10)	Artest & Gasol (5)	Time Warner Cable Arena; 19,488	38–18
57	February 16	@ Cleveland	L 99-104	Pau Gasol (30)	Pau Gasol (20)	Lamar Odom (6)	Quicken Loans Arena; 20,562	38–19
All-Star Break
58	February 22	Atlanta	W 104-80	Kobe Bryant (20)	Andrew Bynum (15)	Kobe Bryant (5)	Staples Center; 18,997	39–19
59	February 23	@ Portland	W 106-101 (OT)	Kobe Bryant (37)	Pau Gasol (14)	Kobe Bryant (6)	Rose Garden; 20,643	40–19
60	February 25	L.A. Clippers	W 108-95	Kobe Bryant (24)	Andrew Bynum (11)	Brown & Bryant (5)	Staples Center; 18,997	41–19
61	February 27	@ Oklahoma City	W 90-87	Pau Gasol (18)	Pau Gasol (11)	Kobe Bryant (7)	Oklahoma City Arena; 18,203	42–19

March: 12–1 (home: 8–0; road: 4–1)

Game	Date	Team	Score	High points	High rebounds	High assists	Location Attendance	Record
62	March 1	@ Minnesota	W 90-79	Kobe Bryant (24)	Pau Gasol (17)	Kobe Bryant (3)	Target Center; 17,111	43–19
63	March 4	Charlotte	W 92-84	Kobe Bryant (27)	Andrew Bynum (17)	Gasol & Odom (4)	Staples Center; 18,997	44–19
64	March 6	@ San Antonio	W 99-83	Kobe Bryant (26)	Andrew Bynum (17)	Lamar Odom (6)	AT&T Center; 18,996	45–19
65	March 8	@ Atlanta	W 101-87	Kobe Bryant (26)	Andrew Bynum (16)	Pau Gasol (5)	Philips Arena; 19,890	46–19
66	March 10	@ Miami	L 88-94	Kobe Bryant (24)	Andrew Bynum (12)	Ron Artest (6)	American Airlines Arena; 19,986	46–20
67	March 12	@ Dallas	W 96-91	Andrew Bynum (22)	Andrew Bynum (15)	Steve Blake (5)	American Airlines Center; 20,619	47–20
68	March 14	Orlando	W 97-84	Pau Gasol (23)	Andrew Bynum (18)	Pau Gasol (5)	Staples Center; 18,997	48–20
69	March 18	Minnesota	W 106-98	Pau Gasol (25)	Andrew Bynum (14)	Bryant & Odom (5)	Staples Center; 18,997	49–20
70	March 20	Portland	W 84-80	Kobe Bryant (22)	Pau Gasol (13)	Lamar Odom (6)	Staples Center; 18,997	50–20
71	March 22	Phoenix	W 139-137 (3OT)	Kobe Bryant (42)	Lamar Odom (16)	Kobe Bryant (9)	Staples Center; 18,997	51–20
72	March 25	L.A. Clippers	W 112-104	Kobe Bryant (37)	Andrew Bynum (12)	Kobe Bryant (6)	Staples Center; 18,997	52–20
73	March 27	New Orleans	W 102-84	Kobe Bryant (30)	Pau Gasol (16)	Kobe Bryant (5)	Staples Center; 18,997	53–20
74	March 31	Dallas	W 110-82	Kobe Bryant (28)	Andrew Bynum (13)	Ron Artest (6)	Staples Center; 18,997	54–20

April : 3–5 (home: 1–3; road: 2–2)

Game	Date	Team	Score	High points	High rebounds	High assists	Location Attendance	Record
75	April 1	@ Utah	W 96-85	Kobe Bryant (21)	Pau Gasol (9)	Blake & Bryant (4)	EnergySolutions Arena; 19,911	55–20
76	April 3	Denver	L 90-95	Kobe Bryant (28)	Andrew Bynum (16)	Lamar Odom (5)	Staples Center; 18,997	55–21
77	April 5	Utah	L 85-86	Kobe Bryant (20)	Andrew Bynum (23)	Blake & Bryant (5)	Staples Center; 18,997	55–22
78	April 6	@ Golden State	L 87-95	Kobe Bryant (25)	Andrew Bynum (17)	Lamar Odom (5)	Oracle Arena; 20,024	55–23
79	April 8	@ Portland	L 86-93	Kobe Bryant (24)	Lamar Odom (14)	Kobe Bryant (4)	Rose Garden; 20,697	55–24
80	April 10	Oklahoma City	L 106-120	Kobe Bryant (31)	Andrew Bynum (13)	Bryant & Fisher (4)	Staples Center; 18,997	55–25
81	April 12	San Antonio	W 102-93	Kobe Bryant (27)	Pau Gasol (17)	Pau Gasol (5)	Staples Center; 18,997	56–25
82	April 13	@ Sacramento	W 116-108 (OT)	Kobe Bryant (36)	Pau Gasol (13)	Lamar Odom (7)	Power Balance Pavilion; 17,641	57–25

2010–11 season schedule

=== Playoffs ===
2011 playoff game log
Total: 4–6 (home: 2–3; road: 2–3)
First Round: 4–2 (home: 2–1; road: 2–1)

Game	Date	Team	Score	High points	High rebounds	High assists	Location Attendance	Series
1	April 17	New Orleans	L 100–109	Kobe Bryant (34)	Ron Artest (11)	Pau Gasol (6)	Staples Center; 18,997	0–1
2	April 20	New Orleans	W 87–78	Andrew Bynum (17)	Andrew Bynum (11)	Steve Blake (5)	Staples Center; 18,997	1–1
3	April 22	@ New Orleans	W 100–86	Kobe Bryant (30)	Andrew Bynum (11)	Derek Fisher (5)	New Orleans Arena; 18,340	2–1
4	April 24	@ New Orleans	L 88–93	Kobe Bryant (17)	Andrew Bynum (9)	Kobe Bryant (8)	New Orleans Arena; 18,083	2–2
5	April 26	New Orleans	W 106–90	Kobe Bryant (19)	Andrew Bynum (10)	Bryant & Gasol (4)	Staples Center; 18,997	3–2
6	April 28	@ New Orleans	W 98–80	Kobe Bryant (24)	Andrew Bynum (12)	Ron Artest (5)	New Orleans Arena; 17,949	4–2

Conference Semifinals: 0–4 (home: 0–2; road: 0–2)

Game	Date	Team	Score	High points	High rebounds	High assists	Location Attendance	Series
1	May 2	Dallas	L 94–96	Kobe Bryant (36)	Lamar Odom (12)	Pau Gasol (7)	Staples Center; 18,997	0–1
2	May 4	Dallas	L 81–93	Kobe Bryant (23)	Andrew Bynum (13)	Derek Fisher (5)	Staples Center; 18,997	0–2
3	May 6	@ Dallas	L 92–98	Andrew Bynum (21)	Andrew Bynum (10)	Kobe Bryant (6)	American Airlines Center; 21,156	0–3
4	May 8	@ Dallas	L 86–122	Kobe Bryant (17)	Pau Gasol (8)	Pau Gasol (6)	American Airlines Center; 21,087	0–4

2011 playoff schedule

== Player statistics ==
Legend
GP	Games played	GS	Games started	MPG	Minutes per game
FG%	Field-goal percentage	3P%	3-point field-goal percentage	FT%	Free-throw percentage
RPG	Rebounds per game	APG	Assists per game	SPG	Steals per game
BPG	Blocks per game	PPG	Points per game

=== Season ===
Player	GP	GS	MPG	FG%	3P%	FT%	RPG	APG	SPG	BPG	PPG
Ron Artest	82	82	29.4	.397	.356	.676	3.3	2.1	1.5	.4	8.5
Matt Barnes	53	0	19.2	.470	.318	.779	4.3	1.3	.7	.4	6.7
Steve Blake	79	0	20.0	.359	.378	.867	2.0	2.2	.5	.0	4.0
Shannon Brown	82	0	19.1	.425	.349	.911	1.9	1.2	.8	.2	8.7
Kobe Bryant	82	82	33.9	.451	.323	.828	5.1	4.7	1.2	.1	25.3
Andrew Bynum	54	47	27.8	.574	.000	.660	9.4	1.4	.4	2.0	11.3
Derrick Caracter	41	0	5.2	.485	.000	.739	1.0	.2	.1	.20	2.0
Devin Ebanks	20	0	5.9	.412	.400	.783	1.4	.1	.20	.25	3.1
Derek Fisher	82	82	28.0	.389	.396	.806	1.9	2.7	1.2	.1	6.8
Pau Gasol	82	82	37.0	.529	.333	.823	10.2	3.3	.6	1.6	18.8
Lamar Odom	82	35	32.2	.530	.382	.675	8.7	3.0	0.6	.7	14.4
Theo Ratliff	10	0	7.0	.167	.000	.000	1.3	.3	.2	.5	.2
Joe Smith	12	0	3.7	.167	.000	1.000	1.5	.3	0	.3	0.5
Luke Walton	54	0	9.0	.328	.235	.700	1.2	1.1	.2	.1	1.7

=== Playoffs ===
Player	GP	GS	MPG	FG%	3P%	FT%	RPG	APG	SPG	BPG	PPG
Ron Artest	9	9	31.9	.443	.321	.762	4.6	2.2	1.1	.8	10.6
Matt Barnes	10	0	13.1	.395	.167	.571	2.8	.5	.7	.2	3.6
Steve Blake	9	0	16.1	.304	.333	.	1.6	2.2	.6	.0	2.2
Shannon Brown	10	0	16.6	.459	.280	.643	1.9	.7	.6	.2	7.2
Kobe Bryant	10	10	35.4	.446	.293	.820	3.4	3.3	1.6	.3	22.8
Andrew Bynum	10	10	32.0	.543	.	.833	9.6	.8	.5	1.4	14.4
Derek Fisher	10	10	32.5	.433	.412	.810	2.7	3.6	1.4	.2	8.2
Pau Gasol	10	10	35.8	.420	.500	.800	7.8	3.8	.4	1.7	13.1
Trey Johnson	3	0	4.0	.200	.000	.500	1.3	.3	.0	.0	1.0
Lamar Odom	10	1	28.6	.459	.200	.711	6.5	2.1	.2	.4	12.1
Theo Ratliff	1	0	1.0	.	.	.	1.0	.0	.0	.0	.0
Joe Smith	5	0	2.2	.000	.	.	.2	.0	.0	.0	.0
Luke Walton	1	0	4.0	.436	.000	.	1.0	.0	.0	.0	.0

== Awards, records and milestones ==
=== Awards ===
- Lamar Odom was named NBA Sixth Man of the Year, becoming the first player in Lakers history to do so.
- On April 26, Ron Artest won the J. Walter Kennedy Citizenship Award.

==== Week/Month ====
- On November 1, Pau Gasol was named Player of the Week for games played October 26 through October 31.
- On March 28, Kobe Bryant was named Player of the Week for games played March 21 through March 27.
- Phil Jackson was named Coach of the Month for March.
- Kobe Bryant was named Player of the Month for March.

==== All-Star ====
- Kobe Bryant was voted as an All-Star starter for the 13th consecutive time.
- Pau Gasol was selected as an All-Star reserve for the 4th time.
- Kobe Bryant was named the 2011 NBA All-Star MVP for a record-tying 4th time.

=== Records ===
- On November 3, Kobe Bryant played his 37,493rd minute, passing Kareem Abdul-Jabbar's record for all-time minutes played as a Laker.
- On November 14, Kobe Bryant became the youngest player in NBA history to reach 26,000 career points.
- On December 10, Kobe Bryant moved past John Havlicek into 11th place on the NBA career scoring list.
- On January 4, Kobe Bryant moved past Dominique Wilkins into 10th place on the NBA career scoring list.
- On January 7, Kobe Bryant moved past Oscar Robertson into 9th place on the NBA career scoring list.
- On January 28, Kobe Bryant moved past Hakeem Olajuwon into 8th place on the NBA career scoring list.
- On February 27, Kobe Bryant moved past Elvin Hayes into 7th place on the NBA career scoring list.
- On March 8, Kobe Bryant moved past Moses Malone into 6th place on the NBA career scoring list.
- On March 26, Kobe Bryant passed Kareem Abdul-Jabbar and played the most games of any Lakers player with 1,094th game.

=== Milestones ===
- On October 29, Phil Jackson won his 1,100th game.
- On December 7, with Andre Miller sitting out a game due to suspension, Derek Fisher became the NBA's active leader in consecutive games played with 434.

== Transactions ==
=== Trades ===
December 15, 2010
To New Jersey Nets

- (Slovenia) Sasha Vujačić
- 2011 first-round pick
- 2012 first-round pick
To Houston Rockets

- (United States) Terrence Williams
To Los Angeles Lakers

- (United States) Joe Smith
- 2011 second-round pick
- 2012 second-round pick

=== Free agents ===
==== Additions ====
Player	Signed	Former Team
Steve Blake	Signed 4-year contract for $16 million	Los Angeles Clippers
Derek Fisher	Signed 3-year contract for $10.5 million	Los Angeles Lakers
Matt Barnes	Signed 2-year contract for $3.6 million	Orlando Magic
Theo Ratliff	Signed 1-year contract for $1.35 million	Charlotte Bobcats
Shannon Brown	Signed 2-year contract for $4.6 million	Los Angeles Lakers
Trey Johnson	Terms Undisclosed	Bakersfield Jam

==== Subtractions ====
Player	Reason Left	New Team
Jordan Farmar	Free agent	New Jersey Nets
Josh Powell	Free agent	Atlanta Hawks
Adam Morrison	Free agent	Washington Wizards
D. J. Mbenga	Free agent	New Orleans Hornets
