= Melvin Ely =

American basketball player (born 1978)

Personal information
- Born: May 2, 1978 (age 48) Harvey, Illinois, U.S.
- Listed height: 6 ft 10 in (2.08 m)
- Listed weight: 261 lb (118 kg)

Career information
- High school: Thornton Township (Harvey, Illinois)
- College: Fresno State (1998–2002)
- NBA draft: 2002: 1st round, 12th overall pick
- Drafted by: Los Angeles Clippers
- Playing career: 2002–2016
- Position: Center / power forward
- Number: 2, 33, 34, 4
- Coaching career: 2016–2019

Career history

Playing
- 2002–2004: Los Angeles Clippers
- 2004–2007: Charlotte Bobcats
- 2007: San Antonio Spurs
- 2007–2009: New Orleans Hornets
- 2010–2011: Denver Nuggets
- 2012: Brujos de Guayama
- 2012–2014: Texas Legends
- 2014: New Orleans Pelicans
- 2014–2015: Gunma Crane Thunders

Coaching
- 2016–2019: Canton Charge (assistant)

Career highlights
- NBA champion (2007); NBA D-League All-Star (2014); 2× WAC Player of the Year (2001, 2002); 2× First-team All-WAC (2001, 2002); First-team Parade All-American (1997); McDonald's All-American (1997)
- Stats at NBA.com
- Stats at Basketball Reference
Medals
Men's basketball
Representing United States
Summer Universiade
Bronze medal – third place	2001 Beijing	Team competition

Melvin Anderson Ely (/iːˈlaɪ/; born May 2, 1978) is an American former professional basketball player who was also an assistant coach for the Canton Charge of the NBA G League.

A 6'10", 261 lb (118 kg), power forward–center from Fresno State, Ely was drafted by the Los Angeles Clippers in the first round (12th overall pick) of the 2002 NBA draft. At Fresno State, he enjoyed a prolific career under the coaching of Jerry Tarkanian.

== High school career ==
While attending Harvey Thornton High School, Ely earned All-American honors from McDonald's and Parade Magazine. As a senior in 1997, he averaged 15.5 points per game, 9.3 rebounds per game and 5.2 blocked shots per game during the regular season and was named the Chicago Sun-Times player of the year and first team all-state. Ely led his Wildcats to a second-place finish in 1995 and 1996 and third-place in 1997. During Ely's 3 years as a starter, Thornton Township posted a combined record of 93 wins and 4 losses, including marks of 32–1 in 1997, 31–1 in 1996 and 30–2 in 1995. 3 of those losses were to eventual IHSA 2A champions Peoria Manual.

In 2007, Ely was voted one of the "100 Legends of the IHSA Boys Basketball Tournament", recognizing his superior performance in his appearances in the tournament.

== College career ==
Under the guidance of coach Jerry Tarkanian at Fresno State, Ely led the Bulldogs to two NCAA tournament appearances in 2000 and 2001. Over his four‑year college career he played 124 games and averaged 15.7 points per game and 7.5 rebounds per game. He was a dominant presence at Fresno State: by the time he left, he had become the school’s all‑time leading scorer with 1,951 points, its leader in blocks with 362, and in total field goals made is 789. Ely earned top individual honors in college: he was named WAC Player of the Year twice in 2001 and 2002. He also earned First‑Team All‑WAC selections, All‑Defense recognition in the WAC, and was a key contributor to the Bulldogs reaching the postseason multiple times including NCAA Tournament appearances in 2000 and 2001. In his senior season 2001‑02, Ely averaged 23.3 points, 9.1 rebounds and 3.2 blocks per game one of the most impressive individual seasons in school history. Because of his outstanding performance and contributions, he was later inducted into the Fresno State Athletics Hall of Fame.

== Professional career ==
After two seasons in Los Angeles with limited playing time, Ely was traded by the Clippers along with teammate Eddie House on July 14, 2004, to the Charlotte Bobcats for two second-round draft picks in 2005 and 2006. During the 2004–05 and 2005–06 seasons, Ely rejuvenated his career as a prominent reserve role player. On October 2, 2006, he rejected offers from the Golden State Warriors and Phoenix Suns to sign a one-year, $3 million contract to remain with the Bobcats.

On February 13, 2007, he was traded to the San Antonio Spurs in exchange for forward Eric Williams and a second-round draft pick in 2009. He played only 6 games for the Spurs, averaging 3.2 points and 2.3 rebounds per game. He did not play for the Spurs in the playoffs yet he still won the championship ring.

In the 2007 off-season, Ely signed with the New Orleans Hornets. It was formally announced on September 12 that it was a two-year contract.

In 2012, Ely signed with the Brujos de Guayama of Puerto Rico.

On October 27, 2012, Ely signed with the Dallas Mavericks along with guard Chris Douglas-Roberts. He and Douglas-Roberts were waived the next day. On November 1, 2012, he was acquired by the Texas Legends of the NBA D-League.

In September 2013, Ely signed with the Memphis Grizzlies. However, he was waived on October 26.

In November 2013, he was re-acquired by the Texas Legends. On February 3, 2014, Ely was named to the Prospects All-Star roster for the 2014 NBA D-League All-Star Game. On April 14, 2014, he signed with the New Orleans Pelicans for the rest of the season.

Ely's final NBA game was April 16, 2014 in a 105 - 100 win over the Houston Rockets where he recorded 4 points and 1 block.

On July 15, 2014, he was traded to the Washington Wizards. On July 30, 2014, he was waived by the Wizards.

In September 2014, Ely signed a one-year deal with the Gunma Crane Thunders of the Japanese bj league.

On November 2, 2017, Ely was Inducted in to the Fresno Athletic Hall of Fame with some of his 2005 Fresno State teammates in attendance.

== Coaching career ==
On August 23, 2015, Ely was hired to join Martin Knezevic's staff in the newly-formed AmeriLeague in Las Vegas (league folded prior to the season).

On September 27, 2016, he was hired by the Canton Charge to serve as an assistant coach.

== NBA career statistics ==
Legend
GP	Games played	GS	Games started	MPG	Minutes per game
FG%	Field goal percentage	3P%	3-point field goal percentage	FT%	Free throw percentage
RPG	Rebounds per game	APG	Assists per game	SPG	Steals per game
BPG	Blocks per game	PPG	Points per game	**Bold**	Career high
†	Won an NBA championship

=== Regular season ===
Year	Team	GP	GS	MPG	FG%	3P%	FT%	RPG	APG	SPG	BPG	PPG
2002–03	L.A. Clippers	52	7	15.4	.495	.000	**.703**	3.3	.3	.2	.6	4.5
2003–04	L.A. Clippers	42	2	12.1	.431	.000	.595	2.4	.5	.2	.4	3.7
2004–05	Charlotte	**79**	17	20.9	.432	.000	.575	4.1	1.0	.4	**.9**	7.3
2005–06	Charlotte	57	**22**	**23.6**	.508	.000	.667	**4.9**	**1.3**	.5	.8	**9.8**
2006–07	Charlotte	24	0	10.2	.383	.000	.686	1.6	.6	.1	.3	2.9
2006–07†	San Antonio	6	0	10.8	.300	.000	.583	2.3	.7	**.7**	.3	3.2
2007–08	New Orleans	52	1	11.9	.472	.000	.552	2.8	.4	.1	.3	3.9
2008–09	New Orleans	31	4	12.0	.389	.000	.639	2.1	.6	.1	.3	3.1
2010–11	Denver	30	2	12.2	**.549**	.000	.619	2.5	.5	.1	.4	2.3
2013–14	New Orleans	2	0	13.5	.500	.000	.000	.5	.0	.0	.5	3.0
Career		375	55	16.0	.460	.000	.625	3.2	.7	.3	.6	5.3

=== Playoffs ===
Year	Team	GP	GS	MPG	FG%	3P%	FT%	RPG	APG	SPG	BPG	PPG
2008	New Orleans	7	0	8.4	.267	.000	.700	1.6	.1	.0	.0	2.1
Career		7	0	8.4	.267	.000	.700	1.6	.1	.0	.0	2.1
