= 2010–11 Utah Jazz season =

NBA professional basketball team season

- Head coach: Jerry Sloan (resigned) (through February 10, 2011); Tyrone Corbin (after February 10, 2011)
- General manager: Kevin O'Connor
- Owner: Gail Miller
- Arena: EnergySolutions Arena

Results
- Record: 39–43 (.476)
- Place: Division: 4th (Northwest); Conference: 11th (Western)
- Playoff finish: Did not qualify
- Stats at Basketball Reference

Local media
- Television: Root Sports Utah
- Radio: KFNZ; KBEE

The 2010–11 Utah Jazz season was the 32nd season of the franchise in Salt Lake City, and the 37th overall in the National Basketball Association (NBA). The Jazz started off the season strong, posting a 15–5 start to the season. Following a 121–99 routing of the Cleveland Cavaliers, the Jazz peaked in mid-January with a 27–13 record, the fourth-best record in the Western Conference at the time. However, on February 10, legendary Jazz head coach Jerry Sloan and longtime assistant Phil Johnson both resigned; Tyrone Corbin was named the new head coach. Soon after the All-Star break was ended, on February 23, the Jazz traded star player Deron Williams to the New Jersey Nets for two first round draft picks (New Jersey's 2011 and Golden State's conditional 2012) and players, rookie Derrick Favors and former All-Star Devin Harris. The Jazz would post an 8–17 record after All-Star break, including an 8–game losing streak between March 20 to April 3, and end the season with a losing 39–43 record, six games back on the 8th–seeded Memphis Grizzles. In doing so, the Jazz became the first team in NBA history to start 27–13, and failed to make the playoffs.

== Key dates ==
- June 24 – The 2010 NBA draft was held in New York City.
- July 1 – The free agency period began.

== Roster ==
2010–11 Utah Jazz roster
Players

Pos.	No.	Player	Height	Weight	DOB	From
SG	19	Raja Bell	6 ft 5 in (1.96 m)	215 lb (98 kg)	1976-09-19	FIU
C	50	Marcus Cousin	6 ft 11 in (2.11 m)	245 lb (111 kg)	1986-12-18	Houston
C	16	Francisco Elson	7 ft 0 in (2.13 m)	240 lb (109 kg)	1976-02-28	California
SF	40	Jeremy Evans	6 ft 9 in (2.06 m)	196 lb (89 kg)	1987-10-24	Western Kentucky
PF	15	Derrick Favors	6 ft 10 in (2.08 m)	246 lb (112 kg)	1991-07-15	Georgia Tech
C	44	Kyrylo Fesenko	7 ft 1 in (2.16 m)	300 lb (136 kg)	1986-12-24	Ukraine
PG	5	Devin Harris	6 ft 3 in (1.91 m)	190 lb (86 kg)	1983-02-27	Wisconsin
SF	20	Gordon Hayward	6 ft 7 in (2.01 m)	207 lb (94 kg)	1990-03-23	Butler
C	25	Al Jefferson	6 ft 10 in (2.08 m)	265 lb (120 kg)	1985-01-04	Prentiss HS (MS)
SF	47	Andrei Kirilenko	6 ft 9 in (2.06 m)	225 lb (102 kg)	1981-02-18	Russia
SF	34	C. J. Miles	6 ft 6 in (1.98 m)	227 lb (103 kg)	1987-03-18	Skyline HS
PF	24	Paul Millsap	6 ft 8 in (2.03 m)	250 lb (113 kg)	1985-02-10	Louisiana Tech
C	13	Mehmet Okur (injured)	6 ft 11 in (2.11 m)	263 lb (119 kg)	1979-05-26	Turkey
SG	17	Ronnie Price	6 ft 2 in (1.88 m)	184 lb (83 kg)	1983-06-21	Utah Valley
PG	11	Earl Watson	6 ft 1 in (1.85 m)	185 lb (84 kg)	1979-06-12	UCLA
SG	3	Kyle Weaver	6 ft 6 in (1.98 m)	201 lb (91 kg)	1986-02-18	Washington State

Coaches
Head coach
- Jerry Sloan (resigned)
- Tyrone Corbin
Assistant(s)
- Jeff Hornacek
- Phil Johnson
- Scott Layden
- Mark McKown

Legend
- (DP) Unsigned draft pick
- (FA) Free agent
- (S) Suspended
- Injured

Roster
Updated: March 30, 2011

== Pre-season ==
=== Game log ===
2010 pre-season game log
Pre-season: 8–0 (home: 3–0; road: 5–0)

Game	Date	Team	Score	High points	High rebounds	High assists	Location Attendance	Record
1	October 7	Portland	W 100–96	Deron Williams (15)	Paul Millsap (8)	Deron Williams (5)	EnergySolutions Arena; 19,492	1–0
2	October 11	@ Portland	W 109–100	Kyrylo Fesenko (18)	Kyrylo Fesenko (7)	Deron Williams (4)	Portland Memorial Coliseum; 10,651	2–0
3	October 12	@ Phoenix	W 105–100	Al Jefferson (16)	Kyrylo Fesenko (6)	Paul Millsap, Earl Watson, Ronnie Price, Gordon Hayward (3)	US Airways Center; 12,410	3–0
4	October 14	Phoenix	W 108–97	Al Jefferson (24)	Paul Millsap (7)	Deron Williams (5)	EnergySolutions Arena; 19,883	4–0
5	October 16	@ L.A. Clippers	W 103–91	C. J. Miles (20)	Paul Millsap, Jeremy Evans (7)	Ronnie Price (7)	Staples Center; 18,997	5–0
6	October 17	@ L.A. Lakers	W 99–94	Gordon Hayward (26)	Paul Millsap (7)	Earl Watson (6)	Staples Center; 15,690	6–0
7	October 19	@ L.A. Lakers	W 82–74	C. J. Miles (14)	Al Jefferson (8)	Deron Williams (5)	Honda Center; 15,625	7–0
8	October 22	Sacramento	W 82–71	Al Jefferson, Raja Bell, Kyrylo Fesenko (12)	Andrei Kirilenko (7)	Ronnie Price (8)	EnergySolutions Arena; 19,505	8–0

2010–11 season schedule

== Regular season ==
=== Standings ===
Northwest Division	W	L	PCT	GB	Home	Road	Div
y-Oklahoma City Thunder	55	27	.671	–	30–11	25–16	13–3
x-Denver Nuggets	50	32	.610	5	33–8	17–24	9–7
x-Portland Trail Blazers	48	34	.585	7	30–11	18–23	10–6
Utah Jazz	39	43	.476	16	21–20	18–23	7–9
Minnesota Timberwolves	17	65	.207	38	12–29	5–36	1–15

#	Western Conference				
#	Team	W	L	PCT	GB
1	c-San Antonio Spurs	61	21	.744	–
2	y-Los Angeles Lakers	57	25	.695	4
3	x-Dallas Mavericks	57	25	.695	4
4	y-Oklahoma City Thunder	55	27	.671	6
5	x-Denver Nuggets	50	32	.610	11
6	x-Portland Trail Blazers	48	34	.585	13
7	x-New Orleans Hornets	46	36	.561	15
8	x-Memphis Grizzlies	46	36	.561	15
9	Houston Rockets	43	39	.524	18
10	Phoenix Suns	40	42	.488	21
11	Utah Jazz	39	43	.476	22
12	Golden State Warriors	36	46	.439	25
13	Los Angeles Clippers	32	50	.390	29
14	Sacramento Kings	24	58	.293	37
15	Minnesota Timberwolves	17	65	.207	44

=== Game log ===
2010–11 game log
Total: 39–43 (Home: 21–20; Road: 18–23)
October: 1–2 (home: 0–1; road: 1–1)

Game	Date	Team	Score	High points	High rebounds	High assists	Location Attendance	Record
1	October 27	@ Denver	L 88–110	Deron Williams (17)	Paul Millsap (8)	Deron Williams (6)	Pepsi Center; 19,155	0–1
2	October 28	Phoenix	L 94–110	Al Jefferson (20)	Paul Millsap (13)	Deron Williams (6)	EnergySolutions Arena; 19,911	0–2
3	October 31	@ Oklahoma City	W 120–99	Paul Millsap (30)	Paul Millsap (16)	Deron Williams (15)	Oklahoma City Arena; 18,203	1–2

November: 13–3 (home: 7–2; road: 6–1)

Game	Date	Team	Score	High points	High rebounds	High assists	Location Attendance	Record
4	November 3	Toronto	W 125–108	Al Jefferson (27)	Deron Williams (8)	Deron Williams (14)	EnergySolutions Arena; 17,802	2–2
5	November 5	@ Golden State	L 78–85	Deron Williams (23)	Al Jefferson (15)	Deron Williams (6)	Oracle Arena; 17,902	2–3
6	November 6	L.A. Clippers	W 109–107 (2OT)	Deron Williams (30)	Paul Millsap (13)	Deron Williams (7)	EnergySolutions Arena; 19,911	3–3
7	November 9	@ Miami	W 116–114 (OT)	Paul Millsap (46)	Al Jefferson, Andrei Kirilenko, Paul Millsap (9)	Deron Williams (14)	American Airlines Arena; 19,600	4–3
8	November 10	@ Orlando	W 104–94	Deron Williams (30)	Al Jefferson (8)	Deron Williams (14)	Amway Center; 18,846	5–3
9	November 12	@ Atlanta	W 90–86	Deron Williams (24)	Andrei Kirilenko (12)	Deron Williams (10)	Philips Arena; 17,069	6–3
10	November 13	@ Charlotte	W 96–95	Al Jefferson (19)	Andrei Kirilenko (7)	Deron Williams (9)	Time Warner Cable Arena; 15,486	7–3
11	November 15	Oklahoma City	L 108–115	Deron Williams (31)	Paul Millsap, Francisco Elson (6)	Deron Williams (11)	EnergySolutions Arena; 19,911	7–4
12	November 17	New Jersey	W 98–88	Deron Williams (23)	Paul Millsap (15)	Deron Williams (8)	EnergySolutions Arena; 19,314	8–4
13	November 19	San Antonio	L 82–94	Deron Williams (23)	Paul Millsap (7)	Andrei Kirilenko, Deron Williams (5)	EnergySolutions Arena; 19,332	8–5
14	November 20	@ Portland	W 103–94	C. J. Miles (25)	Al Jefferson (14)	Deron Williams (11)	Rose Garden; 20,533	9–5
15	November 22	Sacramento	W 94–83	C. J. Miles (20)	Paul Millsap (9)	Deron Williams (9)	EnergySolutions Arena; 18,698	10–5
16	November 24	New Orleans	W 105–87	Deron Williams (26)	Al Jefferson (10)	Deron Williams (11)	EnergySolutions Arena; 19,237	11–5
17	November 26	L.A. Lakers	W 102–96	Deron Williams (29)	Al Jefferson, Paul Millsap (8)	Deron Williams (12)	EnergySolutions Arena; 19,911	12–5
18	November 28	@ L.A. Clippers	W 109–97	Deron Williams (26)	Deron Williams (5)	Deron Williams (9)	Staples Center; 17,085	13–5
19	November 29	Milwaukee	W 109–88	Al Jefferson, Deron Williams (22)	Al Jefferson (11)	Deron Williams (10)	EnergySolutions Arena; 18,497	14–5

December: 8–6 (home: 4–3; road: 4–3)

Game	Date	Team	Score	High points	High rebounds	High assists	Location Attendance	Record
20	December 1	Indiana	W 110–88	Deron Williams (24)	Al Jefferson (10)	Deron Williams (16)	EnergySolutions Arena; 18,732	15–5
21	December 3	Dallas	L 81–93	Paul Millsap (21)	Al Jefferson (8)	Deron Williams (7)	EnergySolutions Arena; 19,623	15–6
22	December 6	Memphis	W 94–85	Deron Williams (27)	Al Jefferson (10)	Deron Williams (8)	EnergySolutions Arena; 19,131	16–6
23	December 8	Miami	L 98–111	Al Jefferson (25)	Al Jefferson (11)	Deron Williams (12)	EnergySolutions Arena; 19,911	16–7
24	December 10	Orlando	W 117–105	Deron Williams (32)	Andrei Kirilenko (13)	Deron Williams (9)	EnergySolutions Arena; 18,765	17–7
25	December 11	@ Dallas	L 97–103	Deron Williams (34)	Al Jefferson (9)	Deron Williams (6)	American Airlines Center; 20,074	17–8
26	December 13	Golden State	W 108–95	Deron Williams (30)	Al Jefferson, Paul Millsap (8)	Deron Williams (10)	EnergySolutions Arena; 19,176	18–8
27	December 17	@ New Orleans	L 71–100	Paul Millsap (14)	Paul Millsap (6)	Deron Williams (5)	New Orleans Arena; 14,414	18–9
28	December 18	@ Milwaukee	W 95–86	Deron Williams (22)	Al Jefferson, Andrei Kirilenko, Paul Millsap (9)	Deron Williams (11)	Bradley Center; 16,004	19–9
29	December 20	@ Cleveland	W 101–90	C. J. Miles (22)	Al Jefferson (13)	Deron Williams (10)	Quicken Loans Arena; 20,562	20–9
30	December 22	@ Minnesota	W 112–107	Deron Williams (25)	Paul Millsap (11)	Deron Williams (7)	Target Center; 15,809	21–9
31	December 27	Portland	L 91–96	Deron Williams (31)	Al Jefferson (9)	Deron Williams (6)	EnergySolutions Arena; 19,911	21–10
32	December 29	@ L.A. Clippers	W 103–95	Al Jefferson (31)	Al Jefferson (10)	Deron Williams (7)	Staples Center; 19,060	22–10
33	December 30	@ Portland	L 89–100	Deron Williams (19)	Al Jefferson (10)	Deron Williams (8)	Rose Garden; 20,652	22–11

January: 7–9 (home: 6–2; road: 1–7)

Game	Date	Team	Score	High points	High rebounds	High assists	Location Attendance	Record
34	January 1	Memphis	W 98–92	Paul Millsap (22)	Paul Millsap (10)	Earl Watson (6)	EnergySolutions Arena; 19,732	23–11
35	January 3	Detroit	W 102–97	Deron Williams (22)	Paul Millsap (10)	Deron Williams (10)	EnergySolutions Arena; 19,911	24–11
36	January 5	Atlanta	L 87–110	Andrei Kirilenko, Deron Williams (19)	Al Jefferson (7)	Deron Williams (9)	EnergySolutions Arena; 19,911	24–12
37	January 7	@ Memphis	L 99–110	Paul Millsap (20)	Al Jefferson (13)	Deron Williams (6)	FedExForum; 14,781	24–13
38	January 8	@ Houston	W 103–99 (OT)	Paul Millsap (27)	Al Jefferson (13)	Deron Williams (15)	Toyota Center; 16,113	25–13
39	January 12	New York	W 131–125	C. J. Miles, Deron Williams (24)	Paul Millsap (8)	Deron Williams (12)	EnergySolutions Arena; 19,911	26–13
40	January 14	Cleveland	W 121–99	Deron Williams (26)	Al Jefferson, Mehmet Okur (7)	Deron Williams (9)	EnergySolutions Arena; 19,911	27–13
41	January 17	@ Washington	L 101–108	Deron Williams (28)	Al Jefferson (10)	Deron Williams (11)	Verizon Center; 14,925	27–14
42	January 19	@ New Jersey	L 95–103	Al Jefferson (21)	Al Jefferson, Andrei Kirilenko (8)	Deron Williams (10)	Prudential Center; 13,251	27–15
43	January 21	@ Boston	L 86–110	Earl Watson (12)	Andrei Kirilenko (7)	Deron Williams (6)	TD Garden; 18,624	27–16
44	January 22	@ Philadelphia	L 85–96	Deron Williams (20)	Al Jefferson (13)	Deron Williams (14)	Wells Fargo Center; 14,036	27–17
45	January 25	@ L.A. Lakers	L 91–120	Deron Williams (17)	Al Jefferson (9)	Deron Williams (8)	Staples Center; 18,997	27–18
46	January 26	San Antonio	L 105–112	Deron Williams (39)	Al Jefferson (9)	Deron Williams (9)	EnergySolutions Arena; 19,911	27–19
47	January 28	Minnesota	W 108–100	Paul Millsap (30)	Al Jefferson (14)	Earl Watson (13)	EnergySolutions Arena; 19,911	28–19
48	January 30	@ Golden State	L 81–96	Al Jefferson (16)	Al Jefferson (14)	Paul Millsap (6)	Oracle Arena; 18,187	28–20
49	January 31	Charlotte	W 83–78	Al Jefferson (21)	Paul Millsap (12)	Earl Watson (6)	EnergySolutions Arena; 19,499	29–20

February: 3–9 (home: 0–6; road: 3–3)

Game	Date	Team	Score	High points	High rebounds	High assists	Location Attendance	Record
50	February 2	Houston	L 96–97	Al Jefferson, Paul Millsap (20)	Al Jefferson (12)	Earl Watson (8)	EnergySolutions Arena; 19,619	29–21
51	February 4	@ Denver	W 113–106	Al Jefferson (28)	Al Jefferson (10)	Deron Williams (12)	Pepsi Center; 19,155	30–21
52	February 5	Oklahoma City	L 105–121	Paul Millsap (34)	Paul Millsap (10)	Deron Williams (11)	EnergySolutions Arena; 19,711	30–22
53	February 7	@ Sacramento	W 107–104	Al Jefferson (23)	Andrei Kirilenko (8)	Deron Williams (9)	ARCO Arena; 11,509	31–22
54	February 9	Chicago	L 86–91	Al Jefferson (26)	Paul Millsap (14)	Deron Williams (12)	EnergySolutions Arena; 19,911	31–23
55	February 11	Phoenix	L 83–95	C. J. Miles, Deron Williams (19)	Al Jefferson (12)	Deron Williams (14)	EnergySolutions Arena; 19,911	31–24
56	February 15	@ Phoenix	L 101–102	Al Jefferson (32)	Al Jefferson (10)	Deron Williams (11)	US Airways Center; 16,874	31–25
57	February 16	Golden State	L 100–107	Al Jefferson (23)	Al Jefferson (11)	Deron Williams (11)	EnergySolutions Arena; 19,911	31–26
All-Star Break
58	February 23	@ Dallas	L 99–118	Al Jefferson (30)	Paul Millsap (9)	Andrei Kirilenko, Earl Watson (5)	American Airlines Center; 20,379	31–27
59	February 25	@ Indiana	W 95–84	Al Jefferson (30)	Paul Millsap (18)	Devin Harris (5)	Conseco Fieldhouse; 16,205	32–27
60	February 26	@ Detroit	L 116–120	Paul Millsap (23)	Paul Millsap (11)	Devin Harris (12)	The Palace of Auburn Hills; 18,564	32–28
61	February 28	Boston	L 102–107	Al Jefferson (28)	Al Jefferson (19)	Devin Harris (5)	EnergySolutions Arena; 19,911	32–29

March: 4–10 (home: 3–4; road: 1–6)

Game	Date	Team	Score	High points	High rebounds	High assists	Location Attendance	Record
62	March 3	Denver	L 101–103	C. J. Miles (22)	Al Jefferson (10)	Devin Harris (9)	EnergySolutions Arena; 19,524	32–30
63	March 5	Sacramento	W 107–102 (OT)	Al Jefferson (27)	Francisco Elson (9)	Devin Harris (7)	EnergySolutions Arena; 19,911	33–30
64	March 7	@ New York	L 109–131	Al Jefferson (36)	Al Jefferson (12)	Earl Watson (8)	Madison Square Garden; 19,763	33–31
65	March 9	@ Toronto	W 96–94	Al Jefferson (34)	Al Jefferson (8)	Devin Harris (5)	Air Canada Centre; 14,425	34–31
66	March 11	@ Minnesota	L 101–122	Gordon Hayward (18)	Al Jefferson (9)	Earl Watson (9)	Target Center; 18,534	34–32
67	March 12	@ Chicago	L 100–118	Al Jefferson (33)	Al Jefferson (18)	Raja Bell, Devin Harris, C. J. Miles, Earl Watson (3)	United Center; 22,885	34–33
68	March 14	Philadelphia	W 112–107 (OT)	Al Jefferson (30)	Al Jefferson (17)	Al Jefferson, Andrei Kirilenko (6)	EnergySolutions Arena; 19,632	35–33
69	March 16	Minnesota	W 119–104	C. J. Miles (40)	Al Jefferson (11)	Earl Watson (8)	EnergySolutions Arena; 19,465	36–33
70	March 20	@ Houston	L 108–110	Paul Millsap (35)	Al Jefferson (19)	Al Jefferson, Paul Millsap (4)	Toyota Center; 14,459	36–34
71	March 21	@ Memphis	L 85–103	Paul Millsap (15)	Jeremy Evans, Paul Millsap (6)	Paul Millsap, Ronnie Price (4)	FedExForum; 12,688	36–35
72	March 23	@ Oklahoma City	L 94–106	Al Jefferson (32)	Al Jefferson (12)	Raja Bell (4)	Oklahoma City Arena; 18,203	36–36
73	March 24	New Orleans	L 117–121 (OT)	Paul Millsap (33)	Al Jefferson (13)	Earl Watson (8)	EnergySolutions Arena; 18,840	36–37
74	March 26	Dallas	L 77–94	Al Jefferson (21)	Al Jefferson (7)	Ronnie Price (6)	EnergySolutions Arena; 19,649	36–38
75	March 28	Washington	L 95–100 (OT)	C. J. Miles (17)	Al Jefferson (16)	Earl Watson (9)	EnergySolutions Arena; 19,724	36–39

April: 3–4 (home: 1–2; road: 2–2)

Game	Date	Team	Score	High points	High rebounds	High assists	Location Attendance	Record
76	April 1	L.A. Lakers	L 85–96	C. J. Miles (24)	Al Jefferson (10)	Al Jefferson (5)	EnergySolutions Arena; 19,911	36–40
77	April 3	@ Sacramento	L 97–106	Paul Millsap (21)	Al Jefferson (9)	Earl Watson (8)	Power Balance Pavilion; 17,215	36–41
78	April 5	@ L.A. Lakers	W 86–85	Gordon Hayward, Paul Millsap (22)	Derrick Favors, Al Jefferson (11)	Earl Watson (6)	Staples Center; 18,997	37–41
79	April 7	Portland	L 87–98	Devin Harris (26)	Al Jefferson (14)	Devin Harris, Al Jefferson (5)	EnergySolutions Arena; 18,831	37–42
80	April 9	@ San Antonio	L 102–111	Al Jefferson (23)	Al Jefferson (8)	Devin Harris (9)	AT&T Center; 18,802	37–43
81	April 11	@ New Orleans	W 90–78	Devin Harris, C. J. Miles (18)	Al Jefferson, Paul Millsap (6)	Devin Harris, Al Jefferson, C. J. Miles (5)	New Orleans Arena; 12,558	38–43
82	April 13	Denver	W 107–103	Gordon Hayward (34)	Al Jefferson (10)	Devin Harris (6)	EnergySolutions Arena; 19,051	39–43

2010–11 season schedule

== Awards, records and milestones ==
=== Awards ===
==== Week/Month ====
- On November 15, Deron Williams was named Western Conference Player of the Week (November 8–November 14).

== Transactions ==
=== Trades ===
July 8, 2010
To Chicago Bulls

- (United States) Carlos Boozer
  Protected second-round pick
To Utah Jazz

- Player exception
July 13, 2010
To Minnesota Timberwolves

- (Greece) Kosta Koufos
  2011 protected first-round pick (of the Memphis Grizzlies)
  Future protected first-round pick
To Utah Jazz

- (United States) Al Jefferson
February 23, 2011
To New Jersey Nets

- (United States) Deron Williams
- (Netherlands) Dan Gadzuric
- (United States) Brandan Wright
To Golden State Warriors

- (United States) Troy Murphy
To Utah Jazz

- (United States) Devin Harris
- (United States) Derrick Favors
- Two future first-round picks

=== Free agents ===
==== Additions ====
Player	Signed	Former Team
Raja Bell	3 years, $10 million	Golden State Warriors

==== Subtractions ====
Player	Reason Left	New Team
Carlos Boozer	Free agent	Chicago Bulls
Kyle Korver	Free agent	Chicago Bulls
Wesley Matthews	Free agent	Portland Trail Blazers

== Player statistics ==
Legend
GP	Games played	GS	Games started	MPG	Minutes per game
FG%	Field-goal percentage	3P%	3-point field-goal percentage	FT%	Free-throw percentage
RPG	Rebounds per game	APG	Assists per game	SPG	Steals per game
BPG	Blocks per game	PPG	Points per game

=== Regular season ===
Player	GP	GS	MPG	FG%	3P%	FT%	RPG	APG	SPG	BPG	PPG
Al Jefferson	82	82	35.9	.496		.761	9.7	1.8	.6	1.9	18.6
Earl Watson	80	13	19.6	.410	.336	.671	2.3	3.5	.8	.2	4.3
C. J. Miles	78	19	25.2	.407	.322	.811	3.3	1.7	.9	.5	12.8
Paul Millsap	76	76	34.3	.531	.391	.757	7.6	2.5	1.4	.9	17.3
Gordon Hayward	72	17	16.9	.485	.473	.711	1.9	1.1	.4	.3	5.4
Raja Bell	68	63	30.8	.409	.352	.892	2.6	1.7	.8	.2	8.0
Andrei Kirilenko	64	62	31.2	.467	.367	.770	5.1	3.0	1.3	1.2	11.7
Francisco Elson	62	1	9.8	.478		.839	1.9	.5	.3	.2	2.2
Ronnie Price	59	0	12.2	.352	.290	.744	1.0	.9	.7	.1	3.3
Deron Williams^{†}	53	53	37.9	.458	.345	.853	3.9	9.7	1.2	.2	21.3
Kyrylo Fesenko	53	1	8.6	.440	.000	.391	2.0	.3	.1	.3	2.0
Jeremy Evans	49	3	9.4	.661	.000	.703	2.0	.5	.3	.3	3.6
Derrick Favors^{†}	22	4	20.2	.529		.561	5.2	.8	.5	1.2	8.2
Devin Harris^{†}	17	16	31.2	.413	.357	.811	2.4	5.4	.8	.1	15.8
Mehmet Okur	13	0	12.9	.355	.313	.750	2.3	1.5	.3	.3	4.9
Kyle Weaver	5	0	13.8	.360	.429	.875	2.0	1.4	.4	.4	5.6
Marcus Cousin	4	0	4.5	.667			.8	.0	.0	.3	1.0

- ^{†} Denotes player spent time with another team in the season. Stats reflect time with the Jazz only.
