= Gary Forbes =

Panamanian basketball player (born 1985)

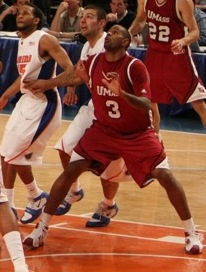

Personal information
- Born: February 25, 1985 (age 41) Colón, Panama
- Listed height: 6 ft 7 in (2.01 m)
- Listed weight: 220 lb (100 kg)

Career information
- High school: Benjamin Banneker Academy (Brooklyn, New York)
- College: Virginia (2003–2005); UMass (2006–2008)
- NBA draft: 2008: undrafted
- Playing career: 2008–2020
- Position: Small forward
- Number: 0, 3

Career history
- 2008: Sioux Falls Skyforce
- 2008–2009: Tulsa 66ers
- 2009: Talk 'N Text Tropang Texters
- 2009: Trotamundos de Carabobo
- 2009–2010: Vanoli Cremona
- 2010: Ironi Ramat Gan
- 2010–2011: Denver Nuggets
- 2011–2012: Toronto Raptors
- 2012–2013: Zhejiang Lions
- 2013–2014: Springfield Armor
- 2015–2016: Atenienses de Manatí
- 2016: Grand Rapids Drive
- 2016–2017: Long Island Nets
- 2017: Boca Juniors
- 2017: Cocodrilos de Caracas
- 2017: Faros Larissas
- 2017–2018: Universitarios
- 2018: Al-Ittihad Jeddah
- 2020: Saigon Heat

Career highlights
- Atlantic 10 Player of the Year (2008); First-team All-Atlantic 10 (2008)
- Stats at NBA.com
- Stats at Basketball Reference

Gary Orlando Forbes (born February 25, 1985) is a Panamanian former professional basketball player. He played professionally for 12 years, including two seasons in the National Basketball Association (NBA). Forbes played college basketball for the Virginia Cavaliers, and the UMass Minutemen.

== High school career ==
Forbes and his mother moved to Brooklyn, New York when he was a child. He went on to attend and play basketball at Benjamin Banneker Academy in Brooklyn. He scored 1,512 points and grabbed 766 rebounds during his high school career, and established career records for points, rebounds, and blocked shots. In local awards, he was selected the Newsday Player of the Year in Brooklyn as a senior, nominated for City Player of the Year, and earned first-team All-City and All-Tri-State honors. He was also a McDonald's All-American finalist.

As a junior, Forbes averaged 27 points, 11 rebounds and six assists a game. As a senior, he averaged 31 points, 13 rebounds, three assists, and three blocked shots a game. That year, he scored 30 points and grabbed 10 rebounds in Benjamin Banneker's 75–69 loss to Lincoln High School in the Public School Athletic League "A" Championship game at Madison Square Garden.

== College career ==
Forbes was ranked as the #4 shooting guard, and the #20 overall prospect on ESPN's Top 100 for the incoming class of 2003. He committed to play at the University of Virginia, after also receiving scholarship offers from Georgia Tech and Mississippi State. Coach Pete Gillen's group of newcomers was ranked #17 on the list of top recruiting classes on Rivals.com.

As a freshman in 2003–04, Forbes played in all of Virginia's 31 games, starting in 17. He averaged 7.6 points and 4.0 rebounds per game. He finished second on the team in blocked shots (28) and steals (30). Tallied 22 points (season-high) and 9 rebounds against Minnesota in the ACC – Big Ten Challenge. As a sophomore in 2004–05, Forbes played in 29 games, started 4, and averaged 9.4 points and 4.1 rebounds per game. Scored 23 (season-high), on 8–11 shooting, in a loss at #4 North Carolina. After starting the game at Duke, Forbes tallied a double-double with 17 points and 10 rebounds.

Gillen resigned from Virginia after the end of the 2004–05 season, and Forbes decided to transfer out of the school. He transferred to the University of Massachusetts, and due to NCAA transfer rules, he was forced to sit out the 2005–06 season.

In the 2006–07 season, his first with the Minutemen, Forbes started in 23 of the team's 33 games. Playing behind established seniors Rashaun Freeman and Stéphane Lasme, Forbes still averaged 13.0 points and 5.8 rebounds per game. He scored a career-high 31 points and grabbed 14 rebounds in a game at Temple. Forbes scored 20 or more points on three other occasions and snared 16 rebounds in a game versus Richmond. Helped the Minutemen win their first Atlantic 10 title since the 1995–96 season. UMass also advanced to the second round of the NIT, their first post-season play since the 1999–2000 season.

Coming into his senior year in 2007–08, Forbes was named to the Preseason Atlantic 10 Third Team. By the end of the regular season, he was averaging 20.3 points per game, tied for the league lead in scoring with Temple's Dionte Christmas. Forbes scored 25 or more points on six occasions, including a 29-point high at Northern Iowa. The A-10 honored him as the league's Player of the Year and also placed him on the all-conference First Team. Forbes helped UMass make a deep run in the NIT, advancing past Syracuse, two-time defending NCAA champion Florida, and on to the final before falling to Ohio State. He was named to the NIT's All-Tournament team.

Forbes scored a total of 1,639 points over his college career (698 at Virginia, 1,128 at UMass).

== Professional career ==
After UMass, Forbes participated in the NBA Pre-Draft Camp in Orlando in the summer of 2008. However, he was not selected in the 2008 NBA draft. The Washington Wizards invited him to participate in their summer mini-camp, and he played in all 5 games, but he only averaged 3.8 points and 0.6 rebounds per game.

In August 2008, Forbes had signed with Italian club Basket Napoli, but the team soon dissolved.

Forbes was selected as the #4 overall pick in the 2008 NBA Development League draft, by the Sioux Falls Skyforce. In the D-League's 2008–09 season, he played 22 games for Sioux Falls before being traded to the Tulsa 66ers, where he played in 30 games. Overall that season, Forbes averaged 17.4 points and 5.3 rebounds per game. He also participated in the league's All-Star weekend, finishing third in the Three-Point Shootout.

Forbes then played several short stints with international clubs.

- May 2009: played for the Talk N Text Tropang Texters club in the Philippines. Played in 2 games, and averaged 27.5 ppg.
- May/June 2009: played for Carabobo Globetrotters in Venezuela. Played 5 games.
- July 2009: played in the NBA's Summer League with the Philadelphia 76ers.
- July 2009: signed with Italian club Soresina.
- August 2009: signed with Italian club Gruppo Triboldi.
- 2009–10: played for Italian club Vanoli Cremona. Played in 15 games, averaged 13.3 ppg.
- 2010: played for Ironi Kfar Hamaccabia Ramat Gan in the Israeli Basketball Super League. The club started 2–11 before Forbes joined, then went 4–5 the rest of the regular season with him. Forbes scored 28 in his team debut, then went on to average 20.3 ppg (best in the league). However, the team's poor season record forced them to the Relegation Playoffs, where they lost their series, and would be demoted to the National League in the 2010–11 season.

In July 2010, Forbes returned to the US for another shot at the NBA. He was invited to play with the Houston Rockets on their summer league team in Las Vegas. Forbes played in 4 of the team's 5 games, averaging 3.8 points and 3.0 rebounds per game.

On September 18, 2010, the Denver Nuggets invited Forbes to a training camp. Playing in 8 games, Forbes averaged 19.0 minutes, 10.1 points, and 2.9 rebounds per game. He survived pre-season cuts and made the season roster.

On December 10, 2011, Forbes signed an offer sheet with the Toronto Raptors. On December 13, 2011, Forbes was officially signed by the Raptors.

On July 11, 2012, Forbes was traded to the Houston Rockets along with a future first round pick for Kyle Lowry. He was waived by Houston on October 29, 2012.

In December 2012, Forbes joined the Zhejiang Lions club in the Chinese Basketball Association. He replaced Al Thornton on the team.

In September 2013, Forbes signed with the Brooklyn Nets. However, he was waived on October 17.

On November 1, 2013, Forbes was acquired by the Springfield Armor. On January 3, 2014, he was waived by the Armor due to a season-ending injury.

On December 21, 2015, Forbes signed with Atenienses de Manatí of the Puerto Rican Baloncesto Superior Nacional. On March 28, 2016, he left Atenienses and was acquired by the Grand Rapids Drive. That night he made his debut for the Drive in a 136–105 loss to Raptors 905, recording four points, two rebounds and one assist in one minute.

On November 1, 2016, Forbes was acquired by the Long Island Nets of the NBA Development League. On January 17, he was waived by the Nets after appearing in 20 games.

On February 19, 2017, Forbes signed with Boca Juniors of the Liga Nacional de Básquet.

On September 21, 2017, Forbes signed with Faros Larissas for the 2017–18 Greek Basket League season. On February 24, 2018, he joined Al-Ittihad Jeddah of the Saudi Premier League.

== National team career ==
In the summer of 2007, Forbes played with the Panama men's national basketball team at the 2007 FIBA Americas Championship, in Las Vegas. In four games with the team, he averaged 17.8 points and 4.5 rebounds per game. He scored a game high 29 points against Argentina. He was also played with Panama at the 2011 FIBA Americas Championship, and the 2017 FIBA AmeriCup.

== The Basketball Tournament (TBT) ==
In the summer of 2017, Forbes competed in The Basketball Tournament on ESPN for the Talladega Knights. Competing for the $2 million grand prize, Forbes scored 14 points and grabbed eight rebounds in the Knights' 78–74 first round loss to Paul's Champion's; a team led by former NBA point guard Earl Boykins. Forbes also played for Talladega during the summer of 2016. In two games, he averaged 16.0 points, 4.0 rebounds and 3.0 assists as the Knights fell to the City of Gods in the second round.

In TBT 2018, Forbes suited up for Gael Nation. In 2 games, he averaged 6.5 points, 2.5 rebounds, and 1 assist per game. Gael Nation reached the second round before falling to Armored Athlete.

== Personal life ==
Forbes has type 1 diabetes, which has a history in his family. He was diagnosed with the disease at the age of 19, initially keeping the diagnosis secret out of fear that it would affect his career prospects. He has five older siblings.

== Career statistics ==
Legend
GP	Games played	GS	Games started	MPG	Minutes per game
FG%	Field goal percentage	3P%	3-point field goal percentage	FT%	Free throw percentage
RPG	Rebounds per game	APG	Assists per game	SPG	Steals per game
BPG	Blocks per game	PPG	Points per game	**Bold**	Career high

=== NBA ===
==== Regular season ====
Year	Team	GP	GS	MPG	FG%	3P%	FT%	RPG	APG	SPG	BPG	PPG
2010–11	Denver	**63**	**11**	12.6	**.454**	.328	.678	1.8	.8	.4	**.1**	5.2
2011–12	Toronto	48	2	**14.9**	.413	**.349**	**.725**	**2.1**	**1.1**	**.5**	**.1**	**6.6**
**Career**		111	13	13.5	.434	.340	.702	2.0	.9	.4	.1	5.8

==== Playoffs ====
Year	Team	GP	GS	MPG	FG%	3P%	FT%	RPG	APG	SPG	BPG	PPG
2011	Denver	1	0	2.0	.000	–	–	1.0	.0	.0	.0	.0
