= 2010–11 Denver Nuggets season =

NBA professional basketball team season

- Head coach: George Karl
- Arena: Pepsi Center

Results
- Record: 50–32 (.610)
- Place: Division: 2nd (Northwest); Conference: 5th (Western)
- Playoff finish: First Round (lost to Thunder 1–4)
- Stats at Basketball Reference

Local media
- Television: Altitude Sports and Entertainment
- Radio: KCKK

The 2010–11 Denver Nuggets season was the 44th season of the franchise, its 35th in the National Basketball Association (NBA). After half a season of rumors and speculation, the Nuggets granted Carmelo Anthony his wish by trading him to the New York Knicks on February 21 as part of a three-team trade with the Minnesota Timberwolves. The blockbuster trade also sent Chauncey Billups, Anthony Carter, Renaldo Balkman, Shelden Williams, and Corey Brewer to the Knicks for Wilson Chandler, Danilo Gallinari, Raymond Felton, Timofey Mozgov, Kosta Koufos, New York's first-round pick in the 2014 draft and Golden State's second-round picks in 2012 and 2013. Minnesota received Denver's 2015 second-round pick, Eddy Curry and Anthony Randolph.

After the trade, Nuggets coach George Karl said, "I'm glad its over. I'm glad it's an opportunity to reinvent", expressing relief at the end of the months of speculation preceding the trade.

== Key dates ==
- June 24 – The 2010 NBA draft took place in New York City.
- July 1 – The free agency period begun.

== Summary ==
=== Free agency ===
This free agency period, the Nuggets signed Al Harrington & Shelden Williams

== Roster ==
2010–11 Denver Nuggets roster
Players

Pos.	No.	Player	Height	Weight	DOB	From
SG	6	Arron Afflalo	6 ft 5 in (1.96 m)	215 lb (98 kg)		UCLA
C	11	Chris Andersen	6 ft 10 in (2.08 m)	228 lb (103 kg)		Blinn
SF	21	Wilson Chandler	6 ft 8 in (2.03 m)	220 lb (100 kg)		DePaul
C	34	Melvin Ely (IN)	6 ft 10 in (2.08 m)	261 lb (118 kg)		Fresno State
PG	20	Raymond Felton	6 ft 1 in (1.85 m)	198 lb (90 kg)		North Carolina
SF	0	Gary Forbes	6 ft 7 in (2.01 m)	220 lb (100 kg)		UMass
SF	8	Danilo Gallinari	6 ft 10 in (2.08 m)	225 lb (102 kg)		Italy
PF	7	Al Harrington	6 ft 9 in (2.06 m)	250 lb (113 kg)		St. Patrick High School (NJ)
C	41	Kosta Koufos (IN)	7 ft 0 in (2.13 m)	265 lb (120 kg)		Ohio State
PG	3	Ty Lawson	5 ft 11 in (1.80 m)	195 lb (88 kg)		North Carolina
PF	4	Kenyon Martin	6 ft 9 in (2.06 m)	240 lb (109 kg)		Cincinnati
C	25	Timofey Mozgov	7 ft 1 in (2.16 m)	250 lb (113 kg)		Russia
PF	31	[[Nenê {{{last}}} |Nenê {{{last}}}]]	6 ft 11 in (2.11 m)	250 lb (113 kg)		Brazil
SG	5	J. R. Smith	6 ft 6 in (1.98 m)	220 lb (100 kg)		St. Benedict's Prep (NJ)

Coaches
Head coach
- George Karl (North Carolina)
Assistant(s)
- Adrian Dantley (Notre Dame)
- Melvin Hunt (Baylor)
- John Welch (UNLV)
- Chad Iske (Kansas)
- Stacey Augmon (UNLV)

Legend
- (DP) Unsigned draft pick
- (FA) Free agent
- (S) Suspended
- Injured

== Pre-season ==
=== Game log ===
2010 pre-season game log
Pre-season: 5–3 (home: 2–0; road: 3–3)

Game	Date	Team	Score	High points	High rebounds	High assists	Location Attendance	Record
1	October 8	Portland	W 109–99	Carmelo Anthony (24)	Shelden Williams (14)	Ty Lawson (6)	Pepsi Center; 10,864	1–0
2	October 12	@ Minnesota	L 108–122	Arron Afflalo (20)	Shelden Williams (8)	Ty Lawson (6)	Target Center; 8,718	1–1
3	October 14	@ L.A. Clippers	W 100–95	Carmelo Anthony (30)	Carmelo Anthony (14)	Carmelo Anthony (9)	Staples Center; 10,572	2–1
4	October 16	@ L.A. Lakers	L 95–102	Arron Afflalo (20)	Renaldo Balkman (10)	Ty Lawson (7)	Staples Center; 16,304	2–2
5	October 17	@ L.A. Clippers	W 108–104	J. R. Smith (24)	Eric Boateng (10)	Ty Lawson (7)	Staples Center n/a	3–2
6	October 19	Oklahoma City	W 130–115	Arron Afflalo (22)	Carmelo Anthony (9)	Chauncey Billups (8)	Pepsi Center; 13,549	4–2
7	October 21	@ Portland	L 83–90	Carmelo Anthony (21)	Carmelo Anthony, Melvin Ely (7)	Ty Lawson (7)	Rose Garden; 19,710	4–3
8	October 22	@ Phoenix	W 144–106	Ty Lawson (29)	Arron Afflalo (9)	Arron Afflalo (10)	US Airways Center; 15,440	5–3

2010–11 season schedule

== Regular season ==
=== Standings ===
Northwest Division	W	L	PCT	GB	Home	Road	Div
y-Oklahoma City Thunder	55	27	.671	–	30–11	25–16	13–3
x-Denver Nuggets	50	32	.610	5	33–8	17–24	9–7
x-Portland Trail Blazers	48	34	.585	7	30–11	18–23	10–6
Utah Jazz	39	43	.476	16	21–20	18–23	7–9
Minnesota Timberwolves	17	65	.207	38	12–29	5–36	1–15

#	Western Conference				
#	Team	W	L	PCT	GB
1	c-San Antonio Spurs	61	21	.744	–
2	y-Los Angeles Lakers	57	25	.695	4
3	x-Dallas Mavericks	57	25	.695	4
4	y-Oklahoma City Thunder	55	27	.671	6
5	x-Denver Nuggets	50	32	.610	11
6	x-Portland Trail Blazers	48	34	.585	13
7	x-New Orleans Hornets	46	36	.561	15
8	x-Memphis Grizzlies	46	36	.561	15
9	Houston Rockets	43	39	.524	18
10	Phoenix Suns	40	42	.488	21
11	Utah Jazz	39	43	.476	22
12	Golden State Warriors	36	46	.439	25
13	Los Angeles Clippers	32	50	.390	29
14	Sacramento Kings	24	58	.293	37
15	Minnesota Timberwolves	17	65	.207	44

=== Game log ===
2010–11 game log
Total: 50–32 (home: 33–8; road: 17–24)
October: 2–1 (home: 1–0; road: 1–1)

Game	Date	Team	Score	High points	High rebounds	High assists	Location Attendance	Record
1	October 27	Utah	W 110–88	Carmelo Anthony (23)	Shelden Williams (16)	Chauncey Billups (8)	Pepsi Center; 19,155	1–0
2	October 29	@ New Orleans	L 95–101	Carmelo Anthony (24)	Shelden Williams (13)	Chauncey Billups (5)	New Orleans Arena; 12,474	1–1
3	October 30	@ Houston	W 107–94	Al Harrington (28)	Nenê (12)	Carmelo Anthony (4)	Toyota Center; 18,161	2–1

November: 8–5 (home: 6–1; road: 2–4)

Game	Date	Team	Score	High points	High rebounds	High assists	Location Attendance	Record
4	November 3	Dallas	L 101–102	Carmelo Anthony (20)	Carmelo Anthony (15)	Ty Lawson (9)	Pepsi Center; 14,159	2–2
5	November 5	L.A. Clippers	W 111–104	Carmelo Anthony (30)	Melvin Ely, Al Harrington (8)	Chauncey Billups (7)	Pepsi Center; 15,559	3–2
6	November 6	@ Dallas	W 103–92	Carmelo Anthony (27)	Al Harrington (8)	Ty Lawson, J. R. Smith (5)	American Airlines Center; 19,948	4–2
7	November 8	@ Chicago	L 92–94	Carmelo Anthony (32)	Carmelo Anthony (8)	Chauncey Billups (4)	United Center; 21,355	4–3
8	November 9	@ Indiana	L 113–144	Ty Lawson (19)	Nenê (6)	Arron Afflalo, J. R. Smith (4)	Conseco Fieldhouse; 11,122	4–4
9	November 11	L.A. Lakers	W 118–112	Carmelo Anthony (32)	Carmelo Anthony (13)	Ty Lawson (5)	Pepsi Center; 19,155	5–4
10	November 15	@ Phoenix	L 94–100	Carmelo Anthony (20)	Carmelo Anthony (22)	Al Harrington (4)	US Airways Center; 17,744	5–5
11	November 16	New York	W 120–118	Carmelo Anthony (26)	Carmelo Anthony, Gary Forbes (9)	Chauncey Billups (8)	Pepsi Center; 15,190	6–5
12	November 18	@ Portland	L 83–86	Carmelo Anthony (18)	Arron Afflalo (11)	Chauncey Billups, Ty Lawson (5)	Rose Garden; 20,532	6–6
13	November 20	New Jersey	W 107–103	Carmelo Anthony (28)	Carmelo Anthony, Nenê (8)	Chauncey Billups (7)	Pepsi Center; 16,396	7–6
14	November 22	@ Golden State	W 106–89	Carmelo Anthony (39)	Carmelo Anthony, Al Harrington, Nenê (9)	Carmelo Anthony, Ty Lawson (5)	Oracle Arena; 18,023	8–6
15	November 26	Chicago	W 98–97	Carmelo Anthony (22)	J. R. Smith (9)	Carmelo Anthony (8)	Pepsi Center; 19,155	9–6
16	November 28	Phoenix	W 138–133	J. R. Smith (30)	Nenê (9)	Chauncey Billups (8)	Pepsi Center; 15,482	10–6

December: 8–7 (home: 6–2; road: 2–5)

Game	Date	Team	Score	High points	High rebounds	High assists	Location Attendance	Record
17	December 1	Milwaukee	W 105–94	Nenê (24)	J. R. Smith (10)	Chauncey Billups (9)	Pepsi Center; 14,221	11–6
18	December 3	L.A. Clippers	W 109–104	Carmelo Anthony (26)	Nenê (7)	Chauncey Billups (5)	Pepsi Center; 15,829	12–6
19	December 5	Memphis	W 108–107	Nenê (27)	Nenê (11)	Ty Lawson, Nenê (6)	Pepsi Center; 15,017	13–6
20	December 7	@ Charlotte	L 98–100	Chauncey Billups (25)	Carmelo Anthony (7)	Chauncey Billups, Ty Lawson (5)	Time Warner Cable Arena; 15,737	13–7
21	December 8	@ Boston	L 89–105	Ty Lawson (24)	Al Harrington (8)	Chauncey Billups, Ty Lawson (7)	TD Garden; 18,624	13–8
22	December 10	@ Toronto	W 123–116	Al Harrington (31)	Shelden Williams (7)	Chauncey Billups (8)	Air Canada Centre; 14,715	14–8
23	December 12	@ New York	L 125–129	Carmelo Anthony (31)	Carmelo Anthony (13)	Chauncey Billups (6)	Madison Square Garden; 19,387	14–9
24	December 14	Orlando	W 111–94	Carmelo Anthony (35)	Carmelo Anthony (11)	Ty Lawson (6)	Pepsi Center; 16,247	15–9
25	December 16	San Antonio	L 112–113	Carmelo Anthony (31)	Carmelo Anthony (9)	Ty Lawson (7)	Pepsi Center; 16,190	15–10
26	December 18	Minnesota	W 115–113	Carmelo Anthony (24)	Carmelo Anthony (7)	Ty Lawson (9)	Pepsi Center; 15,409	16–10
27	December 22	@ San Antonio	L 103–109	Ty Lawson, J. R. Smith (22)	Arron Afflalo (10)	Chauncey Billups (7)	AT&T Center; 18,581	16–11
28	December 25	@ Oklahoma City	L 106–114	Chauncey Billups (30)	Nenê (12)	Ty Lawson (5)	Oklahoma City Arena; 18,203	16–12
29	December 26	Philadelphia	L 89–95	Chauncey Billups (24)	Chris Andersen, J. R. Smith (11)	Chauncey Billups, Ty Lawson (4)	Pepsi Center; 19,155	16–13
30	December 28	Portland	W 95–77	Chauncey Billups (18)	Chris Andersen (11)	Chauncey Billups (9)	Pepsi Center; 17,388	17–13
31	December 29	@ Minnesota	W 119–113	Chauncey Billups (36)	Chris Andersen (7)	Chauncey Billups, Ty Lawson, J. R. Smith (5)	Target Center; 17,093	18–13

January: 10–7 (home: 7–2; road: 3–5)

Game	Date	Team	Score	High points	High rebounds	High assists	Location Attendance	Record
32	January 1	Sacramento	W 104–86	Chauncey Billups (22)	Nenê (14)	Chauncey Billups (5)	Pepsi Center; 17,466	19–13
33	January 3	Houston	W 113–106	Carmelo Anthony (33)	Carmelo Anthony, Nenê (11)	Carmelo Anthony (5)	Pepsi Center; 17,136	20–13
34	January 5	@ L.A. Clippers	L 93–106	Carmelo Anthony (31)	Carmelo Anthony, Nenê (9)	J. R. Smith (4)	Staples Center; 17,540	20–14
35	January 6	@ Sacramento	L 102–122	Carmelo Anthony (26)	Nenê (8)	Ty Lawson, Nenê (3)	ARCO Arena; 13,184	20–15
36	January 9	New Orleans	L 87–96	Al Harrington (20)	Al Harrington (7)	Carmelo Anthony, J. R. Smith (4)	Pepsi Center; 16,283	20–16
37	January 11	Phoenix	W 132–98	Arron Afflalo (31)	Carmelo Anthony (10)	Chauncey Billups (7)	Pepsi Center; 14,874	21–16
38	January 13	Miami	W 130–102	J. R. Smith (28)	Nenê (9)	Chauncey Billups (13)	Pepsi Center; 19,155	22–16
39	January 15	Cleveland	W 127–99	Nenê (22)	Shelden Williams (11)	Chauncey Billups (8)	Pepsi Center; 17,668	23–16
40	January 16	@ San Antonio	L 97–110	Al Harrington (18)	Nenê (7)	Chauncey Billups, Nenê, J. R. Smith (4)	AT&T Center; 18,581	23–17
41	January 19	Oklahoma City	W 112–107	Carmelo Anthony (35)	Kenyon Martin (11)	Chauncey Billups (6)	Pepsi Center; 16,872	24–17
42	January 21	L.A. Lakers	L 97–107	Carmelo Anthony (23)	Nenê (7)	Carmelo Anthony (5)	Pepsi Center; 19,155	24–18
43	January 23	Indiana	W 121–107	Carmelo Anthony (36)	Nenê (10)	Chauncey Billups (6)	Pepsi Center; 17,047	25–18
44	January 25	@ Washington	W 120–109	Carmelo Anthony (23)	Nenê (9)	Chauncey Billups (6)	Verizon Center; 16,121	26–18
45	January 26	@ Detroit	W 109–100	Chauncey Billups (26)	Carmelo Anthony (10)	Carmelo Anthony (7)	The Palace of Auburn Hills; 16,212	27–18
46	January 28	@ Cleveland	W 117–103	Carmelo Anthony (33)	Kenyon Martin (9)	Carmelo Anthony, Ty Lawson (5)	Quicken Loans Arena; 19,642	28–18
47	January 30	@ Philadelphia	L 99–110	Chauncey Billups (27)	J. R. Smith (9)	Chauncey Billups (5)	Wells Fargo Center; 15,612	28–19
48	January 31	@ New Jersey	L 99–115	Carmelo Anthony (37)	Carmelo Anthony (9)	Chauncey Billups (5)	Prudential Center; 14,039	28–20

February: 7–6 (home: 5–2; road: 2–4)

Game	Date	Team	Score	High points	High rebounds	High assists	Location Attendance	Record
49	February 2	Portland	W 109–90	Nenê (22)	Nenê (10)	Chauncey Billups (5)	Pepsi Center; 15,258	29–20
50	February 4	Utah	L 106–113	Carmelo Anthony (31)	Arron Afflalo (10)	Chauncey Billups (5)	Pepsi Center; 19,155	29–21
51	February 5	@ Minnesota	W 113–100	Carmelo Anthony (25)	Al Harrington, J. R. Smith (7)	Chauncey Billups (13)	Target Center; 15,389	30–21
52	February 7	Houston	L 103–108	Carmelo Anthony (50)	Carmelo Anthony (11)	Ty Lawson (5)	Pepsi Center; 14,595	30–22
53	February 9	@ Golden State	L 114–116	Carmelo Anthony (29)	Al Harrington (8)	Ty Lawson, J. R. Smith (6)	Oracle Arena; 18,430	30–23
54	February 10	Dallas	W 121–120	Carmelo Anthony (42)	Carmelo Anthony, Nenê (7)	Chauncey Billups (9)	Pepsi Center; 16,273	31–23
55	February 13	@ Memphis	L 108–116	Carmelo Anthony (31)	Carmelo Anthony, Chris Andersen, Kenyon Martin (5)	Chauncey Billups (7)	FedExForum; 15,398	31–24
56	February 14	@ Houston	L 102–121	Arron Afflalo (17)	Nenê (9)	Carmelo Anthony, Chauncey Billups (3)	Toyota Center; 16,450	31–25
57	February 16	@ Milwaukee	W 94–87	Carmelo Anthony (38)	Carmelo Anthony (12)	Kenyon Martin (7)	Bradley Center; 16,033	32–25
All-Star Break
58	February 22	Memphis	W 120–107	J. R. Smith (26)	J. R. Smith (8)	Ty Lawson (7)	Pepsi Center; 14,638	33–25
59	February 24	Boston	W 89–75	Kenyon Martin (18)	Kenyon Martin, Nenê (10)	Ty Lawson (10)	Pepsi Center; 18,524	34–25
60	February 25	@ Portland	L 106–107 (OT)	Danilo Gallinari (30)	Nenê (11)	Raymond Felton, Ty Lawson (6)	Rose Garden; 20,659	34–26
61	February 28	Atlanta	W 100–90	J. R. Smith (19)	Kenyon Martin (11)	Raymond Felton (7)	Pepsi Center; 16,163	35–26

March: 10–3 (home: 6–0; road: 4–3)

Game	Date	Team	Score	High points	High rebounds	High assists	Location Attendance	Record
62	March 2	Charlotte	W 120–80	Wilson Chandler (16)	Kenyon Martin, Nenê (8)	Ty Lawson (10)	Pepsi Center; 14,255	36–26
63	March 3	@ Utah	W 103–101	Ty Lawson (22)	Kenyon Martin, Nenê (8)	Raymond Felton, Ty Lawson (5)	EnergySolutions Arena; 19,524	37–26
64	March 5	@ L.A. Clippers	L 94–100	Nenê (25)	Nenê (14)	Ty Lawson (8)	Staples Center; 19,060	37–27
65	March 10	@ Phoenix	W 116–97	Nenê (22)	Gary Forbes (9)	Ty Lawson (11)	US Airways Center; 17,465	38–27
66	March 12	Detroit	W 131–101	J. R. Smith (31)	Nenê (11)	Ty Lawson (11)	Pepsi Center; 19,155	39–27
67	March 14	@ New Orleans	W 114–103	Ty Lawson (23)	Nenê (13)	Raymond Felton (12)	New Orleans Arena; 11,782	40–27
68	March 16	@ Atlanta	W 102–87	Nenê (20)	Wilson Chandler (10)	Ty Lawson (10)	Philips Arena; 14,669	41–27
69	March 18	@ Orlando	L 82–85	Wilson Chandler (20)	Kenyon Martin (10)	Raymond Felton (7)	Amway Center; 19,113	41–28
70	March 19	@ Miami	L 98–103	J. R. Smith (27)	Kenyon Martin (8)	Ty Lawson (6)	American Airlines Arena; 19,600	41–29
71	March 21	Toronto	W 123–90	Ty Lawson (23)	J. R. Smith (10)	Ty Lawson, J. R. Smith (8)	Pepsi Center; 16,258	42–29
72	March 23	San Antonio	W 115–112	Al Harrington (27)	Nenê (10)	Raymond Felton (8)	Pepsi Center; 19,155	43–29
73	March 25	Washington	W 114–94	Chris Andersen, Danilo Gallinari, Al Harrington, Ty Lawson (17)	Chris Andersen (11)	Raymond Felton (8)	Pepsi Center; 19,308	44–29
74	March 30	Sacramento	W 104–90	Ty Lawson (20)	Nenê (15)	Raymond Felton (7)	Pepsi Center; 17,955	45–29

April: 5–3 (home: 2–1; road: 3–2)

Game	Date	Team	Score	High points	High rebounds	High assists	Location Attendance	Record
75	April 1	@ Sacramento	W 99–90	Raymond Felton (17)	Nenê (12)	Nenê (6)	Power Balance Pavilion; 15,871	46–29
76	April 3	@ L.A. Lakers	W 95–90	Danilo Gallinari (22)	Kenyon Martin (8)	Ty Lawson (8)	Staples Center; 18,997	47–29
77	April 5	Oklahoma City	L 94–101	Ty Lawson (28)	Nenê (8)	Ty Lawson (5)	Pepsi Center; 18,203	47–30
78	April 6	@ Dallas	W 104–96	J. R. Smith (23)	Nenê (15)	Ty Lawson (8)	American Airlines Center; 20,364	48–30
79	April 8	@ Oklahoma City	L 89–104	Nenê (18)	Kenyon Martin (13)	Ty Lawson (6)	Oklahoma City Arena; 18,203	48–31
80	April 9	Minnesota	W 130–106	Ty Lawson (37)	Kenyon Martin, J. R. Smith (8)	Raymond Felton (14)	Pepsi Center; 19,155	49–31
81	April 11	Golden State	W 134–111	J. R. Smith (22)	Chris Andersen (12)	Raymond Felton (10)	Pepsi Center; 19,155	50–31
82	April 13	@ Utah	L 103–107	Wilson Chandler (27)	Chris Andersen (10)	Wilson Chandler, Gary Forbes, Al Harrington, Ty Lawson, J. R. Smith (3)	EnergySolutions Arena; 19,051	50–32

2010–11 season schedule

== Playoffs ==
=== Game log ===
2011 playoff game log
First Round: 1–4 (home: 1–1; road: 0–3)

Game	Date	Team	Score	High points	High rebounds	High assists	Location Attendance	Series
1	April 17	@ Oklahoma City	L 103–107	Nenê (22)	Wilson Chandler, Nenê (8)	Raymond Felton (8)	Oklahoma City Arena; 18,203	0–1
2	April 20	@ Oklahoma City	L 89–106	Ty Lawson (20)	Nenê (9)	Ty Lawson (3)	Oklahoma City Arena; 18,203	0–2
3	April 23	Oklahoma City	L 94–97	Kenyon Martin, Nenê, J. R. Smith (15)	Nenê (10)	Raymond Felton, Ty Lawson, Nenê (4)	Pepsi Center; 19,958	0–3
4	April 25	Oklahoma City	W 104–101	Ty Lawson (27)	Kenyon Martin, Nenê (9)	Danilo Gallinari (4)	Pepsi Center; 19,155	1–3
5	April 27	@ Oklahoma City	L 97–100	Arron Afflalo (15)	Kenyon Martin (10)	Raymond Felton, Ty Lawson (4)	Oklahoma City Arena; 18,203	1–4

2011 playoff schedule

== Player statistics ==
Legend
GP	Games played	GS	Games started	MPG	Minutes per game
FG%	Field-goal percentage	3P%	3-point field-goal percentage	FT%	Free-throw percentage
RPG	Rebounds per game	APG	Assists per game	SPG	Steals per game
BPG	Blocks per game	PPG	Points per game

=== Season ===
Player	GP	GS	MPG	FG%	3P%	FT%	RPG	APG	SPG	BPG	PPG
Arron Afflalo	69	69	33.7	.498	.423	.847	3.60	2.4	.49	.45	12.6
Chris Andersen	45	0	16.3	.599	.000	.637	4.90	.4	.51	1.29	5.6
Carmelo Anthony^{‡}	50	50	35.5	.452	.333	.823	7.60	2.8	.86	.62	25.2
Renaldo Balkman^{‡}	5	0	8.8	.556	.000	.750	.80	.4	.60	.40	2.6
Chauncey Billups^{‡}	51	51	32.3	.438	.441	.923	2.50	5.3	1.02	.24	16.5
Anthony Carter^{‡}	14	0	10.9	.333	.333	1.000	.90	1.9	.64	.07	1.9
Wilson Chandler^{†}	21	19	30.6	.419	.347	.810	5.00	1.6	.67	1.14	12.5
Melvin Ely	30	2	12.2	.549	.000	.619	2.50	.5	.13	.37	2.3
Raymond Felton^{†}	21	0	31.6	.431	.459	.617	3.60	6.5	1.33	.00	11.5
Gary Forbes	63	11	12.6	.454	.328	.678	1.80	.8	.37	.10	5.2
Danilo Gallinari^{†}	14	12	30.9	.412	.370	.772	5.40	1.6	.93	.64	14.7
Al Harrington	73	3	22.8	.416	.357	.735	4.50	1.4	.53	.14	10.5
Kosta Koufos^{†}	11	1	8.9	.500	.000	.632	3.00	.0	.18	.45	4.9
Ty Lawson	80	31	26.3	.503	.404	.764	2.60	4.7	1.00	.05	11.7
Kenyon Martin	48	48	25.7	.511	.222	.583	6.20	2.3	.90	.73	8.6
Timofey Mozgov^{†}	11	0	6.0	.524	.000	.750	1.50	.0	.09	.18	2.5
Nenê	75	75	30.5	.615	.200	.711	7.60	2.0	1.12	.97	14.5
J.R. Smith	79	6	24.9	.435	.390	.738	4.10	2.2	1.16	.20	12.3
Shelden Williams^{‡}	42	32	17.0	.453	.000	.739	5.30	.5	.43	.52	4.7

^{†}Denotes player spent time with another team before joining Nuggets. Stats reflect time with Nuggets only.
^{‡}Traded mid-season. Stats reflect time with Nuggets only.

=== Playoffs ===
Player	GP	GS	MPG	FG%	3P%	FT%	RPG	APG	SPG	BPG	PPG
Arron Afflalo	3	3	28.3	.353	.250	.875	3.00	2.3	.00	.00	11.3
Chris Andersen	5	0	14.6	.636	.000	.714	2.80	.6	.60	1.40	4.8
Wilson Chandler	5	2	23.0	.276	.143	.778	4.40	.4	.60	.80	4.8
Raymond Felton	5	0	30.4	.360	.250	.750	1.80	4.2	1.20	.00	11.6
Gary Forbes	1	0	2.0	.000	.000	.000	1.00	.0	.00	.00	0.0
Danilo Gallinari	5	5	29.6	.432	.467	.714	3.40	2.0	.80	.00	12.0
Al Harrington	5	0	14.0	.455	.500	.750	1.40	1.0	.60	.00	5.6
Kosta Koufos	1	0	2.0	1.000	.000	.000	.00	.0	.00	.00	2.0
Ty Lawson	5	5	33.4	.500	.455	.913	3.40	3.8	1.00	.20	15.6
Kenyon Martin	5	5	29.6	.480	.000	.611	7.80	1.6	.40	.40	11.8
Nenê	5	5	32.4	.478	.000	.563	9.00	1.6	1.00	.80	14.2
J.R. Smith	5	0	15.2	.356	.429	.727	2.00	1.0	.40	.00	9.8

== Awards, records and milestones ==
=== Awards ===
==== All-Star ====
Carmelo Anthony represented the Nuggets at the 2011 NBA All-Star Game as a starter for the Western Conference. The All-Star game would end up being the last time 'Melo represented the Nuggets as he was traded the next day to the New York Knicks.

=== Milestones ===
- December 10: Seventh coach in history to 1,000 wins. Head coach George Karl became the seventh head coach in NBA history to win 1,000 games in the Nuggets' 123–116 road victory over the Toronto Raptors.

== Transactions ==
=== Trades ===
February 21, 2011

To Denver Nuggets----
- (United States) Wilson Chandler
- (Italy) Danilo Gallinari
- (United States) Raymond Felton
- (Russia) Timofey Mozgov
- (Greece) Kosta Koufos
- New York's 2014 first-round pick
- Golden State's 2012 second-round pick
- Golden State's 2013 second-round pick
- Cash Considerations
To New York Knicks----
- (United States) Carmelo Anthony
- (United States) Chauncey Billups
- (United States) Renaldo Balkman
- (United States) Shelden Williams
- (United States) Anthony Carter
- (United States) Corey Brewer
To Minnesota Timberwolves----
- (United States) Anthony Randolph
- (United States) Eddy Curry
- Denver's 2015 second-round pick

=== Free agents ===
==== Additions ====
Player	Signed	Former Team
Anthony Carter		Denver Nuggets
Shelden Williams		Boston Celtics
Al Harrington		New York Knicks

==== Subtractions ====
Player	Reason Left	New Team
Johan Petro	Free agent	New Jersey Nets
