= 2010–11 Sacramento Kings season =

NBA professional basketball team season

- Head coach: Paul Westphal
- General manager: Geoff Petrie
- Owners: Maloof family
- Arena: ARCO Arena/Power Balance Pavilion

Results
- Record: 24–58 (.293)
- Place: Division: 5th (Pacific); Conference: 14th (Western)
- Playoff finish: Did not qualify
- Stats at Basketball Reference

Local media
- Television: CSN California, KXTV
- Radio: KHTK

The 2010–11 Sacramento Kings season was the 66th season of the franchise, its 26th season in Sacramento, and its 62nd season in the National Basketball Association (NBA).

== Key dates ==
- June 24 – The 2010 NBA draft was held in New York City.
- July 1 – The free agency period began.

== Draft picks ==
Round	Pick	Player	Position	Nationality	College
1	5	DeMarcus Cousins	Center	United States	Kentucky
2	33	Hassan Whiteside	Center	United States	Marshall

== Roster ==
Sacramento Kings roster
Players

Pos.	No.	Player	Height	Weight	DOB	From
F	18	Omri Casspi	6 ft 9 in (2.06 m)	225 lb (102 kg)		Israel
C	15	DeMarcus Cousins	6 ft 11 in (2.11 m)	270 lb (122 kg)		Kentucky
F/C	10	Samuel Dalembert	6 ft 11 in (2.11 m)	255 lb (116 kg)		Seton Hall
G/F	8	Marquis Daniels (injured)	6 ft 6 in (1.98 m)	200 lb (91 kg)		Auburn
G/F	13	Tyreke Evans	6 ft 6 in (1.98 m)	220 lb (100 kg)		Memphis
G/F	32	Francisco García	6 ft 7 in (2.01 m)	195 lb (88 kg)		Louisville
F	20	Donté Greene	6 ft 11 in (2.11 m)	226 lb (103 kg)		Syracuse
F	41	Darnell Jackson	6 ft 9 in (2.06 m)	253 lb (115 kg)		Kansas
G	5	Eugene Jeter	5 ft 11 in (1.80 m)	175 lb (79 kg)		Portland
G	3	Jermaine Taylor	6 ft 4 in (1.93 m)	210 lb (95 kg)		Central Florida
F/C	34	Jason Thompson	6 ft 11 in (2.11 m)	250 lb (113 kg)		Rider
G	23	Marcus Thornton	6 ft 4 in (1.93 m)	205 lb (93 kg)		LSU
G	19	Beno Udrih	6 ft 3 in (1.91 m)	205 lb (93 kg)		Slovenia
C	33	Hassan Whiteside	7 ft 0 in (2.13 m)	265 lb (120 kg)		Marshall

Coaches
Head coach
- Paul Westphal (USC)
Assistant(s)
- Pete Carril (Lafayette)
- Mario Elie (American International)
- Jim Eyen (UC Santa Barbara)
- Otis Hughley (West Alabama)
- Truck Robinson (Tennessee State)

Legend
- (DP) Unsigned draft pick
- (FA) Free agent
- (S) Suspended
- Injured

Roster

=== Roster notes ===
- Marquis Daniels did not suit up for any of the Kings' games, but he was on the team roster at the end of the season.

== Pre-season ==
=== Game log ===
2010 pre-season game log
Pre-season: 3–4 (home: 2–1; road: 1–3)

Game	Date	Team	Score	High points	High rebounds	High assists	Location Attendance	Record
1	October 5	Phoenix	W 109–95	Tyreke Evans (26)	DeMarcus Cousins (16)	Tyreke Evans (5)	ARCO Arena; 9,485	1–0
2	October 7	L.A. Clippers	L 88–120	DeMarcus Cousins (15)	Jason Thompson, Omri Casspi, Carl Landry (5)	Jason Thompson (3)	ARCO Arena; 10,284	1–1
3	October 10	@ Golden State	L 86–95	DeMarcus Cousins (17)	Jason Thompson (12)	Francisco García, Omri Casspi, Luther Head (4)	Oracle Arena; 10,537	1–2
4	October 12	Golden State	W 116–97	DeMarcus Cousins (20)	Omri Casspi (9)	Eugene Jeter (7)	Oracle Arena; 10,786	2–2
5	October 13	@ L.A. Lakers	L 95–98	Carl Landry (23)	DeMarcus Cousins (10)	Tyreke Evans (8)	Thomas & Mack Center; 15,134	2–3
6	October 19	@ L.A. Clippers	W 96–94	Omri Casspi, Tyreke Evans (17)	Omri Casspi (8)	Tyreke Evans (7)	Staples Center; 10,838	3–3
7	October 22	@ Utah	L 71–82	Beno Udrih (17)	Donté Greene, Jason Thompson, Carl Landry (6)	Tyreke Evans (8)	EnergySolutions Arena; 19,505	3–4

2010–11 season schedule

== Regular season ==
=== Standings ===
Pacific Division	W	L	PCT	GB	Home	Road	Div
y-Los Angeles Lakers	57	25	.695	–	30–11	27–14	12–4
Phoenix Suns	40	42	.488	17	23–18	17–24	9–7
Golden State Warriors	36	46	.439	21	26–15	10–31	5–11
Los Angeles Clippers	32	50	.390	25	23–18	9–32	7–9
Sacramento Kings	24	58	.293	33	11–30	13–28	7–9

#	Western Conference				
#	Team	W	L	PCT	GB
1	c-San Antonio Spurs	61	21	.744	–
2	y-Los Angeles Lakers	57	25	.695	4
3	x-Dallas Mavericks	57	25	.695	4
4	y-Oklahoma City Thunder	55	27	.671	6
5	x-Denver Nuggets	50	32	.610	11
6	x-Portland Trail Blazers	48	34	.585	13
7	x-New Orleans Hornets	46	36	.561	15
8	x-Memphis Grizzlies	46	36	.561	15
9	Houston Rockets	43	39	.524	18
10	Phoenix Suns	40	42	.488	21
11	Utah Jazz	39	43	.476	22
12	Golden State Warriors	36	46	.439	25
13	Los Angeles Clippers	32	50	.390	29
14	Sacramento Kings	24	58	.293	37
15	Minnesota Timberwolves	17	65	.207	44

=== Game log ===
2010–11 game log
Total: 24–58 (Home: 11–30; Road: 13–28)
October: 2–1 (home: 0–0; road: 2–1)

Game	Date	Team	Score	High points	High rebounds	High assists	Location Attendance	Record
1	October 27	@ Minnesota	W 117–116	Francisco García, Carl Landry (22)	Carl Landry (11)	Beno Udrih (6)	Target Center; 17,067	1–0
2	October 29	@ New Jersey	L 100–106	Tyreke Evans, Francisco García (18)	Darnell Jackson (6)	Tyreke Evans (7)	Prudential Center; 13.482	1–1
3	October 30	@ Cleveland	W 107–104	Tyreke Evans (21)	DeMarcus Cousins (10)	Beno Udrih (11)	Quicken Loans Arena; 20,562	2–1

November: 2–11 (home: 2–8; road: 0–3)

Game	Date	Team	Score	High points	High rebounds	High assists	Location Attendance	Record
4	November 1	Toronto	W 111–108	Tyreke Evans (23)	Samuel Dalembert (14)	Tyreke Evans (5)	ARCO Arena; 17,317	3–1
5	November 3	L.A. Lakers	L 100–112	Tyreke Evans (21)	Samuel Dalembert, Jason Thompson (10)	Beno Udrih (8)	ARCO Arena; 16,113	3–2
6	November 6	Memphis	L 91–100	Tyreke Evans (30)	Samuel Dalembert (12)	Tyreke Evans (5)	ARCO Arena; 14,085	3–3
7	November 10	Minnesota	L 89–98	Omri Casspi (17)	Samuel Dalembert (9)	Tyreke Evans, Beno Udrih (9)	ARCO Arena; 12,433	3–4
8	November 12	@ Phoenix	L 89–103	Carl Landry (20)	Carl Landry (11)	Tyreke Evans (9)	US Airways Center; 18,029	3–5
9	November 14	Detroit	L 94–100	Tyreke Evans (20)	DeMarcus Cousins, Carl Landry (8)	Beno Udrih (9)	ARCO Arena; 12,377	3–6
10	November 17	New York	L 106–113	Tyreke Evans (23)	DeMarcus Cousins (10)	Tyreke Evans (5)	ARCO Arena; 12,817	3–7
11	November 19	New Jersey	W 86–81	Tyreke Evans (20)	DeMarcus Cousins (10)	Tyreke Evans (4)	ARCO Arena; 11,766	4–7
12	November 21	New Orleans	L 71–75	Donté Greene (15)	Samuel Dalembert, Donté Greene (10)	Tyreke Evans (5)	ARCO Arena; 12,003	4–8
13	November 22	@ Utah	L 83–94	DeMarcus Cousins (18)	DeMarcus Cousins, Samuel Dalembert (9)	Tyreke Evans, Luther Head, Pooh Jeter (4)	EnergySolutions Arena; 18,698	4–9
14	November 25	@ L.A. Clippers	L 82–100	Carl Landry (18)	DeMarcus Cousins, Carl Landry (6)	Luther Head (7)	Staples Center; 11,504	4–10
15	November 27	Chicago	L 85–96	Jason Thompson (18)	Jason Thompson (9)	Tyreke Evans (9)	ARCO Arena; 13,504	4–11
16	November 30	Indiana	L 98–107	Beno Udrih (24)	Samuel Dalembert (12)	Tyreke Evans (9)	ARCO Arena; 10,927	4–12

December: 2–11 (home: 2–6; road: 0–5)

Game	Date	Team	Score	High points	High rebounds	High assists	Location Attendance	Record
17	December 3	@ L.A. Lakers	L 80–113	Jason Thompson (19)	Jason Thompson (10)	Omri Casspi (4)	Staples Center; 18,997	4–13
18	December 4	Dallas	L 103–105	Tyreke Evans (25)	DeMarcus Cousins (11)	Tyreke Evans (8)	ARCO Arena; 12,900	4–14
19	December 6	@ L.A. Clippers	L 91–98	Omri Casspi (21)	Samuel Dalembert (11)	DeMarcus Cousins, Tyreke Evans, Beno Udrih (3)	Staples Center; 14,964	4–15
20	December 8	Washington	W 116–91	Beno Udrih (23)	Jason Thompson (14)	Pooh Jeter (9)	ARCO Arena; 12,308	5–15
21	December 11	Miami	L 83–104	Omri Casspi (20)	Samuel Dalembert (11)	Beno Udrih (7)	ARCO Arena; 16,396	5–16
22	December 14	@ Houston	L 105–118	DeMarcus Cousins, Carl Landry (17)	Jason Thompson (10)	Pooh Jeter, Beno Udrih (6)	Toyota Center; 13,414	5–17
23	December 15	@ New Orleans	L 91–94	Tyreke Evans (22)	DeMarcus Cousins (7)	Tyreke Evans (7)	New Orleans Arena; 13,325	5–18
24	December 17	@ Oklahoma City	L 87–102	Tyreke Evans (22)	DeMarcus Cousins (16)	Tyreke Evans (6)	Oklahoma City Arena; 18,203	5–19
25	December 19	Houston	L 93–102	DeMarcus Cousins (19)	DeMarcus Cousins (8)	Beno Udrih (7)	ARCO Arena; 13,599	5–20
26	December 21	Golden State	L 109–117 (OT)	Beno Udrih (34)	DeMarcus Cousins (13)	Tyreke Evans (7)	ARCO Arena; 13,740	5–21
27	December 23	Milwaukee	L 79–84	Beno Udrih (17)	Samuel Dalembert, Carl Landry (12)	Beno Udrih (5)	ARCO Arena; 12,360	5–22
28	December 27	L.A. Clippers	L 99–100	Tyreke Evans (32)	DeMarcus Cousins (9)	Beno Udrih (6)	ARCO Arena; 14,590	5–23
29	December 29	Memphis	W 100–98	Beno Udrih (24)	DeMarcus Cousins (16)	Beno Udrih (6)	ARCO Arena; 12,636	6–23

January: 6–10 (home: 3–3; road: 3–7)

Game	Date	Team	Score	High points	High rebounds	High assists	Location Attendance	Record
30	January 1	@ Denver	L 86–104	Jason Thompson (17)	DeMarcus Cousins (8)	Tyreke Evans (5)	Pepsi Center; 17,466	6–24
31	January 2	Phoenix	W 94–89	DeMarcus Cousins (28)	Carl Landry (12)	DeMarcus Cousins (6)	ARCO Arena; 12,500	7–24
32	January 4	Atlanta	L 102–108	Tyreke Evans (29)	Omri Casspi (11)	Tyreke Evans (8)	ARCO Arena; 11,472	7–25
33	January 6	Denver	W 122–102	Tyreke Evans (27)	Omri Casspi, DeMarcus Cousins (6)	Tyreke Evans (12)	ARCO Arena; 13,184	8–25
34	January 9	@ Toronto	L 112–118	Beno Udrih (25)	Jason Thompson (11)	Pooh Jeter (6)	Air Canada Centre; 17,206	8–26
35	January 11	@ Washington	L 133–136 (OT)	Francisco García, Beno Udrih (26)	Omri Casspi, DeMarcus Cousins (8)	Pooh Jeter (11)	Verizon Center; 16,226	8–27
36	January 12	@ Boston	L 95–119	Carl Landry (17)	Jason Thompson (9)	Beno Udrih (5)	TD Garden; 18,624	8–28
37	January 14	@ New York	W 93–83	Beno Udrih (29)	DeMarcus Cousins (10)	Beno Udrih (4)	Madison Square Garden; 19,763	9–28
38	January 15	@ Detroit	L 106–110	Tyreke Evans (25)	DeMarcus Cousins (8)	Tyreke Evans (11)	The Palace of Auburn Hills; 18,784	9–29
39	January 17	@ Atlanta	L 98–100	DeMarcus Cousins (20)	Donté Greene (11)	Samuel Dalembert (4)	Philips Arena; 14,820	9–30
40	January 19	Portland	L 90–94 (OT)	Beno Udrih (20)	Samuel Dalembert (12)	Tyreke Evans (8)	ARCO Arena; 12,722	9–31
41	January 21	@ Golden State	L 112–119 (OT)	Tyreke Evans (35)	Jason Thompson (12)	Beno Udrih (7)	Oracle Arena; 18,428	9–32
42	January 24	@ Portland	W 96–81	Tyreke Evans (26)	DeMarcus Cousins, Carl Landry (8)	Tyreke Evans (6)	Rose Garden; 20,488	10–32
43	January 25	Charlotte	L 89–94	Tyreke Evans, Carl Landry (19)	Omri Casspi, Tyreke Evans, Jason Thompson (8)	Tyreke Evans (5)	ARCO Arena; 13,984	10–33
44	January 28	@ L.A. Lakers	W 100–95	DeMarcus Cousins (27)	DeMarcus Cousins, Carl Landry (10)	Beno Udrih (7)	Staples Center; 18,997	11–33
45	January 29	New Orleans	W 102–96	DeMarcus Cousins (25)	DeMarcus Cousins (12)	DeMarcus Cousins (7)	ARCO Arena; 14,534	12–33

February: 3–10 (home: 1–5; road: 2–5)

Game	Date	Team	Score	High points	High rebounds	High assists	Location Attendance	Record
46	February 1	Boston	L 90–95	DeMarcus Cousins, Tyreke Evans (20)	Omri Casspi, Samuel Dalembert (7)	Beno Udrih (6)	ARCO Arena; 16,482	12–34
47	February 4	San Antonio	L 100–113	Tyreke Evans (25)	DeMarcus Cousins (10)	Pooh Jeter (6)	ARCO Arena; 15,772	12–35
48	February 7	Utah	L 104–107	DeMarcus Cousins (25)	DeMarcus Cousins (14)	Tyreke Evans, Jason Thompson (4)	ARCO Arena; 11,509	12–36
49	February 9	Dallas	L 100–102	Samuel Dalembert (20)	DeMarcus Cousins (15)	Tyreke Evans (9)	ARCO Arena; 12,310	12–37
50	February 12	Oklahoma City	L 97–99	Tyreke Evans (30)	DeMarcus Cousins (12)	Beno Udrih (7)	ARCO Arena; 14,987	12–38
51	February 13	@ Phoenix	W 113–108	Tyreke Evans (21)	Samuel Dalembert (15)	Tyreke Evans, Beno Udrih (7)	US Airways Center; 17,798	13–38
52	February 15	@ Oklahoma City	L 96–126	DeMarcus Cousins (21)	DeMarcus Cousins (13)	Pooh Jeter (7)	Oklahoma City Arena; 18,087	13–39
53	February 16	@ Dallas	L 100–116	Jermaine Taylor (17)	DeMarcus Cousins (12)	Beno Udrih (7)	American Airlines Center; 20,420	13–40
All-Star Break
54	February 22	@ Miami	L 97–117	Samuel Dalembert (18)	Samuel Dalembert (13)	DeMarcus Cousins, Pooh Jeter, Beno Udrih (4)	American Airlines Arena; 19,754	13–41
55	February 23	@ Orlando	W 111–105	Jermaine Taylor (21)	Samuel Dalembert (9)	Beno Udrih (10)	Amway Center; 19,146	14–41
56	February 25	@ Charlotte	L 98–110	Samuel Dalembert (18)	Jason Thompson (13)	Beno Udrih (13)	Time Warner Cable Arena; 15,782	14–42
57	February 26	@ Memphis	L 92–120	Beno Udrih (24)	Omri Casspi, Samuel Dalembert (8)	Jason Thompson, Beno Udrih (5)	FedExForum; 16,028	14–43
58	February 28	L.A. Clippers	W 105–99	Marcus Thornton (29)	Samuel Dalembert (10)	Beno Udrih (7)	ARCO Arena; 17,317	15–43

March: 6–10 (home: 2–5; road: 4–5)

Game	Date	Team	Score	High points	High rebounds	High assists	Location Attendance	Record
59	March 2	Portland	L 102–107	DeMarcus Cousins (28)	DeMarcus Cousins (11)	Beno Udrih (8)	Power Balance Pavilion; 12,286	15–44
60	March 5	@ Utah	L 102–109 (OT)	Marcus Thornton (22)	DeMarcus Cousins (18)	DeMarcus Cousins (7)	EnergySolutions Arena; 19,911	15–45
61	March 7	Houston	L 101–123	DeMarcus Cousins (20)	Samuel Dalembert (12)	Marcus Thornton, Beno Udrih (4)	Power Balance Pavilion; 12,561	15–46
62	March 9	Orlando	L 102–106	DeMarcus Cousins (29)	Samuel Dalembert (10)	Marcus Thornton (5)	Power Balance Pavilion; 12,728	15–47
63	March 11	@ San Antonio	L 103–108	Omri Casspi, Jermaine Taylor (16)	DeMarcus Cousins (11)	Marcus Thornton (6)	AT&T Center; 18,712	15–48
64	March 12	@ New Orleans	L 103–115	Marcus Thornton (25)	DeMarcus Cousins (11)	Pooh Jeter (7)	New Orleans Arena; 15,530	15–49
65	March 14	Golden State	W 129–119	Marcus Thornton (42)	Samuel Dalembert (16)	Beno Udrih (9)	Power Balance Pavilion; 14,243	16–49
66	March 16	Cleveland	L 93–97	Marcus Thornton (23)	DeMarcus Cousins (16)	Beno Udrih (8)	Power Balance Pavilion; 13,477	16–50
67	March 18	Philadelphia	L 80–102	DeMarcus Cousins (19)	Samuel Dalembert (13)	Beno Udrih (5)	Power Balance Pavilion; 15,373	16–51
68	March 20	@ Minnesota	W 127–95	Samuel Dalembert (26)	Samuel Dalembert (17)	Marcus Thornton (9)	Target Center; 18,993	17–51
69	March 21	@ Chicago	L 92–132	Marcus Thornton (25)	DeMarcus Cousins (8)	Beno Udrih (5)	United Center; 21,873	17–52
70	March 23	@ Milwaukee	W 97–90	Marcus Thornton (27)	Samuel Dalembert (12)	Beno Udrih (6)	Bradley Center; 14,122	18–52
71	March 25	@ Indiana	W 110–93	DeMarcus Cousins (18)	DeMarcus Cousins (14)	Tyreke Evans (8)	Conseco Fieldhouse; 13,813	19–52
72	March 27	@ Philadelphia	W 114–111 (OT)	Marcus Thornton (32)	Samuel Dalembert (19)	DeMarcus Cousins (6)	Wells Fargo Center; 16,235	20–52
73	March 29	Phoenix	W 116–113	Marcus Thornton (24)	Marcus Thornton (11)	DeMarcus Cousins, Tyreke Evans (8)	Power Balance Pavilion; 13,774	21–52
74	March 30	@ Denver	L 90–104	Marcus Thornton (27)	Samuel Dalembert, Jason Thompson (6)	Beno Udrih (10)	Pepsi Center; 17,955	21–53

April: 3–5 (home: 1–3; road: 2–2)

Game	Date	Team	Score	High points	High rebounds	High assists	Location Attendance	Record
75	April 1	Denver	L 90–99	Francisco García (17)	Samuel Dalembert (12)	DeMarcus Cousins, Marcus Thornton (5)	Power Balance Pavilion; 15,871	21–54
76	April 3	Utah	W 106–97	Tyreke Evans (24)	DeMarcus Cousins (9)	Tyreke Evans (10)	Power Balance Pavilion; 17,215	22–54
77	April 5	@ Houston	W 104–101	Samuel Dalembert, Marcus Thornton (21)	DeMarcus Cousins, Samuel Dalembert (15)	Tyreke Evans (5)	Toyota Center; 15,523	23–54
78	April 6	@ San Antonio	L 92–124	Tyreke Evans (16)	DeMarcus Cousins (11)	Tyreke Evans, Beno Udrih (5)	AT&T Center; 18,590	23–55
79	April 8	@ Memphis	L 96–101	Marcus Thornton (18)	Samuel Dalembert (16)	Tyreke Evans (6)	FedExForum; 16,517	23–56
80	April 10	@ Golden State	W 104–103	Marcus Thornton (21)	Samuel Dalembert (14)	Beno Udrih (6)	Oracle Arena; 19,596	24–56
81	April 11	Oklahoma City	L 112–120	DeMarcus Cousins (30)	DeMarcus Cousins, Samuel Dalembert, Marcus Thornton (9)	Beno Udrih (7)	Power Balance Pavilion; 15,683	24–57
82	April 13	L.A. Lakers	L 108–116 (OT)	Marcus Thornton (33)	Samuel Dalembert (18)	Tyreke Evans (7)	Power Balance Pavilion; 17,641	24–58

2010–11 season schedule

== Player statistics ==
Legend
GP	Games played	GS	Games started	MPG	Minutes per game
FG%	Field-goal percentage	3P%	3-point field-goal percentage	FT%	Free-throw percentage
RPG	Rebounds per game	APG	Assists per game	SPG	Steals per game
BPG	Blocks per game	PPG	Points per game

=== Regular season ===
Player	GP	GS	MPG	FG%	3P%	FT%	RPG	APG	SPG	BPG	PPG
DeMarcus Cousins	81	62	28.5	.430	.167	.687	8.6	2.5	1.0	.8	14.1
Samuel Dalembert	80	46	24.2	.473	.000	.730	8.2	.8	.5	1.5	8.1
Beno Udrih	79	64	34.6	.500	.357	.864	3.4	4.9	1.2	.1	13.7
Jason Thompson	75	39	23.3	.507	.000	.605	6.1	1.2	.4	.6	8.8
Omri Casspi	71	27	24.0	.412	.372	.673	4.3	1.0	.8	.2	8.6
Donté Greene	69	21	16.3	.404	.292	.662	2.1	.7	.5	.3	5.8
Eugene Jeter	62	1	13.8	.409	.200	.902	1.1	2.6	.5	.0	4.1
Darnell Jackson	59	2	8.2	.487	.273	.612	1.6	.2	.2	.1	3.2
Francisco García	58	34	23.9	.436	.362	.855	2.3	1.2	.9	.8	9.7
Tyreke Evans	57	53	37.0	.409	.291	.771	4.8	5.6	1.5	.5	17.8
Carl Landry^{†}	53	16	26.5	.492	.000	.721	4.8	.9	.6	.4	11.9
Luther Head	36	14	16.3	.415	.391	.780	1.7	1.9	.3	.3	5.6
Marcus Thornton^{†}	27	23	38.1	.450	.361	.805	4.7	3.4	1.7	.2	21.3
Jermaine Taylor^{†}	26	8	15.6	.476	.300	.727	2.0	1.2	.5	.1	7.1
Antoine Wright	7	0	4.4	.125	.000		.4	.0	.1	.0	.3
Hassan Whiteside	1	0	2.0				.0	.0	.0	.0	.0

- ^{†} Denotes player spent time with another team in the season. Stats reflect time with the Kings only.

== Transactions ==
=== Trades ===
June 17, 2010
To Philadelphia 76ers

- Andrés Nocioni,
  (United States) Spencer Hawes
To Sacramento Kings

- Samuel Dalembert
July 21, 2010
To Milwaukee Bucks

- Jon Brockman
To Sacramento Kings

- Darnell Jackson
  2011 second-round pick
December 15, 2010
To Houston Rockets

- Future second-round pick
To Sacramento Kings

- Jermaine Taylor
- Cash considerations
February 23, 2011
To New Orleans Hornets

- Carl Landry
To Sacramento Kings

- Marcus Thornton
- Cash considerations
February 24, 2011
To Boston Celtics

- 2017 second-round pick
To Sacramento Kings

- Marquis Daniels
- Cash considerations

=== Free agents ===
Additions
Player	Date signed	Former team
Antoine Wright	July 23	Toronto Raptors
Eugene Jeter	July 23	Hapoel Jerusalem

Subtractions
Player	Date signed	New team
Sean May	August 10	New Jersey Nets
Ime Udoka	November 24	San Antonio Spurs
Luther Head	N/A	N/A
