= 2010–11 Phoenix Suns season =

Professional basketball season

- Head coach: Alvin Gentry
- President: Lon Babby
- General manager: Lance Blanks
- Owner: Robert Sarver
- Arena: US Airways Center

Results
- Record: 40–42 (.488)
- Place: Division: 2nd (Pacific); Conference: 10th (Western)
- Playoff finish: Did not qualify
- Stats at Basketball Reference

Local media
- Television: Fox Sports Arizona, KUTP
- Radio: KTAR

The 2010–11 Phoenix Suns season was the 43rd season for the Phoenix Suns of the National Basketball Association (NBA). For the first time in eight seasons, the Suns were without the play of power forward Amar'e Stoudemire, a 5-time All-Star and former Rookie of the Year who joined the New York Knicks in the summer. The Suns traded Jason Richardson on December 18, 2010, as part of a trade that brought Vince Carter to the Suns. On February 24, 2011, the Suns traded Goran Dragić and the draft pick they got earlier from Orlando in exchange for Aaron Brooks. Alvin Gentry was head coach and the Suns played their home games at US Airways Center.

== Key dates ==
- June 24, 2010 – The 2010 NBA draft was held in New York City.
- July 1, 2010 – The free agency period begun.
- July 11, 2010 – The Suns traded with the Atlanta Hawks and the Toronto Raptors.
- July 12, 2010 – The Suns announced Lon Babby as their newest vice president for basketball operations.
- August 5, 2010 – The Suns announced Lance Blanks as their newest general manager, hiring him over Jeff Bower, Tommy Sheppard, Jeff Weltman, and Ronnie Lester.
- December 18, 2010 – The Suns traded Jason Richardson, Hedo Türkoğlu, and Earl Clark to the Orlando Magic for Vince Carter, Mickaël Piétrus, Marcin Gortat, their 2011 first-round draft pick and cash.
- February 24, 2011 – The Suns traded Goran Dragić and a lottery protected 2011 draft pick to the Houston Rockets for Aaron Brooks.

== Offseason ==
=== NBA draft ===
Round	Pick	Player	Position	Nationality	College
2	46	Gani Lawal	Forward	United States	Georgia Tech
2	60	Dwayne Collins	Forward	United States	Miami (FL)

=== Free agency ===
Amar'e Stoudemire opted out of his final year of his contract and became an unrestricted free agent. He was to be paid $17.7 million. He later joined the New York Knicks.

Channing Frye re-signed with Phoenix on a 5-year, $30 million contract on July 1. One day later, the Suns signed power forward Hakim Warrick to a 4-year, $16 million contract. At the same time, Phoenix ended up trading Leandro Barbosa and Dwayne Jones to the Toronto Raptors in exchange for Hedo Türkoğlu.

== Roster ==
2010–11 Phoenix Suns roster
Players

Pos.	No.	Player	Height	Weight	DOB	From
PG	0	Aaron Brooks	6 ft 0 in (1.83 m)	161 lb (73 kg)	1985-01-14	Oregon
SG	25	Vince Carter	6 ft 6 in (1.98 m)	220 lb (100 kg)	1977-01-26	North Carolina
SF	1	Josh Childress	6 ft 8 in (2.03 m)	210 lb (95 kg)	1983-06-20	Stanford
PG	22	Zabian Dowdell	6 ft 3 in (1.91 m)	191 lb (87 kg)	1984-09-10	Virginia Tech
SF	3	Jared Dudley	6 ft 7 in (2.01 m)	225 lb (102 kg)	1985-07-10	Boston College
PF	8	Channing Frye	6 ft 11 in (2.11 m)	245 lb (111 kg)	1983-05-17	Arizona
C	4	Marcin Gortat	6 ft 11 in (2.11 m)	240 lb (109 kg)	1984-02-17	Poland
SF	33	Grant Hill	6 ft 8 in (2.03 m)	225 lb (102 kg)	1972-10-05	Duke
PF	31	Gani Lawal	6 ft 9 in (2.06 m)	233 lb (106 kg)	1988-11-07	Georgia Tech
C	15	Robin Lopez	7 ft 0 in (2.13 m)	255 lb (116 kg)	1988-04-01	Stanford
PG	13	Steve Nash	6 ft 3 in (1.91 m)	178 lb (81 kg)	1974-02-07	Santa Clara
SG	12	Mickaël Piétrus	6 ft 6 in (1.98 m)	215 lb (98 kg)	1982-02-07	France
C	20	Garret Siler	6 ft 11 in (2.11 m)	305 lb (138 kg)	1986-10-25	Augusta State
PF	21	Hakim Warrick	6 ft 9 in (2.06 m)	219 lb (99 kg)	1982-07-08	Syracuse

Coaches
Head coach
- Alvin Gentry
Assistant(s)
- Bill Cartwright
- Noel Gillespie
- Igor Kokoškov
- Dan Majerle

Legend
- (DP) Unsigned draft pick
- (FA) Free agent
- (S) Suspended
- Injured

Roster
Updated: February 24, 2011

== Regular season ==
=== Standings ===
Pacific Division	W	L	PCT	GB	Home	Road	Div
y-Los Angeles Lakers	57	25	.695	–	30–11	27–14	12–4
Phoenix Suns	40	42	.488	17	23–18	17–24	9–7
Golden State Warriors	36	46	.439	21	26–15	10–31	5–11
Los Angeles Clippers	32	50	.390	25	23–18	9–32	7–9
Sacramento Kings	24	58	.293	33	11–30	13–28	7–9

#	Western Conference				
#	Team	W	L	PCT	GB
1	c-San Antonio Spurs	61	21	.744	–
2	y-Los Angeles Lakers	57	25	.695	4
3	x-Dallas Mavericks	57	25	.695	4
4	y-Oklahoma City Thunder	55	27	.671	6
5	x-Denver Nuggets	50	32	.610	11
6	x-Portland Trail Blazers	48	34	.585	13
7	x-New Orleans Hornets	46	36	.561	15
8	x-Memphis Grizzlies	46	36	.561	15
9	Houston Rockets	43	39	.524	18
10	Phoenix Suns	40	42	.488	21
11	Utah Jazz	39	43	.476	22
12	Golden State Warriors	36	46	.439	25
13	Los Angeles Clippers	32	50	.390	29
14	Sacramento Kings	24	58	.293	37
15	Minnesota Timberwolves	17	65	.207	44

=== Game log ===
2010 pre-season game log
Pre-season: 2–6 (home: 2–3; road: 0–3)

Game	Date	Team	Score	High points	High rebounds	High assists	Location Attendance	Record
1	October 5	@ Sacramento	L 95–109	Jason Richardson (17)	Robin Lopez (6)	Chucky Atkins (4)	ARCO Arena; 9,485	0–1
2	October 8	Toronto	L 78–129	Jared Dudley (10)	Hedo Türkoğlu (8)	Steve Nash (7)	General Motors Place; 18,123	0–2
3	October 9	Dallas	W 98–90	Grant Hill (16)	Robin Lopez (6)	Steve Nash (10)	Indian Wells Tennis Garden; 15,617	1–2
4	October 12	Utah	L 100–105	Goran Dragić (15)	Josh Childress (8)	Steve Nash (10)	US Airways Center; 12,410	1–3
5	October 14	@ Utah	L 97–108	Hedo Türkoğlu (13)	Jason Richardson, Garret Siler (7)	Steve Nash (5)	EnergySolutions Arena; 19,883	1–4
6	October 17	@ Toronto	L 100–121	Steve Nash (16)	Steve Nash (7)	Steve Nash (6)	Air Canada Centre; 12,902	1–5
7	October 19	Golden State	W 92–87	Steve Nash (18)	Robin Lopez (10)	Steve Nash, Goran Dragić (4)	US Airways Center; 14,635	2–5
8	October 22	Denver	L 106–144	Jared Dudley (17)	Robin Lopez (7)	Steve Nash (12)	US Airways Center; 15,440	2–6

2010–11 season schedule

2010–11 game log
Total: 40–42 (Home: 23–18; Road: 17–24)
October: 1–2 (home: 0–1; road: 1–1)

Game	Date	Team	Score	High points	High rebounds	High assists	Location Attendance	Record
1	October 26	@ Portland	L 92–106	Steve Nash (26)	Channing Frye, Jason Richardson (6)	Steve Nash (6)	Rose Garden; 20,603	0–1
2	October 28	@ Utah	W 110–94	Hakim Warrick, Steve Nash (18)	Grant Hill (12)	Goran Dragić (6)	EnergySolutions Arena; 19,911	1–1
3	October 29	L.A. Lakers	L 106–114	Grant Hill (21)	Robin Lopez (14)	Steve Nash (9)	US Airways Center; 18,422	1–2

November: 7–7 (home: 4–2; road: 3–5)

Game	Date	Team	Score	High points	High rebounds	High assists	Location Attendance	Record
4	November 3	San Antonio	L 110–112	Jason Richardson (21)	Grant Hill (8)	Goran Dragić (8)	US Airways Center; 17,060	1–3
5	November 5	Memphis	W 123–118 (2OT)	Jason Richardson (38)	Channing Frye (11)	Steve Nash (9)	US Airways Center; 16,470	2–3
6	November 7	@ Atlanta	W 118–114	Jason Richardson (21)	Jared Dudley, Grant Hill, Josh Childress (6)	Steve Nash (15)	Philips Arena; 13,395	3–3
7	November 8	@ Memphis	L 99–109	Grant Hill (19)	Grant Hill (12)	Steve Nash (11)	FedExForum; 10,786	3–4
8	November 12	Sacramento	W 103–89	Steve Nash (28)	Jason Richardson (8)	Steve Nash (14)	US Airways Center; 18,029	4–4
9	November 14	@ L.A. Lakers	W 121–116	Jason Richardson (35)	Jason Richardson (8)	Steve Nash (13)	Staples Center; 18,997	5–4
10	November 15	Denver	W 100–94	Hakim Warrick (21)	Josh Childress (8)	Steve Nash (7)	US Airways Center; 17,744	6–4
11	November 17	@ Miami	L 96–123	Steve Nash (17)	Channing Frye, Hedo Türkoğlu (6)	Hedo Türkoğlu (4)	American Airlines Arena; 19,600	6–5
12	November 18	@ Orlando	L 89–105	Grant Hill (21)	Channing Frye (6)	Goran Dragić (4)	Amway Center; 18,846	6–6
13	November 20	@ Charlotte	L 105–123	Grant Hill (23)	Channing Frye (6)	Goran Dragić (10)	Time Warner Cable Arena; 16,428	6–7
14	November 22	@ Houston	W 123–116	Jason Richardson (26)	Hedo Türkoğlu (9)	Steve Nash (8)	Toyota Center; 15,080	7–7
15	November 24	Chicago	L 115–123 (2OT)	Grant Hill (27)	Hedo Türkoğlu (10)	Steve Nash (16)	US Airways Center; 18,422	7–8
16	November 26	L.A. Clippers	W 116–108	Jason Richardson (29)	Jason Richardson, Hakim Warrick (6)	Steve Nash (10)	US Airways Center; 17,486	8–8
17	November 28	@ Denver	L 133–138	Jason Richardson (39)	Jason Richardson (10)	Steve Nash (11)	Pepsi Center; 15,482	8–9

December: 6–8 (home: 4–4; road: 2–4)

Game	Date	Team	Score	High points	High rebounds	High assists	Location Attendance	Record
18	December 2	@ Golden State	W 107–101	Jason Richardson (25)	Channing Frye (10)	Steve Nash (16)	Oracle Arena; 18,328	9–9
19	December 3	Indiana	W 105–97	Channing Frye (29)	Goran Dragić (6)	Steve Nash (11)	US Airways Center; 18,422	10–9
20	December 5	Washington	W 125–108	Hakim Warrick (26)	Earl Barron (8)	Steve Nash (17)	US Airways Center; 17,430	11–9
21	December 7	@ Portland	L 99–106	Steve Nash (24)	Grant Hill (8)	Steve Nash (14)	Rose Garden; 20,151	11–10
22	December 8	Memphis	L 98–104 (OT)	Goran Dragić (17)	Josh Childress, Channing Frye, Hedo Türkoğlu (7)	Steve Nash (7)	US Airways Center; 16,288	11–11
23	December 10	Portland	L 94–101	Steve Nash (24)	Channing Frye, Steve Nash (7)	Steve Nash (5)	US Airways Center; 17,284	11–12
24	December 15	Minnesota	W 128–122	Jason Richardson (29)	Channing Frye (9)	Steve Nash (19)	US Airways Center; 16,997	12–12
25	December 17	@ Dallas	L 91–106	Hakim Warrick (15)	Channing Frye, Hakim Warrick (14)	Goran Dragić (10)	American Airlines Center; 20,406	12–13
26	December 19	@ Oklahoma City	W 113–110	Grant Hill (30)	Grant Hill (11)	Steve Nash (10)	Oklahoma City Arena; 18,203	13–13
27	December 20	@ San Antonio	L 110–118	Jared Dudley (27)	Robin Lopez (7)	Steve Nash (10)	AT&T Center; 18,581	13–14
28	December 23	Miami	L 83–95	Jared Dudley (33)	Jared Dudley (12)	Steve Nash (18)	US Airways Center; 18,422	13–15
29	December 26	@ L.A. Clippers	L 103–108	Mickaël Piétrus (25)	Grant Hill (7)	Steve Nash (15)	Staples Center; 19,060	13–16
30	December 29	Philadelphia	L 110–123	Steve Nash (23)	Marcin Gortat (6)	Steve Nash (15)	US Airways Center; 18,422	13–17
31	December 31	Detroit	W 92–75	Vince Carter, Jared Dudley (19)	Vince Carter, Marcin Gortat (8)	Marcin Gortat, Goran Dragić (5)	US Airways Center; 17,637	14–17

January: 8–7 (home: 5–3; road: 3–4)

Game	Date	Team	Score	High points	High rebounds	High assists	Location Attendance	Record
32	January 2	@ Sacramento	L 89–94	Steve Nash (20)	Marcin Gortat, Grant Hill (6)	Steve Nash (12)	ARCO Arena; 12,500	14–18
33	January 5	L.A. Lakers	L 95–99	Jared Dudley (21)	Marcin Gortat (9)	Steve Nash (10)	US Airways Center; 18,105	14–19
34	January 7	New York	L 96–121	Vince Carter (19)	Jared Dudley, Channing Frye (6)	Steve Nash (9)	US Airways Center; 17,621	14–20
35	January 9	Cleveland	W 108–100	Jared Dudley (21)	Channing Frye (12)	Steve Nash (17)	US Airways Center; 17,031	15–20
36	January 11	@ Denver	L 98–132	Vince Carter, Steve Nash (15)	Channing Frye (8)	Steve Nash (7)	Pepsi Center; 14,874	15–21
37	January 12	New Jersey	W 118–109 (OT)	Vince Carter, Steve Nash (23)	Channing Frye, Steve Nash (7)	Steve Nash (16)	US Airways Center; 16,334	16–21
38	January 14	Portland	W 115–111	Steve Nash (23)	Channing Frye (8)	Steve Nash (13)	US Airways Center; 17,412	17–21
39	January 17	@ New York	W 129–121	Vince Carter (29)	Vince Carter (12)	Steve Nash (11)	Madison Square Garden; 19,763	18–21
40	January 19	@ Cleveland	W 106–98	Grant Hill (27)	Marcin Gortat, Grant Hill (12)	Steve Nash (15)	Quicken Loans Arena; 20,562	19–21
41	January 21	@ Washington	W 109–91	Channing Frye (25)	Marcin Gortat (14)	Steve Nash (14)	Verizon Center; 15,716	20–21
42	January 22	@ Detroit	L 74–75	Steve Nash (14)	Marcin Gortat (13)	Steve Nash (8)	The Palace of Auburn Hills; 21,326	20–22
43	January 24	@ Philadelphia	L 95–105	Jared Dudley (23)	Jared Dudley (7)	Steve Nash (9)	Wells Fargo Center; 14,881	20–23
44	January 26	Charlotte	L 107–114	Steve Nash (27)	Marcin Gortat (7)	Steve Nash (15)	US Airways Center; 16,986	20–24
45	January 28	Boston	W 88–71	Marcin Gortat (19)	Marcin Gortat (17)	Steve Nash (10)	US Airways Center; 18,422	21–24
46	January 30	New Orleans	W 104–102	Marcin Gortat (25)	Marcin Gortat (11)	Steve Nash (15)	US Airways Center; 17,921	22–24

February: 9–3 (home: 4–3; road: 5–0)

Game	Date	Team	Score	High points	High rebounds	High assists	Location Attendance	Record
47	February 2	Milwaukee	W 92–77	Marcin Gortat (19)	Channing Frye (13)	Steve Nash (13)	US Airways Center; 16,422	23–24
48	February 4	Oklahoma City	L 107–111	Vince Carter (33)	Channing Frye (9)	Steve Nash (8)	US Airways Center; 16,274	23–25
49	February 7	@ Golden State	W 104–92	Channing Frye (19)	Channing Frye (11)	Steve Nash (15)	Oracle Arena; 18,002	24–25
50	February 10	Golden State	W 112–88	Steve Nash (18)	Channing Frye, Marcin Gortat (9)	Steve Nash (11)	US Airways Center; 16,731	25–25
51	February 11	@ Utah	W 95–83	Steve Nash (18)	Marcin Gortat (10)	Steve Nash (10)	EnergySolutions Arena; 19,911	26–25
52	February 13	Sacramento	L 108–113	Steve Nash (22)	Marcin Gortat (12)	Steve Nash (18)	US Airways Center; 17,798	26–26
53	February 15	Utah	W 102–101	Channing Frye (31)	Channing Frye (11)	Steve Nash (14)	US Airways Center; 16,874	27–26
54	February 17	Dallas	L 106–112	Channing Frye (24)	Robin Lopez (13)	Steve Nash (14)	US Airways Center; 17,903	27–27
All-Star Break
55	February 23	Atlanta	W 105–97	Channing Frye (20)	Marcin Gortat (12)	Steve Nash (10)	US Airways Center; 18,254	28–27
56	February 25	@ Toronto	W 110–92	Vince Carter, Marcin Gortat (17)	Marcin Gortat (11)	Steve Nash (11)	Air Canada Centre; 19,004	29–27
57	February 27	@ Indiana	W 110–108 (OT)	Grant Hill (34)	Marcin Gortat (11)	Steve Nash (13)	Conseco Fieldhouse; 14,168	30–27
58	February 28	@ New Jersey	W 104–103 (OT)	Marcin Gortat (17)	Channing Frye (8)	Steve Nash (15)	Prudential Center; 15,836	31–27

March: 5–11 (home: 3–5; road: 2–6)

Game	Date	Team	Score	High points	High rebounds	High assists	Location Attendance	Record
59	March 2	@ Boston	L 103–115	Aaron Brooks (17)	Marcin Gortat (13)	Aaron Brooks, Steve Nash (7)	TD Garden; 18,624	31–28
60	March 4	@ Milwaukee	W 102–88	Channing Frye, Mickaël Piétrus (20)	Channing Frye (9)	Steve Nash (13)	Bradley Center; 15,011	32–28
61	March 6	@ Oklahoma City	L 118–122 (OT)	Vince Carter (29)	Channing Frye (15)	Steve Nash (14)	Oklahoma City Arena; 18,203	32–29
62	March 8	Houston	W 113–110	Vince Carter, Hakim Warrick (32)	Marcin Gortat (16)	Steve Nash (14)	US Airways Center; 17,363	33–29
63	March 10	Denver	L 97–116	Marcin Gortat (14)	Marcin Gortat (18)	Aaron Brooks, Steve Nash (7)	US Airways Center; 17,465	33–30
64	March 13	Orlando	L 88–111	Aaron Brooks (19)	Hakim Warrick (8)	Aaron Brooks (10)	US Airways Center; 18,091	33–31
65	March 14	@ Houston	L 93–95	Vince Carter (21)	Marcin Gortat, Hakim Warrick (8)	Zabian Dowdell (5)	Toyota Center; 16,262	33–32
66	March 16	@ New Orleans	L 95–100	Jared Dudley (25)	Jared Dudley, Marcin Gortat (8)	Steve Nash (10)	New Orleans Arena; 13,758	33–33
67	March 18	Golden State	W 108–97	Marcin Gortat (18)	Channing Frye, Marcin Gortat (9)	Steve Nash (10)	US Airways Center; 18,422	34–33
68	March 20	@ L.A. Clippers	W 108–99	Steve Nash (23)	Marcin Gortat (13)	Steve Nash (13)	Staples Center; 19,060	35–33
69	March 22	@ L.A. Lakers	L 137–139 (3OT)	Channing Frye (32)	Marcin Gortat (16)	Steve Nash (20)	Staples Center; 18,997	35–34
70	March 23	Toronto	W 114–106	Aaron Brooks (25)	Marcin Gortat (8)	Aaron Brooks, Steve Nash (8)	US Airways Center; 17,865	36–34
71	March 25	New Orleans	L 100–106	Marcin Gortat, Grant Hill (18)	Marcin Gortat (10)	Steve Nash (8)	US Airways Center; 18,422	36–35
72	March 27	Dallas	L 83–91	Jared Dudley, Marcin Gortat (20)	Marcin Gortat (15)	Steve Nash (10)	US Airways Center; 17,314	36–36
73	March 29	@ Sacramento	L 113–116	Jared Dudley, Channing Frye (21)	Marcin Gortat (11)	Steve Nash (14)	Power Balance Pavilion; 13,774	36–37
74	March 30	Oklahoma City	L 98–116	Vince Carter (28)	Marcin Gortat (10)	Steve Nash (9)	US Airways Center; 18,033	36–38

April: 4–4 (home: 3–0; road: 1–4)

Game	Date	Team	Score	High points	High rebounds	High assists	Location Attendance	Record
75	April 1	L.A. Clippers	W 111–98	Grant Hill (19)	Marcin Gortat (11)	Aaron Brooks (6)	US Airways Center; 18,422	37–38
76	April 3	@ San Antonio	L 97–114	Aaron Brooks, Channing Frye (14)	Jared Dudley (10)	Aaron Brooks (6)	AT&T Center; 18,581	37–39
77	April 5	@ Chicago	L 94–97	Vince Carter (23)	Marcin Gortat (13)	Steve Nash (16)	United Center; 21,873	37–40
78	April 6	@ Minnesota	W 108–98	Marcin Gortat (20)	Marcin Gortat (16)	Steve Nash (9)	Target Center; 16,113	38–40
79	April 8	@ New Orleans	L 97–109	Jared Dudley (18)	Jared Dudley, Channing Frye (7)	Aaron Brooks (9)	New Orleans Arena; 14,950	38–41
80	April 10	@ Dallas	L 90–115	Marcin Gortat (15)	Marcin Gortat (9)	Steve Nash (9)	American Airlines Center; 20,355	38–42
81	April 11	Minnesota	W 135–127 (OT)	Channing Frye (33)	Jared Dudley, Marcin Gortat (8)	Steve Nash (16)	US Airways Center; 17,485	39–42
82	April 13	San Antonio	W 106–103	Marcin Gortat (21)	Marcin Gortat (13)	Steve Nash (10)	US Airways Center; 18,195	40–42

2010–11 season schedule

== Player statistics ==
Legend
GP	Games played	GS	Games started	MPG	Minutes per game
FG%	Field-goal percentage	3P%	3-point field-goal percentage	FT%	Free-throw percentage
RPG	Rebounds per game	APG	Assists per game	SPG	Steals per game
BPG	Blocks per game	PPG	Points per game

=== Season ===
Player	GP	GS	MPG	FG%	3P%	FT%	RPG	APG	SPG	BPG	PPG
Earl Barron*	12	6	15.3	.235	.000	.600	3.3	0.3	.5	.3	3.0
Aaron Brooks*	25	5	18.9	.430	.328	.807	1.1	4.2	.5	.0	9.6
Vince Carter*	51	41	27.2	.422	.366	.735	3.6	1.6	.9	.3	13.5
Josh Childress	54	3	16.6	.565†	.063	.492	2.9	0.8	.6	.4	5.0
Earl Clark*	9	0	8.0	.387	.000	.500	1.9	0.4	.1	.3	3.2
Zabian Dowdell	24	0	12.2	.408	.300	.941#	0.8	2.1	.8	.1	5.0
Goran Dragić*	48	2	17.8	.421	.277	.608	1.8	3.1	.8	.1	7.4
Jared Dudley	82	15	26.1	.477	.415	.743	3.9	1.3	1.1+	.2	10.6
Channing Frye	77	64	33.0	.432	.390	.832	6.7+	1.2	.6	1.0+	12.7
Marcin Gortat*	55	12	29.7	.563†	.250	.731	9.3+	1.0	.5	1.3+	13.0
Grant Hill	80	80	30.1	.484	.395	.829	4.2	2.5	.8	.4	13.2
Gani Lawal	1	0	2.0	.000	.000	.000	0.0	0.0	.0	.0	0.0
Robin Lopez	67	56	14.8	.501†	.000	.740	3.2	0.1	.3	.7	6.4
Steve Nash	75	75	33.3	.492†	.395	.912#	3.5	11.4	.6	.1	14.7+
Mickaël Piétrus*	38	4	18.1	.392	.342	.706	2.0	0.6	.5	.5	7.4
Jason Richardson*	25	25	31.8	.470	.419^	.764	4.4	1.4	1.1+	.1	19.3+
Garret Siler	21	0	4.8	.548†	.000	.500	1.3	0.1	.1	.2	2.1
Hedo Türkoğlu*	25	16	25.2	.440	.423^	.722	4.0	2.3	.7	.6	9.5
Hakim Warrick	80	6	17.7	.511†	.091	.721	3.7	0.9	.4	.1	8.4

* – Stats with the Suns.
† – Minimum 300 field goals made.
^ – Minimum 55 three-pointers made.
# – Minimum 125 free throws made.
+ – Minimum 70 games played or 800 rebounds, 125 steals, 100 blocks, 1400 points.

== Awards, records and milestones ==
=== Awards ===
==== Season ====
- Steve Nash led the league in assists with 11.4 assists per game.

=== Records ===
- On November 14, 2010, the Suns scored a franchise record 22 three-pointers in a victory over the Los Angeles Lakers.

=== Milestones ===
- On January 16, 2011, Vince Carter scored his 20,000th point in a victory over the New York Knicks.

== Injuries and surgeries ==
- During the Los Angeles Lakers game on November 14, Jared Dudley accidentally landed on Robin Lopez's right leg. Robin was slated to be out for 1–2 weeks. This caused the Suns to replace Matt Janning with Earl Barron.

== Transactions ==
=== Trades ===
July 9, 2010	To Chicago Bulls 2011 second-round pick	To Phoenix Suns (United States) Hakim Warrick (sign and trade)
July 9, 2010	To New York Knicks (United States) Amar'e Stoudemire (sign and trade)	To Phoenix Suns Protected future second-round pick Cash considerations
July 13, 2010	To Atlanta Hawks 2012 second-round pick	To Phoenix Suns (United States) Josh Childress (sign and trade)
July 14, 2010	To Toronto Raptors (Brazil) Leandro Barbosa (United States) Dwayne Jones	To Phoenix Suns (Turkey) Hedo Türkoğlu
December 18, 2010	To Orlando Magic (United States) Jason Richardson (Turkey) Hedo Türkoğlu (United States) Earl Clark	To Phoenix Suns (United States) Vince Carter (Poland) Marcin Gortat (France) Mickaël Piétrus 2011 first-round draft pick Cash considerations
February 24, 2011	To Houston Rockets (Slovenia) Goran Dragić 2011 lottery protected first-round draft pick	To Phoenix Suns (United States) Aaron Brooks

=== Free agents ===
==== Additions ====
Player	Signed	Former Team
Grant Hill	Signed 1-year extended contract for $3.3 million	Phoenix Suns
Channing Frye	Signed 5-year contract for $30 million	Phoenix Suns
Hakim Warrick	Signed 4-year contract for $18 million	Chicago Bulls
Josh Childress	Signed 5-year contract for $33 million	(Greece) Olympiacos Piraeus B.C. / Atlanta Hawks
Matt Janning	Signed 2-year contract for $3 million	Northeastern University Huskies
Garret Siler	Signed 2-year contract for $3 million	(China) Shanghai Xiyang Sharks
Earl Barron	Signed 1-year contract totaling out to $188,558	New York Knicks
Zabian Dowdell	Signed two 10-day contracts / 1-year contract for $242,374	Tulsa 66ers / Phoenix Suns

a: Josh Childress still had his original NBA rights to the Atlanta Hawks.
b: Matt Janning was originally undrafted on the 2010 NBA draft.
c: Zabian Dowdell signed two 10-day contracts before officially signing up with the Suns.

==== Subtractions ====
Player	Reason left	New team
Amar'e Stoudemire	Free agent	New York Knicks
Leandro Barbosa	Traded	(Canada) Toronto Raptors
Dwayne Jones	Traded / Waived	(Canada) Toronto Raptors / (China) Fujian SBS Xunxing
Taylor Griffin	Waived	(Belgium) Belgacom Liège
Dwayne Collins	Signed a new contract	(Italy) Pallacanestro Varese
Louis Amundson	Free agent	Golden State Warriors
Jarron Collins	Free agent	Los Angeles Clippers / Portland Trail Blazers
Matt Janning	Waived	Maine Red Claws / Rio Grande Valley Vipers
Earl Barron	Waived	Milwaukee Bucks / Portland Trail Blazers
Jason Richardson; Hedo Türkoğlu; Earl Clark	Traded	Orlando Magic
Zabian Dowdell	First two 10-day contracts expired	Phoenix Suns
Goran Dragić	Traded	Houston Rockets

d: Dwayne Jones did originally leave by the trade for Hedo Türkoğlu. However, the Toronto Raptors waived him later on in the year and was allowed back in the Suns' training camp roster. When he was outperformed by Garret Siler in the preseason, he was officially waived and decided to play overseas in China with the Fujian SBS Xunxing.
e: Although Dwayne Collins played for Pallacanestro Varese this season, he still retained his international rights to the Phoenix Suns until 2014.
f: Jarron Collins originally signed two 10–day contracts with the Los Angeles Clippers in January 2011 before being waived on his second contract with them. He later got two more 10–day contracts with the Portland Trail Blazers in March 2011 before officially retiring from playing basketball after this season was over with.
g: Unlike most other players that signed on with the team, Matt Janning never played a single game for the Suns during his time with the team.
h: Matt Janning originally played for the Maine Red Claws on December 1, 2010 in the D-League after being waived by the Suns until his rights were traded to the Rio Grande Valley Vipers on January 20, 2011.
i: After Earl Barron was waived by the Suns, he played for the Milwaukee Bucks throughout March 2011 due to two 10–day contracts with the team before he would eventually sign a contract to play with the Portland Trail Blazers for the rest of the season on April 12, 2011.
j: Zabian Dowdell eventually signed on to the Suns for a full year contract.
