= Hakim Warrick =

American basketball player (born 1982)

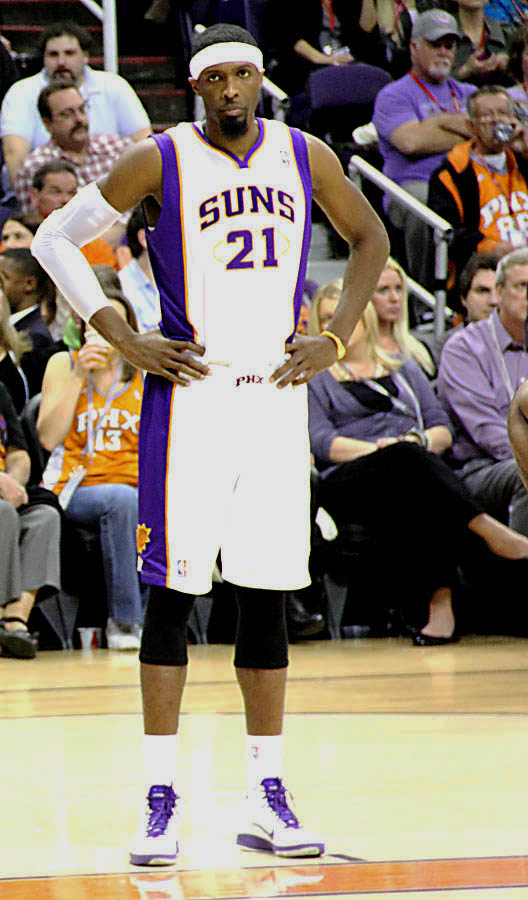
- Warrick with the Phoenix Suns in 2011

Personal information
- Born: July 8, 1982 (age 44) Philadelphia, Pennsylvania, U.S.
- Listed height: 6 ft 9 in (2.06 m)
- Listed weight: 219 lb (99 kg)

Career information
- High school: Friends' Central School (Wynnewood, Pennsylvania)
- College: Syracuse (2001–2005)
- NBA draft: 2005: 1st round, 19th overall pick
- Drafted by: Memphis Grizzlies
- Playing career: 2005–2019
- Position: Power forward
- Number: 21, 1

Career history
- 2005–2009: Memphis Grizzlies
- 2009–2010: Milwaukee Bucks
- 2010: Chicago Bulls
- 2010–2012: Phoenix Suns
- 2012: New Orleans Hornets
- 2012–2013: Charlotte Bobcats
- 2013–2014: Liaoning Flying Leopards
- 2015: Torku Konyaspor
- 2015–2016: Melbourne United
- 2016: Olympiacos
- 2017: Leones de Ponce
- 2018: Al Mouttahed Tripoli
- 2018: Ironi Nahariya
- 2018–2019: Iowa Wolves

Career highlights
- NBL Best Sixth Man (2016); NCAA champion (2003); Consensus first-team All-American (2005); Second-team All-American – SN (2004); Third-team All-American – AP, NABC (2004); Big East Player of the Year (2005); 2× First-team All-Big East (2004, 2005); Big East tournament MVP (2005); No. 1 retired by Syracuse Orange

Career NBA statistics
- Points: 4,947 (9.4 ppg)
- Rebounds: 2,117 (4.0 rpg)
- Assists: 400 (0.8 apg)
- Stats at NBA.com
- Stats at Basketball Reference

Hakim Hanif Warrick (born July 8, 1982) is an American former professional basketball player. A power forward, he played college basketball for the Syracuse Orange from 2001 to 2005. He won an NCAA championship in 2003 and blocked a potential game-tying three-pointer in the title game.

Warrick was selected in the 2005 NBA draft by the Memphis Grizzlies. He played for eight seasons in the National Basketball Association (NBA) with the Grizzlies, Milwaukee Bucks, Chicago Bulls, Phoenix Suns, New Orleans Hornets and Charlotte Bobcats. Warrick then embarked on an international career and played in China, Turkey, Australia, Greece, Puerto Rico, Lebanon and Israel. He played his final season in the NBA G League during the 2018–19 season.

== High school career ==
Warrick played for Friends' Central School in Wynnewood, Pennsylvania. In his senior season (2000–2001), he helped Friends' Central to a 23–2 record and the Friends Schools League title with averages of 15.6 points, 13.0 rebounds and 4.8 blocks. It was Friends' Central's first title since 1974. For his efforts, Warrick earned All-Friends League, All-Mainline and all-state honors.

== College career ==
Even with his high school's proximity to the City 6, comprising Division I programs Penn, St. Joseph's, Temple, LaSalle, Drexel, and Villanova, none of those schools heavily recruited Warrick. Syracuse was not initially high on Warrick, either, as Warrick was considered a last resort by the Syracuse coaching staff and was only offered a scholarship when All-American recruit Julius Hodge selected North Carolina State over Syracuse.

=== Freshman ===
Warrick appeared in all 35 games his freshman year, starting 19-straight games starting with a game against Binghamton, and remained there until Jan. 28, 2002 against Georgetown. Warrick averaged 6.0 points and 4.3 rebounds and the Orangemen were 15–4 during that stretch. However, Syracuse coach Jim Boeheim had to promote James Thues to the starting lineup after DeShaun Williams struggled as the team's starting point guard.

Although the Orange missed the NCAA Tournament, Warrick played a key role in Syracuse's run to the NIT Final Four. Warrick had 14 points, 10 rebounds and a career-high six blocks in the first-round victory against St. Bonaventure and against Richmond, Warrick had 15 points and 14 rebounds. The Orange lost to Temple in the semifinal round 65–54. Warrick finished with 12 points, going 2-of-12 from the free-throw line, including four key misses in the final minutes of the game.

=== Sophomore ===
Warrick started all 35 games in his sophomore year and was named the Big East Most Improved Player after more than doubling his scoring average from the previous year (6.1 to 14.8 ppg) and improving his rebound average by 3.7 boards per game (4.8 to 8.5 rpg). He was also named to the USBWA All-District II Team and the All-Big East Third Team.

Warrick also played a large role in Syracuse's first National Championship. In the Sweet 16 against Auburn and the Elite 8 against Oklahoma, Warrick averaged 14.0 points and 6.5 rebounds, and was named to the All-East Regional team. In the semifinal against Texas, he scored 18 points.

However, Warrick is best known for his blocked shot in the National Championship game against Kansas. Leading by three with under 15 seconds left, Warrick missed two free throws that would've sealed the game with Syracuse hanging on to a three-point lead, 81–78. With 1.5 seconds left and the score still the same, Kansas' Michael Lee was wide-open from the baseline for a potential game-tying 3-pointer. But Warrick used his long arms to block Lee's attempt and Syracuse captured its first ever national championship.

==== Team USA ====
Warrick was one of 16 finalists for the 2003 USA Basketball Men's Pan American Games Team. However, he did not make the cut.

=== Junior ===
After Carmelo Anthony declared early for the NBA draft, Warrick became the team's top scoring option. He led the team in scoring (19.8) and rebounds (8.6), and was named to the second-team All-America teams by ESPN.com and The Sporting News. He was also a finalist for three national player of the year awards – the Naismith, Rupp and Wooden awards and was a first-team All-Big East selection.

Syracuse advanced to the Sweet 16 and in the second-round game against Maryland, Warrick scored 26 points and added nine rebounds. Over the three NCAA Tournament games, Warrick averaged 22.3 points and 6.3 rebounds an outing.

=== Senior ===
Warrick continued his improvement in his final year, averaging 21.4 points and 8.6 rebounds per game. He was named the Big East Conference Player of the Year and was a consensus All-American from the Associated Press, CollegeInsider.com, NABC, Rivals.com, Rupp Team and Wooden Team.

Syracuse captured the 2005 Big East Championship. During those three games, and one game in the NCAA Tournament, Warrick led Syracuse with averages of 22.5 points and 12.0 rebounds. However, Warrick's last game at Syracuse was a disappointment, as fourth-seeded Syracuse was handed a 60–57 overtime upset in the first round of the NCAA tournament by 13th seeded Vermont. Warrick had 21 points in the defeat.

=== College legacy ===
Warrick finished his career with averages of 15.4 points on 53.6% shooting, 7.6 rebounds and 1.5 assists per game. He finished second all-time at Syracuse in free throws made (529) and free throws attempted (803), third for consecutive double-figure scoring games (61) and fourth in points (2,073) and rebounds (1,025).

Warrick also left Syracuse as one of the most prolific dunkers in the school's history, aided by his 7-foot-1 wingspan. Specifically, Warrick is known for two dunks. The first came against the Texas Longhorns in the National Semifinal of the 2003 NCAA tournament. In the second half, Warrick collected a rebound, dribbled once, and leaped over 6-foot-3 Royal Ivey. The dunk, which came with Ivey's face buried in Warrick's midsection, was actually scored as an offensive foul. Warrick was impressed at his own feat the following day: "It's one of those things you amaze yourself, you just can't believe you did it."

The second came against Notre Dame on January 10, 2005, in Warrick's senior year. With 17:15 left in the first half, Warrick took an entry pass from Gerry McNamara in the left block, about six feet from the hoop. Warrick was met in the lane by Notre Dame's 6-foot-9, 238-pound power forward, Dennis Latimore. Warrick pumped-faked in the lane, and, while flat-footed, leapt over the outstretched arms of Latimore and emphatically slammed the ball with one hand.

In March 2023, Syracuse University officially retired his #1 jersey alongside his teammate Gerry McNamara.

== Professional career ==
=== NBA ===
==== Memphis Grizzlies ====
Warrick was projected as high as a lottery pick in the 2005 NBA draft or as low as a mid-first-round pick. Although Warrick's 38-inch vertical jump and a 7–2 wingspan impressed NBA scouts, they often worried that he was not heavy enough to guard the stronger power forwards in the NBA and did not possess the ballhandling ability associated with small forward. Warrick ended up slipping to the 19th pick, where he was selected by the Memphis Grizzlies.

Warrick appeared in 68 games as a rookie, including two starts, and averaged 4.1 points and 2.1 assists in 10.6 minutes per game playing behind Pau Gasol. On January 31, 2006, Warrick was named to be one of the contestants in the NBA All-Star Slam Dunk Contest during the All-Star Weekend. He came in third place, behind New York Knicks guard Nate Robinson and Philadelphia 76ers forward Andre Iguodala. Warrick also played in three playoff games in his rookie season, as the Grizzlies were swept in four games by the Dallas Mavericks. On April 29, 2006, Warrick scored 11 points, including 7-of-8 free throws in a 94–89 overtime loss. Warrick started Game Four in place of Jake Tsakalidis. Warrick finished the playoff series with averages of 6.7 points and 2.3 rebounds per game.

Over the summer of 2006, Memphis lost their star forward Gasol to a broken foot, leaving Warrick as one of the team's top options as starting power forward. Warrick played in all 82 games in 2006–07, including 43 starts. On December 9, 2006, against the Milwaukee Bucks, Warrick recorded career highs in points (31) and rebounds (13) and made all nine of his free throw attempts in a 100–94 loss. He later set a new career high of 16 rebounds in the Grizzlies 116–111 loss to the Phoenix Suns. Warrick finished the season with averages of 12.7 points per game and 5.1 rebounds per game.

==== Later years ====
On July 31, 2009, Warrick signed a one-year deal with the Milwaukee Bucks.

On February 18, 2010, Warrick was traded to the Chicago Bulls along with Joe Alexander for John Salmons.

On July 8, 2010, Warrick agreed to a 4-year, $18 million contract with the Phoenix Suns. The deal was completed as a sign-and-trade, which resulted in Phoenix giving up their 2011 second round pick to Chicago. The pick was later acquired by the Golden State Warriors, who used it to draft Charles Jenkins. Warrick started only 6 total games with the Suns.

On July 27, 2012, Warrick was traded along with Robin Lopez to the New Orleans Hornets in a three-way trade that included the Minnesota Timberwolves. Warrick only played a grand total of 7 minutes with the Hornets.

On November 13, 2012, Warrick was traded to the Charlotte Bobcats for Matt Carroll.

At the trade deadline on February 21, 2013, Warrick was traded to the Orlando Magic in exchange for Josh McRoberts. He never played for the Magic as he was waived by them two days later.

=== Overseas ===
==== China and Turkey ====
In November 2013, Warrick worked out for the Sichuan Blue Whales of the Chinese Basketball Association (CBA) but was subsequently not signed. In December 2013, he signed with the Liaoning Flying Leopards, also of the CBA.

On January 5, 2015, Warrick signed with Torku Konyaspor of the Turkish Basketball League.

==== Australia ====
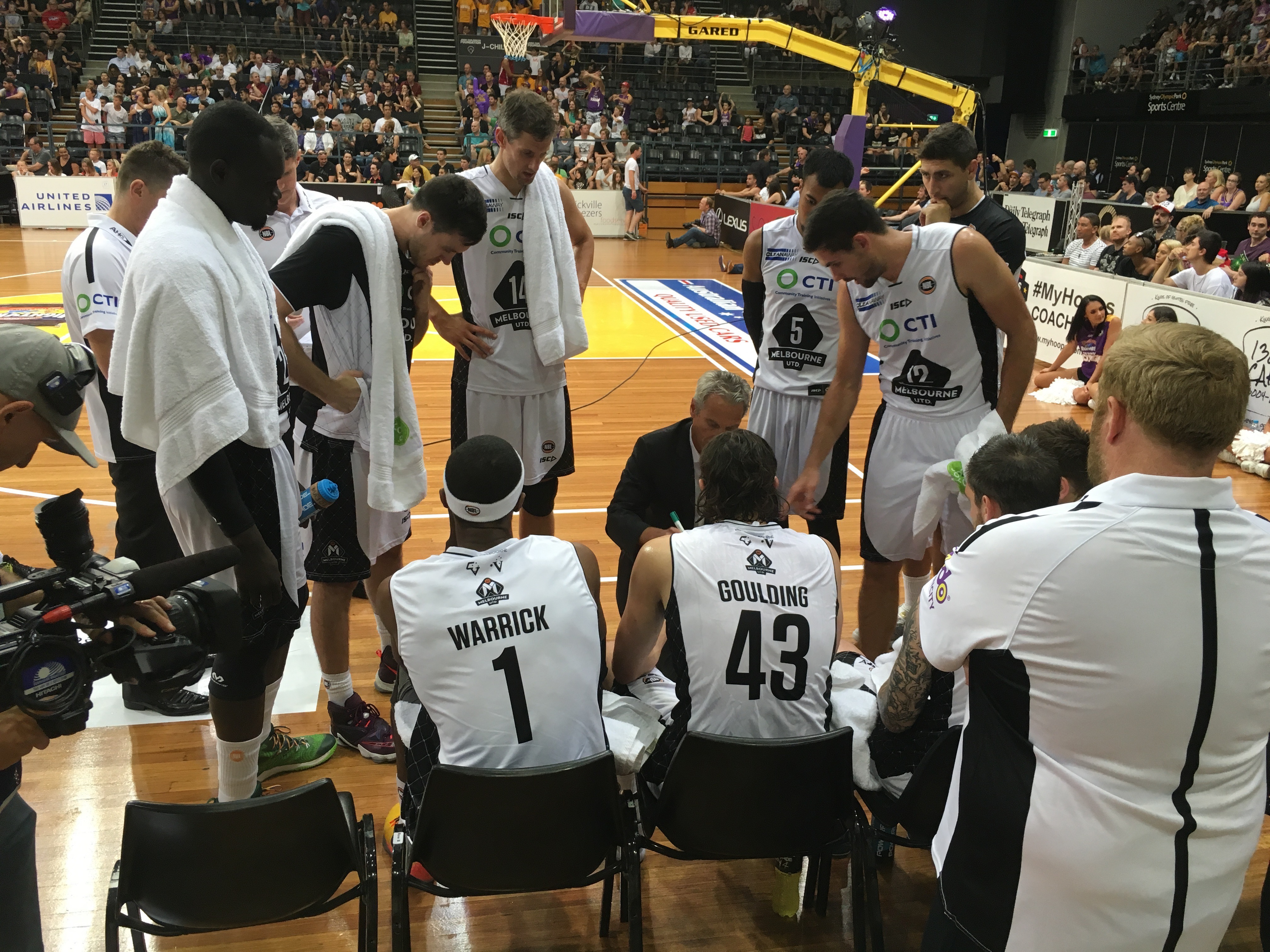
Warrick with Melbourne United in 2015

On September 22, 2015, Warrick signed with Melbourne United for the 2015–16 NBL season. After averaging 12.8 points per game for United off the bench over the first five games, helping the team earn a 5–0 start, Warrick sustained a groin injury and was placed on the short-term injury waiver list. He was temporarily replaced in the line-up by Garrett Jackson on October 29, returning from injury on November 22 to face the New Zealand Breakers. On February 17, 2016, he was named NBL Best Sixth Man for the 2015–16 season. Warrick helped lead United to the minor premiership after finishing the regular season in first place on the ladder with an 18–10 win–loss record. However, in their semi-final series against the fourth-seeded New Zealand Breakers, United were swept 2–0 to bow out of the playoffs. In 23 games for United in 2015–16, Warrick averaged 14.2 points and 6.0 rebounds per game.

==== Greece ====
On February 24, 2016, Warrick signed to play in Greece, with Olympiacos of the Greek Basket League and Euroleague, for the rest of the season. Olympiacos won the Greek Basket League championship in 2015–2016.

==== Israel ====
On April 28, 2018, Warrick signed with the Israeli team Ironi Nahariya for the rest of the season.

=== Iowa Wolves (2018–2019) ===
On October 20, 2018, Warrick was selected 9th overall by the Delaware Blue Coats in the 2018 NBA G League draft. Later the right for Warrick was acquired along with returning right of James Webb III by the Iowa Wolves for the returning right of Michael Bryson. On October 22, 2018, Warrick was included in the training camp roster of the Iowa Wolves.

== Career statistics ==
=== NBA ===
Legend
GP	Games played	GS	Games started	MPG	Minutes per game
FG%	Field goal percentage	3P%	3-point field goal percentage	FT%	Free throw percentage
RPG	Rebounds per game	APG	Assists per game	SPG	Steals per game
BPG	Blocks per game	PPG	Points per game	**Bold**	Career high
*	Led the league

==== Regular season ====
Year	Team	GP	GS	MPG	FG%	3P%	FT%	RPG	APG	SPG	BPG	PPG
2005–06	Memphis	68	2	10.6	.443	.000	.661	2.1	.4	.2	.3	4.1
2006–07	Memphis	**82***	**43**	**26.2**	**.524**	.000	.771	**5.1**	**.9**	.5	.4	**12.7**
2007–08	Memphis	75	30	23.4	.502	**.271**	.704	4.7	.7	.5	.4	11.4
2008–09	Memphis	**82***	7	24.7	.491	.217	.711	5.0	.8	.6	**.5**	11.6
2009–10	Milwaukee	48	6	21.3	.481	.167	.727	4.4	.7	.4	.2	10.2
2009–10	Chicago	28	0	19.0	.483	.000	.755	3.6	.6	.3	.3	8.7
2010–11	Phoenix	80	6	17.7	.511	.091	.721	3.7	**.9**	.4	.1	8.4
2011–12	Phoenix	35	0	14.4	.411	.100	.768	2.6	**.9**	.2	.1	6.4
2012–13	New Orleans	1	0	7.0	.500	.000	**1.000**	.0	.0	**1.0**	.0	4.0
2012–13	Charlotte	27	14	17.9	.405	.000	.674	3.3	**.9**	.4	.2	7.0
Career		526	108	20.2	.490	.191	.726	4.0	.8	.4	.3	9.4

==== Playoffs ====
Year	Team	GP	GS	MPG	FG%	3P%	FT%	RPG	APG	SPG	BPG	PPG
2006	Memphis	**3**	**1**	**14.3**	**.250**	.000	**.857**	**2.3**	.0	**.3**	.0	**6.7**
2010	Chicago	**3**	0	10.3	.182	.000	.833	1.7	.0	.0	.0	3.0
Career		6	1	12.2	.222	.000	.850	2.0	.0	.2	.0	4.8

=== College ===
Year	GP	Min	Pts	FG%	FT%	3P%	Rebs	Asts	Stls	Blocks	TOs	PFs
'01–02	35	17.4	6.1	55.2	38.3	50.0	4.8	0.5	0.5	0.6	1.1	2.0
'02–03	35	32.7	14.8	54.1	66.7	0.0	8.5	1.6	1.7	1.5	2.6	2.6
'03–04	31	37.3	19.8	50.9	69.2	0.0	8.5	2.6	0.9	1.1	3.1	2.7
'04–05	34	37.5	21.4	54.8	68.1	29.0	8.6	1.5	1.0	0.8	2.5	2.3
**TOTALS**	**135**	**31.0**	**15.4**	**53.6**	**65.9**	**25.0**	**7.6**	**1.5**	**0.9**	**0.9**	**2.3**	**2.4**

== Personal life ==
Warrick is the son of Kenneth Nichols and Queen Warrick and has two brothers, Bill and Tyrell, and a sister, Ciara. Warrick graduated from Syracuse in 2005 with a degree in retail management and consumer studies. Warrick's earliest basketball memory involves monkey bars. "[T]he older guys wouldn't let us on the court and me and my friends used to go over and play basketball on the monkey bars. So that's when I first started dunking and everything."

== See also ==
- List of NCAA Division I men's basketball players with 2000 points and 1000 rebounds
