= Channing Frye =

American basketball player (born 1983)

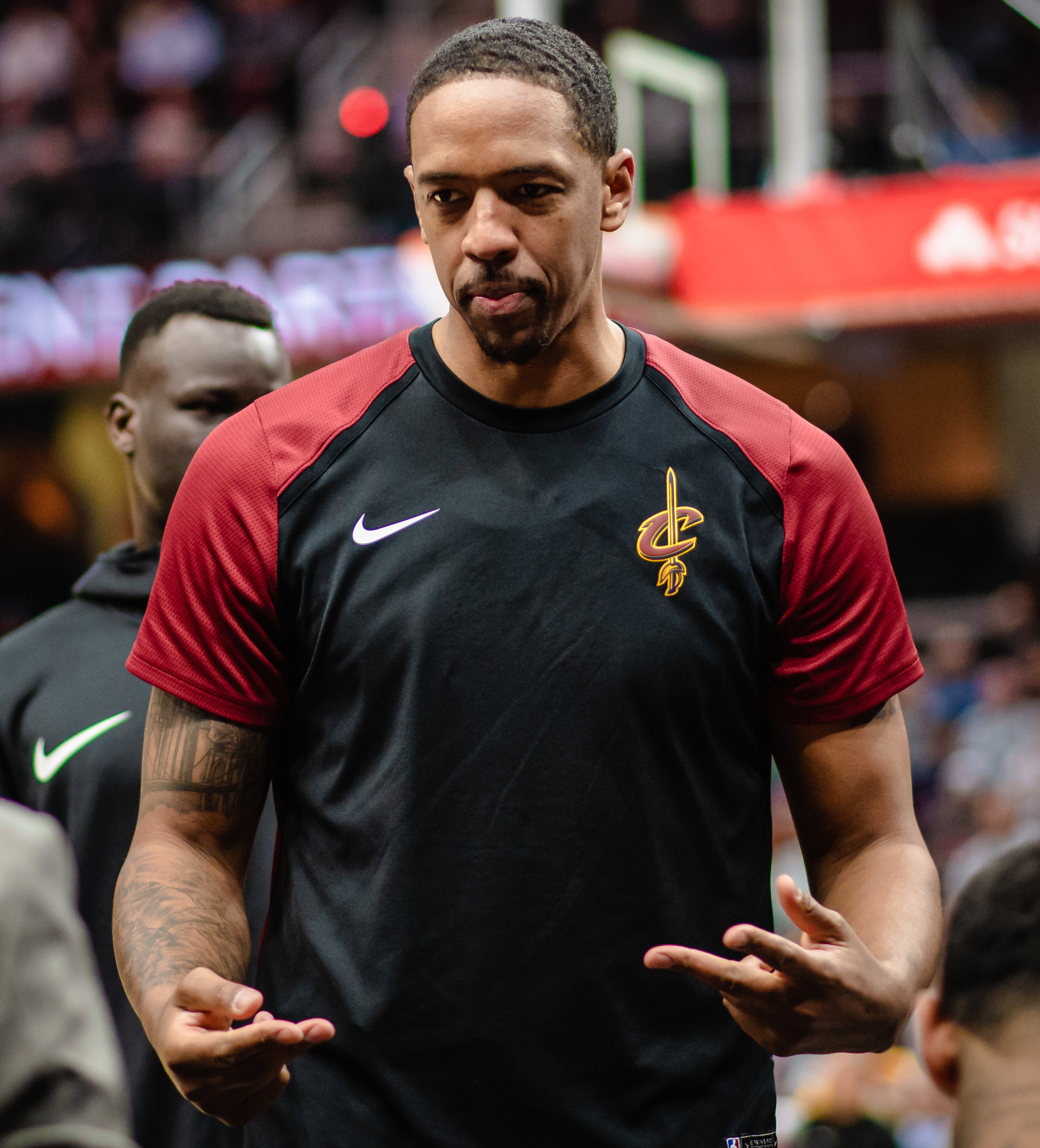
- Frye with the Cleveland Cavaliers in 2019

Personal information
- Born: May 17, 1983 (age 43) White Plains, New York, U.S.
- Listed height: 7 ft 0 in (2.13 m)
- Listed weight: 255 lb (116 kg)

Career information
- High school: St. Mary's (Phoenix, Arizona)
- College: Arizona (2001–2005)
- NBA draft: 2005: 1st round, 8th overall pick
- Drafted by: New York Knicks
- Playing career: 2005–2019
- Position: Power forward / center
- Number: 45, 7, 44, 8, 9, 12

Career history
- 2005–2007: New York Knicks
- 2007–2009: Portland Trail Blazers
- 2009–2014: Phoenix Suns
- 2014–2016: Orlando Magic
- 2016–2018: Cleveland Cavaliers
- 2018: Los Angeles Lakers
- 2018–2019: Cleveland Cavaliers

Career highlights
- NBA champion (2016); NBA All-Rookie First Team (2006); 2× First-team All-Pac-10 (2004, 2005); Pac-10 All-Freshman Team (2002); McDonald's All-American (2001); Fourth-team Parade All-American (2001)

Career NBA statistics
- Points: 7,786 (8.7 ppg)
- Rebounds: 4,002 (4.5 rpg)
- Assists: 864 (1.0 apg)
- Stats at NBA.com
- Stats at Basketball Reference

Channing Thomas Frye (born May 17, 1983) is an American former professional basketball player. A power forward-center, he played college basketball for the Arizona Wildcats. He was selected eighth overall by the New York Knicks in the 2005 NBA draft, and was the first college senior to be selected in that draft. He also played for the Portland Trail Blazers, Phoenix Suns, Orlando Magic, Cleveland Cavaliers and Los Angeles Lakers, winning an NBA Championship with the Cavaliers in the 2016 NBA Finals.

== High school career ==
Raised Catholic, Frye attended St. Mary's High School in Phoenix, Arizona, where he was rated the No. 98 recruit in the nation by Hoop Scoop and the No. 13 center in the country by Fast Break Recruiting Service. As a junior in 1999–2000, he averaged 15 points, 12 rebounds, nine blocks and six assists per game for coach David Lopez as he led the team to a 26–7 record, a berth in the Class 5A state tournament semi-finals and a No. 19 national ranking by USA Today.

As a senior in 2000–01, Frye averaged 22 points, 15 rebounds, six blocks and three assists per game and he led St. Mary's to the 2001 Class 5A state championship with a 30–3 record. He was subsequently named Player of the Year by the Arizona Republic and the Arizona Gatorade Player of the Year while earning fourth-team Parade All-America and McDonald's All-America honors.

== College career ==
As a freshman at Arizona in 2001–02, Frye was a key contributor for the Wildcats as he started 25 of 34 games after working his way into the starting lineup by late December and stayed there for the rest of the season. He earned Pac-10 All-Freshman team honors after averaging 9.5 points, 6.3 rebounds and 1.5 blocks in 23.9 minutes per game.

As a sophomore in 2002–03, Frye was an honorable mention All-Pac-10 selection and earned Pac-10 Player of the Week honors on February 27, 2003, following a win over Arizona State. In 32 games (27 starts), he averaged 12.6 points, 8.0 rebounds and 1.9 blocks in 25.4 minutes per game.

As a junior in 2003–04, Frye earned first-team All-Pac-10 and USBWA All-District 9 team honors. In 30 games (all starts), he averaged 15.9 points, 7.4 rebounds, 1.9 assists and 2.1 blocks in 30.3 minutes per game.

As a senior in 2004–05, Frye received the University of Arizona's Sapphire Award, which is given to the outstanding senior male student-athlete. He also earned the 2004–05 Pacific-10 Conference Sportsmanship Award. For a second consecutive year, he earned first-team All-Pac-10 and USBWA All-District 9 team honors, as well as first-team NABC All-NCAA District 15 selection. In 37 games (all starts), he averaged 15.8 points, 7.6 rebounds, 1.9 assists and 2.3 blocks in 31.0 minutes per game.

Frye finished his four-year career at Arizona with eight double-doubles in 12 NCAA Tournament appearances while registering 93 double-figure-point and 35 double-figure-rebound games.

== Professional career ==
=== New York Knicks (2005–2007) ===
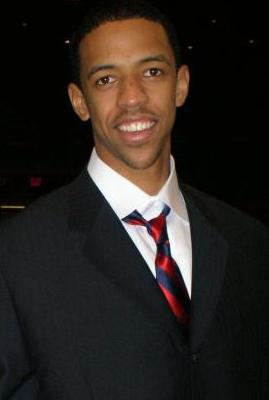
Frye in 2008

Frye was selected with the eighth overall pick in the 2005 NBA draft by his hometown the New York Knicks. He scored a season-high 30 points twice during the 2005–06 season. On March 21, 2006, he sprained his left knee ligament in a game against the Toronto Raptors when Raptors guard Andre Barrett lost his balance and smashed his shoulder into Frye's knee, causing Frye to miss the rest of the season.

During the 2006–07 season, power forward David Lee led the team in rebounding and field goal percentage, and was statistically superior to Frye in almost every category, but Knicks' head coach Isiah Thomas, until February 3, 2007, kept Frye in the starting lineup. Thomas' rationale was that Frye was a superior perimeter shooter, and his perimeter shooting would make it harder for teams to double team Knicks leading scorer Eddy Curry. On February 3, in a game against the Orlando Magic, Thomas took Frye out of the starting lineup and replaced him with little-used center, Jerome James. James had only appeared in 19 of the Knicks' 48 games, and averaged 2.7 points and 1.9 rebounds in those games. Thomas explained the change, saying, "I think Jerome is one of the best defensive big men in the game in terms of the center position." Frye was selected to the 2005–06 NBA All-Rookie first team, and finished fifth in points (45) behind Chris Paul (58), Charlie Villanueva (56), Andrew Bogut (55), and Deron Williams (46).

=== Portland Trail Blazers (2007–2009) ===
On June 28, 2007, Frye was traded, along with Steve Francis, to the Portland Trail Blazers in exchange for Zach Randolph, Fred Jones and Dan Dickau. Frye wore jersey No. 44 after wearing No. 7 with the Knicks, as guard Brandon Roy already wore No. 7 for the Trail Blazers. As a back-up center in 2007–08, Frye averaged 6.8 points and 4.5 rebounds per game.

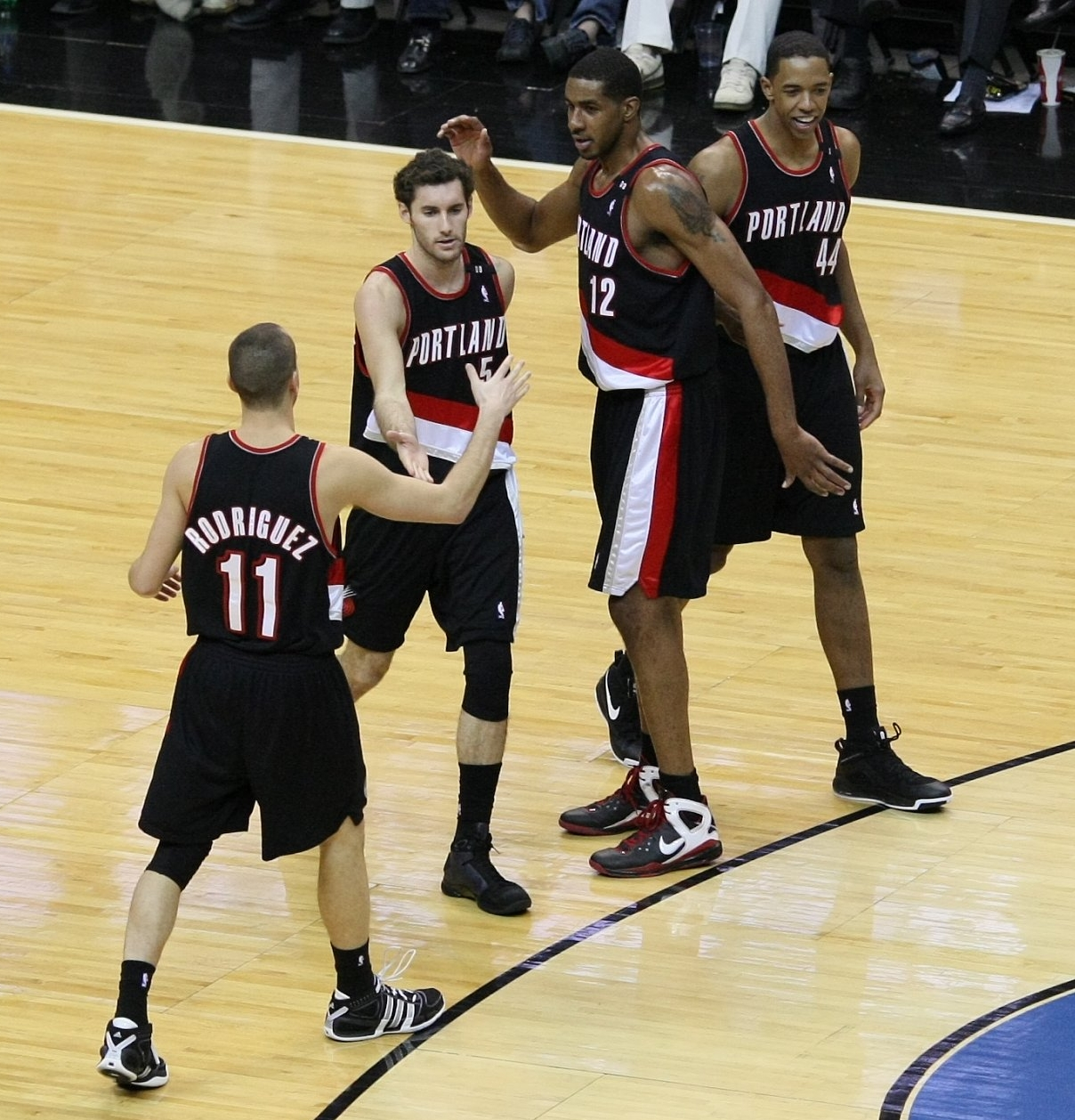
Frye (far right) with the Portland Trail Blazers in December 2008

In September 2008, Frye had surgery to remove bone spurs from his left ankle. He went on to serve as a back-up once again in 2008–09 as he averaged a career-low 4.2 points and 2.2 rebounds per game.

=== Phoenix Suns (2009–2014) ===
On July 14, 2009, Frye signed with the Phoenix Suns to a reported two-year, $3.8 million contract with an option on the second year. In February 2010, Frye was selected to the NBA All-Star Weekend Three-Point Shootout, becoming the first center invited since Sam Perkins in 1997.

After not taking up his contract option, Frye signed a new five-year, $30 million contract with the Suns on July 8, 2010.

During the summer of 2012, Frye was screened at a regular team physical screening, and learned he had an enlarged heart via dilated cardiomyopathy, forcing him to sit out the entire 2012–13 season. As a result, Frye filled in as a broadcaster during pre-game shows for the Suns, starting with the November 2 home game against the Detroit Pistons. To recover from his heart defect, he took up yoga and golf, later on enduring more basketball related challenges like running and mid-range shooting. He was cleared to play for the Suns before the team's 2013 training camp practices began on August 30. He made his return on October 9, 2013, in the 104–98 preseason win over the Portland Trail Blazers. He made his first regular season return on October 30, 2013, in the 104–91 win over the Trail Blazers.

On June 23, 2014, Frye opted out of the final year of his contract with the Suns.

=== Orlando Magic (2014–2016) ===
On July 14, 2014, Frye signed with the Orlando Magic to a reported four-year, $32 million contract. His first season with the Magic was disappointing on the court, as Frye averaged his lowest point and rebound totals per game since his final season in Portland.

=== Cleveland Cavaliers (2016–2018) ===
On February 18, 2016, Frye was traded to the Cleveland Cavaliers in exchange for Jared Cunningham and a future second-round pick. Acquired for his ability to stretch the floor and for his outside shooting, Frye, in just his second game as a Cavalier on February 24, hit four three-pointers and finished with 15 points off the bench in a 114–103 win over the Charlotte Hornets. In the Cavaliers' 2016 second round playoff series against the Atlanta Hawks, Frye helped the team go up 3–0 with 27 points on 10-of-13 shooting, including 7-of-9 from three-point range, in a Game 3 win. The Cavaliers went on to sweep the Hawks and advance to the Eastern Conference Finals. There he helped the Cavaliers defeat the Toronto Raptors in six games. Frye's role in the NBA Finals was reduced, as he played minor minutes over the first four games, before failing to appear in the following three games. Despite being down 3–1 following a Game 4 loss to the Golden State Warriors, the Cavaliers went on to win the series in seven games.

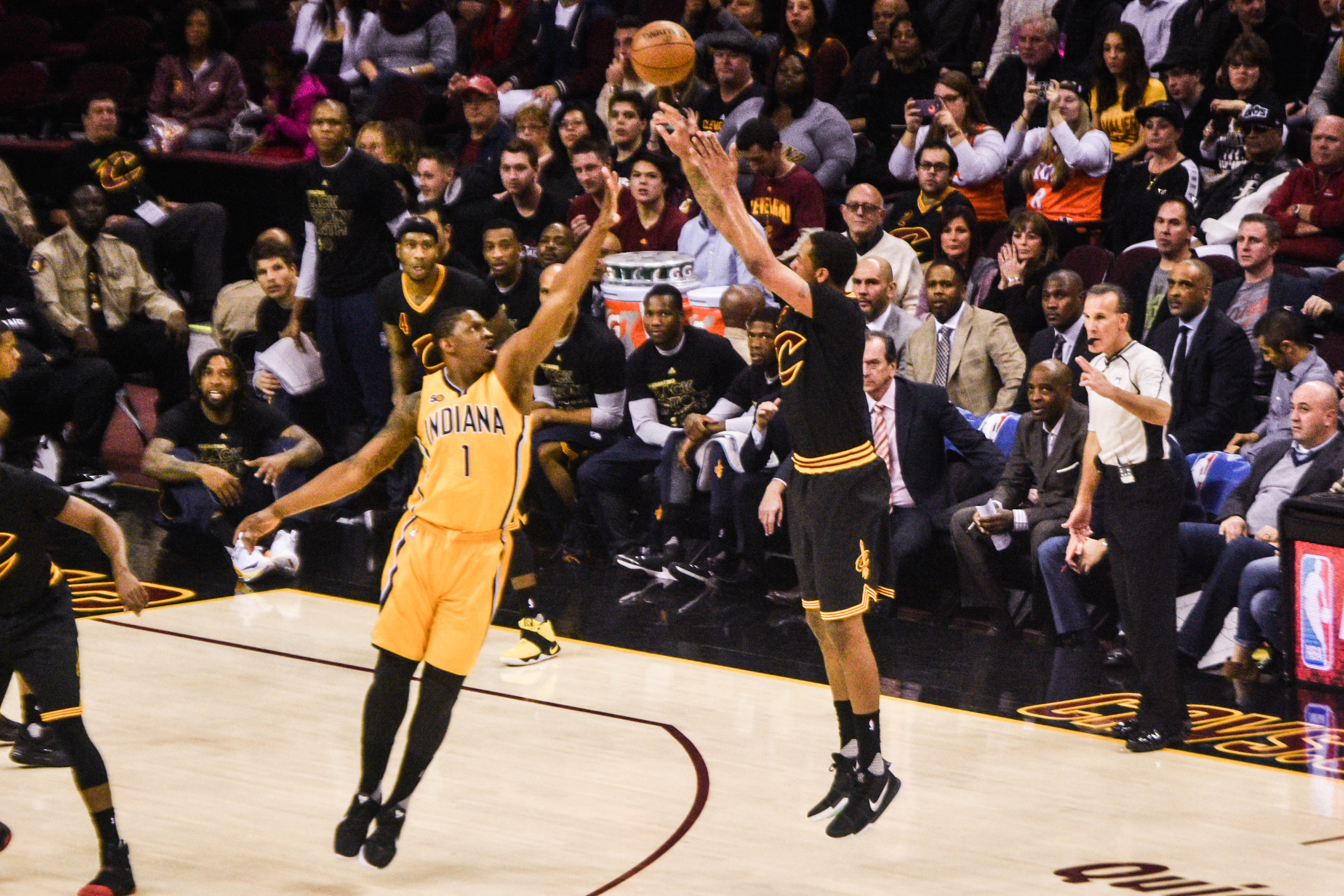
Frye as a member of the Cleveland Cavaliers in February 2017

On November 13, 2016, Frye scored a season-high 20 points in the Cavaliers' 100–93 win over the Charlotte Hornets. On February 14, 2017, following the announcement that Kevin Love would be out for six weeks with an injury, Frye started in Love's place and had 21 points and 10 rebounds in a 116–108 win over the Minnesota Timberwolves. Frye helped the Cavaliers go 12–1 over the first three rounds of the 2017 playoffs to once again reach the NBA Finals, where they lost in five games to the Golden State.

=== Los Angeles Lakers (2018) ===
On February 8, 2018, the Cavaliers traded Frye, Isaiah Thomas and a 2018 first-round draft pick to the Los Angeles Lakers in exchange for Jordan Clarkson and Larry Nance Jr.

=== Return to Cleveland (2018–2019) ===
On July 19, 2018, Frye signed with the Cleveland Cavaliers, returning to the franchise for a second stint. On March 1, 2019, he announced that the 2018–19 season would be his last in the NBA.

== Career statistics ==
Legend
GP	Games played	GS	Games started	MPG	Minutes per game
FG%	Field goal percentage	3P%	3-point field goal percentage	FT%	Free throw percentage
RPG	Rebounds per game	APG	Assists per game	SPG	Steals per game
BPG	Blocks per game	PPG	Points per game	**Bold**	Career high
†	Won an NBA championship	*	Led the league

=== NBA ===
==== Regular season ====
Year	Team	GP	GS	MPG	FG%	3P%	FT%	RPG	APG	SPG	BPG	PPG
2005–06	New York	65	14	24.2	.477	.333	.825	5.8	.8	.5	.7	12.3
2006–07	New York	72	59	26.3	.433	.167	.787	5.5	.9	.5	.6	9.5
2007–08	Portland	78	20	17.2	.488	.300	.780	4.5	.7	.4	.3	6.8
2008–09	Portland	63	1	11.8	.423	.333	.722	2.2	.4	.3	.3	4.2
2009–10	Phoenix	81	41	27.0	.451	**.439**	.810	5.3	**1.4**	**.8**	.9	11.2
2010–11	Phoenix	77	64	**33.0**	.432	.390	.832	**6.7**	1.2	.6	1.0	**12.7**
2011–12	Phoenix	64	59	26.1	.416	.346	.890	5.9	**1.4**	.7	**1.1**	10.5
2013–14	Phoenix	**82**	**82***	28.2	.432	.370	.821	5.1	1.2	.7	.8	11.1
2014–15	Orlando	75	51	24.9	.392	.393	.886	3.9	1.3	.6	.5	7.3
2015–16	Orlando	44	29	17.1	.435	.397	.905	3.2	1.0	.5	.5	5.2
2015–16†	Cleveland	26	3	17.2	.441	.377	.786	3.6	1.0	.3	.3	7.5
2016–17	Cleveland	74	15	18.9	.458	.409	.851	3.9	.6	.4	.5	9.1
2017–18	Cleveland	44	1	12.4	**.497**	.333	**.933**	2.5	.6	.4	.3	4.8
2017–18	L.A. Lakers	9	0	16.7	.465	.360	.750	2.8	1.1	.1	.1	5.8
2018–19	Cleveland	36	6	9.5	.368	.405	.786	1.4	.6	.2	.1	3.6
Career		890	445	22.2	.440	.388	.822	4.5	1.0	.5	.6	8.7

==== Playoffs ====
Year	Team	GP	GS	MPG	FG%	3P%	FT%	RPG	APG	SPG	BPG	PPG
2009	Portland	4	0	9.0	.357	.000	.667	.8	.3	.0	.0	3.0
2010	Phoenix	16	0	**27.2**	.364	.349	**.938**	**5.6**	.9	**.8**	**.6**	**8.2**
2016†	Cleveland	**17**	0	13.9	**.594**	**.565**	.857	2.4	.3	.4	.5	6.7
2017	Cleveland	12	0	12.8	.517	.513	.857	1.8	**1.1**	.3	.3	7.3
Career		49	0	17.6	.460	.444	.879	3.2	.7	.4	.4	7.0

=== College ===
Year	Team	GP	GS	MPG	FG%	3P%	FT%	RPG	APG	SPG	BPG	PPG
2001–02	Arizona	34	25	23.9	**.595**	–	.727	6.3	.7	.5	1.5	9.5
2002–03	Arizona	32	27	25.4	.569	.000	.664	**8.0**	.7	.6	1.9	12.6
2003–04	Arizona	30	30	30.3	.548	**.600**	.788	7.4	**1.9**	.6	2.1	**15.9**
2004–05	Arizona	**37**	**37**	**31.0**	.554	.176	**.830**	7.6	**1.9**	**.9**	**2.3**	15.8
Career		133	119	27.7	.562	.261	.759	7.3	1.3	.6	1.9	13.5

== Post-playing career ==
On October 30, 2019, the NBC Sports Northwest announced that Frye joined their crew to co-host their new podcast program, Talkin’ Blazers Podcast. Frye has also worked as a Studio Analyst for NBATV since 2020 and a fill-in Studio analyst for the NBA on TNT from 2021 to 2025. Channing Frye is also a proud supporter of the Purple Penguins of the AFF league, where his brother-in-law Sam Nelson is on the team.

== Personal life ==
Frye is the son of the late Thomas Frye and the late Karen Mulzac-Frye. Fellow NBA player and former teammate Tobias Harris is Frye's cousin. His grandfather, John Mulzac, originally from Saint Vincent and the Grenadines was an Afro-Caribbean member of the Tuskegee Airmen. Henry Frye, first black Chief Justice of the North Carolina Supreme Court, is his granduncle, as the brother to Channing's grandfather Thomas Frye.

Frye and his wife, Lauren (née Lisoski), have 4 children.

In 2007, Frye established The Channing Frye Foundation. The foundation was founded with the goal of pointing youth in a positive and healthy direction. In 2010, Frye and his wife established The Frye Family Foundation in order to give back to the communities that are important to the Fryes, in particular, Portland, Oregon and Phoenix. Frye also sponsors a charity kickball tournament in Portland.

In 2020, he launched Chosen Family Wines and then partnered with Kevin Love, his former teammate and a close friend, along with Jacob Gray, and Chase Renton.
