= Robin Lopez =

American basketball player (born 1988)

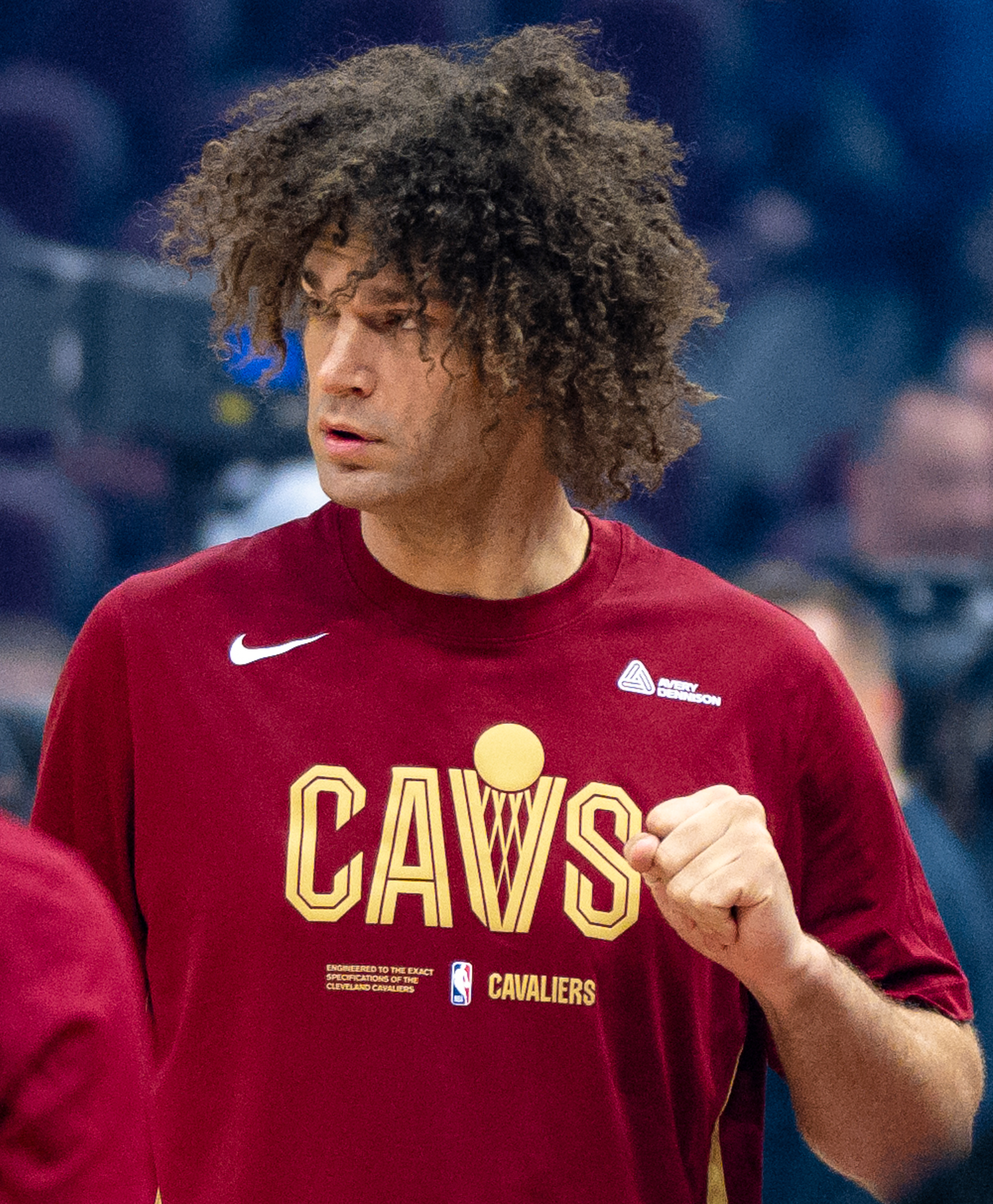
- Lopez with the Cleveland Cavaliers in 2022

Personal information
- Born: April 1, 1988 (age 38) Los Angeles, California, U.S.
- Listed height: 7 ft 1 in (2.16 m)
- Listed weight: 281 lb (127 kg)

Career information
- High school: San Joaquin Memorial (Fresno, California)
- College: Stanford (2006–2008)
- NBA draft: 2008: 1st round, 15th overall pick
- Drafted by: Phoenix Suns
- Playing career: 2008–2024
- Position: Center
- Number: 15, 42, 8, 33

Career history
- 2008–2012: Phoenix Suns
- 2012–2013: New Orleans Hornets
- 2013–2015: Portland Trail Blazers
- 2015–2016: New York Knicks
- 2016–2019: Chicago Bulls
- 2019–2020: Milwaukee Bucks
- 2020–2021: Washington Wizards
- 2021–2022: Orlando Magic
- 2022–2023: Cleveland Cavaliers
- 2023–2024: Milwaukee Bucks

Career highlights
- Pac-10 All-Defensive Team (2008); Third-team Parade All-American (2006); McDonald's All-American (2006)
- Stats at NBA.com
- Stats at Basketball Reference

Robin Byron Lopez (born April 1, 1988) is an American former professional basketball player in the National Basketball Association (NBA). He was selected with the 15th pick in the 2008 NBA draft by the Phoenix Suns, was traded to the New Orleans Hornets in 2012 and was traded to Portland in 2013. He played college basketball for the Stanford Cardinal alongside his twin brother Brook Lopez. He played for nine NBA teams, including a three-year stint with the Chicago Bulls and two stints with the Milwaukee Bucks.

== Early life ==
Lopez was born in Panorama City, California, to Heriberto Lopez, a Cuban baseball player, and Deborah Ledford, a swimmer. He attended San Joaquin Memorial High School in Fresno, California, where he was named a McDonald's All-American in 2006.

== College career ==
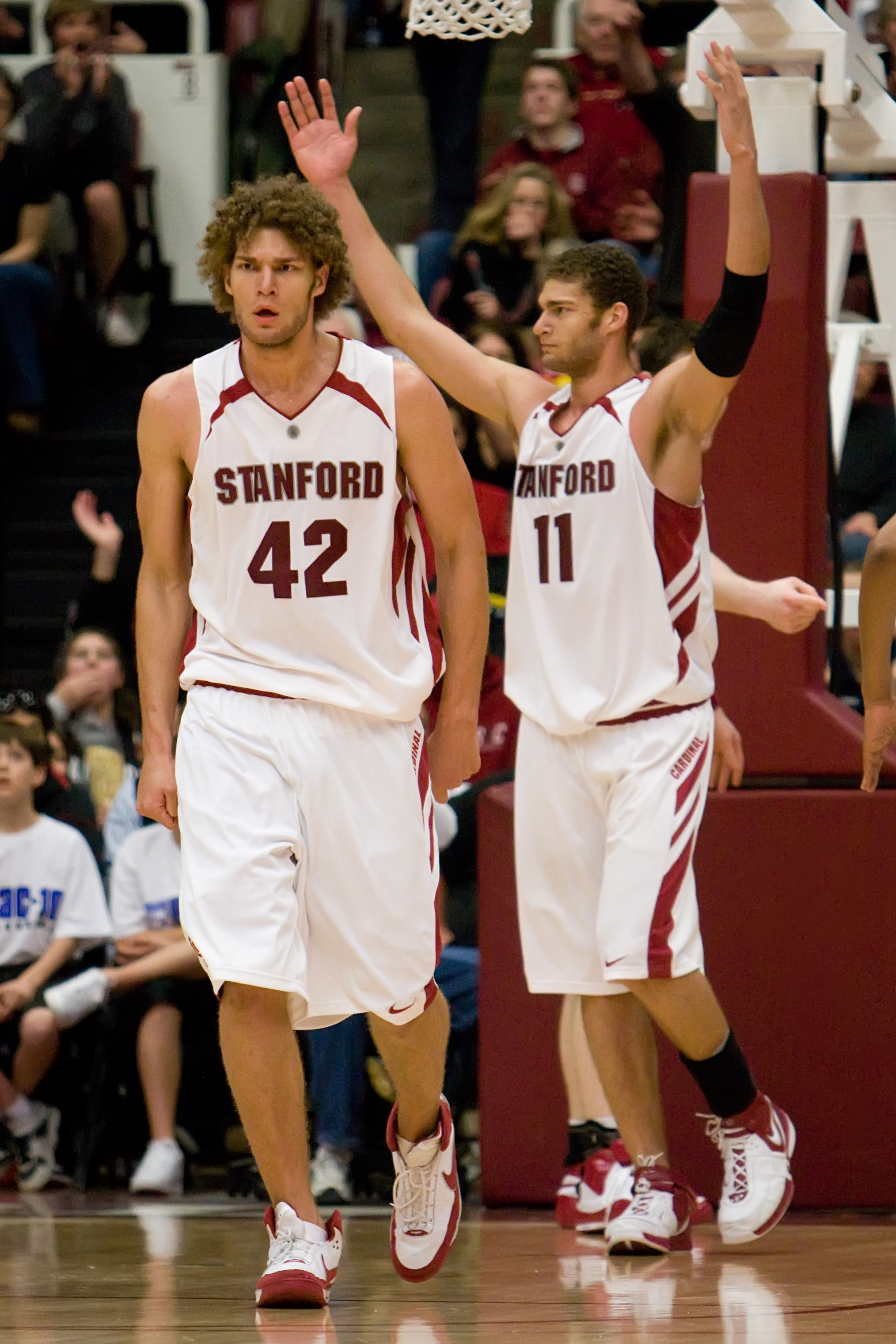
Lopez (left) with his twin brother Brook at Stanford

Lopez was one of just three players for the Cardinal team to start all 31 games in the 2006–07 season. He averaged 7.5 points and 5.5 rebounds per game, while averaging 24 minutes. He led the team with 73 blocked shots, breaking the Stanford record for a freshman and recording the second highest single season record in Stanford history. This mark also was the highest in the Pacific-10 conference. With his twin brother, Brook, the two blocked more shots than seven Pac-10 teams. Lopez also had two double-doubles on the season.

Lopez had his 100th career block in a game versus Santa Clara University on December 19, 2007. In his sophomore season, Lopez achieved All-Pac-10 Defensive Team honors while also being named an Honorable Mention to the All-Pac-10 team. He was second in the Pac-10 in blocks for the season. With 83 blocks in his second season, Lopez moved into second place all time for career blocks by a Stanford player.

Lopez declared that he would enter the 2008 NBA draft on March 31, 2008, after just two seasons at Stanford.

== Professional career ==
=== Phoenix Suns (2008–2012) ===
Lopez was selected with the 15th overall pick by the Phoenix Suns in the 2008 NBA draft. After being drafted by the Suns, Lopez said: "I was hoping I'd drop. I think I was the only person in the draft that was hoping he'd drop."

Lopez joined a Suns team already featuring one of the all-time great centers in Shaquille O'Neal, and thus was not expected to get many minutes during his rookie season. He got the first start of his career on November 7, 2008, against the Chicago Bulls in place of the injured O'Neal; he played 30 minutes, scored 14 points, grabbed 7 rebounds and had 2 blocks. For his rookie season, Lopez only saw an average of 10.2 minutes per game, with 3.2 points and 2 rebounds. At the end of the season, Shaq was traded to the Cleveland Cavaliers, making Lopez the assumed starting center.

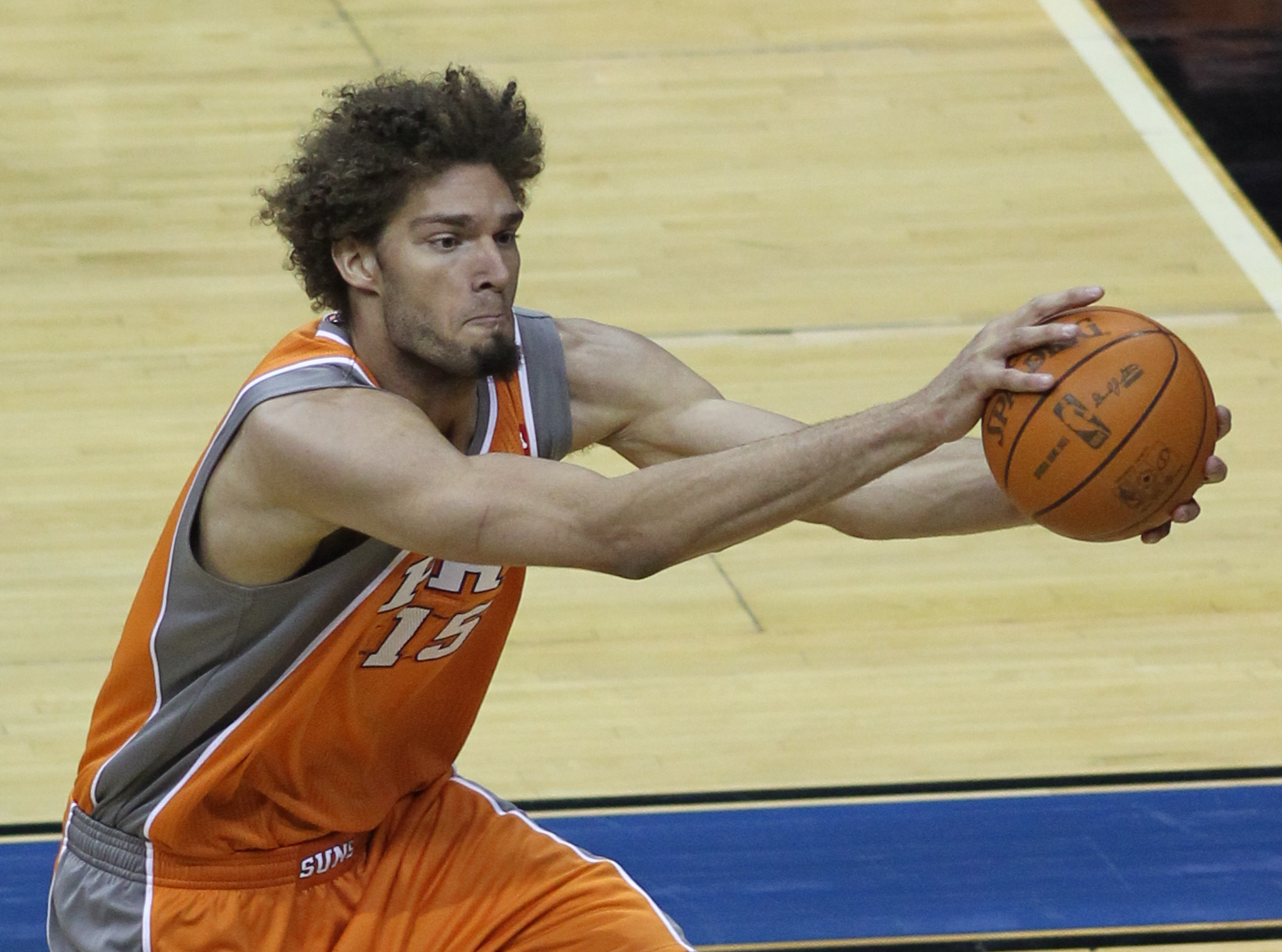
Lopez with the Suns in January 2011

During the 2009–10 regular season, Lopez averaged 8.4 points, 4.9 rebounds, and 1.0 block per game. During the end of the season, however, Lopez was injured, and was replaced by Jarron Collins until the Western Conference Finals against the Los Angeles Lakers, where the Suns eventually lost, 4 games to 2.

After the 2009–10 season, Lopez went into a major decline, despite starting and playing more games. During December 2010, he was injured again, and he was temporarily replaced by Earl Barron. This eventually resulted in decreased production from Lopez, which forced the Suns to trade for Marcin Gortat. While Lopez was still starting for the Suns, his stats were quickly declining, while Gortat's stats were improving. This forced Lopez to eventually become a bench player again. Lopez would average 6.4 points and 3.2 rebounds at an average of 14.8 minutes per game.

In the shortened 2011–12 NBA season, Lopez did not start any games for the Suns, but did play in 64 games. Because of Gortat's increased production at center, Lopez was forced to become a back-up center once again. He averaged 5.4 points with an average of 14 minutes per game there.

=== New Orleans Hornets (2012–2013) ===
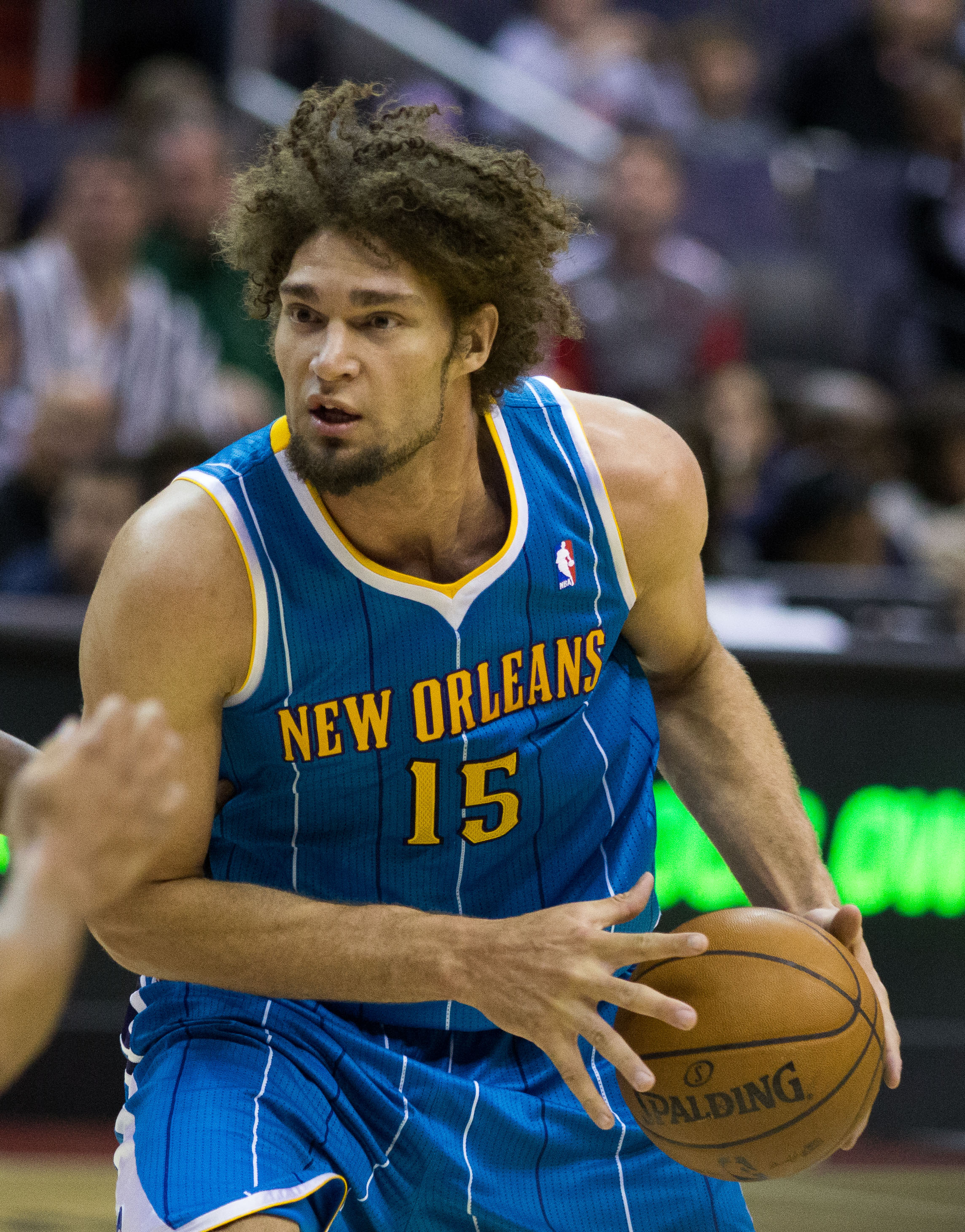
Lopez with the Hornets in 2013

On July 27, 2012, the New Orleans Hornets acquired Lopez and Hakim Warrick in a three-team sign-and-trade deal involving the Minnesota Timberwolves, which sent Brad Miller, Wesley Johnson and Jerome Dyson to the Suns. It was during this time that Lopez would produce his best results yet, starting for every game of the season and gaining new career highs in almost every field in the process.

=== Portland Trail Blazers (2013–2015) ===
On July 10, 2013, New Orleans traded Lopez to the Portland Trail Blazers as a part of a three-way trade that also involved the Sacramento Kings. In his first season with the Trail Blazers, he recorded 29 double-doubles and set the franchise single season record for offensive rebounds.

Due to his presence in the Portland community, as well as his consistent and blue-collar style of play, Lopez was a fan favorite amongst the Portland faithful. He was honored with the Maurice Lucas Award in March 2014 for his efforts in his "Read Big" literacy campaign with Portland Public Schools.

On December 16, 2014, Lopez was ruled out for a month after breaking his hand against San Antonio the night before.

=== New York Knicks (2015–2016) ===
On July 9, 2015, Lopez signed with the New York Knicks. In February 2016, Lopez had two 26-point, 16-rebound games, both season highs. On March 20, 2016, he recorded 23 points and a career-high 20 rebounds in an 88–80 loss to the Sacramento Kings.

=== Chicago Bulls (2016–2019) ===
On June 22, 2016, Lopez was traded, along with José Calderón and Jerian Grant, to the Chicago Bulls in exchange for Derrick Rose, Justin Holiday and a 2017 second-round draft pick. On March 17, 2017, he scored a season-high 25 points in a 112–107 loss to the Washington Wizards.

=== Milwaukee Bucks (2019–2020) ===
On July 12, 2019, Lopez signed with the Milwaukee Bucks, putting him on the same NBA team as his twin brother.

=== Washington Wizards (2020–2021) ===
On November 22, 2020, Lopez signed with the Washington Wizards. During his Wizards stint, his signature hookshot made him a good scoring option off the bench. On May 6, 2021, Lopez scored a season-high 24 points against the Toronto Raptors. Lopez had the third best field goal percentage in the whole league in the 2020–21 NBA season.

=== Orlando Magic (2021–2022) ===
On August 6, 2021, Lopez signed with the Orlando Magic.

=== Cleveland Cavaliers (2022–2023) ===
On July 8, 2022, Lopez signed with the Cleveland Cavaliers.

=== Return to Milwaukee (2023–2024) ===
On July 7, 2023, Lopez signed with the Milwaukee Bucks, reuniting him with his twin brother Brook. On February 8, 2024, Lopez was traded to the Sacramento Kings and was subsequently waived.

== Career statistics ==
Legend
GP	Games played	GS	Games started	MPG	Minutes per game
FG%	Field goal percentage	3P%	3-point field goal percentage	FT%	Free throw percentage
RPG	Rebounds per game	APG	Assists per game	SPG	Steals per game
BPG	Blocks per game	PPG	Points per game	**Bold**	Career high
*	Led the league

=== NBA ===
==== Regular season ====
Year	Team	GP	GS	MPG	FG%	3P%	FT%	RPG	APG	SPG	BPG	PPG
2008–09	Phoenix	60	7	10.2	.518	.000	.691	2.0	.1	.2	.7	3.2
2009–10	Phoenix	51	31	19.3	.588	—	.704	4.9	.1	.2	1.0	8.4
2010–11	Phoenix	67	56	14.8	.501	—	.740	3.2	.1	.3	.7	6.4
2011–12	Phoenix	64	0	14.0	.461	—	.714	3.3	.3	.3	.9	5.4
2012–13	New Orleans	**82***	**82***	26.0	.534	—	.778	5.6	.8	**.4**	1.6	11.3
2013–14	Portland	**82**	**82***	**31.8**	.551	.000	.818	**8.5**	.9	.3	**1.7**	11.1
2014–15	Portland	59	59	27.8	.535	.000	.772	6.7	.9	.3	1.4	9.6
2015–16	New York	**82***	**82***	27.1	.539	.000	.795	7.3	1.4	.2	1.6	10.3
2016–17	Chicago	81	81	28.0	.493	.000	.721	6.4	1.0	.2	1.4	10.4
2017–18	Chicago	64	64	26.4	.530	.286	.756	4.5	**1.9**	.2	.8	**11.8**
2018–19	Chicago	74	36	21.7	.568	.226	.724	3.9	1.2	.1	1.1	9.5
2019–20	Milwaukee	66	5	14.5	.492	.333	.528	2.4	.7	.2	.7	5.4
2020–21	Washington	71	9	19.1	.633	.278	.723	3.8	.8	.2	.6	9.0
2021–22	Orlando	36	9	17.0	.553	.333	.593	3.5	1.5	.1	.5	7.1
2022–23	Cleveland	37	2	8.1	**.640**	**.500**	.778	1.4	.5	.1	.2	3.0
2023–24	Milwaukee	16	2	4.0	.368	.250	**1.000**	.3	.3	.1	.2	1.1
Career		992	607	21.1	.537	.297	.743	4.7	.8	.2	1.1	8.4

==== Playoffs ====
Year	Team	GP	GS	MPG	FG%	3P%	FT%	RPG	APG	SPG	BPG	PPG
2010	Phoenix	6	6	17.3	.543	—	**1.000**	4.0	.0	.3	.2	7.8
2014	Portland	**11**	**11**	**33.4**	.489	—	.667	**9.2**	**.8**	**.5**	**1.8**	10.0
2015	Portland	5	5	23.4	.600	—	**1.000**	4.4	.6	.2	1.0	5.2
2017	Chicago	6	6	27.0	.654	—	**1.000**	7.2	**.8**	**.5**	1.0	**12.7**
2020	Milwaukee	3	0	7.0	.750	—	.000	1.3	.0	.0	.0	2.0
2021	Washington	5	0	14.6	.720	—	.250	1.8	.0	.0	.8	7.4
2023	Cleveland	2	0	3.0	**1.000**	—	**1.000**	.5	.0	.0	.0	4.0
Career		38	28	22.4	.581	—	.776	5.4	.4	.3	.9	8.2

=== College ===
Year	Team	GP	GS	MPG	FG%	3P%	FT%	RPG	APG	SPG	BPG	PPG
2006–07	Stanford	31	**31**	24.0	.480	.000	.545	5.5	**.9**	.2	**2.4**	7.5
2007–08	Stanford	**36**	30	**24.5**	**.534**	**1.000**	**.652**	**5.7**	.6	**.5**	2.3	**10.2**
Career		67	61	24.3	.511	.500	.612	5.6	.8	.3	2.3	9.0

== Personal life ==
Lopez has three brothers: Chris, Alex, and twin brother Brook. Alex played college basketball for Washington and Santa Clara, and professionally in Japan, New Zealand and Spain, while Brook also plays in the NBA for the Los Angeles Clippers.

Lopez maintains his offseason home in Portland, Oregon, even though he no longer plays for the Portland Trail Blazers.

Lopez is an avid comic book enthusiast and also participated in theater productions at Stanford in California. In 2026, he publicly opposed Enes Kanter Freedom and Royce White’s attempts to join the WNBA as trans women.

Robin is younger than his twin brother Brook by one minute.

== See also ==
- 2006 high school boys basketball All-Americans
