= Dwayne Collins =

American basketball player (1988–2025)

Personal information
- Born: April 13, 1988 Miami, Florida, U.S.
- Died: April 16, 2025 (aged 37)
- Listed height: 6 ft 8 in (2.03 m)
- Listed weight: 241 lb (109 kg)

Career information
- High school: Miami Senior (Miami, Florida)
- College: Miami (Florida) (2006–2010)
- NBA draft: 2010: 2nd round, 60th overall pick
- Drafted by: Phoenix Suns
- Playing career: 2010–2011
- Position: Power forward
- Stats at Basketball Reference

Dwayne Collins (April 13, 1988 – April 16, 2025) was an American professional basketball player. A power forward, Collins played college basketball for the Miami Hurricanes before being selected with the final pick in the 2010 NBA draft by the Phoenix Suns.

== Background ==
Collins was born in Miami, Florida on April 13, 1988. He was a graduate of Miami Senior High School, where he was a star basketball player. He led the school's team to a state championship his junior year, and he was an all-state and All-Dade County selection as a junior and senior during high school. Before college, Collins played for the Miami Tropics team at Miami Prep School.

He attended college at University of Miami and was a standout basketball player for the Hurricanes, having a 60 percent shooting percentage his final season. He was the second player in the school's history to reach 1,000 points, 850 rebounds and 100 assists.

== College statistics ==
Year	Team	GP	GS	MPG	FG%	3P%	FT%	RPG	APG	SPG	BPG	PPG
2006–07	Miami	32	22	25.2	.538	.000	.579	6.5	.6	.6	.6	8.6
2007–08	Miami	34	18	20.0	.550	.000	.500	6.5	.4	.5	.9	8.6
2008–09	Miami	31	31	24.9	.565	.000	.583	7.3	1.3	1.0	.4	10.6
2009–10	Miami	29	28	24.7	.604	.000	.569	7.8	1.2	.6	1.1	12.0
Career		126	99	23.6	.565	.000	.563	7.0	.9	.7	.7	9.9

== Professional athletic career ==
Collins was drafted 60th overall by the Phoenix Suns in the 2010 NBA draft but did not play with the team that season. He signed with Italian team Cimberio Varese for the 2010–11 season, but he was let go prior to the start of the season after sustaining a knee injury.

Due to the knee injury, Collins' next stint came in July 2013 when he joined the Suns for the 2013 NBA Summer League. In five games for the Suns, he averaged 1.2 points in 5.3 minutes per game.

== Other pursuits ==
After basketball, Collins worked in New Jersey as a superintendent.

== Personal life and death ==
Collins was known for his humor, evidenced by a tattoo he displayed publicly which stated, "Mr. Irrelevant", an indicating nickname for the person chosen last in a sports draft, which he used as a motivator.

Collins died on April 16, 2025, at the age of 37. The cause of death was not announced but a heart attack was the suspected cause of death according to multiple sources.
