= List of 2013–14 NBA season transactions =

This is a list of all personnel changes for the 2013 NBA off-season and 2013–14 NBA season.

== Retirement ==
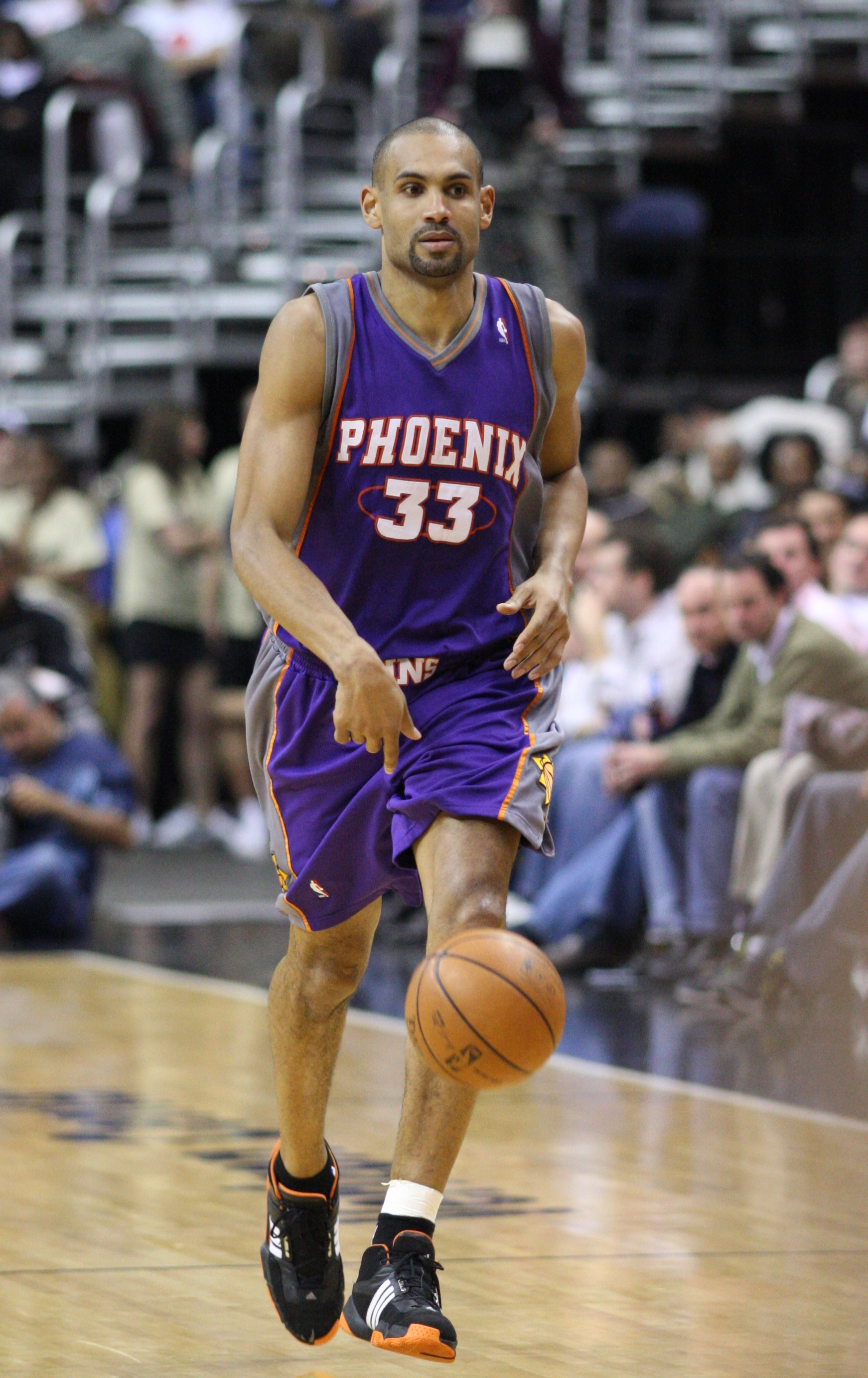
Grant Hill with the Suns on December 8, 2007

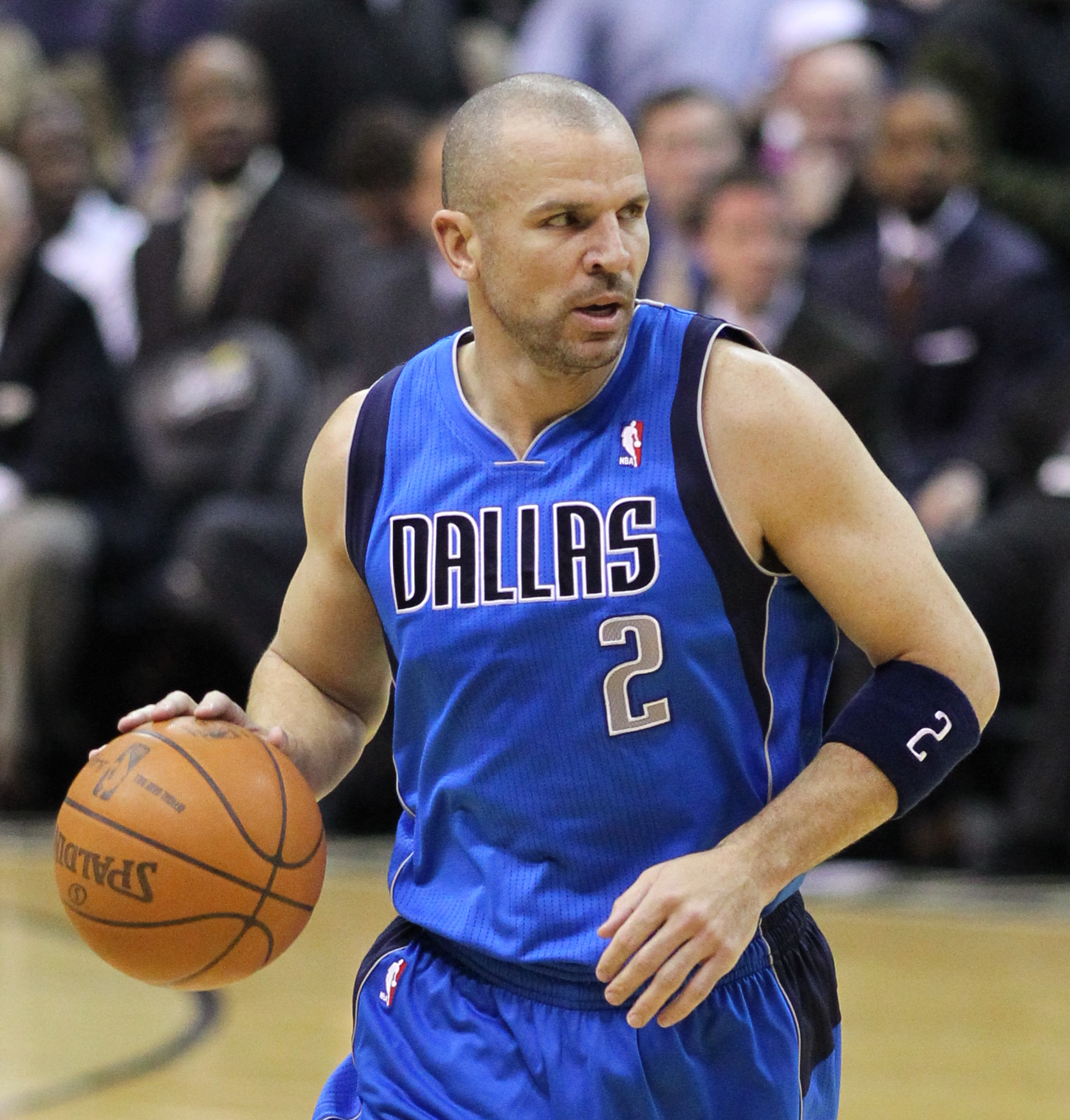
Jason Kidd during his second tenure with the Mavericks

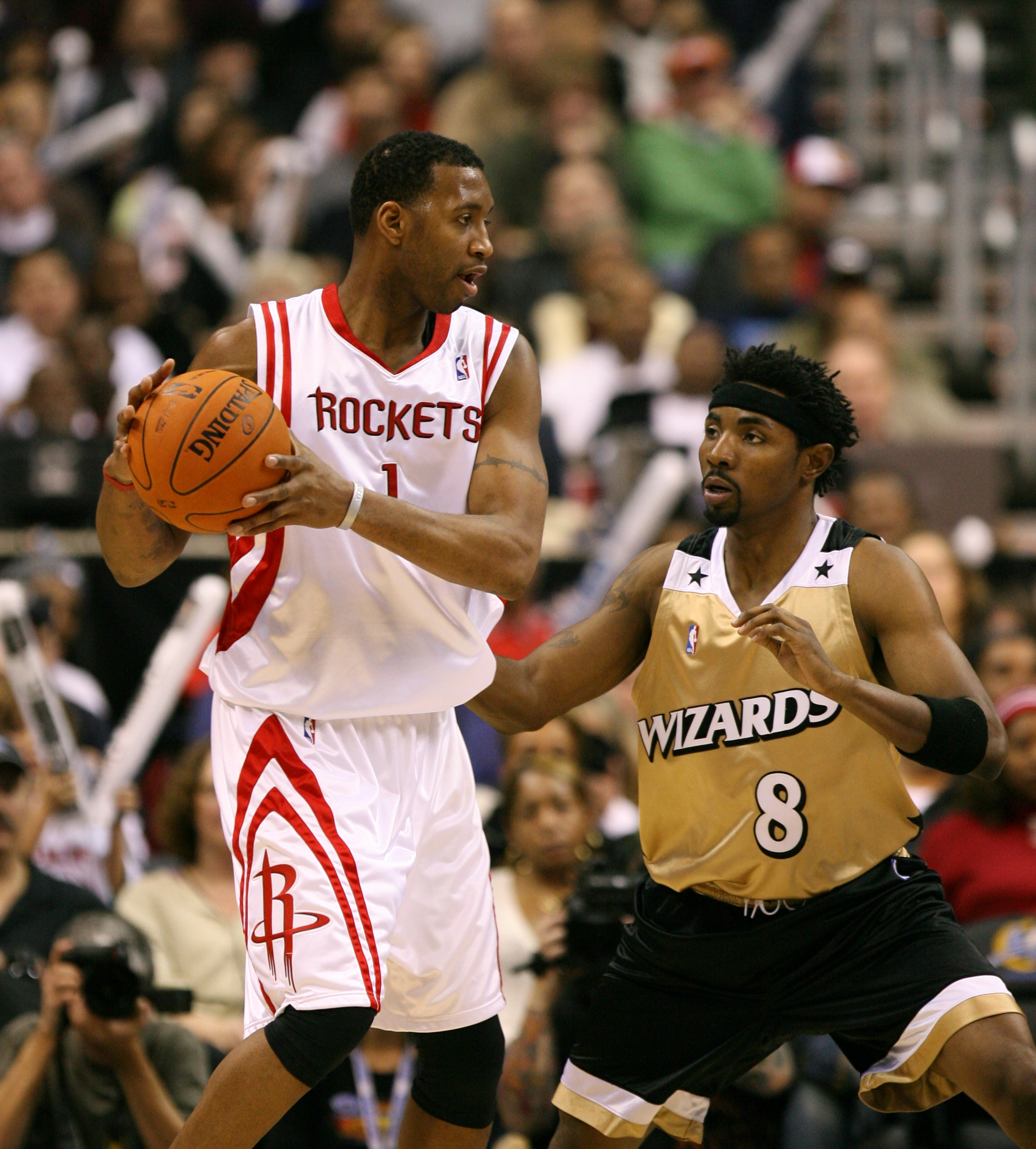
Tracy McGrady with the Rockets being defended by Roger Mason Jr.

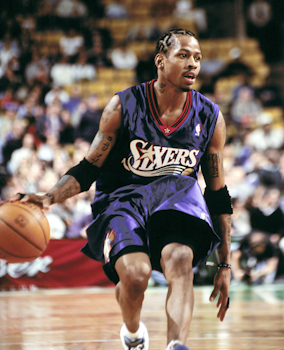
Allen Iverson with the Sixers in 2001

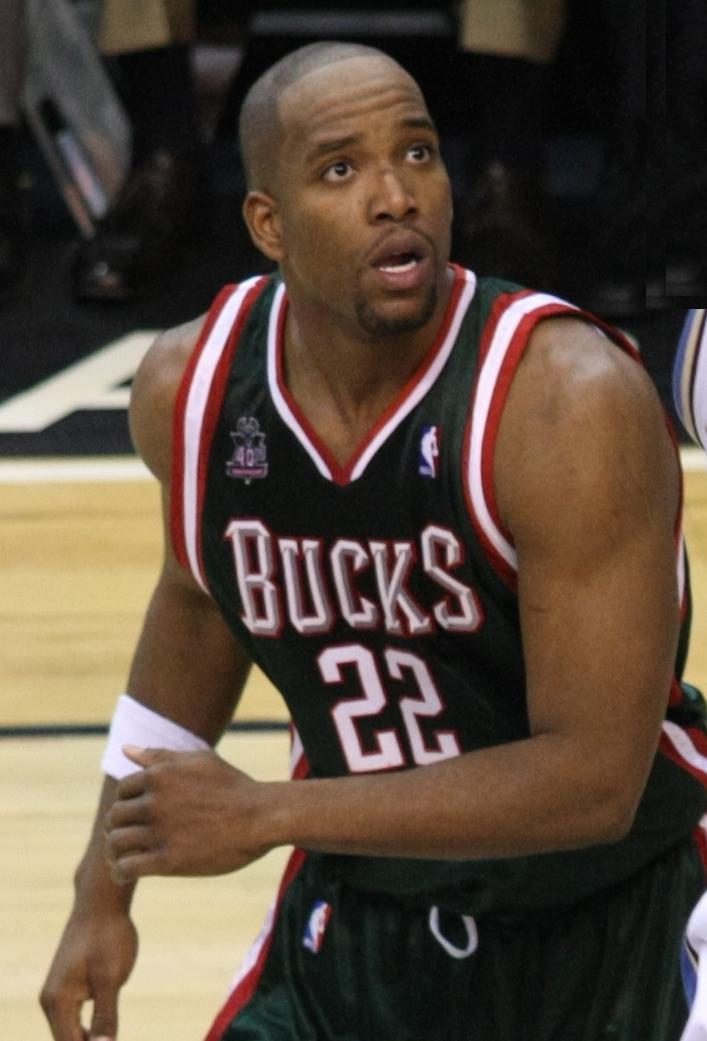
Michael Redd with the Bucks in April 2008

Date	Name	Team(s) played (years)	Age	Notes	Ref.
May 30	Eddy Curry	Chicago Bulls (2001–2005); New York Knicks (2005–2010); Miami Heat (2011–2012); Dallas Mavericks (2012)	30		
June 1	Grant Hill	Detroit Pistons (1994–2000); Orlando Magic (2000–2007); Phoenix Suns (2007–2012); Los Angeles Clippers (2012–2013)	40	Hill was the second-oldest player in the league during the 2012–13 season, behind Kurt Thomas.	
June 3	Jason Kidd	Dallas Mavericks (1994–1996, 2008–2012); Phoenix Suns (1996–2001); New Jersey Nets (2001–2008); New York Knicks (2012–2013)	40	Kidd retired two days after Grant Hill, who was co-Rookie of the Year with Kidd in 1994–95. Hired as head coach for the now Brooklyn Nets 9 days later	
June 23	Brandon Roy	Portland Trail Blazers (2006–2011); Minnesota Timberwolves (2012–2013)	28	Second retirement	
July 25	Adam Morrison	Charlotte Bobcats (2006–2009); Los Angeles Lakers (2009–2010)	29	Morrison played in Serbia and Turkey during the 2011–12 season. He immediately joined the coaching staff of his former college team, the Gonzaga Bulldogs, as a student assistant.	
August 26	Tracy McGrady	Toronto Raptors (1997–2000); Orlando Magic (2000–2004); Houston Rockets (2004–2010); Detroit Pistons (2010–2011); Atlanta Hawks (2011–2012); San Antonio Spurs (2013)	34	Also played for the Qingdao Eagles in China throughout 2012–13. In April 2014, signed with the Sugar Land Skeeters of the Atlantic League as a pitcher.	
September 17	Jared Jeffries	Washington Wizards (2002–2006); New York Knicks (2006–2010, 2011–2012); Houston Rockets (2010–2011); Portland Trail Blazers (2012–2013)	31	Hired as a scout for the Denver Nuggets	
September 23	James Posey	Denver Nuggets (1999–2002); Houston Rockets (2002–2003); Memphis Grizzlies (2003–2005); Miami Heat (2005–2007); Boston Celtics (2007–2008); New Orleans Hornets (2008–2010); Indiana Pacers (2010–2011)	36	Hired as an assistant coach for the Canton Charge	
September 28	Juwan Howard	Washington Bullets / Wizards (1994–2001); Dallas Mavericks (2000–2002, 2007–2008); Denver Nuggets (2002–2003, 2008); Orlando Magic (2003–2004); Houston Rockets (2004–2007); Charlotte Bobcats (2008–2009); Portland Trail Blazers (2009–2010); Miami Heat (2010–2013)	40	Hired as player development coach for the Heat	
September 30	Anthony Carter	Miami Heat (1999–2003); San Antonio Spurs (2003); Minnesota Timberwolves (2004–2006); Denver Nuggets (2007–2011); New York Knicks (2011); Toronto Raptors (2011–2012)	38	Hired as assistant coach for the Austin Toros of the D-League.	
October 7	Vladimir Radmanović	Seattle SuperSonics (2001–2006); Los Angeles Clippers (2006); Los Angeles Lakers (2006–2009); Charlotte Bobcats (2009); Golden State Warriors (2009–2011); Atlanta Hawks (2011–2012); Chicago Bulls (2012–2013)	32	Played in Serbia from 1997 to 2001.	
October 28	Chris Quinn	Miami Heat (2006–2010); New Jersey Nets (2010); San Antonio Spurs (2010–2011); Cleveland Cavaliers (2012–2013)	30	Was hired as a director of player development for Notre Dame.	
October 30	Allen Iverson	Philadelphia 76ers (1996–2006, 2009–2010); Denver Nuggets (2006–2008); Detroit Pistons (2008–2009); Memphis Grizzlies (2009)	38	In 2010, Iverson had a brief stint in Turkey.	
November 4	Luke Walton	Los Angeles Lakers (2003–2012); Cleveland Cavaliers (2012–2013)	33	Was hired as a player development coach for the Los Angeles D-Fenders of the D-League.	
November 6	Michael Redd	Milwaukee Bucks (2000–2011); Phoenix Suns (2011–2012)	34	Redd was also an Olympic gold medalist in 2008.	
December 11	Rob Kurz	Golden State Warriors (2008–2009)	28	Also played in the D-League and overseas	
January 29	Keyon Dooling	Los Angeles Clippers (2000–2004); Miami Heat (2004–2005); Orlando Magic (2005–2008); New Jersey Nets (2008–2010); Milwaukee Bucks (2010–2011); Boston Celtics (2011–2012); Memphis Grizzlies (2013)	34	Second retirement. Became a life coach for the NBA and NBA D-League.	
February 13	Raja Bell	Philadelphia 76ers (2001–2002); Dallas Mavericks (2002–2003); Utah Jazz (2003–2005, 2010–2013); Phoenix Suns (2005–2008); Charlotte Bobcats (2008–2009); Golden State Warriors (2009–2010)	37	Bell played his rookie season (1999–2000) for the Yakima Sun Kings of the CBA.	
April 30	Chris Duhon	Chicago Bulls (2004–2008); New York Knicks (2008–2010); Orlando Magic (2010–2012); Los Angeles Lakers (2012–2013)	31	Became an assistant coach at Marshall University.	

== Front office movements ==
=== Head coach changes ===
Off-season

Hire date	Team	Outgoing head coach	Reason for departure	Incoming head coach	Last coaching position	Ref.
April 24	Cleveland Cavaliers	Byron Scott	Fired	Mike Brown	Los Angeles Lakers head coach (2011–2012)	
May 28	Phoenix Suns	Lindsey Hunter	Interim coach, contract not renewed	Jeff Hornacek	Utah Jazz assistant coach (2011–2013)	
May 28	Atlanta Hawks	Larry Drew	Contract not renewed	Mike Budenholzer	San Antonio Spurs assistant coach (1996–2013)	
May 29	Charlotte Bobcats	Mike Dunlap	Fired	Steve Clifford	Los Angeles Lakers assistant coach (2012–2013)	
May 31	Milwaukee Bucks	Jim Boylan	Fired	Larry Drew	Atlanta Hawks head coach (2010–2013)	
June 2	Sacramento Kings	Keith Smart	Fired	Michael Malone	Golden State Warriors assistant coach (2011–2013)	
June 10	Detroit Pistons	Lawrence Frank	Fired	Maurice Cheeks	Oklahoma City Thunder assistant coach (2009–2013)	
June 12	Brooklyn Nets	P. J. Carlesimo	Interim coach, contract not renewed	Jason Kidd	None; New York Knicks guard (2012–2013)	
June 25	Los Angeles Clippers	Vinny Del Negro	Contract not renewed	Doc Rivers	Boston Celtics head coach (2004–2013)	
June 25	Denver Nuggets	George Karl	Fired	Brian Shaw	Indiana Pacers assistant coach (2011–2013)	
June 27	Memphis Grizzlies	Lionel Hollins	Contract not renewed	Dave Joerger	Memphis Grizzlies assistant coach (2007–2013)	
July 3	Boston Celtics	Doc Rivers	Traded	Brad Stevens	Butler Bulldogs head coach (2007–2013)	
August 14	Philadelphia 76ers	Doug Collins	Resigned	Brett Brown	San Antonio Spurs assistant coach (2007–2013)	

Season

Date	Team	Outgoing head coach	Reason for departure	Incoming head coach	Last coaching position	Ref.
February 9	Detroit Pistons	Maurice Cheeks	Fired	John Loyer (interim)	Detroit Pistons assistant coach (2011–2014)	

=== General manager changes ===
Off-season

Hire date	Team	Outgoing general manager	Reason for departure	Incoming general manager	Last managerial position	Ref.
May 3	Minnesota Timberwolves	David Kahn	Contract not renewed	Flip Saunders	Boston Celtics advisor (2012–2013)	
May 7	Phoenix Suns	Lance Blanks	Fired	Ryan McDonough	Boston Celtics assistant general manager (2010–2013)	
May 31	Toronto Raptors	Bryan Colangelo	Contract not renewed; continued as team president	Masai Ujiri	Denver Nuggets general manager (2010–2013)	
June 17	Sacramento Kings	Geoff Petrie	Contract not renewed	Pete D'Alessandro	Denver Nuggets vice president of basketball operations (2012–2013)	
June 17	Denver Nuggets	Masai Ujiri	Expiring contract, signed with Toronto	Tim Connelly	New Orleans Hornets assistant general manager (2010–2013)	

Season

Hire date	Team	Outgoing general manager	Reason for departure	Incoming general manager	Last managerial position	Ref.
February 6	Cleveland Cavaliers	Chris Grant	Fired	David Griffin	Cleveland Cavaliers vice president of basketball operations (2010–2014)	

=== Team president changes ===
Season

Hire date	Team	Outgoing member	Reason for departure	Incoming member	Last position	Ref.
March 18	New York Knicks	Steve Mills	Replaced	Phil Jackson	Los Angeles Lakers head coach (2005–11)	

== Player movement ==
The following is a list of player/coach movement via free agency and trades.

=== Trades ===
June
June 25	To Boston Celtics: 2015 first-round draft pick	To Los Angeles Clippers: Rights to hire Doc Rivers as head coach
June 27 (Draft-day trades)	To Utah Jazz: Draft rights to 9th pick Trey Burke	To Minnesota Timberwolves: Draft rights to 14th pick Shabazz Muhammad; Draft rights to 21st pick Gorgui Dieng
June 27 (Draft-day trades)	To Minnesota Timberwolves: 2014 second-round draft pick; Cash considerations	To Golden State Warriors: Draft rights to 26th pick André Roberson; Malcolm Lee
June 27 (Draft-day trades)	To Oklahoma City Thunder: Draft rights to 26th pick André Roberson	To Golden State Warriors: Draft rights to 29th pick Archie Goodwin; Cash considerations
June 27 (Draft-day trades)	To Portland Trail Blazers: Draft rights to 31st pick Allen Crabbe	To Cleveland Cavaliers: 2015 Portland second-round pick; 2016 Portland second-round pick
June 27 (Draft-day trades)	To Boston Celtics: Draft rights to 13th pick Kelly Olynyk	To Dallas Mavericks: Draft rights to 16th pick Lucas Nogueira; Two 2014 second-round draft picks
June 27 (Draft-day trades)	To Dallas Mavericks: Draft rights to 18th pick Shane Larkin; Cash considerations	To Atlanta Hawks: Jared Cunningham; Draft rights to 16th pick Lucas Nogueira; Draft rights to 44th pick Mike Muscala
June 27 (Draft-day trades)	To Utah Jazz: Draft rights to 27th pick Rudy Gobert	To Denver Nuggets: Draft rights to 46th pick Erick Green; Cash considerations
June 27 (Draft-day trades)	To Golden State Warriors: Draft rights to 30th pick Nemanja Nedović	To Phoenix Suns: Draft rights to 29th pick Archie Goodwin; Malcolm Lee
June 27 (Draft-day trades)	To Denver Nuggets: Darrell Arthur; Draft rights to 55th pick Joffrey Lauvergne	To Memphis Grizzlies: Kosta Koufos
June 27 (Draft-day trades)	To Boston Celtics: Draft rights to 53rd pick Colton Iverson	To Indiana Pacers: Cash considerations
June 27 (Draft-day trades)	To Washington Wizards: Draft rights to 35th pick Glen Rice Jr.	To Philadelphia 76ers: Draft rights to 38th pick Nate Wolters; Draft rights to 54th pick Arsalan Kazemi
June 27 (Draft-day trades)	To Portland Trail Blazers: Cash considerations	To Oklahoma City Thunder: Draft rights to 40th pick Grant Jerrett
June 27 (Draft-day trades)	To Miami Heat: Draft rights to 50th pick James Ennis	To Atlanta Hawks: Future second-round draft pick
June 27 (Draft-day trades)	To Utah Jazz: Draft rights to 47th pick Raul Neto	To Atlanta Hawks: 2015 Brooklyn second-round draft pick
June 28	To Philadelphia 76ers: Draft rights to 43rd pick Ricky Ledo; 2014 second-round draft pick	To Milwaukee Bucks: Draft rights to 38th pick Nate Wolters
June 28	To Philadelphia 76ers: Future second-round draft pick	To Dallas Mavericks: Draft rights to 43rd pick Ricky Ledo
July
July 10	To New York Knicks: Andrea Bargnani	To Toronto Raptors: Marcus Camby; Steve Novak; Quentin Richardson (sign and trade); 2014 second-round draft pick; 2016 first-round draft pick; 2017 second-round draft pick
July 10	To Portland Trail Blazers: Thomas Robinson	To Houston Rockets: Draft rights to 45th pick Marko Todorović; Draft rights to 2012 48th pick Kostas Papanikolaou; 2 future second-round draft picks
July 10	Three-team trade	
July 10	To Los Angeles Clippers: Jared Dudley (from Phoenix); JJ Redick (from Milwaukee) (sign and trade)	To Phoenix Suns: Eric Bledsoe (from L.A. Clippers); Caron Butler (from L.A. Clippers)
July 10	To Milwaukee Bucks: future second-round draft pick (from Toronto or Sacramento via Phoenix); Future second-round draft pick (from L.A. Clippers)	
July 10	Three-team trade	
July 10	To Golden State Warriors: Andre Iguodala (from Denver) (sign and trade); Kevin Murphy (from Utah)	To Utah Jazz: Andris Biedriņš (from Golden State); Richard Jefferson (from Golden State); Brandon Rush (from Golden State); 2014 first-round draft picks (from Golden State); 2016 second-round draft picks (from Golden State); 2017 first-round draft picks (from Golden State); 2017 second-round draft picks (from Golden State); 2018 second-round draft pick (from Denver); Cash considerations (from Golden State)
July 10	To Denver Nuggets: Randy Foye (from Utah) (sign and trade); 2018 second-round draft pick (from Golden State)	
July 10	Three-team trade	
July 10	To New Orleans Pelicans: Tyreke Evans (from Sacramento) (sign and trade); Draft rights to 39th pick Jeff Withey (from Portland)	To Sacramento Kings: Greivis Vásquez (from New Orleans); Two future second-round draft picks (from Portland)
July 10	To Portland Trail Blazers: Robin Lopez (from New Orleans); Terrel Harris (from New Orleans)	
July 11	Three-team trade	
July 11	To Minnesota Timberwolves: Kevin Martin (from Oklahoma City) (sign and trade); Cash considerations (from Oklahoma City)	To Oklahoma City Thunder: Draft rights to 2003 35th pick Szymon Szewczyk
July 11	To Milwaukee Bucks: Luke Ridnour (from Minnesota); 2014 Los Angeles Lakers second-round draft pick (from Minnesota); Cash considerations (from Oklahoma City)	
July 12	To Brooklyn Nets: Kevin Garnett; Paul Pierce; Jason Terry; D. J. White	To Boston Celtics: Gerald Wallace; Kris Humphries; MarShon Brooks; Kris Joseph; Keith Bogans (sign and trade); 2014 first-round pick; 2016 first-round pick; 2018 first-round pick; Right to swap first-round draft picks in 2017
July 12	To Philadelphia 76ers: Draft rights to 6th pick Nerlens Noel; 2014 first-round draft pick	To New Orleans Pelicans: Jrue Holiday; Draft rights to 42nd pick Pierre Jackson
July 13	To Sacramento Kings: Luc Mbah a Moute	To Milwaukee Bucks: 2016 second-round pick (Note: Milwaukee will receive the more favorable of the New Orleans and Sacramento picks.); Future considerations
July 13	To Philadelphia 76ers: Royce White; Rights to Furkan Aldemir; Additional consideration	To Houston Rockets: Future draft considerations
July 22	To Memphis Grizzlies: Rights to Nick Calathes	To Dallas Mavericks: Removal of protection on 2016 Memphis second-round draft pick
July 27	To Phoenix Suns: Gerald Green; Miles Plumlee; 2014 lottery-protected first-round draft pick	To Indiana Pacers: Luis Scola
July 31	To Detroit Pistons: Brandon Jennings (sign and trade)	To Milwaukee Bucks: Brandon Knight; Khris Middleton; Viacheslav Kravtsov
August
August 15	To Boston Celtics: Donté Greene	To Memphis Grizzlies: Fab Melo; Cash considerations
August 22	To Philadelphia 76ers: Tony Wroten	To Memphis Grizzlies: future draft considerations; Trade exception
August 29	To Milwaukee Bucks: Caron Butler	To Phoenix Suns: Viacheslav Kravtsov; Ish Smith
October
October 25	To Phoenix Suns: Emeka Okafor; 2014 protected first-round draft pick (Note: Protected #1–12)	To Washington Wizards: Marcin Gortat; Kendall Marshall; Shannon Brown; Malcolm Lee
November
November 26	To Minnesota Timberwolves: Luc Mbah a Moute	To Sacramento Kings: Derrick Williams
December
December 9	To Sacramento Kings: Rudy Gay; Aaron Gray; Quincy Acy	To Toronto Raptors: Greivis Vásquez; John Salmons; Patrick Patterson; Chuck Hayes
January
January 7	To Chicago Bulls: Andrew Bynum; future Sacramento protected first-round pick (Note: The Sacramento pick is No. 1–12 in 2014, #1–10 in 2015–2017, and converts to a second-round pick (protected #56–60) if not conveyed by 2017.); 2015 Portland second-round pick; 2016 Portland second-round pick; Right to swap 2015 first-round picks if Cleveland not in lottery	To Cleveland Cavaliers: Luol Deng
January 7	Three-team trade	
January 7	To Boston Celtics: Jerryd Bayless (from Memphis); Ryan Gomes (from Oklahoma City)	To Memphis Grizzlies: Courtney Lee (from Boston); 2016 second-round pick (from Boston); Cash considerations (from Oklahoma City)
January 7	To Oklahoma City Thunder: 2014 Philadelphia second-round pick (from Memphis); Conditional 2017 second-round pick (from Memphis)	
January 15
January 15	Three-team trade	
January 15	To Boston Celtics: Joel Anthony (from Miami); 2016 Miami second-round pick; Conditional future Philadelphia first-round pick (from Miami)	To Miami Heat: Toney Douglas (from Golden State)
January 15	To Golden State Warriors: Jordan Crawford (from Boston); MarShon Brooks (from Boston)	
January 21	To Chicago Bulls: Tornike Shengelia	To Brooklyn Nets: Marquis Teague
January 21	To Brooklyn Nets: Draft rights to Edin Bavčić	To New Orleans Pelicans: Tyshawn Taylor; Cash considerations
February
February 19	To Brooklyn Nets: Marcus Thornton	To Sacramento Kings: Reggie Evans; Jason Terry
February 19	To Los Angeles Lakers: MarShon Brooks; Kent Bazemore	To Golden State Warriors: Steve Blake
February 20
February 20	Three-team trade	
February 20	To Washington Wizards: Andre Miller (from Denver); Protected 2014 second-round pick (from Philadelphia)	To Denver Nuggets: Jan Veselý (from Washington)
February 20	To Philadelphia 76ers: Eric Maynor (from Washington); 2015 second-round pick (from Washington); Future second-round pick (from Denver)	
February 20	To Philadelphia 76ers: 2014 Cleveland second-round pick; 2014 Memphis second-round pick (via Memphis); Earl Clark; Henry Sims	To Cleveland Cavaliers: Spencer Hawes
February 20	To Charlotte Bobcats: Gary Neal; Luke Ridnour	To Milwaukee Bucks: Ramon Sessions; Jeff Adrien
February 20	To Sacramento Kings: Roger Mason Jr.; Cash consideration	To Miami Heat: Conditional 2015 second-round pick
February 20	To Denver Nuggets: Aaron Brooks	To Houston Rockets: Jordan Hamilton
February 20	To San Antonio Spurs: Austin Daye	To Toronto Raptors: Nando de Colo
February 20	To Indiana Pacers: Evan Turner; Lavoy Allen	To Philadelphia 76ers: Danny Granger; 2015 Golden State second-round pick
February 20	To Los Angeles Clippers: Future second-round pick	To Philadelphia 76ers: Byron Mullens; Conditional second-round pick
February 20	To Los Angeles Clippers: Draft rights to Cenk Akyol	To Atlanta Hawks: Antawn Jamison

=== Free agency ===
Free agency negotiation starts on July 1, 2013, with players being able to sign starting July 10, after the July moratorium ends. The following players, who last played for an NBA team in 2012–13, are scheduled to become free agents. All players will be unrestricted free agents unless indicated otherwise. A restricted free agent's team has the right to keep the player by matching an offer sheet the player signs with another team.

Player	Date signed	New team	Former team	Ref
Donald Sloan	July 3	Indiana Pacers	Guangdong Southern Tigers (China)	
Al-Farouq Aminu	July 10	New Orleans Pelicans		
Chris Andersen	July 10	Miami Heat		
Matt Barnes	July 10	Los Angeles Clippers		
Darren Collison	July 10	Los Angeles Clippers	Dallas Mavericks	
Mike Dunleavy Jr.	July 10	Chicago Bulls	Milwaukee Bucks	
Tyreke Evans (RFA)	July 10	New Orleans Pelicans (via sign and trade)	Sacramento Kings	
Randy Foye	July 10	Denver Nuggets (via sign and trade)	Utah Jazz	
Ryan Hollins	July 10	Los Angeles Clippers		
Andre Iguodala***	July 10	Golden State Warriors (via sign and trade)	Denver Nuggets	
Al Jefferson	July 10	Charlotte Bobcats	Utah Jazz	
Eric Maynor	July 10	Washington Wizards	Portland Trail Blazers	
Paul Millsap	July 10	Atlanta Hawks	Utah Jazz	
Chris Paul	July 10	Los Angeles Clippers		
Pablo Prigioni (RFA)	July 10	New York Knicks		
JJ Redick	July 10	Los Angeles Clippers (via sign and trade)	Milwaukee Bucks	
Quentin Richardson	July 10	Toronto Raptors (via sign and trade)	New York Knicks	
Robert Sacre (RFA)	July 10	Los Angeles Lakers		
Josh Smith	July 10	Detroit Pistons	Atlanta Hawks	
Greg Stiemsma	July 10	New Orleans Pelicans	Minnesota Timberwolves (waived on July 7)	
Garrett Temple	July 10	Washington Wizards		
C. J. Watson*	July 10	Indiana Pacers	Brooklyn Nets	
Earl Watson	July 10	Portland Trail Blazers	Utah Jazz	
Martell Webster	July 10	Washington Wizards		
David West	July 10	Indiana Pacers		
Dorell Wright	July 10	Portland Trail Blazers	Philadelphia 76ers	
Jeff Ayres	July 11	San Antonio Spurs	Indiana Pacers	
Marco Belinelli	July 11	San Antonio Spurs	Chicago Bulls	
Andray Blatche	July 11	Brooklyn Nets		
José Calderón	July 11	Dallas Mavericks	Detroit Pistons	
Manu Ginóbili	July 11	San Antonio Spurs		
J. J. Hickson	July 11	Denver Nuggets	Portland Trail Blazers	
Shaun Livingston	July 11	Brooklyn Nets	Cleveland Cavaliers	
Kevin Martin	July 11	Minnesota Timberwolves (via sign and trade)	Oklahoma City Thunder	
Gal Mekel	July 11	Dallas Mavericks	Maccabi Haifa (Israel)	
Nazr Mohammed	July 11	Chicago Bulls		
J. R. Smith*	July 11	New York Knicks		
Nick Young	July 11	Los Angeles Lakers	Philadelphia 76ers	
Keith Bogans	July 12	Boston Celtics (via sign and trade)	Brooklyn Nets	
Corey Brewer	July 12	Minnesota Timberwolves	Denver Nuggets	
Chase Budinger	July 12	Minnesota Timberwolves		
Earl Clark	July 12	Cleveland Cavaliers	Los Angeles Lakers	
Jarrett Jack	July 12	Cleveland Cavaliers	Golden State Warriors	
Chris Kaman	July 12	Los Angeles Lakers	Dallas Mavericks	
Andrei Kirilenko*	July 12	Brooklyn Nets	Minnesota Timberwolves	
Kyle Korver	July 12	Atlanta Hawks		
Josh McRoberts	July 12	Charlotte Bobcats		
Marreese Speights*	July 12	Golden State Warriors	Cleveland Cavaliers	
Dwight Howard	July 13	Houston Rockets	Los Angeles Lakers	
O. J. Mayo*	July 13	Milwaukee Bucks	Dallas Mavericks	
Tiago Splitter (RFA)	July 13	San Antonio Spurs		
Jeff Teague (RFA)	July 13	Atlanta Hawks (matched offer sheet from Milwaukee)		
Chris Copeland (RFA)	July 14	Indiana Pacers	New York Knicks	
Tony Allen	July 15	Memphis Grizzlies		
Elton Brand	July 15	Atlanta Hawks	Dallas Mavericks	
Robert Covington	July 15	Houston Rockets	Tennessee St. (went undrafted in the 2013 draft)	
Tyler Hansbrough	July 15	Toronto Raptors	Indiana Pacers	
Wesley Johnson	July 15	Los Angeles Lakers	Phoenix Suns	
Carl Landry*	July 15	Sacramento Kings	Golden State Warriors	
Jon Leuer	July 15	Memphis Grizzlies		
B. J. Young	July 15	Houston Rockets	Arkansas (went undrafted in the 2013 draft)	
James Anderson	July 16	Philadelphia 76ers (claimed off waivers)	Houston Rockets (waived on July 15)	
Chauncey Billups	July 16	Detroit Pistons	Los Angeles Clippers	
Dwight Buycks	July 16	Toronto Raptors	BCM Gravelines (France)	
Will Bynum	July 16	Detroit Pistons		
Omri Casspi	July 16	Houston Rockets	Cleveland Cavaliers	
Luigi Datome	July 16	Detroit Pistons	Virtus Roma (Italy)	
Tim Ohlbrecht	July 16	Philadelphia 76ers (claimed off waivers)	Houston Rockets (waived on July 15)	
Metta World Peace	July 16	New York Knicks	Los Angeles Lakers (waived on July 11)	
Carlos Delfino	July 17	Milwaukee Bucks	Houston Rockets (waived on June 30)	
Jordan Farmar	July 17	Los Angeles Lakers	Anadolu Efes S.K. (Turkey)	
Zaza Pachulia	July 17	Milwaukee Bucks	Atlanta Hawks	
Toney Douglas	July 18	Golden State Warriors	Sacramento Kings	
Jason Maxiell	July 18	Orlando Magic	Detroit Pistons	
Anthony Morrow	July 18	New Orleans Pelicans	Dallas Mavericks	
Ronny Turiaf	July 18	Minnesota Timberwolves	Los Angeles Clippers	
Aaron Brooks	July 19	Houston Rockets (previously waived on June 30)		
Andrew Bynum	July 19	Cleveland Cavaliers	Philadelphia 76ers	
Samuel Dalembert	July 19	Dallas Mavericks	Milwaukee Bucks	
Reggie Williams	July 19	Houston Rockets	Charlotte Bobcats	
D. J. Augustin	July 22	Toronto Raptors	Indiana Pacers	
Vítor Faverani	July 22	Boston Celtics	Valencia BC (Spain)	
John Lucas III**	July 22	Utah Jazz	Toronto Raptors	
Byron Mullens	July 22	Los Angeles Clippers	Charlotte Bobcats	
Phil Pressey	July 22	Boston Celtics	Missouri (went undrafted in the 2013 draft)	
Monta Ellis***	July 23	Dallas Mavericks	Milwaukee Bucks	
Jermaine O'Neal	July 23	Golden State Warriors	Phoenix Suns	
Josh Akognon	July 24	Memphis Grizzlies (claimed off waivers)	Dallas Mavericks (waived on July 21)	
Derek Fisher	July 24	Oklahoma City Thunder		
Pero Antić	July 25	Atlanta Hawks	Olympiacos B.C. (Greece)	
Kenyon Martin	July 25	New York Knicks		
Ronnie Price	July 25	Orlando Magic	Portland Trail Blazers	
Brandan Wright	July 25	Dallas Mavericks		
Wayne Ellington	July 26	Dallas Mavericks	Cleveland Cavaliers	
Bernard James	July 26	Dallas Mavericks (previously waived on July 19)		
Miroslav Raduljica	July 26	Milwaukee Bucks	BC Azovmash (Ukraine)	
Nate Robinson	July 26	Denver Nuggets	Chicago Bulls	
Timofey Mozgov (RFA)	July 27	Denver Nuggets		
Gustavo Ayón	July 29	Atlanta Hawks (claimed off waivers)	Milwaukee Bucks (waived on July 25)	
Marcus Camby	July 29	Houston Rockets	Toronto Raptors (waived on July 17)	
Ian Clark	July 29	Utah Jazz	Belmont (went undrafted in the 2013 draft)	
Alan Anderson	July 30	Brooklyn Nets	Toronto Raptors	
Gerald Henderson Jr. (RFA)	July 30	Charlotte Bobcats		
Mike Miller	July 30	Memphis Grizzlies	Miami Heat (waived on July 16)	
Gary Neal	July 30	Milwaukee Bucks	San Antonio Spurs	
Devin Harris	July 31	Dallas Mavericks	Atlanta Hawks	
Brandon Jennings (RFA)	July 31	Detroit Pistons (via sign and trade)	Milwaukee Bucks	
Austin Daye	August 1	Toronto Raptors	Memphis Grizzlies	
DeMarre Carroll	August 3	Atlanta Hawks	Utah Jazz	
Francisco García**	August 5	Houston Rockets		
Jordan Henriquez	August 5	Houston Rockets	Kansas State (went undrafted in the 2013 draft)	
Jeremy Tyler	August 6	New York Knicks	Santa Cruz Warriors (D-League)	
DeJuan Blair	August 7	Dallas Mavericks	San Antonio Spurs	
Ryan Gomes	August 7	Oklahoma City Thunder	Artland Dragons (Germany)	
Greg Oden	August 7	Miami Heat	Portland Trail Blazers	
Beno Udrih	August 8	New York Knicks	Orlando Magic	
Mo Williams	August 8	Portland Trail Blazers	Utah Jazz	
Jannero Pargo	August 9	Charlotte Bobcats		
Al Harrington	August 14	Washington Wizards	Orlando Magic (waived on August 2)	
Elias Harris	August 14	Los Angeles Lakers	Gonzaga (went undrafted in the 2013 draft)	
Nikola Peković (RFA)	August 14	Minnesota Timberwolves		
Dee Bost	August 19	Portland Trail Blazers	Budućnost Podgorica (Montenegro)	
Anthony Tolliver	August 19	Charlotte Bobcats	Atlanta Hawks	
Nick Calathes	August 20	Memphis Grizzlies	Lokomotiv-Kuban (Russia)	
Josh Harrellson	August 21	Detroit Pistons	Chongqing Fly Dragon (China)	
Arinze Onuaku	August 22	New Orleans Pelicans	Canton Charge (D-League)	
Lance Thomas	August 22	New Orleans Pelicans (previously waived on July 10)		
Seth Curry	August 23	Golden State Warriors	Duke (went undrafted in the 2013 draft)	
Ronnie Brewer	August 28	Houston Rockets	Oklahoma City Thunder	
Antawn Jamison	August 28	Los Angeles Clippers	Los Angeles Lakers	
Trent Lockett	August 28	Sacramento Kings	Marquette (went undrafted in the 2013 draft)	
Shawne Williams	September 3	Los Angeles Lakers	Guangzhou Liu Sui (China)	
E. J. Singler	September 4	Portland Trail Blazers	Oregon (went undrafted in the 2013 draft)	
Brandon Davies	September 5	Los Angeles Clippers	BYU (went undrafted in the 2013 draft)	
Xavier Henry	September 5	Los Angeles Lakers	New Orleans Pelicans	
James Southerland	September 5	Charlotte Bobcats	Syracuse (went undrafted in the 2013 draft)	
Eric Griffin	September 10	Miami Heat	Aurora Basket Jesi (Italy)	
Justin Hamilton	September 10	Miami Heat	BK VEF Rīga (Latvia)	
Ron Howard	September 10	Indiana Pacers	Fort Wayne Mad Ants (D-League)	
Darnell Jackson	September 10	Indiana Pacers	Reno Bighorns (D-League)	
D. J. Kennedy	September 10	Dallas Mavericks	Rio Grande Valley Vipers (D-League)	
Mickey McConnell	September 10	Dallas Mavericks	Scaligera Basket Verona (Italy)	
Fab Melo	September 10	Dallas Mavericks	Memphis Grizzlies (waived on August 30)	
Michael Beasley	September 11	Miami Heat	Phoenix Suns (waived on September 3)	
Toure' Murry	September 11	New York Knicks	Rio Grande Valley Vipers (D-League)	
Chris Smith	September 11	New York Knicks (previously waived on October 26, 2012)		
Dionte Christmas	September 13	Phoenix Suns	Montepaschi Siena (Italy)	
Devin Ebanks	September 13	Dallas Mavericks	Los Angeles Lakers	
Richard Howell	September 13	Portland Trail Blazers	North Carolina State (went undrafted in the 2013 draft)	
Marcus Landry	September 16	Los Angeles Lakers	Reno Bighorns (D-League)	
Carlos Morais	September 19	Toronto Raptors	Atlético Petróleos de Luanda (Angola)	
Julyan Stone	September 19	Toronto Raptors	Denver Nuggets	
Chris Wright	September 19	Toronto Raptors	Maine Red Claws (D-League)	
Dewayne Dedmon	September 23	Golden State Warriors	USC (went undrafted in the 2013 draft)	
Larry Drew II	September 23	Miami Heat	UCLA (went undrafted in the 2013 draft)	
Cameron Jones	September 23	Golden State Warriors	Santa Cruz Warriors (D-League)	
Cole Aldrich	September 24	New York Knicks	Sacramento Kings	
Eric Boateng	September 25	Los Angeles Lakers	Phantoms Braunschweig (Germany)	
Darius Johnson-Odom	September 25	Los Angeles Lakers	BC Spartak Saint Petersburg (Russia)	
Mike Harris	September 26	Utah Jazz	Leones de Ponce (Puerto Rico)	
Othyus Jeffers	September 26	Minnesota Timberwolves	Iowa Energy (D-League)	
Scott Machado	September 26	Utah Jazz	Golden State Warriors (waived on July 24)	
Dominic McGuire	September 26	Utah Jazz	Indiana Pacers	
Joe Alexander	September 27	Golden State Warriors	BC Krasnye Krylia (Russia)	
Hilton Armstrong	September 27	Indiana Pacers	Santa Cruz Warriors (D-League)	
Vander Blue	September 27	Philadelphia 76ers	Marquette (went undrafted in the 2013 draft)	
Rasual Butler	September 27	Indiana Pacers	Tulsa 66ers (D-League)	
Josh Childress	September 27	Washington Wizards	Brooklyn Nets	
Patrick Christopher	September 27	Chicago Bulls	Beşiktaş (Turkey)	
Ike Diogu	September 27	New York Knicks	Leones de Ponce (Puerto Rico)	
D'or Fischer	September 27	Washington Wizards	BC Donetsk (Ukraine)	
Dan Gadzuric	September 27	Los Angeles Lakers	Marinos de Anzoátegui (Venezuela)	
Diante Garrett	September 27	Oklahoma City Thunder	Phoenix Suns	
Mickell Gladness	September 27	Orlando Magic	Santa Cruz Warriors (D-League)	
Manny Harris	September 27	Orlando Magic	BC Azovmash (Ukraine)	
Mike James	September 27	Chicago Bulls	Dallas Mavericks	
Dahntay Jones	September 27	Chicago Bulls	Atlanta Hawks	
Solomon Jones	September 27	Orlando Magic	New York Knicks	
Kris Joseph	September 27	Orlando Magic	Boston Celtics (waived on July 15)	
Kalin Lucas	September 27	Chicago Bulls	Banvit B.K. (Turkey)	
Roger Mason Jr.	September 27	Miami Heat	New Orleans Pelicans	
Pops Mensah-Bonsu	September 27	Washington Wizards	Olimpia Milano (Italy)	
Rodney McGruder	September 27	Oklahoma City Thunder	Kansas St. (went undrafted in the 2013 draft)	
Darius Morris	September 27	Philadelphia 76ers	Los Angeles Lakers	
Dexter Pittman	September 27	Chicago Bulls	Memphis Grizzlies	
Xavier Silas	September 27	Washington Wizards	Maine Red Claws (D-League)	
Hollis Thompson	September 27	Philadelphia 76ers	Tulsa 66ers (D-League)	
D. J. White	September 27	Chicago Bulls	Brooklyn Nets (waived on July 18)	
Rodney Williams	September 27	Philadelphia 76ers	Minnesota (went undrafted in the 2013 draft)	
Khalif Wyatt	September 27	Philadelphia 76ers	Temple (went undrafted in the 2013 draft)	
Solomon Alabi	September 28	Philadelphia 76ers	Ikaros Chalkidas B.C. (Greece)	
Mac Koshwal	September 28	Philadelphia 76ers	Rochester Razorsharks (PBL)	
James Nunnally	September 28	Phoenix Suns	Bakersfield Jam (D-League)	
Derrick Byars	September 29	Memphis Grizzlies	Caciques de Humacao (Puerto Rico)	
Melvin Ely	September 29	Memphis Grizzlies	Texas Legends (D-League)	
Tony Gaffney	September 29	Memphis Grizzlies	Joventut Badalona (Spain)	
Brandon Heath	September 29	Sacramento Kings	PBC Lukoil Academic (Bulgaria)	
DeQuan Jones	September 29	Sacramento Kings	Orlando Magic	
Hamady N'Diaye	September 29	Sacramento Kings	Tianjin Ronggang (China)	
Lou Amundson	September 30	Los Angeles Clippers	New Orleans Pelicans	
Chris Babb	September 30	Boston Celtics	Iowa State (went undrafted in the 2013 draft)	
Renaldo Balkman	September 30	Dallas Mavericks	Guayama Wizards (Puerto Rico)	
Reginald Becton	September 30	Denver Nuggets	Mississippi (went undrafted in the 2013 draft)	
Damen Bell-Holter	September 30	Boston Celtics	Oral Roberts (went undrafted in the 2013 draft)	
Justin Brownlee	September 30	New York Knicks	San Diego Surf (ABA)	
Junior Cadougan	September 30	Milwaukee Bucks	Marquette (went undrafted in the 2013 draft)	
Brian Cook	September 30	Utah Jazz	Piratas de Quebradillas (Puerto Rico)	
Marcus Cousin	September 30	San Antonio Spurs	Kyoto Hannaryz (Japan)	
Olek Czyz	September 30	Milwaukee Bucks	Pallacanestro Virtus Roma (Italy)	
Troy Daniels	September 30	Charlotte Bobcats	VCU (went undrafted in the 2013 draft)	
Eric Dawson	September 30	Atlanta Hawks	Metros de Santiago (Dominican Republic)	
Matthew Dellavedova	September 30	Cleveland Cavaliers	Saint Mary's (went undrafted in the 2013 draft)	
DeSagana Diop	September 30	Cleveland Cavaliers	Charlotte Bobcats	
Mustapha Farrakhan	September 30	Los Angeles Clippers	Tulsa 66ers (D-League)	
Courtney Fells	September 30	San Antonio Spurs	Talk 'N Text Tropang Texters (Philippines)	
Kyle Fogg	September 30	Denver Nuggets	Rio Grande Valley Vipers (D-League)	
Gary Forbes	September 30	Brooklyn Nets	Zhejiang Lions (China)	
Abdul Gaddy	September 30	Charlotte Bobcats	Washington (went undrafted in the 2013 draft)	
Stephen Graham	September 30	Milwaukee Bucks	Capitanes de Arecibo (Puerto Rico)	
JaMychal Green	September 30	Los Angeles Clippers	Austin Toros (D-League)	
Jorge Gutierrez	September 30	Brooklyn Nets	Canton Charge (D-League)	
Lazar Hayward	September 30	New Orleans Pelicans	Los Angeles D-Fenders (D-League)	
Justin Holiday	September 30	Utah Jazz	Philadelphia 76ers (waived on August 14)	
Royal Ivey	September 30	Atlanta Hawks	Philadelphia 76ers	
Damion James	September 30	Denver Nuggets	Bakersfield Jam (D-League)	
Marko Jarić	September 30	Brooklyn Nets	Chicago Bulls (waived on October 24, 2012)	
Chris Johnson	September 30	Brooklyn Nets	Rio Grande Valley Vipers (D-League)	
James Johnson	September 30	Atlanta Hawks	Sacramento Kings	
Dwayne Jones	September 30	Utah Jazz	Golden State Warriors (waived on July 24)	
Myck Kabongo	September 30	San Antonio Spurs	Texas (went undrafted in the 2013 draft)	
Kenny Kadji	September 30	Cleveland Cavaliers	Miami (went undrafted in the 2013 draft)	
Michael Lee	September 30	Cleveland Cavaliers	BC Politekhnika-Halychyna (Ukraine)	
David Lighty	September 30	Atlanta Hawks	JSF Nanterre (France)	
Corey Maggette	September 30	San Antonio Spurs	Detroit Pistons	
Trey McKinney-Jones	September 30	Milwaukee Bucks	Miami (went undrafted in the 2013 draft)	
Dan Nwaelele	September 30	San Antonio Spurs	Santa Cruz Warriors (D-League)	
Patrick O'Bryant	September 30	Charlotte Bobcats	BC Lietuvos rytas (Lithuania)	
Josh Powell	September 30	New York Knicks	Olympiacos B.C. (Greece)	
A. J. Price	September 30	Minnesota Timberwolves	Washington Wizards	
DeShawn Sims	September 30	Boston Celtics	Hekmeh BC (Lebanon)	
Henry Sims	September 30	Cleveland Cavaliers	Petron Blaze Boosters (Philippines)	
Jermaine Taylor	September 30	Cleveland Cavaliers	Maine Red Claws (D-League)	
Kammron Taylor	September 30	Boston Celtics	MHP Riesen Ludwigsburg (Germany)	
Adonis Thomas	September 30	Atlanta Hawks	Memphis (went undrafted in the 2013 draft)	
Charlie Westbrook	September 30	Miami Heat	Scaligera Basket Verona (Italy)	
Damien Wilkins	September 30	Atlanta Hawks	Philadelphia 76ers	
Elliot Williams	September 30	Cleveland Cavaliers	Portland Trail Blazers	
Sam Young	September 30	San Antonio Spurs	Indiana Pacers	
Rodney Carney	October 1	New Orleans Pelicans	Antalya BB (Turkey)	
Lester Hudson	October 1	Utah Jazz	Austin Toros (D-League)	
Chris Douglas-Roberts	October 2	New York Knicks	Dallas Mavericks	
Gani Lawal	October 5	Philadelphia 76ers	VEF Rīga (Latvia)	
Andre Barrett	October 10	Memphis Grizzlies	Sioux Falls Skyforce (D-League)	
Cartier Martin	October 15	Atlanta Hawks	Washington Wizards	
Daniel Orton	October 16	Philadelphia 76ers	Oklahoma City Thunder (waived on October 10)	
Troy Daniels	October 18	Houston Rockets	Charlotte Bobcats (waived on October 10)	
Adonis Thomas	October 18	Brooklyn Nets	Atlanta Hawks (waived on October 14)	
Josh Howard	October 25	San Antonio Spurs	Minnesota Timberwolves	
Jamaal Tinsley	October 26	Utah Jazz		
Brandon Davies	October 28	Philadelphia 76ers	Los Angeles Clippers (waived on October 21)	
Lou Amundson	November 12	New Orleans Pelicans	Los Angeles Clippers (waived on October 26)	
Josh Childress	November 12	New Orleans Pelicans	Washington Wizards (waived on October 24)	
Diante Garrett	November 13	Utah Jazz	Iowa Energy (D-League)	
Dewayne Dedmon	November 18	Golden State Warriors	Santa Cruz Warriors (D-League)	
Lorenzo Brown	November 20	Philadelphia 76ers	Springfield Armor (D-League)	
Elliot Williams	November 20	Philadelphia 76ers	Cleveland Cavaliers (waived on October 25)	
Malcolm Thomas	December 3	San Antonio Spurs	Los Angeles D-Fenders (D-League)	
Stephen Jackson	December 10	Los Angeles Clippers	San Antonio Spurs	
Hilton Armstrong	December 11	Golden State Warriors	Santa Cruz Warriors (D-League)	
Chris Douglas-Roberts	December 11	Charlotte Bobcats	Texas Legends (D-League)	
D. J. Augustin	December 13	Chicago Bulls	Toronto Raptors (waived on December 9)	
James Johnson	December 16	Memphis Grizzlies	Rio Grande Valley Vipers (D-League)	
Alexis Ajinça	December 20	New Orleans Pelicans	Strasbourg IG (France)	
Kendall Marshall	December 20	Los Angeles Lakers	Delaware 87ers (D-League)	
Seth Curry	December 24	Memphis Grizzlies	Santa Cruz Warriors (D-League)	
Jeremy Tyler	December 31	New York Knicks	Erie BayHawks (D-League)	
Darius Morris	January 6	Los Angeles Clippers (10-day contract)	Philadelphia 76ers (waived on November 20)	
Leandro Barbosa	January 8	Phoenix Suns (10-day contract)	Esporte Clube Pinheiros (Brazil)	
Maalik Wayns	January 8	Los Angeles Clippers (10-day contract, previously waived on January 5)		
Cartier Martin	January 10	Chicago Bulls (10-day contract)	Atlanta Hawks (waived on January 7)	
James Nunnally	January 11	Atlanta Hawks (10-day contract)	Bakersfield Jam (D-League)	
Dewayne Dedmon	January 14	Philadelphia 76ers (10-day contract)	Santa Cruz Warriors (D-League)	
Manny Harris	January 16	Los Angeles Lakers (10-day contract)	Los Angeles D-Fenders (D-League)	
Royal Ivey	January 16	Oklahoma City Thunder (10-day contract)	Atlanta Hawks (waived on October 25)	
Darius Morris	January 16	Los Angeles Clippers (second 10-day contract)		
Hedo Türkoğlu	January 16	Los Angeles Clippers	Orlando Magic (waived on January 3)	
Chris Johnson	January 17	Boston Celtics (10-day contract)	Rio Grande Valley Vipers (D-League)	
Leandro Barbosa	January 18	Phoenix Suns (second 10-day contract)		
Cartier Martin	January 20	Chicago Bulls (second 10-day contract)		
Vander Blue	January 22	Boston Celtics (10-day contract)	Delaware 87ers (D-League)	
Mike James	January 22	Chicago Bulls (10-day contract, previously waived on December 16)		
James Nunnally	January 22	Atlanta Hawks (second 10-day contract)		
Dewayne Dedmon	January 24	Philadelphia 76ers (second 10-day contract)		
Othyus Jeffers	January 24	San Antonio Spurs (10-day contract)	Iowa Energy (D-League)	
Malcolm Thomas	January 25	Utah Jazz (claimed off waivers)	San Antonio Spurs (waived on January 23)	
Manny Harris	January 26	Los Angeles Lakers (second 10-day contract)		
Leandro Barbosa	January 28	Phoenix Suns (signed for rest of season)		
Chris Johnson	January 28	Boston Celtics (second 10-day contract)		
Shannon Brown	February 1	San Antonio Spurs (10-day contract)	Washington Wizards (waived on October 28)	
Andrew Bynum	February 1	Indiana Pacers	Chicago Bulls (waived on January 7)	
Cartier Martin	February 1	Atlanta Hawks (10-day contract)	Chicago Bulls	
Darius Morris	February 3	Memphis Grizzlies (10-day contract)	Los Angeles Clippers	
Sasha Vujačić	February 3	Los Angeles Clippers (10-day contract)	Anadolu Efes S.K. (Turkey)	
Luke Babbitt	February 4	New Orleans Pelicans	BC Nizhny Novgorod (Russia)	
Shawne Williams	February 6	Los Angeles Lakers (10-day contract)	Los Angeles D-Fenders (D-League)	
Chris Johnson	February 7	Boston Celtics (signed for rest of season)		
Cartier Martin	February 11	Atlanta Hawks (second 10-day contract)		
Shannon Brown	February 12	San Antonio Spurs (second 10-day contract)		
Jarvis Varnado	February 18	Chicago Bulls (10-day contract)	Iowa Energy (D-League)	
Troy Daniels	February 21	Houston Rockets	Rio Grande Valley Vipers (D-League)	
Cartier Martin	February 21	Atlanta Hawks (signed for rest of season)		
Hilton Armstrong	February 22	Golden State Warriors (10-day contract)	Santa Cruz Warriors (D-League)	
Arinze Onuaku	February 22	Cleveland Cavaliers (10-day contract)	Canton Charge (D-League)	
Dexter Pittman	February 22	Atlanta Hawks (10-day contract)	Austin Toros (D-League)	
Jason Collins	February 23	Brooklyn Nets (10-day contract)	Washington Wizards	
Glen Davis	February 24	Los Angeles Clippers	Orlando Magic (waived on February 21)	
Dewayne Dedmon	February 25	Orlando Magic (10-day contract)	Santa Cruz Warriors (D-League)	
DeAndre Liggins	February 25	Miami Heat (10-day contract)	Sioux Falls Skyforce (D-League)	
Adonis Thomas	February 25	Orlando Magic (10-day contract)	Springfield Armor (D-League)	
Drew Gooden	February 26	Washington Wizards (10-day contract)	Milwaukee Bucks (waived on July 16)	
Orlando Johnson	February 26	Sacramento Kings (10-day contract)	Indiana Pacers (waived on February 20)	
Shannon Brown	February 27	New York Knicks (10-day contract)	San Antonio Spurs	
Earl Clark	February 27	New York Knicks (10-day contract)	Philadelphia 76ers (waived on February 21)	
Mike Muscala	February 27	Atlanta Hawks	Obradoiro CAB (Spain)	
Beno Udrih	February 27	Memphis Grizzlies (claimed off waivers)	New York Knicks (waived on February 24)	
Chris Babb	February 28	Boston Celtics (10-day contract)	Maine Red Claws (D-League)	
Danny Granger	February 28	Los Angeles Clippers	Philadelphia 76ers (waived on February 26)	
Caron Butler	March 1	Oklahoma City Thunder	Milwaukee Bucks (waived on February 27)	
Shavlik Randolph	March 1	Phoenix Suns	Foshan Dralions (China)	
Jarvis Varnado	March 1	Philadelphia 76ers (10-day contract)	Chicago Bulls	
Jimmer Fredette	March 2	Chicago Bulls	Sacramento Kings (waived on February 27)	
Justin Hamilton	March 4	Charlotte Bobcats (10-day contract)	Sioux Falls Skyforce (D-League)	
Tony Mitchell	March 4	Milwaukee Bucks (10-day contract)	Fort Wayne Mad Ants (D-League)	
Arinze Onuaku	March 4	Cleveland Cavaliers (second 10-day contract)		
Jason Collins	March 5	Brooklyn Nets (second 10-day contract)		
Jorge Gutierrez	March 6	Brooklyn Nets (10-day contract)	Canton Charge (D-League)	
Royce White	March 6	Sacramento Kings (10-day contract)	Philadelphia 76ers (waived on October 25)	
Reggie Williams	March 6	Oklahoma City Thunder (10-day contract)	Tulsa 66ers (D-League)	
Dewayne Dedmon	March 7	Orlando Magic (second 10-day contract)		
Adonis Thomas	March 7	Orlando Magic (second 10-day contract)		
Drew Gooden	March 8	Washington Wizards (second 10-day contract)		
Orlando Johnson	March 8	Sacramento Kings (second 10-day contract)		
DeAndre Liggins	March 8	Miami Heat (second 10-day contract)		
Shannon Brown	March 10	New York Knicks (second 10-day contract)		
Earl Clark	March 10	New York Knicks (second 10-day contract)		
Chris Babb	March 11	Boston Celtics (second 10-day contract)		
Shane Edwards	March 12	Cleveland Cavaliers (10-day contract)	Canton Charge (D-League)	
Jarvis Varnado	March 12	Philadelphia 76ers (signed for rest of season)		
Justin Hamilton	March 14	Miami Heat	Charlotte Bobcats	
Darius Johnson-Odom	March 14	Philadelphia 76ers (10-day contract)	Springfield Armor (D-League)	
Chris Wright	March 14	Milwaukee Bucks (10-day contract)	Maine Red Claws (D-League)	
Jason Collins	March 15	Brooklyn Nets (signed for rest of season)		
Mustafa Shakur	March 16	Oklahoma City Thunder (10-day contract)	Tulsa 66ers (D-League)	
Dewayne Dedmon	March 17	Orlando Magic (signed for rest of season)		
Jorge Gutierrez	March 17	Brooklyn Nets (second 10-day contract)		
James Nunnally	March 17	Philadelphia 76ers (10-day contract)	Texas Legends (D-League)	
Drew Gooden	March 18	Washington Wizards (signed for rest of season)		
Royce White	March 18	Sacramento Kings (second 10-day contract)		
Shannon Brown	March 20	New York Knicks (signed for rest of season)		
Chris Babb	March 21	Boston Celtics (signed for rest of season)		
Seth Curry	March 21	Cleveland Cavaliers (10-day contract)	Santa Cruz Warriors (D-League)	
D. J. White	March 21	Charlotte Bobcats (10-day contract)	Sichuan Blue Whales (China)	
Casper Ware	March 24	Philadelphia 76ers (10-day contract)	Virtus Pallacanestro Bologna (Italy)	
D. J. Stephens	March 26	Milwaukee Bucks (10-day contract)	Ilysiakos B.C. (Greece)	
James Nunnally	March 27	Philadelphia 76ers (second 10-day contract)		
Jorge Gutierrez	March 28	Brooklyn Nets (signed for rest of season)		
Willie Reed	March 28	Sacramento Kings	Springfield Armor (D-League)	
Reggie Williams	March 28	Oklahoma City Thunder (10-day contract)	Tulsa 66ers (D-League)	
Hilton Armstrong	March 30	Golden State Warriors (10-day contract)	Santa Cruz Warriors (D-League)	
Jared Cunningham	March 31	Sacramento Kings (10-day contract)	Atlanta Hawks (waived on February 22)	
Scotty Hopson	March 31	Cleveland Cavaliers	Anadolu Efes S.K. (Turkey)	
D. J. White	March 31	Charlotte Bobcats (second 10-day contract)		
Damion James	April 3	San Antonio Spurs (10-day contract)	Texas Legends (D-League)	
Casper Ware	April 4	Philadelphia 76ers (second 10-day contract)		
Erik Murphy	April 5	Utah Jazz (claimed off waivers)	Chicago Bulls (waived on April 3)	
Chris Wright	April 5	Milwaukee Bucks (10-day contract)	Maine Red Claws (D-League)	
Ronnie Brewer	April 7	Chicago Bulls	Houston Rockets (waived on February 21)	
Grant Jerrett	April 7	Oklahoma City Thunder	Tulsa 66ers (D-League)	
Adonis Thomas	April 7	Philadelphia 76ers (10-day contract)	Springfield Armor (D-League)	
Othyus Jeffers	April 8	Minnesota Timberwolves	Iowa Energy (D-League)	
Hilton Armstrong	April 9	Golden State Warriors (signed for rest of season)		
Lou Amundson	April 10	Chicago Bulls	New Orleans Pelicans (waived on December 31)	
Jared Cunningham	April 10	Sacramento Kings (signed for rest of season)		
Mike James	April 10	Chicago Bulls (previous 10-day contract expired on February 1)		
Dexter Pittman	April 10	Houston Rockets	Austin Toros (D-League)	
D. J. White	April 10	Charlotte Bobcats (signed for rest of season)		
James Southerland	April 11	New Orleans Pelicans	Los Angeles D-Fenders (D-League)	
Damion James	April 13	San Antonio Spurs (signed for rest of season)		
Melvin Ely	April 14	New Orleans Pelicans	Texas Legends (D-League)	
Greg Smith	April 14	Chicago Bulls	Houston Rockets (waived on April 10)	
Casper Ware	April 15	Philadelphia 76ers (signed for rest of season)		
Chris Wright	April 15	Milwaukee Bucks (signed for rest of season)		
Lamar Odom	April 16	New York Knicks	Laboral Kutxa (Spain)	
Josh Powell	April 16	Houston Rockets	Barangay Ginebra San Miguel (Philippines)	
Earl Barron			New York Knicks	
Marquis Daniels			Milwaukee Bucks	
Keyon Dooling			Memphis Grizzlies	
Daniel Gibson			Cleveland Cavaliers	
Mickaël Piétrus			Toronto Raptors	
Joel Przybilla			Milwaukee Bucks	
Chris Wilcox			Boston Celtics	

* Player option
** Team option
*** Early termination option

=== Going overseas ===
*	Denotes international players who returned to their home country

Player	Date signed	New team	New country	NBA team	NBA contract status	Ref
Jeremy Pargo	June 11	PBC CSKA Moscow	Russia	Philadelphia 76ers	Unrestricted free agent	
Andrew Goudelock	July 26	UNICS Kazan	Russia	Los Angeles Lakers	Unrestricted free agent	
Colton Iverson	July 26	Beşiktaş	Turkey	Boston Celtics	Unsigned draft pick	
Linas Kleiza	July 26	Fenerbahçe Ülker	Turkey	Toronto Raptors	Unrestricted free agent	
Pierre Jackson	July 27	ASVEL Villeurbanne	France	New Orleans Pelicans	Unsigned draft pick	
Erick Green	July 30	Montepaschi Siena	Italy	Denver Nuggets	Unsigned draft pick	
Charles Jenkins	July 30	KK Crvena Zvezda	Serbia	Philadelphia 76ers	Unrestricted free agent	
Mike Muscala	July 31	Blu:sens Monbús	Spain	Atlanta Hawks	Unsigned draft pick	
Alex Oriakhi	July 31	Limoges CSP	France	Phoenix Suns	Unsigned draft pick	
Mickaël Gelabale	July 31	BC Khimki	Russia	Minnesota Timberwolves	Unrestricted free agent	
James Ennis	August 10	Perth Wildcats	Australia	Miami Heat	Unsigned draft pick	
Kevin Murphy	August 11	Strasbourg IG	France	Utah Jazz	Unrestricted free agent	
Deshaun Thomas	August 16	JSF Nanterre	France	San Antonio Spurs	Unsigned draft pick	
Ben Hansbrough	August 22	CB Gran Canaria	Spain	Indiana Pacers	Unrestricted free agent	
Johan Petro	August 23	Zhejiang Lions	China	Atlanta Hawks	Unrestricted free agent	
Luke Babbitt	August 29	BC Nizhny Novgorod	Russia	Portland Trail Blazers	Unrestricted free agent	
Ivan Johnson	August 29	Zhejiang Golden Bulls	China	Atlanta Hawks	Unrestricted free agent	
Justin Dentmon	August 30	BC Žalgiris	Lithuania	Dallas Mavericks	Unrestricted free agent	
Arsalan Kazemi*	September 12	Petrochimi Bandar Imam	Iran	Philadelphia 76ers	Unsigned draft pick	
Hamed Haddadi*	September 14	Foolad Mahan Isfahan	Iran	Phoenix Suns	Unrestricted free agent	
James White	September 19	Pallacanestro Reggiana	Italy	New York Knicks	Unrestricted free agent	
Shavlik Randolph	October 2	Foshan Long Lions	China	Boston Celtics	Unrestricted free agent	
Sebastian Telfair	October 15	Tianjin Ronggang	China	Toronto Raptors	Unrestricted free agent	
Josh Akognon	November 15	Qingdao Eagles	China	Dallas Mavericks	Unrestricted free agent	
Sam Young	November 18	Sydney Kings	Australia	Indiana Pacers	Unrestricted free agent	
Leandro Barbosa*	November 19	Esporte Clube Pinheiros	Brazil	Washington Wizards	Unrestricted free agent	
Elias Harris*	December 13	Brose Baskets	Germany	Los Angeles Lakers	Unrestricted free agent	
Hakim Warrick	December 16	Liaoning Flying Leopards	China	Charlotte Bobcats	Unrestricted free agent	
Royal Ivey	January 29	Guangdong Southern Tigers	China	Oklahoma City Thunder	Unrestricted free agent	
Sasha Pavlović*	February 10	KK Partizan	Serbia	Portland Trail Blazers	Unrestricted free agent	
Lamar Odom	February 18	Laboral Kutxa	Spain	Los Angeles Clippers	Unrestricted free agent	
Manny Harris	March 13	Türk Telekom Ankara	Turkey	Los Angeles Lakers	Unrestricted free agent	
Sasha Vujačić	March 25	Reyer Venezia Mestre	Italy	Los Angeles Clippers	Unrestricted free agent	
Rodrigue Beaubois	March 26	Spirou Charleroi	Belgium	Dallas Mavericks	Unrestricted free agent	
Dexter Pittman	April 19	Caciques de Humacao	Puerto Rico	Houston Rockets	Unrestricted free agent	

=== Released ===
==== Waived ====
Player	Date waived	Former team	Ref
Chris Duhon	June 29	Los Angeles Lakers	
Hamed Haddadi	June 29	Phoenix Suns	
Terrence Williams	June 30	Boston Celtics	
Carlos Delfino	June 30	Houston Rockets	
Aaron Brooks	June 30	Houston Rockets	
James White	June 30	New York Knicks	
Sasha Pavlović	July 6	Portland Trail Blazers	
Greg Stiemsma	July 7	Minnesota Timberwolves	
Mickaël Gelabale	July 7	Minnesota Timberwolves	
DaJuan Summers	July 9	Los Angeles Clippers	
Tyrus Thomas*	July 10	Charlotte Bobcats	
Lance Thomas	July 10	New Orleans Pelicans	
Richard Hamilton	July 10	Chicago Bulls	
Metta World Peace*	July 11	Los Angeles Lakers	
Kim English	July 11	Detroit Pistons	
Kris Joseph	July 15	Boston Celtics	
James Anderson	July 15	Houston Rockets	
Tim Ohlbrecht	July 15	Houston Rockets	
Drew Gooden*	July 16	Milwaukee Bucks	
Mike Miller*	July 16	Miami Heat	
Linas Kleiza*	July 16	Toronto Raptors	
Marcus Camby	July 17	Toronto Raptors	
D. J. White	July 18	Brooklyn Nets	
Bernard James	July 19	Dallas Mavericks	
Kevin Jones	July 19	Cleveland Cavaliers	
Chris Quinn	July 19	Cleveland Cavaliers	
Josh Akognon	July 21	Dallas Mavericks	
Malcolm Thomas	July 23	Chicago Bulls	
Dwayne Jones	July 24	Golden State Warriors	
Scott Machado	July 24	Golden State Warriors	
Kevin Murphy	July 24	Golden State Warriors	
Gustavo Ayón	July 25	Milwaukee Bucks	
Shavlik Randolph	August 1	Boston Celtics	
Al Harrington	August 2	Orlando Magic	
DeShawn Stevenson	August 2	Atlanta Hawks	
Justin Holiday	August 14	Philadelphia 76ers	
Fab Melo	August 30	Memphis Grizzlies	
Michael Beasley	September 3	Phoenix Suns	
Quentin Richardson	September 3	Toronto Raptors	
DeAndre Liggins	September 6	Oklahoma City Thunder	
Donté Greene	September 17	Boston Celtics	
Terrel Harris	September 23	Portland Trail Blazers	
Jerel McNeal	September 25	Utah Jazz	
Arinze Onuaku	November 12	New Orleans Pelicans	
Lance Thomas	November 12	New Orleans Pelicans	
Jamaal Tinsley	November 12	Utah Jazz	
Kwame Brown	November 20	Philadelphia 76ers	
Darius Morris	November 20	Philadelphia 76ers	
Elias Harris	November 29	Los Angeles Lakers	
D. J. Augustin	December 9	Toronto Raptors	
James Southerland	December 11	Charlotte Bobcats	
Josh Childress	December 13	New Orleans Pelicans	
Mike James	December 16	Chicago Bulls	
Hilton Armstrong	December 29	Golden State Warriors	
Lou Amundson	December 31	New Orleans Pelicans	
Chris Smith	December 31	New York Knicks	
Hedo Türkoğlu	January 3	Orlando Magic	
Solomon Jones	January 4	Orlando Magic	
Seth Curry	January 5	Memphis Grizzlies	
Maalik Wayns	January 5	Los Angeles Clippers	
Hamady N'Diaye	January 6	Sacramento Kings	
Andrew Bynum	January 7	Chicago Bulls	
Ryan Gomes	January 7	Boston Celtics	
Mike Harris	January 7	Utah Jazz	
Stephen Jackson	January 7	Los Angeles Clippers	
Cartier Martin	January 7	Atlanta Hawks	
Daniel Orton	January 7	Philadelphia 76ers	
Shawne Williams	January 7	Los Angeles Lakers	
Maalik Wayns	January 16	Los Angeles Clippers	
Tyshawn Taylor	January 23	New Orleans Pelicans	
Malcolm Thomas	January 23	San Antonio Spurs	
Othyus Jeffers	February 1	San Antonio Spurs	
Orlando Johnson	February 20	Indiana Pacers	
Roger Mason Jr.	February 20	Sacramento Kings	
Ronnie Brewer	February 21	Houston Rockets	
Earl Clark	February 21	Philadelphia 76ers	
Glen Davis	February 21	Orlando Magic	
Antawn Jamison	February 21	Atlanta Hawks	
Jared Cunningham	February 22	Atlanta Hawks	
Beno Udrih	February 24	New York Knicks	
Metta World Peace	February 24	New York Knicks	
Danny Granger	February 26	Philadelphia 76ers	
Caron Butler	February 27	Milwaukee Bucks	
Jimmer Fredette	February 27	Sacramento Kings	
Dexter Pittman	February 27	Atlanta Hawks	
Viacheslav Kravtsov	March 1	Phoenix Suns	
Ben Gordon	March 2	Charlotte Bobcats	
Arinze Onuaku	March 12	Cleveland Cavaliers	
Lorenzo Brown	March 14	Philadelphia 76ers	
DeAndre Liggins	March 14	Miami Heat	
Eric Maynor	March 17	Philadelphia 76ers	
Shane Edwards	March 21	Cleveland Cavaliers	
Erik Murphy	April 3	Chicago Bulls	
A. J. Price	April 3	Minnesota Timberwolves	
Andris Biedriņš	April 5	Utah Jazz	
Greg Smith	April 10	Houston Rockets	
Dexter Pittman	April 13	Houston Rockets	
Tornike Shengelia	April 14	Chicago Bulls	
Greg Stiemsma	April 14	New Orleans Pelicans	

Note

- * Released under the amnesty clause in the CBA, which gives teams a one-time option to waive a player's remaining contract from the salary cap.

==== Training camp cuts ====
All players listed did not make the final roster.

Atlanta Hawks	Boston Celtics	Brooklyn Nets	Charlotte Bobcats	Chicago Bulls
Eric Dawson; Royal Ivey; James Johnson; David Lighty; Adonis Thomas; Damien Wilkins	Chris Babb; Damen Bell-Holter; DeShawn Sims; Kammron Taylor	Gary Forbes; Jorge Guiterrez; Marko Jarić; Chris Johnson; Adonis Thomas	Troy Daniels; Abdul Gaddy; Patrick O'Bryant	Patrick Christopher; Dahntay Jones; Kalin Lucas; Dexter Pittman; D. J. White
Cleveland Cavaliers	Dallas Mavericks	Denver Nuggets	Detroit Pistons	Golden State Warriors
DeSagana Diop; Kenny Kadji; Michael Lee; Jermaine Taylor; Elliot Williams	Renaldo Balkman; Devin Ebanks; D. J. Kennedy; Mickey McConnell; Fab Melo	Reginald Becton; Kyle Fogg; Damion James		Joe Alexander; Seth Curry; Dewayne Dedmon; Cameron Jones
Houston Rockets	Indiana Pacers	Los Angeles Clippers	Los Angeles Lakers	Memphis Grizzlies
Marcus Camby; Troy Daniels; Jordan Henriquez; Reggie Williams; B. J. Young	Hilton Armstrong; Ron Howard; Darnell Jackson	Lou Amundson; Brandon Davies; Mustapha Farrakhan Jr.; JaMychal Green	Eric Boateng; Dan Gadzuric; Darius Johnson-Odom; Marcus Landry	Josh Akognon; Andre Barrett; Derrick Byars; Melvin Ely; Tony Gaffney; Willie Reed
Miami Heat	Milwaukee Bucks	Minnesota Timberwolves	New Orleans Pelicans	New York Knicks
Larry Drew II; Eric Griffin; Justin Hamilton; Jarvis Varnado; Charlie Westbrook	Olek Czyz; Stephen Graham; Trey McKinney-Jones	Lorenzo Brown; Othyus Jeffers; Chris Johnson	Rodney Carney; Lazar Hayward	Justin Brownlee; Ike Diogu; Chris Douglas-Roberts; C. J. Leslie; Josh Powell; Jeremy Tyler
Oklahoma City Thunder	Orlando Magic	Philadelphia 76ers	Phoenix Suns	Portland Trail Blazers
Diante Garrett; Rodney McGruder; Daniel Orton	Kris Joseph; Mickell Gladness; Manny Harris; Romero Osby	Solomon Alabi; Vander Blue; Mac Koshwal; Gani Lawal; Tim Ohlbrecht; Royce White; Rodney Williams; Khalif Wyatt	James Nunnally	Dee Bost; Richard Howell; E. J. Singler
Sacramento Kings	San Antonio Spurs	Toronto Raptors	Utah Jazz	Washington Wizards
Brandon Heath; DeQuan Jones; Trent Lockett	Marcus Cousin; Courtney Fells; Josh Howard; Myck Kabongo; Corey Maggette; Dan Nwaelele; Sam Young	Carlos Morais; Chris Wright	Dwayne Jones; Brian Cook; Justin Holiday; Lester Hudson; Scott Machado; Dominic McGuire	Shannon Brown; Josh Childress; D'or Fischer; Malcolm Lee; Kendall Marshall; Pops Mensah-Bonsu; Xavier Silas

== Draft ==
=== 2013 NBA draft ===
The 2013 NBA draft was held on June 27, 2013, at Barclays Center in Brooklyn, New York.

==== First round ====
Pick	Player	Date signed	Team	School/club team	Ref
1	Anthony Bennett	August 20	Cleveland Cavaliers	UNLV (Fr.)	
2	Victor Oladipo	July 7	Orlando Magic	Indiana (Jr.)	
3	Otto Porter	July 8	Washington Wizards	Georgetown (So.)	
4	Cody Zeller	July 10	Charlotte Bobcats	Indiana (So.)	
5	Alex Len	August 29	Phoenix Suns	Maryland (So.)	
6	Nerlens Noel	September 24	Philadelphia 76ers (acquired from New Orleans)	Kentucky (Fr.)	
7	Ben McLemore	July 13	Sacramento Kings	Kansas (Fr.)	
8	Kentavious Caldwell-Pope	July 19	Detroit Pistons	Georgia (So.)	
9	Trey Burke	July 6	Utah Jazz (acquired from Minnesota)	Michigan (So.)	
10	CJ McCollum	July 11	Portland Trail Blazers	Lehigh (Sr.)	
11	Michael Carter-Williams	September 24	Philadelphia 76ers	Syracuse (So.)	
12	Steven Adams	July 12	Oklahoma City Thunder (acquired from Toronto via Houston)	Pittsburgh (Fr.)	
13	Kelly Olynyk	July 7	Boston Celtics (acquired from Dallas)	Gonzaga (Jr.)	
14	Shabazz Muhammad	July 17	Minnesota Timberwolves (acquired from Utah)	UCLA (Fr.)	
15	Giannis Antetokounmpo	July 30	Milwaukee Bucks	Filathlitikos (Greece)	
16	Lucas Nogueira	—	Atlanta Hawks (acquired from Boston via Dallas)	Estudiantes (Spain)	
17	Dennis Schröder	July 11	Atlanta Hawks	Phantoms Braunschweig (Germany)	
18	Shane Larkin	July 29	Dallas Mavericks (acquired from Houston via Brooklyn and Atlanta)	Miami (FL) (So.)	
19	Sergey Karasev	August 20	Cleveland Cavaliers (acquired from L.A. Lakers)	Triumph Lyubertsy (Russia)	
20	Tony Snell	July 10	Chicago Bulls	New Mexico (Jr.)	
21	Gorgui Dieng	July 17	Minnesota Timberwolves (acquired from Golden State via Brooklyn and Utah)	Louisville (Jr.)	
22	Mason Plumlee	July 3	Brooklyn Nets	Duke (Sr.)	
23	Solomon Hill	July 3	Indiana Pacers	Arizona (Sr.)	
24	Tim Hardaway Jr.	July 8	New York Knicks	Michigan (Jr.)	
25	Reggie Bullock	July 11	Los Angeles Clippers	North Carolina (Jr.)	
26	André Roberson	July 12	Oklahoma City Thunder (acquired from Memphis via Houston, Minnesota and Golden State)	Colorado (Jr.)	
27	Rudy Gobert	July 6	Utah Jazz (acquired from Denver)	Cholet Basket (France)	
28	Livio Jean-Charles	—	San Antonio Spurs	ASVEL Basket (France)	
29	Archie Goodwin	July 12	Phoenix Suns (acquired from Golden State via Oklahoma City)	Kentucky (Fr.)	
30	Nemanja Nedović	July 9	Golden State Warriors (acquired from Miami via Cleveland, L.A. Lakers and Phoenix)	Lietuvos Rytas Vilnius (Lithuania)	

==== Second round ====
Pick	Player	Date signed	Team	School/club team	Ref
31	Allen Crabbe	July 10	Portland Trail Blazers (acquired from Cleveland via Orlando)	California (Jr.)	
32	Álex Abrines	—	Oklahoma City Thunder (acquired from Charlotte via Oklahoma City, Boston and Houston)	FC Barcelona (Spain)	
33	Carrick Felix	August 20	Cleveland Cavaliers	Arizona State (Sr.)	
34	Isaiah Canaan	July 15	Houston Rockets (acquired from Phoenix)	Murray State (Sr.)	
35	Glen Rice Jr.	July 8	Washington Wizards (acquired from Philadelphia via New Orleans)	Maryland (So.)	
36	Ray McCallum Jr.	July 18	Sacramento Kings	Detroit (Jr.)	
37	Tony Mitchell	July 19	Detroit Pistons	North Texas (So.)	
38	Nate Wolters	August 1	Milwaukee Bucks (acquired from Washington via Philadelphia)	South Dakota State (Sr.)	
39	Jeff Withey	July 30	Portland Trail Blazers (acquired from Minnesota via Cleveland and Boston; later traded to New Orleans)	Kansas (Sr.)	
40	Grant Jerrett	—	Oklahoma City Thunder (acquired from Portland)	Arizona (Fr.)	
41	Jamaal Franklin	July 26	Memphis Grizzlies (acquired from Toronto via Dallas and Toronto)	San Diego State (Jr.)	
42	Pierre Jackson	—	New Orleans Pelicans (acquired from Philadelphia)	Baylor (Sr.)	
43	Ricky Ledo	July 24	Dallas Mavericks (acquired from Milwaukee via Philadelphia)	Providence (Fr.)	
44	Mike Muscala	—	Atlanta Hawks (acquired from Dallas)	Bucknell (Sr.)	
45	Marko Todorović	—	Portland Trail Blazers (acquired from Boston; later traded to Houston)	FC Barcelona (Spain)	
46	Erick Green	—	Denver Nuggets (acquired from Utah)	Virginia Tech (Sr.)	
47	Raulzinho Neto	—	Atlanta Hawks	Lagun Aro GBC (Spain)	
48	Ryan Kelly	September 20	Los Angeles Lakers	Duke (Sr.)	
49	Erik Murphy	July 10	Chicago Bulls	Florida (Sr.)	
50	James Ennis	—	Miami Heat (acquired from Atlanta)	Long Beach State (Sr.)	
51	Romero Osby	September 27	Orlando Magic (acquired from Denver)	Oklahoma (Sr.)	
52	Lorenzo Brown	September 26	Minnesota Timberwolves (acquired from Brooklyn via Minnesota and New Orleans)	NC State (Jr.)	
53	Colton Iverson	—	Boston Celtics (acquired from Indiana)	Arizona (Sr.)	
54	Arsalan Kazemi	—	Philadelphia 76ers (acquired from Washington via New York)	Oregon (Sr.)	
55	Joffrey Lauvergne	—	Denver Nuggets (acquired from Memphis)	Partizan Belgrade (Serbia)	
56	Peyton Siva	August 5	Detroit Pistons (acquired from L.A. Clippers)	Louisville (Sr.)	
57	Alex Oriakhi	—	Phoenix Suns (acquired from Denver via L.A. Lakers)	Missouri (Sr.)	
58	Deshaun Thomas	—	San Antonio Spurs	Ohio State (Jr.)	
59	Bojan Dubljević	—	Minnesota Timberwolves (acquired from Oklahoma City)	Valencia Basket (Spain)	
60	Jānis Timma	—	Memphis Grizzlies (acquired from Miami)	BK Ventspils (Latvia)	

=== Previous years draftees ===
Draft	Pick	Player	Date signed	Team	Previous team	Ref
2012	58	Robbie Hummel	September 26	Minnesota Timberwolves	Obradoiro CAB (Spain)	
2012	52	Ognjen Kuzmić	September 27	Golden State Warriors	Joventut Badalona (Spain)	
