= 2012–13 Houston Rockets season =

- Head coach: Kevin McHale
- General manager: Daryl Morey
- Owner: Leslie Alexander
- Arena: Toyota Center

Results
- Record: 45–37 (.549)
- Place: Division: 3rd (Southwest); Conference: 8th (Western)
- Playoff finish: First Round (lost to Thunder 2–4)
- Stats at Basketball Reference

Local media
- Television: CSN Houston
- Radio: Sportstalk 790

The 2012–13 Houston Rockets season was the 46th season of the franchise in the National Basketball Association (NBA), and the 42nd based in Houston.

The season is best remembered for acquiring All-Star and Sixth Man of the Year James Harden from the Oklahoma City Thunder in a trade. Along with Harden, the team brought in point guard Jeremy Lin after a magical season with the New York Knicks the prior year and center Omer Asik.

Despite a stellar season from new team captains Harden and Lin, the Rockets only managed to play mediocre basketball all season finishing with a 45–37 record, clinching the number 8 seed in the West. The Rockets season ended with a first round loss to Harden's former team, the Oklahoma City Thunder, in six games. As Houston hosted the 2013 NBA All-Star Game, Harden was the only representative.

== Key dates ==
- June 26: The Rockets trade forward Chase Budinger and their rights to Lior Eliyahu to the Minnesota Timberwolves for their 18th draft pick.
- June 27: Houston trades center Samuel Dalembert and their 14th draft pick to the Milwaukee Bucks for shooting guard Shaun Livingston, small forward Jon Brockman, power forward Jon Leuer, and their 12th draft pick.
- June 28: The 2012 NBA draft takes place at Prudential Center in Newark, New Jersey.
- July 1: Free agency has begun.
- July 11: Teams can now sign, trade, and even amnesty players to their liking.
- July 13: Houston uses their amnesty clause on Luis Scola. His rights were received by the Phoenix Suns two days later.
- July 18: Houston officially signs point guard Jeremy Lin, after the New York Knicks decline on matching their offer.
- July 25: Houston officially signs center Ömer Aşık, after the Chicago Bulls decline on matching their offer.
- March 5: Houston sign 09-10 NBA Most Improved Player Award and former Sacramento Kings point guard Aaron Brooks. In addition, Houston waive F Tyler Honeycutt in order to make room for Aaron Brooks.

== Draft picks ==
Round	Pick	Player	Position	Nationality	College/Team
1	12	Jeremy Lamb	SG	United States	Connecticut
1	16	Royce White	PF	United States	Iowa State
1	18	Terrence Jones	PF	United States	Kentucky

== Roster ==
2012–13 Houston Rockets roster
Players

Pos.	No.	Player	Height	Weight	DOB	From
G/F	5	James Anderson	6 ft 6 in (1.98 m)	215 lb (98 kg)	1989–03–25	Oklahoma State
C	3	Ömer Aşık	7 ft 0 in (2.13 m)	255 lb (116 kg)	1986–07–04	Turkey
G	12	Patrick Beverley	6 ft 1 in (1.85 m)	185 lb (84 kg)	1988–07–12	Arkansas
G	0	Aaron Brooks	6 ft 0 in (1.83 m)	161 lb (73 kg)	1985–01–14	Oregon
G/F	10	Carlos Delfino	6 ft 6 in (1.98 m)	230 lb (104 kg)	1982–08–29	Argentina
G/F	32	Francisco García	6 ft 7 in (2.01 m)	195 lb (88 kg)	1981–12–31	Dominican Republic
G	13	James Harden	6 ft 5 in (1.96 m)	220 lb (100 kg)	1989–08–26	Arizona State
F	6	Terrence Jones	6 ft 9 in (2.06 m)	252 lb (114 kg)	1992–01–09	Kentucky
G	7	Jeremy Lin	6 ft 3 in (1.91 m)	200 lb (91 kg)	1988–08–23	Harvard
F/C	20	Donatas Motiejūnas	7 ft 0 in (2.13 m)	222 lb (101 kg)	1990–09–20	Lithuania
F/C	14	Tim Ohlbrecht	6 ft 11 in (2.11 m)	255 lb (116 kg)	1988–08–30	Germany
F	25	Chandler Parsons	6 ft 9 in (2.06 m)	227 lb (103 kg)	1988–10–25	Florida
F	41	Thomas Robinson	6 ft 10 in (2.08 m)	237 lb (108 kg)	1991–03–17	Kansas
F/C	4	Greg Smith	6 ft 10 in (2.08 m)	250 lb (113 kg)	1991–01–08	Fresno State
F	30	Royce White (DL)	6 ft 8 in (2.03 m)	260 lb (118 kg)	1991–04–10	Iowa State

Coaches
Head coach
- Kevin McHale
Assistant(s)
- Kelvin Sampson
- J. B. Bickerstaff
- Chris Finch
- Greg Buckner
- Dean Cooper
- Jesse Mermuys

Legend
- (DP) Unsigned draft pick
- (FA) Free agent
- (S) Suspended
- (DL) On assignment to D-League affiliate
- Injured

Roster
Updated: 2013–03–30

== Regular season ==
=== Game log ===
2012–13 game log
Total: 45–37 (home: 29–12; road: 16–25)
October: 1–0 (home: 0–0; road: 1–0)

Game	Date	Team	Score	High points	High rebounds	High assists	Location Attendance	Record
1	October 31	@ Detroit	W 105–96	James Harden (37)	Ömer Aşık (9)	James Harden (12)	The Palace of Auburn Hills; 16,646	1–0

November : 6–8 (home: 5–3; road: 1–5)

Game	Date	Team	Score	High points	High rebounds	High assists	Location Attendance	Record
2	November 2	@ Atlanta	W 109–102	James Harden (45)	Ömer Aşık (19)	Jeremy Lin (7)	Philips Arena; 18,238	2–0
3	November 3	Portland	L 85–95	James Harden (24)	Ömer Aşık (15)	Jeremy Lin (7)	Toyota Center; 18,140	2–1
4	November 7	Denver	L 87–93	Carlos Delfino (19)	Ömer Aşık (13)	Jeremy Lin (6)	Toyota Center; 13,372	2–2
5	November 9	@ Memphis	L 85–93	Chandler Parsons (19)	Ömer Aşık (13)	Patterson & Harden (4)	FedExForum; 16,087	2–3
6	November 10	Detroit	W 96–82	James Harden (20)	Aşık & Morris (8)	Jeremy Lin (8)	Toyota Center; 15,037	3–3
7	November 12	Miami	L 110–113	Chandler Parsons (25)	Ömer Aşık (14)	Jeremy Lin (6)	Toyota Center; 18,041	3–4
8	November 14	New Orleans	W 100–96	James Harden (30)	Ömer Aşık (12)	Lin, Harden & Delfino (4)	Toyota Center; 14,535	4–4
9	November 16	@ Portland	L 117–119	James Harden (29)	Ömer Aşık (16)	Jeremy Lin (11)	Rose Garden; 20,382	4–5
10	November 18	@ L. A. Lakers	L 108–119	Chandler Parsons (24)	Ömer Aşık (9)	Jeremy Lin (10)	Staples Center; 18,997	4–6
11	November 19	@ Utah	L 91–102	Patrick Patterson (19)	Chandler Parsons (10)	Chandler Parsons (5)	EnergySolutions Arena; 19,197	4–7
12	November 21	Chicago	W 93–89	James Harden (28)	Chandler Parsons (13)	Lin & Harden (3)	Toyota Center; 15,950	5–7
13	November 23	New York	W 131–103	James Harden (33)	Ömer Aşık (14)	James Harden (9)	Toyota Center; 18,038	6–7
14	November 27	Toronto	W 117–101	James Harden (24)	Ömer Aşık (18)	James Harden (12)	Toyota Center; 12,907	7–7
15	November 28	@ Oklahoma City	L 98–120	Patrick Patterson (27)	Ömer Aşık (12)	Jeremy Lin (8)	Chesapeake Energy Arena; 18,203	7–8

December : 10–6 (home: 7–3; road: 3–3)

Game	Date	Team	Score	High points	High rebounds	High assists	Location Attendance	Record
16	December 1	Utah	W 124–116	Patrick Patterson (20)	Ömer Aşık (12)	Jeremy Lin (8)	Toyota Center; 14,432	8–8
17	December 4	L. A. Lakers	W 107–105	Toney Douglas (22)	James Harden (10)	James Harden (6)	Toyota Center; 18,052	9–8
18	December 7	@ San Antonio	L 92–114	James Harden (29)	Jeremy Lin (6)	Patterson & Harden (5)	AT&T Center; 18,581	9–9
19	December 8	Dallas	L 109–116	James Harden (39)	Chandler Parsons (10)	James Harden (9)	Toyota Center; 15,726	9–10
20	December 10	San Antonio	L 126–134 (OT)	Jeremy Lin (38)	Ömer Aşık (10)	Jeremy Lin (7)	Toyota Center; 13,959	9–11
21	December 12	Washington	W 99–93	James Harden (31)	Ömer Aşık (16)	Jeremy Lin (6)	Toyota Center; 13,351	10–11
22	December 14	Boston	W 101–89	James Harden (21)	Ömer Aşık (10)	Chandler Parsons (8)	Toyota Center; 15,679	11–11
23	December 16	@ Toronto	L 96–103	James Harden (28)	Ömer Aşık (13)	Harden & Parsons (4)	Air Canada Centre; 17,863	11–12
24	December 17	@ New York	W 109–96	James Harden (28)	James Harden (10)	Jeremy Lin (8)	Madison Square Garden; 19,033	12–12
25	December 19	Philadelphia	W 125–103	James Harden (33)	Ömer Aşık (15)	James Harden (7)	Toyota Center; 15,266	13–12
26	December 22	Memphis	W 121–96	James Harden (31)	Ömer Aşık (12)	Jeremy Lin (11)	Toyota Center; 18,029	14–12
27	December 25	@ Chicago	W 120–97	James Harden (26)	Ömer Aşık (18)	Jeremy Lin (11)	United Center; 22,310	15–12
28	December 26	@ Minnesota	W 87–84	James Harden (30)	Ömer Aşık (17)	Chandler Parsons (5)	Target Center; 20,340	16–12
29	December 28	@ San Antonio	L 116–122	James Harden (33)	Ömer Aşık (10)	Jeremy Lin (8)	AT&T Center; 18,581	16–13
30	December 29	Oklahoma City	L 94–124	James Harden (25)	Aşık & Smith (8)	Jeremy Lin (7)	Toyota Center; 18,460	16–14
31	December 31	Atlanta	W 123–104	James Harden (28)	Ömer Aşık (17)	Jeremy Lin (8)	Toyota Center; 18,160	17–14

January : 8–9 (home: 3–2; road: 5–7)

Game	Date	Team	Score	High points	High rebounds	High assists	Location Attendance	Record
32	January 2	New Orleans	W 104–92	James Harden (31)	Patterson & Parsons (10)	Lin & Harden (7)	Toyota Center; 18,198	18–14
33	January 4	@ Milwaukee	W 115–101	James Harden (29)	Ömer Aşık (8)	Lin, Harden & Parsons (7)	BMO Harris Bradley Center; 15,867	19–14
34	January 5	@ Cleveland	W 112–104	James Harden (29)	Greg Smith (11)	Jeremy Lin (5)	Quicken Loans Arena; 16,866	20–14
35	January 8	L. A. Lakers	W 125–112	James Harden (31)	Lin, Harden & Delfino (6)	James Harden (9)	Toyota Center; 18,135	21–14
36	January 9	@ New Orleans	L 79–88	James Harden (25)	Patrick Patterson (10)	Jeremy Lin (5)	New Orleans Arena; 11,453	21–15
37	January 11	@ Boston	L 91–103	James Harden (24)	Ömer Aşık (11)	Jeremy Lin (6)	TD Garden; 18,624	21–16
38	January 12	@ Philadelphia	L 100–107	James Harden (29)	Ömer Aşık (10)	James Harden (6)	Wells Fargo Center; 17,329	21–17
39	January 15	L. A. Clippers	L 109–117	James Harden (23)	Ömer Aşık (9)	Jeremy Lin (10)	Toyota Center; 16,823	21–18
40	January 16	@ Dallas	L 100–105	James Harden (20)	Ömer Aşık (15)	Jeremy Lin (7)	American Airlines Center; 20,147	21–19
41	January 18	@ Indiana	L 95–105	Ömer Aşık (22)	Ömer Aşık (12)	James Harden (7)	Bankers Life Fieldhouse; 16,902	21–20
42	January 19	@ Minnesota	L 79–92	James Harden (18)	Greg Smith (8)	James Harden (5)	Target Center; 16,799	21–21
43	January 21	@ Charlotte	W 100–94	James Harden (29)	Aşık & Morris (8)	James Harden (7)	Time Warner Cable Arena; 16,108	22–21
44	January 23	Denver	L 95–105	James Harden (23)	Ömer Aşık (13)	James Harden (7)	Toyota Center; 16,867	22–22
45	January 25	@ New Orleans	W 100–82	James Harden (30)	Patrick Patterson (13)	Lin & Harden (8)	New Orleans Arena; 15,302	23–22
46	January 26	Brooklyn	W 119–106	James Harden (29)	Ömer Aşık (16)	Chandler Parsons (11)	Toyota Center; 18,236	24–22
47	January 28	@ Utah	W 125–80	James Harden (25)	Ömer Aşık (19)	Jeremy Lin (7)	EnergySolutions Arena; 18,387	25–22
48	January 30	@ Denver	L 110–118	Jeremy Lin (22)	Ömer Aşık (18)	Jeremy Lin (5)	Pepsi Center; 17,399	25–23

February : 6–5 (home: 4–1; road: 2–4)

Game	Date	Team	Score	High points	High rebounds	High assists	Location Attendance	Record
49	February 2	Charlotte	W 109–95	Patterson & Parsons (24)	Ömer Aşık (15)	James Harden (11)	Toyota Center; 15,494	26–23
50	February 5	Golden State	W 140–109	Jeremy Lin (28)	Ömer Aşık (15)	Jeremy Lin (9)	Toyota Center; 15,453	27–23
51	February 6	@ Miami	L 108–114	James Harden (36)	Ömer Aşık (14)	James Harden (7)	American Airlines Arena; 19,693	27–24
52	February 8	Portland	W 118–103	James Harden (35)	Ömer Aşık (13)	James Harden (11)	Toyota Center; 15,655	28–24
53	February 10	@ Sacramento	L 111–117	James Harden (30)	Ömer Aşık (12)	Patrick Beverley (8)	Power Balance Pavilion; 15,526	28–25
54	February 12	@ Golden State	W 116–107	James Harden (27)	Ömer Aşık (15)	Jeremy Lin (10)	Oracle Arena; 19,596	29–25
55	February 13	@ L. A. Clippers	L 96–106	Chandler Parsons (17)	Ömer Aşık (7)	Jeremy Lin (7)	Staples Center; 19,251	29–26
All-Star Break
56	February 20	Oklahoma City	W 122–119	James Harden (46)	Ömer Aşık (10)	Jeremy Lin (8)	Toyota Center; 18,224	30–26
57	February 22	@ Brooklyn	W 106–96	Carlos Delfino (22)	Ömer Aşık (11)	Jeremy Lin (6)	Barclays Center; 17,732	31–26
58	February 23	@ Washington	L 103–105	James Harden (27)	Ömer Aşık (10)	James Harden (6)	Verizon Center; 20,308	31–27
59	February 27	Milwaukee	L 107–110	James Harden (25)	Ömer Aşık (22)	James Harden (7)	Toyota Center; 15,463	31–28

March : 9–5 (home: 7–2; road: 2–3)

Game	Date	Team	Score	High points	High rebounds	High assists	Location Attendance	Record
60	March 1	@ Orlando	W 118–110	James Harden (24)	Ömer Aşık (12)	James Harden (8)	Amway Center; 16,677	32–28
61	March 3	Dallas	W 136–103	Chandler Parsons (32)	Ömer Aşık (10)	Jeremy Lin (9)	Toyota Center; 18,123	33–28
62	March 6	@ Dallas	L 108–112	James Harden (28)	Ömer Aşık (15)	James Harden (9)	American Airlines Center; 20,344	33–29
63	March 8	@ Golden State	W 94–88	Chandler Parsons (26)	Ömer Aşık (17)	James Harden (11)	Oracle Arena; 19,596	34–29
64	March 9	@ Phoenix	L 105–107	James Harden (38)	Ömer Aşık (16)	James Harden (8)	US Airways Center; 16,734	34–30
65	March 13	Phoenix	W 111–81	Donatas Motiejūnas (19)	Greg Smith (12)	Jeremy Lin (6)	Toyota Center; 18,132	35–30
66	March 15	Minnesota	W 108–100	James Harden (37)	Ömer Aşık (11)	James Harden (8)	Toyota Center; 18,046	36–30
67	March 17	Golden State	L 78–108	James Harden (21)	Ömer Aşık (11)	James Harden (8)	Toyota Center; 18,219	36–31
68	March 20	Utah	W 100–93	James Harden (29)	Ömer Aşık (12)	Jeremy Lin (6)	Toyota Center; 15,739	37–31
69	March 22	Cleveland	W 116–78	James Harden (20)	Greg Smith (13)	Jeremy Lin (6)	Toyota Center; 15,694	38–31
70	March 24	San Antonio	W 96–95	James Harden (29)	Ömer Aşık (14)	James Harden (6)	Toyota Center; 18,245	39–31
71	March 27	Indiana	L 91–100	James Harden (22)	Greg Smith (19)	James Harden (8)	Toyota Center; 18,134	39–32
72	March 29	@ Memphis	L 94–103	Chandler Parsons (16)	Greg Smith (9)	James Harden & James Anderson (4)	FedExForum; 18,119	39–33
73	March 30	L. A. Clippers	W 98–81	Chandler Parsons; Jeremy Lin & Francisco García (15)	Ömer Aşık (12)	Chandler Parsons (4)	Toyota Center; 18,303	40–33

April : 5–4 (home: 3–1; road: 2–3)

Game	Date	Team	Score	High points	High rebounds	High assists	Location Attendance	Record
74	April 1	Orlando	W 111–103	Ömer Aşık (28)	Ömer Aşık (18)	Jeremy Lin (11)	Toyota Center; 16,273	41–33
75	April 3	@ Sacramento	W 112–102	Chandler Parsons (29)	Terrence Jones (12)	Jeremy Lin (10)	Sleep Train Arena; 12,377	42–33
76	April 5	@ Portland	W 116–98	James Harden (33)	Ömer Aşık (11)	Jeremy Lin (8)	Rose Garden; 20,400	43–33
77	April 6	@ Denver	L 114–132	Jeremy Lin (23)	Ömer Aşık (9)	Patrick Beverley (9)	Pepsi Center; 19,155	43–34
78	April 9	Phoenix	W 101–98	James Harden (33)	Ömer Aşık (22)	Harden & Lin (6)	Toyota Center; 16,673	44–34
79	April 12	Memphis	L 78–82	James Harden (30)	Terrence Jones (12)	James Harden (6)	Toyota Center; 18,163	44–35
80	April 14	Sacramento	W 121–100	James Harden (29)	Ömer Aşık (12)	James Harden (9)	Toyota Center; 18,138	45–35
81	April 15	@ Phoenix	L 112–119	Chandler Parsons (24)	Ömer Aşık (7)	Chandler Parsons (7)	US Airways Center; 17,135	45–36
82	April 17	@ L. A. Lakers	L 95–99 (OT)	James Harden (30)	Ömer Aşık (12)	Jeremy Lin (8)	Staples Center; 18,997	45–37

2012–13 season schedule

=== Standings ===
Southwest Division	W	L	PCT	GB	Home	Road	Div	GP
y-San Antonio Spurs	58	24	.707	–	35–6	23–18	12–4	82
x-Memphis Grizzlies	56	26	.683	2	32–9	24–17	10–6	82
x-Houston Rockets	45	37	.549	13	29–12	16–25	6–10	82
Dallas Mavericks	41	41	.500	17	24–17	17–24	7–9	82
New Orleans Hornets	27	55	.329	31	16–25	11–30	5–11	82

Western Conference
#	Team	W	L	PCT	GB	GP
1	c-Oklahoma City Thunder *	60	22	.732	–	82
2	y-San Antonio Spurs *	58	24	.707	2.0	82
3	x-Denver Nuggets *	57	25	.695	3.0	82
4	y-Los Angeles Clippers	56	26	.683	4.0	82
5	x-Memphis Grizzlies	56	26	.683	4.0	82
6	x-Golden State Warriors	47	35	.573	13.0	82
7	x-Los Angeles Lakers	45	37	.549	15.0	82
8	x-Houston Rockets	45	37	.549	15.0	82
9	Utah Jazz	43	39	.524	17.0	82
10	Dallas Mavericks	41	41	.500	19.0	82
11	Portland Trail Blazers	33	49	.402	27.0	82
12	Minnesota Timberwolves	31	51	.378	29.0	82
13	Sacramento Kings	28	54	.341	32.0	82
14	New Orleans Hornets	27	55	.329	33.0	82
15	Phoenix Suns	25	57	.305	35.0	82

== Playoffs ==
2013 playoff game log
First Round: 2–4 (home: 1–2; road: 1–2)

Game	Date	Team	Score	High points	High rebounds	High assists	Location Attendance	Series
1	April 21	@ Oklahoma City	L 91–120	James Harden (20)	Terrence Jones (8)	Lin, Beverley (4)	Chesapeake Energy Arena; 18,203	0–1
2	April 24	@ Oklahoma City	L 102–105	James Harden (36)	Ömer Aşık (14)	Harden, Beverley (6)	Chesapeake Energy Arena; 18,203	0–2
3	April 27	Oklahoma City	L 101–104	James Harden (30)	Aşık, Harden (8)	Chandler Parsons (7)	Toyota Center; 18,163	0–3
4	April 29	Oklahoma City	W 105–103	Chandler Parsons (27)	Ömer Aşık (14)	Chandler Parsons (8)	Toyota Center; 18,081	1–3
5	May 1	@ Oklahoma City	W 107–100	James Harden (31)	Ömer Aşık (11)	Chandler Parsons (4)	Chesapeake Energy Arena; 18,203	2–3
6	May 3	Oklahoma City	L 94–103	James Harden (26)	Ömer Aşık (13)	James Harden (7)	Toyota Center; 18,357	2–4

2013 schedule

== Player statistics ==
Legend
GP	Games played	GS	Games started	MPG	Minutes per game
FG%	Field-goal percentage	3P%	3-point field-goal percentage	FT%	Free-throw percentage
RPG	Rebounds per game	APG	Assists per game	SPG	Steals per game
BPG	Blocks per game	PPG	Points per game

=== Regular season ===
Houston Rockets statistics
Player	GP	GS	MPG	FG%	3P%	FT%	RPG	APG	SPG	BPG	PPG
Jeremy Lin	82	82	32.2	.441	.339	.785	3.0	6.1	1.6	.4	13.4
Ömer Aşık	82	82	30.0	.541	.000	.562	11.7	.9	.6	1.1	10.1
James Harden	78	78	38.3	.438	.368	.851	4.9	5.8	1.8	.5	25.9
Chandler Parsons	76	76	36.3	.486	.385	.729	5.3	3.5	1.0	.4	15.5
Greg Smith	70	10	15.9	.620	.000	.623	4.6	.4	.3	.6	6.0
Carlos Delfino	67	5	25.2	.405	.375	.857	3.3	2.0	1.0	.1	10.6
Marcus Morris Sr.^{†}	54	17	21.4	.428	.381	.653	4.1	.9	.5	.3	8.6
Toney Douglas^{†}	49	0	18.6	.395	.377	.882	1.8	1.9	.8	.0	8.1
Patrick Patterson^{†}	47	38	25.9	.519	.365	.755	4.7	1.1	.4	.6	11.6
Donatas Motiejūnas	44	14	12.2	.455	.289	.627	2.1	.7	.2	.2	5.7
Patrick Beverley	41	0	17.4	.418	.375	.829	2.7	2.9	.9	.5	5.6
Cole Aldrich^{†}	30	0	7.1	.535		.444	1.9	.2	.1	.3	1.7
James Anderson^{†}	29	2	10.6	.406	.327	.895	2.0	1.1	.4	.1	4.0
Terrence Jones	19	0	14.5	.457	.263	.765	3.4	.8	.6	1.0	5.5
Thomas Robinson^{†}	19	0	13.0	.449	.000	.421	4.1	.5	.8	.3	4.5
Francisco García^{†}	18	5	17.7	.432	.386	.857	1.3	1.1	.8	.4	6.4
Daequan Cook^{†}	16	1	10.3	.356	.367	.667	1.1	.6	.4	.1	3.4
Aaron Brooks^{†}	7	0	5.4	.308	.286		.3	.9	.1	.4	1.4
Scott Machado	6	0	3.5	.500	.000	1.000	.2	1.0	.3	.0	1.3
Tim Ohlbrecht	3	0	4.0	.333		1.000	.3	.3	.3	.0	1.0

=== Playoffs ===
Houston Rockets statistics
Player	GP	GS	MPG	FG%	3P%	FT%	RPG	APG	SPG	BPG	PPG
James Harden	6	6	40.5	.391	.341	.803	6.7	4.5	2.0	1.0	26.3
Chandler Parsons	6	6	39.7	.452	.400	.643	6.5	3.7	.2	.3	18.2
Ömer Aşık	6	6	34.7	.564		.638	11.2	.5	.5	1.7	12.3
Patrick Beverley	6	5	33.3	.431	.333	1.000	5.5	2.8	1.2	.7	11.8
Francisco García	6	3	27.3	.440	.459	.600	3.3	1.5	.7	.8	10.7
Aaron Brooks	6	0	11.2	.382	.111	.600	1.5	1.8	.2	.2	5.0
Greg Smith	5	1	11.8	.667		.500	2.6	.0	.4	.4	3.6
Carlos Delfino	5	0	24.0	.375	.355	1.000	2.4	2.0	.6	.2	9.0
Jeremy Lin	4	3	21.0	.250	.167	1.000	2.0	2.0	.5	.3	4.0
Terrence Jones	2	0	17.5	.400	.000	.000	7.5	.5	.0	.5	4.0
James Anderson	2	0	9.0	.200	.000		2.0	.0	.0	.0	1.0
Donatas Motiejūnas	1	0	5.0	1.000		1.000	1.0	.0	.0	.0	5.0

- ^{†} Denotes player spent time with another team in the season. Stats reflect time with the Rockets only.
