= Tim Ohlbrecht =

German basketball player (born 1988)

Personal information
- Born: August 30, 1988 (age 38) Wuppertal, West Germany
- Listed height: 6 ft 11 in (2.11 m)
- Listed weight: 255 lb (116 kg)

Career information
- NBA draft: 2010: undrafted
- Playing career: 2005–2018
- Position: Power forward / center
- Number: 14

Career history
- 2005–2006: Bayer Giants Leverkusen
- 2006–2009: Brose Baskets
- 2006–2008: →TSV Breitengüßbach
- 2007–2008: →Nürnberger BC
- 2009–2011: Telekom Baskets Bonn
- 2011–2012: Skyliners Frankfurt
- 2012–2014: Rio Grande Valley Vipers
- 2013: Houston Rockets
- 2013: →Rio Grande Valley Vipers
- 2014: Fort Wayne Mad Ants
- 2014–2015: ratiopharm Ulm
- 2015–2016: Yenisey Krasnoyarsk
- 2016–2018: ratiopharm Ulm

Career highlights
- 2× NBA D-League champion (2013, 2014); German League champion (2007); 3× German League All-Star (2009, 2010, 2015); All-German League Second Team (2015); NBA D-League All-Star (2013); All-NBA D-League Second Team (2013)
- Stats at NBA.com
- Stats at Basketball Reference

Tim Ohlbrecht (born August 30, 1988) is a German former professional basketball player. He won 84 caps for the German men's national team, competing in the 2008 Olympic Games, the 2010 World Championships as well as the European Championships in 2009 and 2011. He mostly played for teams in the German Bundesliga. Ohlbrecht had three NBA appearances for the Houston Rockets. He won two NBA D-League championships.

== Professional career ==
Ohlbrecht began his professional playing career with the German League club Bayer Giants Leverkusen, during the 2005–06 season. He then signed with the German League club Brose Baskets in 2006. He was loaned to TSV Breitengüßbach, where he played in both the German 2nd Division, and the German 3rd Division, from 2006 to 2008. He was also loaned to Nürnberger BC, where he played in the German 2nd Division, during the 2007–08 season.

Ohlbrecht, due to his age, was available for the 2010 NBA draft, but subsequently went undrafted. Ohlbrecht then signed with Telekom Baskets Bonn for the 2010–11 season. In the summer of 2011, he signed with Skyliners Frankfurt for the 2011–12 season.

In November 2012, Ohlbrecht was acquired by the Rio Grande Valley Vipers. On February 4, 2013, he was named to the Prospects All-Star team for the 2013 NBA D-League All-Star Game. On February 25, 2013, he was signed to a multi-year deal by the NBA's Houston Rockets. The Rockets sent Ohlbrecht back to the Vipers as a D-League assignee on April 9, 2013. On July 15, 2013, he was waived by the Rockets.

On July 16, 2013, he was claimed off of waivers by the Philadelphia 76ers. However, he was later waived by the 76ers on October 16.

On November 30, 2013, he was re-acquired by the Rio Grande Valley Vipers. On March 1, 2014, he was traded to the Fort Wayne Mad Ants.

On August 5, 2014, he signed a one-year deal with ratiopharm Ulm.

On July 27, 2015, he signed with the Russian club Yenisey Krasnoyarsk for the 2015–16 season.

On June 30, 2016, Ohlbrecht returned to ratiopharm Ulm, signing a two-year contract. On May 6, 2017, he signed a contract extension with Ulm till June 2020.

He retired in 2018 due to problems with his knees.

== German national team ==
Ohlbrecht made his debut with the senior men's German national basketball team in 2008. He participated, together with Dirk Nowitzki, in the 2008 Summer Olympics. Ohlbrecht played again for Germany at the EuroBasket 2009, the 2010 FIBA World Championship, and the EuroBasket 2011.

== After his career ==
Ohlbrecht settled in Boerne, Texas and became a realtor. He also founded the Tim Ohlbrecht Elite Basketball program, offering individual practice for youth and collegiate athletes as well as basketball camps for children.

== NBA career statistics ==
Legend
GP	Games played	GS	Games started	MPG	Minutes per game
FG%	Field goal percentage	3P%	3-point field goal percentage	FT%	Free throw percentage
RPG	Rebounds per game	APG	Assists per game	SPG	Steals per game
BPG	Blocks per game	PPG	Points per game	**Bold**	Career high

=== Regular season ===
Year	Team	GP	GS	MPG	FG%	3P%	FT%	RPG	APG	SPG	BPG	PPG
2013–14	Houston	3	0	3.9	.333	–	1.000	.3	.3	.3	.0	1.0
Career		3	0	3.9	.333	–	1.000	.3	.3	.3	.0	1.0
