= Carlos Delfino =

Argentine basketball player (born 1982)

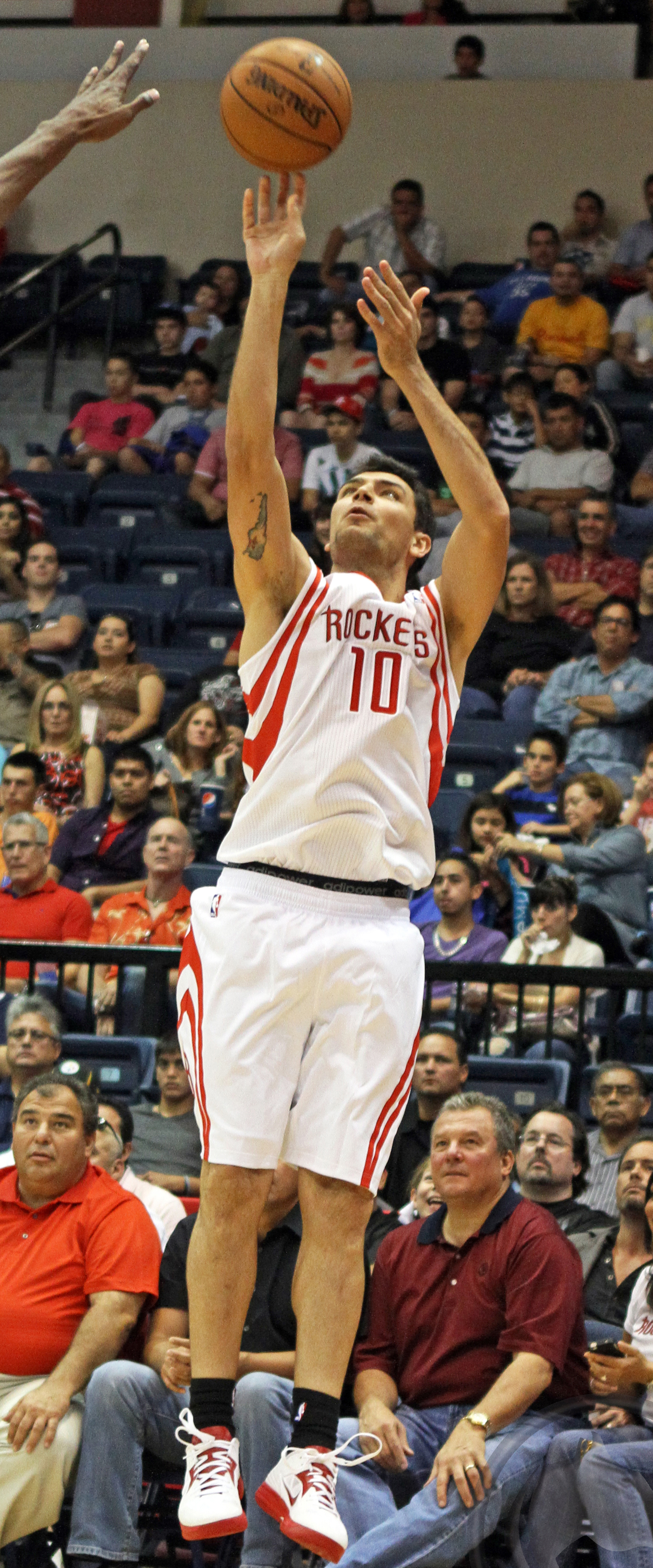
- Delfino with the Houston Rockets in 2012

Personal information
- Born: 29 August 1982 (age 44) Santa Fe, Argentina
- Listed height: 1.98 m (6 ft 6 in)
- Listed weight: 104 kg (229 lb)

Career information
- NBA draft: 2003: 1st round, 25th overall pick
- Drafted by: Detroit Pistons
- Playing career: 1998–2025
- Position: Small forward / shooting guard

Career history
- 1998–1999: Libertad de Sunchales
- 1999–2000: Unión de Santa Fe
- 2000–2002: Viola Reggio Calabria
- 2002–2004: Fortitudo Bologna
- 2004–2007: Detroit Pistons
- 2007–2008: Toronto Raptors
- 2008–2009: Khimki Moscow Region
- 2009–2012: Milwaukee Bucks
- 2012–2013: Houston Rockets
- 2017: Boca Juniors
- 2017: Baskonia
- 2018–2019: Auxilium Torino
- 2019: Fortitudo Bologna
- 2020–2023: Victoria Libertas Pesaro
- 2023–2025: Baltur Cento

Career statistics
- Points: 4,115 (8.1 ppg)
- Rebounds: 1,815 (3.6 rpg)
- Assists: 887 (1.7 apg)
- Stats at NBA.com
- Stats at Basketball Reference
Medals
Men's basketball
Representing Argentina
Summer Olympic Games
Gold medal – first place	2004 Athens
Bronze medal – third place	2008 Beijing
FIBA Diamond Ball
Bronze medal – third place	2004 Belgrade
Gold medal – first place	2008 Nanjing
FIBA AmeriCup
Gold medal – first place	2011 Mar del Plata
Gold medal – first place	2022 Brazil
Silver medal – second place	2007 Las Vegas
FIBA South American Championship
Gold medal – first place	2004 Rio de Janeiro

Carlos Francisco Delfino (born 29 August 1982) is an Argentine former professional basketball player. He played in the National Basketball Association (NBA) for the Detroit Pistons, Toronto Raptors, Milwaukee Bucks, and Houston Rockets. Standing at 1.98 m (6 ft 6 in), he plays at the small forward and shooting guard positions. He is also noted for his defense and three point shooting skills.

== Professional career ==
=== Early years ===
The son of Carlos and Cristina Delfino, he began his professional career playing in the Argentine Basketball League for Olimpia de Venado Tuerto in the 1998–99 season, and he then transferred to Unión de Santa Fe in 1999–2000.

=== Italian clubs ===
Delfino moved to Italy in 2000 and played four seasons in the Italian A League, the first two with Reggio Calabria and the other two seasons with Skipper Bologna.

In his first season in Italy, he played for Reggio Calabria. In just under 21 minutes per game he averaged 8.8 points, 2.5 rebounds and 1.9 steals. He scored a season-high 25 points in his second game against Scavolini Pesaro, making five of eight three-point attempts. He scored 15 points in just 20 minutes against Cordivari Roseto and tallied 14 points apiece against Paf Bologna, Muller Verona and Kinder Bologna. He hit at least one three-pointer in 19 of 24 games.

In his first season with Skipper Bologna, he moved into the starting lineup in the third game of the season and averaged about 26 minutes. He scored 18 points, including shooting 3-of-5 from three-point range, versus Euro Roseto and posted double-doubles against Benetton Treviso (13 points, 13 rebounds), Oregon Scientific Cantù (15 points, 11 rebounds) and Pippo Milano (14 points, 11 rebounds). He suffered torn ligaments in his ankle late in the season, but returned in late May.

=== Detroit Pistons (2004–2007) ===
Beginning in 2004, Delfino signed to play for the Detroit Pistons of the National Basketball Association, who made him the 25th pick in the first round of the 2003 NBA draft, making him the first Argentine player ever to be selected in the first round of the NBA draft. In November 2004, he suffered a knee injury that kept him on the injured list for over three months. He had an operation in the U.S. and then another in Argentina, where he recovered. However, Delfino did not immediately return to form after his rehabilitation, and was left off the Pistons' 2005 playoff roster. After he recovered from the knee injury, Delfino averaged 15.3 minutes, 3.9 points, 1.8 rebounds, and 1.3 assists per game in 30 games under coach Larry Brown. Many regarded Brown as having limited space for Delfino's offensive creativity. It was perceived that under the Pistons upcoming new coach Flip Saunders, that Delfino would thrive.

In his second season on the Pistons' active roster, Carlos averaged 10.7 minutes, 3.6 points, 1.7 rebounds, and 0.6 assists per game. Delfino played off the bench substituting for either Tayshaun Prince or Richard Hamilton. He had three straight games where he scored in double digits before being sidelined for the next 4 with the flu. Delfino became an important change-of-pace player in Flip Saunders' offensive scheme.

=== Toronto Raptors ===
On June 15, 2007, the Detroit Pistons traded Delfino to the Toronto Raptors for 2nd-round draft picks in both the 2009 NBA draft and the 2011 NBA draft. The 2007–08 season was his most productive in the NBA, as he averaged 9 points, 4.4 rebounds and 1.8 assists per game during the regular season.

On June 16, 2009, the Toronto Raptors extended a qualifying offer to Delfino.

=== Khimki ===
In the summer of 2008, Delfino signed a 3-year contract with the Russian Super League club Khimki Moscow Region. Delfino was one of the highest-paid basketball players in Europe, earning about US$10 million per season, plus a house, a car and a driver, and savings on taxes. He averaged 13.0 points, 3.6 rebounds, 2.6 assists, and 1.5 steals per game in Europe's secondary level competition, the EuroCup, during the 2008–09 season.

=== Milwaukee Bucks (2009–2012) ===
On August 18, 2009, Delfino signed a three-year, $10.5 million contract with the Milwaukee Bucks via sign and trade, the Bucks also received Roko Ukić in exchange for Amir Johnson and Sonny Weems.

Delfino had a breakout season with the Bucks, as he posted career highs in points per game, rebounds per game, assists per game, steals per game and blocks per game, while playing 30 minutes per game. He also played a major role in the playoffs, shooting a career-high .405 from behind the 3-point line.

=== Houston Rockets (2012–2013) ===
On August 20, 2012, Delfino signed a two-year, $6 million contract with the Houston Rockets. After being a starter for three years in Milwaukee, Delfino became the sixth man for the Rockets in 2012–13. On June 30, 2013, Delfino was waived by the Rockets.

Delfino's final NBA game ever was during Game 5 of the 2013 Western Conference First Round on May 1, 2013. In that game, Houston would defeat the Oklahoma City Thunder 107 - 100 with Delfino playing for 10 minutes and the only stat he recorded was 1 assist. He missed the entire second half due to discomfort in his right foot, which was later found to have a fracture that caused him to miss the rest of the playoffs.

=== Injury-riddled seasons (2013-2016) ===
Delfino spent the next three years off the court due to various complications to the injury suffered while playing for Houston, which required nine surgical interventions. On July 17, 2013, Delfino signed a two-year, $6.5 million contract with the Milwaukee Bucks. However, he never appeared in a game for the Bucks during the 2013–14 season due to his broken foot. On August 26, 2014, Delfino was traded, along with Miroslav Raduljica and a 2015 second-round draft pick, to the Los Angeles Clippers in exchange for Jared Dudley and a 2017 conditional first-round draft pick. Three days later, he was waived by the Clippers.

=== Comeback (2016-2017) ===
Delfino made his return to the courts in 2016 when he joined Argentina's senior basketball team at the Summer Olympics. On March 6, 2017, Delfino signed with the Argentine team Boca Juniors. There, he joined his brother Lucio, who was also recovering from injury.

On September 27, 2017, Delfino signed with Spanish club Baskonia. On October 26, 2017, Delfino finished his stint with Baskonia.

=== Return to Italy (2018–2023) ===
On July 3, 2018, Delfino came back to Italy after 14 years and signed a deal with Italian club Auxilium Torino.

On February 27, 2019, Delfino returned to Bologna and signed on the Lavoropiù Bologna.

After one year where Delfino didn't play anywhere, Jasmin Repeša, new coach of VL Pesaro, wanted him in his new team and he was the first hire for the season 2020-21 for Pesaro.

On October 8, 2025, Delfino announced his retirement from playing.

== National team career ==
Delfino was a member of Argentina's junior national team that won the bronze medal at the 2001 FIBA Under-21 World Championship that was held in Saitama, Japan. Delfino was also a part of the senior Argentine national basketball team that won the gold at the 2004 Summer Olympics. He also played with Argentina's senior national team at the 2006 FIBA World Championship and at the 2008 Summer Olympics, where he helped Argentina to win the bronze medal.

In 2011, he won the gold medal in the 2011 FIBA Americas Championship, held in Mar del Plata.

After years of absence following injury, he played with Argentina's senior basketball team at the 2016 Summer Olympics.

In 2022, Delfino won the gold medal in the 2022 FIBA AmeriCup held in Recife, Brazil. He was the Argentina's starting small forward in the tournament

== Career statistics ==
Legend
GP	Games played	GS	Games started	MPG	Minutes per game
FG%	Field-goal percentage	3P%	3-point field-goal percentage	FT%	Free-throw percentage
RPG	Rebounds per game	APG	Assists per game	SPG	Steals per game
BPG	Blocks per game	PPG	Points per game	PIR	Performance index rating
**Bold**	Career high	*	Led the league

=== NBA ===
==== Regular season ====
Year	Team	GP	GS	MPG	FG%	3P%	FT%	RPG	APG	SPG	BPG	PPG
2004–05	Detroit	30	4	15.3	.359	.257	.575	1.8	1.3	.7	.2	3.9
2005–06	Detroit	68	1	10.7	.403	.333	.672	1.7	.6	.3	.2	3.6
2006–07	Detroit	**82***	1	16.7	**.415**	.333	.787	3.2	1.1	.6	.1	5.2
2007–08	Toronto	**82***	0	23.5	.397	**.382**	.744	4.4	1.8	.8	.1	9.0
2009–10	Milwaukee	75	**66**	30.4	.408	.367	.782	**5.3**	**2.7**	1.1	**.3**	11.0
2010–11	Milwaukee	49	40	**32.4**	.390	.370	.800	4.1	2.3	**1.6**	.2	**11.5**
2011–12	Milwaukee	54	53	28.5	.402	.360	.792	3.9	2.3	1.5	.2	9.0
2012–13	Houston	67	5	25.2	.405	.375	**.857**	3.3	2.0	1.0	.1	10.6
Career		507	170	22.8	.401	.365	.758	3.6	1.7	.9	.2	8.1

==== Playoffs ====
Year	Team	GP	GS	MPG	FG%	3P%	FT%	RPG	APG	SPG	BPG	PPG
2006	Detroit	8	0	4.0	.167	**.500**	**1.000**	.5	.3	.1	.0	.6
2007	Detroit	**16**	0	8.4	**.405**	.188	.667	1.3	.5	.3	.1	2.3
2008	Toronto	5	0	24.2	**.405**	.267	.900	**4.8**	2.2	**.8**	.0	8.6
2010	Milwaukee	7	**7**	**32.3**	.356	.405	.750	4.0	**2.6**	.7	**.3**	**10.0**
2013	Houston	5	0	24.0	.375	.355	**1.000**	2.4	2.0	.6	.2	9.0
Career		41	7	15.5	.373	.337	.846	2.2	1.2	.4	.1	4.9

=== EuroLeague ===
Year	Team	GP	GS	MPG	FG%	3P%	FT%	RPG	APG	SPG	BPG	PPG	PIR
2002–03	Bologna	16	15	**31.8**	.393	.291	.673	**7.1**	1.7	**1.7**	**.3**	12.0	13.4
2003–04	Bologna	**21**	**16**	30.9	**.414**	**.338**	**.778**	6.0	**2.2**	**1.7**	.1	**12.4**	**13.7**
2017–18	Baskonia	2	0	5.0	.000	.000	.000	1.0	0.0	0.0	0.0	0.0	0.0
Career		39	31	31.3	.405	.314	.732	6.5	2.0	1.7	.2	12.2	13.6
