= Greg Smith (basketball, born 1991) =

American basketball player (born 1991)

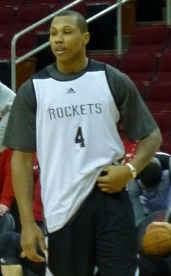
- Smith with the Houston Rockets in 2012

Personal information
- Born: January 8, 1991 (age 35) Vallejo, California, U.S.
- Listed height: 6 ft 10 in (2.08 m)
- Listed weight: 250 lb (113 kg)

Career information
- High school: Edison (Fresno, California); Westwind Academy (Phoenix, Arizona)
- College: Fresno State (2009–2011)
- NBA draft: 2011: undrafted
- Playing career: 2011–2020
- Position: Center / power forward
- Number: 0, 4

Career history
- 2011: Soles de Mexicali
- 2011–2012: Rio Grande Valley Vipers
- 2012–2014: Houston Rockets
- 2012–2013: →Rio Grande Valley Vipers
- 2014–2015: Dallas Mavericks
- 2016: Raptors 905
- 2016: Minnesota Timberwolves
- 2016: İstanbul BŞB
- 2017: Blackwater Elite
- 2017–2018: Osaka Evessa
- 2018: Bank of Taiwan
- 2019: Vaqueros de Bayamón
- 2019: Blackwater Elite
- 2019–2020: Mineros de Zacatecas

Career highlights
- BSN All-Star (2019); NBA D-League All-Star (2012); All-NBA D-League First Team (2012); NBA D-League All-Rookie First Team (2012); Second-team All-WAC (2011); WAC Freshman of the Year (2010); WAC All-Newcomer Team (2010)
- Stats at NBA.com
- Stats at Basketball Reference

Gregory Stephen Smith (born January 8, 1991) is an American former professional basketball player. He played college basketball for Fresno State before playing in the NBA and overseas.

== High school career ==
Smith attended Edison High School in Fresno, California from 2005 to 2008. As a junior in 2007–08, he averaged 22 points, 15 rebounds, five assists and five blocks per game. In 2008, he transferred to Westwind Preparatory Academy in Phoenix, Arizona where as a senior in 2008–09, he earned All-Arizona State honors and was nominated for the McDonald's All-America Team after he averaged 26 points, 14.4 rebounds, six blocks, four assists and three steals per game.

== College career ==
In his freshman season at Fresno State, Smith was named the 2009–10 WAC Freshman of the Year and earned Freshman All-American honors by CollegeInsider.com. In 33 games (all starts), he averaged 11.5 points, 5.8 rebounds, 1.2 assists and 1.2 blocks in 27.7 minutes per game.

In his sophomore season, Smith earned second-team All-WAC honors. In 31 games, he averaged 11.7 points, 8.1 rebounds, 1.7 assists, 1.1 steals and 1.1 blocks in 30.4 minutes per game.

In March 2011, Smith declared for the NBA draft, forgoing his final two years of college eligibility.

== Professional career ==
=== Soles de Mexicali (2011) ===
After going undrafted in the 2011 NBA draft, and with the NBA lockout affecting players from signing with teams or playing in the summer league, Smith joined Soles de Mexicali of the Liga Nacional de Baloncesto Profesional (LNBP) in August 2011. In his first professional game, Smith scored 18 points and grabbed 9 rebounds in a 107–72 win over the Aguilas Rojas. He appeared in 27 games for Soles before leaving the club in late November to return to the United States in the wake of the NBA lockout concluding.

=== Houston Rockets / Rio Grande Valley Vipers (2011–2014) ===
On December 13, 2011, Smith signed with the Houston Rockets. However, he was later waived by the Rockets on December 22, 2011, after appearing in two preseason games. On December 28, he was acquired by the Rio Grande Valley Vipers as an affiliate player.

On February 8, 2012, Smith re-signed with the Rockets to a multi-year deal. The next day, he was assigned back down to the Vipers. He was later recalled by the Rockets on February 18, reassigned on March 21 and recalled again on April 8 following the conclusion of the Vipers' season. Having played mostly for the Vipers in his rookie season, Smith was named to the All-NBA D-League first team and the All-Rookie first team.

In July 2012, Smith joined the Rockets for the 2012 NBA Summer League. On February 10, 2013, he was reassigned to the Vipers. Four days later, he was recalled by the Rockets. On March 30, 2013, Smith received his first career start. In 30 minutes of action, he recorded 9 points and 8 rebounds in a 98–81 win over the Los Angeles Clippers. He subsequently remained in the starting lineup for the remainder of the regular season. He went on to start the first game of the Rockets' first round playoff match-up against the Oklahoma City Thunder, but moved back to a bench role for game two following a large Game 1 loss.

In July 2013, Smith re-joined the Rockets for the 2013 NBA Summer League. On November 14, 2013, he injured his right knee during a game against the New York Knicks which resulted in Smith being helped from the floor and missing a month of action. On December 15, he returned to the line-up. However, he re-injured his knee a month later and was sidelined indefinitely. On April 10, 2014, he was waived by the Rockets.

=== Chicago Bulls / Dallas Mavericks (2014–2015) ===
On April 14, 2014, Smith signed with the Chicago Bulls for the rest of the 2013–14 season. However, still suffering from the knee injury he sustained in January, Smith did not appear in a game for the Bulls in 2013–14, missing the team's final two regular season games and all five playoff games against the Washington Wizards.

On July 14, 2014, Smith was traded to the Dallas Mavericks in exchange for the rights to Tadija Dragićević. He became a free agent in the summer of 2015.

=== Raptors 905 (2016) ===
On January 5, 2016, Smith was acquired by Raptors 905 of the NBA Development League. He made his debut for the team two days later, recording 15 points, 3 rebounds, 6 assists, 1 steal and 1 block as a starter in a 102–98 loss to the Sioux Falls Skyforce.

=== Minnesota Timberwolves (2016) ===
On March 2, 2016, Smith signed a 10-day contract with the Minnesota Timberwolves. He made his debut for the Timberwolves later that night in a 104–98 loss to the Washington Wizards, recording four points, one rebound and one assist in 10 minutes off the bench. He later signed a second 10-day contract with the Timberwolves on March 12, and a rest-of-season contract on March 23. On June 30, 2016, he was waived by the Timberwolves.

=== İstanbul BŞB (2016) ===
On October 7, 2016, Smith signed with İstanbul BŞB of the Turkish League. He appeared in seven games for İstanbul before parting ways with the team in late November.

=== Blackwater Elite (2017) ===
On March 4, 2017, Smith signed with Blackwater Elite as an import for the 2017 PBA Commissioner's Cup. In his PBA debut, Smith scored 37 points and grabbed a career-high 30 rebounds in a 116-118 2OT loss to the Phoenix Fuel Masters. In 10 games, he averaged 27.7 points, 21.2 rebounds, 5.1 assists, 1.2 steals and 1.0 blocks per game.

=== Osaka Evessa (2017–2018) ===
On August 8, 2017, Smith signed with Osaka Evessa of the Japanese B.League. He left the team in January 2018. In 20 games, he averaged 9.1 points and 7.5 rebounds per game.

=== Taiwan and Puerto Rico (2018–2019) ===
In October 2018, Smith signed with Bank of Taiwan, where he averaged 14.3 points, 13.5 rebounds, 3.7 assists, 1.7 steals, and 1.2 blocks, in 15 games. In January 2019, he signed with Puerto Rican team Vaqueros de Bayamón.

=== Return to Blackwater Elite (2019) ===
On July 15, 2019, Smith signed with Blackwater Elite, returning to the team for a second stint ahead of the 2019 PBA Commissioner's Cup playoffs. In Game 2 of the Commissioner's Cup Playoffs, Smith recorded 31 points and 18 rebounds to force a do-or-die Game 3 against Rain or Shine.

=== Mineros de Zacatecas (2019–2020) ===
On July 12, 2019, Smith signed with the Mineros de Zacatecas for the 2019–20 LNBP season.

== NBA career statistics ==
Legend
GP	Games played	GS	Games started	MPG	Minutes per game
FG%	Field goal percentage	3P%	3-point field goal percentage	FT%	Free throw percentage
RPG	Rebounds per game	APG	Assists per game	SPG	Steals per game
BPG	Blocks per game	PPG	Points per game	**Bold**	Career high

=== Regular season ===
Year	Team	GP	GS	MPG	FG%	3P%	FT%	RPG	APG	SPG	BPG	PPG
2011–12	Houston	8	0	8.6	.636	.000	.000	2.5	.1	.2	**.6**	1.8
2012–13	Houston	**70**	**10**	**15.9**	.620	.000	**.623**	**4.6**	**.4**	**.3**	**.6**	**6.0**
2013–14	Houston	11	0	9.1	**.643**	.000	.400	2.5	.0	.1	.2	3.5
2014–15	Dallas	42	2	8.6	.612	.000	.513	1.9	.2	.2	.3	1.9
2015–16	Minnesota	18	0	10.7	.563	.000	.412	2.3	.3	.2	.1	2.4
Career		149	12	12.3	.617	.000	.576	3.3	.3	.2	.4	4.0

=== Playoffs ===
Year	Team	GP	GS	MPG	FG%	3P%	FT%	RPG	APG	SPG	BPG	PPG
2013	Houston	**5**	**1**	**11.8**	**.667**	.000	**.500**	**2.6**	.0	**.4**	**.4**	**3.6**
2015	Dallas	1	0	1.0	.000	.000	.000	.0	.0	.0	.0	.0
Career		6	1	10.0	.667	.000	.500	2.2	.0	.3	.3	3.0

== Personal life ==
Smith is the son of Cheryl Duckworth and has an older sister, Ashely and a younger brother, Divante. His uncle, Steve Shelley, was a Fresno State wide receiver in 1988–89 who later signed with the San Diego Chargers in 1990.
