= List of 2015–16 NBA season transactions =

This is a list of all personnel changes that occurred during the 2015 National Basketball Association (NBA) off-season and 2015–16 NBA season.

== Retirements ==
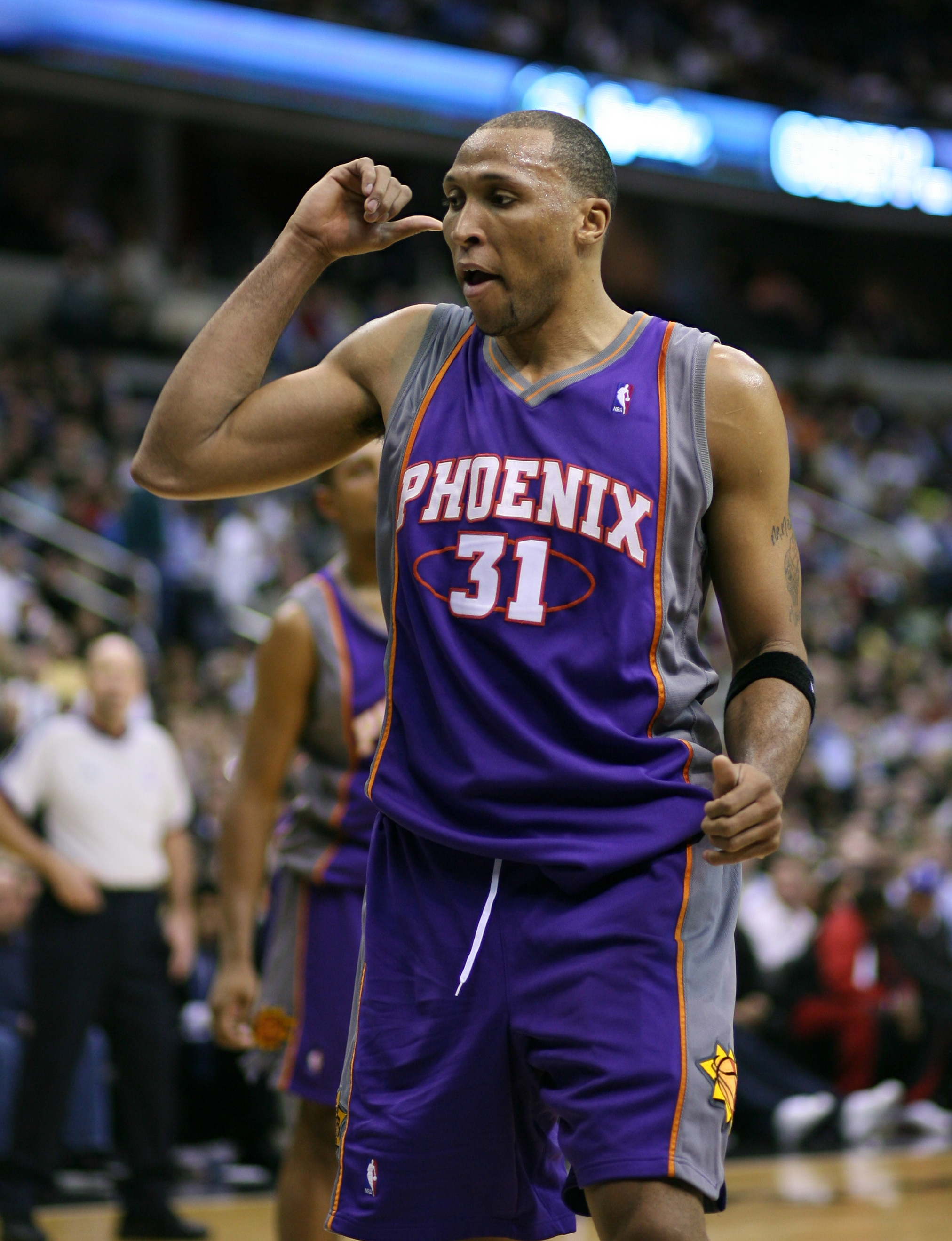
Shawn Marion with the Phoenix Suns

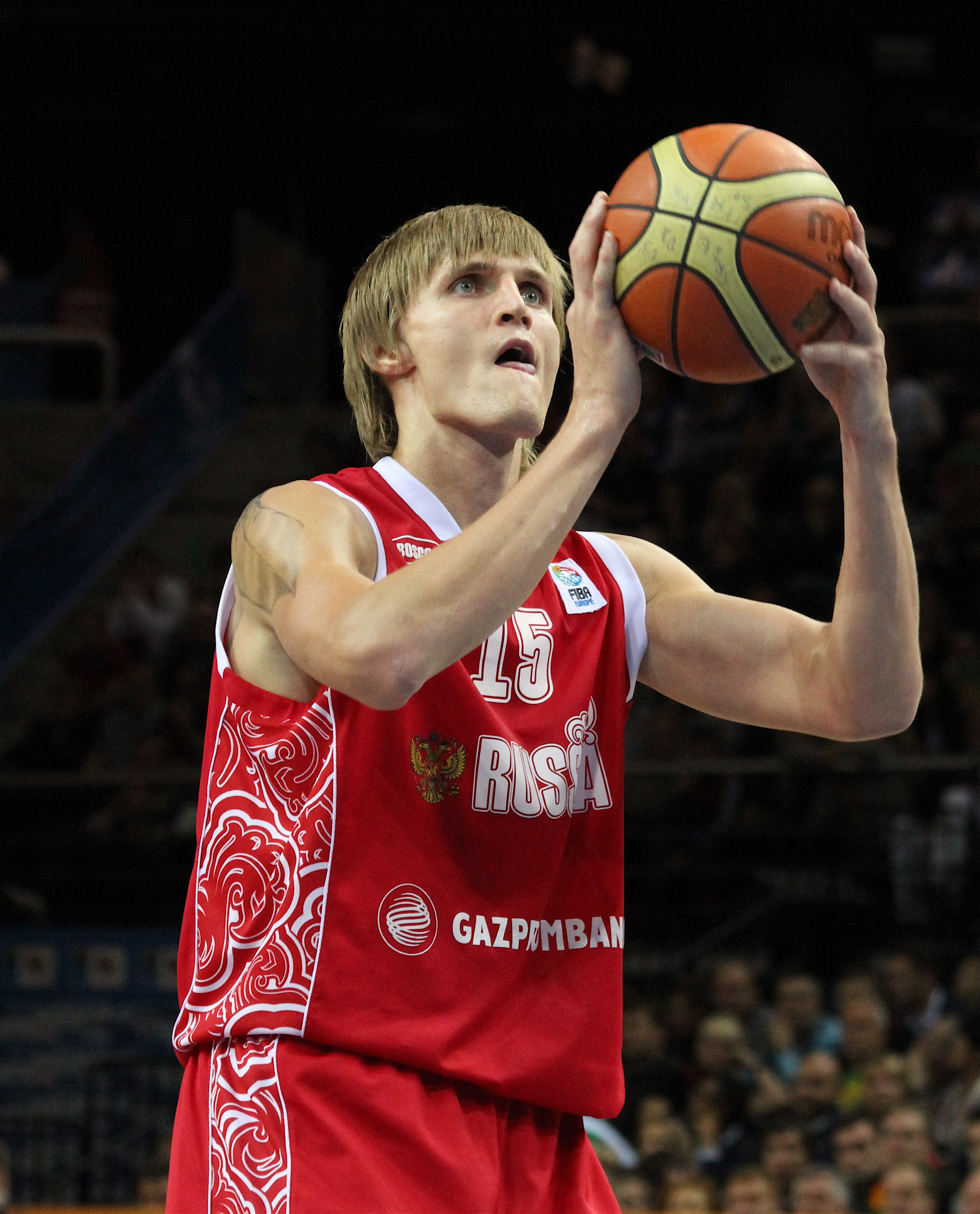
Andrei Kirilenko with the Russia national team

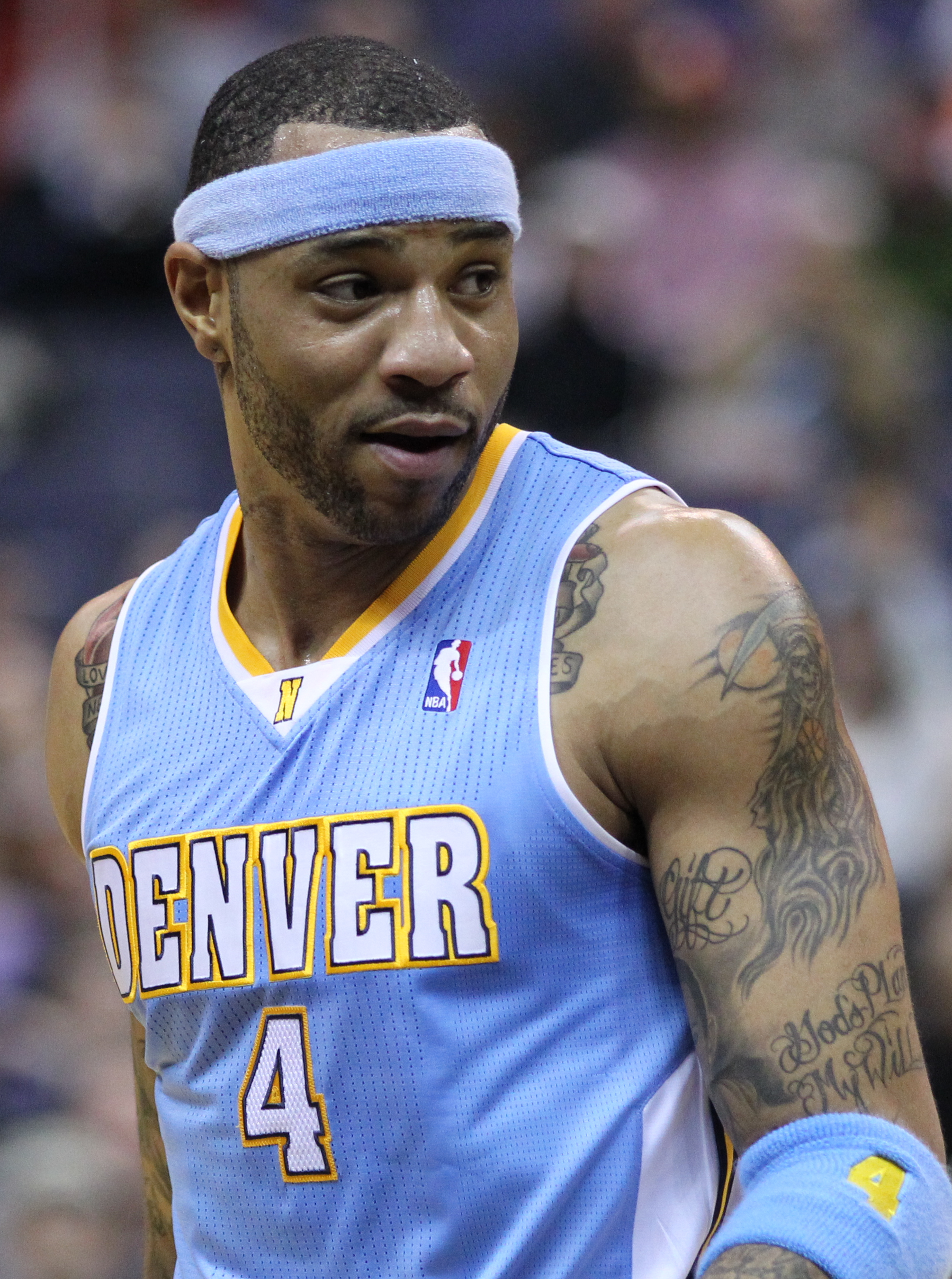
Kenyon Martin with the Denver Nuggets

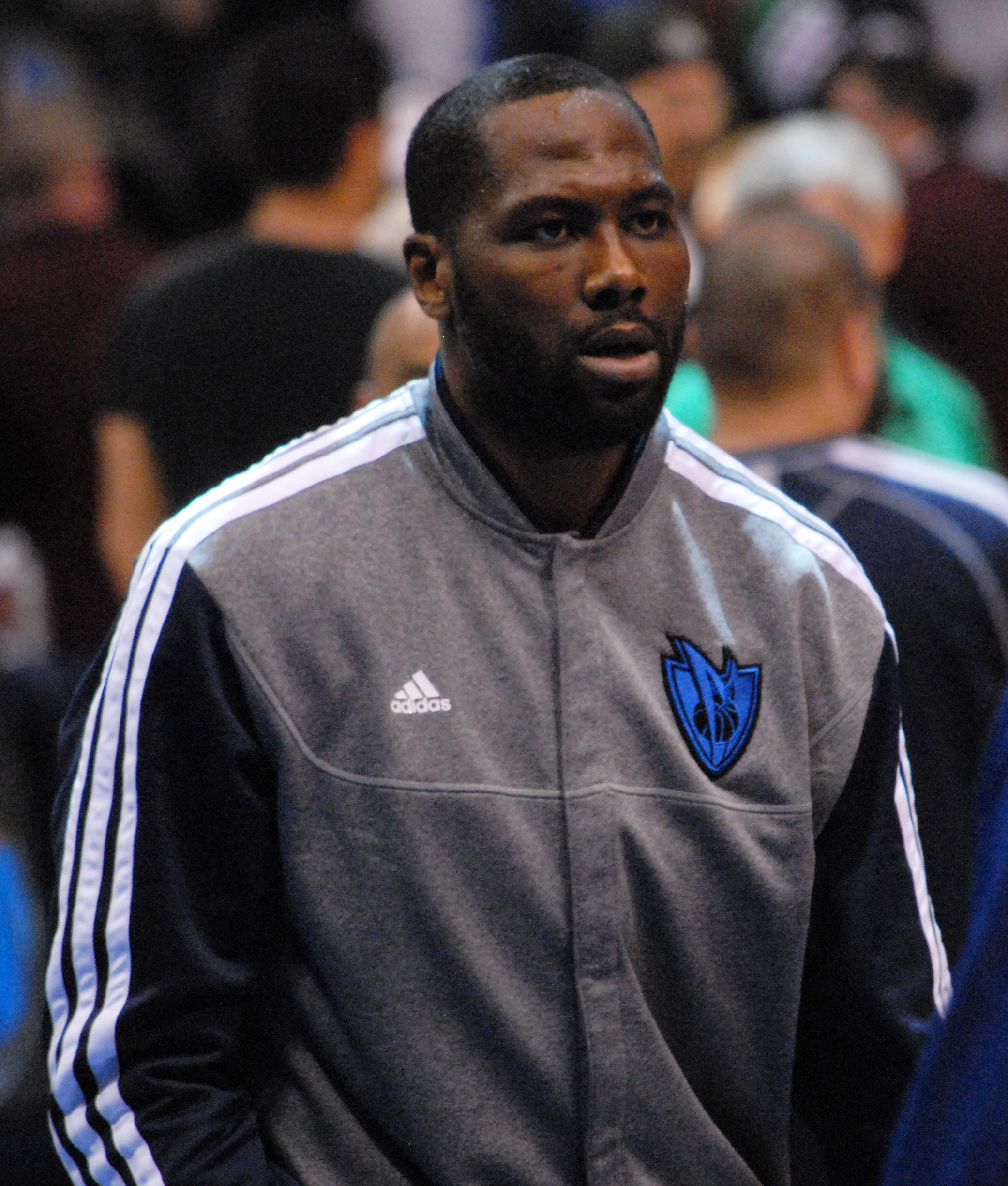
Elton Brand with the Dallas Mavericks

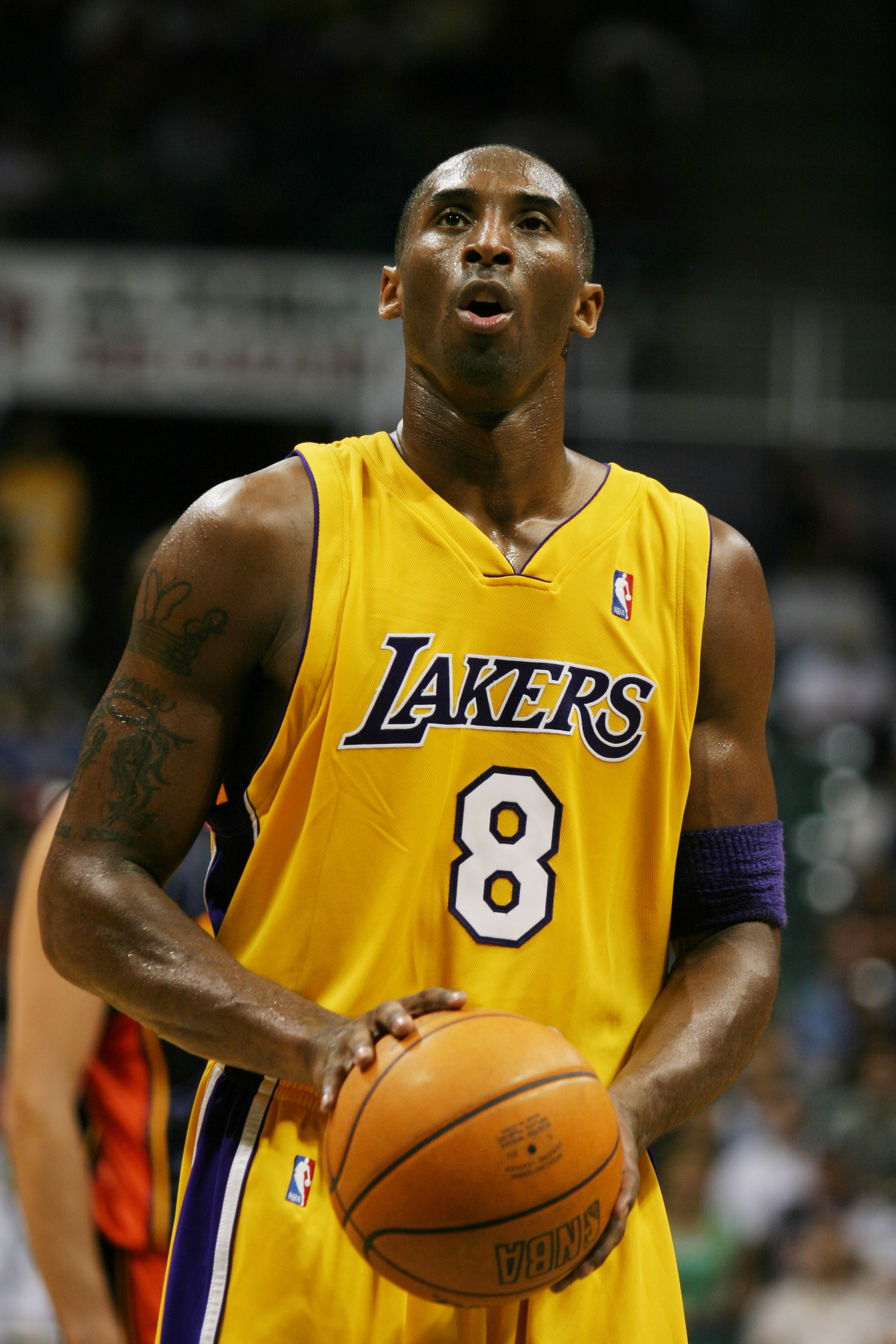
Kobe Bryant with the Los Angeles Lakers

| Date | Name | Team(s) played (years) | Age | Notes | Ref. |
|---|---|---|---|---|---|
| May 18 | Julius Hodge | Denver Nuggets (2005–2007); Milwaukee Bucks (2007) | 31 | Also played overseas and other American leagues. Was hired as director of player development at the University at Buffalo. | |
| June 7 | Darius Songaila | Sacramento Kings (2003–2005); Chicago Bulls (2005–2006); Washington Wizards (2006–2009); New Orleans Hornets (2009–2010); Philadelphia 76ers (2010–2011) | 37 | Started his career in Russia, finished his career in his home country, Lithuania. | |
| June 18 | Shawn Marion | Phoenix Suns (1999–2008); Miami Heat (2008–2009); Toronto Raptors (2009); Dallas Mavericks (2009–2014); Cleveland Cavaliers (2014–2015) | 37 | NBA champion (2011); 4× NBA All-Star (2003, 2005–2007) | |
| June 19 | Aaron Gray | Chicago Bulls (2007–2010); New Orleans Hornets (2010–2011); Toronto Raptors (2011–2013); Sacramento Kings (2013–2014) | 30 | Retired due to heart condition, joined the Pistons as an assistant coach. | |
| June 23 | Andrei Kirilenko | Utah Jazz (2001–2011); Minnesota Timberwolves (2012–2013); Brooklyn Nets (2013–2014) | 34 | NBA All-Defensive First Team (2006); also played six seasons in his home country of Russia | |
| July 2 | Kenyon Martin | New Jersey Nets (2000–2004); Denver Nuggets (2004–2011); Los Angeles Clippers (2012); New York Knicks (2013–2014); Milwaukee Bucks (2015) | 37 | Number 1 pick in 2000, played for the Xinjiang Flying Tigers of China during the 2011-12 lockout. | |
| July 22 | Stephen Jackson | New Jersey Nets (2000–2001); San Antonio Spurs (2001–2003, 2012–2013); Atlanta Hawks (2003–2004); Indiana Pacers (2004–2007); Golden State Warriors (2007–2009); Charlotte Bobcats (2009–2011); Milwaukee Bucks (2011–2012); Los Angeles Clippers (2013–2014) | 37 | NBA champion (2003) | |
| July 25 | Kelenna Azubuike | Golden State Warriors (2007–2010); Dallas Mavericks (2012) | 31 | Also played in the D-League | |
| August 11 | Elton Brand | Chicago Bulls (1999–2001); Los Angeles Clippers (2001–2008); Philadelphia 76ers (2008–2012); Dallas Mavericks (2012–2013); Atlanta Hawks (2013–2015) | 36 | Came out of retirement later in the season | |
| August 20 | Coby Karl | Los Angeles Lakers (2007–2008); Cleveland Cavaliers (2009); Golden State Warriors (2010) | 32 | Played in the D-League as well as overseas; later became assistant coach for Westchester Knicks. | |
| September 8 | Dee Brown | Utah Jazz (2006–2007); Washington Wizards (2008); Phoenix Suns (2008–2009) | 31 | Played majority of career overseas. Was hired by the Illinois Fighting Illini as a special assistant to the director of athletics. | |
| September 23 | Jason Richardson | Golden State Warriors (2001–2007); Charlotte Bobcats (2007–2008); Phoenix Suns (2008–2010); Orlando Magic (2010–2012); Philadelphia 76ers (2012–2015) | 34 | 2× Slam Dunk Contest champion (2002, 2003); NBA All-Rookie First Team (2002) | |
| September 24 | Matt Walsh | Miami Heat (2005) | 32 | Played in other leagues his whole career | |
| October 9 | Daniel Gibson | Cleveland Cavaliers (2006–2013) | 29 | NBA Rookie Challenge MVP (2008); Retired to pursue a career as a rapper. | |
| October 9 | Nazr Mohammed | Philadelphia 76ers (1998–2001); Atlanta Hawks (2001–2004); New York Knicks (2004–2005); San Antonio Spurs (2005–2006); Detroit Pistons (2006–2007); Charlotte Bobcats (2007–2011); Oklahoma City Thunder (2011–2012); Chicago Bulls (2012–2015) | 38 | Came out of retirement later in the season | |
| October 14 | Pops Mensah-Bonsu | Dallas Mavericks (2006–2007); San Antonio Spurs (2009); Toronto Raptors (2009, 2009–2010); Houston Rockets (2009); New Orleans Hornets (2010–2011) | 32 | Played in the D-League and overseas | |
| October 21 | Stephen Graham | Houston Rockets (2005); Chicago Bulls (2006); Cleveland Cavaliers (2006); Portland Trail Blazers (2006–2007); Indiana Pacers (2007–2009); Charlotte Bobcats (2009–2010); New Jersey Nets (2010–2011) | 33 | Also played in the CBA and overseas. Was hired as an assistant coach for the Fort Wayne Mad Ants of the D-League. | |
| October 26 | Sean May | Charlotte Bobcats (2005–2009); Sacramento Kings (2009–2010) | 31 | Also played overseas. Was hired as assistant to the director of player development for the North Carolina Tar Heels. | |
| November 13 | Hedo Türkoğlu | Sacramento Kings (2000–2003); San Antonio Spurs (2003–2004); Orlando Magic (2004–2009; 2010–2014); Toronto Raptors (2009–2010); Phoenix Suns (2010); Los Angeles Clippers (2014–2015) | 36 | NBA Most Improved Player (2008); also played four seasons in his home country of Turkey | |
| December 15 | Kosta Perović | Golden State Warriors (2007–2008) | 30 | Played his whole career (except 2007–08) overseas. | |
| February 22 | Nolan Smith | Portland Trail Blazers (2011–2013) | 27 | Played in the D-League as well as overseas from 2013 to 2015; became special assistant for Duke | |
| April 13 | Kobe Bryant | Los Angeles Lakers (1996–2016) | 37 | 5× NBA champion (2000–2002, 2009–2010); 2× NBA Finals MVP (2009–2010); NBA Most Valuable Player (2008); 18× NBA All-Star (1998-2011, 2013–2016) | |

== Front office movements ==
=== Head coach changes ===
Off-season

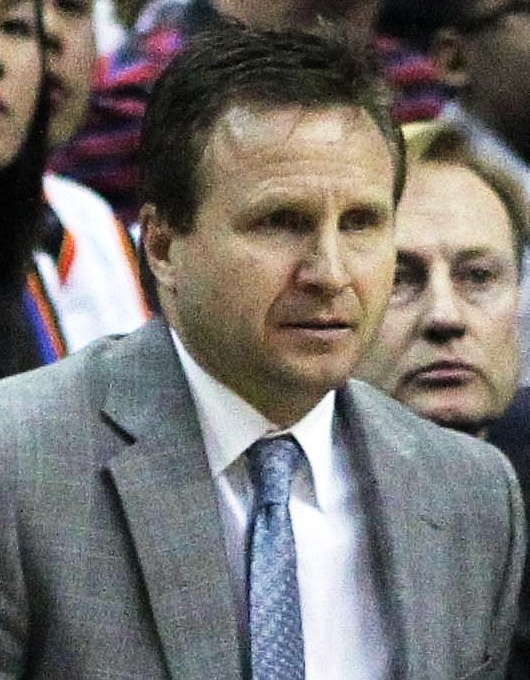
Scott Brooks was NBA Coach of the Year in 2010.

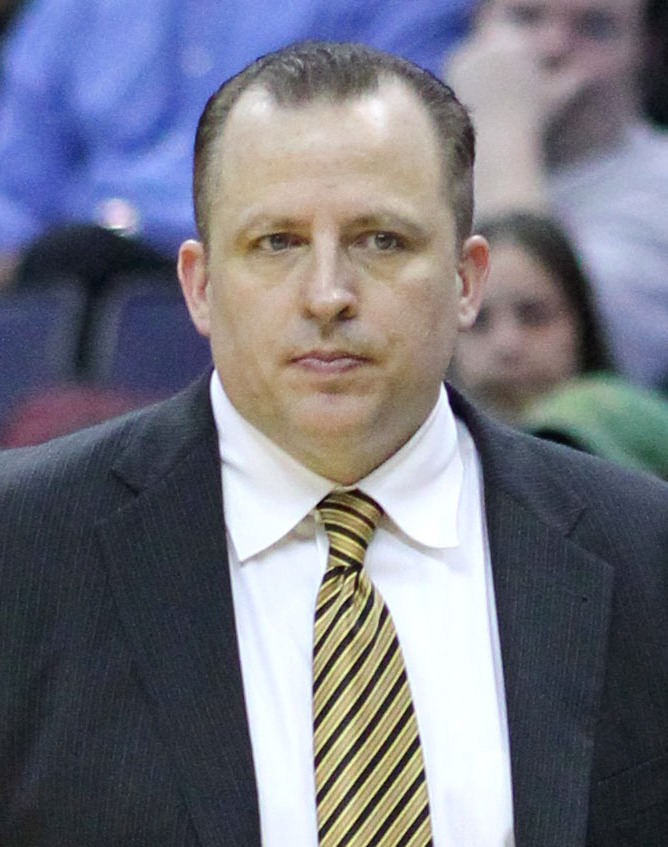
Tom Thibodeau was Coach of the Year in 2011.

| Hire date | Team | Outgoing head coach | Reason for departure | Incoming head coach | Last coaching position | Ref. |
|---|---|---|---|---|---|---|
| April 30 | Oklahoma City Thunder | Scott Brooks | Fired | Billy Donovan | Florida Gators head coach (1996–2015) | |
| May 29 | Orlando Magic | James Borrego | Interim coach, contract not renewed | Scott Skiles | Milwaukee Bucks head coach (2008–2013) | |
| May 30 | New Orleans Pelicans | Monty Williams | Fired | Alvin Gentry | Golden State Warriors associate head coach (2014–2015) | |
| June 2 | Chicago Bulls | Tom Thibodeau | Fired | Fred Hoiberg | Iowa State Cyclones head coach (2010–2015) | |
| June 15 | Denver Nuggets | Melvin Hunt | Interim coach, contract not renewed | Michael Malone | Sacramento Kings head coach (2013–2014) | |
| September 11 | Minnesota Timberwolves | Flip Saunders | Health reasons (died on October 25) | Sam Mitchell | Minnesota Timberwolves assistant coach (2014–2015) | |

Season

| Hire date | Team | Outgoing head coach | Reason for departure | Incoming head coach | Last coaching position | Ref. |
|---|---|---|---|---|---|---|
| November 18 | Houston Rockets | Kevin McHale | Fired | J. B. Bickerstaff (interim) | Houston Rockets assistant coach (2011–2015) | |
| January 10 | Brooklyn Nets | Lionel Hollins | Fired | Tony Brown (interim) | Brooklyn Nets assistant coach (2014–2016) | |
| January 22 | Cleveland Cavaliers | David Blatt | Fired | Tyronn Lue | Cleveland Cavaliers assistant coach (2014–2016) | |
| February 1 | Phoenix Suns | Jeff Hornacek | Fired | Earl Watson (interim) | Phoenix Suns assistant coach (2015–2016) | |
| February 8 | New York Knicks | Derek Fisher | Fired | Kurt Rambis (interim) | New York Knicks associate head coach (2014–2016) | |

=== General manager changes ===
Off-season

| Hire date | Team | Outgoing general manager | Reason for departure | Incoming general manager | Last managerial position | Ref. |
|---|---|---|---|---|---|---|
| June 30 | Atlanta Hawks | Danny Ferry | Resigned | Wes Wilcox | Atlanta Hawks assistant general manager (2012–2015) | |
| August 31 | Sacramento Kings | Pete D'Alessandro | Contract not renewed, signed with Denver | Vlade Divac | Sacramento Kings vice president of basketball and franchise operations (2015) | |

Season

| Hire date | Team | Outgoing general manager | Reason for departure | Incoming general manager | Last managerial position | Ref. |
|---|---|---|---|---|---|---|
| February 18 | Brooklyn Nets | Billy King | Reassigned | Sean Marks | San Antonio Spurs assistant general manager (2014–2016) | |
| April 10 | Philadelphia 76ers | Sam Hinkie | Resigned | Bryan Colangelo | Toronto Raptors president and general manager (2006–2013) | |

== Player movements ==
=== Trades ===
June
| June 11 | To Detroit Pistons: Ersan İlyasova | To Milwaukee Bucks: Caron Butler; Shawne Williams |
| June 15 | To Charlotte Hornets: Matt Barnes; Spencer Hawes | To Los Angeles Clippers: Lance Stephenson |
| June 24 | To Memphis Grizzlies: Luke Ridnour | To Orlando Magic: Rights to Jānis Timma |
| June 24 | To Charlotte Hornets: Nicolas Batum | To Portland Trail Blazers: Gerald Henderson Jr.; Noah Vonleh |
| June 25 (draft-day trades) | To Charlotte Hornets: Luke Ridnour | To Memphis Grizzlies: Matt Barnes |
| June 25 (draft-day trades) | To Charlotte Hornets: Jeremy Lamb | To Oklahoma City Thunder: Luke Ridnour; Conditional 2016 second-round pick |
| June 25 (draft-day trades) | To Atlanta Hawks: Draft rights to Jerian Grant; Two future second-round picks | To Washington Wizards: Draft rights to Kelly Oubre Jr. |
| June 25 (draft-day trades) | To Atlanta Hawks: Tim Hardaway Jr. | To New York Knicks: Draft rights to Jerian Grant |
| June 25 (draft-day trades) | To Milwaukee Bucks: Greivis Vásquez | To Toronto Raptors: Draft rights to Norman Powell; Protected 2017 Los Angeles Clippers first-round pick |
| June 25 (draft-day trades) | To Los Angeles Clippers: Draft rights to Branden Dawson | To New Orleans Pelicans: Cash considerations |
| June 25 (draft-day trades) | To Cleveland Cavaliers: Draft rights to Rakeem Christmas; Draft rights to Cedi Osman; 2019 Minnesota second-round pick | To Minnesota Timberwolves: Draft rights to Tyus Jones |
| June 25 (draft-day trades) | To Brooklyn Nets: Steve Blake; Draft rights to Rondae Hollis-Jefferson | To Portland Trail Blazers: Mason Plumlee; Draft rights to Pat Connaughton |
| June 25 (draft-day trades) | To Portland Trail Blazers: Draft rights to Dani Díez | To Utah Jazz: Cash considerations |
| June 25 (draft-day trades) | To Memphis Grizzlies: Draft rights to Andrew Harrison | To Phoenix Suns: Jon Leuer |
| June 25 (draft-day trades) | To Brooklyn Nets: Draft rights to Juan Pablo Vaulet | To Charlotte Hornets: 2018 second-round pick; 2019 Brooklyn second-round pick; Cash considerations |
| June 26 | To New York Knicks: Draft rights to Willy Hernangómez | To Philadelphia 76ers: Two future second-round picks; Cash considerations |
| June 30 | To Oklahoma City Thunder: Rights to Tomislav Zubčić | To Toronto Raptors: Luke Ridnour; Cash considerations |
July
| July 9 | To Atlanta Hawks: Tiago Splitter | To San Antonio Spurs: Rights to Georgios Printezis; Future second-round pick |
| July 9 | To Detroit Pistons: Reggie Bullock; Danny Granger; Marcus Morris | To Phoenix Suns: 2020 second-round pick |
| July 9 | To New York Knicks: Kyle O'Quinn (sign and trade) | To Orlando Magic: Right to exchange 2019 second-round draft selections; Cash considerations |
| July 9 | To Sacramento Kings: 2016 second-round pick | To San Antonio Spurs: Ray McCallum Jr. |
| July 9 | To Milwaukee Bucks: Future second-round pick | To Washington Wizards: Jared Dudley |
| July 9 | To Dallas Mavericks: Zaza Pachulia | To Milwaukee Bucks: Future second-round pick |
| July 9 | To Indiana Pacers: 2019 second-round pick | To Los Angeles Lakers: Roy Hibbert |
| July 10 | To Philadelphia 76ers: Carl Landry; Nik Stauskas; Jason Thompson; Future first-round pick; Rights to swap first-round picks in 2016 and 2017 | To Sacramento Kings: Rights to Artūras Gudaitis; Rights to Luka Mitrović |
| July 12 | To Indiana Pacers: Chase Budinger | To Minnesota Timberwolves: Damjan Rudež |
| July 13 | To Brooklyn Nets: Quincy Miller | To Detroit Pistons: Steve Blake |
| July 14 | To Boston Celtics: Perry Jones; 2019 second-round pick; Cash considerations | To Oklahoma City Thunder: 2018 protected second-round pick; Trade exception |
| July 14 | To Orlando Magic: Protected 2020 second-round pick (Note: Portland pick is protected #31-55) | To Portland Trail Blazers: Maurice Harkless |
| July 20 | To Denver Nuggets: Joey Dorsey; Nick Johnson; Kostas Papanikolaou; Pablo Prigioni; 2016 Houston protected first-round pick (Note: Houston pick protected #1-14); Cash considerations | To Houston Rockets: Ty Lawson; 2017 second-round pick |
| July 23 | To Cleveland Cavaliers: 2019 second-round pick | To Indiana Pacers: Rights to Rakeem Christmas |
| July 27 | To Boston Celtics: Zoran Dragić; 2020 second-round pick; Cash considerations | To Miami Heat: 2019 protected second-round pick |
| July 27 | To Boston Celtics: David Lee | To Golden State Warriors: Chris Babb; Gerald Wallace |
| July 27 | To Miami Heat: Conditional 2016 second-round pick | To Orlando Magic: Shabazz Napier; Cash considerations |
| July 27 | To Cleveland Cavaliers: Cash considerations; Two trade exceptions | To Portland Trail Blazers: Brendan Haywood; Mike Miller; 2019 second-round pick (Note: Worse of Los Angeles Lakers and Minnesota picks); 2020 Cleveland second-round pick |
| July 31 | To Golden State Warriors: Jason Thompson | To Philadelphia 76ers: Gerald Wallace; Draft considerations; Cash considerations |
November
| November 10 | To Memphis Grizzlies: Mario Chalmers; James Ennis | To Miami Heat: Jarnell Stokes; Beno Udrih |
December
| December 24 | To New Orleans Pelicans: Two future second-round picks | To Philadelphia 76ers: Ish Smith |
January
| January 12 | To Cleveland Cavaliers: 2020 Portland protected second-round pick | To Orlando Magic: Joe Harris; 2017 Sacramento protected second-round pick; Cash considerations |
| January 22 | To Houston Rockets: Josh Smith; Rights to Serhiy Lishchuk; Cash considerations | To Los Angeles Clippers: Rights to Maarty Leunen |
February
| February 16 | To Detroit Pistons: Tobias Harris | To Orlando Magic: Ersan İlyasova; Brandon Jennings |
| February 16 | Three-team trade | |
| February 16 | To Charlotte Hornets: Courtney Lee (from Memphis); Cash considerations (from Memphis) | To Memphis Grizzlies: Chris Andersen (from Miami); P. J. Hairston (from Charlotte); 2018 Charlotte second-round pick (from Charlotte); 2019 Brooklyn second-round pick (from Charlotte); Two future second-round picks (from Miami) |
| February 16 | To Miami Heat: Brian Roberts (from Charlotte) | |
| February 18 | To Miami Heat: 2018 conditional second-round pick | To New Orleans Pelicans: Jarnell Stokes; Cash considerations |
| February 18 | Three-team trade | |
| February 18 | To Atlanta Hawks: Kirk Hinrich (from Chicago) | To Chicago Bulls: Justin Holiday (from Atlanta); 2018 second-round pick (from Utah) |
| February 18 | To Utah Jazz: Shelvin Mack (from Atlanta) | |
| February 18 | To Miami Heat: Cash considerations | To Portland Trail Blazers: Brian Roberts; Future second-round pick |
| February 18 | To Phoenix Suns: DeJuan Blair; Kris Humphries; 2016 protected first-round pick | To Washington Wizards: Markieff Morris |
| February 18 | To Los Angeles Clippers: Jeff Green | To Memphis Grizzlies: Lance Stephenson; Future first-round pick |
| February 18 | To Denver Nuggets: D. J. Augustin; Steve Novak; Two future second-round picks; Cash considerations | To Oklahoma City Thunder: Randy Foye; Trade exception |
| February 18 | Three-team trade | |
| February 18 | To Orlando Magic: Jared Cunningham (from Cleveland); Future second-round pick (from Cleveland) | To Portland Trail Blazers: Anderson Varejão (from Cleveland); Future first-round pick (from Cleveland) |
| February 18 | To Cleveland Cavaliers: Channing Frye (from Orlando) | |

=== Free agency ===
Free agency negotiation started on July 1, 2015, with players being able to sign starting July 9, after the July moratorium ended. The following players, who last played for an NBA team during the 2014–15 season, were scheduled to become free agents. All players became unrestricted free agents unless indicated otherwise. A restricted free agent's team has the right to keep the player by matching an offer sheet the player signs with another team.

| Player | Date signed | New team | Former team | Ref |
|---|---|---|---|---|
| Ryan Boatright | July 2 | Brooklyn Nets | Connecticut (went undrafted in the 2015 draft) | |
| Arron Afflalo | July 9 | New York Knicks | Portland Trail Blazers | |
| Alexis Ajinça | July 9 | New Orleans Pelicans | | |
| LaMarcus Aldridge | July 9 | San Antonio Spurs | Portland Trail Blazers | |
| Al-Farouq Aminu | July 9 | Portland Trail Blazers | Dallas Mavericks | |
| Ömer Aşık | July 9 | New Orleans Pelicans | | |
| Brandon Bass | July 9 | Los Angeles Lakers | Boston Celtics | |
| Patrick Beverley (RFA) | July 9 | Houston Rockets | | |
| Jimmy Butler (RFA) | July 9 | Chicago Bulls | | |
| DeMarre Carroll | July 9 | Toronto Raptors | Atlanta Hawks | |
| Tyson Chandler | July 9 | Phoenix Suns | Dallas Mavericks | |
| Dante Cunningham | July 9 | New Orleans Pelicans | | |
| Ed Davis | July 9 | Portland Trail Blazers | Los Angeles Lakers | |
| Goran Dragić | July 9 | Miami Heat | | |
| Tim Duncan | July 9 | San Antonio Spurs | | |
| Draymond Green (RFA) | July 9 | Golden State Warriors | | |
| Gerald Green | July 9 | Miami Heat | Phoenix Suns | |
| Justin Holiday | July 9 | Atlanta Hawks | Golden State Warriors | |
| Jonas Jerebko | July 9 | Boston Celtics | | |
| Amir Johnson | July 9 | Boston Celtics | Toronto Raptors | |
| Wesley Johnson | July 9 | Los Angeles Clippers | Los Angeles Lakers | |
| DeAndre Jordan | July 9 | Los Angeles Clippers | | |
| Cory Joseph | July 9 | Toronto Raptors | San Antonio Spurs | |
| Shane Larkin | July 9 | Brooklyn Nets | New York Knicks | |
| Jeremy Lin | July 9 | Charlotte Hornets | Los Angeles Lakers | |
| Brook Lopez | July 9 | Brooklyn Nets | | |
| Robin Lopez | July 9 | New York Knicks | Portland Trail Blazers | |
| Kevin Love | July 9 | Cleveland Cavaliers | | |
| Wesley Matthews | July 9 | Dallas Mavericks | Portland Trail Blazers | |
| Khris Middleton (RFA) | July 9 | Milwaukee Bucks | | |
| Paul Millsap | July 9 | Atlanta Hawks | | |
| Greg Monroe | July 9 | Milwaukee Bucks | Detroit Pistons | |
| Gary Neal | July 9 | Washington Wizards | Minnesota Timberwolves | |
| Kyle O'Quinn (RFA) | July 9 | New York Knicks (via sign and trade) | Orlando Magic | |
| Willie Reed | July 9 | Brooklyn Nets | Metros de Santiago (Dominican Republic) | |
| Thomas Robinson | July 9 | Brooklyn Nets | Philadelphia 76ers | |
| Iman Shumpert (RFA) | July 9 | Cleveland Cavaliers | | |
| Kyle Singler (RFA) | July 9 | Oklahoma City Thunder | | |
| C. J. Watson | July 9 | Orlando Magic | Indiana Pacers | |
| Derrick Williams | July 9 | New York Knicks | Sacramento Kings | |
| Louis Williams | July 9 | Los Angeles Lakers | Toronto Raptors | |
| Brandan Wright | July 9 | Memphis Grizzlies | Phoenix Suns | |
| Thaddeus Young | July 9 | Brooklyn Nets | | |
| Wayne Ellington | July 10 | Brooklyn Nets | Los Angeles Lakers | |
| Kevin Garnett | July 10 | Minnesota Timberwolves | | |
| Joe Ingles (RFA) | July 10 | Utah Jazz | | |
| LeBron James | July 10 | Cleveland Cavaliers | | |
| Paul Pierce | July 10 | Los Angeles Clippers | Washington Wizards | |
| Amar'e Stoudemire | July 10 | Miami Heat | Dallas Mavericks | |
| Lance Thomas | July 10 | New York Knicks | | |
| Dwyane Wade | July 10 | Miami Heat | | |
| Mo Williams | July 10 | Cleveland Cavaliers | Charlotte Hornets | |
| Luis David Montero | July 11 | Portland Trail Blazers | Westchester CC (went undrafted in the 2015 draft) | |
| Alan Anderson | July 12 | Washington Wizards | Brooklyn Nets | |
| Aron Baynes | July 12 | Detroit Pistons | San Antonio Spurs | |
| Cristiano Felício | July 12 | Chicago Bulls | Flamengo (Brazil) | |
| Enes Kanter (RFA) | July 12 | Oklahoma City Thunder (matched offer sheet from Portland) | | |
| Cole Aldrich | July 13 | Los Angeles Clippers | New York Knicks | |
| Leandro Barbosa | July 13 | Golden State Warriors | | |
| Marco Belinelli | July 13 | Sacramento Kings | San Antonio Spurs | |
| Marc Gasol | July 13 | Memphis Grizzlies | | |
| Drew Gooden | July 13 | Washington Wizards | | |
| Kosta Koufos | July 13 | Sacramento Kings | Memphis Grizzlies | |
| Austin Rivers | July 13 | Los Angeles Clippers | | |
| Rajon Rondo | July 13 | Sacramento Kings | Dallas Mavericks | |
| Corey Brewer | July 14 | Houston Rockets | | |
| Aaron Brooks | July 14 | Chicago Bulls | | |
| Omri Casspi | July 14 | Sacramento Kings | | |
| Mike Dunleavy Jr. | July 14 | Chicago Bulls | | |
| Monta Ellis | July 14 | Indiana Pacers | Dallas Mavericks | |
| Danny Green | July 14 | San Antonio Spurs | | |
| Tobias Harris (RFA) | July 14 | Orlando Magic | | |
| Aaron Harrison | July 14 | Charlotte Hornets | Kentucky (went undrafted in the 2015 draft) | |
| Jordan Hill | July 14 | Indiana Pacers | Los Angeles Lakers | |
| Jason Smith | July 14 | Orlando Magic | New York Knicks | |
| Deron Williams | July 14 | Dallas Mavericks | Brooklyn Nets (waived on July 11) | |
| Matt Bonner | July 15 | San Antonio Spurs | | |
| Pierre Jackson | July 15 | Philadelphia 76ers (previously waived on September 30, 2014) | | |
| Luis Scola | July 15 | Toronto Raptors | Indiana Pacers | |
| James Anderson | July 16 | Sacramento Kings | Žalgiris Kaunas (Lithuania) | |
| José Juan Barea | July 16 | Dallas Mavericks | | |
| Alonzo Gee | July 16 | New Orleans Pelicans | Portland Trail Blazers | |
| Kawhi Leonard (RFA) | July 16 | San Antonio Spurs | | |
| Josh Smith | July 16 | Los Angeles Clippers | Houston Rockets | |
| Andrea Bargnani | July 17 | Brooklyn Nets | New York Knicks | |
| Brandon Knight (RFA) | July 17 | Phoenix Suns | | |
| Boban Marjanović | July 17 | San Antonio Spurs | Crvena zvezda (Serbia) | |
| Ronnie Price | July 17 | Phoenix Suns | Los Angeles Lakers | |
| Mirza Teletović (RFA) | July 17 | Phoenix Suns | Brooklyn Nets | |
| Sonny Weems | July 17 | Phoenix Suns | CSKA Moscow (Russia) | |
| David West | July 17 | San Antonio Spurs | Indiana Pacers | |
| Bismack Biyombo | July 18 | Toronto Raptors | Charlotte Hornets | |
| Joel Anthony | July 20 | Detroit Pistons | | |
| Luke Babbitt | July 20 | New Orleans Pelicans | | |
| Manu Ginóbili | July 20 | San Antonio Spurs | | |
| Reggie Jackson (RFA) | July 20 | Detroit Pistons | | |
| K. J. McDaniels (RFA) | July 21 | Houston Rockets | | |
| Ronald Roberts | July 21 | Toronto Raptors | San Miguel Beermen (Philippines) | |
| Rodney Stuckey | July 21 | Indiana Pacers | | |
| Quincy Acy | July 22 | Sacramento Kings | New York Knicks | |
| Seth Curry | July 22 | Sacramento Kings | Erie BayHawks (D-League) | |
| Duje Dukan | July 22 | Sacramento Kings | Wisconsin (went undrafted in the 2015 draft) | |
| Jimmer Fredette | July 22 | San Antonio Spurs | New Orleans Pelicans | |
| Tyler Hansbrough | July 22 | Charlotte Hornets | Toronto Raptors | |
| Jonathon Simmons | July 22 | San Antonio Spurs | Austin Spurs (D-League) | |
| Caron Butler | July 23 | Sacramento Kings | Milwaukee Bucks (waived on June 30) | |
| Michale Kyser | July 23 | Toronto Raptors | Louisiana Tech (went undrafted in the 2015 draft) | |
| Maurice Ndour | July 23 | Dallas Mavericks | Ohio (went undrafted in the 2015 draft) | |
| Adonis Thomas | July 23 | Detroit Pistons | Grand Rapids Drive (D-League) | |
| Axel Toupane | July 23 | Toronto Raptors | Strasbourg IG (France) | |
| Cliff Alexander | July 24 | Portland Trail Blazers | Kansas (went undrafted in the 2015 draft) | |
| Jarrid Famous | July 24 | Dallas Mavericks | GlobalPort Batang Pier (Philippines) | |
| John Jenkins | July 24 | Dallas Mavericks | Atlanta Hawks | |
| Terran Petteway | July 24 | Atlanta Hawks | Nebraska (went undrafted in the 2015 draft) | |
| Phil Pressey | July 24 | Portland Trail Blazers | Boston Celtics (waived on July 15) | |
| Scottie Wilbekin | July 24 | Philadelphia 76ers | Cairns Taipans (Australia) | |
| James Jones | July 25 | Cleveland Cavaliers | | |
| Marcus Thornton | July 25 | Houston Rockets | Phoenix Suns | |
| Lavoy Allen | July 27 | Indiana Pacers | | |
| Brandon Ashley | July 27 | Dallas Mavericks | Arizona (went undrafted in the 2015 draft) | |
| Jae Crowder (RFA) | July 27 | Boston Celtics | | |
| Matthew Dellavedova (RFA) | July 27 | Cleveland Cavaliers | | |
| Glenn Robinson | July 27 | Indiana Pacers | Philadelphia 76ers | |
| Shayne Whittington | July 27 | Indiana Pacers | | |
| Jamil Wilson | July 27 | Dallas Mavericks | Bakersfield Jam (D-League) | |
| Kendrick Perkins | July 28 | New Orleans Pelicans | Cleveland Cavaliers | |
| Elliot Williams | July 28 | Charlotte Hornets | Santa Cruz Warriors (D-League) | |
| Chris Copeland | July 29 | Milwaukee Bucks | Indiana Pacers | |
| Lou Amundson | July 30 | New York Knicks | | |
| Salah Mejri | July 30 | Dallas Mavericks | Real Madrid (Spain) | |
| Jeremy Evans | July 31 | Dallas Mavericks | Utah Jazz | |
| Andre Miller | August 3 | Minnesota Timberwolves | Sacramento Kings | |
| Melvin Ejim | August 4 | Orlando Magic | Medi Bayreuth (Germany) | |
| Pablo Prigioni | August 4 | Los Angeles Clippers | Denver Nuggets (waived on July 20) | |
| Richard Jefferson | August 5 | Cleveland Cavaliers | Dallas Mavericks | |
| Samuel Dalembert | August 6 | Dallas Mavericks | New York Knicks (waived on January 5, 2015) | |
| Kevin Séraphin | August 6 | New York Knicks | Washington Wizards | |
| Charlie Villanueva | August 6 | Dallas Mavericks | | |
| Darrell Arthur | August 7 | Denver Nuggets | | |
| Will Barton (RFA) | August 7 | Denver Nuggets | | |
| Jameer Nelson | August 7 | Denver Nuggets | | |
| Sasha Vujačić | August 7 | New York Knicks | İstanbul BB (Turkey) | |
| Donald Sloan | August 10 | Brooklyn Nets | Indiana Pacers | |
| Toney Douglas | August 11 | Indiana Pacers | New Orleans Pelicans (waived on July 31) | |
| Jonathan Holmes | August 13 | Los Angeles Lakers | Texas (went undrafted in the 2015 draft) | |
| JaVale McGee | August 13 | Dallas Mavericks | Philadelphia 76ers | |
| Treveon Graham | August 17 | Utah Jazz | VCU (went undrafted in the 2015 draft) | |
| Marcus Landry | August 17 | Milwaukee Bucks | CAI Zaragoza (Spain) | |
| Jason Richardson | August 18 | Atlanta Hawks | Philadelphia 76ers | |
| Bryce Dejean-Jones | August 20 | New Orleans Pelicans | Iowa State (went undrafted in the 2015 draft) | |
| Tayshaun Prince | August 20 | Minnesota Timberwolves | Detroit Pistons | |
| Corey Hawkins | August 21 | Miami Heat | UC Davis (went undrafted in the 2015 draft) | |
| Shannon Scott | August 21 | Toronto Raptors | Ohio State (went undrafted in the 2015 draft) | |
| Jason Terry | August 24 | Houston Rockets | | |
| Jeff Withey | August 24 | Utah Jazz | New Orleans Pelicans | |
| Keith Benson | August 25 | Miami Heat | BC Kalev/Cramo (Estonia) | |
| Michael Frazier | August 25 | Los Angeles Lakers | Florida (went undrafted in the 2015 draft) | |
| J. J. O'Brien | August 28 | Utah Jazz | San Diego State (went undrafted in the 2015 draft) | |
| Chuck Hayes | August 31 | Los Angeles Clippers | Toronto Raptors | |
| J. R. Smith | September 2 | Cleveland Cavaliers | | |
| Greg Whittington | September 3 | Miami Heat | Georgetown (went undrafted in the 2015 draft) | |
| Remi Yusuf | September 5 | Houston Rockets | SKP Banská Bystrica (Slovakia) | |
| Marcelo Huertas | September 9 | Los Angeles Lakers | FC Barcelona Lassa (Spain) | |
| Vince Hunter | September 9 | Sacramento Kings | UTEP (went undrafted in the 2015 draft) | |
| Kendall Marshall | September 9 | Philadelphia 76ers | Phoenix Suns | |
| Eric Moreland | September 9 | Sacramento Kings (previously waived on July 29) | | |
| Darion Atkins | September 10 | New York Knicks | Virginia (went undrafted in the 2015 draft) | |
| Dahntay Jones | September 10 | Brooklyn Nets | Los Angeles Clippers | |
| Sean Kilpatrick | September 10 | New Orleans Pelicans | Delaware 87ers (D-League) | |
| Wesley Saunders | September 10 | New York Knicks | Harvard (went undrafted in the 2015 draft) | |
| Robert Upshaw | September 14 | Los Angeles Lakers | Washington (went undrafted in the 2015 draft) | |
| C. J. Fair | September 15 | Indiana Pacers | Fort Wayne Mad Ants (D-League) | |
| Sam Thompson | September 15 | Charlotte Hornets | Ohio State (went undrafted in the 2015 draft) | |
| Jason Washburn | September 15 | Charlotte Hornets | Excelsior Brussels (Belgium) | |
| Deonte Burton | September 16 | Phoenix Suns | Ratiopharm Ulm (Germany) | |
| Patrick Christopher | September 16 | Memphis Grizzlies | Utah Jazz (waived on January 6) | |
| Kyle Casey | September 16 | Phoenix Suns | Helios Suns Domžale (Slovenia) | |
| Cory Jefferson | September 16 | Phoenix Suns | Brooklyn Nets (waived on July 13) | |
| Henry Sims | September 16 | Phoenix Suns | Philadelphia 76ers | |
| Terrico White | September 16 | Phoenix Suns | Yenisey Krasnoyarsk (Russia) | |
| Norris Cole (RFA) | September 17 | New Orleans Pelicans (signed qualifying offer) | | |
| Justin Harper | September 18 | Brooklyn Nets | S.S. Felice Scandone (Italy) | |
| Marshall Henderson | September 18 | Sacramento Kings | Naft Al-Janoob (Iraq) | |
| Jon Horford | September 18 | Milwaukee Bucks | Indios de San Francisco de Macorís (Dominican Republic) | |
| Kleon Penn | September 18 | Minnesota Timberwolves | Vaqueros de Bayamón (Puerto Rico) | |
| Josh Powell | September 18 | Milwaukee Bucks | Houston Rockets (waived on October 24, 2014) | |
| Charlie Westbrook | September 18 | Milwaukee Bucks | Hyères-Toulon (France) | |
| Nick Wiggins | September 18 | Minnesota Timberwolves | Idaho Stampede (D-League) | |
| Will Cummings | September 21 | Houston Rockets | Temple (went undrafted in the 2015 draft) | |
| Denzel Livingston | September 21 | Houston Rockets | Incarnate Word (went undrafted in the 2015 draft) | |
| Joshua Smith | September 21 | Houston Rockets | Georgetown (went undrafted in the 2015 draft) | |
| Chris Walker | September 21 | Houston Rockets | Florida (went undrafted in the 2015 draft) | |
| DaJuan Summers | September 22 | New York Knicks | Gran Canaria (Spain) | |
| Travis Trice | September 22 | New York Knicks | Michigan State (went undrafted in the 2015 draft) | |
| Jeff Adrien | September 23 | New Orleans Pelicans | Guangdong Southern Tigers (China) | |
| Chris Daniels | September 23 | Brooklyn Nets | Guangdong Southern Tigers (China) | |
| Chris Douglas-Roberts | September 23 | New Orleans Pelicans | Boston Celtics | |
| Corey Webster | September 23 | New Orleans Pelicans | New Zealand Breakers (Australia) | |
| Keith Appling | September 24 | Orlando Magic | Erie BayHawks (D-League) | |
| Nnanna Egwu | September 24 | Orlando Magic | Illinois (went undrafted in the 2015 draft) | |
| Jordan Sibert | September 24 | Orlando Magic | Dayton (went undrafted in the 2015 draft) | |
| Greg Stiemsma | September 24 | Orlando Magic | Toronto Raptors | |
| Metta World Peace | September 24 | Los Angeles Lakers | Pallacanestro Cantù (Italy) | |
| Earl Barron | September 25 | Atlanta Hawks | Phoenix Suns | |
| Ian Clark | September 25 | Golden State Warriors | Denver Nuggets | |
| Coty Clarke | September 25 | Boston Celtics | Hapoel Kazrin (Israel) | |
| Jarell Eddie | September 25 | Golden State Warriors | Austin Spurs (D-League) | |
| Josh Harrellson | September 25 | Washington Wizards | Brujos de Guayama (Puerto Rico) | |
| Jaron Johnson | September 25 | Washington Wizards | Rio Grande Valley Vipers (D-League) | |
| Omari Johnson | September 25 | Portland Trail Blazers | Maine Red Claws (D-League) | |
| DeQuan Jones | September 25 | Atlanta Hawks | Pallacanestro Cantù (Italy) | |
| Luc Mbah a Moute (Note: Mbah a Moute signed with the Sacramento Kings on July 14, but the Kings voided his contract on July 16 after he failed his physical examination.) | September 25 | Los Angeles Clippers | Philadelphia 76ers | |
| Malcolm Miller | September 25 | Boston Celtics | Holy Cross (went undrafted in the 2015 draft) | |
| Tony Mitchell | September 25 | Golden State Warriors | Atléticos de San Germán (Puerto Rico) | |
| Toure' Murry | September 25 | Washington Wizards | Rio Grande Valley Vipers (D-League) | |
| Levi Randolph | September 25 | Boston Celtics | Alabama (went undrafted in the 2015 draft) | |
| Jaleel Roberts | September 25 | Washington Wizards | UNC Asheville (went undrafted in the 2015 draft) | |
| Ish Smith | September 25 | Washington Wizards | Philadelphia 76ers | |
| Édgar Sosa | September 25 | Atlanta Hawks | Dinamo Sassari (Italy) | |
| Juwan Staten | September 25 | Golden State Warriors | West Virginia (went undrafted in the 2015 draft) | |
| Julyan Stone | September 25 | Oklahoma City Thunder | Umana Reyer Venezia (Italy) | |
| Nikoloz Tskitishvili | September 25 | Los Angeles Clippers | Champville (Lebanon) | |
| Corey Walden | September 25 | Boston Celtics | Eastern Kentucky (went undrafted in the 2015 draft) | |
| Dez Wells | September 25 | Oklahoma City Thunder | Maryland (went undrafted in the 2015 draft) | |
| Talib Zanna | September 25 | Oklahoma City Thunder | Oklahoma City Blue (D-League) | |
| T. J. McConnell | September 27 | Philadelphia 76ers | Arizona (went undrafted in the 2015 draft) | |
| Christian Wood | September 27 | Philadelphia 76ers | UNLV (went undrafted in the 2015 draft) | |
| Jake Anderson | September 28 | Chicago Bulls | Gateway Steam (MPBA) | |
| Jordan Bachynski | September 28 | Detroit Pistons | Westchester Knicks (D-League) | |
| Anthony Bennett | September 28 | Toronto Raptors | Minnesota Timberwolves (waived on September 23) | |
| Rasual Butler | September 28 | San Antonio Spurs | Washington Wizards | |
| Quinn Cook | September 28 | Cleveland Cavaliers | Duke (went undrafted in the 2015 draft) | |
| Jordan Crawford | September 28 | Chicago Bulls | Fort Wayne Mad Ants (D-League) | |
| Jared Cunningham | September 28 | Cleveland Cavaliers | Idaho Stampede (D-League) | |
| Austin Daye | September 28 | Cleveland Cavaliers | Atlanta Hawks (waived on July 9) | |
| Yakhouba Diawara | September 28 | Memphis Grizzlies | Pallacanestro Varese (Italy) | |
| Michael Dunigan | September 28 | Cleveland Cavaliers | Canton Charge (D-League) | |
| Ben Gordon | September 28 | Golden State Warriors | Orlando Magic (waived on June 29) | |
| Eric Griffin | September 28 | Detroit Pistons | Leones de Ponce (Puerto Rico) | |
| Ryan Hollins | September 28 | Memphis Grizzlies | Sacramento Kings | |
| Michael Holyfield | September 28 | Memphis Grizzlies | Sam Houston State (went undrafted in the 2015 draft) | |
| Matt Janning | September 28 | Denver Nuggets | Anadolu Efes (Turkey) | |
| Chris Johnson | September 28 | Cleveland Cavaliers | Türk Telekom (Turkey) | |
| Lazeric Jones | September 28 | Memphis Grizzlies | Szolnoki Olaj (Hungary) | |
| Tre Kelley | September 28 | Miami Heat | Pertevniyal (Turkey) | |
| John Lucas | September 28 | Miami Heat | Detroit Pistons | |
| Nick Minnerath | September 28 | Cleveland Cavaliers | Cholet Basket (France) | |
| Youssou Ndoye | September 28 | San Antonio Spurs | St. Bonaventure (went undrafted in the 2015 draft) | |
| Dan Nwaelele | September 28 | Memphis Grizzlies | Santa Cruz Warriors (D-League) | |
| Oleksiy Pecherov | September 28 | Denver Nuggets | BC Kalev/Cramo (Estonia) | |
| Marcus Simmons | September 28 | Chicago Bulls | Fort Wayne Mad Ants (D-League) | |
| D. J. Stephens | September 28 | Cleveland Cavaliers | Zenit Saint Petersburg (Russia) | |
| Devin Sweetney | September 28 | Denver Nuggets | Huracanes del Atlántico (Dominican Republic) | |
| Keifer Sykes | September 28 | San Antonio Spurs | Green Bay (went undrafted in the 2015 draft) | |
| Jeremy Tyler | September 28 | Houston Rockets | Shanxi Zhongyu (China) | |
| Michael Qualls | September 29 | Oklahoma City Thunder | Arkansas (went undrafted in the 2015 draft) | |
| Mike Miller | September 30 | Denver Nuggets | Portland Trail Blazers (waived on September 28) | |
| Stefhon Hannah | October 1 | Chicago Bulls | Grand Rapids Drive (D-League) | |
| Sampson Carter | October 6 | Memphis Grizzlies | Club Virgilio Castillo Chola (Dominican Republic) | |
| Kadeem Jack | October 7 | Indiana Pacers | Rutgers (went undrafted in the 2015 draft) | |
| Alex Stepheson | October 7 | Memphis Grizzlies | İstanbul BB (Turkey) | |
| Dionte Christmas | October 10 | Cleveland Cavaliers | Paris-Levallois (France) | |
| Jerome Jordan | October 11 | New Orleans Pelicans | Brooklyn Nets | |
| Arsalan Kazemi | October 12 | Houston Rockets (claimed off waivers) | Atlanta Hawks (waived on October 10) | |
| Mirza Begić | October 14 | New Orleans Pelicans | Laboral Kutxa (Spain) | |
| Bo McCalebb | October 15 | New Orleans Pelicans | Bayern Munich (Germany) | |
| Nate Robinson | October 16 | New Orleans Pelicans | Los Angeles Clippers | |
| Damien Wilkins | October 16 | Charlotte Hornets | Indios de Mayagüez (Puerto Rico) | |
| Jack Cooley | October 17 | Cleveland Cavaliers | Utah Jazz (waived on October 13) | |
| Xavier Henry | October 19 | Golden State Warriors | Los Angeles Lakers (waived on December 28, 2014) | |
| Brianté Weber | October 19 | Miami Heat | VCU (went undrafted in the 2015 draft) | |
| Chris Udofia | October 19 | Golden State Warriors | Elitzur Yavne (Israel) | |
| E. J. Singler | October 21 | Utah Jazz | BC Kalev/Cramo (Estonia) | |
| Michael Cobbins | October 22 | Oklahoma City Thunder | Oklahoma State (went undrafted in the 2015 draft) | |
| Mustapha Farrakhan Jr. | October 22 | Oklahoma City Thunder | Melbourne Tigers (Australia) | |
| Tu Holloway | October 22 | Dallas Mavericks | Mets de Guaynabo (Puerto Rico) | |
| Tristan Thompson (RFA) | October 22 | Cleveland Cavaliers | | |
| Julian Washburn | October 22 | San Antonio Spurs | UTEP (went undrafted in the 2015 draft) | |
| Ryan Boatright | October 23 | Detroit Pistons | Brooklyn Nets (waived on October 20) | |
| Eric Atkins | October 25 | Utah Jazz | Falco KC Szombathely (Hungary) | |
| Phil Pressey | October 25 | Utah Jazz (claimed off waivers) | Portland Trail Blazers (waived on October 23) | |
| Terran Petteway | October 25 | Indiana Pacers | Atlanta Hawks (waived on October 22) | |
| Jordan Railey | October 26 | Philadelphia 76ers | KK Igokea (Bosnia and Herzegovina) | |
| Ish Smith | October 26 | New Orleans Pelicans (claimed off waivers) | Washington Wizards (waived on October 24) | |
| Toney Douglas | October 30 | New Orleans Pelicans | Indiana Pacers (waived on October 26) | |
| Chuck Hayes | November 1 | Houston Rockets | Los Angeles Clippers (waived on October 24) | |
| Phil Pressey | November 4 | Philadelphia 76ers | Idaho Stampede (D-League) | |
| Kostas Papanikolaou | November 5 | Denver Nuggets (previously waived on September 25) | | |
| Jimmer Fredette | November 10 | New Orleans Pelicans | Westchester Knicks (D-League) | |
| Bryce Cotton | November 25 | Phoenix Suns | Austin Spurs (D-League) | |
| Ryan Hollins | November 30 | Washington Wizards | Memphis Grizzlies (waived on October 26) | |
| Jarell Eddie | December 23 | Washington Wizards | Austin Spurs (D-League) | |
| Ryan Hollins | December 29 | Memphis Grizzlies | Washington Wizards (waived on December 23) | |
| Elton Brand | January 4 | Philadelphia 76ers (came out of retirement) | Atlanta Hawks | |
| Lorenzo Brown | January 8 | Phoenix Suns (10-day contract) | Grand Rapids Drive (D-League) | |
| Elliot Williams | January 8 | Memphis Grizzlies (10-day contract) | Santa Cruz Warriors (D-League) | |
| Sean Kilpatrick | January 12 | Denver Nuggets (10-day contract) | Delaware 87ers (D-League) | |
| J. J. O'Brien | January 16 | Utah Jazz (10-day contract) | Idaho Stampede (D-League) | |
| Keith Appling | January 18 | Orlando Magic (10-day contract) | Erie BayHawks (D-League) | |
| Lorenzo Brown | January 18 | Phoenix Suns (second 10-day contract) | | |
| Bryce Dejean-Jones | January 21 | New Orleans Pelicans (10-day contract) | Idaho Stampede (D-League) | |
| Ryan Hollins | January 21 | Memphis Grizzlies (10-day contract, previously waived on January 7) | | |
| Cory Jefferson | January 21 | Phoenix Suns (10-day contract) | Bakersfield Jam (D-League) | |
| Jeff Ayres | January 23 | Los Angeles Clippers (10-day contract) | Idaho Stampede (D-League) | |
| Sean Kilpatrick | January 23 | Denver Nuggets (second 10-day contract) | | |
| Erick Green | January 26 | Utah Jazz (10-day contract) | Reno Bighorns (D-League) | |
| Thanasis Antetokounmpo | January 29 | New York Knicks (10-day contract) | Westchester Knicks (D-League) | |
| Keith Appling | January 29 | Orlando Magic (second 10-day contract) | | |
| Jordan McRae | January 29 | Phoenix Suns (10-day contract) | Delaware 87ers (D-League) | |
| Bryce Dejean-Jones | February 1 | New Orleans Pelicans (second 10-day contract) | | |
| Ryan Hollins | February 1 | Memphis Grizzlies (second 10-day contract) | | |
| Jeff Ayres | February 2 | Los Angeles Clippers (second 10-day contract) | | |
| Erick Green | February 5 | Utah Jazz (second 10-day contract) | | |
| Orlando Johnson | February 5 | Phoenix Suns (10-day contract) | Austin Spurs (D-League) | |
| Jordan McRae | February 8 | Phoenix Suns (second 10-day contract) | | |
| Bryce Dejean-Jones | February 19 | New Orleans Pelicans (signed for rest of season) | | |
| Jorge Gutiérrez | February 20 | Charlotte Hornets (10-day contract) | Canton Charge (D-League) | |
| Phil Pressey | February 20 | Phoenix Suns (10-day contract) | Idaho Stampede (D-League) | |
| Alex Stepheson | February 20 | Los Angeles Clippers (10-day contract) | Iowa Energy (D-League) | |
| Jimmer Fredette | February 22 | New York Knicks (10-day contract) | Westchester Knicks (D-League) | |
| David Lee | February 22 | Dallas Mavericks | Boston Celtics (waived on February 19) | |
| Steve Novak | February 22 | Milwaukee Bucks | Denver Nuggets (waived on February 19) | |
| JaKarr Sampson | February 22 | Denver Nuggets | Philadelphia 76ers (waived on February 18) | |
| Anderson Varejão | February 22 | Golden State Warriors | Portland Trail Blazers (waived on February 18) | |
| Chris Copeland | February 24 | Orlando Magic (claimed off waivers) | Milwaukee Bucks (waived on February 22) | |
| Justin Harper | February 24 | Detroit Pistons (10-day contract) | Los Angeles D-Fenders (D-League) | |
| John Jenkins | February 24 | Phoenix Suns (claimed off waivers) | Dallas Mavericks (waived on February 22) | |
| JJ Hickson | February 25 | Washington Wizards | Denver Nuggets (waived on February 19) | |
| Joe Johnson | February 27 | Miami Heat | Brooklyn Nets (waived on February 25) | |
| Sean Kilpatrick | February 28 | Brooklyn Nets (10-day contract) | Delaware 87ers (D-League) | |
| Jordan McRae | February 28 | Cleveland Cavaliers (10-day contract) | Delaware 87ers (D-League) | |
| Andre Miller | February 29 | San Antonio Spurs | Minnesota Timberwolves (waived on February 25) | |
| Jorge Gutiérrez | March 1 | Charlotte Hornets (second 10-day contract) | | |
| Kris Humphries | March 1 | Atlanta Hawks | Phoenix Suns (waived on February 28) | |
| Phil Pressey | March 1 | Phoenix Suns (second 10-day contract) | | |
| Jason Thompson | March 1 | Toronto Raptors | Golden State Warriors (waived on February 22) | |
| Ryan Hollins | March 2 | Memphis Grizzlies (signed for rest of season) | | |
| Greg Smith | March 2 | Minnesota Timberwolves (10-day contract) | Raptors 905 (D-League) | |
| Alex Stepheson | March 2 | Los Angeles Clippers (second 10-day contract) | | |
| Axel Toupane | March 3 | Denver Nuggets (10-day contract) | Raptors 905 (D-League) | |
| Michael Beasley | March 4 | Houston Rockets | Shandong Golden Stars (China) | |
| Christian Wood | March 4 | Philadelphia 76ers (10-day contract) | Delaware 87ers (D-League) | |
| Justin Harper | March 5 | Detroit Pistons (second 10-day contract) | | |
| Nazr Mohammed | March 5 | Oklahoma City Thunder (came out of retirement) | Chicago Bulls | |
| Coty Clarke | March 7 | Boston Celtics (10-day contract) | Maine Red Claws (D-League) | |
| Ty Lawson | March 7 | Indiana Pacers | Houston Rockets (waived on March 1) | |
| Sonny Weems | March 7 | Philadelphia 76ers (claimed off waivers) | Phoenix Suns (waived on March 5) | |
| Chase Budinger | March 8 | Phoenix Suns | Indiana Pacers (waived on March 5) | |
| Alan Williams | March 8 | Phoenix Suns (10-day contract) | Qingdao DoubleStar Eagles (China) | |
| Andrew Goudelock | March 9 | Houston Rockets | Xinjiang Flying Tigers (China) | |
| Orlando Johnson | March 9 | New Orleans Pelicans (10-day contract) | Austin Spurs (D-League) | |
| Sean Kilpatrick | March 9 | Brooklyn Nets (second 10-day contract) | | |
| Kevin Martin | March 9 | San Antonio Spurs | Minnesota Timberwolves (waived on March 1) | |
| Jordan McRae | March 9 | Cleveland Cavaliers (signed for rest of season) | | |
| Marcus Thornton | March 9 | Washington Wizards | Houston Rockets (waived on February 26) | |
| Jorge Gutiérrez | March 11 | Charlotte Hornets (signed for rest of season) | | |
| Brianté Weber | March 11 | Memphis Grizzlies (10-day contract) | Sioux Falls Skyforce (D-League) | |
| Ray McCallum Jr. | March 12 | Memphis Grizzlies (10-day contract) | San Antonio Spurs (waived on February 29) | |
| Greg Smith | March 12 | Minnesota Timberwolves (second 10-day contract) | | |
| Alex Stepheson | March 12 | Memphis Grizzlies (10-day contract) | Los Angeles Clippers (second 10-day contract expired) | |
| Axel Toupane | March 14 | Denver Nuggets (second 10-day contract) | | |
| Jeff Ayres | March 16 | Los Angeles Clippers (signed for rest of season) | Los Angeles D-Fenders (D-League) | |
| Jared Cunningham | March 16 | Milwaukee Bucks (10-day contract) | Idaho Stampede (D-League) | |
| Tim Frazier | March 16 | New Orleans Pelicans (10-day contract) | Maine Red Claws (D-League) | |
| Xavier Munford | March 16 | Memphis Grizzlies (10-day contract) | Bakersfield Jam (D-League) | |
| Tony Wroten | March 16 | New York Knicks | Philadelphia 76ers (waived on December 24) | |
| Henry Sims | March 17 | Brooklyn Nets (10-day contract) | Grand Rapids Drive (D-League) | |
| Lorenzo Brown | March 18 | Detroit Pistons (10-day contract) | Grand Rapids Drive (D-League) | |
| Coty Clarke | March 18 | Boston Celtics (second 10-day contract) | | |
| Alan Williams | March 18 | Phoenix Suns (signed for rest of season) | | |
| Sean Kilpatrick | March 19 | Brooklyn Nets (signed for rest of season) | | |
| Jordan Farmar | March 21 | Memphis Grizzlies (10-day contract) | Maccabi Tel Aviv (Israel) (waived on January 10) | |
| Ray McCallum Jr. | March 22 | Memphis Grizzlies (second 10-day contract) | | |
| Greg Smith | March 23 | Minnesota Timberwolves (signed for rest of season) | | |
| Jordan Hamilton | March 25 | New Orleans Pelicans (10-day contract) | Rio Grande Valley Vipers (D-League) | |
| Axel Toupane | March 25 | Denver Nuggets (signed for rest of season) | | |
| Tim Frazier | March 26 | New Orleans Pelicans (signed for rest of season) | | |
| Xavier Munford | March 27 | Memphis Grizzlies (second 10-day contract) | | |
| Henry Sims | March 27 | Brooklyn Nets (second 10-day contract) | | |
| Christian Wood | March 27 | Philadelphia 76ers (10-day contract) | Delaware 87ers (D-League) | |
| Lorenzo Brown | March 28 | Detroit Pistons (second 10-day contract) | | |
| James Ennis | March 30 | New Orleans Pelicans (10-day contract) | Iowa Energy (D-League) | |
| Jordan Farmar | March 31 | Memphis Grizzlies (signed for rest of season) | | |
| Bryce Cotton | April 1 | Memphis Grizzlies (10-day contract) | Xinjiang Flying Tigers (China) | |
| Jordan Hamilton | April 4 | New Orleans Pelicans (signed for rest of season) | | |
| Henry Sims | April 6 | Brooklyn Nets (signed for rest of season) | | |
| Xavier Munford | April 7 | Memphis Grizzlies (signed for rest of season) | | |
| Christian Wood | April 7 | Philadelphia 76ers (signed for rest of season) | | |
| James Ennis | April 9 | New Orleans Pelicans (signed for rest of season) | | |
| Brianté Weber | April 10 | Miami Heat | Sioux Falls Skyforce (D-League) | |
| Bryce Cotton | April 11 | Memphis Grizzlies (signed for rest of regular season) | | |
| John Holland | April 11 | Boston Celtics | Canton Charge (D-League) | |
| Dorell Wright | April 12 | Miami Heat | Beikong Fly Dragons (China) | |
| Lorenzo Brown | April 13 | Detroit Pistons (signed for rest of season) | | |
| Dahntay Jones | April 13 | Cleveland Cavaliers | Grand Rapids Drive (D-League) | |
| Carlos Boozer | | | Los Angeles Lakers | |
| Glen Davis | | | Los Angeles Clippers | |
| Reggie Evans | | | Sacramento Kings | |
| Landry Fields | | | Toronto Raptors | |
| Willie Green | | | Orlando Magic | |
| Ray McCallum Jr. | | | Memphis Grizzlies | |

* Player option
** Team option
*** Early termination option

=== Going to other North American leagues ===
| * | Denotes D-League players who returned to their former team |

| Player | Date signed | New team | New league | NBA team | NBA contract status | Ref |
|---|---|---|---|---|---|---|
| C. J. Fair* | October 29 | Fort Wayne Mad Ants | D-League | Indiana Pacers | Unrestricted free agent | |
| Kadeem Jack | October 29 | Fort Wayne Mad Ants | D-League | Indiana Pacers | Unrestricted free agent | |
| Terran Petteway | October 29 | Fort Wayne Mad Ants | D-League | Indiana Pacers | Unrestricted free agent | |
| Marcus Simmons* | October 29 | Fort Wayne Mad Ants | D-League | Chicago Bulls | Unrestricted free agent | |
| Quinn Cook | October 30 | Canton Charge | D-League | Cleveland Cavaliers | Unrestricted free agent | |
| Bryce Cotton* | October 30 | Austin Spurs | D-League | Utah Jazz | Unrestricted free agent | |
| Michael Dunigan* | October 30 | Canton Charge | D-League | Cleveland Cavaliers | Unrestricted free agent | |
| Jarell Eddie* | October 30 | Austin Spurs | D-League | Golden State Warriors | Unrestricted free agent | |
| Cady Lalanne | October 30 | Austin Spurs | D-League | San Antonio Spurs | Unsigned draft pick | |
| Nick Minnerath | October 30 | Canton Charge | D-League | Cleveland Cavaliers | Unrestricted free agent | |
| Youssou Ndoye | October 30 | Austin Spurs | D-League | San Antonio Spurs | Unrestricted free agent | |
| Sir'Dominic Pointer | October 30 | Canton Charge | D-League | Cleveland Cavaliers | Unsigned draft pick | |
| D. J. Stephens | October 30 | Canton Charge | D-League | Cleveland Cavaliers | Unrestricted free agent | |
| Deshaun Thomas | October 30 | Austin Spurs | D-League | San Antonio Spurs | Unrestricted free agent | |
| Julian Washburn | October 30 | Austin Spurs | D-League | San Antonio Spurs | Unrestricted free agent | |
| Keith Appling* | October 31 | Erie BayHawks | D-League | Orlando Magic | Unrestricted free agent | |
| Brandon Ashley | October 31 | Texas Legends | D-League | Dallas Mavericks | Unrestricted free agent | |
| Jeff Ayres | October 31 | Idaho Stampede | D-League | San Antonio Spurs | Unrestricted free agent | |
| Vander Blue* | October 31 | Los Angeles D-Fenders | D-League | Los Angeles Lakers | Unrestricted free agent | |
| Ryan Boatright | October 31 | Grand Rapids Drive | D-League | Detroit Pistons | Unrestricted free agent | |
| Sampson Carter | October 31 | Canton Charge | D-League | Memphis Grizzlies | Unrestricted free agent | |
| Patrick Christopher* | October 31 | Iowa Energy | D-League | Memphis Grizzlies | Unrestricted free agent | |
| Coty Clarke | October 31 | Maine Red Claws | D-League | Boston Celtics | Unrestricted free agent | |
| Nnanna Egwu | October 31 | Erie BayHawks | D-League | Orlando Magic | Unrestricted free agent | |
| Melvin Ejim | October 31 | Erie BayHawks | D-League | Orlando Magic | Unrestricted free agent | |
| Michael Frazier II | October 31 | Los Angeles D-Fenders | D-League | Los Angeles Lakers | Unrestricted free agent | |
| Jimmer Fredette | October 31 | Westchester Knicks | D-League | San Antonio Spurs | Unrestricted free agent | |
| Stefhon Hannah* | October 31 | Grand Rapids Drive | D-League | Chicago Bulls | Unrestricted free agent | |
| Andrew Harrison | October 31 | Iowa Energy | D-League | Memphis Grizzlies | Unsigned draft pick | |
| Tyler Harvey | October 31 | Erie BayHawks | D-League | Orlando Magic | Unsigned draft pick | |
| Tu Holloway | October 31 | Texas Legends | D-League | Dallas Mavericks | Unrestricted free agent | |
| Michael Holyfield | October 31 | Iowa Energy | D-League | Memphis Grizzlies | Unrestricted free agent | |
| Omari Johnson* | October 31 | Maine Red Claws | D-League | Portland Trail Blazers | Unrestricted free agent | |
| Lazeric Jones | October 31 | Iowa Energy | D-League | Memphis Grizzlies | Unrestricted free agent | |
| Perry Jones | October 31 | Iowa Energy | D-League | Boston Celtics | Unrestricted free agent | |
| Michale Kyser | October 31 | Raptors 905 | D-League | Toronto Raptors | Unrestricted free agent | |
| Cartier Martin | October 31 | Iowa Energy | D-League | Detroit Pistons | Unrestricted free agent | |
| Malcolm Miller | October 31 | Maine Red Claws | D-League | Boston Celtics | Unrestricted free agent | |
| Toure' Murry | October 31 | Texas Legends | D-League | Washington Wizards | Unrestricted free agent | |
| Levi Randolph | October 31 | Maine Red Claws | D-League | Boston Celtics | Unrestricted free agent | |
| Shannon Scott | October 31 | Raptors 905 | D-League | Toronto Raptors | Unrestricted free agent | |
| Jordan Sibert | October 31 | Erie BayHawks | D-League | Orlando Magic | Unrestricted free agent | |
| Satnam Singh | October 31 | Texas Legends | D-League | Dallas Mavericks | Unsigned draft pick | |
| Alex Stepheson | October 31 | Iowa Energy | D-League | Memphis Grizzlies | Unrestricted free agent | |
| Adonis Thomas* | October 31 | Grand Rapids Drive | D-League | Detroit Pistons | Unrestricted free agent | |
| Sam Thompson | October 31 | Grand Rapids Drive | D-League | Charlotte Hornets | Unrestricted free agent | |
| J. P. Tokoto | October 31 | Oklahoma City Blue | D-League | Philadelphia 76ers | Unrestricted free agent | |
| Axel Toupane | October 31 | Raptors 905 | D-League | Toronto Raptors | Unrestricted free agent | |
| Robert Upshaw | October 31 | Los Angeles D-Fenders | D-League | Los Angeles Lakers | Unrestricted free agent | |
| Corey Walden | October 31 | Maine Red Claws | D-League | Boston Celtics | Unrestricted free agent | |
| Eric Atkins | November 1 | Idaho Stampede | D-League | Utah Jazz | Unrestricted free agent | |
| Treveon Graham | November 1 | Idaho Stampede | D-League | Utah Jazz | Unrestricted free agent | |
| J. J. O'Brien | November 1 | Idaho Stampede | D-League | Utah Jazz | Unrestricted free agent | |
| Phil Pressey | November 1 | Idaho Stampede | D-League | Utah Jazz | Unrestricted free agent | |
| E. J. Singler* | November 1 | Idaho Stampede | D-League | Utah Jazz | Unrestricted free agent | |
| Nick Wiggins* | November 1 | Idaho Stampede | D-League | Minnesota Timberwolves | Unrestricted free agent | |
| Thanasis Antetokounmpo* | November 2 | Westchester Knicks | D-League | New York Knicks | Unrestricted free agent | |
| Darion Atkins | November 2 | Westchester Knicks | D-League | New York Knicks | Unrestricted free agent | |
| Jordan Bachynski* | November 2 | Westchester Knicks | D-League | Detroit Pistons | Unrestricted free agent | |
| Keith Benson* | November 2 | Sioux Falls Skyforce | D-League | Miami Heat | Unrestricted free agent | |
| Deonte Burton | November 2 | Bakersfield Jam | D-League | Phoenix Suns | Unrestricted free agent | |
| Kyle Casey | November 2 | Bakersfield Jam | D-League | Phoenix Suns | Unrestricted free agent | |
| Earl Clark | November 2 | Bakersfield Jam | D-League | Brooklyn Nets | Unrestricted free agent | |
| Will Cummings | November 2 | Rio Grande Valley Vipers | D-League | Houston Rockets | Unrestricted free agent | |
| Corey Hawkins | November 2 | Sioux Falls Skyforce | D-League | Miami Heat | Unrestricted free agent | |
| Marshall Henderson | November 2 | Reno Bighorns | D-League | Sacramento Kings | Unrestricted free agent | |
| Xavier Henry | November 2 | Santa Cruz Warriors | D-League | Golden State Warriors | Unrestricted free agent | |
| Vince Hunter | November 2 | Reno Bighorns | D-League | Sacramento Kings | Unrestricted free agent | |
| Jaron Johnson* | November 2 | Rio Grande Valley Vipers | D-League | Washington Wizards | Unrestricted free agent | |
| Tre Kelley* | November 2 | Sioux Falls Skyforce | D-League | Miami Heat | Unrestricted free agent | |
| Ricky Ledo | November 2 | Reno Bighorns | D-League | New York Knicks | Unrestricted free agent | |
| Denzel Livingston | November 2 | Rio Grande Valley Vipers | D-League | Houston Rockets | Unrestricted free agent | |
| Jordan McRae* | November 2 | Delaware 87ers | D-League | Philadelphia 76ers | Unrestricted free agent | |
| Dan Nwaelele* | November 2 | Santa Cruz Warriors | D-League | Memphis Grizzlies | Unrestricted free agent | |
| Jordan Railey | November 2 | Delaware 87ers | D-League | Philadelphia 76ers | Unrestricted free agent | |
| Wesley Saunders | November 2 | Westchester Knicks | D-League | New York Knicks | Unrestricted free agent | |
| Joshua Smith | November 2 | Rio Grande Valley Vipers | D-League | Houston Rockets | Unrestricted free agent | |
| Juwan Staten | November 2 | Santa Cruz Warriors | D-League | Golden State Warriors | Unrestricted free agent | |
| DaJuan Summers | November 2 | Westchester Knicks | D-League | New York Knicks | Unrestricted free agent | |
| Travis Trice | November 2 | Westchester Knicks | D-League | New York Knicks | Unrestricted free agent | |
| Chris Udofia | November 2 | Santa Cruz Warriors | D-League | Golden State Warriors | Unrestricted free agent | |
| Chris Walker | November 2 | Rio Grande Valley Vipers | D-League | Houston Rockets | Unrestricted free agent | |
| Brianté Weber | November 2 | Sioux Falls Skyforce | D-League | Miami Heat | Unrestricted free agent | |
| Terrico White | November 2 | Bakersfield Jam | D-League | Phoenix Suns | Unrestricted free agent | |
| Greg Whittington | November 2 | Sioux Falls Skyforce | D-League | Miami Heat | Unrestricted free agent | |
| Michael Cobbins | November 3 | Oklahoma City Blue | D-League | Oklahoma City Thunder | Unrestricted free agent | |
| Mustapha Farrakhan Jr. | November 3 | Oklahoma City Blue | D-League | Oklahoma City Thunder | Unrestricted free agent | |
| Dakari Johnson | November 3 | Oklahoma City Blue | D-League | Oklahoma City Thunder | Unsigned draft pick | |
| Michael Qualls | November 3 | Oklahoma City Blue | D-League | Oklahoma City Thunder | Unrestricted free agent | |
| Dez Wells | November 3 | Oklahoma City Blue | D-League | Oklahoma City Thunder | Unrestricted free agent | |
| Talib Zanna* | November 3 | Oklahoma City Blue | D-League | Oklahoma City Thunder | Unrestricted free agent | |
| Lorenzo Brown* | November 12 | Grand Rapids Drive | D-League | Minnesota Timberwolves | Unrestricted free agent | |
| Henry Sims | November 12 | Grand Rapids Drive | D-League | Phoenix Suns | Unrestricted free agent | |
| Elliot Williams* | November 12 | Santa Cruz Warriors | D-League | Charlotte Hornets | Unrestricted free agent | |
| Jamil Wilson | November 12 | Texas Legends | D-League | Dallas Mavericks | Unrestricted free agent | |
| Ronald Roberts | November 13 | Raptors 905 | D-League | Toronto Raptors | Unrestricted free agent | |
| Jack Cooley* | November 16 | Idaho Stampede | D-League | Cleveland Cavaliers | Unrestricted free agent | |
| Justin Harper | November 16 | Los Angeles D-Fenders | D-League | Brooklyn Nets | Unrestricted free agent | |
| Sean Kilpatrick* | November 17 | Delaware 87ers | D-League | New Orleans Pelicans | Unrestricted free agent | |
| Erick Green | November 21 | Reno Bighorns | D-League | Denver Nuggets | Unrestricted free agent | |
| David Stockton* | November 27 | Reno Bighorns | D-League | Sacramento Kings | Unrestricted free agent | |
| Jimmer Fredette* | November 28 | Westchester Knicks | D-League | New Orleans Pelicans | Unrestricted free agent | |
| Jamaal Franklin* | December 4 | Los Angeles D-Fenders | D-League | Denver Nuggets | Unrestricted free agent | |
| Dahntay Jones | December 4 | Grand Rapids Drive | D-League | Brooklyn Nets | Unrestricted free agent | |
| Phil Pressey* | December 7 | Idaho Stampede | D-League | Philadelphia 76ers | Unrestricted free agent | |
| Jorge Gutiérrez* | December 10 | Canton Charge | D-League | Milwaukee Bucks | Unrestricted free agent | |
| Bryce Dejean-Jones | December 13 | Idaho Stampede | D-League | New Orleans Pelicans | Unrestricted free agent | |
| Jake Anderson | December 15 | Pontiac 66ers | MPBA | Chicago Bulls | Unrestricted free agent | |
| Jon Horford | December 23 | Canton Charge | D-League | Milwaukee Bucks | Unrestricted free agent | |
| Nick Johnson | December 28 | Austin Spurs | D-League | Denver Nuggets | Unrestricted free agent | |
| Greg Smith | January 5 | Raptors 905 | D-League | Dallas Mavericks | Unrestricted free agent | |
| Pierre Jackson* | January 6 | Idaho Stampede | D-League | Philadelphia 76ers | Unrestricted free agent | |
| Christian Wood* | January 6 | Delaware 87ers | D-League | Philadelphia 76ers | Unrestricted free agent | |
| Bryce Cotton* | January 12 | Austin Spurs | D-League | Phoenix Suns | Unrestricted free agent | |
| Russ Smith | January 13 | Delaware 87ers | D-League | Memphis Grizzlies | Unrestricted free agent | |
| John Lucas III | January 14 | Fort Wayne Mad Ants | D-League | Miami Heat | Unrestricted free agent | |
| Cory Jefferson | January 20 | Bakersfield Jam | D-League | Phoenix Suns | Unrestricted free agent | |
| Elliot Williams* | January 22 | Santa Cruz Warriors | D-League | Memphis Grizzlies | Unrestricted free agent | |
| J. J. O'Brien* | January 26 | Idaho Stampede | D-League | Utah Jazz | Unrestricted free agent | |
| Cory Jefferson* | February 1 | Bakersfield Jam | D-League | Phoenix Suns | Unrestricted free agent | |
| Lorenzo Brown* | February 2 | Grand Rapids Drive | D-League | Phoenix Suns | Unrestricted free agent | |
| Sean Kilpatrick* | February 2 | Delaware 87ers | D-League | Denver Nuggets | Unrestricted free agent | |
| Keith Appling* | February 8 | Erie BayHawks | D-League | Orlando Magic | Unrestricted free agent | |
| Thanasis Antetokounmpo* | February 9 | Westchester Knicks | D-League | New York Knicks | Unrestricted free agent | |
| Erick Green* | February 19 | Reno Bighorns | D-League | Utah Jazz | Unrestricted free agent | |
| Jeff Ayres* | February 20 | Idaho Stampede | D-League | Los Angeles Clippers | Unrestricted free agent | |
| Orlando Johnson* | February 20 | Austin Spurs | D-League | Phoenix Suns | Unrestricted free agent | |
| Jordan McRae* | February 23 | Delaware 87ers | D-League | Phoenix Suns | Unrestricted free agent | |
| Tim Frazier* | February 27 | Maine Red Claws | D-League | Portland Trail Blazers | Unrestricted free agent | |
| Jarnell Stokes* | February 27 | Sioux Falls Skyforce | D-League | New Orleans Pelicans | Unrestricted free agent | |
| Chris Douglas-Roberts* | February 29 | Texas Legends | D-League | New Orleans Pelicans | Unrestricted free agent | |
| James Ennis* | March 6 | Iowa Energy | D-League | Memphis Grizzlies | Unrestricted free agent | |
| Jimmer Fredette* | March 6 | Westchester Knicks | D-League | New York Knicks | Unrestricted free agent | |
| Jared Cunningham* | March 8 | Idaho Stampede | D-League | Orlando Magic | Unrestricted free agent | |
| Christian Wood* | March 9 | Delaware 87ers | D-League | Philadelphia 76ers | Unrestricted free agent | |
| Phil Pressey* | March 12 | Idaho Stampede | D-League | Phoenix Suns | Unrestricted free agent | |
| Justin Harper* | March 15 | Los Angeles D-Fenders | D-League | Detroit Pistons | Unrestricted free agent | |
| Orlando Johnson* | March 21 | Austin Spurs | D-League | New Orleans Pelicans | Unrestricted free agent | |
| Brianté Weber* | March 21 | Sioux Falls Skyforce | D-League | Memphis Grizzlies | Unrestricted free agent | |
| Alex Stepheson* | March 23 | Iowa Energy | D-League | Memphis Grizzlies | Unrestricted free agent | |
| Jared Cunningham* | March 28 | Idaho Stampede | D-League | Milwaukee Bucks | Unrestricted free agent | |
| Coty Clarke* | March 29 | Maine Red Claws | D-League | Boston Celtics | Unrestricted free agent | |
| Darius Morris* | March 29 | Rio Grande Valley Vipers | D-League | Brooklyn Nets | Unrestricted free agent | |

=== Going overseas ===
| * | Denotes international players who returned to their home country |

| Player | Date signed | New team | New country | NBA team | NBA contract status | Ref |
|---|---|---|---|---|---|---|
| Pero Antić | June 30 | Fenerbahçe | Turkey | Atlanta Hawks | Unrestricted free agent | |
| Artūras Gudaitis | July 2 | Lietuvos Rytas | Lithuania | Philadelphia 76ers | Unsigned draft pick | |
| Dani Díez | July 8 | Unicaja Málaga | Spain | Portland Trail Blazers | Unsigned draft pick | |
| Vítor Faverani | July 10 | Maccabi FOX Tel Aviv | Israel | Boston Celtics | Unrestricted free agent | |
| Joel Freeland | July 13 | CSKA Moscow | Russia | Portland Trail Blazers | Unrestricted free agent | |
| Luigi Datome | July 14 | Fenerbahçe | Turkey | Boston Celtics | Unrestricted free agent | |
| Nick Calathes* | July 15 | Panathinaikos | Greece | Memphis Grizzlies | Restricted free agent | |
| Alexey Shved* | July 16 | Khimki | Russia | New York Knicks | Unrestricted free agent | |
| Miroslav Raduljica | July 18 | Panathinaikos | Greece | Minnesota Timberwolves | Unrestricted free agent | |
| Marcus Thornton | July 22 | Sydney Kings | Australia | Boston Celtics | Unsigned draft pick | |
| Nate Wolters | July 24 | Beşiktaş Sompo Japan | Turkey | New Orleans Pelicans | Unrestricted free agent | |
| Nikola Milutinov | July 25 | Olympiacos | Greece | San Antonio Spurs | Unsigned draft pick | |
| Aaron White | July 26 | Telekom Baskets Bonn | Germany | Washington Wizards | Unsigned draft pick | |
| Justin Hamilton | July 27 | Valencia | Spain | Minnesota Timberwolves | Unrestricted free agent | |
| Ognjen Kuzmić | July 27 | Panathinaikos | Greece | Golden State Warriors | Unrestricted free agent | |
| Ekpe Udoh | July 28 | Fenerbahçe | Turkey | Los Angeles Clippers | Unrestricted free agent | |
| Robbie Hummel | July 31 | EA7 Emporio Armani Milano | Italy | Minnesota Timberwolves | Unrestricted free agent | |
| Bernard James | July 31 | Shanghai Sharks | China | Dallas Mavericks | Unrestricted free agent | |
| Jerel McNeal | July 31 | Aris Thessaloniki | Greece | Phoenix Suns | Unrestricted free agent | |
| Shavlik Randolph | July 31 | Liaoning Flying Leopards | China | Denver Nuggets | Unrestricted free agent | |
| Olivier Hanlan | August 8 | Žalgiris Kaunas | Lithuania | Utah Jazz | Unsigned draft pick | |
| Jason Maxiell | August 10 | Tianjin Ronggang | China | Charlotte Hornets | Unrestricted free agent | |
| David Wear | August 10 | Montakit Fuenlabrada | Spain | Sacramento Kings | Unrestricted free agent | |
| Andre Dawkins | August 13 | Manital Torino | Italy | Boston Celtics | Unrestricted free agent | |
| Zoran Dragić | August 13 | Khimki | Russia | Boston Celtics | Unrestricted free agent | |
| Dorell Wright | August 17 | Beikong Fly Dragons | China | Portland Trail Blazers | Unrestricted free agent | |
| Will Bynum | August 21 | Guangdong Southern Tigers | China | Washington Wizards | Unrestricted free agent | |
| Jordan Hamilton | August 22 | Krasny Oktyabr | Russia | Los Angeles Clippers | Unrestricted free agent | |
| Jeffery Taylor | August 27 | Real Madrid | Spain | Charlotte Hornets | Unrestricted free agent | |
| Joey Dorsey | August 29 | Galatasaray Liv Hospital | Turkey | Denver Nuggets | Unrestricted free agent | |
| A. J. Price | September 11 | Shanghai Sharks | China | Phoenix Suns | Unrestricted free agent | |
| Lester Hudson | September 13 | Liaoning Flying Leopards | China | Los Angeles Clippers | Unrestricted free agent | |
| Dwight Buycks | September 24 | Fujian Sturgeons | China | Los Angeles Lakers | Unrestricted free agent | |
| Michael Beasley | September 30 | Shandong Golden Stars | China | Miami Heat | Unrestricted free agent | |
| Arinze Onuaku | October 6 | Maccabi FOX Tel Aviv | Israel | Minnesota Timberwolves | Unrestricted free agent | |
| Travis Wear | October 7 | RETAbet.es GBC | Spain | New York Knicks | Unrestricted free agent | |
| Matt Janning | October 15 | Hapoel Jerusalem | Israel | Denver Nuggets | Unrestricted free agent | |
| Corey Webster* | October 15 | New Zealand Breakers | New Zealand (Note: The New Zealand Breakers are a NZ team playing in the Australian league.) | New Orleans Pelicans | Unrestricted free agent | |
| Édgar Sosa | October 19 | Petrochimi Bandar Imam | Iran | Atlanta Hawks | Unrestricted free agent | |
| Quincy Miller | October 20 | Crvena Zvezda Telekom | Serbia | Brooklyn Nets | Unrestricted free agent | |
| Damien Wilkins | October 25 | Guaros de Lara | Venezuela | Charlotte Hornets | Unrestricted free agent | |
| Jarrid Famous | October 27 | Fujian Sturgeons | China | Dallas Mavericks | Unrestricted free agent | |
| Julyan Stone | October 27 | Royal Halı Gaziantep | Turkey | Oklahoma City Thunder | Unrestricted free agent | |
| Scottie Wilbekin | October 31 | Darüşşafaka & Doğuş | Turkey | Philadelphia 76ers | Unrestricted free agent | |
| Yakhouba Diawara* | November 2 | Limoges CSP | France | Memphis Grizzlies | Unrestricted free agent | |
| Nikoloz Tskitishvili | November 2 | Link Tochigi Brex | Japan | Los Angeles Clippers | Unrestricted free agent | |
| Jason Washburn | November 3 | Sigal Prishtina | Kosovo | Charlotte Hornets | Unrestricted free agent | |
| Furkan Aldemir* | November 7 | Darüşşafaka & Doğuş | Turkey | Philadelphia 76ers | Unrestricted free agent | |
| Henry Walker | November 7 | Cedevita Zagreb | Croatia | Miami Heat | Unrestricted free agent | |
| Eric Griffin | November 10 | Al-Nasr Dubai | United Arab Emirates | Detroit Pistons | Unrestricted free agent | |
| Earl Barron | November 17 | Fubon Braves | Taiwan | Atlanta Hawks | Unrestricted free agent | |
| Chris Babb | November 19 | ratiopharm Ulm | Germany | Golden State Warriors | Unrestricted free agent | |
| Jordan Crawford | November 19 | Tianjin Ronggang | China | Chicago Bulls | Unrestricted free agent | |
| Jabari Brown | November 23 | Foshan Dralions | China | Los Angeles Lakers | Unrestricted free agent | |
| Jeremy Tyler | November 25 | Fujian Sturgeons | China | Houston Rockets | Unrestricted free agent | |
| Austin Daye | November 27 | Consultinvest Pesaro | Italy | Cleveland Cavaliers | Unrestricted free agent | |
| DeQuan Jones | November 29 | Chiba Jets | Japan | Atlanta Hawks | Unrestricted free agent | |
| Devin Sweetney | November 29 | Halcones Rojos Veracruz | Mexico | Denver Nuggets | Unrestricted free agent | |
| Dionte Christmas | December 1 | Hapoel Holon | Israel | Cleveland Cavaliers | Unrestricted free agent | |
| Josh Powell | December 3 | San Lorenzo de Almagro | Argentina | Milwaukee Bucks | Unrestricted free agent | |
| Maurice Ndour | December 5 | Real Madrid | Spain | Dallas Mavericks | Unrestricted free agent | |
| Mirza Begić | December 7 | Dominion Bilbao Basket | Spain | New Orleans Pelicans | Unrestricted free agent | |
| Tony Mitchell | December 11 | Cocodrilos de Caracas | Venezuela | Golden State Warriors | Unrestricted free agent | |
| Jerome Jordan | December 15 | Jiangsu Monkey King | China | New Orleans Pelicans | Unrestricted free agent | |
| Samuel Dalembert | December 17 | Shanxi Zhongyu | China | Dallas Mavericks | Unrestricted free agent | |
| Josh Harrellson | December 18 | VEF Rīga | Latvia | Washington Wizards | Unrestricted free agent | |
| Marcus Landry | December 20 | RETAbet.es GBC | Spain | Milwaukee Bucks | Unrestricted free agent | |
| Chris Daniels | December 25 | Al-Riyadi Beirut | Lebanon | Brooklyn Nets | Unrestricted free agent | |
| Kleon Penn | December 26 | Trotamundos de Carabobo | Venezuela | Minnesota Timberwolves | Unrestricted free agent | |
| Arsalan Kazemi* | December 29 | Samen Mash'had | Iran | Houston Rockets | Unrestricted free agent | |
| Charlie Westbrook | December 29 | Juventud Sionista | Argentina | Milwaukee Bucks | Unrestricted free agent | |
| Bo McCalebb | January 3 | Limoges CSP | France | New Orleans Pelicans | Unrestricted free agent | |
| Reggie Williams | January 9 | Avtodor Saratov | Russia | San Antonio Spurs | Unrestricted free agent | |
| Kostas Papanikolaou* | January 20 | Olympiacos | Greece | Denver Nuggets | Unrestricted free agent | |
| Elijah Millsap | January 23 | Maccabi FOX Tel Aviv | Israel | Utah Jazz | Unrestricted free agent | |
| Oleksiy Pecherov | February 3 | Club Sagesse | Lebanon | Denver Nuggets | Unrestricted free agent | |
| Chris Johnson | February 15 | Capitanes de Arecibo | Puerto Rico | Cleveland Cavaliers | Unrestricted free agent | |
| Jaleel Roberts | March 7 | Brisbane Spartans | Australia | Washington Wizards | Unrestricted free agent | |
| Nate Robinson | March 17 | Hapoel Tel Aviv | Israel | New Orleans Pelicans | Unrestricted free agent | |
| Jordan Hamilton | April 27 | Bucaneros de La Guaira | Venezuela | New Orleans Pelicans | Unrestricted free agent | |

=== Released ===
==== Waived ====
| Player | Date waived | Former team | Ref |
|---|---|---|---|
| Ben Gordon | June 29 | Orlando Magic | |
| Darius Morris | June 29 | Brooklyn Nets | |
| Caron Butler | June 30 | Milwaukee Bucks | |
| Shawne Williams | June 30 | Milwaukee Bucks | |
| Austin Daye | July 9 | Atlanta Hawks | |
| Luke Ridnour | July 9 | Toronto Raptors | |
| Deron Williams | July 11 | Brooklyn Nets | |
| Jamaal Franklin | July 13 | Denver Nuggets | |
| Cory Jefferson | July 13 | Brooklyn Nets | |
| Lester Hudson | July 15 | Los Angeles Clippers | |
| Phil Pressey | July 15 | Boston Celtics | |
| Jerel McNeal | July 17 | Phoenix Suns | |
| Pablo Prigioni | July 20 | Denver Nuggets | |
| Henry Walker | July 27 | Miami Heat | |
| Eric Moreland | July 29 | Sacramento Kings | |
| Brendan Haywood | July 30 | Portland Trail Blazers | |
| Ricky Ledo | July 30 | New York Knicks | |
| Toney Douglas | July 31 | New Orleans Pelicans | |
| Jordan Hamilton | August 1 | Los Angeles Clippers | |
| Earl Clark | August 10 | Brooklyn Nets | |
| Zoran Dragić | August 10 | Boston Celtics | |
| Joey Dorsey | August 18 | Denver Nuggets | |
| Remi Yusuf | September 18 | Houston Rockets | |
| Anthony Bennett | September 23 | Minnesota Timberwolves | |
| Patrick Christopher | September 23 | Memphis Grizzlies | |
| Kostas Papanikolaou | September 25 | Denver Nuggets | |
| Gerald Wallace | September 27 | Philadelphia 76ers | |
| Mike Miller | September 28 | Portland Trail Blazers | |
| Nate Robinson | October 29 | New Orleans Pelicans | |
| Erick Green | November 5 | Denver Nuggets | |
| Chuck Hayes | November 8 | Houston Rockets | |
| Jimmer Fredette | November 19 | New Orleans Pelicans | |
| Martell Webster | November 30 | Washington Wizards | |
| Phil Pressey | December 4 | Philadelphia 76ers | |
| Ryan Hollins | December 23 | Washington Wizards | |
| Tony Wroten | December 24 | Philadelphia 76ers | |
| Russ Smith | December 29 | Memphis Grizzlies | |
| Christian Wood | January 4 | Philadelphia 76ers | |
| Elijah Millsap | January 5 | Utah Jazz | |
| Bryce Cotton | January 7 | Phoenix Suns | |
| Ryan Hollins | January 7 | Memphis Grizzlies | |
| Cory Jefferson | January 7 | Phoenix Suns | |
| Kostas Papanikolaou | January 7 | Denver Nuggets | |
| Joe Harris | January 12 | Orlando Magic | |
| Tim Frazier | February 18 | Portland Trail Blazers | |
| JaKarr Sampson | February 18 | Philadelphia 76ers | |
| Anderson Varejão | February 18 | Portland Trail Blazers | |
| JJ Hickson | February 19 | Denver Nuggets | |
| David Lee | February 19 | Boston Celtics | |
| Steve Novak | February 19 | Denver Nuggets | |
| Jarnell Stokes | February 19 | New Orleans Pelicans | |
| Andrea Bargnani | February 20 | Brooklyn Nets | |
| DeJuan Blair | February 22 | Phoenix Suns | |
| Chris Copeland | February 22 | Milwaukee Bucks | |
| Jared Cunningham | February 22 | Orlando Magic | |
| John Jenkins | February 22 | Dallas Mavericks | |
| Jason Thompson | February 22 | Golden State Warriors | |
| Chris Copeland | February 24 | Orlando Magic | |
| Joe Johnson | February 25 | Brooklyn Nets | |
| Andre Miller | February 25 | Minnesota Timberwolves | |
| Marcus Thornton | February 26 | Houston Rockets | |
| Kris Humphries | February 28 | Phoenix Suns | |
| Ray McCallum Jr. | February 29 | San Antonio Spurs | |
| Beno Udrih | February 29 | Miami Heat | |
| Anthony Bennett | March 1 | Toronto Raptors | |
| Ty Lawson | March 1 | Houston Rockets | |
| Kevin Martin | March 1 | Minnesota Timberwolves | |
| James Ennis | March 2 | Memphis Grizzlies | |
| Chase Budinger | March 5 | Indiana Pacers | |
| Sonny Weems | March 5 | Phoenix Suns | |
| Christian Wood | March 7 | Philadelphia 76ers | |
| Rasual Butler | March 9 | San Antonio Spurs | |
| Gary Neal | March 9 | Washington Wizards | |
| Mario Chalmers | March 10 | Memphis Grizzlies | |
| Sonny Weems | March 27 | Philadelphia 76ers | |
| Ryan Hollins | April 7 | Memphis Grizzlies | |

==== Training camp cuts ====
All players listed did not make the final roster.

| Atlanta Hawks | Boston Celtics | Brooklyn Nets | Charlotte Hornets | Chicago Bulls |
|---|---|---|---|---|
| Earl Barron; DeQuan Jones; Arsalan Kazemi; Terran Petteway; Édgar Sosa | Coty Clarke; Perry Jones; Malcolm Miller; Levi Randolph; Corey Walden | Ryan Boatright; Chris Daniels; Justin Harper; Dahntay Jones; Quincy Miller | Sam Thompson; Jason Washburn; Damien Wilkins; Elliot Williams | Jake Anderson; Jordan Crawford; Stefhon Hannah; Marcus Simmons |
| Cleveland Cavaliers | Dallas Mavericks | Denver Nuggets | Detroit Pistons | Golden State Warriors |
| Dionte Christmas; Quinn Cook; Jack Cooley; Austin Daye; Michael Dunigan; Chris Johnson; Nick Minnerath; D. J. Stephens | Brandon Ashley; Samuel Dalembert; Tu Holloway; Jarrid Famous; Jamil Wilson; Maurice Ndour | Matt Janning; Nick Johnson; Oleksiy Pecherov; Devin Sweetney | Jordan Bachynski; Ryan Boatright; Danny Granger; Eric Griffin; Cartier Martin; Adonis Thomas | Chris Babb; Jarell Eddie; Ben Gordon; Xavier Henry; Tony Mitchell; Juwan Staten; Chris Udofia |
| Houston Rockets | Indiana Pacers | Los Angeles Clippers | Los Angeles Lakers | Memphis Grizzlies |
| Will Cummings; Arsalan Kazemi; Denzel Livingston; Joshua Smith; Jeremy Tyler; Chris Walker | Toney Douglas; C. J. Fair; Kadeem Jack; Terran Petteway | Chuck Hayes; Nikoloz Tskitishvili | Jabari Brown; Michael Frazier II; Jonathan Holmes; Robert Upshaw | Sampson Carter; Yakhouba Diawara; Ryan Hollins; Michael Holyfield; Lazeric Jones; Dan Nwaelele; Alex Stepheson |
| Miami Heat | Milwaukee Bucks | Minnesota Timberwolves | New Orleans Pelicans | New York Knicks |
| Keith Benson; Corey Hawkins; Tre Kelley; John Lucas III; Brianté Weber; Greg Whittington | Jorge Gutiérrez; Jon Horford; Marcus Landry; Josh Powell; Charlie Westbrook | Lorenzo Brown; Kleon Penn; Nick Wiggins | Jeff Adrien; Mirza Begić; Bryce Dejean-Jones; Chris Douglas-Roberts; Jerome Jordan; Sean Kilpatrick; Bo McCalebb; Corey Webster | Thanasis Antetokounmpo; Darion Atkins; Wesley Saunders; DaJuan Summers; Travis Trice |
| Oklahoma City Thunder | Orlando Magic | Philadelphia 76ers | Phoenix Suns | Portland Trail Blazers |
| Michael Cobbins; Mustapha Farrakhan Jr.; Michael Qualls; Julyan Stone; Dez Wells; Talib Zanna | Keith Appling; Nnanna Egwu; Melvin Ejim; Jordan Sibert; Greg Stiemsma | Furkan Aldemir; Pierre Jackson; Jordan McRae; Jordan Railey; J. P. Tokoto; Scottie Wilbekin | Deonte Burton; Kyle Casey; Henry Sims; Terrico White | Omari Johnson; Phil Pressey |
| Sacramento Kings | San Antonio Spurs | Toronto Raptors | Utah Jazz | Washington Wizards |
| Marshall Henderson; Vince Hunter; David Stockton | Jimmer Fredette; Youssou Ndoye; Keifer Sykes; Deshaun Thomas; Julian Washburn; Reggie Williams | Michale Kyser; Ronald Roberts; Shannon Scott; Axel Toupane | Eric Atkins; Jack Cooley; Bryce Cotton; Treveon Graham; Grant Jerrett; J. J. O'Brien; Phil Pressey; E. J. Singler | Josh Harrellson; Jaron Johnson; Toure' Murry; Jaleel Roberts; Ish Smith |

== Draft ==
=== 2015 NBA draft ===
The 2015 NBA draft was held on June 25, 2015, at Barclays Center in Brooklyn, New York.

==== First round ====
| Pick | Player | Date signed | Team | School/club team | Ref |
|---|---|---|---|---|---|
| 1 | Karl-Anthony Towns | July 7 | Minnesota Timberwolves | Kentucky (Fr.) | |
| 2 | D'Angelo Russell | July 10 | Los Angeles Lakers | Ohio State (Fr.) | |
| 3 | Jahlil Okafor | July 7 | Philadelphia 76ers | Duke (Fr.) | |
| 4 | Kristaps Porziņģis | July 30 | New York Knicks | Sevilla (Spain) | |
| 5 | Mario Hezonja | July 10 | Orlando Magic | FC Barcelona Lassa (Spain) | |
| 6 | Willie Cauley-Stein | July 16 | Sacramento Kings | Kentucky (Jr.) | |
| 7 | Emmanuel Mudiay | July 31 | Denver Nuggets | Guangdong Southern Tigers (China) | |
| 8 | Stanley Johnson | July 22 | Detroit Pistons | Arizona (Fr.) | |
| 9 | Frank Kaminsky | July 2 | Charlotte Hornets | Wisconsin (Sr.) | |
| 10 | Justise Winslow | July 3 | Miami Heat | Duke (Fr.) | |
| 11 | Myles Turner | July 13 | Indiana Pacers | Texas (Fr.) | |
| 12 | Trey Lyles | July 7 | Utah Jazz | Kentucky (Fr.) | |
| 13 | Devin Booker | July 13 | Phoenix Suns | Kentucky (Fr.) | |
| 14 | Cameron Payne | July 10 | Oklahoma City Thunder | Murray State (So.) | |
| 15 | Kelly Oubre Jr. | July 9 | Washington Wizards (acquired from Atlanta) | Kansas (Fr.) | |
| 16 | Terry Rozier | July 27 | Boston Celtics | Louisville (So.) | |
| 17 | Rashad Vaughn | July 17 | Milwaukee Bucks | UNLV (Fr.) | |
| 18 | Sam Dekker | July 22 (Note: There is a discrepancy over Sam Dekker's contract signing date as the Sheboygan Press reports July 7, RealGM reports July 20, and Eric Pincus of BasketballInsiders.com reports July 22.) | Houston Rockets | Wisconsin (Jr.) | |
| 19 | Jerian Grant | July 30 | New York Knicks (acquired from Washington via Atlanta) | Notre Dame (Sr.) | |
| 20 | Delon Wright | July 3 | Toronto Raptors | Utah (Sr.) | |
| 21 | Justin Anderson | August 1 | Dallas Mavericks | Virginia (Jr.) | |
| 22 | Bobby Portis | July 7 | Chicago Bulls | Arkansas (So.) | |
| 23 | Rondae Hollis-Jefferson | July 6 | Brooklyn Nets (acquired from Portland) | Arizona (So.) | |
| 24 | Tyus Jones | July 7 | Minnesota Timberwolves (acquired from Cleveland) | Duke (Fr.) | |
| 25 | Jarell Martin | July 10 | Memphis Grizzlies | LSU (So.) | |
| 26 | Nikola Milutinov | — | San Antonio Spurs | Partizan Belgrade (Serbia) | |
| 27 | Larry Nance Jr. | July 10 | Los Angeles Lakers | Wyoming (Sr.) | |
| 28 | R. J. Hunter | July 27 | Boston Celtics | Georgia State (Jr.) | |
| 29 | Chris McCullough | July 1 | Brooklyn Nets | Syracuse (Fr.) | |
| 30 | Kevon Looney | July 8 | Golden State Warriors | UCLA (Fr.) | |

==== Second round ====
| Pick | Player | Date signed | Team | School/club team | Ref |
|---|---|---|---|---|---|
| 31 | Cedi Osman | — | Cleveland Cavaliers (acquired from Minnesota) | Anadolu Efes (Turkey) | |
| 32 | Montrezl Harrell | September 19 | Houston Rockets | Louisville (Jr.) | |
| 33 | Jordan Mickey | July 20 | Boston Celtics | LSU (So.) | |
| 34 | Anthony Brown | July 9 | Los Angeles Lakers | Stanford (Sr.) | |
| 35 | Willy Hernangómez | — | New York Knicks (acquired from Philadelphia) | Baloncesto Sevilla (Spain) | |
| 36 | Rakeem Christmas | July 27 | Indiana Pacers (acquired from Minnesota via Cleveland) | Syracuse (Sr.) | |
| 37 | Richaun Holmes | July 31 | Philadelphia 76ers | Bowling Green (Sr.) | |
| 38 | Darrun Hilliard | July 20 | Detroit Pistons | Villanova (Sr.) | |
| 39 | Juan Pablo Vaulet | — | Brooklyn Nets (acquired from Charlotte) | Estudiantes Bahía Blanca (Argentina) | |
| 40 | Josh Richardson | August 3 | Miami Heat | Tennessee (Sr.) | |
| 41 | Pat Connaughton | July 9 | Portland Trail Blazers (acquired from Brooklyn) | Notre Dame (Sr.) | |
| 42 | Olivier Hanlan | — | Utah Jazz | Boston College (Jr.) | |
| 43 | Joe Young | July 14 | Indiana Pacers | Oregon (Sr.) | |
| 44 | Andrew Harrison | — | Memphis Grizzlies (acquired from Phoenix) | Kentucky (So.) | |
| 45 | Marcus Thornton | — | Boston Celtics | William & Mary (Sr.) | |
| 46 | Norman Powell | July 15 | Toronto Raptors (acquired from Milwaukee) | UCLA (Sr.) | |
| 47 | Artūras Gudaitis | — | Philadelphia 76ers | Žalgiris Kaunas (Lithuania) | |
| 48 | Dakari Johnson | — | Oklahoma City Thunder | Kentucky (So.) | |
| 49 | Aaron White | — | Washington Wizards | Iowa (Sr.) | |
| 50 | Marcus Eriksson | — | Atlanta Hawks | FC Barcelona Lassa (Spain) | |
| 51 | Tyler Harvey | — | Orlando Magic | Eastern Washington (Jr.) | |
| 52 | Satnam Singh Bhamara | — | Dallas Mavericks | IMG Academy ((Bradenton, Florida) HSPg.) | |
| 53 | Sir'Dominic Pointer | — | Cleveland Cavaliers | St. John's (Sr.) | |
| 54 | Dani Díez | — | Portland Trail Blazers (acquired from Utah) | Gipuzkoa Basket (Spain) | |
| 55 | Cady Lalanne | — | San Antonio Spurs | Massachusetts (Sr.) | |
| 56 | Branden Dawson | July 15 | Los Angeles Clippers (acquired from New Orleans) | Michigan State (Sr.) | |
| 57 | Nikola Radičević | — | Denver Nuggets | Baloncesto Sevilla (Spain) | |
| 58 | J. P. Tokoto | September 27 | Philadelphia 76ers | North Carolina (Jr.) | |
| 59 | Dimitrios Agravanis | — | Atlanta Hawks | Olympiacos Piraeus (Greece) | |
| 60 | Luka Mitrović | — | Philadelphia 76ers | Red Star Belgrade (Serbia) | |

=== Previous years' draftees ===
| Draft | Pick | Player | Date signed | Team | Previous team | Ref |
|---|---|---|---|---|---|---|
| 2013 | 47 | Raul Neto | July 9 | Utah Jazz | UCAM Murcia (Spain) | |
| 2014 | 43 | Walter Tavares | July 9 | Atlanta Hawks | Herbalife Gran Canaria (Spain) | |
| 2010 | 35 | Nemanja Bjelica | July 14 | Minnesota Timberwolves | Fenerbahçe (Turkey) | |
| 2010 | 31 | Tibor Pleiß | July 14 | Utah Jazz | FC Barcelona Lassa (Spain) | |
| 2014 | 48 | Lamar Patterson | July 24 | Atlanta Hawks | Tofaş (Turkey) | |
| 2014 | 41 | Nikola Jokić | July 28 | Denver Nuggets | Mega Leks (Serbia) | |
| 2014 | 29 | Josh Huestis | July 30 | Oklahoma City Thunder | Oklahoma City Blue (D-League) | |
| 2014 | 51 | Thanasis Antetokounmpo | August 7 | New York Knicks | Westchester Knicks (D-League) | |
| 2008 | 56 | Sasha Kaun | September 9 | Cleveland Cavaliers | CSKA Moscow (Russia) | |
| 2014 | 58 | Jordan McRae | September 27 | Philadelphia 76ers | Delaware 87ers (D-League) | |
| 2013 | 58 | Deshaun Thomas | September 28 | San Antonio Spurs | FC Barcelona Lassa (Spain) | |
| 2013 | 54 | Arsalan Kazemi | September 29 | Atlanta Hawks | Chongqing Soaring Dragons (China) | |
