= Marcus Simmons (basketball) =

American basketball player (born 1988)

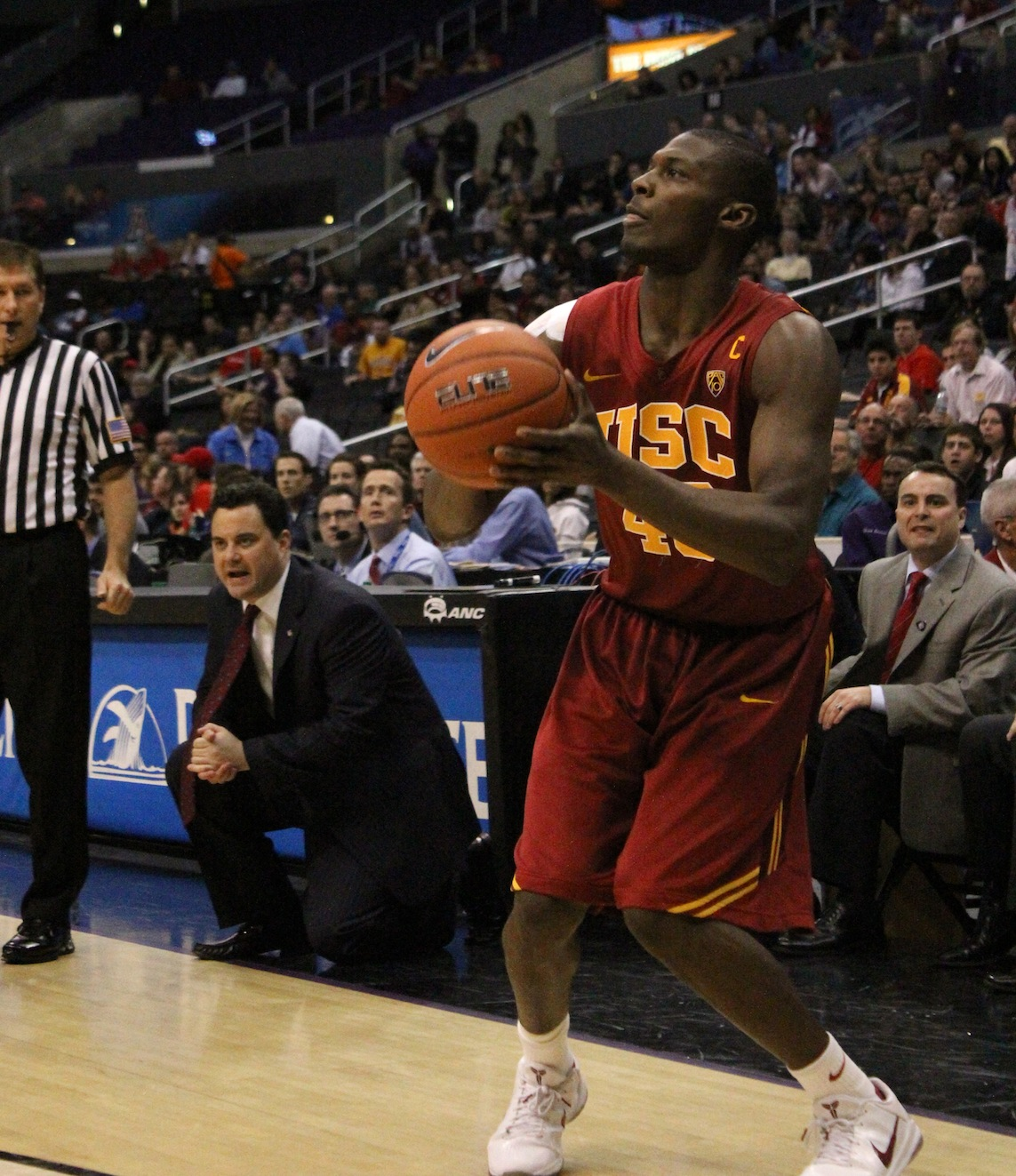

Personal information
- Born: January 28, 1988 (age 38) Alexandria, Louisiana, U.S.
- Listed height: 6 ft 6 in (1.98 m)
- Listed weight: 220 lb (100 kg)

Career information
- High school: Holy Savior Menard Central High School Peabody Magnet (Alexandria, Louisiana)
- College: USC (2007–2011)
- NBA draft: 2011: undrafted
- Playing career: 2011–2018
- Position: Shooting guard

Career history
- 2011–2012, 2013–2014: Yokohama B-Corsairs
- 2014–2016: Fort Wayne Mad Ants
- 2016: Phoenix Fuel Masters
- 2017–2018: Grand Rapids Drive

Career highlights
- Pac-10 Defensive Player of the Year (2011); Pac-10 All-Defensive team (2011)
- Stats at Basketball Reference

Marcus Jermaine Simmons (born January 28, 1988) is an American former professional basketball player. He played college basketball for the USC Trojans.

== High school career ==
Born in Alexandria, Louisiana, Simmons attended local Holy Savior Menard Central High School before transferring to Peabody Magnet High School where he averaged 18 points, 7 rebounds and 6 assists per game as a junior, leading Peabody to a 34–5 record and a No. 2 ranking in the state of Louisiana.

As a senior, he averaged 18.0 points, 8.0 rebounds, 5.0 assists and 3.0 steals per game, leading Peabody to a 37–4 record and the 2006-07 4-A Louisiana state championship while winning their last 17. He was selected to the All-District 4-A team and earned All-State honors and was ranked as the No. 47 small forward in the 2007 recruiting class by Rivals.com.

== College career ==
After graduating high school, Simmons attended USC. During 4 years with the Trojans, he played on 105 games, starting 46, with averages 3.1 points, 2 rebounds, 0.9 assists and 0.5 steals, playing mostly as a defensive specialist being named during his senior season, the Pac-10 Defensive Player of the Year and made the All-Defensive team.

== Professional career ==
After going undrafted in the 2011 NBA draft, Simmons signed with Yokohama B-Corsairs of the Japanese bj league on September 27, 2011.

After a year in Japan, Simmons was selected on the sixth round of the 2012 NBA Development League Draft by the Texas Legends on November 2, 2012, and three days later, was traded to the Canton Charge. He was later waived by the Charge November 15 prior to the start of the regular season.

On December 16, 2013, after a year off, Simmons re-signed with the B-Corsairs where he averaged 12.0 points, 5.0 rebounds, 1.1 assists and 1.2 steals in 34 games during the 2013–14 season.

On November 1, 2014, Simmons returned to the D-League, this time via the Fort Wayne Mad Ants' training camp, making it to the opening night roster on November 14. In 47 games for Fort Wayne in 2014–15, he averaged 4.1 points and 2.7 rebounds per game.

On September 28, 2015, Simmons signed with the Chicago Bulls However, he was later waived by the Bulls on October 22 after appearing in two preseason games. A week later, he was reacquired by the Fort Wayne Mad Ants.

On June 26, 2016, Simmons was signed by Phoenix Fuel Masters of the Philippine Basketball Association as the team's import for the 2016 PBA Governors' Cup. On October 31, he was reacquired by Fort Wayne, but was waived on November 10. On January 16, 2017, Simmons was acquired by the Grand Rapids Drive of the NBA Development League.
