= Charlie Westbrook =

American basketball player (born 1989)

Personal information
- Born: August 21, 1989 (age 37) Milwaukee, Wisconsin, U.S.
- Listed height: 6 ft 4 in (1.93 m)
- Listed weight: 196 lb (89 kg)

Career information
- High school: Riverside University HS (Milwaukee, Wisconsin)
- College: Iowa Western CC (2008–2010); South Dakota (2010–2012)
- NBA draft: 2012: undrafted
- Playing career: 2012–2016, 2018–2020
- Position: Shooting guard

Career history
- 2012–2013: Tezenis Verona
- 2013–2014: Sioux Falls Skyforce
- 2014: Austin Toros
- 2014: Springfield Armor
- 2014–2015: Hyères-Toulon
- 2015–2016: Juventud Sionista
- 2018–2019: Krosno
- 2019–2020: Umeå BSKT
- 2022: Sioux Falls Skyforce

Career highlights
- Second-team All-Summit League (2012); First-team All-GWC (2011); GWC All-Newcomers Team (2011)
- Stats at Basketball Reference

Charlie Westbrook (born August 21, 1989) is an American former professional basketball player. He played college basketball for Iowa Western Community College and the University of South Dakota.

== College career ==
Westbrook attended the University of South Dakota after transferring from Iowa Western Community College starting 58 games for the Coyotes in his two-year career. He became the 23rd player under Coyote head coach Dave Boots, and 42nd in school history, to reach the 1,000-point mark as he ended his career with 1,009 points. He is the first two-year, junior college player under Boots to score 1,000 points.

== Professional career ==
After going undrafted in the 2012 NBA draft, Westbrook joined the Orlando Magic for the 2012 NBA Summer League. In August 2012, he signed with Tezenis Verona of the Italian Legadue Basket for the 2012–13 season.

On September 30, 2013, Westbrook signed with the Miami Heat. However, he was later waived by the Heat on October 21, 2013.

On December 7, 2013, he was acquired by the Sioux Falls Skyforce of the NBA Development League. On January 4, 2014, he was traded to the Austin Toros. On March 15, 2014, he was waived by the Toros. On April 4, 2014, he was acquired by the Springfield Armor.

On September 29, 2014, he signed with Hyères-Toulon of France.

On September 18, 2015, Westbrook signed with the Milwaukee Bucks, however, he was waived on October 7. On December 29, he was acquired by Juventud Sionista of the Argentinian League.

On October 13, 2016, Westbrook signed with Polish club MKS Dąbrowa Górnicza. However, only five days later he left the club after failing to pass medical tests.

Westbrook signed with KKK MOSiR Krosno of the Polish Basketball League on August 17, 2018.

On March 3, 2022, Westbrook was acquired via available player pool by the Sioux Falls Skyforce. He was then later waived that same day.
