= Sampson Carter =

American basketball player

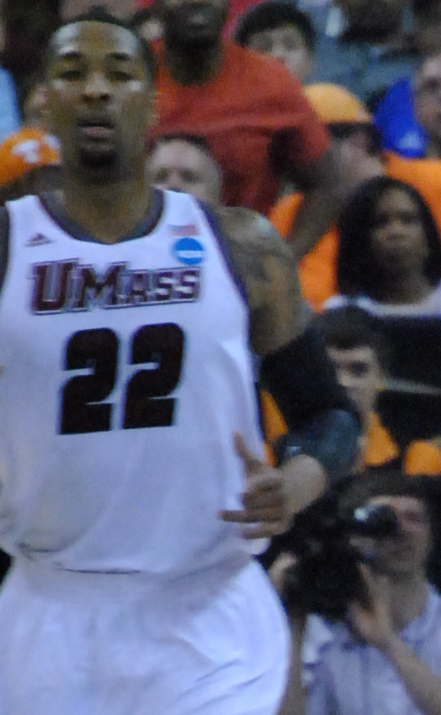
- Carter playing for UMass

Personal information
- Born: September 11, 1990 (age 36) Baton Rouge, Louisiana, U.S.
- Listed height: 6 ft 7 in (2.01 m)
- Listed weight: 220 lb (100 kg)

Career information
- High school: Ridgeway (Memphis, Tennessee)
- College: UMass (2009–2014)
- NBA draft: 2014: undrafted
- Playing career: 2014–2020
- Position: Power forward

Career history
- 2014: CAB Madeira
- 2015: Cupes de Los Pepines
- 2015: Virgilio Castillo (Chola)
- 2016: Caballeros de Culiacán
- 2016–2017: Alab Pilipinas
- 2018–2019: Island Storm
- 2018–2019: Hamilton Honey Badgers
- 2019–2020: Leñadores de Durango

Career highlights
- All-NBL Canada Second Team (2019)
- Stats at Basketball Reference

Sampson Carter (born September 11, 1990) is an American former professional basketball player. He played college basketball for the University of Massachusetts Amherst.

== High school career ==
Carter played high school basketball at Ridgeway High School in Memphis, Tennessee where he led the Roadrunners to their fourth state title with a 34–3 record, being named the MVP the Tennessee State Tournament and also, state MVP, player of the year, all district, and all state after averaging 17 points, seven rebounds and two blocks.

== College career ==
In five years at Massachusetts, Carter averaged 7.1 points, 4.2 rebounds, 0.8 assists and 0.7 steals on 135 games (starting 88).

== Professional career ==
After going undrafted in the 2014 NBA draft, Carter signed with BC Prievidza of the Slovak league on August 16, 2014. However, he left the Slovak team before appearing in a game for them and signed with CAB Madeira from the Portuguese League on October 2. After a short three-game stint in Portugal ended in mid-November, he signed with Dominican outfit Cupes de Los Pepines in February 2015 and then with Club Virgilio Castillo the following month where he played out the 2014–15 campaign.

On October 6, 2015, Carter signed with the Memphis Grizzlies. However, he was waived on October 24 after appearing in six preseason games. On October 31, Carter was selected by the Canton Charge in the fifth round of the 2015 NBA Development League draft. However, he was waived by Canton on November 11. On March 7, 2016, Carter signed with Caballeros de Culiacán of the Mexican CIBACOPA. The next day, he made his debut for Culiacán in a 103–77 loss to the Frayles de Guasave, recording 28 points, four rebounds, four assists and one block in 28 minutes.

On August 2, 2018, Carter signed with the Island Storm of the National Basketball League of Canada (NBL Canada). In the 2018–19 season, Carter averaged 21.9 points, 7.7 rebounds, and 1.9 assists per game. He was named to the All-NBLC Second Team.

== Personal life ==
Carter is the husband of Ashley Carter, the son of Alice Carter, and the brother of UMass Director of Player Personnel Shyrone Chatman. His other siblings include Natasha and Marcus Chatman. While at UMass, he majored in Communications.
