= Dan Nwaelele =

American professional basketball player (born 1984)

Daniel Nwaelele Jr
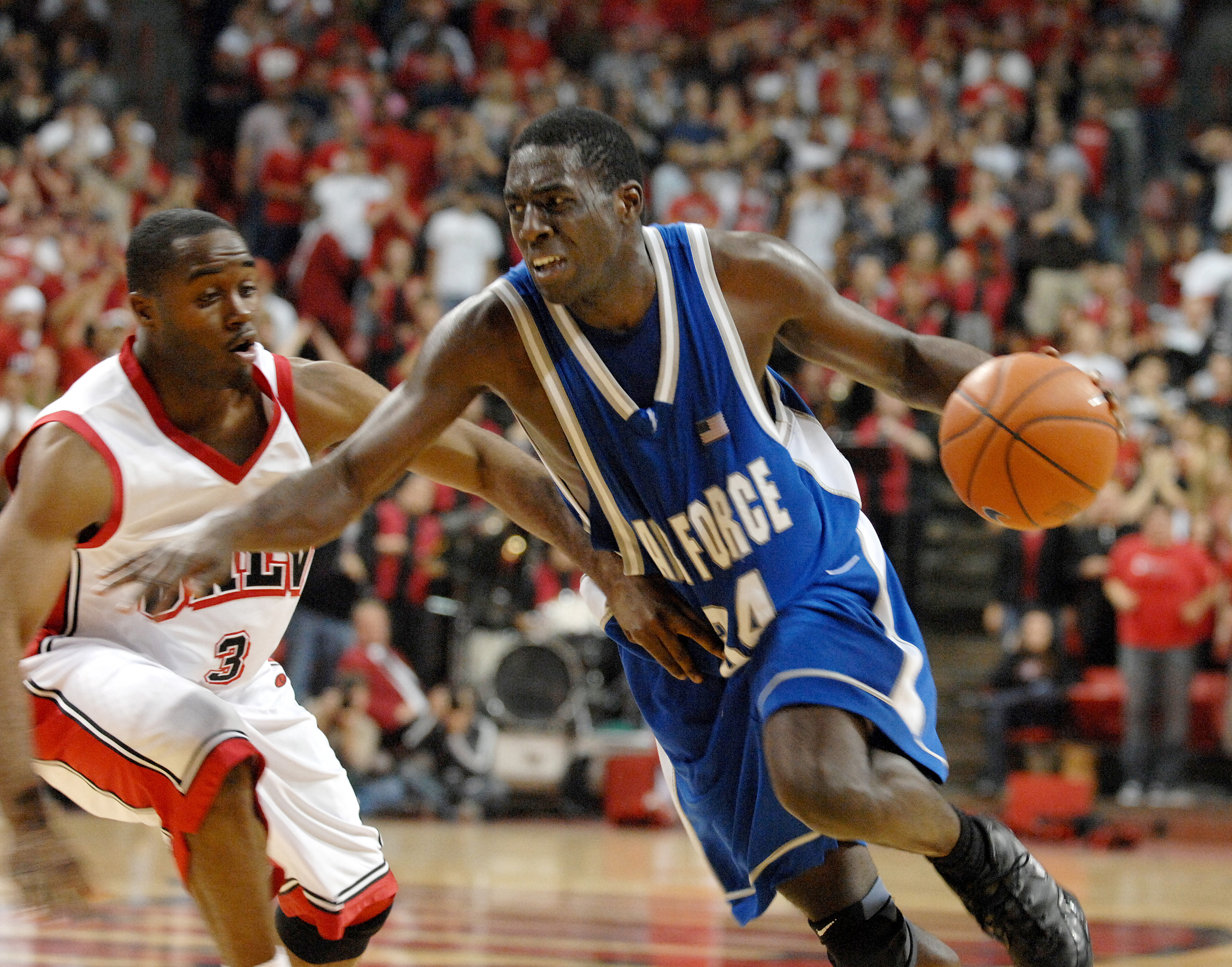
- Nwaelele (right) playing for the Air Force Academy in 2007.

Personal information
- Born: March 5, 1984 (age 42) Oklahoma City, Oklahoma
- Listed height: 6 ft 4 in (1.93 m)
- Listed weight: 205 lb (93 kg)

Career information
- High school: Inglemoor (Kenmore, Washington)
- College: Air Force (2003–2007)
- NBA draft: 2007: undrafted
- Playing career: 2012–2018
- Position: Shooting guard

Career history
- 2012–2016: Santa Cruz Warriors
- 2016–2017: Austin Spurs
- 2017–2018: Levallois Metropolitans

Career highlights
- First-team All-MWC (2007)
- Stats at Basketball Reference

Onyenma Daniel Nwaelele Jr (born March 5, 1984) is an American professional basketball player who last played for Paris-Levallois of the French LNB Pro A. He played college basketball for the Air Force Falcons.

== High school career ==
Nwaelele attended Inglemoor High School where he averaged 17 points and six rebounds per game as a senior an all-state and first-team all-league selection. During his three years at Inglemoor, he became the second leading scorer in Inglemoor history, three-year letterwinner in basketball and three-time team MVP.

== College career ==
After graduating from high school, Nwaelele joined Air Force Falcons. In four seasons, he averaged 9.8 points, 2.4 rebounds and 1.6 assists per game. At the end of his stay at the academy, he was ranked second in program history in three-point field goal percentage with 45.1 percent.

== Professional career ==
After going undrafted in the 2007 NBA draft, Nwaelele was invited by the San Antonio Spurs to their training camp, but couldn't go for his commitment to the Air Force. A year later he signed with the Spurs for the 2008 NBA Summer League before returning to the Air Force.

After concluding his commitment with the Air Force, Nwaelele joined the Santa Cruz Warriors for their 2012 training camp roster after a successful tryout, making the opening day roster.

On September 30, 2013, Nwaelele signed with the Spurs for their training camp, but was waived on October 20. He returned to Santa Cruz afterwards, averaging 7.4 points and 2.5 rebounds in 2013–14.

On January 9, 2015, Santa Cruz reacquired Nwaelele via his Returning Player Rights, but waived him on March 26 before he could appear in a game for them.

On September 28, 2015, Nwaelele signed with the Memphis Grizzlies. However, he was waived on October 5. On November 2, he was reacquired by Santa Cruz. On April 1, he was waived by Santa Cruz after suffering a season-ending injury.

On December 20, 2016, Nwaelele was acquired by the Austin Spurs.

Following the 2016–17 campaign, Nwaelele signed with Paris-Levallois of the French LNB Pro A.

== Military career ==
After finishing his college career at the academy, Nwaelele spent five years in the Air Force being deployed overseas twice. The first one was in Kandahar, Afghanistan, and in his second one, he was stationed in Saudi Arabia.

== Personal life ==
Nwaelele is the son of Dan Sr., and Connie and he has three brothers, Ken, Ike and Andy.
