= Jordan Railey =

American basketball player (born 1992)

Personal information
- Born: April 1, 1992 (age 34) Portland, Oregon, U.S.
- Listed height: 7 ft 0 in (2.13 m)
- Listed weight: 245 lb (111 kg)

Career information
- High school: Beaverton (Beaverton, Oregon)
- College: Iowa State (2010–2012); Washington State (2013–2015)
- NBA draft: 2015: undrafted
- Playing career: 2015–present
- Position: Power forward / center

Career history
- 2015–2017: Delaware 87ers
- 2018–2019: Rochester Razorsharks
- Stats at Basketball Reference

Jordan Leon Railey (born April 1, 1992) is an American former professional basketball player. He played college basketball for Iowa State and Washington State.

== High school career ==
Railey attended Beaverton High School where he averaged 13.9 points and 7.7 rebounds per game while leading the state of Oregon with 111 blocked shots as the team advanced to the second round of playoffs. Scout.com listed him as the third-best center on the West Coast.

== College career ==
Railey began his college career at Iowa State where he averaged 0.5 points and 0.7 rebounds a game in 3.5 minutes of action as a sophomore. On 2012, he transferred to Washington State where he, after sitting out a year per NCAA rules, averaged 6.6 points and 3.2 rebounds as a senior ending as the 16th all-time leader in blocked shots in school history with 62.

== Professional career ==
After going undrafted in the 2015 NBA draft, Railey joined the Philadelphia 76ers for the 2015 NBA Summer League. On August 17, 2015, he signed with KK Igokea of the Bosnian League, but he left the team in October before playing a game for them. On October 26, he was signed by the 76ers only to be instantly waived. On November 2, he was acquired by the Delaware 87ers as an affiliate player from the 76ers. On November 14, he made his professional debut in a 113–101 loss to the Grand Rapids Drive, recording two points and four rebounds in 10 minutes off the bench.

On November 27, 2016, Railey was waived by Delaware. On March 30, 2017, Railey was reacquired by Delaware.

== Personal life ==
The son of Corey and nurse Kim Spaulding, Railey has a younger brother, Darius, who played for Bryant University. He majored in Social Sciences at WSU. Jordan is currently an assistant boys basketball coach at Westview High School.
