= Desmond Jump =

Dominican streetball player

- Born: Pedro Luis Mata Ortega; June 29, 1986 (age 40); La Vega, Dominican Republic
- Occupation: Streetballer
- Known for: Dominican Streetballer
- Basketball career

Career information
- Playing career: 2004–present

Luis Ortega, known as "Desmond Jump", is a Streetball Exhibition Player, based in Spain. He debuted in 2010 with the AND1 sports brand and undertook a tour with the NBA through various European countries. He was champion in Spain in the Slam Dunks contest with a record of 73–0, and champion of the NBA 5 United championship and winner of the NBA Tour slam dunk contest.

Although his stature is short, his specialty is jumping very high, being the player and Dominican to jump more NBA players in the world, including Derrick William, Dwight Howard, Jrue Holiday, Nikola Pekovic, Corey Brewer, Muggsy Bogues and Al Horford.

== Career ==
He represented the Dominican Republic at the Novaschool Campus in the province of Malaga in 2011 along with Felipe Reyes and Lennon Álvarez. He is a regular guest at street basketball events in Spain like Lavapiés 3x3 and 5x5, NBA 5 United Tour, NBA 3X, and 3X3 NBA BBVA Experience.

In 2017, he represented Italy in Jump 10 held in China. In his career, he has been able to play alongside A C Green, Bruce Bowen, Rolando Blackman, Ron Harper, Derrick William, among others. He has vaulted over 5 people to perform a slam dunk.

== Trajectory ==
- 2004-2006: Ayers Rock (Italy)
- 2007: Gerindote
- 2008-2009: Los Angeles
- 2010: Virgen del Camino
- 2010-2014: Sign with And1
- 2011-2015: Tour NBA 2011-2015
- 2017: Italy on Jump 10 (China)

=== List of NBA Players who has jumped ===
- Derrick Williams / 6.8 ft
- Dwight Howard / 6.11 ft
- Jrue Holiday /1.93 ft
- Nikola Peković / 6.10 ft
- Corey Brewer / 2.06 ft
- Muggsy Bogues / 5.3 ft
- Al Horford / 6.1 ft

== Championships ==
- Champion of the NBA 5 United Tour in Madrid (Adidas) 2011
