= NBA 5 United Tour =

The NBA 5 United Tour is a 5-on-5 tournament played by amateur teams who sign up for the occasion. It is a competition, entertainment and marketing activity promoted by the NBA in Europe. The NBA 5 United Tour was a tour organized by Adidas and other brands for the exhibition of basketball, streetball, dunk contests, where active NBA athletes have participated as guests. It has been held in major cities such as Madrid, Barcelona, Moscow, Rome, Paris, Milan, Istanbul, London, Athens, among others. Some of the athletes who have been invited are A C Green, Derrick Williams, Josh Smith, Dwight Howard, Jrue Holiday, Nikola Peković, Corey Brewer, Muggsy Bogues, Desmond Jump and Al Horford.

The first season was held in 2009. It would be discontinued in 2011, and rebooted as NBA 3X from 2015 on Spain.

== Events by year ==
=== 2009 ===
In 2009, the adidas NBA 5 United Tour, which began in Athens and will arrive in Istanbul on July 11 after Madrid and Rome, will end in London on September 12 and 13.

In Madrid, it took place on June 27 and 28. The event was sponsored by MARCA, MARCA.com and Radio MARCA and featured the Jazz cheerleading group, the 'Utah Jazz's Nu Skin Jazz Dancers', as well as the Blazers point guard, Sergio Rodríguez, and the Real Madrid center, Felipe Reyes and Alex Mumbrú.

=== 2010 ===
On Saturday, June 12 and Sunday, June 13, the city of Milan was a sporting protagonist by hosting the 2010 edition of this event carried out by Adidas and the National Basketball Association, in its fourth edition that had the Italian city as the first of 3 European stages (the others will be in Madrid on June 26 and 27 and Paris on September 4 and 5). New York Knicks dancers performed in various performances that they also performed during New York games. The athletes invited to this event were Nicolò Melli, Pietro Aradori and the NBA player Tracy McGrady.

=== 2011 ===
It took place on September 17 and 18 at the Place de l'Hôtel de Ville in Paris. It did not have the participation of any NBA athlete, but the dancers of the Boston Celtics were present.

NBA Fan Zone, organized by NBA Italia with the participation of Adidas, Vodafone and Kraft, also brought United 5, which featured dancers from the 2010 NBA champions, the Dallas Mavericks. The first stop of the 2011 NBA 5 United Tour was in Milan at Piazza del Cannone on June 4 and 5, where Atlanta Howks NBA player Josh Smith and the Charlotte Bobcats dance team, the Lady Cats, were part of the show. NBA 5 United was sponsored by the Municipality of Milan, Adidas, EA Sports, Footlocker, Hannspree, Kraft, Vodafone, Microsoft Xbox and Radio Deejay.

For his visit to Spain, activities in Barcelona took place at Avenida María Cristina in Barcelona on June 11 and 12, with Josh Smith's appearance sponsored by adidas and performances by the Phoenix Suns dance team. It continues in the vicinity of the Santiago Bernabéu, Madrid was the venue for the NBA 5 United Tour 2011 on June 18 and 19 with the backing and support of BBVA, the competition's official bank, and the NBA. EA SPORTS, Footlocker and Hannspree will support the NBA 5 United Tour, in conjunction with Kia and media partner Marca. The event was attended by Dwight Howard, Jrue Holiday and the official dance team of the Milwaukee Bucks.

The NBA 5 United basketball tournament was held in Istanbul on June 4–5. It has been reported that a surprise NBA player and the New Orleans Hornets dance team will take part in the tournament, which will be held in Caddebostan. NTV, Virgin Radio, Coca-Cola Company, EA Sports, Powerade and Hürriyet will also support the Istanbul leg of the adidas NBA 5 United Tour. EA Sports and The Coca-Cola Company hosted daily competitions featuring EA Sports' popular NBA Live 09 games, and the on-field competition will continue throughout the day in the virtual environment. Dwight Howard will meet fans across the continent including stops at the NBA 5 United Tour in Moscow.

It would be in Rome at the Flaminio Stadium on June 28 and 29. The fans present on the stage enjoyed the performance of the Phoenix Suns Dance Team.

== Special guests ==
=== NBA players ===
- A.C. Green
- Derrick Williams
- Josh Smith
- Dwight Howard: Moscow 2011
- Jrue Holiday
- Nikola Peković
- Corey Brewer
- Muggsy Bogues
- Desmond Jump: Madrid 2011
- Al Horford
- Brook Lopez: London 2009
- Antawn Jamison: Paris 2010
