= Greg Stiemsma =

American basketball player (born 1985)

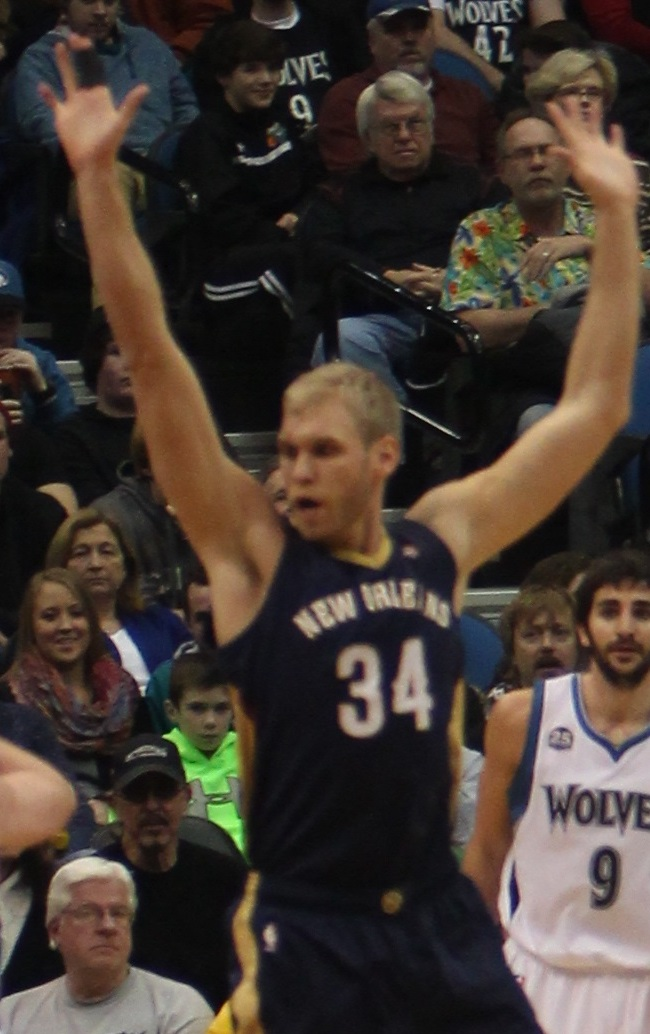
- Stiemsma with the New Orleans Pelicans in 2014

Wisconsin Badgers men's basketball
- Title: Director of player development
- League: Big Ten Conference

Personal information
- Born: September 26, 1985 (age 41) Randolph, Wisconsin, U.S.
- Listed height: 6 ft 11 in (2.11 m)
- Listed weight: 260 lb (118 kg)

Career information
- High school: Randolph (Randolph, Wisconsin)
- College: Wisconsin (2004–2008)
- NBA draft: 2008: undrafted
- Playing career: 2008–2015
- Position: Center
- Number: 54, 34
- Coaching career: 2019–present

Career history

Playing
- 2008–2009: Oyak Renault
- 2009: Seoul SK Knights
- 2009–2010: Sioux Falls Skyforce
- 2010–2011: Türk Telekom
- 2011: Sioux Falls Skyforce
- 2011–2012: Boston Celtics
- 2012–2013: Minnesota Timberwolves
- 2013–2014: New Orleans Pelicans
- 2014–2015: Toronto Raptors

Coaching
- 2019–2021: Minnesota Timberwolves (Player Development Associate)
- 2021-2024: San Antonio Spurs (Video Assistant)
- 2024-present: Wisconsin Badgers (Director of Player Development)

Career highlights
- NBA D-League Defensive Player of the Year (2010)
- Stats at NBA.com
- Stats at Basketball Reference
Medals
Men's basketball
Representing United States
Pan American Games
Bronze medal – third place	2011 Guadalajara	National team

Gregory Ross Stiemsma (/ˈstiːmsmə/; born September 26, 1985) is an American former professional basketball player who spent four seasons in the National Basketball Association (NBA). He played high school basketball for Randolph High School and college basketball for the University of Wisconsin–Madison, before going undrafted in the 2008 NBA draft. A 6'11" center, Stiemsma was known for his defense and shot blocking ability during his playing days.

== High school career ==
Stiemsma attended Randolph High School in Randolph, Wisconsin where he led the Rockets to Division 4 state titles as a sophomore, junior and senior. As a junior in 2002–03, he earned first-team all-state honors after averaging 14.5 points, 8.3 rebounds, 5.5 blocks and 2.7 assists per game.

In November 2003, he signed a National Letter of Intent to play college basketball for the University of Wisconsin–Madison.

As a senior in 2003–04, he was limited to just 18 games due to right knee injury but still managed to earn third-team Associated Press all-state honors after averaging 11.6 points, 8.3 rebounds and 4.1 blocks per game.

== College career ==
In his freshman season at Wisconsin, Stiemsma played just 10 games after missing the first six weeks of the season with a right foot injury. In those 10 games, he averaged just 1.1 points per game.

In his sophomore season, he was again disrupted, managing just 16 games after he was deemed ineligible to play during the second semester due to poor grades. Stiemsma was later diagnosed with depression as a result of his poor academic performance. Despite this, he still finished the season first on the team in total blocks with 24. In those 16 games, he averaged 2.8 points, 2.8 rebounds and 1.5 blocks per game.

In his junior season, he played out his first full season, playing 34 of the 36 games while averaging 2.2 points, 3.1 rebounds and 1.1 assists per game.

In his senior season, led the team with 40 blocks, while recording four double-digit scoring performances, including a career-high 14 points in the NCAA tournament against Kansas State. In 35 games, he averaged 3.5 points, 3.1 rebounds and 1.1 blocks per game.

== Professional career ==
=== Early years (2008–2011) ===
==== 2008–09 season ====
Stiemsma went undrafted in the 2008 NBA draft. In August 2008, he signed with Oyak Renault of Turkey for the 2008–09 season. In February 2009, he left Oyak and signed with the Seoul SK Knights of South Korea for the rest of the season. On April 11, 2009, he was acquired by the Sioux Falls Skyforce of the NBA Development League.

==== 2009–10 season ====
In July 2009, Stiemsma joined the Memphis Grizzlies for the 2009 NBA Summer League. On November 1, 2009, he was reacquired by the Sioux Falls Skyforce. On April 13, 2010, he signed with the Minnesota Timberwolves for the rest of the season.

==== 2010–11 season ====
In July 2010, Stiemsma joined the Minnesota Timberwolves for the 2010 NBA Summer League. On September 10, 2010, he was waived by the Timberwolves before appearing in a game for them. Later that month, he signed with the Cleveland Cavaliers. However, he was later waived by the Cavaliers on October 2, 2010. Three days later, he signed a two-year deal with Türk Telekom of the Turkish Basketball League.

==== 2011–12 season ====
On August 21, 2011, Stiemsma signed with BC Sokhumi of the Georgian Superliga but left before appearing in a game for them. On November 2, 2011, he was reacquired by the Sioux Falls Skyforce.

=== Boston Celtics (2011–2012) ===
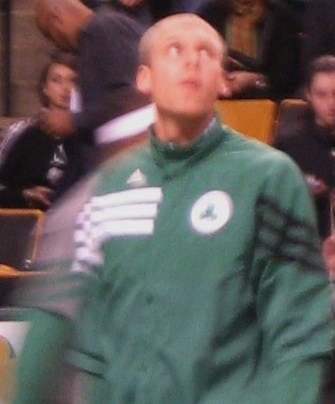
Stiemsma with the Boston Celtics

On December 9, 2011, Stiemsma signed with the Boston Celtics. On December 28, 2011, he made his NBA debut, recording 2 points, 6 blocks and 4 rebounds in a 78–97 loss to the New Orleans Hornets. In March 2012, he signed a sponsorship deal with Nike.

On June 29, 2012, the Celtics extended a $1.05 million qualifying offer to Stiemsma, thereby making him a restricted free agent.

=== Minnesota Timberwolves (2012–2013) ===
On July 21, 2012, Stiemsma received an offer sheet from the Minnesota Timberwolves. Two days later, the Celtics withdrew their qualifying offer to Stiemsma, clearing the way for the Timberwolves to sign him as an unrestricted free agent. On August 2, 2012, he officially signed with the Timberwolves.

On July 7, 2013, he was waived by the Timberwolves.

=== New Orleans Pelicans (2013–2014) ===
On July 10, 2013, Stiemsma signed with the New Orleans Pelicans. On April 14, 2014, he was waived by the Pelicans.

=== Toronto Raptors (2014–2015) ===
On September 4, 2014, Stiemsma signed with the Toronto Raptors.

On September 24, 2015, Stiemsma signed with the Orlando Magic. However, due to an Achilles' tendon strain, Stiemsma was prevented from playing early in the preseason, appearing in a total of two exhibition games for the Magic, collecting 1.5 rebounds in 8.3 minutes per game. He was subsequently waived by the Magic on October 22 prior to the start of the regular season.

On September 12, 2016, Stiemsma signed with the Portland Trail Blazers, but was waived on October 21 after appearing in four preseason games.

== Coaching career ==
=== Minnesota Timberwolves (2019–2021) ===
On September 12, 2019, the Minnesota Timberwolves announced that they had named Stiemsma as player development associate.

=== San Antonio Spurs (2021–2024) ===
Stiemsma worked as a video assistant in the film room with the San Antonio Spurs in 2021. He was part of their 2022 Summer League coaching staff and later received a promotion in Player Development.

=== Wisconsin Badgers (2024–present) ===
Stiemsma was hired as the Director of Player Development for the Wisconsin Badger's men's basketball team in July 2024.

== Career statistics ==
Legend
GP	Games played	GS	Games started	MPG	Minutes per game
FG%	Field goal percentage	3P%	3-point field goal percentage	FT%	Free throw percentage
RPG	Rebounds per game	APG	Assists per game	SPG	Steals per game
BPG	Blocks per game	PPG	Points per game	**Bold**	Career high

=== NBA ===
==== Regular season ====
Year	Team	GP	GS	MPG	FG%	3P%	FT%	RPG	APG	SPG	BPG	PPG
2011–12	Boston	55	3	13.9	.545	.000	.707	3.2	.5	**.7**	**1.5**	2.9
2012–13	Minnesota	**76**	19	15.9	.457	.000	**.768**	3.4	.4	.6	1.2	**4.0**
2013–14	New Orleans	55	**20**	**18.3**	.574	.000	.594	**4.1**	**.7**	.6	1.0	2.9
2014–15	Toronto	17	0	3.9	**.750**	.000	.500	.9	.2	.1	.0	.8
Career		203	42	15.0	.509	.000	.705	3.3	.5	.6	1.1	3.2

==== Playoffs ====
Year	Team	GP	GS	MPG	FG%	3P%	FT%	RPG	APG	SPG	BPG	PPG
2012	Boston	19	0	7.5	.667	.000	.667	2.2	.3	.2	.6	1.5

=== NBA D-League ===
==== Regular season ====
Year	Team	GP	GS	MPG	FG%	3P%	FT%	RPG	APG	SPG	BPG	PPG
2008–09	Sioux Falls	1	0	14.0	.333	–	**1.000**	6.0	.0	.0	1.0	6.0
2009–10	Sioux Falls	**45**	**44**	28.0	**.541**	.000	.821	7.1	**1.2**	.7	3.6	8.8
2011–12	Sioux Falls	4	4	**36.0**	.500	–	.667	**10.8**	1.0	**1.3**	**4.5**	**9.0**
Career		50	48	28.3	.536	.000	.804	7.4	1.2	.7	3.6	8.7

==== Playoffs ====
Year	Team	GP	GS	MPG	FG%	3P%	FT%	RPG	APG	SPG	BPG	PPG
2009–10	Sioux Falls	3	3	31.0	.577	–	.882	10.7	.7	1.0	4.3	15.0

=== College ===
Year	Team	GP	GS	MPG	FG%	3P%	FT%	RPG	APG	SPG	BPG	PPG
2004–05	Wisconsin	10	0	2.7	**.833**	–	.500	.6	.0	.1	.2	1.1
2005–06	Wisconsin	16	0	**11.7**	.553	.000	.429	2.8	.9	**.4**	**1.5**	2.8
2006–07	Wisconsin	34	0	9.9	.500	–	.808	1.6	**1.1**	.1	.9	2.2
2007–08	Wisconsin	**35**	**7**	11.5	.548	–	**.826**	**3.1**	.7	**.4**	1.1	**3.5**
Career		95	7	10.0	.545	.000	.759	2.3	.8	.2	1.0	2.7

== International career ==
In 2011, Stiemsma earned a bronze medal with Team USA at the Pan American Games where he led the tournament in field goal percentage (.889) and was second in the tournament in blocked shots with 11.

== Personal life ==
Stiemsma is the son of Rick and Sharry Stiemsma, and has one sister, Erin. He and his wife Emily have two daughters and one son together. He is of Dutch origin. He has admitted to suffering from depression.
