= Jump 10 =

Basketball communication platform

The JUMP 10 World Hoops Challenge is a basketball communication platform with an international standard, through which national fans can compare themselves with world-class players. At the same time, players from other countries can gain insight into the development of the Chinese basketball industry.

JUMP 10 is all about bringing together the players from all over the country, after receiving intense training from a team of professional coaches, they are expected to play against elite teams from various countries. The meaning of the number 10 is inspired by the collective brotherhood of the 5X5 basketball competition. Also represents the height of the court in feet. The full name "JUMP 10" refers to elevating your game through one of the most crucial moves in basketball.

Its first edition was held in 2016 with Chinese players, and has subsequently had the participation of various streetball figures such as Desmond Jump.

== Events by year ==
=== 2016 ===
In 2016, the Venados de Mazatlán entered the competition for the first time to represent Mexico. On that occasion, the Aztec quintet surprised the competition by finishing as champions.

=== 2017 ===
The JUMP 10 World Hoops Challenge took place at Shanghai's Rucker Park starting Thursday. The opening ceremony was attended by Giannis Antetokounmpo of the Milwaukee Bucks.

Entering its second year, the four-day tournament features a total of 24 teams. Four are from China, while the rest represent countries like the US, Germany, France, Spain, Australia, etc. They will compete for a total prize pool of US$200,000.

During the tournament, there will be a dunk contest starring stars like Lipek, Take Fly, Chris Air, etc. Among the participating countries, Team USA bested the competition and won first place. They were then followed by Team Canada at second place; and Team Mexico in third place.

=== 2018 ===
The event is August 16–19, 2018. The winning team raises US$100,000. Finalists raise US$30,000.

Loughborough Riders obtuvo la victoria en el primer Torneo de Verano Jump 10 con sede en el Reino Unido en la Universidad de Loughborough y representa al equipo del Reino Unido.

=== 2019 ===
Tournament sees teams from 12 countries battling it out for over four days for a huge $100,000 grand prize.

In the grand final, Mexico met a powerful Canada that went over the top in the opening quarter by scoring 21 points against the Greens' 12 points. The Mexicans responded and reversed the numbers in the second period.

The game had to be decided in extra time and it was there that the Canadians got permission to lift the Jump 10 trophy after winning a brilliant 4–2 in their favor.

The podium was complemented by the USA Court King team, which finished in third position by defeating The UK.

== Podium ==
Editions and champions
Editions	1st place	2nd place	3rd place
2016	Mexico		
2017	USA	Canada	México
2018			
2019	Canada	Mexico	USA
