= 2012–13 Minnesota Timberwolves season =

NBA professional basketball team season

- Head coach: Rick Adelman
- President: David Kahn
- General manager: David Kahn
- Owner: Glen Taylor
- Arena: Target Center

Results
- Record: 31–51 (.378)
- Place: Division: 5th (Northwest); Conference: 12th (Western)
- Playoff finish: Did not qualify
- Stats at Basketball Reference

Local media
- Television: Fox Sports North
- Radio: WCCO

The 2012–13 Minnesota Timberwolves season was the 24th season for the franchise in the National Basketball Association (NBA). The team missed the playoffs for the 9th straight season, but won at least 30 games for the first time since Kevin Garnett was traded.

== Key dates ==
- June 28, 2012: The 2012 NBA draft took place at the Prudential Center in Newark, New Jersey.

== Draft ==
Round	Pick	Player	Position	Nationality	College
2	58	Robbie Hummel	PF	United States	Purdue (Sr.)

== Roster ==
2012–13 Minnesota Timberwolves roster
Players

Pos.	No.	Player	Height	Weight	DOB	From
G	11	José Juan Barea	6 ft 0 in (1.83 m)	178 lb (81 kg)	1984–06–26	Northeastern
F	10	Chase Budinger	6 ft 7 in (2.01 m)	209 lb (95 kg)	1988–05–22	Arizona
F	33	Dante Cunningham	6 ft 8 in (2.03 m)	221 lb (100 kg)	1987–04–22	Villanova
F	15	Mickael Gelabale	6 ft 7 in (2.01 m)	215 lb (98 kg)	1983–05–22	France
C	20	Chris Johnson	6 ft 11 in (2.11 m)	210 lb (95 kg)	1985–07–15	LSU
F	47	Andrei Kirilenko	6 ft 9 in (2.06 m)	220 lb (100 kg)	1981–02–18	Russia
G	8	Malcolm Lee	6 ft 5 in (1.96 m)	200 lb (91 kg)	1990–05–22	UCLA
F/C	42	Kevin Love	6 ft 10 in (2.08 m)	243 lb (110 kg)	1988–09–07	UCLA
C	14	Nikola Peković	6 ft 11 in (2.11 m)	285 lb (129 kg)	1986–01–03	Montenegro
G	13	Luke Ridnour	6 ft 2 in (1.88 m)	175 lb (79 kg)	1981–02–13	Oregon
G	3	Brandon Roy	6 ft 6 in (1.98 m)	215 lb (98 kg)	1984–07–23	Washington
G	9	Ricky Rubio	6 ft 4 in (1.93 m)	185 lb (84 kg)	1990–10–21	Spain
G	1	Alexey Shved	6 ft 6 in (1.98 m)	187 lb (85 kg)	1988–12–16	Russia
C	34	Greg Stiemsma	6 ft 11 in (2.11 m)	260 lb (118 kg)	1985–09–26	Wisconsin
F	7	Derrick Williams	6 ft 8 in (2.03 m)	240 lb (109 kg)	1991–05–25	Arizona

Coaches
Head coach
- Rick Adelman
Assistant(s)
- Terry Porter
- Jack Sikma
- T. R. Dunn
- David Adelman

Legend
- (DP) Unsigned draft pick
- (FA) Free agent
- (S) Suspended
- (DL) On assignment to D-League affiliate
- Injured

Roster
Updated: 2014–04–08

== Pre-season ==
2012 pre-season game log
Pre-season: 5–2 (home: 4–0; road: 1–2)

Game	Date	Team	Score	High points	High rebounds	High assists	Location Attendance	Record
1	October 10	Indiana	W 84–70	Budinger & Peković (14)	Kevin Love (8)	Barea & Shved (4)	Fargodome; 9,163	1–0
2	October 12	@ Indiana	L 91–96	Derrick Williams (25)	Kevin Love (9)	Will Conroy (6)	Bankers Life Fieldhouse; 10,794	1–1
3	October 13	Chicago	W 82–75	Nikola Peković (16)	Nikola Peković (17)	Brandon Roy (4)	Target Center; 12,251	2–1
4	October 16	Maccabi Haifa	W 114–81	Kevin Love (24)	Nikola Peković (9)	José Juan Barea (7)	Target Center; 11,192	3–1
5	October 19	@ Chicago	L 81–92	Cunningham, Kirilenko (12)	Greg Stiemsma (7)	Roy, Amundson & Conroy (3)	United Center; 21,418	3–2
6	October 24	Detroit	W 95–76	Chase Budinger (21)	Dante Cunningham (14)	José Juan Barea (7)	MTS Centre; 12,163	4–2
7	October 26	@ Milwaukee	W 100–76	Chase Budinger (20)	Andrei Kirilenko (10)	Alexey Shved (8)	Resch Center; 4,165	5–2

2012–13 season schedule

== Regular season ==
=== Game log ===
2012–13 game log
Total: 31–51 (Home: 20–21; Road: 11–30)
November: 7–8 (home: 4–3; road: 3–5)

Game	Date	Team	Score	High points	High rebounds	High assists	Location Attendance	Record
1	November 2	Sacramento	W 92–80	José Juan Barea (21)	Dante Cunningham (9)	Brandon Roy (6)	Target Center; 19,356	1–0
2	November 4	@ Toronto	L 86–105	Andrei Kirilenko (17)	Derrick Williams (8)	Luke Ridnour (5)	Air Canada Centre; 16,754	1-1
3	November 5	@ Brooklyn	W 107–96	Nikola Peković (21)	Dante Cunningham (11)	Brandon Roy (7)	Barclays Center; 14,017	2–1
4	November 7	Orlando	W 90–75	Luke Ridnour (19)	Derrick Williams (6)	Brandon Roy (9)	Target Center; 17,121	3–1
5	November 9	Indiana	W 96–94	Chase Budinger (18)	Nikola Peković (8)	Alexey Shved (7)	Target Center; 18,222	4–1
6	November 10	@ Chicago	L 80–87	Nikola Peković (18)	Andrei Kirilenko (12)	Andrei Kirilenko (7)	United Center; 21,974	4–2
7	November 12	@ Dallas	W 90–82	Nikola Peković (20)	Andrei Kirilenko (11)	Luke Ridnour (7)	American Airlines Center; 19,322	5–2
8	November 14	Charlotte	L 87–89	Andrei Kirilenko (26)	Andrei Kirilenko (12)	Luke Ridnour (10)	Target Center; 13,272	5–3
9	November 16	Golden State	L 98–106	Derrick Williams (23)	Derrick Williams (7)	Alexey Shved (7)	Target Center; 16,013	5–4
10	November 21	Denver	L 94–101	Kevin Love (34)	Kevin Love (14)	Luke Ridnour (6)	Target Center; 16,879	5-5
11	November 23	@ Portland	L 95–103	Kevin Love (24)	Kevin Love (13)	Andrei Kirilenko (5)	Rose Garden; 20,555	5–6
12	November 24	@ Golden State	L 85–96	Nikola Peković (17)	Kevin Love (15)	José Juan Barea (10)	Oracle Arena; 19,084	5–7
13	November 27	@ Sacramento	W 97–89	Kevin Love (23)	Kevin Love (24)	José Juan Barea (6)	Power Balance Pavilion; 10,741	6–7
14	November 28	@ L. A. Clippers	L 95–101	Kevin Love (19)	Kevin Love (12)	Luke Ridnour (7)	Staples Center; 19,060	6–8
15	November 30	Milwaukee	W 95–85	Ridnour & Shved (16)	Nikola Peković (16)	Barea & Shved (5)	Target Center; 16,418	7–8

December : 7–5 (home: 5–1; road: 2–4)

Game	Date	Team	Score	High points	High rebounds	High assists	Location Attendance	Record
16	December 4	@ Philadelphia	W 105–88	Alexey Shved (17)	Howard & Love (10)	José Juan Barea (10)	Wells Fargo Center; 13,986	8-8
17	December 5	@ Boston	L 94–104	Kevin Love (19)	Kevin Love (13)	Luke Ridnour (5)	TD Garden; 18,624	8–9
18	December 7	Cleveland	W 91–73	Kevin Love (36)	Kevin Love (13)	Luke Ridnour (7)	Target Center; 16,623	9-9
19	December 12	Denver	W 108–105	Nikola Peković (22)	Kevin Love (14)	José Juan Barea (8)	Target Center; 16,444	10–9
20	December 14	@ New Orleans	W 113–102	Nikola Peković (31)	Andrei Kirilenko (11)	Luke Ridnour (10)	New Orleans Arena; 14,671	11–9
21	December 15	Dallas	W 114–106	Nikola Peković (21)	Andrei Kirilenko (10)	Ricky Rubio (9)	Target Center; 18,173	12–9
22	December 17	@ Orlando	L 93–102	Kevin Love (23)	Kevin Love (15)	Barea & Kirilenko (6)	Amway Center; 16,992	12–10
23	December 18	@ Miami	L 92–103	Andrei Kirilenko (22)	Kevin Love (18)	Alexey Shved (8)	American Airlines Arena; 19,862	12–11
24	December 20	Oklahoma City	W 99–93	Kevin Love (28)	Kevin Love (11)	Alexey Shved (12)	Target Center; 17,114	13–11
25	December 23	@ New York	L 91–94	Nikola Peković (21)	Nikola Peković (17)	Luke Ridnour (5)	Madison Square Garden; 19,033	13–12
26	December 26	Houston	L 84–87	José Juan Barea (18)	Kevin Love (12)	Luke Ridnour (4)	Target Center; 20,340	13-13
27	December 29	Phoenix	W 111–107	Nikola Peković (28)	Kevin Love (18)	Alexey Shved (10)	Target Center; 19,356	14–13

January : 3–12 (home: 2–4; road: 1–8)

Game	Date	Team	Score	High points	High rebounds	High assists	Location Attendance	Record
28	January 2	@ Utah	L 84–106	Love & Shved (13)	Kevin Love (10)	José Juan Barea (4)	EnergySolutions Arena; 19,120	14-14
29	January 3	@ Denver	W 101–97	Barea & Shved (17)	Kevin Love (17)	Barea & Shved (5)	Pepsi Center; 16,921	15–14
30	January 5	Portland	L 97–102	Nikola Peković (21)	Nikola Peković (15)	Barea & Shved (7)	Target Center; 16,220	15-15
31	January 8	Atlanta	W 108–103	Nikola Peković (25)	Nikola Peković (18)	Ricky Rubio (8)	Target Center; 15,988	16–15
32	January 9	@ Oklahoma City	L 84–106	Alexey Shved (18)	Derrick Williams (11)	Ricky Rubio (7)	Chesapeake Energy Arena; 18,203	16-16
33	January 11	@ New Orleans	L 92–104	Luke Ridnour (20)	Dante Cunningham (9)	Alexey Shved (7)	New Orleans Arena; 13,538	16–17
34	January 13	@ San Antonio	L 88–106	José Juan Barea (4)	Andrei Kirilenko (22)	Barea & Ridnour (6)	AT&T Center; 18,144	16–18
35	January 14	@ Dallas	L 98–113	José Juan Barea (21)	Nikola Peković (12)	Ricky Rubio (6)	American Airlines Center; 19,486	16–19
36	January 17	L. A. Clippers	L 77–90	Luke Ridnour (21)	Nikola Peković (9)	Ricky Rubio (6)	Target Center; 16,198	16–20
37	January 19	Houston	W 92–79	Andrei Kirilenko (21)	Andrei Kirilenko (11)	Ricky Rubio (6)	Target Center; 16,799	17–20
38	January 21	@ Atlanta	L 96–104	Derrick Williams (17)	Andrei Kirilenko (6)	José Juan Barea (7)	Philips Arena; 13,808	17–21
39	January 23	Brooklyn	L 83–91	Andrei Kirilenko (15)	Johnson, Kirilenko & Williams (6)	José Juan Barea (8)	Target Center; 15,785	17–22
40	January 25	@ Washington	L 101–114	Derrick Williams (18)	Derrick Williams (11)	Rubio & Stiemsma (6)	Verizon Center; 14,095	17–23
41	January 26	@ Charlotte	L 101–102	Luke Ridnour (22)	Ridnour & Stiemsma (7)	Ricky Rubio (8)	Time Warner Cable Arena; 15,397	17–24
42	January 30	L. A. Clippers	L 90–96	Nikola Peković (17)	Nikola Peković (12)	Barea, Kirilenko, & Rubio (4)	Target Center; 15,312	17–25

February : 3–10 (home: 2–6; road: 1–4)

Game	Date	Team	Score	High points	High rebounds	High assists	Location Attendance	Record
43	February 1	L. A. Lakers	L 100–111	Alexey Shved (18)	Pekovic & Williams (9)	Ricky Rubio (7)	Target Center; 18,547	17–26
44	February 2	New Orleans	W 115–86	Dante Cunningham (18)	Nikola Peković (7)	Alexey Shved (8)	Target Center; 16,289	18–26
45	February 4	Portland	L 98–100	Dante Cunningham (23)	Nikola Peković (11)	Ricky Rubio (14)	Target Center; 13,446	18–27
46	February 6	San Antonio	L 94–104	Nikola Peković (21)	Derrick Williams (12)	Ricky Rubio (11)	Target Center; 15,224	18–28
47	February 8	New York	L 94–100	Luke Ridnour (20)	Nikola Peković (11)	Ricky Rubio (11)	Target Center; 16,502	18–29
48	February 10	@ Memphis	L 88–105	Ridnour & Rubio (17)	Pekovic & Williams (6)	Alexey Shved (9)	FedExForum; 16,023	18–30
49	February 11	@ Cleveland	W 100–92	Luke Ridnour (21)	Nikola Peković (10)	Ricky Rubio (10)	Quicken Loans Arena; 11,556	19–30
50	February 13	Utah	L 93–97	Derrick Williams (24)	Derrick Williams (16)	Ricky Rubio (10)	Target Center; 13,117	19–31
All-Star Break
51	February 20	Philadelphia	W 94–87	Nikola Peković (27)	Nikola Peković (18)	Ricky Rubio (6)	Target Center; 14,439	20–31
52	February 22	@ Oklahoma City	L 111–127	Alexey Shved (17)	Greg Stiemsma (6)	Ricky Rubio (9)	Chesapeake Energy Arena; 18,203	20–32
53	February 24	Golden State	L 99–100	Derrick Williams (23)	Derrick Williams (12)	Ricky Rubio (11)	Target Center; 18,033	20–33
54	February 26	@ Phoenix	L 83–84 (OT)	Derrick Williams (21)	Derrick Williams (11)	Ricky Rubio (10)	US Airways Center; 14,973	20–34
55	February 28	@ L. A. Lakers	L 94–116	José Juan Barea (23)	Derrick Williams (8)	Ricky Rubio (13)	Staples Center; 18,997	20–35

March : 6–11 (home: 4–5; road: 2–6)

Game	Date	Team	Score	High points	High rebounds	High assists	Location Attendance	Record
56	March 2	@ Portland	L 94–109	Derrick Williams (23)	Ricky Rubio (9)	Ricky Rubio (9)	Rose Garden; 20,390	20–36
57	March 4	Miami	L 81–97	Derrick Williams (25)	Dante Cunningham (11)	Ricky Rubio (8)	Target Center; 18,391	20–37
58	March 6	Washington	W 87–82	Derrick Williams (16)	Derrick Williams (8)	Ricky Rubio (11)	Target Center; 13,233	21–37
59	March 9	@ Denver	L 88–111	Mickaël Gelabale (19)	Chris Johnson (8)	Ricky Rubio (6)	Pepsi Center; 18,823	21–38
60	March 10	Dallas	L 77–100	Derrick Williams (18)	Derrick Williams (9)	Luke Ridnour (5)	Target Center; 15,209	21–39
61	March 12	San Antonio	W 107–83	Ricky Rubio (21)	Ricky Rubio (13)	Ricky Rubio (12)	Target Center; 14,219	22–39
62	March 13	@ Indiana	L 91–107	Ricky Rubio (21)	Greg Stiemsma (9)	Ricky Rubio (10)	Bankers Life Fieldhouse; 14,187	22–40
63	March 15	@ Houston	L 100–108	Derrick Williams (19)	Mickaël Gelabale (7)	Ricky Rubio (7)	Toyota Center; 18,046	22–41
64	March 17	New Orleans	W 97–95	Derrick Williams (28)	Derrick Williams (7)	Luke Ridnour (6)	Target Center; 14,246	23–41
65	March 18	@ Memphis	L 77–92	Alexey Shved (12)	Mickaël Gelabale (7)	Luke Ridnour (3)	FedExForum; 16,378	23–42
66	March 21	@ Sacramento	L 98–101	Nikola Peković (18)	Nikola Peković (12)	Ricky Rubio (9)	Power Balance Pavilion; 12,176	23–43
67	March 22	@ Phoenix	W 117–86	Andrei Kirilenko (20)	Greg Stiemsma (10)	Ricky Rubio (8)	US Airways Center; 16,155	24–43
68	March 24	Chicago	L 97–104	Derrick Williams (28)	Nikola Peković (8)	Ricky Rubio (8)	Target Center; 17,330	24–44
69	March 26	@ Detroit	W 105–82	José Juan Barea (21)	Nikola Peković (11)	Ricky Rubio (9)	The Palace of Auburn Hills; 16,877	25–44
70	March 27	L. A. Lakers	L 117–120	Nikola Peković (19)	Nikola Peković (16)	Ricky Rubio (7)	Target Center; 18,029	25–45
71	March 29	Oklahoma City	W 101–93	Nikola Peković (22)	Nikola Peković (15)	Ricky Rubio (7)	Target Center; 18,121	26–45
72	March 30	Memphis	L 86–99	Ricky Rubio (23)	Ricky Rubio (10)	Ricky Rubio (9)	Target Center; 13,680	26–46

April : 5–5 (home: 3–2; road: 2–3)

Game	Date	Team	Score	High points	High rebounds	High assists	Location Attendance	Record
73	April 1	Boston	W 110–100	Nikola Peković (29)	Andrei Kirilenko (9)	Ricky Rubio (10)	Target Center; 14,546	27–46
74	April 3	@ Milwaukee	W 107–98	Nikola Peković (27)	Nikola Peković (8)	Ricky Rubio (12)	BMO Harris Bradley Center; 15,386	28–46
75	April 5	Toronto	L 93–95	Nikola Peković (24)	Nikola Peković (8)	Ricky Rubio (12)	Target Center; 16,661	28–47
76	April 6	Detroit	W 107–101	Nikola Peković (20)	Nikola Peković (13)	Ricky Rubio (6)	Target Center; 15,311	29–47
77	April 9	@ Golden State	L 89–105	Chase Budinger (17)	Greg Stiemsma (9)	Alexey Shved (9)	Oracle Arena; 19,596	29–48
78	April 10	@ L. A. Clippers	L 95–111	Nikola Peković (20)	Derrick Williams (10)	Ricky Rubio (7)	Staples Center; 19,060	29–49
79	April 12	@ Utah	L 100–107	José Juan Barea (23)	Greg Stiemsma (7)	Alexey Shved (5)	EnergySolutions Arena; 19,609	29–50
80	April 13	Phoenix	W 105–93	Ricky Rubio (24)	Dante Cunningham (8)	Ricky Rubio (10)	Target Center; 16,701	30–50
81	April 15	Utah	L 80–96	Derrick Williams (18)	Greg Stiemsma (8)	José Juan Barea (5)	Target Center; 17,009	30–51
82	April 17	@ San Antonio	W 108–95	Derrick Williams (21)	Greg Stiemsma (9)	Luke Ridnour (6)	AT&T Center; 18,581	31–51

2012–13 season schedule

=== Standings ===
Northwest Division	W	L	PCT	GB	Home	Road	Div	GP
c-Oklahoma City Thunder	60	22	.732	–	34–7	26–15	10–6	82
x-Denver Nuggets	57	25	.695	3	38–3	19–22	11–5	82
Utah Jazz	43	39	.524	17	30–11	13–28	9–7	82
Portland Trail Blazers	33	49	.402	27	22–19	11–30	6–10	82
Minnesota Timberwolves	31	51	.378	29	20–21	11–30	4–12	82

Western Conference
#	Team	W	L	PCT	GB	GP
1	c-Oklahoma City Thunder *	60	22	.732	–	82
2	y-San Antonio Spurs *	58	24	.707	2.0	82
3	x-Denver Nuggets *	57	25	.695	3.0	82
4	y-Los Angeles Clippers	56	26	.683	4.0	82
5	x-Memphis Grizzlies	56	26	.683	4.0	82
6	x-Golden State Warriors	47	35	.573	13.0	82
7	x-Los Angeles Lakers	45	37	.549	15.0	82
8	x-Houston Rockets	45	37	.549	15.0	82
9	Utah Jazz	43	39	.524	17.0	82
10	Dallas Mavericks	41	41	.500	19.0	82
11	Portland Trail Blazers	33	49	.402	27.0	82
12	Minnesota Timberwolves	31	51	.378	29.0	82
13	Sacramento Kings	28	54	.341	32.0	82
14	New Orleans Hornets	27	55	.329	33.0	82
15	Phoenix Suns	25	57	.305	35.0	82

== Injuries ==
Kevin Love suffered a fracture in his right hand during a team workout midway through the pre-season. He was expected to be sidelined between six and eight weeks.

== Player statistics ==
=== Regular season ===
Player	POS	GP	GS	MP	REB	AST	STL	BLK	PTS	MPG	RPG	APG	SPG	BPG	PPG
Luke Ridnour	SG	82	82	2,474	206	311	82	15	939	30.2	2.5	3.8	1.0	.2	11.5
Dante Cunningham	PF	80	9	2,010	408	67	84	38	695	25.1	5.1	.8	1.1	.5	8.7
Derrick Williams	PF	78	56	1,916	430	46	44	37	933	24.6	5.5	.6	.6	.5	12.0
Alexey Shved	SG	77	16	1,840	175	286	54	27	665	23.9	2.3	3.7	.7	.4	8.6
Greg Stiemsma	C	76	19	1,209	261	30	44	90	307	15.9	3.4	.4	.6	1.2	4.0
J. J. Barea	PG	74	2	1,713	207	294	32	0	834	23.1	2.8	4.0	.4	.0	11.3
Andrei Kirilenko	SF	64	64	2,034	362	177	96	62	791	31.8	5.7	2.8	1.5	1.0	12.4
Nikola Peković	C	62	62	1,959	545	53	43	50	1,011	31.6	8.8	.9	.7	.8	16.3
Ricky Rubio	PG	57	47	1,691	229	418	137	5	608	29.7	4.0	7.3	2.4	.1	10.7
Mickaël Gelabale	SF	36	13	644	99	26	16	4	181	17.9	2.8	.7	.4	.1	5.0
Chris Johnson	C	30	0	284	60	8	7	28	117	9.5	2.0	.3	.2	.9	3.9
Chase Budinger	SF	23	1	508	71	25	14	7	216	22.1	3.1	1.1	.6	.3	9.4
Lou Amundson^{†}	PF	20	0	161	47	3	7	6	32	8.1	2.4	.2	.4	.3	1.6
Kevin Love	PF	18	18	618	252	42	13	9	330	34.3	14.0	2.3	.7	.5	18.3
Malcolm Lee	SG	16	12	289	39	20	12	6	78	18.1	2.4	1.3	.8	.4	4.9
Josh Howard	SF	11	4	207	36	4	10	3	74	18.8	3.3	.4	.9	.3	6.7
Brandon Roy	SG	5	5	122	14	23	3	0	29	24.4	2.8	4.6	.6	.0	5.8
Lazar Hayward	SF	4	0	31	4	3	2	0	10	7.8	1.0	.8	.5	.0	2.5
Will Conroy	PG	4	0	20	1	0	0	0	1	5.0	.3	.0	.0	.0	.3

- ^{†} Denotes player spent time with another team in the season. Stats reflect time with the Timberwolves only.

== Transactions ==
=== Overview ===
Players Added

Via trade

- Chase Budinger
- Dante Cunningham

Via free agency

- Louis Amundson
- Will Conroy
- Andrei Kirilenko
- Brandon Roy
- Alexey Shved
- Greg Stiemsma
Players Lost

Via trade

- Wayne Ellington
- Wesley Johnson
- Brad Miller

Via free agency

- Michael Beasley
- Anthony Randolph
- Anthony Tolliver

Waived

- Darko Miličić
- Martell Webster

=== Trades ===
June 26, 2012	To Minnesota Timberwolves Chase Budinger; Draft rights to Lior Eliyahu	To Houston Rockets The 18th overall pick in 2012
July 13, 2012	To Minnesota Timberwolves 2016 second-round pick	To New Orleans Hornets Brad Miller; 2013 second-round pick 2016 second-round pick Cash considerations
July 24, 2012	To Minnesota Timberwolves Dante Cunningham	To Memphis Grizzlies Wayne Ellington
July 27, 2012 (3-team trade)	To Minnesota Timberwolves 2013 second-round pick (from New Orleans); 2014 second-round pick (from Phoenix); 2017 second-round pick (from New Orleans)	To Phoenix Suns Wesley Johnson; Future first-round pick

=== Free agents ===
Additions
Player	Date signed	Former team
Alexey Shved	July 25	CSKA Moscow (Russia)
Andrei Kirilenko	July 27	CSKA Moscow (Russia)
Brandon Roy	July 31	Portland Trail Blazers
Greg Stiemsma	August 2	Boston Celtics
Louis Amundson	September 24	Indiana Pacers
Will Conroy	September 28	Rio Grande Valley Vipers (D-League)

Subtractions
Player	Date left	New team
Michael Beasley	July 20	Phoenix Suns
Anthony Randolph	July 20	Denver Nuggets
Martell Webster	August 29	Washington Wizards
Anthony Tolliver	September 27	Atlanta Hawks
