= Derrick Williams (basketball) =

American basketball player (born 1991)

- Williams with AEK Athens in 2026

No. 20 – AEK Athens
- Position: Power forward
- League: Greek Basketball League; Basketball Champions League

Personal information
- Born: May 25, 1991 (age 35) Bellflower, California, U.S.
- Listed height: 6 ft 8 in (2.03 m)
- Listed weight: 240 lb (109 kg)

Career information
- High school: La Mirada (La Mirada, California)
- College: Arizona (2009–2011)
- NBA draft: 2011: 1st round, 2nd overall pick
- Drafted by: Minnesota Timberwolves
- Playing career: 2011–present

Career history
- 2011–2013: Minnesota Timberwolves
- 2013–2015: Sacramento Kings
- 2015–2016: New York Knicks
- 2016–2017: Miami Heat
- 2017: Cleveland Cavaliers
- 2017–2018: Tianjin Gold Lions
- 2018: Los Angeles Lakers
- 2018–2019: Bayern Munich
- 2019–2020: Fenerbahçe
- 2020–2021: Valencia
- 2021–2022: Maccabi Tel Aviv
- 2022–2023: Panathinaikos
- 2025: Mets de Guaynabo
- 2025–2026: Suwon KT Sonicboom
- 2026–present: AEK Athens

Career highlights
- NBA All-Rookie Second Team (2012); Greek League All-Star (2022); Turkish Cup winner (2020); Turkish All-Star (2020); German BBL champion (2019); Consensus second-team All-American (2011); Pac-10 Player of the Year (2011); 2× First-team All-Pac-10 (2010, 2011); Pac-10 Freshman of the Year (2010)
- Stats at NBA.com
- Stats at Basketball Reference

Derrick LeRon Williams (born May 25, 1991) is an American professional basketball player for AEK Athens of the Greek Basketball League and the Basketball Champions League (BCL). He played college basketball for the Arizona Wildcats from 2009 to 2011. Williams was selected with the second overall pick by the Minnesota Timberwolves in the 2011 NBA draft.

Williams spent two and a half seasons with the Timberwolves before being traded to the Sacramento Kings in 2013. After two seasons with the Kings, Williams signed with the New York Knicks in 2015. He signed with the Miami Heat in 2016 and was waived in 2017. Williams then joined the Cleveland Cavaliers with whom he reached the 2017 NBA Finals. He signed in China to start the 2017–18 season, but joined the Los Angeles Lakers on a 10-day contract in 2018. Williams has played overseas since the 2018–19 season with stints in Germany, Turkey, Spain, Israel, Greece, Puerto Rico and South Korea.

== Early life ==
Williams was born in Bellflower, California, and graduated from La Mirada High School.

== College career ==
Williams originally committed to play at the University of Southern California. He was quickly recruited by first-year head coach Sean Miller at the University of Arizona.

=== Freshman year ===
As a freshman in 2009–10, Williams averaged 15.7 points (7th in the Pac-10) and 7.1 rebounds per game, and had a field goal percentage of .575 (2nd in the Pac-10; 12th in the NCAA). He was named a freshman All-American, All-Pac-10 first team and the Pac-10 Freshman of the Year.

=== Sophomore year ===
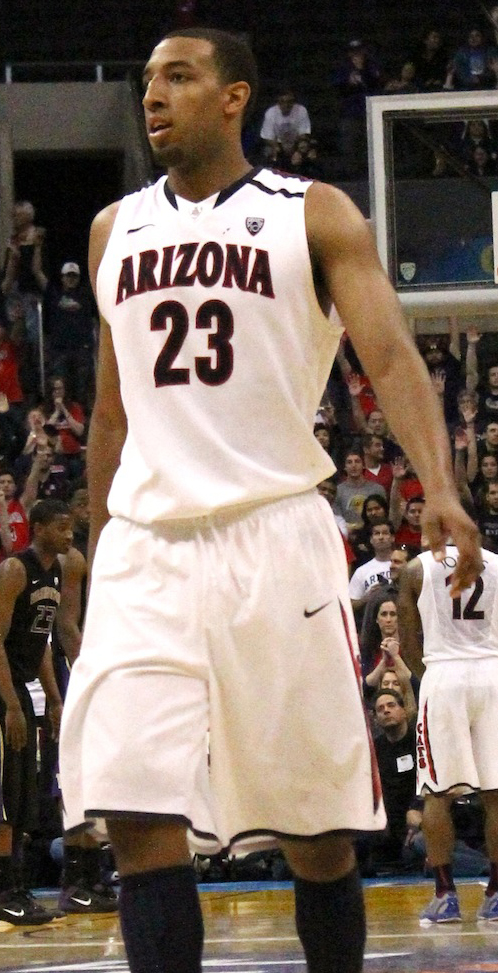
Williams with Arizona in 2011

Williams rose to national prominence in his sophomore year. He averaged 19.5 points (2nd in the Pac-10) and 8.3 rebounds (4th) per game. During the 2011 season, Williams had a field goal percentage of .595 (tops in the Pac-10; 9th in the NCAA). He led the NCAA in True Shooting percentage (.690) and Effective Field Goal percentage (.650), helping lead the Arizona Wildcats basketball team to a regular season PAC-10 championship. Williams was named the Pac-10 Player of the Year.

Williams also contributed to the Wildcats' run in the 2011 NCAA Men's Division I Basketball Tournament. He made a critical block with less than 2 seconds against Memphis. He had a 3-point play against the Texas Longhorns, which advanced the Wildcats to the Sweet 16 of the tournament. Williams then had a career-high 32 points along with 13 rebounds to lead Arizona in an upset victory over the #1-seeded Duke by a 16-point margin to advance into the Elite Eight, where they fell 65–63 to the future NCAA tournament champion, Connecticut. At the end of the season he was projected to be one of the top picks for the upcoming NBA draft.

Sophomore year honors:

- Pac-10 Player of the Year
- All-Pac-10 first team
- Three time Pac-10 Player of the Week
- USBWA District IX Player of the Year
- Wooden Award's 10-player All-America team in 2011
- First-team All-American by Sports Illustrated
- Second-team by the Associated Press in 2011.
- Second-team by Sporting News
- Second-team by the United States Basketball Writers Association
- Second-team by the National Association of Basketball Coaches
- Second-team by Fox Sports.

== Professional career ==
=== Minnesota Timberwolves (2011–2013) ===
Williams announced that he would declare for the NBA draft on April 13, 2011. He was selected with the second overall pick by the Timberwolves in the 2011 NBA draft. During the NBA lockout of 2011, he spent the summer at the University of Arizona taking summer classes to finish his degree. Shortly after the draft, Under Armour signed an endorsement deal with Williams. Williams joined several other NBA players for an exhibition game in the Philippines during the summer of 2011.

Williams participated in the 2012 Rising Stars Challenge, as well as the 2012 NBA All-Star Weekend Slam Dunk Contest. Williams scored a season-high 27 points on February 28, 2012, in a win over the Los Angeles Clippers. He made 9 of 10 shots from the field and 4 of 4 from three-point range. He led the Timberwolves to victory over the New Orleans Hornets with what was then a career-high 28 points on March 17, 2013.

=== Sacramento Kings (2013–2015) ===
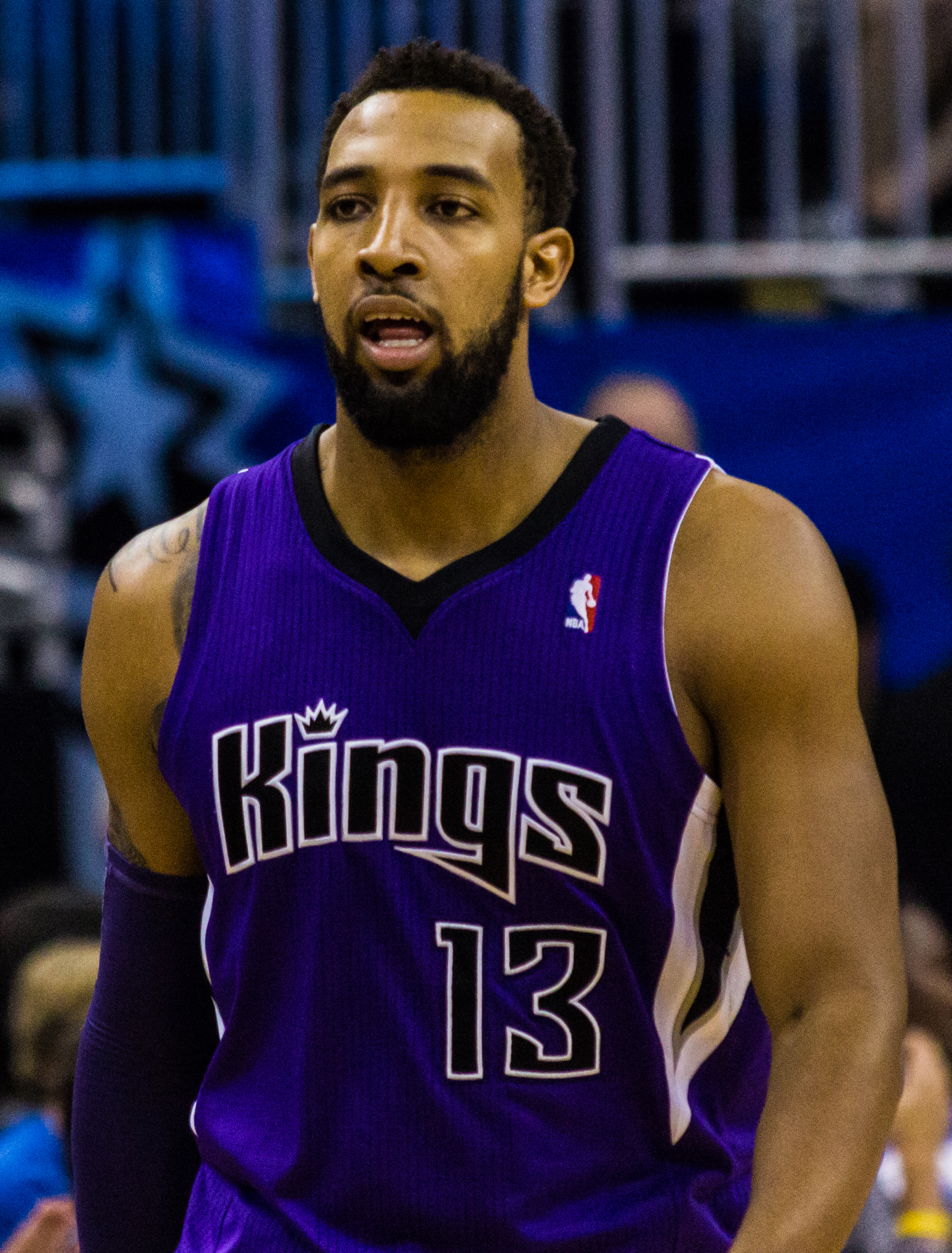
Williams with the Kings in 2013

On November 26, 2013, Williams was traded to the Sacramento Kings for forward Luc Mbah a Moute. He made his debut on November 29, 2013, finishing with 12 points (on 6-for-13 shooting), six rebounds and four assists in a 104–96 overtime loss to the Los Angeles Clippers. On December 9, 2013, Williams scored a career-high 31 points in a victory over the Dallas Mavericks.

In the Kings' 2014–15 season finale on April 15, Williams scored a season-high 22 points in a 122–109 win over the Los Angeles Lakers.

=== New York Knicks (2015–2016) ===
On July 9, 2015, Williams signed with the New York Knicks. He made his debut for the Knicks in the team's season opener against the Milwaukee Bucks on October 28, scoring a game-high 24 points in a 122–97 win. On January 12, 2016, he recorded his first double-double of the season with 15 points and 10 rebounds in a 120–114 win over the Boston Celtics. The next day, he tied his career-high of 31 points in a loss to the Brooklyn Nets.

=== Miami Heat (2016–2017) ===
On July 10, 2016, Williams signed with the Miami Heat. On February 6, 2017, he was waived by the Heat after appearing in 25 games.

=== Cleveland Cavaliers (2017) ===
Williams (front right) with his Cleveland Cavaliers teammates in 2017

On February 9, 2017, Williams signed a 10-day contract with the Cleveland Cavaliers. That night, Williams played 22 minutes in his debut in Cleveland's 118–109 loss to the Oklahoma City Thunder and scored 12 points, going 3-for-3 from the field and 6-for-8 from the free throw line. He went on to sign a second 10-day contract on February 22, and then a rest-of-season contract on March 4. The Cavaliers reached the 2017 NBA Finals, where they were beaten in five games by the Golden State Warriors.

=== Tianjin Gold Lions (2017–2018) ===
On December 28, 2017, Williams signed with the Tianjin Gold Lions of the Chinese Basketball Association. In 15 games for Tianjin between early January and early February, Williams averaged 20.0 points, 6.6 rebounds, 1.4 assists and 1.7 steals per game.

=== Los Angeles Lakers (2018) ===
On March 9, 2018, Williams signed a 10-day contract with the Los Angeles Lakers. After the contract expired, the Lakers decided to part ways with him.

=== Bayern Munich (2018–2019) ===
On October 3, 2018, Williams signed with Bayern Munich of the Basketball Bundesliga (BBL) and the EuroLeague for the 2018–19 season. In the EuroLeague, Williams averaged 13.4 points (9th in the EuroLeague) and 4.2 rebounds over 29 games, and was 9th in the EuroLeague with a .794 free throw percentage. In the BBL, Williams won the championship with Bayern after defeating Alba Berlin in the BBL Finals.

=== Fenerbahçe (2019–2020) ===
Williams with Fenerbahçe in 2019

On July 18, 2019, Fenerbahçe announced that Williams had signed a one-year contract with the Turkish club.

=== Valencia (2020–2021) ===
On July 8, 2020, Williams signed with Valencia Basket of the Spanish Liga ACB.

=== Maccabi Tel Aviv (2021–2022) ===
On June 30, 2021, Williams signed a one-year contract with Maccabi Tel Aviv of the Israeli Basketball Premier League and the EuroLeague. He averaged 9.6 points, 3.2 rebounds and 1.2 assists per game. On June 28, 2022, Williams officially parted ways with the Israeli club.

=== Panathinaikos (2022–2023) ===
On July 15, 2022, Williams signed a one-year contract with Panathinaikos of the Greek Basket League and the EuroLeague. In 34 EuroLeague games, he averaged 12.4 points, 3.9 rebounds and 1.2 assists, playing around 29 minutes per contest. Additionally, in 32 domestic league matches, he averaged 6.2 points and 2.1 rebounds, playing around 18 minutes per contest. On July 3, 2023, he was officially released from the team.

=== Mets de Guaynabo (2025) ===
Williams signed with the Guaynabo Mets to play under former teammate Jose Juan Barea. Through the early season (as of March 23, 2025), he averaged 14.0 points, 4.0 rebounds, 1.7 assists, and 0.3 steals per game over three games. Williams faced a setback with a $2,500 fine and a two-game suspension for disciplinary reasons following an incident on April 19, 2025, during a game against the Cangrejeros de Santurce

=== AEK Athens (2026–present) ===
On August 17, 2026, Williams signed with AEK Athens of the Greek Basketball League on a 1+1 contract.

== Career statistics ==
Legend
GP	Games played	GS	Games started	MPG	Minutes per game
FG%	Field-goal percentage	3P%	3-point field-goal percentage	FT%	Free-throw percentage
RPG	Rebounds per game	APG	Assists per game	SPG	Steals per game
BPG	Blocks per game	PPG	Points per game	PIR	Performance index rating
**Bold**	Career high

=== NBA ===
*	Led the league

==== Regular season ====
Year	Team	GP	GS	MPG	FG%	3P%	FT%	RPG	APG	SPG	BPG	PPG
2011–12	Minnesota	66*	15	21.5	.412	.268	.697	4.7	.6	.5	**.5**	8.8
2012–13	Minnesota	78	**56**	24.6	.430	.332	.706	**5.5**	.6	.6	**.5**	**12.0**
2013–14	Minnesota	11	0	14.7	.352	.133	**.875**	2.4	.1	.4	.4	4.9
2013–14	Sacramento	67	15	**24.7**	.437	.286	.708	4.4	.8	**.7**	.2	8.5
2014–15	Sacramento	74	6	19.8	.447	.314	.684	2.7	.7	.5	.1	8.3
2015–16	New York	**80**	9	17.9	.450	.293	.758	3.7	**.9**	.4	.1	9.3
2016–17	Miami	25	11	15.1	.394	.200	.620	2.9	.6	.4	.2	5.9
2016–17	Cleveland	25	0	17.1	**.505**	**.404**	.692	2.3	.6	.2	.1	6.2
2017–18	L.A. Lakers	2	0	4.5	.250	.000	.000	.5	.0	.0	.0	1.0
Career		428	112	20.7	.434	.300	.710	4.0	.7	.5	.3	8.9

==== Playoffs ====
Year	Team	GP	GS	MPG	FG%	3P%	FT%	RPG	APG	SPG	BPG	PPG
2016–17	Cleveland	8	0	4.8	.533	.600	1.000	.4	.5	.0	.1	2.6
Career		8	0	4.8	.533	.600	1.000	.4	.5	.0	.1	2.6

=== Euroleague ===
*	Led the league

Year	Team	GP	GS	MPG	FG%	3P%	FT%	RPG	APG	SPG	BPG	PPG	PIR
2018–19	Bayern Munich	29	2	26.0	.460	.333	**.784**	**4.2**	.6	.6	**.5**	**13.4**	**14.2**
2019–20	Fenerbahçe	28*	20	26.1	.487	.373	.667	3.9	**1.2**	**1.1**	.3	11.3	12.5
2020–21	Valencia	34	19	20.2	**.544**	.324	.735	3.1	1.1	.7	.1	9.0	9.7
2021–22	Maccabi	**35**	31	24.6	.436	.378	.711	3.1	.9	.9	.1	9.4	9.1
2022–23	Panathinaikos	34	**32**	**29.3**	.477	**.380**	.719	3.9	**1.2**	.8	.1	12.4	12.1
Career		160	104	25.2	.478	.362	.730	3.6	1.0	.8	.2	11.0	11.4

=== College ===
College	Year	GP	GS	MIN	SPG	BPG	RPG	APG	PPG	FG%	FT%	3P%
Arizona Wildcats	2009–10	31	31	28.2	0.6	0.6	7.1	0.7	15.7	.574	.681	.250
Arizona Wildcats	2010–11	38	38	30.0	1.0	0.7	8.3	1.1	19.5	.595	.746	.568
Career		69	69	29.2	0.8	0.7	7.8	0.9	17.8	.586	.717	.425
