= Gerindote =

Coordinates: 39°58′N 4°18′W

- municipality
- Flag Coat of arms
- Interactive map of Gerindote
- Country: Spain
- Autonomous community: Castile-La Mancha
- Province: Toledo
- Municipality: Gerindote

Government
  - Mayor: Julián Gutiérrez Morales

Area
  - Total: 44 km^{2} (17 sq mi)
- Elevation: 523 m (1,716 ft)

Population (2025-01-01)
  - Total: 2,828
  - Density: 64/km^{2} (170/sq mi)
- Time zone: UTC+1 (CET)
  - Summer (DST): UTC+2 (CEST)

Gerindote is a municipality located in the province of Toledo, Castile-La Mancha, Spain. According to the 2006 census (INE), the municipality has a population of 2179 inhabitants.

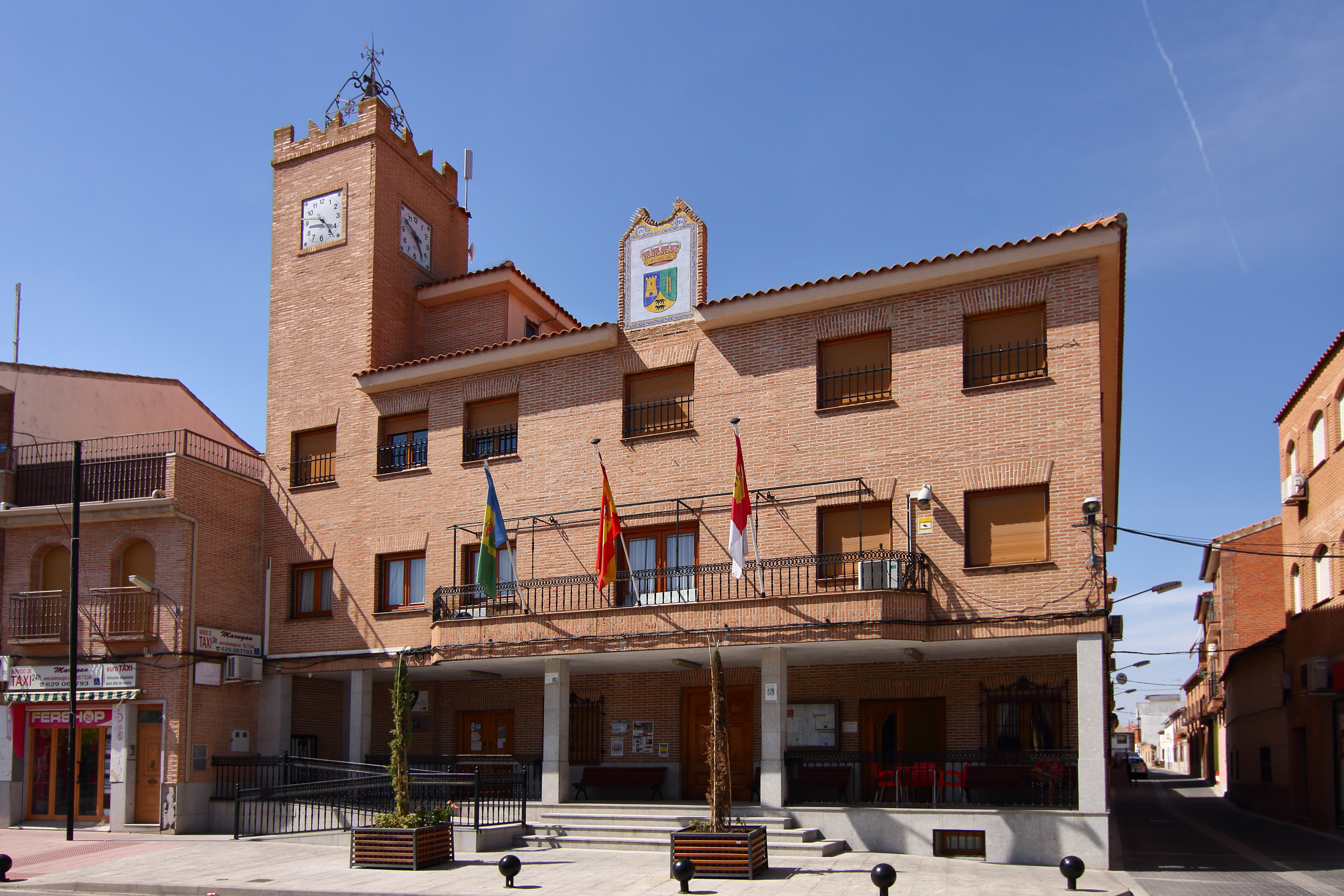
Gerindote Local Council
