= NBA 3X =

The NBA 3X is an exhibition tournament organized by BBVA in Spain that offers the youngest basketball players the opportunity to directly experience the NBA in a family environment and challenge themselves together with their friends in a competition to become champions of the tournament. It is open to all boys and girls in teams of three or four players within the following age groups: U-12, U-14, U-16, U-18 and 18+.

Since the first edition of NBA 3X presented by BBVA in 2012, more than 3,000 teams and 11,000 players from all over Spain have participated in this event. It can be related as a sequel to NBA 5 United, also inviting NBA players and local streetball athletes, including NBA legends Bruce Bowen, Ron Harper and Robert Horry, who together have 15 NBA rings, rising star of the Philadelphia 76ers and 2013 All Star Jrue Holiday and 2012 All Rookie First Team member Kenneth Faried of the Denver Nuggets.

== Events by year ==
=== 2013 ===
The 2013 NBA 3X Tour featured sponsored activities such as the BBVA Knockout, the adidas Skills Challenge, the Eagle Slam Cam, the Spalding pop-a-shot, the Sprite Slam Dunk Contest and the Oscar Mayer Dunk Tank. Live performances by DJs, autograph sessions, appearances by players and former NBA players and performances by dance or dunk teams, NBA merchandising giveaways and many other activities.

=== 2015 ===
In addition to the 3-on-3 tournament, there will be activities such as the BBVA Chill Zone, with the Instaprint activation to directly print photos of fans on Instagram with the hashtag of the event; BBVA Hologram, where fans can virtually connect with Kevin Durant, six-time NBA All-Star winner, 2013–14 season MVP and BBVA ambassador; Skills Challenge, where fans' dribbling skills will be put to the test in an obstacle course, among others.

=== 2018 ===
The competitive 3 for 3 tournament would start with the following itinerary: May 11 and 12 in Malaga with Ron Harper, May 18 and 19 in Valencia with Jrue Holiday, June 8 and 9 in Madrid with Robert Horry, July 13 and 14 in Vigo with Kenneth Faried, July 20 and 21 in Barcelona with Kenneth Faried, September 14 and 15 in Barcelona with Bruce Bowen and September 21 and 22 in Toledo with Bruce Bowen, culminating in the national final of the 3X, from September 4 to October 6, in Bilbao.

== Special guests ==
=== NBA players ===
- A.C. Green
- Bruce Bowen (2012)
- Dominique Wilkins (2013)
- Rudy Gay (2015)
