= 2012–13 NBA season =

67th NBA season

- League: National Basketball Association
- Sport: Basketball
- Duration: October 30, 2012 – April 17, 2013; April 20 – June 3, 2013 (Playoffs); June 6 – 20, 2013 (Finals)
- Games: 82 (Note: The Boston Celtics and the Indiana Pacers played only 81 games each as their matchup originally scheduled for April 16, 2013 was canceled as a result of the Boston Marathon bombing.)
- Teams: 30
- TV partner(s): ABC, TNT, ESPN, NBA TV

Draft
- Top draft pick: Anthony Davis
- Picked by: New Orleans Hornets

Regular season
- Top seed: Miami Heat
- Season MVP: LeBron James (Miami)
- Top scorer: Carmelo Anthony (New York)

Playoffs
- Eastern champions: Miami Heat
- Eastern runners-up: Indiana Pacers
- Western champions: San Antonio Spurs
- Western runners-up: Memphis Grizzlies

Finals
- Champions: Miami Heat
- Runners-up: San Antonio Spurs
- Finals MVP: LeBron James (Miami)

NBA seasons
- ← 2011–12 2013–14 →

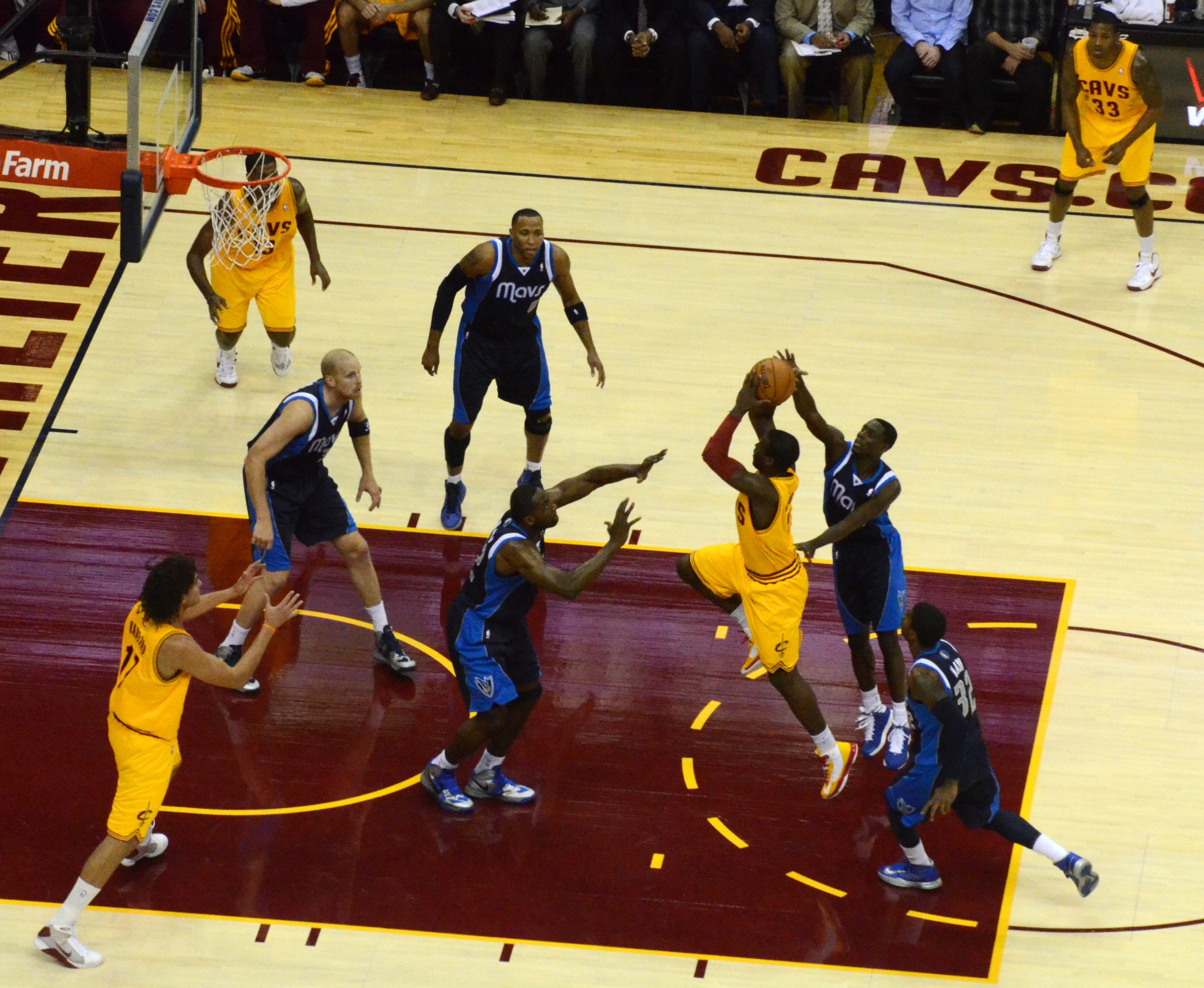
Dion Waiters driving, Dallas Mavericks versus Cleveland Cavaliers on November 17, 2012

The 2012–13 NBA season was the 67th season of the National Basketball Association (NBA). The regular season began on October 30, 2012, when the 2011–12 NBA champions Miami Heat started the season by hosting the Boston Celtics. The 2013 NBA All-Star Game was played on February 17, 2013, at Toyota Center in Houston, Texas. The regular season ended on April 17, 2013, and the playoffs began on April 20, 2013, and ended on June 20, 2013, with the Miami Heat defeating the San Antonio Spurs in seven games to win the 2013 NBA Finals.

== Transactions ==
=== Free agency ===
Free agency negotiation started on July 1, 2012, with players being able to sign starting July 11, after the July moratorium ended.

=== Coaching changes ===
Coaching changes
Off-season
Team	2011–12 coach	2012–13 coach
Charlotte Bobcats	Paul Silas	Mike Dunlap
Orlando Magic	Stan Van Gundy	Jacque Vaughn
Portland Trail Blazers	Kaleb Canales (interim)	Terry Stotts
In-season
Team	Outgoing coach	Incoming coach
Los Angeles Lakers	Mike Brown	Bernie Bickerstaff (interim)
Los Angeles Lakers	Bernie Bickerstaff (interim)	Mike D'Antoni
Brooklyn Nets	Avery Johnson	P. J. Carlesimo (interim)
Milwaukee Bucks	Scott Skiles	Jim Boylan (interim)
Phoenix Suns	Alvin Gentry	Lindsey Hunter (interim)

==== Off-season ====
- On April 30, 2012, the Charlotte Bobcats released Paul Silas from his coaching contract. On June 20, the Charlotte Bobcats hired Mike Dunlap as head coach.
- On May 21, 2012, the Orlando Magic fired head coach Stan Van Gundy. On July 28, the Orlando Magic hired Jacque Vaughn as head coach.
- On August 8, 2012, the Portland Trail Blazers hired Terry Stotts as head coach, and demoted Kaleb Canales back to assistant head coach.

==== In-season ====
- On November 9, 2012, the Los Angeles Lakers fired Mike Brown after starting the season 1–4 and named Bernie Bickerstaff as interim head coach. This was one of the earliest regular season head coach firings in NBA history. On November 12, 2012, the Lakers hired Mike D'Antoni as official head coach and demoted Bickerstaff back to an assistant head coach.
- On December 27, 2012, the Brooklyn Nets fired Avery Johnson after losing 10 out of 13 games in December, which came right after winning the Eastern Conference's Coach of the Month award in November. The team promoted assistant P. J. Carlesimo as interim head coach.
- On January 8, 2013, the Milwaukee Bucks and Scott Skiles mutually agreed to part ways after starting the season with a 16–16 record. The team promoted assistant Jim Boylan as interim head coach.
- On January 18, 2013, the Phoenix Suns and Alvin Gentry mutually agreed to part ways. The Suns' 13–28 record at the time of Gentry's departure was the worst in the Western Conference. The team promoted assistant and development coach Lindsey Hunter as interim head coach.

== Preseason ==
The preseason started on October 5, 2012, and ended on October 26, 2012.

NBA Europe Live 2012 was played October 5 – 7 and 9, 2012 featuring the Boston Celtics, Dallas Mavericks, and teams from Europe (Fenerbahçe Ülker, Alba Berlin, Olimpia Milano and Regal FC Barcelona). The Miami Heat defeated the Los Angeles Clippers at the sixth annual NBA China Games on October 11 in Beijing. A second game took place on October 14 in Shanghai. On October 7, the NBA Mexico Games 2012 were played between the New Orleans Hornets and Orlando Magic. Finally, the NBA Canada Series was played on October 19 between the Toronto Raptors and New York Knicks in Montreal, and on October 24 between the Minnesota Timberwolves and Detroit Pistons in Winnipeg.

== Regular season ==
The regular season started on October 30, 2012, when the 2011–12 NBA champions Miami Heat defeated the Boston Celtics 120–107. The regular season ended on April 17, 2013. The entire schedule was released on July 26, 2012.

For the first time since 2008, the NBA did not schedule any Thanksgiving games. The NBA's annual Christmas games featured, in chronological order, the Boston Celtics at the Brooklyn Nets, the New York Knicks at the Los Angeles Lakers, the Oklahoma City Thunder at the Miami Heat, the Houston Rockets at the Chicago Bulls, and the Denver Nuggets at the Los Angeles Clippers (thus the Staples Center was in the rare situation of hosting two NBA games on the same day).

A regular season game took place at the O2 Arena in London, United Kingdom between the Detroit Pistons and the New York Knicks on January 17, 2013. The Knicks won the game 102–87.

The Boston Celtics and Indiana Pacers played 81 games instead of the scheduled 82. A Pacers-Celtics game in Boston was initially postponed in the aftermath of the 2013 Boston Marathon bombing. Because this happened very late in the regular season (leaving little time in which either team could play on a new date in Boston) and the results would not have affected that season's standings, the NBA decided to vacate the game for good.

=== Standings ===
==== By division ====
Eastern Conference

Atlantic Division	W	L	PCT	GB	Home	Road	Div	GP
y-New York Knicks	54	28	.659	–	31–10	23–18	10–6	82
x-Brooklyn Nets	49	33	.598	5	26–15	23–18	11–5	82
x-Boston Celtics	41	40	.506	12.5	27–13	14–27	7–9	81†
Philadelphia 76ers	34	48	.415	20	23–18	11–30	7–9	82
Toronto Raptors	34	48	.415	20	21–20	13–28	5–11	82

Central Division	W	L	PCT	GB	Home	Road	Div	GP
y-Indiana Pacers	49	32	.605	–	30–11	19–21	13–3	81†
x-Chicago Bulls	45	37	.549	4.5	24–17	21–20	9–7	82
x-Milwaukee Bucks	38	44	.463	11.5	21–20	17–24	7–9	82
Detroit Pistons	29	53	.354	20.5	18–23	11–30	8–8	82
Cleveland Cavaliers	24	58	.293	25.5	14–27	10–31	3–13	82

Southeast Division	W	L	PCT	GB	Home	Road	Div	GP
z-Miami Heat	66	16	.805	–	37–4	29–12	15–1	82
x-Atlanta Hawks	44	38	.537	22	25–16	19–22	11–5	82
Washington Wizards	29	53	.354	37	22–19	7–34	5–11	82
Charlotte Bobcats	21	61	.256	45	15–26	6–35	6–10	82
Orlando Magic	20	62	.244	46	12–29	8–33	3–13	82

Western Conference

Northwest Division	W	L	PCT	GB	Home	Road	Div	GP
c-Oklahoma City Thunder	60	22	.732	–	34–7	26–15	10–6	82
x-Denver Nuggets	57	25	.695	3	38–3	19–22	11–5	82
Utah Jazz	43	39	.524	17	30–11	13–28	9–7	82
Portland Trail Blazers	33	49	.402	27	22–19	11–30	6–10	82
Minnesota Timberwolves	31	51	.378	29	20–21	11–30	4–12	82

Pacific Division	W	L	PCT	GB	Home	Road	Div	GP
y-Los Angeles Clippers	56	26	.683	–	32–9	24–17	11–5	82
x-Golden State Warriors	47	35	.573	9	28–13	19–22	9–7	82
x-Los Angeles Lakers	45	37	.549	11	29–12	16–25	8–8	82
Sacramento Kings	28	54	.341	28	20–21	8–33	7–9	82
Phoenix Suns	25	57	.305	31	17–24	8–33	5–11	82

Southwest Division	W	L	PCT	GB	Home	Road	Div	GP
y-San Antonio Spurs	58	24	.707	–	35–6	23–18	12–4	82
x-Memphis Grizzlies	56	26	.683	2	32–9	24–17	10–6	82
x-Houston Rockets	45	37	.549	13	29–12	16–25	6–10	82
Dallas Mavericks	41	41	.500	17	24–17	17–24	7–9	82
New Orleans Hornets	27	55	.329	31	16–25	11–30	5–11	82

==== By conference ====
Eastern Conference
#	Team	W	L	PCT	GB	GP
1	z-Miami Heat *	66	16	.805	–	82
2	y-New York Knicks *	54	28	.659	12.0	82
3	y-Indiana Pacers *	49	32	.605	16.5	81
4	x-Brooklyn Nets	49	33	.598	17.0	82
5	x-Chicago Bulls	45	37	.549	21.0	82
6	x-Atlanta Hawks	44	38	.537	22.0	82
7	x-Boston Celtics	41	40	.506	24.5	81
8	x-Milwaukee Bucks	38	44	.463	28.0	82
9	Philadelphia 76ers	34	48	.415	32.0	82
10	Toronto Raptors	34	48	.415	32.0	82
11	Washington Wizards	29	53	.354	37.0	82
12	Detroit Pistons	29	53	.354	37.0	82
13	Cleveland Cavaliers	24	58	.293	42.0	82
14	Charlotte Bobcats	21	61	.256	45.0	82
15	Orlando Magic	20	62	.244	46.0	82

Western Conference
#	Team	W	L	PCT	GB	GP
1	c-Oklahoma City Thunder *	60	22	.732	–	82
2	y-San Antonio Spurs *	58	24	.707	2.0	82
3	x-Denver Nuggets *	57	25	.695	3.0	82
4	y-Los Angeles Clippers	56	26	.683	4.0	82
5	x-Memphis Grizzlies	56	26	.683	4.0	82
6	x-Golden State Warriors	47	35	.573	13.0	82
7	x-Los Angeles Lakers	45	37	.549	15.0	82
8	x-Houston Rockets	45	37	.549	15.0	82
9	Utah Jazz	43	39	.524	17.0	82
10	Dallas Mavericks	41	41	.500	19.0	82
11	Portland Trail Blazers	33	49	.402	27.0	82
12	Minnesota Timberwolves	31	51	.378	29.0	82
13	Sacramento Kings	28	54	.341	32.0	82
14	New Orleans Hornets	27	55	.329	33.0	82
15	Phoenix Suns	25	57	.305	35.0	82

Notes

- z – Clinched home court advantage for the entire playoffs
- c – Clinched home court advantage for the conference playoffs
- y – Clinched division title
- x – Clinched playoff spot
- † – In the aftermath of the Boston Marathon bombing, the NBA canceled the April 16 game scheduled in Boston between the Celtics and the Pacers; the game was not rescheduled because it would have had no impact on either team's playoff seedings.

==== Tiebreakers ====
===== Western Conference =====
- The Los Angeles Clippers clinched #4 seed over Memphis as the Clippers won the Pacific Division and the Grizzlies finished second in the Southwest Division. Also, the Clippers secured home court advantage over the Grizzlies based on head-to-head record (3–1).
- The Los Angeles Lakers clinched #7 seed over Houston based on winning percentage against Western Conference teams (the Lakers' .538 to the Rockets' .462).

== Playoffs ==
The playoffs began on April 20, 2013, and concluded with the 2013 NBA Finals, which began on June 6 between the Miami Heat and the San Antonio Spurs

=== Bracket ===
First Round	Conference Semifinals
E1	Miami*	4
E8	Milwaukee	0
E1	Miami*	4
E5	Chicago	1
E4	Brooklyn	3
E5	Chicago	4
Eastern Conference
E3	Indiana*	4
E6	Atlanta	2
E3	Indiana*	4
E2	New York*	2
E2	New York*	4
E7	Boston	2
W1	Oklahoma City*	4
W8	Houston	2
W1	Oklahoma City*	1
W5	Memphis	4
W4	LA Clippers*	2
W5	Memphis	4
Western Conference
W3	Denver	2
W6	Golden State	4
W6	Golden State	2
W2	San Antonio*	4
W2	San Antonio*	4
W7	LA Lakers	0

Conference Finals
E1	Miami*	4
E3	Indiana*	3
W5	Memphis	0
W2	San Antonio*	4

NBA Finals
E1	Miami*	4
W2	San Antonio*	3

- * Division winner
- Bold Series winner
- Italic Team with home-court advantage

== Statistics leaders ==
=== Individual statistic leaders ===
Category	Player	Team	Statistics
Points per game	Carmelo Anthony	New York Knicks	28.7
Rebounds per game	Dwight Howard	Los Angeles Lakers	12.4
Assists per game	Rajon Rondo	Boston Celtics	11.1
Steals per game	Chris Paul	Los Angeles Clippers	2.41
Blocks per game	Serge Ibaka	Oklahoma City Thunder	3.03
Fouls per game	Dwight Howard	Los Angeles Lakers	3.8
Turnovers per game	Jrue Holiday	Philadelphia 76ers	3.8
Minutes per game	Luol Deng	Chicago Bulls	38.7
Efficiency per game	LeBron James	Miami Heat	31.6
FG%	DeAndre Jordan	Los Angeles Clippers	64.3%
FT%	Kevin Durant	Oklahoma City Thunder	90.5%
3FG%	José Calderón	Detroit Pistons/Toronto Raptors	46.1%
Double-Doubles	David Lee	Golden State Warriors	56
Triple-Doubles	Rajon Rondo	Boston Celtics	5

=== Individual game highs ===
Category	Player	Team	Statistics
Points	Stephen Curry	Golden State Warriors	54
Rebounds	Nikola Vučević	Orlando Magic	29
Assists	Rajon Rondo	Boston Celtics	20
Steals	Kemba Walker	Charlotte Bobcats	8
Steals	Ricky Rubio	Minnesota Timberwolves	8
Blocks	Roy Hibbert	Indiana Pacers	11
Blocks	Joakim Noah	Chicago Bulls	11
Three Pointers	Stephen Curry	Golden State Warriors	11
Three Pointers	Deron Williams	Brooklyn Nets	11

=== Team statistic leaders ===
Category	Team	Statistics
Points per game	Denver Nuggets	106.1
Rebounds per game	Indiana Pacers	45.9
Assists per game	San Antonio Spurs	25.1
Steals per game	Los Angeles Clippers	9.6
Blocks per game	Oklahoma City Thunder	7.6
Turnovers per game	Houston Rockets	16.4
Fouls per game	Toronto Raptors	22.4
FG%	Miami Heat	49.6%
FT%	Oklahoma City Thunder	82.8%
3FG%	Golden State Warriors	40.3%
±	Oklahoma City Thunder	9.2

== Awards ==
=== Yearly awards ===
- Most Valuable Player: LeBron James, Miami Heat
- Defensive Player of the Year: Marc Gasol, Memphis Grizzlies
- Rookie of the Year: Damian Lillard, Portland Trail Blazers
- Sixth Man of the Year: J. R. Smith, New York Knicks
- Most Improved Player: Paul George, Indiana Pacers
- Coach of the Year: George Karl, Denver Nuggets
- Executive of the Year: Masai Ujiri, Denver Nuggets
- Sportsmanship Award: Jason Kidd, New York Knicks
- J. Walter Kennedy Citizenship Award: Kenneth Faried, Denver Nuggets
- Twyman–Stokes Teammate of the Year Award: Chauncey Billups, Los Angeles Clippers

- All-NBA First Team:
  - F LeBron James, Miami Heat
  - F Kevin Durant, Oklahoma City Thunder
  - C Tim Duncan, San Antonio Spurs
  - G Kobe Bryant, Los Angeles Lakers
  - G Chris Paul, Los Angeles Clippers
- All-NBA Second Team:
  - F Carmelo Anthony, New York Knicks
  - F Blake Griffin, Los Angeles Clippers
  - C Marc Gasol, Memphis Grizzlies
  - G Russell Westbrook, Oklahoma City Thunder
  - G Tony Parker, San Antonio Spurs
- All-NBA Third Team:
  - F Paul George, Indiana Pacers
  - F David Lee, Golden State Warriors
  - C Dwight Howard, Los Angeles Lakers
  - G James Harden, Houston Rockets
  - G Dwyane Wade, Miami Heat

- NBA All-Defensive First Team:
  - F LeBron James, Miami Heat
  - F Serge Ibaka, Oklahoma City Thunder
  - C Joakim Noah, Chicago Bulls
  - C Tyson Chandler, New York Knicks
  - G Tony Allen, Memphis Grizzlies
  - G Chris Paul, Los Angeles Clippers
- NBA All-Defensive Second Team:
  - F Paul George, Indiana Pacers
  - F Tim Duncan, San Antonio Spurs
  - C Marc Gasol, Memphis Grizzlies
  - G Avery Bradley, Boston Celtics
  - G Mike Conley Jr., Memphis Grizzlies

- NBA All-Rookie First Team:
  - Damian Lillard, Portland Trail Blazers
  - Bradley Beal, Washington Wizards
  - Anthony Davis, New Orleans Hornets
  - Dion Waiters, Cleveland Cavaliers
  - Harrison Barnes, Golden State Warriors
- NBA All-Rookie Second Team:
  - Andre Drummond, Detroit Pistons
  - Jonas Valančiūnas, Toronto Raptors
  - Michael Kidd-Gilchrist, Charlotte Bobcats
  - Kyle Singler, Detroit Pistons
  - Tyler Zeller, Cleveland Cavaliers

=== Players of the week ===
The following players were named the Eastern and Western Conference Players of the Week.

Week	Eastern Conference	Western Conference	Ref.
Oct. 30 – Nov. 4	Brandon Jennings (Milwaukee Bucks) (1/2)	James Harden (Houston Rockets) (1/3)	
Nov. 5 – Nov. 11	LeBron James (Miami Heat) (1/6)	Kenneth Faried (Denver Nuggets) (1/1)	
Nov. 12 – Nov. 18	LeBron James (Miami Heat) (2/6)	Kevin Durant (Oklahoma City Thunder) (1/4)	
Nov. 19 – Nov. 25	Al Horford (Atlanta Hawks) (1/1)	Tim Duncan (San Antonio Spurs) (1/1)	
Nov. 26 – Dec. 2	Carmelo Anthony (New York Knicks) (1/4)	Kevin Durant (Oklahoma City Thunder) (2/4)	
Dec. 3 – Dec. 9	Josh Smith (Atlanta Hawks) (1/1)	Blake Griffin (Los Angeles Clippers) (1/1)	
Dec. 10 – Dec. 16	Paul George (Indiana Pacers) (1/1)	David Lee (Golden State Warriors) (1/2)	
Dec. 17 – Dec. 23	LeBron James (Miami Heat) (3/6)	Chris Paul (Los Angeles Clippers) (1/1)	
Dec. 24 – Dec. 30	Monta Ellis (Milwaukee Bucks) (1/2)	Greivis Vásquez (New Orleans Hornets) (1/1)	
Dec. 31 – Jan. 6	Carmelo Anthony (New York Knicks) (2/4)	James Harden (Houston Rockets) (2/3)	
Jan. 7 – Jan. 13	Brandon Jennings (Milwaukee Bucks) (2/2)	Kevin Durant (Oklahoma City Thunder) (3/4)	
Jan. 14 – Jan. 20	Carlos Boozer (Chicago Bulls) (1/1)	Kevin Durant (Oklahoma City Thunder) (4/4)	
Jan. 21 – Jan. 27	Kyrie Irving (Cleveland Cavaliers) (1/1)	Tony Parker (San Antonio Spurs) (1/1)	
Jan. 28 – Feb. 3	Nate Robinson (Chicago Bulls) (1/1)	David Lee (Golden State Warriors) (2/2)	
Feb. 4 – Feb. 10	LeBron James (Miami Heat) (4/6)	Russell Westbrook (Oklahoma City Thunder) (1/1)	
Feb. 19 – Feb. 24	LeBron James (Miami Heat) (5/6)	Kobe Bryant (Los Angeles Lakers) (1/3)	
Feb. 25 – Mar. 3	Monta Ellis (Milwaukee Bucks) (2/2)	Ty Lawson (Denver Nuggets) (1/1)	
Mar. 4 – Mar. 10	Dwyane Wade (Miami Heat) (1/1)	Kobe Bryant (Los Angeles Lakers) (2/3)	
Mar. 11 – Mar. 17	John Wall (Washington Wizards) (1/1)	LaMarcus Aldridge (Portland Trail Blazers) (1/1)	
Mar. 18 – Mar. 24	LeBron James (Miami Heat) (6/6)	James Harden (Houston Rockets) (3/3)	
Mar. 25 – Mar. 31	J. R. Smith (New York Knicks) (1/1)	Al Jefferson (Utah Jazz) (1/1)	
Apr. 1 – Apr. 7	Carmelo Anthony (New York Knicks) (3/4)	Nikola Peković (Minnesota Timberwolves) (1/1)	
Apr. 8 – Apr. 14	Carmelo Anthony (New York Knicks) (4/4)	Kobe Bryant (Los Angeles Lakers) (3/3)	

=== Players of the month ===
The following players were named the Eastern and Western Conference Players of the Month.

Month	Eastern Conference	Western Conference	Ref.
October – November	LeBron James (Miami Heat) (1/5)	Kevin Durant (Oklahoma City Thunder) (1/2)	
December	LeBron James (Miami Heat) (2/5)	Chris Paul (Los Angeles Clippers) (1/1)	
January	LeBron James (Miami Heat) (3/5)	Tony Parker (San Antonio Spurs) (1/1)	
February	LeBron James (Miami Heat) (4/5)	Kobe Bryant (Los Angeles Lakers) (1/1)	
March	LeBron James (Miami Heat) (5/5)	Kevin Durant (Oklahoma City Thunder) (2/2)	
April	Carmelo Anthony (New York Knicks) (1/1)	Stephen Curry (Golden State Warriors) (1/1)	

=== Rookies of the month ===
The following players were named the Eastern and Western Conference Rookies of the Month.

Month	Eastern Conference	Western Conference	Ref.
October – November	Michael Kidd-Gilchrist (Charlotte Bobcats) (1/1)	Damian Lillard (Portland Trail Blazers) (1/6)	
December	Bradley Beal (Washington Wizards) (1/2)	Damian Lillard (Portland Trail Blazers) (2/6)	
January	Bradley Beal (Washington Wizards) (2/2)	Damian Lillard (Portland Trail Blazers) (3/6)	
February	Dion Waiters (Cleveland Cavaliers) (1/1)	Damian Lillard (Portland Trail Blazers) (4/6)	
March	Jonas Valančiūnas (Toronto Raptors) (1/1)	Damian Lillard (Portland Trail Blazers) (5/6)	
April	Chris Copeland (New York Knicks) (1/1)	Damian Lillard (Portland Trail Blazers) (6/6)	

=== Coaches of the month ===
The following coaches were named the Eastern and Western Conference Coaches of the Month.

Month	Eastern Conference	Western Conference	Ref.
October – November	Avery Johnson (Brooklyn Nets) (1/1)	Lionel Hollins (Memphis Grizzlies) (1/2)	
December	Larry Drew (Atlanta Hawks) (1/1)	Vinny Del Negro (Los Angeles Clippers) (1/1)	
January	Tom Thibodeau (Chicago Bulls) (1/1)	George Karl (Denver Nuggets) (1/2)	
February	Erik Spoelstra (Miami Heat) (1/2)	Lionel Hollins (Memphis Grizzlies) (2/2)	
March	Erik Spoelstra (Miami Heat) (2/2)	George Karl (Denver Nuggets) (2/2)	
April	Mike Woodson (New York Knicks) (1/1)	Mike D'Antoni (Los Angeles Lakers) (1/1)	

== Notable occurrences ==
- The New Jersey Nets moved to Brooklyn and became the Brooklyn Nets, returning to the state the team played in when it first joined the NBA from the ABA back in 1976. The Nets now play at the Barclays Center. The first game there would have pitted the Nets against the New York Knicks on November 1, but due to the damage caused by Hurricane Sandy, it was postponed to November 26. Instead the Nets opened the new season in Brooklyn against the Toronto Raptors on November 3, winning the game by a score of 107–100.
- The Sacramento Kings' home arena, the Power Balance Pavilion, was renamed the Sleep Train Arena on November 1. The arena's naming rights were acquired by The Sleep Train mattress company in the wake of Power Balance's legal issues and eventual bankruptcy.
- The center position in the All-Star Game player balloting was eliminated, beginning with the 2013 game, citing a more perimeter-oriented game and increased use of smaller, faster lineups. Fans can now select three generic frontcourt players in addition to any two guards.
- The Orlando Magic traded franchise star center Dwight Howard to the Los Angeles Lakers. The Lakers then sent Andrew Bynum to the Philadelphia 76ers, who in turn sent Andre Iguodala to the Denver Nuggets. Another trade also netted the Lakers franchise star point guard Steve Nash from the Phoenix Suns, who in turn sent them four total draft picks.
- In the last trade before entering the regular season, the Oklahoma City Thunder sent Sixth Man of the Year James Harden, Daequan Cook, Lazar Hayward and Cole Aldrich to the Houston Rockets in exchange for Kevin Martin, Jeremy Lamb, and three future draft picks.
- On November 30, 2012, the San Antonio Spurs were fined $250,000 for sitting out Tim Duncan, Tony Parker, Manu Ginóbili and Danny Green prior to a nationally televised Thursday game against the Miami Heat, citing as an act "detrimental to fan interest and to the league".
- On December 5, 2012, Kobe Bryant became the 5th player (Kareem Abdul-Jabbar, Karl Malone, Michael Jordan, and Wilt Chamberlain) all time and the fourth Laker (Chamberlain, Abdul-Jabbar, and Malone) to score 30,000 career points in NBA history, finishing the game with 29 points against the New Orleans Hornets in a 103–87 win. His teammate Metta World Peace also became the 6th player (Gary Payton, Reggie Miller, Jason Kidd, Paul Pierce, and Bryant) all to record 12,000 points, 4,000 rebounds, 1,500 steals, and 1,000 3-pointers made.
- On December 21, 2012, the Denver Nuggets shot a record-low 0–22 from the three–point area in a 101–93 loss to the Portland Trail Blazers, who originally held that record by going 0–20 a week prior.
- On January 8, 2013, Steve Nash became the fifth player to reach 10,000 career assists.
- On January 12, 2013, the Phoenix Suns became the fourth fastest NBA team (tenth team overall) to gain 2,000 total victories in the regular season (with the only faster teams being the Minneapolis/Los Angeles Lakers, Boston Celtics, and Syracuse Nationals/Philadelphia 76ers), with a 97–81 road victory against the Chicago Bulls.
- On January 16, 2013, LeBron James became the youngest player to reach 20,000 career points, while also reaching 5,000 assists in the same game.
- On January 27, 2013, Dirk Nowitzki passed Allen Iverson for 18th place on the NBA's all-time scoring list in a 110–95 victory over the Phoenix Suns. Shawn Marion also played his 1,000th game in the NBA against the team that first drafted him back in 1999, which was a pick that, ironically, was first owned by Dallas.
- On January 30, 2013, the Memphis Grizzlies participated in a three-way trade that sent their leading scorer Rudy Gay and Hamed Haddadi to the Toronto Raptors, with Toronto trading José Calderón to the Detroit Pistons in exchange for Memphis gaining Toronto's Ed Davis, Detroit's Austin Daye, and Detroit's Tayshaun Prince.
- On February 18, 2013, Los Angeles Lakers' owner Jerry Buss died at age 80 at 5:55 a.m. after being hospitalized at Cedars-Sinai Medical Center with an undisclosed form of cancer. His immediate cause of death was listed as kidney failure. After the All-star break vs the Boston Celtics, the Lakers debut their uniforms with the Patch of the initials "JB" in honor of Buss.
- On February 27, 2013, Tim Duncan became the 15th player to reach 13,000 career rebounds in a 105–101 overtime loss to the Phoenix Suns. The Suns would also end an 18-game home winning streak favoring the San Antonio Spurs.
- On February 27, 2013, Stephen Curry scored 54 points but his Warriors lost to the Knicks, 109–105. He shot 18 for 28 from the field, making a Warriors franchise-record 11 three-pointers on 11 of 13 shooting from 3-point range. The 54 points Curry had was the third highest total by a Knicks opponent in the current Madison Square Garden, trailing Kobe Bryant's 61 points on February 2, 2009, and Michael Jordan's 55 points on March 28, 1995. His 54 points were the most anyone recorded in the 2012–13 season. The 11 3-pointers were good for second most all-time in a game, 1 behind the record 12 made by Bryant (1/7/03) and Donyell Marshall (3/13/05).
- On February 28, 2013, Vince Carter moved to 23rd on the all-time scoring list.
- In a March 12, 2013 game against his former team, the Orlando Magic, Los Angeles Laker Dwight Howard tied his own NBA record of 39 free throw attempts. He made 25 of the 39 attempts. He had previously set the league mark with 39 free throw attempts in a game while playing for the Orlando Magic vs. the Golden State Warriors on January 12, 2012.
- On March 22, 2013, Gregg Popovich became the second head coach in NBA history besides Jerry Sloan to win 900 games with one team as the San Antonio Spurs defeated the Utah Jazz. Tim Duncan would also surpass Shaquille O'Neal to become the 13th all-time rebounding leader.
- On March 27, 2013, the Chicago Bulls ended Miami Heat's 27–game winning streak which began on February 3 when the Heat defeated the Toronto Raptors 100–85. The Bulls won the game 101–97. It was second longest in NBA history, only surpassed by the Lakers' 33-game winning streak in the 1971–72 season until the Golden State Warriors' 28-game winning streak in 2015.
- On March 30, 2013, Kobe Bryant moved to 4th on the all-time scoring list, passing Wilt Chamberlain in a 103–98 victory against the Sacramento Kings.
- On April 6, 2013, Rick Adelman became the eighth head coach in NBA history to win 1,000 games as a head coach. This came as the Minnesota Timberwolves defeated the Detroit Pistons 107–101.
- On April 17, 2013, in the Warriors' regular season finale against the Portland Trail Blazers, Stephen Curry broke the NBA single-season record for most 3-pointers with his 270th of the season. The previous record was held by Ray Allen who had 269 in 2005–2006 with the Seattle SuperSonics. Curry added 2 more 3-pointers to finish the season with 272 in 600 attempts, 53 less than Allen attempted to set his record. Curry and teammate Klay Thompson set the record for most 3-pointers by a duo with 483, 48 more than the previous record.
- The Dallas Mavericks are eliminated from making the playoffs for the first time since 2000, ending their 12-year streak. They lost to the Phoenix Suns 102–91 and were eliminated a few hours later when the Los Angeles Lakers won against the Portland Trail Blazers 113–106.
- The 2013 Boston Marathon bombing led to the cancellation of the game between the Indiana Pacers and the Boston Celtics, which was originally scheduled for April 16. As both teams' playoff positions were already set, the game was not rescheduled, instead they were forced to have a bye. Both teams finished the season with only 81 regular season games, making it the first time in 58 seasons that some teams played more regular season games than others.
- Dwight Howard led the league in defensive rebounds for the sixth consecutive season and sixth season overall in his career, both league records. He led the NBA in defensive rebounds every season starting with the 2007–08 season.
- In the cover story of the May 6, 2013 issue of Sports Illustrated, written by Jason Collins himself and posted on the magazine's website on April 29, 2013, he came out as gay, becoming the first active male athlete from one of the four major American professional team sports to publicly do so.
- This was the final season for the New Orleans Hornets, who announced that they would change their name to the Pelicans, effective in 2013–14. In turn, the team then known as the Charlotte Bobcats would reclaim the Pelicans' former name and records from the original team's tenure in the Queen City, but it would also keep its own records from its 2004 founding up to this point.

== See also ==
- List of NBA regular season records
