= Nikola Peković =

Montenegrin basketball player (born 1986)

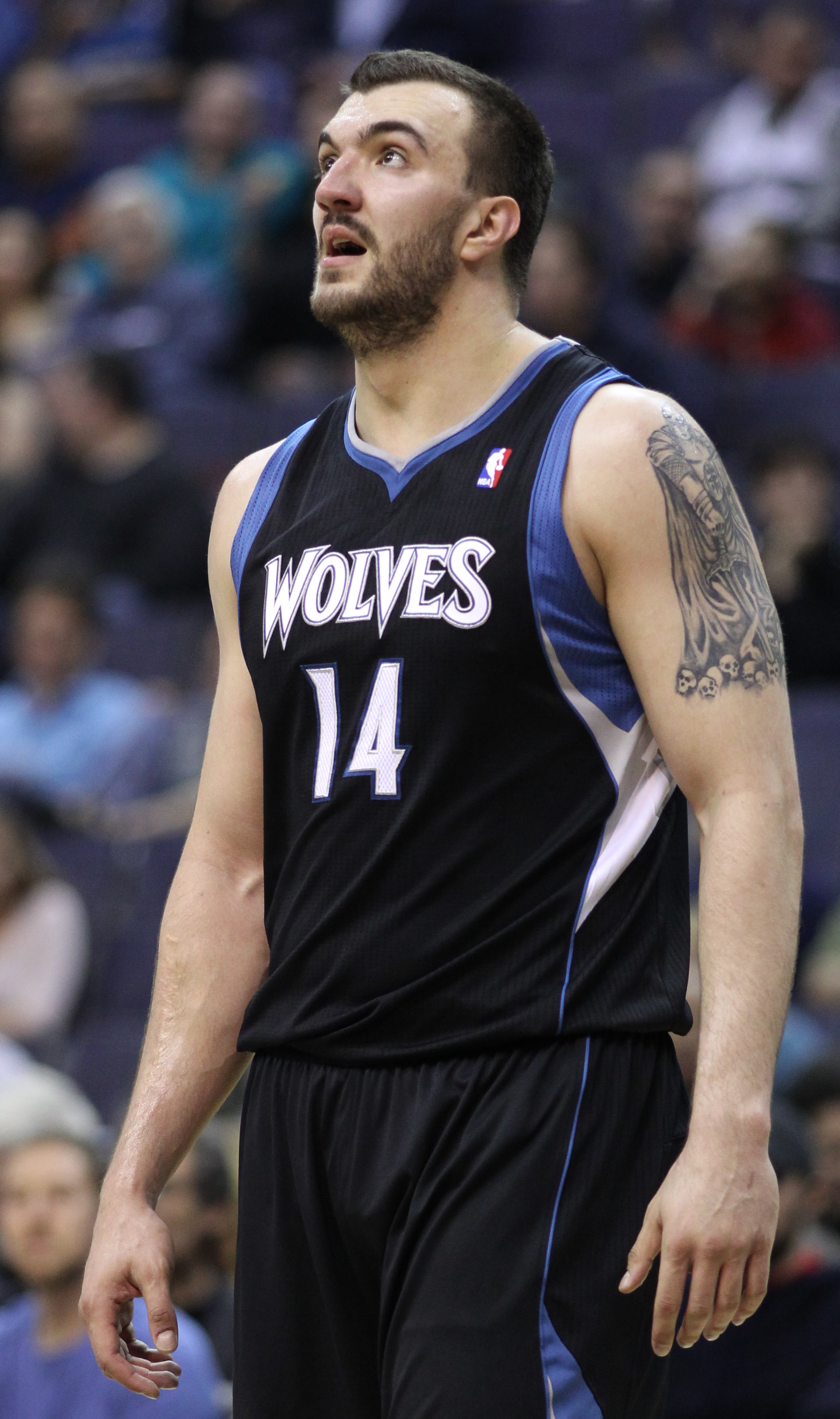
- Peković with the Timberwolves in 2011

President of the Basketball Federation of Montenegro
- Incumbent
- Assumed office 26 April 2021
- Preceded by: Veselin Barović

President of KK Partizan
- In office 8 September 2015 – 14 June 2017
- Preceded by: Predrag Danilović
- Succeeded by: Ostoja Mijailović

Personal details
- Born: 3 January 1986 (age 40) Bijelo Polje, SR Montenegro, SFR Yugoslavia
- Basketball career

Personal information
- Listed height: 6 ft 11 in (2.11 m)
- Listed weight: 307 lb (139 kg)

Career information
- NBA draft: 2008: 2nd round, 31st overall pick
- Drafted by: Minnesota Timberwolves
- Playing career: 2003–2017
- Position: Center
- Number: 14

Career history
- 2003–2005: Atlas
- 2004–2005: →Avala Ada
- 2005–2008: Partizan
- 2008–2010: Panathinaikos
- 2010–2017: Minnesota Timberwolves
- 2011: Partizan

Career highlights
- EuroLeague champion (2009); All-EuroLeague First Team (2009); All-EuroLeague Second Team (2008); 2× Greek League champion (2009, 2010); All-Greek League Team (2009); Greek Cup winner (2009); 2× ABA League champion (2007, 2008); ABA League Final Four MVP (2008); 2× Serbian League champion (2007, 2008); YUBA League champion (2006); Serbian Cup winner (2008)
- Stats at NBA.com
- Stats at Basketball Reference
Medals
Men's basketball
Representing Serbia and Montenegro
U20 European Championship
Gold medal – first place	2006 Turkey	Under-20 Team
Bronze medal – third place	2005 Russia	Under-20 Team

Nikola Peković (Serbian Cyrillic: Никола Пековић; born 3 January 1986) is a Montenegrin businessman, basketball executive and former professional player who is the current president of the Basketball Federation of Montenegro. He began his playing career in Europe before spending seven years with the Minnesota Timberwolves of the National Basketball Association (NBA). Standing at 6 ft 11 in (2.11 m), he played at the center position. A two-time All-EuroLeague selection, he represented the senior Montenegrin national basketball team.

== Professional career ==
=== Early years ===
Peković began playing basketball with a junior team from Podgorica at the age of 15. In 2003, he moved to Belgrade, Serbia and signed his first professional contract with Atlas during the summer.

=== Partizan (2005–2008) ===
After two years there, Peković joined the national champions Partizan in July 2005. With Black and Whites, he won three consecutive Basketball League of Serbia titles, two Adriatic League and Radivoj Korać Cup titles. Peković was named the MVP of the Adriatic League Final Four in 2008. The same year, he also earned an All-Euroleague Second Team selection for leading Partizan to the competition's quarterfinals.

=== Panathinaikos (2008–2010) ===
In the summer of 2008, Peković joined the Greek champions Panathinaikos. He signed a three-year contract worth €4.5 million net income. He averaged 13.0 points and 3.8 rebounds in just over 18 minutes per contest, helping Panathinaikos win the 2008–09 EuroLeague title. Peković consequently established himself as one of Europe's elite centers, being voted to the All-EuroLeague First Team. With PAO, he also won two Greek League titles and the 2009 Greek Cup.

=== Minnesota Timberwolves (2010–2017) ===
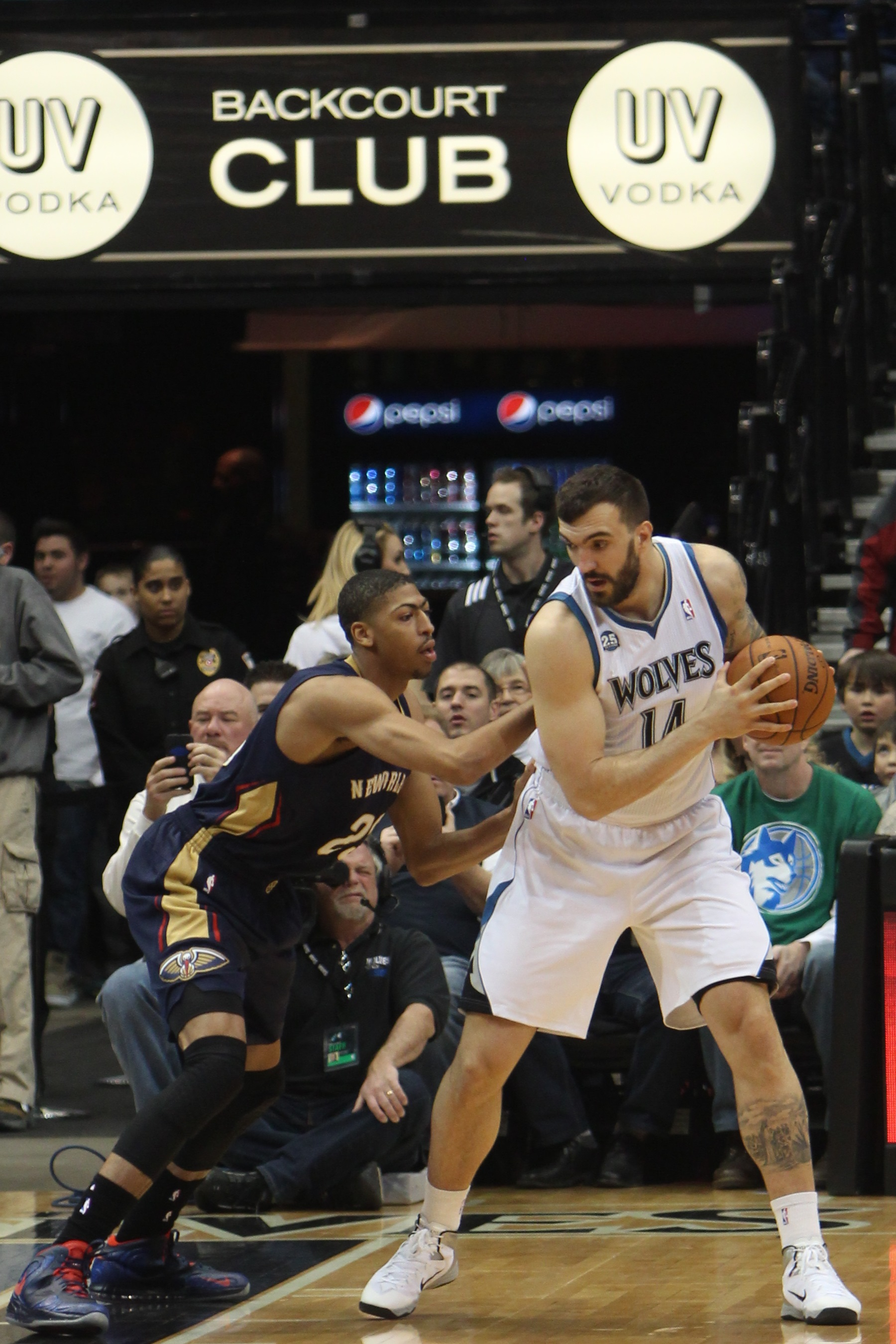
Peković guarded by Anthony Davis in 2014

Peković was selected with the 31st overall pick in the 2008 NBA draft by the Minnesota Timberwolves. Many draft experts considered him a top 10 pick, but due to his contract situation with his team in Europe, he was selected much lower. He was considered a lock to be drafted with the first pick of the second round because players selected in the second round are not subject to the rookie scale contracts of the first round. This meant that the team that drafted him would be able to pay him more than those players selected later in the first round. Due to the amount of money Peković was making in Europe already, he likely would not have made the jump to the NBA for the amount of money that could be paid to a late first round player.

==== Rookie season (2010–2011) ====
On 30 June 2010, two years after being drafted, Peković signed a three-year, $13 million contract with the Timberwolves. As a rookie in the NBA in 2010–11, Peković averaged 5.5 points and 3.0 rebounds per game.

On 16 August 2011, Peković signed a contract to play for his former team Partizan until the end of the 2011 NBA lockout. In 7 Euroleague games with Partizan, he led the team averaging 15.4 points and 4.6 rebounds. As the NBA lockout ended on 8 December 2011, he had to return to the United States.

==== Rise to prominence (2011–2014) ====
The 2011–12 shortened NBA season started on 25 December 2011. Upon returning to Minnesota, through January 2012, Peković stepped in for an injured Darko Miličić as the starting center for the Timberwolves. He finished the 2011–12 season with 13.9 points and 7.4 rebounds in 26.9 minutes per game. In voting for the Most Improved Player, Peković finished third behind Orlando's Ryan Anderson and Milwaukee's Ersan İlyasova.

During the 2012–13 NBA season, Peković cemented his position of starting center and with team's superstar Kevin Love, led the Timberwolves frontcourt. With 31–51 record, it was the first season since Kevin Garnett's departure that the Timberwolves won more than 30 regular season games. Peković averaged 16.3 points and career-high 8.8 rebounds per game.

On 14 August 2013, Peković re-signed with the Timberwolves to a five-year, $60 million deal. On 27 January 2014, he suffered an ankle injury that hindered him for the rest of the season; he played only 10 games until the end of the season. The 2013–14 season for the Timberwolves was even more successful than previous as they managed to win 40 games. Over the season, Peković averaged a career-high 17.5 points and 8.7 rebounds over 54 regular season games.

In August 2014, the Timberwolves traded Love in a three-team trade receiving Andrew Wiggins, starting the new era of the franchise.

==== Injury-plagued seasons (2014–2017) ====
During the 2014–15 season, Peković managed to play only 31 games due to a right ankle injury, averaging 12.5 points per game. On 8 April 2015, Peković had surgery on his right Achilles tendon in hopes of addressing the pain in his bothersome right foot. The departure of Love, Peković's absence from the court and other factors resulted in the worst league record of 16–66 for the Timberwolves. Eventually the Timberwolves won the draft lottery and selected Karl-Anthony Towns with the first overall pick, strengthening their core of young talented players in Wiggins and Zach LaVine.

Entering his third season of a new contract, Peković was still enduring chronically sore ankles and Achilles. He made his season debut for the Timberwolves on 6 January 2016, playing for the first time since 11 March 2015. In 16 minutes of action off the bench, he scored 12 points in a loss to the Denver Nuggets. Over the season, he appeared in just 12 games, averaging career lows of 4.5 points and 1.8 rebounds.

On 25 September 2016, Peković was ruled out for the entire 2016–17 season due to recurring right ankle pain. At the time, it appeared unlikely Peković would ever return to the court with the Timberwolves. On 20 June 2017, following the conclusion of the 2016–17 season, Peković was waived by the Timberwolves.

== National team career ==
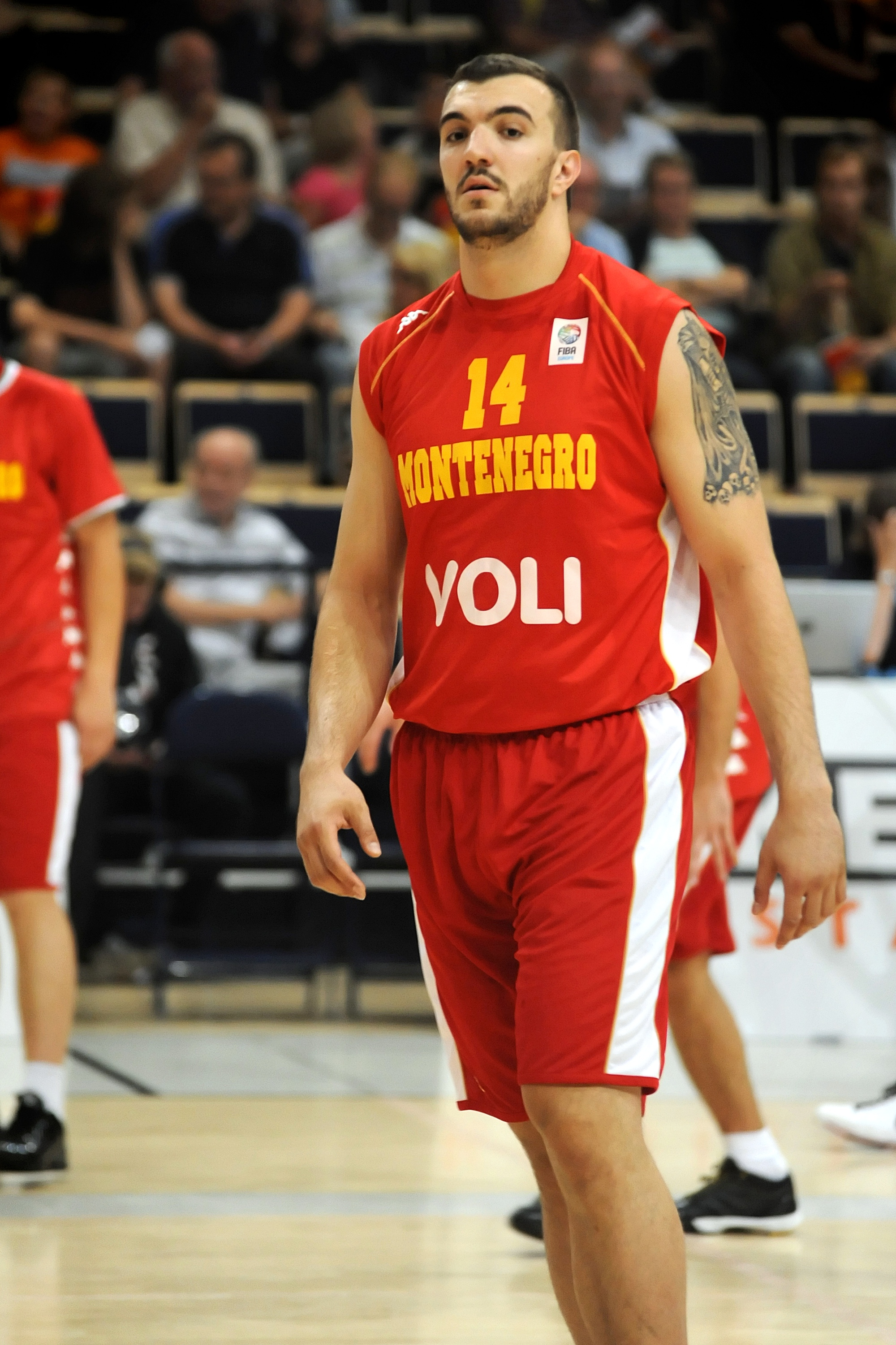
Peković with Montenegro in 2010

=== Serbia and Montenegro junior national team ===
While playing with the youth national teams of Serbia and Montenegro, Peković received the bronze medal at the 2005 European Under-20 Championship, in Russia. He also won the gold medal with his generation at the 2006 tournament, which was held in Turkey.

=== Montenegro national team ===
Peković represented the senior Montenegrin national team at the EuroBasket 2011, which was held in Lithuania. Over 5 tournament games, he averaged 13.0 points and 6.4 rebounds per game, as Montenegro finished the tournament after being eliminated after the first phase.

== Career statistics ==
Legend
GP	Games played	GS	Games started	MPG	Minutes per game
FG%	Field-goal percentage	3P%	3-point field-goal percentage	FT%	Free-throw percentage
RPG	Rebounds per game	APG	Assists per game	SPG	Steals per game
BPG	Blocks per game	PPG	Points per game	PIR	Performance index rating
**Bold**	Career high

=== NBA ===
==== Regular season ====
Year	Team	GP	GS	MPG	FG%	3P%	FT%	RPG	APG	SPG	BPG	PPG
2010–11	Minnesota	**65**	11	13.6	.517	.000	.763	3.0	.4	.3	.5	5.5
2011–12	Minnesota	47	35	26.9	**.564**	.000	.743	7.4	.7	.6	.7	13.9
2012–13	Minnesota	62	**62**	**31.6**	.520	.000	.744	**8.8**	**.9**	**.7**	**.8**	16.3
2013–14	Minnesota	54	54	30.8	.541	.000	.747	8.7	**.9**	.6	.4	**17.5**
2014–15	Minnesota	31	29	26.3	.424	.000	**.837**	7.5	**.9**	.6	.4	12.5
2015–16	Minnesota	12	3	13.0	.380	.000	.800	1.8	**.9**	.1	.0	4.5
Career		271	194	24.9	.518	.000	.760	6.7	.7	.5	.6	12.6

=== EuroLeague ===
†	Denotes seasons in which Peković won the EuroLeague

Year	Team	GP	GS	MPG	FG%	3P%	FT%	RPG	APG	SPG	BPG	PPG	PIR
2005–06	Partizan	14	2	18.0	.574	.000	.677	3.6	.3	.5	.4	7.1	5.9
2006–07	Partizan	20	3	13.5	.593	.000	.714	2.5	.2	.6	.3	4.8	3.3
2007–08	Partizan	**23**	**14**	26.5	.584	.000	.773	**6.9**	**.8**	**.7**	.6	**16.4**	**19.6**
2008–09†	Panathinaikos	21	9	18.1	**.634**	.000	.775	3.8	.3	.3	**.7**	13.0	14.0
2009–10	Panathinaikos	13	10	21.6	.607	.000	.727	3.5	.5	.6	.4	14.8	14.9
2011–12	Partizan	7	7	**27.2**	.549	.000	**.811**	4.6	.7	.3	.3	15.4	16.7
Career		98	45	20.5	.594	.000	.757	4.3	.5	.5	.5	11.7	12.3

== Executive career ==
=== KK Partizan ===
In September 2015, Peković accepted an offer by the KK Partizan board of directors of becoming the club's new president, following the late August 2015 resignation of Sasha Danilović. Soon after taking the position, he hired Petar Božić to be the club's new head coach, thus not offering Duško Vujošević a new contract.

On 14 June 2017, he resigned from the position.

=== Montenegrin Basketball Federation (KSCG) ===
In January 2020, Peković became a team manager for the Montenegro national basketball team, while on 26 April 2020 he was named the president of the Basketball Federation of Montenegro. Few hours prior to being named on this position, Peković met with Deputy Prime Minister Dritan Abazović, with the two holding a meeting about the future of basketball in Montenegro.

In June 2022, Zlatibor added Peković as a member of their managing board.

== Personal life ==
Peković is an ethnic Serb and a Serbian Orthodox Christian. He spends his off-seasons in Serbia, particularly in Zlatibor where he has built an apartment house, as well as in Belgrade. He has several Serb-themed tattoos, including the Battle of Kosovo and the Serbian cross.

Peković is connected to several underworld figures, most notably Montenegrin drug lord Darko Šarić who has been held in custody since 2011. Peković has numerous business investments with Šarić in Serbia and Montenegro. In October 2018, Peković took over a 1.15-million-euro debt from Šarić's brother.

On 10 October 2020, Peković was reported to have been hospitalized after being infected by coronavirus.

== See also ==
- List of European basketball players in the United States
- List of Montenegrin NBA players
- List of Serbian NBA players

Sporting positions
Preceded by Predrag Danilović	President of KK Partizan; 2015–2017	Succeeded by Ostoja Mijailović
Preceded by Veselin Barović	President of the Basketball Federation of Montenegro; 2021–present	Succeeded by Incumbent
