= Courtney Lee =

American basketball player (born 1985)

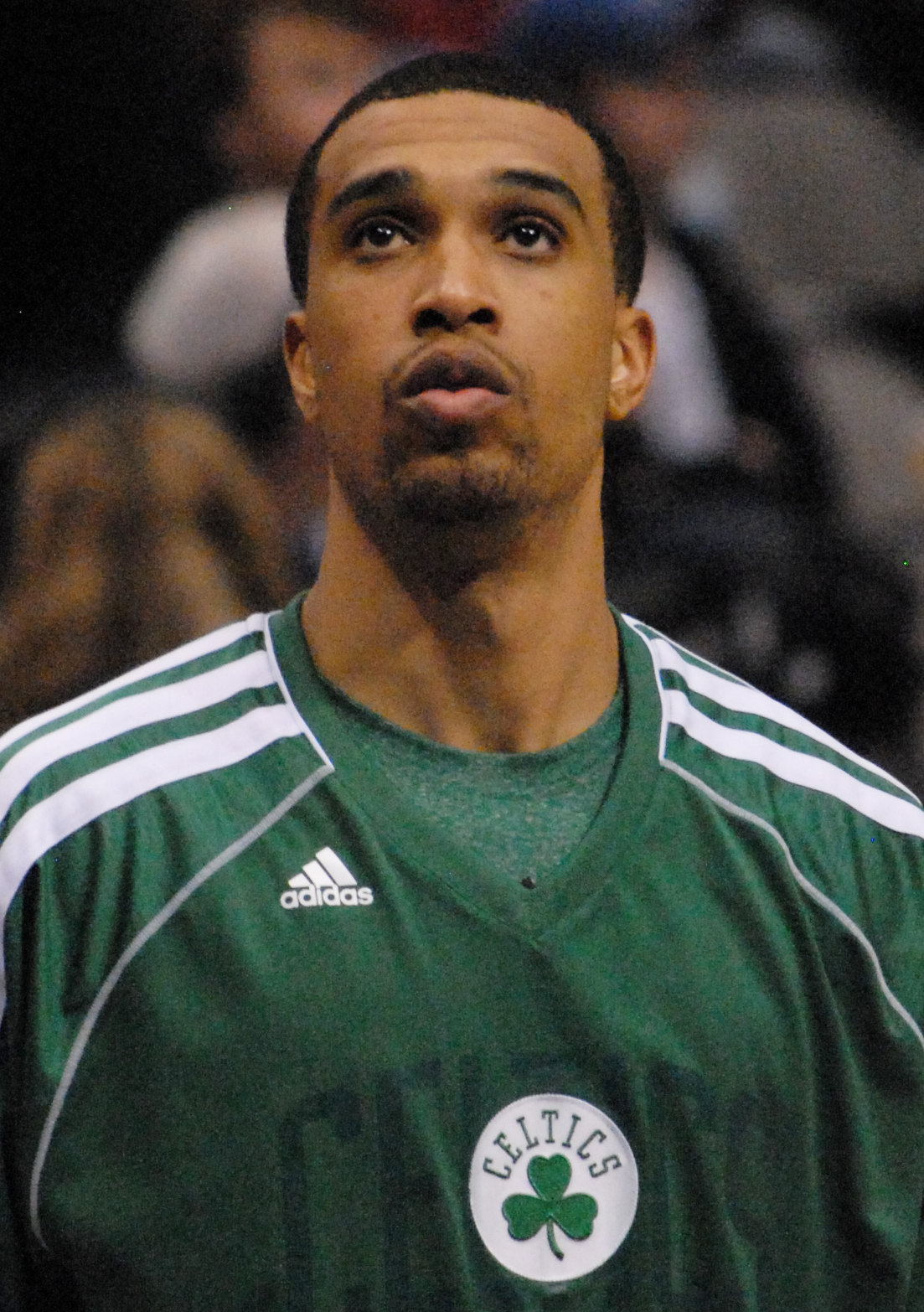
- Lee with the Boston Celtics in 2013

Personal information
- Born: October 3, 1985 (age 40) Indianapolis, Indiana, U.S.
- Listed height: 6 ft 5 in (1.96 m)
- Listed weight: 215 lb (98 kg)

Career information
- High school: Pike (Indianapolis, Indiana)
- College: Western Kentucky (2004–2008)
- NBA draft: 2008: 1st round, 22nd overall pick
- Drafted by: Orlando Magic
- Playing career: 2008–2020
- Position: Shooting guard
- Number: 11, 6, 5, 1

Career history
- 2008–2009: Orlando Magic
- 2009–2010: New Jersey Nets
- 2010–2012: Houston Rockets
- 2012–2014: Boston Celtics
- 2014–2016: Memphis Grizzlies
- 2016: Charlotte Hornets
- 2016–2019: New York Knicks
- 2018: →Westchester Knicks
- 2019–2020: Dallas Mavericks

Career highlights
- Sun Belt Player of the Year (2008); 3× First-team All-Sun Belt (2006–2008); No. 32 jersey retired by Western Kentucky Hilltoppers
- Stats at NBA.com
- Stats at Basketball Reference

Courtney Lee (born October 3, 1985) is an American former professional basketball player. He played college basketball for the Western Kentucky Hilltoppers.

Lee was selected by the Orlando Magic with the 22nd overall pick in the 2008 NBA draft and was traded in June 2009 to the New Jersey Nets. In August 2010, he was traded to the Houston Rockets. In July 2012, Lee was dealt to the Boston Celtics. He was traded to the Memphis Grizzlies in January 2014 before being dealt to the Charlotte Hornets in February 2016. In July, Lee signed with the New York Knicks, where he spent three seasons before being traded to the Dallas Mavericks in January 2019.

== Early life and high school ==
Lee was born in Indianapolis, Indiana. He attended Pike High School in Indianapolis and played on their Indiana 4A state championship winning team in 2003. He was also involved in the school's art program and had multiple sketches submitted to local museums. He starred for the Indy Hornets AAU team, winning several state championships and annually placing high at the AAU nationals.

Considered a three-star recruit by Rivals.com, Lee was listed as the No. 34 shooting guard in the nation in 2004. Traditional college basketball powerhouses were dissuaded from recruiting Lee due to concerns about his high school academics. However, in 2004 Lee was recruited by Western Kentucky coach Darrin Horn to play for the Hilltoppers.

== College career ==
In his first season, Lee set a WKU record for freshman scoring with 461 points in 31 games. He was named First Team All-Sun Belt Conference for three consecutive seasons (2005–06, 2006–07, 2007–08). As a senior at WKU, Lee was named Sun Belt Player of the Year. He also helped lead the Hilltoppers to a Sweet 16 appearance in the 2008 NCAA Tournament while being ranked 28th nationally in scoring with 20.4 points per game.

On January 27, 2008, Lee recorded a career high 33 points in a 77–68 win over Arkansas State.

Lee finished his collegiate career tied with Jim McDaniels for all-time leading scorer at WKU, with 2,238 points. During his four-year career at WKU, he started 127 games, played an overall 3,957 minutes, made 82% of free throws, made 245 three-point shots, had 242 steals, 281 assists and 78 blocked shots. On January 10, 2015, it was announced that Lee's jersey would be retired by the Hilltoppers.

Lee's tattoo on his arm reads "R.I.P. Danny Rumph" dedicated to his WKU teammate who died in May 2005 from an enlarged heart after hitting a game winning shot in a pick-up game in his hometown, Philadelphia.

== Professional career ==
=== Orlando Magic (2008–2009) ===
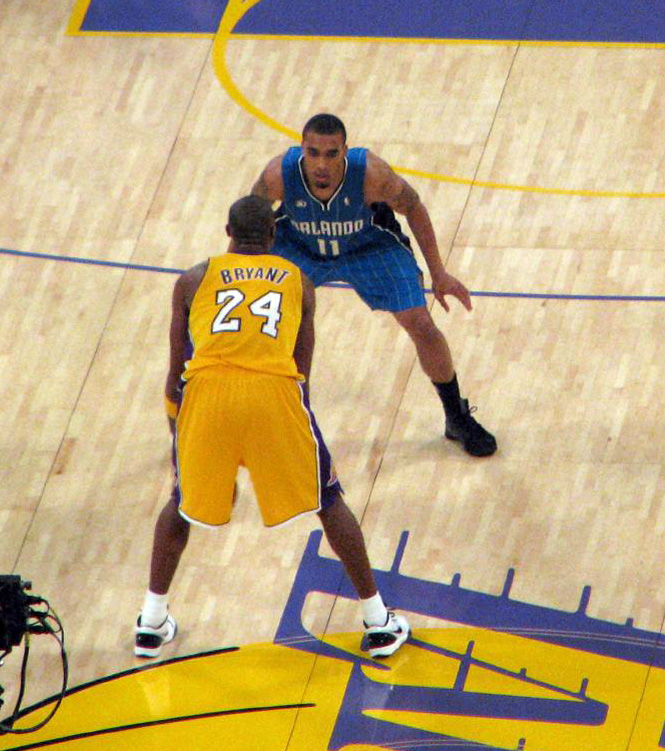
Lee defending Kobe Bryant in January 2009

Lee was drafted 22nd overall by the Orlando Magic in the 2008 NBA draft.

On February 4, 2009, Lee posted season-high numbers against the Los Angeles Clippers. He finished the night with 21 points, including 9-of-10 field goals while making three 3-pointers.

Then on March 23, 2009, in a game against the New York Knicks at Madison Square Garden, Lee set a then-career high with 22 points. He made two critical free throws late in the fourth quarter to secure a comeback win for the Magic. Lee finished 6–8 from the field, 2–3 from behind the three-point line, and 8–8 from the free throw line.

During the Magic's first round NBA playoff series against the Philadelphia 76ers, Lee scored 18 points in game 1 and a team-high 24 points in game 2, helping the team tie the series at 1–1.

On April 28, 2009, Lee was hit in the face by Dwight Howard during Game 5 of the Magic's first round playoff series, suffering a fractured sinus. The following day it was announced that he would miss Game 6 of the series due to the injury. He then returned for the second round matchup against the Boston Celtics but he was forced to wear a protective mask over his face for the remainder of the postseason.

In Game 2 of the 2009 NBA Finals, Lee missed a potential game-winning layup with 0.6 seconds remaining on the shot-clock at the end of regulation that would have evened the series at 1–1.

=== New Jersey Nets (2009–2010) ===
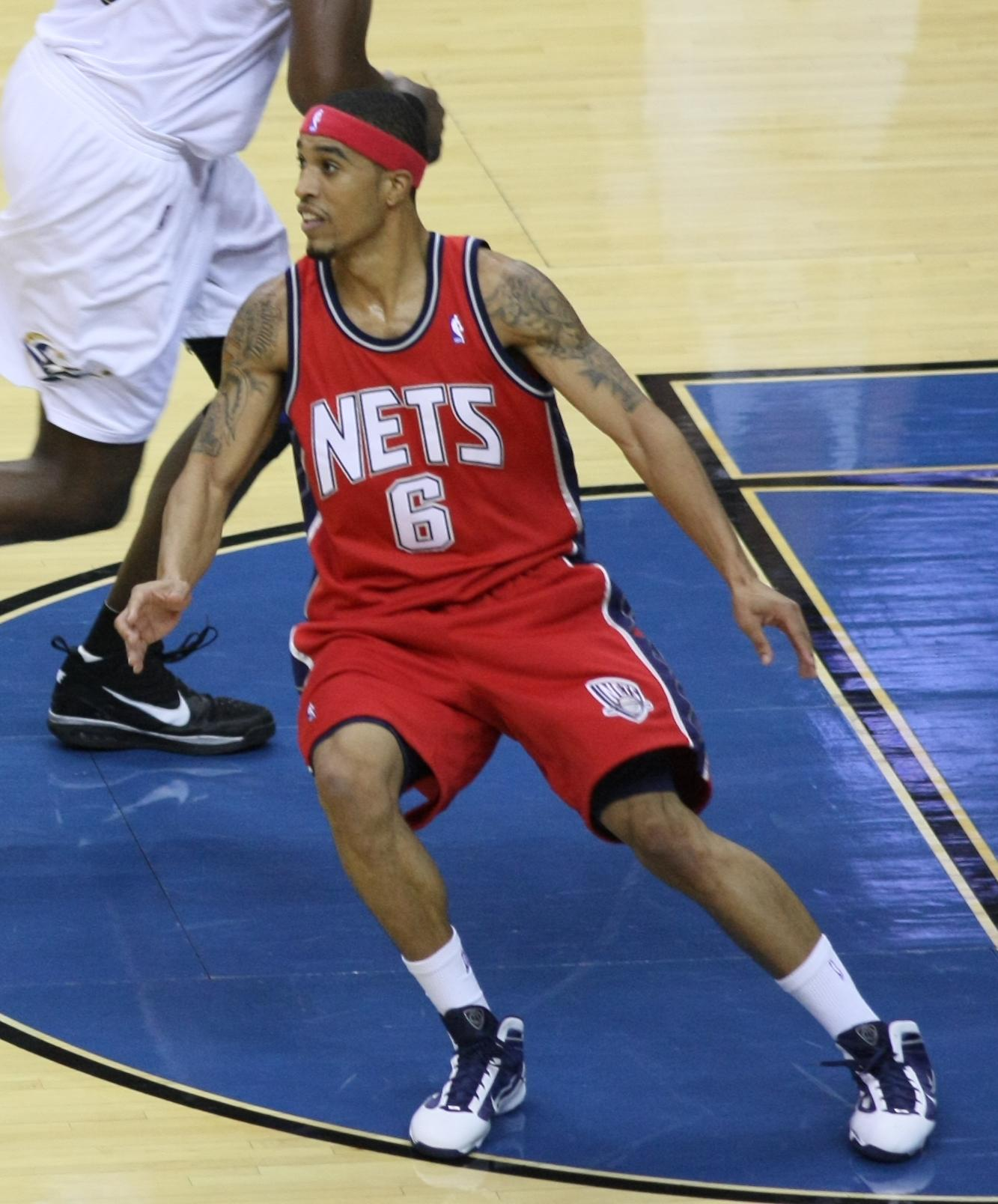
Lee with the Nets in October 2009

After spending his rookie year with the Orlando Magic, Lee was traded on June 25, 2009, along with Rafer Alston and Tony Battie, to the New Jersey Nets for future teammate Vince Carter and Ryan Anderson.

During the 2009–10 season, Lee led the Nets in steals (93), three-point shots made (76), and free throw percentage (86.9%).

On March 8, 2010, he recorded a career high 30 points in a 107–101 loss to the Memphis Grizzlies.

=== Houston Rockets (2010–2012) ===
On August 11, 2010, Lee was traded to the Houston Rockets in a four-team, five-player trade in which the Rockets sent Trevor Ariza to the New Orleans Hornets, the Indiana Pacers sent Troy Murphy to the Nets, and the Hornets sent James Posey and Darren Collison to the Pacers. He was officially introduced by the Rockets on August 18, 2010.

=== Boston Celtics (2012–2014) ===
On July 20, 2012, Lee was traded to the Boston Celtics in a three team sign and trade deal involving the Houston Rockets and Portland Trail Blazers. Lee agreed to a 4-year, $21.5 million deal with Boston. He had a fine start to the 2013–14 season hitting around 50 percent of his 3-point attempts under new coach Brad Stevens.

=== Memphis Grizzlies (2014–2016) ===
On January 7, 2014, a three-team trade was completed between the Celtics, the Memphis Grizzlies, and the Oklahoma City Thunder. Boston traded Lee and a 2016 second-round draft pick to Memphis for in exchange for the Grizzlies' Jerryd Bayless and the Thunder's Ryan Gomes. On January 14, Lee led Memphis to a 90–87 win over the Oklahoma City Thunder, with a season-high and team-leading 24 points, two of which were win-securing free throws to end the game.

=== Charlotte Hornets (2016) ===
On February 16, 2016, the Grizzlies traded Lee to the Charlotte Hornets in a three-team trade also involving the Miami Heat. Five days later, he made his debut and first start with the Hornets in a 104–96 win over the Brooklyn Nets, recording five points, one rebound and one assist in 21 minutes.

=== New York Knicks (2016–2019) ===
On July 8, 2016, Lee signed a 4-year, $48 million contract with the New York Knicks. Prior to the start of the 2017–18 season, Lee was named co-captain of the Knicks alongside Lance Thomas. On January 15, 2018, in a 119–104 win over the Brooklyn Nets, Lee made his 44th straight free throw on a third-quarter technical, tying the Knicks' record set by Chris Duhon in 2008–09. Lee came into the game leading the league at 96.1 percent after hitting 73 of 76. Two days later, he converted a free throw in the second quarter of the Knicks' 105–99 loss to the Memphis Grizzlies—his 45th straight, setting a franchise record. In December 2018, he played a game with the Knicks' NBA G League affiliate, the Westchester Knicks.

=== Dallas Mavericks (2019–2020) ===
On January 31, 2019, Lee was traded, along with Trey Burke, Tim Hardaway Jr. and Kristaps Porziņģis, to the Dallas Mavericks in exchange for DeAndre Jordan, Wesley Matthews, Dennis Smith Jr. and two future first-round draft picks. On June 22, 2020, the Dallas Mavericks announced that Lee suffered a left calf injury during the NBA hiatus. After becoming a free agent after the season, he was re-signed on December 11, 2020, but was waived after training camp. Lee retired on June 21, 2021.

== Career statistics ==
Legend
GP	Games played	GS	Games started	MPG	Minutes per game
FG%	Field goal percentage	3P%	3-point field goal percentage	FT%	Free throw percentage
RPG	Rebounds per game	APG	Assists per game	SPG	Steals per game
BPG	Blocks per game	PPG	Points per game	**Bold**	Career high

=== NBA ===
==== Regular season ====
Year	Team	GP	GS	MPG	FG%	3P%	FT%	RPG	APG	SPG	BPG	PPG
2008–09	Orlando	77	42	25.2	.450	.404	.830	2.3	1.2	1.0	.2	8.4
2009–10	New Jersey	71	66	**33.5**	.436	.338	.869	**3.5**	1.7	**1.3**	.3	**12.5**
2010–11	Houston	**81**	1	21.3	.439	.408	.792	2.6	1.2	.7	.2	8.3
2011–12	Houston	58	26	30.3	.433	.401	.826	2.7	1.5	1.2	**.4**	11.4
2012–13	Boston	78	39	24.9	.464	.372	.861	2.4	1.8	1.1	.3	7.8
2013–14	Boston	30	0	16.8	**.492**	.442	.818	1.6	1.1	.7	.3	7.4
2013–14	Memphis	49	47	30.0	.476	.345	.884	2.8	1.7	.9	**.4**	11.0
2014–15	Memphis	77	**74**	30.6	.448	.402	.860	2.3	2.0	1.0	.2	10.1
2015–16	Memphis	51	37	29.2	.458	.370	.826	2.3	1.5	1.0	.3	10.0
2015–16	Charlotte	28	28	30.2	.445	.392	.885	3.1	2.1	1.2	**.4**	8.9
2016–17	New York	77	**74**	31.9	.456	.401	.867	3.4	2.3	1.1	.3	10.8
2017–18	New York	76	69	30.4	.454	.406	**.919**	2.9	**2.4**	1.1	.2	12.0
2018–19	New York	12	2	13.3	.447	.313	.643	2.3	1.3	.7	.2	4.7
2018–19	Dallas	22	4	12.2	.390	.282	.714	1.2	1.0	.6	.0	3.6
2019–20	Dallas	24	9	14.4	.488	**.447**	.857	1.3	.5	.8	.3	4.5
Career		811	518	27.1	.451	.388	.853	2.6	1.7	1.0	.3	9.6

==== Playoffs ====
Year	Team	GP	GS	MPG	FG%	3P%	FT%	RPG	APG	SPG	BPG	PPG
2009	Orlando	**21**	**16**	26.2	.435	.273	.885	1.9	1.3	.9	.1	8.0
2013	Boston	4	0	9.8	.200	.000	**1.000**	.5	.3	.5	.0	1.5
2014	Memphis	7	7	32.0	.417	.316	.778	2.0	1.6	.7	.3	10.0
2015	Memphis	11	11	33.4	**.550**	**.467**	.957	2.5	**2.2**	**1.1**	.0	**13.3**
2016	Charlotte	7	7	**36.7**	.412	.444	.933	**2.9**	1.3	.9	**.4**	8.6
Career		50	41	28.7	.457	.346	.895	2.1	1.4	.9	.2	9.0

=== College ===
Year	Team	GP	GS	MPG	FG%	3P%	FT%	RPG	APG	SPG	BPG	PPG
2004–05	Western Kentucky	31	31	**33.2**	.450	.399	.722	5.2	2.0	1.8	.5	14.9
2005–06	Western Kentucky	30	30	31.1	.451	**.408**	**.847**	**6.3**	**2.9**	**2.6**	.3	17.4
2006–07	Western Kentucky	30	30	30.6	.472	.401	.840	4.6	1.9	1.5	**.8**	17.3
2007–08	Western Kentucky	**36**	**36**	30.0	**.477**	.397	.822	4.9	2.1	1.8	**.8**	**20.4**
Career		127	127	31.2	.464	.401	.817	5.2	2.2	1.9	.6	17.6
