= Fab Melo =

Brazilian basketball player (1990–2017)

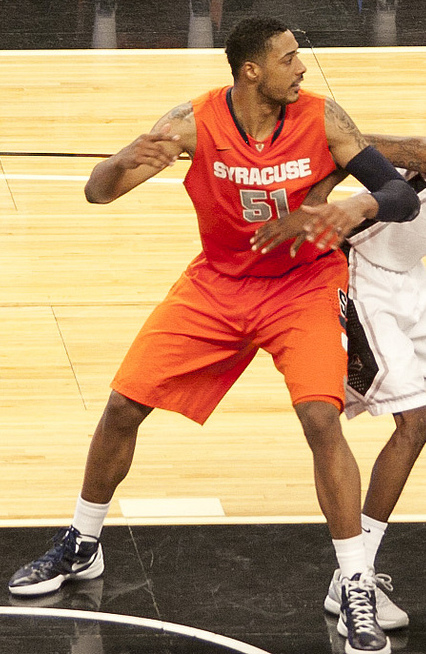
- Melo playing with Syracuse in 2012

Personal information
- Born: June 20, 1990 Juiz de Fora, Minas Gerais, Brazil
- Died: February 11, 2017 (aged 26) Juiz de Fora, Minas Gerais, Brazil
- Listed height: 7 ft 0 in (2.13 m)
- Listed weight: 255 lb (116 kg)

Career information
- High school: Sagemont (Weston, Florida)
- College: Syracuse (2010–2012)
- NBA draft: 2012: 1st round, 22nd overall pick
- Drafted by: Boston Celtics
- Playing career: 2012–2017
- Position: Center
- Number: 13

Career history
- 2012–2013: Boston Celtics
- 2012–2013: →Maine Red Claws
- 2014: Texas Legends
- 2015–2016: Liga Sorocabana
- 2016–2017: Brasília

Career highlights
- NBA D-League All-Rookie First Team (2013); NBA D-League All-Defensive First Team (2013); Big East Defensive Player of the Year (2012); Third-team Parade All-American (2010); McDonald's All-American (2010)
- Stats at NBA.com
- Stats at Basketball Reference

Fabricio Paulino de Melo ([faˈbɾisju pawˈlinu dʒi ˈmɛlu]; June 20, 1990 – February 11, 2017) was a Brazilian professional basketball player. He played one season in the National Basketball Association (NBA) for the Boston Celtics before returning to his home country and playing for Liga Sorocabana and Brasília of the Brazilian Novo Basquete Brasil (NBB). Prior to entering the NBA in 2012, he played two years of college basketball for Syracuse, where he was named the Big East Defensive Player of the Year as a sophomore.

== High school and college career ==
Melo arrived in the United States in 2008 and enrolled at Sagemont School in Weston, Florida. After graduating from Sagemont in 2010, Melo joined the Syracuse Orange men's basketball team. He spent two seasons playing for head coach Jim Boeheim at Syracuse and was part of the Orange team that went 34–3 overall and 17–1 in the Big East in 2012. Melo averaged 7.8 points, 5.8 rebounds and 2.9 blocks in the 2011–12 campaign. He was suspended twice during the season, once for three games during the regular season and again for the NCAA tournament due to academics. Melo's academic eligibility was also part of the NCAA investigation in which the Syracuse program self-imposed a postseason ban for the 2014–15 season. Melo claimed he was failing because he didn't understand English. Despite these issues, Melo was named the Big East Defensive Player of the Year.

In April 2012, Melo declared for the NBA draft, forgoing his final two years of college eligibility.

== Professional career ==
=== NBA ===
On June 28, 2012, Melo was selected by the Boston Celtics with the 22nd overall pick in the first round of the 2012 NBA draft. On July 3, 2012, he signed his rookie scale contract with the Celtics. He played six games in the NBA for Boston during the 2012–13 campaign, but mostly spent the year in the NBA Development League with the Maine Red Claws. On December 22, 2012, in Maine's 85–78 loss to the Erie BayHawks, Melo recorded a triple-double and set a new NBA Development League record for blocked shots in a game with 14; he also had 15 points and 16 rebounds to register just the third triple-double in team history. At the end of the season, he was named to the NBA D-League All-Defensive First Team and All-Rookie First Team.

On August 15, 2013, Melo was traded to the Memphis Grizzlies in exchange for Donté Greene. He was later waived by the Grizzlies on August 30, 2013. On September 10, 2013, Melo signed with the Dallas Mavericks, but he was ultimately waived on October 22.

On January 22, 2014, Melo was acquired by the Texas Legends of the NBA Development League.

=== Brazil ===
On August 1, 2014, Melo signed with Brazilian team Club Athletico Paulistano of the NBB. However, he never appeared in a game for Paulistano. On April 7, 2015, he signed with Caciques de Humacao in Puerto Rico, but soon left before appearing in a game for the team.

In November 2015, Melo signed with Liga Sorocabana for the remainder of the 2015–16 season. In June 2016, he signed with Brasília. He played in six games for Brasília during the Liga Sudamericana de Básquetbol and appeared in one regular season game on November 30, 2016.

== Death ==
Melo died on February 11, 2017, at the age of 26. He was pronounced dead at home in Juiz de Fora, Minas Gerais, Brazil; sources state that he went to sleep and was discovered dead the following morning by his mother. It was later discovered after an autopsy report that he had suffered a heart attack.

== Career statistics ==
Legend
GP	Games played	GS	Games started	MPG	Minutes per game
FG%	Field goal percentage	3P%	3-point field goal percentage	FT%	Free throw percentage
RPG	Rebounds per game	APG	Assists per game	SPG	Steals per game
BPG	Blocks per game	PPG	Points per game	**Bold**	Career high

=== College ===
Year	Team	GP	GS	MPG	FG%	3P%	FT%	RPG	APG	SPG	BPG	PPG
2010–11	Syracuse	**33**	24	9.9	**.607**	–	.360	1.9	.2	.3	.8	2.3
2011–12	Syracuse	30	**30**	**25.4**	.566	–	**.633**	**5.8**	**.7**	**.5**	**2.9**	**7.8**
Career		63	54	17.3	.576	–	.553	3.8	.5	.4	1.8	4.9

=== NBA ===
==== Regular season ====
Year	Team	GP	GS	MPG	FG%	3P%	FT%	RPG	APG	SPG	BPG	PPG
2012–13	Boston	6	0	6.0	.500	.000	.250	.5	.0	.3	.3	1.2
Career		6	0	6.0	.500	.000	.250	.5	.0	.3	.3	1.2

== See also ==
- List of basketball players who died during their careers
