= Terrence Williams =

American basketball player (born 1987)

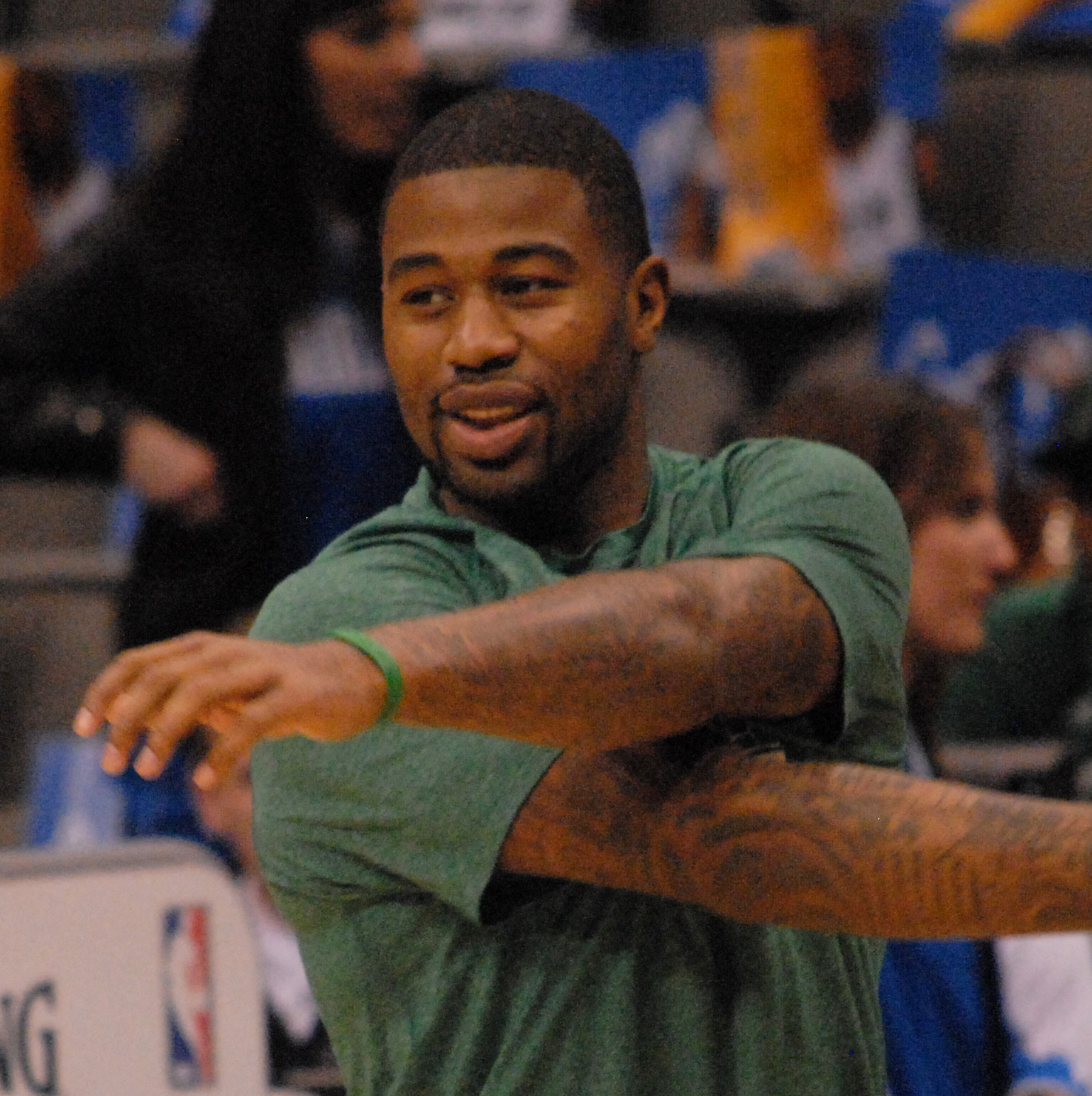
- Williams with the Boston Celtics in 2013

Personal information
- Born: June 28, 1987 (age 39) Seattle, Washington, U.S.
- Listed height: 6 ft 6 in (1.98 m)
- Listed weight: 220 lb (100 kg)

Career information
- High school: Rainier Beach (Seattle, Washington)
- College: Louisville (2005–2009)
- NBA draft: 2009: 1st round, 11th overall pick
- Drafted by: New Jersey Nets
- Playing career: 2009–2015
- Position: Shooting guard / small forward
- Number: 8, 1, 55

Career history
- 2009–2010: New Jersey Nets
- 2010: →Springfield Armor
- 2010–2012: Houston Rockets
- 2012: Sacramento Kings
- 2012–2013: Guangdong Southern Tigers
- 2013: Boston Celtics
- 2013: Türk Telekom
- 2014: Los Angeles D-Fenders
- 2014: Brujos de Guayama
- 2014: Meralco Bolts
- 2014: Soles de Santo Domingo
- 2014: Reales de La Vega
- 2014: Fuerza Regia
- 2015: Vaqueros de Bayamón
- 2015: Guaiqueríes de Margarita

Career highlights
- All-NBA D-League Third Team (2014); Third-team All-American – AP, NABC (2009); First-team All-Big East (2009); 2× Second-team All-Big East (2007, 2008)
- Stats at NBA.com
- Stats at Basketball Reference

Terrence Deshon Williams (born June 28, 1987) is an American former professional basketball player. Williams was drafted 11th overall in the 2009 NBA draft by the New Jersey Nets. He was the senior co-captain for the 2008–09 University of Louisville Cardinals.

== Early career ==
At Rainier Beach High School, Williams was a four-year starter on the basketball team. He helped the team to a state title in 2003. He averaged 21.7 points his senior year. He was also a starting wide receiver and free safety on the football team. He considered attending Indiana and Kansas before deciding to play for the University of Louisville Cardinals.

In the 2007–08 University of Louisville season, Williams achieved the third and fourth triple-doubles in Louisville basketball history (the first two by Samaki Walker and Ellis Myles). He racked up 14 points, 13 assists and 12 rebounds in the Cardinals' season-opening 104–69 win over Hartford and had 10 points, 10 rebounds, and 10 assists in a January 19, 2008 loss to Seton Hall.

Williams appeared on three straight Sports Illustrated covers and is one of few athletes to do so. He was also a finalist in the Lowe's Senior Class Award and was named to the Lowe's Senior Class All-Senior All-America first team.

Williams had extraordinary overall athletic abilities as recognized by his college coach Rick Pitino. "He's a freakish athlete", Pitino said. He is known for his slam dunking abilities and won the dunk contest at the 2005 Kentucky Derby Basketball Classic.

== Professional career ==
=== New Jersey Nets (2009–2010) ===
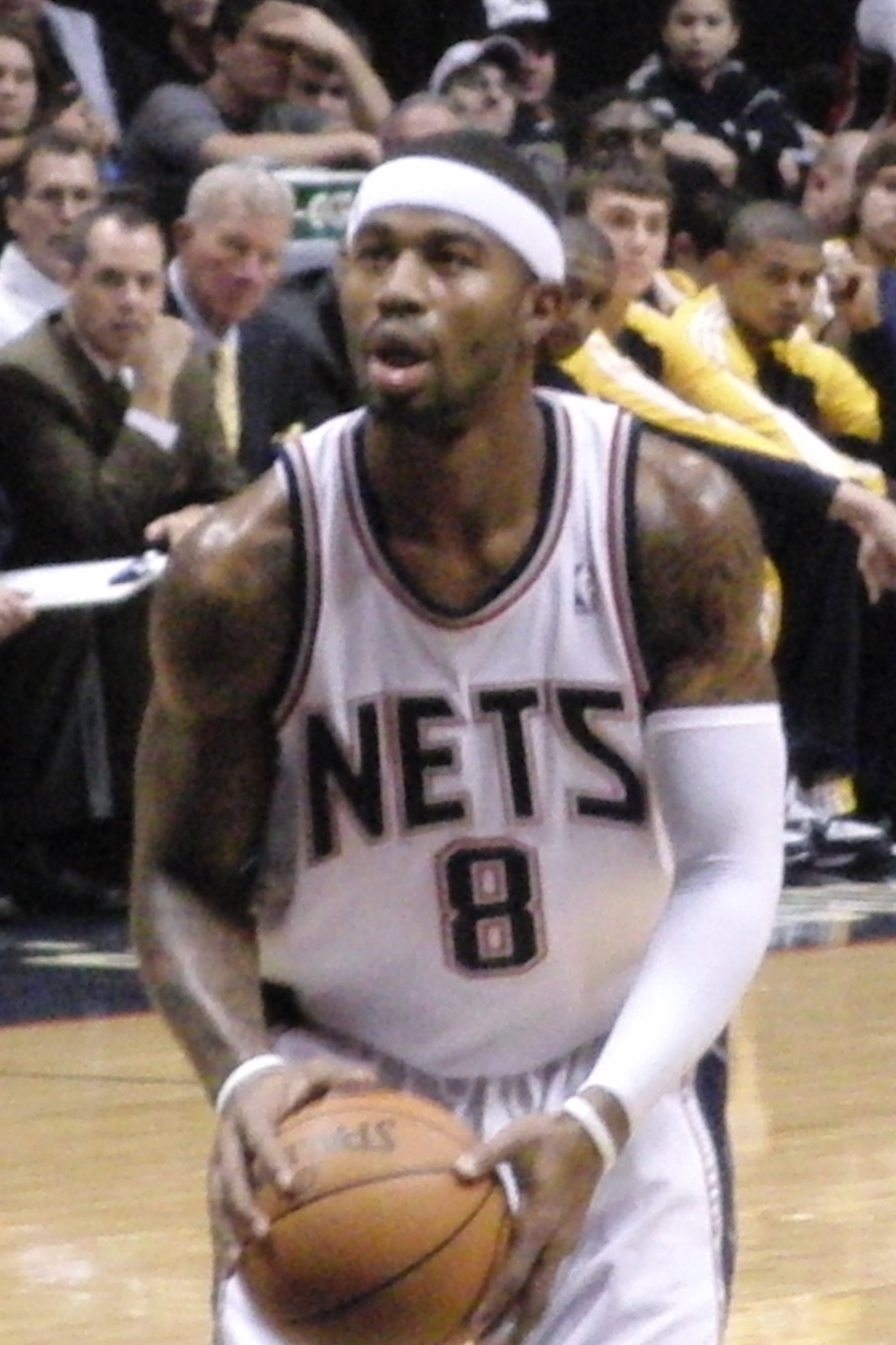
Williams with the Nets

Williams was drafted by the New Jersey Nets with the 11th overall pick in the 2009 NBA draft and was signed to a four-year contract. He saw playing time early in his rookie season but was relegated to a lesser role as a result of poor behavior; he was late for meetings, missed a team bus and slept in through a shoot-around. His playing time increased after an injury to Devin Harris and a meeting with the team president, Rod Thorn, and interim coach, Kiki VanDeWeghe. On April 9, 2010, Williams recorded a triple-double with a career-high 27 points, 13 rebounds and 10 assists in a double overtime 127–116 win over the Chicago Bulls. It was the first triple-double by a Nets rookie since 2001.

Williams continued to violate team policy during the beginning of his sophomore season. Fines issued by the Nets failed to deter Williams from his past transgressions of being late to practices and team meetings. On November 26, 2010, he was assigned to the Springfield Armor of the NBA D-League. Nets head coach Avery Johnson denied that the assignment was due to disciplinary reasons but instead because the team did not have enough minutes for Williams. He was recalled on December 7, 2010.

=== Houston Rockets (2010–2012) ===
On December 15, 2010, Williams was traded to the Houston Rockets in a three-team trade involving the Nets and Los Angeles Lakers. He averaged 4.5 points and 2.3 rebounds in 12 games played for Rockets. On March 16, 2012, Williams was waived by the Rockets.

In a 2014 interview, Daryl Morey called the loss of a first-round pick for Williams one of his worst moves as a general manager.

=== Sacramento Kings (2012) ===
After being waived by the Rockets, Williams signed a 10-day contract with the Sacramento Kings on March 21, 2012. He was signed for the remainder of the season on March 31, 2012.

=== Guangdong Southern Tigers (2012–2013) ===
In October 2012, Williams joined the Detroit Pistons for their training camp. On October 22, 2012, Williams was waived by the Detroit Pistons.

In November 2012, he joined the Guangdong Southern Tigers of China. He left the Tigers in February 2013.

=== Boston Celtics (2013) ===
On February 20, 2013, Williams signed a 10-day contract with the Boston Celtics. On March 3, 2013, Williams re-signed to a multi-year contract with the Celtics. His appearance on May 3, 2013, in the Celtics’ Game 6 first round playoff loss to the New York Knicks would be his final appearance in the NBA. On June 30, 2013, he was waived by the Celtics.

=== Türk Telekom (2013) ===
In October 2013, Williams signed with Türk Telekom. He parted ways with them on November 14, after playing only two games in Turkish Basketball League.

=== Los Angeles D-Fenders (2013–2014) ===
On December 31, 2013, Williams was acquired by the Los Angeles D-Fenders. He set the D-Fenders franchise single-game scoring record with 50 points on January 31, 2014, against the Idaho Stampede, surpassing 49 earlier that season by Manny Harris.

=== Brujos de Guayama (2014) ===
In April 2014, Williams signed with Brujos de Guayama of Puerto Rico. He was waived on May 1, 2014.

=== Meralco Bolts (2014) ===
On May 18, 2014, Williams signed with Meralco Bolts, but left seven days later after just three games.

=== Soles de Santo Domingo (2014) ===
Williams joined Soles de Santo Domingo of the Dominican Republic in 2014.

=== Reales de La Vega (2014) ===
Williams joined Reales de La Vega of the Dominican Republic in 2014.

=== Fuerza Regia (2014–2015) ===
On December 26, 2014, WIlliams signed with Fuerza Regia of Mexico. In his first game, he scored 19 points in the game that Fuerza Regia won 101–85 against Gigantes Estado de Mexico. Williams also grabbed 2 rebounds and has 6 assists.

=== Vaqueros de Bayamón (2015) ===
On January 17, 2015, Williams signed with Maccabi Ashdod of Israel. Ten days later, he left the club before playing in a single game for them. In March 2015, he signed with Vaqueros de Bayamón of Puerto Rico. He was released by the club after appearing in just two league games.

=== Guaiqueríes de Margarita (2015) ===
In April 2015, Williams signed with Guaiqueríes de Margarita of Venezuela for the rest of the 2015 LPB season.

On October 6, 2015, Williams signed with the upcoming AmeriLeague to play on the following season. However, the league folded after it was discovered the founder was a con artist.

== NBA career statistics ==
Legend
GP	Games played	GS	Games started	MPG	Minutes per game
FG%	Field goal percentage	3P%	3-point field goal percentage	FT%	Free throw percentage
RPG	Rebounds per game	APG	Assists per game	SPG	Steals per game
BPG	Blocks per game	PPG	Points per game	**Bold**	Career high

=== Regular season ===
Year	Team	GP	GS	MPG	FG%	3P%	FT%	RPG	APG	SPG	BPG	PPG
2009–10	New Jersey	**78**	**9**	**22.6**	.401	.310	.715	**4.5**	2.9	.6	.1	8.4
2010–11	New Jersey	10	0	20.6	.397	.333	.500	3.6	**3.1**	.5	.0	6.7
2010–11	Houston	11	0	7.6	.333	.200	**.818**	1.4	.6	.4	.0	3.5
2011–12	Houston	12	0	15.1	.351	**.421**	.500	2.4	.8	.3	.1	4.5
2011–12	Sacramento	18	0	20.5	.461	.296	.618	4.1	**3.1**	**.9**	**.3**	**8.8**
2012–13	Boston	24	0	13.3	**.495**	.333	.429	1.8	1.6	.5	.1	4.6
Career		153	9	19.1	.412	.317	.659	3.6	2.4	.5	.1	7.1

=== Playoffs ===
Year	Team	GP	GS	MPG	FG%	3P%	FT%	RPG	APG	SPG	BPG	PPG
2013	Boston	5	0	9.6	.200	.000	.500	2.0	1.2	.0	.2	1.0
Career		5	0	9.6	.200	.000	.500	2.0	1.2	.0	.2	1.0

== Personal life ==
Williams has estimated that he owns over 300 pairs of sneakers. His nickname is "T-Will".

== Criminal charges ==
On October 7, 2021, the U.S. Attorney for the Southern District of New York, Audrey Strauss, criminally charged Williams and 15 others in connection with an alleged scheme to defraud the NBA's health plan, in which nearly $4 million in fraudulent claims appeared to have been made. Strauss referred to Williams as the leader of the conspiracy. The charges alleged that Williams obtained fraudulent medical and dental invoices, sent them to his co-conspirators, including other former NBA players, and claims were submitted by the aforementioned co-conspirators to the plan, which paid "most" claims for medical care never rendered. Nineteen people were charged in the indictment on counts of conspiracy to commit health care fraud and wire fraud.

On August 3, 2023, Williams was sentenced to 10 years in prison for his role in the scheme.

== See also ==
- 2009 NCAA Men's Basketball All-Americans
