= Jovo Stanojević =

Serbian basketball player

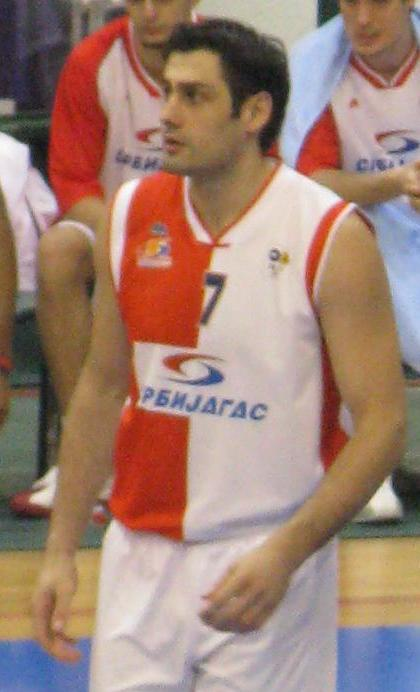
- Stanojević with Vojvodina Srbijagas in 2009

t
- Title: Center

Personal information
- Born: 27 September 1977 (age 49) Sombor, SR Serbia, SFR Yugoslavia
- Listed height: 2.07 m (6 ft 9 in)
- Listed weight: 110 kg (243 lb)

Career information
- NBA draft: 1999: undrafted
- Playing career: 1993–2013, 2019–2020
- Position: Center
- Number: 7, 9, 12

Career history
- 1993–1996: Vojvodina
- 1996–2000: Crvena zvezda
- 2000–2001: Maccabi Ra'anana
- 2001–2002: Partizan
- 2002–2007: Alba Berlin
- 2007: Mega Aqua Monta
- 2007–2008: Prokom Trefl Sopot
- 2008: Beşiktaş Cola Turka
- 2008–2009: Kyiv
- 2009: Vojvodina Srbijagas
- 2009–2010: Kepez Belediyesi
- 2010: Al Kuwait
- 2010–2012: Pınar Karşıyaka
- 2012–2013: TED Ankara Kolejliler
- 2019–2020: I Came to Play

Career highlights
- 2× YUBA League champion (1998, 2002); Yugoslav Cup winner (2002); YUBA League MVP (2002); 2x All-Bundesliga Team (2005, 2006); 2× Bundesliga MVP (2003, 2006); Bundesliga champion (2003); 2× German Cup winner (2003, 2006); Polish League champion (2008); Polish Cup winner (2008); 2× Nike Hoop Summit (1995–1996)
Medals
Men's basketball
Representing FR Yugoslavia
Universiade
Gold medal – first place	2001 Beijing	Team competition
'22 & under' European Championship
Gold medal – first place	1998 Italy	Team
Bronze medal – third place	1996 Turkey	Team
'22 & under' World Championship
Bronze medal – third place	1997 Australia	Team
Mediterranean Games
Bronze medal – third place	1997 Bari	Team competition

Jovan "Jovo" Stanojević (Cyrillic: Јово Станојевић; born 27 September 1977) is a Serbian former professional basketball player.

== Professional career ==
Stanojević began his professional career at the age of 16, playing with Vojvodina in the Yugoslav Basketball League. As one of the most promising players of his generation, Stanojević participated twice at the Nike Hoop Summit in 1995 and 1996.

Throughout his career, Stanojević played abroad in several countries, including five seasons in Germany with Alba Berlin, from 2002 to 2007. He also spent few years in Turkey, playing with Beşiktaş Cola Turka, Kepez Belediyesi, Pınar Karşıyaka and TED Ankara Kolejliler. In August 2013, he decided to retire.

In September 2019, Stanojević joined I Came to Play of the amateur fourth-tier Serbian League.

== Yugoslav national team ==
Stanojević won a gold medal at the 2001 Summer Universiade in Beijing.
