= Darko Miličić =

Serbian basketball player (born 1985)

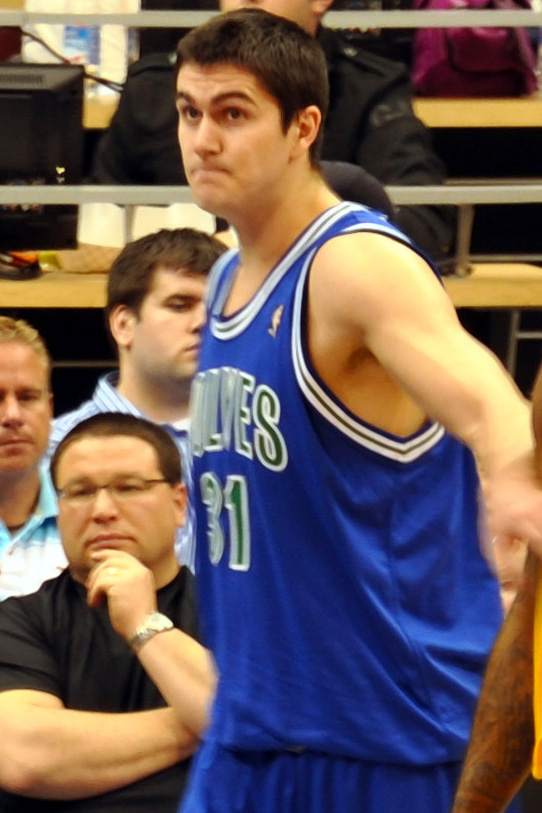
- Miličić with the Timberwolves.

Personal information
- Born: 20 June 1985 (age 41) Novi Sad, SR Serbia, SFR Yugoslavia
- Listed height: 213 cm (7 ft 0 in)
- Listed weight: 113 kg (249 lb)

Career information
- NBA draft: 2003: 1st round, 2nd overall pick
- Drafted by: Detroit Pistons
- Playing career: 2001–2012, 2019–2020
- Position: Center
- Number: 13, 31, 99, 26

Career history
- 2001–2003: Hemofarm
- 2003–2006: Detroit Pistons
- 2006–2007: Orlando Magic
- 2007–2009: Memphis Grizzlies
- 2009–2010: New York Knicks
- 2010–2012: Minnesota Timberwolves
- 2012: Boston Celtics
- 2019–2020: Košarkaški klub I Came to Play

Career highlights
- NBA champion (2004)

Career NBA statistics
- Points: 2,813 (6.0 ppg)
- Rebounds: 1,971 (4.2 rpg)
- Blocks: 613 (1.3 bpg)
- Stats at NBA.com
- Stats at Basketball Reference
Medals
Men's basketball
Representing Yugoslavia
European Championship for Cadets
Gold medal – first place	2001 Latvia	U16 Team

Darko Miličić (Serbian Cyrillic: Дарко Миличић, Serbian pronunciation: [ˈdarko ˈmilit͡ʃit͡ɕ]; born 20 June 1985) is a Serbian former professional basketball player. He is 2.13 m (7 ft 0 in), and played the center position. He played in the National Basketball Association (NBA) from 2003 to 2012. Nicknamed "the Human Victory Cigar" for only playing in blowout wins or losses, Miličić is the fifth youngest player and the youngest foreign player to have played in the NBA, the youngest player to have played in an NBA Finals game, and the youngest player to win the NBA championship.

Miličić was selected by the Detroit Pistons as the second overall pick in the 2003 NBA draft; he was chosen after number one pick LeBron James and ahead of other future NBA superstars including Carmelo Anthony, Chris Bosh, and Dwyane Wade. Selected with a high draft pick, Miličić never played at the level expected of him in the NBA and is widely considered a draft bust. While he won an NBA championship with the Pistons in 2004, Miličić never received significant playing time with the team and was traded to the Orlando Magic in 2006. Following stints with the Magic, Memphis Grizzlies, and New York Knicks, Miličić was traded to the Minnesota Timberwolves in 2010 and signed a four-year contract with the team that summer. After being released by Minnesota in 2012, he played one regular-season game for the Boston Celtics later that year before being released. Miličić announced his retirement from the NBA in 2013; he retired with career averages of 6.0 points and 4.2 rebounds per game.

In international play, Miličić played for the Serbian national team.

== Early life ==
Miličić's parents are Milorad and Zora. During the Yugoslav Wars, when Miličić was not yet 10, he heard a news report in which his father was named as one of several Serbian soldiers killed in action; however, a few minutes later, the newscaster indicated some of the soldiers, including his father, had been incorrectly included as killed. His father ultimately survived the wars. His parents' families hail from Janj near Šipovo in Bosanska Krajina. His sister, Tijana, is a volleyball player.

Miličić played his first youth basketball in BFC Beočin until the NATO bombing of Yugoslavia that lasted from 24 March to 10 June 1999, when he was forced to take a break. After that, Miličić played for the basketball club Sports World from Novi Sad, which is also a basketball school, where he became a dominant figure and received interest from bigger teams. He played club basketball with his friend Nemanja Jokić, the older brother of Nikola Jokić.

At age 14, Miličić started playing basketball with the Serbian team Hemofarm's junior team. He was later called up from the junior team before being drafted by the NBA's Detroit Pistons in 2003.

== NBA career ==
=== Detroit Pistons (2003–2006) ===
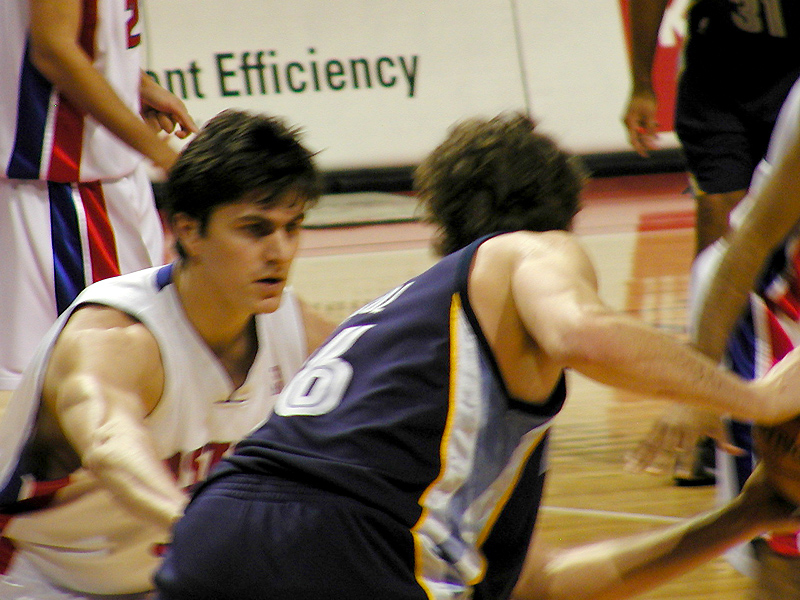
Miličić (left) in 2006

The Detroit Pistons chose Miličić with the second overall pick in the 2003 NBA draft. Unlike most teams with high draft choices, the Pistons were a good team that had made the Eastern Conference Finals the season before they drafted Miličić. The NBA draft rules had to be changed to allow Miličić to be drafted. The Pistons held the second overall draft pick because of a 1997 trade that had sent Otis Thorpe to the Vancouver Grizzlies. Miličić saw limited playing time during his first season with the Pistons, but became the youngest player to appear in an NBA Finals game (18 years and 356 days) and won an NBA championship five days later when the Pistons defeated the Los Angeles Lakers in the 2004 NBA Finals. During Game 5, Miličić broke his right hand after Brian Cook committed a shooting foul, resulting in him requiring surgery that sidelined him from the Pistons for eight weeks.

Pistons team president Joe Dumars repeatedly stated that Miličić would play a big part in the team's future, but he did not see a large increase in playing time during his second season. However, on April 19, 2005, Miličić had his best game as a Piston, playing 30 minutes as a starter and recording 16 points, five rebounds, and three blocks. This was one of two games Miličić started in Detroit, with the other being the next game after where he played 30 minutes while recording nine points, three rebounds, and a block. Miličić never saw this amount of playing time as a Piston again and has been quoted on numerous occasions as attributing his slow development on his lack of playing time: "I've said it 10,000 times, the best way for me to improve is to play. All the work in practice and individual workouts can only help me so much".

After Larry Brown's departure, Flip Saunders was hired as head coach of the Pistons. Under Saunders, Miličić still averaged only 5.6 minutes per game, and received significant playing time only in blowout wins or blowout losses for the Pistons. Miličić's lack of playing time in Detroit was frequently highlighted in publications. In the 96 games he played as a Piston, he only scored a total of 152 points and averaged 1.6 points and 5.8 minutes per game.

=== Orlando Magic (2006–2007) ===
On 15 February 2006, just prior to the NBA's All-Star weekend, Miličić was traded, along with point guard Carlos Arroyo, to the Orlando Magic for Kelvin Cato and a first-round pick in the 2007 NBA draft (Rodney Stuckey).

During a game against the New York Knicks, Miličić played 32 minutes and finished with 13 points and seven rebounds, which were season highs for him, while leading the Magic in minutes for that game. Miličić averaged 2.4 blocks per game in his first 20 games as a member of the Magic. In round 1 of the 2007 playoffs, Orlando faced off against Miličić's old team, the Detroit Pistons, who swept Orlando in four games. During the series, Miličić increased his scoring to 12.3 on 58.8% shooting. When his rookie contract expired in the 2007 offseason, Orlando made him a qualifying offer, but the team withdrew that offer on 3 July 2007 and made Miličić an unrestricted free agent.

=== Memphis Grizzlies (2007–2009) ===
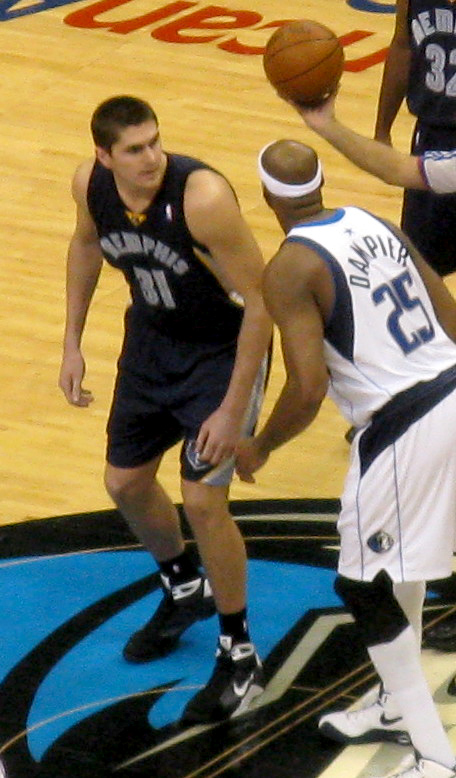
Miličić (left) in 2008

On 12 July 2007, the first day of free agency, Miličić was signed by the Memphis Grizzlies to a three-year, $21 million contract. He hurt his Achilles tendon practicing with the Serbian national team in the 2008 offseason but was available to start at the beginning of the season. Miličić began the 2008–09 season starting at power forward, but was moved to the bench due to poor play. He regained his starting job as his play steadily improved in early December 2008. Miličić's progress was set back by an injury on 26 December 2008, against the Indiana Pacers when he broke a knuckle on his right hand during the game.

Miličić's time with the Grizzlies was one of the low points of his career; he did not want to play for the team, he suffered an injury, and the team was not performing well. Miličić's wife would recall that he would punch the walls of his house in anger after coming home from games. During a game against the Houston Rockets in early December 2008, he even deliberately ripped his jersey in frustration (the jersey was later autographed by him and sold at an auction).

=== New York Knicks (2009–2010) ===
On 25 June 2009, Miličić was traded to the New York Knicks for Quentin Richardson and cash considerations. On 17 December, Miličić said that he planned to leave the NBA and return to playing basketball in Europe the following season. In the eight games he played for the Knicks, Miličić averaged 2.0 points, 2.3 rebounds, and 0.5 assists.

=== Minnesota Timberwolves (2010–2012) ===
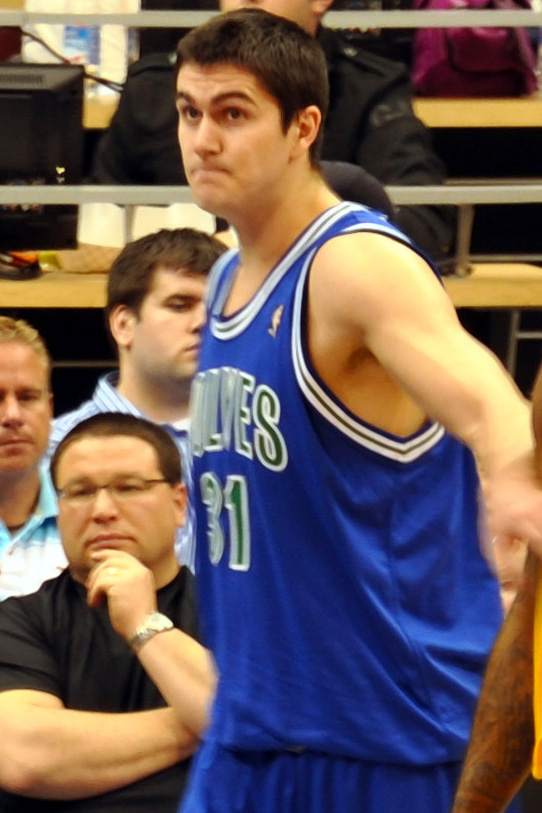
Miličić in April 2010

On 17 February 2010, Miličić was traded to the Minnesota Timberwolves along with cash considerations for Brian Cardinal. The Timberwolves agreed to re-sign Miličić for four years and $20 million on 1 July. David Kahn said that Darko was "like manna from heaven."

The 2010–11 Minnesota season was Miličić's best statistically; in interviews, he looked back on that time period fondly relative to the rest of his time in the NBA. He averaged 8.8 points, 5.2 rebounds, and 2.0 blocks per game, finishing the season fifth in the league in blocks per game. Miličić had his best games on 19 November, when he scored 23 points, 16 rebounds and six blocks against the Los Angeles Lakers; and on 14 December, when he had a career-high 25 points and 11 rebounds against the Golden State Warriors.

Miličić began the 2011-12 season as the Timberwolves' starting center. On 20 January 2012, he scored a season-high 22 points and seven rebounds against the Los Angeles Clippers. However, he would see his playing time diminish as the season went on. On 12 July, Miličić was waived by the Timberwolves under the league's amnesty clause.

=== Boston Celtics (2012) ===
In September 2012, Miličić signed with the Boston Celtics. In October 2012, during the Celtics preseason exhibition games in Europe, Miličić averaged 2.0 points, 7.5 rebounds, and 3.0 blocks per game, with Celtics head coach Doc Rivers stating that Miličić could become a starter in order to rest Kevin Garnett early. During the NBA preseason, Miličić played one game against the Philadelphia 76ers on 15 October, where he recorded six points, three rebounds, and a block in seven minutes before injuring his wrist. On 21 November 2012, the Celtics released Miličić at his request so that he could attend to personal matters. Miličić's final game ever was on 2 November, a 99–88 loss to the Milwaukee Bucks where he recorded a rebound, two turnovers, and a foul. This was the Celtic's second game of the regular season, and it was the fourth game that Miličić played during the entire season, playing only five minutes for that game.

=== Retirement ===
In June 2013, Miličić announced that he had retired from the NBA. He retired with career averages of 6.0 points and 4.2 rebounds per game. In September 2014, it was revealed that Miličić had retired from professional basketball in order to pursue a kickboxing career.

=== Legacy ===
As of February 2023, Miličić is the fifth youngest player to have played in the NBA, the youngest foreign player to have played in the NBA, the youngest player to have played in an NBA Finals game, and the youngest NBA champion. After having been selected with the second overall pick in the 2003 NBA Draft, Miličić failed to play at the level expected of him in the NBA and is known as one of the worst draft choices in the history of the NBA. Miličić himself has questioned whether the Pistons made the right move by drafting him. The Pistons passed over future NBA stars Carmelo Anthony, Chris Bosh, and Dwyane Wade to select Miličić. In June 2011, Mark David Smith of Bleacher Report wrote, "The Pistons missed a huge opportunity when they picked Darko. Carmelo, Wade or Bosh could've helped put Detroit over the hump after the 2004 championship season. The thought of one of these superstars with that Pistons team is scary; it could've potentially made them one of the best dynasties in all of sports history".

== National team career ==
Miličić played for the FR Yugoslavia U16 national team that won a gold medal at the European Cadet Championships in 2001.

In 2006, Miličić led Serbia and Montenegro at the 2006 FIBA World Championship. Serbia and Montenegro had decided to replace their aging superstars—who had led the team to a gold medal finish in the previous 2002 FIBA World Championship—with young blood. Miličić led the team in rebounds (56) and blocked shots (17) and was second on the team in scoring (16.2 ppg) and assists (11) through six games. In Serbia and Montenegro's sixth and final game against Spain, Miličić matched up against NBA All-Star Pau Gasol and finished with 18 points, 15 rebounds, and three blocks.

During an interview following a 68–67 overtime loss to Greece at EuroBasket 2007, Miličić made vulgar remarks to the media in his native language. He referred to the referees with expletives and threatened to engage in various sex acts with their female relatives. He received a $13,770 fine from FIBA and his outburst was heavily criticized by Memphis Grizzlies general manager Chris Wallace and head coach Marc Iavaroni.

== Post-NBA activities ==
=== Kickboxing career ===
Miličić had a stint in kickboxing during 2014. On 18 December 2014, he had his official debut in kickboxing under the WAKO rules in his hometown Novi Sad. Miličić lost that fight by second round TKO from Serbian kickboxer Radovan Radojčin from Senta, Serbia.

=== Professional basketball return attempt ===
On 19 May 2015, it was announced that Miličić had agreed to come back from retirement and start playing professional basketball again with Metalac Farmakom of the Basketball League of Serbia and the ABA League after the season was over. The announcement was made by Boško Đukanović, the club's president, and later confirmed by Miličić himself. However, Miličić later changed his mind.

=== Farming ===
Miličić works as a farmer in his native Serbia. As of August 2017, Miličić owned and operated an apple orchard of about 125 acres (51 ha), with plans to purchase more land and also grow cherries.

=== Amateur basketball career ===
In September 2019, Miličić joined I Came to Play in his hometown of Novi Sad. He debuted with the team on 6 October in a 78–50 victory against KK Futog, scoring two points and handing out several assists before leaving the game with a minor shoulder injury.

== Personal life ==
On 23 May 2009, Miličić married Zorana Markuš. They have a daughter (b. 2009) and two sons (b. 2010 & b. 2012). His wife is a fashion designer and the sister of deceased Serbian criminal Marko Markuš.

In 2010, Miličić paid for a trip and treatment in China for five Serbian children with Batten disease. In April 2011, inspired by the actions of former NBA player Ron Artest, Miličić auctioned up his 2003–04 championship ring, his championship belt gifted to him by Rasheed Wallace, raffle tickets, and an all-expenses paid trip to an NBA Finals game to raise money for children with Batten disease.

Miličić is a supporter of the Ravna Gora movement, and has tattoos of World War II Chetnik leaders Nikola Kalabić and Momčilo Đujić on his stomach, and Draža Mihailović and Brane Bogunović on his back. In late 2013, Miličić expressed his support for far-right politician Vojislav Šešelj. In 2024, Miličić endorsed the ruling Serbian Progressive Party.

A folk song was made in his honour by the Bosnian Serb duo Žare i Goci. In March 2024, Miličić stated that he is a fan of KK Crvena Zvezda and is a member of the Assembly for KK Crvena Zvezda on the Jao Mile podcast.

== Career statistics ==
Legend
GP	Games played	GS	Games started	MPG	Minutes per game
FG%	Field goal percentage	3P%	3-point field goal percentage	FT%	Free throw percentage
RPG	Rebounds per game	APG	Assists per game	SPG	Steals per game
BPG	Blocks per game	PPG	Points per game	**Bold**	Career high
†	Won an NBA championship

=== Regular season ===
Year	Team	GP	GS	MPG	FG%	3P%	FT%	RPG	APG	SPG	BPG	PPG
2003–04†	Detroit	34	0	4.7	.262	.000	.583	1.3	.2	.2	.4	1.4
2004–05	Detroit	37	2	6.9	.329	—	**.708**	1.2	.2	.1	.5	1.8
2005–06	Detroit	25	0	5.6	**.515**	.000	.375	1.1	.4	.1	.6	1.5
2005–06	Orlando	30	1	20.9	.507	—	.595	4.1	1.1	.4	**2.1**	7.6
2006–07	Orlando	**80**	16	23.9	.454	.000	.613	5.5	1.1	.6	1.8	8.0
2007–08	Memphis	70	64	23.8	.438	.000	.554	**6.1**	.8	.5	1.6	7.2
2008–09	Memphis	61	15	17.0	**.515**	—	.562	4.3	.6	.4	.8	5.5
2009–10	New York	8	0	8.9	.471	—	—	2.3	.5	.5	.1	2.0
2009–10	Minnesota	24	18	**25.6**	.492	.000	.536	5.5	**1.8**	**.8**	1.4	8.3
2010–11	Minnesota	69	**69**	24.4	.469	—	.557	5.2	1.5	**.8**	2.0	**8.8**
2011–12	Minnesota	29	23	16.3	.454	—	.432	3.3	.6	.3	.9	4.6
2012–13	Boston	1	0	5.0	.000	—	—	1.0	.0	.0	.0	.0
**Career**		468	208	18.5	.460	.000	.574	4.2	.9	.4	1.3	6.0

=== Playoffs ===
Year	Team	GP	GS	MPG	FG%	3P%	FT%	RPG	APG	SPG	BPG	PPG
2004†	Detroit	8	0	1.8	.000	—	.250	.4	.1	.1	.0	.1
2005	Detroit	**9**	0	2.3	.286	—	**1.000**	.4	.1	.0	.1	.6
2007	Orlando	4	0	**28.8**	**.588**	—	.529	**4.5**	**1.0**	**.3**	**1.0**	**12.3**
**Career**		21	0	7.1	.489	.000	.500	1.2	.3	.1	.2	2.6

== Kickboxing record ==
Professional kickboxing record
0 wins, 1 loss
Date	Result	Opponent	Event	Location	Method	Round	Time	Record
2014-12-18	Loss	(Serbia) Radovan Radojčin	SOUL Night of Champions	Novi Sad, Serbia	TKO (Cut)	2		0–1
Kickboxing debut, 3x2.
Legend: Win Loss Draw/No contest Notes

== See also ==
- List of European basketball players in the United States
- List of oldest and youngest NBA players
- List of Serbian NBA players
