= Shavlik Randolph =

American basketball player (born 1983)

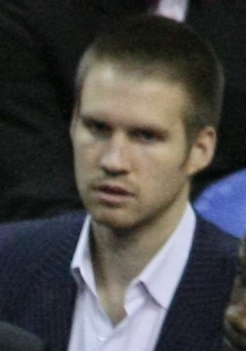
- Randolph with the Miami Heat in 2009

Personal information
- Born: November 24, 1983 (age 42) Raleigh, North Carolina, U.S.
- Listed height: 6 ft 10 in (2.08 m)
- Listed weight: 236 lb (107 kg)

Career information
- High school: Broughton (Raleigh, North Carolina)
- College: Duke (2002–2005)
- NBA draft: 2005: undrafted
- Playing career: 2005–2019
- Position: Power forward
- Number: 42, 43

Career history
- 2005–2008: Philadelphia 76ers
- 2008–2009: Portland Trail Blazers
- 2009: Miami Heat
- 2009–2010: Portland Trail Blazers
- 2010: Miami Heat
- 2011: Gallitos de Isabela
- 2011–2012: Dongguan Leopards
- 2012: Piratas de Quebradillas
- 2012–2013: Foshan Dralions
- 2013: Boston Celtics
- 2013: Foshan Dralions
- 2014–2015: Phoenix Suns
- 2015: Boston Celtics
- 2015–2017: Liaoning Flying Leopards
- 2017–2019: Beijing Fly Dragons
- 2019: Utsunomiya Brex

Career highlights
- CBA scoring champion (2013); McDonald's All-American (2002); North Carolina Mr. Basketball (2002); First-team Parade All-American (2002); Second-team Parade All-American (2001)
- Stats at NBA.com
- Stats at Basketball Reference

Ronald Shavlik Randolph (born November 24, 1983) is an American former professional basketball player. He played college basketball for the Duke Blue Devils after a decorated high school career. After going undrafted in the 2005 NBA draft, Randolph played parts of eight seasons in the National Basketball Association (NBA).

In addition to playing in the NBA, Randolph has played in China and Puerto Rico, averaging a league-high 32.0 points per game during the 2012–13 CBA season and was ranked in the top-five for rebounds per game in both his seasons in the Baloncesto Superior Nacional.

== High school career ==
Randolph attended Broughton High School in Raleigh, North Carolina. He scored 56 points in a game to surpass Broughton High alum Pete Maravich's all-time single-game record and later, passed him in career points, rebounds and blocks as well.

Randolph was a McDonald's All-American, two-time Parade All-American, and a two-time Associated Press North Carolina Player of the Year. As a junior in 2000–01, he averaged 27.9 points and 13.2 rebounds per game. As a senior in 2001–02, he averaged 30 points, 14 rebounds and five blocks per game.

As a senior, Randolph was rated as the #6 power forward in the nation by Scout.com.

== College career ==
Randolph started his college career with Duke by scoring a team-high 23 points and adding 7 rebounds in his November 23, 2002, debut against Army. Two days later, Randolph posted his first double-double against Davidson. Randolph's performance, however, started to decline after this stellar start, only scoring in double figures in five other games for the rest of the season. He suffered from numerous injuries which limited his playing time. He played in twenty-six games his freshman year (with six starts), averaging 7.4 points and 3.9 rebounds per game.

In May 2003, Randolph had successful surgery on his left hip to correct a labral tear and bone spur. In his sophomore year, Randolph played in all 37 of Duke's games, averaging 7.0 points, 4.5 rebounds and 1.6 blocks per game. Randolph's game excelled during Duke's 2004 run to the Final Four. In the opening round, Randolph posted 20 points, 8 rebounds and 2 steals against Alabama State. Randolph also played well in the national semi-final game against UConn, scoring 13 points on 6-for-6 shooting with six rebounds and one blocked shot.

In his junior year, Randolph averaged 4.4 points and 4.3 rebounds in 29 games (18.9 mpg). He sat out four games during the season after being diagnosed with mononucleosis, and slowly worked his way back into the rotation. He eventually returned to his starting role, giving the Blue Devils another inside presence to go with center Shelden Williams.

On May 13, 2005, Randolph declared for the NBA draft, forgoing his final year of college eligibility. In his three-year career at Duke, he played 92 games (36 starts) while averaging 6.3 points, 4.3 rebounds and 1.4 blocks per game. He was also a member of two ACC regular season championships, two ACC tournament championships, and one Final Four appearance.

=== College statistics ===
Year	Team	GP	GS	MPG	FG%	3P%	FT%	RPG	APG	SPG	BPG	PPG
2002–03	Duke	26	6	13.5	.504	.368	.683	3.9	.3	.5	.9	7.4
2003–04	Duke	37	10	19.2	.591	.200	.667	4.5	.5	.7	1.6	7.0
2004–05	Duke	29	20	18.9	.393	.231	.533	4.3	.9	1.0	1.5	4.4

== Professional career ==
=== Philadelphia 76ers (2005–2008) ===
Randolph went undrafted in the 2005 NBA draft. On August 5, 2005, he signed with the Philadelphia 76ers. On June 30, 2006, the 76ers tendered a qualifying offer to make Randolph a restricted free agent.

On July 12, 2006, Randolph re-signed with the 76ers to a two-year, $2.1 million contract with the second year containing a player option. Two days later, he joined the 76ers for the 2006 Rocky Mountain Revue.

On November 30, 2006, Randolph broke his left ankle at practice and was taken by ambulance to a hospital. He was playing defense when he landed on the foot of Andre Iguodala. He was subsequently ruled out for the rest of the 2006–07 season.

On June 22, 2007, Randolph exercised the player option on his contract, keeping him with the team for a third season. In July 2007, he re-joined the 76ers for the 2007 NBA Summer League but did not end up playing for them in either the Las Vegas entry or the Rocky Mountain Revue entry.

=== Portland Trail Blazers and Miami Heat (2008–2010) ===
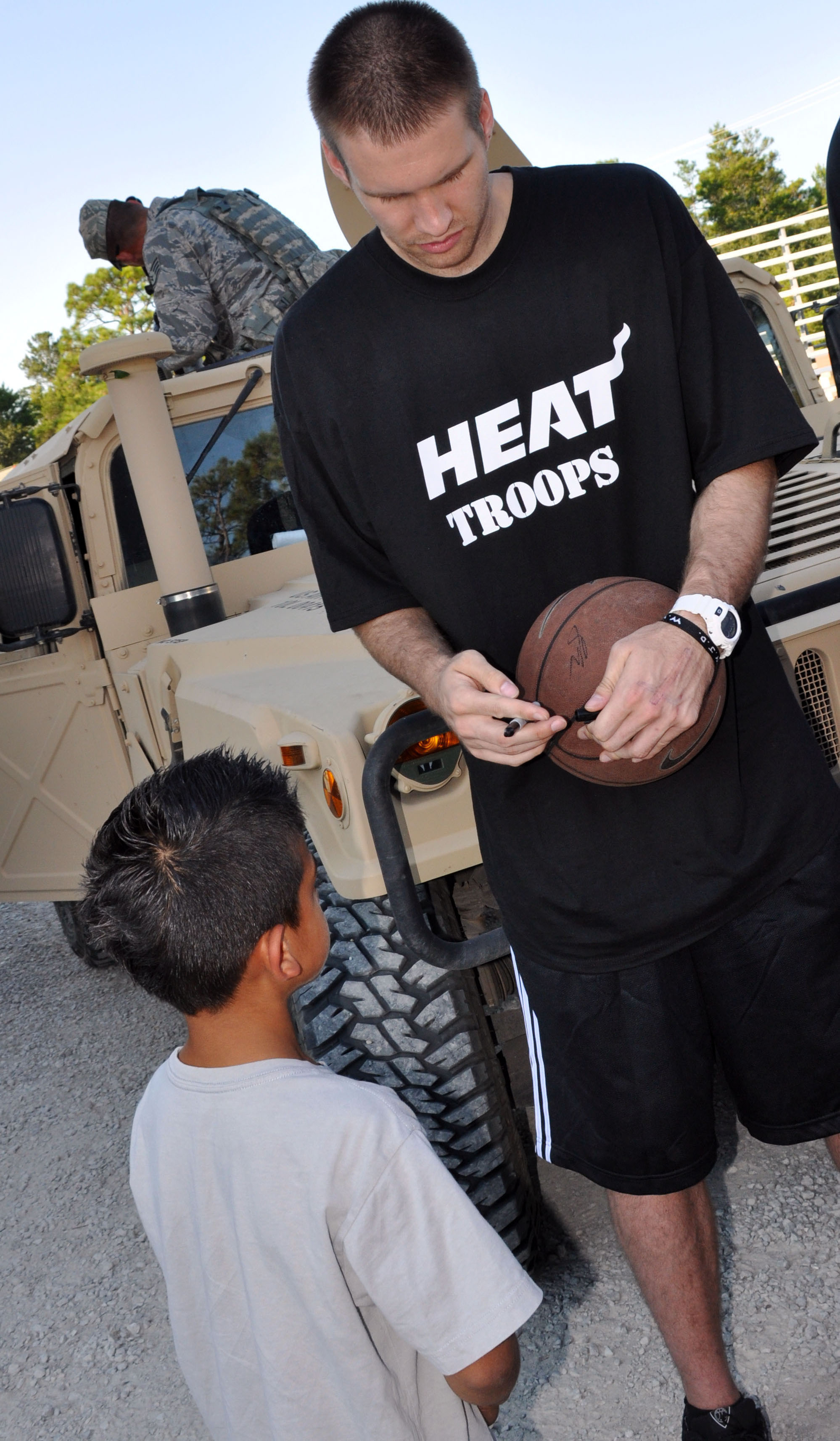
Shavlik Randolph signs a basketball for a young fan at Eglin Air Force Base in 2010

On September 25, 2008, Randolph signed with the Portland Trail Blazers. His first game of the 2008–09 season came on January 14, 2009, against his former team, the 76ers, where he managed four points in as many minutes.

On September 28, 2009, Randolph signed with the Miami Heat. He managed just two games for the Heat before he was waived on December 14, 2009. On December 30, 2009, he re-signed with the Trail Blazers to help the team deal with numerous injuries. Portland had to use an NBA hardship exemption in order to sign him as he made their roster stand at 16, one over the allowed limited of 15. His second stint did not last long as he was waived by Portland on January 6 after playing just three games. However, two days later, he signed a 10-day contract with the Trail Blazers. After his 10-day contract expired, he parted ways with the team.

On April 6, 2010, Randolph re-signed with the Heat for the rest of the 2009–10 season. In early July 2010, he joined the Heat for the 2010 NBA Summer League where he averaged 13.0 points and 5.8 rebounds in four games. On July 27, 2010, he again re-signed with the Heat but was later waived on October 20, 2010, before the start of the 2010–11 season.

=== Puerto Rico and China (2011–2012) ===
In March 2011, Randolph signed with Gallitos de Isabela for the 2011 BSN season.

In October 2011, Randolph signed with the Dongguan Leopards for the 2011–12 CBA season.

On April 9, 2012, Randolph signed with Piratas de Quebradillas for the 2012 BSN season.

=== Washington Wizards (2012) ===
In July 2012, Randolph joined the Washington Wizards for the 2012 NBA Summer League. On September 19, 2012, he signed with the Wizards. However, he was later waived by the Wizards on October 27, 2012, before the start of the 2012–13 season.

=== Foshan Long Lions (2012–2013) ===
On November 23, 2012, Randolph signed with the Foshan Long Lions for the rest of the 2012–13 CBA season. On February 5, 2013, he signed with Cangrejeros de Santurce for the 2013 BSN season. However, following the CBA season, he returned to the United States with hopes of re-joining the NBA. In 28 games for Foshan, he averaged 32.0 points, 14.6 rebounds, 1.4 assists and 1.7 steals per game.

=== Boston Celtics (2013) ===
On March 1, 2013, Randolph signed a 10-day contract with the Boston Celtics. On March 11, 2013, he signed a second 10-day contract with the Celtics. On March 21, 2013, he signed a multi-year contract with the Celtics. On August 1, 2013, he was waived by the Celtics.

=== Return to Foshan (2013) ===
In October 2013, Randolph re-signed with the Foshan Long Lions for the 2013–14 CBA season. However, just six games into the season, he was ruled out for 4–5 weeks with a left shoulder injury and was replaced in the line-up by Dexter Pittman on December 3, 2013.

=== Phoenix Suns (2014–2015) ===
On March 1, 2014, Randolph signed with the Phoenix Suns for the rest of the 2013–14 season, with a team option for 2014–15. He made his debut off the bench a day later against the Atlanta Hawks, recording 2 points, 2 rebounds and 1 steal in the 129–120 win. His contract became fully guaranteed for 2014–15 after the Suns did not release him prior to the July 17 cut off date.

=== Return to Boston (2015) ===
On January 15, 2015, Randolph was acquired by the Boston Celtics in a three-team trade also involving the Los Angeles Clippers. On April 6, 2015, he was waived by the Celtics after appearing in just five games.

On April 8, 2015, Randolph was claimed off waivers by the Denver Nuggets. However, he was later released by the Nuggets before appearing in a game for them.

=== Return to China (2015–2019) ===
On July 31, 2015, Randolph signed a three-year deal with the Liaoning Flying Leopards.

== NBA career statistics ==
Legend
GP	Games played	GS	Games started	MPG	Minutes per game
FG%	Field goal percentage	3P%	3-point field goal percentage	FT%	Free throw percentage
RPG	Rebounds per game	APG	Assists per game	SPG	Steals per game
BPG	Blocks per game	PPG	Points per game	**Bold**	Career high

=== Regular season ===
Year	Team	GP	GS	MPG	FG%	3P%	FT%	RPG	APG	SPG	BPG	PPG
2005–06	Philadelphia	**57**	1	8.5	.454	.000	.606	2.3	**.3**	.3	.2	2.3
2006–07	Philadelphia	13	**6**	13.8	.479	.000	.545	4.2	**.3**	**.5**	**.8**	**4.5**
2007–08	Philadelphia	9	0	3.0	.286	.000	.000	1.2	**.3**	.1	.3	.9
2008–09	Portland	10	0	3.7	**.615**	**1.000**	.250	1.8	.0	.0	.1	1.8
2009–10	Miami	3	0	**15.7**	.333	.000	.000	4.3	.0	.3	.3	3.3
2009–10	Portland	3	0	2.0	.333	.000	**1.000**	.3	**.3**	.0	.0	1.3
2012–13	Boston	16	0	12.4	.583	.000	.407	**4.4**	**.3**	**.5**	.4	4.2
2013–14	Phoenix	14	0	6.8	.500	.000	.545	1.8	.1	.2	.1	1.4
2014–15	Phoenix	16	0	6.3	.240	.000	.500	1.6	.2	.3	.1	1.1
2014–15	Boston	5	0	5.0	.300	.000	.500	2.4	.2	.2	.2	1.4
Career		146	7	8.2	.449	.167	.544	2.5	.2	.3	.3	2.3

=== Playoffs ===
Year	Team	GP	GS	MPG	FG%	3P%	FT%	RPG	APG	SPG	BPG	PPG
2008	Philadelphia	**2**	0	2.0	.000	.000	**.750**	.0	.0	.0	.0	**1.5**
2013	Boston	1	0	**3.0**	.000	.000	.000	**3.0**	.0	.0	.0	.0
Career		3	0	2.3	.000	.000	.750	1.0	.0	.0	.0	1.0

== Off the court ==
Randolph is a co-founder of North Carolina–based Big Prime Hauling, which was acquired by Bright Hope Capital in August 2020. He is also credited, along with several other NBA players, as an early investor in Fotmer Life Sciences, LLC., founded in South America in 2016.

== Personal life ==
Randolph is the son of Ken and Kim Randolph who both attended the University of North Carolina. His grandfather, Ronnie Shavlik, was an All-American basketball player at N.C. State and a first-round draft pick of the New York Knicks in 1956. As a child, Randolph worked as a ball boy for the N.C. State team. He also has a brother, Dexter and a sister, Senna. His brother Dexter, died on October 8, 2019, in Tochigi, Japan.
