= KK I Came to Play =

Basketball club in Novi Sad, Serbia

I Came to Play
- Leagues: First Regional League
- Founded: 2019; 7 years ago
- History: KK I Came to Play (2019–present)
- Arena: SPC Vojvodina
- Capacity: 1,030
- Location: Novi Sad, Serbia
- Team colors: Blue and white
- Head coach: Žarko Gagričić
- Ownership: SHO Play

Košarkaški klub I Came to Play, commonly referred to as KK I Came to Play, is a men's amateur basketball club based in Novi Sad, Serbia. They are currently competing in the 3rd-tier First Regional League, North Division.

== History ==
The club came to media attention in mid-2019, when they signed retired professional players Darko Miličić, Jovo Stanojević, Branko Cvetković and Dragan Ćeranić.

== Home arena ==
I Came to Play play their home games at the small hall of the SPC Vojvodina, which is located in Novi Sad. It has a seating capacity of 1,030.

== Coaches ==
- Žarko Gagričić (2019–present)

== Notable players ==
- (Serbia) Darko Miličić
- (Serbia) Jovo Stanojević
