= Branko Cvetković =

Serbian basketball player

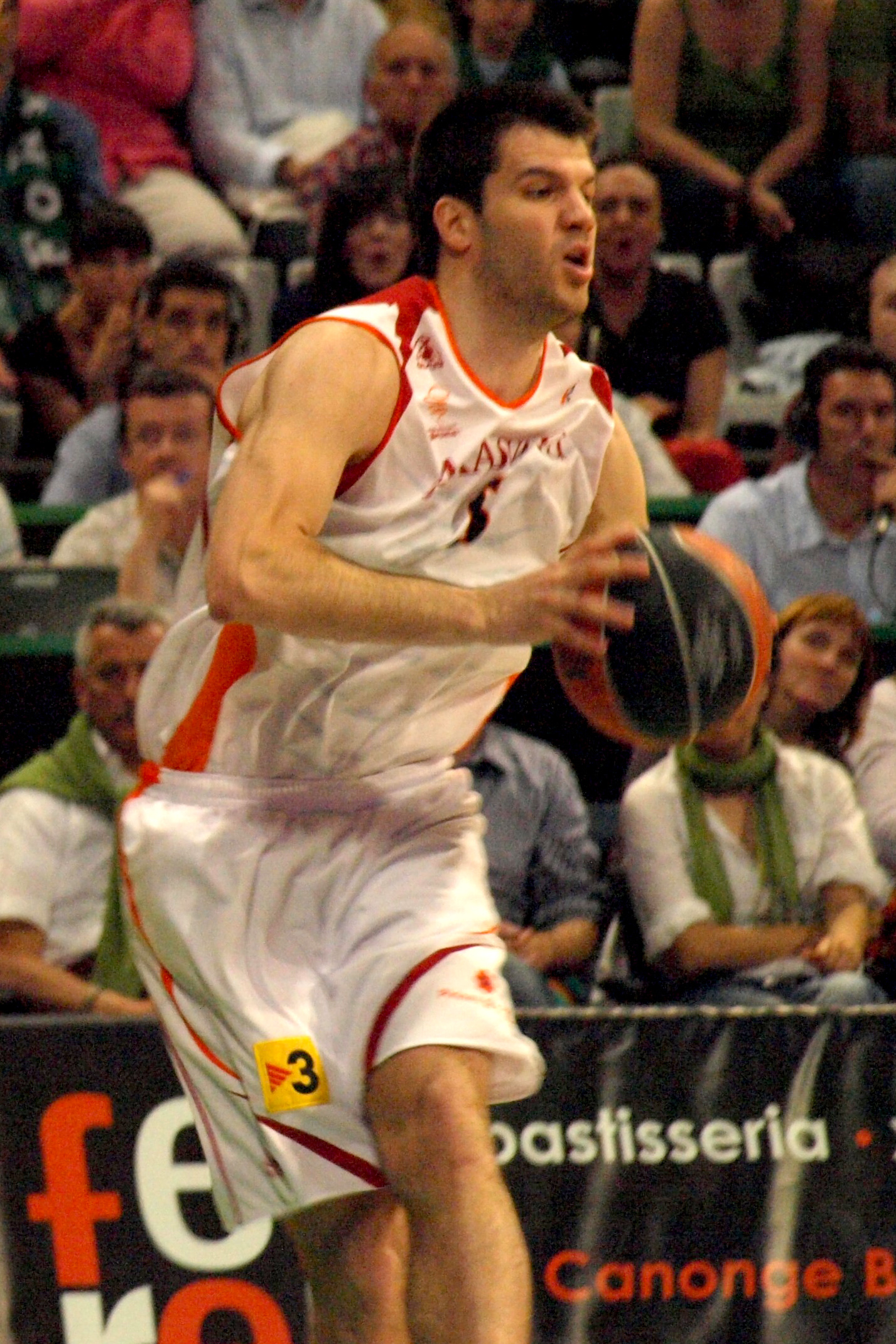
- Cvetković with CB Girona in 2008

Personal information
- Born: 5 March 1984 (age 42) Gračanica, SFR Yugoslavia
- Listed height: 2.00 m (6 ft 7 in)
- Listed weight: 102 kg (225 lb)

Career information
- NBA draft: 2006: undrafted
- Playing career: 2001–2023
- Position: Small forward

Career history
- 2001–2004: Spartak Subotica
- 2004–2005: Borac Čačak
- 2005–2007: FMP Železnik
- 2007–2008: Girona
- 2008–2009: Panionios
- 2009: CAI Zaragoza
- 2009: FMP Železnik
- 2009–2010: Scavolini Pesaro
- 2010–2011: Donetsk
- 2011–2014: Astana
- 2015: Montakit Fuenlabrada
- 2016: Tadamon Zouk
- 2016: Guaros de Lara
- 2016–2017: Sporting Al Riyadi Beirut
- 2019–2023: I Came to Play

Career highlights
- FIBA Intercontinental Cup champion (2016); Adriatic League champion (2006); Radivoj Korać Cup winner (2007); Lebanese League champion (2017)

Branko Cvetković (Serbian Cyrillic: Бранко Цветковић, born 5 March 1984) is a retired Serbian professional basketball player. He also represented the Serbian national team internationally. He is 2.00 m (6 ft 6 ¾ in) tall and plays at the shooting guard and small forward positions.

== Professional career ==
Cvetković came up through youth systems at Spartak Subotica and Borac Čačak. After making a name for himself with the Basketball League of Serbia club FMP Železnik by winning the Adriatic League championship in the 2005–06 season and the Serbian Cup in the 2006–07 season, he signed with CB Girona of the Spanish ACB League for the 2007–08 season. In Girona, he averaged 9.1 points per game in the Spanish League, and 10.1 points per game in the ULEB Cup (now called EuroCup) league, where Girona progressed all the way to the league's final game.

On 2 August 2008, it was announced that Cvetković signed with the Greek EuroLeague club Panionios In April 2009 he joined the Spanish club CAI Zaragoza until the end of the season. In November 2009 he signed open contract with his former club FMP Železnik, but he played only 3 games and then signed with Scavolini Pesaro. In August 2010, he signed with Ukrainian team Donetsk.

In June 2011, he signed a one-year deal with Astana from Kazakhstan. In April 2012, he re-signed with them for one more season. In June 2013, he re-signed again with them for one more season.

On 7 February 2015, Cvetković signed with Montakit Fuenlabrada of the Liga ACB.

In September 2019, Cvetković joined I Came to Play of the amateur 4th-tier Serbian League.

== National team career ==
Cvetković was member of the Serbian national basketball team at the EuroBasket 2007.

== See also ==
- List of Serbia men's national basketball team players
