= 2012–13 Boston Celtics season =

Season of National Basketball Association team the Boston Celtics

- Head coach: Doc Rivers
- General manager: Danny Ainge
- Owners: Boston Basketball Partners
- Arena: TD Garden

Results
- Record: 41–40 (.506)
- Place: Division: 3rd (Atlantic); Conference: 7th (Eastern)
- Playoff finish: First Round (lost to Knicks 2–4)
- Stats at Basketball Reference

Local media
- Television: CSN New England
- Radio: WEEI-FM

The 2012–13 Boston Celtics season was the 67th season of the franchise in the National Basketball Association (NBA). The Celtics finished the regular season with a 41–40 won-loss record, which was the 3rd best in the Atlantic division, bringing an end to the 5-year run as Atlantic Champs and 7th best in the East. Their longest winning and losing streaks were 7 and 6 games respectively. The leading scorer was Paul Pierce, averaging 18.6 PPG. The leading rebounder was Kevin Garnett (7.8 RPG). Rajon Rondo led the team and the league in assists per-game with 11.1 despite only playing 38 games due to ACL injury. The Celtics only played 81 games as their April 16 game against the Indiana Pacers was cancelled in the aftermath of the Boston Marathon bombing and was not rescheduled because it would not have changed any part of the final Eastern Conference standings anyway. The Celtics would go on to lose in the first round of the playoffs to the New York Knicks in six games, marking the first time the Celtics were eliminated in the first round of the playoffs since the 2004–05 season.

For the first time since 2006–07, Ray Allen was not on the roster as he signed with the Miami Heat where he won his second title. This season would mark the end of the Pierce and Garnett era in Boston as they, along with Jason Terry, were traded to the Brooklyn Nets during the 2013 off-season.

== Key dates ==
- June 28: The 2012 NBA draft took place at Prudential Center in Newark, New Jersey.
- October 30: The regular season begins with a 120–107 loss to the Miami Heat in a rematch from the previous season's playoffs.
- January 25: Rajon Rondo suffered a partially torn ACL injury in his right knee after a loss to the Atlanta Hawks and will miss the remainder of the season but is expected to be back by training camp for the 2013/14 season.
- February 1: Jared Sullinger underwent lumbar disc surgery in his back and will also miss the remainder of the season.
- February 11: Leandro Barbosa suffered a torn ACL in his left knee, along with a sprained MCL. He will be out for the rest of the season.
- April 3: Clinched a Playoffs berth with a win over the Detroit Pistons.

== Pre-season ==
=== Game log ===
2012 pre-season game log
Pre-season: 3–5 (home: 1–3; road: 2–2)

Game	Date	Team	Score	High points	High rebounds	High assists	Location Attendance	Record
1	October 5	@ Fenerbahçe Ülker	L 91–97	Jeff Green, Jared Sullinger (16)	Jared Sullinger (8)	Rajon Rondo (9)	Ülker Sports Arena; 12,191	0–1
2	October 8	@ EA7 Emporio Armani Milano	W 105–75	Jeff Green, Rajon Rondo (17)	Darko Miličić (9)	Rajon Rondo (6)	Mediolanum Forum	1–1
3	October 13	New York Knicks	L 95–98	Jared Sullinger (14)	Micah Downs, Rajon Rondo, Jared Sullinger (7)	Rajon Rondo, Jason Terry (4)	XL Center	1–2
4	October 15	@ Philadelphia 76ers	L 75–107	Paul Pierce (16)	Brandon Bass, Paul Pierce (6)	Rajon Rondo (6)	Wells Fargo Center	1–3
5	October 16	Brooklyn Nets	L 95–96	Paul Pierce (29)	Jared Sullinger (9)	Rajon Rondo (11)	TD Garden	1–4
6	October 18	@ Brooklyn Nets	W 115–85	Courtney Lee, Paul Pierce (18)	Jeff Green, Jared Sullinger (6)	Rajon Rondo (9)	Barclays Center	2–4
7	October 20	New York Knicks	W 109–98	Jeff Green (25)	Jared Sullinger (8)	Rajon Rondo (11)	Times Union Center	3–4
8	October 21	Philadelphia 76ers	L 79–88	Jeff Green, Rajon Rondo (12)	Jeff Green (10)	Rajon Rondo (10)	TD Garden	3–5

2012–13 season schedule

== Draft picks ==
Round	Pick	Player	Position	Nationality	College/Club Team
1	21	Jared Sullinger	PF	United States	Ohio State
1	22	Fab Melo (pick traded from the L.A. Clippers via Oklahoma City Thunder)	C	Brazil	Syracuse
2	51	Kris Joseph	SF	Canada	Syracuse

== Future draft picks ==
=== Credits ===
2014 second-round draft pick from Brooklyn

Brooklyn's own 2014 2nd-round pick to Boston. [Boston – Brooklyn, 6/23/2011]

2015 second-round draft pick from Sacramento

Sacramento's own 2015 2nd-round pick to Boston (top 55 protected in the 2015 Draft). If Sacramento's own 2015 2nd-round pick is in the top 55 picks, then Sacramento's obligations to Boston shall be extinguished. [Boston – Sacramento, 2/17/2009]

2017 second-round draft pick from Sacramento

Sacramento's own 2017 2nd-round pick to Boston (top 55 protected in the 2017 Draft). If Sacramento's own 2017 2nd-round pick is in the top 55 picks, then Sacramento's obligations to Boston shall be extinguished. [Boston – Sacramento, 2/24/2011]

=== Debits ===
2013 second-round draft pick to Portland

Boston's own 2013 2nd-round pick to Portland. [Boston-Houston-Portland, 7/20/2012]

== Roster ==
2012-13 Boston Celtics roster
Players

Pos.	No.	Player	Height	Weight	DOB	From
PF	30	Brandon Bass	6 ft 8 in (2.03 m)	250 lb (113 kg)	1985-04-30	LSU
PG	0	Avery Bradley	6 ft 2 in (1.88 m)	180 lb (82 kg)	1990-11-26	Texas
SG	27	Jordan Crawford	6 ft 4 in (1.93 m)	195 lb (88 kg)	1988–10–23	Xavier
PF	5	Kevin Garnett	6 ft 11 in (2.11 m)	253 lb (115 kg)	1976-05-19	Farragut Academy (IL)
SF	8	Jeff Green	6 ft 9 in (2.06 m)	235 lb (107 kg)	1986–08–28	Georgetown
SG	11	Courtney Lee	6 ft 5 in (1.96 m)	200 lb (91 kg)	1985–10–03	Western Kentucky
C	13	Fab Melo	7 ft 0 in (2.13 m)	255 lb (116 kg)	1990–06–20	Syracuse
SF	34	Paul Pierce	6 ft 7 in (2.01 m)	235 lb (107 kg)	1977-10-13	Kansas
PF	42	Shavlik Randolph	6 ft 10 in (2.08 m)	236 lb (107 kg)	1983–11–24	Duke
PG	9	Rajon Rondo	6 ft 1 in (1.85 m)	186 lb (84 kg)	1986-02-22	Kentucky
PF	7	Jared Sullinger	6 ft 9 in (2.06 m)	260 lb (118 kg)	1992-03-04	Ohio State
PG	4	Jason Terry	6 ft 2 in (1.88 m)	180 lb (82 kg)	1977–09–15	Arizona
PF	12	D.J. White	6 ft 9 in (2.06 m)	260 lb (118 kg)	1986–08–31	Indiana
PF	44	Chris Wilcox	6 ft 10 in (2.08 m)	235 lb (107 kg)	1982–09–03	Maryland
SG	55	Terrence Williams	6 ft 6 in (1.98 m)	220 lb (100 kg)	1987–06–28	Louisville

Coaches
Head coach
- Doc Rivers
Assistant(s)
- Kevin Eastman
- Armond Hill
- Mike Longabardi
- Tyronn Lue
- Jamie Young
- Jay Larranaga

Legend
- (DP) Unsigned draft pick
- (FA) Free agent
- (S) Suspended
- (DL) On assignment to D-League affiliate
- Injured

== Regular season ==
=== Game log ===
Note: the Boston Celtics only played 81 games instead of 82 due to the cancellation of the scheduled April 16, 2013 game vs The Indiana Pacers after the Boston Marathon bombing.

2012–13 game log
Total: 41–40 (home: 27–13; road: 14–27)
October: 0–1 (home: 0–0; road: 0–1)

Game	Date	Team	Score	High points	High rebounds	High assists	Location Attendance	Record
1	October 30	@ Miami	L 107–120	Paul Pierce (23)	Kevin Garnett (12)	Rajon Rondo (13)	American Airlines Arena; 20,296	0–1

November : 9–6 (home: 5–4; road: 4–2)

Game	Date	Team	Score	High points	High rebounds	High assists	Location Attendance	Record
2	November 2	Milwaukee	L 88–99	Kevin Garnett (15)	Jared Sullinger (7)	Rajon Rondo (11)	TD Garden; 18,624	0–2
3	November 3	@ Washington	W 89–86	Paul Pierce (27)	Garnett, Pierce & Sullinger (7)	Rajon Rondo (12)	Verizon Center; 20,308	1–2
4	November 7	Washington	W 100–94	Kevin Garnett (20)	Kevin Garnett (13)	Rajon Rondo (14)	TD Garden; 18,624	2–2
5	November 9	Philadelphia	L 100–106	Paul Pierce (24)	Kevin Garnett (10)	Rajon Rondo (20)	TD Garden; 18,624	2–3
6	November 10	@ Milwaukee	W 96–92	Paul Pierce (25)	Paul Pierce (9)	Rajon Rondo (11)	Bradley Center; 14,589	3–3
7	November 12	@ Chicago	W 101–95	Rajon Rondo (20)	Rajon Rondo (9)	Rajon Rondo (10)	United Center; 21,712	4–3
8	November 14	Utah	W 98–93	Paul Pierce (23)	Kevin Garnett (8)	Rajon Rondo (10)	TD Garden; 18,624	5–3
9	November 15	@ Brooklyn	L 97–102	Paul Pierce (22)	Courtney Lee (9)	Jason Terry (6)	Barclays Center; 17,732	5–4
10	November 17	Toronto	W 107–89	Jason Terry (20)	Jared Sullinger (11)	Rajon Rondo (20)	TD Garden; 18,624	6–4
11	November 18	@ Detroit	L 83–103	Jared Sullinger (16)	Sullinger & Wilcox (5)	Rajon Rondo (10)	The Palace of Auburn Hills; 12,214	6–5
12	November 21	San Antonio	L 100–112	Rajon Rondo (22)	Jared Sullinger (7)	Rajon Rondo (15)	TD Garden; 18,624	6–6
13	November 23	Oklahoma City	W 108–100	Paul Pierce (27)	Kevin Garnett (9)	Rajon Rondo (16)	TD Garden; 18,624	7–6
14	November 25	@ Orlando	W 116–110	Kevin Garnett (24)	Brandon Bass (12)	Rajon Rondo (16)	Amway Center; 17,037	8–6
15	November 28	Brooklyn	L 83–95	Bass & Garnett (16)	Kevin Garnett (10)	Paul Pierce (7)	TD Garden; 18,624	8–7
16	November 30	Portland	W 96–78	Jeff Green (19)	Pierce & Sullinger (8)	Lee & Pierce (7)	TD Garden; 18,624	9–7

December : 5–9 (home: 4–1; road: 1–8)

Game	Date	Team	Score	High points	High rebounds	High assists	Location Attendance	Record
17	December 1	@ Milwaukee	L 88–91	Paul Pierce (19)	Brandon Bass (8)	Jason Terry (11)	Bradley Center; 16,581	9–8
18	December 5	Minnesota	W 104–94	Garnett & Pierce (18)	Kevin Garnett (10)	Rajon Rondo (11)	TD Garden; 18,624	10–8
19	December 7	@ Philadelphia	L 94–95	Paul Pierce (27)	Rajon Rondo (13)	Rajon Rondo (14)	Wells Fargo Center; 17,921	10–9
20	December 8	Philadelphia	W 92–79	Kevin Garnett (19)	Rondo & Sullinger (9)	Rajon Rondo (11)	TD Garden; 18,624	11–9
21	December 12	Dallas	W 117–115	Paul Pierce (34)	Rajon Rondo (9)	Rajon Rondo (15)	TD Garden; 18,624	12–9
22	December 14	@ Houston	L 89–101	Paul Pierce (18)	Green & Pierce (7)	Rajon Rondo (13)	Toyota Center; 15,679	12–10
23	December 15	@ San Antonio	L 88–103	Pierce & Terry (18)	Jared Sullinger (7)	Rajon Rondo (9)	AT&T Center; 18,759	12–11
24	December 18	@ Chicago	L 88–100	Rajon Rondo (26)	Bass & Garnett (8)	Rajon Rondo (8)	United Center; 21,825	12–12
25	December 19	Cleveland	W 103–91	Paul Pierce (40)	Paul Pierce (8)	Rajon Rondo (8)	TD Garden; 18,624	13–12
26	December 21	Milwaukee	L 94–99	Paul Pierce (35)	Paul Pierce (12)	Rajon Rondo (11)	TD Garden; 18,624	13–13
27	December 25	@ Brooklyn	W 93–76	Rajon Rondo (19)	Kevin Garnett (10)	Paul Pierce (10)	Barclays Center; 17,732	14–13
28	December 27	@ L. A. Clippers	L 77–106	Kevin Garnett (16)	Brandon Bass (9)	Rajon Rondo (6)	Staples Center; 19,552	14–14
29	December 29	@ Golden State	L 83–101	Courtney Lee (18)	Jeff Green (9)	Kevin Garnett (4)	Oracle Arena; 19,596	14–15
30	December 30	@ Sacramento	L 96–118	Pierce & Terry (20)	Kevin Garnett (12)	Rajon Rondo (10)	Sleep Train Arena; 15,305	14–16

January : 8–7 (home: 6–4; road: 2–3)

Game	Date	Team	Score	High points	High rebounds	High assists	Location Attendance	Record
31	January 2	Memphis	L 83–93	Paul Pierce (17)	Garnett & Pierce (7)	Rajon Rondo (10)	TD Garden; 18,624	14–17
32	January 4	Indiana	W 94–75	Garnett & Rondo (18)	Jared Sullinger (10)	Rajon Rondo (7)	TD Garden; 18,624	15–17
33	January 5	@ Atlanta	W 89–81	Paul Pierce (26)	Rajon Rondo (11)	Rajon Rondo (10)	Philips Arena; 19,159	16–17
34	January 7	@ New York	W 102–96	Paul Pierce (23)	Kevin Garnett (10)	Paul Pierce (6)	Madison Square Garden; 19,033	17–17
35	January 9	Phoenix	W 87–79	Jeff Green (14)	Jared Sullinger (16)	Rajon Rondo (8)	TD Garden; 18,624	18–17
36	January 11	Houston	W 103–91	Paul Pierce (23)	Jared Sullinger (11)	Rajon Rondo (8)	TD Garden; 18,624	19–17
37	January 14	Charlotte	W 100–89	Paul Pierce (19)	Garnett & Rondo (10)	Rajon Rondo (12)	TD Garden; 18,624	20–17
38	January 16	New Orleans	L 78–90	Kevin Garnett (15)	Paul Pierce (10)	Rajon Rondo (11)	TD Garden; 18,624	20–18
39	January 18	Chicago	L 99–100 (OT)	Rajon Rondo (30)	Jared Sullinger (15)	Rajon Rondo (7)	TD Garden; 18,624	20–19
40	January 20	@ Detroit	L 88–103	Garnett & Lee (16)	Rajon Rondo (9)	Rajon Rondo (15)	The Palace of Auburn Hills; 17,575	20–20
41	January 22	@ Cleveland	L 90–95	Rajon Rondo (17)	Rajon Rondo (13)	Rajon Rondo (8)	Quicken Loans Arena; 14,192	20–21
42	January 24	New York	L 86–89	Rajon Rondo (23)	Kevin Garnett (12)	Rajon Rondo (11)	TD Garden; 18,624	20–22
43	January 25	@ Atlanta	L 111–123 (2OT)	Kevin Garnett (24)	Garnett & Rondo (10)	Rajon Rondo (11)	Philips Arena; 15,595	20–23
44	January 27	Miami	W 100–98 (2OT)	Kevin Garnett (24)	Paul Pierce (13)	Paul Pierce (10)	TD Garden; 18,624	21–23
45	January 30	Sacramento	W 99–81	Paul Pierce (16)	Paul Pierce (10)	Kevin Garnett (5)	TD Garden; 18,624	22–23

February : 8–4 (home: 5–0; road: 3–4)

Game	Date	Team	Score	High points	High rebounds	High assists	Location Attendance	Record
46	February 1	Orlando	W 97–84	Jeff Green (17)	Paul Pierce (11)	Paul Pierce (7)	TD Garden; 18,624	23–23
47	February 3	L. A. Clippers	W 106–104	Paul Pierce (22)	Brandon Bass (8)	Jason Terry (6)	TD Garden; 18,624	24–23
48	February 6	@ Toronto	W 99–95	Kevin Garnett (27)	Paul Pierce (11)	Paul Pierce (6)	Air Canada Centre; 17,163	25–23
49	February 7	L. A. Lakers	W 116–95	Paul Pierce (24)	Chris Wilcox (9)	Paul Pierce (6)	TD Garden; 18,624	26–23
50	February 10	Denver	W 118–114 (3OT)	Paul Pierce (27)	Kevin Garnett (18)	Paul Pierce (14)	TD Garden; 18,624	27–23
51	February 11	@ Charlotte	L 91–94	Jeff Green (18)	Kevin Garnett (13)	Paul Pierce (8)	Time Warner Cable Arena; 15,709	27–24
52	February 13	Chicago	W 71–69	Brandon Bass (14)	Kevin Garnett (11)	Paul Pierce (6)	TD Garden; 18,624	28–24
All-Star Break
53	February 19	@ Denver	L 90–96	Jeff Green (20)	Garnett & Bass (9)	Paul Pierce (6)	Pepsi Center; 19,155	28–25
54	February 20	@ L. A. Lakers	L 99–113	Paul Pierce (26)	Jeff Green (7)	Paul Pierce (5)	Staples Center; 18,997	28–26
55	February 22	@ Phoenix	W 113–88	Jeff Green (31)	Chris Wilcox (8)	Williams & Green (4)	US Airways Center; 18,422	29–26
56	February 24	@ Portland	L 86–92	Paul Pierce (23)	Kevin Garnett (9)	Paul Pierce (8)	Rose Garden; 20,484	29–27
57	February 25	@ Utah	W 110–107	Paul Pierce (26)	Kevin Garnett (8)	Paul Pierce (8)	EnergySolutions Arena; 19,911	30–27

March : 8–8 (home: 5–2; road: 3–6)

Game	Date	Team	Score	High points	High rebounds	High assists	Location Attendance	Record
58	March 1	Golden State	W 94–86	Paul Pierce (26)	Kevin Garnett (13)	Pierce & Terry (4)	TD Garden; 18,624	31–27
59	March 5	@ Philadelphia	W 109–101	Avery Bradley (22)	Kevin Garnett (11)	Paul Pierce (7)	Wells Fargo Center; 16,189	32–27
60	March 6	@ Indiana	W 83–81	Kevin Garnett (18)	Kevin Garnett (10)	Pierce, Terry, Green, & Bradley (4)	Bankers Life Fieldhouse; 17,833	33–27
61	March 8	Atlanta	W 107–102 (OT)	Paul Pierce (27)	Kevin Garnett (8)	Paul Pierce (7)	TD Garden; 18,624	34–27
62	March 10	@ Oklahoma City	L 79–91	Paul Pierce (20)	Brandon Bass (13)	Paul Pierce (6)	Chesapeake Energy Arena; 18,203	34–28
63	March 12	@ Charlotte	L 74–100	Jeff Green (14)	Brandon Bass (7)	Lee & Terry (4)	Time Warner Cable Arena; 15,006	34–29
64	March 13	Toronto	W 112–88	Jeff Green (20)	Kevin Garnett (7)	Lee & Pierce (4)	TD Garden; 18,624	35–29
65	March 16	Charlotte	W 105–88	Jason Terry (15)	Shavlik Randolph (8)	Paul Pierce (8)	TD Garden; 18,624	36–29
66	March 18	Miami	L 103–105	Jeff Green (43)	Paul Pierce (8)	Paul Pierce (8)	TD Garden; 18,624	36–30
67	March 20	@ New Orleans	L 86–87	Paul Pierce (28)	Bass & Garnett (6)	Paul Pierce (5)	New Orleans Arena; 14,740	36–31
68	March 22	@ Dallas	L 94–104	Paul Pierce (16)	Kevin Garnett (12)	Kevin Garnett (5)	American Airlines Center; 20,387	36–32
69	March 23	@ Memphis	L 106–110	Paul Pierce (26)	Bass & Pierce (6)	Green & Paul Pierce (4)	FedExForum; 18,119	36–33
70	March 26	New York	L 85–100	Jeff Green (19)	Jeff Green (10)	Crawford, Green, & Pierce (6)	TD Garden; 18,624	36–34
71	March 27	@ Cleveland	W 93–92	Brandon Bass (22)	Paul Pierce (10)	Paul Pierce (8)	Quicken Loans Arena; 14,192	37–34
72	March 29	Atlanta	W 118–107	Jeff Green (27)	Shavlik Randolph (13)	Paul Pierce (10)	TD Garden; 18,624	38–34
73	March 31	@ New York	L 89–108	Jeff Green (27)	Paul Pierce (15)	Paul Pierce (5)	Madison Square Garden; 19,033	38–35

April : 3–5 (home: 2–2; road: 1–3)

Game	Date	Team	Score	High points	High rebounds	High assists	Location Attendance	Record
74	April 1	@ Minnesota	L 100–110	Avery Bradley (19)	Jeff Green (7)	Jeff Green (5)	Target Center; 14,546	38–36
75	April 3	Detroit	W 98–93	Jeff Green (34)	Brandon Bass (7)	Paul Pierce (5)	TD Garden; 18,624	39–36
76	April 5	Cleveland	L 91–97	Jeff Green (23)	Jeff Green (9)	Jordan Crawford (5)	TD Garden; 18,624	39–37
77	April 7	Washington	W 107–96	Brandon Bass (20)	Shavlik Randolph (7)	Lee, Pierce, & Terry (5)	TD Garden; 18,624	40–37
78	April 10	Brooklyn	L 93–101	Paul Pierce (23)	Shavlik Randolph (9)	Crawford & Garnett (4)	TD Garden; 18,624	40–38
79	April 12	@ Miami	L 101–109	Jeff Green (25)	Brandon Bass (9)	Jason Terry (3)	American Airlines Arena; 19,990	40–39
80	April 13	@ Orlando	W 120–88	Courtney Lee (20)	Kevin Garnett (9)	Paul Pierce (8)	Amway Center; 17,422	41–39
–	April 16	Indiana	Game canceled due to the Boston Marathon bombing.					
81	April 17	@ Toronto	L 90–114	Jordan Crawford (16)	Crawford & Green (6)	Crawford & Williams (5)	Air Canada Centre; 17,690	41–40

2012–13 season schedule

=== Standings ===
Atlantic Division	W	L	PCT	GB	Home	Road	Div	GP
y-New York Knicks	54	28	.659	–	31–10	23–18	10–6	82
x-Brooklyn Nets	49	33	.598	5	26–15	23–18	11–5	82
x-Boston Celtics	41	40	.506	12.5	27–13	14–27	7–9	81†
Philadelphia 76ers	34	48	.415	20	23–18	11–30	7–9	82
Toronto Raptors	34	48	.415	20	21–20	13–28	5–11	82

Eastern Conference
#	Team	W	L	PCT	GB	GP
1	z-Miami Heat *	66	16	.805	–	82
2	y-New York Knicks *	54	28	.659	12.0	82
3	y-Indiana Pacers *	49	32	.605	16.5	81
4	x-Brooklyn Nets	49	33	.598	17.0	82
5	x-Chicago Bulls	45	37	.549	21.0	82
6	x-Atlanta Hawks	44	38	.537	22.0	82
7	x-Boston Celtics	41	40	.506	24.5	81
8	x-Milwaukee Bucks	38	44	.463	28.0	82
9	Philadelphia 76ers	34	48	.415	32.0	82
10	Toronto Raptors	34	48	.415	32.0	82
11	Washington Wizards	29	53	.354	37.0	82
12	Detroit Pistons	29	53	.354	37.0	82
13	Cleveland Cavaliers	24	58	.293	42.0	82
14	Charlotte Bobcats	21	61	.256	45.0	82
15	Orlando Magic	20	62	.244	46.0	82

== Playoffs ==
=== Game log ===
2013 playoff game log
First Round: 2–4 (home: 1–2; road: 1–2)

Game	Date	Team	Score	High points	High rebounds	High assists	Location Attendance	Series
1	April 20	@ New York	L 78–85	Jeff Green (26)	Brandon Bass (10)	Paul Pierce (7)	Madison Square Garden; 19,033	0–1
2	April 23	@ New York	L 71–87	Paul Pierce (18)	Kevin Garnett (11)	Paul Pierce (6)	Madison Square Garden; 19,033	0–2
3	April 26	New York	L 76–90	Jeff Green (21)	Kevin Garnett (17)	Paul Pierce (5)	TD Garden; 18,624	0–3
4	April 28	New York	W 97–90 (OT)	Paul Pierce (29)	Kevin Garnett (17)	Garnett & Pierce (6)	TD Garden; 18,624	1–3
5	May 1	@ New York	W 92–86	Jeff Green (18)	Kevin Garnett (18)	Kevin Garnett (5)	Madison Square Garden; 19,033	2–3
6	May 3	New York	L 80–88	Jeff Green (21)	Kevin Garnett (10)	Paul Pierce (5)	TD Garden; 18,624	2–4

2013 playoff schedule

== Player statistics ==
Legend
GP	Games played	GS	Games started	MPG	Minutes per game
FG%	Field-goal percentage	3P%	3-point field-goal percentage	FT%	Free-throw percentage
RPG	Rebounds per game	APG	Assists per game	SPG	Steals per game
BPG	Blocks per game	PPG	Points per game

=== Regular season ===
Boston Celtics statistics
Player	GP	GS	MPG	FG%	3P%	FT%	RPG	APG	SPG	BPG	PPG
Brandon Bass	81	69	27.6	.486	.000	.860	5.2	1.0	.5	.8	8.7
Jeff Green	81	17	27.8	.467	.385	.808	3.9	1.6	.7	.8	12.8
Jason Terry	79	24	26.9	.434	.372	.870	2.0	2.5	.8	.1	10.1
Courtney Lee	78	39	24.9	.464	.372	.861	2.4	1.8	1.1	.3	7.8
Paul Pierce	77	77	33.4	.436	.380	.787	6.3	4.8	1.1	.4	18.6
Kevin Garnett	68	68	29.7	.496	.125	.786	7.8	2.3	1.1	.9	14.8
Chris Wilcox	61	7	13.6	.719	.000	.672	3.0	.4	.5	.5	4.2
Avery Bradley	50	50	28.7	.402	.317	.755	2.2	2.1	1.3	.4	9.2
Jared Sullinger	45	5	19.8	.493	.200	.746	5.9	.8	.5	.5	6.0
Leandro Barbosa	41	2	12.5	.430	.383	.756	1.1	1.4	.4	.1	5.2
Rajon Rondo	38	38	37.4	.484	.240	.645	5.6	11.1	1.8	.2	13.7
Jason Collins^{†}	32	7	10.3	.348		.700	1.6	.2	.3	.2	1.2
Jordan Crawford^{†}	27	2	21.6	.415	.320	.792	2.7	2.5	.4	.1	9.1
Terrence Williams	24	0	13.3	.495	.333	.429	1.8	1.6	.5	.1	4.6
Shavlik Randolph	16	0	12.4	.583		.407	4.4	.3	.5	.4	4.2
D. J. White	12	0	7.2	.522		.556	1.1	.3	.1	.5	2.4
Fab Melo	6	0	6.0	.500		.250	.5	.0	.3	.3	1.2
Kris Joseph^{†}	6	0	4.0	.182	.000	.750	.8	.2	.0	.0	1.2
Jarvis Varnado^{†}	5	0	3.6	.500		.500	.6	.2	.2	.0	1.2
Darko Miličić	1	0	5.0	.000			1.0	.0	.0	.0	.0

=== Playoffs ===
Boston Celtics statistics
Player	GP	GS	MPG	FG%	3P%	FT%	RPG	APG	SPG	BPG	PPG
Jeff Green	6	6	43.0	.435	.455	.844	5.3	2.3	.3	.7	20.3
Paul Pierce	6	6	42.5	.368	.268	.897	5.7	5.3	.8	.5	19.2
Kevin Garnett	6	6	35.3	.500	.000	.941	13.7	3.5	.8	1.0	12.7
Avery Bradley	6	6	31.8	.405	.250	1.000	2.2	1.3	1.8	.2	6.7
Brandon Bass	6	5	34.0	.483		.800	6.7	1.2	.3	.2	6.7
Jason Terry	6	1	31.5	.444	.441	.818	2.2	2.0	.7	.3	12.0
Jordan Crawford	5	0	11.8	.304	.250	.500	.6	.0	.4	.0	3.6
Terrence Williams	5	0	9.6	.200	.000	.500	2.0	1.2	.0	.2	1.0
Courtney Lee	4	0	9.8	.200	.000	1.000	.5	.3	.5	.0	1.5
Chris Wilcox	2	0	3.0				1.0	.0	.0	.0	.0
Shavlik Randolph	1	0	3.0				3.0	.0	.0	.0	.0

- ^{†} Denotes player spent time with another team in the season. Stats reflect time with the Celtics only.

== Transactions ==
=== Overview ===
Players Added

Via draft

- Kris Joseph
- Fab Melo
- Jared Sullinger

Via free agency

- Leandro Barbosa
- Brandon Bass
- Jason Collins
- Kevin Garnett
- Jeff Green
- Darko Miličić
- Jason Terry
- Chris Wilcox

Via trade

- Courtney Lee
Players Lost

Via trade

- JaJuan Johnson
- E'Twaun Moore
- Sasha Pavlović
- Sean Williams

Via free agency

- Ray Allen
- Marquis Daniels
- Ryan Hollins
- Mickaël Piétrus
- Greg Stiemsma

Retired/Waived

- Keyon Dooling

=== Trades ===
July 20, 2012	To Boston Celtics Courtney Lee (sign and trade)	To Houston Rockets JaJuan Johnson, E'Twaun Moore, Sean Williams, 2013 second-round draft pick, Draft rights to Jon Diebler (from Portland)	To Portland Trail Blazers Sasha Pavlović (sign and trade), Two 2013 second-round picks, Cash considerations

February 21, 2013	To Boston Celtics Jordan Crawford	To Washington Wizards Jason Collins, Leandro Barbosa

=== Free agents ===
Additions
Player	Date signed	Former team
Leandro Barbosa	October 18	Indiana Pacers
Brandon Bass	July 14	Resign
Jason Collins	July 31	Atlanta Hawks
Dionte Christmas	July 31	Rethymno Aegean B.C. (Greece)
Micah Downs	September 28	Bàsquet Manresa (Spain)
Kevin Garnett	July 14	Resign
Jeff Green	August 22	Resign
Rob Kurz	September 28	SLUC Nancy Basket (France)
Courtney Lee	July 20	Houston Rockets
Darko Miličić	September 28	Minnesota Timberwolves
Shavlik Randolph	March 1	Foshan Dralions (China)
Jamar Smith	July 31	BK Prostějov (Czech Republic)
Jason Terry	July 18	Dallas Mavericks
Chris Wilcox	July 14	Resign
D. J. White	February 28	Shanghai Sharks (China)
Terrence Williams	February 20	Guangdong Southern Tigers (China)

Subtractions
Player	Date signed	New team
Ray Allen	July 11	Miami Heat
Marquis Daniels	September 25	Milwaukee Bucks
Ryan Hollins	July 23	Los Angeles Clippers
Sasha Pavlović	July 20	Portland Trail Blazers
Mickaël Piétrus	November 30	Toronto Raptors
Greg Stiemsma	August 2	Minnesota Timberwolves
