= Danny Rumph =

American basketball player (1983–2005)

Personal information
- Born: 15 July 1983 Philadelphia, Pennsylvania, U.S.
- Died: 8 May 2005 (aged 21) Philadelphia, Pennsylvania, U.S.
- Listed height: 6 ft 2 in (1.88 m)
- Listed weight: 180 lb (82 kg)

Career information
- High school: Parkway Center City (Philadelphia, Pennsylvania)
- College: Western Kentucky (2002–2005)
- Position: Point guard

Danny Rumph (15 July 1983 – 8 May 2005) was an American basketball player. He played college basketball for Western Kentucky.

== High school ==
Rumph attended Parkway Center City Middle College where he played basketball for two seasons and averaged 22.1 points during his senior season in 2000–2001. The following year, he attended Maine Central Institute, a preparatory school, where he averaged 18 points and 7 assists per game.

== College ==
Rumph joined Western Kentucky University in 2002. During his junior season, he started 29 of 31 games, averaging 9.1 points and 3.0 assists per game for the Hilltoppers as they went 22–9 overall and 9–5 in the Sun Belt Conference.

== Death ==
On 8 May 2005, Rumph participated in two pickup matches in a local recreation center. While walking off the court after having just made the game winning basket, Rumph collapsed to the court and was later pronounced dead at the Albert Einstein Medical Center. An autopsy determined the cause of death was cardiomyopathy, an inflammation of the heart.

The Danny Rumph Classic basketball tournament is held annually in Philadelphia in his memory.
